= List of Type T2 tankers =

This is a list of names for the approximately 500 Type T2 tankers built for the United States Maritime Commission during World War II. Not included are the tankers of the Samoset/Chiwawa (T3-S-A1) type, which despite the "T3" designation were in fact nearly identical hulls to the original T2s, and smaller than the T2-A and T2-SE series.

The names listed here are believed to be the "as launched" names, as most ships were renamed later in their career. All are the T2-SE-A1 design unless otherwise noted.

== A ==
- Abiqua – Built in 1943 by Alabama Drydock and Shipbuilding Company, Mobile, Alabama for the United States War Shipping Administration. To Cities Service Oil Co., New York in 1946 the United States Department of Commerce, New York in 1955. To United States Navy in 1955 as USS Abiqua T-AO-158 in 1956 but returned to Department of Commerce the following year. To Windsor Navigation Co, New York in 1968. Rebuilt with the stern section joined to the bow section of Windsor to form 14,640 GRT bulk carrier Aqiba. Bow section joined to stern section of Windsor to form storage ship Bear Paw. To Mercury Steamship Co, New York in 1972 then Assos Navigation Co, Famagusta, Cyprus in 1973 and renamed Assos. To North Pacific Navigation Corporation, Panama in 1974 and renamed Ulrica. Scrapped in 1978 at Kaohsiung, Taiwan.
- Ackia – Built in 1945 by Alabama Drydock and Shipbuilding Company for the United States War Shipping Administration, Mobile. To Anglo-Saxon Petroleum, London in 1947 and renamed Tagelus. To Shell Petroleum Co in 1955 and Shell Tankers Ltd in 1960. Scrapped in 1961 at Rosyth, Fife, United Kingdom.

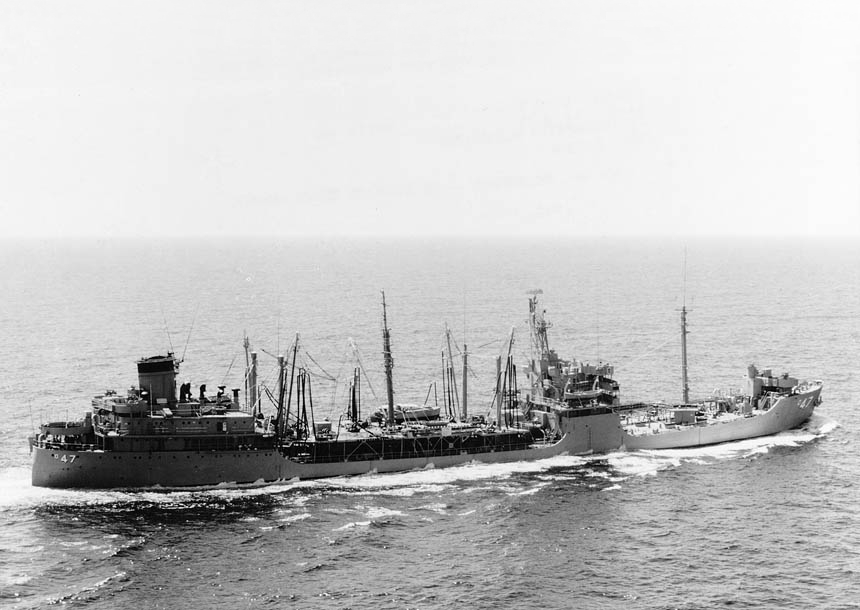
USS Neches

- Aekay (T2-A design) – Built in 1941 by Sun Shipbuilding & Drydock Co., Chester, Pennsylvania. To United States Navy as USS Neches (AO-47) and commissioned in 1942. In service until 1970.
- Allatoona – Built in 1945 by Sun Shipbuilding & Drydock Co. for the United States War Shipping Administration, Philadelphia, Pennsylvania. To North American Shipping & Trading Corporation, New York in 1947 and renamed Jeanny. To United States Department of Commerce in 1955. Severely damaged by engine room fire in 1957 but repaired and sold to Sheffield Tankers Corporation, Wilmington, Delaware and renamed Trojan. To Burco Shipping Corporation in 1962. Rebuilt and lengthened. Damaged on 10 October 1974 and consequently scrapped at Busan, South Korea.
- Amiens – Built in 1945 by Sun Shipbuilding & Drydock Co, Chester, Pennsylvania for the United States War Shipping Administration, Philadelphia. To Overseas Tankship Corporation, Panama in 1948 then Overseas Tankship (UK) Ltd, London in 1951 and renamed Caltex London. Scrapped in 1967 at Onomichi, Hiroshima, Japan.
- USS Anacostia – Built in 1944 by Marinship, Sausalito, California. Laid down as Mission Alamo but renamed before launch. To United States Navy, commissioned in 1945 as USS Anacostia (AO-94). To United States Naval Transport Service in 1948. To Military Sea Transportation Service in 1950 as USNS Anacostia (T-AO-94). Laid up in 1957. Sold in to Penn Shipping Co Inc, Wilmington, Delaware in 1967 and converted to a 14,177 GRT bulk carrier with the bow section from Nautilus being fitted; her own bow section was scrapped. She was renamed Penn Ranger. She was sold to Omnium Transportation Co, Panama. in 1973 and was renamed Omnium Ranger. She was scrapped at Castellón de la Plana, Spain in 1978.
- Antelope Hills – Built in 1944 by Marinship, Sausalito for the United States War Shipping Administration, San Francisco, California. To Trans-World Maritime Corporation, Wilmington, Delaware in 1948. To Lexington Transport Corporation, Monrovia, Liberia in 1956 and renamed Etude. Converted to liquid sulphur carrier in 1961. To Caribbean Sulphur Shipping Co, Monrovia in 1967. Scrapped in 1974 at Kaohsiung.
- Apache Canyon – Built in 1944 by Alabama Drydock and Shipbuilding Company for the United States War Shipping Administration, Mobile. To Panama Oceanic Lines Ltd, Panama in 1947. Renamed World Triumph in 1956. Reflagged to Greece in 1960, scrapped at La Spezia, Italy in 1965.
- Appomattox – Built in 1942 by Sun Shipbuilding & Drydock Co for the United States War Shipping Administration, Philadelphia. To Pan-American Transport & Petroleum Co, Wilmington in 1948 and renamed Pan Carolinas. To American Oil Company, Baltimore, Maryland in 1954. Renamed Amoco Carolinas in 1956. To Mathiasen's Tanker Industries, Wilmington in 1963 and renamed Appomattox. Sold in 1965 to Maritime Overseas Corporation and rebuilt. Stern section joined to bow section of Globe Explorer to form 13,810 GRT bulk carrier Globe Explorer for Sea Liberties Inc, New York. Bow section joined to stern section of Globe Explorer and sold for scrapping. Renamed Overseas Explorer in 1968. To Interseas Bulk Carriers Inc, New York in 1971 and renamed Overseas Bulker. To Norma Shipping Corporation, Panama in 1974 and renamed Norma M Byrne. Subsequently, scrapped at Vinaròs, Spain.
- Archers Hope – Built in 1945 by Alabama Drydock and Shipbuilding Company for the United States War Shipping Administration, Mobile. To Ships Inc, New York in 1947. To American Steamship Company, Buffalo, New York in 1956. Rebuilt and lengthened for Great Lakes service as bulk carrier Joseph S. Young. Further lengthened in 1966. Renamed H. Lee White in 1969 and Sharon in 1974. Out of service in 1986, Scrapped in 1990 at Brownsville, Texas.
- Arickaree – Built in 1943 by Alabama Drydock and Shipbuilding Company for the United States War Shipping Administration, Mobile. To United States Petroleum Carriers, New York in 1948. To Alexander S. Onassis Corporation, Monrovia in 1956 the Rosedale Navigation Co, Monrovia in 1962. Renamed Action in 1963. Scrapped at Kaohsiung in 1968.
- Ash Hollow – Built in 1943 by Alabama Drydock and Shipbuilding Company for the United States War Shipping Administration, Mobile. To Norwegian Government, Oslo in 1945 and renamed Kirkenes. To Skips A/S Hildefjord, Stavanger in 1947 and renamed Hildefjord. To Canterbury Investments Ltd, Nassau, Bahamas in 1959 and renamed Oswego Transporter. Scrapped in 1960 at Antwerp, Belgium.
- Atlantic Mariner – Built in 1945 by Sun Shipbuilding & Drydock Co for Atlantic Refining Co, Philadelphia. To Fox Shipping Co, New York in 1962 and renamed Walter Rice. Lengthened and converted to bulk carrier in 1963. To Reynolds Metals Co, New York in 1978. Scrapped in 1985 at Castellón de la Plana, Spain.
- Atlantic Ranger – Built in 1945 by Sun Shipbuilding & Drydock Co for Atlantic Refining Co, Philadelphia. To Tanker Transport Co, Monrovia in 1954. To Compagnia Naviera Angela S.A., Monrovia in 1963 and renamed Angela. To Seacrest Investment Co, Monrovia in 1964. Bow section scrapped, stern section joined to bow section of Waneta to form 17,563 GRT Santa Suzana. Rebuilt in 1967; bow section joined to stern section of Ponca City, that ship renamed Seafarer. Stern section joined to bow section of Ponca City to form 10,702 GRT Suzana S. To World Wide Transport Co, Monrovia later that year and renamed Conoco Humber. Scrapped at La Spezia, Italy in 1969.
- Atlantic Refiner – Built in 1945 by Sun Shipbuilding & Drydock Co for Atlantic Refining Co, Philadelphia. To Tanker Transport Co, Monrovia in 1954. To Sulphur Carriers Group, Monrovia in 1962. Converted to molten sulphur carrier and renamed Pochteca. Scrapped at Vinaròs. Spain in 1968.
- Atlantic Trader – Built in 1945 by Sun Shipbuilding & Drydock Co for Atlantic Refining Co, Philadelphia. Lengthened in 1958 then to Stonewall Steamship Co, Wilmington. To Atlantic Richfield Co, Philadelphia in 1968 then Cove Shipping Inc, New York in 1978. Renamed Cove Tide in 1979, scrapped later that year at Kaohsiung, Taiwan.
- Autossee – Built in 1944 by Alabama Drydock and Shipbuilding Company for the United States War Shipping Administration, Mobile. To the Italian Government in 1947, the Achille Lauro, Naples in 1948 and renamed Amalfi. Scrapped in 1968 at La Spezia.
- Averysboro – Built in 1945 by Sun Shipbuilding & Drydock Co for the United States War Shipping Administration, Philadelphia. To Norwegian Government in 1947 and renamed Finnmark. To Skibs A/S Ferm, Oslo in 1946. To AGIP Mineria S.p.A, Genoa, Italy in 1960 and renamed Sirip Jask. Used as a storage hulk at Khorramshahr, Iran. Scrapped in 1964 at Split, Yugoslavia.

== B ==
- Baldwin Hills – Built in 1944 by Marinship, Sausalito, California for the United States War Shipping Administration, San Francisco, California. To Petroleum Navigation Corporation, Wilmington, Delaware in 1948 and renamed Federal. To Trafalgar Steamship Corporation, Wilmington in 1950 and Alexander S. Onassis Corporation, Monrovia, Liberia in 1957. To Sunstone Marine Panama S.A., Monrovia in 1962, renamed Adventurer in 1963. Scrapped at Kaohsiung, Taiwan in 1969.
- Ball's Bluff – Built in 1943 by Sun Shipbuilding & Drydock Co., Chester, Pennsylvania for the United States War Shipping Administration, Philadelphia, Pennsylvania. To Ambronia Compagnia di Navigazione S.A., Genoa, Italy in 1948 and renamed Ambronia. To Corrado Società di Navigazione, Genoa in 1956 and renamed Rina Corrado. To Sicilarma Società di Navigazione per Azioni in 1963 but returned to Corrado later that year. Scrapped at Trieste in 1969.
- Bandelier – Built in 1944 by Kaiser Shipbuilding Company, Portland, Oregon for the United States War Shipping Administration, Portland. To Anglo-Saxon Petroleum, London, United Kingdom in 1947 and renamed Thelodimus. To N.V. Petroleum Maatschappij, The Hague, Netherlands in 1955 and Shell Tankers N.V., The Hague in 1960. Scrapped in 1961 at Faslane, Argyllshire, United Kingdom.
- Barren Hill – Built in 1944 by Alabama Drydock and Shipbuilding Company, Mobile, Alabama for the United States War Shipping Administration, Mobile. To Lanmore Co Inc, Panama in 1947 and the Panama Transoceanic Co. S.A., Panama in 1948. Rebuilt in 1960, now 14,417 GRT and renamed Phyllis T. Conway. Scrapped in 1975 at San Esteban de Pravia, Spain.
- Battle Mountain – Built in 1944 by Kaiser Shipbuilding Company, Portland for the United States War Shipping Administration, Portland. To National Bulk Carriers Inc. Wilmington

in 1946. To American Tankers Corporation, Wilmington in 1951 then National Bulk Carriers Inc, Wilmington in 1954. To Sabine Transportation Co, Baltimore, Maryland in 1958 and renamed Trinity. Rebuilt in 1959 and again in 1967. Scrapped in 1985 at Gadani Beach, Pakistan.

- Battle Rock – Built in 1944 by Kaiser Shipbuilding Company, Portland for the United States War Shipping Administration, Portland. To American Marine Corporation, New York in 1948 then United States Petroleum Corporation Inc., New York in 1949. To Alexander S. Onassis Corporation, Monrovia in 1957 then Rosedale Navigation Co, Monrovia in 1962. Renamed Armour in 1963. Scrapped in 1969 at Kaohsiung.
- Beacon Rock – Built in 1944 by Kaiser Shipbuilding Company, Portland for the United States War Shipping Administration, Portland. To the Soviet Union that year and renamed Donbass. Ran aground in the Pacific Ocean 360 nautical miles (670 km) south south east of Adagha Island, Alaska, United States and broke in two. Stern section salvaged and sold to Pacific Gas & Electric Co for use as a floating power plant at Eureka, California, United States.
- Bear Paw – Built in 1944 by Alabama Drydock and Shipbuilding Company, Mobile for the United States War Shipping Administration, Mobile. To Skips A/S Awilco, Oslo, Norway in 1947 and renamed Wilchief. Renamed Wilpower in 1960 and Wildura in 1963. Rebuilt that year as a 15,966 GRT bulk carrier. To Winco Tankers Ltd, Panama in 1968 and rebuilt. Stern section joined to bow section of Abiqua, the resulting ship was named Bear Paw and laid up at Mobile. In 1970 the stern section was scrapped and the bow section converted to a barge.
- Beaver Dam – Built in 1944 by Alabama Drydock and Shipbuilding Company, Mobile for the United States War Shipping Administration, Mobile. To Deep Sea Shipping and Chartering Co, Panama in 1947. Converted to bulk carrier in 1963, now 15,419 GRT. To Beaverdam Tankers, Panama in 1966, then Astrodevoto Compagnia di Navigazione S.A., Panama in 1968 and renamed Eastern Eagle. To Depot & Co-Ordination S.A., Panama in 1977 and renamed Psara Flag. Used as a storage hulk at Dammam, Saudi Arabia from 1981, scrapped in 1984.
- Beecher Island – Built in 1944 by Alabama Drydock and Shipbuilding Company, Mobile for the United States War Shipping Administration, Mobile. To British Tanker Company, London in 1947. Scrapped at Barrow-in-Furness, Cumberland in 1959.
- Belridge Hills – Built in 1945 by Marinship, Saulito, California for United States War Shipping Administration, San Francisco. To A/S Mosvold Shipping Co, Farsund, Norway in 1948 and renamed Mosbay. To Compagnia Naviera Acapulco S.A., Monrovia in 1952 and renamed Fury. To Golfo Surena Compagnia Navigazione S.A., Monrovia in 1953 and renamed Sunbeam. Rebuilt in 1963 as 12,723 GRT bulk carrier. To Parnassos Shipping Corporation, Monrovia in 1964 and renamed Soull. To Pacofoc Coast Shipping Corporation, Monrovia in 1970 and renamed Pacrover. Foundered on 24 December 1972 800 nautical miles (1,500 km) south of Kodiak, Alaska.
- Bemis Heights – Built in 1944 by Alabama Drydock and Shipbuilding Company, Mobile for the United States War Shipping Administration, Mobile. To Standard Oil Co of New Jersey in 1947 and renamed Esso Wheeling. Wrecked on 5 November 1948 at Quoin Point, South Africa.
- Bennington – Built in 1942 by Sun Shipbuilding & Drydock Co., Chester, Pennsylvania for the United States War Shipping Administration, Philadelphia. To Keystone Tankship Corporation, Wilmington in 1945l To Chas. Kurz & Co, Wilmington in 1968. Scrapped at Kaohsiung in 1972.
- Bent's Fort – Built in 1944 by Kaiser Shipbuilding Company, Portland for the United States War Shipping Administration, Portland. To Cities Service Oil Co, New York in 1948. To Hudson Waterways Corporation, New York in 1963 and renamed Transhudson. Scrapped at Castellón de la Plana, Spain in 1970.
- Big Bend – Built in 1944 by Kaiser Shipbuilding Company, Portland for the United States War Shipping Administration, Portland. To Union Oil Company of California, Los Angeles in 1946 and renamed Oleum. To Potrero Corporation, New York in 1955 and renamed Big Bend. To American Tramp Shipping Corporation, New York in 1956 then Red Canyon Corporation, Monrovia in 1957 and renamed Triton. To Kulukundis Maritime Industries Inc., New York in 1962. Rebuilt as a 14,461 GRT bulk carrier and renamed Southampton. To Ambrose Transport Inc, New York in 1963 and renamed Columbia. To Sea Transport Inc, New York in 1965. Scrapped at Hong Kong in 1981.
- Birch Coulie – Built in 1943 by Alabama Drydock and Shipbuilding Company, Mobile for the United States War Shipping Administration, Mobile. To Independent Tankships Inc, Wilmington in 1948. To Keystone Shipping Inc, Philadelphia in 1955 then Panexito Compagnia Navigazione S.A., Monrovia in 1957 and renamed Memory. Scrapped at Trieste, Italy in 1960.
- Black Hills – Built in 1944 by Kaiser Shipbuilding Company, Portland for the United States War Shipping Administration, Portland. To Standard Vacuum Oil Company, Wilmington in 1948 and renamed Stanvac Hong Kong. Reflagged to Panama in 1955. Scrapped at Hirao, Japan in 1962.
- Black Jack – Built in 1942 by Sun Shipbuilding & Drydock Co., Chester, Pennsylvania for the United States War Shipping Administration, Philadelphia. To Tidewater Oil Company. Wilmington in 1947 and renamed William F. Humphrey. To Getty Oil Company, Wilmington in 1967. Rebuilt to 13,569 GRT in 1968 and renamed Wilmington Getty. To Getty Refining & Marketing Co, Wilmington in 1977. Scrapped at Kaohsiung in 1983.
- Black River – Built in 1943 by Alabama Drydock and Shipbuilding Company, Mobile for the United States War Shipping Administration, Mobile. To Continental Oil Company, Wilmington in 1947 and renamed Ponca City. To Marine Corporation, Wilmington in 1948 and renamed Marine Leader. To Waterman Steamship Corporation, Mobile in 1956 and renamed Maxton. To Transocean Petroleum Carriers, Wilmington in 1960 then Empire Transport Inc, New York in 1962 and renamed Potomac. Rebuilt that year as a 13,858 GRT bulk carrier. Scrapped at Gadani Beach in 1982.
- Blackstocks Ford – Built in 1942 by Sun Shipbuilding & Drydock Co., Chester, Pennsylvania for the United States War Shipping Administration, Philadelphia. To Standard Oil Company of New Jersey in 1946 and renamed Esso Knoxville. To Panama Transport Company, Panama in 1947. To Petrolera Transoceanica S.A., Callao, Peru in 1959 and renamed Transoceana. Scrapped at Kaohsiung in 1972.
- Blackwater – Built in 1942 by Sun Shipbuilding & Drydock Co., Chester, Pennsylvania for the United States War Shipping Administration, Philadelphia. To Imperial Oil Shipping Co, Montreal, Quebec, Canada in 1947 and renamed Imperial Toronto. To Standard Tankers (Bahamas) Ltd, London in 1958 and renamed Esso Nassau. To Coastwise Tankoil Ltd, London in 1960 and renamed Nassau Cay, then to Minerva Maritime Corporation, Monrovia in 1961 and renamed Dimitrios. Rebuilt in 1963 as a 13,486 GRT bulk carrier. To Obo Tanker Corporation, Panama in 1975 and renamed Nicholas C. Sprang a leak 200 nautical miles (370 km) off Beira, Mozambique and was abandoned on 21 June 1975, presumed subsequently foundered.
- Bladensburg – Built in 1943 by Kaiser Shipbuilding Company, Portland for the United States War Shipping Administration, Portland. To Standard Oil Company of New Jersey in 1947 and renamed Esso Allentown. To Esso Shipping Company, Wilmington in 1950 and Humble Oil & Refining Company in 1960. To Allentown Carriers inc, New York in 1963 and renamed Allentown Carrier then to Bladensburg Corporation Inc, New York later that year and renamed Bladensburg. To Hudson Waterways Inc, New York in 1967 and renamed Transsuperior. Rebuilt that year, now 11,957 GRT. To Polk Tanker Corporation, New York in 1972 then United States Department of Commerce – Maritime Administration in 1979. Scrapped at Brownsville, Texas in 1981.
- Bloody Marsh – Built in 1942 by Sun Shipbuilding & Drydock Co., Chester, Pennsylvania for the United States War Shipping Administration, Philadelphia. Torpedoed, shelled and sunk in the Atlantic Ocean (31°33′N 78°57′W) by U-66 on 2 July 1943 whilst on her maiden voyage with the loss of three of her 77 crew.
- Blue Licks – Built in 1943 by Alabama Drydock and Shipbuilding Company, Mobile for the United States War Shipping Administration, Mobile. To Overseas Tankship Corporation, Panama in 1947. To N.V. Nederlandsche Pacific Tankvaart Maatschappij, The Hague in 1950 and renamed Caltex Utrecht. To Lisnave Shipyard, Lisbon, Portugal in 1966 and renamed Praia Branca Used as a hulk. Deleted from Lloyd's Register in 1967.
- Boonesborough – Built in 1943 by Alabama Drydock and Shipbuilding Company, Mobile for the United States War Shipping Administration, Mobile. To Overseas Tankship Corporation, Panama in 1947. To N.V. Nederlandsche Pacific Tankvaart Maatschappij, The Hague in 1950 and renamed Caltex The Hague. Rebuilt in 1967 to 13,894 GRT then to Chevron Tankers (Nederland) N.V., The Hague and renamed Chevron The Hague. Scrapped at Santander, Spain in 1983.
- Boundbrook – Built in 1942 by Sun Shipbuilding & Drydock Co., Chester, Pennsylvania for the United States War Shipping Administration, Philadelphia. To Imperial Oil Shipping Company, Montreal in 1947 and renamed Imperial Edmonton. To Upper Lakes Shipping Ltd, Montreal and renamed Hull 28. Bow section scrapped in 1960 at Port Weller, Ontario. Stern section used in building of Red Wing. In service until 1984, scrapped at Kaohsiung in 1987.
- Bradford Island – Built in 1943 by Kaiser Shipbuilding Company, Portland for the United States War Shipping Administration, Portland. To Cities Service Oil Company, New York in 1948. Rebuilt in 1970, now 18,681 GRT. To International Ocean Transport Corporation, New York in 1975 then Grand Bassa Tankers Inc, New York in 1979. To Sabine Transportation & Towing Company, Baltimore later that year and renamed Concho. To Hvide Marine Inc. Port Everglades, Florida in 1998 and renamed HMI Trader. Renamed Rader in 2000, scrapped at Alang, India.
- Brandy Station – Built in 1942 by Sun Shipbuilding & Drydock Co., Chester, Pennsylvania for the United States War Shipping Administration, Philadelphia. To Pan American Petroleum and Transport Company, Wilmington in 1946 and renamed Pan-New York. To American Oil Company, Baltimore in 1954. Renamed Amoco New York in 1956. To Amoco Shipping Company, Baltimore in 1970. Scrapped at Brownsville, Texas in 1978.
- Briar Creek – Built in 1943 by Alabama Drydock and Shipbuilding Company, Mobile for the United States War Shipping Administration, Mobile. To The Texas Company, Wilmington in 1947, renamed North Carolina in 1948 and Texaco North Carolina in 1960. To Enterprise Shipping Corporation, Panama in 1977 and renamed Oswego Tarmac. Struck by Elektra at Curaçao, Netherlands Antilles on 11 March 1978 and severely damaged. Consequently, scrapped at Santander, Spain.
- Brookfield – Built in 1943 by Kaiser Shipbuilding Company, Portland for the United States War Shipping Administration, Portland. To Union Sulphur Co Inc, New York in 1948 and rename William M. Burden. To Pacific Tankers Inc, New York in 1950 then Western Tankers Inc, New York in 1951. To Alexander S. Onassis Corporation, Monrovia in 1957. To Commercial Tankers Inc, Buenos Aires, Argentina in 1960 and renamed Petronorte. Scrapped at Castellón de la Plana in 1966.
- Bryce Canyon – Built in 1944 by Kaiser Shipbuilding Company, Portland for the United States War Shipping Administration, Portland. To Anglo Saxon Petroleum Co, London in 1947 and renamed Turbinellus. To Eagle Oil & Shipping Co, London in 1948, renamed San Leonard in 1949. Scrapped at Dalmuir, Dunbartonshire, United Kingdom.
- Buena Vista – Built in 1944 by Sun Shipbuilding & Drydock Co., Chester, Pennsylvania for The Texas Company. Renamed Wyoming in 1950 and Texaco Wyoming in 1960. Rebuilt in 1961, now 14,242 GRT. To Sea Lady Shipping Co, Wilmington in 1972 and renamed Sea Lady. To Navegacion Goya S.A., Panama in 1973. Scrapped at Hualien City, Taiwan in 1974.
- Buena Vista Hills – Built in 1944 by Marinship, Sausalito, California for the United States War Shipping Administration, San Francisco. To American Trading & Production Corporation, Baltimore in 1948 and renamed Texas Trader. Scrapped at Hong Kong in 1962.
- Buffalo Wallow – Built in 1943 by Alabama Drydock and Shipbuilding Company, Mobile for the United States War Shipping Administration, Mobile. To Stanolind Marine Transport Co, Wilmington in 1948 and renamed F. O. Prior. To Pan-American Petroleum & Transport Co, Wilmington in 1950, renamed Pan-Connecticut in 1951. To American Oil Co, Baltimore in 1954, renamed Amoco Connecticut in 1955. To First Tanker Co, Wilmington in 1957. Rebuilt that year, now 12,491 GRT. To American Oil Co, Baltimore in 1960 and Amoco Shipping Co, New York in 1970. Scrapped at Brownsville, Texas in 1982.
- Bull Run – Built in 1943 by Sun Shipbuilding & Drydock Co., Chester, Pennsylvania for the United States War Shipping Administration, Philadelphia. To Petrol Tanker Industries Inc, Wilmington in 1947. To United States Department of Commerce – Marine Administration in 1955. To United States Navy in 1956 as USNS Bull Run (T-AO-156). Rebuilt in 1969, stern section joined to bow section of Type C4 ship Anchorage to form 11,476 GRT ship Anchorage. To Litton Industries Leasing Corporation, Wilmington in 1973 then Reynolds Leasing Corporation, Wilmington in 1975. Scrapped at Brownsville, Texas in 1980.
- Bunker Hill – Built in 1942 by Sun Shipbuilding & Drydock Co., Chester, Pennsylvania for the United States War Shipping Administration, Philadelphia. To Keystone Tankshire Corporation, Wilmington in 1945. Exploded and broke in two off Anacortes, Washington on 6 March 1964.
- Bushy Run – Built in 1944 by Sun Shipbuilding & Drydock Co., Chester, Pennsylvania for the United States War Shipping Administration, Philadelphia. To Gulf Oil Corporation, Philadelphia in 1946, renamed Gulfray in 1946. To Blackships Inc, Wilmington in 1958 and renamed Gulflion. Rebuilt and now 12,651 GRT. To Steamship Mona Co. Inc, Los Angeles in 1981 and renamed Mona. To Eastern Overseas Inc in 1983, scrapped at Kaohsiung in 1984.

== C ==
- Cabusto – Built in 1945 by Alabama Drydock and Shipbuilding Company, Mobile, Alabama for the United States War Shipping Administration, Mobile. To Overseas Tankship Corporation, Panama in 1947. Renamed Caltex Venice in 1952. Rebuilt in 1965, now 13,991 GRT. Renamed Chevron Venice in 1968. Scrapped at Kaohsiung, Taiwan in 1977.

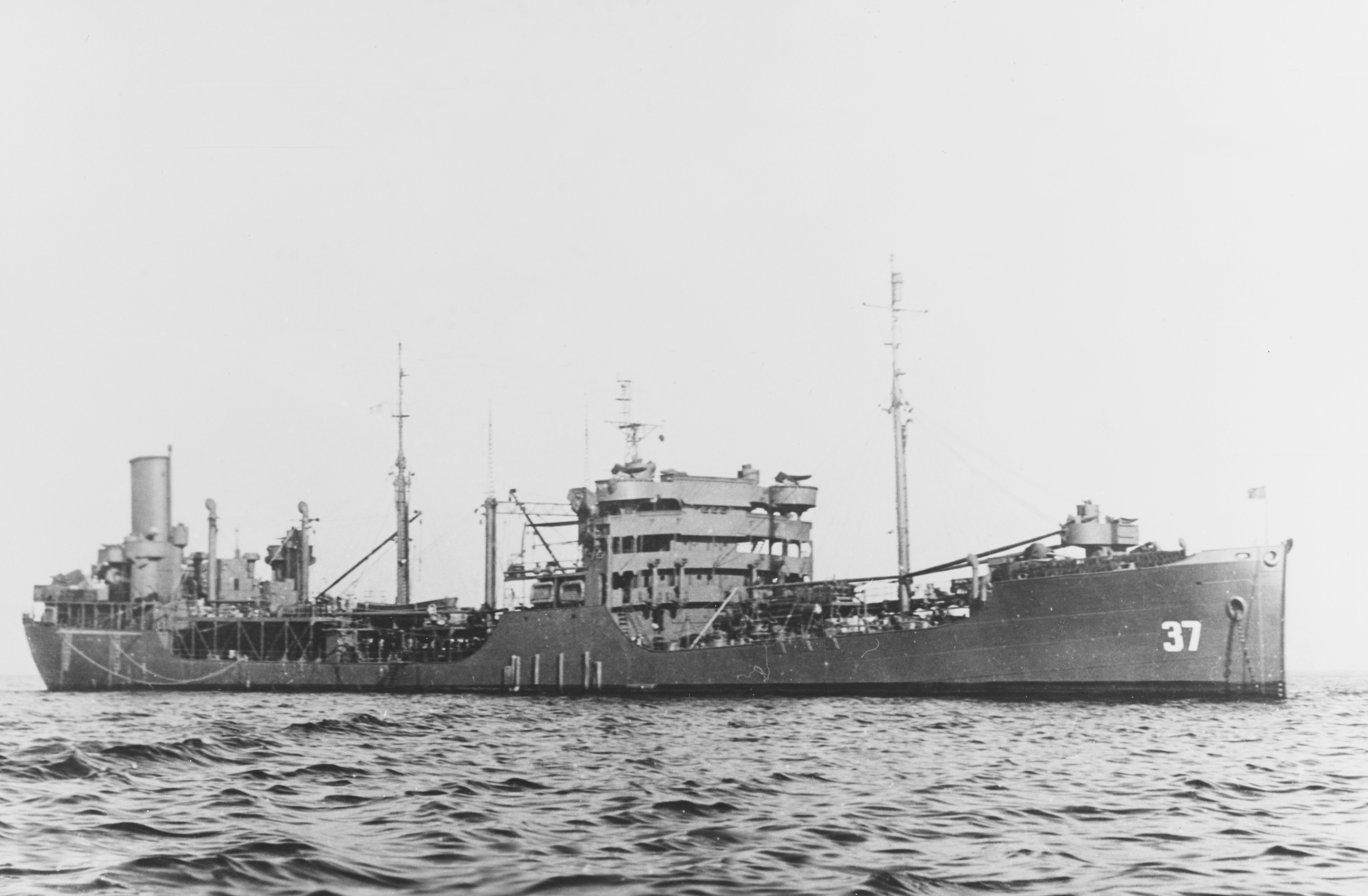
USS Merrimack.

- Caddo (T2 design) – Built in 1941 by Bethlehem Sparrows Point Shipyard, Bethlehem, Maryland for Socony-Vacuum Oil Company, New York. To United States Navy later that year, commissioned as USS Merrimack (AO-37) in 1942. To United States Maritime Administration in 1959 and laid up at Beaumont, Texas. Scrapped at Beaumont in 1982.
- Caddo – Built in 1942 by Sun Shipbuilding & Drydock Co., Chester, Pennsylvania for Socony-Vacuum Oil Company, New York. Torpedoed and sunk in the Atlantic Ocean (42°25′N 48°27′W) by U-518 with the loss of 51 of her 59 crew.
- Cahawba – Built in 1945 by Alabama Drydock and Shipbuilding Company, Mobile for the United States War Shipping Administration, Mobile. To Anglo-Saxon Petroleum, London, United Kingdom in 1947 and renamed Tectarius. To Shell Petroleum Co, London in 1955 and Shell Tankers Ltd, London in 1960. Scrapped at Faslane, Dunbartonshire in 1961.
- Callabee – Built in 1945 by Alabama Drydock and Shipbuilding Company, Mobile for the United States War Shipping Administration, Mobile. To National Bulk Carriers Inc, Wilmington, Delaware in 1948. Scrapped at Vado Ligure, Italy in 1961.
- Camas Meadows – Built in 1943 by Alabama Drydock and Shipbuilding Company, Mobile for the United States War Shipping Administration, Mobile. To United States Petroleum Carriers Inc, New York in 1948. Capsized and sank in a gale at Genoa, Italy on 19 February 1955.
- Camp Charlotte – Built in 1942 by Sun Shipbuilding & Drydock Co., Chester, Pennsylvania for the United States War Shipping Administration, Philadelphia, Pennsylvania. To Tidewater Associated Oil Company, Wilmington in 1947 and renamed Robert E. Hopkins. To Neptune Sulphur Carriers Inc, Wilmington in 1964 and renamed Louisianan. To Mutual Life Insurance Co of New York in 1965 and renamed Louisiana Brimstone. Rebuilt as molten sulphur carrier, now 13,118 GRT. To First National Bank of Commerce, New Orleans, Louisiana in 1990. Ran aground at Coatzacoalcos, Mexico on 20 February 1991. Refloated but laid up at Tampa, Florida. Scrapped at Alang, India in 1993.
- Camp Defiance – Built in 1944 by Alabama Drydock and Shipbuilding Company, Mobile for the United States War Shipping Administration, Mobile. To the French Government in 1947 and renamed Lavera. Renamed Ventose in 1952. To Compagnie Nationale de Navigation, Rouen in 1955. To Heathcote Shipping Ltd, Nassau, Bahamas in 1961 and renamed Transasia. To Compagnia Naviera Continental S.A., Monrovia, Liberia in 1962. To Gotaas-Larsen Ltd, Monrovia in 1964 and renamed Don Segundo Sombra. To Naviera Panamericana S.A., Buenos Aires, Argentina in 1965; converted to 10,843 GRT bulk carrier. To Gotaas-Larsem S.r.L, Buenos Aires in 1966 then Alianza Naviera Argentina S.A., Buenos Aires in 1980. Wrecked at Punta Calenderia, Argentina on 22 January 1980 whilst under tow to Bilbao, Spain for scrapping.
- Camp Namanu – Built in 1944 by Kaiser Shipyards, Portland, Oregon for the United States War Shipping Administration, Portland. To American Marine Corporation, New York in 1948 then United States Petroleum Carriers, New York in 1949. To Alexander S. Onassis Corporation, Monrovia in 1957 then Rosedale Navigation Co, Monrovia in 1962. Renamed Ark in 1963. Scrapped at Valencia, Spain in 1969.
- Cannon Beach – Built in 1945 by Kaiser Shipyards, Portland for the United States War Shipping Administration, Portland. To Lanmore Co. Inc, Panama in 1947 them Panama Transoceanic Co, Panama in 1948. Renamed Carolyn E. Conway in 1960, rebuilt, now 14,450 GRT. Scrapped at Vitória, Brazil in 1975.
- Cantigny – Built in 1945 by Sun Shipbuilding & Drydock Co., Chester, Pennsylvania for the United States War Shipping Administration, Philadelphia. To Cities Service Oil Company, New York in 1947. To Tankships Inc, New York in 1962; rebuilt, now 15,344 GRT. To International Ocean Transportation Corporation, New York in 1976 then Grand Bassa Tankers Inc, New York in 1979. To Sabine Towing & Transport Company, Baltimore, Maryland in 1980 and renamed Frio. Scrapped at La Linea, Spain in 1984.
- Canyon Creek – Built in 1944 by Alabama Drydock and Shipbuilding Company, Mobile for the United States War Shipping Administration, Mobile. To Standard Oil Company of New Jersey in 1947 and renamed Esso Burlington. To Esso Shipping Co, Wilmington in 1950 then Panama Transport Co, Panama in 1956. To Trinity Marine Corporation, Monrovia in 1960 and renamed Trinity Mariner. Scrapped at Osaka, Japan in 1964.
- Capitol Reef – Built in 1945 by Kaiser Shipyards, Portland for the United States War Shipping Administration, Portland. To Anglo Saxon Petroleum Co, London in 1947 and renamed Tomocyclus. To N.V. Petroleum Maatschappij, The Hague in 1950 then Shell Tankers NV, The Hague in 1960. Scrapped at Dalmuir, Fife, United Kingdom in 1961.

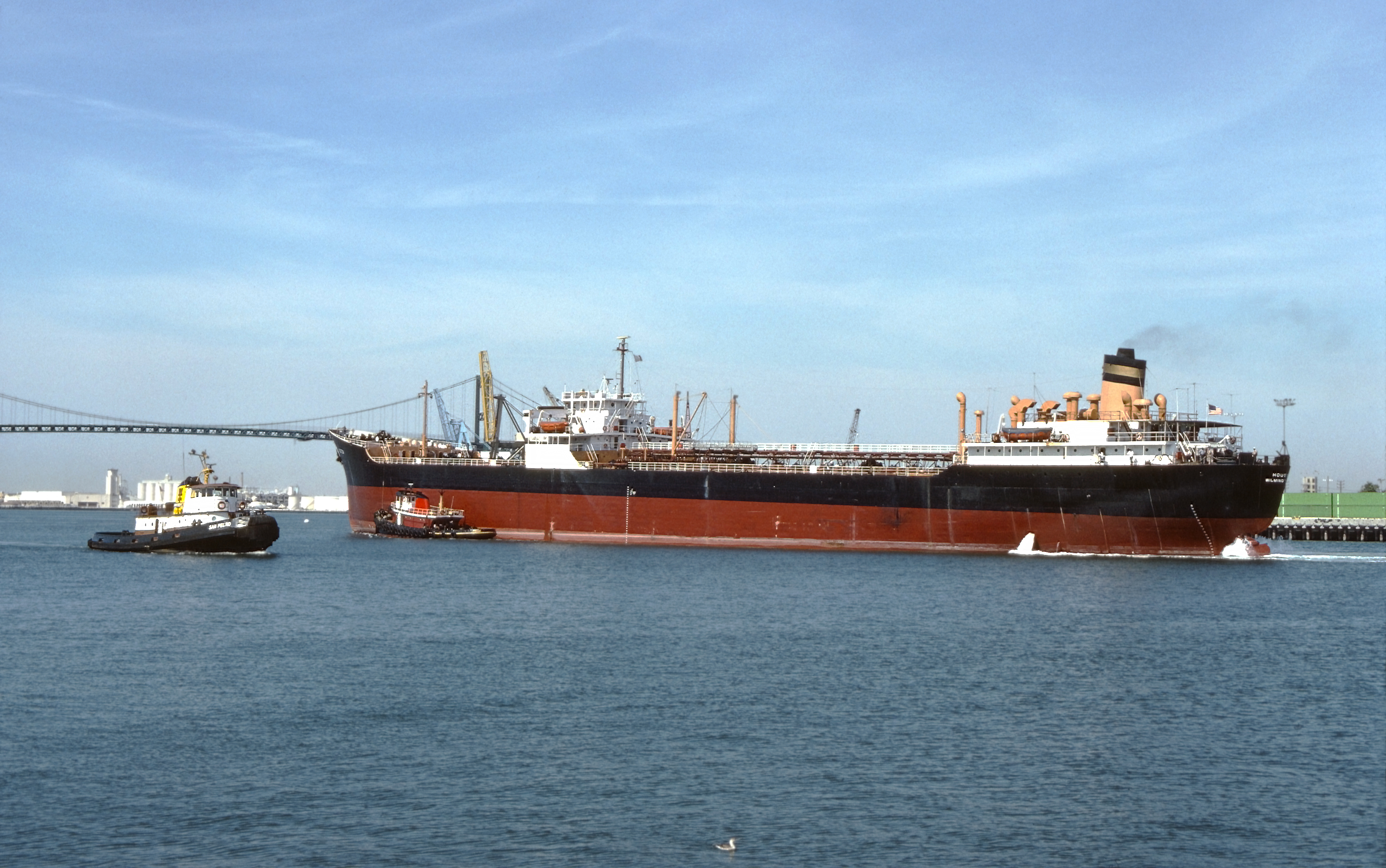
Houston arriving in Los Angeles in 1978

- Caribbean – Built in 1942 by Sun Shipbuilding & Drydock Co., Chester, Pennsylvania for the United States War Shipping Administration, Philadelphia. To Trinidad Corporation, Wilmington in 1946. Rebuilt in 1962, now 14,761 GRT, renamed Houston (IMO 5155654). Scrapped at Santander, Spain in 1984.
- Carlsbad – Built in 1945 by Kaiser Shipyards, Portland for the United States War Shipping Administration, Portland. To Overseas Tankship Corporation, Panama in 1947. Renamed Caltex Johannesburg in 1952. To Overseas Tankship (UK) Ltd, London in 1959 then to Nihon Seikyu K.K., Tokyo, Japan in 1961, renamed Nisseki Maru. Rebuilt as a liquid petroleum gas tanker in 1962, now 16,640 GRT. To Avanti Steamship Co, Monrovia in 1969, renamed Beava. Scrapped at Kaohsiung in 1974.
- Carnifax Ferry – Built in 1945 by Sun Shipbuilding & Drydock Co., Chester, Pennsylvania for the United States War Shipping Administration, Philadelphia. To American Trading & Construction Corporation, Baltimore in 1948, renamed Crown Trader. Rebuilt in 1958, now 12,678 GRT, renamed Maryland Trader. To American Trading Transportation Company, New York in 1972. Scrapped at Burriana, Spain in 1976.
- Casa Grande – Built in 1944 by Kaiser Shipyards, Portland for the United States War Shipping Administration, Portland. To Overseas Tankship Corporation, Panama in 1948. Renamed Caltex Copenhagen in 1952. Scrapped at Hirao, Japan in 1966.
- Castle Pinckney – Built in 1944 by Kaiser Shipyards, Portland for the United States War Shipping Administration, Portland. To Standard Oil Company of New Jersey in 1947, renamed Esso Everett. To Esso Shipping Company, Wilmington in 1950. To Republic Tankers Inc, Monrovia in 1955, renamed Great Neck. To Texaco(Panama) Inc, Monrovia in 1960, renamed Texaco Southampton. To Artemission Steamship Co, Monrovia in 1962, renamed Anne Louise. Scrapped at Hirao in 1965.
- Castle's Woods – Built in 1945 by Sun Shipbuilding & Drydock Co., Chester, Pennsylvania for the United States War Shipping Administration, Philadelphia. To Overseas Tankship Corporation, Panama in 1947. To Overseas Tankship (UK) Ltd, London in 1951, renamed Caltex Bombay. To Texaco Overseas Tankship Ltd, London in 1968, rebuilt and now 13,892 GRT. Renamed Texaco Bombay. Scrapped at Kaohsiung in 1982.

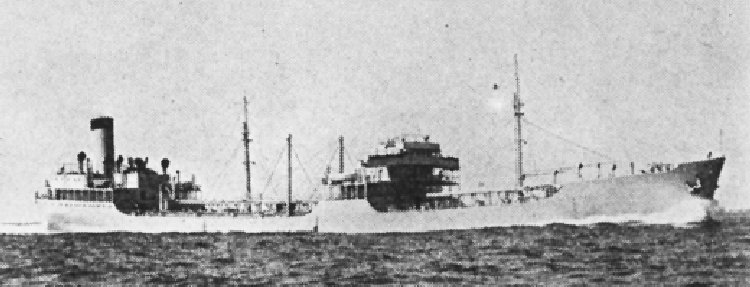
USS Neosho.

- Catawba (T2 design) – Built in 1941 by Bethlehem Sparrows Point Shipyard, Bethlehem, Maryland for Socony-Vacuum Oil Company, New York. Renamed Neosho in 1942, then to United States Navy as USS Neosho (AO-48). To United States Maritime Commission in 1947 then Socony-Vacuum Oil Company in 1948 and renamed Tascalusa. Renamed Ascalusa in 1963. Scrapped in 1964.
- Catawba Ford – Built in 1944 by Sun Shipbuilding & Drydock Co., Chester, Pennsylvania for the United States War Shipping Administration, Philadelphia. To Keystone Tankship Corporation, Wilmington in 1947. Scrapped at Kaohsiung in 1975.
- Catham – Built in 1944 by Sun Shipbuilding & Drydock Co., Chester, Pennsylvania for the United States War Shipping Administration, Philadelphia. To Bernutm, Lembke Co, Wilmington in 1948, renamed Tydol Bayonne. Renamed Catham in 1954. To Hudson Waterways Corporation, New York in 1962, renamed Transerie. Lengthened with midships section from USS Pawcatuck in 1967, now 11,971 GRT. To Polk Tanker Corporation, New York in 1972 then United States Department of Commerce, New York in 1979. To Violet Dock Port Company, Louisiana in 1981 for use as a hulk. Scrapped by 2004.
- Cayuse – Built in 1944 by Alabama Drydock and Shipbuilding Company, Mobile for the United States War Shipping Administration, Mobile. To Cape Horn Steamship Company, New York in 1948, renamed Ivy. To Ivy steamship Company, New York in 1954 the Jupiter Steamship Corporation, New York in 1956. To Sietes Mares Societa Marina, Monrovia in 1957, renamed Andros Lark. To Transpollux Carriers Corporation, Monrovia in 1959, renamed Valiant Torch. To Compagnia de Navigacion Costera Argentina, Buenos Aires in 1961. To La Naviera Linea Argentina de Navigacion Maritima y Fluvial, Buenos Aires and renamed Mar Caspio. Collided with barges in the Parana River on 24 February 1982. Scrapped in 1983.
- Cedar Breaks – Built in 1944 by Kaiser Shipyards, Portland for the United States War Shipping Administration, Portland. To Overseas Tankship Corporation, Panama in 1947. Renamed Caltex Genoa in 1952. Rebuilt in 1966, now 13,938 GRT. Renamed Chevron Genoa in 1968. To American Transport Company & Overseas Tankship Corporation, Panama in 1970. Scrapped at Hong Kong in 1979.

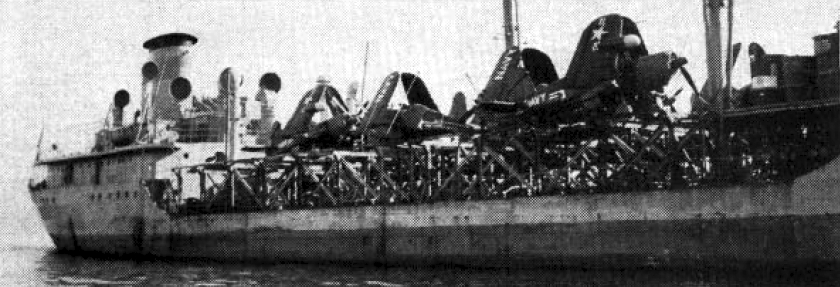
USS Cedar Creek.

- Cedar Creek – Built in 1943 by Sun Shipbuilding & Drydock Co., Chester, Pennsylvania for the United States War Shipping Administration, Philadelphia. To the Soviet Union in 1944 and renamed Taganro. To United States Maritime Commission in 1948, renamed Cedar Creek then to United States Navy as USS Cedar Creek (AO-138). To United States Department of Commerce in 1957. Scrapped at Portland in 1975.
- Cedar Mills – Built in 1944 by Alabama Drydock and Shipbuilding Company, Mobile for the United States War Shipping Administration, Mobile. Struck a mine and sank off Ancona, Italy on 19 November 1945.
- Cedar Mountain – Built in 1944 by Sun Shipbuilding & Drydock Co., Chester, Pennsylvania for the United States War Shipping Administration, Philadelphia. To Sun Oil Company, Philadelphia in 1947, renamed Maryland Sun. To Cohansey Steamship Company, Philadelphia in 1966, renamed Cohansey. To Zip Corporation, Panama in 1970. Collided with Marimunda off Pladju, Indonesia on 20 April 1971. Arrested and laid up in Singapore. Scrapped at Kaohsiung in 1973.
- Celilo – Built in 1944 by Kaiser Shipyards, Portland for the United States War Shipping Administration, Portland. To Panama Oceanic Lines Inc, Panama in 1947. Renamed World Trade in 1956. To Compagnia de Navigacion Caros, Monrovia in 1960, renamed World Citizen. To Atlantic Navigation Corporation, Monrovia in 1969, renamed Eleanor. Scrapped at Incheon, South Korea in 1977.
- Cerro Gordo – Built in 1944 by Sun Shipbuilding & Drydock Co., Chester, Pennsylvania for The Texas Company. Renamed Virginia in 1951 and Texaco Virginia in 1960. To Hudson Waterways Corporation, New York in 1962, renamed Transorleans. Scrapped at Valencia in 1970.
- Chaco Canyon – Built in 1944 by Kaiser Shipyards, Portland for the United States War Shipping Administration, Portland. To Anglo Saxon Petroleum Co, London in 1947, renamed Thallepus. To Shell Petroleum Co, London in 1955 and Shell Tankers Ltd, London in 1960. Scrapped at Port Glasgow, Renfrewshire, United Kingdom in 1960.
- Chadd's Ford – Built in 1944 by Sun Shipbuilding & Drydock Co., Chester, Pennsylvania for the United States War Shipping Administration, Philadelphia. To Standard Oil Company of New Jersey in 1947, renamed Esso Greenville. To Esso Shipping Company, Wilmington in 1950 then Humble Oil & Refining Company, Wilmington in 1960. To Matiesen Tanker Industries, Wilmington in 1963, renamed Chadd's Ford. To United States Steel Corporation, New York in 1964. Renamed Columbia and converted to 6,848 GRT bulk carrier. To American Pacific Container Line in 1977, renamed Pacific Envoy in 1978. Scrapped at Kaohsiung in 1979.
- Chalmette – Built in 1944 by Kaiser Shipyards, Portland for the United States War Shipping Administration, Portland. To Standard Vacuum Oil Company, Wilmington in 1947, renamed Stanvac Brisbane. To Esso Shipping Company, Wilmington in 1951, renamed Esso Lynchburg. To United States Department of Commerce, Wilmington in 1956, renamed Lynchburg. To Marine Sulphur Shipping Corporation, Wilmington in 1970. Rebuilt as a 11,080 GRT molten sulphur carrier, renamed Marine Duval. Scrapped at Alang in 2002.
- Champion's Hill – Built in 1944 by Sun Shipbuilding & Drydock Co., Chester, Pennsylvania for the United States War Shipping Administration, Philadelphia. To Anglo-American Oil Company, London in 1946, renamed Esso London. To Esso Petroleum Co, London in 1955. Scrapped at Split, Yugoslavia in 1958.
- Champoeg – Built in 1943 by Kaiser Shipyards, Portland for the United States War Shipping Administration, Portland. To Panama Oceanic Lines, Panama in 1947. Renamed World Tide in 1956. To Memphis Shipping Corporation, Monrovia in 1959. Rebuilt as a 14,313 GRT bulk carrier in 1963, renamed World Champion. To Ceres Shipping Co, Monrovia in 1964 then Fair Mount Shipping Corporation, Monrovia in 1965 and renamed Western Eagle. Scrapped at Gandia, Spain in 1977.
- Chancellorsville – Built in 1944 by Sun Shipbuilding & Drydock Co., Chester, Pennsylvania for Paco Tankers Inc, Wilmington. Rebuilt in 1961, now 14,445 GRT. To Keystone Shipping Company, Philadelphia in 1964. To United States Department of Transportation in 1982, laid up at Norfolk, Virginia. Scrapped at Tuxpan, Mexico in 1992.
- Chantilly – Built in 1944 by Sun Shipbuilding & Drydock Co., Chester, Pennsylvania for the United States War Shipping Administration, Philadelphia. To Panama Oceanic Lines, Panama in 1947. To Statel Compagnia se Vapores, Panama in 1956, renamed World Trophy. To Compagnia de Navigacion Bolcar, Monrovia in 1960. Rebuilt as 12,805 GRT bulk carrier and renamed World Cavalier. To Oceanus Navigation Corporation, Monrovia in 1968, renamed Frances. Scrapped at Kaohsiung in 1978.
- Chapultapec – Built in 1943 by Sun Shipbuilding & Drydock Co., Chester, Pennsylvania for the United States War Shipping Administration, Philadelphia. To Flanagan Loveland Shipping Co, Panama in 1947 and renamed Samuel C. Loveland. To Baltico Compagnia Navigacion S.A., Panama in 1951 and renamed Lucky Star. Renamed Falcon in 1960 and reflagged to Greece. Renamed Phalcon in 1965 and reflagged to Liberia. To Duarf International Ltd, Panama in 1976 and renamed Al Sayb. Used as a cement storage hulk. Deleted from Lloyd's Register in 1980.
- Charlestown – Built in 1943 by Sun Shipbuilding & Drydock Co., Chester, Pennsylvania for the United States War Shipping Administration, Philadelphia. To Panama Oceanic Lines, Panama in 1947. To Statel Compagnia se Vapores, Panama in 1956, renamed World Transporter. To Pavin Navigation Inc, Panama in 1959. Rebuilt as a 12,793 GRT bulk carrier and renamed World Crusader. To Overseas Carriers Corporation, New York in 1961, renamed Globe Carrier. To International Carriers Inc, New York in 1967, renamed Overseas Carrier in 1968. To Rector Navigation Corporation, Panama in 1974 and renamed Lily. Scrapped at Kaohsiung in 1978.
- Chateau Thierry – Built in 1945 by Sun Shipbuilding & Drydock Co., Chester, Pennsylvania for the United States War Shipping Administration, Philadelphia. Renamed Camp Union later that year. To Overseas Tankship Corporation, Panama in 1947. To Overseas Tankship (UK) Ltd, London in 1951 and renamed Caltex Sydney. Scrapped at Osaka in 1962.
- Chatterton Hill – Built in 1944 by Alabama Drydock and Shipbuilding Company, Mobile for the United States War Shipping Administration, Mobile. To Baltic Trading Co, London in 1947 and renamed Hyrcania. Scrapped at Bilbao in 1963.
- Chemawa – Built in 1945 by Kaiser Shipyards, Portland for the United States War Shipping Administration, Portland. To Lanmore Co. Inc, Panama in 1947 then Panama Transoceanic Co., S.A., Panama in 1948. Rebuilt to 14,424 GRT in 1960 and renamed Barbara Jane Conway. Scrapped at Bilbao in 1975.
- Cherry Valley – Built in 1942 by Sun Shipbuilding & Drydock Co., Chester, Pennsylvania for the United States War Shipping Administration, Philadelphia. To Keystone Tankship Corporation, Wilmington in 1945. To Charles Kurr & Co. Inc, Wilmington in 1970. Scrapped at Kaohsiung in 1971.
- Chesapeake Capes – Built in 1942 by Sun Shipbuilding & Drydock Co., Chester, Pennsylvania for the United States War Shipping Administration, Philadelphia. To Tidewater Associated Oil Company, Wilmington in 1947 and renamed Samuel O. Brown. To Western Ocean Transport Company, Wilmington in 1963 and renamed Point Loma. To Reconquista Maritima S.A., Panama in 1969 and renamed Loyal Ivory. Scrapped at Kaohsiung in 1972.
- Chicaca – Built in 1945 by Alabama Drydock and Shipbuilding Company, Mobile for the United States War Shipping Administration, Mobile. To Overseas Tankship Corporation, Panama in 1947. Renamed Caltex Saigon in 1952. To Overseas Tankship (UK) Ltd, London in 1959. Rebuilt in 1967 to 13,892 GRT. To Texaco Overseas Tankship Ltd, London in 1968 and renamed Texaco Saigon. Renamed Texaco Singapore in 1975. Scrapped at Kaohsiung in 1981.
- Chickamaugua – Built in 1943 by Sun Shipbuilding & Drydock Co., Chester, Pennsylvania for the United States War Shipping Administration, Philadelphia. To Alberto Ravano fu Pietro, Genoa in 1947 and renamed Utilitas. To Adriatico-Tirreno-Jonio-Ligure di Alberto Ravano & Figli, Genoa in 1948. Scrapped at La Spezia in 1962.
- Chisholm Trail – Built in 1945 by Kaiser Shipyards, Portland for the United States War Shipping Administration, Portland. To British Tanker Co, London in 1947. To Société Maritime des Petroles BP, Le Havre in 1955 and renamed Montsoreau. Collided with SS Isidora off Cape Spartel, Morocco on 6 December 1961 and was beached. Scrapped in 1962 at La Seyne-sur-Mer, Var, France.
- Choctaw Trail – Built in 1945 by Kaiser Shipyards, Portland for the United States War Shipping Administration, Portland. To Overseas Tankship Corporation, Panama in 1947. Renamed Caltex Manila in 1952. Scrapped at Hirao in 1966.
- Chrysler's Field – Built in 1943 by Sun Shipbuilding & Drydock Co., Chester, Pennsylvania for the United States War Shipping Administration, Philadelphia. To Imperial Oil Shipping Co, Montreal, Quebec, Canada in 1947 and renamed Imperial Winnipeg. To Compagnia Atlantica de Navigacion S.A., Panama in 1954 and renamed San Pablo. Scrapped at La Seyne-sur-Mer in 1962.
- Churubusco – Built in 1943 by Sun Shipbuilding & Drydock Co., Chester, Pennsylvania for the Texas Company, Wilmington. Renamed Minnesota in 1950 and Texaco Minnesota in 1960. Rebuilt in 1966, now 15,622 GRT. To Texaco Refining & Marketing Inc, Wilmington in 1984. Scrapped at Bangkok, Thailand in 1990.
- Clarke's Wharf – Built in 1945 by Sun Shipbuilding & Drydock Co., Chester, Pennsylvania for the United States War Shipping Administration, Philadelphia. To Trinidad Corporation, Wilmington in 1948 then California Tanker Company, Wilmington in 1952. To Standard Oil of California, San Francisco in 1962 and renamed Nevada Standard. Scrapped at Kaohsiung in 1972.
- Coalinga Hills – Built in 1943 by Marinship, Sausalito, California for the United States War Shipping Administration, San Francisco. To Sword Line Inc, New York in 1948. To Liquid Cargo Carriers, New York in 1962. Ran aground near Tanegashima, Japan on 23 January 1963. Consequently, scrapped at Hong Kong.
- Cobble Hill – Built in 1945 by Sun Shipbuilding & Drydock Co., Chester, Pennsylvania for the United States War Shipping Administration, Philadelphia. To Oriental Trade & Transport Co, London in 1947 and renamed Stanvac Melbourne. To Standard-Vacuum Transportation Co, London in 1955. Scrapped at Bombay, India in 1960.

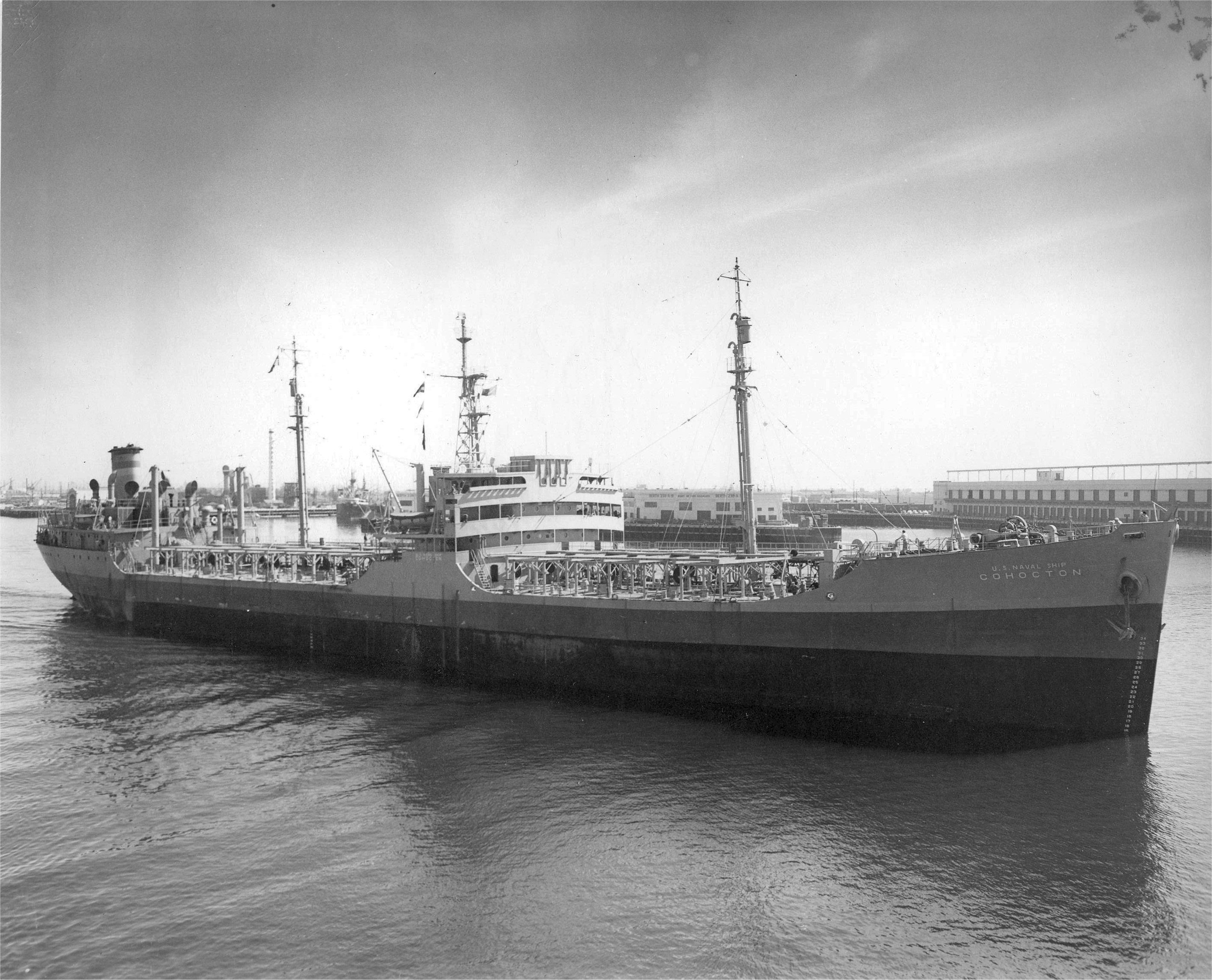
USNS Cohocton.

- USS Cohocton (T2-SE-A3 design) – Built in 1945 by Marinship, Sausalito, California for the United States Navy. To Military Sea Transportation Service in 1949 as USNS Cohocton (AO-101). To Hudson Waterways Corporation, New York in 1967, renamed Transoneida. Converted to container ship in 1969, now 7,666 GRT. To C.I.T. Leasing Corporation, New York in 1971. To American Pacific Container Line in 1980, renamed Pacific Economy but scrapped at Kaohsiung later that year.

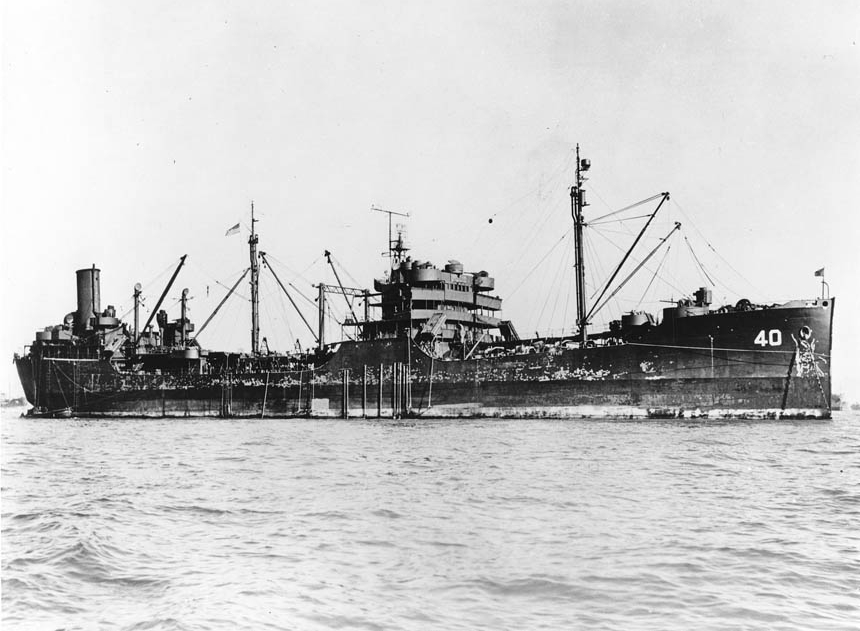
USS Lackawanna.

- Conastoga (Type T2) – Built in 1942 by Bethlehem Sparrows Point Shipyard, Bethlehem, Maryland for the United States War Shipping Administration. To United States Navy as USS Lackawanna (AO-40). To United States Maritime Commission in 1946, the Socony-Vacuum Oil Company, New York in 1947. Renamed Tatarrax. To Socony Mobil Oil Company, New York in 1955. Renamed Thomas A. in 1962. To Mobil Oil Corporation, New York in 1965 and renamed Padre Island. Scrapped at Vinaròs, Spain in 1967.
- Contreras – Built in 1942 by Sun Shipbuilding & Drydock Co., Chester, Pennsylvania for the Texas Company, Wilmington. Renamed Washington in 1950 and Texaco Washington in 1960. To Washington Carriers Inc, Wilmington in 1962, renamed Wilmington Carrier. Scrapped at Ferrol, Spain in 1964.
- Coquille – Built in 1945 by Kaiser Shipyards, Portland for the United States War Shipping Administration, Portland. To American Pacific Steamship Company, Los Angeles in 1948, renamed Ampac Washington. To J. M. Carras Inc, New York in 1954 and renamed Mayflower. To Chemical Transporter Inc, Wilmington in 1954, renamed Chemical Transporter in 1955. To Marine Navigation Inc, New York in 1965, renamed Marine Chemical Transporter. To Union Carbide Corporation, New York in 1970. Scrapped at Kaohsiung in 1984.
- Corinth – Built in 1942 by Sun Shipbuilding & Drydock Co., Chester, Pennsylvania for the United States War Shipping Administration, Philadelphia. To Alberto Ravano fu Pietro, Genoa in 1947 and renamed Charitas. Scrapped at Vado Ligure in 1966.

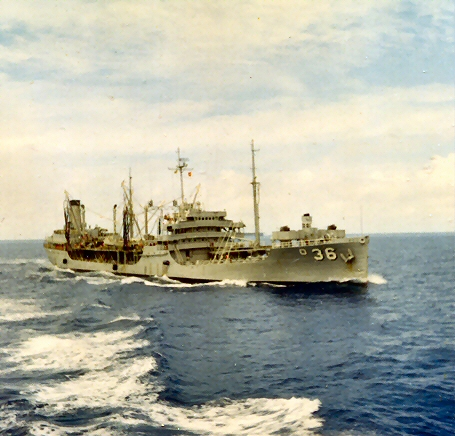
USS Kennebec.

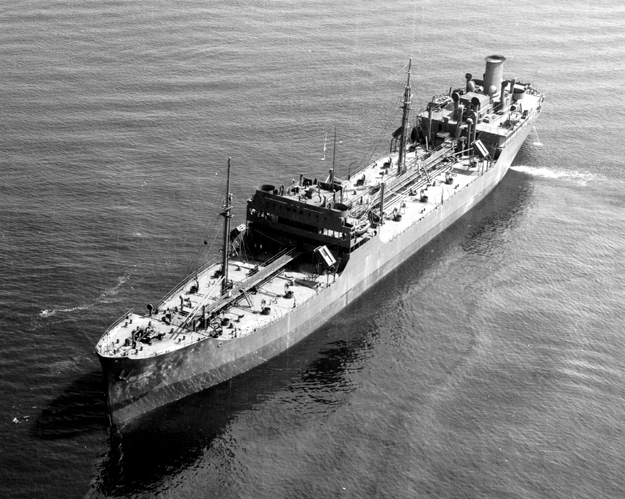
USS Pecos.

- Corsicana (T2 design) – Built in 1941 by Bethlehem Sparrows Point Shipyard, Bethlehem, Maryland for Socony Vacuum Oil Company, New York. To United States Navy in 1942 as USS Kennebec (AO-36). Decommissioned in 1970 and laid up, scrapped in 1982.
- Corsicana – Built in 1942 by Sun Shipbuilding & Drydock Co., Chester, Pennsylvania. To United States Navy as USS Pecos (AO-65). To United States Maritime Commission in 1947 but returned to the United States Navy in 1948. To Military Sea Transportation Service in 1950 as USNS Pecos (AO-65). In service in 1970 but later transferred to the United States Maritime Administration and laid up. Scrapped at Baltimore in 1975.
- Corvallis – Built in 1943 by Kaiser Shipyards, Portland for the United States War Shipping Administration, Portland. To Poleno Società di Navigazione, Genoa in 1948 and renamed Strombo. To Società Nationale Metanodotti, Genoa in 1960 and renamed Strip Khorramshahr. Scrapped at Trieste, Italy in 1964.
- Cottonwood Creek – Built in 1944 by Alabama Drydock and Shipbuilding Company, Mobile for the United States War Shipping Administration, Mobile. To British Tanker Co, London in 1947. To Société Maritime des Petroles BP, Dunkerque, France in 1955 and renamed Brissac. To Zeeland Transportation Corporation, Monrovia in 1959. Converted to bulk carrier, now 10,232 GRT, renamed Bulk Mariner. To Bulk Transport Inc, New York in 1960, renamed Cottonwood Creek. Wrecked off Honduras on 5 January 1970 whilst of a voyage from New Orleans to Saigon, Vietnam.
- Coulee Dam – Built in 1944 by Kaiser Shipyards, Portland for the United States War Shipping Administration, Portland. To the French Government in 1947 and renamed Shapur. Renamed Fernand-Gilabert in 1948. To Société Maritimes des Petroles BP in 1955. Collided with Melika off Oman on 13 September 1958 and was damaged by fire. Scrapped at Bombay in 1959.
- Council Crest – Built in 1945 by Kaiser Shipyards, Portland for the United States War Shipping Administration, Portland. To Anglo Saxon Petroleum Co, London in 1947 and renamed Trochurus. To Shell Petroleum Ltd, London in 1955 and Shell Tankers Ltd, London in 1960. Scrapped at Port Glasgow in 1962.
- Council Grove – Built in 1945 by Alabama Drydock and Shipbuilding Company, Mobile for the United States War Shipping Administration, Mobile. To Cities Service Oil Company, New York in 1946. To Tankships Inc, New York in 1961, rebuilt to 15,254 GRT. To International Ocean Transport Corporation, Philadelphia in 1976 then Cove Tide Corporation, New York in 1980. Renamed Cove Tide. Scrapped at Gadani Beach in 1983.

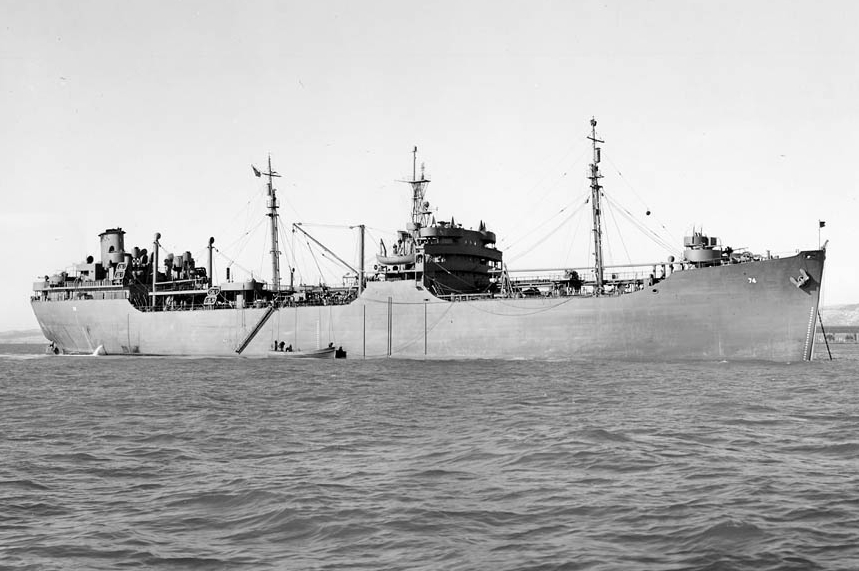
USS Saranac.

- Cowpens – Built in 1942 by Sun Shipbuilding & Drydock Co., Chester, Pennsylvania for the United States War Shipping Administration, Philadelphia. Renamed Saranac later that year then to United States Navy as USS Saranac (AO-74). Converted to floating power plant in 1946. Redesignated USS Saranac (YPF-9) in 1954. Sold to Hugo Neu Corporation in 1957, renamed Somerset in 1959. Subsequent fate unknown.
- Coxcomb Hill – Built in 1945 by Kaiser Shipyards, Portland for the United States War Shipping Administration, Portland. To Richfield Oil Corporation, Los Angeles in 1947. Renamed David E. Day in 1951. To Locust Tankers Inc, Wilmington in 1957. Rebuilt to 12,228 GRT. Scrapped at Brownsville in 1976.
- Coyote Hills – Built in 1945 by Marinship, Sausalito, California for the United States War Shipping Administration, San Francisco. To N.V. phs van Ommen, Rotterdam, Netherlands in 1948, renamed Woensdrecht. Scrapped at Kaohsiung in 1962.
- Crater Lake – Built in 1944 by Kaiser Shipyards, Portland for the United States War Shipping Administration, Portland. To Carmo Gamelli, Genoa in 1948, renamed Montallegro. Exploded and broke in two at Naples on 16 March 1951 but subsequently repaired. Scrapped at La Spezia in 1965.
- Cross Keys – Built in 1942 by Sun Shipbuilding & Drydock Co., Chester, Pennsylvania for the Gulf Oil Corporation, Philadelphia. Renamed Gulfstream in 1947. To Bayview Steamship Corporation, New York and renamed Wang Explorer. To Cape Waterways Corporation, New York in 1960 and renamed Columbia. Scrapped at Savona, Italy in 1963.
- Crow Wing – Built in 1945 by Alabama Drydock and Shipbuilding Company, Mobile for the United States War Shipping Administration, Mobile. To Anglo Saxon Petroleum Co, London in 1947 and renamed Techtus. To Shell Petroleum Ltd, London in 1955 and Shell Tankers Ltd, London in 1960. Scrapped at Blyth, Northumberland in 1961.
- Crown Point – Built in 1943 by Sun Shipbuilding & Drydock Co., Chester, Pennsylvania for the United States War Shipping Administration, Philadelphia. To Independent Tankships Inc, Wilmington in 1948 then Allied-Ashland Tankers Inc, Wilmington later that year. To Greenpoint Tankers Inc, Wilmington in 1955, renamed Greenpoint. To Texaco Inc, Wilmington in 1960, renamed Texaco Kansas and rebuilt to 14,153 GRT. Scrapped at Brownsville in 1984.

== D ==
- Diamond Island – Built in 1944 by Sun Shipbuilding & Drydock Co., Chester, Pennsylvania for the United States War Shipping Administration, Philadelphia, Pennsylvania. To The Texas Company, Wilmington, Delaware in 1947. Renamed South Carolina in 1948 and Texaco South Carolina in 1960. To American Trading & Production Corporation, Baltimore, Maryland in 1969. Rebuilt to 15,128 GRT and renamed Texas Trader. To American Trading Transportation Company, New York in 1972. Scrapped at Santander, Spain in 1986.
- Dobytown Built in 1945 by Alabama Drydock and Shipbuilding Company, Mobile, Alabama for the United States War Shipping Administration, Mobile. To the French Government in 1947 and renamed La Mede. To Compagnie Africaine d'Armement, Le Havre in 1948 and renamed Celimene. To Madison Steamship Corporation, Monrovia, Liberia in 1961 and renamed Finisterre. Rebuilt as a bulk carrier in 1963, now 14,133 GRT and renamed Skopelos. To Astromarine Corporation, Monrovia in 1965 and renamed Asteri. Renamed Mount Athos in 1973. Scrapped at La Spezia, Italy in 1978.
- Dominguez Hills – Built in 1945 by Marinship, Sausalito, California for the United States War Shipping Administration, San Francisco, California. To American Viking Corporation, Wilmington, Delaware in 1948 and renamed Destiny. To Park Tanker Corporation, Monrovia in 1956 and renamed Rondo. Scrapped at Kaohsiung, Taiwan in 1966.
- Donner Lake – Built in 1944 by Kaiser Company, Portland, Oregon for the United States War Shipping Administration, Portland. To Société Maritime Shell, Le Havre, France in 1948 and renamed Minerve. Scrapped at Castellón de la Plana, Spain in 1964.
- Drapers Meadows – Built in 1945 by Sun Shipbuilding & Drydock Co., Chester, Pennsylvania for the United States War Shipping Administration, Philadelphia. To Overseas Tankship Corporation, Panama in 1948. To Overseas Tankship (UK) Ltd, London, United Kingdom in 1960, renamed Caltex Auckland. Scrapped at Hirao, Japan in 1962.
- Drewry's Bluff – Built in 1944 by Sun Shipbuilding & Drydock Co., Chester, Pennsylvania for the United States War Shipping Administration, Philadelphia. To Gulf Oil Corporation, Philadelphia in 1947 and renamed Gulfbrand. To Emder Tankschiff GmbH, Emden, West Germany in 1960 and renamed Emsadler. Scrapped at Castellón de la Plana in 1966.

== E ==
- Edge Hill – Built in 1944 by Sun Shipbuilding & Drydock Co., Chester, Pennsylvania for the United States War Shipping Administration, Philadelphia, Pennsylvania. To Sabine Transportation Company, Baltimore, Maryland in 1947 and renamed R. P. Smith. Rebuilt in 1964, now 11,836 GRT. Renamed Sabine in 1964. To Ship Operators Corporation, New York in 1965. Rebuilt in 1966 with bow section of Isidora, now 19,391 GRT. To Navegaçion Goya S.A., Panama in 1970 then Navegaçion Elizabeth S.A., Panama in 1973 and renamed Elizabeth. Scrapped at Split, Yugoslavia in 1975.
- Egg Harbor – Built in 1943 by Kaiser Company, Portland, Oregon for the United States War Shipping Administration, Portland. To Southern Steamships (Pty) Ltd, Cape Town, South Africa in 1947, renamed President Brand. To Valiente Compagnia Navigaçion, Monrovia, Liberia in 1951, renamed Valiente. To Kyanos Steamship Corporation, Monrovia in 1954, renamed Kyanos. To Southern Steamships (Pty) Ltd, Cape Town in 1959, renamed President Reitz. To Europa Shipping Corporation, Piraeus, Greece in 1960 and renamed Marathon. Rebuilt as bulk carrier in 1962, now 15,030 GRT. Renamed Marathonian in 1967 and reflagged to Liberia. To Omnium Transportation Co, Panama in 1974 and renamed Sylvia M. Ossa. To Omnium Leader Corporation, Panama in 1975. Last reported at 32°00′N 68°15′W on 12 October 1976, presumed subsequently foundered with the loss of all hands.
- El Caney – Built in 1945 by Alabama Drydock and Shipbuilding Company, Mobile, Alabama for the United States War Shipping Administration, Mobile. To Petroleum Navigation Corporation, Wilmington, Delaware in 1948 and renamed Republic. To Trafalgar Steamship Corporation, Wilmington in 1950. To Alexander S. Onassis Corporation, Monrovia, Liberia in 1957 then Rosedale Navigation Corporation, Monrovia in 1962. Scrapped at Castellón de la Plana, Spain in 1964.
- El Morro – Built in 1944 by Kaiser Company, Portland for the United States War Shipping Administration, Portland. To British Tanker Company, London, United Kingdom in 1947. To BP Tanker Co, London in 1956. Scrapped at Blyth, Northumberland, United Kingdom in 1959.
- Elk Basin – Built in 1944 by Kaiser Company, Portland for the United States War Shipping Administration, Portland. To Standard Vacuum Oil Company, Wilmington in 1948, renamed Stanvac Bombay. Reflagged to Panama in 1955. Scrapped at Keelung, Taiwan in 1962.
- Elk Hills – Built in 1943 by Marinship, Sausalito, California for the United States War Shipping Administration, San Francisco, California. To Athina Maritime Company, Piraeus in 1948, renamed Ioannis Zafirakis. To South Mediterranean Shipping Company, Piraeus in 1965. Scrapped at Hirao, Japan in 1966.

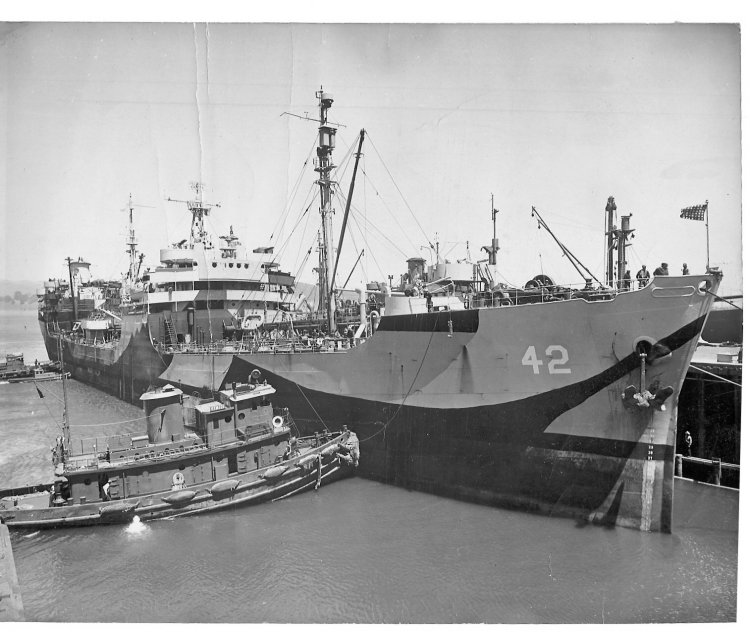
USS Monongahela.

- Ellkay (T2-A design) – Built in 1942 by Sun Shipbuilding & Drydock Co, Chester for United States War Shipping Administration. To United States Navy later that year and commissioned as USS Monongahela (AO-42). To Military Sea Transportation Service in 1951. Placed in reserve in 1957. Scrapped at Brownsville, Texas in 1982.
- Elwood Hills – Built in 1945 by Marinship, Sausalito for the United States War Shipping Administration, San Francisco. To Skips A/S Hidlefjord, Stavanger, Norway in 1948, renamed Lifjord. To Transatlantic Navigation Corporation, Monrovia in 1959, renamed Transpacific but scrapped at Kaohsiung, Taiwan later that year.

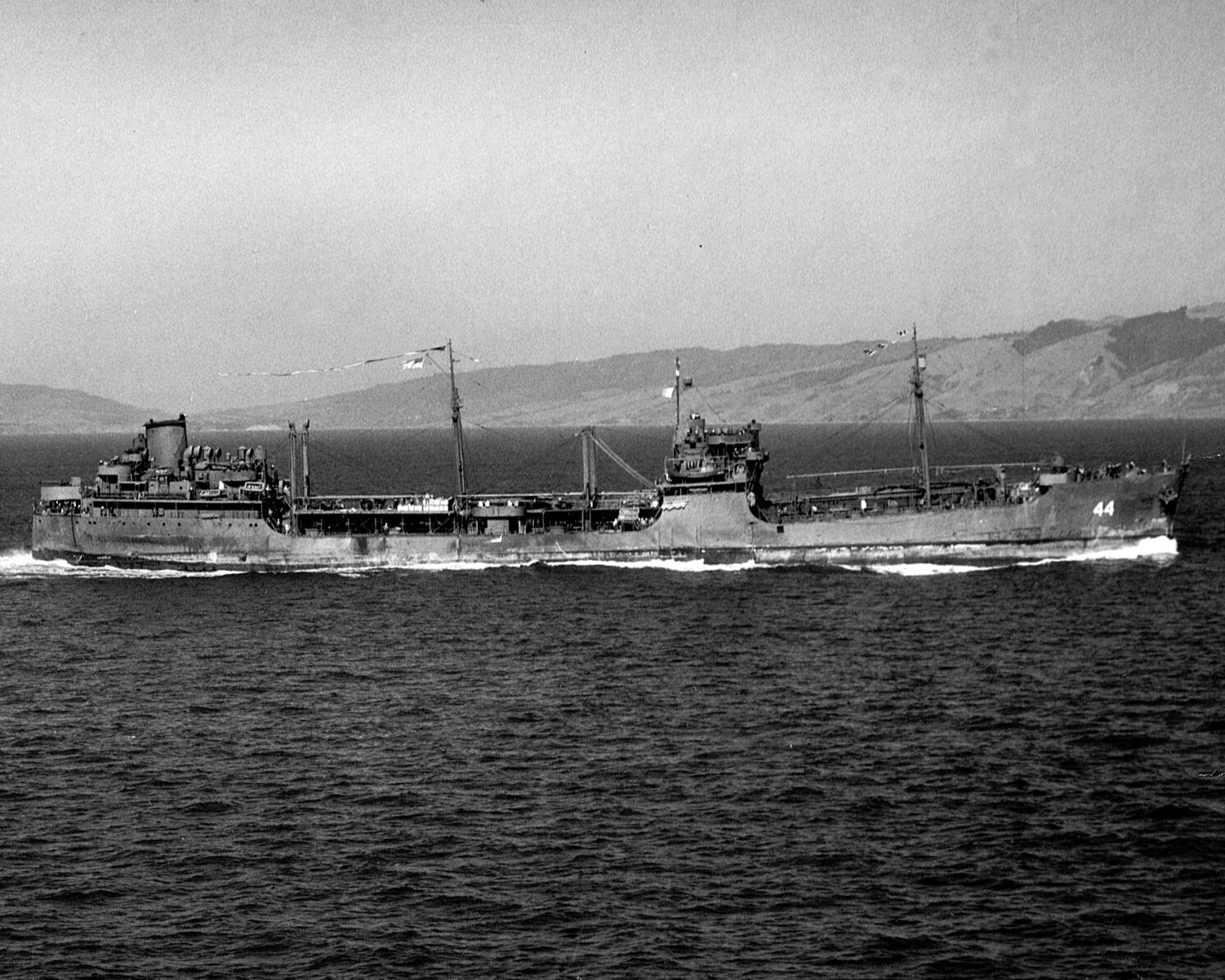
USS Patuxent.

- Emmkay (T2-A design) – Built in 1942 by Sun Shipbuilding & Drydock Co, Chester for the Keystone Company. To the United States Navy later that year and commissioned as USS Patuxent (AO-44). Sold to Pure Oil Company, Chicago, Illinois in 1946 and renamed David D. Irwin. Rebuilt in 1961, now 15,376 GRT. Renamed Fairwind in 1985, scrapped at Mombasa, Kenya later that year.

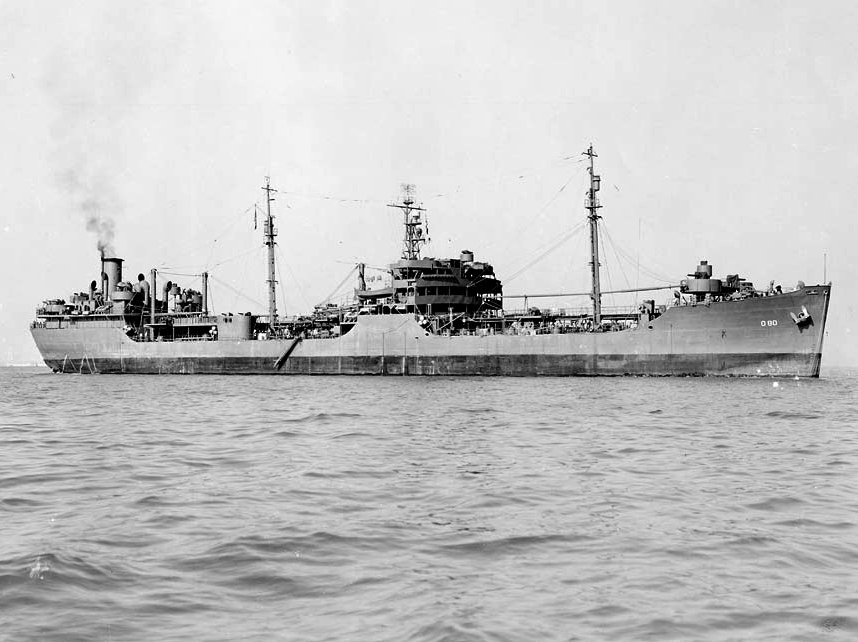
USS Escambia.

- USS Escambia (T2-SE-A2 design) – Built in 1943 by Marinship, Sausalito for the United States Navy. To Military Sea Transportation Service in 1950 as USNS Escambia (T-AO-80). Out of service in 1957, to United States Army in 1966, converted to a mobile power plant. To Vietnam Government, scrapped in 1971.
- Esso Camden – Built in 1944 by Sun Shipbuilding Co, Chester for Standard Oil Company of New Jersey, Wilmington. To Esso Shipping Company, Wilmington in 1950. To Panama Transport Co, Panama in 1956. Scrapped at Vado Ligure, Italy in 1961.
- Esso Gettysburg – Built in 1942 by Sun Shipbuilding Co, Chester for Standard Oil Company of New Jersey, Wilmington. Torpedoed and sunk in the Atlantic Ocean (31°02′N 79°17′W) by U-66 on 10 June 1943 with the loss of 57 of her 72 crew. Survivors were rescued by USAT George Washington.
- Esso Memphis – Built in 1944 by Sun Shipbuilding Co, Chester for Standard Oil Company of New Jersey, Wilmington. To Esso Shipping Company, Wilmington in 1950. To United States Department of Commerce, Wilmington in 1956, renamed Memphis. To Military Sea Transportation Service later that year as USNS Memphis (T-AO-162). To United States Department of Commerce in 1957. To United States Army in 1966, used as a floating power plant at Qu Nhon, Vietnam. Scrapped at Kaohsiung in 1969.

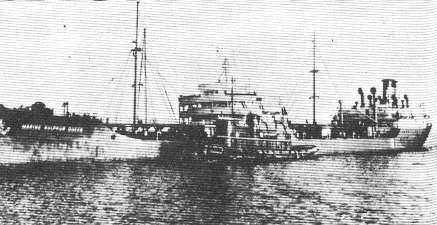
Marine Sulphur Queen.

- Esso New Haven – Built in 1944 by Sun Shipbuilding Co, Chester for Standard Oil Company of New Jersey, Wilmington. To Esso Shipping Company, Wilmington in 1950. To Marine Sulphur Transport Corporation, Wilmington in 1960. Converted to molten sulphur carrier, renamed Marine Sulphur Queen. Foundered in the Straits of Florida on or after 4 February with the loss of all hands.
- Esso Paterson – Built in 1942 by Sun Shipbuilding Co, Chester for Standard Oil Company of New Jersey, Wilmington. To Esso Shipping Company, Wilmington in 1950. To Humble Oil & Refining Company, Wilmington in 1960. To Union Carbide Corporation, New York in 1961. Rebuilt as chemical tanker and container ship. Now 9,141 GRT and renamed Carbide Texas City. Scrapped at Brownsville in 1979.
- Esso Portland – Built in 1944 by Sun Shipbuilding Co, Chester for Standard Oil Company of New Jersey, Wilmington. To Esso Shipping Company, Wilmington in 1950. To Panama Transport Co, Panama in 1957 the Commercial Tankers Inc, Buenos Aires, Argentina in 1960, renamed Petrosud. Scrapped at Kaohsiung in 1968.
- Esso Roanoke – Built in 1942 by Sun Shipbuilding Co, Chester for Standard Oil Company of New Jersey, Wilmington. To Esso Shipping Company, Wilmington in 1950. To United States Department of Commerce in 1956, renamed Roanoke, then to Military Sea Transportation Service as USNS Roanoke (T-AOR-155). To United States Department of Commerce in 1957. Rebuilt to container ship in 1966 with bow section of Baltimore, now 10,948 GRT. To Monterey Transportation Company, Wilmington in 1970, renamed Baltimore. Scrapped at Kaohsiung in 1985.
- Esso Scranton – Built in 1944 by Sun Shipbuilding Co, Chester for Standard Oil Company of New Jersey, Wilmington. To Esso Shipping Company, Wilmington in 1950. To Humble Oil & Refining Company, Wilmington in 1960. To Humble Transportation Company, Wilmington in 1969 then Esso Transport Co, Panama in 1971. Scrapped at Kaohsiung in 1973.
- Esso Springfield – Built in 1944 by Sun Shipbuilding Co, Chester for Standard Oil Company of New Jersey, Wilmington. To Esso Shipping Company, Wilmington in 1950. To Panama Transport Co, Panama in 1956. To Oswego Bulk Carriers Inc, Monrovia in 1960, renamed Oswego Voyager. Scrapped at Hirao in 1965.
- Esso Utica – Built in 1944 by Sun Shipbuilding Co, Chester for Standard Oil Company of New Jersey, Wilmington. To Esso Shipping Company, Wilmington in 1950. To Empire Tanker S.A., Monrovia in 1957, renamed Glen Cove. To Texaco (Panama) Inc, Monrovia in 1960. Rebuilt to 14,396 GRT in 1961, renamed Texaco London. Reflagged to Panama in 1971 and renamed Texaco Cocle. Sold in 1976, renamed Polaris 1. Driven ashore on San Andrés Island, Columbia on 3 July 1976. Scrapped at Brownsville in 1977.
- Esso Washington – Built in 1942 by Sun Shipbuilding Co, Chester for Standard Oil Company of New Jersey, Wilmington. Wrecked near the Enewetok Atoll, Marshall Islands on 14 March 1945.

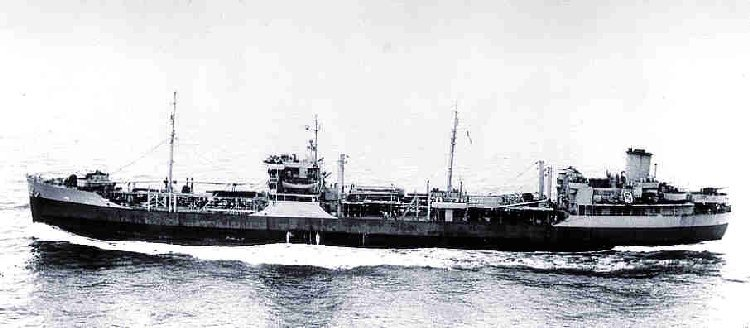
USS Chepachet.

- Eutaw Springs – Built in 1943 by Sun Shipbuilding Co, Chester the United States War Shipping Administration. To United States Navy as USS Chepachet (AO-78). To Military Sea Transportation Service in 1946 as USNS Chepachet (T-AO-78). Out of service in 1950. To United States Department of Energy in 1980. Converted to research ship, renamed Ocean Energy Converter. Scrapped in Hawaii in 1982.
- Evans Creek – Built in 1943 by Alabama Drydock and Shipbuilding Company, Mobile for the United States War Shipping Administration, Mobile. To National Bulk Carriers, Wilmington in 1948. To Hess Tankship Company, Wilmington in 1955, renamed Hess Petrol. Rebuilt in 1961, now 13,908 GRT. To Colby Shipping Inc, New York in 1976, renamed Virgo. Scrapped at Gadani Beach, Pakistan in 1982.

== F ==
- Fairfax – Built in 1943 by Sun Shipbuilding & Drydock Co., Chester, Pennsylvania for the United States War Shipping Administration, Philadelphia, Pennsylvania. To Compagnia Navigazione Cisterna, Genoa, Italy in 1947, renamed Americano. To Omnium Navigation Co, Monrovia, Liberia in 1959. Rebuilt as 15,052 GRT bulk carrier, renamed Omnium Pioneer. To Victory Transport Inc, New York in 1961, renamed Hudson. Scrapped at Kaohsiung, Taiwan in 1971.
- Fallen Timbers – Built in 1943 by Kaiser Company, Portland, Oregon for the United States War Shipping Administration, Portland. To Carl Olsens Tankrederi, Arendal, Norway in 1948, renamed Buccinum. To Fratelli d'Amico, Rome, Italy in 1951, renamed Massiminociro D. Scrapped at Trieste, Italy in 1965.
- Fisher's Hill – Built in 1943 by Sun Shipbuilding & Drydock Co., Chester for the United States War Shipping Administration, Philadelphia. To National Bulk Carriers, New York in 1948. To Sabine Transportation Company, Baltimore, Maryland in 1953, renamed Neches. Rebuilt in 1957, now 11,223 GRT. To American Trading & Production Corporation, Baltimore in 1965, renamed American Trader. Rebuilt in 1967, now 15,052 GRT. To American Trading Transportation Company, New York in 1972. Scrapped at Chittagong, India in 1985.
- Five Forks – Built in 1943 by Sun Shipbuilding & Drydock Co., Chester for the United States War Shipping Administration, Philadelphia. To National Bulk CarrierS Inc, Wilmington, Delaware in 1948. To Rockland Steamship Corporation, New York in 1956, renamed Mount Vernon. To Zeeland Transportation Ltd, Monrovia in 1957. Scrapped at Willebroek, Belgium in 1960.
- Forbes Road – Built in 1944 by Kaiser Company, Portland for the United States War Shipping Administration, Portland. To Cleveland Petroleum Co, London, United Kingdom in 1947, renamed Cleveland. To Enrico Insom, Rome in 1953, renamed Enrico Insom. To Italian Navy in 1959, commissioned as Sterope (A5368). Scrapped at La Spezia, Italy in 1979.
- Fort Bridger – Built in 1944 by Alabama Drydock and Shipbuilding Company, Mobile, Alabama for the United States War Shipping Administration, Mobile. To United States Petroleum Carriers Inc, New York in 1948. To Alexander S. Onassis Corporation, Monrovia in 1957 then Sunstone Marine Panama S.A., Monrovia in 1962. Renamed Archer in 1963. Scrapped at Kaohsiung in 1970.
- Fort Caspar – Built in 1945 by Sun Shipbuilding & Drydock Co., Chester for the United States War Shipping Administration, Philadelphia. To Atlantic Refining Co, Philadelphia in 1946, renamed Atlantic Explorer. To Tideway Steamship Corporation, New York in 1958, renamed Wang Hunter. To Globe Waterways Corporation, New York in 1960, renamed Transnorthern. To Fox Shipping Inc, New York in 1962. Rebuilt as 14,192 GRT bulk carrier, renamed Inger. To The Reynolds Metals Company, New York in 1978. To Sealift Bulkers Inc, New York in 1985. Scrapped at Alang, India in 1995.
- Fort Charlotte – Built in 1945 by Kaiser Company, Portland for the United States War Shipping Administration, Portland. To National Bulk Carriers Inc, New York in 1948. To Hess Tankship Corporation, Wilmington in 1955, renamed Hess Trader. Rebuilt in 1961, now 13,908 GRT. To Amherst Shipping Inc, Wilmington in 1977, renamed Trader then Aries later that year. Renamed Scorpio in 1980. Scrapped at Tuxpan, Mexico in 1986.
- Fort Cheswell – Built in 1945 by Sun Shipbuilding & Drydock Co., Chester for the United States War Shipping Administration, Philadelphia. To Stanhope Steamship Co, London in 1947, renamed Stanwell. To A/S Sjøfart, Lillesand, Norway in 1959, renamed Landbreeze. To Panargy Shipping Corporation, Monrovia in 1960, renamed Panargy I. To Maryland (International) Ltd, Monrovia in 1961, renamed Sirod in 1963. To Compagnia Naviera Capistrano S.A., Monrovia in 1963, renamed Capistrano. Scrapped at Kaohsiung in 1967.
- Fort Christina – Built in 1945 by Kaiser Company, Portland for the United States War Shipping Administration, Portland. To Overseas Tankship Corporation, Panama in 1948 then Overseas Tankship (UK) Ltd, London in 1950. Renamed Caltex Glasgow in 1951. Scrapped at Hirao, Japan in 1960.
- Fort Clatsop – Built in 1944 by Kaiser Company, Portland for the United States War Shipping Administration, Portland. To Standard Oil Company of California, San Francisco, California in 1948. Renamed Oregon Standard in 1957. Collided with Arizona Standard at San Francisco on 18 January 1971. Bow section used to rebuild Arizona Standard. Rebuilt with bow section from Petrolite to form container ship. Scrapped at Kaohsiung in 1976.
- Fort Cornwallis – Built in 1944 by Sun Shipbuilding & Drydock Co., Chester for the United States War Shipping Administration, Philadelphia. To Standard Oil Company of New Jersey, Wilmington in 1946, renamed Esso Parkersburg. To Esso Shipping Company, Wilmington in 1950. To United States Department of Commerce, Wilmington in 1956 then to Military Sea Transportation Service as USNS Parkersburg (T-AO-163). Returned to United States Department of Commerce in 1957. To Marine Chemical Carrier Corporation, Wilmington in 1968, rebuilt in 1969 as a chemical tanker, now 15,883 GRT. To E. I. Du Pont de Nemours & Co., Wilmington in 1978. Scrapped at Kaohsiung in 1984.
- Fort Cumberland – Built in 1944 by Sun Shipbuilding & Drydock Co., Chester for the United States War Shipping Administration, Philadelphia. To Standard Oil Company of New Jersey, Wilmington in 1946, renamed Esso Cumberland. To Esso Shipping Company, Wilmington in 1950. To United States Department of Commerce in 1956, renamed Cumberland then to Military Sea Transportation Service as USNS Cumberland (T-AO-153). Returned to United States Department of Commerce in 1957. To United States Army in 1966, used as a floating power plant at Cam Ranh Bay. Scrapped at Kaohsiung in 1972.
- Fort Dearborn – Built in 1943 by Kaiser Company, Portland for the United States War Shipping Administration, Portland. Broke in two in the Pacific Ocean 800 nautical miles (1,500 km) north west of Honolulu, Hawaii on 12 March 1947. Bow section shelled and sunk. Stern section sold to Hilo Electric Light Company, Honolulu for use as a floating power station. Scrapped at Terminal Island, California in 1952.
- Fort Donelson – Built in 1943 by Kaiser Company, Portland for the United States War Shipping Administration, Portland. To Acadia Overseas Freighters, Halifax, Nova Scotia, Canada in 1948, renamed Haligonian Lad, To Victor Panamanian Steamship Co, Panama in 1949, renamed Los Hermanos. To Compagnia Marittimo Carlo Cameli, Genoa in 1968, renamed Niasca. To Greek American Shipbuilding & Repair Corporation, Panama in 1973, renamed Lonado. Converted to tank cleaning hulk in 1975, based at Syros Greece.

USS Cowanesque.

- Fort Duquesne – Built in 1944 by Sun Shipbuilding & Drydock Co., Chester. To United States Navy, commissioned at USS Cowanesque (AO-79). To United States Maritime Commission in 1946, but returned to the United States Navy in 1947. To Military Sea Transportation Service in 1949 as USNS Cowanesque (T-AO-79), later USNS Cowanesque (T-AOT-79). Sunk off Okinawa, Japan on 23 April 1972.
- Fort Erie – Built in 1943 by Kaiser Company, Portland for the United States War Shipping Administration, Portland. To Società Italiana di Armamento Sidarma, Venice, Italy in 1948, renamed Serenissima. Scrapped at Trieste in 1961.
- Fort Fetterman – Built in 1944 by Alabama Drydock and Shipbuilding Company, Mobile for the United States War Shipping Administration, Mobile. To Independent Tankships Inc, Wilmington in 1948. To Charles Kurtz & Company, Wilmington in 1955. Rebuilt in 1958, now 12,634 GRT. Scrapped at Kaohsiung in 1976.
- Fort Frederica – Built in 1943 by Kaiser Company, Portland for the United States War Shipping Administration, Portland. To British Tanker Co, London in 1947 then BP Tanker Co, London in 1955. Scrapped at Hong Kong in 1959.
- Fort George – Built in 1943 by Kaiser Company, Portland for the United States War Shipping Administration, Portland. To America Overseas Tankship Corporation, Panama in 1948. To World Truth Corporation, Monrovia in 1956, renamed World Truth. Rebuilt as a bulk carrier in 1961, now 14,309 GRT and renamed World Conqueror. To Amphitryon Shipping Ltd, Monrovia in 1962 then Atlantic Navigation Corporation, Monrovia in 1967, renamed Paulina. Scrapped at Kaohsiung in 1977.
- Fort Henry – Built in 1943 by Kaiser Company, Portland for the United States War Shipping Administration, Portland. To Harcon Marine Co. Inc, New York in 1948, renamed Ponca City. Rebuilt in 1967. Bow section joined to stern of Santa Suzana to form Conoco Humber. Stern section joined to bow section of Santa Suzana to form 17,116 GRT Seafarer for Marine Carriers Inc, New York. To Topaz Shipping Corporation, Panama in 1973, renamed Burmah Topaz. Scrapped at Split, Yugoslavia in 1976.
- Fort Hoskins – Built in 1945 by Kaiser Company, Portland for the United States War Shipping Administration, Portland. To Cities Service Oil Company, New York in 1947. To Tankships Inc, New York in 1961. Rebuilt, now 15,221 GRT. To International Ocean Transport Corporation, New York in 1976 then Sabine Towing & Transportation Company, Baltimore in 1978, renamed Red River. Scrapped at Kaohsiung in 1984.
- Fort Jupiter – Built in 1944 by Sun Shipbuilding & Drydock Co., Chester for the United States War Shipping Administration, Philadelphia. To Stanhope Steamship Co, London in 1947, renamed Stanmore. Scrapped at Faslane, Dunbartonshire in 1960.
- Fort Lane – Built in 1945 by Kaiser Company, Portland for the United States War Shipping Administration, Portland. To Lanmor Co Inc, Panama in 1948 then Fort Lane Corporation, Panama in 1950. To Panama Transport Co, Panama in 1957, renamed Esso Nassau. To Compagnia di Petroleo Lago, Maracaibo, Venezuela in 1958, renamed Esso La Salina. To Panama Transport & Navigation Co, Panama in 1962, renamed Esso Cristobal then to Stefanos N. Difonis, Piraeus later that year, renamed Phoinix. To United Cross Navigation Corporation, Monrovia in 1963, renamed Phoinix I. To Alcon Ltd, Monrovia later that year. Scrapped at Kaohsiung in 1965.
- Fort Laramie – Built in 1943 by Alabama Drydock and Shipbuilding Company, Mobile for the United States War Shipping Administration, Mobile. To Standard Marine Transport Company, Wilmington in 1948, renamed R. F. McConnell. To University of Chicago, Wilmington in 1949. Rebuilt in 1958, now 12,638 GRT and renamed Amoco Louisiana. To Marine Petroleum Carrier Corporation, Delaware in 1963. Scrapped at Castellón de la Plana in 1973.

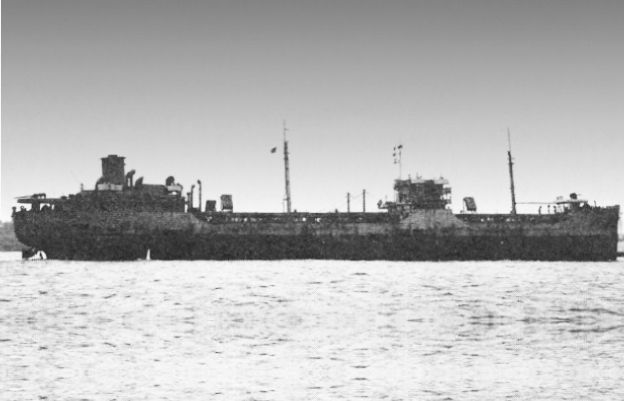
Fort Lee.

- Fort Lee – Built in 1944 by Sun Shipbuilding & Drydock Co., Chester for the United States War Shipping Administration, Philadelphia. Torpedoed and sunk in the Indian Ocean by German submarine U-181 on 2 November 1944 with the loss of ten of her 60 crew.
- Fort Massiac – Built in 1945 by Sun Shipbuilding & Drydock Co., Chester for the United States War Shipping Administration, Philadelphia. To Lanmore Co. Inc, Panama in 1947. To Panama Transport Co, Panama in 1949, renamed Esso Valparaiso. To Esso Petroleum Co, London in 1959, renamed Esso Avonmouth. To Athlos Compagnia Navigazione, Piraeus in 1960, renamed Athlos. Rebuilt in 1962 as 13,570 GRT bulk carrier. Scrapped at Bilbao, Spain in 1975.
- Fort Matanzas – Built in 1945 by Kaiser Company, Portland for the United States War Shipping Administration, Portland. To Anglo Saxon Petroleum Co, London in 1948, renamed Trochiscus. To Shell Petroleum Ltd, London in 1955 then Shell Tankers Ltd, London in 1960. Scrapped at Hong Kong in 1961.
- Fort McHenry – Built in 1943 by Kaiser Company, Portland for the United States War Shipping Administration, Portland. To T. C. Munakalat Vekaleti, Istanbul, Turkey in 1948, renamed Kocaeli. To Denizcilik Bankasi TAO, Istanbul in 1952 then D.B. Deniz Nakliyati TAO, Istanbul in 1955. Laid up in 1959, scrapped at Istanbul in 1964.
- Fort Meigs – Built in 1943 by Kaiser Company, Portland for the United States War Shipping Administration, Portland. To Meveo Inc, New York in 1948 then United States Navigation Co, New York in 1949. To Colonial Steamship Corporation, New York in 1950, renamed Seathunder. To Delhi Steamship Corporation, Wilmington in 1953 then Preston Corporation of Monrovia later that year. To Nikki Steamship Corporation, Monrovia in 1959, renamed Valiant Nikki. Scrapped at Hendrik-Ido-Ambacht, South Holland, Netherlands in 1960.

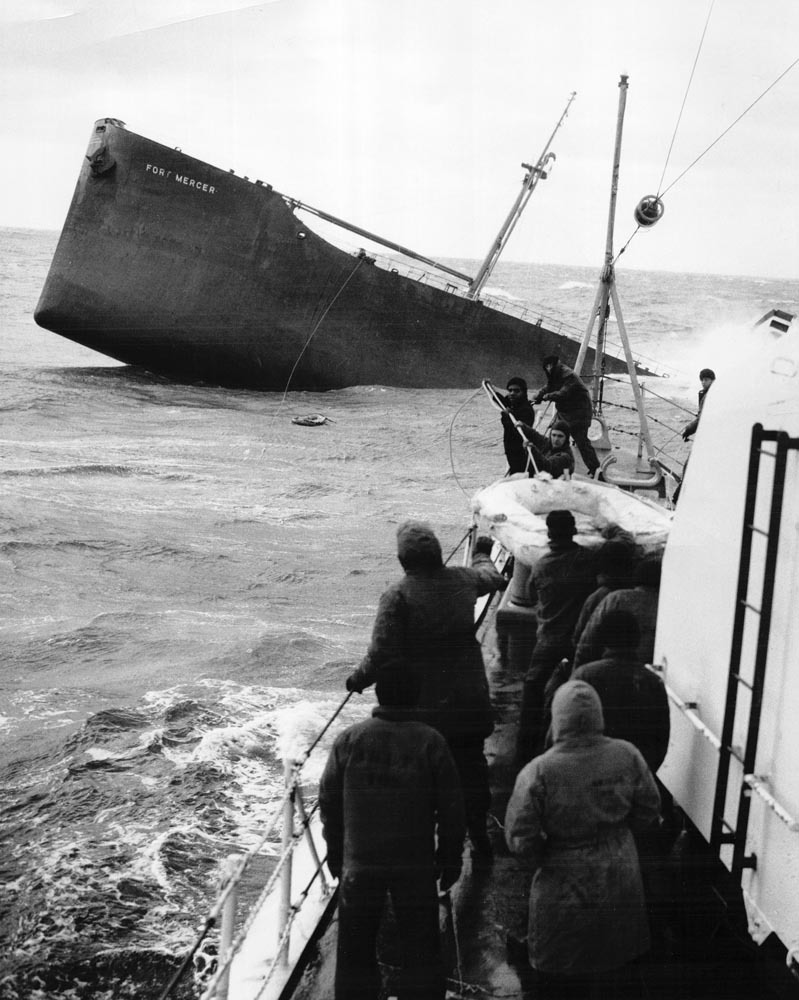
Crew from USCGC Yakutat pull in a life-raft carrying survivors from the bow section of "Fort Mercer", the photo was taken 20 minutes prior to its sinking

- Fort Mercer – Built in 1945 by Sun Shipbuilding & Drydock Co., Chester for the United States War Shipping Administration, Philadelphia. To Trinidad Corporation, Wilmington in 1946. Broke in two in the Atlantic Ocean 30 nautical miles (56 km) off Chatham, Massachusetts on 18 February 1952 with the loss of four of her crew. Bow section sunk by the United States Coast Guard. Stern section rebuilt with new bow, now 11,257 GRT and named San Jacinto. Exploded and broke in two off the coast of Virginia on 26 March 1964. Both sections salvaged. Bow section joined to stern of Mission San Carlos to form Seatrain Maryland. New bow section added to stern section to form Pasadena, now 14,844 GRT. Scrapped at Chittagong in 1985.
- Fort Mifflin – Built in 1945 by Sun Shipbuilding & Drydock Co., Chester for the United States War Shipping Administration, Philadelphia. To Gulf Oil Corporation, Philadelphia in 1946, renamed Gulfmoon in 1947. To Sea-Land Service Inc, Wilmington in 1961, renamed Ridgewood. Laid up in 1961, scrapped at Santander, Spain in 1969.
- Fort Mims – Built in 1945 by Alabama Drydock and Shipbuilding Company, Mobile for the United States War Shipping Administration, Mobile. To California Oil Company, Wilmington in 1947 then California Tanker Co, Wilmington in 1952. To Standard Oil Company of California, San Francisco in 1962, renamed Arizona Standard. Collided with Oregon Standard at San Francisco on 18 January 1971. Rebuilt with bow from Arizona Standard. Scrapped at Kaohsiung in 1973.
- Fort Moultrie – Built in 1943 by Kaiser Company, Portland for the United States War Shipping Administration, Portland. To Paragon Oil Company, New York in 1948. To Caribbean Transport S.A., Monrovia in 1956, renamed Huntington. To Texaco (Panama) Inc, Monrovia in 1960 then J. C. Berkwit & Co, Monrovia in 1961. To Equipos Marinos S.A., Maracaibo in 1962 then Anji Shipping Corp, Monrovia in 1963, renamed Anna Demetrios. Scrapped at Castellón de la Plana later that year.

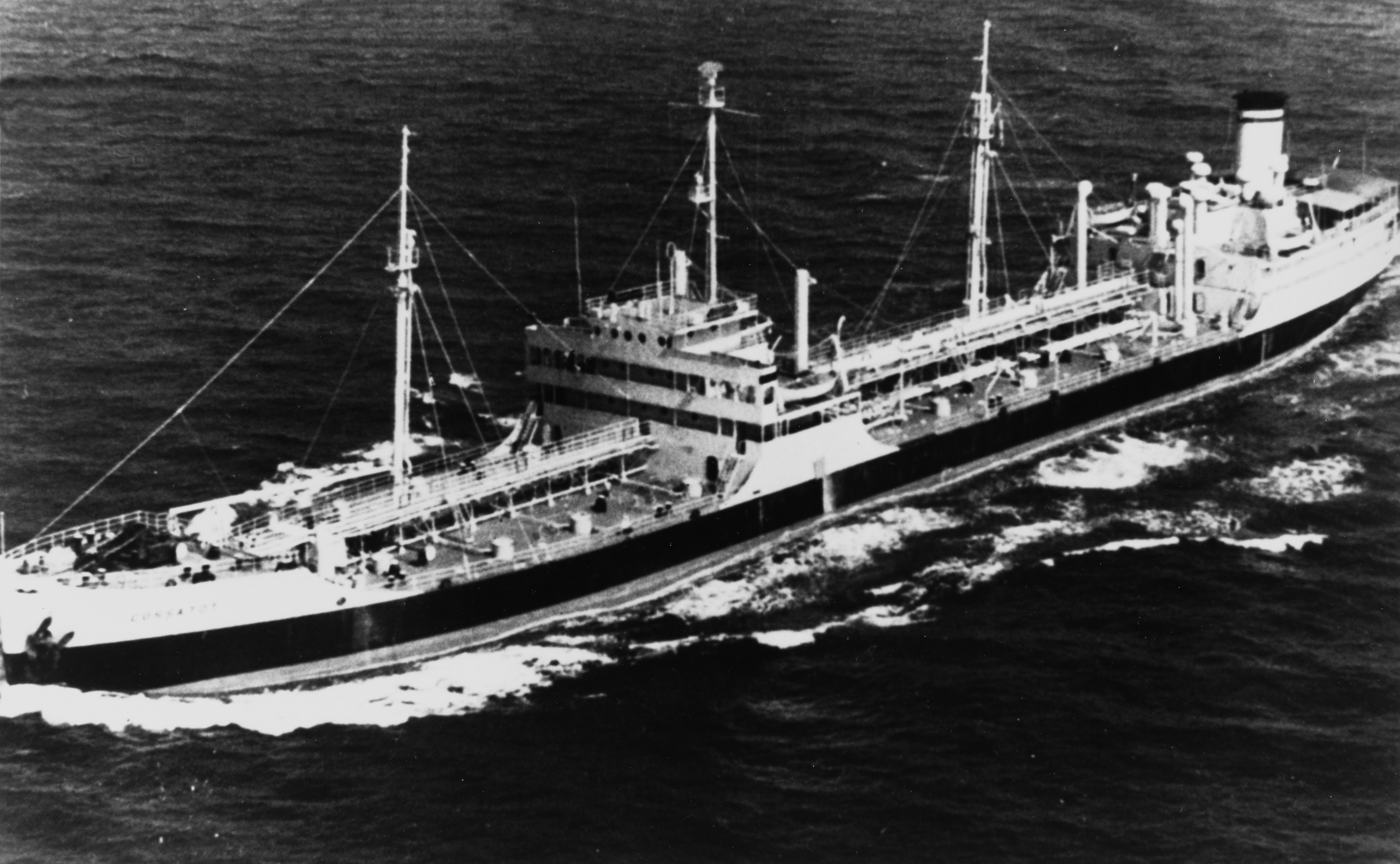
USNS Cossatot.

- Fort Necessity – Built in 1943 by Sun Shipbuilding & Drydock Co., Chester. To United States Navy as USS Cossatot (AO-77). To United States Maritime Commission in 1946 but returned to United States Navy in 1948. To Military Sea Transport Service in 1949 as USNS Cossatot (T-AO-77). Sold in 1975, subsequent fate unknown.
- Fort Niagara – Built in 1943 by Sun Shipbuilding & Drydock Co., Chester for the United States War Shipping Administration, Philadelphia. To Stratis G. Andreadis, Chios, Greece in 1948, renamed Polytimi Andreadis. Rebuilt in 1956 as a 14,425 GRT bulk carrier. Scrapped at Vilanova i la Geltrú, Spain in 1985.
- Fort Pitt – Built in 1945 by Alabama Drydock and Shipbuilding Company, Mobile for the United States War Shipping Administration, Mobile. To Pan-American Petroleum & Transport Company, Wilmington in 1946, renamed Pan-Virginia. To American Oil Company, Wilmington in 1954, renamed Amoco Virginia in 1956. To Carib Marine Co, Monrovia in 1957, renamed Carma Falcon. To American Oil Co, Monrovia in 1962 then Pan-American Overseas Oil Co, Monrovia in 1963. Scrapped at Bilbao in 1969.
- Fort Raleigh – Built in 1945 by Kaiser Company, Portland for the United States War Shipping Administration, Portland. To Anglo Saxon Petroleum Co, London in 1948, renamed Thalamus. To Shell Petroleum Co, London in 1955. To Compagnia Shell de Venezuela, Maracaibo in 1957 but returned to Shell Petroleum Co, London later that year. To Shell Tankers Ltd, London in 1960. Scrapped at Blyth in 1961.
- Fort Ridgely – Built in 1944 by Alabama Drydock and Shipbuilding Company, Mobile for the United States War Shipping Administration, Mobile. To Overseas Tankship Corp, Panama in 1947. To N.V. Nederlandsche Pacific Tankvaart Maatschappij, The Hague in 1950, renamed Caltex Leiden. Rebuilt in 1966, now 13,785 GRT. To Chevron Tankers (Nederland) N.V, The Hague in 1968, renamed Chevron Leiden. Scrapped at Kaohsiung in 1977.
- Fort Robinson – Built in 1945 by Alabama Drydock and Shipbuilding Company, Mobile for the United States War Shipping Administration, Mobile. To Standard Oil Company of New Jersey, Wilmington in 1948, renamed Esso Binghampton. To Esso Shipping Company, Wilmington in 1950. To Marine Corporation, Wilmington in 1953, renamed Marine Transoil. Scrapped at Faslane in 1965.
- Fort Schuyler – Built in 1944 by Sun Shipbuilding & Drydock Co., Chester for the United States War Shipping Administration, Philadelphia. To the Dutch Government, Rotterdam that year. To United States Maritime Commission, New York in 1946. To Gulf Oil Corporation, Philadelphia in 1947, renamed Gulfscout. To Delships Inc, Wilmington in 1966. Rebuilt to 12,775 GRT. Capsized off Morgan City, Louisiana on 24 October 1966. Subsequently, towed out to sea and sunk.
- Fort Stanwick – Built in 1942 by Sun Shipbuilding & Drydock Co., Chester for Standard Oil Company of New Jersey, Wilmington. To Esso Shipping Company, Wilmington in 1950, renamed Esso Wilmington. To Denton Steamship Corporation, New York in 1959, renamed Wang Juror then Denton later that year. To Meridian Trading Corporation, New York in 1960, renamed Margaret M.. Scrapped at Kaohsiung in 1961.
- Fort Stanwix – Built in 1945 by Kaiser Company, Portland for the United States War Shipping Administration, Portland. To Overseas Tankship Corp, Panama in 1947. Renamed Caltex Istanbul in 1952. To Outremer de Navigation Petroliere S.A. Française, Bordeaux, France in 1956, renamed Caltex Nantes. To Rio Palmera Compagnia Navigazione S.A., Panama in 1961, renamed Electra. Rebuilt in 1962 as 14,418 GRT bulk carrier. To P. S. Li (Holdings) & Co, Monrovia in 1967 and renamed Victoria Pride then Grand Pride. To Apollo (Liberia) Ltd, Monrovia in 1973. Scrapped at Kaohsiung in 1977.
- Fort Stephenson – Built in 1943 by Kaiser Company, Portland for the United States War Shipping Administration, Portland. To Paragon Oil Company, New York in 1948. To Caribbean Transport S.A., Monrovia in 1956, renamed Westbury. To Texaco (Panama) Ltd, Monrovia in 1960 then J. C. Berkwit & Co, Monrovia in 1961. Scrapped at Osaka in 1962.
- Fort Stevens – Built in 1945 by Alabama Drydock and Shipbuilding Company, Mobile for the United States War Shipping Administration, Mobile. To British Tanker Co, London in 1947. To BP Tanker Co, London in 1956. Scrapped at Blyth in 1962.
- Fort Sumter – Built in 1943 by Kaiser Company, Portland for the United States War Shipping Administration, Portland. Broke in two and sank in the Pacific Ocean 720 nautical miles (1,330 km) south of Attu Island, Alaska on 10 May 1942.
- Fort Washington – Built in 1943 by Kaiser Company, Portland for the United States War Shipping Administration, Portland. To Continental Oil Company in 1948, renamed Conoco Denver. To Globe Tankers Inc, Wilmington in 1956, renamed Hunters Point. To Texaco Inc, Wilmington in 1961, rebuilt to 14,251 GRT and renamed Texaco Nebraska. To Sea Lord Shipping Co, Wilmington in 1972, renamed Sea Lord. To Navegacion Nevgas S.A., Panama in 1973. Scrapped at Hualien City, Taiwan in 1974.
- Fort William – Built in 1944 by Kaiser Company, Portland for the United States War Shipping Administration, Portland. To Gulf Oil Corporation, Philadelphia in 1948, renamed Gulfwell. To Blackships Inc, Wilmington in 1957, rebuilt to 12,565 GRT and renamed Gulfpanther. To Afran Transport Co, Monrovia in 1972, renamed Sao Tome. Scrapped at Santander in 1975.
- Fort Winnebago – Built in 1944 by Kaiser Company, Portland for the United States War Shipping Administration, Portland. To British Oil Shipping Co, London in 1947, renamed Francine Clore. To Fratelli d'Amico, Rome, Italy in 1952, renamed Elisabetta D. Scrapped at Genoa in 1963.
- Fort Wood – Built in 1944 by Kaiser Company, Portland for the United States War Shipping Administration, Portland. To the French Government in 1948, renamed Zanguezoir. To Les Petroles d'Outre-Mer, Le Havre in 1955. To Intercontinental Navigation Corp. & Transocean Freighters Corp, Monrovia in 1956, rebuilt as 13,966 GRT bulk carrier and renamed Southern Eagle. Scrapped at Split in 1979.
- Four Lakes – Built in 1945 by Alabama Drydock and Shipbuilding Company, Mobile for the United States War Shipping Administration, Mobile. To Tanker Four Lakes Inc, Wilmington in 1948. Rebuilt in 1959 to 12,569 GRT. Exploded and sank 60 nautical miles (110 km) south of Galveston, Texas on 1 February 1972 with the loss of all hands.
- Fredericksburg – Built in 1943 by Sun Shipbuilding & Drydock Co., Chester for Paco Tankers Inc, Wilmington. To Theatre Navigation Corp, Monrovia in 1958, renamed Palace. Scrapped at Bilbao in 1965.
- French Creek – Built in 1943 by Sun Shipbuilding & Drydock Co., Chester for Cities Service Oil Corporation, New York. To United States Department of Commerce, New York in 1956 then to United States Navy as USNS French Creek (T-AO-159). To United States Department of Commerce, New York in 1957. To United States Army in 1966, used as floating power plant in Vietnam. Scrapped at Kaohsiung in 1971.
- Frenchtown – Built in 1944 by Sun Shipbuilding & Drydock Co., Chester for the United States War Shipping Administration, Philadelphia. To Standard Oil Company of New Jersey, Wilmington in 1946, renamed Esso Elizabeth. To Imperial Oil Shipping Co, Halifax in 1948, renamed Imperial Fredericton. To Vespuccio Cia. Armadora S.A, Monrovia in 1954, renamed Geo G. Rebuilt in 1961 as 12,646 GRT bulk carrier, renamed Invicta. Renamed Holy Trinity in 1973. Scrapped at La Spezia in 1978.
- Front Royal – Built in 1943 by Sun Shipbuilding & Drydock Co., Chester for the United States War Shipping Administration, Philadelphia. To Standard Oil Company of New Jersey, Wilmington in 1948, renamed Esso Shreveport. To Esso Shipping Company, Wilmington in 1950. To Humble Oil & Refining Company, Wilmington in 1960. To Commodity Transportation Corp, Wilmington in 1962, renamed Trustco. Rebuilt in 1966, bow section joined to stern of Santa Helena, that ship scrapped. Bow section of Santa Helena joined to stern section to form 17,614 GRT Observer for Marine Carriers Corporation, New York. Abandoned in Lake Timsah on 5 June 1967 due to the Suez Crisis. Laid up at Port Said, Egypt in 1975. Used as floating grain storage at Port Said from 1977, sold for scrapping in 1996.
- Fruitvale Hills – Built in 1944 by Marinship, Sausalito, California for the United States War Shipping Administration, San Francisco. To Trinidad Corporation, Wilmington in 1947. Rebuilt to 14,831 GRT in 1965, renamed San Antonio. Renamed Bordeaux in 1981. Scrapped at Brownsville in 1984.
- Fullerton Hills – Built in 1944 by Marinship, Sausalito, California for the United States War Shipping Administration, San Francisco. To Bernuth, Lembcke Co, Wilmington in 1948. Scrapped at Kaohsiung in 1962.

== G ==
- Gaines Mill – Built in 1943 by Sun Shipbuilding & Drydock Co., Chester, Pennsylvania for Charles Kurz & Co., Inc, Wilmington, Delaware. Capsized on 25 July 1977 at Kaohsiung, Taiwan. Wreck subsequently scrapped.
- Gervais – Built in 1943 by Kaiser Company, Portland, Oregon for the United States War Shipping Administration, Portland. To American Overseas Tanker Corporation, Panama in 1948. To World Theme Corp, Monrovia, Liberia in 1956, renamed World Theme. To Apollo Shipping Corp, Monrovia in 1961. Rebuilt as 14,304 GRT bulk carrier in 1962, renamed World Marine. To Nauta Corp, Monrovia in 1965, renamed Neddy. To Omnium Transportation Co, Monrovia in 1973, renamed Omnium Mariner. Scrapped at Gandia, Spain in 1978.
- Glacier Park – Built in 1944 by Kaiser Company, Portland for the United States War Shipping Administration, Portland. To Standard Vacuum Oil Company, Wilmington in 1948 and renamed Stanvac Durban. Reflagged to Panama in 1955. To Esso Standard Eastern Inc, Panama in 1962, renamed Esso Chittagong. To Amalgamated Marine Transport, Monrovia in 1965, renamed Santa Helena. Rebuilt with bow section from Wapello, now 17,863 GRT and renamed Wapello. Rebuilt in 1966, with bow section of Trustco joined to stern section. Renamed Grace and scrapped at Vinaròs, Spain in 1967.
- Glenn's Ferry – Built in 1945 by Kaiser Company, Portland for the United States War Shipping Administration, Portland. Ran aground on Batag Island, Philippines on 6 October 1945. The ship exploded and was burnt out.
- Glorieta – Built in 1944 by Sun Shipbuilding Co, Chester for the United States War Shipping Administration, Philadelphia, Pennsylvania. To Tidewater Associated Oil Company, Wilmington in 1947, renamed Byron D. Benson. To Getty Oil Company, Wilmington in 1967. Rebuilt in 1968 to 13,659 GRT, renamed Louisiana Getty. To Coastal Hercules Inc, Houston, Texas in 1983, renamed Coastal Florida. Scrapped at San Esteban de Pravia, Spain in 1984.
- Gold Creek – Built in 1945 by Alabama Drydock and Shipbuilding Company, Mobile, Alabama for the United States War Shipping Administration, Mobile. Ran aground off Martha's Vineyard, Massachusetts on 25 June 1946 and was severely damaged. Sold to National Bulk Carriers Inc, Wilmington. Rebuilt in 1947, now 9,147 GRT, renamed Pan Georgia. Exploded and burnt out at Wilmington on 23 July 1953. Laid up at Baltimore, Maryland. To Universe Tankships Inc, Monrovia in 1955. Rebuilt as a dredger, now 6,663 GRT and renamed Sealane. To Continental Dredging Co, Monrovia in 1963. To Green Diamond Enterprises, Panama in 1981, renamed Asialane. Scrapped in 1983.
- Golden Hill – Built in 1945 by Alabama Drydock and Shipbuilding Company, Mobile for the United States War Shipping Administration, Mobile. To Gulf Oil Corporation, Philadelphia in 1947, renamed Gulfpeak in 1948. To Seatrade Corporation, New York in 1960, renamed Montauk Point. Rebuilt as 15,062 GRT bulk carrier in 1962, renamed Westhampton. To Marine Traders Inc, New York in 1963, renamed Granopolis the Peary later that year. To Penn Navigation Company, New York in 1970, renamed Penn Leader. To Honorable Carriers Inc, Panama in 1974, renamed Lorana. Scrapped at Kaohsiung in 1977.
- Government Camp – Built in 1945 by Kaiser Company, Portland for the United States War Shipping Administration, Portland. To Cities Service Oil Corporation, New York in 1947. To Tramp Shipping & Oil Transportation Corporation, New York in 1958, renamed Captain Nicholas Sitinas. Rebuilt as 15,947 GRT bulk carrier in 1962, renamed Bridgehampton. Arrested at Port Said on 23 February 1963 and laid up. To The Platte Transport Corporation, New York in 1965, renamed Platte. To Ogden Platte Transport Inc, Panama in 1968. Scrapped at Cartagena, Spain in 1976.
- Grand Mesa – Built in 1945 by Kaiser Company, Portland for the United States War Shipping Administration, Portland. To Standard Vacuum Oil Company, Wilmington in 1984, renamed Stanvac Singapore. Reflagged to Panama in 1955. To Esso Standard Eastern Inc, Panama in 1962, renamed Esso Singapore. Scrapped at Hong Kong in 1965.
- Grand River – Built in 1944 by Alabama Drydock and Shipbuilding Company, Mobile for the United States War Shipping Administration, Mobile. To Overseas Tankship Corp, Panama in 1947. To N.V. Nederlandsche Pacific Tankvaart Maatschappij, The Hague, Netherlands in 1950, renamed Caltex Delft. Scrapped at Nagasaki, Japan in 1965.
- Grand Teton – Built in 1944 by Kaiser Company, Portland for the United States War Shipping Administration, Portland. To the French Government in 1948, renamed Purfina. Renamed Purfina France in 1951 and Purfina Portugal in 1957. To Société Anonyme Purfina Transports, Dunkerque in 1959, renamed Fina Portugal in 1960. To Kerdos Shipping Corp, Monrovia in 1964, renamed Kerdos then Arno later that year. Scrapped at Bilbao, Spain in 1967.
- Grande Ronde – Built in 1943 by Kaiser Company, Portland for the United States War Shipping Administration, Portland. To Cephalonian Maritime Co, Piraeus, Greece in 1948, renamed Kate N. L.. To Leitch Transport Ltd, Toronto, Ontario, Canada in 1960, renamed Hilda Marjanne. Rebuilt in 1961 as 16,628 GRT bulk carrier. To Upper Lakes Transport, Toronto in 1977. Scrapped in 1984, bow section joined to Chino to form Canadian Ranger.
- Grants Pass – Built in 1945 by Kaiser Company, Portland for the United States War Shipping Administration, Portland. To Lanmore Co. Inc, Panama in 1947 then Grant's Pass Corp, Panama in 1948. To Panama Transport Corp, Panama in 1956, renamed Esso Ponce. To Alta Shipping Corp, Panama in 1959, rebuilt at 12,816 GRT bulk carrier and renamed Rion. Renamed Drepanon in 1961. To Trans-Pacific Shipping Co, Panama in 1968, renamed Pactrader. To Honeywell Navigation Corp, Panama in 1975, renamed Shirley. Scrapped at Kaohsiung in 1979.
- Grays Harbor – Built in 1945 by Kaiser Company, Portland for the United States War Shipping Administration, Portland. To Overseas Tankship Corp, Panama in 1947, renamed Caltex Rhodesia in 1952. To Tokyo Tankship K.K., Tokyo, Japan in 1961, renamed Rhodesia Maru. To Morita Rinkai Kogyo K.K., Ichinomiya in 1964, converted to dredger and renamed Shunyo Maru No. 2. Scrapped at Kaohsiung in 1970.
- Great Meadows – Built in 1943 by Sun Shipbuilding Co, Chester for the United States War Shipping Administration, Philadelphia. To Gulf Oil Corporation, Philadelphia in 1947, renamed Gulfmeadows in 1948. To Blackships Inc, Wilmington in 1957, rebuilt to 12,811 GRT and renamed Gulfbeaver. To Afran Transport Co, Monrovia in 1971, renamed Las Piedras. Scrapped at San Esteban de Pravia in 1975.
- Groveton – Built in 1943 by Sun Shipbuilding Co, Chester for the United States War Shipping Administration, Philadelphia. To Tide Water Associated Oil Company, Wilmington in 1947, renamed David McKelvey. To Clearwater Shipping Inc, New York in 1962, renamed Midland. To York Agents Inc, New York in 1966, renamed Midlake. Rebuilt in 1967 with bow section of Isara, now 19,513 GRT. To Navegacion Nevgas, Panama in 1970 then Navegacion Benita S.A., Panama in 1974 and renamed Benita. Scrapped at Borriana, Spain in 1976.
- Guilford (T2 design) – Built in 1943 by Sun Shipbuilding & Drydock Co., Chester, Pennsylvania for the Socony-Vacuum Oil Company, New York, renamed Colina shortly after launching. To Socony Mobil Oil Company, New York in 1955 and Mobil Oil Corporation, New York in 1965. Scrapped at Castellón de la Plana, Spain in 1971.

== H ==
- Hadley – Built in 1943 by Kaiser Company, Portland, Oregon for the United States War Shipping Administration, Portlan. To Alpha South Africa Steamship Co, Durban, South Africa, renamed Alpha Limpopo, then to Yacimientos Petroliferos Fiscales, Buenos Aires, Argentina later that year and renamed San Julian. Scrapped in Argentina in 1978.
- Halls Of Montezuma – Built in 1945 by Kaiser Company, Portland for the United States War Shipping Administration, Portland. To Esso Transportation Co, London, United Kingdom in 1947, renamed Esso Cardiff. To Lorca Compagnia Navigation, Monrovia, Liberia in 1955. Rebuilt as a 11,564 GRT bulk carrier, renamed Aquitanius, renamed Andros Neptune in 1956. To Vicalvaro Compagnia Navigazione, Piraeus, Greece in 1960, renamed Skopelos then to Compagnia Navigazione Patagonia, Piraeus later that year and renamed Transwarren. To Transeastern Associates Inc, New York in 1961. To Sea Transport Inc, New York in 1962, renamed Niagara. Scrapped at Castellón de la Plana, Spain in 1965.
- Hammerfest – Built in 1945 by Sun Shipbuilding & Drydock Co., Chester, Pennsylvania for the Norwegian Government, Oslo. To Johs Hansens Rederi A/S, Oslo in 1946. To A/S Kristiansands Tankrederi, Oslo in 1949, renamed Polyglory. To International Union Lines, Monrovia in 1960, renamed Union Glory. Rebuilt in 1961 as a 13,599 GRT bulk carrier. Scrapped at Kaohsiung, Taiwan in 1978.
- Hanging Rock – Built in 1944 by Sun Shipbuilding & Drydock Co, Chester for the United States War Shipping Administration, Philadelphia, Pennsylvania. To Tanker Sag Harbor Corporation, Wilmington, Delaware in 1946, renamed Petrolite. To United States Department of Commerce in 1956 then to Military Sea Transportation Service as USNS Petrolite (T-AO-164). To Sea Land Service Inc, New York in 1969 and rebuilt. Bow section to Oregon Standard, replaced by bow section of Seattle to form 11,499 GRT container ship, renamed Seattle. To Litton Industries Leasing Corporation, Wilmington in 1973 then Reynolds Leasing Corporation, Wilmington in 1975. Scrapped at Gijón in 1978.

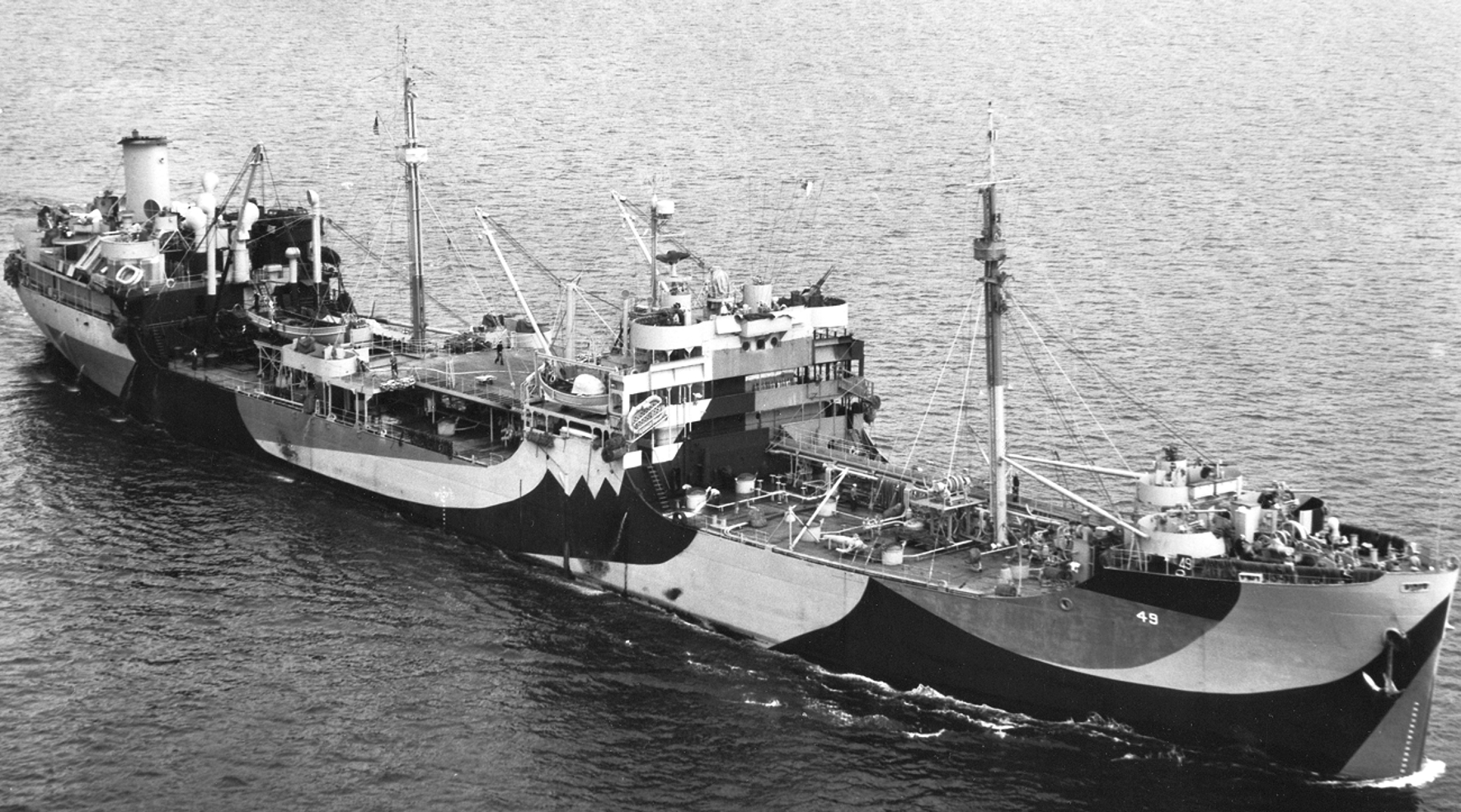
USS Suamico.

- Harlem Heights – Built in 1941 by Sun Shipbuilding & Drydock Co, Chester. To United States Navy, commissioned at USS Suamico (AO-49). To United States Maritime Commission in 1946. To Military Sea Transportation Service in 1948 as USNS Suamico (T-AO-49). Scrapped at Yokohama, Japan in 1975.
- Harpers Ferry – Built in 1944 by Sun Shipbuilding & Drydock Co, Chester for the United States War Shipping Administration, Philadelphia. To North American Shipping and Trading Company, New York in 1947, renamed Seven Seas. To United States Department of Commerce in 1956. To American Trading & Production Corporation, Baltimore, Maryland in 1957, renamed Virginia Trader. Rebuilt in 1966, incorporating midsection from Mission de Pala. To American Trading Transportation Co, New York in 1972. Scrapped at Borriana, Spain in 1975.

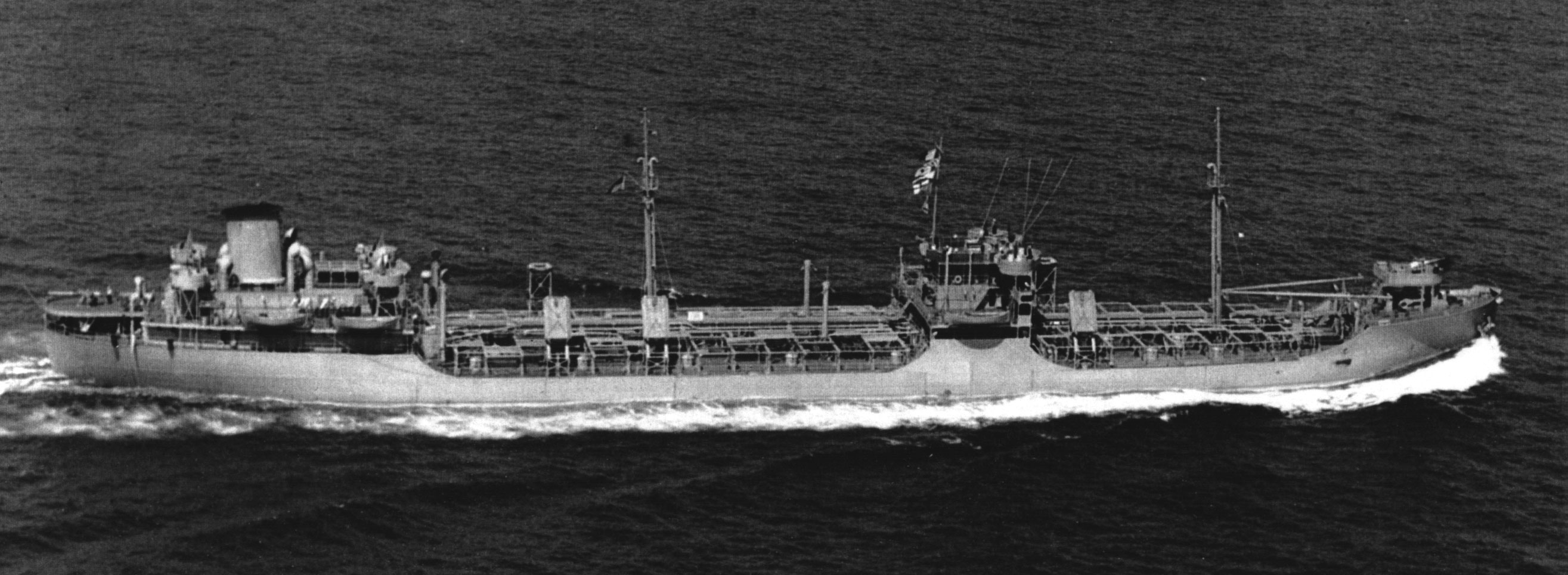
Hat Creek.

- Hat Creek – Built in 1943 by Alabama Drydock and Shipbuilding Company, Mobile, Alabama for the United States War Shipping Administration, Mobile. To National Bulk Carriers Inc, Wilmington in 1947. To American Tankers Corporation of Delaware, Wilmington in 1951. To American Oil Company, Baltimore in 1956. Rebuilt in 1957, now 12,532 GRT and renamed Amoco Virginia. To Amoco Shipping Company, New York in 1970. To Point Enterprise Corporation, Wilmington in 1978, renamed Point Judy. Renamed Point Milton in 1981. Scrapped at Kearney, New Jersey in 1983.
- H. D. Collier – Built in 1945 by Sun Shipbuilding & Drydock Co, Chester for Standard Oil of California, San Francisco, California. Scrapped at Kaohsiung in 1974.
- Hegra – Built in 1945 by Sun Shipbuilding & Drydock Co, Chester for the Norwegian Government. To A/S Krogstads Shipping Agencies, Oslo in 1946, renamed Nidar. To Smedvigs Tankrederi A/S, Oslo in 1948, renamed Veni. To Pacifico Ocean Marina Corp, Panama in 1959, renamed Pacific Leader. To Pacific Union Marine Corp, Monrovia in 1962, rebuilt as 14,238 GRT bulk carrier. Renamed Oceanic Amity in 1968. Scrapped at Kaohsiung in 1978.
- Heron's Bridge – Built in 1944 by Sun Shipbuilding & Drydock Co, Chester for the United States War Shipping Administration, Philadelphia. To Lanmore Inc, Panama in 1947 then Panama Transport Co, Panama in 1948, renamed Esso Brazil. Rebuilt in 1954 to liquid petroleum gas carrier, now 11,008 GRT. To Petromar Compagnia de Navegazion, Buenos Aires in 1961, renamed Petromar Bahia Blanca. Scrapped at Santander, Spain in 1967.
- Hobkirk's Hill – Built in 1942 by Sun Shipbuilding & Drydock Co., Chester, Pennsylvania for the Socony-Vacuum Oil Company, New York. Renamed Conestoga later that year. To Hess Inc, Perth Amboy, New Jersey in 1953 and renamed Hess Fuel. Rebuilt in 1954, now 11,621 GRT. To Hess Tankship Company, Wilmington in 1955. To Timbo Shipping Ltd, Monrovia in 1963. Rebuilt, now 15,744 GRT and renamed Sasstown. Scrapped at Alang, India in 1993.
- Hobkirk's Hill – Built in 1944 by Sun Shipbuilding & Drydock Co, Chester for the United States War Shipping Administration, Philadelphia. To N.V. Petroleum Industrie Maatschappij, The Hague, Netherlands in 1946, renamed Esso Den Haag. To Esso Tankvaart Maatschappij, N.V., The Hague in 1958 then Sealanes Shipping Co, Piraeus in 1959, renamed Frixos. Rebuilt as 15,020 GRT bulk carrier in 1960, reflagged to Liberia in 1965. To Outerocean Navigation Corp, Kaohsiung in 1970, renamed Shelley. Scrapped at Kaohsiung in 1977.
- Homestead – Built in 1945 by Kaiser Company, Portland for the United States War Shipping Administration, Portland. Struck by lightning at Jacksonville, Florida on 5 August 1946 and burnt out. Scrapped in 1947.
- Honey Hill – Built in 1945 by Sun Shipbuilding & Drydock Co, Chester for the United States War Shipping Administration, Philadelphia. To Atlantic Refining Company in 1946, renamed Atlantic Dealer. To Skar-Ore Steamship Corporation, Wilmington in 1960. Rebuilt in 1961 as 12,626 GRT bulk carrier, renamed Paul H. Carnahan. Scrapped at Kaohsiung in 1986.
- Honningsvaag – Built in 1945 by Alabama Drydock and Shipbuilding Company, Mobile for the Norwegian Government. To Tonnevolds Tankrederi A/S, Grimstad in 1946, renamed Thorunn. To Olga Konow, New York in 1961. Rebuilt as 15,147 GRT bulk carrier, renamed Saint Christopher. To Intercontinental Transportation Company, New York in 1964, renamed Globe Traveler. To Ocean Clippers Inc, New York in 1967, renamed Overseas Traveler in 1968. To Ogden Traveler Transport Inc, New York in 1978, renamed Traveler. Scrapped at Alang in 1983.
- Hood River – Built in 1945 by Kaiser Company, Portland for the United States War Shipping Administration, Portland. To Overseas Tankship Corp, Panama in 1946. Renamed Caltex Cape Town in 1952. Scrapped at Kaohsiung in 1967.
- Horseshoe – Built in 1945 by Alabama Drydock and Shipbuilding Company, Mobile for the United States War Shipping Administration, Mobile. To Anglo Saxon Petroleum Co, London in 1947, renamed Tenagodus. To Shell Petroleum Co, London in 1955 then Shell Tankers Ltd, London in 1960. Scrapped at Inverkeithing, Fife in 1962.
- Hovenweep – Built in 194e by Kaiser Company, Portland for the United States War Shipping Administration, Portland. To Northern Petroleum Tank Steamship Company, Newcastle in 1947, renamed Oilfield. To Intercontinental Navigation Corp & Transocean Freighters Corp, Monrovia in 1959, renamed Northern Eagle. Rebuilt as 14,800 GRT bulk carrier in 1962. Scrapped at Split, Yugoslavia in 1978.
- Hubbardton – Built in 1944 by Sun Shipbuilding & Drydock Co, Chester for the United States War Shipping Administration, Philadelphia. To The Texas Company, Wilmington in 1947, renamed Alabama in 1948. Renamed Texaco Alabama in 1960. To Texaco Panama Inc, Panama in 1962, rebuilt to 14,412 GRT and renamed Texaco Bristol. Scrapped at San Esteban de Pravia, Spain in 1976.
- Huntington Hill – Built in 1945 by Marinship, Sausalito, California for the United States War Shipping Administration, San Francisco. To State Fuel Corporation, Boston, Massachusetts in 1948, renamed W. E. Downing. To Hess Inc, Perth Amboy in 1953, renamed Hess Diesel. Rebuilt to 11,545 GRT in 1954. To Hess Tankship Company, Wilmington in 1955. Rebuilt to 14,035 GRT in 1961. To Commerce Tankers Corporation, Wilmington in 1966, renamed Thalia. To Tanker Four Lakes Inc, Wilmington in 1971, renamed William J. Fields then to Syracuse Corporation, Wilmington later that year. To Cove Tankers Corporation, New York in 1975, renamed Mount Explorer. To Cove Carriers Inc, New York in 1978, renamed Cove Explorer. Scrapped at Gadani Beach, Pakistan in 1983.

== I ==
- Idaho Falls – Built in 1944 by Kaiser Company, Portland, Oregon for the United States War Shipping Administration, Portland. To Standard Oil Company of California, San Francisco, California in 1948. Renamed Idaho Standard in 1957. Scrapped at Kaohsiung, Taiwan in 1977.
- Inglewood Hills – Built in 1944 by Marinship, Sausalito, California for the United States War Shipping Administration, San Francisco. To N.V. Phs van Ommeren, Rotterdam, Netherlands in 1948, renamed Wieldrecht. To N.V Maatschappij, m.s. Wieldrecht (van Ommeren), Rotterdam in 1953. Scrapped at Trieste, Italy in 1962.

== J ==
- Jacksonville – Built in 1944 by Kaiser Company, Portland, Oregon for the United States War Shipping Administration, Portland. Torpedoed and sunk in the Atlantic Ocean by U-482 on 20 August 1944.
- Jalapa – Built in 1943 by Sun Shipbuilding & Drydock Co., Chester, Pennsylvania for Gulf Oil Corporation, Philadelphia, Pennsylvania. Renamed Gulflight in 1947. To Sea-Land Service Inc, Wilmington, Delaware in 1961, renamed Summit. To Beauregard Inc, Wilmington in 1963, rebuilt as 8,903 GRT container ship. To Litton Industries Leasing Corporation, Wilmington in 1964. To Reynolds Leasing Corporation, Wilmington in 1975. Scrapped at Busan, South Korea in 1976.
- James Island Built in 1944 by Sun Shipbuilding & Drydock Co, Chester for the United States War Shipping Administration, Philadelphia. To J. M. Carras Inc, Wilmington in 1948, renamed Alexandra. To Phenix Petroleum Shipping Inc, Monrovia, Liberia in 1955, renamed Amanda. To Phenix Steamship Corp, Monrovia in 1961, renamed Lyra. To Seatrade Corporation, New York in 1962, rebuilt as 15,995 GRT bulk carrier, renamed Easthampton. To Merrimac Transport Inc, New York in 1964, renamed Merrimac. To Ogden Merrimac Transport Inc, New York in 1969. Scrapped at Chittagong, India in 1982.
- J. H. Macgaregill – Built in 1945 by Sun Shipbuilding & Drydock Co, Chester for Standard Oil Company of California, San Francisco, California. Scrapped at Suao, Taiwan in 1973.
- JL Hanna – Built in 1945 by Sun Shipbuilding & Drydock Co, Chester for Standard Oil Company of California, San Francisco. Scrapped at Kaohsiung, Taiwan in 1977.
- Jordan Valley – Built in 1945 by Kaiser Company, Portland for the United States War Shipping Administration, Portland. To Standard Oil Company of California, San Francisco in 1948, renamed Lompoc. To Western Ocean Transport Co, Wilmington in 1956. To Security Pacific National Bank in 1966. To Union Oil Company of California, Los Angeles, California in 1974. Converted to barge in 1985.

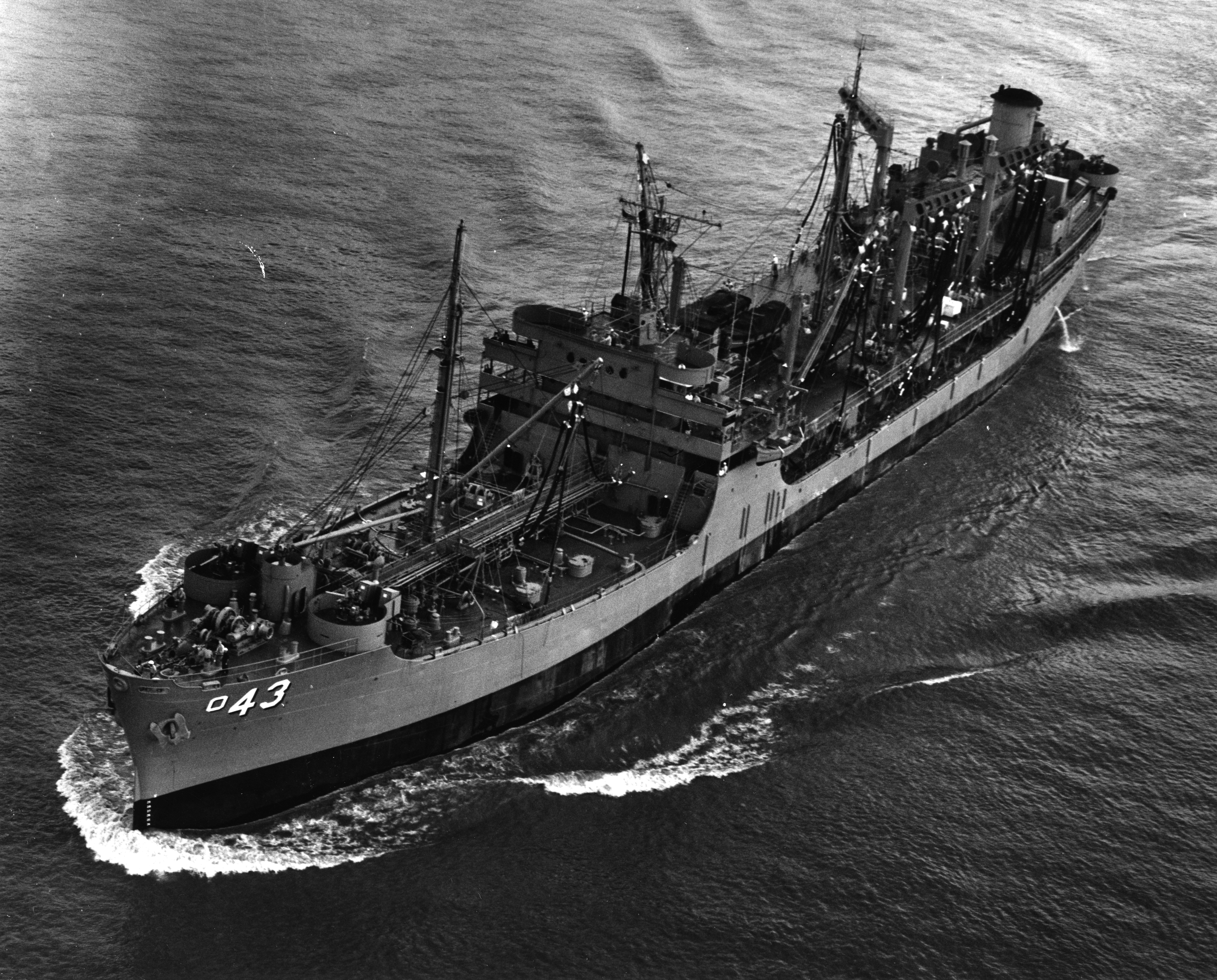
USS Tappahannock.

- Jorkay (T2-A design) – Built in 1943 by Sun Shipbuilding & Drydock Co., Chester. To United States Navy as USS Tappahannock (AO-43). Decommissioned in 1970, scrapped in 1987.
- Joshua Tree – Built in 1944 by Kaiser Company, Portland for the United States War Shipping Administration, Portland. To National Bulk Carriers Inc, Wilmington in 1947. To American Tankers Corporation of Delaware, Wilmington in 1951. To National Bulk Carriers Inc, Wilmington in 1957. Scrapped at Hirao, Japan in 1963.
- Julesburg – Built in 1943 by Alabama Drydock and Shipbuilding Company, Mobile, Alabama for the United States War Shipping Administration, Mobile. To Terminal Tanker Industries, Wilmington in 1948. To Charles Kurz & Co., Inc, Wilmington in 1955. Rebuilt in 1959, now 12,638 GRT. Scrapped at Brownsville, Texas in 1976.

== K ==
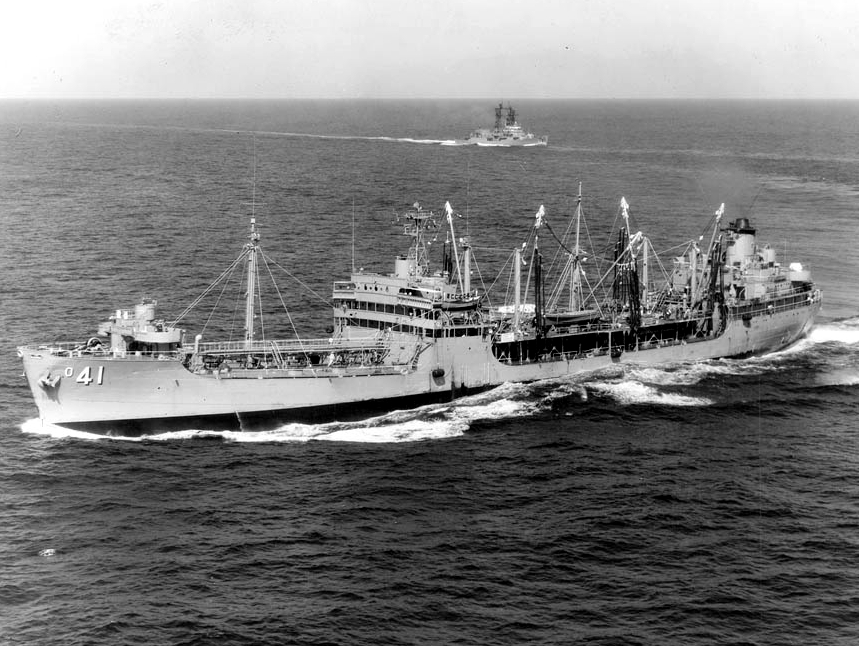
USS Mattaponi.

- Kalkay (T2-A design) – Built in 1942 by Sun Shipbuilding & Drydock Co., Chester, Pennsylvania. To United States Navy as USS Mattaponi (AO-41). Decommissioned in 1970, scrapped at New York in 1973.
- Kaposia – Built in 1945 by Alabama Drydock and Shipbuilding Company, Mobile, Alabama for the United States War Shipping Administration, Mobile. To National Bulk Carriers Inc, Wilmington, Delaware in 1948. To American Tanker Corporation of Delaware, Wilmington in 1951. To Sea Carriers Inc, Monrovia, Liberia in 1955. To Societa Anonyme de Navigacion Petrola, Valparaíso, Chile in 1960; rebuilt to 14,932 GRT. Scrapped at Kaohsiung, Taiwan in 1973.
- Karsten Wang – Built in 1944 by Sun Shipbuilding & Drydock Co., Chester, Pennsylvania for the Norwegian Government, Oslo. To Skibs A/S Garm, Risør in 1946. To Neptun Shipping A/S, Farsund in 1950, renamed Mosborg. To Caldel Petroleum Corp, Monrovia in 1955, renamed Formostar. Converted to floating powerplant in 1960. Scrapped at Hamburg, West Germany in 1964.
- Kathio – Built in 1945 by Alabama Drydock and Shipbuilding Company, Mobile for the United States War Shipping Administration, Mobile. To Gulf Oil Corporation in 1948, renamed Gulfkey. To Delships Inc, Wilmington in 1958, rebuilt to 12,670 GRT and renamed Gulfseal. To Point Resolute Corporation, Wilmington in 1979, renamed Point Revere. Scrapped at Gadani Beach, Pakistan in 1983.
- Kenesaw Mountain – Built in 1943 by Sun Shipbuilding & Drydock Co, Chester for the United States War Shipping Administration, Philadelphia, Pennsylvania. To Sun Oil Company, Philadelphia in 1947, renamed Ohio Sun. Scrapped at Kaohsiung in 1969.

USS Kennebago.

- Kennebago (T2-SE-A2 design) – Built in 1943 by Marinship, Sausalito, California. To the United States Navy as USS Kennebago (AO-81). To United States Maritime Commission in 1947 then Military Sea Transportation Service in 1950 as USNS Kennebago (T-AO-81). Laid up in 1959. To United States Army in 1966, used as a floating power station at Nha Trang, Vietnam until 1971.
- Kern Hills – Built in 1943 by Marinship, Sausalito for the United States War Shipping Administration, San Francisco, California. To Southeastern Oil Florida Inc, Wilmington in 1948. To Long Island Tankers Corp, Wilmington in 1956 then Fairfield Steamship Corp, New York later that year. Renamed Little Rock then Wang Dispatcher in 1957. Scrapped at Willebroek, Belgium in 1961.
- Kernstown – Built in 1944 by Sun Shipbuilding & Drydock Co, Chester for the United States War Shipping Administration, Philadelphia. To The Texas Company, Wilmington in 1947, renamed Louisiana in 1948 and Texaco Louisiana in 1960. To Cayuga Steamship Company, Wilmington in 1970, renamed Silver Jay. To Utica Maritime Shipping Co, Panama later that year, renamed Virgo. Scrapped at Gadani Beach in 1975.
- Kettle Creek – Built in 1944 by Sun Shipbuilding & Drydock Co, Chester for the United States War Shipping Administration, Philadelphia. To California Oil Company, Wilmington in 1947. To California Tanker Company, Wilmington in 1952. To Standard Oil Company of California, Wilmington in 1956, renamed Washington Standard in 1957. Scrapped at Kaohsiung in 1973.
- Kettleman Hills – Built in 1944 by Marinship, Sausalito for the United States War Shipping Administration, San Francisco. To American Overseas Tankship Corporation, Wilmington in 1948 then Oceanic Maritime Corporation, Wilmington in 1949. To Colonial Steamship Corporation, New York in 1951, renamed Sea Tiger. To Seatiger Steamship Corporation, Wilmington in 1954 then Jupiter Steamship Corporation, Wilmington in 1956. To Ocean Tankships Inc, Monrovia in 1957, renamed Ocean Nora then to Marine Star Inc, Monrovia later that year and renamed Caribbean Star. To Ocean Tankships Inc, Monrovia in 1959. To Bulk Ships Inc, New York in 1960, rebuilt as 13,795 GRT bulk carrier and renamed Globe Explorer. To Sea Liberties Inc, New York in 1963. Damaged by engine room fire on 11 September 1964. Rebuilt in 1965 with bow from Appomattox and renamed Fairwind. Bow section to Appomattox. Scrapped at Valencia, Spain in 1965.
- Kings Canyon – Built in 1945 by Kaiser Company, Portland, Oregon for the United States War Shipping Administration, Portland. To Overseas Tankship Corp, Panama in 1947. To Tokyo Tanker K.K., Tokyo, Japan in 1951, renamed Nissei Maru. To Morita Rinkai Kingyo K.K., Ichinomiya, Japan, converted to sand carrier, renamed Shunyo Maru No. 3. To Hitachi Zosen Rinkai Koji K.K., Osaka, Japan in 1968. To V. M. Sagaocar & Brother Ltd, Bombay, India in 1971, renamed Sanjeevani. Driven ashore at Mormugao, India on 5 June 1994. Scrapped in situ in 1997.
- Kittanning – Built in 1943 by Sun Shipbuilding & Drydock Co, Chester for the United States War Shipping Administration, Philadelphia. To Theatre Navigation Corp, Monrovia in 1947, renamed Lyric. Scrapped at Bilbao, Spain in 1965.
- Klamath Falls – Built in 1943 by Kaiser Company, Portland for the United States War Shipping Administration, Portland. To Markos P. Nomikos, Piraeus, Greece in 1948, renamed Petrakis Nomikos III. To Mondedo Compagnia Navigacion, Monrovia in 1955, renamed Aetolicus. Rebuilt in 1956 as 11,588 GRT bulk carrier. Renamed Andros Vega in 1957. To Marcelbro Compagnia Navigazione, Piraeus in 1960, renamed Skyros. Ran aground off To-shima, Tokyo on 30 March 1962 and severely damaged. Scrapped in Japan that year.

== L ==
- La Brea Hills – Built in 1945 by Marinship, Sausalito, California for the United States War Shipping Administration, San Francisco, California. To Trinidad Corporation, Wilmington, Delaware in 1948. Rebuilt to 15,354 GRT in 1962 and renamed Austin. Renamed Vouvray in 1982. Scrapped at Gadani Beach, Pakistan later that year.

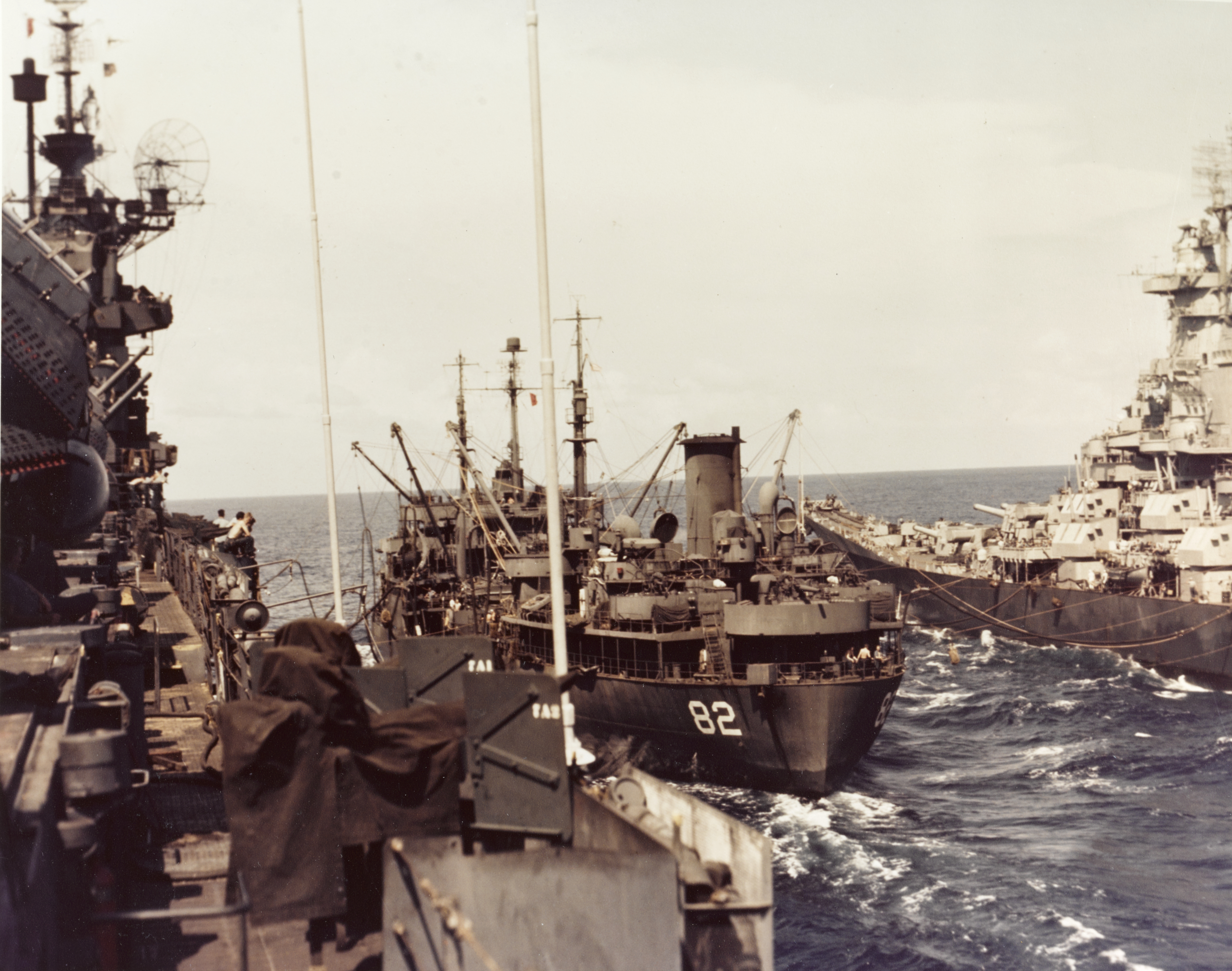
USS Cahaba.

- Lackawapen (T2-SE-A2 design) – Built in 1943 by Marinship, Sausalito. Renamed Lackawaxen before being acquired by the United States Navy. Commissioned as USS Cahaba (AO-82). To United States Maritime Commission in 1947 but returned to the United States Navy in 1948. To Military Sea Transportation Service in 1950 as USNS Cahaba (T-AO-82). To United States Maritime Commission in 1958. To United States Army in 1966, used as a floating power station for use in Vietnam. Scrapped in 1971.
- Lake Champlain – Built in 1943 by Kaiser Company, Portland, Oregon for the United States War Shipping Administration, Portland. Renamed Broad River later that year. To Società Petrolifera Esercizi Marittimi e Società Italiana Petroliere d'Oriente, Genoa, Italy in 1948, renamed Prometeo. To Omnium Transportation Co, Monrovia, Liberia in 1960, renamed Omnium Wanderer. To Ariadne Shipping Co, Monrovia in 1961, rebuilt as 11,753 GRT bulk carrier. To Omnium Transportation Co, Monrovia in 1971. Scrapped at Kaohsiung, Taiwan in 1973.
- Lake Erie – Built in 1944 by Sun Shipbuilding & Drydock Co., Chester, Pennsylvania for the United States War Shipping Administration, Philadelphia, Pennsylvania. To The Texas Company, Wilmington in 1947, renamed New Jersey. Rebuilt in 1952, now 12,261 GRT. Renamed Texaco New Jersey in 1961. Scrapped at Kaohsiung in 1984.
- Lake George – Built in 1944 by Sun Shipbuilding & Drydock Co., Chester for the United States War Shipping Administration, Philadelphia. To United States Petroleum Carriers Inc, New York in 1948. To Alexander S. Onassis Corp, Monrovia in 1957. To Condor Financiera Panama, Monrovia in 1962. Renamed Anthem in 1963. Scrapped at Kaohsiung in 1970.
- La Mesa – Built in 1944 by Sun Shipbuilding & Drydock Co. for the United States War Shipping Administration, Philadelphia. To Oriental Trade & Transport Co, London, United Kingdom in 1947, renamed Stanvac Manila. To Standard-Vacuum Transportation Co, London in 1955. Scrapped at Keelung, Taiwan in 1962.
- Laurel Hill – Built in 1944 by Kaiser Company, Portland for the United States War Shipping Administration, Portland. To Anglo-Saxon Petroleumm, London in 1947, renamed Tresus. To Eagle Oil & Shipping Co Ltd, London in 1948, renamed San Leopoldo in 1949. Scrapped at Inverkeithing, Fife, United Kingdom in 1960.
- Little Big Horn – Built in 1943 by Alabama Drydock and Shipbuilding Company, Mobile, Alabama for the United States War Shipping Administration, Mobile. To Independent Tankships Inc, Wilmington in 1948, renamed Spirit of Liberty. To Keystone Shipping Inc, Philadelphia in 1955. To Western Ocean Transport Company, Wilmington in 1964, renamed Point Sur. To Evergreen Tankers Inc, Panama in 1971, renamed Hongkong Evergreen. To Summit Service Corp, Panama in 1973, renamed Performance in 1974. Scrapped at Kaohsiung in 1975.
- Little Butte – Built in 1944 by Alabama Drydock & Shipbuilding Company, Mobil for the United States War Shipping Administration, Mobile. To North American Shipping & Trading Company, New York in 1948, renamed Mermaid. To United States Department of Commerce, New York in 1955. To Metro Petroleum Shipping Company, New York in 1957. Scrapped at Hong Kong in 1965.
- Logan's Fort – Built in 1944 by Sun Shipbuilding & Drydock Co, Chester for the United States War Shipping Commission, Philadelphia. To Cities Service Oil Company, New York in 1947. To United States Department of Commerce, New York in 1955. To Military Sea Transportation Service in 1956 as USNS Logan's Fort (T-AO-160). To United States Department of Commerce, New York in 1957. To United States Army in 1966, used at a floating power station at Cam Ranh Bay, Vietnam. Scrapped at Kaohsiung in 1972.
- Lone Jack – Built in 1944 by Sun Shipbuilding & Drydock Co, Chester for the United States War Shipping Administration, Philadelphia. To Cities Service Oil Company, New York in 1947. To United States Department of Commerce, New York in 1955 then Military Sea Transportation Service in 1956, commissioned as USNS Lone Jack (T-AO-161). To United States Department of Commerce, New York in 1957. To United States Army in 1966, used as a floating power station in Vietnam. Scrapped at Kaohsiung in 1971.
- Lookout Mountain – Built in 1943 by Sun Shipbuilding & Drydock Co, Chester for the United States War Shipping Administration, Philadelphia. To American Pacific Steamship Company, Los Angeles, California in 1948, renamed Ampac California. To Tanoan Corp, Monrovia in 1955, renamed Tanoan. To World Tolerance Group, Monrovia in 1956, renamed World Tolerance. To Artemis Shipping Co, Monrovia in 1961. Rebuilt as a 14,294 GRT bulk carrier in 1963, renamed World Choice. To Nauta Corp, Monrovia in 1965, renamed Nautilus. Rebuilt in 1968, bow section of USNS Anacostia fitted. Own bow section fitted to stern of Anacostia. Scrapped at Santander, Spain in 1968.
- Lost Hills – Built in 1944 by Marinship, Sausalito for the United States War Shipping Administration, San Francisco. To Skibs A/S Abu, Oslo, Norway in 1947, renamed Abu. To Trinity Transportation Corp, Monrovia in 1957, renamed Trinity Transporter. Scrapped at Hong Kong in 1960.

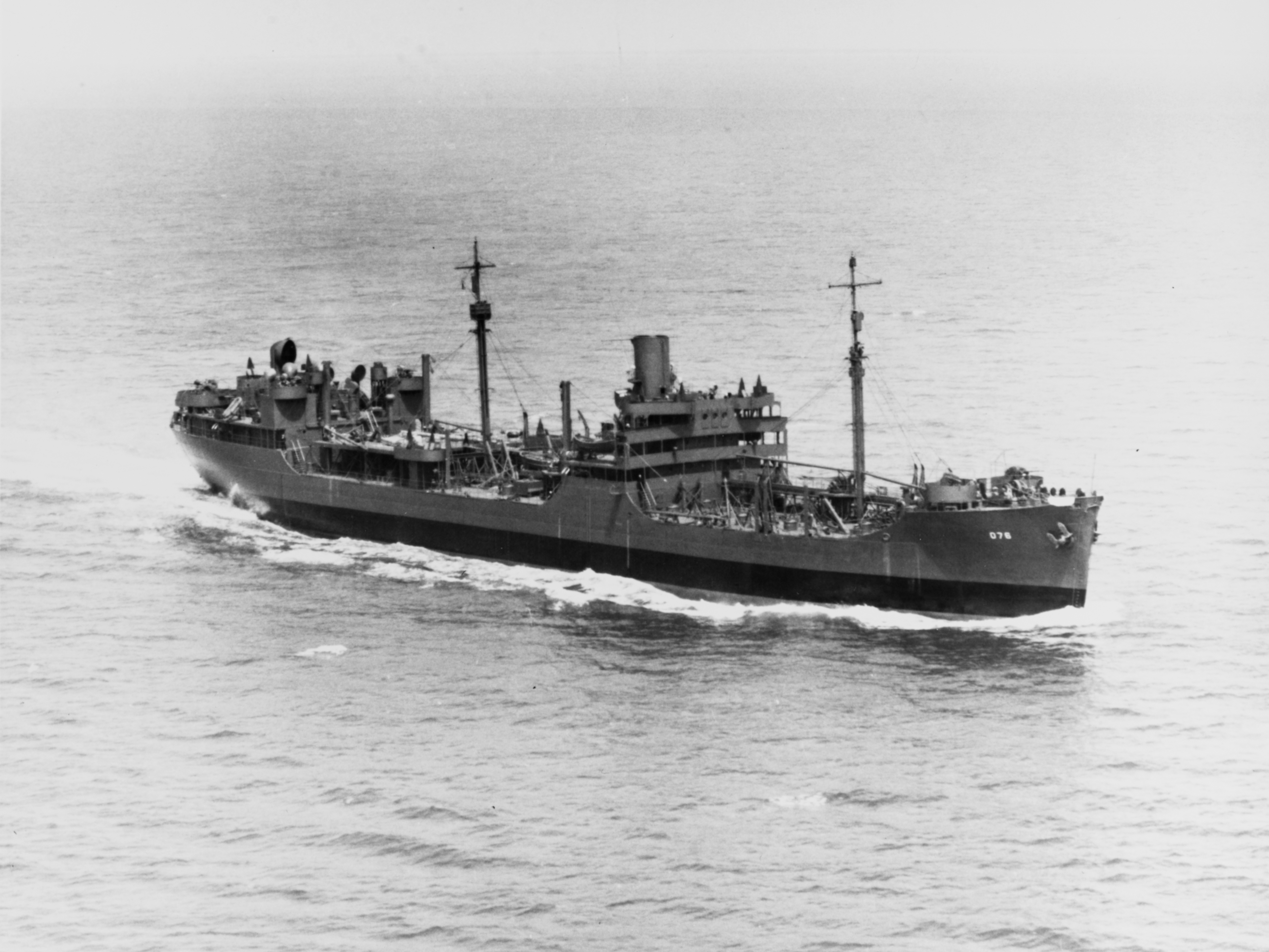
USS Schuykill.

- Louisburg – Built in 1943 by Sun Shipbuilding & Drydock Co, Chester. To United States Navy, commissioned as USS Schuykill (AO-76). To United States Maritime Commission in 1946 but returned to the United States Navy in 1948. To Military Sea Transportation Service in 1949 as USNS Schuykill (T-AO-76). Decommissioned in 1986, sold in 1988.
- Lundy's Lane – Built in 1943 by Kaiser Company, Portland for the United States War Shipping Administration, Portland. To Hvalfangstselsk Blaahval A/S, Oslo in 1948. To Beaverdam Tankers Inc, Monrovia in 1958. Scrapped at Hamburg, West Germany in 1964.
- Lyon's Creek – Built in 1944 by Sun Shipbuilding & Drydock Co, Chester for the United States War Shipping Administration, Philadelphia. To Trinidad Corporation, Wilmington in 1948. Scrapped at Santander in 1973.

== M ==
- Malvern Hill – Built in 1943 by Sun Shipbuilding & Drydock Co., Chester, Pennsylvania for the United States War Shipping Administration, Philadelphia, Pennsylvania. To Standard Oil of New Jersey, Wilmington, Delaware in 1946, renamed Esso Charlotte. To Esso Shipping Company, Wilmington in 1950. To Panama Transport Co, Panama in 1957 then Winco Tankers Ltd, Panama in 1958, renamed Helen H. To Winco Tankers Inc, Wilmington in 1960, rebuilt as 13,268 GRT bulk carrier. To Compangnia Commercial Anelli S.A., Piraeus, Greece in 1973, renamed Anelli. To Lavende Bay Shipping Co, Piraeus in 1978, renamed Mandarin. Scrapped at Gadani Beach, Pakistan in 1982.
- Manassas – Built in 1943 by Sun Shipbuilding & Drydock Co., Chester for the United States War Shipping Administration, Philadelphia. To Ditta Andrea Zanchi, Genoa, Italy in 1948, renamed Emma. To Capo Gallo Compagnia di Navigazione, Messina, Italy in 1963, renamed Capo Emma. Scrapped at La Spezia, Italy in 1976.
- Marin Hills – Built in 1945 by Marinship, Sausalito, California for the United States War Shipping Administration, San Francisco, California. To Skibs A/S Solvang, Stavanger, Norway in 1947, renamed Atlantic Africa. Renamed Kongsholm in 1951 then to Tanker Transport Inc, Monrovia, Liberia later that year and renamed Atlantic Capetown. To Artemision Steamship Co, Monrovia in 1963, renamed Demetrios A. Renamed Lake George in 1966, scrapped at Kaohsiung, Taiwan in 1969.
- Marne – Built in 1945 by Sun Shipbuilding & Drydock Co., Chester for the United States War Shipping Administration, Philadelphia. To American Trading & Production Corporation, Baltimore, Maryland in 1947, renamed American Trader. Scrapped at Kaohsiung in 1962.

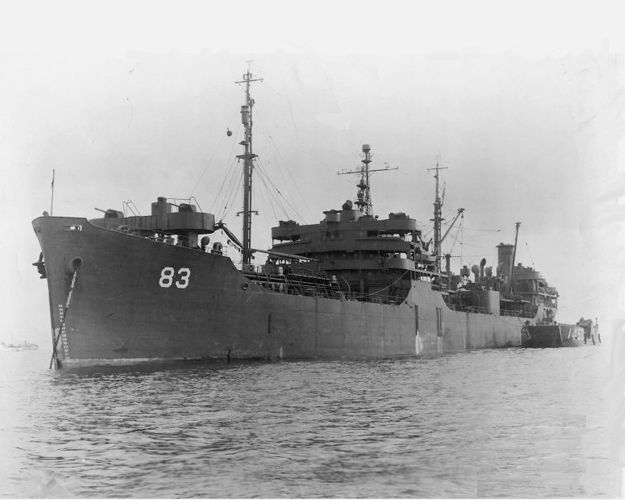
USS Mascoma.

- Mascoma (T2-SE-A2 design) – Built in 1943 by Kaiser Company, Portland, Oregon. To United States Navy, commissioned in 194 as USS Mascoma (AO-83). To Military Sea Transportation Service in 1950 as USNS Mascoma (T-AO-83). To United States Department of Commerce in 1959. To Hudson Waterways Corporation, New York in 1966, renamed Seatrain Oregon. Renamed Transchamplain in 1967. Rebuilt as 7,674 GRT container ship in 1969. To C. I. T. Leasing Corporation, New York in 1971. To American Pacific Container Line Inc in 1980, scrapped at Kaohsiung in 1981.
- Mauvilla – Built in 1944 by Sun Shipbuilding & Drydock Co., Chester for the United States War Shipping Administration, Philadelphia. To Anglo-American Oil Company, London, United Kingdom in 1947, renamed Esso Birmingham. To Esso Petroleum Co, London in 1951. Scrapped at Split. Yugoslavia in 1963.
- McClellan Creek – Built in 1943 by Alabama Drydock and Shipbuilding Company, Mobile, Alabama for the United States War Shipping Administration, Mobile. To Flanigan Loveland Shipping Co, Panama in 1947, renamed Elizabeth A. Flanigan. To Vesta Compagnia Navigacion, Panama in 1955, renamed Kathleen Richardson. To Mobil Tankers Co, S.A., Panama in 1957, renamed Winnebago. To Petroleum Transport International, Durban, South Africa in 1963, renamed Mobil Marketeer. Scrapped at Keelung, Taiwan in 1965.
- McDowell – Built in 1944 by Sun Shipbuilding & Drydock Co., Chester for the United States War Shipping Administration, Philadelphia. Torpedoed and sunk in the Atlantic Ocean (13°08′N 70°02′W by U-516 on 16 December 1943.
- McKittrick Hills – Built in 1944 by Marinship, Sausalito for the United States War Shipping Administration, San Francisco. To Pacific Tankers Inc, Wilmington in 1947. To Western Tankers Inc, New York in 1951. To Alexander S. Onassis Corp, Monrovia in 1957. To Condora Financiera Panama, Monrovia in 1962. Scrapped at Valencia, Spain in 1964.
- Meacham – Built in 1944 by Kaiser Company, Portland for the United States War Shipping Administration, Portland. To American Overseas Tanker Corporation, Wilmington in 1948 the National Tanker Corporation, Wilmington later that year. To Meacham Corporation, Wilmington in 1951 then Charles Kurz & Company, Wilmington later that year, renamed Custis Woods. To United States Department of Commerce in 1965. Scrapped at Santander, Spain in 1966.
- Mechanicsville – Built in 1943 by Kaiser Company, Portland for the United States War Shipping Administration, Portland. To H. Westfal-Larsen & Co, Bergen, Norway in 1948, renamed Hallanger. To Harald A Møller, Oslo, Norway in 1959, renamed Asato. To International Union Marine Corp, Monrovia in 1961, rebuilt at 14,149 GRT bulk carrier, renamed Ally. To Victoria Ocean Transport Ltd, Monrovia in 1966, renamed Victoria Faith. Renamed Grand Trust in 1967. To Concord (Panama) Ltd, Panama in 1973. Scrapped at Kaohsiung in 1978.
- Mesa Verde – Built in 1944 by Kaiser Company, Portland for the United States War Shipping Administration, Portland. To British Tanker Company, London in 1947. To Société Maritime des Petroles BP, Dunkerque, France in 1955, renamed Villandry. Scrapped at La Seyne-sur-Mer, France in 1961.
- Meuse-Argonne – Built in 1945 by Sun Shipbuilding & Drydock Co, Chester for the United States War Shipping Commission, Philadelphia. To Overseas Tankship Corp, Panama in 1948. To Outremer de Navigation Petrolière S.A., Bordeaux in 1951, renamed Caltex Bordeaux. To Unuin Industrielle des Petroles, Bordeaux in 1961. To Société Petromer, Bordeaux in 1967, renamed Petro Paulliac To Tropical Tankers Inc, Panama in 1968, renamed Tropical Grace. To Chowgule & Co Ltd, Bombay, India in 1969. Rebuilt as 10,244 GRT bulk carrier, renamed Maratha Transhipper. Driven ashore and wrecked at Mormugao, India on 28 May 1985.
- Midway Hills – Built in 1943 by Marinship, Sausalito for the United States War Shipping Administration, San Francisco. To Cape Horn Steamship Corporation, New York in 1948, renamed Cryss Jane. To National Phoenix Industries Inc, New York in 1953 then C. & C. Super Corporation, New York in 1955. To Colonial Steamship Corporation, New York in 1956, renamed Hess Mariner. To Hess Tankship Company, Wilmington in 1961. Exploded and broke in two 110 nautical miles (200 km) east of Jacksonville, Florida on 1 October 1961, sank the next day.
- Mill Spring – Built in 1943 by Marinship, Sausalito for Charles Kurz & Company, Wilmington. Rebuilt in 1958, now 12,188 GRT. To Lavender Bay Shipping Co, Panama in 1976, renamed Harmony I. Scrapped at Gadani Beach in 1978.
- Missionary Ridge – Built in 1944 by Sun Shipbuilding & Drydock Co., Chester for the United States War Shipping Administration, Philadelphia. To Panama Ocean, Panama in 1948. Renamed World Traveller in 1956. Rebuilt in 1959, now 12,793 GRT. To World Chieftain Corp, Monrovia that year, renamed World Chieftain. To Continental Oceanic Navigation Corp, Monrovia in 1966, renamed Christine. Renamed Eugenia in 1968. To Far Eastern Navigation Corp, Keelung that year, renamed Chee Lee. Renamed Tunglee in 1970. Scrapped at Kaohsiung in 1977.

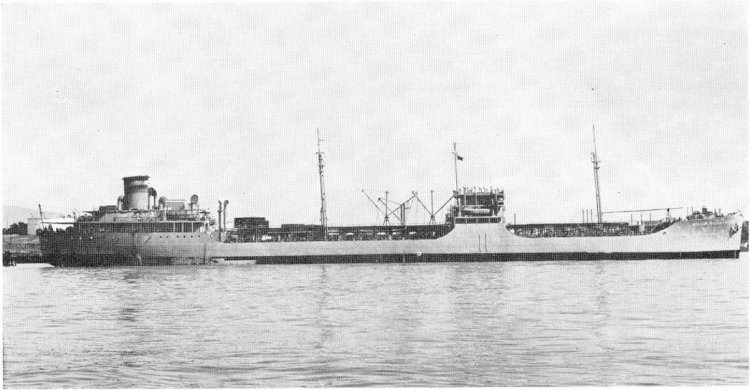
USNS Mission Buenaventura.

- Mission Buenaventura (T2-SE-A2 design) – Built in 1943 by Marinship, Sausalito for the United States War Shipping Administration, San Francisco. To United States Navy in 1947, commissioned as USS Buenaventura (AO-111). To United States Department of Commerce in 1960 then to Military Sea Transportation Service in 1961 as USNS Buenaventura (T-AO-111). Scrapped in Detroit, Michigan in 1973.

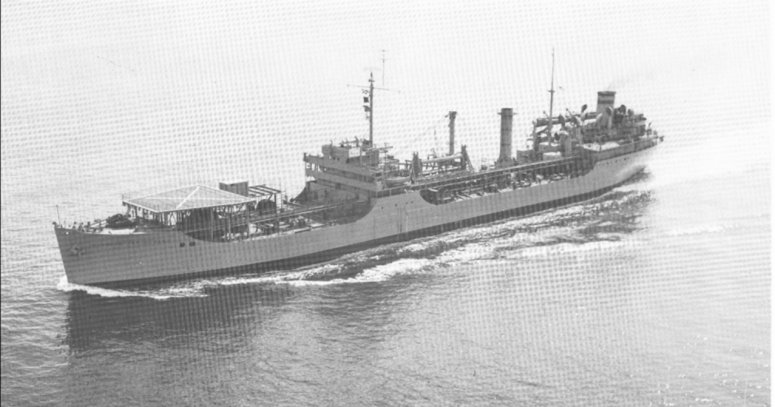
USNS Mission Capistrano.

- Mission Capistrano (T2-SE-A2 design) – Built in 1943 by Marinship, Sausalito for the United States War Shipping Administration, San Francisco. To United States Navy in 1947, commissioned as USS Mission Capistrano (AO-112). To United States Department of Commerce in 1955 then to Military Sea Transportation Service in 1956 as USNS Mission Capistrano (T-AO-112). To United States Navy in 1960, converted to sonar experimental ship USNS Mission Capistrano (T-AG-162). To United States Department of Commerce in 1970, converted to drilling ship in 1972, renamed Capistrano. To Mission Drilling & Exploration Corporation, New Orleans, Louisiana in 1975, renamed Mission Exploration. Scrapped at Brownsville, Texas in 1980.
- Mission Carmel (T2-SE-A2 design) – Built in 1943 by Marinship, Sausalito for the United States War Shipping Administration, San Francisco. To United States Navy in 1947, commissioned as USS Mission Carmel (AO-113). To United States Department of Commerce in 1957. To Litton Industries Leasing Corporation, Wilmington in 1967. Rebuilt as 11,601 GRT container ship, renamed Houston. To Reynolds Leasing Corporation, Wilmington in 1975. Scrapped at Seville, Spain in 1984.

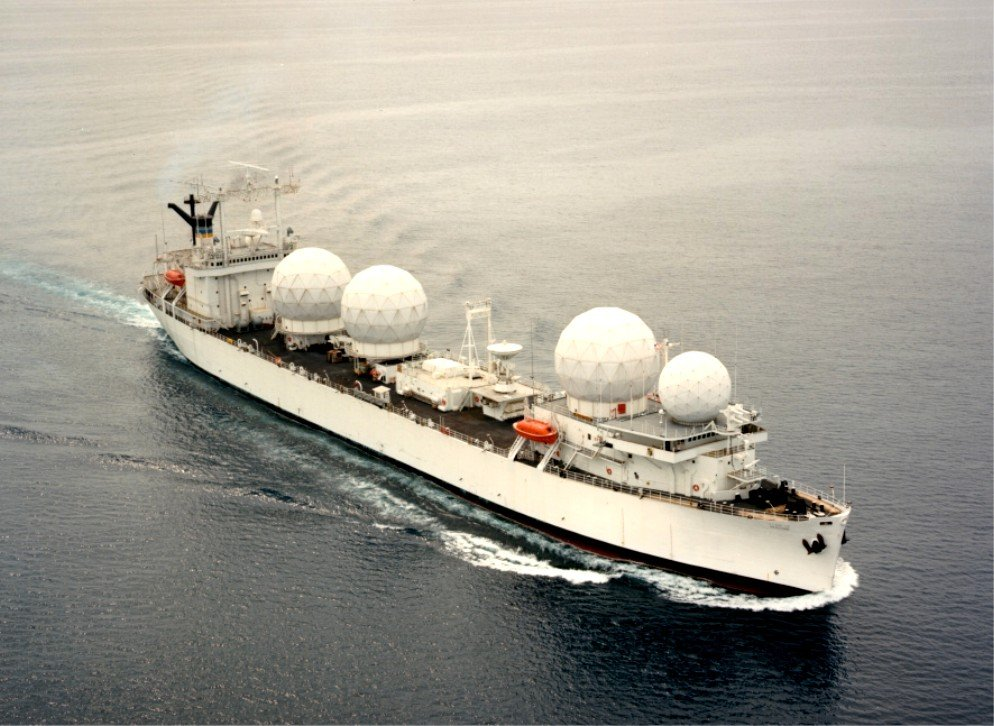
USNS Redstone.

- SS Mission De Pala (T2-SE-A2 design) – Built in 1943 by Marinship, Sausalito for the United States War Shipping Administration, San Francisco. To United States Navy in 1947, commissioned as USS Mission De Pala (AO-114). To Military Sea Transportation Service in 1949 as USNS Mission De Pala (T-AO-114). To United States Department of Commerce in 1954. To Military Sea Transportation Service in 1956. To United States Department of Commerce in 1958 and laid up. To United States Navy in 1964, converted to a missile range instrumentation ship, commissioned in 1965 as USS Johnstown (AGM-20), renamed USS Redstone (AGM-20) later that year. To Military Sea Transportation Service in 1966 as USNS Redstone (T-AGM-20). Scrapped in 1995.
- Mission Dolores (T2-SE-A2 design) – Built in 1944 by Marinship, Sausalito for the United States War Shipping Administration, San Francisco. To United States Navy in 1947, commissioned as USS Mission Dolores (AO-115). To Military Sea Transportation Service in 1949 as USNS Mission Dolores (T-AO-115). To United States Department of Commerce in 1955. To Military Sea Transportation Service in 1956 then to United States Department of Commerce in 1957. To Sea Land Service Inc, Wilmington in 1969, rebuilt at 11,601 GRT container ship, renamed Tampa. To Reynolds Leasing Corporation, Wilmington in 1970. Scrapped at Castellón de la Plana in 1984.
- Mission Loreto (T2-SE-A2 design) – Built in 1944 by Marinship, Sausalito for the United States War Shipping Administration, San Francisco. To United States Navy in 1947, commissioned as USS Mission Loreto (AO-116). To Military Sea Transportation Service in 1949 as USNS Mission Loreto (T-AO-116). To United States Department of Commerce in 1955. To Military Sea Transportation Service in 1959. Scrapped at Portland in 1975.

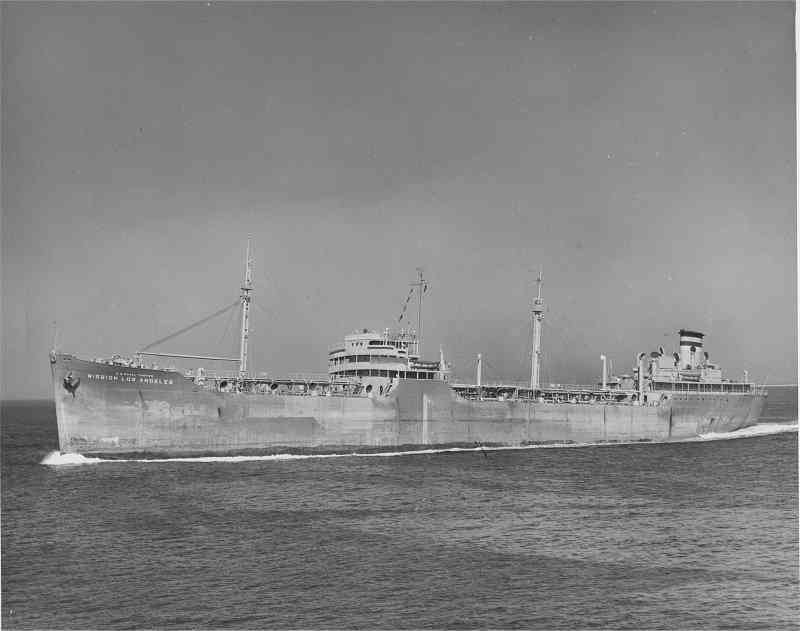
USNS Mission Los Angeles.

- Mission Los Angeles (T2-SE-A2 design) – Built in 1945 by Marinship, Sausalito for the United States War Shipping Administration, San Francisco. To United States Navy in 1948 as USS Mission Los Angeles (AO-117). To Military Sea Transportation Service in 1949 as USNS Mission Los Angeles (T-AO-117). To United States Department of Commerce in 1957. Scrapped in Cleveland, Ohio in 1975.

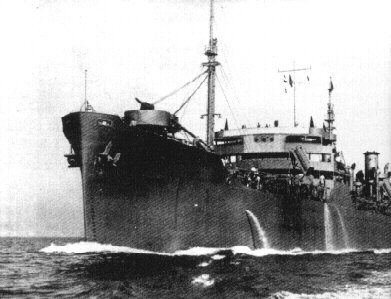
USNS Mission Purisima.

- Mission Purisima (T2-SE-A2 design) – Built in 1945 by Marinship, Sausalito for the United States War Shipping Administration, San Francisco. To United States Navy in 1947 as USS Mission Purisima (AO-118). To Military Sea Transportation Service in 1949 as USNS Mission Purisima (T-AO-118). To United States Department of Commerce in 1955. To Military Sea Transportation Service in 1956, then to United States Department of Commerce in 1957. Converted to floating storage facility in 1975.
- Mission San Antonio (T2-SE-A2 design) – Built in 1945 by Marinship, Sausalito for the United States War Shipping Administration, San Francisco. To United States Navy in 1947 as USS Mission San Antonio (AO-119). To Military Sea Transportation Service in 1949 as USNS Mission San Antonio (T-AO-119). To United States Department of Commerce in 1954. To Military Sea Transportation Service in 1956. To United States Department of Commerce in 1959, then to Military Sea Transportation Service in 1960. To United States Department of Commerce in 1965, renamed Transarctic. To Hudson Waterways Corporation, New York in 1966. Rebuilt as 7,435 GRT container ship, renamed Seatrain San Juan. To Tyler Tanker Corporation, New York in 1972. To United States Department of Commerce in 1975. renamed San Juan in 1978. Scrapped at Castellón de la Plana in 1983.
- Mission San Carlos (T2-SE-A2 design) – Built in 1945 by Marinship, Sausalito for the United States War Shipping Administration, San Francisco. To United States Navy in 1947 as USS Mission San Carlos (AO-120). To Military Sea Transportation Service in 1949 as USNS Mission San Carlos (T-AO-120). To United States Department of Commerce in 1957. To Hudson Waterways Corporation, New York in 1966. Rebuilt with bow section from San Jacinto to form 8,012 GRT vehicle carrier, renamed Seatrain Maryland. To United States Department of Commerce in 1975. Renamed Maryland in 1978. Scrapped at Kaohsiung in 1985.

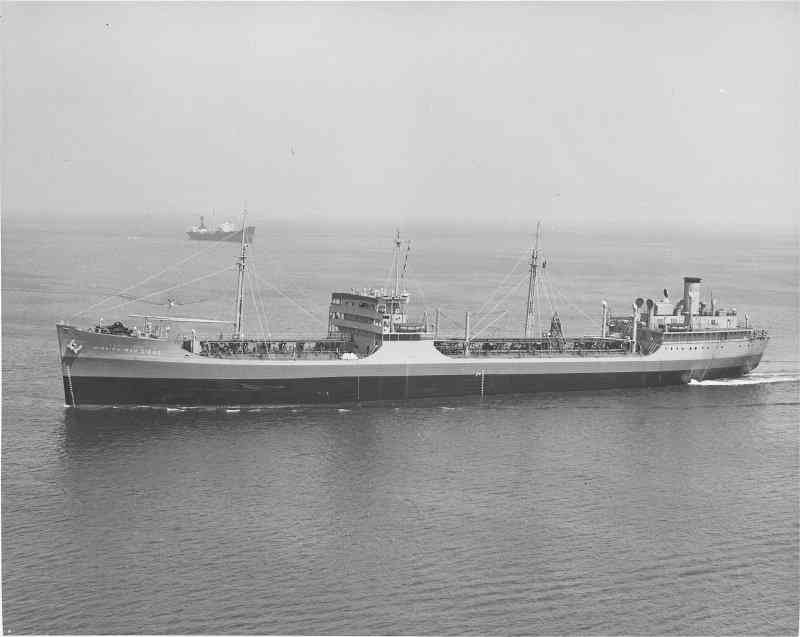
USNS Mission San Diego.

- Mission San Diego (T2-SE-A2 design) – Built in 1944 by Marinship, Sausalito for the United States War Shipping Administration, San Francisco. To United States Navy in 1947 as USS Mission San Diego (AO-121). To Military Sea Transportation Service in 1949 as USNS Mission San Diego (T-AO-121). To United States Department of Commerce in 1954. To Military Sea Transportation Service in 1956, then to United States Department of Commerce in 1957. Rebuilt in 1967 with bow of Maine and midsection from San Jacinto to form 8,039 GRT vehicle carrier. To Hudson Waterways Corporation, New York, renamed Seatrain Washington. To Tyler Tanker Corporation, New York in 1972. To United States Department of Commerce in 1975. Renamed Washington in 1978. Scrapped in 2001.

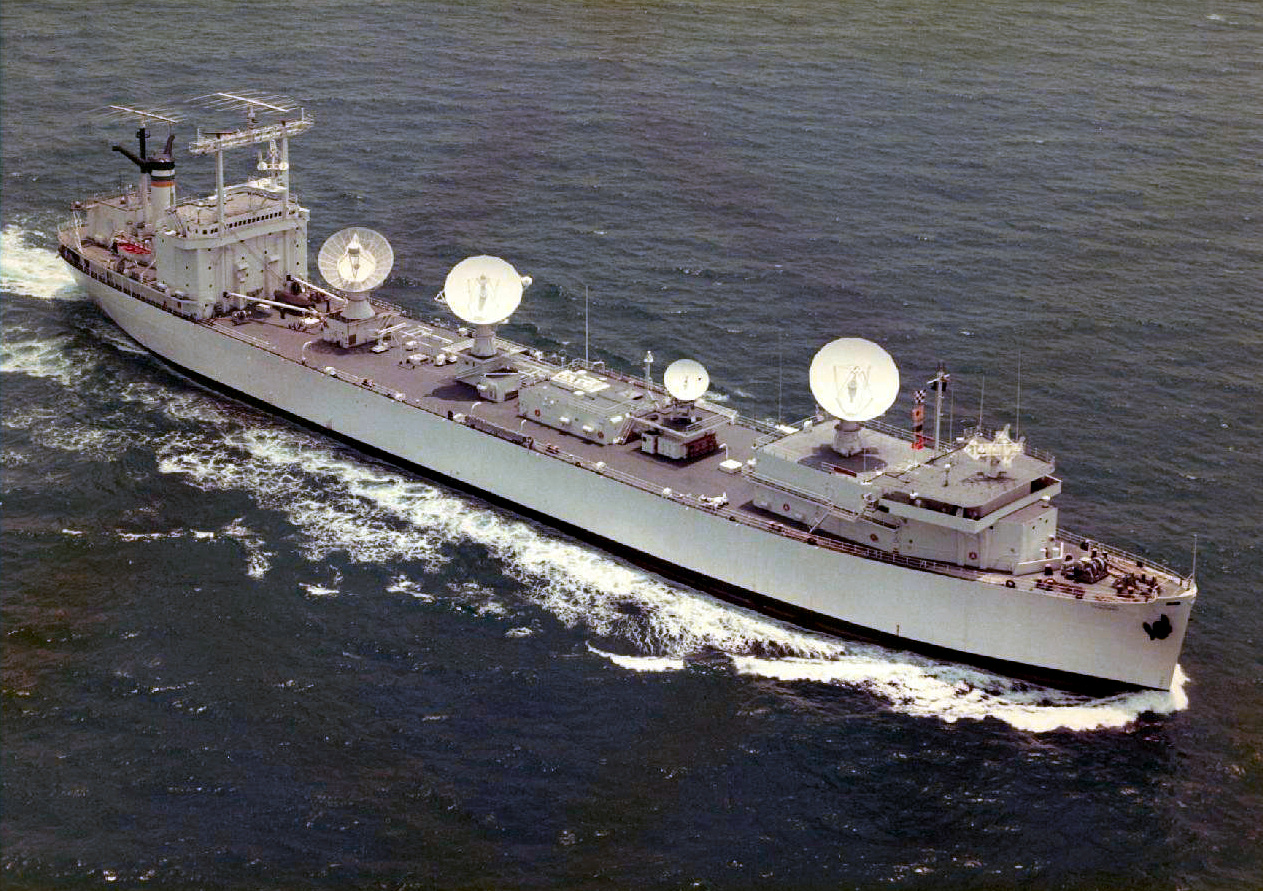
USNS Vanguard.

- Mission San Fernando (T2-SE-A2 design) – Built in 1944 by Marinship, Sausalito for the United States War Shipping Administration, San Francisco. To United States Navy in 1947 as USS Mission San Fernando (AO-122). To Military Sea Transportation Service in 1949 as USNS Mission San Fernando (T-AO-122). To United States Department of Commerce in 1955. To Military Sea Transportation Service in 1956, then to United States Department of Commerce in 1957. To United States Navy in 1964, converted to missile range identification ship, commissioned at USS Muscle Shoals (AGM-19). Renamed USS Vanguard (AGM-19) in 1965, then to Military Sea Transportation Service in 1966 as USNS Vanguard (T-AGM-19). Reclassified as a navigational test ship, designated USNS Vanguard (T-AGM-194) in 1980. Scrapped at Brownsville, Texas in 2013.

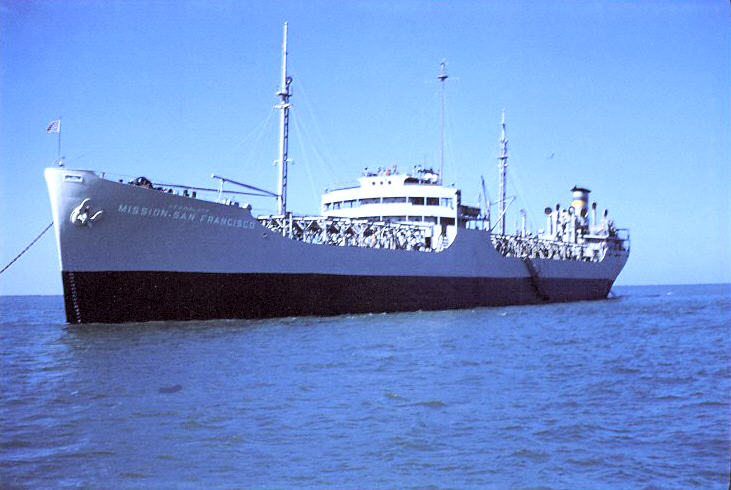
USNS Mission San Francisco.

- Mission San Francisco (T2-SE-A2 design) – Built in 1945 by Marinship, Sausalito for the United States War Shipping Administration, San Francisco. To United States Navy in 1947 as USS Mission San Francisco (AO-123). To Military Sea Transportation Service in 1949 as USNS Mission San Francisco (T-AO-123). To United States Department of Commerce in 1954. To Military Sea Transportation Service in 1956. Collided with SS Elna II in the Delaware River on 7 March 1957, exploded and broke in two.

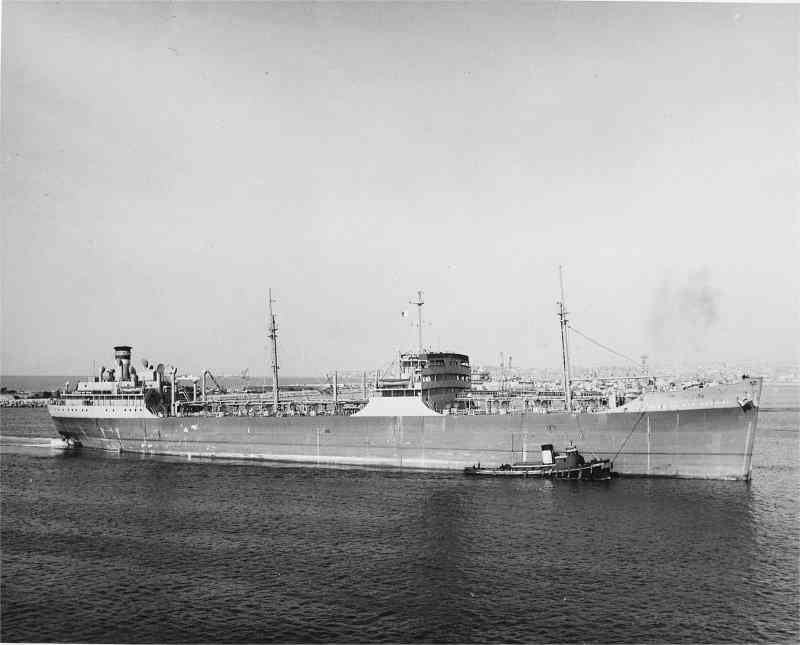
USNS Mission San Gabriel.

- Mission San Gabriel (T2-SE-A2 design) – Built in 1944 by Marinship, Sausalito for the United States War Shipping Administration, San Francisco. To United States Navy in 1947 as USS Mission San Gabriel (AO-124). To Military Sea Transportation Service in 1949 as USNS Mission San Gabriel (T-AO-124). To United States Department of Commerce in 1957. Renamed Delaware in 1966. To Hudson Waterways Corporation, New York later that year, rebuilt as 9,961 GRT container ship and renamed Seatrain Delaware. To Tyler Tanker Corporation, New York in 1972. To United States Department of Commerce in 1975, renamed Delaware in 1978. Scrapped at Castellón de la Plana in 1983.
- Mission San Jose (T2-SE-A2 design) – Built in 1944 by Marinship, Sausalito for the United States War Shipping Administration, San Francisco. To United States Navy in 1947 as USS Mission San Jose (AO-125). To Military Sea Transportation Service in 1949 as USNS Mission San Jose (T-AO-125). To United States Department of Commerce in 1957. Renamed Ohio in 1966. Rebuilt with bow section from Mision San Diego and mid-ship section of Maine to form 8,047 GRT vehicle carrier. To Hudson Waterways Corporation, New York, renamed Seatrain Ohio. To Tyler Tanker Corporation, New York in 1972. To United States Department of Commerce in 1975, renamed Ohio in 1978. Scrapped in 2011.

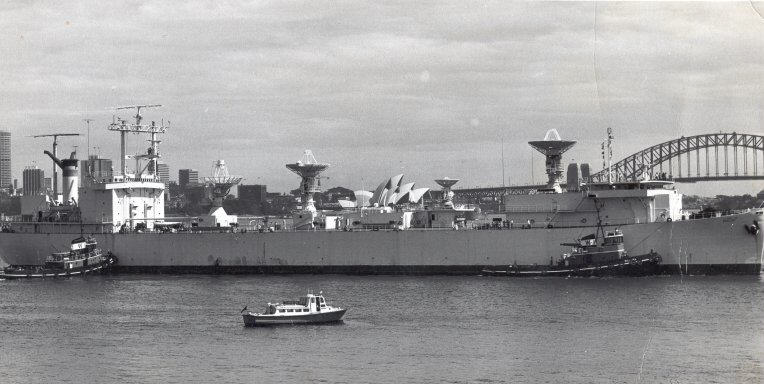
USNS Mercury.

- Mission San Juan (T2-SE-A2 design) – Built in 1944 by Marinship, Sausalito for the United States War Shipping Administration, San Francisco. To United States Navy in 1947 as USS Mission San Juan (AO-126). To Military Sea Transportation Service in 1949 as USNS Mission San Juan (T-AO-126). To United States Department of Commerce in 1958. To United States Navy in 1964, rebuilt as a missile tracking ship. Commissioned in 1965 as USS Flagstaff (AGM-21). To Military Sea Transportation Service in 1966 as USNS Mercury (T-AGM-21). To Matson Navigation Company, San Francisco in 1970, rename Kopaa. Rebuilt at 14,230 GRT bulk carrier in 1971. To Californian and Hawaiian Sugar Company in 1981 then Hawaiian Sugar Transportation Company, New Orleans in 1982. Scrapped at Kaohsiung in 1984.

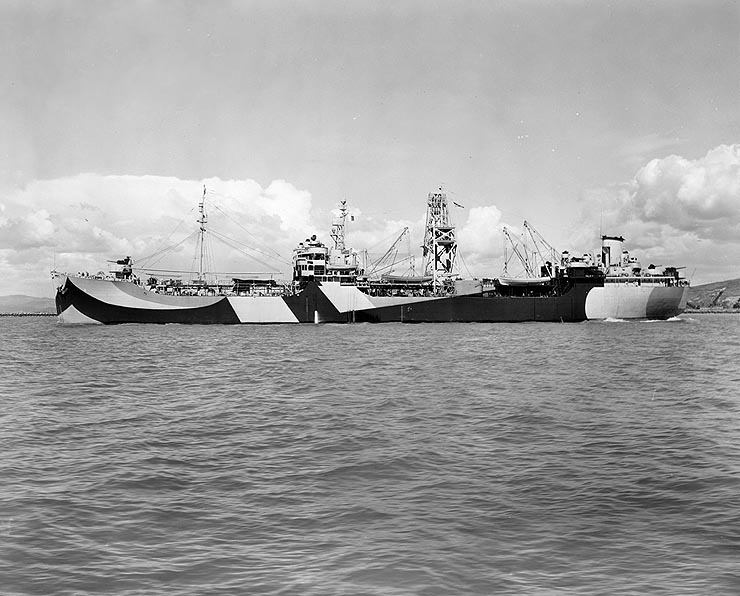
USS Abatan.

- Mission San Lorenzo (T2-SE-A2 design) – Built in 1944 by Marinship, Sausalito. To United States Navy as USS Abatan (AO-92). Converted to a distilling ship later that year, designated USS Abatan (AW-4). Placed in reserve in 1947. To United States Maritime Administration in 1960. To United States Navy in 1962. Used as a storage hulk at Guantanamo Bay, Cuba from 1970. Sunk as a target west of Guadeloupe on 10 March 1980.

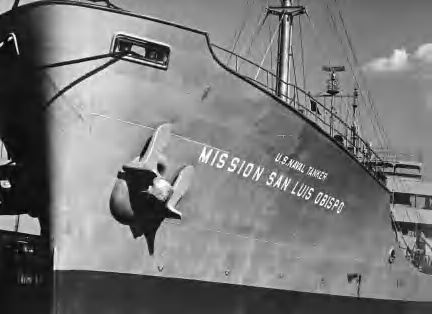
USS Mission San Luis Obispo.

- Mission San Luis Obispo (T2-SE-A2 design) – Built in 1944 by Marinship, Sausalito for the United States War Shipping Administration, San Francisco. To United States Navy in 1947, commissioned as USS San Luis Obispo (AO-127). To Military Sea Transportation Service in 1949 as USNS Mission San Luis Obispo (T-AO-127). To United States Maritime Administration in 1955, then to Military Sea Transportation Service in 1956. To United States Maritime Administration in 1957. To Hudson Waterways Corporation, New York in 1966, rebuilt as combined container ship and train ferry, renamed Seatrain Puerto Rico. Scrapped at Kaohsiung in 1986.
- Mission San Luis Rey (T2-SE-A2 design) – Built in 1944 by Marinship, Sausalito for the United States War Shipping Administration, San Francisco. To United States Navy in 1947, commissioned as USS Mission San Luis Rey (AO-128). To Military Sea Transportation Service in 1949 as USNS Mission San Luis Rey (T-AO-128). To United States Maritime Administration in 1955, then to Military Sea Transportation Service in 1956. To United States Maritime Administration in 1957. Scrapped at Brownsville, Texas in 1972–73.
- Mission San Miguel (T2-SE-A2 design) – Built in 1944 by Marinship, Sausalito for the United States War Shipping Administration, San Francisco. To United States Navy in 1947, commissioned as USS Mission San Miguel (AO-129). To Military Sea Transportation Service in 1949 as USNS Mission San Miguel (T-AO-129). To United States Maritime Administration in 1954, then to Military Sea Transportation Service in 1956. Ran aground and was wrecked on the Maro Reef, Hawaii on 8 October 1957.

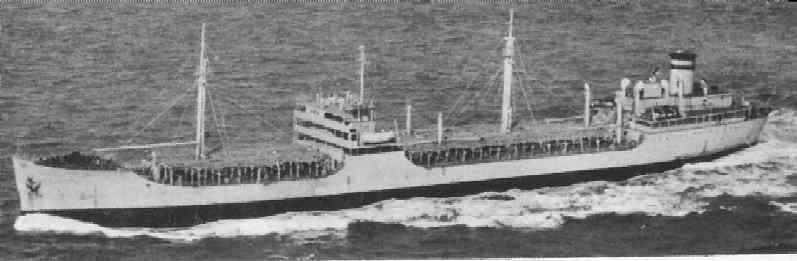
USNS Mission San Rafael.

- Mission San Rafael (T2-SE-A2 design) – Built in 1943 by Marinship, Sausalito for the United States War Shipping Administration, San Francisco. To United States Navy in 1947, commissioned as USS Mission San Rafael (AO-130). To Military Sea Transportation Service in 1949 as USNS Mission San Rafael (T-AO-130). To United States Department of Commerce in 1955, then to Military Sea Transportation Service in 1956. Scrapped at Baltimore in 1971.

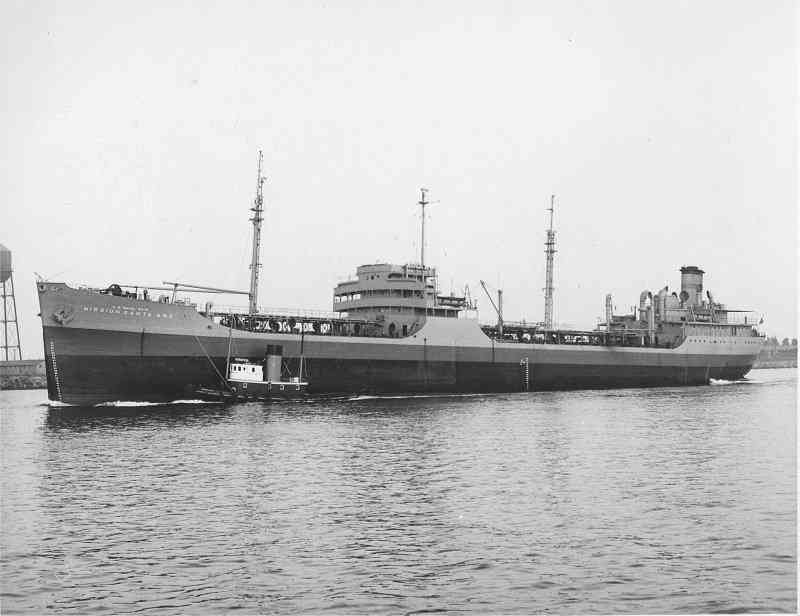
USNS Mission Santa Ana.

- Mission Santa Ana (T2-SE-A2 design) – Built in 1945 by Marinship, Sausalito for the United States War Shipping Administration, San Francisco. To United States Navy in 1948, commissioned as USS Mission Santa Ana (AO-137). To Military Sea Transportation Service in 1949 as USNS Mission Santa Ana (T-AO-137). To United States Department of Commerce in 1955, then to Military Sea Transportation Service in 1956. To United States Department of Commerce in 1958. Scrapped at Terminal Island, California in 1975.
- Mission Santa Barbara (T2-SE-A2 design) – Built in 1944 by Marinship, Sausalito for the United States War Shipping Administration, San Francisco. To United States Navy in 1947, commissioned as USS Mission Santa Barbara (AO-131). To Military Sea Transportation Service in 1949 as USNS Mission Santa Barbara (T-AO-131). To United States Department of Commerce in 1954, then to Military Sea Transportation Service in 1956. To United States Department of Commerce in 1957. To Hudson Waterways Corporation in 1966. Rebuilt with bow section from Fruitvale Hills to form 7,991 GRT vehicle carrier, renamed Seatrain Carolina. To United States Department of Commerce in 1975. Renamed Carolina in 1978. Scrapped at Kaohsiung in 1984.
- Mission Santa Clara (T2-SE-A2 design) – Built in 1944 by Marinship, Sausalito for the United States War Shipping Administration, San Francisco. To United States Navy in 1947, commissioned as USS Mission Santa Clara (AO-132). To Military Sea Transportation Service in 1949 as USNS Mission Santa Clara (T-AO-132). To United States Department of Commerce in 1959. To United States Navy in 1962 the Pakistan Navy in 1963, commissioned as PNS Dacca. Still in service in 1995.
- Mission Santa Cruz (T2-SE-A2 design) – Built in 1943 by Marinship, Sausalito for the United States War Shipping Administration, San Francisco. To United States Navy in 1947, commissioned as USS Mission Santa Cruz (AO-133). To Military Sea Transportation Service in 1949 as USNS Mission Santa Cruz (T-AO-133). To United States Department of Commerce in 1954. To Military Sea Transportation Service in 1956. To United States Department of Commerce in 1959, then Military Sea Transportation Service in 1960. Scrapped at Baltimore, Maryland in 1971.
- Mission Santa Maria (T2-SE-A2 design) – Built in 1944 by Marinship, Sausalito for the United States War Shipping Administration, San Francisco. To Greenwich Shipping Corp, Panama in 1948, renamed Cyrus. To Caribbean Land & Shipping Corp, Panmama in 1949. To Aurora Compagnia Navegacion, Panama in 1950, renamed John. Rebuilt in 1951, now 11,951 GRT. To Pacific Coast Compagnia de Navegacion S.A., Panama in 1953, renamed Ellen H. Jacks. To España Compagnia Navegacion S.A., Panama in 1956. Renamed Andros Mercury in 1959 then Grammos in 1960. To Reconquista Societa Anonyme Mari, Buenos Aires, Argentina later that year, renamed Albatros. To Gosford Marine Panama, Monrovia in 1964, renamed Albaluz. To John S. Latsis, Piraeus in 1966, renamed Haravgi. To Galeta Ocean Equipment & Shipping Co, Panama in 1969, renamed Galeta. Converted to 7,892 GRT offshore supply ship in 1970. To Payardi Shipping & Contractor Co, Panama in 1971, renamed Sept Iles. Scrapped at Split in 1973.

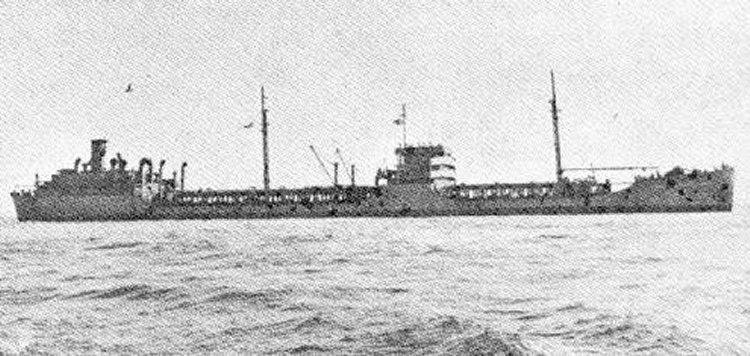
USNS Mission Santa Ynez.

- Mission Santa Ynez (T2-SE-A2 design) – Built in 1944 by Marinship, Sausalito for the United States War Shipping Administration, San Francisco. To United States Navy in 1947, commissioned as USS Mission Santa Ynez (AO-134). To Military Sea Transportation Service in 1949 as USNS Mission Santa Ynez (T-AO-134). Laid up in 1975. Scrapped at Brownsville in 2010.

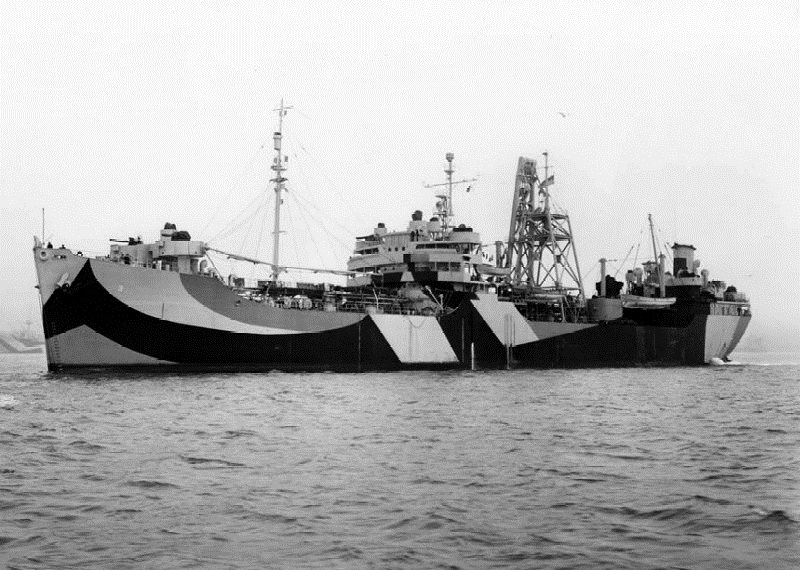
USS Pasig.

- Mission San Xavier (T2-SE-A2 design) – Built in 1944 by Marinship, Sausalito. Laid down as Mission San Xavier but launched as Pasig. To United States Navy, commissioned as USS Pasig (AO-91) but redesignated USS Pasig (AW-3) later that year. Decommissioned in 1955, scrapped in 1975.

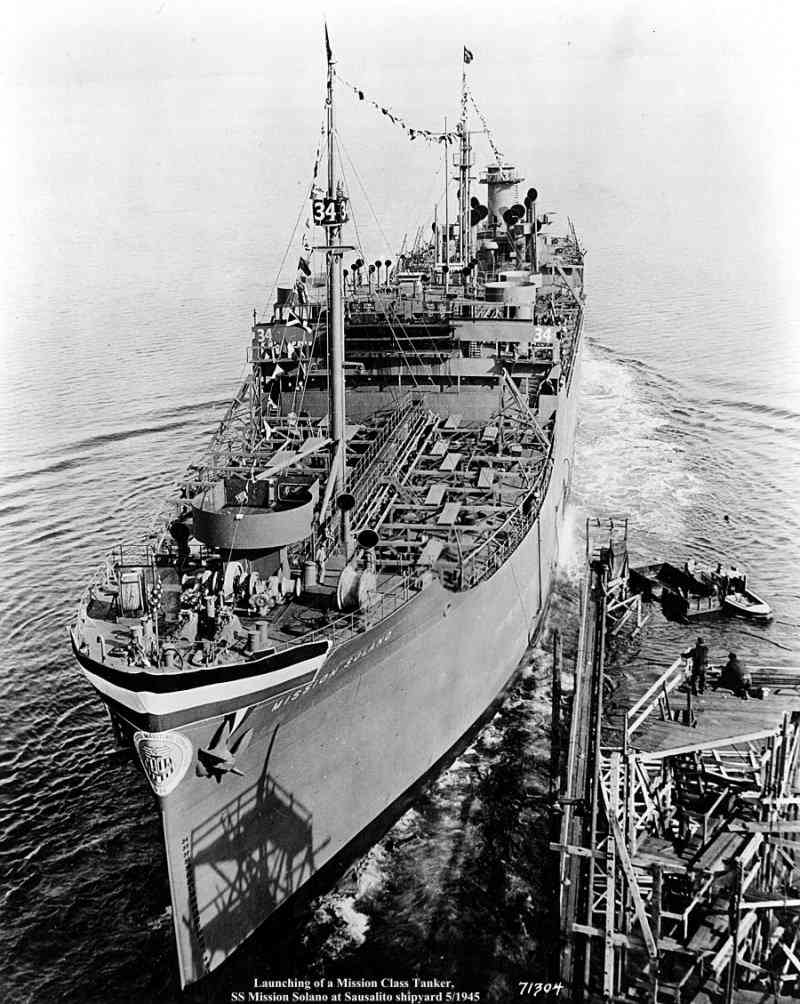
Mission Solano.

- Mission Solano (T2-SE-A2 design) – Built in 1944 by Marinship, Sausalito for the United States War Shipping Administration, San Francisco. To United States Navy in 1947, commissioned as USS Mission Solano (AO-135). To Military Sea Transportation Service in 1949 as USNS Mission Solano (T-AO-135). To United States Department of Commerce in 1957. Rebuilt in 1967 as 11,601 GRT container ship. To Sea Land Services Inc, Wilmington, renamed Jacksonville. To Madison Transportation Corporation, Wilmington in 1968. To Reynolds Leasing Corporation, Wilmington in 1975. Scrapped at Castellón de la Plana in 1984.
- Mission Soledad (T2-SE-A2 design) – Built in 1944 by Marinship, Sausalito for the United States War Shipping Administration, San Francisco. To United States Navy in 1947, commissioned as USS Mission Soledad (AO-136). To Military Sea Transportation Service in 1949 as USNS Mission Soledad (T-AO-136). To United States Department of Commerce in 1957. To Hudson Waterways Corporation, New York in 1967, renamed Seatrain California then Transontario later that year. To C.I.T. Leasing Corporation, New York in 1971. Rebuilt in 1973 as 7,373 GRT container ship. To Matson Navigation Company, San Francisco in 1974 then Greyhound Leasing & Financial Corp, Panama in 1975. Scrapped at Kaohsiung in 1979.
- Mobile Bay – Built in 1945 by Alabama Shipbuilding & Drydock Company, Mobile for the United States War Shipping Administration, Mobile. To Baltic Trading Co, London in 1947, renamed Zeitoun. To I/S Modal, Oslo in 1959, renamed Modal. To Penn Export Co. Inc, New York in 1961, rebuilt as 10,534 GRT bulk carrier, renamed Penn Exporter. Scrapped at Kaohsiung in 1971.
- Moccasin Gap – Built in 1945 by Alabama Shipbuilding & Drydock Company, Mobile for the United States War Shipping Administration, Mobile. To Overseas Tankship Corp, Panama in 1947. Renamed Caltex Suez in 1952. To Overseas Tankship (UK) Ltd, London in 1959, Scrapped at Osaka, Japan in 1962.
- Modoc Point – Built in 1945 by Kaiser Company, Portland for the United States War Shipping Administration, Portland. To Anglo Saxon Petroleum Ltd, London in 1947, renamed Theodoxus. To Shell Petroleum, London in 1955. To Shell Tankers Ltd, London in 1960. Scrapped at Faslane, Dunbartonshire, United Kingdom in 1962.
- Molino Del Rey – Built in 1944 by Sun Shipbuilding & Drydock Company, Chester for the United States War Shipping Administration, Philadelphia. To Standard Oil of New Jersey, Wilmington in 1947, renamed Esso Greensboro. To Esso Shipping Company, Wilmington in 1950. Collided with Esso Suez in the Gulf of Mexico on 20 April 1951, caught fire and was abandoned. Subsequently, rebuilt to 11,217 GRT. To Panama Transport Co, Panama in 1952, renamed Esso San Juan. To Petromar Compagnia de Navegazion, Buenos Aires in 1961, renamed Petromar Cordoba. Scrapped at Valencia in 1967.
- Monmouth – Built in 1944 by Sun Shipbuilding & Drydock Company, Chester for Keystone Tankship Corporation, Wilmington. To Charles Kurz & Co Inc, Wilmington in 1969. Rebuilt in 1970, now 16,376 GRT. Scrapped at Brownsville in 1986.
- Monocasy – Built in 1944 by Sun Shipbuilding & Drydock Company, Chester for the United States War Shipping Administration, Philadelphia. To Stanoling Marine Transport Company, Wilmington in 1948, renamed R. E. Wilson. To Carbide & Carbon Chemicals Company, Wilmington in 1949, rebuilt as 9,987 GRT chemical tanker. To Union Carbide Corporation, Wilmington in 1959. Scrapped at Santander in 1972.
- Montebello Hills – Built in 1944 by Marinship, Sausalito for the United States War Shipping Administration, San Francisco. To Pacific Tankers Inc, San Francisco in 1948. To Western Tankers Inc, New York in 1951. To Alexander S. Onassis Corp, Monrovia in 1957. To Condor Financiera Panama S.A., Monrovia in 1962. Renamed Amber in 1963. Scrapped at Keelung in 1969.
- Montezuma Castle – Built in 1944 by Kaiser Company, Portland for the United States War Shipping Administration, Portland. To the French Government, Dunkerque in 1948, renamed Esso Bretagne. To Esso Standard Société Anonyme Française, Le Havre in 1956. To Mace Shipping Co, Piraeus in 1960, rebuilt as 15,579 GRT bulk carrier, renamed Faros. Reflagged to Liberia in 1965. To Creole Shipping Ltd, Nassau, Bahamas in 1974, renamed Pyramid Viking. Scrapped at Brownsville in 1977.
- Moor's Fields – Built in 1944 by Sun Shipbuilding & Drydock Company, Chester for the United States War Shipping Administration, Philadelphia. To Gulf Oil Corporation, Philadelphia in 1947. Renamed Gulfland in 1948. To Blackships Inc, Wilmington in 1957, rebuilt to 12,842 GRT, renamed Gulfdeer. To Apex Tankers Company, St. Louis, Missouri in 1980, renamed Little Apex. Scrapped at Kaohsiung in 1982.
- Muir Woods – Built in 1945 by Kaiser Company, Portland for the United States War Shipping Administration, Portland. To the Soviet Union that year, renamed El'Brus. To United States Maritime Commission in 1948, renamed Muir Woods then to United States Navy, commissioned at USS Muir Woods (AO-139). To Military Sea Transportation Service in 1949 as USNS Muir Woods (T-AO-139). To United States Department of Commerce in 1959. Scrapped at Cleveland in 1975.
- Multnomah – Built in 1945 by Kaiser Company, Portland for the United States War Shipping Administration, Portland. To Standard Oil of New Jersey in 1947, renamed Esso Worcester. To Esso Shipping Co, Wilmington in 1950. To Humble Shipping & Refining Company, Wilmington in 1960. To Hess Tankship Company, Wilmington in 1961, renamed Hess Refiner. Rebuilt in 1962 to 14,211 GRT. To Bolton Shipping Co Inc, Wilmington in 1976, renamed Pisces. Scrapped at Kaohsiung in 1984.
- Murfreesboro – Built in 1944 by Sun Shipbuilding & Drydock Company, Chester for the United States War Shipping Administration, Philadelphia. To Keystone Shipping Company, Philadelphia in 1947, renamed Atlantic Traveller. Renamed Murfreesboro in 1959. To Sabine Towing & Transportation Company, Baltimore in 1965, renamed Neches. Scrapped at Brownsville in 1982.
- Musgrove Mills – Built in 1944 by Sun Shipbuilding & Drydock Company, Chester for the United States War Shipping Administration, Philadelphia. To Gulf Oil Corporation, Philadelphia in 1947, renamed Gulfmills. To Marine Corporation, Wilmington in 1961, renamed Marine Electric. Rebuilt at 13,757 GRT bulk carrier in 1962. Capsized, broke in two and sank in the Atlantic Ocean (37°52′N 74°46′W) on 12 February 1983.

== N ==
- Nehalem – Built in 1944 by Kaiser Company, Portland, Oregon for the United States War Shipping Administration, Portland. To Gulf Oil Corporation, Philadelphia, Pennsylvania in 1948, renamed Gulfglow. To Emder Tankschiffe GmbH, Emden, West Germany in 1960, renamed Emsfalke. Scrapped at Hamburg, West Germany in 1965.
- New Echota – Built in 1945 by Kaiser Company, Portland for the United States War Shipping Administration, Portland. To Overseas Tankship Corp, Panama in 1947. Renamed Caltex Oslo in 1952. To Overseas Tankship (UK) Ltd, London, United Kingdom in 1955. Scrapped at Osaka, Japan in 1960.
- New Hope – Built in 1945 by Sun Shipbuilding & Drydock Co., Chester, Pennsylvania for the United States War Shipping Administration, Philadelphia. To Administration Nacional de Combustibles, Alcohol y Portland, Montevideo, Uruguay in 1947, renamed Ancap Tercero. Scrapped at Montevideo in 1979.
- New London – Built in 1943 by Kaiser Company, Portland for the United States War Shipping Administration, Portland. To Arctic Tankers Inc, New York in 1948. To Lexington Transport Inc, Monrovia, Liberia in 1956, renamed Fugue. Scrapped at Keelung, Taiwan in 1965.
- New Market – Built in 1945 by Sun Shipbuilding & Drydock Co, Chester for the United States War Shipping Administration, Philadelphia. To Trinidad Corporation, Wilmington, Delaware in 1946. Rebuilt in 1968, now 14,712 GRT, renamed Fort Worth. Renamed Meursalt in 1981. Scrapped at Chittagong, India in 1982.
- Newberg – Built in 1944 by Marinship, Sausalito, California for the United States War Shipping Administration, San Francisco, California. To Standard Oil of New Jersey, Wilmington in 1947, renamed Esso Asheville. To Esso Shipping Company, Wilmington in 1950. To Western Ocean Transport Company, Wilmington in 1960, renamed Point Arena. Rebuilt as a 10,381 GRT bulk carrier in 1964, renamed Rice Queen. To Bulk Food Carriers Inc, San Francisco in 1974. Renamed Delta Conveyor in 1980, converted to barge.
- Newhall Hills – Built in 1944 by Marinship, Sausalito for the United States War Shipping Administration, San Francisco. Collided with Monica off the Goodwin Sands, United Kingdom on 24 May 1947, exploded and lost bow. Subsequently, rebuilt to 10,601 GRT. Sold to Hindustan Steam Shipping Co, Newcastle upon Tyne, Northumberland, United Kingdom, renamed Afghanistan. To Corrado Società di Navigazione, Genoa, Italy in 1953, renamed Giacomo Corrado. Scrapped at Vado Ligure, Italy in 1960.

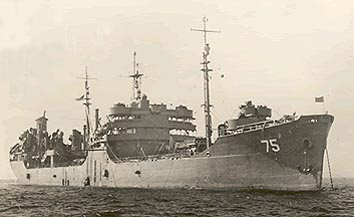
USS Saugatuck.

- Newtown – Built in 1942 by Sun Shipbuilding & Drydock Co, Chester. To United States Navy, commissioned in 1943 as USS Saugatuck (AO-75). To United States Maritime Commission in 1946. To Military Sea Transportation Service in 1949 as USNS Saugatuck (T-AO-75). To United States Maritime Administration in 1974. Scrapped in 2006.
- Nickajack Trail – Built in 1944 by Marinship, Sausalito for the United States War Shipping Administration, San Francisco. Wrecked at Enewetak Atoll, Marshall Islands on 30 March 1946.
- Ninety-Six – Built in 1945 by Alabama Drydock and Shipbuilding Company, Mobile, Alabama for the United States War Shipping Administration, Mobile. To Southern Trading Company, Wilmington in 1947, renamed Atlantic Transporter. To Pan-Oceanic Navigation Corporation, New York in 1953. Renamed Pan-Oceanic Transporter in 1956. To Penn Navigation Company, New York in 1957. Renamed Penn Transporter in 1959. Rebuilt at 10,277 GRT bulk carrier in 1960. To Overseas Bulk Shipping Corp, Panama in 1970, renamed Henna. Sprang a leak and foundered in the Indian Ocean (34°57′S 72°08′E) on 3 March 1971.
- Nordahl Grieg – Built in 1944 by Alabama Drydock and Shipbuilding Company, Mobile for the Norwegian Government. To Skibs A/S Preba, Risør, Norway in 1946. To Rio Caribe Compagnia Armadora S.A., Piraeus, Greece in 1962, renamed Emporos. To Marfield Compagnia Navigation S.A., Piraeus in 1963. Reflagged to Liberia and renamed Cosmopolitan in 1966. Renamed Holy Cross in 1973. Scrapped at Split, Yugoslavia in 1976.
- North Point – Built in 1944 by Alabama Drydock and Shipbuilding Company, Mobile for the United States War Shipping Administration, Mobile. To Lanmore Co. Inc, Panama in 1947. To North Point Corp, Panama in 1948. To Panama Transport Corp, Panama in 1955, renamed Esso Colon. Scrapped at Trieste, Italy in 1960.
- Northfield – Built in 1943 by Kaiser Company, Portland for the United States War Shipping Administration, Portland. To Paco Tankers Inc, Wilmington in 1948. Rebuilt in 1961, now 14,439 GRT. Ran aground off Bombay, India on 16 July 1974. Consequently, scrapped at Karachi, Pakistan.

== O ==
- Ochoco – Built in 1944 by Kaiser Company, Portland, Oregon for the United States War Shipping Administration, Portland. To the French Government, Le Havre in 1948, renamed Esso Normandie. To Esso Standard Société Anonyme Française, Le Havre in 1956. Scrapped at La Seyne-sur-Mer, France in 1961.
- Ocklawaha (T2-SE-A2 design) – Built in 1943 by Marinship, Sausalito, California. To the United States Navy, commissioned in 1944 as USS Ocklawaha (AO-84). To United States Maritime Commission in 1947, then the United States Navy in 1948. To Military Sea Transportation Service in 1949 as USNS Ocklawaha (T-AO-84). Laid up in 1959, scrapped in 1975.
- Opequon – Built in 1943 by Sun Shipbuilding & Drydock Co., Chester, Pennsylvania for the United States War Shipping Administration, Philadelphia, Pennsylvania. To Panama Oceanic Lines Inc, Panama in 1947. Renamed World Trust in 1956. Rebuilt at 12,839 GRT bulk carrier in 1962, renamed World Charm in 1963. To Continental Oceanic Navigation Corporation, Monrovia, Liberia in 1966, renamed Florence. To Waywater Navigation Corp, Kaohsiung, Taiwan in 1969. Scrapped at Kaohsiung in 1979.
- Orchard Knob – Built in 1945 by Sun Shipbuilding & Drydock Co, Chester for the United States War Shipping Administration, Philadelphia. To Moller Line Ltd, London, United Kingdom in 1947, renamed Gladys Moller. To Gestioni Esercizio Navi Sicilia, Palermo, Italy in 1951, renamed Maria Letizia G. Scrapped at Vado Ligure, Italy in 1962.
- Oregon Trail – Built in 1943 by Kaiser Company, Portland for the United States War Shipping Administration, Portland. To Union Sulphur Company, New York in 1948, renamed Herman F. Whiton. To Olympic Whaling Company, New York in 1950. Rebuilt as 16,433 GRT factory ship, renamed Olympic Challenger. To Kyokuyo Hogei K.K., Tokyo, Japan in 1956, renamed Kyokuyo Maru No. 2. To Ocean Green Service Co, Osaka, Japan in 1974, renamed Ocean Green. Scrapped at Masan, South Korean in 1975.
- Owyhee – Built in 1943 by Kaiser Company, Portland for the United States War Shipping Administration, Portland. To American Overseas Tanker Corp, Panama in 1948. To World Treaty Corp, Monrovia in 1956, renamed World Treaty then to Achilles Shipping Co, Piraeus, Greece later that year. Rebuilt as 12,846 GRT bulk carrier in 1961, renamed World Charity. To Continental Oceanic Corp, Monrovia in 1966, renamed Barbara. Scrapped at Kaohsiung in 1975.

== P ==
- Palo Alto – Built in 1943 by Sun Shipbuilding & Drydock Co., Chester, Pennsylvania for the United States War Shipping Administration, Philadelphia, Pennsylvania. To Sun Oil Company, Philadelphia in 1948, renamed Louisiana Sun. To Oceanic Sulphur Carriers Inc, New York in 1961. Rebuilt as 9,987 GRT molten sulphur carrier, renamed Louisiana Sulphur. To Freeport Sulphur Co, New Orleans, Louisiana, used as a barge. To River Marine Contractors Inc, New Orleans in 1991. Renamed Marine Carrier II in 1992, American Gulf VII in 1993 and Cov Zeus in 2005.
- Palo Duro – Built in 1945 by Alabama Drydock and Shipbuilding Company, Mobile, Alabama for the United States War Shipping Administration, Mobile. To Anglo-Saxon Petroleum, London, England in 1947, renamed Theliconus. To Shell Petroleum, London in 1955. To Shell Tankers Ltd, London in 1960. Scrapped at Blyth, Northumberland, United Kingdom in 1961.
- Paloma Hills – Built in 1945 by Marinship, Sausalito, California for the United States War Shipping Administration, San Francisco, California. To Deep Sea Tankers Ltd, Montreal, Quebec, Canada in 1948. Scrapped at Hirao, Japan in 1961.

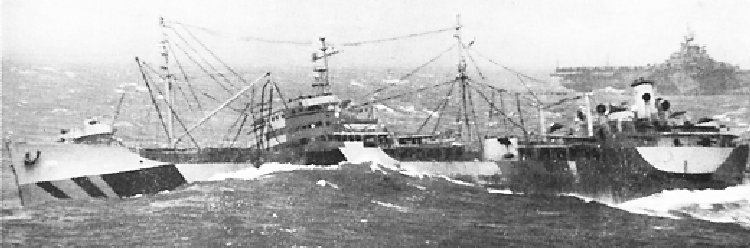
USS Pamanset.

- Pamanset (T2-SE-A2 design) – Built in 1943 by Marinship, Sausalito. To United States Navy, commissioned in 1944 as USS Pamanset (AO-85). To United States Maritime Commission in 1946. To United States Navy in 1948, then to Military Sea Transportation Service in 1949 as USNS Pamanset (T-AO-85). To United States Maritime Administration in 1956 but returned to Military Sea Transportation Service later that year. To United States Maritime Administration in 1957. To Hudson Waterways Corporation, New York in 1966. Rebuilt incorporating mid-section from Fruitvale Hills to form 8,043 GRT vehicle carrier. Renamed Seatrain Florida. Laid up in 1974. Renamed Florida in 1978. Scrapped at Kaohsiung in 1986.
- Paoli – Built in 1944 by Sun Shipbuilding & Drydock Co., Chester, Pennsylvania for the United States War Shipping Administration, Philadelphia. To Cities Service Oil Company, New York in 1947. To United States Department of Commerce, New York in 1955. To Military Sea Transportation Service in 1956 as USN Paoli (T-AO-157). To United States Department of Commerce in 1957. Rebuilt in 1966 as 11,149 GRT molten sulphur carrier. To Marine Navigation Sulphur Carriers Inc, Wilmington, Delaware in 1967, renamed Marine Floridian. Renamed Belofin Floridian in 1997. Scrapped that year at Alang, India.
- Paulus Hook – Built in 1944 by Alabama Drydock & Shipbuilding Company, Mobile for the United States War Shipping Administration, Mobile. To Overseas Tankship Corp, Panama in 1947. To Overseas Tankship (UK) Ltd, London in 1952, renamed Caltex Wellington. To Texaco Overseas Tankship Ltd, London in 1968. Rebuilt to 13,887 GRT, renamed Texaco Wellington. Scrapped at Kaohsiung in 1982.
- Pawnee Rock – Built in 1945 by Alabama Drydock & Shipbuilding Company, Mobile for the United States War Shipping Administration, Mobile. To Overseas Tankship Corp, Panama in 1947. To Overseas Tankship (UK) Ltd, London in 1952, renamed Caltex Dublin. Scrapped at Onomichi, Japan in 1965.

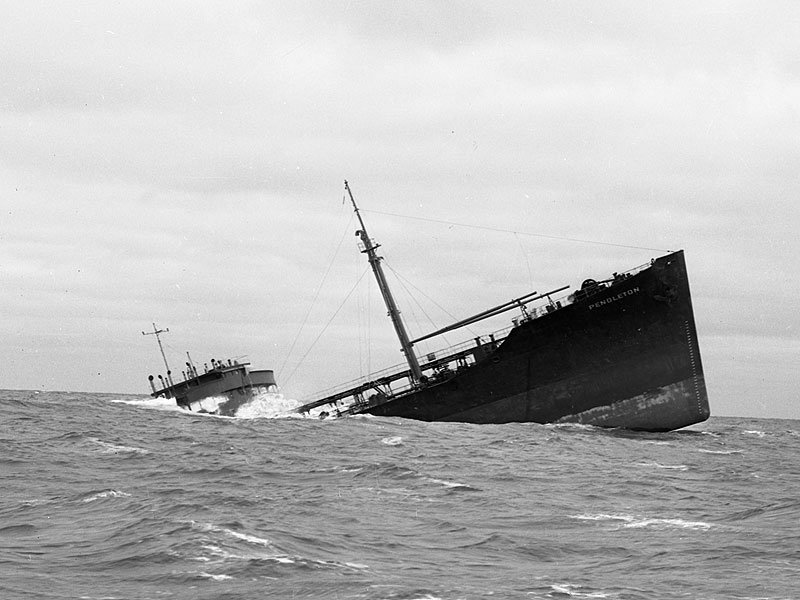
Wreck of Pendleton.

- Pendleton – Built in 1944 by Kaiser Company, Portland, Oregon for the United States War Shipping Administration, Portland. To National Bulk Carriers Inc, Wilmington in 1948. Broke in two in the Atlantic Ocean off Chatham, Massachusetts on 18 February 1952. Declared a total loss. Pendleton's Sinking is memorialized in The Finest Hours (2016) http://www.historyvshollywood.com/reelfaces/finest-hours/
- Pequot Hill – Built in 1943 by Kaiser Company, Portland for the United States War Shipping Administration, Portland. To Moore-McCormack Lines, Inc., New York in 1948, renamed Mormackfuel. To Cleveland Transport Corp, New York in 1965, renamed Cleveland. Scrapped at Split, Yugoslavia in 1971.
- Perote – Built in 1943 by Sun Shipbuilding & Drydock Co., Chester, Pennsylvania for the United States War Shipping Administration, Philadelphia. To Charles Kurz & Co, Wilmington in 1947. To Calendar Navigation Corp, Monrovia, Liberia in 1955, renamed Febcal. To Charles Kurz & Co, Wilmington in 1960, renamed Perote. Ran aground on a reef off the Isla de Enmedio, Mexico on 18 January 1964 whilst under to Veracruz, Mexico for scrapping.
- Perryville – Built in 1943 by Sun Shipbuilding & Drydock Co., Chester, Pennsylvania for Paco Tankers Inc, Wilmington. To Keystone Shipping Company, Philadelphia in 1960. Rebuilt in 1961, now 14,445 GRT. Scrapped at Chittagong, India in 1982.
- Petersburg – Built in 1943 by Sun Shipbuilding & Drydock Co., Chester, Pennsylvania for Paco Tankers Inc, Wilmington. To Theatre Navigation Corp, Monrovia in 1956, renamed Aldine. Laid up at Orange, Texas in 1960, Scrapped at Castellón de la Plana, Spain in 1968.
- Phantom Hill – Built in 1945 by Alabama Drydock & Shipbuilding Company, Mobile for the United States War Shipping Administration, Mobile. To North American Shipping & Trading Company, New York in 1947, renamed Merrimac. To United States Department of Commerce in 1955. To Commerce Tankers Corporation, Wilmington in 1957, renamed Barbara. Rebuilt in 1963, now 15,148 GRT. To Plaza Shipping Inc, Wilmington in 1972, renamed Julie. To Navegacion Granada, Panama in 1973, renamed Mount Julie. To Compagnia Maritima Sfakia, Panama in 1975. Scrapped at Incheon, South Korea in 1976.
- Pilot Butte – Built in 1944 by Kaiser Company, Portland for the United States War Shipping Administration, Portland. To Overseas Tankship Corp, Panama in 1947. Renamed Caltex Durban in 1952. Scrapped at Etajima, Japan in 1966.
- Pine Bluff – Built in 1944 by Sun Shipbuilding & Drydock Co., Chester, Pennsylvania for the United States War Shipping Administration, Philadelphia. To Overseas Tankship Corp, Panama in 1947. To Overseas Tankship (UK) Ltd, London in 1951, renamed Caltex Singapore. Scrapped at Osaka, Japan in 1963.
- Pine Ridge – Built in 1943 by Alabama Drydock & Shipbuilding Company, Mobile for the United States War Shipping Administration, Mobile. To Independent Tankships Inc, Wilmington in 1948. To Paco Tankers Inc, Wilmington in 1955. Broke in two 100 nautical miles (190 km) east of Cape Hatteras, North Carolina on 1 December 1960, bow section sank. Rebuilt with bow section from Redstone, now 15,671 GRT. To Charles Kurz & Co, Wilmington in 1962, renamed Meadowbrook. Scrapped at Kaohsiung in 1983.
- Pinnacles – Built in 1944 by Kaiser Company, Portland for the United States War Shipping Administration, Portland. To Deep Sea Tankers Ltd, Montreal, Quebec, Canada in 1948. To Antilles Shipping Co, Monrovia in 1961. Rebuilt as 12,963 GRT chemical tanker, renamed Alchemist. To Antilles Steamship Co, Monrovia in 1967. Scrapped at San Juan de Nieva, Spain in 1982.
- Pioneer Valley – Built in 1944 by Kaiser Company, Portland for the United States War Shipping Administration, Portland. To Soviet Union, renamed Krasnaya Armiya. To United States Maritime Commission in 1948, renamed Pioneer Valley then to United States Navy as USS Pioneer Valley (AO-140). To Military Sea Transportation Service in 1949 as USNS Pioneer Valley (T-AO-140). To United States Department of Commerce in 1960 but returned to Military Sea Transportation Service in 1961. To United States Department of Commerce in 1971. Scrapped at Baltimore, Maryland in 1972.
- Pipe Spring – Built in 1944 by Kaiser Company, Portland for the United States War Shipping Administration, Portland. To Overseas Tankship Corp, Panama in 1947. Renamed Caltex Athens in 1952. Scrapped at Hong Kong in 1963.
- Piqua – Built in 1945 by Alabama Drydock & Shipbuilding Company, Mobile for the United States War Shipping Administration, Mobile. To Pan-American Petroleum & Transport Company, Wilmington in 1946, renamed Pan-Pennsylvania. To American Oil Company, Baltimore in 1954. Renamed Amoco Pennsylvania in 1955. To Carib Marine Co, Monrovia in 1957, renamed Carma Zulia. To American Oil Co, Monrovia in 1962. Scrapped at Bilbao, Spain in 1964.
- Pit River – Built in 1945 by Alabama Drydock & Shipbuilding Company, Mobile for the United States War Shipping Administration, Mobile. To North American Shipping & Trading Company, New York in 1947, renamed Memory. To United States Department of Commerce, New York in 1955. To Pan Cargo Shipping Corporation, New York in 1957, renamed National Peace. Ran aground on Kiltan Island, India on 11 August 1959. Refloated in 1962, scrapped at Bombay, India in 1963.
- Platt Park – Built in 1945 by Kaiser Company, Portland for the United States War Shipping Administration, Portland. To Overseas Tankship Corp, Panama in 1948. Renamed Caltex Gothenburg in 1952. Scrapped at Kaohsiung in 1962.
- Platte Bridge – Built in 1944 by Alabama Drydock & Shipbuilding Company, Mobile for the United States War Shipping Administration, Mobile. To Southern Trading Company, Wilmington in 1947, renamed Atlantic Shipper. To Webb & Knapp Inc, Wilmington in 1953. To Ozark Navigation Corporation, New York in 1955, renamed Wang Buccaneer. Renamed Ozark in 1959. To Wall Street Traders Inc, New York in 1960, renamed Glenbrook. Reflagged to Liberia in 1964. Scrapped at Cádiz, Spain in 1966.
- Plattsburg – Built in 1943 by Kaiser Company, Portland for the United States War Shipping Administration, Portland. To Garibaldi Società Cooperative di Navigazione, Genoa, Italy in 1947, renamed Andrea Costa. Scrapped at La Spezia, Italy in 1965.
- Pocket Canyon – Built in 1944 by Alabama Drydock & Shipbuilding Company, Mobile for the United States War Shipping Administration, Mobile. To Southern Trading Company, Wilmington in 1947, renamed Atlantic Producer. To Webb & Knapp Inc, Wilmington in 1953. To Marine Carriers Corporation, New York in 1957, renamed Producer. Rebuilt as bulk carrier in 1961. To American Rice Steamship Company, New York in 1972, renamed American Rice. To Sonana Steamship Co, Panama in 1974, renamed Termini. Scrapped at Kaohsiung that year.
- Point Pleasant – Built in 1944 by Sun Shipbuilding & Drydock Co., Chester, Pennsylvania for the United States War Shipping Administration, Philadelphia. To Sun Oil Company, Philadelphia in 1946, renamed Mercury Sun. To Oil Transport Inc, Wilmington in 1960, renamed Alaskan. To American Trading & Production Corporation, Wilmington in 1965, renamed Baltimore Trader. Scrapped at Kaohsiung in 1969.

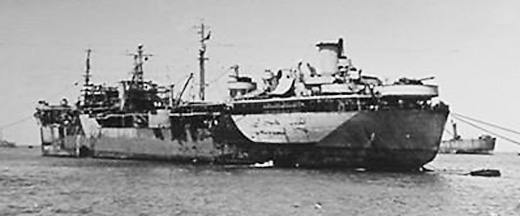
USS Ponganset.

- USS Ponaganset (T2-SE-A2 design) – Built in 1943 by Marinship, Sausalito. To United States Navy, commissioned in 1944 as USS Ponaganset (AO-86). To United States Maritime Commission in 1947. Broke in two at Boston, Massachusetts. Returned to United States Navy in 1948, not repaired and returned to United States Maritime Commission later that year. Scrapped in 1949.
- Port Republic – Built in 1945 by Sun Shipbuilding & Drydock Co., Chester, Pennsylvania for the United States War Shipping Administration, Philadelphia. To American Trading & Production Corporation, Wilmington in 1947, renamed Baltimore Trader. To Sea Land Service Inc, Wilmington in 1961, laid up at Mobile. Rebuilt in 1967 with bow section from Isanda, now 19,307 GRT. To Vancor Steamship Corporation, New York in 1968, renamed Vantage Horizon. To Point Endeavour Corporation, New York in 1978, renamed Point Margo. Scrapped at Gadani Beach, Pakistan in 1983.
- Port Royal – Built in 1944 by Sun Shipbuilding & Drydock Co., Chester, Pennsylvania for the United States War Shipping Administration, Philadelphia. To Imperial Oil Shipping Co, Montreal in 1947, renamed Imperial Quebec. To Ditta Luigi Pittaluga Vapori, Genoa in 1954, renamed Verbania. To Achille Lauro fu Gioacchino, Naples in 1961. Scrapped at La Spezia in 1966.
- Potrero Hills – Built in 1945 by Marinship, Sausalito for the United States War Shipping Administration, San Francisco. To Nautilus Shipping Corporation, New York in 1948, renamed Captain John D. P.. To Philadelphia Marine Corporation, New York in 1951, renamed Potrero Hills. To Pan-Atlantic Steamship Corporation, New York in 1955, fitted to carry containers, renamed Ideal X. To Oceanic Petroleum Carriers Inc, Wilmington in 1959, renamed Elemir. Scrapped at Hirao in 1964.
- Powder River – Built in 1943 by Alabama Drydock & Shipbuilding Company, Mobile for the United States War Shipping Administration, Mobile. To Independent Tankships Inc, Wilmington in 1948. To Hess Tankships Company, Wilmington in 1955, renamed Hess Bunker. Rebuilt in 1961, now 14,126 GRT. To Kingston Shipping Company, Wilmington in 1977, renamed Bunker then Capricorn. Scrapped at Kaohsiung in 1984.
- Prairie Grove – Built in 1944 by Sun Shipbuilding & Drydock Co., Chester, Pennsylvania for the United States War Shipping Administration, Philadelphia. To Standard Oil of New Jersey, Wilmington in 1947, renamed Esso Linden. To Esso Shipping Company, Wilmington in 1950. To Humble Oil Company, Wilmington in 1960. To Maryland Shipbuilding and Drydock Company in 1961, rebuilt to 15,462 GRT and renamed Prairie Grove. To Mathiasen's Tanker Industries Inc, Wilmington in 1962. To Sabine Towing & Transportation Company, Baltimore in 1975, renamed San Jacinto. Scrapped at Kaohsiung in 1984.

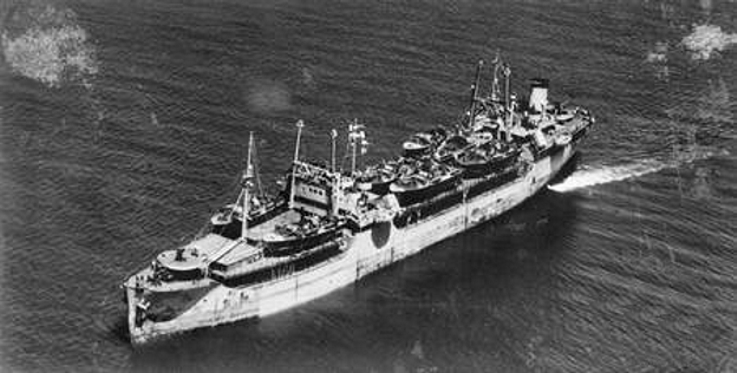
Esso Manhattan.

- Princeton – Built in 1942 by Sun Shipbuilding Co, Chester for Standard Oil Company of New Jersey, Wilmington. Renamed Esso Manhattan later that year. Broke in two off New York on 29 March 1943, Subsequently, repaired. To Esso Shipping Company, Wilmington in 1950. To Gulfcoast Transit Company, Tampa, Florida in 1959. Converted to bulk carrier, now 9,870 GRT, renamed Martha Mac. To Marine Navigation Company, Wilmington in 1965, renamed Marine Progress; renamed Marine Enterprize in 1966. Reflagged to Panama in 1970 and renamed Progress. Scrapped at Hualien City, Taiwan in 1974.
- Pueblo – Built in 1943 by Sun Shipbuilding & Drydock Co., Chester, Pennsylvania for the United States War Shipping Administration, Philadelphia. To Colonial Navigation Company, New York in 1948. To Keystone Shipping Company, Philadelphia in 1954. To Paco Tankers Inc, Wilmington in 1960. To Western Marine Industries, Monrovia in 1965, converted to 10,713 GRT dredging tender, renamed Western Pueblo. Scrapped at Kaohsiung in 1969.
- Puente Hills – Built in 1943 by Marinship, Sausalito for the United States War Shipping Administration, San Francisco. To J. M. Carras Inc, Wilmington in 1948, renamed Michael. To Mayflower Steamship Corporation, Wilmington in 1961. Scrapped at Trieste in 1962.
- Pulpit Rock – Built in 1943 by Kaiser Company, Portland for the United States War Shipping Administration, Portland. To Giovanni B. Bibolini, Genoa in 1948, renamed Elia B. To Tanklerflotta Società di Navigazione, Palermo, Italy in 1954, renamed Elia Biblioni. Scrapped at La Spezia in 1962.

== Q ==
- Quaker Hill – Built in 1945 by Alabama Drydock and Shipbuilding Company, Mobile, Alabama for the United States War Shipping Administration, Mobile. To Overseas Tankship Corp, Panama in 1947. Renamed Caltex Karachi in 1951. To Overseas Tankship (UK) Ltd, London, United Kingdom in 1952. Scrapped at Kaohsiung, Taiwan in 1966.
- Quebec – Built in 1943 by Kaiser Company, Portland, Oregon for the United States War Shipping Administration, Portland. To Fratelli d'Amico, Rome, Italy in 1947, renamed Mariacristina D. Scrapped at Trieste, Italy in 1966.
- Queenstown Heights – Built in 1943 by Kaiser Company, Portland for the United States War Shipping Administration, Portland. To American Eastern Corporation, New York in 1948. To Seatrade Corporation, New York in 1949. To Prometheus Shipping Corp, Monrovia, Liberia in 1957, renamed Prometheus. Scrapped at Faslane, Dunbartonshire, United Kingdom in 1960.
- Quemado Lake – Built in 1943 Alabama Drydock and Shipbuilding Company, Mobile, Alabama for the United States War Shipping Administration, Mobile. To Independent Tankships Inc, Wilmington, Delaware in 1948. To Charles Kurz & Co Inc, Wilmington in 1955. To Calendar Navigation Corp, Monrovia in 1956, renamed Marchcal. Rebuilt in 1958, now 12,691 GRT. To Charles Kurz & Co Inc, Wilmington in 1959, renamed Naeco. Scrapped at Kaohsiung in 1966.

== R ==
- Ranier – – Built in 1945 by Kaiser Company, Portland, Oregon for the United States War Shipping Administration, Portland. To the French Government, Dunkerque in 1948, renamed Ardeshir. Renamed Langeais in 1954. To Société Maritime des Petroles BP, Dunkerque in 1955. To Crestview Shipping Co, Monrovia, Liberia in 1956, renamed Caribbean Wave. Rebuilt as 14,130 GRT bulk carrier in 1963, renamed Papadiamandis. Wrecked off the Azores on 22 December 1965.
- Raton Pass – Built in 1945 by Alabama Drydock and Shipbuilding Company, Mobile, Alabama for the United States War Shipping Administration, Mobile. To Gulf Oil Corporation, Philadelphia, Pennsylvania in 1948, renamed Gulfpass. To Afran Transport Corp, Monrovia in 1965, renamed Mona Pass. Scrapped at Kaohsiung, Taiwan in 1973.
- Red Bank – Built in 1944 by Alabama Drydock and Shipbuilding Company, Mobile for the United States War Shipping Administration, Mobile. To British Tanker Company, London, United Kingdom in 1948. To BP Tanker Co, London in 1956. To Christiania Portland Cementfabrik A/S, Oslo, Norway in 1959, renamed Bank. Scrapped at La Spezia, Italy in 1960.
- Red Canyon – Built in 1943 by Alabama Drydock and Shipbuilding Company, Mobile for the United States War Shipping Administration, Mobile. To Independent Tankships Inc, Wilmington, Delaware in 1948 then Allied-Ashland Tankers Inc, Wilmington later that year. To Hess Tankships Inc, Wilmington in 1956, renamed Hess Voyager. To Timbo Shipping Ltd, Monrovia in 1963, renamed Timbo. Rebuilt to 15,794 GRT. Scrapped at Alang, India in 1993.
- Redstone – Built in 1945 by Sun Shipbuilding & Drydock Co., Chester, Pennsylvania for the United States War Shipping Administration, Philadelphia, Pennsylvania. To Trinidad Corporation, Wilmington in 1947. To Pocahontas Steamship Corporation, Wilmington in 1958, renamed Consolidation Coal. Rebuilt with new bow section to form 16,304 GRT bulk carrier. Bow section from Redstone fitted to stern section of Pine Ridge in 1962. To Freighters Inc, Wilmington in 1969, renamed Lumber Queen. Renamed American Wheat in 1972. To American Bear Steamship Company, Wilmington in 1975, renamed America Bear then American Bear later that year. To Point Venture Corporation, New York in 1977, renamed Point Susan. Scrapped at Gadani Beach, Pakistan in 1984.
- Rich Mountain – Built in 1944 by Sun Shipbuilding & Drydock Co., Chester, Pennsylvania for the United States War Shipping Administration, Philadelphia. To Tide Water Associated Oil Company, Wilmington in 1947, renamed Frank Haskell. To United States Shipping Corporation, Wilmington in 1963, renamed Marine. Scrapped at Hong Kong in 1965.
- Ridgefield – Built in 1944 by Sun Shipbuilding & Drydock Co., Chester, Pennsylvania for the United States War Shipping Administration, Philadelphia. To Anglo-American Oil Company, London in 1947, renamed Esso Purfleet. To Esso Petroleum Co, London in 1951. Scrapped at Antwerp, Belgium in 1963.
- Rincon Hills – Built in 1944 by Marinship, Sausalito, California for the United States War Shipping Administration, San Francisco, California. To Deep Sea Tankers Ltd, Montreal, Quebec, Canada in 1948. Scrapped at Osaka, Japan in 1961.
- River Raisin – Built in 1943 by Kaiser Company, Portland for the United States War Shipping Administration, Portland. To Coastal Oil Company, Newark, New Jersey in 1948, renamed Rosina Marron. To Yarmouth Steamship Company, New York in 1954, renamed Aeolus. To San Rafael Compagnia Navigacion, Monrovia in 1957, renamed Andros Sparrow. To Transpollux Carriers Corp, Monrovia in 1959, renamed Valiant Warhead. To Compagnia Naviera Bahia S.A., Monrovia in 1960, renamed Transarctic. Scrapped at Kaohsiung in 1963.
- Rock Landing – Built in 1945 by Alabama Drydock and Shipbuilding Company, Mobile for the United States War Shipping Administration, Mobile. To California Oil Company, Wilmington in 1947. To California Tanker Company, Wilmington in 1952. To Standard Oil of California, San Francisco in 1962, renamed Hawaii Standard. Renamed Nevada Standard in 1972. Scrapped at Kaohsiung in 1977.
- Rogue River – Built in 1944 by Alabama Drydock and Shipbuilding Company, Mobile for the United States War Shipping Administration, Mobile. To British Tanker Co, London in 1947. To BP Tanker Co, London in 1956. To A/S Gerrards Rederi II, Kristiansand, Norway in 1957. Renamed Hunsfos, used as a floating power plant. To Skibs A/S Abu, Oslo in 1960, renamed Apache. Rebuilt in 1962 to 15,781 GRT bulk carrier. To Philippine Pacific Shipping Co, Panama in 1968, renamed Pacmerchant. Scrapped at Kaohsiung in 1977.
- Rosebud – Built in 194 by Alabama Drydock and Shipbuilding Company, Mobile for the United States War Shipping Administration, Mobile. To Perseveranza Società di Navigazione, Messina, Italy in 1948, renamed Arizona. To Ditta Andrea Zanchi, Genoa, Italy in 1956, renamed Andrea Zanchi. To Compagnia di Navigazione Capo Gallo, Messina in 1963, renamed Capo Andrea. Scrapped at La Spezia in 1977.
- Roxbury Hill – Built in 1945 by Sun Shipbuilding & Drydock Co., Chester, Pennsylvania for the United States War Shipping Administration, Philadelphia. To Gulf Oil Corporation, Philadelphia in 1946, renamed Gulfhorn in 1947. To Blackships Inc, Wilmington in 1958. Rebuilt to 12,668 GRT and renamed Gulftiger. To Steamship Co. Suzanne Inc, Los Angeles, California in 1981, renamed Suzanne. Scrapped at Kaohsiung in 1985.
- Royal Oak – Built in 1945 by Sun Shipbuilding & Drydock Co., Chester, Pennsylvania for the United States War Shipping Administration, Philadelphia. To Cities Service Oil Company, New York in 1947. To Hudson Waterways Corporation, New York in 1962, renamed Transbay. Rebuilt in 1966 with mid-section of USS Passumpsic, now 11,971 GRT, renamed Transhuron. To Polk Tanker Corporation, New York in 1972. Wrecked on Kiltan Island, India on 26 September 1974.
- Rum River – Built in 1944 by Sun Shipbuilding & Drydock Co., Chester, Pennsylvania for the United States War Shipping Administration, Philadelphia. To American Trading & Production Company, Baltimore, Maryland in 1946 then to Overseas Tankship Corp, Panama later that year. To Outremer de Navigation Petrolière S.A., Bordeaux, France in 1953, renamed Caltex Bayonne. To Union Industrielle des Petroles, Bordeaux in 1961. Laid up in 1963. To Société Petromer, Bordeaux in 1966, renamed Petro. Scrapped at Vinaròs, Spain in 1968.
- Rye Cove – Built in 1945 by Sun Shipbuilding & Drydock Co., Chester, Pennsylvania for the United States War Shipping Administration, Philadelphia. To Anthony Radcliffe Steamship Co, London in 1947, renamed Llanishen. To Caribbean Shipping Corp, Monrovia in 1956, renamed Anna O. Scrapped at Castellón de la Plana, Spain in 1963.

== S ==
- Sackett's Harbor – Built in 1943 by Kaiser Company, Portland, Oregon for the United States War Shipping Administration, Portland. Broke in two 800 nautical miles (1,500 km) south west of Adak Island, Alaska on 1 March 1946. Bow section sunk, stern section reached Adak Island under its own power. Used as a floating power station. Rebuilt in 1957 as a 8,521 GRT wine carrier. To United Vintners Inc, San Francisco, California, renamed Angelo Petri. Renamed Californian in 1970. To Antilles Navegacion S.A., Panama in 1975. renamed Sea Chemist. Scrapped at Vinaròs, Spain in 1978.
- Sag Harbor – Built in 1944 by Sun Shipbuilding & Drydock Co., Chester, Pennsylvania for the United States War Shipping Administration, Philadelphia, Pennsylvania. To Standard Oil of New Jersey, Wilmington, Delaware in 1945, renamed Esso Portsmouth. To Imperial Oil Shipping Co, Halifax, Nova Scotia, Canada in 1948, renamed Imperial Charlottetown. To Ocean Marine Ltd, Monrovia, Liberia in 1954, renamed San Juan. Rebuilt to 11,876 GRT bulk carrier in 1961, renamed Gold Star. To Reading Shipping Corp, Monrovia in 1971, renamed Calypso. Scrapped at Bilbao, Spain in 1974.
- Saguaro – Built in 1945 by Kaiser Company, Portland for the United States War Shipping Administration, Portland. To Lanmore Co Inc, Panama in 1947 then Panama Transoceanic Co, Panama in 1948. Rebuilt in 1960, now 14,449 GRT, renamed Edna M. Conway. Scrapped at Kaohsiung, Taiwan in 1976.
- Saint Mihiel – Built in 1945 by Sun Shipbuilding & Drydock Co., Chester for the United States War Shipping Administration, Philadelphia. Collided with Nashbulk in the Atlantic Ocean on 9 April 1945 and burnt out. Renamed Camp Verde in 1946. Scrapped that year at Perth Amboy, New Jersey.
- Salem Maritime – Built in 1945 by Kaiser Company, Portland for the United States War Shipping Administration, Portland. To Cities Service Oil Company, New York in 1948. Exploded and burnt out at Lake Charles, Louisiana on 17 January 1956, rebuilt in 1957 to 12,584 GRT. To Red Hills Corporation, Wilmington in 1958, renamed Gold Stream. To Mathiasen's Tanker Industries, Wilmington in 1963 then to the United States Department of Commerce later that year. To Penntrans Company, Wilmington in 1964, renamed Penn Sailor. To Carrier Shipping Co, Panama in 1971, renamed Navigator. Scrapped at Kaohsiung in 1973.
- Salmon Falls – Built in 1945 by Sun Shipbuilding & Drydock Co., Chester for the United States War Shipping Administration, Philadelphia. To Standard American Petroleum Co, Antwerp, Belgium in 1947, renamed Esso Brussels. To Esso Standard (Belgium) S.A., Antwerp in 1949. To Sicilarma Società di Navigazione per Azioni, Palermo, Italy in 1955, renamed Cerere. Scrapped at La Spezia, Italy in 1966.
- San Antonio – Built in 1945 by Sun Shipbuilding & Drydock Co., Chester for the United States War Shipping Administration, Philadelphia. To Gulf Oil Corporation, Philadelphia in 1947, renamed Gulfdawn. To Afran Transport Co, Monrovia in 1958, renamed Panarica Gulf. To Oswego Bulk Carriers Inc, Monrovia in 1959, renamed Oswego Leader. Scrapped at Kaohsiung in 1966.
- Sandy Creek – Built in 1944 by Sun Shipbuilding & Drydock Co., Chester for the United States War Shipping Administration, Philadelphia. To Anglo-American Oil Company, London in 1946, renamed Esso Bristol. To Esso Petroleum Co, London in 1950. To Diana Compagnia Naviers, Monrovia in 1954, renamed North Duke. To Sicula Oceana S.A., Palermo in 1955, renamed Perseo. Scrapped at Vado Ligure, Italy in 1963.
- Sandy Lake – Built in 1945 by Alabama Drydock and Shipbuilding Company, Mobile for the United States War Shipping Administration, Mobile. To French Government in 1947, renamed Berre then Prairial. To Société des Transports Maritimes Petroliers, Rouen in 1955. To Society Pacifica Marina, Monrovia in 1959, renamed Segovia. To Serena Shipping Ltd, Monrovia in 1965, renamed Serena. To Charles Kurz & Company, New York in 1966, renamed Sandy Lake, rebuilt to 15,959 GRT. Scrapped at Gadani Beach, Pakistan in 1977.
- San Juan Hill – Built in 1944 by Alabama Drydock and Shipbuilding Company, Mobile, Alabama for the United States War Shipping Administration, Mobile. To North American Shipping and Trading Corporation, New York in 1948, renamed Monitor. To United States Department of Commerce in 1955. To North American Shipping and Trading Corporation, New York in 1957, renamed Washington Trader. Rebuilt in 1965, midship section replaced with that from Mission San Fernando. Scrapped at Kaohsiung in 1973.
- San Pasqual – Built in 1944 by Sun Shipbuilding & Drydock Co., Chester for the United States War Shipping Administration, Philadelphia. To The Texas Company, Wilmington in 1947, renamed Illinois. Renamed Texaco Illinois in 1960. Rebuilt to 14,324 GRT in 1961. To Birch Shipping Corporation, New York in 1976, renamed Point Julie. Scrapped at Gadani Beach in 1981.
- Santa Fe Hills – Built in 1945 by Marinship, Sausalito, California for the United States War Shipping Administration, San Francisco. To Petroleum Industrie Maatschappij N.V., The Hague, Netherlands in 1948, renamed Esso Amsterdam. To Esso Tankvaart Maatschappij, N.V., The Hague in 1958. To I/S Moelv, Oslo, Norway in 1959, renamed Moelv. Scrapped at Blyth, Northumberland, United Kingdom in 1960.
- Santa Maria Hills – Built in 1945 by Marinship, Sausalito for the United States War Shipping Administration, San Francisco. To Victor Jensens Rederi A/S, Oslo in 1948, renamed Mylla. To Compagnia Naviera Transmundo S.A., Monrovia in 1959, renamed Transmundo. To Gotaas-Larsen S.r.l., Buenos Aires, Argentina in 1961, rebuilt as 10,680 GRT bulk carrier and renamed Martin Fierro. To Alianza Naviera Argentina S.A, Buenos Aires in 1978. Scrapped at Ramallo, Argentina in 1983.
- Santa Paula – Built in 1945 by Sun Shipbuilding & Drydock Co., Chester for Union Oil of California, Los Angeles, California. To Sabine Transportation Co, Baltimore, Maryland in 1955, renamed Brazos. Rebuilt to 11,867 GRT in 1958 and 13,903 GRT in 1967. To United States Department of Transportation in 1983 and laid up. Scrapped at Tuxpam, Mexico in 1991.
- Santiago – Built in 1944 by Sun Shipbuilding & Drydock Co., Chester for the United States War Shipping Administration, Philadelphia. To Anglo-American Oil Co, London in 1947, renamed Esso Manchester. To Esso Petroleum Co, London in 1951. Scrapped at Faslane, Dunbartonshire, United Kingdom in 1963.
- Sappa Creek – Built in 1943 by Alabama Drydock and Shipbuilding Company, Mobile, Alabama for the United States War Shipping Administration, Mobile. To United States Navy in 1948, commissioned as USS Sappa Creel (AO-141). To Military Sea Transportation Service in 1949 at USNS Sappa Creek (T-AO-141). To United States Department of Commerce in 1951. Scrapped at Terminal Island, California in 1975.

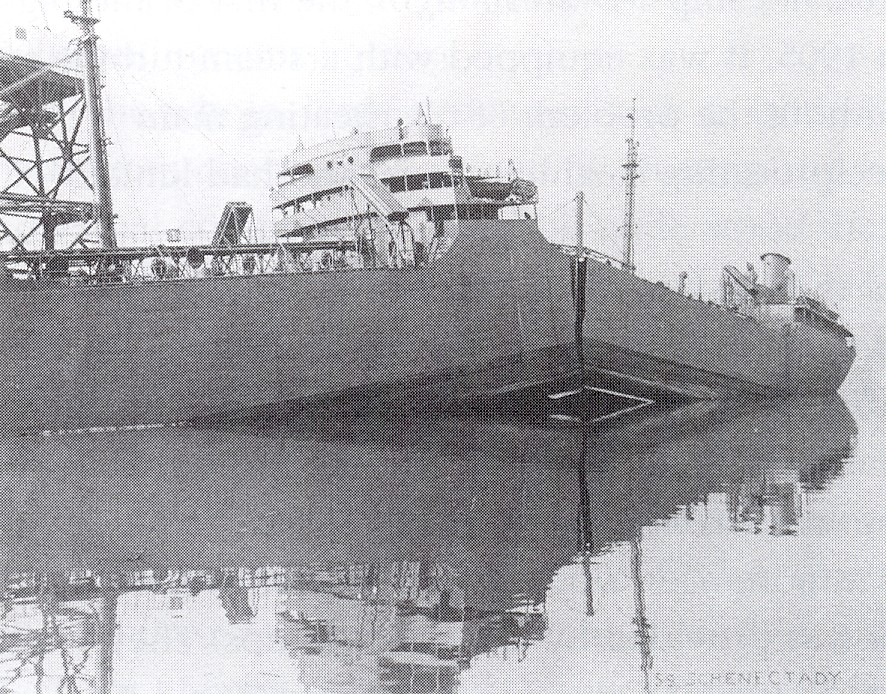
Schenectady.

- Schenectady – Built in 1942 by Kaiser Company, Portland for the United States War Shipping Administration, Portland. Broke in two at Portland on 16 January 1943, subsequently repaired. To D. Tripcovich, Venice, Italy in 1948, renamed Diadoto Tripcovich. Scrapped at Trieste, Italy in 1961.
- Scotts Bluff – Built in 1944 by Kaiser Company, Portland for the United States War Shipping Administration, Portland. To the French Government, Le Havre in 1948, renamed Orcher. To Compagnie Navale des Petroles, Le Havre in 1956. To Superior Shipping Co, Monrovia in 1963, renamed Patricia D. Renamed Lake Katrina in 1966. Scrapped at Kaohsiung in 1968. Named after Scotts Bluff National Monument located near Scottsbluff, Nebraska.

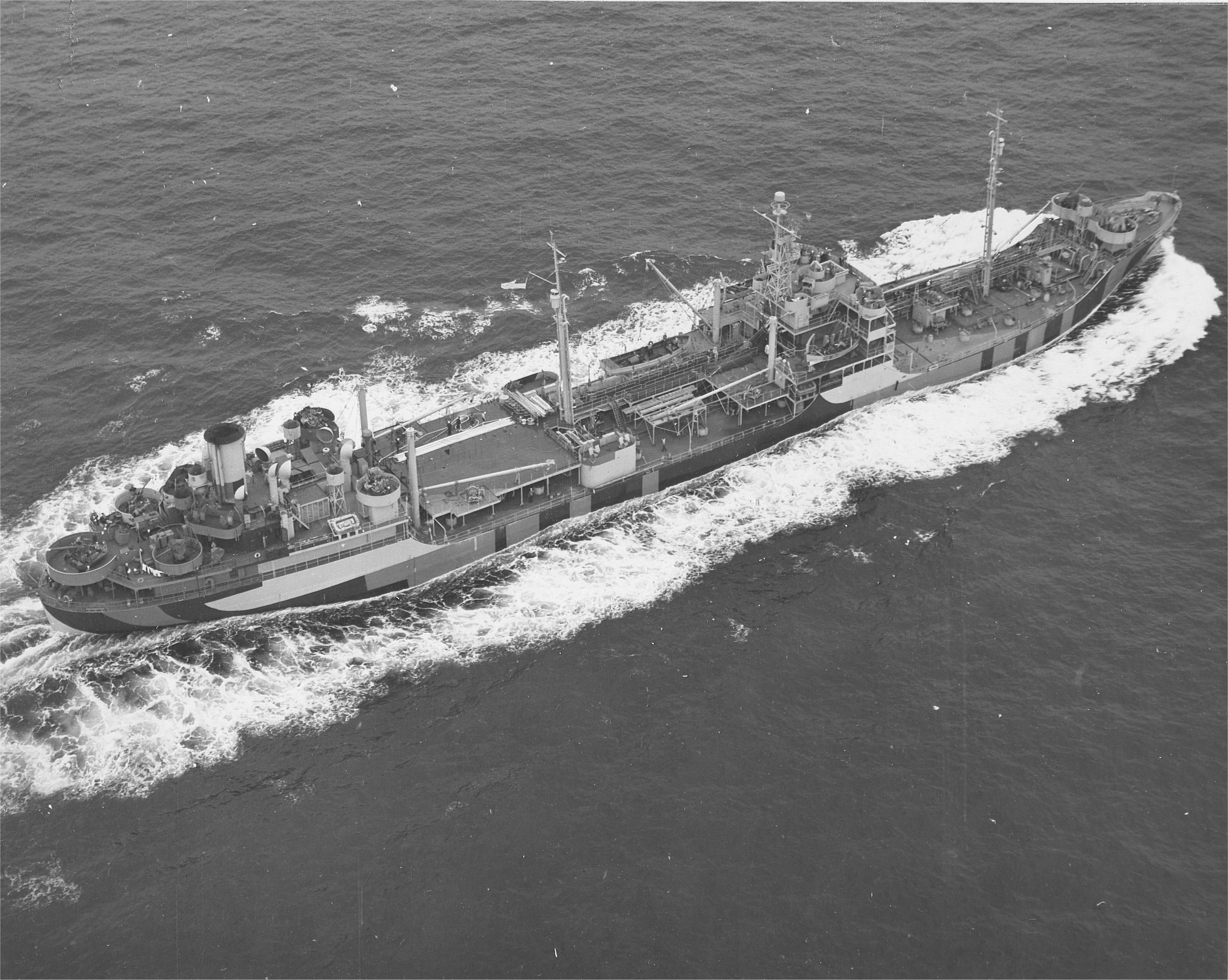
USS Sebec.

- Sebec (T2-SE-A2 design) – Built in 1943 by Kaiser Company. To United States Navy, commissioned as USS Sebec AO-87). To United States Maritime Administration in 1946. To Military Sea Transport Service in 1950 as USNS Sebec (T-AO-87). To United States Maritime Commission in 1955 but returned to Military Sea Transport Service in 1956. To United States Maritime Administration in 1957. To United States Army in 1966, converted to floating power station for use in Vietnam. Scrapped at Seoul, South Korea in 1974.
- Sedan – Built in 1945 by Sun Shipbuilding & Drydock Co., Chester for the United States War Shipping Administration, Philadelphia. To the French Government, Le Havre in 1945, renamed Gravenchon then Esso France later that year. Renamed Esso Flandre in 1954. To Esso Standard Société Anonyme Française, Le Havre in 1956. To Lancer Shipping Co, Piraeus, Greece in 1960, rebuilt as 13,849 GRT bulk carrier, renamed Pheax. Reflagged to Liberia in 1965. To Duarf International Inc, Panama in 1976 then M.C.M. Cement Managing Corp, Panama in 1977, renamed Chios Flag. Scrapped at Barcelona, Spain in 1978.
- Seneca Castle – Built in 1945 by Alabama Drydock and Shipbuilding Company, Mobile for the United States War Shipping Administration, Mobile. To Overseas Tankship Corp, Panama in 1947. To Overseas Tankship (UK) Ltd, London in 1950. Renamed Caltex Adelaide in 1951. Scrapped at Hirao, Japan in 1962.
- Seven Pines – Built in 1943 by Sun Shipbuilding & Drydock Co., Chester for the United States War Shipping Administration, Philadelphia. To Jenney Manufacturing Company, Boston, Massachusetts in 1948, renamed Charles S. Jenney. To Commerce Tankers Corp, Wilmington in 1957, renamed Katina. To Panamerican Overseas Corporation, New York in 1959, renamed Zephyrhills. To Hudson Waterways Corporation, New York in 1966 then United States Department of Commerce in 1968. Scrapped at Kaohsiung in 1969.
- Sharpsburg – Built in 1943 by Sun Shipbuilding & Drydock Co., Chester for the United States War Shipping Administration, Philadelphia. To Achille Lauro fu Gioacchino, Naples, Italy in 1947, renamed Achille Lauro. Renamed Pozzuolli in 1964. Scrapped at Trieste in 1967.
- Shawnee Trail – Built in 1944 by Kaiser Company, Portland for the United States War Shipping Administration, Portland. To the Soviet Union, renamed Emba II. To the United States Maritime Commission, Portland in 1948, renamed Shawnee Trail. To United States Navy, commissioned as USS Shawnee Trail (AO-142). To Military Sea Transportation Service in 1949 as USNS Shawnee Trail (T-AO-142). To United States Department of Commerce in 1957. To Military Sea Transportation Service in 1965. To United States Department of Commerce in 1972. Scrapped at New York in 1973.
- Shiloh – Built in 1943 by Sun Shipbuilding & Drydock Co., Chester for the United States War Shipping Administration, Philadelphia. To Società Italiana Marittima, Rome, Italy in 1948, renamed Ramona. Scrapped at La Spezia in 1962.
- Sideling Hill – Built in 1945 by Alabama Drydock and Shipbuilding Company, Mobile for the United States War Shipping Administration, Mobile. To Overseas Tankship Corp, Panama in 1947. Renamed Caltex Rome in 1953. To Overseas Tankship (UK) Ltd, London in 1954. To Texaco Overseas Tankship Ltd, London in 1968, rebuilt to 13,892 GRT, renamed Texaco Rome. Scrapped at Kaohsiung in 1981.
- Signal Hills – Built in 1945 by Marinship, Sausalito for the United States War Shipping Administration, San Francisco. To Sabine Transportation Company, Baltimore in 1948, renamed Henry M. Dawes. Rebuilt in 1963 with mid-section from San Francisco, now 10,380 GRT, renamed Guadalupe. Rebuilt in 1978 to 17,985 GRT. Scrapped at Alang, India in 2001.
- Silver Creek – Built in 1945 by Kaiser Company, Portland for the United States War Shipping Administration, Portland. To Anglo-Saxon Petroleumo, London in 1947, renamed Theobaldius. To N.V. Petroleum Maatschappij La Corona, The Hague in 1955. To Shell Tankers, The Hague in 1960. Scrapped at Faslane in 1962.
- Silverpeak – Built in 1944 by Kaiser Company, Portland for the United States War Shipping Administration, Portland. To National Bulk Carriers Inc, Wilmington in 1948. To Zeeland Transportation Co, Monrovia in 1957, renamed Silver Hills. To American Bulk Carriers Inc, New York in 1959, rebuilt as 12,922 GRT bulk carrier and renamed Bulk Leader. To Lincoln Traders Inc, New York in 1962. To Sacramento Transport Inc, New York in 1964, renamed Sacramento. To Ogden Sacramento Transport Inc, New York in 1969. Renamed Ogden Sacramento in 1974 and reflagged to Panama. Scrapped at Kaohsiung in 1975.
- Skull Bar – Built in 1943 by Alabama Drydock and Shipbuilding Company, Mobile for the United States War Shipping Administration, Mobile. To American Viking Corporation, New York in 1948, renamed Saint Christopher. To Park Tanker Corp, Monrovia in 1956, renamed Scherzo. Scrapped at Osaka, Japan in 1963.
- Smoky Hill – Built in 1944 by Kaiser Company, Portland for the United States War Shipping Administration, Portland. To British Tanker Company, London in 1947. To BP Tanker Co, London in 1956. To Mariposa Navegacion S.A., Monrovia in 1958, renamed Mariposa II. Scrapped at Castellón de la Plana, Spain in 1965.
- Snake River – Built in 1945 by Kaiser Company, Portland for the United States War Shipping Administration, Portland. To Flanighan Loveland Shipping Co, Panama in 1947, renamed John Flanighan. To Corrientes Societa Marittima, Panama in 1951, renamed Olympic Mariner. Reflagged to Liberia in 1964 and renamed Mariner. Scrapped at Kaohsiung in 1969.
- Somme – Built in 1945 by Sun Shipbuilding & Drydock Co., Chester for the United States War Shipping Administration, Philadelphia. To Gulf Oil Company, Philadelphia in 1947, renamed Gulfshore. To Blackships Inc, Wilmington in 1957, rebuilt to 12,811 GRT and renamed Gulfbear. To Afran Transport Inc, Monrovia in 1971, renamed La Cruz. Scrapped at Brownsville, Texas in 1975.
- South Mountain – Built in 1944 by Sun Shipbuilding & Drydock Co., Chester for the Texas Company, Wilmington. Renamed Mississippi in 1950 and Texaco Mississippi in 1959. Rebuilt to 15,688 GRT in 1964. To Texaco Marketing & Refining Inc, Wilmington in 1984. Renamed Star Mississippi in 1990. To Eastern Overseas Inc in 1992. renamed Star Mist. Scrapped at Alang later that year.
- Spirit Lake – Built in 1945 by Alabama Drydock and Shipbuilding Company, Mobile for the United States War Shipping Administration, Mobile. To Standard Oil of New Jersey, Wilmington in 1948, renamed Esso Bridgeport. To Esso Shipping Co, Wilmington in 1950. To Humble Oil & Refining Company, Wilmington in 1960. To Marine Sulphur Carriers Inc, Wilmington in 1963. Rebuilt as 10,065 GRT molten sulphur carrier and renamed Marine Texan. Scrapped at Kaohsiung in 1988.
- Spottsylvania – Built in 1943 by Sun Shipbuilding & Drydock Co., Chester for Gulf Oil Corporation, Philadelphia. Renamed Gulftrade in 1947. To Seatrad Corporation, New York in 1960, renamed Orient Point. Scrapped at Osaka in 1961.
- Spring Hill – Built in 1944 by Sun Shipbuilding & Drydock Co., Chester for the United States War Shipping Administration, Philadelphia. To Gulf Oil Corporation, Philadelphia in 1947, renamed Gulfhaven. To Blackships Inc, Philadelphia in 1958, rebuilt to 12,652 GRT and renamed Gulfjaguar. To Afran Transport Inc, Monrovia in 1972, renamed Burgan. Scrapped at Kaohsiung in 1976.
- Steens Mountain – Built in 1945 by Kaiser Company, Portland for the United States War Shipping Administration, Portland. To Lanmore Co. Inc, Panama in 1947 then Panama Transoceanic Co, Panama in 1948. Rebuilt in 1960 to 14,456 GRT, renamed Mary Ellen Conway. Exploded and caught fire at Manzanillo, Mexico on 13 March 1972. Scrapped at Kaohsiung that year.
- Stillwater – Built in 1944 by Sun Shipbuilding & Drydock Co., Chester. To United States Navy, commissioned as USS Cache (AO-67). To United States Maritime Commission in 1946. To United States Navy in 1948, then to Military Sea Transportation Service in 1949 as USNS Cache (T-AO-67). To United States Maritime Administration in 1972. Scrapped in 1987.
- Stones River – Built in 1945 by Kaiser Company, Portland for the United States War Shipping Administration, Portland. To Anglo-Saxon Petroleum Co, London in 1947, renamed Tribulus. To Shell Petroleum Co, London in 1955. To Shell Tankers Ltd, London in 1960. Scrapped at Faslane in 1961.
- Stony Creek – Built in 1943 by Kaiser Company, Portland for the United States War Shipping Administration, Portland. To American Tramp Shipping Development Corporation, Wilmington in 1948. To Red Canyon Corp, Monrovia in 1957, renamed Poseidon. Scrapped at Blyth in 1960.
- Stony Point – Built in 1943 by Kaiser Company, Portland for the United States War Shipping Administration, Portland. To United States Petroleum Carriers Inc, New York in 1948. To Alexander S. Onassis Corp, Monrovia in 1957. Collided with Ioannis 15 nautical miles (28 km) west of Ouessant, Finistère, France on 18 June 1957 and caught fire. Declared a constructive total loss. Scrapped at Antwerp in 1959.
- Sullys Hill – Built in 1945 by Kaiser Company, Portland for the United States War Shipping Administration, Portland. To Overseas Tanklship Corp, Panama in 1947. Renamed Caltex Mozambique. To Overseas Tankship (UK) Ltd, London in 1954. Scrapped at Kaohsiung in 1966.
- Sunset – Built in 1945 by Kaiser Company, Portland for the United States War Shipping Administration, Portland. To Overseas Tankship Corp, Panama in 1947. Renamed Caltex Lisbon in 1952. To Overseas Tankship (UK) Ltd, London in 1954. To Tokyo Ekikagasu Yusosen K.K, Tokyo, Japan in 1963. Rebuilt as 16,600 GRT liquid petroleum gas tanker, renamed Toyoso Maru. To TLC (Overseas) Inc, Panama in 1977, renamed Toyosu. Scrapped at Kaohsiung in 1984.
- Sunset Hills – Built in 1945 by Marinship, Sausalito for the United States War Shipping Administration, San Francisco. To Southern Trading Company, Wilmington in 1948, renamed Atlantic Importer. To Webb & Knapp Inc, New York in 1953. Renamed Marion Zeckendorf in 1956. To Ocean Freighting & Brokerage Corporation, New York in 1957, renamed Georgetown. To Kulukundis Maritime Industries, New York in 1960, renamed Danny Boy. Scrapped at Osaka in 1961.
- Swan Island – Built in 1944 by Kaiser Company, Portland for the United States War Shipping Administration, Portland. To Anglo-Saxon Petroleum Co, London in 1947, renamed Tomogerus. To Shell Petroleum Co, London in 1955. To Shell Tankers Ltd, London in 1960. Scrapped at Faslane in 1961.
- Sweetwater – Built in 1943 by Alabama Drydock and Shipbuilding Company, Mobile for the United States War Shipping Administration, Mobile. To Metro Petroleum Shipping Co, Wilmington, in 1948. To Sweetwater Corp, Monrovia in 1957. Scrapped at La Spezia in 1961.

== T ==
- Table Rock – Built in 1943 by Kaiser Company, Portland, Oregon for the United States War Shipping Administration, Portland. To French Government, Rouen in 1948, renamed Nivose. To Compagnie Nationale de Navegation, Rouen in 1955. To Nipigon Transport Ltd, Halifax, Canada in 1962. Rebuilt at 18,660 GRT bulk carrier. Scrapped at Lisbon, Portugal in 1985.
- Tampico – Built in 1944 by Sun Shipbuilding & Drydock Co., Chester, Pennsylvania for the United States War Shipping Administration, Philadelphia, Pennsylvania. To Standard Oil of New Jersey, Wilmington, Delaware in 1946, renamed Esso Reading. To Esso Shipping Co, Wilmington in 1950. To Humble Oil & Refining Company, Wilmington in 1960. To Maryland Shipbuilding and Drydock Company, Baltimore, Maryland in 1961, renamed Tampico. Rebuilt in 1962 to 15,709 GRT, then to Mathiasen's Tanker Industries Inc, Wilmington. To American Foreign Steamship Company, New York in 1976, renamed American Hawk. Scrapped at Gadani Beach, Pakistan in 1982.
- The Cabins – Built in 1944 by Alabama Drydock and Shipbuilding Company, Mobile, Alabama for the United States War Shipping Administration, Mobile. To The Cabins Tankers Inc, Wilmington in 1948. Rebuilt to 12,573 GRT in 1959. To Richmond Corporation, Wilmington in 1971, renamed William T. Steele. To Flanigan Loveland Shipping Co, Panama in 1975, renamed Penuelas. Scrapped at Vilanova i la Geltrú, Spain in 1978.
- The Cottonwoods – Built in 1944 by Alabama Drydock and Shipbuilding Company, Mobile for the United States War Shipping Administration, Mobile. To Johs Hansens Rederi, Oslo, Norway in 1947, renamed Hammersborg. To International Navigation Corporation Inc., Monrovia, Liberia in 1960, renamed Potomac. Scrapped at Kaohsiung, Taiwan in 1966.
- The Dalles – Built in 1944 by Kaiser Company, Portland for the United States War Shipping Administration, Portland. To Société Maritime Shell, Le Havre, France in 1948, renamed Junon. Scrapped at Castellón de la Plana, Spain in 1964.
- The Yakima – Built in 1944 by Alabama Drydock and Shipbuilding Company, Mobile for the United States War Shipping Administration, Mobile. To Compagnia Internazionale di Genova S.A., Genoa, Italy in 1947, renamed Frederico G. Fasso. To Villain & Fassio e Compagnia Internazionale di Genova, Genoa in 1957. To Flotilla Mercante Nacional, Tampico, Mexico in 1962, renamed Articulo 32 Constitucional. To Hemlock Shipping Co, Monrovia in 1963, renamed Janill. Renamed Lake Luzerne in 1966. Scrapped at Kaohsiung in 1968.
- Ticonderoga – Built in 1942 by Sun Shipbuilding & Drydock Co., Chester for the United States War Shipping Administration, Philadelphia. To Keystone Tankship Corporation, Wilmington in 1945. Rebuilt to 11,099 GRT in 1954. To Buenaventura Marine Inc, Panama in 1973, renamed Sequoia. Scrapped at Brownsville, Texas, United States in 1976.
- Tillamook – Built in 1944 by Kaiser Company, Portland for the United States War Shipping Administration, Portland. To Trinidad Corporation, Wilmington in 1948. To Sabine Towing & Transportation Company, Baltimore, Maryland in 1966, renamed Colorado. Rebuilt to 16,881 GRT in 1972. Scrapped at Bombay, India in 2000.

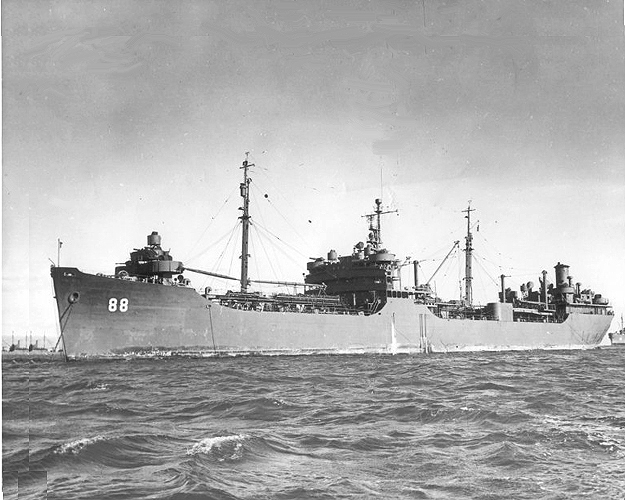
USS Tomahawk.

- Tomahawk (T2-SE-A2 design) – Built in 1943 by Marinship, Sausalito, California. To United States Navy, commissioned in 1944 as USS Tomahawk (AO-88). To Military Sea Transportation Service in 1949 as USNS Tomahawk (T-AO-88). To United States Maritime Administration in 1961. To Hudson Waterways Inc, New York in 1967. Rebuilt with bow section from Mission San Diego and midships section from SS Mission San Jose to form 8,024 GRT vehicle carrier, renamed Seatrain Maine. To United States Department of Commerce in 1975. Renamed Maine in 1978. Extant at Beaumont, Texas in 2010.
- Tonto – Built in 1944 by Kaiser Company, Portland for the United States War Shipping Administration, Portland. To Overseas Tankship Corp, Panama in 1948. Renamed Caltex Bangkok in 1952. Scrapped at Onomichi, Japan in 1966.
- Torrance Hills – Built in 1943 by Marinship, Sausalito for the United States War Shipping Administration, San Francisco. To Donner Foundation Inc, Wilmington in 1948. To The Texas Company, Wilmington in 1950, renamed Wisconsin. Renamed Texaco Wisconsin in 1960. To Hedge Haven Farms Inc, Philadelphia in 1961, renamed Hedge Haven. Scrapped at La Spezia, Italy in 1964.
- Touchet – Built in 1943 by Alabama Drydock and Shipbuilding Company, Mobile for the United States War Shipping Administration, Mobile. Torpedoed and sunk in the Atlantic Ocean (25°50′N 86°30′W) by U-193 on 3 December 1943.
- Trailblazer – Built in 1944 by Kaiser Company, Portland for the United States War Shipping Administration, Portland. To the Norwegian Government, Oslo in 1944, renamed Kapitan Worsoe. To United States Maritime Commission in 1946, renamed Trailblazer. To the French Government, Dunkerque in 1948, renamed Berry. To Société Française de Transports Petrolito ers, Dunkerque in 1956. To the French Government in 1961. Margalante Compagnia Navegation, Monrovia in 1963, renamed Hepta. Scrapped at Hong Kong that year.
- Trenton (T2 design) – Built in 1942 by Sun Shipbuilding & Drydock Co., Chester, Pennsylvania for Socony-Vacuum Oil Company, New York. Laid down as Calusa but launched as Trenton. To Valentine Tankers Corporation, New York in 1953 and renamed Valchem. Collided with Santa Rosa 20 nautical miles (37 km) east of Atlantic City, New Jersey on 26 March 1959 and subsequently towed to New York. Scrapped at La Spezia, Italy in 1961.
- Trevilian – Built in 1945 by Sun Shipbuilding & Drydock Co., Chester, Pennsylvania for the United States War Shipping Administration, Philadelphia. To Administration Nacional de Combustibles, Alcohol y Portland, Montevideo, Uruguay in 1947, renamed Ancap Cuarto. Scrapped at Kaohsiung in 1984.
- Trimble's Ford – Built in 1945 by Sun Shipbuilding & Drydock Co., Chester, Pennsylvania for the United States War Shipping Administration, Philadelphia. To National Bulk Carriers Inc, Wilmington in 1947. Rebuilt to 11,670 GRT in 1948. To Kulukundis Maritime Industries, New York in 1961, renamed Rocky Point. Scrapped at Hirao, Japan in 1963.
- Tule Canyon – Built in 1944 by Alabama Drydock and Shipbuilding Company, Mobile for the United States War Shipping Administration, Mobile. To Compagnia Internazionale di Genova S.A., Genoa, Italy in 1948, renamed Alberto Fasso. To Villain & Fassio e Compagnia Internazionale di Genova, Genoa in 1957. Scrapped at La Spezia in 1963.
- Tullahoma – Built in 1944 by Sun Shipbuilding & Drydock Co., Chester, Pennsylvania for the United States War Shipping Administration, Philadelphia. To Charles Kurz & Co., Inc, Wilmington in 1947. Rebuilt to 14,524 GRT in 1961. To Sabine Transportation Company Towing & Transportation Company, Baltimore in 1978, renamed Llano. Scrapped at Kaohsiung in 1984.
- Tumacacori – Built in 1944 by Sun Shipbuilding & Drydock Co., Chester, Pennsylvania for the United States War Shipping Administration, Philadelphia. To Petros J Goulandis & Sons, Andros, Greece in 1948, renamed Petros. Rebuilt in 1951 to 11,473 GRT. Converted to 11,672 GRT bulk carrier in 1955. To United Shipping & Trading Co of Greece, Androw in 1959. To Benmar Shipping Corp, Piraeus in 1960. Scrapped at Osaka, Japan in 1963.
- Tuolumne Meadows – Built in 1944 by Sun Shipbuilding & Drydock Co., Chester, Pennsylvania for the United States War Shipping Administration, Philadelphia. To Anglo-Saxon Petroleum, London, United Kingdom in 1942, renamed Trigonosemus.To Shell Petroleum Co, London in 1955. To Shell Tankers Ltd, London in 1960. Scrapped at Port Glasgow, Renfrewshire, United Kingdom in 1961.
- Turkey Island – Built in 1944 by Sun Shipbuilding & Drydock Co., Chester, Pennsylvania for the United States War Shipping Administration, Philadelphia. To Esso Transportation Co, London in 1947, renamed Esso Fawley. To Lorca Compagnia Navigation, Monrovia, Liberia in 1955. Rebuilt as a 11,503 GRT oil-ore carrier, renamed Atticus. Renamed Andros Saturn in 1957. To Vicalvaro Compagnia Navigazione, Piraeus, Greece in 1960, renamed Skiathos. Scrapped at Aioi, Japan in 1963.
- Turner's Gap – Built in 1945 by Sun Shipbuilding & Drydock Co., Chester, Pennsylvania for the United States War Shipping Administration, Philadelphia. To Oriental Trade & Transport Co, London in 1947, renamed Stanvac Shanghai. Renamed Stanvac Bangkok in 1954. To Standard Vacuum Transportation Co, London in 1955. Scrapped at Trieste, Italy in 1963.

== U ==
- Umatilla – Built in 1943 by Kaiser Company, Portland, Oregon for the United States War Shipping Administration, Portland. To American Overseas Tanker Corp, Panama in 1948. To World Thought Corp, Monrovia, Liberia in 1956, renamed World Thought. To Jason Shipping Corp, Monrovia in 1960. Rebuilt to 12,949 GRT and renamed World Campaigner. To Continental Oceanic Navigation Corp, Monrovia in 1966, renamed Loretta. To Eddy Steamship Corp, Keelung, Taiwan in 1967, renamed Polly. Scrapped at Kaohsiung in 1975.

== V ==
- Valley Forge – Built in 1942 by Sun Shipbuilding & Drydock Co., Chester, Pennsylvania. To United States Navy, commissioned at USS Tallulah (AO-50). To United States War Shipping Administration in 1946. To United States Navy in 1948, then to Military Sea Transportation Service in 1949 as USNS Tallulah (T-AO-50). To United States Maritime Administration in 1975. Scrapped in 1987.
- Valverde – Built in 1944 by Sun Shipbuilding & Drydock Co, Chester for the United States War Shipping Administration, Philadelphia, Pennsylvania. To Oriental Trade & Transport Co, London, United Kingdom in 1947 and renamed Stanvac Sydney. To Standard-Vacuum Transportation Co, London in 1955. To International Union Line, Monrovia, Liberia in 1960, renamed Union Sydney. Scrapped at Yokosuka, Japan in 1962.
- Ventura Hills – Built in 1945 by Marinship, Sausalito, California for the United States War Shipping Administration, San Francisco, California. To Ventura Steamship Corporation, Wilmington, Delaware in 1948, renamed Ventura. To Tuscarora Corp, Monrovia in 1955, renamed Tuscarora. To World Tempest Corp, Monrovia in 1956, renamed World Tempest. To Ajax Shipping Corp, Piraeus, Greece in 1960. Scrapped at La Spezia in 1965.
- Vera Cruz – Built in 1943 by Sun Shipbuilding & Drydock Co, Chester for The Texas Company, Wilmington. Renamed Maryland in 1950. Renamed Texas Maryland in 1960. To Hudson Waterways Corporation, New York in 1962, renamed Transhatteras. Scrapped at Castellón de la Plana, Spain in 1970.
- Verendrye Built in 1944 by Kaiser Company, Portland, Oregon for the United States War Shipping Administration, Portland. To Northern Petroleum Tank Steamship Co, Newcastle upon Tyne, Northumberland, United Kingdom in 1947, renamed Edenfield. To Hunting Steamship Co, Newcastle upon Tyne in 1949 then Eden Tankers Ltd in 1950. To Northern Shipping Corp, Monrovia in 1959, renamed Northern Venture. To Northern Shipping (Bahamas) Ltd, Toronto, Ontario, Canada in 1961, rebuilt as 16,628 GRT bulk carrier. To Upper Lakes Shipping Co, Toronto in 1975. Scrapped in 1983, bow section to Cabot.
- Vicksburg – Built in 1943 by Sun Shipbuilding & Drydock Co, Chester for the United States War Shipping Administration, Philadelphia. To Gulf Oil Corporation, Philadelphia in 1948, renamed Gulfvictor. To Maryland Shipbuilding and Drydock Company in 1961, renamed Vicksburg. To United States Steel Corporation, New York in 1964, rebuilt as 6,778 GRT bulk carrier, renamed Geneva. Scrapped at Vilanova i la Geltrú, Spain in 1974.
- Victory Loan – Built in 1945 by Kaiser Company, Portland for the United States War Shipping Administration, Portland. To Overseas Tankship Corp, Panama in 1947. To Overseas Tankship (UK) Ltd, London, United Kingdom in 1950. Renamed Caltex Melbourne in 1951. To Texaco Overseas Tankship Ltd, London in 1967, rebuilt to 13,899 GRT and renamed Texaco Melbourne. Scrapped at Porto Alegre, Brazil in 1985.
- Vincennes – Built in 1942 by Sun Shipbuilding Co, Chester for Standard Oil Company of New Jersey, Wilmington. Launched as Vincennes but renamed Esso Norfolk later that year. To Esso Shipping Company, Wilmington in 1950. To Panama Transport Co, Panama in 1956 then Panama Transport & Shipping Co, Panama in 1961. To Esso Transport & Shipping Co, Panama in 1964. Scrapped at Kaohsiung in 1969.

== W ==
- Wagon Box – Built in 1944 by Alabama Drydock and Shipbuilding Company, Mobile, Alabama for the United States War Shipping Administration, Mobile. To National Bulk Carriers Inc, Wilmington, Delaware in 1948. To Argyll Shipping Co, London, United Kingdom in 1963, renamed Coral Venture. Rebuilt in 1964 to 9,121 GRT bulk cement carrier. To Rolaco Trading & Contracting Co, Jeddah, Saudi Arabia in 1977, renamed Dima. To Dima Shipping Corp, Panama in 1979, renamed Dima I. To Larna Shipping Co, Jeddan in 1981, renamed Dima. Scrapped at Aliağa, Turkey in 1983.
- Wagon Mound – Built in 1945 by Alabama Drydock and Shipbuilding Company, Mobile, Alabama for the United States War Shipping Administration, Mobile. To Overseas Tankship Corporation, Panama in 1948. Renamed Caltex Stockholm in 1952. To Loyal Navigation Co, Panama in 1967, renamed Loyal Hunters. Scrapped at Kaohsiung, Taiwan in 1969.
- Wahoo Swamp – Built in 1944 by Alabama Drydock and Shipbuilding Company, Mobile, Alabama for the United States War Shipping Administration, Mobile. To Gulf Oil Company, Philadelphia, Pennsylvania in 1948, renamed Gulfswamp. To Emder Tankschiffe GmbH, Emden, West Germany in 1960, renamed Emspirol. To Nereid Steamship Corp, Panama in 1967, renamed Nereid. Scrapped at Kaohsiung in 1972.
- Wallowa – Built in 1943 by Kaiser Company, Portland, Oregon for the United States War Shipping Administration, Portland. To Panama Oceanic Lines, Panama in 1947. Renamed World Treasure in 1956. Rebuilt in 1959 as 13,036 GRT bulk carrier. To World Challenger Corp, Monrovia, Liberia later that year, renamed World Challenger. To Ocean Cargo Ships Inc, New York in 1961, renamed Globe Progress. To Overseas Oil Carriers Inc, New York in 1967, renamed Overseas Progress in 1968. To Bowling Green Navigation Corp, Panama in 1974, renamed Sophia. Scrapped at Inchon, South Korea in 1978.
- War Bonnet – Built in 1945 by Alabama Drydock and Shipbuilding Company, Mobile, Alabama for the United States War Shipping Administration, Mobile. To Overseas Tankship Corp, Panama in 1947. To N.V. Nederlandsche Pacific Tankvaart Maatschapij, The Hague, Netherlands in 1950, renamed Caltex Pernis. Scrapped at Hirao, Japan in 1967.
- Warrior Point – Built in 1944 by Kaiser Company, Portland, Oregon for the United States War Shipping Administration, Portland. To Overseas Tankship Corp, Panama in 1947. Renamed Caltex Cebu in 1952. To Tokyo Tanker K.K., Tokyo, Japan in 1961, renamed Cebu Maru. To Morita Rinkai Kogyo K.K., Ichinomiya, Japan in 1963, renamed Shunyo Maru No. 1 and converted to a sand carrier. Scrapped at Kaohsiung in 1970.
- Washita – Built in 1943 by Alabama Drydock and Shipbuilding Company, Mobile, Alabama for the United States War Shipping Administration, Mobile. To J. M. Carras Inc, Wilmington in 1948, renamed Trinity. To Phenix Petroleum Shipping Inc, Monrovia in 1955, renamed Amelia. Scrapped at Bilbao, Spain in 1964.
- Wauhatchie – Built in 1944 by Sun Shipbuilding & Drydock Co., Chester, Pennsylvania for the United States War Shipping Administration, Philadelphia. To Anglo-American Oil Company, London in 1946, renamed Esso Glasgow. To Esso Petroleum Co, London in 1951. Scrapped at Bilbao in 1971.
- Waxhaws – Built in 1944 by Sun Shipbuilding & Drydock Co., Chester, Pennsylvania for the United States War Shipping Administration, Philadelphia. To Sun Oil Company, Philadelphia in 1946, renamed Sunoil. To Penntrans Company, Wilmington in 1963, renamed Penn Carrier. Scrapped at Santander, Spain in 1972.
- Wheeler Hills – Built in 1945 by Marinship, Sausalito, California for the United States War Shipping Administration, San Francisco, California. To N.V. Petroleum Industrie Maatscahppij, The Hague in 1947, renamed Esso Rotterdam. To Esso Tankvaart Maatschappij, The Hague in 1958. To Comet Shipping Co S.A., Piraeus, Greece in 1959, renamed Phaeton. Rebuilt in 1960 to 15,005 GRT bulk carrier. Reflagged to Liberia in 1965. To Creole Shipping Ltd, Nassau, Bahamas in 1974, renamed Pyramid Veteran. To F. B. V. Corp (Bahamas), Ltd, Nassau in 1977, renamed Cat No. 1. Scrapped at Brownsville, Texas, United States in 1978.
- White Bird Canyon – Built in 1944 by Alabama Drydock and Shipbuilding Company, Mobile for the United States War Shipping Administration, Mobile. To the French Government, Le Havre in 1948, renamed Gonfreville. To Compagnie Naval des Petroles, Le Havre in 1956. To Victor Shipping Inc, Monrovia in 1962, renamed Good Hope. To Manor Investment Co, Monrovia in 1964. Renamed San Patrick and rebuilt as 14,494 GRT bulk carrier. Wrecked on Ulak Island, Alaska, United States on 17 December 1964.
- White Oak – – Built in 1943 by Kaiser Shipyards, Portland for the United States War Shipping Administration, Portland. To Evgenia J. Chandris, Piraeus in 1948. Scrapped at Keelung, Taiwan in 1966.
- White Plains – Built in 1942 by Sun Shipbuilding & Drydock Co., Chester, Pennsylvania for the United States War Shipping Administration, Philadelphia. To Sun Oil Company, Philadelphia in 1947, renamed Michigan Sun. To Union Carbide Corporation, New York in 1960, renamed Carbide Seadrift. Converted to 9,315 GRT chemical carrier in 1961. To Allied Towing Corporation, Norfolk, Virginia in 1980, renamed Seadrift. Laid up in 1984. Scrapped in 2001.
- White River – – Built in 1944 by Alabama Drydock and Shipbuilding Company, Mobile for the United States War Shipping Administration, Mobile. To Pan Oceanic Lines Inc, Panama in 1948. Renamed World Tradition in 1956. To World Commander Corp, Monrovia in 1959, renamed World Commander and rebuilt to 13,103 GRT bulk carrier. To Marine Carriers Corporation, New York in 1963, renamed Commander. To American Grain Steamship Corporation, New York, renamed American Grain then to North Beach Steamship Company, Wilmington later that year and renamed Santa Elia. Reflagged to Panama in 1974. Ran aground off Vlissingen, Netherlands on 26 April 1975. Refloated and laid up, scrapped at Bilbao in 1976.
- White Sands – Built in 1945 by Kaiser Company, Portland for the United States War Shipping Administration, Portland. To Anglo-Saxon Petroleum, London in 1947, renamed Thaumastus. To Shell Petroleum Ltd, London in 1955 then Shell Tankers Ltd, London in 1960. Scrapped at Blyth, Northumberland, United Kingdom in 1961.
- Whitehorse – Built in 1944 by Sun Shipbuilding & Drydock Co., Chester for the United States War Shipping Administration, Philadelphia. To Panama Transport Co, Panama in 1947, renamed Esso Cambridge then Esso Sao Paulo later that year. Rebuilt to 11,307 GRT in 1954. Renamed Sao Paulo in 1959. To Panama Transport & Navigation Co, Panama in 1961, renamed Esso Sao Paulo. To Esso Transport & Navigation Co, Panama in 1964. Scrapped at Kaohsiung in 1967.
- Whittier Hills – Built in 1945 by Marinship, Sausalito, California for the United States War Shipping Administration, San Francisco. To National Bulk Carriers Inc, Wilmington in 1948. To Pan-Atlantic Steamship Corp, Panama in 1955, renamed Almena. To United States Tankers Corp, Wilmington in 1960. Scrapped at Hirao in 1964.
- Williamsburg – Built in 1944 by Sun Shipbuilding Co, Chester for The Texas Company, Wilmington. Renamed Nevada in 1950. Rebuilt in 1959 to 12,300 GRT and renamed Texaco Nevada. Scrapped at Kaohsiung in 1969.
- Wilson's Creek – Built in 1944 by Alabama Drydock and Shipbuilding Company, Mobile for the United States War Shipping Administration, Mobile. To the French Government, Marseille in 1947, renamed Frontignan. To Société Mazout Transports, Marseille in 1948. To Société Mobil Transports, Marseille in 1959. To Cargian Steamship Corp, Monrovia in 1963, renamed Oceanic Hunter then to Loukas Steamship Corp, Monrovia later that year and renamed Agios Loukas. Renamed Pescara in 1964. To San Constantino Compagnia de Transportes Maritimos, Monrovia in 1966, renamed Marco R. Scrapped at Castellón de la Plana in 1969.
- Winchester – Built in 1943 by Sun Shipbuilding Co, Chester for the United States War Shipping Administration, San Francisco. To Panama Transoceanic Co, S.A, Panama in 1947. Rebuilt to 14,424 GRT in 1960, renamed Betty Conway. Reflagged to Liberia in 1966. Scrapped at Bilbao in 1977.
- Winter Hill – Built in 1945 by Sun Shipbuilding Co, Chester for the United States War Shipping Administration, San Francisco. To Ships Inc, New York in 1945. To Skar-Ore Steamship Corporation, Wilmington in 1960. Rebuilt as 12,501 GRT bulk carrier. Scrapped at Gijón, Spain in 1985.
- W. L. R Emmet- Built in 1944 by Kaiser Company, Portland for the United States War Shipping Administration, Portland. To N. G. Nicolaou, Piraeus in 1948, renamed Agios Georgios V. Scrapped at La Spezia in 1967.
- Wolf Creek – Built in 1944 by Kaiser Company, Portland for the United States War Shipping Administration, Portland. To Panama Oceanic Lines Inc, Panama in 1947. To Statel Compagnia se Vapores, Panama in 1956, renamed World Toil. Rebuilt as 13,005 GRT bulk carrier in 1961, renamed World Centurion. To Alexandra Navigation Corp, Panama in 1965, renamed Irene. To Eddie Steamship Corp, Keelung in 1967, renamed Tailee. Scrapped at Kaohsiung in 1977.
- Wolf Mountain – Built in 1944 by Alabama Drydock and Shipbuilding Company, Mobile for the United States War Shipping Administration, Mobile. To Stanolind Marine Transport Company, Wilmington in 1948, renamed A. W. Peake. To Pan-American Petroleum & Transport Company, Wilmington in 1950, renamed Pan-Delaware in 1951. To American Oil Company, Delaware in 1954, renamed Amoco Delaware in 1956. To First Tanker Corporation, Delaware in 1957, rebuilt to 12,529 GRT. To American Oil Company, Delaware in 1960. To Amoco Shipping Company, New York in 1970, rebuilt to 15,049 GRT in 1971. To Amoco Shipping Company, Wilmington in 1980. Renamed Delaware Sea in 1985. To Sealift Inc, Wilmington in 1985, renamed Delaware Star. Scrapped at Kaohsiung later that year.
- Wood Lake – Built in 1944 by Alabama Drydock and Shipbuilding Company, Mobile for the United States War Shipping Administration, Mobile. To the French Government, Le Havre in 1947, renamed Petit Couronne then Ronsard later that year. To Petrotankers Société Anonyme, Le Havre in 1948. To Superior Shipping Co, Monrovia in 1960, renamed Caribbean Sky. Rebuilt as 14,243 GRT bulk carrier in 1961, renamed Aspronisos. Renamed Lake Placid in 1966. To Philip Shipping Corp, Monrovia in 1970, renamed Garanda. Scrapped in 1973 at Santander, bow section joined to stern section of Akron.
- Wyoming Valley – Built in 1944 by Alabama Drydock and Shipbuilding Company, Mobile for the United States War Shipping Administration, Mobile. To Southern Trading Corp, Wilmington in 1948, renamed Atlantic Voyager. To Webb & Knapp Inc, New York in 1950. To Kingston Steamship Corp, New York in 1957, renamed Wang Cavalier. Renamed Kingston in 1959. To Commerce Tankers Corporation, Wilmington in 1960, renamed Anne Marie. Scrapped at Trieste in 1963.

== Y ==
- Yamhill – Built in 1943 by Kaiser Company, Portland, Oregon for the United States War Shipping Administration, Portland. To American Overseas Tanker Corporation, Panama in 1948. To World Thrift Corp, Monrovia, Liberia in 1956, renamed World Thrift. To Aphrodite Shipping Co Ltd, Monrovia in 1961. Rebuilt in 1962 to 12,846 GRT and renamed World Cheer. To Continental Oceanic Navigation Corp, Monrovia in 1966, renamed Greta. To Outerocean Navigation Corp, Kaohsiung, Taiwan in 1968. Scrapped at Kaohsiung in 1975.
- Yellow Tavern – Built in 1944 by Sun Shipbuilding & Drydock Co., Chester, Pennsylvania for the United States War Shipping Administration, Philadelphia, Pennsylvania. To Overseas Tankship Corp, Panama in 1946. Renamed Caltex Columbia in 1951. To Overseas Tankship (UK) Ltd, London in 1952. Scrapped at Etajima, Japan in 1967.
- York – Built in 1943 by Kaiser Company, Portland for the United States War Shipping Administration, Portland. To Compagnia Internazionale di Genova S.A., Genoa, Italy in 1947, renamed Franca Fassia. To Villain & Fassio e Compagnia Internazionale di Genova, Genoa in 1957. Scrapped at La Spezia, Italy in 1963.

== See also ==
- T2 tanker
