= Bull Run =

Bull Run or Bullrun may refer to:

== Military ==
- First Battle of Bull Run (First Manassas), 1861, the first major battle of the American Civil War
- Second Battle of Bull Run (Second Manassas), 1862, a later battle also at Bull Run
- Operation Bull Run, a military operation of the Iraq War and part of Operation Marne Torch
- Bullrun (decryption program), a secret anti-encryption program run by the US National Security Agency (NSA)
- USNS Bull Run (T-AO-156), an oil tanker

== Places in the United States ==
=== Virginia ===
- Bull Run (Occoquan River tributary), a stream in Fairfax, Loudoun, and Prince William counties, site of the Civil War battles
  - Bull Run, Fairfax County, Virginia, a census-designated place west of Centreville, northeast of the stream; See U.S. Route 29 in Virginia
  - Bull Run, Prince William County, Virginia, a census-designated place northwest of Manassas, west of the stream
  - Bull Run Mountain Estates, Virginia, a census-designated place in Prince William County, southwest of the stream
  - Bull Run Regional Park, on the stream in Fairfax County
- Bull Run Mountains, a mountain range in Fauquier, Loudoun, and Prince William counties

=== Elsewhere ===
- Bull Run Mountains (Nevada), a mountain range in Elko County
- Bull Run (Deep River tributary), a stream in Guilford County, North Carolina
- Bull Run River (Oregon)
  - Bull Run Lake, a reservoir, an impoundment of the river
  - Bull Run Hydroelectric Project, a former dam project on the river
  - Bull Run, Oregon, an unincorporated community named for the river
  - Bull Run National Forest, a former national forest
- Bull Run Creek, a stream in South Dakota
- Bull Run Fossil Plant also known as Bull Run Steam Plant, a coal-fired electric generating station owned by the Tennessee Valley Authority

== Entertainment ==
- Bull Run (novel), a young adult novel by Paul Fleischman about the First Battle of Bull Run
- The Battles of Bull Run, a 1973 board wargame that simulates both battles of Bull Run
- Bullrun Rally, an automobile rally in North America
- Bull running, a defunct event once common in England, in which townsfolk chased down a bull then slaughtered it
  - Stamford bull run, the last surviving such event, ending in 1839
  - Tutbury bull run
- Running of the bulls, events in Spain, Portugal, France, and Mexico, in which people run in front of a number of bulls, often used in bullfighting after the run
- Bull Run (film), a 2024 American comedy

== Other uses ==
- Bull market or bull run, a rising market trend in economics

== See also ==
- Racing Bulls
- Battle of Bull Run (disambiguation)
