= Tutbury bull run =

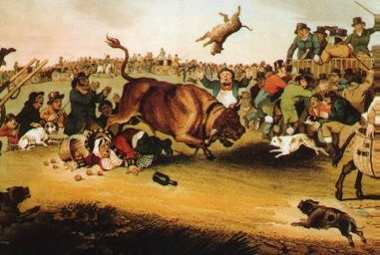
An 1821 depiction of bull running elsewhere in England

The Tutbury bull run was a blood sport that took place in Tutbury, Staffordshire, from the 14th century until 1778. It formed part of the annual Court of Minstrels, a ceremonial legal proceeding for travelling musicians in the nearby counties. The Tutbury bull run is first recorded in 1414 but may be of earlier origin, though a story that it was begun by John of Gaunt to remind his Spanish wife of home is believed false. The bull was provided to the minstrels by Tutbury Priory and, after the Dissolution of the Monasteries, by the Duke of Devonshire. The bull would be chased through the town by the minstrels who could claim it if it was caught. It was afterwards baited to death and served in a feast. The event developed into a competition between Staffordshire and Derbyshire residents who competed to catch the bull within their own counties. After the decline of the Court of Minstrels the bull run developed into a drunken revel. It was abolished in 1778 after a man was killed during a mass brawl.

== Origins ==
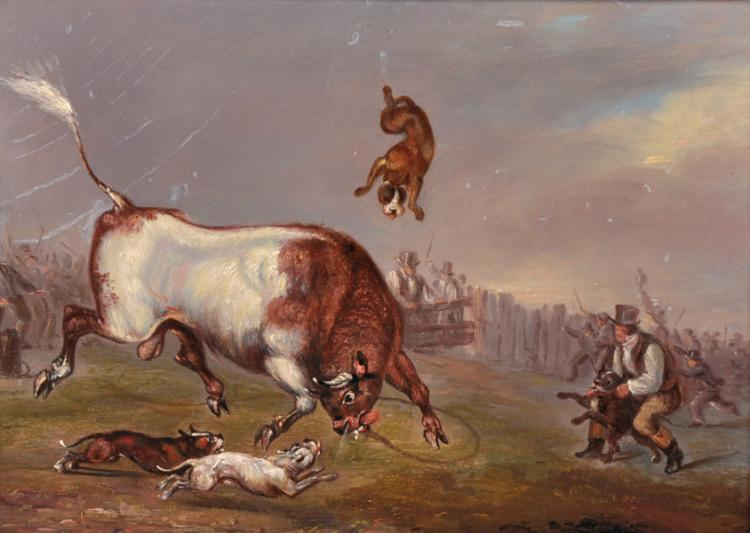
An early 19th-century depiction of bull baiting in England

The bull run originated as an entertainment during the Court of Minstrels, a 14th-century institution that served to regulate the activities of travelling musicians in counties near Tutbury. It was held annually on 16 August, the day after the feast of the Assumption of Mary, though if this was a Sunday it was postponed by a day. An 1835 magazine article claims that the Tutbury bull run was first mentioned in records of 1414 that state that it was first held in 1377. However, it may even be of pagan origin. One folk legend, which is believed to be false, states that the bull run was started by John of Gaunt, who rebuilt Tutbury Castle in 1374, and wanted to remind his Spanish wife of her homeland where bull running was popular. Bull running was a popular blood sport of the late medieval and early modern period; a bull was made to rampage through a town for entertainment, often chased by the residents. The bull was often killed or maimed in the chase or else subsequently baited to death.

The Tutbury Priory played an important role in the bull run; the institution provided the necessary bull, though the obligation to do so does not survive in the historic record; it may be that it was provided in lieu of other obligations to the court. The practice survived the Dissolution of the Monasteries, after which the obligation was transferred to the Duke of Devonshire, who had assumed the priory lands. In lieu of the Assumption feast, a fair was held on 15 August.

== Running of the bull ==
The bull run started at the priory gate, though after the Dissolution a barn belonging to the town bailiff was used (this was sited some 0.25 miles, 0.40 km from the county boundary with Derbyshire). The Bull's horns were removed, its ears and tail cropped and the skin smeared with soap to make it harder to catch; pepper was also blown into its nostrils to enrage it. The bull was loosed between 4 pm and 5 pm and the minstrels had until sunset to try to catch him. No man, apart from a minstrel, was permitted to close within 40 feet (12 m) of the bull.

If caught, and proof given by means of hair cut from the bull, then it was donated to the minstrels otherwise it was returned to the donor. It would then be brought to the town's market cross, baited with dogs and killed. The carcass would often form the centrepiece of a subsequent feast. The minstrels had the right to claim a bounty of 40 pence (3s 4d; £0.17 in modern currency) in lieu of the bull, if desired.

In some years the bull had to be caught on the Staffordshire side of the River Dove to be claimed by the minstrels, later it could be claimed within Derbyshire but only by minstrels from that county. The event thereafter developed into a contest between Staffordshire and Derbyshire residents, with fights sometimes breaking out over ownership of the bull. In some years the bull escaped as far as Hoon (near Hilton) or Sudbury (some 6 kilometres, 3.7 mi away). Broken bones were frequent and it was not uncommon for lives to be lost.

== Abolition ==
The Court of Minstrels declined in the 18th-century and the bull run became a more general drunken revel. A man was killed during the 1778 run after a mass brawl broke out between locals and visitors from Burton upon Trent. The vicar of St Mary's Church, Tutbury, Joseph Dixon, drew up a petition to William Cavendish, 5th Duke of Devonshire for abolition and, after consultation with the king and government a meeting was called at Ashbourne, Derbyshire. A panel of 15 men from Derbyshire and 15 from Staffordshire agreed with Dixon and the Duke, with the king's approval, directed the abolition of the practice. For some years bull-baiting was carried out in its stead but this too was abolished following the intervention of the local gentry. Bull-baiting continued to be a common and popular entertainment in England and Staffordshire in particular, until its abolition by the Cruelty to Animals Act 1835. It was particularly associated with the events of Wakes week in the Midlands and Northern England.

A more infamous event, the Stamford bull run, continued until 1839 despite being banned by the 1835 act; though the Tutbury run was held to have been more excessive.
