= Court of Minstrels =

Ancient court in Staffordshire, England

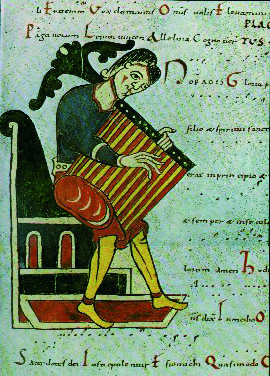
A c. 13th-century depiction of a minstrel

The Court of Minstrels was a court held in Tutbury, Staffordshire, for minstrels (travelling musicians) from the nearby counties. The court was founded by John of Gaunt, the Duke of Lancaster, who held Tutbury Castle, for the encouragement of the minstrels' art and for their better regulation. A King of the Minstrels governed the court and juries of minstrels adjudicated in disputes and complaints. The court met annually at Tutbury on the Assumption of Mary, 15 August, and the following day held entertainments including the Tutbury bull run. The court was ordered to cease in 1778 but seems to have continued into the early 19th century.

== Foundation ==
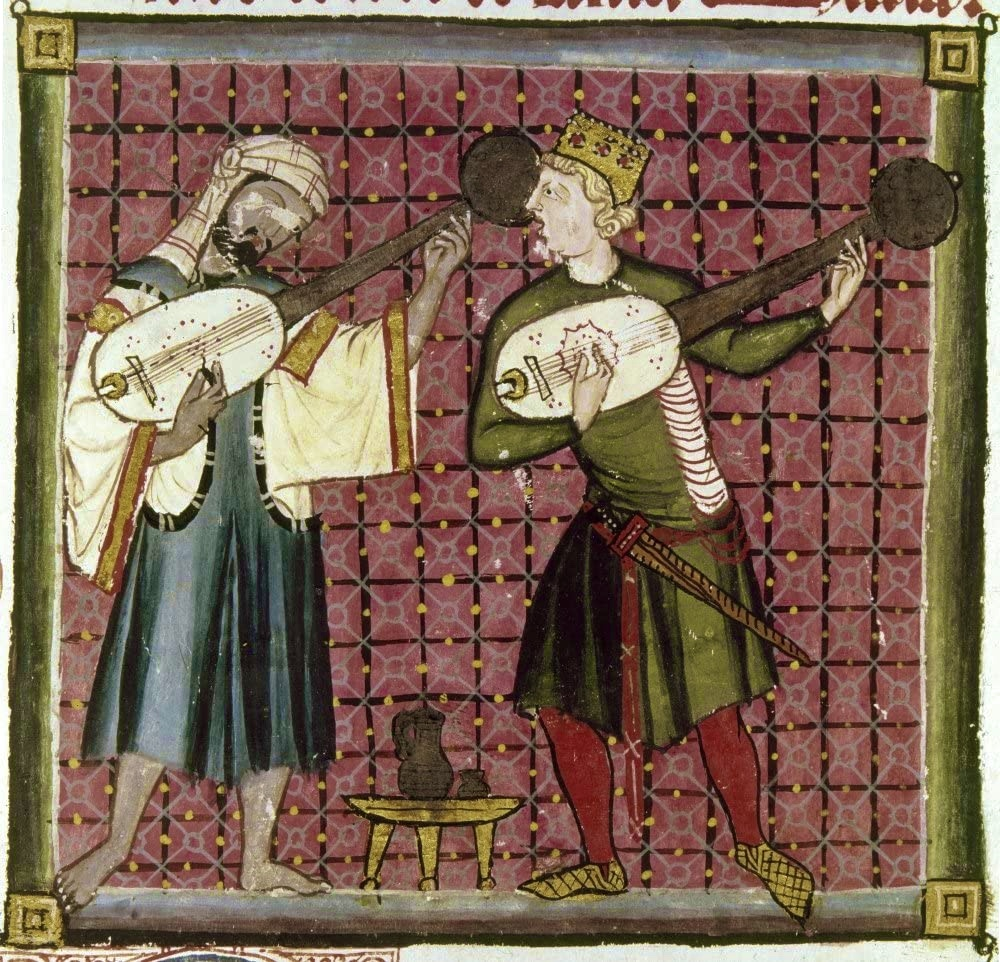
A 13th-century depiction of minstrels in Castile

In the 14th century music was an important form of entertainment and minstrels, travelling musicians, occupied a position of some status. Minstrels had visited Tutbury on the 15 August for the fair marking the feast day of the assumption of Mary, patron of Tutbury Priory, since at least 1314. John of Gaunt, who then held Tutbury Castle, in 1372 claimed the title of King of Castile, in modern Spain, through his marriage to Constance of Castile. His royal court at Tutbury encouraged the art of the minstrels, including by bringing some over from Spain, and was a key centre for the musicians.

In August 1380 John implemented a "King of the Minstrels" to help govern the musicians, though such a post may have existed pre-1314. The Tutbury king of the minstrels is the only known non-royal officer to hold such a position in England and Gaunt may have been inspired to make the appointment by his pretensions to Castile. There were complaints from the minstrels that the fines levied by the king were too severe and so, shortly afterwards, a Court of Minstrels was founded to levy the fines and handle complaints and disputes within the trade.

== Jurisdiction and powers ==
The jurisdiction of the court seems to have varied. At one time it encompassed the counties of Staffordshire, Derbyshire, Nottinghamshire, Leicestershire and Warwickshire but by the fifth year of the reign of Charles I (c. 1630) it was limited to Staffordshire and Derbyshire. All minstrels within the court's jurisdiction were compelled to attend or else pay a fine which, by 1630, was four shillings and six pence. In one story the legendary outlaw Robin Hood is said to have attended the court.

The court seems to have acted mainly to encourage the quality of music performed by minstrels. By 1630 laws, enacted by the king, were enforced that all minstrels in the jurisdiction of the court were to be approved by the juries of that court. No man could trade as a minstrel without first undertaking seven years of training with an approved minstrel, or else be fined three shillings and four pence for each month of the offence. Any approved minstrel taking on an apprentice and failing to provide the required years of training would be fined 40 shillings. Fines of 10 shillings were levied on minstrels not subject to the court that played within its jurisdiction and fines of 40 shillings, in addition to those levied by magistrates and constables, were imposed on those who played during church services. All fines levied were divided between the stewards of the court and the Duchy of Lancaster (as John of Gaunt had held this title). The court looks to have created a well-ordered society of minstrels with pride in their work and as such to have functioned in a similar manner to the tradesmen's guilds of the period.

== Ceremony of the court ==
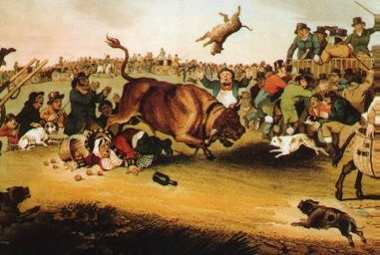
An 1821 depiction of a bull run elsewhere in England

The court sat on 16 August and all minstrels in the jurisdiction were compelled to attend the annual ceremony on penalty of a fine of three shillings and four pence. The minstrels assembled at the house of the bailiff of the Manor of Tutbury and proceeded, in procession, to St Mary's Church (which was the church of Tutbury Priory). This procession was led by the bailiff and the steward of Tutbury together with the "King of the Minstrels", who was elected annually, attended by four of his own stewards.

After a church service the minstrels proceeded to Tutbury Castle to hold court, which was presided over by the woodmaster of Needwood Forest. Two juries, each of fifteen men, were assembled, one of minstrels from Staffordshire and one of representatives of the remainder of the jurisdiction (principally Derbyshire). Afterwards the juries met to select a new king for the following year from among the stewards, typically the holder of the post alternated between minstrels from Staffordshire and Derbyshire. The court also chose new stewards, two for Staffordshire and two for remaining jurisdiction. Three of the stewards were elected by the jury and the fourth nominated by the steward of the manor.

Afterwards the new king was formally invested with his wand of office by the outgoing king, during a banquet at which the court, bailiff and steward of the manor were entertained with musical performances. The court afterwards reconvened under its new officers and undertook its business of adjudicating disputes and levying fines.

After taking dinner in Tutbury Castle the minstrels processed to the priory gate to witness the Tutbury bull run, a blood sport entertainment in which a bull, provided by the priory, was let loose through the streets. The bull would be chased by the minstrels who could claim it for their own, if caught. The bull was thereafter eaten by those assembled. After the Dissolution of the Monasteries the Duke of Devonshire, who had acquired the priory estates, provided the bull and the event commenced from the barn of the town's bailiff.

== Decline ==
By 1772 the court was in decline due to a lack of funds to support the proceedings. That year the Derbyshire minstrels refused to send jurors to the court and the king and two stewards were selected by the Staffordshire jury alone. The court officers wrote to William Cavendish, 5th Duke of Devonshire to complain about the deterioration of the court and to lay claim to rents and other obligations that it said were due. The court claimed it was in danger of collapse due to the financial situation and the absence of minstrels from the juries.

The court was ordered abolished by the Duke of Devonshire in 1778 due to the destruction and inconvenience caused by the annual bull run. The court defied this order and continued to meet annually in a house on the castle grounds into the 1810s, but seems to have finally ended at some point between 1817 and 1832.
