= Bull running =

Former English custom

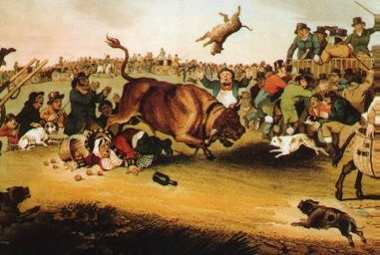
Bull running in 1821, depicted by Charles Towne.

Bull running was a custom practised in England until the 19th century. (Note: Griffin-Kremer has suggested that bull running, as distinct from bull baiting, may also have occasionally occurred in Waterford, Ireland; however, the release of the bull through the town seems to have been a protest at the failure of newly-elected mayors to provide the traditional rope, collar and buckle "at the charge of the city revenue" for the annual bull baiting.) It involved chasing a bull through the streets of a town until it was weakened, then slaughtering the animal and butchering it for its meat. Bull running became illegal in 1835, and the last bull run took place in Stamford, Lincolnshire, in 1839. The practice was not confined to any particular region, with bull runs also documented at Axbridge in the south west, Canterbury and Wokingham in the south east, Tutbury in the midlands, and Wisbech in the east.

The origins of the custom are uncertain, and the date of observance varied across the country. In Stamford, the bull run took place on St Brice's Day (13 November); in Tutbury, it was held on the Feast of the Assumption (15 August); and in Axbridge on Guy Fawkes Day (5 November). (Note: Peacock notes that in Stamford, "So fond were the people of the sport that a second bull was frequently subscribed for and run in some of the streets on the Monday after Christmas.") Participants may be referred to as bullards, as in the Bullards' Song associated with the Stamford bull run.

== Origins ==
The earliest documented instance of bull running appears in 1389, among medieval guild records collected by Joshua Toulmin Smith. The document—from Stamford's "Gild of St. Martin"—states that "on the feast of St. Martin, this gild, by custom beyond reach of memory, has a bull; which bull is hunted [not baited] by dogs, and then sold; whereupon the bretheren and sisteren sit down to feast." The phrase "custom beyond reach of memory" leaves uncertainty about whether the custom pre-dated the guild—which was established by 1329—or was instituted by the guild itself. Local folklore in Stamford maintained that the tradition was begun by William de Warenne, 5th Earl of Surrey, during the reign of King John (1199—1216). The story, recorded by Richard Butcher in his The Survey and Antiquitie of Stamford Towne (1646), and described by Walsh as "patently fictional", relates how Warenne:

...was looking out of his castle window one 13 November and spied out on the meadow two bulls fighting over a cow. The Stamford butchers then came with their dogs to part the bulls, enraging them further and causing them to stampede through the town tossing about men, women and children. Earl Warenne joined the wild mêlée on horseback and so enjoyed himself that he gave to the butchers of Stamford that piece of mating ground, thereafter called "Bull-meadow", on condition that they replicate the event yearly thereafter. (Note: Walsh writes of the story: "[T]he most this actually tells us is that Stamford’s folk-imagination (if we can talk of such a thing) could not imagine anything earlier than the reign of King John.")

A similar origin-story involving a noble is found at Tutbury, Staffordshire, where the tradition was said to have been started by John of Gaunt shortly after he married his Spanish wife, Constance of Castile, in 1372, in an effort to remind her of her home. The story was first advanced—purely as speculation—by Robert Plot in his The Natural History of Stafford-Shire (1686), where he writes:

...through the emulation in point of manhood, that has long been cherish't between the Staffordshire and Derbyshire men, perhaps as much mischief may have been done in the triall between them, as in the Jeu de Taureau or Bull-fighting practised at Valentia, Madrid, and many other places in Spain, whence perhaps this our Custom of Bull-running might be derived, and set up here by John of Gaunt, who was King of Castile and Leon, and Lord of the Honour of Tutbury; for why might not we receive this sport from the Spanyards, as well as they from the Romans and the Romans from the Greeks?

Samuel Pegge, addressing the Society of Antiquaries in 1765, dismissed Plot's conjecture as "entirely mistaken", while lamenting that it had become received wisdom in the interim. While John of Gaunt had established a Court of Minstrels at Tutbury in 1381, the bull running appears instead to have been instituted by the prior of Tutbury Priory (founded c.1080 as a dependency of the abbey at Saint-Pierre-sur-Dives) as part of the Feast of the Assumption celebrations which, as early as 1230, required the prior to provide "a great feast". Pegge also notes that the bull used for running was provided by the prior, and that the animal "was turned out antiently at the abbey-gate, and by the prior; John of Gaunt or his officers being no way employed in that service."

Walsh observed that the bull running that took place in November occurred in the calendar around Martinmas, which "traditionally marked the slaughtering time for the beef, swine and geese not being maintained through the winter on stored feed." During the Anglo-Saxon period, November was called Blōtmōnaþ ("sacrifice month") or Blōdmōnaþ ("blood month"). Langeslag cautions: "Whether the [Anglo-Saxons'] slaughter was accompanied by a celebration, and whether such a celebration would have been secular or religious, is not known, although a twelfth-century reader of Bede gave the month name the explanation 'because this is when they offered the cattle to be killed to their gods'. Whether this should be read as speculation or report, it is certain that the necessary conditions for a gathering, secular or religious, were in place at this time of year." William Fitzstephen, writing in 1173, indicates that, in London at least, the animals to be slaughtered were often first used for sport: "[T]he youth are entertained in a morning with boars fighting to the last gasp, as likewise with hogs full tusked, intended to be converted into bacon; or game-bulls, and bears of a large bulk, are baited with dogs."

== Other bull running ==
It was reported on 23 January 1792 that a mad ox was run in the Market-place, Peterborough. "it was one of the finest but most ferocious creatures ever seen. Another of the breed is to be run next week". It was reported in February 1799 "About a fortnight since J.W Draper, Esq. of Peterborough, gave a bull- running at that place,- which afforded much entertainment to the inhabitants, and the more so, as no mischief endued. The beast was afterwards killed, and distributed amongst a number of indigent families, which proved a great relief to them at this inclement season. It is Mr. Draper's intention to "give a bull running every year at Peterborough, on the anniversary of Bishop Blaze, and to dispose of the meat in the same way."

== See also ==
- Stamford bull run
- Bull-baiting
- Bullfighting
  - Spanish-style bullfighting
- Bull-leaping (ancient)
  - Course landaise (modern France)
  - Recortes (modern Spain)
- Jallikattu (India)
- Running of the bulls (Spain, Portugal, France, Mexico)
  - Toro embolado or bou embolat
- Pacu jawi (bull race), Indonesia

== Notes and references ==
Notes

Bibliography

- Bushaway, Bob (1993), "Bulls, Ballads, Minstrels and Manors: Some Observations on the Defence of Customs in Eighteenth-Century England", in Buckland, Theresa; Wood, Juliette (eds.), Aspects of British Calendar Customs, Sheffield: Sheffield Academic Press, pp. 75–93, ISBN 1-850-75243-5
- Fitzstephen, William (1772), Pegge, Samuel (ed.), Fitz-Stephen's Description of the City of London, London: B. White
- Griffin-Kremer, Cozette (2003), "May Day and Mayhem: Portraits of a Holiday in Eighteenth-Century Dublin Ballads", in McKean, Thomas A. (ed.), The Flowering Thorn: International Ballad Studies, Logan: Utah State University Press, pp. 101–128, ISBN 0-87421-491-2
- Hone, William (1826), The Every Day Book, Or, A Guide to the Year, London: Hunt & Clarke
- Langeslag, Paul S. (2015), Seasons in the Literatures of the Medieval North, Woodbridge: Boydell & Brewer, ISBN 978-1-843-84425-9
- Malcolmson, Robert W. (1973), Popular Recreations in English Society 1700-1850, London: Cambridge University Press, ISBN 0-521-20147-0
- Peacock, Mabel (1904), "Notes on the Stamford Bull-Running", Folklore, 15 (2): 199–202, doi:10.1080/0015587x.1904.9719402
- Pegge, Samuel (1773), "The Bull-running, at Tutbury, in Staffordshire, considered", Archaeologia, 2 (1): 86–91, doi:10.1017/s0261340900015563
- Plot, Robert (1686), The Natural History of Stafford-Shire, Oxford: Theater
- Simpson, Jacqueline; Roud, Stephen (2000), A Dictionary of English Folklore, Oxford: Oxford University Press, ISBN 978-0-192-10019-1
- Walsh, Martin W. (1996), "November Bull-Running in Stamford, Lincolnshire" (PDF), The Journal of Popular Culture, 30 (1): 233–247, doi:10.1111/j.0022-3840.1996.00233.x, hdl:2027.42/73551
