= Stamford bull run =

Bull-running event in Lincolnshire, England (to 1839)

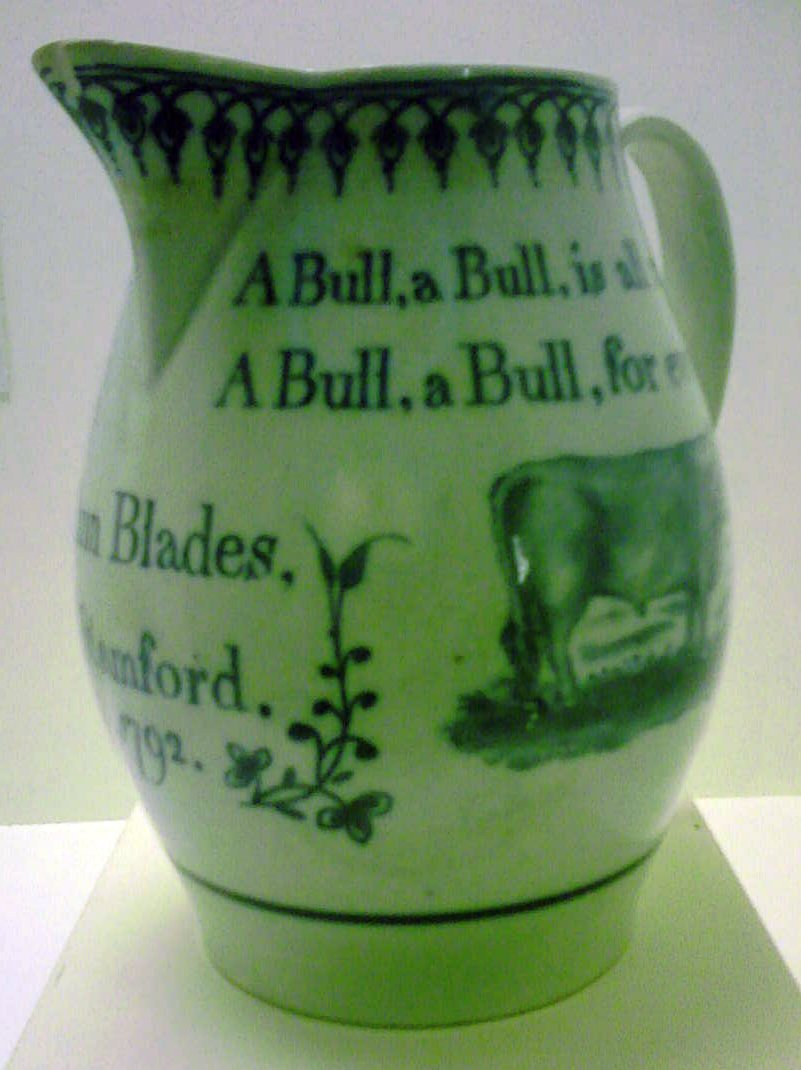
A 1792 jug commemorating Ann Blades, a Stamford bull runner

The Stamford bull run was a bull-running and bull-baiting event in the English town of Stamford, Lincolnshire. It was held on St Brice's Day (13 November), for perhaps more than 600 years, until 1839. A 1996 Journal of Popular Culture paper refers to the bull run as a festival, in "the broader context of the medieval if not aboriginal festival calendar", though works written during and shortly after the activity's later years variously describe it as a "riotous custom", a "hunt", an "old-fashioned, manly, English sport", an "ancient amusement", and – towards its end – an "illegal and disgraceful ... proceeding".

Attempts to suppress the Stamford bull run began in 1788, the year the Tutbury bull run was brought to an end. Other bull-running events had earlier been held in Axbridge, Canterbury, Wokingham and Wisbech.

== Origins ==
Folklore in Stamford maintained that the tradition was begun by William de Warenne, 5th Earl of Surrey, during the reign of King John (1199—1216). The story, recorded by Richard Butcher in his The Survey and Antiquitie of Stamford Towne (1646), and described by Walsh as "patently fictional", relates how Warenne:

...was looking out of his castle window one 13 November and spied out on the meadow two bulls fighting over a cow. The Stamford butchers then came with their dogs to part the bulls, enraging them further and causing them to stampede through the town tossing about men, women and children. Earl Warenne joined the wild mêlée on horseback and so enjoyed himself that he gave to the butchers of Stamford that piece of mating ground, thereafter called "Bull-meadow", on condition that they replicate the event yearly thereafter. (Note: Walsh writes of the story: "[T]he most this actually tells us is that Stamford's folk-imagination (if we can talk of such a thing) could not imagine anything earlier than the reign of King John.")

The town of Stamford acquired common rights in the floodplain next to the River Welland, which until the last century was known as Bull-meadow, and today just as The Meadows.

The earliest documented instance of bull running appears in 1389, among guild records collected by Joshua Toulmin Smith. The document from Stamford's 'Gild of St Martin' states that "on the feast of St. Martin, this gild, by custom beyond reach of memory, has a bull; which bull is hunted by dogs, and then sold; whereupon the bretheren and sisteren sit down to feast." The phrase "custom beyond reach of memory" leaves uncertain whether the custom pre-dated the guild (which was established by 1329).

== Training ==
Training of bulls appears to have occurred in some cases. The Derby Mercury reported "Some training of bulls appears to have taken place. On Saturday the 20th Instant, Mr. Nottingham, at Hardwick Lodge in Rutland, having a Bull in Training for the Yearly Diversion of Bull-Running at Stamford, was unhappily gored to Death in miserable manner by the said Bull, as he was practising with him in the Field alone."

== The event ==
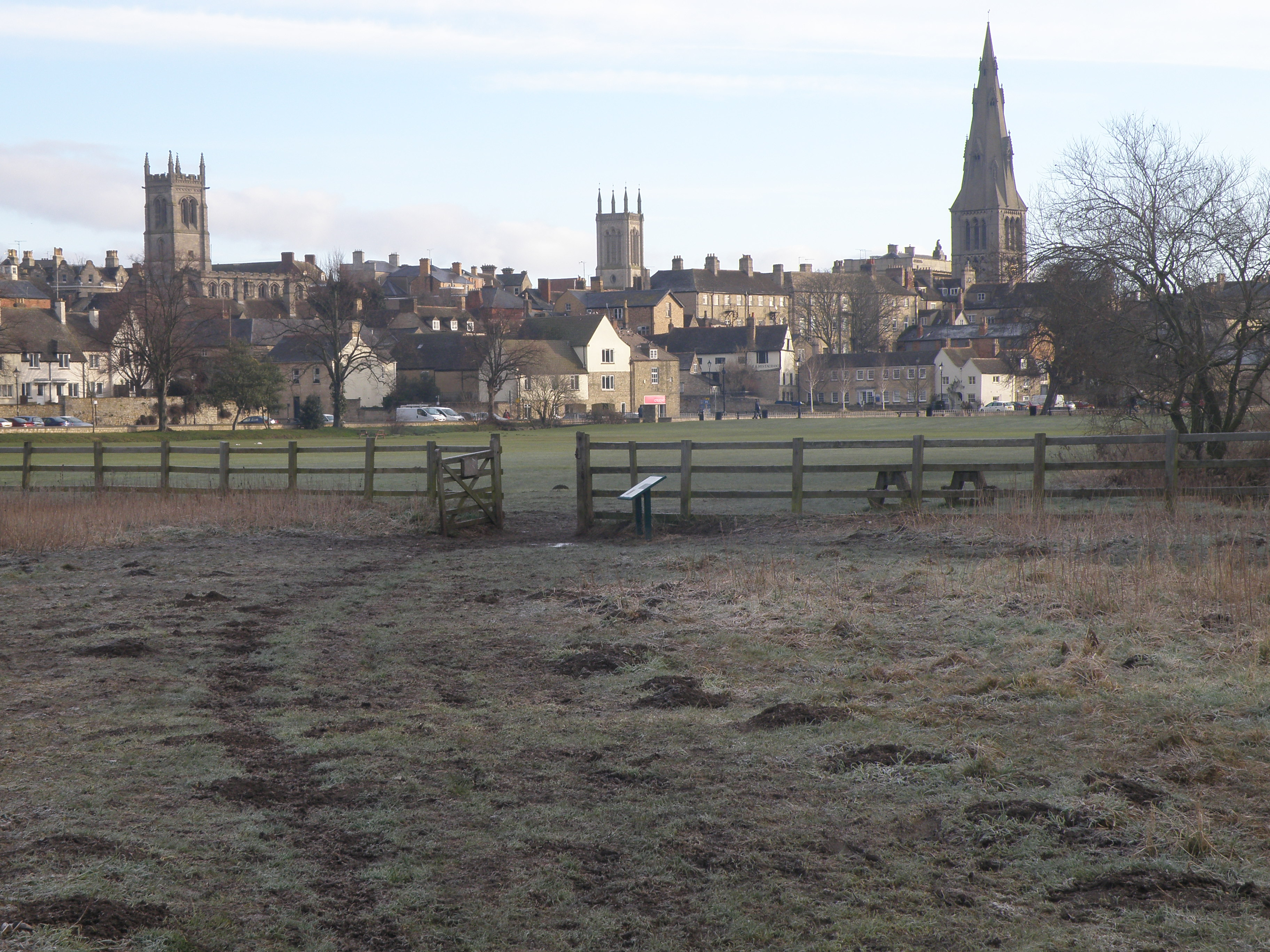
The Meadows, Stamford

The ringing of St Mary's Church bells at 10.45 am opened the event, announcing the closing and boarding of shops and the barricading of the street with carts and wagons. By 11 am crowds gathered and the bull was released, baited by the cheering of the crowd, and (among other things) a man who would roll towards it in a barrel. It was then chased through the main street and down to Bull-meadow or into the River Welland. It was caught, killed and butchered. Its meat was provided to the poor and as such the custom by the 1700s was supported as a charity by donations.

Seventeenth-century historians described how the bull was chased and tormented for the day before being driven to Bull-meadow and slaughtered. "Its flesh [was] sold at a low rate to the people, who finished the day's amusement with a supper of bull-beef."

Towards the end of the 18th century there were calls in the Stamford Mercury for it to cease. "Monday last being our annual bull-running, the same was observed here with the usual celebrity-—Several men heated with liquor got tossed by the bull, and were most terribly hurt, while some others those sober had little better usage.—What a pity it is, so barbarous a custom is permitted to be continued, that has no one good purpose to recommend it ; but is kept as a day of drunkenness and idleness, to the manifest injury of many poor families, even tho’ the men escape bodily hurt." Ten years later the death of Thomas Tavernor, Stamford, was reported "in consequence of the bruises he received at the late Bull-running there."

The 1827 report stated "The Stamford annual bull-running was on Tuesday but little distinguished from those of most former years. The animal was a small, young thing, and had but little notion of or indeed taste for attacking a man. To dogs, however, he showed an instinctive aversion, and some of them flew about like shuttlecocks, when slipped at him in the meadows in the afternoon, one of which he drowned in combat in the river. The usual quantum of pugilistic rencontres took place, and a more than necessary quantum of dirt was jerked at the wives and daughters of the tradesmen, in their chamber windows, as the bullards led their victim through the streets to his slaughter-house. This is a naughty, ungallant usage, Messieurs the Bullards, and ought to be abated."

Mabel Peacock noted that "a second bull was frequently subscribed for and run in some of the streets on the Monday after Christmas."

== Bullards' Song ==
Versions of the song of the Stamford bullards are recorded from at least 1846.

Come all you bonny boys
Who love to bait the bonny bull,
Who take delight in noise,
And you shall have your belly-ful.
On Stamford's town bull-running day,
We'll show you such right gallant play;
You never saw the like, you'll say,
As you shall see at Stamford.

Earl Warren was the man
That first began this gallant sport;
In the castle he did stand
And saw the bonny bulls that fought.
The butchers with their bulldogs came,
These sturdy, stubborn bulls to tame,
But more with madness did inflame;
Enraged, they ran through Stamford.

Delighted with the sport,
The meadows there he freely gave;
Where these bonny bulls had fought,
The butchers now do hold and have;
By charter they are strictly bound
That every year a bull be found:
Come, dight your face, you dirty clown,
And stump away to Stamford.

Come, take him by the tail, boys -
Bridge, bridge him if you can;
Prog him with a stick, boys,
Never let him quiet stand.
Through every street and lane in town
We'll chevy-chase him up and down:
You sturdy bungstraws ten miles around
Come stump away to Stamford.

== Suppression ==
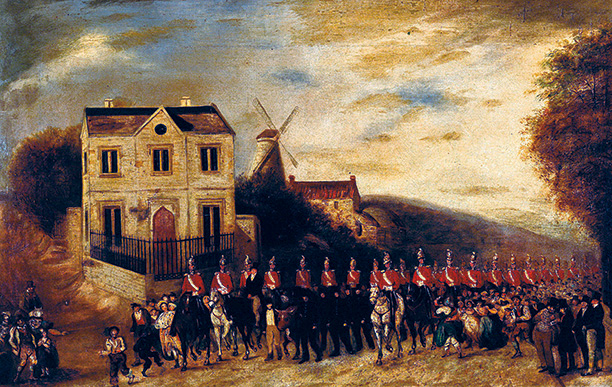
A painting showing the 5th Dragoon Guards heading down the Great North Road to suppress the bull run in 1839

The event was a time of drunken disorder. The custom was periodically suppressed and eventually ended in the 19th century. The annual 15 August bull running in Tutbury, which was more violent and included mutilation of the bull, was ended by the Duke of Devonshire in 1788. The same year, an unsuccessful attempt was made to stop the Stamford event and again the following year. The bull running in Stamford was the subject of an 1833 campaign by the Society for the Prevention of Cruelty to Animals. Some Stamford residents defended their ancient custom as a "traditional, manly, English sport; inspiring courage, agility and presence of mind under danger." Its defenders argued that it was less cruel and dangerous than fox hunting, and a local newspaper asked "Who or what is this London Society that, usurping the place of constituted authorities, presumes to interfere with our ancient amusement?" A riot trial in July 1837 tried only five men and convicted three; William Haycock, John Pearson and Richard for participating in the Bull running in November 1836. John Pearson was a private in the 6th regiment of Carbineers. This inspired some in the town to plan a bigger event for the next year. The mayor of Stamford – at the direction of and with the support of the Home Secretary – used 200 newly sworn-in special constables, some military troops, and police brought in from outside, to stop the bull run of 1837, but it happened anyway. The bull and the people ran through the security line, a riot ensued, and in the end no one was killed (not even the bull, which turned out to have been supplied by or stolen from a local lord, discreetly unnamed in contemporary reports).

The last bull run of Stamford was in 1839, in the face of an even larger force of soldiers and constables – some of the latter of whom smuggled the bull in themselves. The run was short, with the bull being captured by the peace-keeping forces quickly and without reported serious incident. The Cambridge Advertiser reported, "A striking instance of the way in which the Grand Jury laws operate to prevent public investigation, lately occurred at Stamford. In that corrupt place there has long existed a barbarous, disgusting, and disgraceful exhibition, called bull-running, which takes place annually on a given day. All the exertions of the Government and the local Magistracy to suppress this abominable nuisance, (for such it really is to all the respectable inhabitants,) have hitherto proved unavailing. The exhibition question took place on November last, when the usual riotous and disorderly proceedings occurred. Indictment against some the parties who took the most prominent part in the proceeding was preferred at the late borough sessions, when, although the evidence was, we understand, of the most clear and decisive character, a majority of the Grand Jury voted for throwing out the bill, which was accordingly done; and thus, for the present at any rate, further investigation is prevented."

Because the townsfolk were forced to bear the cost of this militia presence for several years in a row, they agreed to stop the practice on their own henceforth, and kept their word. The last known witness of the bull running was James Fuller Scholes who spoke of it in a newspaper interview in 1928 before his 94th birthday:

I am the only Stamford man living who can remember the bull-running in the streets of the town. I can remember my mother showing me the bull and the horses and men and dogs that chased it. She kept the St Peter's Street – the building that was formerly the Chequers Inn at that time and she showed me the bull-running sport from a bedroom window. I was only four years old then, but I can clearly remember it all. The end of St Peter's Street (where it was joined by Rutland Terrace) was blocked by two farm wagons, and I saw the bull come to the end of the street and return again.

== Legacy ==
As late as 1895 at J. S. Loweths, the mayor of Stamford's, civic banquet, a string band played a piece of music entitled Stamford Bull Running arranged by A Rippon.

== See also ==
- Bull running
- Cruelty to Animals Act 1835

== Notes and references ==
Notes

Bibliography

- Peacock, Mabel (1904), "Notes on the Stamford Bull-Running", Folklore, 15 (2): 199–202, doi:10.1080/0015587x.1904.9719402
- Walsh, Martin W. (1996), "November Bull-Running in Stamford, Lincolnshire" (PDF), The Journal of Popular Culture, 30 (1): 233–247, doi:10.1111/j.0022-3840.1996.00233.x, hdl:2027.42/73551
