= Richard Butcher =

Richard Butcher may refer to:

- Richard Butcher (antiquary) (1583–c. 1665), English antiquary
- Richard Butcher (footballer) (1981–2011), English footballer
- Ricky Butcher, a fictional character in EastEnders

== See also ==
- Butcher (surname)
