= Battle of Bull Run =

Battle of Bull Run (used by the Union) or the Battle of Manassas (used by the Confederacy) may refer to two conflicts during the American Civil War:

== Battles ==
- First Battle of Bull Run, July 21, 1861
- Second Battle of Bull Run, August 28–30, 1862

== Other ==
- The Battles of Bull Run, a boardgame wargame
- The Battle of Bull Run (film), 1913 film directed by Francis Ford
- The Battle of Manassas, a 19th century composition by composer Blind Tom Wiggins

== See also ==
- Battle of Manassas Gap, in 1863
- Manassas Station Operations, August 25–27, 1862
- Manassas National Battlefield Park, location of the two conflicts in Prince William County, Virginia
- Manassas (disambiguation)
- Bull Run (disambiguation)
