= Benjamin Brook =

English nonconformist minister and religious historian

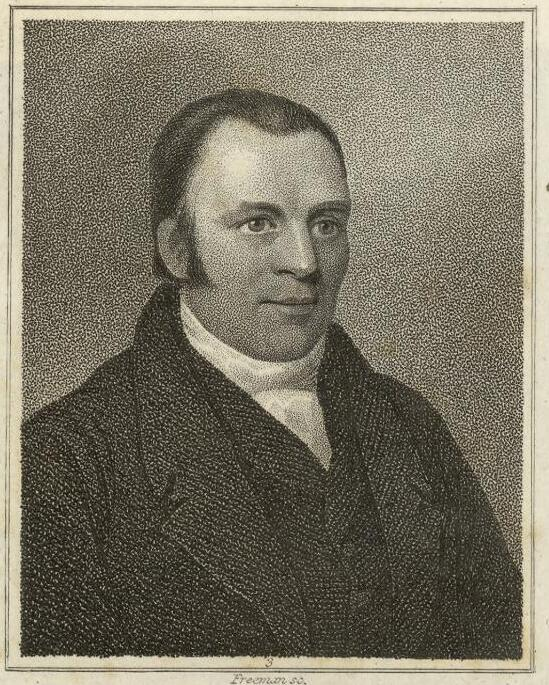
- A portrait from the Welsh Portrait Collection at the National Library of Wales. Depicted person: Benjamin Brook – English nonconformist minister
- Born: 1776
- Died: 1848 (aged 71–72)
- Occupations: Nonconformist minister and Religious historian

Benjamin Brook (1776–1848) was an English nonconformist minister and religious historian.

== Life ==
He was born at Netherthong, near Huddersfield. When young he was admitted to membership in the independent church at Holmfield, under the Rev. Robert Gallond. In 1797 he entered Rotherham College as a student for the ministry. In 1801 he became the first pastor of the congregational church at Tutbury, Staffordshire.

He pursued studies into puritan and nonconformist history and biography. Resigning his ministerial duties in 1830, from failing health, he lived at Birmingham, still continuing his studies, and publishing. Alexander Gordon in the Dictionary of National Biography comments that Brook was a better biographer than historian. He was a member of the educational board of Springhill College, opened August 1838. At the time of his death he was collecting materials for a history of puritans who emigrated to New England. He died at the Lozells, then outside Birmingham, on 5 January 1848, at the age of 72. He is said to have been one of the last who retained among the congregationalists the old ministerial costume of shorts and black silk stockings.

== Works ==
He published:

- Appeal to Facts to justify Dissenters in their Separation from the Established Church, 2nd ed. 1806, (3rd ed. 1815, with title Dissent from the Church of England justified by an Appeal to Facts).
- The Lives of the Puritans . . . from the Reformation under Q. Elizabeth to the Act of Uniformity, in 1662, 1813, 3 vols.
- The Reviewer reviewed, 1815, in answer to an article in the Christian Observer on the Lives, Volume 14, pp. 386–406.
- The History of Religious Liberty from the first Propagation of Christianity in Britain to the death of George III, 1820, 2 vols.
- Memoir of the Life and Writings of Thomas Cartwright, B.D. . . . including the principal ecclesiastical movements in the reign of Q. Elizabeth, 1845.
