= Listed buildings in Tutbury =

Tutbury is a civil parish in the district of East Staffordshire, Staffordshire, England. It contains 35 listed buildings that are recorded in the National Heritage List for England. Of these, two are listed at Grade I, the highest of the three grades, one is Grade II*, the middle grade, and the others are at Grade II, the lowest grade. The parish contains the large village of Tutbury and the surrounding countryside. The most important of the listed buildings are Tutbury Castle and St Mary's Church. The majority of the listed buildings are in the village, and most of these are houses, cottages and shops. Also in the village are a hotel, two buildings that originated as chapels, and a telephone kiosk. Outside the village are farmhouses, a manor house, a mill and a mill house, and a milepost.

== Key ==
Grade	Criteria
I	Buildings of exceptional interest, sometimes considered to be internationally important
II*	Particularly important buildings of more than special interest
II	Buildings of national importance and special interest

== Buildings ==
Name and location	Photograph	Date	Notes	Grade
St Mary's Church; 52.85912°N 1.68789°W		Early 12th century	Originally a priory church, it has been altered and expanded during the following centuries. The tower probably dates from the 16th century, the north aisle was added in 1820–22, and in 1866 G. E. Street replaced the chancel and sanctuary. It is built in stone with a slate roof, and consists of a nave with a clerestory, north and south aisles, a chancel with an apse, and a south tower with an embattled parapet and corner pinnacles. The west doorway has seven orders, the outermost order in alabaster. The doorway in the south aisle is Norman and in its tympanum is a carving depicting a boar hunt.	I
Tutbury Castle; 52.85923°N 1.69077°W		12th century	The oldest surviving part of the castle, which is in ruins, is the chapel. The northeast gateway dates from the early 14th century, and the rest is from the 15th century and later. These parts include the south tower of 1442–50, the north tower from the 1450s, and the king's lodgings of 1631–35, which provides the present entrance. There is also a folly keep dating from after 1760. The remains are a scheduled monument.	I
Dog and Partridge Hotel; 52.85720°N 1.68566°W		Late 15th to early 16th century	Originally a coaching inn, it was extended in the 18th century. The original part is timber framed with brick infill on a stone plinth, the extensions are in red brick, and the roof is tiled. The original part has three storeys and an attic, and three bays, the top storey jettied. In the ground floor is a bay window, elsewhere in the main block the windows are casements, in the wings they are a mix of casements and sashes, and there are two gabled dormers.	II*
Fauld Hall; 52.85797°N 1.72712°W		Late 16th century	A manor house, possibly with an earlier core, it was later altered and extended. The original part is timber framed with brick infill, the later parts are in brick, and the roof is tiled. Originally a hall and a cross-wing, the alterations have resulted in a plan of a long cross. There are two storeys, with a wing of two storeys and an attic, and a two-storey porch, the upper storey jettied. The windows are casements, and there are gabled dormers.	II
33 High Street; 52.85757°N 1.68500°W	—	17th century (probable)	The house was refronted in the 19th century. It is in red brick with dentilled eaves and a tile roof. There are three storeys and three bays. In the centre is a doorway with a radial fanlight, and a gabled hood on curved brackets, and the windows are sashes. To the left is a round-headed entry.	II
28 Ludgate Street; 52.85646°N 1.68656°W	—	17th century	A brick cottage with a timber framed core, the lower storey stuccoed and the upper storey painted, with dentilled eaves and a tile roof. The windows are three-paned casements, those in the ground floor with segmental heads, and the doorway has a plain surround and a segmental head.	II
Castle Hayes Park Farm House; 52.84581°N 1.71173°W	—	17th century	The farmhouse was later altered, it is in brick and has a tile roof with coped gables. There are two storeys and an attic. and four bays, the left bay projecting slightly and with a gable. The doorway has a plain surround, there is a gabled porch, the windows are casements, and there are three gabled dormers.	II
7 High Street and adjoining house 52.857505°N 1.68552°W		Early 18th century (probable)	A pair of stuccoed houses with bands, moulded cornices, and tile roofs. The left house is the older and is recessed. It has a parapet, two storeys and three bays, a doorway with a plain surround to the right, and sash windows. The house to the right dates from the late 18th century, it has two storeys and a symmetrical front of three bays. The central doorway has reeded pilasters, a radial fanlight and a pediment, and it is flanked by bow windows.	II
Tutbury Mill and House; 52.85638°N 1.67169°W		Early 18th century	The former corn mill and attached house are in brick with tile roofs, and both have three storeys. The house has a hipped roof, three bays, sash windows with keyblocks, and a doorway with a moulded surround and a radial fanlight. The mill has casement windows, and inside is a wooden water wheel with a diameter of 20 feet (6.1 m).	II
1 Duke Street; 52.85683°N 1.68649°W		18th century	A Post Office and house on a corner site in red brick with a tile roof. There are three storeys, and four bays curving round the corner. In the ground floor is a shop front with a doorway, flanked by multi-paned windows with reeded pilasters and an entablature. To the right is a smaller doorway with a semicircular fanlight, and the other windows are of varying types.	II
1 and 2 High Street; 52.85696°N 1.68648°W	—	18th century	A house and a shop in brick with rendering and a tile roof. There are two storeys and an attic, and three bays, and the windows are sashes. No. 1 has a modern shop front and a box dormer, and No. 2 has a doorway with Tuscan pilasters and a rectangular fanlight.	II
3 High Street; 52.85702°N 1.68642°W	—	18th century	A brick shop with a tile roof, two storeys and an attic, and one bay. In the ground floor is a modern shop front with pilasters and a cornice, and to the left is a doorway with pilasters, a rectangular fanlight and a cornice hood. The upper floor contains a casement window with a segmental head, and above is a box dormer.	II
4 High Street; 52.85709°N 1.68631°W	—	18th century	The building is in brick with a tile roof, three storeys and three bays. In the ground floor are shop fronts with an entry between. The upper floors contain windows of various types, including sashes, and the central window in the middle floor is blocked.	II
1 Castle Street; 52.85711°N 1.68821°W		Late 18th century	A red brick house with a cornice, a parapet, and a tile roof. There are three storeys and three bays. The central doorway has a moulded architrave and an entablature on console brackets. The windows are sashes, those in the upper two storeys with projecting keyblocks and bracketed sills.	II
6 and 6A High Street; 52.85737°N 1.68593°W	—	Late 18th century	A house with an extension to the left, now a separate house, they are in red brick with tile roofs and sash windows. The house is on a plinth and has a sill band, and a moulded eaves cornice. There are three storeys and five bays, the middle bay slightly projecting under a pediment. The central doorway is in Venetian style, and there is a radial fanlight, and a cornice on consoles. The extension is slightly recessed, it has two storeys, three bays, a modern shop front, and to the left are a segmental-headed entry and a carriage entrance.	II
10A High Street; 52.85780°N 1.68510°W	—	Late 18th century	A brick house with dentilled eaves, a tile roof, two storeys, and three bays. The middle bay is recessed under a semicircular arched head, and in the ground floor is a three-light sash window. In the right bay of the ground floor is a doorway with a semicircular head, in the left bay is a semicircular-headed recess, and in the upper floor are sash windows.	II
5 Lower High Street; 52.85883°N 1.68475°W	—	Late 18th century	A warehouse with a shop in the ground floor, it is in red brick on a corner site with a dentilled eaves cornice and a slate roof. There are three storeys and a curved front of four bays. In the ground floor is a modern shop front, above the doorway is a loading door, and over that is a round-headed window. These are flanked by multi-pane windows, and in the right bay the windows are blind.	II
19 Lower High Street; 52.85841°N 1.68398°W		Late 18th century	A brick shop with moulded stuccoed eaves and a slate roof. There are two storeys and four bays, the right bay projecting slightly. In the ground floor are modern shop fronts, and the upper floor contains sash windows.	II
5 Monk Street; 52.85760°N 1.68769°W	—	Late 18th century	A red brick house with dentilled eaves, and a tile roof with coped gables. There are two storeys and two bays. The central doorway has a bracketed hood, and the windows are later casements.	II
Croft House; 52.85694°N 1.68754°W	—	Late 18th century	A Georgian house with a hipped tile roof. There are three storeys, three bays, and an extension to the ground floor of the left bay. The central doorway has engaged Doric columns, a moulded surround, a radial fanlight, and a pediment. The windows are sashes, those in the middle bay with moulded architraves.	II
Riverdale; 52.85876°N 1.68388°W	—	Late 18th century	A red brick house with a moulded eaves cornice and a slate roof. There are three storeys and three bays. The doorway has engaged Doric columns, a segmental fanlight and an entablature, and the windows are sashes.	II
10 High Street; 52.85772°N 1.68527°W	—	c. 1810	A red brick house with a slate roof, three storeys, and three bays. The central doorway has engaged Doric columns, a radial fanlight, and a pediment, and the windows are sashes. On the right is a round-headed entry.	II
11 High Street; 52.85785°N 1.68510°W	—	c. 1810	A red brick house that has a slate roof with coped gables, three storeys, and three bays. The central doorway has engaged Doric columns, a radial fanlight, and a pediment, and the windows are sashes. On the left is a flat-headed entry.	II
8–10 Duke Street; 52.85681°N 1.68710°W	—	Early 19th century	A row of three brick houses with dentilled eaves and a tile roof. There are three storeys and five bays. The doorway to No. 8 has a plain surround, No. 9 has a doorway with reeded pilasters, a rectangular fanlight, a cornice on console brackets, and the doorway of No. 10 has plain pilasters, a rectangular fanlight, and a hood. The windows are sashes with plain lintels.	II
5 High Street; 52.85720°N 1.68618°W	—	Early 19th century	A shop and a house in brick with dentilled eaves and a tile roof. There are two storeys and five bays. In the ground floor is a modern shop front, and to the left is a doorway with a moulded surround, pilasters, and a rectangular fanlight. The windows are sashes.	II
22–24 High Street; 52.85806°N 1.68423°W		Early 19th century	A row of two houses and a shop in red brick with a moulded eaves cornice and a tile roof. There are three storeys and three bays. In the ground floor is a modern shop front and two doorways, each with pilasters, a fanlight and a cornice hood, and the windows are sashes with plain lintels.	II
34 High Street; 52.85745°N 1.68503°W	—	Early 19th century	A red brick house with a slate roof, three storeys and three bays. The central doorway has pilasters, a rectangular fanlight, and an entablature, and the windows are sashes with plain lintels.	II
35 High Street; 52.85708°N 1.68580°W		Early 19th century	A house in plastered brick that has a slate roof with coped gables. There are two storeys and three bays. In the centre is a round-headed recess containing a round-headed door with a radial fanlight, and the windows are sashes.	II
Chapel House Farm House; 52.84747°N 1.69471°W	—	Early 19th century	A brick farmhouse with string courses and a hipped slate roof. There are two storeys and five bays, the middle three bays projecting slightly under a pediment. The doorway has a moulded surround, a rectangular fanlight and an entablature, and the windows are sashes.	II
Milepost at SK 224 270; 52.84047°N 1.66810°W		Early 19th century	The milepost is on the southwest side of the A511 road. It is in cast iron and has a triangular plan and an inclined head. It is inscribed with "ROLLESTON PARISH" and the distances to London, to Tutbury and to Burton.	II
The Hawthorns; 52.85852°N 1.68517°W		Early 19th century	A stuccoed house with a hipped slate roof. There are two storeys and a front of five bays, the right two bays recessed. The doorway has a moulded surround with pilasters and a radial fanlight, and the windows are sashes.	II
Wesleyan Methodist Chapel; 52.85767°N 1.68461°W		1838	The chapel is in red brick with the gabled front facing the street. The front has three bays, the middle bay projecting slightly. The gable has dentilled eaves, and contains an inscribed plaque. In the centre is a protruding gabled porch, the outer bays contain tall round-headed windows with keystones, and there is a smaller, similar window above the porch.	II
The Charity Offices; 52.85709°N 1.68686°W	—	1844	At one time a soup kitchen, the building is in brick with stone dressings, bands, moulded eaves, and a hipped slate roof. There are two storeys and three bays, the middle bay slightly projecting. The central doorway has a stone surround and a cornice hood on consoles, and the windows are sashes with stone lintels and sills.	II
Tutbury Institute: northwest block 52.85797°N 1.68422°W		c. 1900	The hall was originally built as a Methodist chapel, and later used as a meeting hall. It is in red brick with quoins, a band, and with its gable end facing the street. The gable has dentilled eaves and contains a clock face. There are two storeys and three bays, and the windows are sashes with channelled lintels.	II
Telephone kiosk 52.85696°N 1.68642°W	—	1935	A K6 type telephone kiosk, designed by Giles Gilbert Scott. Constructed in cast iron with a square plan and a dome, it has three unperforated crowns in the top panels.	II
