= Radio minstrel =

Minstrel performers on radio in the US and Australia

Radio minstrels were entertainers (minstrels) whose shows consisted of comic skits, variety acts, and music performed by people heard on radio, especially during the pre television years.

== United States ==
=== Early development ===
By the 1920s, radio minstrel shows began appearing on the American radio, usually as musical performers who traveled to different cities doing concerts. As radio stations increased their airtime to fill all day, 7 days per week, demand increased for musicians who could entertain the audience. Radio stations used similar performers at other stations throughout the Midwest and into Tennessee. These migrating minstrels were a mainstay of programming for the rural independent broadcaster. Musicians regularly moved between stations in search of greener concert pastures with better booking potential.

=== Height ===
The rise of radio minstrel shows occurred on live locally programmed community radio stations. They broadcast content that was popular and relevant to their local/specific audience. During the 1920s and 1930s the majority of stations functioned as independent stations but there was little study on the types of content they aired. It is commonly believed that almost all programming of the era came through the networks with local stations acting as signal repeaters because broadcasts on local stations were produced live and went unrecorded in either sound or paper form. Thus, it can be difficult to obtain information about programming at the local station levels.

=== Characters ===
The earliest minstrel performers were locally popular. During the beginning of the 1930s, Gene Autry was an American performer who became fame as 'The Singing Cowboy on the radio. In 1929, Autry signed a recording deal with Columbia Records. For four years, he worked in Chicago, Illinois, on the WLS-AM radio show called National Barn Dance, where he met singer-songwriter Smiley Burnette.

Lester “Smiley” Burnett, for example, began performing and announcing on WDZ. By 1933, he had variety shows, including a broadcasting show for children. Then the creation of other shows became available. His radio performances gained him notice and he went on to work with Gene Autry in radio first, but then later in film where he ended up as a supporting actor in many of Autry's movies.

Other artists like The Kentuckians were not paid for their appearance on radio stations in the early years, WDZ had formed an artists' bureau with booking agents to promote live performances by station talent. These performances were for a fee and provided the groups with income. This attracted musicians to the station who stayed as long as their bookings were good. It is their presence on the radio that increased demand for hearing them in concert.

In their earliest years, stations like WOAW, Omaha, and KVOO, Tulsa, as well as both KMA and KFNF in Shenandoah, Iowa, utilized amateur performers who would perform for free, but this alone would not promote continuity of programming if there were not some benefit to the performers in the long run such as money from concert bookings. One station sought to enhance artist appearances by setting up an agreement with a tent owner to set up and move his tent to various locations where station talent would perform. In exchange, the station provided talent and gave free promotion of where the tent was to be each day. This would have provided the acts with at least a somewhat regular place to appear. However, it didn't draw well so the venture was short lived.

== Australia ==
From 1932 until the 1960s, Melbourne radio station 3DB broadcast The Minstrel Show every Thursday evening, and it was relayed to Major Broadcasting Network affiliates, as well as some independent Australian stations.

== See also ==
- Two Black Crows
- Sam 'n' Henry
- Amos 'n' Andy
- History of broadcasting
- History of radio
