= Minstrel =

Type of entertainer in medieval Europe

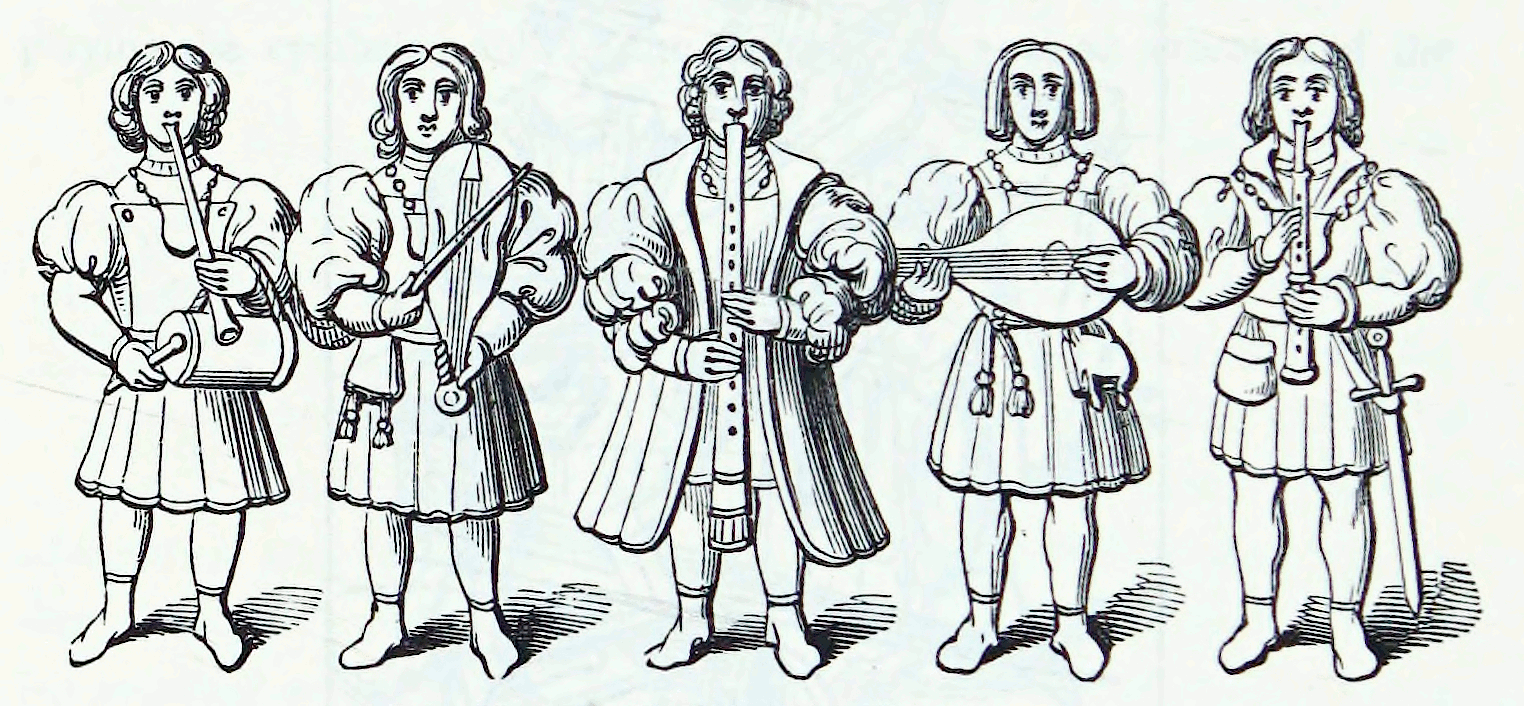
The Minstrels of Beverley. Woodcut of 16th-century English musicians. Left to right: pipe and tabor, fiddle, windcap instrument, lute, and shawm.

A minstrel was an entertainer, initially in medieval Europe. The term originally described any type of entertainer such as a musician, juggler, acrobat, singer or fool; later, from the sixteenth century, it came to mean a specialist entertainer who sang songs and played musical instruments.

== Description ==
Minstrels performed songs which told stories of distant places or of existing or imaginary historical events. Although minstrels created their own tales, often they would memorize and embellish the works of others. Frequently they were retained by royalty and high society. As the courts became more sophisticated, minstrels were eventually replaced at court by the troubadours, and many became wandering minstrels, performing in the streets; a decline in their popularity began in the late 15th century. Minstrels fed into later traditions of travelling entertainers, which continued to be moderately strong into the early 20th century, and which has some continuity in the form of today's buskers or street musicians.

Initially, minstrels were simply treats at court, and entertained the lord and courtiers with chansons de geste or their local equivalent. The term minstrel derives from Old French ménestrel (also menesterel, menestral), which is a derivative from Italian ministrello (later menestrello), from Middle Latin ministralis "retainer", an adjective form of Latin minister, "attendant" from minus, "lesser".

In Anglo-Saxon England before the Norman Conquest, the professional poet was known as a scop ("shaper" or "maker"), who composed his own poems, and sang them to the accompaniment of a harp. In a rank much beneath the scop were the gleemen, who had no settled abode, but roamed about from place to place, earning what they could from their performances. Late in the 13th century, the term minstrel began to be used to designate a performer who amused his lord with music and song. Following a series of invasions, wars, conquests, etc., two categories of composers developed. Poets like Chaucer and John Gower appeared in one category, wherein music was not a part. Minstrels, on the other hand, gathered at feasts and festivals in great numbers with harps, fiddles, bagpipes, flutes, flageolets, citterns and kettledrums. Additionally, minstrels were known for their involvement in political commentary and engaged in propaganda. They often reported news with bias to sway opinion and revised works to encourage action in favor of equality. The Heege Manuscript, transcribed in the English Midlands around 1480 by Richard Heege, may offer a sample of the humor favored by some medieval minstrels at festivals.

The music of the troubadours and trouvères was performed by minstrels called joglars (Occitan) or jongleurs (French). As early as 1321, the minstrels of Paris were formed into a guild. A guild of royal minstrels was organized in England in 1469. Minstrels were required to either join the guild or abstain from practising their craft. Some minstrels were retained by lords as jesters who, in some cases, also practised the art of juggling. Some were women or women who followed minstrels in their travels. Minstrels throughout Europe also employed trained animals, such as bears. Minstrels in Europe died out slowly, having gone nearly extinct by about 1700, although isolated individuals working in the tradition existed even into the early 19th century.

== In literature ==
Minstrelsy became a central concern in English literature in the Romantic period and has remained so intermittently.

In poetry, The Lay of the Last Minstrel (1805) by Sir Walter Scott, Lalla Rookh (1817) by Thomas Moore, and The Village Minstrel (1821) by John Clare were three of many. Novels centring on minstrelsy have included Helen Craik's Henry of Northumberland (1800), Sydney Owenson's The Novice of St Dominick's (a girl using a minstrel disguise, 1805), Christabel Rose Coleridge's Minstrel Dick (a choirboy turned minstrel becomes a courtier, 1891), Rhoda Power's Redcap Runs Away (a boy of ten joins wandering minstrels, 1952), and A. J. Cronin's The Minstrel Boy (priesthood to minstrelsy and back, 1975).

== See also ==
- Bard
- Ashik
- Court of Minstrels
- Kobzar
- Gusans
- Jester
- Minstrels' gallery
- Minstrel show
- Radio minstrel
- Skald
- Troubadour
