= Bullrun Rally =

The Bullrun Rally is an annual automobile rally of over 100 mainly exotic vehicles, with drivers from all around the world. Cars are typically highly modified exotics or restored classics and compete over seven days, traversing 3,000 to 4,000 miles. The Bullrun route changes each year but always takes place in North America.

== Founders ==
The Bullrun rally and brand creators are former investment banker Andy Duncan, and his cousin David Green - both originally from the United Kingdom. They were originally involved with the Gumball 3000 car rally in Europe and moved to the US to set up the Bullrun rally as a USA-based annual event. They created a spin-off TV show based on the rally and were executive producers of both the Bullrun Reality Show and a documentary about the rally, Cops, Cars and Superstars.

== History ==
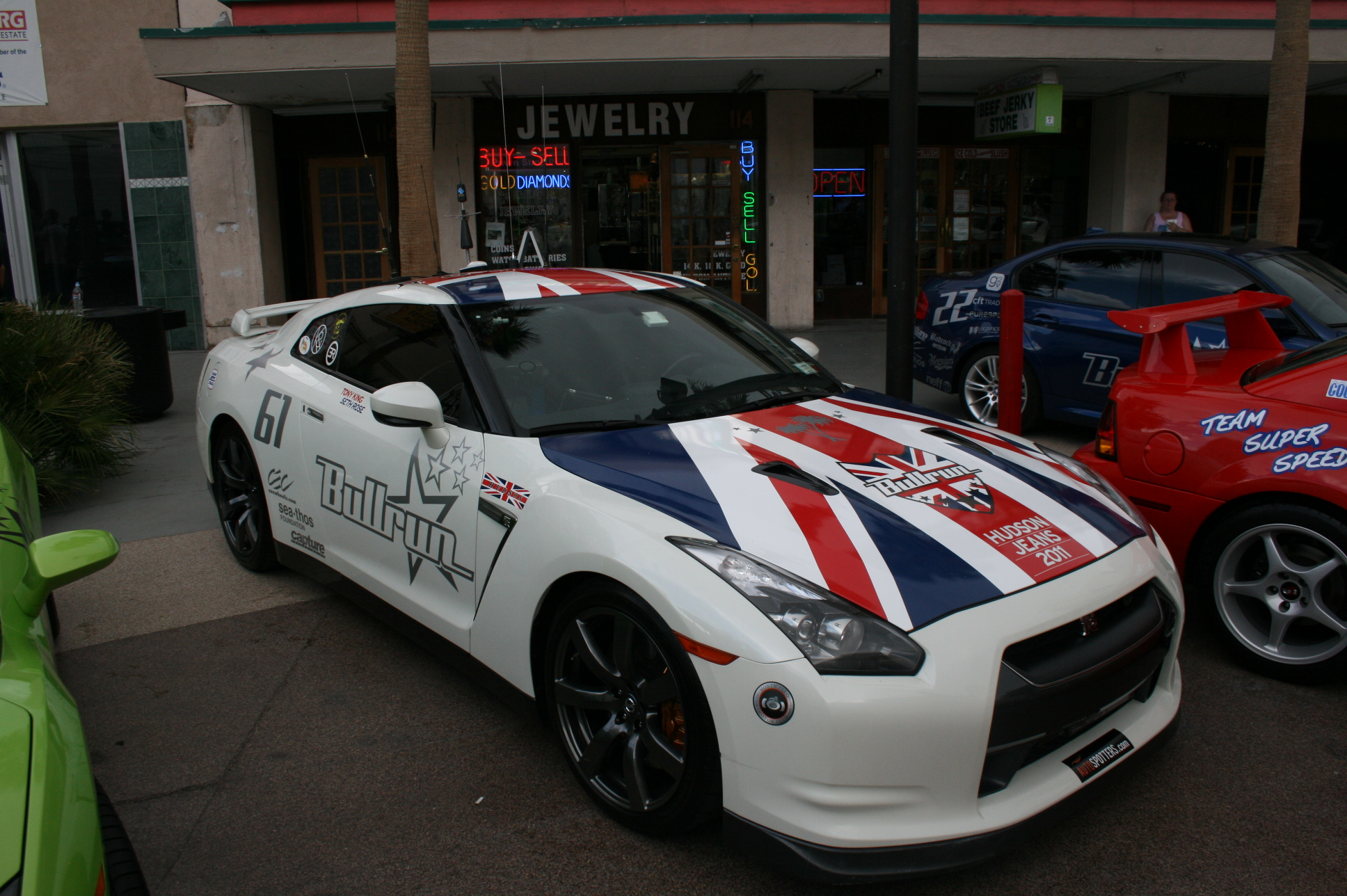
Team Exotic Rally's 2011 Navigator Award Winning Nissan GTR

The Bullrun rally first started in June 2004 and ran from Hollywood, Los Angeles to Miami. Entry is by invitation only, with entry fees being as much as $20,000 per car depending on the rally event. In 2007, the rally owners created and produced a spin-off TV series, Bullrun Reality Show, based on the rally.

== Arrests ==
Penalties for speeding on the rally have reached up to $10,000 for individual offences. Arrests were common occurrences amongst the drivers; on average a driver went to jail every day of each event. The rally often became a cat and mouse game each year between the drivers trying to evade detection and the police trying to 'catch a Bullrunner'. The police across the USA have implemented road blocks, used helicopters and arrested drivers en masse in an attempt to stop the rally.

== Rallies ==
- 2014: New York to Scottsdale
- 2013: Montreal to New Orleans, 10 Year Anniversary
- 2012: Los Angeles to Los Angeles
- 2011: Las Vegas to Miami.
- 2010: New York City to Las Vegas.
- 2009: NY to Austin Tx.
- 2008: Calgary to Scottsdale.
- 2007: Montreal to Key West.
- 2006: New York to Los Angeles.
- 2005: Los Angeles to Los Angeles.
- 2004: London to Ibiza - special edition.
- 2004: Los Angeles to Miami.

== Awards ==
The Bullrun Navigator Award is given to the team that has the best overall navigation for the Rally's entire seven days. Other awards include The Spirit of Bullrun Award and Bullrun Order of Merit.

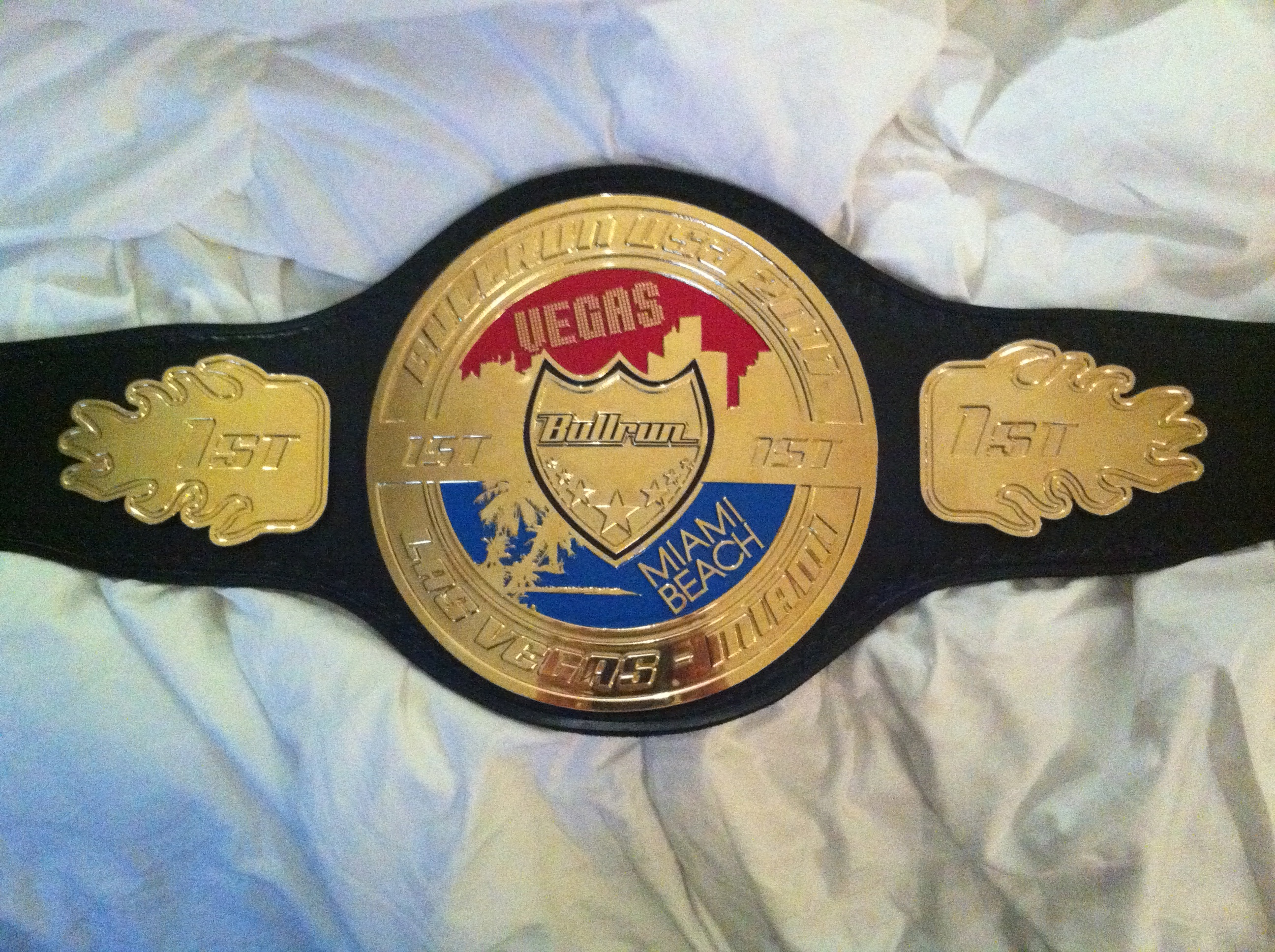
Seth Rose's Award Belt for 1st place

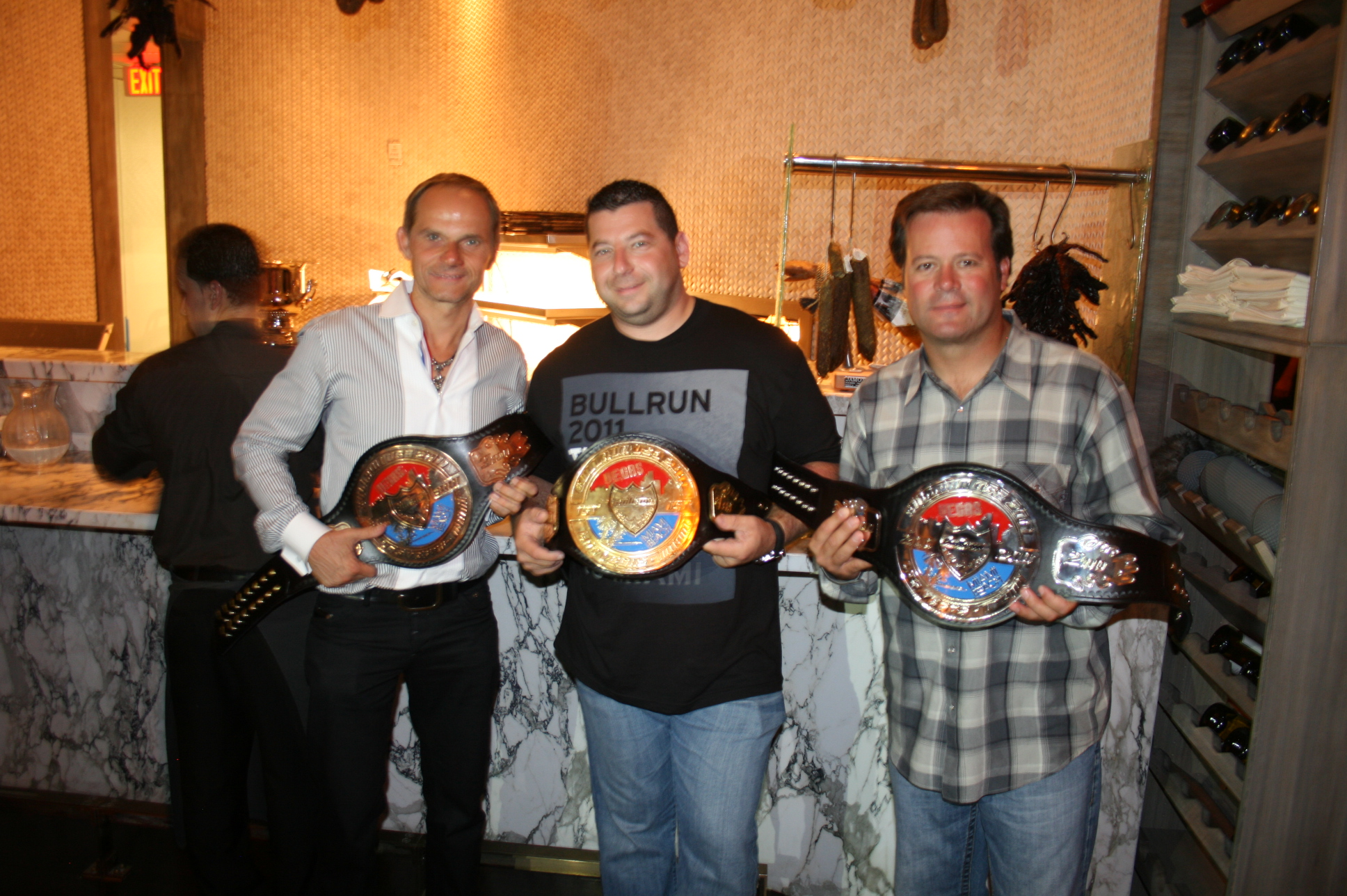
2011 Bullrun Navigator award winners

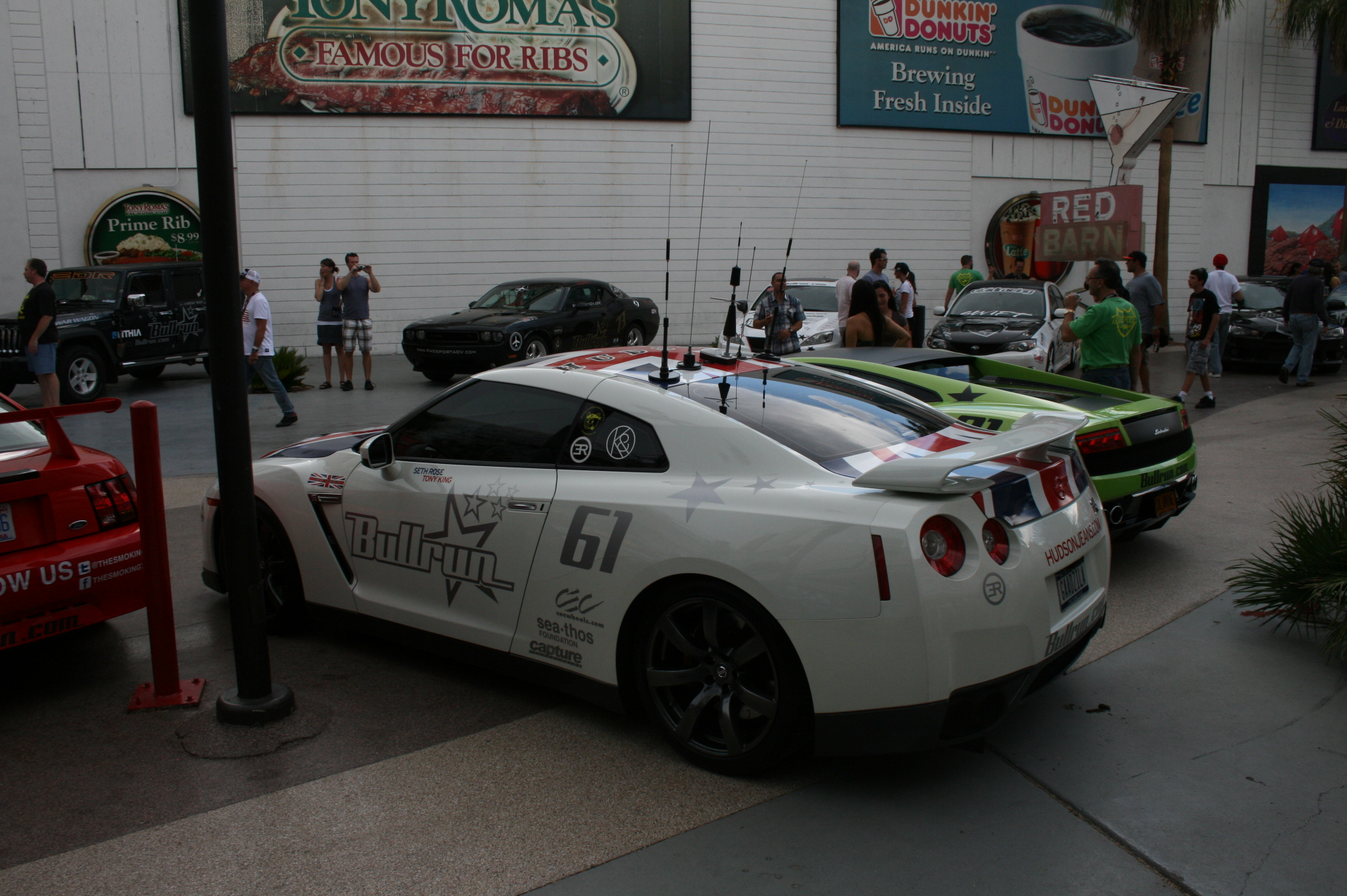
Team Exotic Rally's Nissan GTR
