= Operation Bull Run =

- Part of the Post-invasion Iraq (Operation Phantom Thunder)
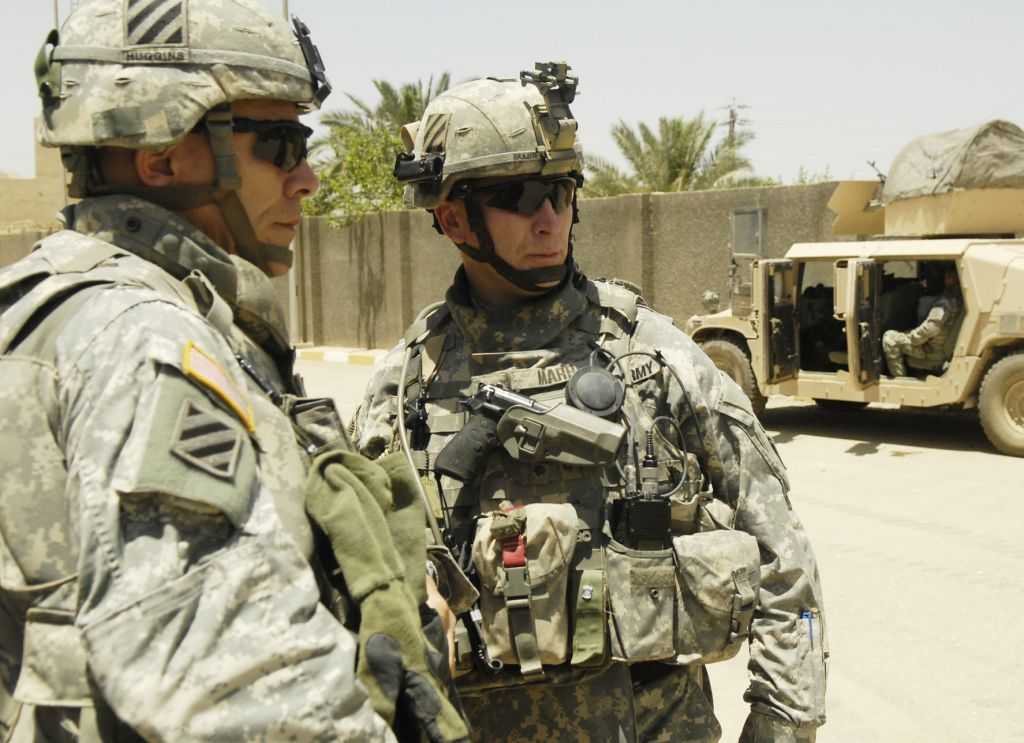
- American troops conduct Operation Bull Run
Date	24 June 2007 – 26 June 2007
Location	Iraq
Result	U.S. military raids successful; Disruption of insurgent supply lines

Belligerents
United States (Iraq) New Iraqi Army	Islamic State of Iraq; Other Iraqi insurgents

Commanders and leaders
General Rick Lynch (Task Force Marne); Colonel Terry Ferrell (2-3BCT); Colonel Wayne W. Grigsby Jr. (3-3HBCT)	

Strength
3000 (2000 Coalition, 1000 Iraqi)	Unknown

Casualties and losses
1 KIA	4–7 captured, 2 killed

Operation Bull Run was a 48-hour-long military operation during the occupation of Iraq that began on 24 June 2007 in Al Dura'iya. A joint operation between the US Army's 1st Battalion, 15th Infantry of the 3rd Heavy Brigade and the Iraqi National Police and Iraqi Army, the operation netted four to seven captured insurgents and two killed. Launched from Forward Operating Base Hammer, it formed part of Operation Marne Torch, clearing insurgent sanctuaries to the southeast of Baghdad, and in addition to the insurgents killed and captured, it liberated three separate caches of artillery rounds, mortars, firearms and ammunition, along with propaganda and cell phones.

On 27 June 2007, following the conclusion of the operation the previous day, the Official News Website for Operation Iraqi Freedom released a news bulletin on Operation Bull Run.
