= Brice of Tours =

5th-century Frankish bishop

Saint Brice
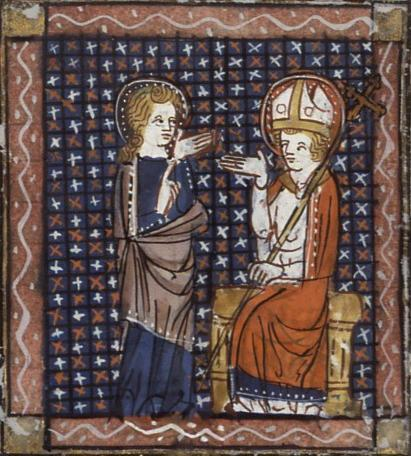
- Saint Brice and Saint Martin of Tours
- Born: c. AD 370
- Died: AD 444
- Venerated in: Eastern Orthodox Church; Roman Catholic Church; Anglican Communion
- Canonized: pre-congregation
- Feast: 13 November

Brice of Tours (Latin: Brictius; (Note: Also scribed as Bricius, Britius, Brixius, Briktius, or Briccius.) c. 370 – 444 AD) was a 5th-century Frankish bishop, the fourth Bishop of Tours, succeeding Martin of Tours in 397.

== Background ==
Brice was a contemporary of Augustine of Hippo and lived in the time of the Council of Ephesus. Gaul was part of the Roman Empire, where Christianity was the official state religion since the end of the 4th century, and was in the process of advanced Christianization. However, the Western Roman Empire was already very close to collapse, and in the course of the migration of peoples in the fifth century, various Germanic empires formed; the time was politically rather uncertain.

== Early life ==
According to legend, Brice was an orphan. He was rescued by Bishop Martin and raised in the monastery at Marmoutier. He became Martin's pupil, although the ambitious and volatile Brice was rather the opposite of his master in temperament. Brice became a monk and later, Martin's archdeacon.

In one account, when Martin prophesied that Brice would become his successor as bishop, but would have many difficulties. The clerics of Tours, where the thought of such a bishop did not arouse enthusiasm, asked Martin to send the troublemaker away; but Martin replied: "If Christ could put up with Judas, why should I not put up with Brice?" It is said that Brice left the monastery "to live with beautiful horses in his stables and pretty slaves in his house."

== Career ==
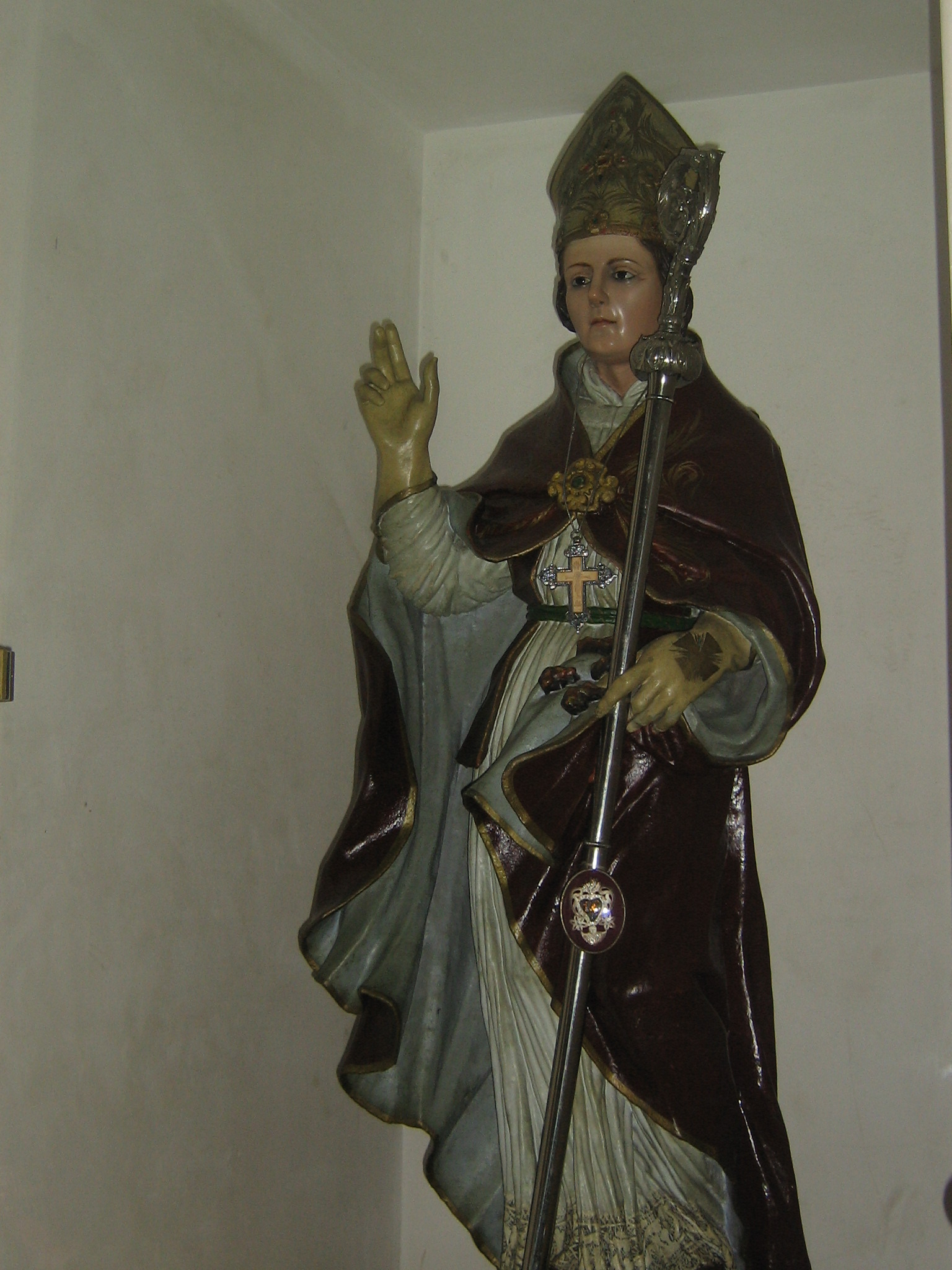
Saint Brice, Calimera

When Martin died in 397, Brice succeeded him as Bishop of Tours. Brice performed his duties, but was also said to succumb to worldly pleasures. He was repeatedly accused of secular ambition, and various other mistakes during this time, but church official investigations each time released him.

In the thirtieth year of his episcopate, a nun who was a washerwoman in his household gave birth to a child that, owing to calumny, was rumored to be his. He submitted to a ritual of carrying hot coals in his cloak to the tomb of St. Martin, showing the unburned cloak as proof of his innocence. The people of Tours, however, did not believe him and forced him to leave Tours or be stoned by them. He could return only after he had traveled to Rome and been absolved of his sins by the Pope.

After seven years of exile in Rome, Brice returned to Tours, completely exonerated by the pope. During his absence several other bishops had been appointed to Tours; but when he came back, the last of them had just died and Brice resumed his duties. He built a chapel dedicated to Saints Peter and Paul to protect the tomb of his predecessor Martin.

He served with such humility that on his death in November 444 he was venerated as a saint.

== Veneration ==
Brice is described in various biographies as a controversial figure. Church historians see in the various relevant legends an expression of the tensions between the regular clergy and the secular priests in Tours at that time. His bones were transferred by Gregory of Tours to Clermont and are now in the church of San Michele in Pavia. Churches were named after him.

=== Feast day ===
His memorial day is 13 November. The killing of the Danes in England on 13 November 1002 is called the St Brice's Day massacre.

In the town of Stamford in Lincolnshire, 13 November, St Brice's Day, was traditionally the day that a bull-running took place.

=== Iconography ===
Brice is depicted as a bishop, with glowing coals in his robe or with a baby in his arms.

== Sources ==
- Sulpicius Severus: Dialogi III, 15 (online)
- Gregory of Tours, History of the Franks Book II Chap.1
