= Bull Run Creek =

Stream in South Dakota, United States

Coordinates: 44°51′26″N 102°50′43″W

Bull Run Creek is a stream in the U.S. state of South Dakota.

Bull Run Creek was named for an incident when a runaway bull roamed the area.

== See also ==
- List of rivers of South Dakota
