= USNS Bull Run =

History

United States
- Name: USNS Bull Run
- Namesake: First and Second Battles of Bull Run
- Builder: Sun Shipbuilding and Dry Dock Co.
- Laid down: 13 March 1943
- Launched: 29 June 1943
- Stricken: 23 September 1957
- Fate: Sold for scrap, 23 April 1981

General characteristics
- Type: T2-SE-A1 tanker
- Displacement: 5,782 long tons (5,875 t) light; 21,880 long tons (22,231 t) full
- Length: 523 ft 6 in (159.56 m)
- Beam: 68 ft (21 m)
- Draft: 30 ft (9.1 m)
- Propulsion: Turbo-electric, single screw, 8,000 hp (5,966 kW)
- Speed: 15.5 knots (28.7 km/h; 17.8 mph)
- Capacity: 140,000 barrels (22,000 m^{3})
- Complement: 251

SS Bull Run was a type T2 tanker built at Sun Shipbuilding and Drydock Co. in Chester, PA as hull number 287 and USMC number 362 in 1943. In 1956, the ship was acquired by the US Navy from the Maritime Administration, assigned to MSTS, and placed in-service as the USNS Bull Run (T-AO-156). She left the navy in 1957, going back to the Maritime Administration. In 1969, the stern of the Bull Run was attached to the bow of the Type C4 ship the Anchorage, and the completed ship then retained the name Anchorage. The bow of the Bull Run was then scrapped.
