= St Mary's Church, Tutbury =

St Mary’s Church, Tutbury
- The Priory Church of St Mary, Tutbury
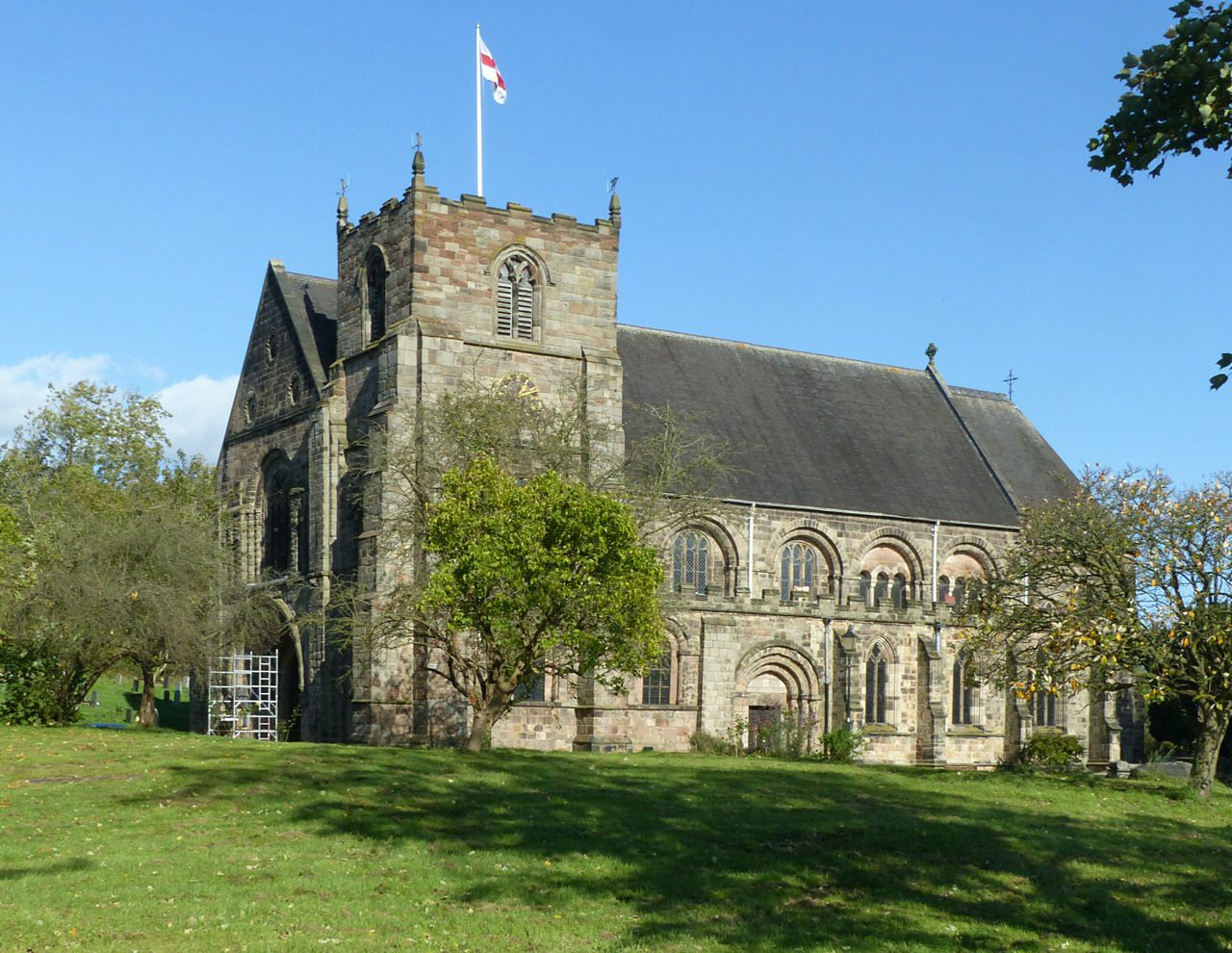
- St Mary’s Church, Tutbury
- St Mary’s Church, Tutbury
- 52°51′31.68″N 1°41′18.11″W
- OS grid reference: SK 21118 29107
- Location: Tutbury, Staffordshire
- Country: England
- Denomination: Church of England
- Website: stmarystutbury.org

History
- Dedication: St Mary the Virgin

Architecture
- Heritage designation: Grade I listed
- Designated: 1964

Administration
- Diocese: Diocese of Lichfield
- Archdeaconry: Stoke-on-Trent
- Deanery: Tutbury
- Parish: Tutbury

Clergy
- Vicar: vacant

St Mary's Church, Tutbury, is a Grade I listed parish church in the Church of England in Tutbury, Staffordshire.

== History ==
The West front of the church, the oldest surviving part of the building, is dated from around 1160 - 1170. At that time the church was used by the monks of Tutbury Priory, as well as the being the parish church of Tutbury. However, the monastery appears to have been founded slightly later than the church.

Most of the nave was rebuilt in the 13th century. At the Reformation the eastern part of the church, which served the monastic community, was demolished along with the priory buildings. The South tower appears to be a 16th-century addition. The north aisle is an addition of 1820-2 by Joseph B H Bennett. The chancel and sanctuary were replaced in 1866 by George Edmund Street funded by Sir Oswald Mosley (4th baronet and grandfather of the fascist politician).

== Memorials ==
Indoors, the church has a memorial to George Robinson (d. 1837) by Joseph Hall of Derby.

The churchyard contains the war graves of seven Commonwealth service personnel, five from World War I and two from World War II.

== Bells ==
The tower contains a ring of eight bells, with four dating from 1699. The tenor weighs a little over 10 cwt.

== Organ ==
The church has an organ by William Hill & Son in 1860, which was rebuilt by Lloyd of Nottingham, Adkins of Derby in 1937 and Poyser, Adkins' successor, in 1980. A specification of the organ can be found on the National Pipe Organ Register.

== Picture Gallery ==
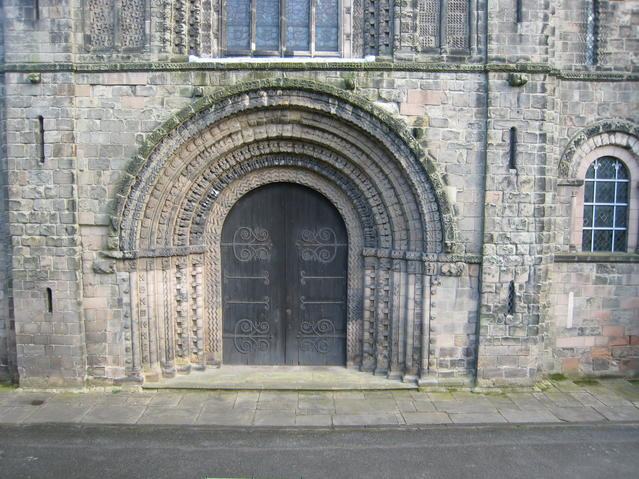
The Norman West Doorway, Tutbury Church

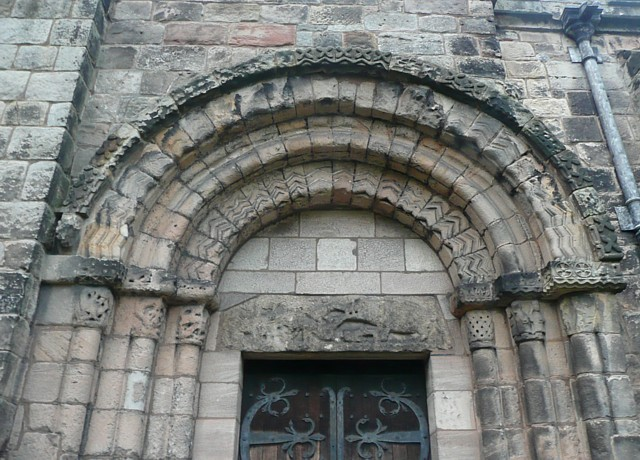
Arch of South Doorway, showing a boar hunt on the lintel

== See also ==
- Grade I listed buildings in Staffordshire
- Listed buildings in Tutbury
