= The Battles of Bull Run =

The Battles of Bull Run, subtitled "Manassas – June 1861 and August 1862", is a board wargame published by Simulations Publications Inc. (SPI) in 1972 that contains two American Civil War simulations covering the First Battle of Bull Run in 1861, and the Second Battle of Bull Run in 1862.

== Background ==
Shortly after the start of the American Civil War, a badly-trained and inexperienced Union army attempted to march from Washington D.C. to the Confederate capital of Richmond. They were intercepted beside a stream called Bull Run near the city of Manassas by an equally inexperienced Confederate army. At first the Union forces prevailed, but the arrival of Confederate reinforcements threw the Union soldiers into a panic, and they retreated in disorder back to Washington. Fourteen months later, Union forces were lured into a trap near the same battle site, and again retreated in disorder.

== Description ==
The Battles of Bull Run is a two-player game in which the Confederate player tries to recreate the victories of 1861 and 1862 at Bull Run, and the Union player tries to change history.

=== Components ===
The game includes:

- 22" x 28" paper hex grid map. Each hex is numbered.
- 200 die-cut counters
- various charts and player aids

=== Movement ===
Unlike the traditional "I Go, You Go" system where one player moves their face up counters and resolves combat, then the other player has the opportunity to do the same, Battles of Bull Run uses a hidden and simultaneous movement system in which both players turn all of their units face-down. They also have the option of adding "dummy" units into their forces as a subterfuge. For the first turn, each player then writes down the exact route through each numbered hex that each counter will take. The turn is divided up into segments; in the first segment, all units that the players planned to move are moved forward one hex. If enemy units end up adjacent to one another, units are flipped face-up to reveal their strength and combat is resolved. (If one of the counters is a dummy, then it is removed from the board.) In the next segment, any units that are not now engaged in combat are moved to their next hex, and combat is resolved. This continues, segment by segment, until all units have been moved as far as the players had planned. The players then plan their movement for the second turn.

=== Scenarios ===
The game comes with five scenarios,:

1. First Battle of Bull Run (each of the three scenarios is eight turns long):
  1. The historical battle
  2. What if the Union army had attacked two days previous, when Confederate reinforcements were not available?
  3. What if there had been an additional Union division?
2. Second Battle of Bull Run (both scenarios are 24 turns long):
  1. The historical battle
  2. Confederate units remain facedown until engaged in combat. Union units remain face-up at all times.

== Publication history ==
Battles of Bull Run was designed by Jim Dunnigan and developed by Irad Hardy and John Young. It was published by SPI in 1973 with graphic design by Redmond A. Simonsen.

One of the early criticisms of the game was that it did not accurately simulate the Union's fractured command structure. In response, SPI designer Albert Nofi published an official variant rule that required five players: One player controlled Confederate forces, while four players divided up command of the Union forces. The Union "generals" could only communicate with each other by written notes, and had to plan and execute their units' movements on their own.

== Reception ==
In his 1977 book The Comprehensive Guide to Board Wargaming, Nicholas Palmer warned of the "hidden and simultaneous movement, hence not for the weak-minded."

In issue 22 of Moves, Mark Saha commented that the game was "a fine collection for beginners, and certainly the best introduction to the SiMove [simultaneous movement] system." He also complimented the five-player variant by Albert Nofi, calling it "a challenge to the most experienced of gamers, who will appreciate the simplistic game mechanics as this allows them more time to denounce their partners, pull out their hair, and retire to another room for a few moments of silent weeping." But he warned that the simultaneous movement system. which had been designed to be "as specific and unambiguous as possible", was "actually rather tedious."
