= Richard Butcher (antiquary) =

English antiquary

- Born: 1586/1587; Stamford
- Died: 1664; Stamford
- Known for: Antiquary

Richard Butcher (1586 or 1587 – 1664) was an English antiquary.

== Life ==
Butcher was a native of Stamford, Lincolnshire, and became town clerk of that borough.

He compiled The Survey and Antiquitie of the Towne of Stamforde, in the county of Lincolne (London 1646; reprinted London 1717; and also with additions by Francis Peck, at the end of his Academia tertia Anglicana; or the Antiquarian Annals of Stanford, London 1727). A manuscript by him, in two volumes, entitled Antiquity revived, is preserved in the library of St John's College, Cambridge. It is a translation from Camden. Butcher's portrait at the age of 61 in 1648 was engraved by Clamp.

Butcher had a wife, Dorothy, with whom he had several children, including a son, Robert, who matriculated aged 17 from St John's College, Cambridge, in 1653, and was ordained at Peterborough in 1663. Richard Butcher died in 1664, and was buried in September at All Saints' Church, Stamford.
