= Tutbury =

Village in East Staffordshire, England

Coordinates: 52.854°N 1.686°W

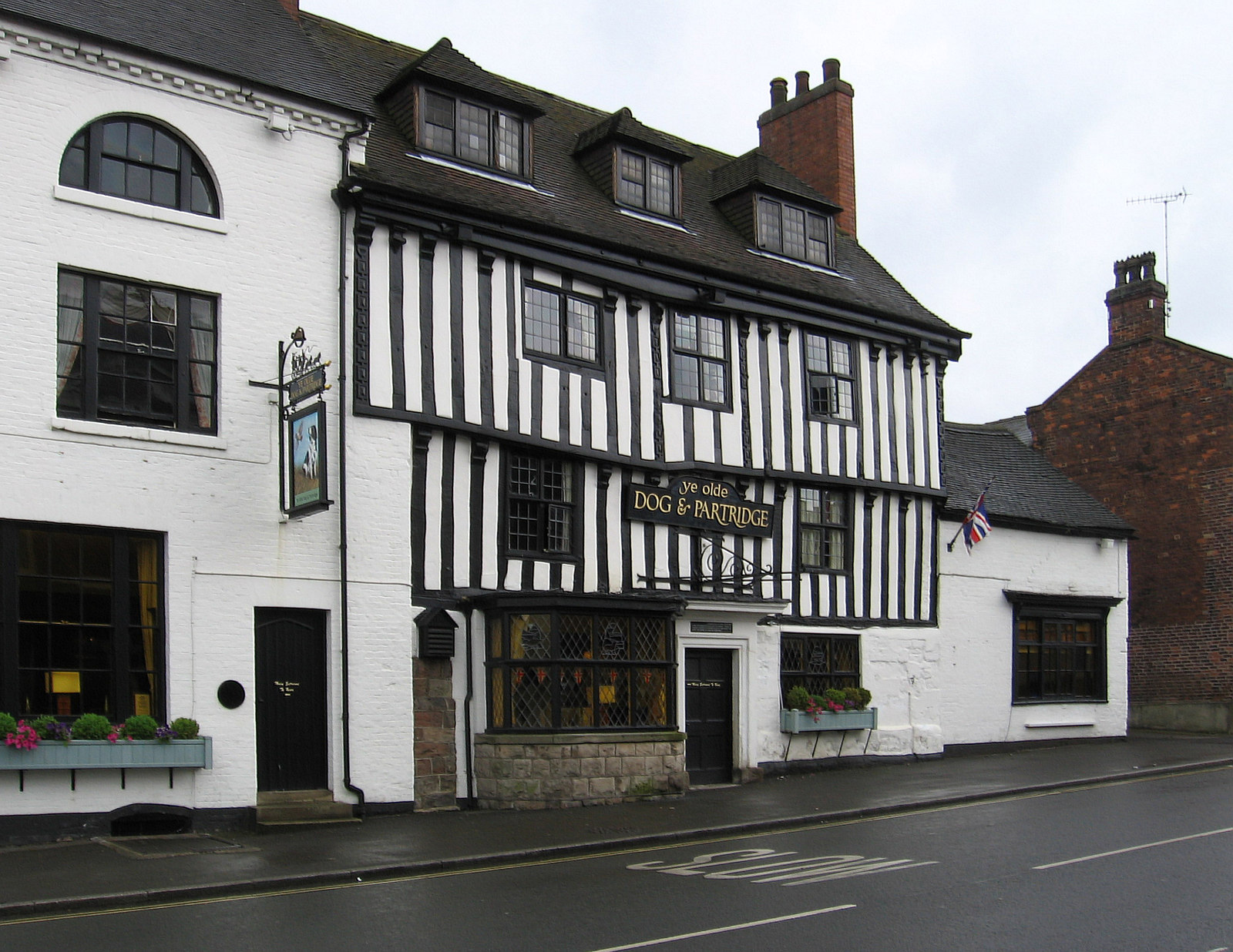
- The Dog & Partridge

- Location within Staffordshire
- Population: 3,076 2011 Census
- OS grid reference: SK211285
- District: East Staffordshire
- Shire county: Staffordshire
- Region: West Midlands
- Country: England
- Sovereign state: United Kingdom
- Post town: BURTON-ON-TRENT
- Postcode district: DE13
- Dialling code: 01283
- Police: Staffordshire
- Fire: Staffordshire
- Ambulance: West Midlands
- UK Parliament: Burton and Uttoxeter

Tutbury is a village and civil parish in East Staffordshire, England. It is 4 miles (6.4 km) north of Burton upon Trent and 20 miles (32 km) south of the Peak District. The village has a population of about 3,076 residents. It adjoins Hatton to the north on the Staffordshire–Derbyshire border.

== History ==
Tutbury is surrounded by the agricultural countryside of both Staffordshire and Derbyshire. The site has been inhabited for over 3,000 years, with Iron Age defensive ditches encircling the main defensive hill, upon which now stand the ruins of the Norman castle. These ditches can be seen most clearly at the Park Pale and at the top of the steep hills behind Park Lane.

The name Tutbury probably derives from a Scandinavian settler and subsequent chief of the hill-fort, Totta, bury being a corruption of burh the Anglo-Saxon name for 'fortified place'.

Tutbury Castle became the headquarters of Henry de Ferrers and was the centre of the wapentake of Appletree, which included Duffield Frith. With his wife Bertha, he endowed Tutbury Priory with two manors in about 1080. It would seem that Tutbury at that time was a dependency of the Norman abbey of St Pierre‑sur‑Dives. St Mary's Church, Tutbury was used by the local population as well as the priory, and it possibly predates the priory itself. Quarries near Tutbury once produced Nottingham alabaster, used for monumental carvings, and the priory church has a door with an alabaster arch (circa 1160) that is the only such arch known in the country.

One of the Royal Studs was established in the area round the castle by Henry VIII but had to be abandoned after the Civil War. Mary, Queen of Scots, was imprisoned in Tutbury Castle in 1569.

Until the 18th century, Tutbury was the site of an annual Court of Minstrels. There was even a "King of the Minstrels" and an annual Tutbury bull run.

There are some fine Georgian and Regency buildings and the half-timbered Dog and Partridge Hotel. There are antique and craft shops in the village, some of which have been run by the same families for many years.

Tutbury and Hatton railway station was opened by the North Staffordshire Railway on 11 September 1848. It then closed during the 1960s but was reopened in 1989. It is on the Crewe to Derby Line.

Until 2006, Tutbury Crystal, a manufacturer of high-quality cut glass products, was based in the village. However, production was transferred to Stoke-on-Trent as the existing factory was very old and was thought to be too small for the modern company's requirements. The old factory was demolished and flats were built on the site, but a factory shop still operates in the village. Despite this, the tourism trade survives thanks to the long history of the church and castle.

== Gallery ==
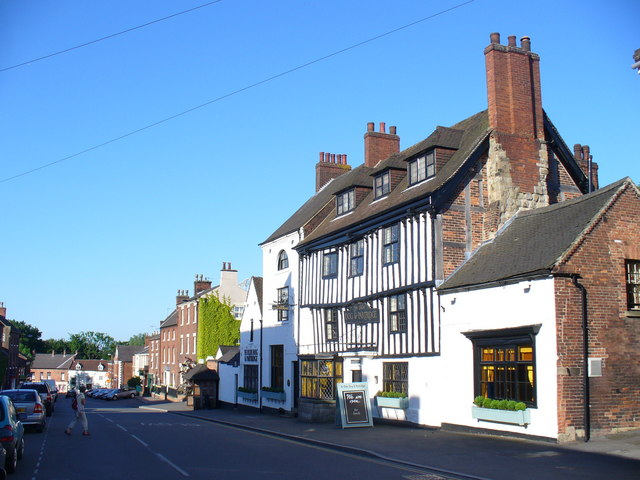
Tutbury High Street

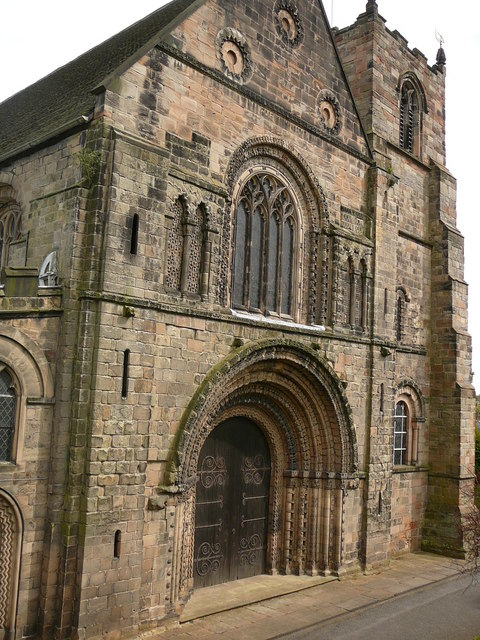
West front of St Mary's Church (circa 1160)

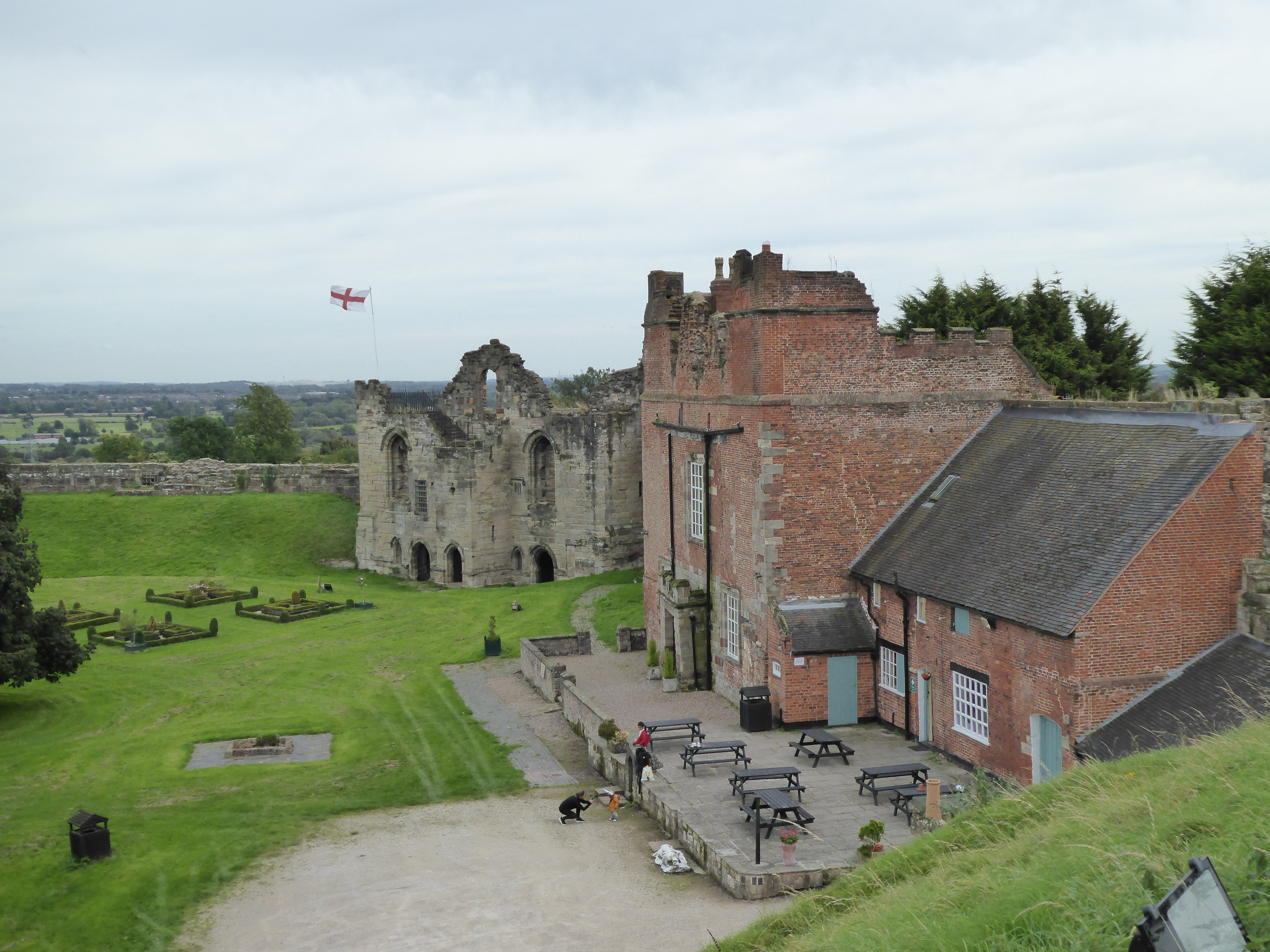
Tutbury Castle

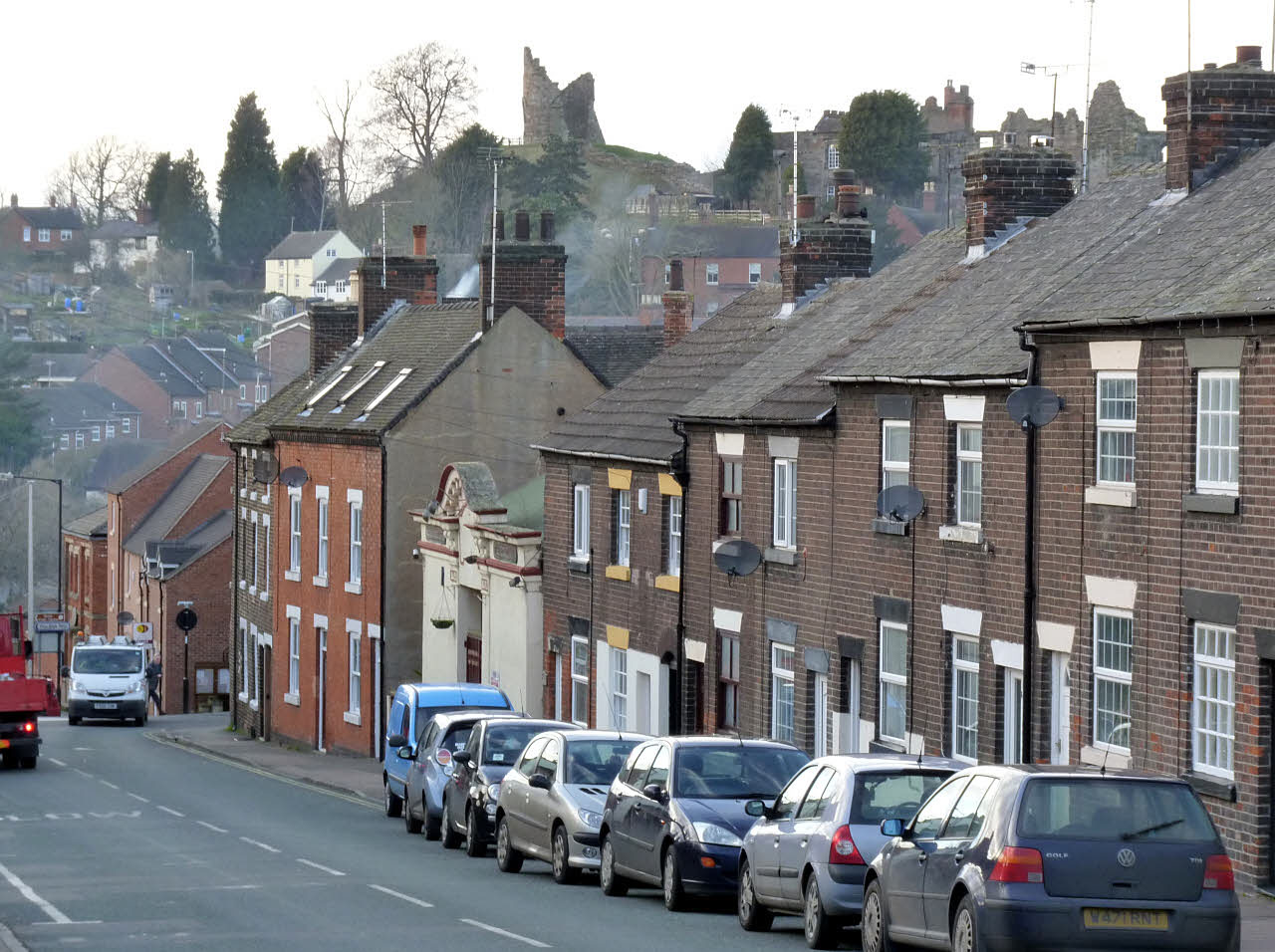
Burton Street, Tutbury

== Media ==
Local news and television programmes are provided by BBC West Midlands and ITV Central. Television signals are received from the Sutton Coldfield TV transmitter.

Local radio stations are BBC Radio Derby and Capital Mid-Counties (formerly Touch FM).

The town's local newspaper is the Burton Mail.

The Natural History of Tutbury, describing the fauna and flora of the district surrounding Tutbury and Burton on Trent, by Sir Oswald Mosley and Edwin Brown, was published in 1863.

Tutbury was featured in the Most Haunted spin-off series Most Haunted: Midsummer Murders, in which the team investigated a murder over hidden treasure.

== Notable people ==
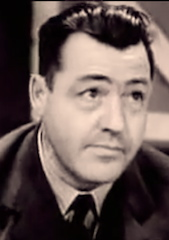
William Staton, 1941

- Henry de Ferrers (fl. 1086), Norman magnate and land owner; founded Tutbury Priory where he was buried.
- William de Ferrers, 3rd Earl of Derby (died 1190), an English earl, lived in Tutbury Castle, and Robert de Ferrers, 6th Earl of Derby (1239–1279), one of his descendants, was born there.
- Ann Moore (1761–1813), the notorious "fasting-woman of Tutbury", claimed to have eaten nothing at all from 1807 to 1813, but her claims were eventually shown to be a hoax; died locally.
- Benjamin Brook (1776–1848), nonconformist minister and religious historian, the first local pastor from 1801.
- Air Vice Marshal William Staton, CB, DSO & Bar, MC, DFC & Bar (1898–1983), airman in WWI and later Japanese PoW in WWII and senior RAF officer, was born in Tutbury.

=== Sport ===
- Walter Lyon (1841–1918), first-class cricketer, moved to Tutbury in 1865 with his younger brother Charles to take over the cotton mill; died in Tutbury.
- John Henry Davies (c. 1864 in Tutbury – 1927), a wealthy British brewery owner who took over Manchester United F.C., then called Newton Heath, in 1902
- Thomas Richardson (1865–1923), a cricketer who played first-class cricket for Derbyshire in 1895, was born and died in Tutbury.
- George Harris (born 1877), footballer who played 71 games, became a pub landlord in Tutbury on retirement.
- Joseph Nelis (1917–1994), Belgian footballer, was born in Tutbury.

== See also ==
- Listed buildings in Tutbury
