= Tutbury Priory =

Monastery in Staffordshire, England

Tutbury Priory was a Benedictine monastery in Tutbury, Staffordshire, England, founded in 1080 by Henry de Ferrers as a dependency of the abbey of Saint-Pierre-sur-Dives in Normandy and completed in 1089, in memory of King William the Conqueror and his wife Queen Matilda of Flanders, also of Henry de Ferrers' own parents, and in thanksgiving for his own family: "in honour of holy Mary, the Mother of God ... and for the soul of King William and Queen Mathilda, and for the health of my father and mother, and my wife Berta, and my sons, Engenulph, William and Robert, and my daughters and all my ancestors and friends."

William, Earl of Derby, had the body of his great-grandfather, the founder of Tutbury, translated and buried on the south side of the high altar of the priory church.

By an unusual set of administrative errors and procedures Tutbury avoided the confiscation of alien priories in 1414 without undergoing formal denization and continued until 1538, when was dissolved during the Reformation. The prior became vicar of Tutbury, and the western part of the priory church was retained as the parish church, St Mary's Church, Tutbury.

The church has a highly praised Norman doorway and other carvings. A historic sundial sits outside, along with a recreation of the stocks that were there before. The graveyard around the church provides reminders of the massive underground explosion at nearby Fauld in 1944, when 68 people died, including Italian prisoners of war.
