= Fiesta de Toros del Señor de Girón =

Festival held each year in Girón, Ecuador

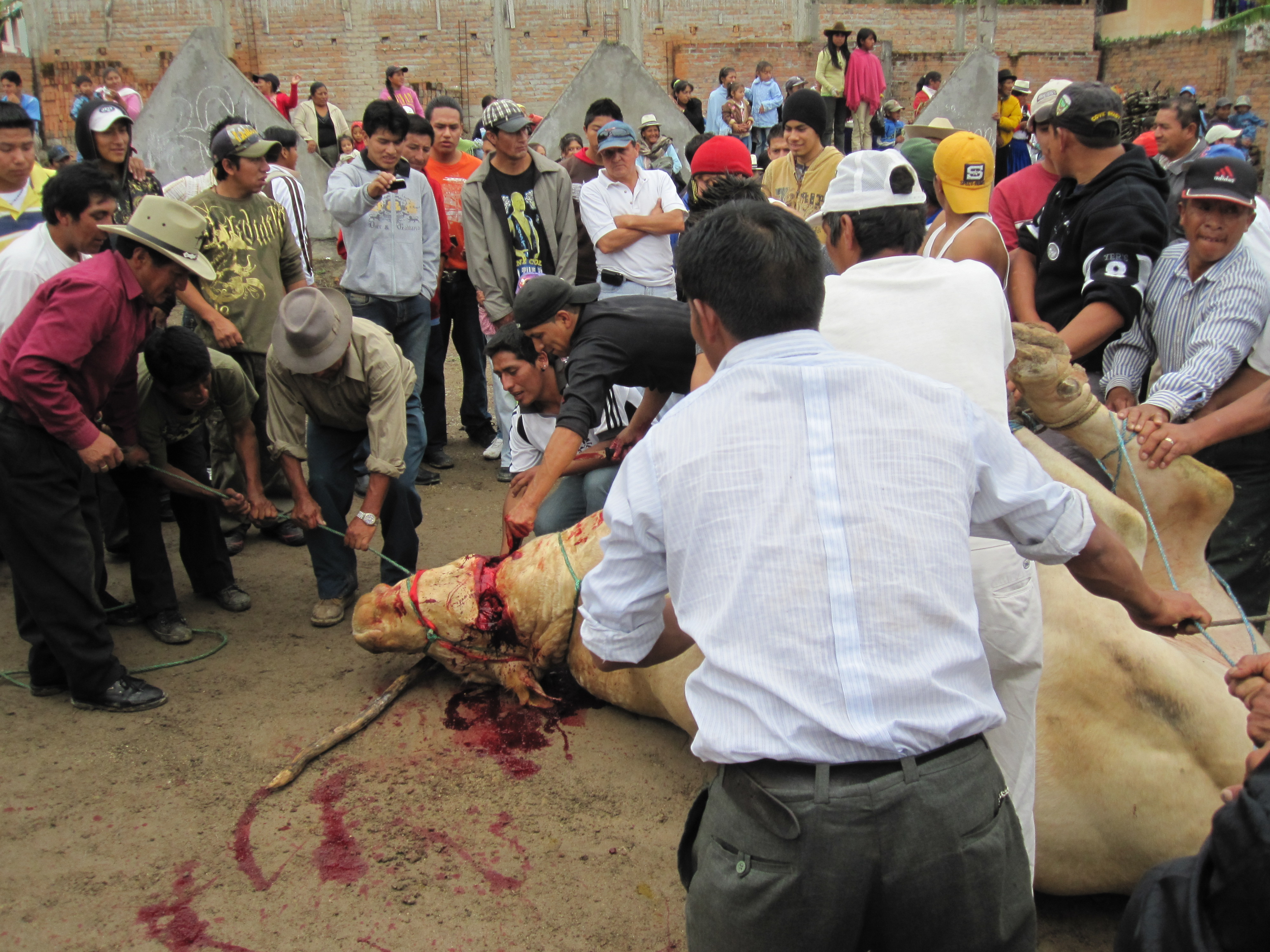
Sacrifice of the bull following a corrida

Fiesta de Toros del Señor de Girón is a festival held each year in Girón, Ecuador. It is the most popular festival in the canton of Girón and is one of the most important festivals in Azuay Province.

The festival celebrates the Señor de las Aguas de Girón, an image of the crucified Christ that is located in Girón's church. The image is believed to bring rain; it is celebrated to bring blessings to agriculture and livestock. The origins of the festival are unclear. Some say that it is adapted from customs practiced by their ancestors, while others claim that it is a Spanish custom that combined with local influences.

The festival takes place around November, and the festival's length depends on the number of priostes (hosts), who provide the funds for the festival. In recent years, it has lasted six weeks. The priostes are generally Ecuadorian emigrants living in the United States and other countries. Each week, there is one primary prioste called the "Fiesta Alcalde" and two secondary hosts called the "Encierro Izquierdo" and the "Encierro Derecho".

The highlight of the festival are the corridas (runnings of the bulls) held each Saturday. Bulls are brought into a plaza and released, so that they can be chased and brought back to the plaza. Young people re-capture the animals, often by pulling on their tails, and bring the animals back to the plaza. Upon the bulls' return, one or more of the bulls is killed as a sacrifice. Dozens of participants surround the bull and take turns drinking the blood that flows from it as it dies. It is commonly believed that the blood is good for the health. After the drinking of the blood, the bull is cleaned and prepared for being served in later festivities.

To accompany the corridas, there are bands and dancing, as well as platilleras (girls chosen from the surrounding area, dressed in traditional clothing). Many of the platilleras are Ecuadorians who have returned from the United States to participate in the festivities. There are exchanges of bottles of liquor with the hosts and agua de canela (cinnamon water) as a sign of friendship and good luck.
