= Chasing Red =

2015 documentary film by Dennis Clancey

- Directed by: Dennis Clancey
- Produced by: Dennis Clancey; Brandon Widener; Iker Zuasti
- Starring: Dennis Clancey; Bill Hillmann; David Ubeda; Josiah Lloyd
- Cinematography: Brandon Widener
- Edited by: Brian Moghari
- Music by: Steve Cahill
- Distributed by: Magnolia Pictures
- Release date: 2015
- Running time: 57 minutes
- Country: United States
- Language: English

Chasing Red is a 2015 American documentary film directed by Dennis Clancey about the running of the bulls at the 2012 Festival of San Fermín in Pamplona, Spain. It follows four runners, among them Clancey and the Chicago writer Bill Hillmann, through the eight bull runs of a single fiesta. The film won the "Best of the Fest" Grand Prize at the LA Indie Film Festival in 2015.

== Production ==
=== Development ===
Clancey, a West Point graduate and Iraq War veteran, began running with the bulls in Pamplona in 2007 and returned every year after. He paid for the project himself from 2007 to 2011. In 2011, co-producer Brandon Widener cut a concept trailer that launched a Kickstarter campaign, which raised $22,966 from 198 backers to film the 2012 fiesta. Post-production was funded in part through an Indiegogo campaign.

=== Filming ===
The film was shot during the 2012 Festival of San Fermín. The crew used several methods to film the runs from different angles, including cable cameras over the route. According to Clancey, the production used 19 types of camera, and Pamplona's head of public safety approved the use of a cable camera system above the street.

== Synopsis ==
The film follows four runners as they attempt to run in all eight bull runs of the 2012 fiesta, combining footage of the runs with interviews with the runners' friends and families.

- Dennis Clancey, the director, who had run every year since 2007
- Bill Hillmann, a former boxer and sports writer from Chicago
- David Ubeda, a Spanish runner from Hellín
- Josiah Lloyd, who was running for the first time

== Release ==
Chasing Red won the "Best of the Fest" Grand Prize at the LA Indie Film Festival in 2015. It was then screened in cities including Phoenix and Chicago, where Clancey and Hillmann took part in a question-and-answer session after a screening on April 15, 2015.

The film is distributed by Magnolia Pictures and is available on streaming platforms including Apple TV. It was released on Vimeo On Demand in January 2020.

== Reception ==
Bobby LePire of Film Threat gave the film a score of 8.5 out of 10, calling its cinematography "jaw-dropping, as it feels like the viewer is in Spain with the director and his friends" and the film as a whole "a thorough and thoughtful examination of what drives people". He praised its pace and its interviews with the runners' friends and families, while noting that the history of the festival "could come a little earlier".

IndieWrap Magazine praised its editing and pacing and called it "exciting, exhilarating and deeper than we thought it would be", adding that "Dennis Clancey has made a magnificent film".

== Later events ==
Hillmann was gored during the 2014 Festival of San Fermín, before the film's release, and spent 11 days in hospital. Clancey and Hillmann both appeared in "Seeing Red: Running With The Bulls", an episode of the CNN series The Whole Story with Anderson Cooper first broadcast on November 26, 2023.

== See also ==
- Running of the bulls
- Festival of San Fermín
- Pamplona
