= Running of the Nudes =

Racing in the nude across the streets of Pamplona, Spain

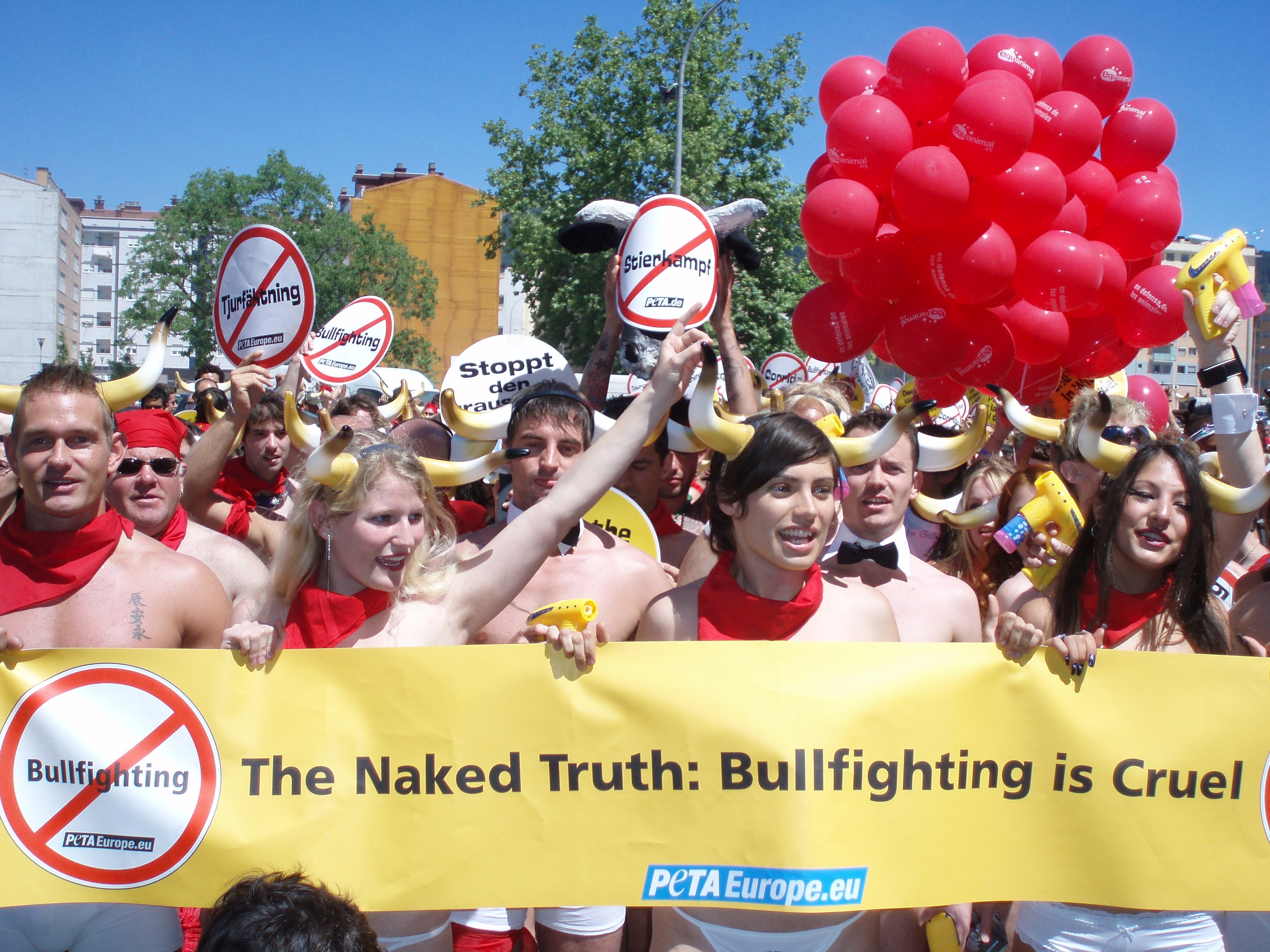
The annual Running of the Nudes in Pamplona - 2007.

The Running of the Nudes, like the well-known Running of the Bulls, takes place in Pamplona, Spain. The Running of the Nudes occurs two days before the Running of the Bulls, just before the start of the nine-day festival of San Fermín. The event was created in 2002 and is supported by animal welfare groups, including PETA, who object to the Running of the Bulls, claiming that the event is cruel and glorifies bullfighting, which the groups oppose. In the Running of the Nudes, naked humans, many wearing only plastic horns and red scarves, follow the same route taken by the Running of the Bulls from the Santo Domingo corrals through the town’s streets and ending at the Plaza de Toros. The length of the run is some 800 metres (about half a mile) and the event takes about one hour.

== History ==
In 2002, approximately 25 naked streakers ran through Pamplona's winding streets to promote an alternative to the Running of the Bulls. Subsequent events saw a steady increase in the numbers of runners with an estimated 1000 nude or semi-nude runners taking part in the event in 2006.

Animal welfare groups across Europe and in North America have promoted the event, coordinating low-cost transportation and accommodations for the runners. The event has become an annual alternative festival to the Running of the Bulls. Local citizens, initially offended by the public display of nudity, have become more accepting due to changing morals and because the new event has extended the traditional festival and added to its important economic impact for the town. Organizers work with local government to obtain permits and provide insurance, as required by local law.

The event was called off in 2020-21. It resumed where it left off in 2022.
