= Toro embolado =

Festive activity in Spain

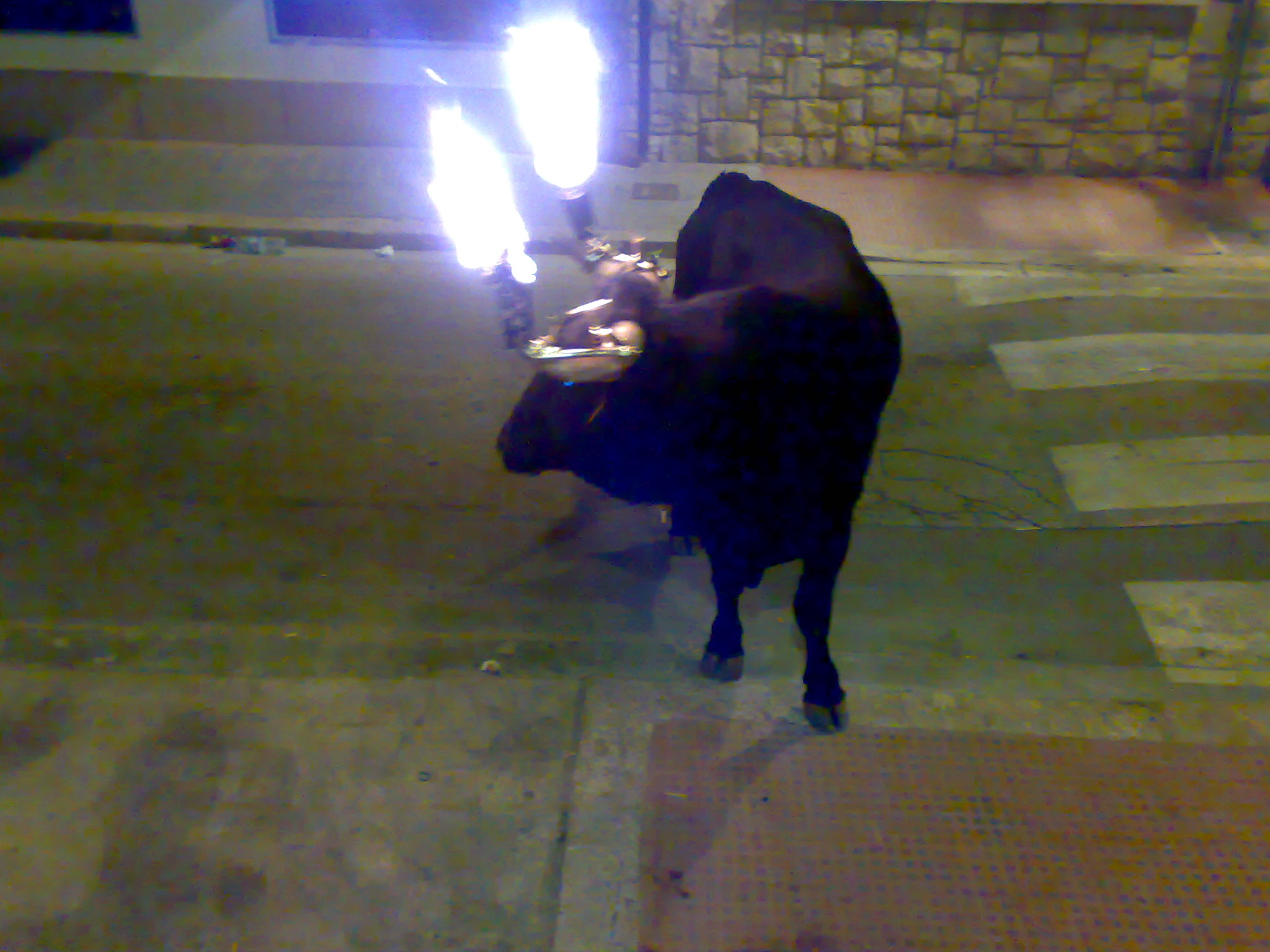
Toro embolado, Godella, 2010

A toro embolado (in Spanish), bou embolat (in Catalan), roughly meaning 'bull with balls', is a festive activity, typical of many towns in Spain (mainly in the Valencian community and Southern Catalonia), in which a bull that has burning balls of flammable material attached to its horns is set free in the streets at night, and participants dodge the bull when it comes close. It can be considered a variant of an encierro (correbous in Catalan). This activity is held in a number of Spanish towns during their local festivals. In the 21st century animal welfare activists have attempted to stop this practice as cruel.

== Background ==
The animal is usually tied to a post and then teams of people prevent it from moving while a wooden frame with two spikes with balls of flammable material is attached to its horns. These are then set alight and the rope is cut. Sometimes fireworks are attached too, which then go off shortly afterwards. There is usually a barricade separating the bull from the spectators.

A somewhat similar activity is the toro de fuego, in which the live bull is replaced by a bull-shaped metal frame (held by a runner) which is set alight.

Vejer de la Frontera has held the yearly El Toro Embolao on Easter Sunday since 1976, where two bulls are let loose in the city. In 2019 a 74-year-old man was gored to death.

== See also ==
- Running of the bulls
