= Toro de fuego =

Festive activity in which a metal frame with fireworks is carried among the public

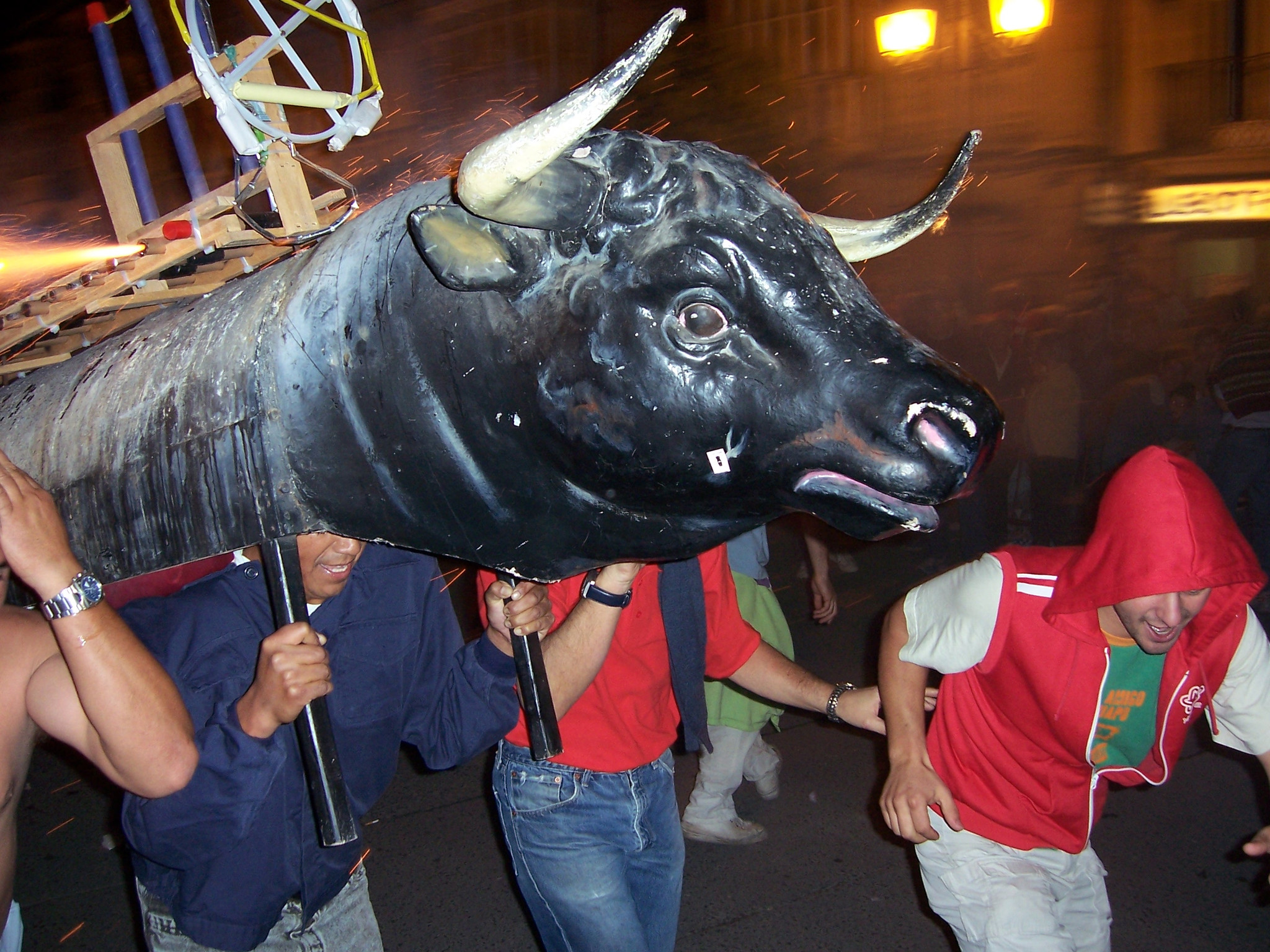
The "bull" in Haro (La Rioja, Spain) is a frame carried by a strong man with a series of fireworks.

A toro de fuego (lit. 'fire bull' or 'bull of fire'; Basque: zezensuzko) is a festive activity in Spain wherein a metal frame resembling a bull, with fireworks attached to it, is set alight, and then carried around town at night as though chasing people in the streets. Participants dodge the bull when it comes close, especially because the burning fireworks set off sparks that can cause small burns in people's skin or clothes. This activity is held in a number of Spanish towns during their local festivals. This custom may have originated to replace the Toro embolado, in which a real bull is involved.

A similar custom in Ecuador and other Latin American countries is known as "crazy cow" (Spanish: vaca loca).

== Background ==
The fire bull is a festival that consists of running a cart or structure made with a frame, that imitates the shape of a bull. The bull is built with a metal or wooden frame so that it can be transported by one or two people. Fireworks are attached to the frame. According to local tradition, the bull can also be in the form of a cart, to which the pyrotechnics are added. The festivals take place during both the day or night.

The bull is widely used during local festivals in numerous towns in Spain and Some of these festivals have their origins in the 19th century. Fire bulls of are also part of the La Semana Grande festival of San Sebastián. Once the fireworks are lit, the fiery bull chases anyone gathered in the streets or squares, scaring them with different types of pyrotechnics In some years, San Sebastian may have as many as thirty bulls, each throwing 1.5 meters (4 ft 11 in) of sparks.

The fire bull is celebrated in numerous Spanish towns, such as Barrax, Bilbao, Candeleda (Ávila), Ciempozuelos (Madrid), Colombres (Asturias), Guadalajara, Haro (La Rioja), Madridejos (Toledo), Tocina (Seville), Valmojado (Toledo), Toro de fuego (Ayerbe) (Huesca) or Fuente de Pedro Naharro (Cuenca). Depending on the location, carts or frames carried by one or more people, with pyrotechnics, are used.

There is an average of one toro de fuego at each local festival. According to data from the Ministry of the Interior for 2003 concerning festejos, there would be 391 for the community of Andalusia, 1143 for the community of Aragon, 1552 for the community of Castilla–La Mancha, 1986 for the community of Castile and León, 54 for the community of Catalonia, 613 for the community of Extremadura. In total for all of Spain: 11,287.

This custom may have originated to replace the Toro embolado, in which a real bull is involved. In many communities in Spain, without the fire bull people feel that there would be no celebration.

== Outside of Spain ==
This practice is also celebrated in the south of France, notably in Saint-Savin (Hautes-Pyrénées), Saint-Jean-de-Luz (Pyrénées-Atlantiques) and Luz-Saint-Sauveur (Hautes-Pyrénées), as well as in Crusnes (Meurthe-et-Moselle).

Similar fiestas are celebrated in other countries such as Colombia, Ecuador, El Salvador, Paraguay or Peru among others, associated with the celebration of local fiestas in some countries, such as the patronal fiestas of Peru or Saint John's Eve in Paraguay, where it is typical. Known as vaca loca, toro candil or torito pinto.

Unlike the bull of fire made in Spain, in some countries of America the bull of fire is decorated with papers and silks of various colors in addition to carrying on the sides or in other areas artificial fires, voladores or reeds with gunpowder that are lit salen disparados.

Many indigenous cultures adopted the bull festival, especially at Christmas as it reflected parts of their pre-Christian beliefs. In Mexico, the bulls are used to celebrate the Christmas holidays in the same tradition of Mojigangas.

== Elements of a bull ==
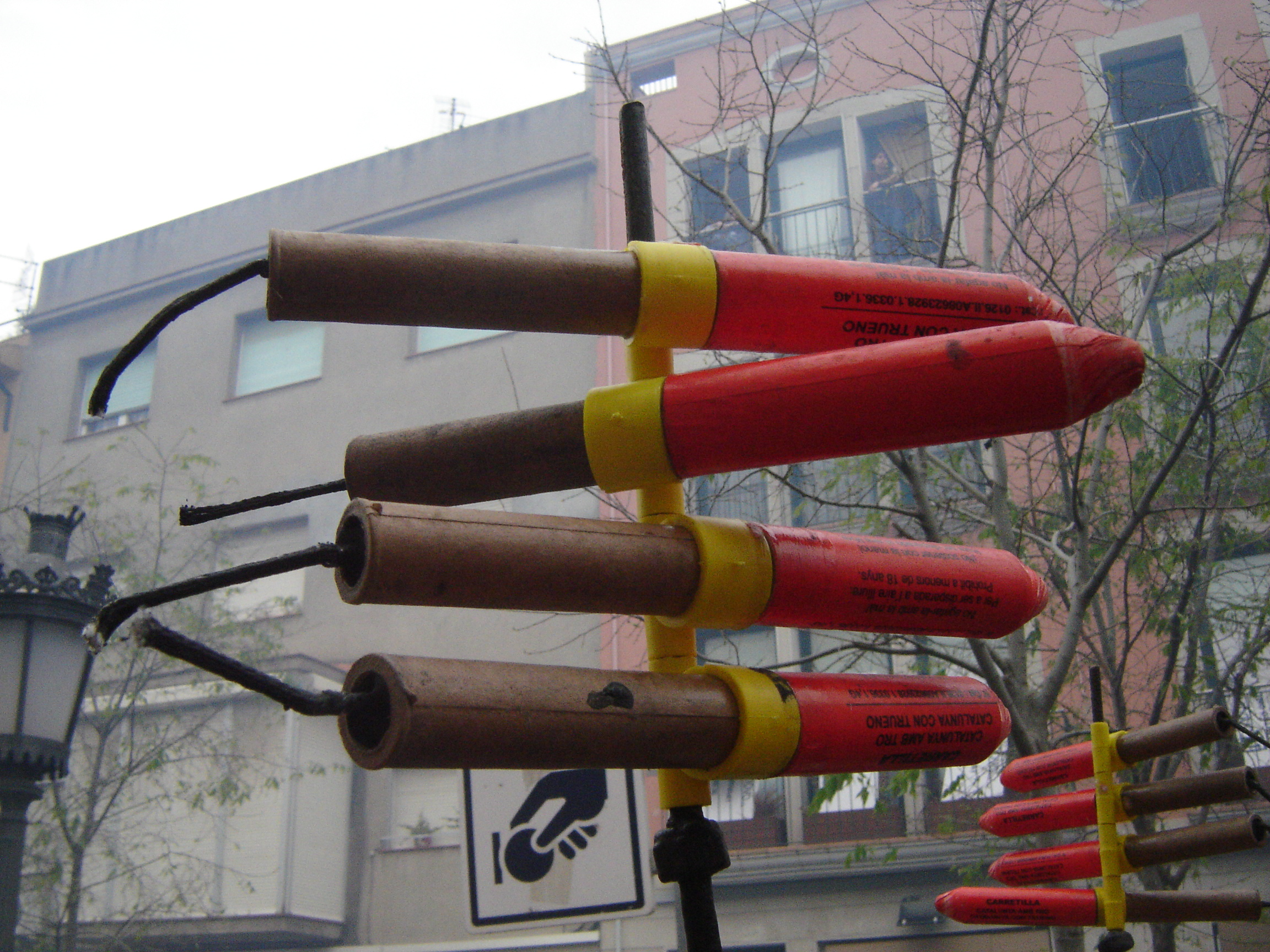
Wheelbarrow rockets

Each frame usually has:

- Nozzles: a piece that consists of a tube loaded with a composition of pressed powder and produces the a jet of fire.
- Wheelbarrow rockets (borrachos, encorreviejas or buscapiés): fireworks that run along the ground throwing sparks, but without exploding. They can cause burns in contact with clothes and skin
- Pinwheel: a piece in the shape of a wheel, in which there are several cartridges that release colored sparks when the wheel is pushed in one direction making circles.
- Cannons: cartridges that launch small colored rockets

== Gallery ==
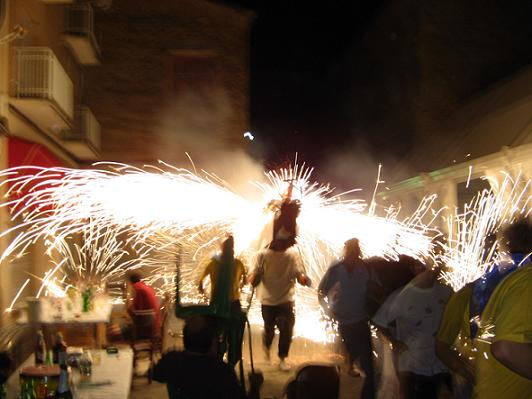
People racing with the bull in Ayerbe

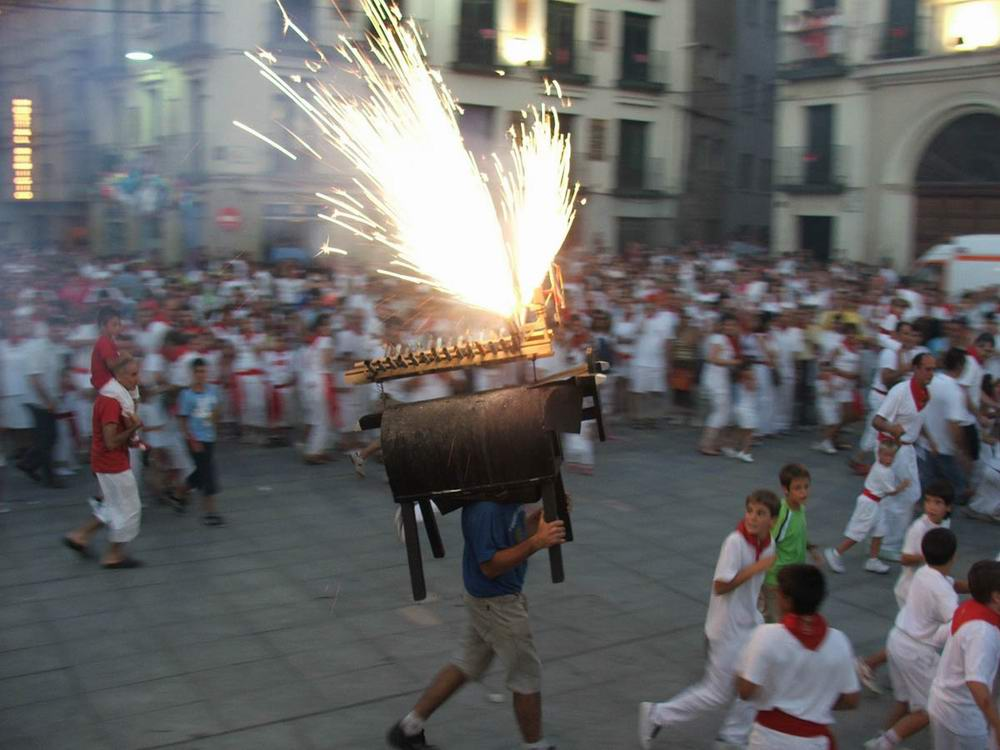
Fiestas de Santa Ana in Tudela

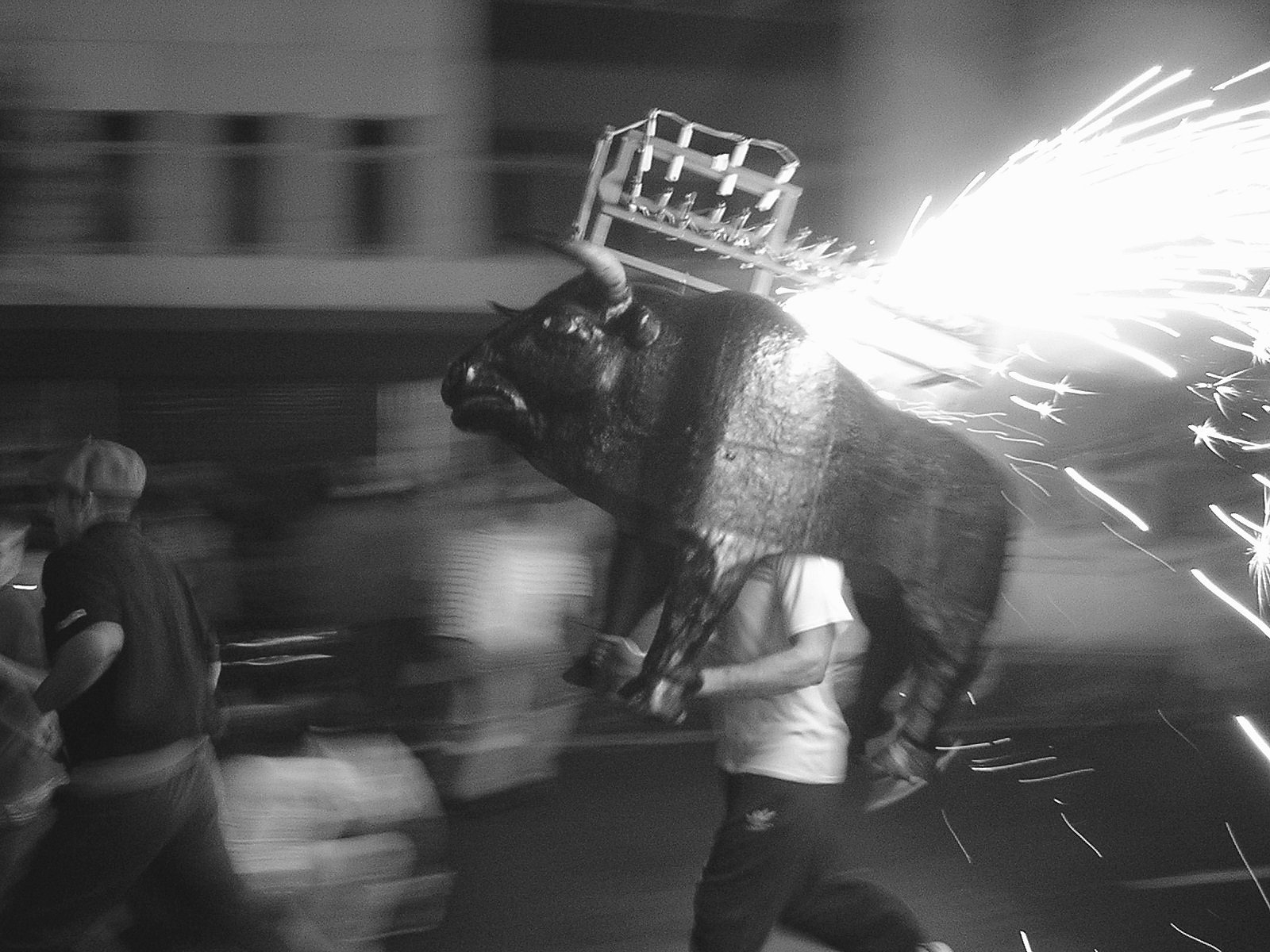
San Sebastián

== Bibliography ==
- Maudet, Jean-Baptiste (2010). Terres de taureaux [Lands of bulls: bullfighting games from Europe to America]. les jeux taurins de l'Europe à l'Amérique (in French). Madrid: Casa de Velasquez. p. 512. ISBN 978-84-96820-37-1.
