= Sokamuturra =

Basque taurine entertainment

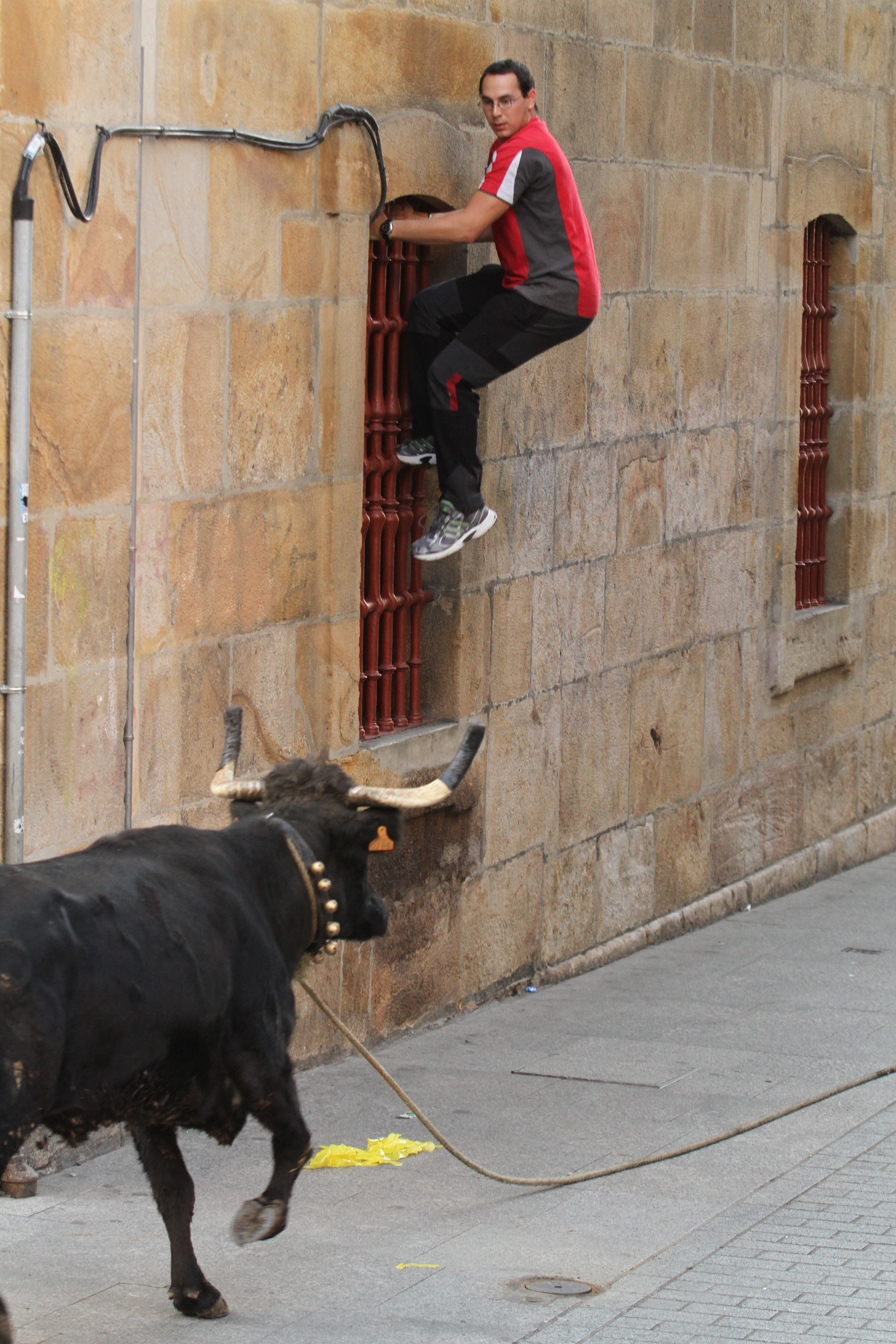
Sokamuturra in Oñati

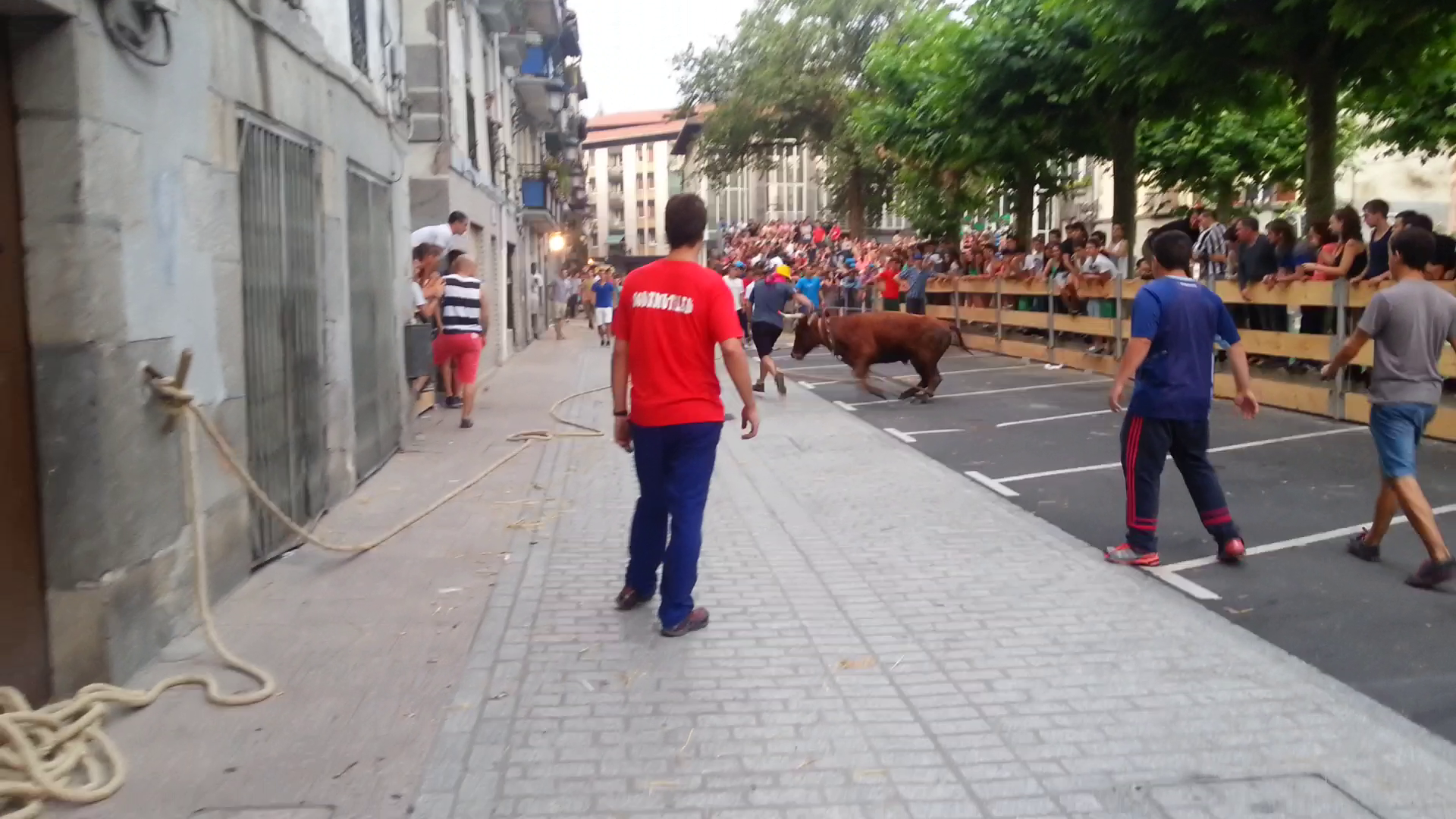
Sokamuturra in Azpeitia

Sokamuturra (from Basque soka, meaning rope and mutur, meaning snout, also known in Spanish as toro ensogado and in English as bull herding), is a form of Basque taurine entertainment where a bull is placed in the street tied to a long rope to limit how far along it can go. People then touch the bull and run around it, typically in order to provoke it into chasing them. The bull often has its horn tips covered. The rope is typically 60-70m long.
