= Bill Hillmann =

Author and journalist

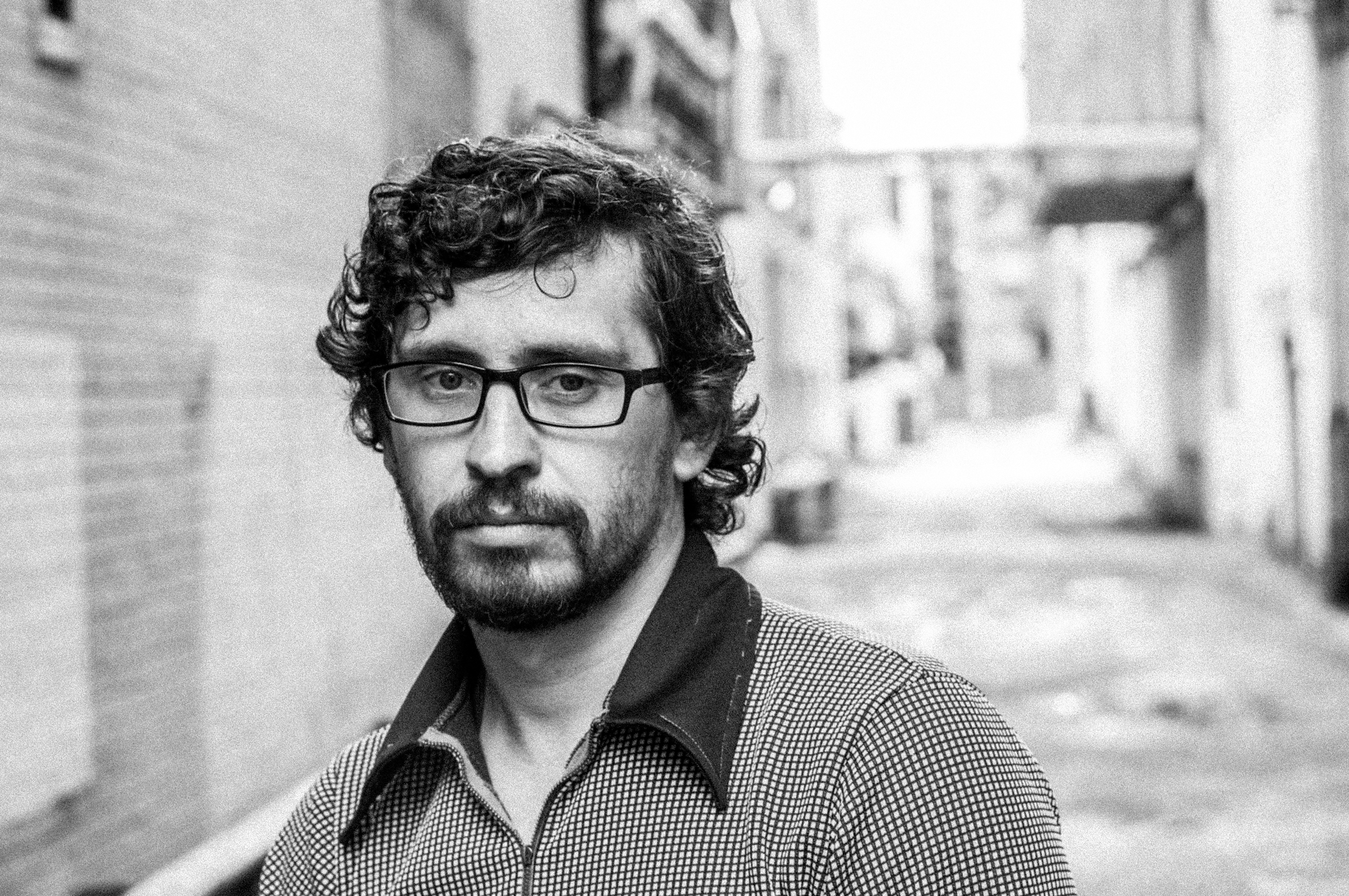
- Hillmann in 2013
- Born: 1982 (age 43–44); Chicago, Illinois, U.S.
- Education: St. Joseph High School; Elmhurst College; Columbia College Chicago (MFA)
- Occupations: Author; storyteller; journalist

Bill Hillmann (born 1982) is an American author, storyteller, and journalist. He is a bull-runner and former boxer.

== Early life and education ==
Hillmann was born in Chicago in 1982, and grew up on the city's North Side. He attended St. Joseph High School. He has a bachelor's degree from Elmhurst College and an MFA from Columbia College Chicago.

== Writing and storytelling ==
As an author, Hillmann is the author of the novel:The Old Neighborhood (2014), and the nonfiction book Mozos: A Decade Running with the Bulls (2015) which was translated and published in Spain as Corriendo con Hemingway (2016).

As a journalist, Hillmann has written for NPR as well as for publications including the Toronto Star, Playboy, Chicago Tribune, Salon, Daily Mail, Los Angeles Times, Stuff, and The Washington Post.

As a storyteller, Hillmann is the creator of the Windy City Story Slam. He also created the National Story Slam, in which ten storytellers representing different storytelling series across the country performed at the main stage of the Chicago Tribune Printer's Row Lit Fest. He has told stories at storytelling series in Philadelphia, Portland, San Francisco, and Boston, and won the Boulder Story Slam in Boulder, Colorado in 2014. He has produced and performed in Story Slam events in London and at the Edinburgh Fringe Festival, has participated in Book Slam, London's literary nightclub, and has told stories on NPR's The Story and Snap Judgment.

== Boxing ==
Hillmann is a 2002 Chicago Golden Gloves boxing champion representing the Windy City Gym and a two time selection for the Chicago Golden Gloves International Traveling Team. As a boxing journalist, Hillmann was the Chicago correspondent for Fightnews, and is the special boxing contributor for the Chicago Tribune RedEye.

== Bull-running ==
Hillmann is an experienced participant in running of the bulls, and has been described as "the best young bull runner from the United States". He has given expert commentary on the running of the bulls for CNN, The Today Show, CBS This Morning, BBC World Service, and Esquire Network. His audio essay "Running with the Bulls in Pamplona" for WBEZ Chicago Public Radio won an Edward R. Murrow Award from the Radio Television Digital News Association in 2010.

He was inspired to join the tradition by Ernest Hemingway's book The Sun Also Rises, and has taken part in the bull runs in Pamplona since 2005. In 2011 and 2012 he wrote how-to guides on the running of the bulls for Outside magazine. By 2013 he had acquired the nickname "Buffalo Bill Hillmann", and in 2014 he co-authored the book Fiesta: How to Survive the Bulls of Pamplona with Alexander Fiske-Harrison and John Hemingway.

On July 9, 2014, a bull named Bravito (Spanish for Brave one), gored Hillmann twice in the thigh at the festival of San Fermín in Pamplona, but he returned to bull-running in Pamplona in 2015, and published his memoir, Mozos: A Decade Running with the Bulls. In the summer of 2016 he ran with the bulls more than 200 times in towns throughout Spain. He has stated that his favorite running of the bulls is the oldest, in Cuéllar, a small town about two hours north of Madrid, where hundreds of horsemen guide the bulls 3 miles (5 km) to the town and into the run.

On July 8, 2017, he was gored by one of the bulls from José Escolar in Pamplona.

== Bibliography ==
- The Old Neighborhood: A Novel. Chicago, Illinois: Curbside Splendor Publishing. 2014. ISBN 978-1-9404-3000-3.
- Mozos: A Decade Running with the Bulls of Spain. Chicago, Illinois: Curbside Splendor Publishing. 2015. ISBN 978-1-9404-3053-9.
- Corriendo con Hemingway: Un Mozo Americano en los San Fermines (in Spanish). Barcelona: Ediciones Península, Planeta Group. 2016. ISBN 978-8-4994-2521-4; translation of Mozos: A Decade Running with the Bulls of Spain
- Hillmann, Bill (2021). The Pueblos: My Quest to Run 101 Bull Runs in the Small Towns of Spain. Chicago, Illinois: Tortoise Books. ISBN 978-1-9489-5417-4.
