= USS Conecuh =

Two ships of the United States Navy have been named Conecuh, after the Conecuh River in Alabama:

- USS Conecuh (AO-103) was intended to be a U.S. Navy oiler, but its acquisition was cancelled; the ship was completed as SS Mission Los Angeles and was later acquired by the U.S. Navy in 1948 as the Mission Buenaventura-class fleet oiler USS Mission Los Angeles (AO-117).
- USS Conecuh (AO-110) was originally the German fleet replenishment oiler Dithmarschen; it was seized at the end of World War II and used by the U.S. Navy for experiments in operation of a combination oiler-replenishment ship.
