= La Iglesia de Nuestra Señora la Reina de los Ángeles =

Historic Catholic church in Los Angeles, California

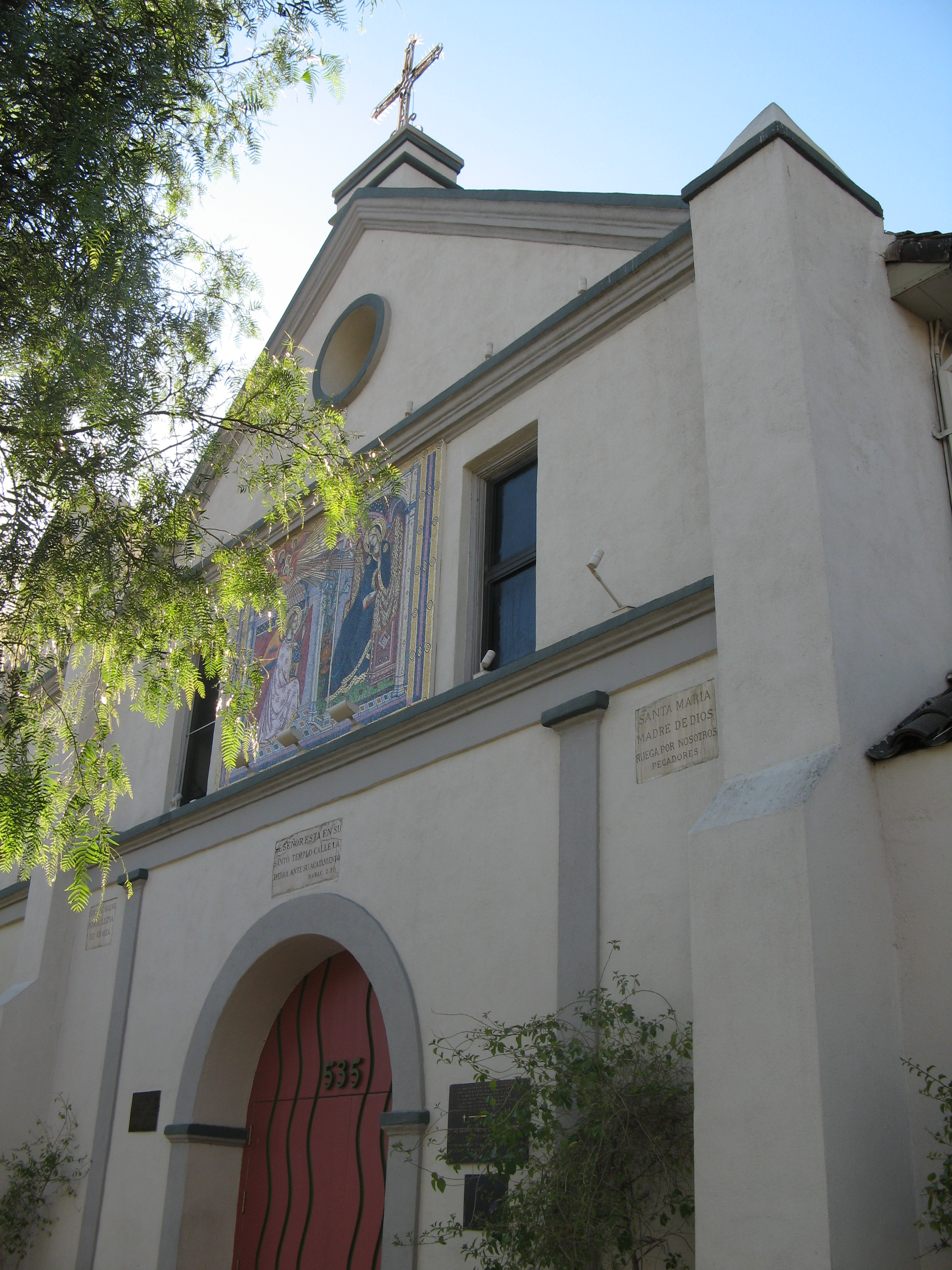

- Location in Central Los Angeles
- Location: Los Angeles, California
- Coordinates: 34.05698°N 118.23939°W
- English translation: The Church of Our Lady Queen of the Angels
- Patron: Mary, mother of Jesus
- Founded: August 18, 1814
- Founded by: Father Luis Gíl y Taboada
- Governing body: Roman Catholic Church
- Current use: Parish Church

California Historical Landmark
- Reference no.: #144

Los Angeles Historic-Cultural Monument
- Reference no.: 3

La Iglesia de Nuestra Señora la Reina de los Ángeles (English: "The Church of Our Lady Queen of the Angels") is a historic Catholic church in Los Angeles, California, located on the historic Plaza de Los Ángeles near Downtown Los Angeles. Part of the larger El Pueblo de los Ángeles Historical Monument, the church's origins date to 1784, when the Spanish founded the Nuestra Señora Reina de los Ángeles Asistencia to support nearby Mission San Gabriel Arcángel. By 1814, the asistencia had been abandoned and a new church was founded in its place by Padre Luis Gil y Taboada. The church is one of the oldest buildings in Los Angeles.

== History ==
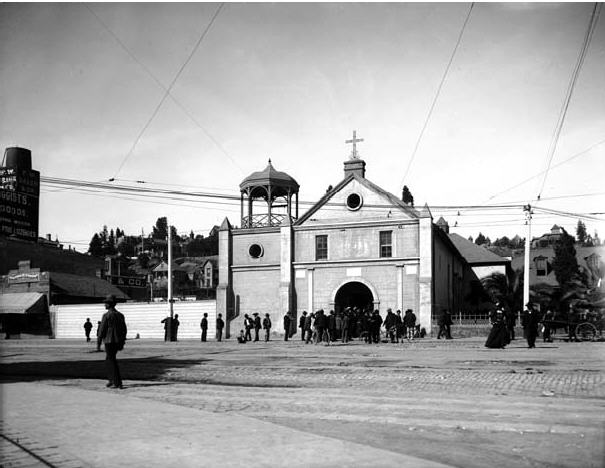
Plaza Church sometime between 1890 and 1900. The structure incorporated a four-bell campanario prior to being rebuilt in 1861.

La Iglesia de Nuestra Señora la Reina de los Ángeles ("The Church of Our Lady Queen of the Angels") was founded on August 18, 1814, by Franciscan Fray Luis Gil y Taboada. He placed the cornerstone for the new church in the adobe ruins of the original "sub-station mission" here, the Nuestra Señora Reina de los Ángeles Asistencia (founded 1784), thirty years after it was established to serve the settlement founding Los Angeles Pobladores (original settlers). The completed new structure was dedicated on December 8, 1822. A replacement chapel, named La Iglesia de Nuestra Señora de los Ángeles – for Mary, mother of Jesus or "The Church of Our Lady of the Angels" – was rebuilt using materials of the original church in 1861. The title Reina, meaning "Queen", was added later to the name. For years, the little chapel, which collected the nicknames "La Placita" and "Plaza Church", served as the sole Roman Catholic church in Los Angeles.

The facility has operated under the auspices of the Claretian Missionary Fathers since 1908.

The church is a part of the Archdiocese of Los Angeles and serves as a neighborhood parish church, as well as a cultural landmark. Since the 1960s it has been retrofitted against earthquakes. Masses are held in Spanish and English.

== Landmark designations ==
The building was designated as one of the first three Los Angeles Historic-Cultural Monuments in 1962. It has also been designated as a California Historical Landmark.

California Historical Landmark Marker NO. 144 at the site reads:

- NO. 144 NUESTRA SEÑORA LA REINA DE LOS ANGELES - La Iglesia de Nuestra Senora la Reina de Los Angeles-the Church of Our Lady the Queen of the Angels-was dedicated on December 8, 1822 during California's Mexican era. Originally known as La Iglesia de Nuestra Senora de Los Angeles, the church was the only Catholic church for the pueblo. Today it primarily serves the Hispanic population of Los Angeles.

== Gallery ==
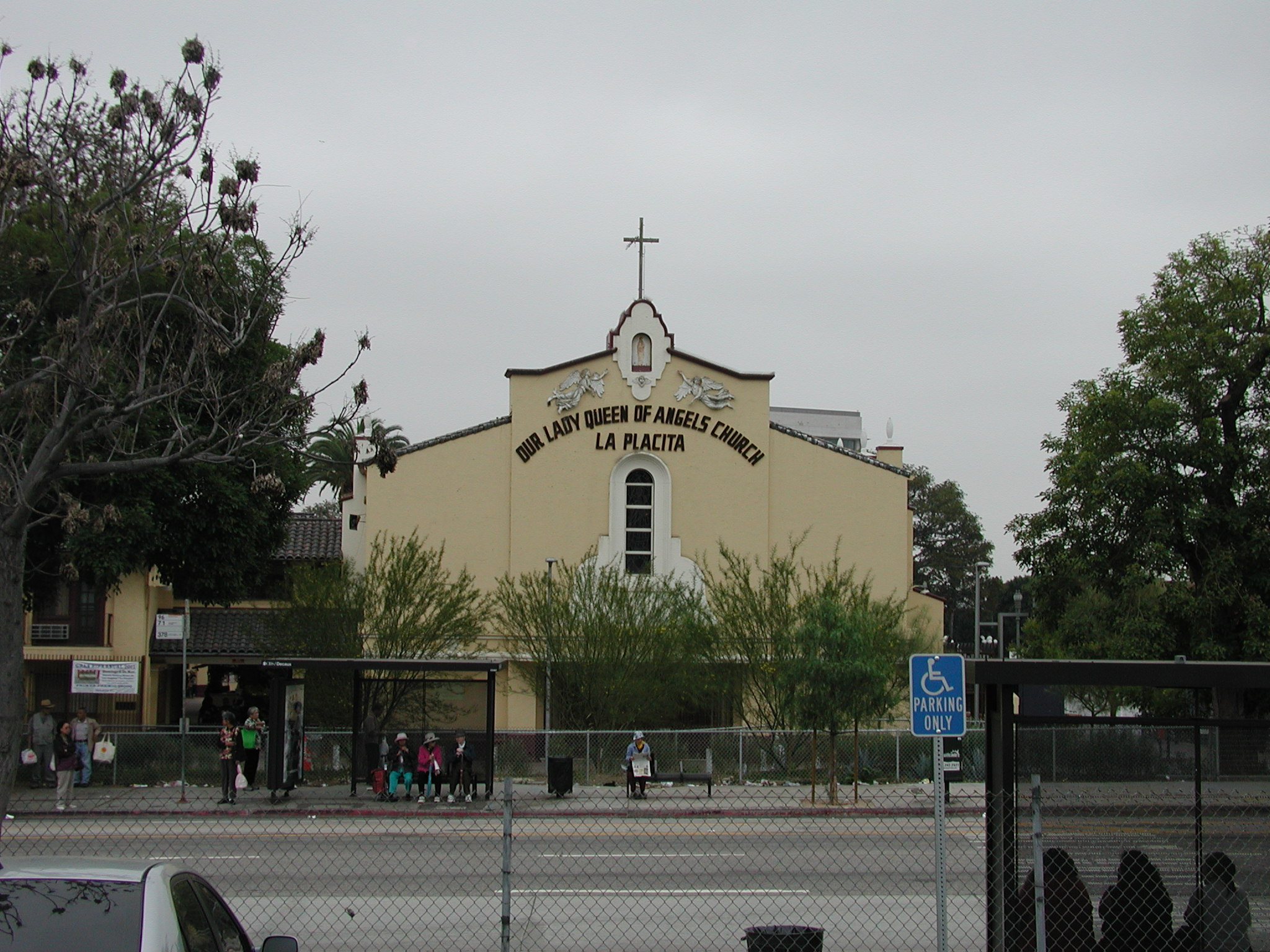
The Spring Street entrance of Nuestra Señora Reina de los Ángeles (Our Lady Queen of Angels/La Placita Church—the main church, not the chapel)

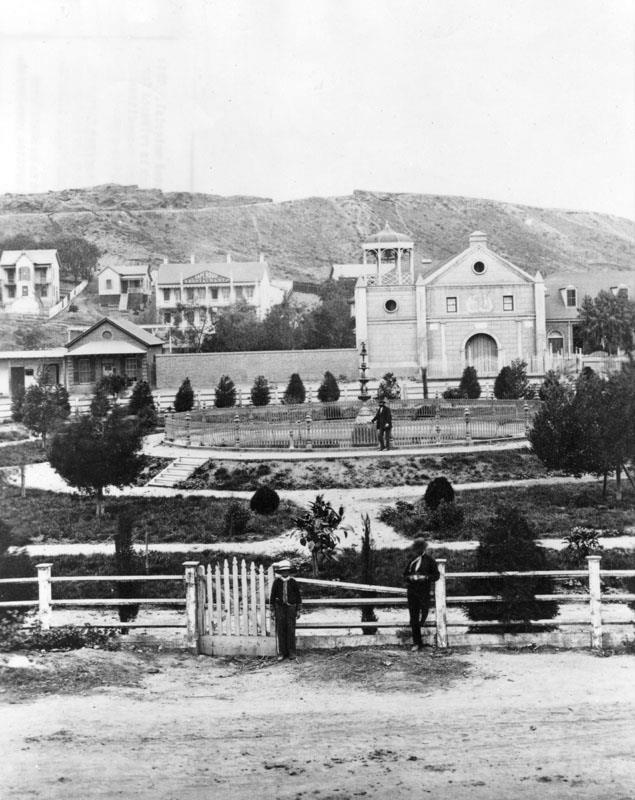
La Placita Church in the Old Plaza in Los Angeles, CA circa 1880

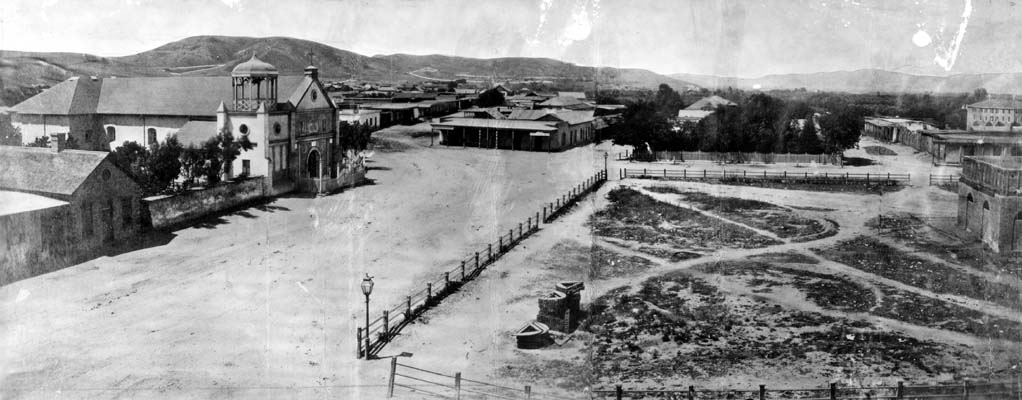
The "Old Plaza Church" facing the Plaza, 1869. The brick reservoir in the middle of the Plaza was the original terminus of the Zanja Madre

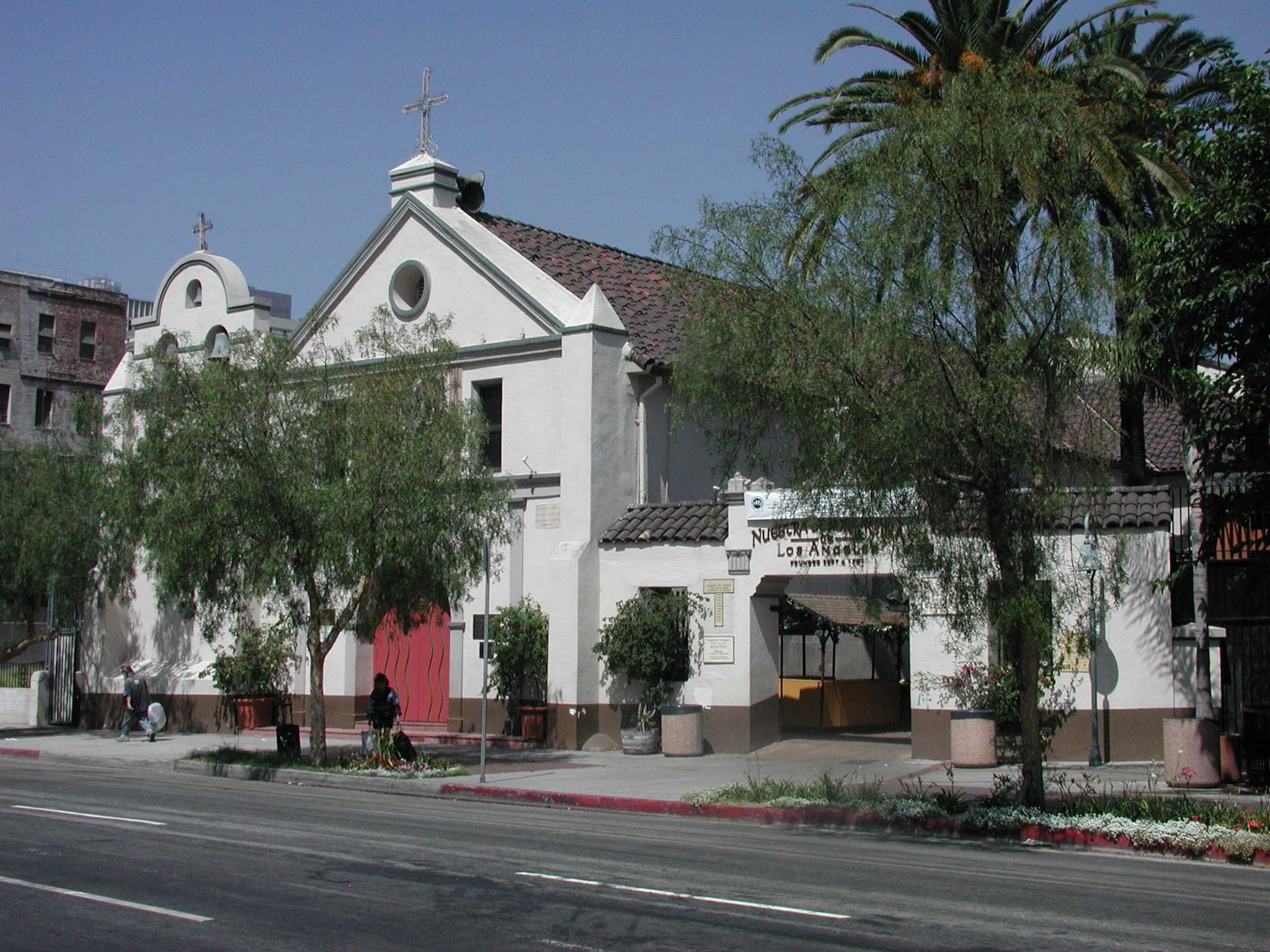
The entrance of Nuestra Señora Reina de los Ángeles (La Placita Church)Chapel located at 535 North Main Street in Downtown Los Angeles on July 20, 2007

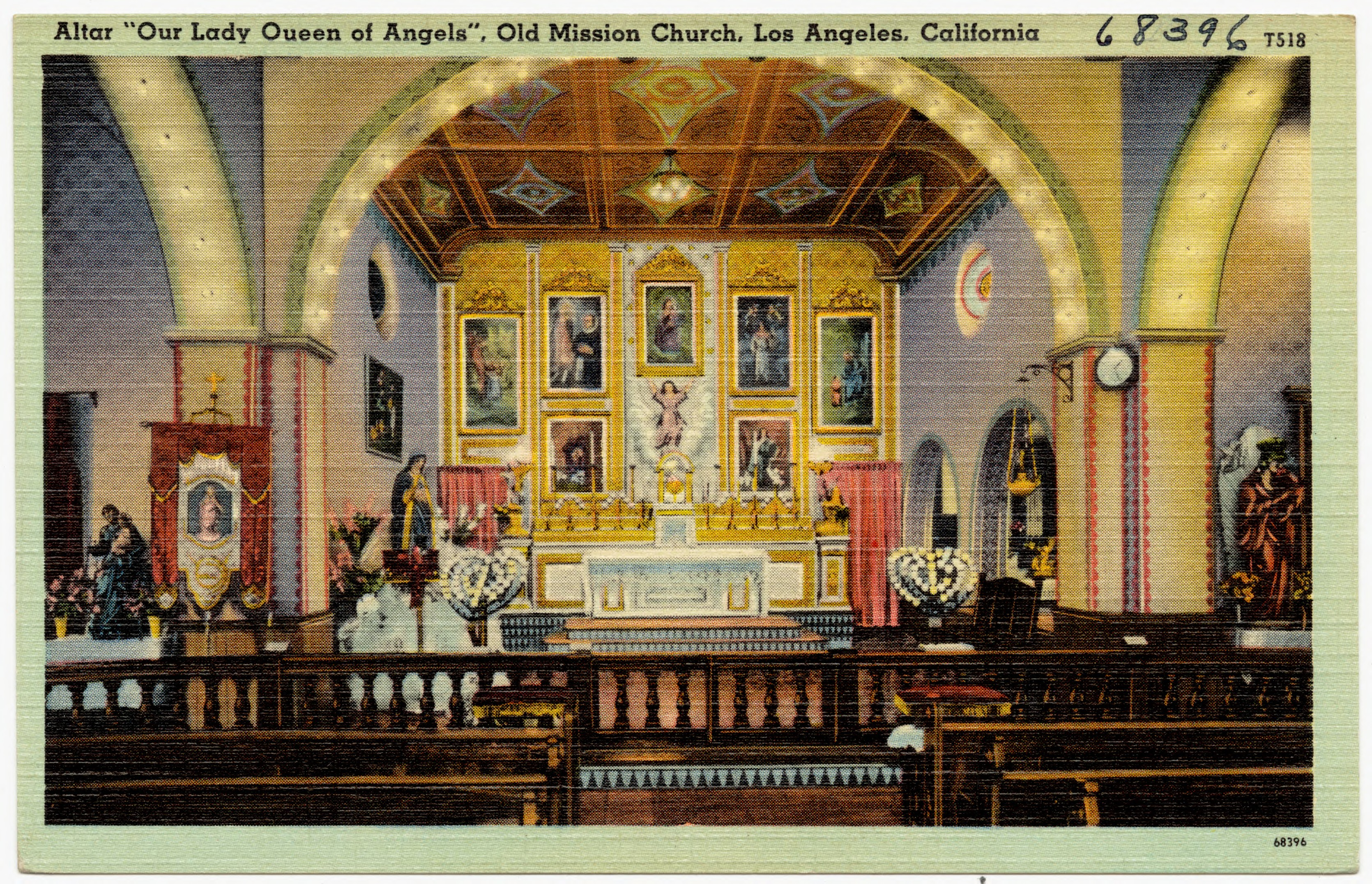
Postcard showing interior circa 1940s

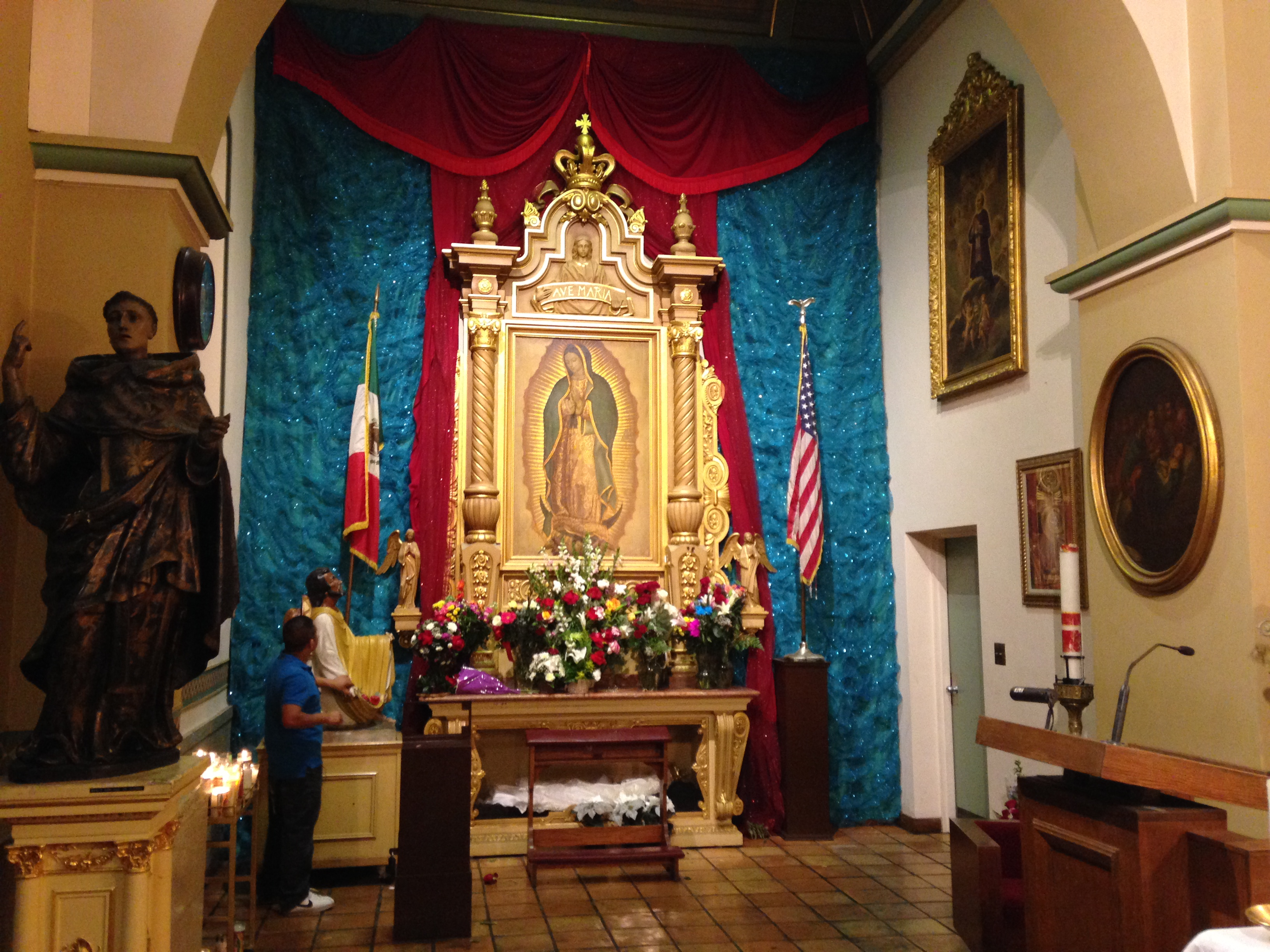
Left side altar. Our Lady of Guadalupe image

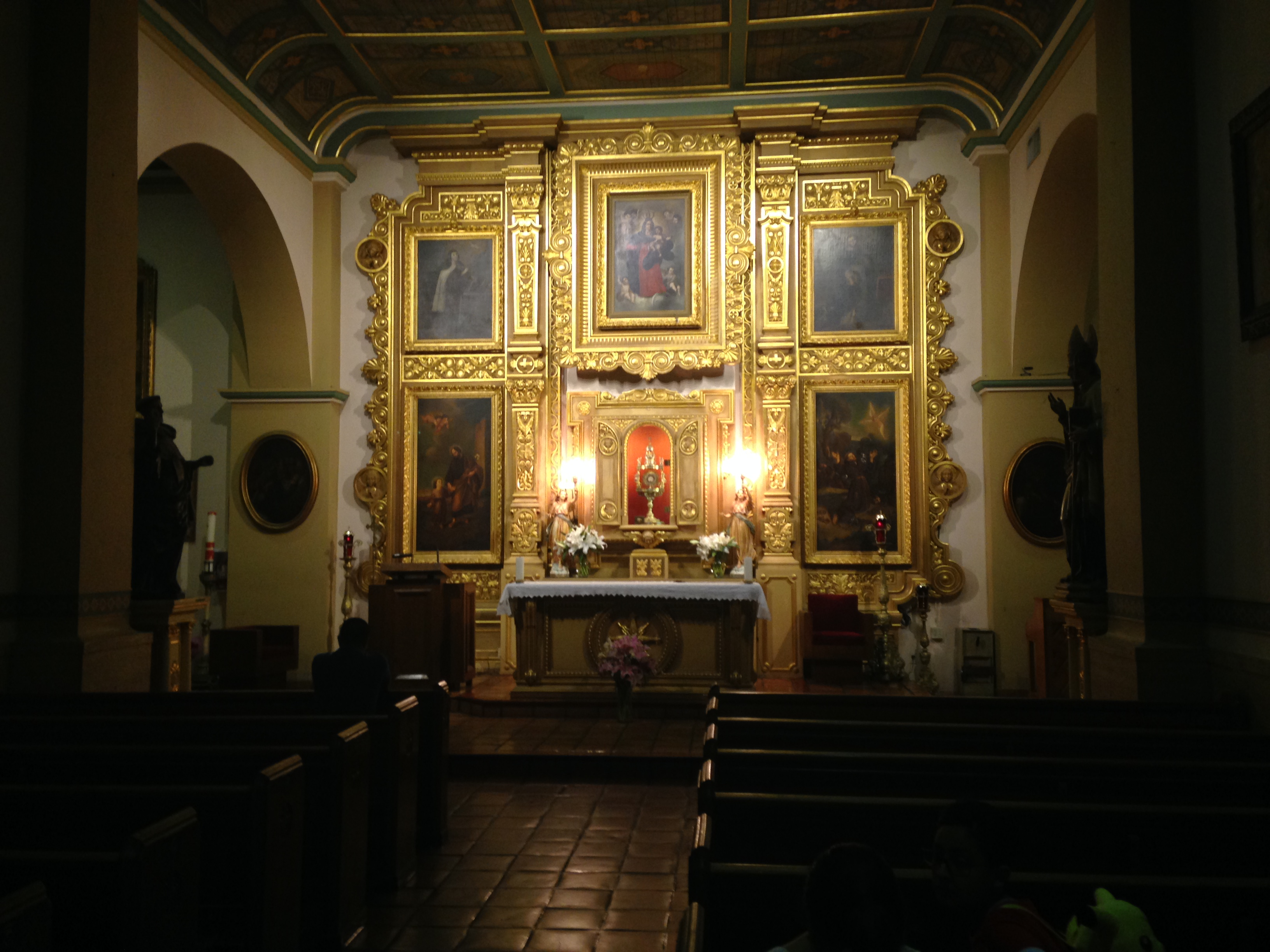
The gilded altar of the church

== See also ==
- List of Spanish missions in California
- Los Angeles Plaza Historic District
- Olvera Street
- List of Los Angeles Historic-Cultural Monuments in Downtown Los Angeles
- History of Los Angeles
- USNS Mission Los Angeles (AO-117) – a Mission Buenaventura class fleet oiler built during World War II.
- Sanctuary movement
- Porziuncola
