= Mission San Luis Obispo de Tolosa =

18th-century Spanish mission in California

Missíon San Luis Obispo De Tolosa
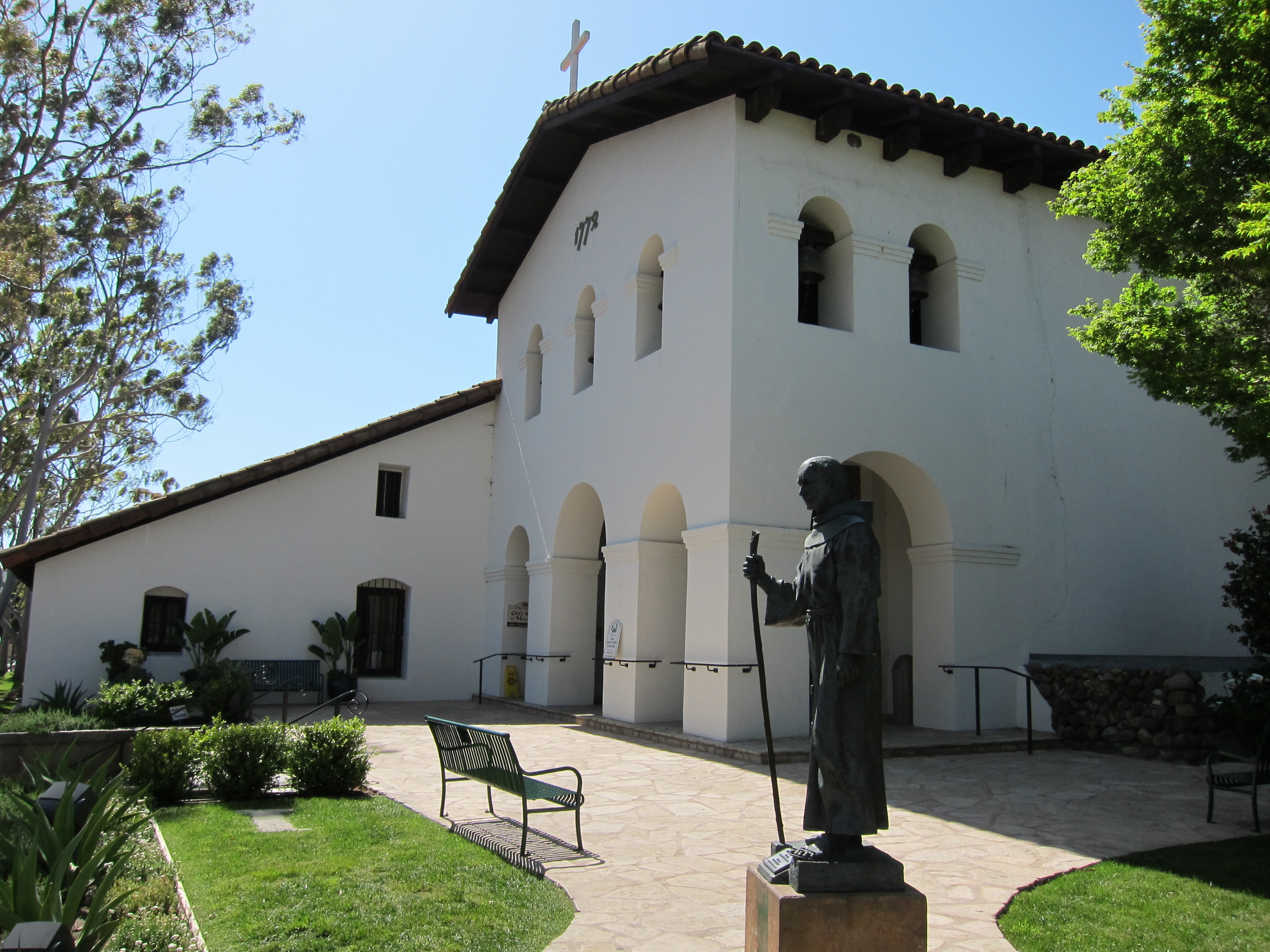
- Missión San Luis Obispo de Tolosa in 2011.

- Location within California
- Location: 728 Monterey St. San Luis Obispo, California 93401
- Coordinates: 35°16′50″N 120°39′52″W
- Name as founded: La Misión de San Luís Obispo de Tolosa
- English translation: The Mission of Saint Louis Bishop of Toulouse
- Patron: Saint Louis of Anjou, Bishop of Toulouse, France
- Nicknames: "Prince of the Missions" "Mission in the Valley of Bears" "The Accidental Mission"
- Founded: September 1, 1772
- Founded by: Father Presidente Junípero Serra
- Founding Order: Franciscan
- Military district: Third
- Native tribe(s) Spanish name(s): Chumash; Obispeño
- Native place name: Tilhini
- Baptisms: 2,644
- Marriages: 763
- Burials: 2,268
- Governing body: Diocese of Monterey
- Current use: Parish Church / Museum

California Historical Landmark
- Reference no.: 325

Website
- http://www.missionsanluisobispo.org

Mission San Luis Obispo de Tolosa (Spanish: Misión San Luis Obispo de Tolosa) is a Spanish mission founded September 1, 1772 by Father Junípero Serra in San Luis Obispo, California. The mission was named after San Luis, obispo de Tolosa (Saint Louis, bishop of Toulouse, France).

The Mission of San Luis Obispo is unusual in its design, in that its combination of belfry and vestibule are found nowhere else among the California missions. Like other churches, the main nave is short and narrow, but at the San Luis Obispo Mission, there is a secondary nave of almost equal size situated to the right of the altar, making it the only L-shaped mission church in California.

== History ==
=== Founding of the mission (1772) ===
In 1769, Gaspar de Portolá traveled through California on his way to the Bay of Monterey and traveled through the San Luis Obispo area. Expedition diarist and Franciscan missionary Juan Crespí wrote that the soldiers called the place "llano de los osos", or the "plain of the bears". Portola followed the same route the following year, on his way to establish the Presidio of Monterey. Missionary president Junípero Serra, traveling by sea, met the Portola party there and founded San Carlos Borremeo, in Monterey, which was moved to Carmel the following year.

When food supplies started to dwindle at the mission, Serra remembered the stories of the "valley of the bears." He decided to send a hunting expedition to San Luis Obispo to help feed the Spanish and neophytes (natives that converted to Christianity) in Monterey. The success of the hunting expedition caused Junípero Serra to consider building a mission in that area. Upon further investigation, he was convinced that San Luis Obispo would be a perfect site for a mission, based on its surplus of natural resources, good weather and the Chumash, a local Native American tribe who could be used as labor, often by means of enslavement. The mission became the fifth in the mission chain founded by Father Junípero Serra. Serra himself was known for intimidating and controlling native subjects, and once baptized, the Chumash were not allowed to leave the missions, nor were the generations to follow.

Father Serra sent an expedition down south to San Luis Obispo to start building the mission, and on September 1, 1772, a cross was erected near San Luis Obispo Creek and Serra celebrated the first mass. Following the first mass, Father Junípero Serra left the responsibility of construction to Father José Cavaller. The mission was to be named after San Luis, obispo de Tolosa, a saint that is popular within the Franciscan order. Father Cavaller used Chumash labor in building the palisades, which would serve as temporary buildings for the mission. Native American tribes set these buildings ablaze in an act of resistance against European colonization. The buildings were rebuilt using adobe and tile structures.

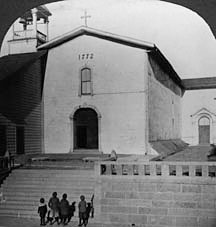
Mission San Luis Obispo de Tolosa as it looked circa 1900. Note the wooden belfry in the upper left corner, and that since 1900 the chapel façade has been substantially modified, which modifications can be seen in the more recent photo further above.

Beginning in 1794 Mission San Luis Obispo went through extensive building operations. Buildings to accommodate the nearby Native Americans and many improvements to the mission, including storerooms, residences for single women, soldiers barracks and mills were added. The renovation was finished after completion of the quadrangle in 1819, and celebrated a year later by the arrival of two mission bells from Lima, Peru. The arrival of the bells marked the end of improvements made to Mission San Luis Obispo de Tolosa for many years. In 1830 Father Luis Gil y Taboada took over the mission, but he died three years later. In 1842, the death of Father Ramon Abella marked the last Franciscan at the mission for the next 40 years.

=== Rancho period (1834–1849) ===
In 1845, Governor Pío Pico sold the San Luis Obispo Mission to Captain John Wilson for $510. John C. Frémont and his "California Battalion" used the mission as a base of operations during their war with Mexico in 1846 (see Bear Flag Revolt). The mission fell to ruins during the period of secularization and the priests who were left would rent out rooms to help support the mission.

=== California statehood (since 1850) ===
The Mission San Luís Obispo de Tolosa became the first courthouse and jail in San Luis Obispo County, California. In 1850, when California became a part of the United States, the first California bishop, Joseph Alemany, petitioned the Government to return some of the mission lands back to the Church. Since then, it has undergone major civic, political and structural changes. In the 1880s, the front portico and bell loft were removed when weakened by an earthquake. An attempt was made to "modernize" the structures, and the colonnades along the front of the convento wing were razed and the Church and residence were covered with wooden clapboard. A New England–style belfry was added. The changes protected the structure from further decay, although significantly altering the facade of the buildings. In the 1930s, during the pastorship of Fr. John Harnett, the buildings underwent extensive restoration to transform them back to early mission style. The 1893 annex was extended in 1948. The mission is the center of the busy downtown area, and functions as a Catholic parish church for the City of San Luis Obispo in the Diocese of Monterey.

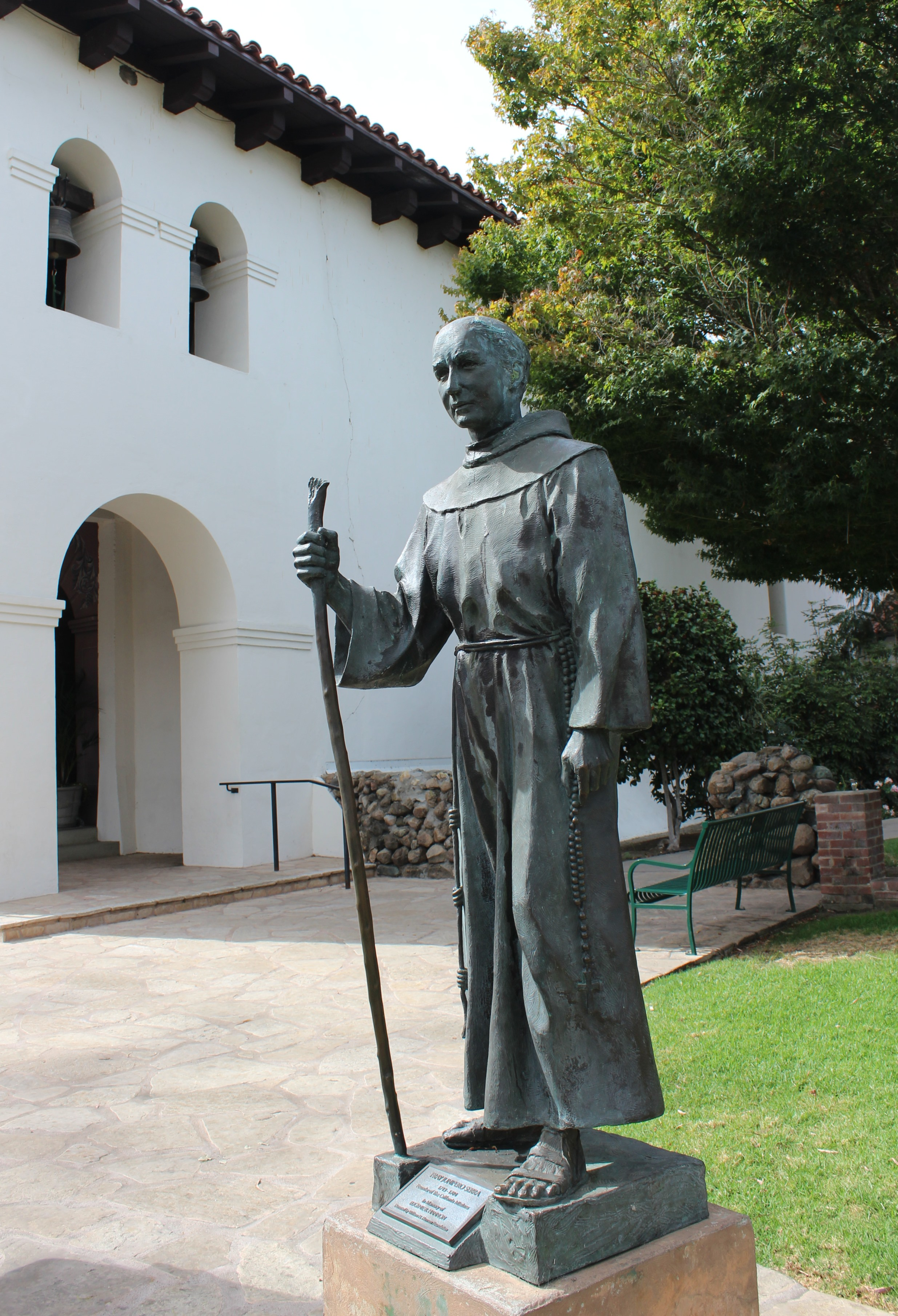
Statue of Junípero Serra in 2015

== Mission plaza ==
In 1970 the Mission was recognized as the center of the City of San Luis Obispo, with the dedication of Mission Plaza. Mayor Ken Schwartz worked with students from Cal Poly to develop a plan to convince voters to close Monterey Street in front of the mission. Construction of a plaza began in 1969 and the plaza was dedicated in 1970. A statue of Junípero Serra was installed on the grounds facing the public Mission Plaza. The attention to the statues of Junípero Serra expanded during the George Floyd protests to include monuments of individuals associated with the controversy over the genocide of indigenous peoples in the Americas. The statue was moved into storage on the grounds in 2020.

The plaza in front of the mission often serves as a location for demonstrations and protests in the San Luis Obispo county.

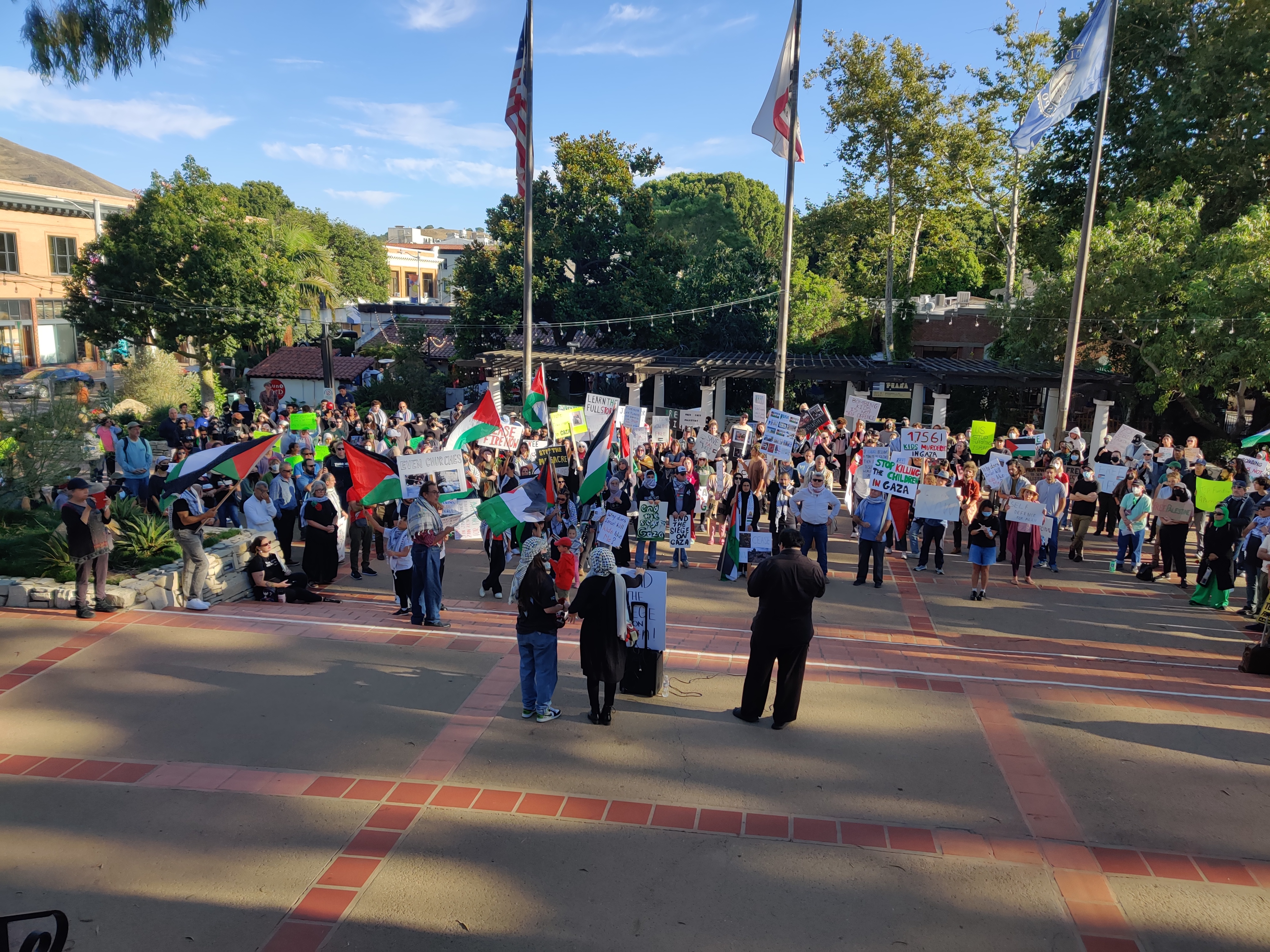
Pro-Palestine rally and march at the San Luis Obispo mission, California, on October 21, 2023

== See also ==
- List of Spanish missions in California
- Mission San Luis Obispo – a Mission Buenaventura Class fleet oiler built during World War II.
- City of San Luis Obispo Historic Resources
