= Mission San Francisco Solano =

19th-century Franciscan mission in California

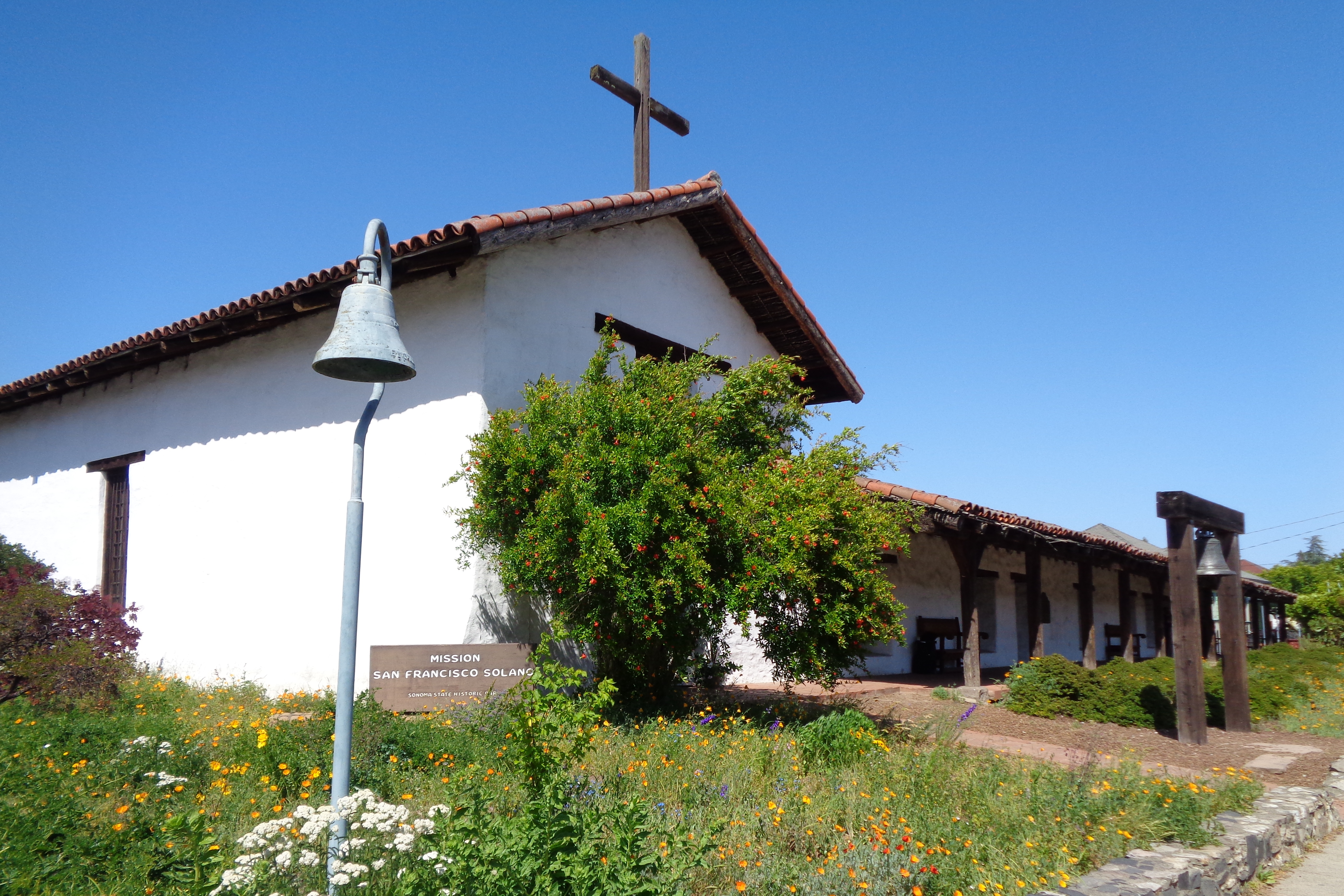

- Location within California Location within the United States
- Location: 114 E Spain St; Sonoma, California
- Coordinates: 38°17′38″N 122°27′21″W
- Founded: July 4, 1823
- Founded by: Father José Altimíra
- Founding Order: 21
- Military district: Fourth
- Native tribe: Coast Miwok, Patwin, Pomo, Suisunes, Wappo
- Native place name: Huchi
- Baptisms: 1,563 total
- Marriages: 359 total
- Burials: 896 total
- Neophyte population: 996 in 1832
- Governing body: California Department of Parks and Recreation
- Current use: Museum

California Historical Landmark
- Reference no.: 1. 3

Website
- http://www.parks.ca.gov/?page_id=479

Mission San Francisco Solano was the 21st, last, and northernmost mission in Alta California. It was named for Saint Francis Solanus. It was the only mission built in Alta California after Mexico gained independence from Spain. The mission was established in 1823 due to a collaborative effort between California governor Luis Argüello and Franciscan friar José Altimira. It was closed and converted to a parish in 1834, having been smaller in number of converts and having had lower productivity and diversity of industries than the older California missions.

The mission building is now part of the Sonoma State Historic Park and is located in the city of Sonoma, California.

== History ==
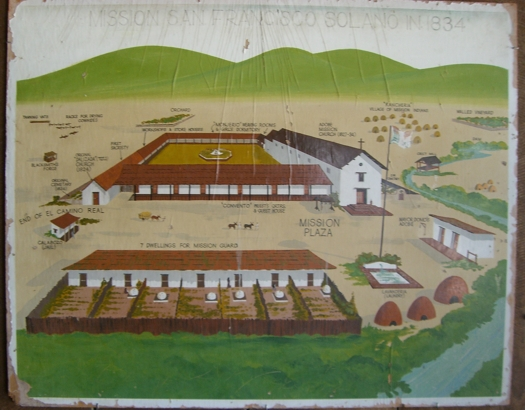
Stylized portrayal of the Mission

=== Fr. Altimira ===
Fr. José Altimira at age 33 arrived from Barcelona, Spain, to serve at Mission San Francisco de Asís. The mission was not thriving because of its climate and had established a medical asistencia ("sub-mission") in San Rafael to help the mission's ill neophytes (baptized Native Americans) recover their health. California Governor Luis Argüello was interested in blocking the Russians at Bodega Bay and Fort Ross from moving further inland. Together they developed and presented to the church authorities and the territory (legislature) a plan for moving Mission San Francisco de Asís and the San Rafael asistencia to a new location north of the Bay. The legislature approved but the church authorities did not respond (they had forwarded the plan to their superiors in Mexico). Under the old Spanish regime, founding a new mission required the approval of both New Spain's Bishop and the King's Viceroy.

Beginning in 1823, while waiting for a response from the church authorities, Fr. Altimira, with military escorts, began exploring north of the Bay for a suitable mission site. On July 4, 1823, the soldiers placed a large redwood cross on the place in the Sonoma Valley where they expected the new Mission San Francisco de Asís to be established. They celebrated Mass to consecrate the location, then returned south to begin gathering men and materials to begin construction.

The area around the selected site was not empty. It was near the northeast corner of the territory of the Coast Miwok, Southern Pomo to the northwest, Wappo to the northeast, Suisunes and Ptwin peoples to the east. A detachment of soldiers from the Presidio of San Francisco would be provided to protect the Mission and guard the neophytes.

Altimira, with soldiers and neophytes primarily from Mission San Francisco de Asís, returned to the Sonoma area near the end of August. Altimira decided there was a better place to build on the other side of the valley. Just after starting he received a letter from Father-President Sarria who refused Altimira permission to continue building. Fr. Altimira obeyed and the month of September saw continuing negotiations between California's civil and religious leaders. On September 30 an agreement was reached: a new mission could be built and Fr. Altimira would be its minister, but Mission San Francisco de Asís would not be closed and the San Rafael asistencia had already been designated as a full mission (Mission San Rafael Arcángel).

Beginning in October 1824 Fr. Altimira had the opportunity to build his new mission at the location he chose, but since Mission San Francisco de Asís would remain open this Mission needed a different patron saint. Altimira chose San Francisco Solano, a 17th-century Franciscan missionary to South America. His company of soldiers and neophytes set about building all the facilities needed in a California mission. His annual report for 1823 listed no baptisms, one marriage, one funeral, a population of 482 Indians (all transferred from other missions) and 1341 animals. The work had started too late in the year for anything to be planted and harvested.

On April 4, 1825, Passion Sunday, Father Altimira proudly dedicated his church. It was a crude, temporary structure but it symbolized development at the Mission. The church was built of whitewashed boards but was well furnished and decorated. Many of the articles were gifts from the Russians at Fort Ross. It also held a canvas painting of San Francisco Solano which had been donated by the Father-President. Furthermore, the Mission had been promised a relic of the patron saint to put in the altar.

The Mission continued to develop until an argument arose about the sharing of the bountiful 1826 harvest. Indians not living at the Mission were unhappy with the amount allocated for their work; they burned some of the wooden buildings in protest. Fr. Altimira with a few faithful neophytes fled to Mission San Rafael Arcángel.

=== Fr. Fortuni ===
Fr. Buenaventura Fortuni, an aging Spanish Franciscan who had been working at Mission San José in California, was assigned to replace Altimira. Fr. Fortuni quickly reestablished order and morale and the work of building the mission restarted. He arranged the main buildings to form a large, square enclosure.

In 1830 Fr. Fortuni, having labored alone at this mission for three and a half years, felt the need to transfer to another mission where the workload could be shared. He was 58 years old. The Mexican government had in 1826 required that all the Spanish friars who would not pledge loyalty to Mexico leave. Fr. Fortuni had been exempt from this rule but all new churchmen would be required to take the pledge.

=== Fr. Gutierrez ===
Fr. Fortuni was replaced by Fr. José Gutiérrez, a Franciscan friar from South America. Fr. Gutierrez continued to build and increased the agricultural effort. By 1832 the mission had 27 rooms in the convento or priest's quarters, with a great adobe church at the east end, and a wooden storehouse (the original mission chapel) at the west end. Completing this enclosure were workshops where the Indians were taught to be craftsmen and created the items needed to help the mission be self-sufficient. Along the back of the courtyard were the living quarters and workrooms for the young Indian girls. In addition to the quadrangle, there were orchards, gardens, vineyards, fields of grain, a gristmill, houses for the soldiers and Indian families, a jail, a cemetery, and an infirmary.

The most successful year of this mission's short life span (11 years) was 1832. In his annual report for that year, Fr. Gutierrez recorded the following: 127 baptisms, 34 marriages, and 70 deaths; a total of 996 neophytes (coming from 35 area villages); the livestock inventory included 6,000 sheep and goats, 900 horses, 13 mules, 50 pigs and 3,500 head of cattle. Crops were measured in fanegas, or Spanish bushels, a variable measure of volume generally between 50 and 60 liters. In 1832 the mission produced 800 fanegas of wheat, 1025 fanegas of barley, 52 fanegas of peas, 300 fanegas of corn, 32 fanegas of beans, and 2 fanegas of garbanzos.

== Secularization ==
In 1833 the Mexican Congress decided to close all of the missions in Alta California with the passage of the Mexican secularization act of 1833. Governor Figueroa issued a regulation (Reglamento Provisional para la secularization de las Misiones) on August 9, 1834, outlining the requirements for the distribution of property (land, cattle, and equipment) to each mission's neophytes. Among the provisions were that "5. To each head of a family and to all over 20 years old, will be given from the Mission lands a lot not over 400 nor less than 100 varas square" (28 to 7 acres). Plus "6. ...pro rata...one-half of the livestock" and "7. ... half or less of the existing chattels, tools, and seed...".

== Closure ==
Mission San Francisco Solano officially ceased to exist on November 3, 1834, when it was designated a First Class Parish. The Spanish missionaries were to be replaced by parish priests, the first of whom was Fr. Lorenzo Quijas who had earlier been assigned to Sonoma and San Rafael.

Lieutenant (teniente) Mariano Vallejo, Commandant of the Presidio of San Francisco, was named administrator (comisionado) to oversee the closing of the Mission under the Reglamento. Fr. Quijas moved back to San Rafael in July 1835, after many disputes with Guadalupe Antonio Ortega, Vallejo's majordomo to whom he had delegated the work of secularization. Ortega (sometimes called Sergeant Ortega) was “uneducated, coarse and licentious". Right after returning to San Rafael, Padre Quijas wrote a letter to Commissary Perfect Garcia Diego, his superior, complaining about the situation in Sonoma and specifically the "abominable deeds of Ortega." Quijas then gives names of witnesses to be called against Ortega. Upon receipt of the letter, Fr. Diego forwarded it to Governor José Figueroa demanding some action against Ortega. The Governor was critically ill and died at the end of the following month. No action was taken. It wasn't until the summer of 1837, because of new scandals and unsatisfactory accounts, that Ortega was removed.

After Fr. Quijas left, the neophyte population decreased rapidly, most returning to their home villages – taking their movable property with them – or moving to ranchos {including Vallejo's Petaluma Adobe} to work, or staying in Sonoma as servants. Some former Mission Indians reportedly received their allotted land and cattle from the Mission (none of these small plots of land were permanently recorded.) In August 1839, the government sent William Edward Petty Hartnell as Visitador General de Misiones to check compliance with the Reglamento but Vallejo avoided responding – claiming he did not have time because of military affairs. No effective review of the secularization of the Sonoma mission was ever completed.

== Decline ==
The mission buildings rapidly fell into disrepair. The town of Sonoma was growing and building materials were in great demand. Roof tiles, timbers, and adobe bricks were salvaged from the mission buildings. After the settlers had ransacked the old buildings, nature began recycling the remnants.

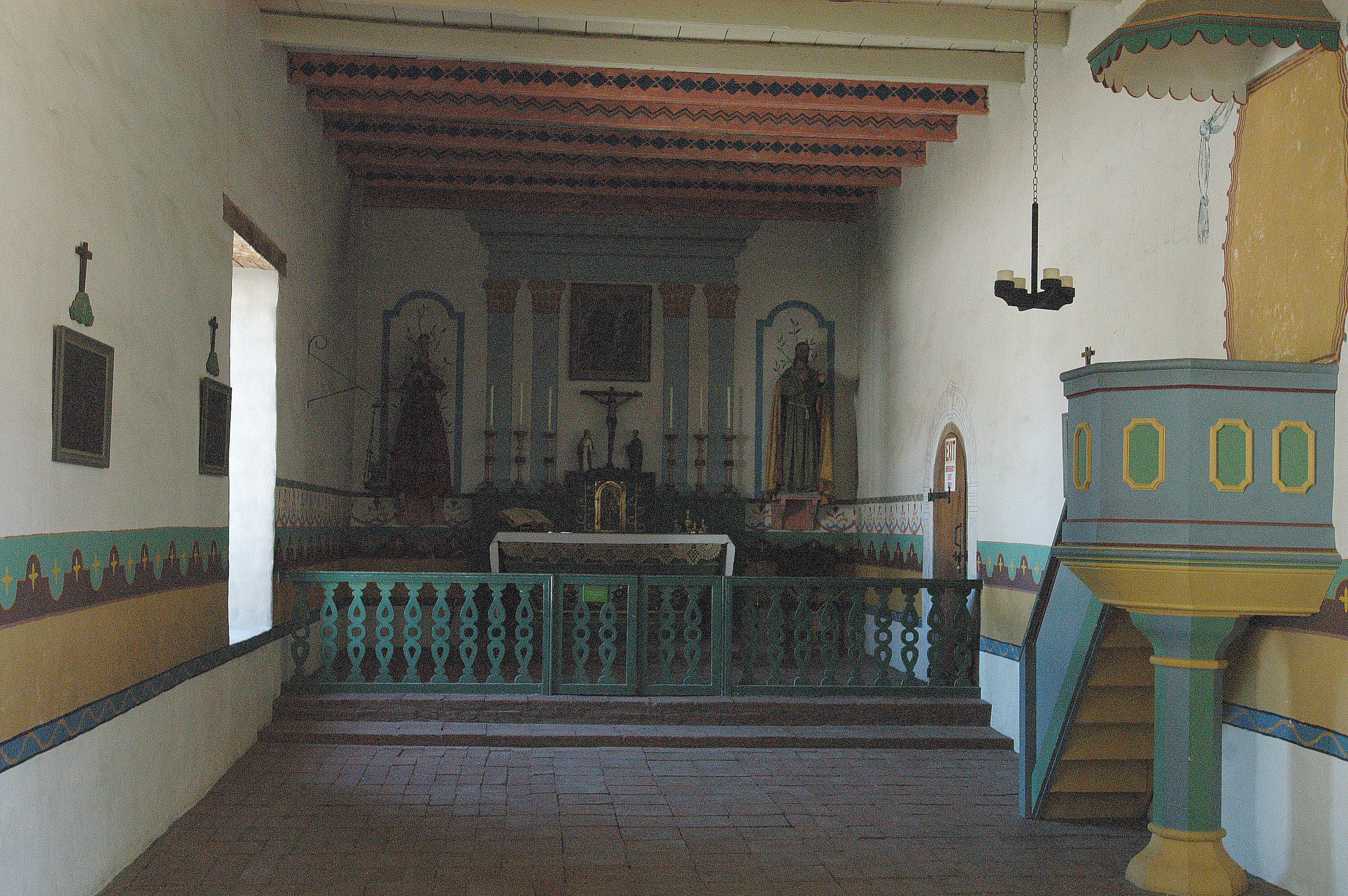
Interior of Vallejo's Chapel

In 1841, Mariano Vallejo ordered a small adobe chapel to be built on the location of the first wooden mission chapel. It became the church of the parish and replaced the large mission church which was rapidly deteriorating. It stood on the west end of the Convento and so is often thought to be the church of the old mission.

During 1863 President Abraham Lincoln transferred ownership of all the mission churches in California to the Roman Catholic Church. In 1881, the Sonoma church property was sold to a local businessman and a new parish church was built across town. At one time, the old adobe chapel was used as a warehouse. The Convento may have been used as a winery.

== Reconstruction, memorial and hospital ==
In 1903, the two remaining mission buildings were purchased by California Historic Landmarks League, and became part of the California Park System in 1906. In 1903, the Sonoma Valley Woman's Club raised $184 (equivalent to $6,593 in 2025) to help preserve the Sonoma Mission as a city landmark. In 1910, Club members got a lease on the property and raised $800 (equivalent to $27,643 in 2025) for repairs. They were assisted by the Native Sons of the Golden West of Sonoma. In 1911, club members petitioned the State Legislature, resulting in a appropriation of $5,000 (equivalent to $172,768 in 2025) to restore the Mission. By 1913, both had been reconstructed. After the 1940s, the former church and Convento were remodeled along more authentic lines suited to exhibits devoted exclusively to mission history.

Dedicated in 1999, the Sonoma Mission Indian Memorial honors the more than 800 native people (including over 200 children) who died while living and working at the Mission between 1824 and 1839. Their Christian names, as recorded by the priests in the Mission's records, are inscribed on this granite memorial. European diseases such as measles and smallpox, for which Native Americans had no inherited resistance, together with the overcrowded and unhealthy living conditions at all California missions (especially for women and children) contributed to the high death rate. However, the missions served, with the resources of the time, the health needs of its inhabitants, including those of Indian origin. Thus, the first hospital in California was founded in 1817 to care for the Indians of the Mission San Francisco de Asís, in what later became an independent Mission, the Mission San Rafael Arcangel, in San Rafael, California.

== California Historic Landmark ==
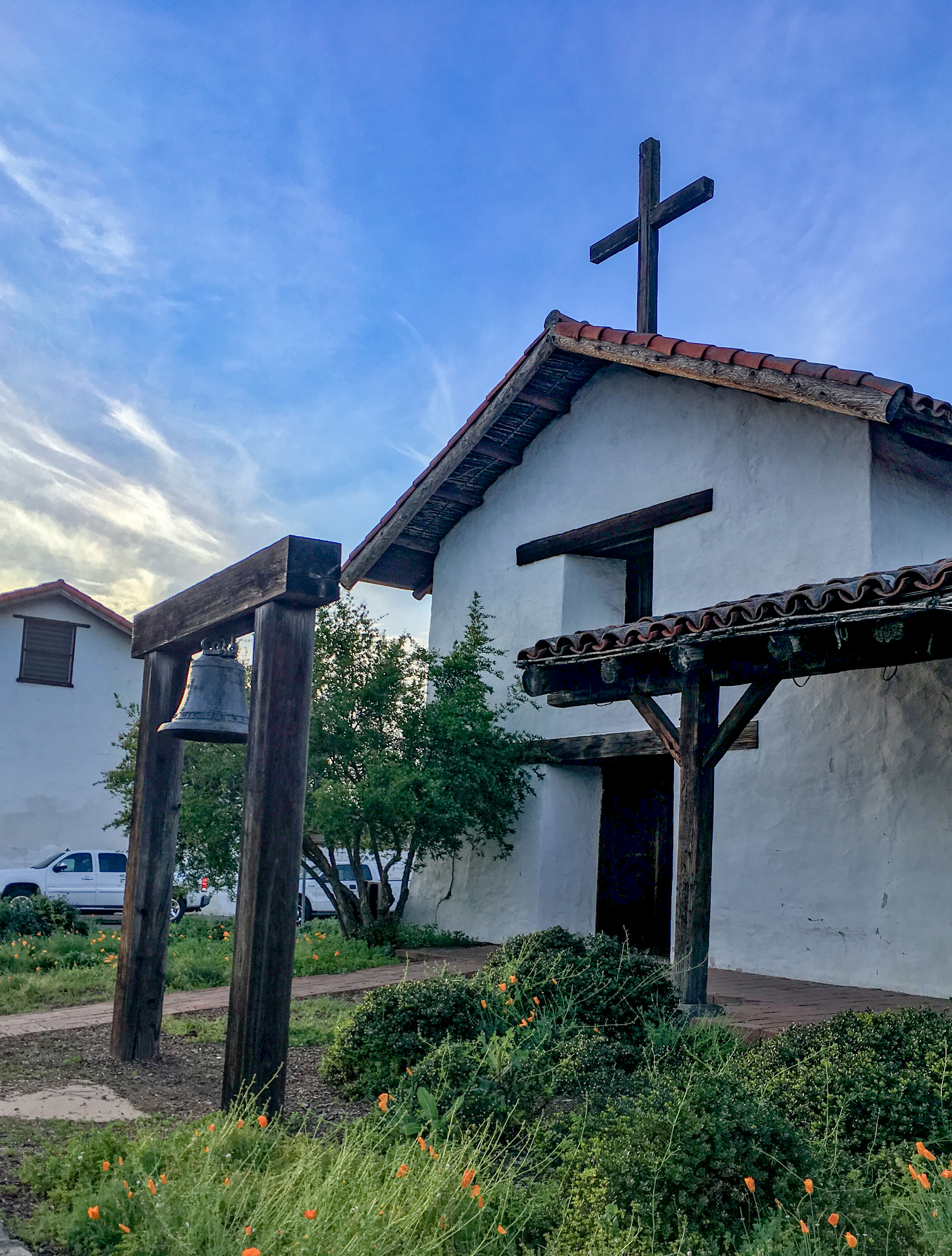
The Mission today

On June 1, 1932, Mission San Francisco Solano was designated California Historical Landmark #3.

== See also ==
- Spanish missions in California
  - List of Spanish missions in California
  - Mission San Gabriel
  - Mission San Rafael Arcángel
- El Presidio de Sonoma
  - USNS Mission Solano (AO-135) – a Mission Buenaventura Class fleet oiler built during World War II
  - Sonoma Plaza – the U.S. National Historic Landmark District in front of the mission
- Mission Guadalupe - the final Dominican mission to be founded, June 1834
- San Francisco Solano de Sonoma Mission Vineyard
- California Historical Landmarks in Sonoma County
