= Mission San Rafael Arcángel =

19th-century Franciscan mission in California

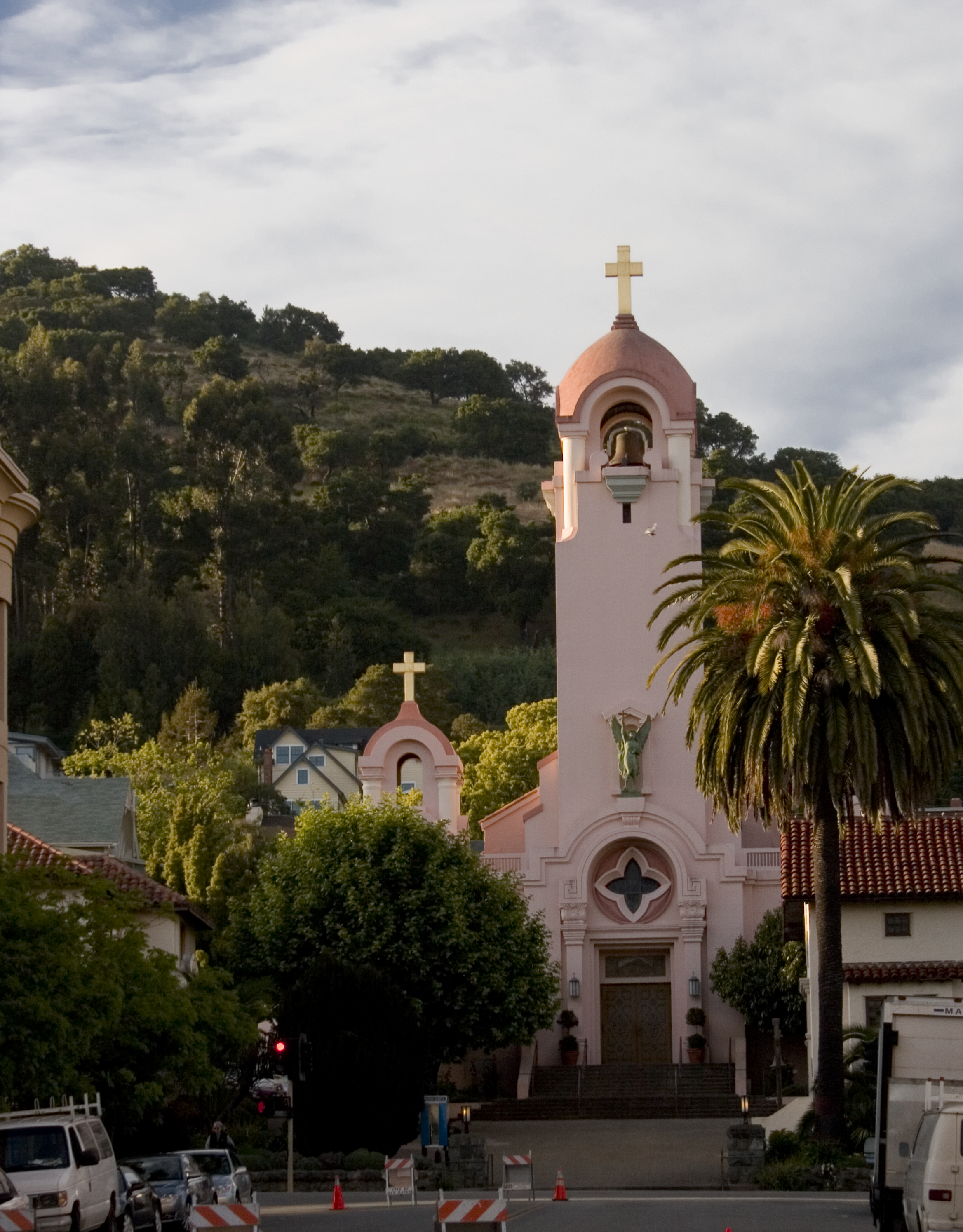
- The reconstructed capilla (chapel) of Mission San Rafael Arcángel is to the right of Saint Raphael's Church.

- Location within California
- Location: 1104 5th Avenue; San Rafael, California 94901-2916
- Coordinates: 37°58′27.6″N 122°31′40.5″W
- Name as founded: La Misión del Gloriosísimo Príncipe San Rafael Arcángel
- English translation: The Mission of the Most Glorious Prince Saint Raphael the Archangel
- Patron: Saint Raphael, Archangel
- Nickname: "Mission of Bodily Healing"
- Founded: December 14, 1817
- Founded by: Father Vicente Francisco de Sarría
- Founding Order: Twentieth
- Military district: Fourth
- Native tribe(s) Spanish name(s): Coast Miwok, Pomo
- Native place name: 'Anaguani
- Baptisms: 1,821
- Marriages: 519
- Burials: 652 (Note: Krell, p. 315: as of December 31, 1832; information adapted from Engelhardt's Missions and Missionaries of California.)
- Secularized: 1834
- Returned to the Church: 1855
- Governing body: Roman Catholic Archdiocese of San Francisco
- Current use: Chapel / Museum

California Historical Landmark
- Reference no.: 220

Website
- http://saintraphael.com

Mission San Rafael Arcángel (Spanish: La Misión del Gloriosísimo Príncipe San Rafael, Arcángel, lit. 'The Mission of the Most Glorious Prince, Archangel Saint Raphael') is a Spanish mission in San Rafael, California.

The original mission was founded in 1817 as an asistencia of Mission San Francisco de Asís to serve as a hospital to treat sick and injured indigenous people, making it Alta California's first sanitarium. The site's milder weather was believed to aid the rehabilitation of patients. It was not intended to be a stand-alone mission, but was granted full mission status in 1822 as it grew and prospered.

The mission fell into severe disrepair by the 1860's, giving it the ignoble distinction as the "most obliterated" Spanish mission in California. A new parish church was built in 1861 and the mission ruins were entirely removed in 1870. The site was replaced by the Saint Raphael Parish complex, where the modern-day replica was built in 1949, in front of the modern Saint Raphael's Church.

== History ==
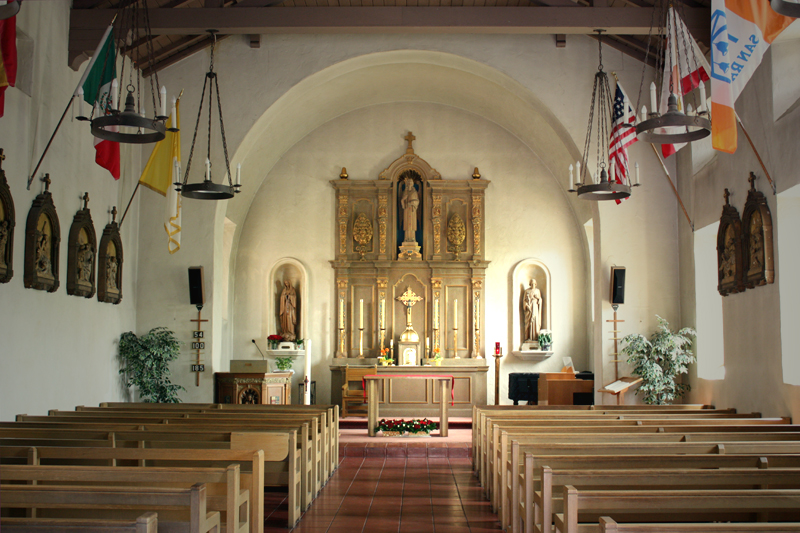
Interior of the capilla (chapel) at Mission San Rafael Arcángel taken in 1974.

Mission San Rafael Arcángel was founded on December 14, 1817, by Father Vicente Francisco de Sarría, as a medical asistencia ("sub-mission") of the San Francisco Mission to treat their sick population. After its opening, hundreds of indigenous people suffering from illness were transferred to the asistencia from the San Francisco Mission. It was granted full mission status on October 19, 1822. The mission's grain production in 1831 amounted to 774 fanegas of wheat, 130 of corn, 15 of beans, 388 of barley, and 20 of other legumes, amounting to 1327 fanegas of grain. In the same year, the mission owned 1200 heads of black cattle, 450 horses, 1 mule, 2000 sheep, and 17 pigs.

This was one of the missions turned over to the Mexican government in 1833 after the Mexican secularization act of 1833. According to Alexander Forbes, the 1835 mission population was 1027. In 1840, there were 150 Native Americans still at the Mission. By 1844, Mission San Rafael Arcángel had been abandoned; what was left of the empty buildings was sold for $8,000 in 1846. The Mission was used by John C. Fremont as his headquarters during the Bear Flag Revolt.

On June 28, 1846, three men departed the mission, including Kit Carson, and murdered three unarmed Californians under the order of John C. Fremont: Don José R. Berreyesa, father of José de los Santos Berreyesa, along with the twin sons of Don Francisco de Haro, Ramon and Francisco De Haro.

In 1847, a priest was once again living at the Mission. A new parish church was built near the old chapel ruins in 1861, and, in 1870, the rest of the ruins were removed to make room for the City of San Rafael. All that was left of the Mission was a single pear tree from the old Mission's orchard. It is for this reason that San Rafael is known as the "most obliterated of California's missions".

In 1949, a replica of the chapel was built next to the current Saint Raphael's Church on the site of the original hospital in San Rafael, California which was built in 1919.

== See also ==
- Spanish missions in California
- List of Spanish missions in California
- Chief Marin
- Mission San Francisco de Asís
- Mission San Francisco Solano
- USNS Mission San Rafael (AO-130) – a Buenaventura Class fleet oiler built during World War II.

== Bibliography ==
- Forbes, Alexander (1839). California: A History of Upper and Lower California. Cornhill, London: Smith, Elder and Co.
- Jones, Terry L; Klar, Kathryn A., eds. (2007). California Prehistory: Colonization, Culture, and Complexity. Landham, MD: Altimira Press. ISBN 978-0-7591-0872-1.
- Krell, Dorothy, ed. (1979). The California Missions: A Pictorial History. Menlo Park, CA: Sunset Publishing Corporation. ISBN 0-376-05172-8.
- Leffingwell, Randy (2005). California Missions and Presidios: The History & Beauty of the Spanish Missions. Stillwater, MN: Voyageur Press, Inc. ISBN 0-89658-492-5.
- Paddison, Joshua, ed. (1999). A World Transformed: Firsthand Accounts of California Before the Gold Rush. Berkeley, CA: Heyday Books. ISBN 1-890771-13-9.
- Ruscin, Terry (1999). Mission Memoirs. San Diego, CA: Sunbelt Publications. ISBN 0-932653-30-8.
- Yenne, Bill (2004). The Missions of California. San Diego, CA: Thunder Bay Press. ISBN 1-59223-319-8.
