= Nuestra Señora Reina de los Ángeles Asistencia =

Historical Catholic asistencia in Los Angeles, California

- "Los Ángeles Plaza" circa 1847. The "Plaza Church" (foreground, seen from the rear) occupies what remains of the Mission San Gabriel Arcángel asistencia site.

- Location within the Los Angeles metropolitan area
- Location: Los Angeles, California
- Coordinates: 34.0572°N 118.2396°W
- Name as founded: Asistencia de la Misión San Gabriel, Arcángel
- English translation: Sub-Mission of the Mission San Gabriel Arcángel
- Founded: 1784
- Military district: First
- Native tribe(s) Spanish name(s): Tongva; Gabrieliño
- Native place name: Yaanga
- Current use: Nonextant

Nuestra Señora Reina de los Ángeles Asistencia was founded in early 1784 in the burgeoning Pueblo de Los Ángeles adjacent to the village of Yaanga as an asistencia or "sub-mission" to the nearby Mission San Gabriel Arcángel. The assistant mission fell into disuse over time and a Catholic chapel, La Iglesia de Nuestra Señora Reina de los Ángeles, was constructed in its place a mere thirty years later.

== History ==
=== Asistencia de la Misión San Gabriel, Arcángel ===
In the first months of 1784, priests from San Gabriel established an assistant mission in the neighboring Pueblo de los Ángeles along the banks of El Río de Nuestra Señora la Reina de los Ángeles de Porciúncula, in an area with a high concentration of potential converts. At a half-a-day's ride to the east, the mother mission was too distant to serve the area effectively. Father Presidente Junípero Serra had the opportunity to visit the asistencia on March 18, 1784, just five months before his death. Perhaps more important than its duty to provide religious instruction to the local natives was the settlement's role in growing crops and grazing livestock to feed the inhabitants of Mission San Gabriel, whose padres divided their time between that outpost and the new site. The abundant water supply allowed for the planting of citrus orchards and raising of cattle in abundant numbers.

In time, however, the priests abandoned the site as the pueblo grew in population and the native poblanos moved away (few of the nuevos cristianos were welcomed in the pueblo). Relatively little of the site's physical record remains today.

=== La Iglesia de Nuestra Señora Reina de los Ángeles ===
On August 18, 1814 Fray Luis Gíl y Taboada placed the cornerstone of a new church amidst the ruins of the former asistencia to serve the local pobladores (settlers); the completed structure was dedicated on December 8, 1822. The padres of San Gabriel donated 7 barrels of brandy to help establish the new chapel. A replacement chapel, named for Mary, Mother of Jesus (La Iglesia de Nuestra Señora de los Ángeles, or "The Church of Our Lady of the Angels") was rebuilt utilizing materials of the original church in 1861; Reina, meaning "Queen," was added later. For years the little chapel, which collected the nicknames "La Placita" and "Plaza Church," served as the sole Roman Catholic church in Los Angeles. The Plaza area today is popularly known as Olvera Street.

== See also ==
- USNS Mission Los Angeles (AO-117) — a Mission Buenaventura-class fleet oiler built during World War II.
- List of Spanish missions in California
