= USNS Mission San Gabriel =

American tanker

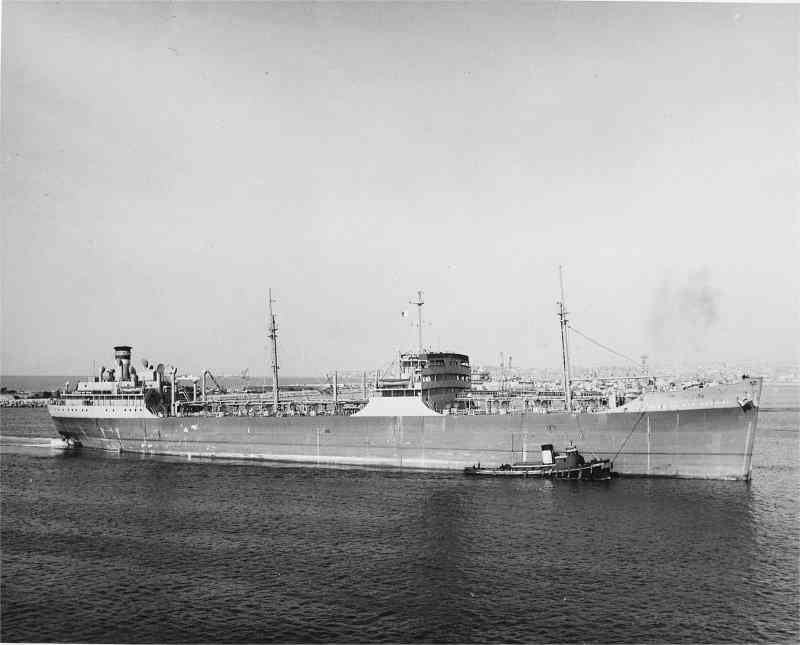
- USNS Mission San Gabriel (T-AO-124) underway in the harbor at Long Beach, California, date unknown

History

United States
- Name: Mission San Gabriel
- Builder: Marinship Corporation, Sausalito, California
- Laid down: 31 January 1944
- Launched: 17 April 1944
- Acquired: 27 May 1944
- Stricken: 20 December 1957
- Identification: IMO number: 6621208
- Fate: Scrapped December 1983

General characteristics
- Class & type: Mission Buenaventura-class oiler
- Displacement: 5,532 long tons (5,621 t) light; 21,880 long tons (22,231 t) full
- Length: 523 ft 6 in (159.56 m)
- Beam: 68 ft (21 m)
- Draft: 30 ft (9.1 m)
- Propulsion: Turbo-electric, single screw, 6,000 hp (4.47 MW)
- Speed: 16.5 knots (30.6 km/h; 19.0 mph)
- Complement: 52
- Armament: None

SS Mission San Gabriel was a Type T2-SE-A2 tanker built for the United States Maritime Commission during World War II. After the war she was acquired by the United States Navy as USS Mission San Gabriel (AO-124). Later the tanker transferred to the Military Sea Transportation Service as USNS Mission San Gabriel (T-AO-124). She was a member of the Mission Buenaventura-class oiler and was named for the Mission San Gabriel Arcángel, she was the only U.S. Naval vessel to bear the name.

== Career ==
Originally laid down as SS Mission San Gabriel on 31 January 1944 as a Maritime Commission type (T2-SE-A2) tanker hull under Maritime Commission contract (MC hull 1817) by Marine Ship Corporation, Sausalito, California; launched on 17 April 1944, sponsored by Mrs. Ralph Meyers: and delivered on 27 May 1944.

Chartered to Deconhill Shipping Company, on 28 May 1944, for the remainder of the war, she supplied oil to U.S. and Allied Forces in the Pacific. Returned to the Maritime Commission in early February 1946, she was transferred to the Reserve Fleet and laid up on 28 February 1946. Acquired by the Navy on 14 October 1947, she was transferred to the Naval Transportation Service on the same day for service as Mission San Gabriel (AO‑124) and was operated, under charter, by Pacific Tankers, Inc. Upon the founding of the Military Sea Transportation Service (MSTS) on 1 October 1949, she was absorbed into this service and continued operations until 28 December 1949, when she was returned to the Navy and laid up at San Diego as part of the U.S. Navy Pacific Reserve Fleet.

With the commencement of the Korean War, the Mission San Gabriel was taken out of mothballs and placed in service with MSTS on 18 July 1950 as USNS Mission San Gabriel (T‑AO‑124). She helped support U.S. forces in Korea until 31 March 1954, when she was taken out of service and mothballed at the San Diego group of the Pacific Reserve Fleet.

Once again, the faithful tanker's service was needed and on 8 October 1956, she was taken out of mothballs and placed in service for duty with MSTS. Her service with MSTS was short this time, and on 20 December 1957, she was taken out of service and transferred to the Maritime Administration (MARAD) Reserve Fleet at Suisun Bay for berthing. She was stricken from the Naval Vessel Register on the same date.

In early 1966 Mission San Gabriel's call to duty came again. Sold to the Hudson Waterways Corporation on 24 June 1966 she was converted into a container ship by Savannah Machine and Foundry and renamed SS Seatrain Delaware, IMO 6621208, on 21 November 1966. In early 1967, she departed the yards and began her new career carrying containerized cargo for Seatrain Lines between the east and west coasts of the United States and to Puerto Rico. On 30 June 1972 the ship was chartered to Tyler Tanker Corp, and in 1973 she was returned to the Reserve Fleet (James River). She was renamed Delaware on 8 August 1978, and on 16 October 1983 the ship was sold for scrapping in Spain.
