= USNS Mission Purisima =

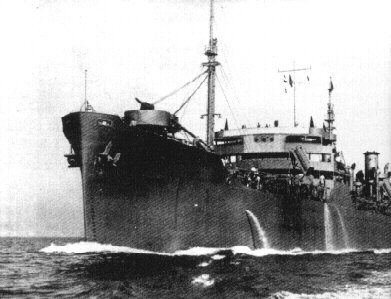
- USNS Mission Purisima

History

United States
- Name: Mission Purisima
- Namesake: Mission La Purísima Concepción in Lompoc, California
- Builder: Marinship Corporation, Sausalito, California
- Laid down: 10 June 1943
- Launched: 25 August 1943
- In service: 23 November 1943
- Out of service: 27 April 1946
- Acquired: 15 October 1947
- In service: 15 October 1947
- Out of service: 16 May 1955
- Stricken: 16 May 1955
- Acquired: 26 June 1956
- In service: 26 June 1956
- Out of service: 4 December 1957
- Stricken: 4 December 1957
- Identification: IMO number: 5237177
- Fate: Scrapped 27 April 1976

General characteristics
- Class & type: Mission Buenaventura-class oiler
- Displacement: 5,532 long tons (5,621 t) light; 21,880 long tons (22,231 t) full
- Length: 524 ft (160 m)
- Beam: 68 ft (21 m)
- Draft: 30 ft (9.1 m)
- Propulsion: Turbo-electric, single screw, 6,000 hp (4.47 MW)
- Speed: 16.5 knots (30.6 km/h; 19.0 mph)
- Complement: 52
- Armament: None

SS Mission Purisima was a Type T2-SE-A2 tanker built for the United States Maritime Commission during World War II. After the war, she was acquired by the United States Navy as USS Mission Purisima (AO-118). Later the tanker transferred to the Military Sea Transportation Service as USNS Mission Purisima (T-AO-118). She was a member of the Mission Buenaventura-class oiler and was named for Mission La Purísima Concepción near Lompoc, California.

== Service history ==
Mission Purisma was laid down on 10 June 1943 under a Maritime Commission contract by Marinship Corporation, Sausalito, California; launched 25 August 1943, sponsored by Mrs. John Collins; and delivered 23 November 1943. Chartered to Deconhill Shipping Company for operations, she carried fuel to allied forces in the Pacific and the Atlantic theaters until 27 April 1946, when she was returned to the Maritime Commission and laid up in the Maritime Reserve Fleet at Suisun Bay, California.

Acquired by the Navy on 15 October 1947 she was placed in service with Naval Transportation Service as Mission Purisma (AO-118) and continued serving in the Transportation Service until taken over by the new Military Sea Transportation Service on 1 October 1949 and designated USNS Mission Purisma (T-AO-118). She served with MSTS until 16 May 1955 when she was returned to the Maritime Administration and laid up in the Maritime Reserve Fleet at Olympia, Washington. She was struck from the Naval Vessel Register on the same date.

Reacquired by the Navy on 26 June 1956 she was placed in service with MSTS and served until returned to MARAD on 4 December 1957 and laid up at the Maritime Reserve Fleet at Suisun Bay. Again struck from the Naval Vessel Register that same date, she remained berthed at Suisun Bay into 1969.

The ship was sold for scrapping to American Ship Dismantlers, Inc. on 27 April 1976.

== See also ==
- Original Mission La Purísima

== Awards ==
During her active military service she was awarded the National Defense Service Medal, the Korean Service Medal, the United Nations Service Medal and the Republic of Korea War Service Medal (retroactively).
