= USNS Mission San Luis Obispo =

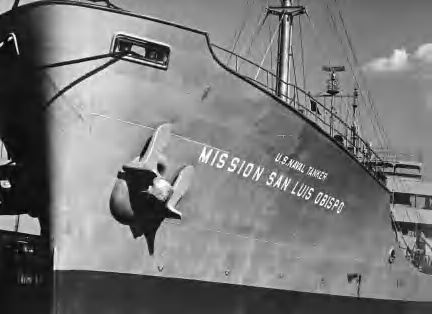
- USNS Mission San Luis Obispo

History

United States
- Name: Mission San Luis Obispo
- Builder: Marinship Corporation, Sausalito, California
- Laid down: 18 April 1944
- Launched: 18 June 1944
- Commissioned: 15 July 1944
- Stricken: 24 September 1957
- Identification: IMO number: 6700468
- Fate: Scrapped 1986

General characteristics
- Class & type: Mission Buenaventura-class oiler
- Displacement: 5,532 long tons (5,621 t) light; 21,880 long tons (22,231 t) full
- Length: 524 ft (160 m)
- Beam: 68 ft (21 m)
- Draft: 30 ft (9.1 m)
- Propulsion: Turbo-electric, single screw, 6,000 hp (4.47 MW)
- Speed: 16.5 knots (30.6 km/h; 19.0 mph)
- Complement: 52
- Armament: None

SS Mission San Luis Obispo was a Type T2-SE-A2 tanker built for the United States Maritime Commission during World War II. After the war, she was acquired by the United States Navy as USS Mission San Luis Obispo (AO-127). Later the tanker transferred to the Military Sea Transportation Service as USNS Mission San Luis Obispo (T-AO-127). A Mission Buenaventura-class oiler, she was named for Mission San Luís Obispo de Tolosa in San Luis Obispo, California.

== Career ==
Mission San Luis Obispo was laid down on 18 April 1944 under a Maritime Commission contract by Marine Ship Corporation, Sausalito, California; launched on 18 June 1944, sponsored by Mrs. George A. Patterson; and delivered on 15 July 1944. Chartered to Pacific Tankers, Inc. for operations, she spent the remainder of the War carrying fuel to our forces in the Pacific (during which time she was awarded the National Defense Service Medal). She remained in this capacity until 27 March 1946 when she was returned to the Maritime Commission and laid up in the Maritime Reserve Fleet at James River, Virginia.

Acquired by the Navy on 24 October 1947 she was placed in service with the Naval Transportation Service as Mission San Luis Obispo (AO-127). She was transferred to the operational control of the newly created Military Sea Transportation Service (MSTS) on 1 October 1949 as USNS Mission San Luis Obispo (T-AO-127). She served with MSTS until 22 June 1955 when she was returned to the U.S. Maritime Administration (MARAD) and laid up in the Maritime Reserve Fleet at Olympia, Washington. Reacquired by the Navy on 27 June 1956, she was placed in service with MSTS and served until 24 June 1957, when she was returned to MARAD and laid up in the Maritime Reserve Fleet at Beaumont, Texas. She was struck from the Naval Vessel Register on 24 September 1957.

The ship was sold to the Hudson Waterways Corporation on 25 March 1966 and was renamed Seatrain Puerto Rico on 1 April 1966. She was subsequently lengthened using part of the midsection of another T2 tanker, the Fruitvale Hills, and rebuilt by Newport News Shipbuilding into one of seven Seatrain Lines multi-purpose cargo ships capable of carrying general bulk and palletized cargo, intermodal containers, vehicles, and rail cars. Upon completion of the conversion and delivery in January 1967 Seatrain Puerto Rico, IMO 6700468, was chartered to the MSTS in support of overseas U.S. military operations, including the transport of material, equipment, and aircraft to Vietnam. The ship was transferred to the National Defense Reserve Fleet (James River) on 19 December 1974, and on 27 May 1977, her name was changed to Puerto Rico. The ship was retired and broken up in 1986.
