= USNS Mission Santa Ynez =

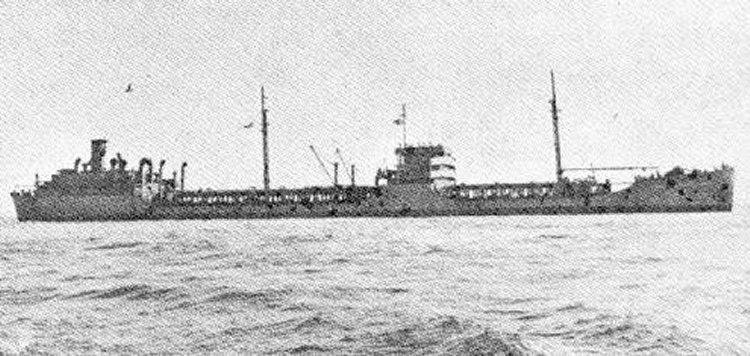
- USNS Mission Santa Ynez

History

United States
- Name: Mission Santa Ynez
- Builder: Marinship Corporation, Sausalito, California
- Laid down: 9 September 1943
- Launched: 19 December 1943
- Commissioned: 13 March 1944
- Decommissioned: n/a
- Identification: IMO number: 8450627
- Fate: Sold for scrap, April 2010
- Notes: Last T-2 tanker in the world when scrapped

General characteristics
- Class & type: Mission Buenaventura-class oiler
- Displacement: 5,532 long tons (5,621 t) light; 21,880 long tons (22,231 t) full
- Length: 524 ft (160 m)
- Beam: 68 ft (21 m)
- Draft: 30 ft (9.1 m)
- Propulsion: Turbo-electric, single screw, 6,000 hp (4.47 MW)
- Speed: 16.5 knots (30.6 km/h; 19.0 mph)
- Complement: 52
- Armament: None

External media

Images
- USNS Mission Santa Ynez Set from Flickr, uploaded by Robert Hart

Video
- USNS Mission Santa Ynez in Drydock (Flash format) from YouTube, uploaded by Delfinmar

SS Mission Santa Ynez was a Type T2-SE-A2 tanker built for the United States Maritime Commission during World War II. After the war she was acquired by the United States Navy as USS Mission Santa Ynez (AO-134). Later the tanker transferred to the Military Sea Transportation Service as USNS Mission Santa Ynez (T-AO-134). A Mission Buenaventura-class oiler, she was named for Mission Santa Inés located in Solvang, California.

The Mission Santa Ynez, the last T-2 tanker in existence, was stored at Suisun Bay as part of the Suisun Bay Reserve Fleet from 1975 until April 2010 when a lawsuit forced the U.S. Maritime Administration (MARAD) to remove her. The tanker was transported to a ship recycling facility in Brownsville, Texas via the Panama Canal in May 2010 for scrapping by Esco Marine.

== Career ==
Mission Santa Ynez was laid down 9 September 1943 under a Maritime Commission contract by Marinship Corporation, Sausalito, California; launched 19 December 1943; sponsored by Mrs. Ralph K. Davies; and delivered 13 March 1944. Chartered to Pacific Tankers, Inc., for operations, she spent the remainder of the War carrying fuel to our forces overseas. She remained in this capacity until 28 March 1946 when she was returned to the Maritime Commission and laid up in the Maritime reserve Fleet at James River, Virginia.

Acquired by the Navy 22 October 1947 she was placed in service with the Naval Transportation Service as Mission Santa Ynez (AO-134). Taken over by the newly created Military Sea Transportation Service 1 October 1949 she was redesignated USNS Mission Santa Ynez (T-AO-134). Chartered to Mathiasens Tanker Industries, Inc., for operations, she entered the Maritime Administration's Suisun Bay Reserve Fleet on 6 March 1975. She was the last T-2 tanker extant. Towed from the Maritime reserve Fleet at Suisun Bay, California on 31 March 2010, headed for dismantling in Texas via the Panama Canal.

During her active duty, she was awarded the National Defense Service Medal (twice), the Korean Service Medal, the United Nations Service Medal and the Republic of Korea War Service Medal (retroactively).
