= USNS Mission San Francisco =

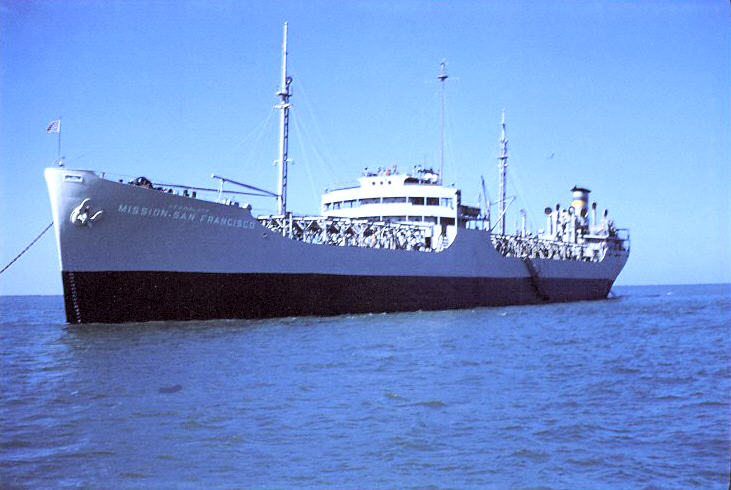
- USNS Mission San Francisco

History

United States
- Name: Mission San Francisco
- Builder: Marinship Corporation
- Laid down: 5 May 1945
- Launched: 18 September 1945
- In service: 28 October 1947
- Out of service: 20 March 1957
- Fate: Sunk, 1957

General characteristics
- Class & type: Mission Buenaventura-class oiler
- Displacement: 5,532 long tons (5,621 t) light; 21,880 long tons (22,231 t) full
- Length: 524 ft (160 m)
- Beam: 68 ft (21 m)
- Draft: 30 ft (9.1 m)
- Propulsion: Turbo-electric, single screw, 6,000 hp (4.47 MW)
- Speed: 16.5 knots (30.6 km/h; 19.0 mph)
- Complement: 52
- Armament: None

USNS Mission San Francisco (T-AO-123) was a Mission Buenaventura-class oiler that served in the United States Navy. The ship was originally intended as USS Contoocook (AO-104) for the U.S. Navy but her acquisition was canceled. The ship, a Type T2-SE-A3 tanker, was completed as SS Mission San Francisco and delivered after the end of World War II. The tanker was acquired by the U.S. Navy in 1947 as USS Mission San Francisco (AO-123), but was transferred to the Military Sea Transport Service (MSTS) upon its creation in 1949. During a second stint with the MSTS that began in 1954, Mission San Francisco collided with the freighter Elna II in the Delaware River coast and was declared unsalvageable by the U.S. Navy. The ship was one of two U.S. Navy vessels named for the Franciscan mission of San Francisco de Asís located in San Francisco, California.

== Career ==
Mission San Francisco was laid down on 5 May 1945 as Contocook under a Maritime Commission contract by Marinship Corporation, Sausalito, California; launched on 18 September 1945, sponsored by Mrs. John J. Manning; and delivered on 11 October 1945. Chartered to Deconhill Shipping Company, upon her delivery, for operations, she served until 14 April 1946 when she was returned to the Maritime Commission and laid up in the Maritime Reserve Fleet at Mobile, Alabama.

Acquired by the Navy on 28 October 1947, she was placed in service with the Naval Transportation Service as Mission San Francisco (AO-123). Taken over by the Military Sea Transportation Service on 1 October 1949 she was redesignated USNS Mission San Francisco (T-AO-123) and served under MSTS until 18 January 1954, when she was returned to the Maritime Administration and laid up in the Maritime Reserve Fleet at Beaumont, Texas.

Reacquired by the Navy on 20 October 1956, she was once again placed in service with MSTS and chartered to Mathiasens Tanker Industries. Her period of service with MSTS was short. On 7 March 1957 while passing New Castle, Delaware, she collided with the Liberian freighter Elna II. The shock of the collision caused Mission San Francisco to catch fire and explode, breaking her in two. The explosion killed 10 men, including her master, Capt. William Allen. Immediately after the collision, Elna II backed off but in her attempts to avoid the burning hulk she ran aground. Due to bad weather, rescue attempts were slow, but all aboard Elna II and the survivors of Mission San Francisco were rescued by the United States Coast Guard. Declared unsalvageable by the Navy, Mission San Francisco was stricken from the Naval Vessel Register on 20 March 1957.
