= USNS Mission San Rafael =

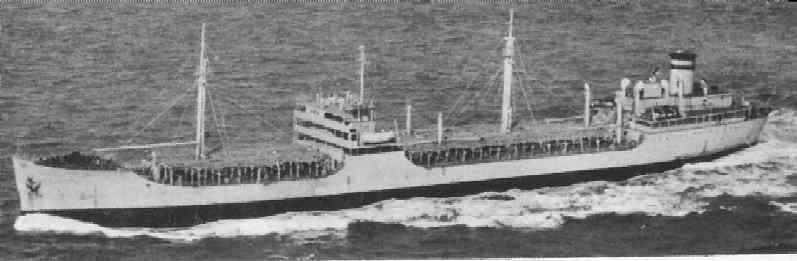
- USNS Mission San Rafael (T-AO-130) underway with a deck cargo of oil drums, date and location unknown.

History

United States
- Name: Mission San Rafael
- Builder: Marinship Corporation, Sausalito, California
- Laid down: 25 September 1943
- Launched: 31 December 1943
- In service: 22 March 1944
- Out of service: 25 April 1946
- In service: 21 October 1947
- Out of service: 2 February 1955
- Stricken: 22 June 1955
- In service: 20 June 1956
- Out of service: 20 August 1959
- In service: 31 May 1960
- Fate: Scrapped at Baltimore June 1971

General characteristics
- Class & type: Mission Buenaventura-class oiler
- Displacement: 1,625 long tons (1,651 t) light; 21,880 long tons (22,231 t) full
- Length: 524 ft (160 m)
- Beam: 68 ft (21 m)
- Draft: 30 ft (9.1 m)
- Propulsion: Turbo-electric, single screw, 6,000 hp (4.47 MW)
- Speed: 16.5 knots (30.6 km/h; 19.0 mph)
- Complement: 52

SS Mission San Rafael was a Type T2-SE-A2 tanker built for the United States Maritime Commission during World War II. After the war she was acquired by the United States Navy as USS Mission San Rafael (AO-130). Later the tanker transferred to the Military Sea Transportation Service as USNS Mission San Rafael (T-AO-130). She was a member of the Mission Buenaventura-class oiler and was named for Mission San Rafael Arcángel, she was the only U.S. Naval vessel to bear the name.

== Service history ==
Originally laid down as SS Mission San Rafael on 25 September 1943 as a Maritime Commission type (T2-SE-A2) tanker hull under a Maritime Commission contract by the Marine Ship Corporation, Sausalito, California; launched on 31 December 1943, sponsored by Mrs. Edith S. Waterman; and delivered on 22 March 1944.

Chartered to Los Angeles Tanker Operators, Inc. for operations on the same date, she spent the remainder of the war carrying fuel to U.S. forces in the western Pacific (during which time she was awarded the National Defense Service Medal). She remained in this capacity until 25 April 1946 when she was transferred to the Maritime Commission and laid up in the Maritime Reserve Fleet at Olympia, Washington.

Acquired by the Navy on 21 October 1947 she was chartered to Union Oil Company for operations and placed under the operational control of the Naval Transportation Service as Mission San Rafael (AO-130). Transferred to the control of the newly created Military Sea Transportation Service (MSTS) on 1 October 1949 she was redesignated USNS Mission San Rafael (T-AO-130). She remained with MSTS until 2 February 1955 when she was returned to MARAD and laid up in the Maritime Reserve Fleet at Olympia. She was struck from the Naval Vessel Register on 22 June 1955.

Reacquired by the Navy on 20 June 1956 she was once again placed in service with MSTS and was operated, under charter, by Marine Transport Lines. She served until 20 August 1959 when she was returned to MARAD and laid up in the Maritime Reserve Fleet at Suisun Bay, California. Reacquired by the Navy on 31 May 1960 she was placed in service with MSTS and operated, under charter, by Marine Transport Lines. Into 1969, she was still serving with MSTS, carrying fuel to U.S. forces stationed overseas.

She was scrapped at Baltimore in June 1971.

== See also ==
- Mission San Rafael Arcángel
