= USNS Mission Dolores =

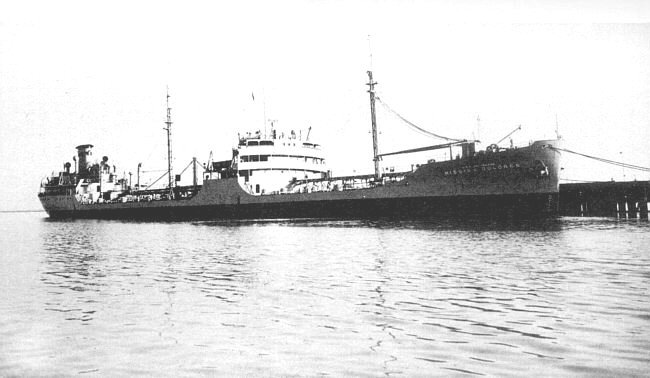
- USNS Mission Dolores

History

United States
- Name: Mission Dolores
- Builder: Marine Ship Corporation, Sausalito, California
- Laid down: 18 February 1944
- Launched: 26 April 1944, as SS Mission Dolores
- In service: 31 May 1944
- Out of service: 17 May 1946
- Acquired: by US Navy, 20 October 1947
- In service: 20 October 1947, as Mission Dolores (AO-115)
- Out of service: 30 March 1955
- Reclassified: USNS Mission Dolores (T-AO-115), 1 October 1949
- Stricken: 22 June 1955
- Acquired: by US Navy, 27 June 1956
- In service: 27 June 1956
- Out of service: 19 September 1957
- Stricken: 19 September 1957
- Identification: IMO number: 5237165
- Fate: Sold into commercial service, 21 April 1969; Scrapped, May 1984

General characteristics
- Class & type: Mission Buenaventura-class oiler
- Displacement: 5,532 long tons (5,621 t) light; 21,880 long tons (22,231 t) full
- Length: 524 ft (160 m)
- Beam: 68 ft (21 m)
- Draft: 30 ft (9.1 m)
- Speed: 16.5 knots (30.6 km/h; 19.0 mph)
- Complement: 52
- Armament: None

SS Mission Dolores was a Mission Buenaventura-class oiler built for the United States Maritime Commission during World War II, named for Mission San Francisco de Asís in San Juan Capistrano, California, one of two named for the Franciscan mission located in San Francisco, California.

After the war she was acquired by the United States Navy as USS Mission Dolores (AO-115). Later the tanker transferred to the Military Sea Transportation Service as USNS Mission Dolores (T-AO-115).

== Service history ==
=== Charter ship, 1944–1946 ===
SS Mission Dolores was laid down as a Type T2-SE-A2 tanker on 18 February 1944 under a Maritime Commission contract by the Marine Ship Corporation of Sausalito, California. Launched on 26 April 1944, sponsored by Mrs. William E. Briggs, the ship was delivered on 31 May 1944.

Chartered to Pacific Tankers, Inc., on 31 May, for operations, she spent the remainder of the war providing fuel products to Allied forces in the Pacific. Returned to the Maritime Commission on 17 May 1946 she was laid up in the Maritime Reserve Fleet at Olympia, Washington.

=== Navy transport, 1947–1957 ===
Acquired by the Navy on 20 October 1947 she was designated as USS Mission Dolores (AO-115) and transferred to the Naval Transportation Service for service. Operating under charter by Union Oil Company, she carried fuel and oil to US forces and Allies overseas, and continued in this duty after the Naval Transportation Service had been replaced by the Military Sea Transportation Service. From 1 October 1949, the date MSTS was created, until May 1955, she operated as USNS Mission Dolores (T-AO-115). Returned to the Maritime Administration on 22 June 1955 she was laid up in the Maritime Reserve Fleet at Olympia. She was struck from the Naval Vessel Register on the same date.

Reacquired by the Navy on 27 June 1956 she was placed in service with MSTS on the same date and served with them until returned to the Maritime Reserve Fleet at Olympia, on 19 September 1957.

=== Sold into commercial service, 1969–1984 ===
On 21 April 1969 the ship was transferred by MARAD, to Sea-Land Service Inc. for conversion to a container ship, and renamed SS Tampa on 30 October 1969. Sold to Reynolds Leasing Corp., on 24 September 1970, she was scrapped in May 1984.
