= List of Spanish missions in California =

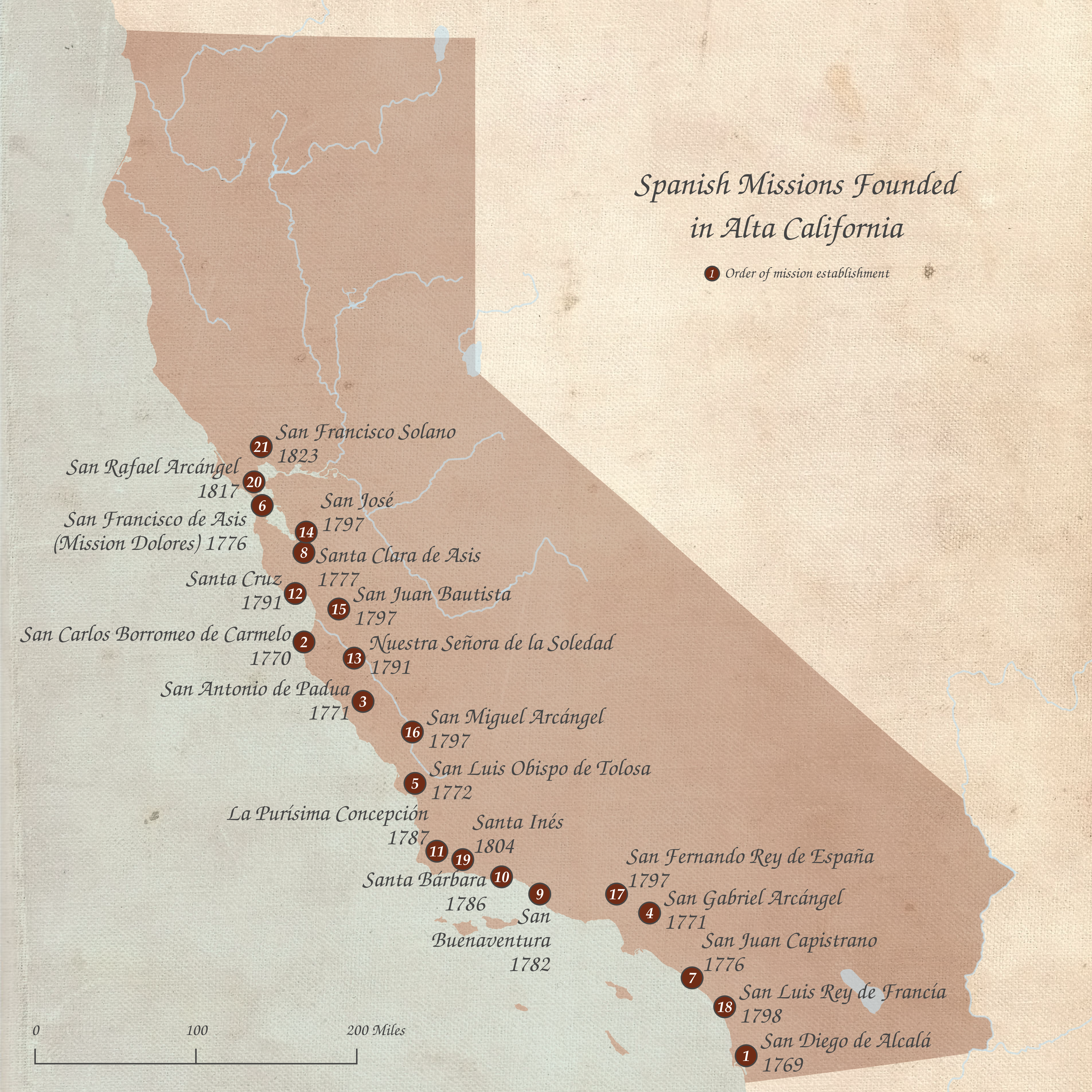
The horse and mule trail known as El Camino Real as of 1821 and the locations of the 21 Franciscan missions in Alta California

Franciscan priests established 21 missions between 1769 and 1833 in Alta California, accompanied by military outposts. Their goal was to spread Christianity among the local Native Americans, as well as to affirm Spanish, and later Mexican, claims to the region.

== Overview ==
To facilitate overland travel, the mission settlements were situated approximately 30 miles (48 kilometers) apart, about one day's journey on horseback, or three days on foot. The entire trail eventually became a 600-mile (966-kilometer) long "California Mission Trail." Rev. Lasuén successfully argued that filling in the empty spaces along El Camino Real with additional outposts would provide much-needed rest stops where travelers could take lodging in relative safety and comfort. Heavy freight movement was practical only via water. Tradition has it that the padres sprinkled mustard seeds along the trail to mark it with bright yellow flowers.

Today a growing number of people, calling themselves California Mission Walkers, hike the mission trail route, usually in segments between the missions. Walking the trail is a way to connect with the history of the missions. For some it represents a spiritual pilgrimage, inspired by Jesuit priest Richard Roos' 1985 book, Christwalk. The loosely organized group is attempting to formalize the route and establish markers, similar to the 330-mile (530 km) El Camino de Santiago, in Spain.

== Missions ==
There were 21 missions, 8 asistencias, and 5 estancias in what is now California.

List of missions in geographical order, north to south
Name	Image	Date	Location	Notes
Mission San Francisco Solano		1823	Sonoma; 38°17′38″N 122°27′20″W	Originally planned as an asistencia of Mission San Rafael Arcángel. Serves as a museum.
Mission San Rafael Arcángel		1817	San Rafael; 37°58′27″N 122°31′40″W	Nonextant. Originally planned as the third asistencia of Mission San Francisco de Asís. A reconstruction of the original mission was completed in 1949, which served as a parish church and museum.
Mission San Francisco de Asís		1776	San Francisco; 37°45′51″N 122°25′37″W	Also known as Mission Dolores. Serves as a parish church.
Mission San José		1797	Fremont; 37°31′58″N 121°55′10″W	Serves as a parish church and museum.
Mission Santa Clara de Asís		1777	Santa Clara; 37°20′57″N 121°56′29″W	Serves as a parish church within Santa Clara University.
Mission Santa Cruz		1791	Santa Cruz; 36°58′41″N 122°1′45″W	Nonextant. A reconstruction of the original mission was completed in the 1930s, which serves as a parish church and museum.
Mission San Juan Bautista		1797	San Juan Bautista; 36°50′42″N 121°32′9″W	Serves as a parish church.
Mission San Carlos Borromeo de Carmelo		1770	Carmel; 36°32′33″N 121°55′11″W	Serves as a parish church and museum.
Mission Nuestra Señora de la Soledad		1791	Soledad; 36°24′16″N 121°21′20″W	In ruins. A reconstruction of the original mission was completed in 1955, which serves as a parish church and museum.
Mission San Antonio de Padua		1771	near Jolon; 36°00′54″N 121°15′00″W	Serves as a parish church and museum.
Mission San Miguel Arcángel		1797	San Miguel; 35°44′41″N 120°41′53″W	Serves as a parish church and museum.
Mission San Luis Obispo de Tolosa		1772	San Luis Obispo; 35°16′50″N 120°39′52″W	Serves as a parish church and museum.
Mission La Purísima Concepción		1787	Lompoc; 34°40′13″N 120°25′14″W	Serves as a museum.
Mission Santa Inés		1804	Solvang; 34°35′40″N 120°08′11″W	Serves as a parish church and museum.
Mission Santa Barbara		1786	Santa Barbara; 34°26′18″N 119°42′50″W	Serves as a parish church and friary.
Mission San Buenaventura		1782	Ventura; 34°16′52″N 119°17′53″W	Serves as a parish church and museum.
Mission San Fernando Rey de España		1797	Los Angeles; 34°16′23″N 118°27′40″W	Serves as a parish church and museum.
Mission San Gabriel		1771	San Gabriel; 34°5′50″N 118°6′22″W	The current mission church dates to 1805. Serves as a parish church and museum.
Mission San Juan Capistrano		1776	San Juan Capistrano; 33°30′10″N 117°39′46″W	The Serra Chapel, built in 1782, is the oldest extant building in California. Serves as a parish church and museum.
Mission San Luis Rey de Francia		1798	Oceanside; 33°13′57″N 117°19′12″W	Serves as a parish church, museum, and religious retreat center.
Mission San Diego de Alcalá		1769	San Diego; 32°47′4″N 117°6′23″W	Serves as a parish church and museum.

Two Franciscan missions, Mission Puerto de Purísima Concepción and Mission San Pedro y San Pablo de Bicuñer, were constructed within the present-day borders of California but were administered as part of the Spanish missions of Pimería Alta. As such, they are not considered a part of the 21 missions of Alta California.

=== Asistencias ===
Asistencias were branch missions that allowed the priests to extend their reach into the native population at a modest cost.

List of Asistencias in geographical order, north to south
Name	Image	Date	Location	Notes
Santa Eulalia Asistencia		1824	Cordelia; 38°14′16″N 122°07′28″W	The ruins are preserved behind a business park at the intersection of Sandstone Way and Westamerica Drive.
San Pedro y San Pablo Asistencia		1786	Pacifica; 37°35′14″N 122°29′36″W	Nonextant. First asistencia of Mission San Francisco de Asís.
Mission Dolores Asistencia		1793–94	San Mateo; 37°33′55″N 122°19′40″W	Nonextant. Second asistencia of Mission San Francisco de Asís. A granary was built south of San Mateo Creek in 1793–94 before being destroyed during an 1808 earthquake. A new adobe granary was built north of the creek before being demolished in 1868.
Santa Margarita de Cortona Asistencia		1787	Santa Margarita; 35°24′2″N 120°36′44″W	Asistencia of Mission San Luis Obispo de Tolosa. The ruins are preserved within a barn on Santa Margarita Ranch (private).
Santa Paula Asistencia		c.1800	Santa Paula; 34°21′21″N 119°03′03″W	Nonextant. Asistencia of Mission San Buenaventura. Little else is known.
Nuestra Señora Reina de los Ángeles Asistencia		1784	Los Angeles; 34°03′26″N 118°14′23″W	Nonextant. Asistencia of Mission San Gabriel Arcángel. The site is occupied by La Iglesia de Nuestra Señora la Reina de los Ángeles.
Santa Ysabel Asistencia		1818	Santa Ysabel; 33°7′49″N 116°40′41″W	Nonextant. Asistencia of Mission San Diego de Alcalá. A new chapel was constructed in 1924. Serves as a parish church and museum.
San Antonio de Pala Asistencia		1816	Pala Indian Reservation; 33°21′40″N 117°04′45″W	Asistencia of Mission San Luis Rey de Francia. The chapel serves as a parish church and museum.

=== Estancias ===
An estancia or estância is a Spanish or Portuguese term describing private landholdings used for farming or raising livestock. They assisted in the development of their parent missions.

List of Estancias in geographical order, north to south
Name	Image	Date	Location	Notes
San Marcos Estancia		c.1800	near Santa Ynez; 34°32′50″N 119°52′40″W	Nonextant. Estancia of Mission Santa Barbara. Little else is known.
San Francisco Xavier Estancia		1804	Castaic Junction; 34°25′58″N 118°36′19″W	Nonextant. Estancia of Mission San Fernando Rey de España.
San Bernardino de Sena Estancia		1819	Redlands; 34°02′40″N 117°13′15″W	Estancia of Mission San Gabriel Arcángel. The reconstructed buildings serve as a museum.
Santa Ana Estancia		1817	Costa Mesa; 33°40′23″N 117°56′13″W	Also known as the Costa Mesa Estancia. Estancia of Mission San Juan Capistrano. The Diego Sepúlveda Adobe serves as a museum.
Las Flores Estancia		1823	Camp Pendleton; 33°17′59″N 117°27′39″W	Estancia of Mission San Luis Rey de Francia. The building is part of a Boy Scout camp.

=== Presidios ===
Presidios in chronological order:

- El Presidio Real de San Diego (Presidio of San Diego), founded July 16, 1769
- El Presidio Real de San Carlos de Monterey (Presidio of Monterey, California), founded June 3, 1770
- El Presidio Real de San Francisco (Presidio of San Francisco), founded December 17, 1776
- El Presidio Real de Santa Bárbara (Presidio of Santa Barbara), founded April 12, 1782
- El Presidio de Sonoma (Sonoma Barracks), founded 1810

== See also ==
- Bibliography of California history

On Spanish Missions:

- Spanish missions in Arizona
- Spanish missions in Baja California
- Spanish missions in the Sonoran Desert (including Sonora and southern Arizona)

On California history:

- Juan Bautista de Anza National Historic Trail
- History of California through 1899
- History of the west coast of North America
- Mission Vieja

On general missionary history:

- Catholic Church and the Age of Discovery
- History of Christian Missions
- List of the oldest churches in Mexico
- Missionary

On colonial Spanish American history:

- Spanish colonization of the Americas
- California mission clash of cultures
- Indian Reductions
- California Genocide
- Native Americans in the United States
