= USNS Mission San Diego =

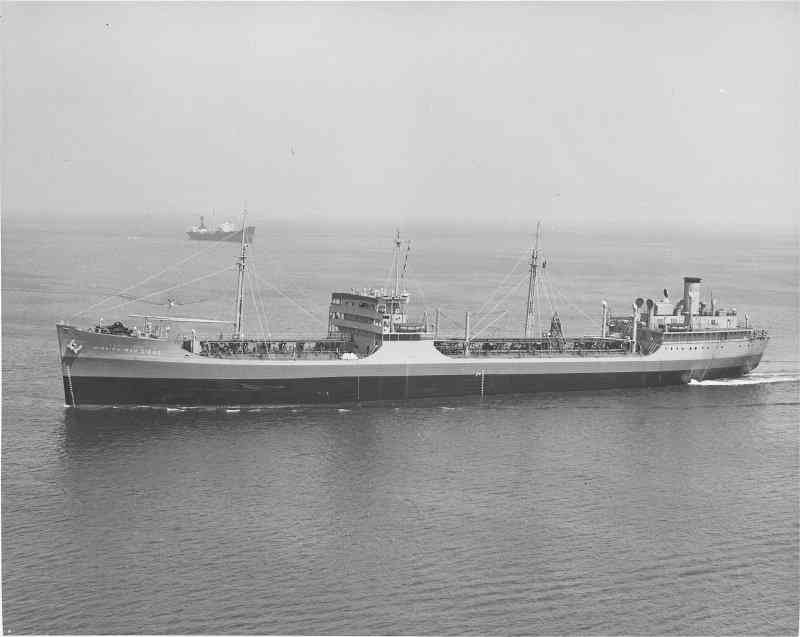

History

United States
- Builder: Marinship Corporation, Sausalito, California
- Laid down: 20 December 1943
- Launched: 14 March 1944
- Acquired: 30 April 1944
- Stricken: 16 October 1957
- Identification: IMO number: 6704488
- Fate: Scrapped 2001

General characteristics
- Class & type: Mission Buenaventura-class oiler
- Displacement: 5,532 long tons (5,621 t) light; 21,880 long tons (22,231 t) full
- Length: 524 ft (160 m)
- Beam: 68 ft (21 m)
- Draft: 30 ft (9.1 m)
- Propulsion: Turbo-electric, single screw, 6,000 hp (4.47 MW)
- Speed: 16.5 knots (30.6 km/h; 19.0 mph)
- Complement: 52
- Armament: None

SS Mission San Diego was a Type T2-SE-A2 tanker built for the United States Maritime Commission during World War II. After the war she was acquired by the United States Navy as USS Mission San Diego (AO-121) and later transferred to the Military Sea Transportation Service as USNS Mission San Diego (T-AO-121). She was a member of the Mission Buenaventura-class oiler and was named for Mission San Diego de Alcalá.

== Career ==
Laid down as SS Mission San Diego on 20 December 1943, as a Maritime Commission type (T2-SE-A2) tanker hull under Maritime Commission contract (MC hull 1814) by Marine Ship Corporation, Sausalito, California, she was launched on 14 March 1944, sponsored by Mrs. E. J. Rising; and delivered on 30 April 1944.

Chartered to Deconhill Shipping Co. upon delivery for operations, she spent the remainder of the war carrying fuel to allied forces overseas in the Pacific (during which time she was awarded the National Defense Service Medal). She was returned to the Maritime Commission on 29 March 1946 and laid up in the Maritime Reserve Fleet at Suisun Bay, California.

Acquired by the Navy on 17 October 1947 she was designated Mission San Diego (AO‑121) and placed under the operational control of the Naval Transportation Service. After 1 October 1949 she was transferred to the newly created Military Sea Transportation Service (MSTS) for duty as USNS Mission San Diego (T‑AO‑121). She served with MSTS until 30 December 1954 when she was returned to the Maritime Administration (MARAD) and laid up in the Maritime Reserve Fleet at Olympia, Washington. She was struck from the Naval Vessel Register on 22 June 1955. Reacquired by the Navy on 3 July 1956 she was placed in service with MSTS, but served only until 16 October 1957 when she was returned to MARAD and laid up in the Maritime Reserve Fleet at James River, Virginia. She was again struck from the Naval Vessel Register that same date.

The ship was sold to the Hudson Waterways Corporation on 10 November 1966, and renamed Seatrain Washington. She was subsequently lengthened using sections of two other T2 tankers, the Tomahawk and Mission San Jose, and rebuilt by Maryland Shipbuilding and Drydock Company into one of seven Seatrain Lines multi-purpose cargo ships capable of carrying general bulk and palletized cargo, intermodal containers, vehicles and rail cars. Upon completion of the conversion and delivery in 1967 Seatrain Washington, IMO 6704488, was chartered to the MSTS in support of overseas U.S. military operations, including the transport of material, equipment and aircraft to Vietnam. The ship was transferred to the National Defense Reserve Fleet (James River) in August 1975 and on 27 May 1977, her name was changed to just Washington. The ship was retired and broken up in 2001.
