= USNS Mission Solano =

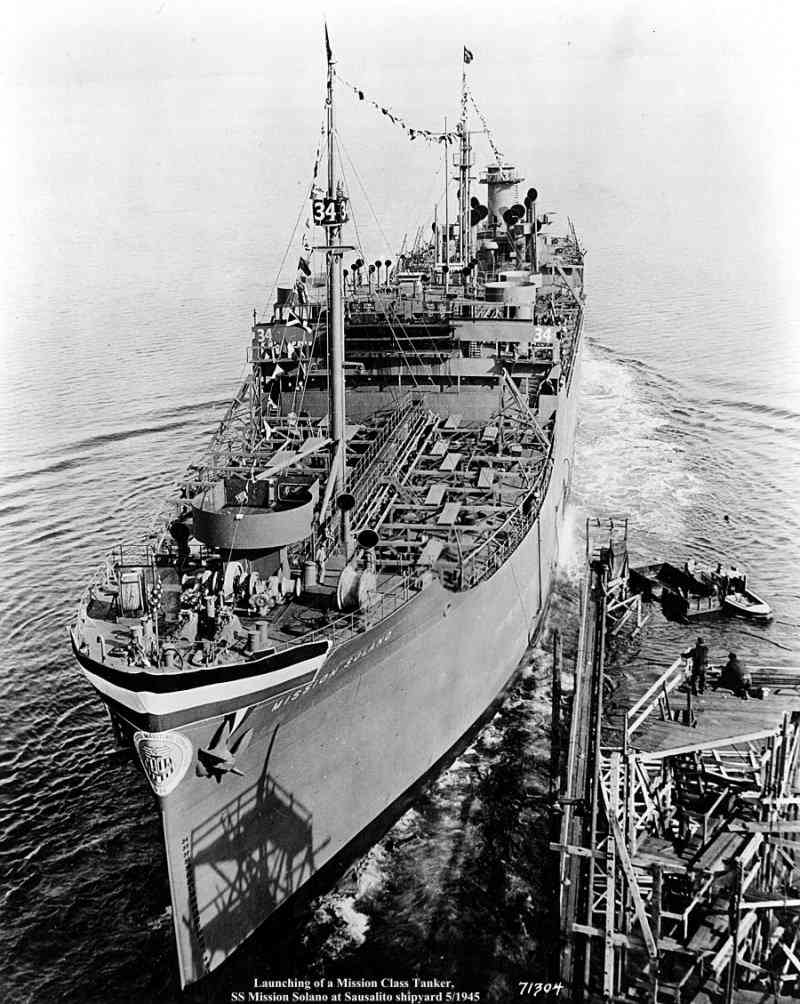
- SS Mission Solano launching at Marine Ship Corporation, Sausalito, California on 14 January 1944

History

United States
- Name: Mission Solano
- Builder: Marinship Corporation, Sausalito, California
- Laid down: 8 October 1943
- Launched: 14 January 1944
- Acquired: 30 March 1944
- Stricken: 15 August 1957
- Identification: IMO number: 6826884
- Fate: Scrapped March 1984

General characteristics
- Class & type: Mission Buenaventura-class oiler
- Displacement: 5,532 long tons (5,621 t) light; 21,880 long tons (22,231 t) full
- Length: 524 ft (160 m)
- Beam: 68 ft (21 m)
- Draft: 30 ft (9.1 m)
- Propulsion: Turbo-electric, single screw, 6,000 hp (4.47 MW)
- Speed: 16.5 knots (30.6 km/h; 19.0 mph)
- Complement: 52
- Armament: None

SS Mission Solano was a Type T2-SE-A2 tanker built for the United States Maritime Commission during World War II. After the war she was acquired by the United States Navy as USS Mission Solano (AO-135). Later the tanker transferred to the Military Sea Transportation Service as USNS Mission Solano (T-AO-135). A Mission Buenaventura-class oiler, she was named for Mission San Francisco Solano, she was the only U.S. Naval vessel to bear the name.

== Career ==
Originally laid down as SS Mission Solano on 8 October 1943 as a Maritime Commission type (T2-SE-A2) tanker hull under Maritime Commission contract (MC hull 1277) by Marine Ship Corporation, Sausalito, California; launched on 14 January 1944; sponsored by Mrs. William B. Hawke and delivered on 30 March 1944.

Chartered to Deconhill Shipping Company for operations, she spent the remainder of the war carrying fuel to US forces in the western Pacific. She remained in this capacity until 29 April 1946 when she was returned to the Maritime Commission and laid up in the Maritime Reserve Fleet at Olympia, Washington.

Acquired by the Navy on 20 October 1947 she was chartered to the Pacific-Atlantic Steamship Company for operations and placed under the operational control of the Naval Transportation Service as Mission Solano (AO-135). When the newly created Military Sea Transportation Service took over operational control on 1 October 1949 she was redesignated USNS Mission Solano (T-AO-135). She served with MSTS until 15 August 1957 when she was returned to the Maritime Administration and laid up in the Maritime Reserve Fleet at Olympia. She was struck from the Naval Vessel Register on the same date.

Sold to Sea-Land Service, Inc. on 26 May 1967 she was converted into a container ship. She was renamed SS Jacksonville on 27 December 1967. Resold to Madison Transportation Company on 19 June 1968, the ship was scrapped in March 1984.

== Awards ==
During her active military service she was awarded the National Defense Service Medal, the Korean Service Medal, the United Nations Service Medal and the Republic of Korea War Service Medal (retroactively). She also received a Battle Star for her Korean War service.
