= USNS Mission San Juan =

United States ship (1943–1984)

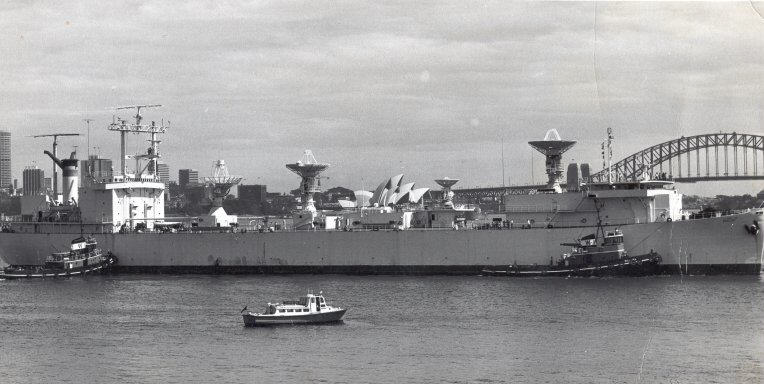
- USNS Mercury

History

United States
- Name: Mission San Juan
- Builder: Marinship Corporation, Sausalito, California
- Laid down: 30 July 1943
- Launched: 14 October 1943
- Commissioned: 31 January 1944
- Identification: IMO number: 7304261
- Fate: Sold 23 June 1970; Scrapped 25 June 1984

General characteristics
- Class & type: Mission Buenaventura-class oiler
- Displacement: 5,532 long tons (5,621 t) light; 21,880 long tons (22,231 t) full
- Length: 523 ft 6 in (159.56 m)
- Beam: 68 ft (21 m)
- Draft: 30 ft (9.1 m)
- Propulsion: Turbo-electric, single screw, 6,000 hp (4.47 MW)
- Speed: 14 knots (26 km/h; 16 mph)
- Complement: 42 mariners; 17 Navy Armed Guard
- Armament: 1 × single 5"/38 caliber gun; 4 × single 3"/50 caliber guns; 4 × twin 40 mm AA guns; 4 × twin 20 mm AA guns

SS Mission San Juan was a Type T2-SE-A2 tanker built for the United States Maritime Commission during World War II. After the war she was acquired by the United States Navy as USS Mission San Juan. Later the tanker transferred to the Military Sea Transportation Service as USNS Mission San Juan. She was a member of the Mission Buenaventura-class oiler and was named for Mission San Juan Bautista in San Juan Bautista, California.

== Service history ==
=== As oiler, 1943–1958 ===
Mission San Juan was laid down on 30 July 1943 under a Maritime Commission contract by Marine Ship Corporation, Sausalito, California; launched on 14 October 1943, sponsored by Mrs. Derrill D. Standifird; and delivered to the Maritime Commission on 31 January 1944 upon completion. Chartered to Deconhill Shipping Company in February, 1944 the tanker spent the remainder of the war supplying fuel oil to American and Allied Forces overseas, during which time she was awarded the National Defense Service Medal.

Shortly after the cessation of hostilities, Mission San Juan was placed in the Maritime Commission Reserve Fleet at Mobile, Alabama on 9 April 1946. Acquired by the Navy on 21 November 1947 she was retransferred to the Naval Transportation Service the same date. Designated as Mission San Juan (AO-126), she served as such until 1 October 1949 when the newly formed Military Sea Transportation Service took over the functions and ships of the Naval and Army Transportation Services. Acquired by MSTS on 1 October, she was designated USNS Mission San Juan (T-AO-126) and was placed in service with a civilian crew. During the Korean War, she carried fuel to the forward operating bases and continued in this duty until after the war, until 12 February 1958 when she was placed out of service by MSTS, stricken from the Naval Vessel Register and transferred on the same date to the Maritime Administration and laid up in the Reserve Fleet at Beaumont, Texas.

=== As tracking ship, 1964–1970 ===
Reacquired by the Navy on 28 October 1964, Mission San Juan was moved to the General Dynamics Shipyard, Quincy, Massachusetts, for conversion into a missile range instrumentation ship. During this conversion, she was jumboized by fitting a new 72-foot section amidships and virtually rebuilt in order to accommodate the required electronic equipment. Renamed Flagstaff and designated AGM-21 on 8 April 1965, she was again renamed, on 1 September 1965, to Mercury.

Upon completion of this she was reassigned to MSTS, Atlantic, but shortly thereafter was reassigned to MSTS, Pacific. There she was to play an important part in the Project Apollo moon shot tests as she provided important communication links between the Apollo moon craft and earth tracking stations.The ship supported Apollo 7 through Apollo 11. The technical crew wete from ITT Federal Electric Corp. The company was under contract to the USAF at the Western Test Range.

=== As bulk-carrier, 1970–1984 ===
The ship was sold on 23 June 1970 to Matson Navigation Co. for conversion to a bulk-carrier at the Willamette Iron and Steel Works, Portland, Oregon, and renamed SS Kopaa. Sold in February 1981 to California & Hawaii Sugar Co., she was scrapped in Taiwan on 25 June 1984.
