= Mission Buenaventura-class oiler =

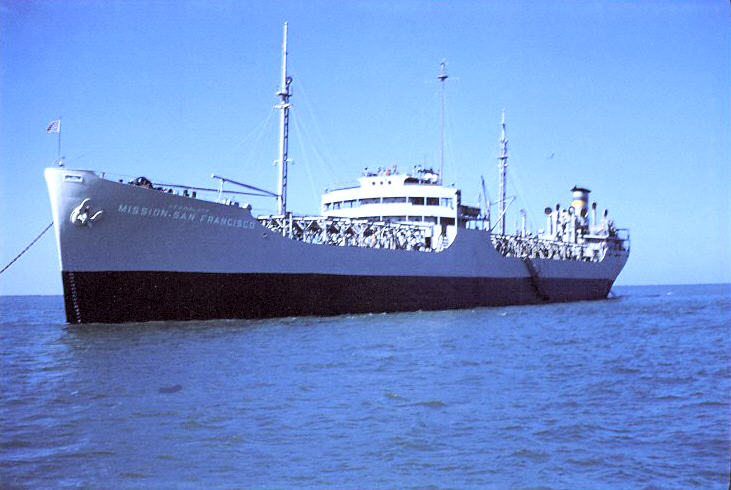
- USNS Mission San Francisco

Class overview
- Name: Mission Buenaventura class
- Builders: Marinship
- Operators: United States Navy
- Preceded by: Shikellamy class
- Succeeded by: Neosho class
- Built: 1943–1945
- In commission: 1944–1980
- Completed: 27
- Retired: 27

General characteristics
- Type: Type T2-SE-A2 tanker
- Displacement: 5,532 short tons (5,019 t) (light); 21,800 short tons (19,777 t) (full)
- Length: 524 ft (160 m)
- Beam: 68 ft (21 m)
- Draft: 30 ft (9.1 m)
- Propulsion: Turbo-electric; 10,000 hp (7,457 kW); Single screw
- Speed: 16.5 knots (30.6 km/h; 19.0 mph)
- Complement: 52

The Mission Buenaventura class was a series of oilers in World War II in service with the United States Navy. Each of the ships was named after a mission or settlement along the El Camino Real in California, the sole exception being Mission Loreto, named for a settlement in Baja California Sur. When Mission Santa Ynez was scrapped in 2010 she was the last of the over 500 T2 tankers built during the war.

== Ships ==
- Mission Buenaventura (T-AO-111)
- Mission Capistrano (T-AO-112)
- Mission Carmel (T-AO-113)
- Mission De Pala (T-AO-114)
- Mission Dolores (T-AO-115)
- Mission Loreto (T-AO-116)
- Mission Los Angeles (T-AO-117)
- Mission Purisima (T-AO-118)
- Mission San Antonio (T-AO-119)
- Mission San Carlos (T-AO-120)
- Mission San Diego (T-AO-121)
- Mission San Fernando (T-AO-122)
- Mission San Francisco (T-AO-123)
- Mission San Gabriel (T-AO-124)
- Mission San Jose (T-AO-125)
- Mission San Juan (T-AO-126)
- Mission San Luis Obispo (T-AO-127)
- Mission San Luis Rey (T-AO-128)
- Mission San Miguel (T-AO-129)
- Mission San Rafael (T-AO-130)
- Mission Santa Barbara (T-AO-131)
- Mission Santa Clara (T-AO-132)
- Mission Santa Cruz (T-AO-133)
- Mission Santa Ynez (T-AO-134)
- Mission Solano (T-AO-135)
- Mission Soledad (T-AO-136)
- Mission Santa Ana (T-AO-137)
