= USNS Mission Los Angeles =

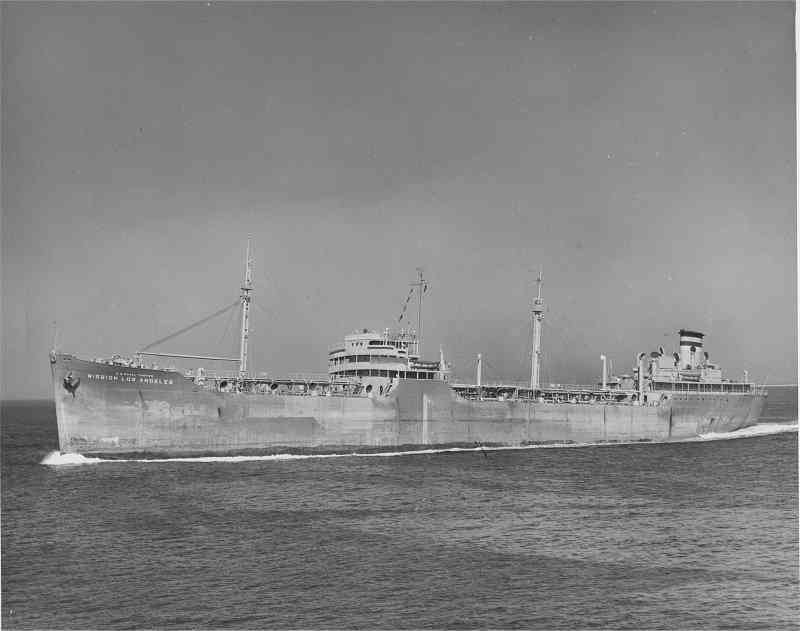
- USNS Mission Los Angeles (T-AO-117) underway off Long Beach, California, date unknown

History

United States
- Name: Mission Los Angeles
- Builder: Marinship Corporation, Sausalito, California
- Laid down: 25 April 1945, as Conecuh
- Launched: 10 August 1945, as Mission Los Angeles
- In service: 29 October 1945
- Out of service: 16 July 1946
- In service: 24 October 1947
- Out of service: 12 November 1957
- Stricken: 12 November 1957
- Identification: IMO number: 6912205
- Honors and awards: 2 battle stars (Korea)
- Fate: Scrapped December 1975

General characteristics
- Class & type: Mission Buenaventura-class oiler
- Displacement: 5,532 long tons (5,621 t) light; 21,880 long tons (22,231 t) full
- Length: 524 ft (160 m)
- Beam: 68 ft (21 m)
- Draft: 30 ft (9.1 m)
- Propulsion: Turbo-electric, single screw
- Speed: 16.5 knots (30.6 km/h; 19.0 mph)
- Complement: 52
- Armament: None

USNS Mission Los Angeles (T-AO-117) was a Mission Buenaventura-class oiler that served in the United States Navy. The ship was originally intended as USS Conecuh (AO-103) for the U.S. Navy but her acquisition was canceled. The ship, a Type T2-SE-A3 tanker, was completed as SS Mission Los Angeles and delivered after the end of World War II. The tanker was acquired by the U.S. Navy in 1948 as USS Mission Los Angeles (AO-117), but was transferred to the Military Sea Transport Service upon its creation in 1949. The ship was named for Nuestra Señora Reina de los Angeles Asistencia (a "sub-mission" to Mission San Gabriel Arcángel, one of the twenty-one California missions), she was the only U.S. Naval Vessel to bear the name.

== Service history ==
=== 1945–1946 ===
Conecuh was laid down on 25 April 1945 as a type T2-SE-A3 tanker under a Maritime Commission contract by the Marinship Corporation of Sausalito, California, but launched as Mission Los Angeles on 10 August 1945, sponsored by Mrs. Daniel J. Johnston. The ship was delivered on 29 October 1945. Operated by Los Angeles Tanker Operators, Inc. under charter, her period of service was short, for on 16 July 1946 she was returned to the Maritime Commission and laid up in the Maritime Reserve Fleet at Beaumont, Texas.

=== 1947–1957 ===
Acquired by the Navy on 24 October 1947 she was placed in service with the Naval Transportation Service as Mission Los Angeles (AO-117). Absorbed into the new Military Sea Transportation Service (MSTS) on 1 October 1949 she was designated USNS Mission Los Angeles (T-AO-117) and continued her services in support of the fleet until 12 November 1957 when she was struck from the Naval Vessel Registers and returned to the Maritime Administration to be laid up in the Maritime Reserve Fleet at Beaumont.

The ship was scrapped in December 1975.

== Awards ==
During her active military service she was awarded the National Defense Service Medal, the Korean Service Medal (twice), the United Nations Service Medal and the Republic of Korea War Service Medal (retroactively). She also received two Battle Stars for her Korean War service.
