= USNS Mission Buenaventura =

U.S. Navy tanker ship

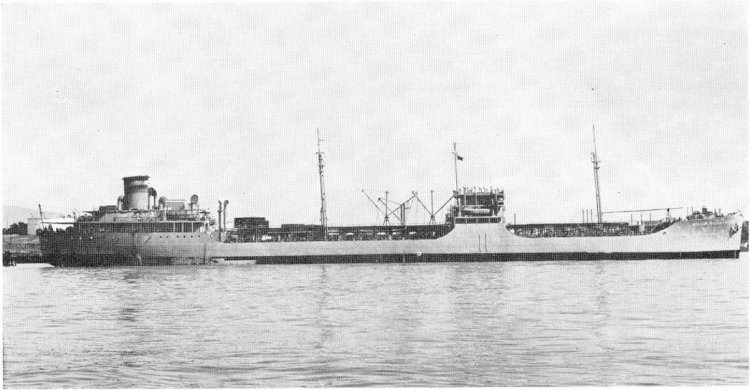
- USNS Mission Buenaventura

History

United States
- Name: SS Mission Buenaventura
- Namesake: Mission San Buenaventura in Ventura, California
- Owner: WSA
- Operator: Deconhill Shipping Company
- Builder: Marinship Corporation
- Laid down: 29 March 1944
- Launched: 28 May 1944
- In service: 28 June 1944
- Out of service: March 1946
- Acquired: by U.S. Navy Naval Transportation Service, 18 November 1947, as USNS Mission Buenaventura
- In service: 18 November 1947
- Reclassified: AO-111, 18 November 1947
- Out of service: 4 April 1960
- Reclassified: T-AO-111, 1 October 1949
- Stricken: 31 March 1972
- Fate: Sold for scrapping

General characteristics
- Displacement: 5,532 short tons (5,019 t) light; 21,880 short tons (19,850 t) full
- Length: 523 ft 6 in (159.56 m)
- Draft: 29 ft 11 in (9.12 m)
- Speed: 16.5
- Complement: 52 mariners

SS Mission Buenaventura was a Type T2-SE-A2 tanker built for the United States Maritime Commission during World War II. After the war she was acquired by the United States Navy as USS Mission Buenaventura (AO-111). Later the tanker transferred to the Military Sea Transportation Service as USNS Mission Buenaventura (T-AO-111). The lead ship in her class of fleet oilers, she was named for Mission San Buenaventura located in Ventura, California.

== Operational history ==
SS Mission Buenaventura was laid down 29 March 1944 under a Maritime Commission contract by Marinship Corporation, Sausalito, California; launched 28 May 1944; sponsored by Mrs. Fred W. Boole; and delivered 28 June 1944. Chartered to Deconhill Shipping Company, for operations, she spent the remainder of the War supporting the victorious Allied forces in the Pacific. She was returned to the Maritime Commission in March 1946 and on 30 March was laid up in the Maritime Commission Reserve Fleet at Mobile, Alabama.

Acquired by the Navy on 18 November 1947 she was activated and transferred to the Naval Transportation Service for service as Mission Buenaventura (AO‑111). When the Naval Transportation Service was absorbed by the new Military Sea Transportation Service, she continued her duties as USNS Mission Buenaventura (T‑AO‑111). She continued her worldwide service until 4 April 1960 when she was transferred to the Maritime Commission for layup at Mobile. Reacquired by the Navy on 10 November 1961 she was transferred to MSTS control on the same date and chartered to Mathiasen's Tanker Industries, Inc. for operations, where she served as part of the Ready Reserve Force fleet.

She was taken out of service and struck from the Naval Vessel Register on 31 March 1972. Final disposition, disposed of for scrap by MARAD sale 26 June 1978.
