= India–Pakistan naval war of 1971 =

Overview of naval operations during the India–Pakistan war of 1971

- Part of the Bangladesh Liberation War and India–Pakistan war of 1971
Date	2–16 December 1971
Location	Indian Ocean: Bay of Bengal (Eastern Front); Arabian Sea (Western Front)
Result	Indian victory: Surrender of the Pakistani Eastern Armed Forces Command; Eastern Front: Pakistan Naval fleet in East is destroyed; Total blockade; Western Front: Significant damage to Karachi Harbour; Partial blockade
Territorial changes	Eastern front: Secession of East Pakistan from Pakistan as the independent People's Republic of Bangladesh; Western front: Territory captured in Kashmir retained by both sides, Line of Control defined; All other captured territory returned to India and Pakistan

Belligerents
Pakistan	India

Commanders and leaders
Muzaffar Hassan; Rashid Ahmed; Moh'd Shariff; Leslie Mungavin; Patrick J. Simpson; M. A. K. Lodhi; David Felix	S. M. Nanda; Sourendra Nath Kohli; Nilakanta Krishnan; V. A. Kamath; Chandy Kuruvila; S. H. Sarma

Units involved
Pakistan Navy	Indian Navy

Strength
1 light cruiser 5 destroyers 2 frigates 4 submarines (3 Daphné class and 1 Tench class); 6 midget submarines 8 minesweepers 1 fleet tanker Two ex Royal Saudi Navy Jaguar-class fast attack craft At least 1 Indonesian naval vessel US 7th Fleet	1 light aircraft carrier 2 light cruisers 4 submarines (4 Kalvari class); 3 destroyers 14 frigates 5 ASW frigates 6 missile boats 2 tankers 1 repair ship 2 landing ships 2 groups of Soviet cruisers and destroyers 1 Soviet submarine 1 Soviet nuclear submarine

Casualties and losses
450 killed in action †; 1,413 captured (POW): 2 destroyers (PNS Khaibar and PNS Shah Jahan) 1 minesweeper; 1 frigate (damaged beyond repair and later scrapped by friendly fire from aircraft of the Pakistan Air Force); 1 submarine; 3 Merchant Navy ships captured 10 small vessels captured: Widespread damage to Chittagong Harbour; Pakistani main port Karachi facilities damaged/fuel tanks destroyed	194 killed in action †; 1 frigate (INS Khukri); 1 aircraft (Alizé 203); 2 gunboats: Okha harbour damaged/fuel tanks destroyed.

The India–Pakistan naval war of 1971 refers to the maritime military engagements between the Indian Navy and the Pakistan Navy during the Indo-Pakistani War of 1971. The series of naval operations began with the Indian Navy's exertion of pressure on Pakistan from the Indian Ocean, while the Indian Army and Indian Air Force moved in to choke Pakistani forces operating in East Pakistan on land. Indian naval operations comprised naval interdiction, air defence, ground support, and logistics missions.

== Background ==
The Indian Navy did not play a major role during the Indo-Pakistani War of 1965 as the war focused on land-based conflict. On 7 September, a flotilla of the Pakistan Navy under the command of Commodore S.M. Anwar carried out a bombardment, Operation Dwarka, of the Indian Navy's radar station of Dwarka, 200 miles (320 km) south of the Pakistani port of Karachi. While there was no damage to the radar station, this operation caused the Indian Navy to undergo a rapid modernization and expansion. Consequently, the Indian Navy budget grew from ₹ 350 million to ₹ 1.15 billion. The Indian Navy added a squadron to its combatant fleet by acquiring six Osa-class missile boats from the Soviet Union. The Indian Naval Air Arm was also strengthened.

=== Pakistani Navy in East Pakistan ===
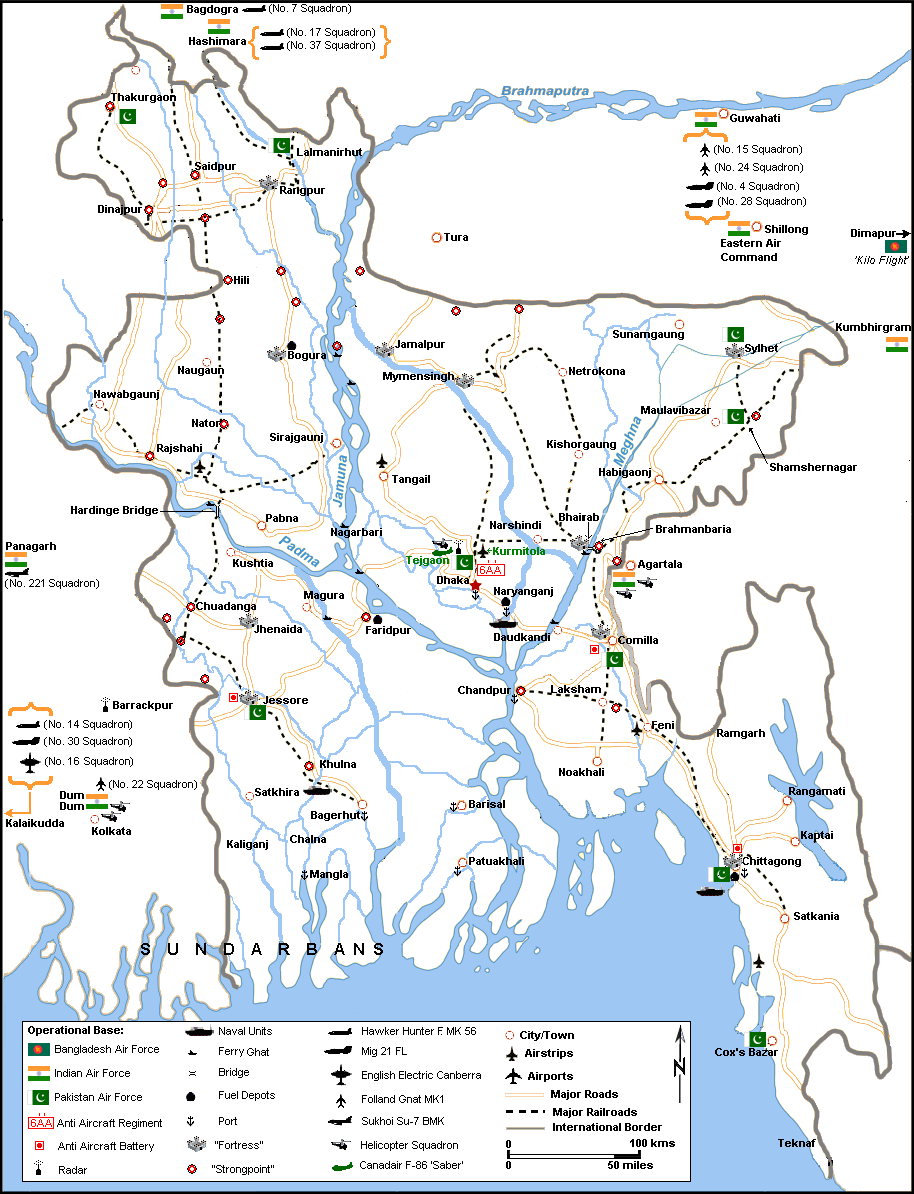
Locations of Pakistan Navy's Combatant forces in December 1971 in and around East Pakistan. Some unit locations are not shown. Map not to exact scale.

The Eastern Command was established in 1969 and Rear-Admiral Mohammad Shariff (later four-star Admiral) was made naval commander in that region. Admiral Shariff administratively ran the Navy, and was credited for leading the administrative operations. Under his command, SSG(N), Pakistan Marines and SEAL teams were established, running both covert and overt operations in the Eastern Command and were assumed command by Commander David R. Felix.During the conflict, East Pakistan's naval ports were left defenceless as the Eastern Command of Pakistan had decided to fight the war without the navy. Faced with overwhelming opposition, the navy planned to remain in the ports when war broke out.

The Pakistan Naval Forces had inadequate ships to challenge the Indian Navy on both fronts, and the Pakistan Air Force (PAF) was unable to protect these ships from the Indian Air Force (IAF) and Indian Naval Air Arm. Furthermore, Chief of Naval Staff of Pakistan Navy, Vice-Admiral Muzaffar Hassan, had ordered the navy to deploy all naval power on the Western Front. Most of the Pakistan Navy's combatant vessels were deployed in West Pakistan and only one destroyer, PNS Sylhet, was assigned in East Pakistan, on the personal request of Admiral Shariff. faced with a hopeless task against overwhelming odds, the Navy planned to remain in port when war broke out.

In the eastern wing, the Pakistan Navy heavily depended on her gun boat squadron. The Pakistan's Eastern Naval Command was in direct command of Flag Officer Commanding (FOC) Rear-Admiral Mohammad Shariff who also served as the right-hand of Lieutenant-General Niazi. The Pakistan Navy had four gunboats (PNS Jessore, Rajshahi, Comilla, and Sylhet). All were 345 ton vessels, capable of attaining a maximum speed of 20 knots, crewed by 29 sailors, and fitted with 40/60 mm. cannons and machine guns.One additional patrol boat (PNS Balaghat) and 17 armed boats (armed with 12.7mm./20mm. guns and/or .50 or .303 Browning machine guns) were also employed, in addition to numerous civilian-owned boats requisitioned and armed with various weapons by Pakistani forces, were also part of the Pakistani naval contingent.

This flotilla of improvised armed boats were adequate for patrolling and anti-insurgency operations, but hopelessly out of place in conventional warfare. Before the start of hostilities in December, PNS Jessore was in Khulna with 4 other boats, PNS Rajshahi, PNS Comilla, and PNS Balaghat were at Chittagong, and PNS Sylhet was undergoing repairs at a dry-dock near Dhaka. The outbreak of hostilities on 3 December found most of these boats scattered around the province.

== Commencement of naval hostilities ==
On 4 December, three Indian Navy missile boats, equipped with P-15 Termit anti-ship missiles, launched Operation Trident against the port of Karachi. In 1971, Karachi not only housed the headquarters of the Pakistan Navy but was also the backbone of Pakistan's economy, as it served as the hub of Pakistan's maritime trade, meaning that any potential blockade of Karachi would be disastrous for Pakistan's economy. The defence of Karachi harbour was therefore paramount to the Pakistani High Command and it was heavily defended against any airstrikes or naval strikes. The Pakistani Navy had launched submarine operations to gather intelligence on Indian naval efforts. Even so, with multiple intelligence reports by the submarines, the Navy had failed to divert the naval attacks, due to misleading intelligence and communications.

The Indian Navy's preemptive strike resulted in an ultimate success. The Indian missile vessels, of the 25th missile boat squadron, successfully sunk the minesweeper PNS Muhafiz, the destroyer PNS Khaibar and MV Venus Challenger which, according to Indian sources, was carrying ammunition for Pakistan from the United States forces in Saigon. The destroyer PNS Shah Jahan was damaged beyond repair. The missile ships also bombed the Kemari oil storage tanks of the port which were burnt and destroyed causing massive loss to the Karachi Harbour. Operation Trident was an enormous success with no physical damage to any of the ships in the Indian task group, which returned safely to their garrison.

Pakistan's Airforce retaliated by bombing Okha harbour, scoring direct hits on fuelling facilities for missile boats, ammunition dump and the missile boats jetty. Though India had anticipated this assault and moved their missile boats to other locations prior thus preventing any losses, the destruction of the special fuel tank prevented any further incursions until Operation Python. On the way back from the bombing the PAF aircraft encountered an Alizé 203 Indian aircraft and shot it down.

== Naval operations in the Eastern theatre ==
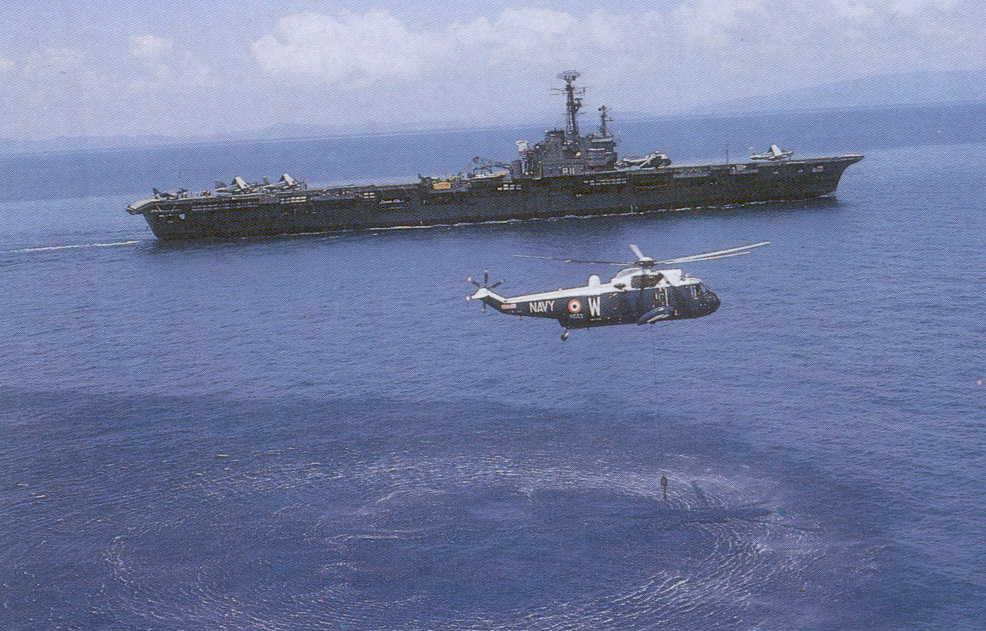
Indian carrier Vikrant played a key role in enforcing a naval blockade over East Pakistan

On 4 December 1971, the aircraft carrier Vikrant was also deployed and its Hawker Sea Hawk attack aircraft contributed to Air Operations in East Pakistan. The aircraft successfully attacked many coastal towns in East Pakistan including Chittagong and Cox's Bazar. The continuous attacks later destroyed the PAF's capability to retaliate.

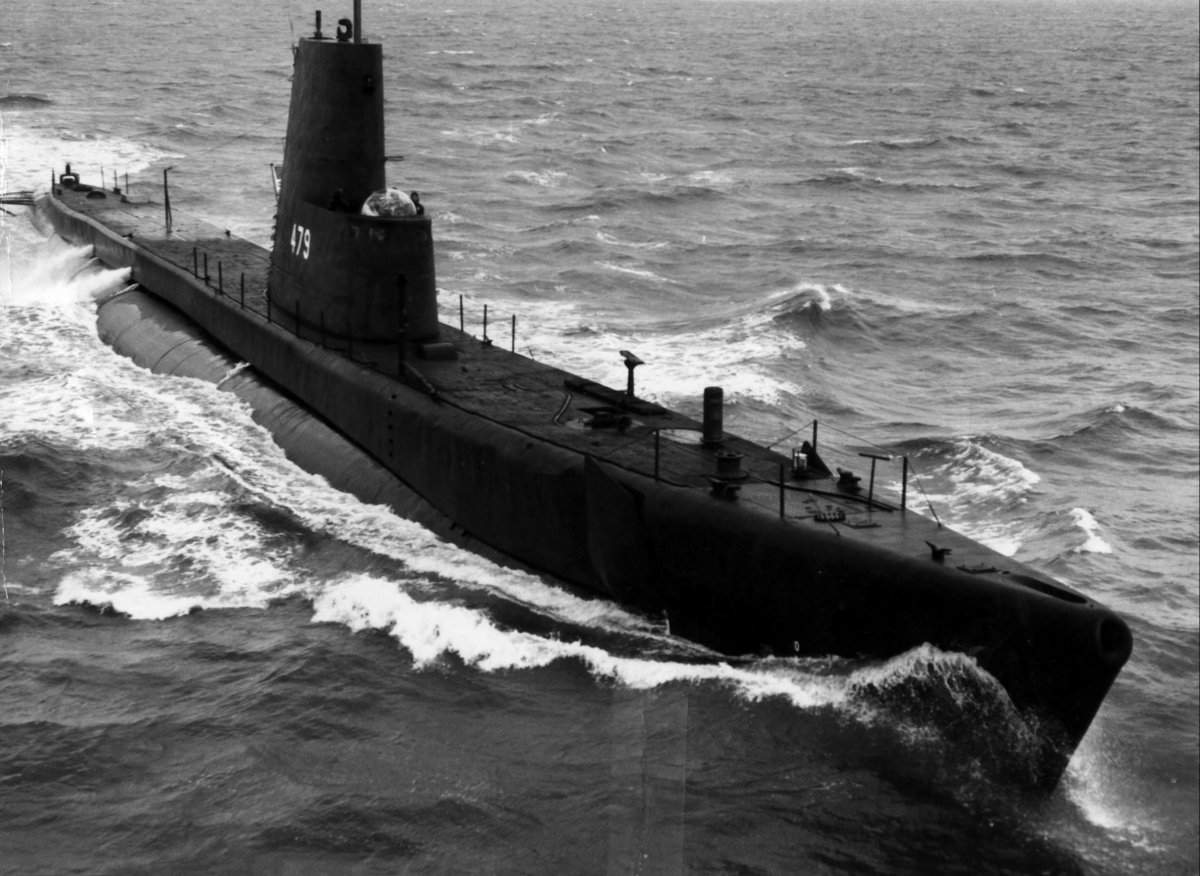
Pakistan's Ghazi was the only long range submarine used during the conflict

The Pakistan Navy responded by deploying her ageing long-range submarine, PNS Ghazi, to counter the threat as the Naval Command had overruled the objections by her officers. Ghazi, under the command of Commander Zafar Muhammad Khan, was assigned to locate Vikrant, but when it was not able to locate, decided to mine the port of Visakhapatnam – the headquarters of Eastern Naval Command. The Indian Navy's Naval Intelligence laid a trap to sink the submarine by giving fake reports about the aircraft carrier. At around midnight of 3–4 December, Ghazi began its operation of laying mines. The Indian Navy dispatched INS Rajput to counter the threat.

Rajput's sonar radar reported the disturbance underwater and two depth charges were released. The deadly game ended when the submarine sank mysteriously while laying a mine with all 92 hands on board around midnight on 3 December 1971 off the Visakhapatnam coast.The sinking of Ghazi turned out to be a major blow and setback for Pakistani naval operations in East Pakistan.

On 5/6 December 1971, naval air operations were carried out Chittagong, Khulna, and Mangla harbours, and at ships in the Pussur river. The oil installations were destroyed at Chittagong, and the Greek merchant ship Thetic Charlie was sunk at the outer anchorage. On 7/8 December, the airfields of PAF were destroyed, and the campaign continued until 9 December. On 12 December, Pakistan Navy laid naval mines on amphibious landing approaches to Chittagong. This proved a useful trap for some time, and it had denied any direct access to Chittagong port for a long time, even after the instrument of surrender had been signed. The Indian Navy therefore decided to carry out an amphibious landing at Cox's Bazar with the aim cutting off the line of retreat for Pakistan Army troops. On 12 December, an additional amphibious battalion was aboard INS Vishwa Vijaya was sailed from Calcutta port. On the night of 15/16 December, the amphibious landing was carried out, immediately after IAF bombardment of the beach a day earlier. After fighting for days, the human cost was very high for Pakistani forces, and no opposition or resistance was offered by Pakistani forces to Indian forces. During this episode Eastern theatre Indian forces suffered only 2 deaths in the operation. Meanwhile, Pakistani forces were reported to have suffered hundreds of deaths. By the dawn of 17 December, the Indian Navy was free to operate at will in the Bay of Bengal.

=== Elimination of gunboat threats ===
Indian carrier-borne aircraft attacked the Rajshahi and Comilla near Chittagong on 4 December, with the Rajshahi damaged and the Comilla sunk. The Balaghat, which was not attacked, rescued the Comilla crew and returned to Chittagong with the surviving ships. On 5 December, Indian planes sank two patrol boats in Khulna. The PNS Sylhet was destroyed on 6 December and the Balaghat on 9 December by Indian aircraft.

The 39th Division (under General Rahim Khan) Headquarters at Chandpur had requested evacuation by river on 8 December. Under the escort of a gunboat, the flotilla, made up of local launches, sailed in the early hours of 10 December. The IAF spotted and bombed the ships, and PNS Jessore, which had withdrawn from Khulna to Dhaka, was destroyed escorting boats evacuating Pakistani troops from Chandpur while other boats were either sunk or beached themselves and failed to reach Dhaka. The survivors later were evacuated by ships and helicopters operating at night. PNS Rajshahi was repaired, and under the command of Lt. Commander Sikander Hayat, managed to evade the Indian blockade and reach Malaysia before the surrender on 16 December. From there, it sailed to Karachi and continued to serve in the Pakistan navy.

== Sinking of INS Khukri ==
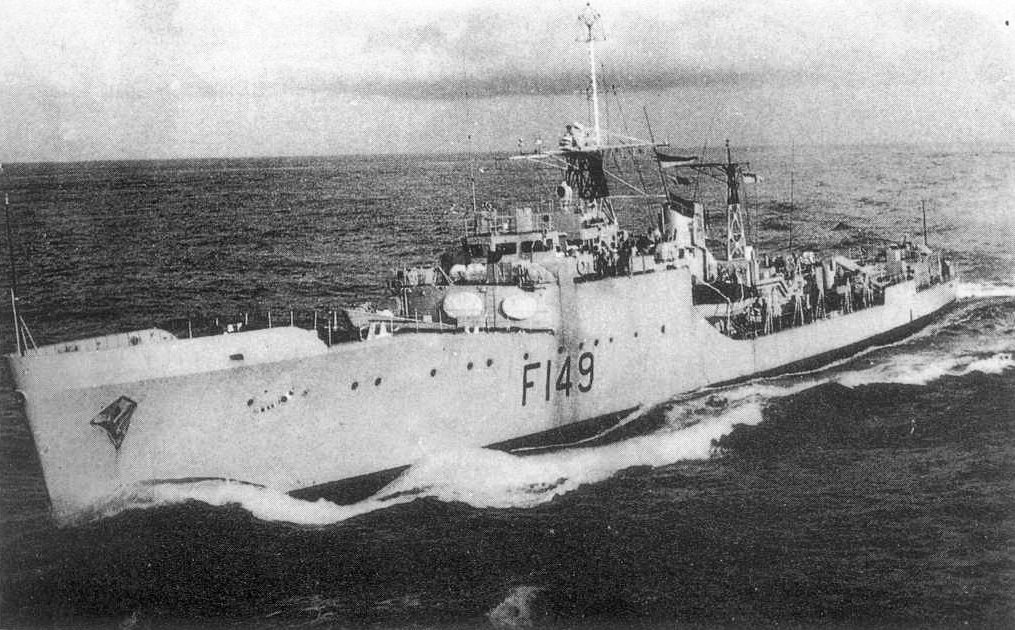
INS Khukri

As the Indian military offensive in East Pakistan increased, the Pakistan Navy had dispatched her entire submarine squadron on both fronts. Codename "Operation Falcon", the Pakistan Navy began their reconnaissance submarine operations by deploying PNS Hangor, a Daphné-class submarine, near the coastal water of West-Pakistan, and PNS Ghazi, a Tench-class long range submarine, near the coastal areas of East-Pakistan.

The Pakistan Navy submarine PNS Hangor sank the Indian ASW frigate INS Khukri.

According to the Lieutenant R. Qadri, an electrical engineer officer aboard Hangor during the time, the assigned mission was considered quite difficult and highly dangerous, with the submarine squadron sailing under the assumption that the dangerous nature of this mission meant a great mortal risk to the submarine and her crew. On the midnight of 21 November 1971, PNS Hangor, under the command of Commander Ahmed Tasnim, began her reconnaissance operations. Both PNS Ghazi and PNS Hangor maintained coordination and communication throughout patrol operations. On 2 and 3 December, Hangor had detected a large formation of ships from Indian Navy's Western fleet which included cruiser INS Mysore. Hangor had passed an intelligence to Pakistan naval forces of a possible attack by the observed Indian Armada near Karachi. The Indian Naval Intelligence intercepted these transmissions, and dispatched two anti-submarine warfare frigates, INS Khukri and INS Kirpan of 14th Squadron – Western Naval Command.

On 9 December 1971, at 1957 hours, Hangor sunk Khukri with two homing torpedoes. According to her commander, the frigate sank within the matter of two minutes. The frigate sank with 192 hands on board. Hangor also attacked INS Kirpan on two separate occasions, but the torpedoes had missed their target. Kirpan quickly disengaged and successfully evaded the fired torpedoes.

== Khulna incident ==
Indian Army Eastern Command had ordered Bangladesh Navy gunboats BNS Palash and BNS Padma, accompanied by INS Panvel (CO: Lt. Commander J. P. A. Noronha, Indian Navy) and under the overall command of Commander M. N. Samant of Indian Navy, to sail to the port at Mongla in an anti-shipping mission. The Bangladesh Navy ships flew the national ensign, carried Bengali seamen and Indian command crews, and, under the advice of Indian Eastern Air command, had painted their superstructure yellow to avoid misidentification and fixed 15 feet by 10 feet yellow cloths on their bridges to identify them as friendly crafts to the IAF. This had been reported back to Eastern Air Command. This task force ("Alpha Force"), accompanied by BST craft Chitrangada sailed from Hasnabad on 6 December, entered Mongla at 7:30 AM on 10 December, and took over the abandoned port facility. Commander Samant then decided to sail towards Khulna, which was 70 miles east of Dum Dum airport, lay north of the bomb line and a designated target of IAF planes. This was not part of the mission but Commander Samant decided to push on anyway, leaving Chitrangada at Mongla.

The flotilla sailed along the Pasur river was closing on Khulna Shipyard by 11:45 AM, Panvel in the lead, followed by and Palash when three Gnats dived on them. Commander Samant on INS Panvel recognized the IAF planes and ordered all the ships to hold fire. The Gnats hit BNS Padma with rockets, which caught fire and sank. Palash was hit next, her captain refused to open fire on the Gnats and beached the ship, where it was again attacked. Bengali engine room artificer Muhammad Ruhul Amin was critically wounded, while trying to keep the ship operational although others were abandoning the ship. Panvel opened up on the IAF planes, then beached on the riverbank and made smoke to appear critically damaged. After the IAF planes departed, Panvel rescued some of the survivors and returned to Indian territory. The incident cost the lives of three Bengali naval commandos and 7 Bengali sailors including Muhibullah Bir Bikrom, while 6 naval commandos, 1 BSF JCO, 3 Indian officers, and 7 Bengali seamen were injured. Twenty one Indian and Bengali sailors became POWs.

The Indian Navy gave 13 awards (including 3 Maha Vir Chakras and 5 Vir Chakras) to the Indian rank-and-file involved in this incident. Bengali engine room artificer Muhammad Ruhul Amin, who tried to save BNS Palash despite being wounded and ordered to abandon ship, and who later died under torture after being taken captive, was awarded the Bir Sreshtho medal by the Government of Bangladesh.

== Successive Indian missile boat strikes ==
On 6 December, a false alarm by a Pakistani Fokker aircraft carrying naval observers caused a friendly fire confrontation between Pakistan's Navy and Air Force. A PAF jet mistakenly strafed the frigate PNS Zulfikar, breaking off shortly after the ship got itself recognised by frantic efforts. The crew suffered some casualties besides the damage to ship. The ship was taken back to port for repair.

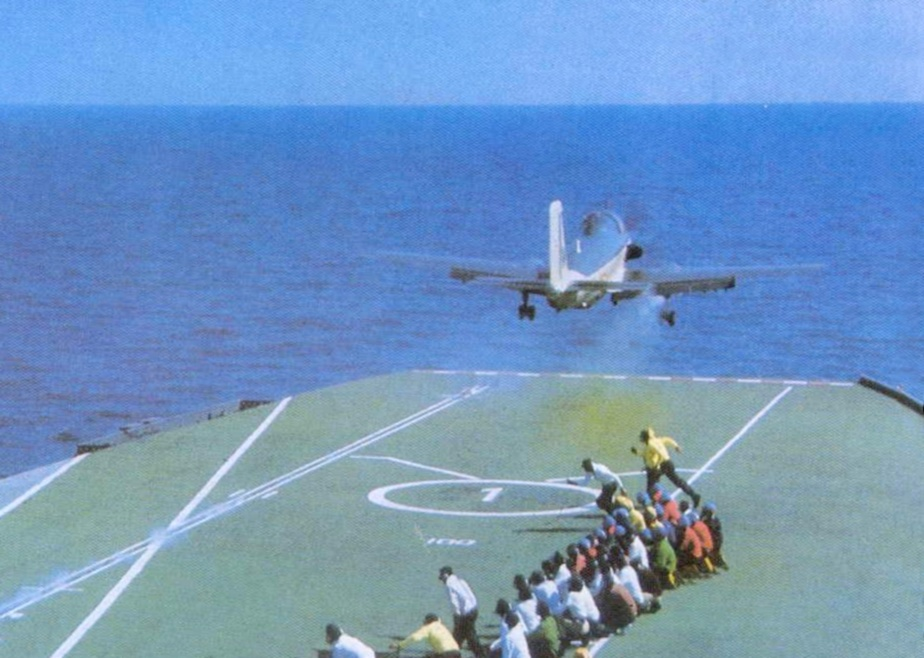
An Alizé aircraft takes off from Indian carrier Vikrant

The Indian Navy launched a second large-scale operation on the midnight of 8 and 9 December 1971. The operation, codenamed Operation Python, was commenced under the command of Chief of Naval Staff of the Indian Navy Admiral S.M. Nanda. INS Vinash, a missile boat, and two multipurpose frigates, INS Talwar and INS Trishul participated in the operation. The attack squadron approached Karachi and fired four missiles. During the raid, the Panamanian vessel Gulf Star and the British ship SS Harmattan were sunk and Pakistan Navy's fleet tanker PNS Dacca received heavy damage. More than 50% of Karachi's total fuel reserves were destroyed in the attack. More than $3 billion worth of economic and social sector damage was inflicted by the Indian Navy. Most of Karachi's oil reserves were lost and warehouses and naval workshops destroyed. The operation damaged the Pakistani economy and hindered the Pakistan Navy's operations along the western coast.

== Conclusion ==
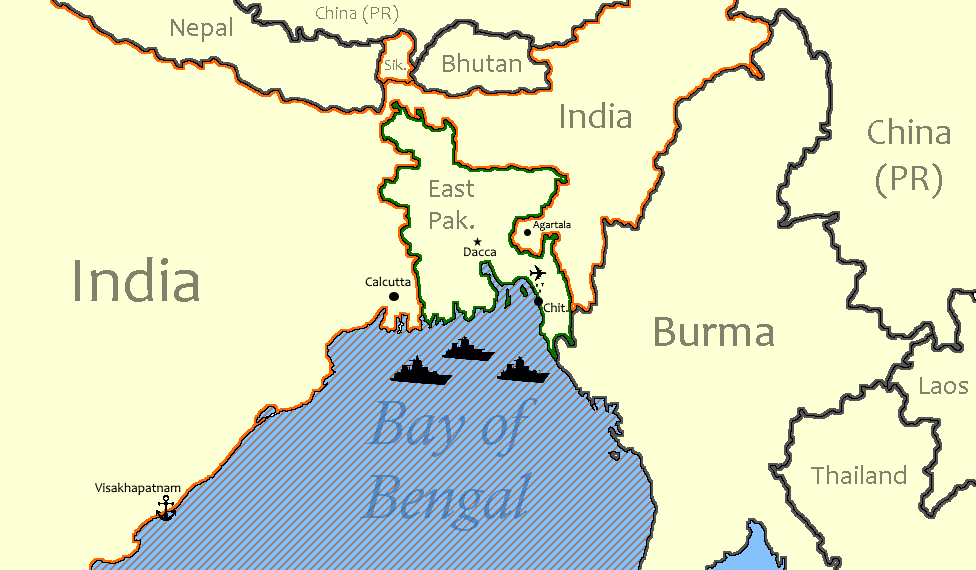
Indian Navy imposed successful blockade in Eastern theatre meanwhile the Airforce bombed Chittagong

After the successful operations by Indian Navy, India controlled the Persian Gulf and Pakistani oil route. The Pakistani Navy's main ships were either destroyed or forced to remain in port. A partial naval blockade was imposed by the Indian Navy on the port of Karachi and no merchant ship could approach Karachi. Shipping traffic to and from Karachi, Pakistan's only major port at that time, ceased. Within a few days after the attacks on Karachi, the Eastern fleet of Indian Navy had success over the Pakistani forces in East Pakistan.Furthermore, the successful Indian Air Operations and Operation Jackpot, led by the Bengali units with the support of Indian Army, undermined the operational capability of Pakistan Navy. Many naval officers (mostly Bengalis) had defected from the Navy and fought against the Pakistan Navy.

The War ended for both the fronts after the Instrument of Surrender of Pakistani forces stationed in East Pakistan was signed at Ramna Race Course in Dhaka at 16.31 IST on 16 December 1971, by Lieutenant General A. A. K. Niazi, Commander of Pakistani forces in East Pakistan and accepted by Lieutenant General Jagjit Singh Aurora, General Officer Commanding-in-chief of Eastern Command of the Indian Army.

On 16 December, at 16:13hrs, Rear-Admiral Mohammad Shariff surrendered his Naval Command to Vice-Admiral Nilakanta Krishnan Commander-in-Chief of the Eastern Naval Command. Sharif surrendered his TT pistol to Krishnan at 1631 hrs saying "Admiral Krishnan, Sir, soon I will be disarmed. Your Navy fought magnificently and had us cornered everywhere. There is no one I would like to surrender my arms to other than the Commander-in-Chief of the Eastern Fleet." His TT Pistol is still placed in "cover glass" where his name is printed in big golden letters at the Indian Military Academy's Museum. In 1972, U.S. Navy's Chief of Naval Operations (CNO) and Indian Navy's Chief of Naval Staff Admiral Sardarilal Mathradas Nanda also paid him a visit with basket of fruits and cakes which initially surprised him, and was concern of his health. While meeting with them, Admiral Shariff summed up that:

At the end of conflict.... We [Navy] had no intelligence and hence, were both deaf and blind with the Indian Navy and Indian Air Force pounding us day and night....

— Admiral Mohammad Sharif telling Admiral Zumwalt in 1971,

Admiral Shariff wrote in a 2010 thesis that "the generals in Air Force and Army, were blaming each other for their failure whilst each of them projected them as hero of the war who fought well and inflicted heavy casualties on the advancing Indians". At the end, each general officers in the Air Force and Army placed General Niazi's incompetency and failure as responsible for causing the war, Sharif concluded. Sharif also noted that:

The initial military success (Searchlight and Barisal) in regaining the law and order situation in East-Pakistan in March of 1971 was misunderstood as a complete success.... In actuality, the law and order situation deteriorated with time, particularly after September of the same year when the population turned increasingly against the [Pakistan] Armed Forces as well as the [Yahya's military] government. The rapid increase in the number of troops though bloated the overall strength, however, [it] did not add to our fighting strength to the extent that was required. A sizeable proportion of the new additions were too old, inexperienced or unwilling....

— Rear Admiral Mohammad Sharif, Flag Officer Commanding, Eastern Naval Command (Pakistan),

=== Casualities ===
The damage inflicted on the Pakistani Navy stood at 7 gunboats, 1 minesweeper, 1 submarine, 2 destroyers, 3 patrol craft belonging to the coast guard, 18 cargo, supply and communication vessels, and large scale damage inflicted on the naval base and docks in the coastal town of Karachi. Three merchant navy ships – Anwarbaksh, Pasni and Madhumathi – and ten smaller vessels were captured. Around 1900 personnel were lost, while 1413 servicemen were captured by Indian forces in Dhaka. According to one Pakistan scholar, Tariq Ali, the Pakistan Navy lost a third of its force in the war.The damage inflicted on the Indian Navy stood at 1 frigate, 1 minesweeper, 3 patrol boat, 1 Naval Aircraft additionally 2 Mukti Bahini gunboats destroyed.

== See also ==
- Indo-Pakistani War of 1971
- Timeline of the Bangladesh Liberation War
- Military plans of the Bangladesh Liberation War
- Mitro Bahini order of battle
- Pakistan Army order of battle, December 1971
- Evolution of Pakistan Eastern Command plan
- 1971 Bangladesh genocide
- Operation Searchlight
- Indo-Pakistani wars and conflicts
- Military history of India
- List of military disasters
- List of wars involving India

== Sources ==
- Jacob, J. F. R. (2004) [First published 1997]. Surrender at Dacca: Birth of A Nation. The University Press Limited. ISBN 984-05-1532-2.
- Mohan, P V S Jagan; Chopra, Samir (2013). Eagles over Bangladesh: The Indian Air Force in the 1971 Liberation War. Harper Collins India. ISBN 978-93-5136-163-3.
- Salik, Siddiq (1997) [First published 1977]. Witness to Surrender. Oxford University Press. ISBN 81-7062-108-9.
