= INS Vinash =

The following ships of the Indian Navy have been named INS Vinash:

- INS Vinash (K85) was a Vidyut-class missile boat of the Indian Navy which served in the Indo-Pakistani War of 1971
- INS Vinash (K47) is a Veer-class corvette, currently in active service with the Indian Navy
