= K85 =

K85 or K-85 may refer to:

- K-85 (Kansas highway), a state highway in Kansas
- HMS Verbena (K85), a former UK Royal Navy ship
- INS Vinash (K85), a former Indian Navy ship
