= Operation Python =

Part of the Indo-Pakistani War of 1971

- Part of Indo-Pakistani War of 1971
Date	8–9 December 1971
Location	Arabian Sea, 12 nmi (22 km; 14 mi) off Karachi Port, Pakistan
Result	Indian victory, partial de facto naval blockade of Pakistan.

Belligerents
India	Pakistan

Commanders and leaders
Rear Admiral. E. C. Kuruvila; Commanding Officers of the ships engaged	Rear Admiral Hasan Ahmed; Commanding Officers of the ships engaged

Units involved
Indian Navy	Pakistan Navy

Strength
One missile boat; Two multipurpose frigates; One Submarine (did not participate)	A group of ships stationed off the coast of Karachi

Casualties and losses
None	1 fleet tanker damaged beyond repair; Oil storage facility destroyed
- 2 merchant vessels sunk, several civilians killed and injured

Operation Python, a follow-up to Operation Trident, was the code name of a naval attack launched on West Pakistan's port city of Karachi by the Indian Navy during the Indo-Pakistani War of 1971. After the first attack during Operation Trident on the Port of Karachi, Pakistan stepped up aerial surveillance of its coast as the presence of large Indian Navy ships gave the impression that another attack was being planned. Pakistani warships attempted to outsmart the Indian Navy by mingling with merchant shipping. To counter these moves, Operation Python was launched on the night of 8/9 December 1971. A strike group consisting of one missile boat and two frigates attacked the group of ships off the coast of Karachi. While India suffered no losses, Pakistani fleet tanker PNS Dacca was damaged beyond repair, and the Kemari Oil Storage facility was lost. Two other foreign ships stationed in Karachi were also sunk during the attack.

== Background ==
In 1971, the Port of Karachi housed the headquarters of the Pakistan Navy and almost the entire Pakistan Naval fleet was based at Karachi Harbour. It was also the hub of Pakistan's maritime trade. Pakistan Air Force's shore-based aircraft were tasked with providing uninterrupted cover to Karachi port, against any possible air strikes. It also gained significance as it was the only major seaport in West Pakistan.

Towards the end of 1971, there were rising tensions between India and Pakistan, and after Pakistan declared a national emergency on 23 November, the Indian Navy deployed three Vidyut-class missile boats in the vicinity of Okha, near Karachi, to carry out patrols. As the Pakistani fleet would also be operating in the same waters, the Indian Navy set a demarcation line which ships in their fleet would not cross. Later this deployment proved to be useful to gain experience in the region's waters. On 3 December, after Pakistan attacked Indian airfields along the border, the Indo-Pakistani War of 1971 officially began.

== Operation ==
=== Prelude ===
The Indian Naval Headquarters (NHQ) in Delhi along with the Western Naval Command planned to attack the strategically important Port of Karachi. A strike group under Western Naval Command, was formed. This strike group was to be formed around the three Vidyut-class missile boats already deployed off the coast of Okha. However these had limited operational and radar range and to overcome this difficulty, it was decided to assign support vessels to the group. On 4 December, what was now designated as the Karachi Strike Group was formed and consisted of the three Vidyut-class missile boats: INS Nipat, INS Nirghat and INS Veer, each armed with four P-15 Termit (SS-N-2B Styx) surface-to-surface missiles with a range of 40 nautical miles (74 km; 46 mi), two Arnala-class anti-submarine corvettes: INS Kiltan and INS Katchall, and a fleet tanker, INS Poshak. The group was under the command of Commander Babru Bhan Yadav, the Commanding Officer of the 25th Missile Boat Squadron. (25-KS)

On the night of 4/5 December, the Indian Navy launched Operation Trident with the Karachi Strike Group off the coast of Karachi. This operation saw the first use of anti-ship missiles in combat in the region and inflicted heavy damage on the Pakistanis. While India suffered no losses, Pakistan lost one minesweeper, one destroyer, a cargo vessel carrying ammunition, and fuel storage tanks in Karachi. Another destroyer was also badly damaged and had, eventually, to be scrapped. The Pakistan Air Force retaliated against these attacks by bombing Okha Harbour, scoring direct hits on fueling facilities for missile boats, an ammunition dump, and the missile boats' jetty. The Indian Navy had anticipated this attack and had already moved the missile boats to other locations to prevent any losses.

Though the Indian Navy had strategic victory with Operation Trident, its main target, the oil storage facilities in Karachi were still operational as only one of the two missiles fired had hit them. This failure was later assessed as the result of confusion created between the commanding officers of the three missile boats. Furthermore, the Indians mistook tracer fire from the coastal artillery of Karachi as originating from Pakistani aircraft and retreated hurriedly before they could properly target the tanks. After the first attack during Operation Trident on the Port of Karachi, Pakistan stepped up aerial surveillance of its coast as the presence of large Indian Navy ships gave the impression that another attack was being planned. Pakistani warships attempted to outsmart the Indian Navy by mingling with merchant shipping. To counter these moves, Operation Python was launched.

=== Attack ===
On the night of 8/9 December 1971, at 10:00 pm Pakistan Standard Time (PKT), in rough seas, a small strike group consisting of the missile boat INS Vinash, equipped with four Styx missiles, and two multipurpose frigates, INS Talwar and INS Trishul, approached Manora, a peninsula south of the Port of Karachi. During their voyage, a Pakistani patrol vessel was encountered and sunk. The Indian Navy's official historian, Vice Admiral Hiranandani in his book Transition to Triumph, mentioned that while the group approached Karachi, Trishul's electronic surveillance revealed that the radar there had stopped rotating and was directed straight at the group, confirming that it had been detected. The submarine INS Karanj again monitored the entire attack from a distance.

Around 11.00 pm (PKT), the group detected a batch of ships at a distance of 12 nmi (22 km; 14 mi). Vinash immediately fired all four of its missiles, the first of which struck the fuel tanks at the Kemari Oil Farm causing a heavy explosion. Another missile hit and sank the Panamanian fuel tanker SS Gulf Star. The third and fourth missiles hit the Pakistani Navy fleet tanker PNS Dacca and the British merchant ship SS Harmattan. Dacca was damaged beyond repair, while Harmattan sank. As Vinash had now expended all of its missiles, the group immediately withdrew to the nearest Indian port.

Between Operations Trident and Python, and the Indian Air Force attacks on Karachi's fuel and ammunition depots, more than fifty percent of the total fuel requirement of the Karachi zone was reported to have been destroyed. The result was a crippling economic blow to Pakistan. The damage was estimated to be worth $3 billion, with most of the oil reserves and ammunition warehouses and workshops destroyed. The Pakistan Air Force was also affected by the loss of fuel.

== Aftermath ==
With no casualties observed on the Indian side, both missile attacks (Trident and Python) led the Pakistan Navy to take extreme measures to prevent any further damage. The rescue efforts were immediately coordinated by Rear Admiral Patrick Simpson who kept morale high among the Pakistani Navy officers. For this, he was awarded the Sitara-e-Jurat. Lieutenant Commander Vijay Jerath, the commanding officer of Vinash, was awarded the Vir Chakra for this operation. The Pakistani High Command ordered ships to reduce their ammunition dumps so as to reduce the explosion damage if hit. The ships were also ordered not to maneuver out at sea, especially during the night, unless ordered to do so. These two measures severely demoralized Pakistani naval crews. With the destruction caused by the Indian Navy, neutral merchant vessels soon started to seek safe passage from the Indian authorities before heading to Karachi. Gradually, neutral ships ceased sailing for Karachi. In effect, a de facto naval blockade was created by the Indian Navy. Civilian casualties from the attack included at least seven killed and six wounded on the British merchant ship Harmattan.

== See Also ==
- INS Khukri
- Indo-Pakistani War of 1971
- Operation Searchlight
- Operation Triumph/Falcon
- Indo-Pakistani wars and conflicts
- Indo-Pakistani Naval War of 1971
- List of ships sunk by missiles

== Sources ==
- Hiranandani, Gulab Mohanlal (2000), Transition to Triumph: History of the Indian Navy, 1965–1975, Lancer Publishers LLC, ISBN 978-1-897829-72-1
- Jaques, Tony (2007), Dictionary of Battles and Sieges: F-O, Greenwood Publishing Group, ISBN 978-0-313-33538-9
- Karim, Afsir (1996), Indo-Pak Relations: Viewpoints, 1989-1996, Lancer Publishers LLC, ISBN 978-1-897829-23-3
