= USNS Mission San Luis Rey =

WW II tanker

History

United States
- Laid down: 15 October 1943
- Launched: 29 January 1944
- Acquired: 23 October 1947
- In service: 23 October 1947
- Out of service: 19 November 1957
- Stricken: 19 November 1957
- Fate: Sold for scrap, 7 November 1972

General characteristics
- Displacement: 21,880 tons full; 5,532 tons light
- Length: 524 ft (160 m)
- Beam: 68 ft (21 m)
- Draft: 30 ft (9 m)
- Propulsion: Turbo-electric, single screw, 6,000 hp (4.5 MW)
- Speed: 16.5 knots (31 km/h)
- Complement: 52 mariners

SS Mission San Luis Rey was a Type T2-SE-A2 tanker built for the United States Maritime Commission during World War II. After the war she was acquired by the United States Navy as USS Mission San Luis Rey (AO-128). Later the tanker transferred to the Military Sea Transportation Service as USNS Mission San Luis Rey (T-AO-128). She was a Mission Buenaventura-class oiler and was named for Mission San Luis Rey de Francia, located in Oceanside, California.

== Career ==
Mission San Luis Rey was laid down 15 October 1943 under a United States Maritime Commission contract by Marine Ship Corporation, Sausalito, California; launched 29 January 1944; sponsored by Mrs. T. L. Phillips; and delivered 31 March 1944. Chartered to Pacific Tankers, Inc. for operations, she spent the remainder of the War carrying fuel to Allied bases overseas (during which time she was awarded the National Defense Service Medal). She served in this capacity until 29 March 1946 when she was returned to the Maritime Commission and laid up in the Maritime Reserve Fleet at James River, Virginia.

Acquired by the Navy 23 October 1947 she was placed in service with the Naval Transportation Service as Mission San Luis Rey (AO-128) and remained in this service until 1 October 1949 when she was transferred to the newly created Military Sea Transportation Service for duty as USNS Mission San Luis Rey (T-AO-128). She remained in this capacity until 6 May 1955 when she was returned to the Maritime Administration (MARAD) and laid up in the Maritime Reserve Fleet at Suisun Bay, California. She was struck from the Naval Vessel Register on 22 June 1955.

Reacquired by the Navy on 22 June 1956 she was placed in service with MSTS. She served with MSTS until 19 November 1957 when she was again struck from the U.S. Naval Vessel Register on that same date and transferred to the Maritime Administration for lay up in the Maritime Reserve Fleet at Beaumont, Texas.

Sold as scrap on 7 November 1972 for $103,133.00. Removed from Beaumont on 18 December 1972 to be towed to breakers.
