= Operation Triumph/Falcon =

Indian combat action in 1971

- Part of Indo-Pakistani War of 1971
Date	10–13 December 1971
Location	Arabian Sea
Result	Missile strikes cancelled following loss of INS Khukri, mission evolved into a SAR and Sea Denial mission

Belligerents
India	Pakistan

Units involved
Indian Navy	Pakistan Navy

Strength
Vidyut-class missile boats; Arnala-class anti-submarine corvettes	Ships deployed off the coast of Karachi PNS Hangor

Operation Triumph was a planned Indian naval operation to strike the Karachi Naval harbour during the 1971 Indo-Pakistan war. The mission was cancelled following the loss of the Indian frigate INS Kukri, which led the Indian Navy to launch Operation Falcon to hunt down the submarine PNS Hangor.

== Background ==
The Indian Naval command had planned the entire operation on the fact that the Pakistani Navy severely underestimated the strength of its Vidyut-class missile boat squadron. Pakistan had been offered the Osa class missile vessels by the Soviet Union in early 1970 but Pakistani doctrine led them to conclude that the ships were not big enough to operate within the Indian Ocean. In sharp contrast, India immediately adopted the ships, purchasing a squadron as a part of enlarging the navy. These missile boats were transported to India on heavy lift merchant ships and commissioned in early 1971 in Kolkata, from where, they were towed to Bombay.

The India strike group planned to tow missile vessels by either Arnala class corvettes or Talwar class Frigates, following as escort vessels, following which the missile squadron would sneak into the Shoreline and fire their missiles in Salvos. On the way to and from, they were to be refuelled by the Indian Fuel tanker Poshak. The first portion of India's Karachi strike force would be called Operation Trident and was scheduled for 5 December. A secondary missile strike called Operation Python would mop up forces that were not damaged during Trident and a final Operation Triumph was decimate any remaining ships that survived the other two attacks. An cruiser group concentrated around the INS Mysore was to patrol the North Arabian sea and engage targets of opportunity as well as capture any vessels headed towards Pakistan. The group was also to follow the missile boat attack by shelling positions off the Makran coast. However, the broader success of Operation Python on the night of 9 December led to disquiet within the elements of the naval high command for the need to commence further attacks.

== Operation Triumph ==
During the run-up to the expected hostilities, The Indian naval high command serialised a series of plans to attack the Pakistani navy within the port of Karachi. The Western fleet thereby deputed elements of the 22th missile boat squadron, using recently acquired Vidyut class missile boats for the Task. The Indian vessels were to deploy from Bombay harbour towards the Saurastra coast. On 2 December, in the face of imminent hostilities, Admiral SM Nanda ordered the fleet to be kept ready to sail at a moments notice. The submarine PNS Hangor intercepted transmissions from the warships belonging to the Western Naval Command of the Indian Navy . The submarine was passed over by the large Squadron of the Western fleet of the Indian Navy. She reported that the large cruiser INS Mysore passed directly over the submarine. The submarine subsequently torpedoed the Indian frigates INS Kuhkri and attempted to attack INS Kirpan.

The sinking of INS Kuhkri led the Indian Navy to further redeploy its ships to conduct a search for survivors and attempt to hunt down the offending submarine. Operation Triumph was then called off by Admiral SM Nanda as he believed that the navy's element of surprise would have been lost earlier than the other two attacks and to redeploy the escorting capital ships to track down Hangor.

== Operation Falcon ==
Following the loss of INS Kuhkri, the Indian Navy mobilised its forces to seek and destroy the Pakistani Submarine Hangor. The operation was launched on the night of 9 December and continued for four days till the night of 13 December, when the Pakistani forces requested for a ceasefire to end the war. During these four days, the Indian Navy utilized all available anti-submarine ships, and it's fleet of Bregut Alize and Sea King ASW helicopters and combed an area extending from the point southwest of Diu right uptil the Karachi coast. Indian search forces also managed to rescue six officers and 61 surviving sailors of the submarine attack, when forces under INS Kirpan and INS Katchall returned the following morning under screened escorts. The Navy further deployed a squadron of Alize aircraft and Seeking helicopters off Saurashtra Coast to deter any more misadventures.

The crew of Hangor survived 36 salvos of Depth charges and reached Karachi on 18 December, with severely depleted batteries. The Crew counted a total of 156 attacks prior to the ceasefire being established.

== Aftermath ==
While the hunt for Hangor proved futile, the deployment of the Western fleet under operation Falcon achieved its secondary objective of imposing a total maritime blockade over western Pakistan. No other Pakistani ship deployed to support combat operations, giving the Indian forces absolute sea control over the northern Arabian sea.

== See also ==
- Operation Trident
- Operation Python
- PNS Ghazi
