= Rashid Ahmed =

Rear Admiral of the Pakistan Navy

Rear Admiral Rashid Ahmed
- Born: 1918; British India
- Died: 2005 (aged 86–87)
- Military career
- Allegiance: Pakistan
- Branch: Royal Indian Navy (1941–47); Pakistan Navy (1947–72)
- Service years: 1938–1972
- Rank: Rear Admiral
- Service number: PN. 12
- Unit: Executive Branch
- Commands: Chief of Staff, Pakistan Navy; National Shipping Corporation; DCNS (Operations)
- Conflicts: World War II; Indo-Pakistani War of 1965; Indo-Pakistani War of 1971
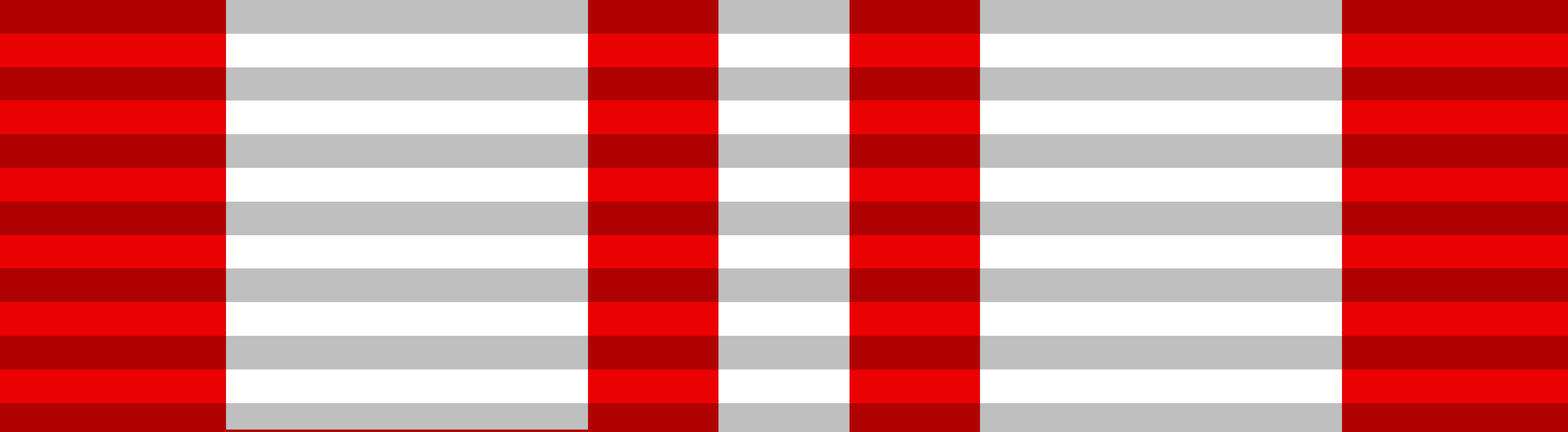
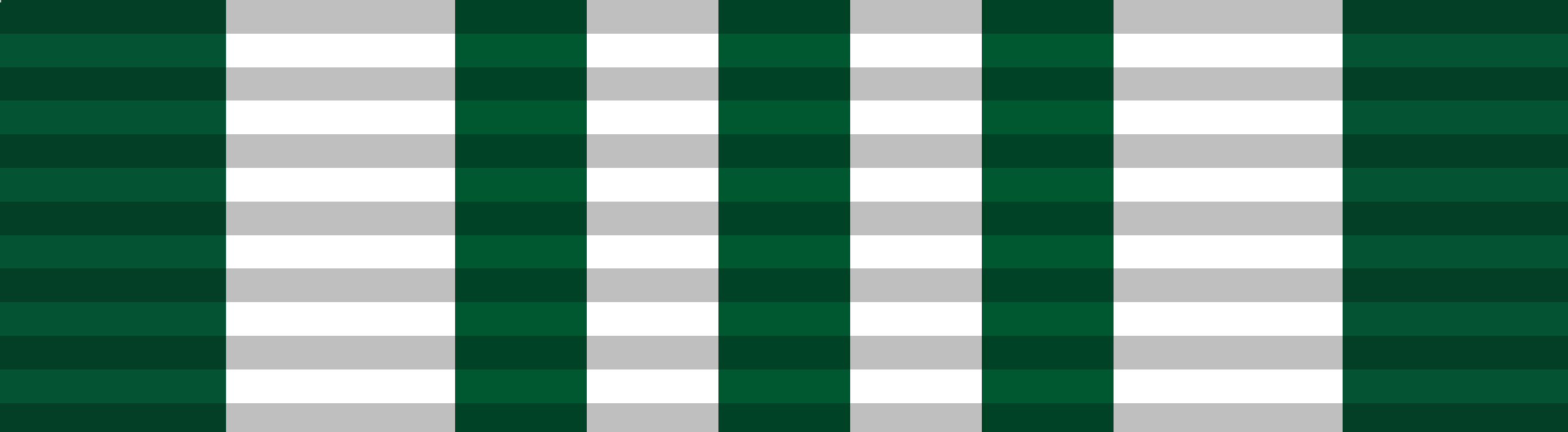
- Awards: Sitara-i-Khidmat Tamgha-e-Pakistan

Rashid Ahmed (Urdu: رشيد احمد; b. 1918–2005) SK TQA was a two-star rank admiral in the Pakistan Navy, who is known for serving as Chief of Staff under Commander in Chief Vice-Admiral Muzaffar Hassan and led the Navy during the fateful events in the war with India in 1971.

== Biography ==
Rashid Ahmed was born in British India and joined the Royal Indian Navy (RIN) in 1938 where he participated in World War II in the Burma Campaign. He was stationed in the Andaman and Nicobar Islands, and served against the Imperial Japanese Navy in Burma in 1944–45.

After World War II, he was sent to attend the Britannia Royal Naval College in 1945–47, where he specialized in technical courses, and returned to India. At the time of his transfer to Pakistan Navy, he was serving in the Executive Branch with the rank of Lieutenant-Commander, with service number PN.12. After the partition of India, he was sent to the United Kingdom to attend the Joint Service Defence College in 1949–51, and returned to take command assignment at the Navy Headquarters in Karachi, at that time. In 1952–56, Lt.Cdr Ahmed served and later commanded the PNS Tariq and did a tour to Suez Canal before returning.

In 1960s, Captain Rashid Ahmed served was the DCNS (Operations), and participated in the second war with India in 1965. In 1967–69, Commodore Ahmed briefly tenured as the managing-director of the National Shipping Corporation and subsequently left the post. In 1969, Rear-Admiral Rashid Ahmed was moved to Navy NHQ, and appointed as Chief of Staff under Commander in Chief Vice-Admiral Muzaffar Hassan. In 1971, he visited China to hold talks in procuring defence equipments for the Navy, along with Lieutenant-General Gul Hassan Khan.

As chief of staff, he led the Pakistan Navy during the fateful events in the 1971 war against India, and after the signed surrender went into effect that marked the succession of East-Pakistan as Bangladesh, Rear-Admiral Ahmed was among the highest flag ranking officer, who were superseded by their juniors, for the command assignments. In April 1972, Rear-Admiral Ahmed was forcefully retired from his service. After his retirement, he worked for the National Shipping Corporation and the Pakistan State Oil as its managing-director in 1980s, and subsequently lived a quiet life in Islamabad, dying in 2005.
