= USNS Mission San Jose =

History

United States
- Name: Mission San Jose
- Laid down: 17 July 1943
- Launched: 7 October 1943
- Acquired: 5 November 1947
- In service: 5 November 1947
- Out of service: 15 October 1957
- Stricken: 15 October 1957
- Identification: IMO number: 6621234
- Fate: Sold, 24 June 1966; Scrapped 22 April 2011

General characteristics
- Displacement: 21,880 tons full; 5,532 tons light
- Length: 524 ft (160 m)
- Beam: 68 ft (21 m)
- Draft: 30 ft (9 m)
- Propulsion: Turbo-electric, single screw, 6,000 hp (4.5 MW)
- Speed: 16.5 knots (31 km/h)
- Complement: 52 mariners

SS Mission San Jose was a Type T2-SE-A2 tanker built for the United States Maritime Commission during World War II. After the war she was acquired by the United States Navy as USS Mission San Jose. Later the tanker transferred to the Military Sea Transportation Service as USNS Mission San Jose. She was a Mission Buenaventura-class oiler and was named for Mission San José, located in Fremont, California.

== Career ==
Mission San Jose was laid down 17 July 1943 under a Maritime Commission contract by Marine Ship Corporation, Sausalito, California; launched 7 October 1943; sponsored by Mrs. Robert L. Bridges and delivered 29 January 1944. Chartered to Pacific Tankers Inc. for operations, she spent the remainder of the war carrying fuel to Allied forces overseas. She served in this capacity until 3 May 1946, when she was returned to the Maritime Commission and laid up in the Maritime Reserve Fleet at Mobile, Alabama.

Acquired by the Navy on 5 November 1947, she was placed in service with the Naval Transportation Service as Mission San Jose (AO-125). After 1 October 1949, she was under the operational control of the new Military Sea Transportation Service (MSTS) as USNS Mission San Jose (T-AO-I25). She served with MSTS until 15 October 1957, when she was struck from the Naval Vessel Register and transferred to the Maritime Administration (MARAD) for lay up in the Maritime Reserve Fleet at Suisun Bay, California.

The ship was sold to the Hudson Waterways Corporation on 24 June 1966, and renamed Seatrain Ohio. She was subsequently lengthened using sections of two other T2 tankers, the Tomahawk and Mission San Diego, and rebuilt by Maryland Shipbuilding and Drydock Company into one of seven Seatrain Lines multi-purpose cargo ships capable of carrying general bulk and palletized cargo, intermodal containers, vehicles and rail cars. Upon completion of the conversion and delivery in 1967 Seatrain Ohio, IMO 6621234, was chartered to the MSTS in support of overseas U.S. military operations, including the transport of material, equipment and aircraft to Vietnam. The ship was transferred to the National Defense Reserve Fleet (James River) in November 1973 and on 8 August 1978, her name was changed to just Ohio. In 1990 Ohio was reactivated for service in support of the First Persian Gulf War and subsequently returned to the Reserve Fleet (Beaumont, Texas). The ship was retired and broken up in 2011.
