= USNS Mission San Carlos =

History

United States
- Laid down: 1 November 1943
- Launched: 12 February 1944
- Acquired: 12 November 1947
- In service: 12 November 1947
- Out of service: 6 November 1957
- Stricken: 6 November 1957
- Identification: IMO number: 6709153
- Fate: Sold, 16 May 1966

General characteristics
- Displacement: 21,880 tons full; 5,532 tons light
- Length: 524 ft (160 m)
- Beam: 68 ft (21 m)
- Draft: 30 ft (9 m)
- Propulsion: Turbo-electric, single screw, 6,000 hp (4.5 MW)
- Speed: 16.5 knots (31 km/h)
- Complement: 52 mariners

SS Mission San Carlos was a Type T2-SE-A2 tanker built for the United States Maritime Commission during World War II. After the war she was acquired by the United States Navy as USS Mission San Carlos (AO-120). Later the tanker transferred to the Military Sea Transportation Service as USNS Mission San Carlos (T-AO-120). She was a Mission Buenaventura-class oiler and was one of two U.S. Navy vessels named for Mission San Carlos Borroméo de Carmelo, located in Carmel-by-the-Sea, California, the other being Mission Carmel.

== Career ==
Mission San Carlos was laid down on 1 November 1943 under a Maritime Commission contract by Marinship Corporation, Sausalito, California: launched 12 February 1944; sponsored by Mrs. J. H. Pomeroy; and delivered 15 April 1944. Chartered to Pacific Tankers, Inc. for operations on 15 April, she spent the remainder of the War providing allied forces overseas with the vital fuel needed to keep America's armies on the move (during which time she was awarded the National Defense Service Medal). She was returned to the Maritime Commission on 20 April 1946 and laid up in the Maritime Reserve Fleet at Mobile, Alabama.

Acquired by the Navy on 12 November 1947 and chartered to Marine Transport, Inc. for operations, she was placed in service with the Naval Transportation Service as Mission San Carlos (AO-120). After 1 October 1949 she was under the operational control of the newly created Military Sea Transportation Service (MSTS) as USNS Mission San Carlos (T-AO-120). She remained in service with MSTS until 6 November 1957 when she was transferred to the Maritime Administration (MARAD) for lay up in the Maritime Reserve Fleet at Beaumont, Texas. She was struck from the Naval Vessel Register on the same date.

The ship was sold to Transwestern Associates on 16 May 1966 for conversion to a bulk carrier, but was instead resold that September to the Hudson Waterways Corporation and renamed Seatrain Maryland. She was subsequently lengthened using the forward and midsection of another T2 tanker, the San Jacinto, and rebuilt by Newport News Shipbuilding into one of seven Seatrain Lines multi-purpose cargo ships capable of carrying general bulk and palletized cargo, intermodal containers, vehicles and rail cars. Upon completion of the conversion and delivery in April 1967 Seatrain Maryland, IMO 6709153, was chartered to the MSTS in support of overseas U.S. military operations, including the transport of material, equipment and aircraft to Vietnam. The ship was transferred to the National Defense Reserve Fleet (James River) in December 1974 and on 8 August 1978, her name was changed to just Maryland. The ship was retired and broken up in 1986.
