= USNS Mission Carmel =

History

United States
- Name: Mission Carmel
- Builder: Marinship Corporation, Sausalito, California
- Laid down: 1 January 1944
- Launched: 28 March 1944
- Acquired: 21 October 1947
- In service: 21 October 1947
- Out of service: 25 October 1957
- Stricken: 25 October 1957
- Identification: IMO number: 6903151
- Fate: Sold, 7 November 1957

General characteristics
- Class & type: Mission Buenaventura-class oiler
- Displacement: 1,625 long tons (1,651 t) light; 21,880 long tons (22,231 t) full
- Length: 524 ft (160 m)
- Beam: 68 ft (21 m)
- Draft: 30 ft (9.1 m)
- Propulsion: Turbo-electric, single screw, 6,000 hp (4.5 MW)
- Speed: 16.5 knots (30.6 km/h; 19.0 mph)
- Complement: 52

SS Mission Carmel was a Type T2-SE-A2 tanker built for the United States Maritime Commission during World War II. After the war she was acquired by the United States Navy as USS Mission Carmel (AO-113). Later the tanker transferred to the Military Sea Transportation Service as USNS Mission Carmel (T-AO-113). She was a member of the Mission Buenaventura-class oiler and was one of two named for Mission San Carlos Borroméo de Carmelo located in Carmel-by-the-Sea, California, the other being Mission San Carlos.

== Service history ==
Mission Carmel was laid down on 1 January 1944 under a Maritime Commission contract by Marinship Corporation, Sausalito, California; launched on 28 March 1944, sponsored by Mrs. W. B. Lardner; and delivered on 17 May 1944. Chartered to Pacific Tankers, Inc. for operations, she spent the remainder of the war providing fuel to allied forces overseas (during which time she was awarded the National Defense Service Medal). Returned to the Maritime Commission on 11 April 1946 she was laid up in the Reserve Fleet at Portland, Oregon.

Acquired by the Navy on 21 October 1947 she was designated Mission Carmel (AO-113) and assigned to the Naval Transportation Service for operations. She continued with the Transportation Service until 1 October 1949 when the Naval Transportation Service and the Mission Carmel were absorbed into the new Military Sea Transportation Service. Redesignated USNS Mission Carmel (T-AO-113), she continued to supply US forces overseas with needed fuel products until 25 October 1957 when she was returned to the Maritime Administration (MARAD), struck from the Naval Vessel Register and laid up in the Maritime Reserve Fleet at Olympia, Washington.

Her life of service not yet over, she was sold to Litton Industries on 7 November 1957 for conversion into a dry cargo ship. Renamed Houston, into 1969 she continued her life of service under a new flag. She was resold on 28 February 1975 to Reynolds Leasing Corp.

The ship was sold for scrap to Eastern Overseas Corp, and scrapped in Spain in 1983.
