= USNS Waters =

United States Navy vessel

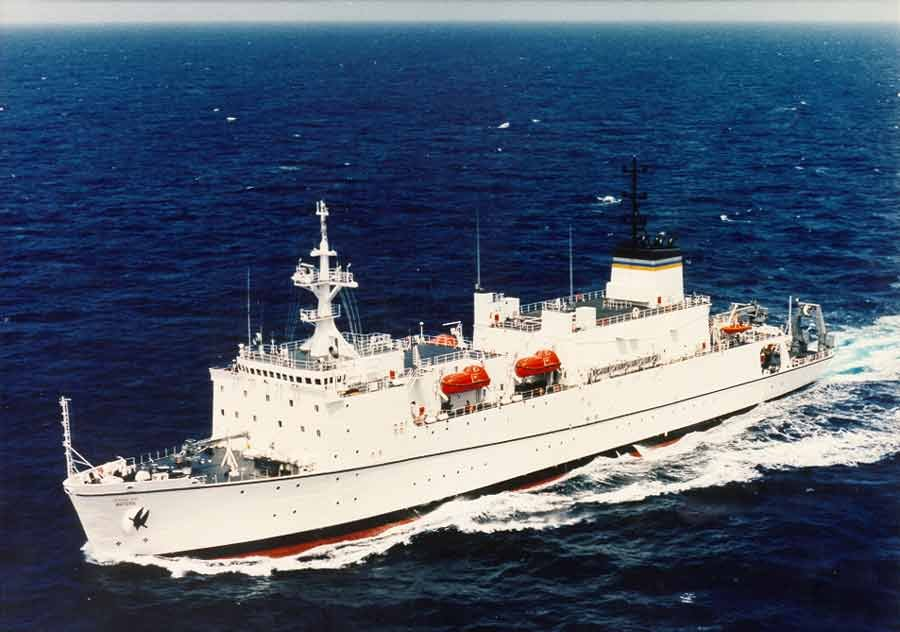

History

United States
- Name: USNS Waters
- Awarded: 4 April 1990
- Builder: Avondale Industries, Inc., New Orleans, Louisiana
- Laid down: 21 May 1991
- Launched: 6 June 1992
- In service: 26 May 1993
- Refit: 1998
- Identification: IMO number: 8982266; MMSI number: 367851000; Callsign: NWAA
- Status: In active service

General characteristics
- Displacement: 12,250 t.(fl)
- Length: 457 ft (139 m)
- Beam: 69 ft (21 m)
- Draft: 26 ft 10 in (8.18 m) (max)
- Propulsion: diesel-electric drive, twin shafts 7,400 shaft horsepower
- Speed: 14 knots (26 km/h; 16 mph)
- Complement: 32 civilians and 68 sponsors

USNS Waters (T-AGS-45) is a United States Navy vessel tasked with supporting submarine navigation-system testing and providing ballistic missile flight test support services. In 2011, it was homeported in Port Canaveral, Florida.

== Features ==
Waters is operated by Military Sealift Command under the Naval Oceanographic Office (NAVO) to provide an operating platform and services for unique U.S. military and federal government missions. The Waters primarily serves the Navy Special Systems Program (SSP) Office, but also works with Naval Sea Systems Command, Space and Naval Warfare Systems Command and the Oceanographer of the Navy.

The Waters carries the Navy Mobile Instrumentation System (NMIS), designed to obtain all necessary terminal area reentry flight test data. This capability allows flight tests to be conducted in remote portions of the oceans without needing instrumentation aircraft for support. This system's portable instrumentation provides C-band and X-band radar tracking, telemetry, optics, meteorology, and impact scoring systems. The NMIS prototype was first deployed in 1999 to support scheduled flight tests and evaluate performance. NMIS was declared fully operational by the US Navy Strategic Systems Program (SSP) in April 2003.

== Background ==
Waters was originally an oceanographic survey ship, built by the Avondale Shipyard and delivered to the US Navy in 1993. Under the sponsorship of the Strategic Systems Program Office, Waters was converted in 1998 by Norfolk Shipyard to support submarine navigation system testing and ballistic missile flight test support services. Waters began operating in the fall of 1999, replacing USNS Vanguard (T-AG 194), a submarine navigation system test platform ship, deactivated in 1998; and USNS Range Sentinel (T-AGM 22), a flight test navigation support ship deactivated in 1997.
