= USNS Mission Santa Barbara =

History

United States
- Laid down: 8 April 1944
- Launched: 8 June 1944
- Acquired: 20 October 1947
- In service: 20 October 1947
- Out of service: 8 November 1957
- Identification: IMO number: 6700456
- Fate: Sold, 26 March 1966; Scrapped 28 June 1985

General characteristics
- Displacement: 21,880 tons full; 5,532 tons light
- Length: 524 ft (160 m)
- Beam: 68 ft (21 m)
- Draft: 30 ft (9 m)
- Propulsion: Turbo-electric, single screw, 6,000 hp (4.5 MW)
- Speed: 16.5 knots (31 km/h)
- Complement: 52 mariners

SS Mission Santa Barbara was a Type T2-SE-A2 tanker built for the United States Maritime Commission during World War II. After the war she was acquired by the United States Navy as USS Mission Santa Barbara (AO-131). Later the tanker transferred to the Military Sea Transportation Service as USNS Mission Santa Barbara (T-AO-131). She was a Mission Buenaventura-class oiler and was named for Mission Santa Barbara in Santa Barbara, California.

== Career ==
Mission Santa Barbara was laid down 8 April 1944 under a Maritime Commission contract by Marine Ship Corporation, Sausalito, California; launched 8 June 1944; sponsored by Mrs. Carl H. Nilson; and delivered 8 July 1944. Chartered to Pacific Tankers, Inc. for operations, she spent the remainder of the War carrying fuel to Allied bases in the Pacific. She remained in this capacity until 8 May 1946 when she was returned to the Maritime Commission and laid up in the Maritime Reserve Fleet at Olympia, Washington.

Acquired by the Navy on 20 October 1947 she was chartered to Union Oil Company for operations and placed under the operational control of the Naval Transportation Service as Mission Santa Barbara (AO-131). Transferred to the new Military Sea Transportation Service (MSTS) on 1 October 1949, she was redesignated USNS Mission Santa Barbara (T-AO-131). She remained in service with MSTS until 12 April 1954 when she was laid up, in reserve, at the San Diego group of the Pacific Reserve Fleet. She remained in reserve until 8 October 1956 when she was once again placed in service with MSTS and chartered to the Joshua Henry Corporation for operations. She remained with MSTS until 8 November 1957 when she was transferred to the Maritime Administration (MARAD), struck from the Naval Vessel Register and laid up in the Maritime Reserve Fleet at Beaumont, Texas.

The ship was sold to the Hudson Waterways Corporation on 26 March 1966 and was renamed Seatrain Carolina on 7 April 1966. She was subsequently lengthened using part of the midsection of another T2 tanker, the Fruitvale Hills, and rebuilt by Newport News Shipbuilding into one of seven Seatrain Lines multi-purpose cargo ships capable of carrying general bulk and palletized cargo, intermodal containers, vehicles and rail cars. Upon completion of the conversion and delivery in February 1967 Seatrain Carolina, IMO 6700456, was chartered to the MSTS in support of overseas U.S. military operations, including the transport of material, equipment and aircraft to Vietnam. The ship was transferred to the National Defense Reserve Fleet (James River) in 1974 and on 8 August 1978, her name was changed to just Carolina. The ship was retired and broken up in 1985.

During her active military service she was awarded the National Defense Service Medal, the Korean Service Medal (four times), the United Nations Service Medal and the Republic of Korea War Service Medal (retroactively). She also received four battle stars for her Korean War service.
