= Pacific Tankers Inc. =

Former US shipping company

- Industry: Tanker Maritime transport
- Founded: 1943
- Founder: Kenneth D. Dawson
- Defunct: 1951
- Headquarters: San Francisco, California
- Area served: Worldwide
- Key people: John A. McCone (Chairman), Allan Cameron (GM)

Pacific Tankers, Inc. of San Francisco, California, was founded in 1943 as a division of Joshua Hendy Corporation to operate fleet oilers for the United States Navy to support World War II efforts. Pacific Tankers, Inc. operated Mission Buenaventura-class oiler, a T2 tanker (T2-SE-A2). Each Pacific Tankers, Inc. tanker had a merchant crew of about 9 officers and 39 men. Pacific Tankers Inc. was a major tanker operator for the war with a fleet of over 60 tankers. Pacific Tankers, Inc. continued operations after the war.

Joshua Hendy Corporation was founded in the 1850s as an engineering and mining company. Joshua Hendy Corporation engineering was used in the construction of the Panama Canal from 1904 to 1914. In World War II Joshua Hendy Corporation built twelve triple expansion marine steam engines for Liberty ships.

The Federal Bureau of Investigation investigated the sales of a Pacific Tankers, Inc. ship to Aristotle Onassis in 1951 and 1952.

== Pacific Tankers, Inc. ships ==
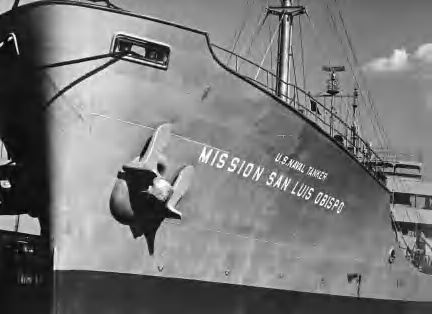
USNS ''Mission San Luis Obispo''

Some of Pacific Tankers Inc ships:

- SS Mckittrick built in 1944 (owned 1947–1951)
- SS Montebello Hills built in 1944 (owned 1948–1951)
- SS William M. Burden (SS Brookfield) built in 1944 (owned 1950–1951)
- SS Pecos (1944– )
- USS Sebec (AO-87) leased 1946 to 1950
- SS Saugatuck (owned 1947–1948)

== World War II ships ==
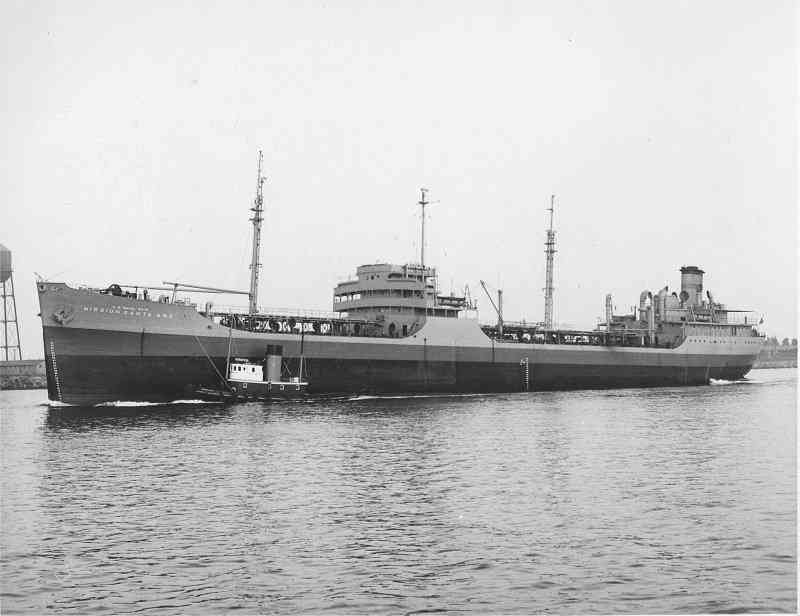
USNS Mission Santa Ana (T-AO-137) getting underway in Long Beach, California

Assembly and construction of T2 navy tankers

- Some of the US government-owned, Naval Transportation Service tankers, operated by commercial firm Pacific Tankers, Inc:
- SS Mission Santa Ynez T2
- SS Mission Soledad
- SS Mission San Fernando
- SS Mission San Jose
- SS Mission San Gabriel
- SS Redstone
- SS Mission San Miguel
- SS Mission Carmel
- SS San Luis Obispo
- SS Mission Capistrano
- SS Santa Barbara
- SS Mission Santa Clara
- SS Mission Santa Ana
- SS Mission Dolores
- SS Mission San Carlos
- SS Mission San Luis Rey
- SS Chalmette (later Lynchburg (T-AO-154))
- SS Umatilla

== See also ==
- World War II United States Merchant Navy
