= Mission San Carlos Borromeo de Carmelo =

18th-century Spanish mission in California

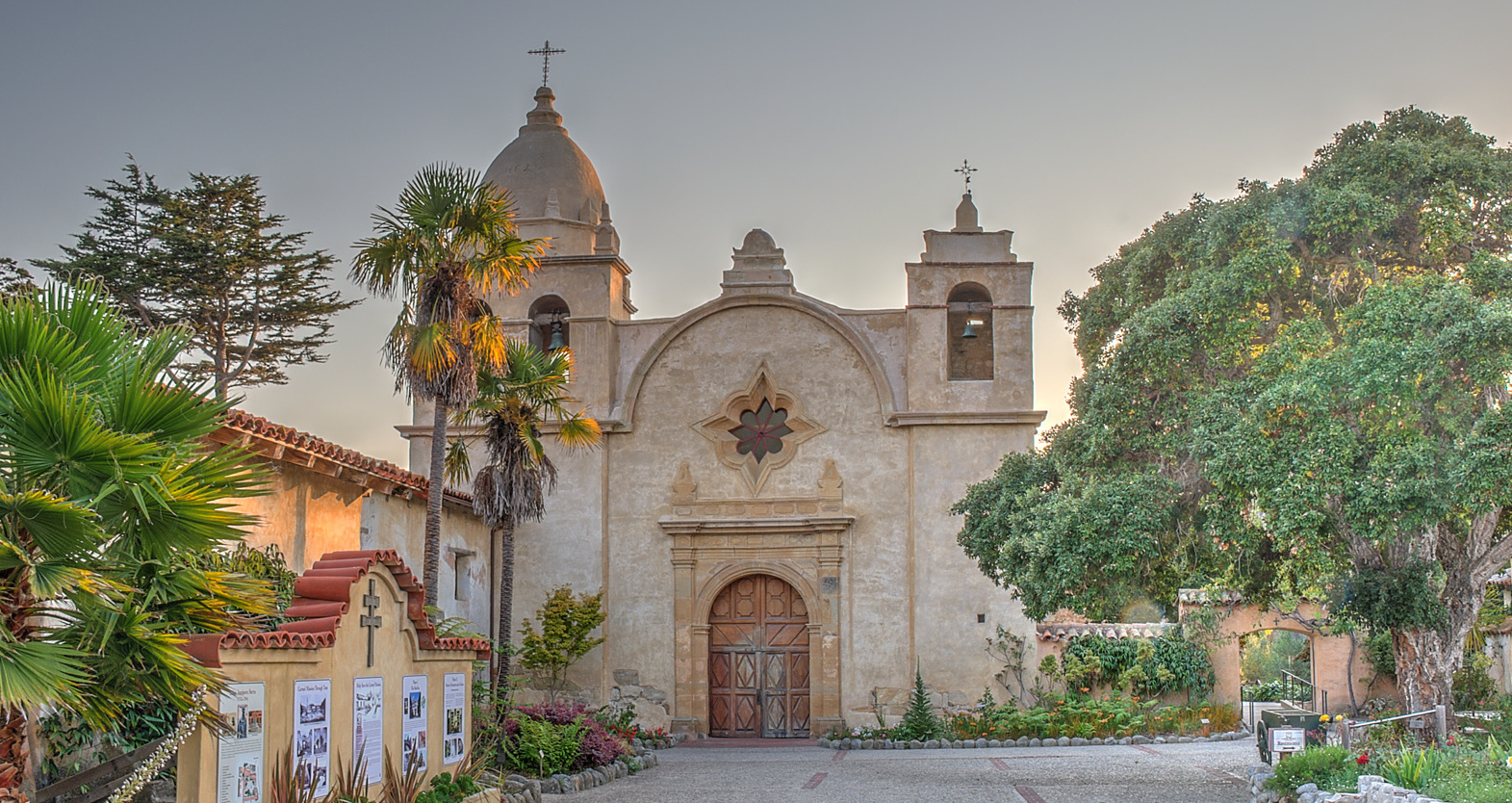
- Light-brown-painted façade of capilla (chapel) and tiled and shortened-restored cemetery wall

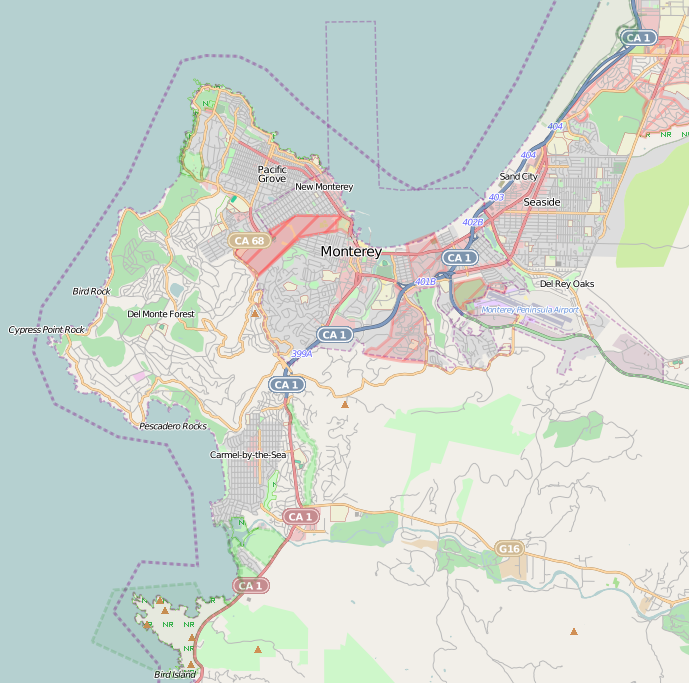
- Location on Monterey Peninsula
- Location: 3080 Rio Road, Carmel-by-the-Sea, California, U.S.
- Coordinates: 36°32′34″N 121°55′09″W
- Name as founded: La Misión San Carlos Borromeo del Río Carmelo
- English translation: The Mission of Saint Charles Borromeo of the Carmel River
- Patron: Saint Charles Borromeo
- Nickname: "Father of the Alta California Missions"
- Founded: June 3, 1770
- Founded by: Father Presidente Junípero Serra
- Founding Order: Second
- Headquarters of the Alta California Mission System: 1771–1815; 1819–1824; 1827–1830
- Military district: Third
- Native tribe: Esselen, Ohlone; Costeño
- Native place name: Ekheya
- Baptisms: 3,827
- Marriages: 1,032
- Burials: 2,837
- Secularized: 1834
- Returned to the Church: 1859
- Governing body: Roman Catholic Diocese of Monterey
- Current use: Parish Church/Minor Basilica

U.S. National Register of Historic Places
- Official name: Carmel Mission
- Designated: October 15, 1966
- Reference no.: 66000214

U.S. National Historic Landmark
- Designated: October 9, 1960

California Historical Landmark
- Reference no.: 1. 135

Website
- http://carmelmission.org

Misión San Carlos Borromeo del Río Carmelo (English: Mission Saint Charles Borromeo of the Carmel River), first built in 1771 (where the mission was moved to a year after its 1770 establishment in Monterey), is one of the most authentically restored Spanish missions in California in California. Located at the mouth of the Carmel River in Carmel, California, it is on the National Register of Historic Places and is a National Historic Landmark.

From 1770 until 1833, the Monterey/Carmel mission was the headquarters of all Alta California missions. It was headed by Junípero Serra from 1770 until his death in 1784. It was also the seat of the second mission presidente, Fermín Francisco de Lasuén, who oversaw the completion of nine more missions.

In 1833, the Alta California missions were secularized by the Mexican government. The extensive grazing lands were divided up into land grants, and Indigenous laborers were dispersed. By the mid-19th century, the Carmel mission structures had fallen into disrepair. The chapel was saved from total destruction when the roof was rebuilt in 1884. Two years later, ownership of the mission was transferred from a group of Franciscans to the Diocese of Monterey. Ever since, Carmel Mission has been a parish within that diocese.

Beginning in 1931, Harry Downie began restoring the mission and worked continuously on the project for the next 50 years. It is the only Spanish mission in California that has its original bell and bell tower. Carmel mission contains the state's first library.

== History ==
Mission Mission San Carlos Borromeo was the second mission built by Franciscan missionaries in Alta (upper) California. It was first established in Monterey, California, near the native village of Tamo on June 3, 1770, by Junípero Serra. It was named for Carlo Borromeo, Archbishop of Milan, Italy, and was the site of the first Christian confirmation in Alta California.

=== Relocation to Carmel Valley ===
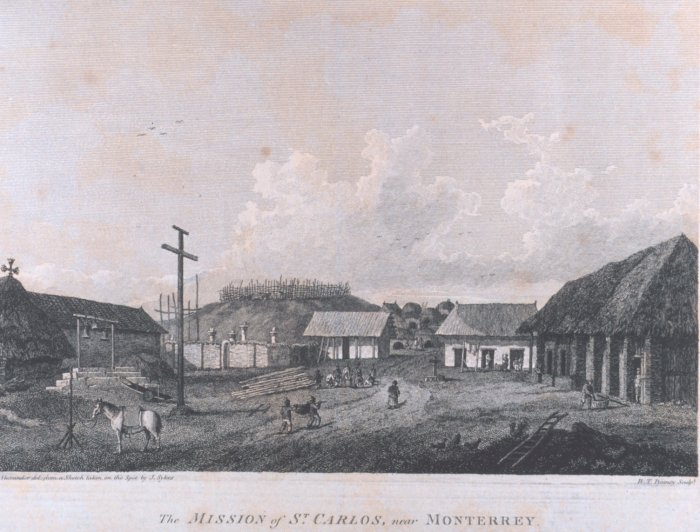
"The Mission of St. Carlos near Monterrey" in 1792, from: "A Voyage of Discovery to the North Pacific Ocean and Round the World" by Captain George Vancouver

Pedro Fages, who served as military governor of Alta California from 1770 to 1774, kept his headquarters in the polity's capitol, at the Presidio of Monterey. Fages worked his men very harshly and was seen as a tyrant. Serra intervened on behalf of Fages' soldiers, and the two men did not get along. Fages regarded the Spanish installations in California as military institutions first, and religious outposts second. Some of the soldiers raped Indigenous women and kept them as concubines. Serra wanted to put some distance between the mission's neophytes and Fages' soldiers.

Serra found that the land at the mouth of the Carmel River, where the Carmel River (named Río del Carmelo by Vizcaíno in 1603) runs into Carmel Bay, was better suited for farming. In May 1771, Spain's viceroy approved Serra's petition to relocate the mission. After the move, "del Rio Carmelo " was added to the mission name. Re-established in the new location on August 1, 1771, the first mass was celebrated on August 24, and Serra officially took up residence in the newly constructed buildings on December 24.

The relocated mission was located within a short distance of the Rumsen Ohlone villages of Tucutnut and Achasta. The latter village may have been founded after the mission was relocated. The mission was about 10 mi (16 km) from the nearest Esselen territory, Excelen. The original building in Monterey continued to operate as the Royal Presidio's chapel and later became the current Cathedral of San Carlos Borromeo.

=== Serra's headquarters ===
The Carmel mission was Serra's favorite and, because it was close to Monterey, the governmental headquarters of Alta California, he chose it as his headquarters. When Serra died on August 28, 1784, he was interred beneath the chapel floor. After Serra's death, his successor Lasuen replaced the adobe structure with one built of stone quarried from the nearby Santa Lucia Mountains.

=== Native Californians ===
==== Baptisms ====
After the mission was moved from Monterey, the Franciscans began to baptize some natives. By the end of 1771, the population of the mission was 15 with an additional 22 baptized Indians, out of a total population of northern California of 60.

Farming was not very productive and for several years the mission was dependent upon the arrival of supply ships. Historian Jame Culleton wrote in 1950, "The summer of '73 came without bringing the supply ship. Neither Carmel nor Monterey was anything like self-supporting."

To improve baptismal rates, they sought to convert key members of the Esselen and Rumsen tribes, including chiefs. On May 9, 1775, Junípero Serra baptized what appears to be the first Esselen, Pach-hepas, the 40-year-old chief of the Excelen. He was near death and was baptized in his home village at Xasáuan, about 10 leagues (about 26 mi (42 km)) southeast of the mission, in an area now named Cachagua, a close approximation of the Esselen name. By 1812, the missions priests identified Native Californians from seven different nations.

==== Labor ====
The Esselen and Ohlone Indians who lived near the mission were baptized and then moved to the mission and became laborers. Over the years about 900 Esselen were baptized and brought to missions in Carmel Valley at, Soledad, and San Antonio, that surrounding their native land. There was extensive "comingling of the Costanoan with peoples of different linguistic and cultural background during the mission period." The neophytes were taught to be farmers, shepherds, cowboys, blacksmiths, carpenters, bricklayers, furniture makers, tanners, weavers and candle makers. Disease, starvation, overwork, and torture decimated these tribes. The number of natives who died at the missions were high. Deaths exceeded births and the population at Mission San Carlos peaked in 1795, when the population reached a total reported variously as either 876 or 927, but by 1823 the total had dwindled to 381.

=== Crops and livestock ===
In the beginning, the mission relied on bear meat from Mission San Antonio de Padua and supplies brought by ship from Mission San Diego de Alcalá. In 1779, four years after the first Esselen baptism, the Native Americans at Carmel mission harvested 1,660 bushels of wheat, 700 bushels of barley, 165 bushels of beans, and 85 bushels of maize. Four years later, the native laborers produced enough crops to support 700 people. The mission had more than 500 cattle and sheep.

Carmel mission continued to grow during the remainder of the 18th century. By 1800, agriculture production at Carmel mission was near its peak. The mission reported to Mexico that it had 2,180 horses and cattle, and 4,160 smaller livestock, including sheep. The total grain harvested was about 3,700 bushels per year with a high of 7,400 in 1797. In December 1832, the mission reported to Mexico that it had 2,100 cattle, 3,300 sheep, 410 horses, and 8 mules.

=== Secularized and abandoned ===
After Mexico became independent, the Mexican government was concerned that the missions remained loyal to the Catholic Church in Spain. In August 1833, the government secularized all of the missions, and their stewardship of huge tracts of grazing land was revoked. The government stipulated that half the mission lands should be awarded to the native people, but this purpose was never accomplished. Most mission property was granted to government officials and/or their wealthy friends. The priests could not maintain the missions without the neophytes' forced labor, and the mission and lands were soon abandoned. The neophytes were forced from the mission by the new landowners. Some attempted to return to their native ways, and others found work as ranch hands or servants on farms and ranches.

By 1850, the mission was nearly a ruin. The stone chapel building was deteriorating while most of the adobe buildings were eroding away. The roof collapsed in 1852.

=== Restoration ===
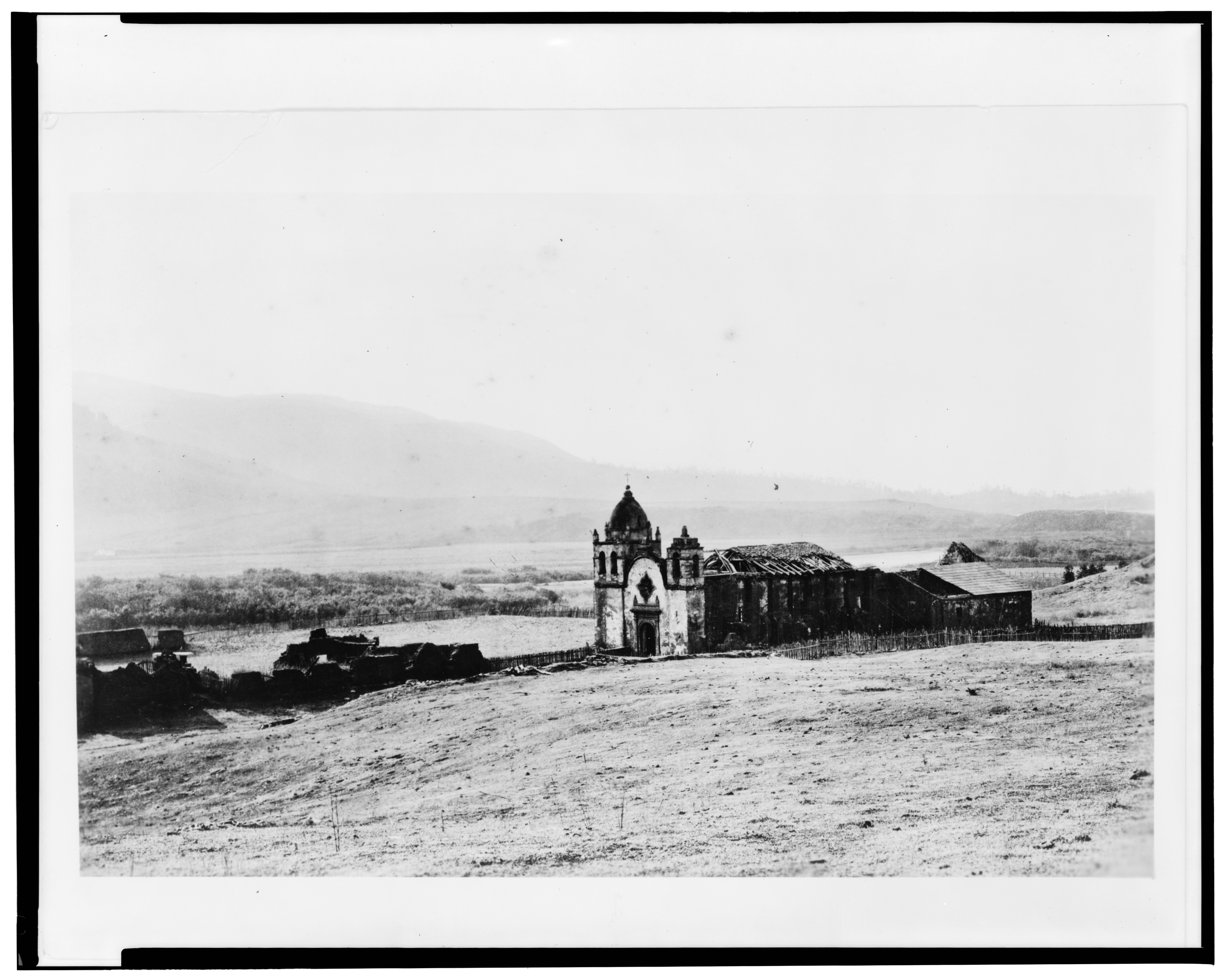
Mission Carmel damaged circa 1860, HABS archive

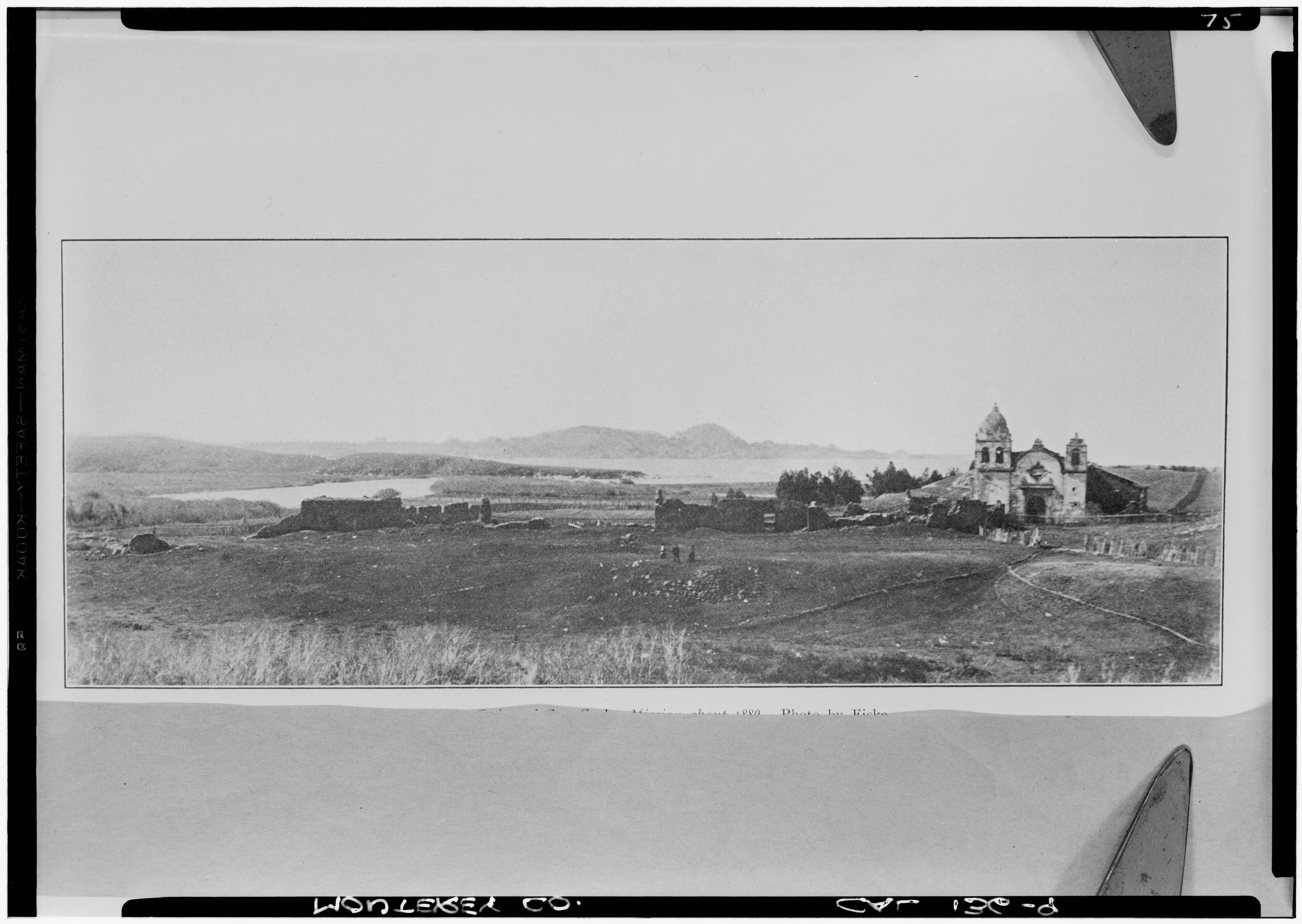
The mission abandoned, 1880

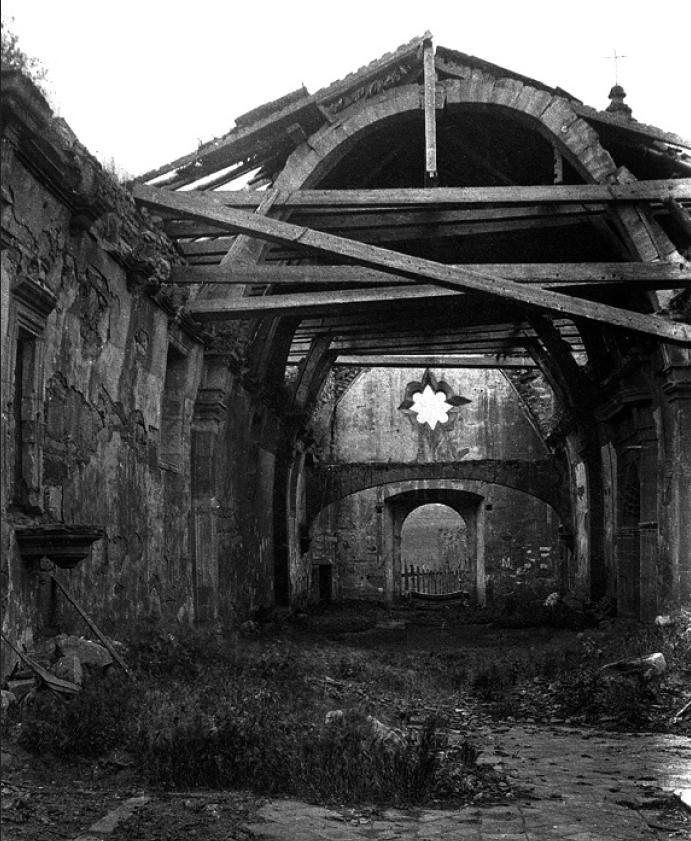
Interior view of the church building and its fallen roof tiles in 1880 prior to restoration

When Mexico ceded California to the United States following the Mexican–American War, the 1848 Treaty of Guadalupe Hidalgo provided that the land grants would be honored, but required that the owners provide legal proof of their title. As required by the Land Act of 1851, Archbishop Joseph Sadoc Alemany filed a claim on February 19, 1853, on behalf of the Roman Catholic Church. He sought return of all former mission lands in the State. The state agreed to return the original mission buildings, cemeteries, and gardens to the church.

When the Roman Catholic Church gained full control of the buildings on October 19, 1859, the mission was in ruins. In 1884, Father Angel Casanova was able to gather enough private funds to replace the roof on the chapel sufficient to preserve it until the 1930s. In 1931 Monsignor Philip Scher hired master cabinet maker Henry John ("Harry") Downie who had an excellent reputation for restoring Spanish antiques. Scher initially asked Downie to restore some statues at the Carmel Mission but his job quickly expanded and he was put in charge of restoring the entire mission. Two years later, the church transferred the mission from the Franciscans to the local diocese and it became a regular parish church. Downie lived nearby in Carmel and worked almost daily for nearly 50 years to restore the mission, ancillary buildings, walls, and grounds. He painstakingly researched the church's architecture and site, often relying on original Spanish sources, and gathered genuine artifacts from across California.

He first restored the padres' quarters, then the roof of the chapel in 1936, and over the next five years the interior of the basilica. In 1941, he oversaw restoration of the former soldiers' quarters on the east side of the quadrangle. In 1943 he began restoration of a building that had been on the south side of the quadrangle, although nothing was left but the eroded adobe foundation and a few ruined walls. The building was originally a segregated, locked dormitory for girls called the monjero (nunnery). They were separated from their families at age 8. The boys and unmarried men also had their own dormitory, though it was less confining.

The building was reconstructed and made into classrooms for Junipero Serra Elementary School. In 1946, the ruin on the east side of the quadrangle that had been the original padre's kitchen and a blacksmith shop was rebuilt. It is used today as a chapel. Downie also consulted on the restoration of the missions that are considered the most authentic, including San Luis Obispo, San Juan Bautista, and San Buenaventura. He also helped the Native Daughters of the Golden West to reconstruct Mission Soledad. He was knighted by Pope Pius and by King Juan Carlos of Spain.

In 1960, the mission was designated as a minor basilica by Pope John XXIII. In 1987, Pope John Paul II visited the mission as part of his U.S. tour.

The original bell nicknamed Ave Maria was made in Mexico City in 1807. It was placed at the Mission in 1820. When the mission was secularized in 1834, the bell was removed and held onto by local Native Americans for safekeeping. It was finally lost, but relocated once again, during restoration. It was re-installed in the mission bell tower in 1925.

== Modern use ==
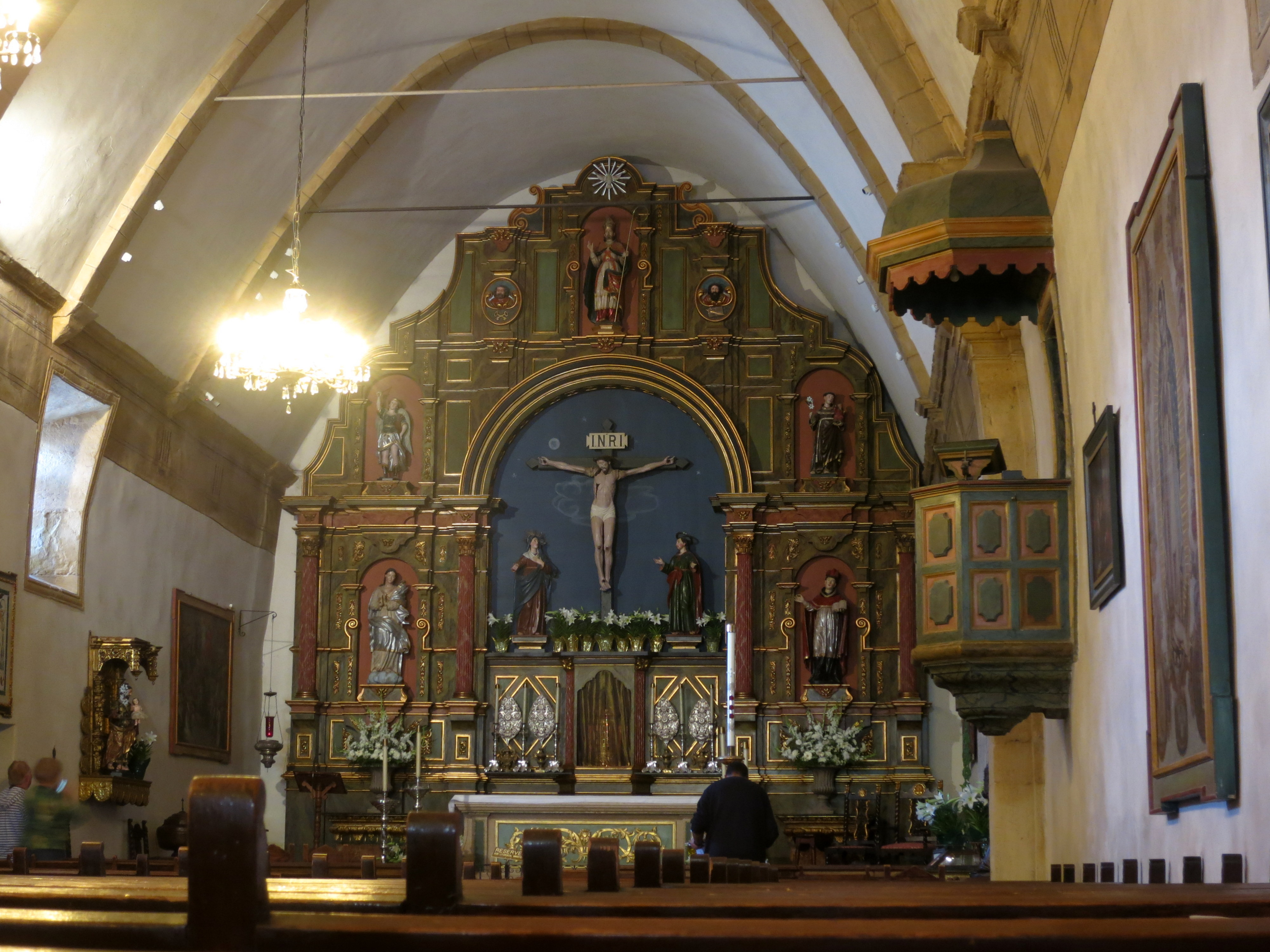
Modern retablo inside basilica

As a result of Downie's dedicated efforts to restore the buildings, the Carmel mission church is one of the most authentically restored of all the mission churches in California. Mission Carmel has been designated a National Historic Landmark by the National Park Service. It is an active parish church of the Roman Catholic Diocese of Monterey.

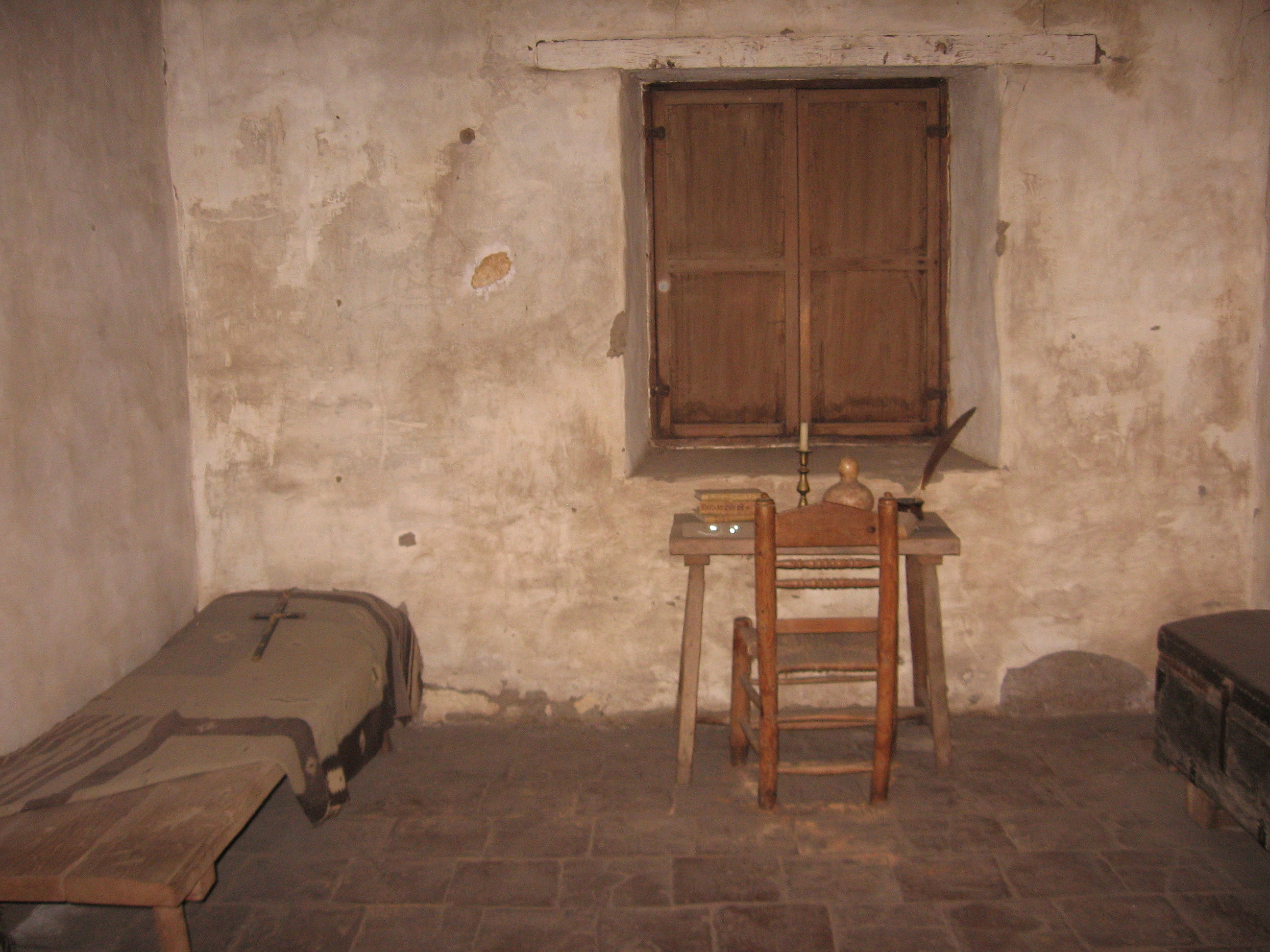
Serra's cell, Carmel Mission

In addition to its activity as a place of worship, Mission Carmel also hosts concerts, art exhibits, lectures, and numerous other community events. In 1986, then-pastor Monsignor Eamon MacMahon acquired a Casavant Frères organ with horizontal trumpets. Its hand-painted casework is decorated with elaborate carvings and statuary reflecting the Spanish decorative style seen on the main altar.

The mission also serves as a museum, preserving its own history and the history of the area. There are four specific museum galleries: the Harry Downie Museum, describing restoration efforts; the Munras Family Heritage Museum, describing the history of one of the most important area families; the Jo Mora Chapel Gallery, hosting rotating art exhibits as well as the monumental bronze and travertine cenotaph (1924) sculpted by Jo Mora; and the Convento Museum, which holds the cell Serra lived and died in, as well as interpretive exhibits. At one end of the museum is a special chapel room containing some of the vestments used by Serra.

The mission grounds were also the location of the Junípero Serra School, a private Catholic school for kindergarteners through 8th grade operated by the Diocese of Monterey. The school opened in 1943 and closed at the end of the 2019–2020 school year.

=== Modern restoration ===
Between 2000 and 2007, private funding provided funds to hire Fine Art Conservation Laboratories to conserve the major original Spanish Colonial oil paintings in the nave. The company had previously been responsible for the preservation and restoration of Spanish colonial art from the Mission Inn, Riverside, California, the Santa Barbara Mission, The Institute of Iberian Art in Santa Fe, New Mexico, and from the Permanent Art Collection of Brigham Young University. The most important artwork conserved during their initial work was the Deposition, a painting commissioned by Father Serra prior to his death. It now hangs in the vicinity of his tomb in the apse of the Carmel Mission.

In 2008, the non-profit Friends of Historic Carmel Mission was formed, independent of the Diocese of Monterey. The organization's goal was to assist the parish and diocese in restoring and preserving the historic landmark. After restoring nine mission bells and many artifacts, the Foundation became the sole funder for the restoration and changed its name to the Carmel Mission Foundation.

In 2012, the foundation began a $6.2 million capital project to restore the Basilica which had not been touched since 1937 and had been deemed unsafe by the California State Unreinforced Masonry Act. The project was the third major reconstruction of the Basilica since it was built in 1797. The contractors installed additional wood and steel beams to reinforce and tie the roof structure together. To strengthen the walls, they drilled over 300 center-cored vertical and horizontal holes in the 5 ft (1.5 m) thick walls, into which they inserted steel rods that were grouted in place. The bell tower dome was reinforced, cleaned and resurfaced.

The project also updated the electrical system and added a fire suppression system. The interior lighting was replaced, and custom-made chandeliers were added. Foundation issues were remedied and all tile was matched and restored. The project upgraded the radiant heating system and included construction of an Americans with Disabilities Act-compliant restroom. The Basilica restoration was completed in 2013. Over the next few years, the foundation funded restoration of many artifacts in the museum and to preserve historic structures from further decay. This included the Muchado House built in 1883.

In 2016, the Foundation funded the restoration of the central courtyard at a cost of $2.2 million. The unsafe, cracked concrete surface was removed and new water and fire lines, drains, sewer, electrical, and communications lines were installed before a more durable concrete surface was poured to match that of the original aggregate poured in the late 1960s.

The courtyard fountain was restored. The large Santa Maria style barbecue pits that have been used for community barbecues since 1913 were reinforced and upgraded. The gardens were replanted with native plants and outdoor lighting and electrical was installed. The foundation also created the Serra Memorial Circle in the Courtyard to honor donors.

The foundation worked with the Mission Docent Association to conserve the Our Lady of Bethlehem statue, believed to be one of the oldest statues in California. In 2020, the front perimeter wall deteriorated. The foundation paid for emergency removal of the 30 feet (9.1 m) long perimeter wall and construction of a temporary wall until a permanent one can be designed and built.

In late 2020, The Carmel Mission Foundation began a $4 million project to restore and seismically strengthen the century old Downie Museum in time to commemorate the 250th anniversary of the founding of Carmel Mission. The restoration removed restrooms from the rear of the building, doubling the museum's interior space. Paint covering the stone installed in 1920 surrounding the fireplace was removed.

The foundation is seeking additional funding to pay for seismic retrofits, infrastructure improvements, and restoration of the Mora Museum, Convento Museum, Blessed Sacrament Chapel, and the historic Orchard House Property.

== Folklore ==
The Lost Padre Mines of the Carmel Mission have woven themselves into the tapestry of local folklore, with their legacy recounted through various accounts, including those within Randall Reinstadt's notable works such as Ghosts, Bandits, and Legends of Old Monterey, Carmel and Surrounding Areas and Tales and Treasures of California Missions. These narratives unveil a captivating history, suggesting that indigenous communities held knowledge of abundant gold deposits concealed within the untamed terrain of the Santa Lucia Mountains. As whispers of these riches echoed through time, the enigmatic Lost Padre Mines became a testament to the allure of hidden treasures and the enduring mystique of the land. Numerous iterations of these legends appear to have originated from long-time residents of Carmel Valley. It is plausible that this phenomenon can be attributed to some of the final descendants of the Mission Indians who resided and labored in the area.

=== Vandalism ===
On September 27, 2015, in response to Serra's canonization, the San Carlos Borromeo de Carmelo Mission was vandalized. The statue of Serra was toppled and splattered with paint, and the cemetery, the mission doors, a fountain, and a crucifix were as well. The message "Saint of Genocide" was painted on the ground, and similar messages were painted elsewhere in the mission courtyard.

== Notable interments ==
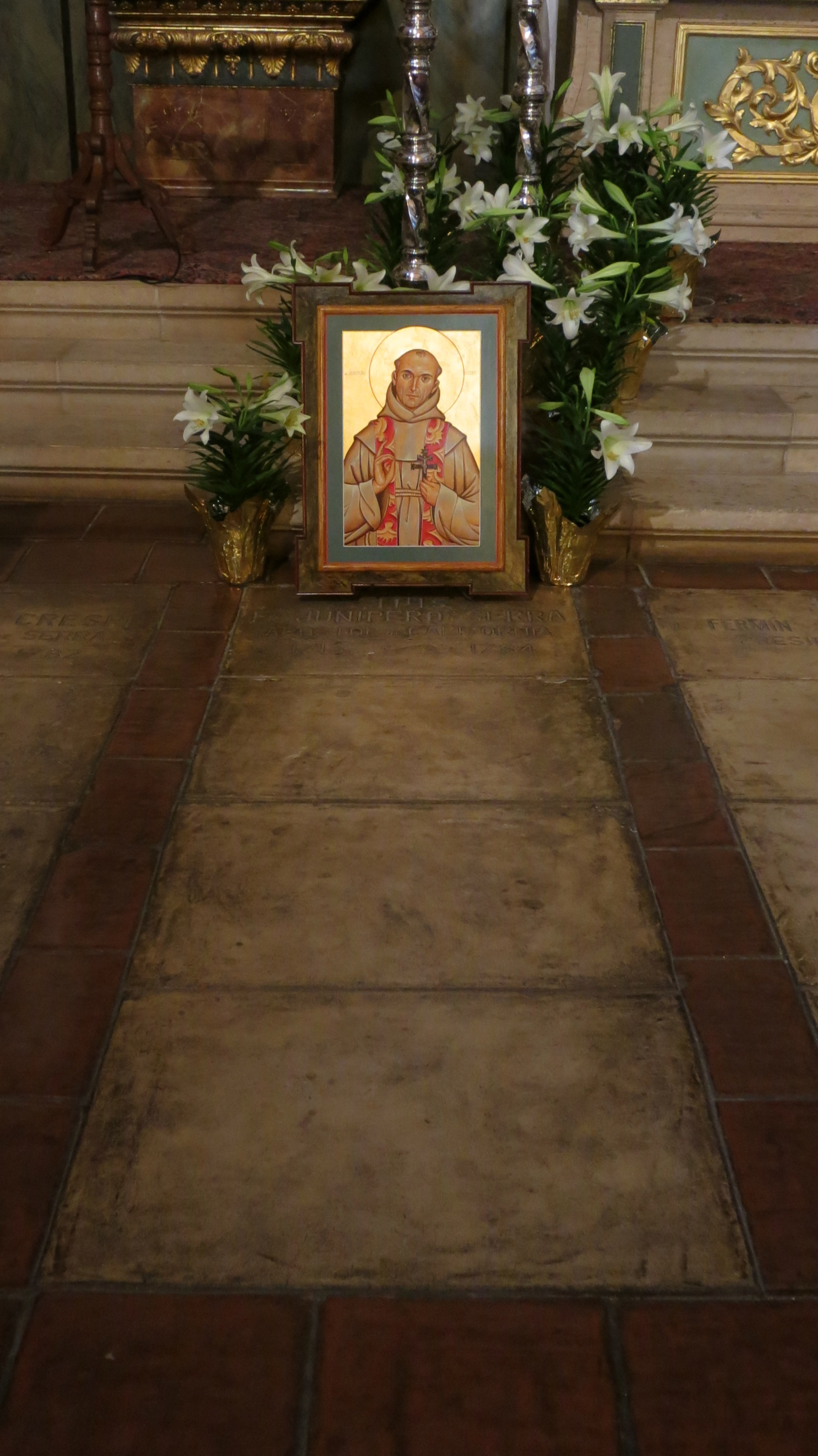
St. Junípero Serra's grave inside the church

Several notable people are buried in the church and churchyard, in the Carmel Mission Cemetery, also known as Mission Carmel Cemetery, and Mission San Carlos Borromeo de Carmelo Cemetery.

- Juan Crespí (1721–1782), Spanish missionary and explorer
- Fermín Lasuén (1736–1803), Spanish missionary and explorer
- José Antonio Roméu, (1742? – 1792) Spanish governor of California
- Junípero Serra (1713–1784), founder of the Spanish missions in California and Saint

== See also ==
- Spanish missions in California
- List of Spanish missions in California
- Cathedral of San Carlos Borroméo (aka Royal Presidio Chapel), Monterey, California
- USNS Mission Carmel (AO-113), a Buenaventura Class fleet oiler built during World War II.
- USNS Mission San Carlos (AO-120), a Buenaventura Class fleet oiler built during World War II.
