= USNS Mission San Fernando =

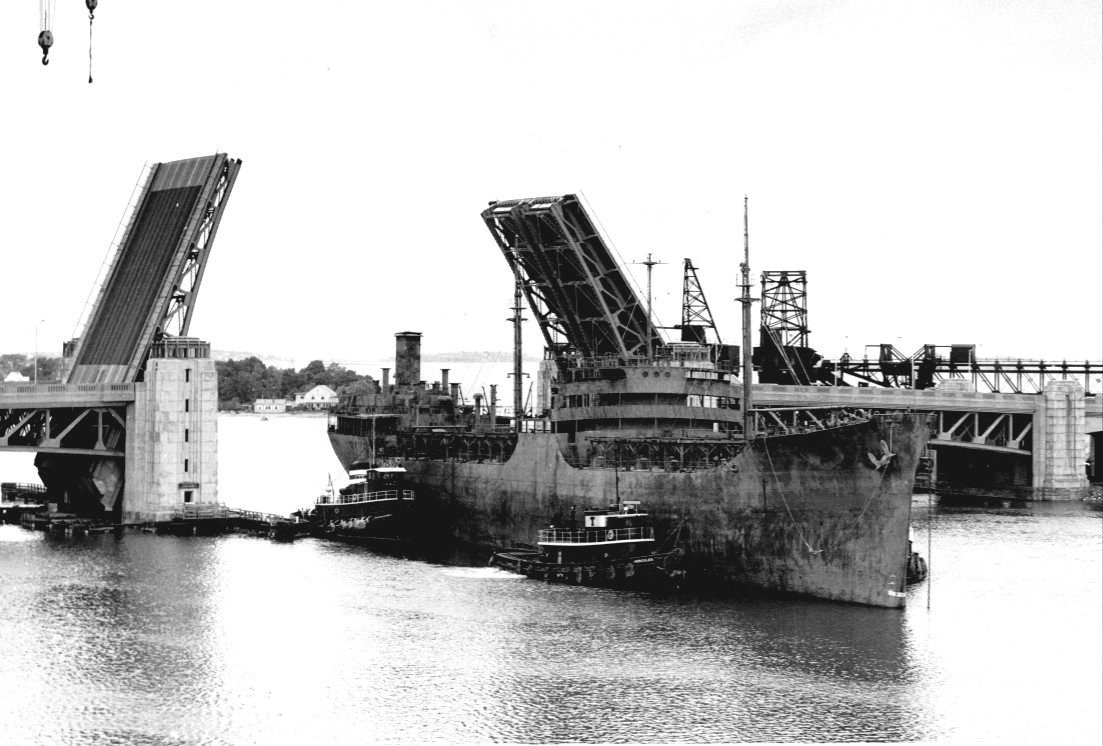
- USNS Mission San Fernando

History

United States
- Name: Mission San Fernando
- Namesake: Mission San Fernando
- Owner: Naval Overseas Transportation Service (NOTS)
- Operator: Pacific Tankers, Inc.
- Builder: Marinship Corporation, Sausalito, California
- Laid down: 26 August 1943
- Launched: 25 November 1943
- In service: 29 February 1944
- Out of service: 10 May 1946
- Fate: Transferred to the US Navy, 21 October 1947

United States
- Name: Mission San Fernando
- Owner: NOTS (21 October 1947 – 1 October 1949); Military Sea Transportation Service (MSTS) (1 October 1949–)
- Operator: Union Oil Co.
- Acquired: 21 October 1947
- Out of service: 24 May 1955
- Stricken: 22 June 1955
- Identification: Hull symbol: T-AO-122
- Fate: Reacquired by the Navy, 21 June 1956

United States
- Name: Mission San Fernando
- Owner: MSTS
- Operator: Marine Transportation Lines
- Acquired: 21 June 1956
- In service: 21 June 1956
- Out of service: 4 September 1957
- Identification: Hull symbol: T-AO-122
- Fate: Reacquired by the Navy, 28 September 1964

United States
- Name: Muscle Shoals (1964–1965); Vanguard (1965–)
- Namesake: Muscle Shoals, Alabama; Project Vanguard
- Owner: Military Sea Transportation Service
- Acquired: 28 September 1964
- In service: 28 February 1966
- Renamed: Vanguard, 1 September 1965
- Reclassified: Missile Range Instrumentation Ship (AGM); Navigational Test Launch Ship (AG) (September 1980)
- Stricken: 13 December 1999
- Identification: Hull symbol: T-AGM-19; T-AG-194; IMO number: 8835607
- Fate: Scrapped, 5 November 2013

General characteristics
- Class & type: Mission Buenaventura-class oiler
- Displacement: 5,532 long tons (5,621 t) light; 21,880 long tons (22,231 t) full
- Length: 524 ft (160 m)
- Beam: 68 ft (21 m)
- Draft: 30 ft (9.1 m)
- Propulsion: Turbo-electric, single screw, 6,000 hp (4.47 MW)
- Speed: 16.5 knots (30.6 km/h; 19.0 mph)
- Complement: 52
- Armament: None

SS Mission San Fernando was a Type T2-SE-A2 tanker built for the United States Maritime Commission during World War II. After the war she was acquired by the United States Navy as USS Mission San Fernando (AO-122). Later the tanker transferred to the Military Sea Transportation Service as USNS Mission San Fernando (T-AO-122). She was a member of the Mission Buenaventura-class oiler and was named for Mission San Fernando Rey de España in Los Angeles. She was later renamed USNS Muscle Shoals (T-AGM-19) (after Muscle Shoals, Alabama), and, later, USNS Vanguard (T-AG-194).

== Service history ==
=== As oiler, 1943–1957 ===
Mission San Fernando was laid down on 26 August 1943 under a Maritime Commission contract by Marine Ship Corporation, Sausalito, California; launched on 25 November 1943; sponsored by Mrs. Ruth B. Krohn; and delivered on 29 February 1944. Chartered to Pacific Tankers Inc., for operations, she served the remainder of the War carrying fuel to Allied forces in the western Pacific (during which time she was twice awarded the Battle Efficiency Award as well as the National Defense Service Medal). She remained in service until 10 May 1946 when she was returned to the Maritime Commission and laid up in the Reserve Fleet at Olympia, Washington.

Acquired by the Navy on 21 October 1947 she was chartered to the Union Oil Company for operations and placed in service under the operational control of the Naval Transportation Service as Mission San Fernando (AO-122). Transferred to the operational control of the newly created Military Sea Transportation Service on 1 October 1949 she was redesignated USNS Mission San Fernando (T-AO-122). She served in MSTS until 24 May 1955 when she was returned to the Maritime Administration and laid up in the Maritime Reserve Fleet at Olympia. She was struck from the Naval Vessel Register on 22 June 1955.

Reacquired by the Navy on 21 June 1956 she was placed in service with MSTS and operated, under charter, by Marine Transportation Lines. She served with MSTS until she was returned to the Maritime Administration on 4 September 1957 and laid up in the Maritime Reserve Fleet at James River, Virginia.

=== As tracking and navigational test ship, 1964–1999 ===
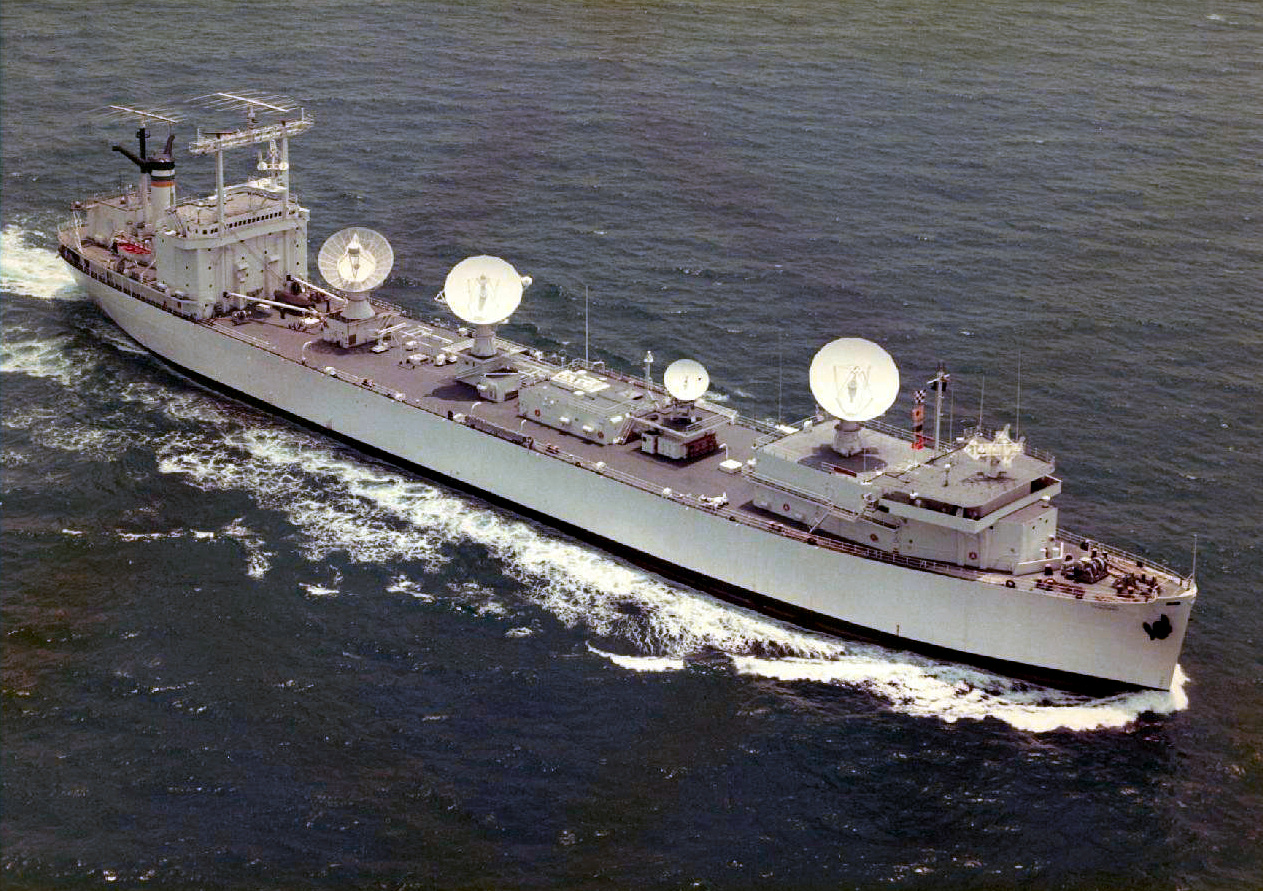
Vanguard (T-AGM-19) seen here as a NASA Skylab tracking ship. Note the SatCom tracking radar and telemetry antennas.

Reacquired by the Navy on 28 September 1964 she was taken in hand by General Dynamics Quincy Shipbuilding Division for extensive modernization and rebuilding at its Quincy, Massachusetts yard. This included adding 80 ft (24.4 m) to her length. While under conversion to a missile-range instrumentation ship, she was renamed for Muscle Shoals, Alabama, and reclassified, becoming Muscle Shoals (AGM-19). Renamed Vanguard on 1 September 1965, she was placed in service with MSTS on 28 February 1966 as USNS Vanguard (T-AGM-19). Designed to be a seagoing missile tracking station, she participated in the Apollo Project test series and into 1969 had continued in these duties. She then participated in the Skylab program and the joint US/Soviet Apollo–Soyuz Test Project.

In September 1980, she was reconfigured and the large missile tracking antennas were removed. She replaced the USS Compass Island and reclassified as T-AG-194. Her role became that of a Navigational Test Ship and she was used to check submarine navigation systems. She steamed over 250,000 miles in support of Poseidon and Trident I navigation subsystems and in development of the Trident II navigation subsystem. She was stricken again on 12 December 1999 after being replaced by USNS Waters (T-AGS-45).

=== Disposal ===
On 29 November 2001 she was transferred to the United States Maritime Administration (MARAD). On 16 March 2005 MARAD issued a "Request for Comments" for public input on the historical significance of the Vanguard.

Following historical review, the vessel was cleared for disposal by the Virginia State Historic Preservation Office on 15 November 2006.

The ship was scrapped on 5 November 2013 at Marine Metal Inc. recycle slip in Brownsville, Texas.

== Gallery ==
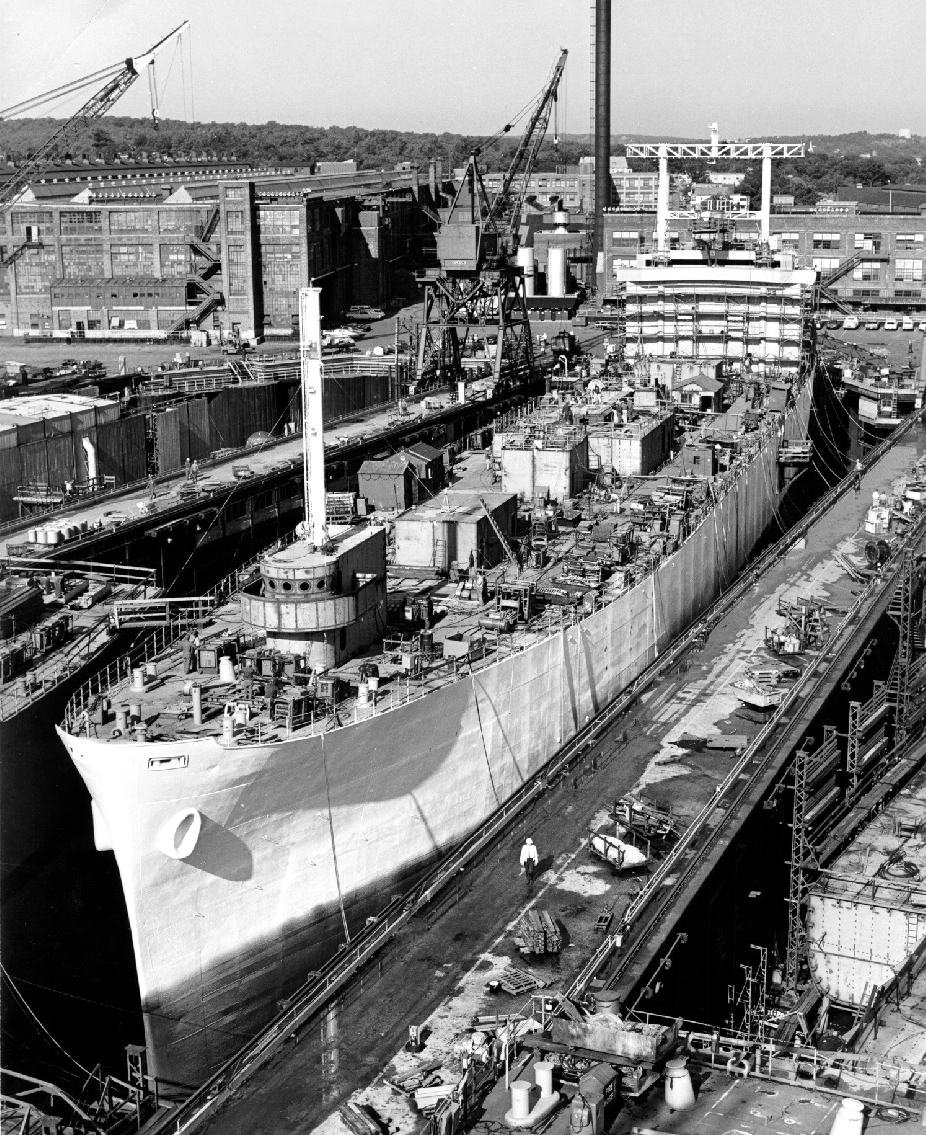
Muscle Shoals (AGM-19) nearing completion, in dry dock at Quincy.
