= USNS Mission Santa Ana =

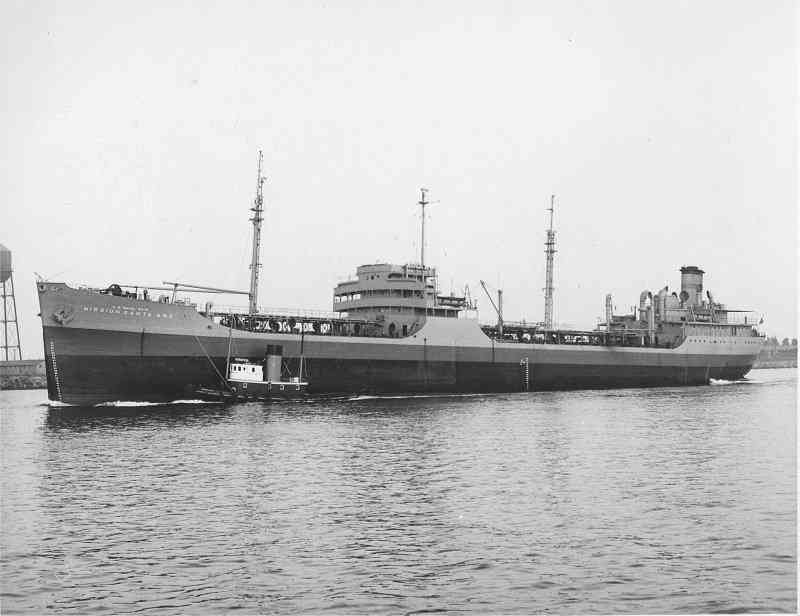
- USNS Mission Santa Ana (T-AO-137) getting underway in Long Beach, California, date unknown

History

United States
- Name: Mission Santa Ana
- Builder: Marinship Corporation, Sausalito, California
- Laid down: 18 April 1945
- Launched: 25 July 1945
- Acquired: 25 October 1945
- Stricken: 22 June 1955
- Identification: IMO number: 6912217
- Fate: Scrapped December 1975

General characteristics
- Class & type: Mission Buenaventura-class oiler
- Displacement: 5,532 long tons (5,621 t) light; 21,880 long tons (22,231 t) full
- Length: 524 ft (160 m)
- Beam: 68 ft (21 m)
- Draft: 30 ft (9.1 m)
- Propulsion: Turbo-electric, single screw, 6,000 hp (4.47 MW)
- Speed: 16.5 knots (30.6 km/h; 19.0 mph)
- Complement: 52
- Armament: None

USNS Mission Santa Ana (T-AO-137) was a Mission Buenaventura-class oiler that served in the United States Navy. The ship was originally intended as USS Concho (AO-102) for the U.S. Navy but her acquisition was canceled. The ship, a Type T2-SE-A3 tanker, was completed as SS Mission Santa Ana and delivered after the end of World War II. The tanker was acquired by the U.S. Navy in 1948 as USS Mission Santa Ana (AO-137), but was transferred to the Military Sea Transport Service upon its creation in 1949. The ship was named for the Santa Ana Estancia (a station of Mission San Juan Capistrano, one of the twenty-one California missions), she was the only U.S. Naval Vessel to bear the name.

== Career ==
Originally laid down as Concho on 18 April 1945 as a Maritime Commission type (T2-SE-A3) tanker hull under Maritime Commission contract (MC hull 1828) by Marinship Corporation of Sausalito, California; launched on 25 July 1945, sponsored by Mrs. D. J. Johnson; and delivered on 25 October 1945.

Chartered to Pacific Tankers Inc. for operations, she carried fuel to American forces stationed overseas (during which time she was awarded the National Defense Service Medal) until 3 April 1946 when she was returned to the Maritime Commission and laid up in the Maritime Reserve Fleet at Columbia River, Oregon.

Acquired by the Navy on 9 January 1948 and chartered to Pacific Tankers Inc. for operations, she was placed in service with the Naval Transportation Service as Mission Santa Ana (AO‑137). Taken over by the Military Sea Transportation Service when it absorbed the functions and duties of the Naval Transportation Service on 1 October 1949 her designation was changed to USNS Mission Santa Ana (T‑AO‑137). She served with MSTS until 3 April 1950 when she was taken out of service and berthed in the San Diego group of the Pacific Reserve Fleet. She lay at San Diego, California in reserve until 27 January 1955 when she was transferred to the Maritime Administration (MARAD) and laid up in the Maritime Reserve Fleet at Olympia, Washington. She was struck from the Naval Vessel Register on 22 June 1955.

Reacquired by the Navy on 3 July 1956 she was once again placed in service with MSTS and operated, under charter, by Joshua Henry Corporation. She served with MSTS until 25 February 1958 when she was again struck from the Naval Vessel Register and transferred to the Maritime Administration for layup in the Maritime Reserve Fleet at Suisun Bay, where she remained into 1969.

The ship was scrapped in December 1975.
