= INS Vinash (K85) =

History

Indian Navy
- Name: INS Vinash
- Commissioned: 20 January 1971
- Decommissioned: 15 January 1990
- Honours and awards: Karachi, 1971

General characteristics
- Class & type: Vidyut-class missile boat
- Displacement: 245 tons (full load)
- Length: 38.6 meters
- Beam: 7.6 meters
- Speed: 37+ knots
- Complement: 30
- Armament: 4 × SS-N-2A Styx AShM; 2 × AK-230 30mm guns

INS Vinash (K85) (Destruction) was a Vidyut-class missile boat of the 25th Killer Missile Boat Squadron of the Indian Navy.

== Operation Python ==
During the Indo-Pakistani War of 1971, Vinash was a part of the Operation Python strike force along with INS Talwar and INS Trishul. The strike force approached Karachi on 8 December 1971 in rough seas.

Vinash fired 4 SS-N-2B Styx missiles at various targets. The first missile struck the fuel tanks at Keamari Oil Farm. Another missile hit and sunk Panamian fuel tanker SS Gulf Star. The third and fourth missiles hit the Pakistan Navy fleet tanker PNS Dacca and the British merchant ship SS Harmattan, which were badly damaged.

Operation Python and its preceding Operation Trident were successful. The Pakistani fuel reserves for the Karachi sector were destroyed and flames could be seen from 60 miles away. India established complete control over the oil route from the Persian Gulf to Pakistani ports. Shipping traffic to and from Karachi, Pakistan's only major port at that time, ceased.

Lt. Cdr. Vijai Jerath, commanding officer of INS Vinash was awarded the Vir Chakra for the operation.
