= USNS Mission Santa Clara =

United States Maritime Commission Tanker

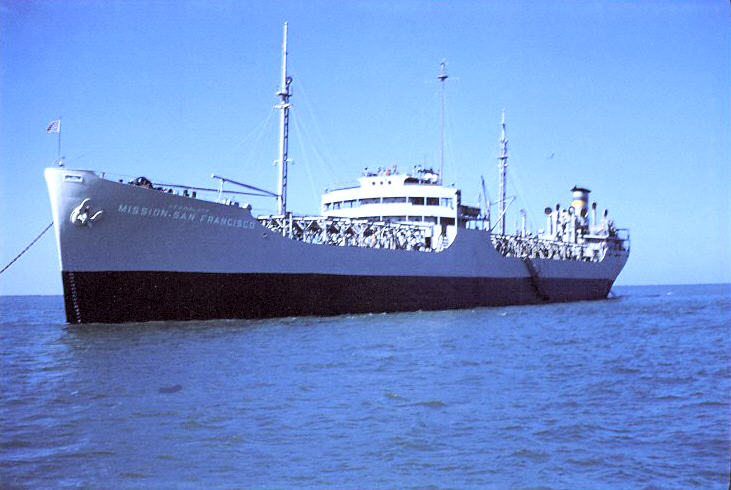
- Sister ship USNS Mission San Francisco

History

United States
- Name: Mission Santa Clara
- Laid down: 15 March 1944
- Launched: 18 May 1944
- Acquired: 5 November 1947
- In service: 5 November 1947
- Out of service: 22 December 1959
- Stricken: 1 July 1961
- Fate: Transferred to Pakistan, 17 January 1963

Pakistan
- Name: Dacca
- Acquired: 17 January 1963
- Commissioned: 17 January 1963

General characteristics
- Displacement: 21,880 tons full; 5,532 tons light
- Length: 524 ft (160 m)
- Beam: 68 ft (21 m)
- Draft: 30 ft (9 m)
- Propulsion: Turbo-electric, single screw, 6,000 hp (4.5 MW)
- Speed: 16.5 knots (31 km/h)
- Complement: 52 mariners

SS Mission Santa Clara was a Type T2-SE-A2 tanker built for the United States Maritime Commission during World War II. After the war she was acquired by the United States Navy as USS Mission Santa Clara (AO-132). Later the tanker transferred to the Military Sea Transportation Service as USNS Mission Santa Clara (T-AO-132). She was a Mission Buenaventura-class oiler and was named for Mission Santa Clara de Asís in Santa Clara, California.

== Career ==
Mission Santa Clara was laid down 15 March 1944 under a Maritime Commission contract by Marine Ship Corporation, Sausalito, California; launched 18 May 1944; sponsored by Mrs. Donald E. Reed; and delivered 21 June 1944. Chartered to Los Angeles Tanker Operators, Inc. for operations, she spent the remainder of the War carrying fuel to Allied forces in the western Pacific. She remained in this capacity until 8 April 1946 when she was returned to the Maritime Commission and laid up in the Maritime Reserve Fleet at Mobile, Alabama.

Acquired by the Navy 5 November 1947 she was chartered to Pacific Tankers, Inc. for operations and placed under the operational control of the Naval Transportation Service as Mission Santa Clara (AO-132). Taken over by the Military Sea Transportation Service 1 October 1949 and designated USNS Mission Santa Clara (T-AO-132), she served until 25 June 1959 when she was transferred to the Maritime Administration and laid up in the Maritime Reserve Fleet at Suisun Bay, California.

Reacquired by the Navy 30 November 1959 she was placed in service with MSTS and chartered to Mathiasens Tanker Industries, Inc. for operations. However, she served less than a month for on 22 December 1959 she was transferred to MARAD and laid up in the Maritime Reserve Fleet at Suisun Bay. Her name was struck from the Naval Vessel Register on 1 July 1961. Reacquired by the Navy 10 May 1962 the Mission Santa Clara was converted to an underway replenishment oiler. Upon completion of the conversion she was transferred to Pakistan on 17 January 1963.

During her active military service she was awarded the National Defense Service Medal, the Korean Service Medal (four times), the United Nations Service Medal and the Republic of Korea War Service Medal (retroactively).

== Pakistan service ==
On completion of her conversion she was transferred to Pakistan and commissioned as PNS Dacca (A-41). Into 1969, she continued to serve the Pakistani Navy.

Dacca was damaged beyond repair on Operation Python conducted by the Indian Navy on 8/9 December 1971.
