= Bahadur Nariman Kavina =

- Born: 1 March 1937; Bhusawal, Maharashtra, British India
- Died: 30 June 2017 (aged 80); Adelaide, Australia
- Spouse: Farida
- Military career
- Allegiance: India
- Branch: Indian Navy
- Rank: commanding officer
- Nickname: BN Kavina
- Commands: INS Nipat
- Conflicts: Indo-Pakistani War of 1971
- Awards: Vir Chakra; Maharashtra Puraskar award

Lt. Com. Bahadur Nariman Kavina VrC (Marathi: बहादुर नरिमन कविना; 1 March 1937 – 30 June 2017) was a prominent Indian naval officer, who was commanding officer of the INS Nipat. During the Indo-Pakistani War of 1971, Kavina was the chief architect of attack on the Port of Karachi and led the successful attack on Pakistani Navy headquarters.

== Early life and education ==
B. N. Kavina was born to a Parsi family in Bhusawal, Maharashtra in British India. His father was Nariman and mother Tehmina. He was educated in Bhusawal and Boys' Town, Nashik, where he repeatedly ran away despite being dutifully returned to school each time. He then attended Jai Hind College in Bombay, where he studied science.

== Career ==
Kavina first joined the National Cadet Corps as a naval cadet. After graduating from Jai Hind, he attended the National Defence Academy in Pune, and officially joined the Indian Navy in 1965. That same year, during the Indian–Pakistani conflict, he participated in patrols along the Gujarat border. In 1969, Kavina was sent to the Soviet Union for specialised training on missile boats.

In the 1971 war, the Indian Navy introduced a new missile boat to carry out their activities. Its overall relationship with the overall considerations and wartime costs continued. Such operations were successfully conducted in the presence of the INS Vikrant in the Andaman Islands. The Soviet-made Indian Navy's missile warriors interacted with each other and proceeded to attack the missile and confuse the Pakistani Navy.

The 25th Missile Squadron was formed in a joint operation of the three Vidyut-class missile boats: INS Nipat, INS Nirghat and INS Veer — in the operational code name Operation Trident in the Pakistan-India war of 1971. After the destruction of the ships PNS Khaibar, MV Venus Challenger, PNS Shah Jahan and PNS Muhafiz, the Indian carrier took a distance of 26 km (16 mi) away from the port of Karachi, where located Pakistan Navy's headquarters. When the oil tanker and refinery in the rudder mode of the inspection, the Nipat took two stages proceedings. After striking oil tanker and refinery, the Trident operation went on to Bombay completely with full confidence. Since then, 4 December is celebrated as a Navy day in India.

== Achievements ==
After successfully completing the operations they were fully recognized. Then Fleet Operations Officer Captain and later Vice Admiral Gulab Mohanlal Hiranandani were awarded the Nao Sena Medal for the detailed operational planning; the Maha Vir Chakra was awarded to the strike group commander, Yadav, for planning and leading the task force; and Vir Chakras were awarded to Lieutenant Commanders Bahadur Nariman Kavina, Inderjit Sharma, and Om Prakash Mehta, the commanding officers of INS Nipat, INS Nirghat, and INS Veer respectively. Master Chief M. N. Sangal of INS Nirghat was also awarded the Vir Chakra.

He died on 30 June 2017, in Adelaide, Australia, where he had been staying with his son, Carl.
