= Kasargod Patnashetti Gopal Rao =

Indian Navy Officer (1926–2021)

Commodore Kasargod Patnashetti Gopal Rao MVC, VSM
- Born: 13 November 1926; Mangalore, South Canara, Madras Presidency, British Raj (present-day Karnataka)
- Died: 9 August 2021 (aged 94); Chennai, Tamil Nadu, India
- Military career
- Allegiance: India
- Branch: Indian Navy
- Rank: Commodore
- Unit: Western Fleet (India)
- Commands: INS Chilka; INS Kiltan
- Conflicts: Indo-Pakistani War of 1971 Operation Trident (1971)
- Awards: Maha Vir Chakra; Vishisht Seva Medal

Commodore Kasargod Patnashetti Gopal Rao MVC, VSM (13 November 1926 – 9 August 2021) was an officer in the Indian Navy notable for his participation in the Indo-Pakistani War of 1971 and was awarded the Maha Vir Chakra for his outstanding contributions during Operation Trident.

== Early life ==
Commodore K. P. Gopal Rao was born in a Goud Saraswat brahmin familyMangalore on 13 November 1926. His father's name was Rai Bahadur K.P.Janardhan Rao. His elder brother, Maj. K.P.S. Rao had also served in the Indian Armed Forces, in the Indian Army during the Second World War.

== Military career ==
Commodore K. P. Gopal Rao was commissioned into the Indian Navy on 21 April 1950. In January 1971, he was awarded the Vishisht Seva Medal for distinguished service of a high order.

During the 1971 war, he was commander of two Arnala-class anti-submarine corvettes INS Kiltan and INS Katchall that were part of the task group that attacked Karachi Harbour on 4 December 1971 during Operation Trident. The two corvettes were tasked to provide communications and conduct target acquisition with their superior radar as well as give anti-submarine cover. Operation Trident was a huge success and resulted in sinking two Pakistani destroyers (PNS Khaiber and PNS Shah Jehan), one minesweeper (PNS Muhafiz), one cargo ship (MV Venus Challenger) and setting afire oil dumps and other installations. For his outstanding performance, he was awarded the Maha Vir Chakra, India's second highest military decoration.

== Personal life ==
Rao was married and had two daughters and a Son who currently reside in Chennai. He is from the Goud Saraswat Brahmin (GSB) Community. He died on August 9, 2021, in the southern Indian city of Chennai. He was aged 94.

== See also ==
- Indo-Pakistani War of 1971
- Operation Trident (1971)
- Operation Python
