= INS Nipat =

The following ships of the Indian Navy have been named INS Nipat:

- INS Nipat (K86) was a Vidyut-class missile boat of the Indian Navy which served in the Indo-Pakistani War of 1971
- INS Nipat (K42) is a Veer-class corvette, currently in active service with the Indian Navy
