= INS Veer =

The following ships of the Indian Navy have been named INS Veer:

- INS Veer (K82) was a Vidyut-class missile boat of the Indian Navy which served in the Indo-Pakistani War of 1971
- INS Veer (K40) is the lead vessel of her class of corvettes, currently in active service with the Indian Navy
