= INS Nirbhik =

The following ships of the Indian Navy have been named INS Nirbhik:

- INS Nirbhik (K88) was a Vidyut-class missile boat of the Indian Navy which served in the Indo-Pakistani War of 1971
- INS Nirbhik (K41) is a Veer-class corvette, currently in active service with the Indian Navy
