= HMS Charity (R29) =

C-class destroyer

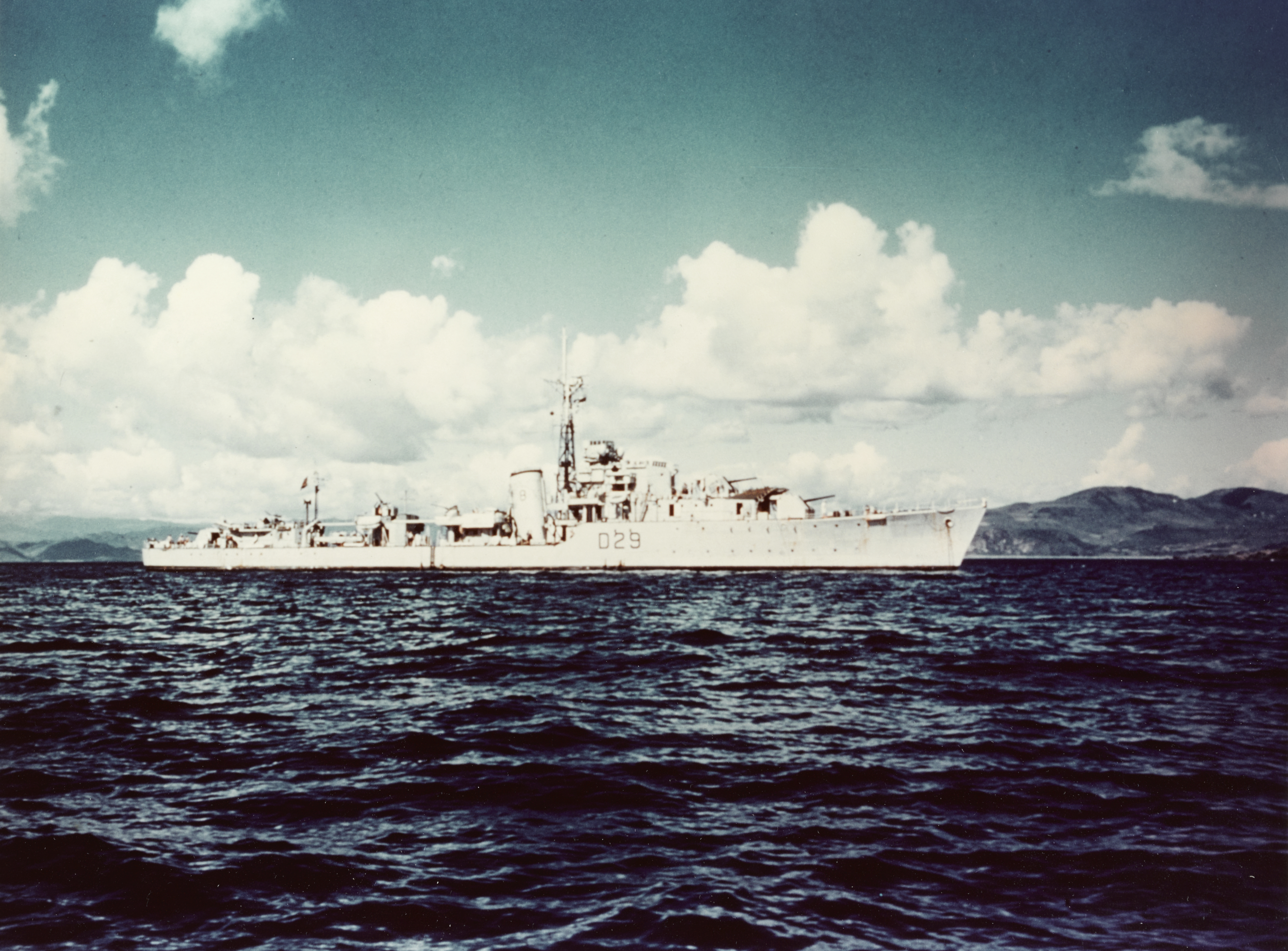
- HMS Charity engaged in Operation Fishnet off North Korea, 16 September 1952.

History

United Kingdom
- Name: HMS Charity
- Builder: John I. Thornycroft and Company and Company, Woolston, Southampton
- Laid down: 9 July 1943
- Launched: 30 November 1944
- Commissioned: 19 November 1945
- Out of service: 16 June 1958
- Identification: Pennant number: R29, changed to D29
- Honours and awards: Korean War
- Fate: Sold to US Navy for later sale to the Pakistan Navy

Pakistan
- Name: PNS Shah Jahan
- Commissioned: 16 December 1958
- Home port: Karachi
- Identification: Pennant number: DD-962
- Honours and awards: Indo-Pakistan War of 1971
- Fate: Damaged by SS-N-2 missile and scrapped

General characteristics
- Class & type: C-class destroyer
- Displacement: 1,710 tons (standard) 2,520 tons (full)
- Length: 363 ft (111 m) o/a
- Beam: 35.75 ft (10.90 m)
- Draught: 10 ft (3.0 m) light; 14.5 ft (4.4 m) full
- Propulsion: 2 Admiralty 3-drum boilers, Parsons geared steam turbines, 40,000 shp (30,000 kW), 2 shafts
- Speed: 37 knots (69 km/h)
- Range: 615 tons oil, 1,400 nautical miles (2,600 km) at 32 knots (59 km/h)
- Complement: 186
- Armament: 4 × QF 4.5 in (114 mm) L/45 guns Mark IV on mounts CP Mk.V; 2 × Bofors 40 mm L/60 guns on twin mount "Hazemeyer" Mk.IV; 4 × anti-aircraft mountings; Bofors 40 mm, single mount Mk.III; QF 2-pdr Mk VIII, single mount Mk.XVI; Oerlikon 20 mm, single mount P Mk.III; Oerlikon 20 mm, twin mount Mk.V; 1 × quadruple tubes for 21 inch (533 mm) torpedoes Mk.IX; 4 throwers and 2 racks for 96 depth charges; 2 × Squid anti-submarine mortars after 1954

HMS Charity was a C-class destroyer of the Royal Navy laid down by John I. Thornycroft and Company of Woolston, Southampton on 9 July 1943. She was launched on 30 November 1944 and commissioned on 19 November 1945. She was sold to the US Navy in 1958, for transfer to the Pakistan Navy as a part of the Military Aid Program.

Renamed Shah Jahan, the ship was badly damaged in a strike by Indian Navy missile boats during the Indo-Pakistan War of 1971, and scrapped as a result.

== History in the Royal Navy ==
Commissioned too late for service in the Second World War, Charity's pennant number was soon changed to D29. She formed part of the 14th (later 1st) Destroyer Squadron for service in the Mediterranean. She saw service, along with other Royal Navy ships in preventing illegal immigration into Palestine in 1947.

Following the outbreak of hostilities Charity served during the Korean War, where she joined the 8th Destroyer Flotilla. She steamed 126,000 nautical miles (233,000 km; 145,000 mi) during the war, and her actions included destroying a train. The destroyer received a slight modernization, which involved the removal of one of her rear gun turrets ('X' mounting) which was replaced by mountings for two Squid anti-submarine launchers, which replaced her depth charges. She paid off into reserve in 1955.

== History in the Pakistan Navy ==
Charity was sold to the United States Navy on 16 June 1958, for further transfer to the Pakistan Navy. She was renamed Shah Jehan (DD-962). She was modernized by J. Samuel White in Cowes, England under a US contract and transferred to the Pakistan Navy as part of the Military Assistance Program on 16 December 1958 where she served as Shah Jahan (literally, "Emperor of the World", after Shah Jahan).

=== Indo-Pakistan War of 1971 ===
During the Indo-Pakistan War of 1971, Shah Jahan was escort to the cargo ship MV Venus Challenger carrying ammunition sent by the United States for the war effort from Saigon to Karachi.

On the night of 4 December 1971, the Indian Navy launched a fast naval strike called Operation Trident on the Pakistani Naval Headquarters of Karachi. The Operation Trident task force consisted of 3 Vidyut-class missile boats from the 25th "Killer" Missile Boat Squadron (Nipat, Nirghat, and Veer), escorted by two anti-submarine Arnala-class corvettes, Katchall and Kiltan, which approached Karachi.

The Indian missile boats evaded Pakistani reconnaissance aircraft and patrol vessels and converged at 2150 hours about 70 miles (110 km) south of Karachi, and detected the Pakistani naval vessels on patrol. At 2300 hours, Nipat fired 2 SS-N-2 Styx missiles at Shah Jahan and Venus Challenger. The ammunition aboard Venus Challenger exploded when the ship was hit by the missile, and the vessel quickly sunk. Shah Jahan was also struck by the missile and was irreparably damaged. She was towed back to Karachi and scrapped.

The Pakistani destroyer Khaibar and minesweeper Muhafiz were also sunk in the operation. The missile boats then hit the fuel storage tanks at Karachi harbour, setting them ablaze.

== Publications ==
- Colledge, J. J.; Warlow, Ben (2006) [1969]. Ships of the Royal Navy: The Complete Record of All Fighting Ships of the Royal Navy from the 15th Century to the Present (3rd Rev ed.). London: Chatham Publishing. ISBN 978-1-86176-281-8. OCLC 67375475.
- Marriott, Leo (1989). Royal Navy Destroyers Since 1945. Ian Allan Ltd. ISBN 0-7110-1817-0.
