= Vidyut =

Vidyut may refer to

- Vidyut (given name)
- Vidyut-class missile boat of Indian Navy
- INS Vidyut (disambiguation) – several ships
- Delhi Vidyut Board in India
- Uttar Pradesh Rajya Vidyut Utpadan Nigam, Indian electric-power company
