= INS Vidyut =

The following ships of the Indian Navy have been named INS Vidyut:

- INS Vidyut (K83) was the lead vessel of her class of fast attack craft of the Indian Navy which served in the Indo-Pakistani War of 1971
- INS Vidyut (K48) is a Veer-class corvette, currently in active service with the Indian Navy
