= K87 =

K87 or K-87 may refer to:

- K-87 (Kansas highway), a state highway in Kansas
- INS Nashak (K87), a former Indian Navy ship
- HMS Marigold (K87), a former UK Royal Navy ship
