= K86 =

K86 or K-86 may refer to:

- K-86 (Kansas highway), a state highway in Kansas
- INS Nipat (K86), a former Indian Navy ship
- HMS Arbutus (K86), a former UK Royal Navy ship
