= K88 =

K88 or K-88 may refer to:

- K-88 (Kansas highway), a state highway in Kansas
- INS Nirbhik (K88), a former Indian Navy ship
