= Babru Bhan Yadav =

Former Indian Navy Officer

Commodore Babru Bhan Yadav MVC
- Born: 14 September 1928; Bharawas, Rewari district, Haryana
- Died: 22 January 2010 (aged 81); Delhi, India
- Military career
- Allegiance: India
- Branch: Indian Navy
- Service years: 1951–1982
- Rank: Commodore
- Service number: 00101-B
- Unit: 25th Missile Boat Squadron
- Conflicts: Indo-Pakistani War of 1971; Operation Trident (1971)
- Awards: Maha Vir Chakra

Commodore Babru Bhan Yadav, MVC (14 September 1928 – 22 January 2010), also known as B.B. Yadav, was a former Indian Navy Officer. He led the 25th Missile Boat Squadron during Operation Trident in the Indo-Pakistani War of 1971.

== Early life and education ==
He was born in the village Bharawas in the Rewari district of Haryana to Major Bhagwan Singh Yadav. His father is known for taking part in both world wars. Yadav studied from Banares Hindu University and completed his graduation from St. Stephen's College in Delhi in 1947.

== Military career ==
Yadav joined Indian Navy on 1 January 1951 at the age of 23. He received his training from United Kingdom. He also went to Russia for training. He was the first Naval officer to be awarded the Maha Vir Chakra award for gallantry in the 1971 war.

He received the Maha Vir Chakra for his exceptional leadership and military skills which led to the destruction of Pakistan's most powerful naval regiment at the Karachi Naval base in the 1971 war. The Karachi Strike Group formed for Operation Trident and Operation Python was under his command. The strike group is also known as the Killer Squadron as India gained Naval supremacy over Pakistan in 1971 war. In memory of both the operations Indian Navy celebrates Navy Day on 4 December every year.

== Maha Vir Chakra Citation ==
The citation for the Maha Vir Chakra reads as follows:

Gazette Notification: 18 Pres/72,12-2-72

Operation: Operation Trident Date of Award: 05 Dec 1971

CITATION
COMMANDER BABRU BAHAN YADAV, (00101-B)

Commander Babru Bahan Yadav was the Squadron Commander of a division of ships which formed part of the Task Group of the Western Fleet ordered to carry out an offensive sweep on the enemy coast of Karachi on the night of 4th/5th December, 1971. Notwithstanding the threat of enemy air, surface and submarine attack, the officer led his division of ships deep into the enemy waters and encountered two groups of large enemy warships. Despite the heavy gun fire from the enemy destroyers and at great risk to his ships and personnel, Commander Yadav led his Squadron towards the enemy in a swift and determined attack. As a result, two enemy destroyers and one Mine sweeper were sunk.

In this operation, Commander Babru Bahan Yadav displayed conspicuous gallantry and leadership of a high order in the best traditions of the Indian Navy.

== Later life ==
Yadav served as the state Director of National Cadet Corps in Chandigarh for Punjab, Himachal Pradesh and Haryana. He retired from the navy in 1982. He later worked in the Merchant Navy. He died in Delhi, aged 81.
