= INS Nirghat (K89) =

History

Indian Navy
- Name: INS Nirghat
- Commissioned: 29 January 1971
- Decommissioned: 31 July 1989

General characteristics
- Class & type: Vidyut-class missile boat
- Displacement: 245 tons (full load)
- Length: 38.6 m (126 ft 8 in)
- Beam: 7.6 m (24 ft 11 in)
- Speed: 37+ knots
- Complement: 30
- Armament: 4 × SS-N-2A Styx anti-ship missiles; 2 × AK-230 30 mm (1.2 in) guns

INS Nirghat (K89) was a Vidyut-class missile boat of the Indian Navy.

INS Nirghat was a part of the 25th "Killer" Missile Squadron of the Indian Navy.

== Operation Trident ==
During the Indo-Pakistani War of 1971, INS Nirghat was part of the Operation Trident strike force, along with her sister vessels from the 25th Killer Squadron (INS Veer and INS Nipat). On the afternoon of 4 December 1971, the strike group made its way towards Karachi. Late that evening, around 70 mi (110 km) south of Karachi, Nirghat detected a large Pakistan Navy target, later identified as the destroyer PNS Khaibar, about 45 mi (72 km) to her northwest. Nirghat launched two SS-N-2 Styx missiles at Khaibar, sinking her.

Other vessels of the strike group sank the Pakistan Navy minesweeper PNS Muhafiz and the merchant ship MV Venus Challenger.

Lieutenant Commander Inderjit Sharma, the commanding officer, and Master Chief Petty Officer M. N. Sangal of Nirghat were awarded the Vir Chakra for their roles during the operation.
