= K89 =

K89 or K-89 may refer to:

- K-89 (Kansas highway), a state highway in Kansas
- INS Nirghat (K89), a former Indian Navy ship
