= INS Vijeta =

History

Indian Navy
- Name: INS Vijeta
- Commissioned: 27 March 1971
- Decommissioned: 30 June 1992

General characteristics
- Class & type: Vidyut-class missile boat
- Displacement: 245 tons (full load)
- Length: 38.6 meters
- Beam: 7.6 meters
- Speed: 37+ knots
- Complement: 30
- Armament: 4 × SS-N-2A Styx AShM; 2 × AK-230 30mm guns

INS Vijeta (K84) (Victor) was a Vidyut-class missile boat of the Indian Navy.
