= INS Nashak (K87) =

History

Indian Navy
- Name: INS Nashak
- Commissioned: 19 March 1971
- Decommissioned: 31 December 1990

General characteristics
- Class & type: Vidyut-class missile boat
- Displacement: 245 tons (full load)
- Length: 38.6 meters
- Beam: 7.6 meters
- Speed: 37+ knots
- Complement: 30
- Armament: 4 × SS-N-2A Styx AShM; 2 × AK-230 30mm guns

INS Nashak (K87) (Destroyer) was a Vidyut-class missile boat of the Indian Navy.
