= INS Vidyut (K83) =

History

Indian Navy
- Name: INS Vidyut
- Commissioned: 16 February 1971
- Decommissioned: 31 March 1991

General characteristics
- Class & type: Vidyut-class missile boat
- Displacement: 245 tons (full load)
- Length: 38.6 meters
- Beam: 7.6 meters
- Speed: 37+ knots
- Complement: 30
- Armament: 4 × SS-N-2A Styx AShM; 2 × AK-230 30mm guns

INS Vidyut (K83) (Lightning) was the lead vessel of her class of fast attack craft of the Indian Navy.
