= Vidyut (given name) =

Vidyut is an Indian masculine/feminine given name. The Sanskrit word vidyut has several meanings including "electric current" "shining, glittering", "lightning" and "the dawn". Notable people with this name are:

- Vidyut Jammwal (born 1980), Indian film actor/ Martial Artist
- Vidyut Sivaramakrishnan (born 1981), Indian cricketer
- Vidyut Gore (born 6 December 1976), Indian part-time blogger, new media journalist, campaigner and activist.
