= HMS Cadiz (D79) =

Battle-class destroyer of the United Kingdom and later Pakistan

- HMS Cadiz

History

United Kingdom
- Name: HMS Cadiz
- Namesake: Raid on Cadiz (1587)
- Builder: Fairfield Shipbuilding and Engineering Company
- Laid down: 10 May 1943
- Launched: 16 September 1944
- Commissioned: 12 April 1946
- Out of service: Placed in Reserve, 1953
- Identification: Pennant number D79
- Fate: Sold to Pakistan 1956

Pakistan
- Name: PNS Khaibar
- Namesake: Battle of Khaybar (628)
- Acquired: 1956
- Home port: Karachi
- Fate: Sunk during Indo-Pakistani War of 1971

General characteristics
- Class & type: Battle-class destroyer
- Displacement: 2,315 tons standard; 3,290 tons full load
- Length: 379 ft (116 m)
- Beam: 40 ft 3 in (12.27 m)
- Draught: 15.3 ft (4.7 m)
- Propulsion: 2 steam turbines, 2 shafts, 2 boilers, 50,000 shp (37 MW)
- Speed: 34 knots (63 km/h)
- Range: 4,400 nautical miles (8,100 km) at 12 knots (22 km/h)
- Complement: 268
- Armament: 2 × dual 4.5-inch (114 mm) gun; 14 × Bofors 40 mm gun; 10 × 21 inch (533 mm) torpedo tubes; 1 × Squid mortar

Service record
- Part of: 5th Destroyer Flotilla (UK)
- Operations: Indo-Pakistani War of 1971

HMS Cadiz was a Battle-class destroyer of the Royal Navy. She was named after the Battle of Cádiz, in which the French besieged the Spanish town in 1810, which was eventually lifted in 1812 after the French defeat at the Battle of Salamanca.

She was transferred to the Pakistan Navy in 1956, and commissioned as PNS Khaibar. She was sunk off her home port of Karachi by the Indian Navy missile boat, INS Nirghat during the Indo-Pakistan War of 1971.

== History in the Royal Navy ==
Cadiz was built by Fairfield Shipbuilding and Engineering Company. She was launched on 16 September 1944 and commissioned on 12 April 1946.

Upon her commissioning, Cadiz joined the 5th Destroyer Flotilla, part of the Home Fleet. In 1947, Cadiz, along with her sister ship Sluys, escorted the aircraft carrier Vengeance to Norway, where the small group visited a variety of ports in the Scandinavian country. In 1950, Cadiz along with many other vessels of the Home Fleet, including three aircraft carriers and the battleship Vanguard, undertook a Spring Cruise, visiting the Mediterranean where they performed a number of naval exercises as well as visiting a variety of ports in the region. In 1953, Cadiz took part in the Coronation Review to celebrate the Coronation of Elizabeth II. Cadiz was positioned in the middle of her sister-ships St. James and Solebay. In the same year, Cadiz was placed in Reserve, along with the rest of the ships in the 5th Destroyer Squadron.

== History in the Pakistan Navy ==
On 29 February 1956 the Admiralty announced that Cadiz was being sold to the Pakistan Navy. She was refitted and modernized with funds made available by the United States Mutual Defence Assistance Programme and commissioned as PNS Khaibar. The refit was undertaken by Alex Stephens and Sons Ltd, Govan, Glasgow. She was handed over to the Pakistan Navy on 1 February 1957.

=== The sinking of PNS Khaibar ===
During the Indo-Pakistan War of 1971, the Indian Navy launched a fast naval strike on the Pakistani Naval Headquarters of Karachi. On the night of 4 December 1971 as a part of Operation Trident, a task group consisting of 3 Vidyut-class missile boats from the 25th "Killer" Missile Boat Squadron, Nipat, Nirghat, and Veer, escorted by two anti-submarine Arnala-class corvettes, Katchall and Kiltan. approached Karachi.

At 2150 hrs, when the task group was 70 nautical miles (130 km) south of Karachi, they detected Pakistani naval vessels. Nirghat launched 2 SS-N-2 Styx missiles on the largest target, which was Khaibar, 45 miles to its northwest. Both missiles struck the destroyer, sinking it. Khaibar went down with most hands on board. A Pakistani minesweeper, Muhafiz, was also sunk and another destroyer, Shah Jahan was severely damaged, later scrapped as a result. The missile boats then hit the fuel storage tanks at Karachi Harbour, setting them ablaze.

== Publications ==
- Colledge, J. J.; Warlow, Ben (2006) [1969]. Ships of the Royal Navy: The Complete Record of All Fighting Ships of the Royal Navy from the 15th Century to the Present (3rd Rev ed.). London: Chatham Publishing. ISBN 978-1-86176-281-8. OCLC 67375475.
- Hodges, Peter (1971). Battle Class Destroyers. London: Almark Publishing. ISBN 0-85524-012-1.
