= Operation Trident (1971) =

Indian navy offensive against Pakistan

- Part of Indo-Pakistani War of 1971
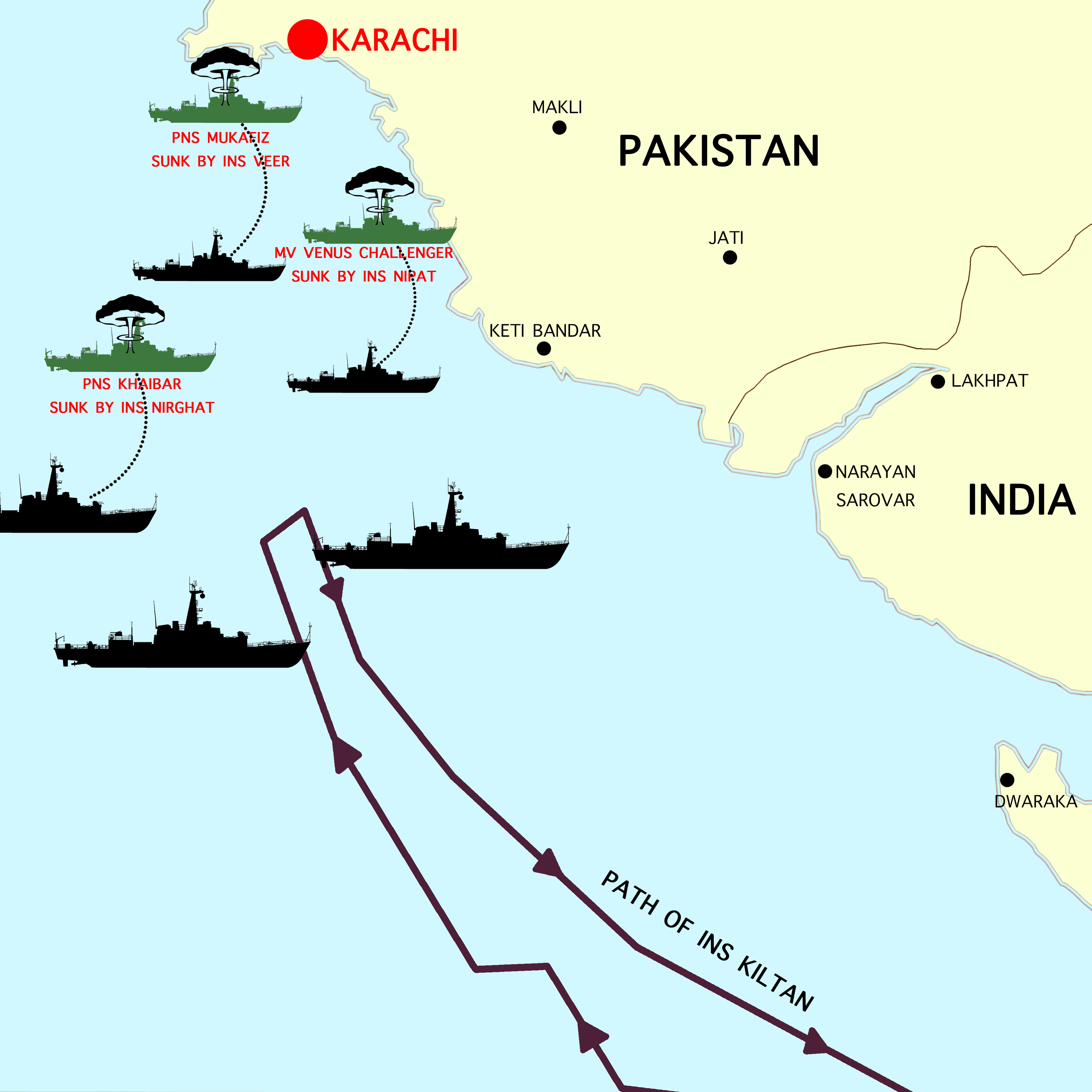
Date	4–5 December 1971
Location	Arabian Sea, 14–17 nautical miles (26–31 km; 16–20 mi) south of the Port of Karachi, Pakistan.
Result	Strategic Indian naval victory and partial naval blockade on Pakistan.

Belligerents
India	Pakistan

Commanders and leaders
K. P. Gopal Rao; Babru Bhan Yadav	M. A. K. Lodhi

Units involved
Indian Navy	Pakistan Navy

Strength
Three Vidyut-class missile boats; Two Arnala-class anti-submarine corvettes; One fleet tanker; One submarine (did not participate)	Ships deployed off the coast of Karachi

Casualties and losses
None	1 destroyer sunk; 1 minesweeper sunk; 1 cargo ship sunk; 1 destroyer badly damaged, scrapped as result; Karachi harbour fuel storage tanks destroyed; 255 naval personnel killed

Operation Trident was an offensive operation launched by the Indian Navy on Pakistan's port city of Karachi during the Indo-Pakistani War of 1971. Operation Trident saw the first use of anti-ship missiles in combat in the region. The operation was conducted on the night of 4–5 December and inflicted heavy damage on Pakistani vessels and facilities. While India suffered no losses, Pakistan lost a minesweeper, a destroyer, a cargo vessel carrying ammunition, and fuel storage tanks in Karachi. Another destroyer was also badly damaged and eventually scrapped. India celebrates its Navy Day annually on 4 December to mark this operation. Trident was followed up by Operation Python three days later

== Background ==
In 1971, the Port of Karachi housed the headquarters of the Pakistan Navy, and almost its entire fleet was based in Karachi Harbour. Since Karachi was also the hub of Pakistan's maritime trade, a blockade would be disastrous for Pakistan's economy. The security of Karachi Harbour was predominant to the Pakistani High Command, and it was heavily defended against any air or naval strikes. The strike aircraft based at airfields in the area secured the port's airspace.

Towards the end of 1971, there were rising tensions between India and Pakistan, and after Pakistan declared a national emergency on 23 November, the Indian Navy deployed three Vidyut-class missile boats in the vicinity of Okha, near Karachi, to carry out patrols. As the Pakistani fleet would also operate in the same waters, the Indian Navy set a demarcation line that ships in their fleet would not cross. Later, this deployment proved useful for gaining experience in the region's waters. On 3 December, after Pakistan attacked Indian airfields along the border, the Indo-Pakistani War of 1971 officially began.

While Operation Trident was primarily a naval strike, the Indian Air Force also conducted critical bombing raids on Karachi harbour facilities, oil tanks, and infrastructure. These joint efforts significantly impaired Pakistan’s maritime logistics. The humour-laced term "Karachi Halwa" was later coined informally to describe the destructive sweet mix they delivered over Karachi.

== Operation ==
=== Prelude ===
The Indian Naval Headquarters (NHQ) in Delhi, along with the Western Naval Command, planned to attack the Port of Karachi. A strike group under Western Naval Command was formed for this mission. This strike group was to be based around the three Vidyut-class missile boats already deployed off the coast of Okha. However, these boats had limited operational and radar range, and to overcome this difficulty, it was decided to assign support vessels to the group.

On 4 December, what was now designated as the Karachi Strike Group was formed and consisted of the three Vidyut-class missile boats: INS Nipat, INS Nirghat and INS Veer, each armed with four Soviet-made SS-N-2B Styx surface-to-surface missiles with a range of 40 nautical miles (74 km; 46 mi), two Arnala-class anti-submarine corvettes: INS Kiltan and INS Katchall, and a fleet tanker, INS Poshak. The group was under the command of Commander Babru Bhan Yadav, the commanding officer of the 25th Missile Boat Squadron. The submarine INS Karanj monitored the entire attack from a distance.

=== Attack ===
As planned, on 4 December, the strike group reached 250 nautical miles (460 km; 290 mi) (nmi) south off the coast of Karachi and maintained its position during the day, outside the surveillance range of the Pakistan Air Force. As Pakistani aircraft did not possess night-bombing capabilities, it was planned that the attack would take place between dusk and dawn. At 10.30 pm Pakistan Standard Time (PKT), the Indian task group moved 180 nmi (330 km; 210 mi) from its position towards the south of Karachi. Soon, Pakistani targets, identified as warships, were detected 70 nmi (130 km; 81 mi) to the northwest and northeast of the Indian warships. A Pakistani navy midget submarine attempted to attack the corvette escorts but did not obtain a firing solution.

INS Nirghat sailed forward in a northwesterly direction and fired its first Styx missile at PNS Khaibar, a Pakistani Battle-class destroyer. Khaibar, assuming it was a missile from Indian aircraft, engaged its anti-aircraft systems. The missile hit the right side of the ship, exploding below the galley in the electrician's mess deck at 10.45 pm (PKT). This led to an explosion in the first boiler room. Subsequently, the ship lost propulsion and was flooded with smoke. An emergency signal that read: "Enemy aircraft attacked in position 020 FF 20. No. 1 boiler hit. Ship stopped", was sent to Pakistan Naval Headquarters (PNHQ). Due to the chaos created by the explosion, the signal contained the wrong coordinates of the ship's position. This delayed rescue teams from reaching its location. Observing that the ship was still afloat, Nirghat fired its second missile, hitting Khaibar in the second boiler room on the ship's starboard side, eventually sinking the ship and killing 222 sailors.

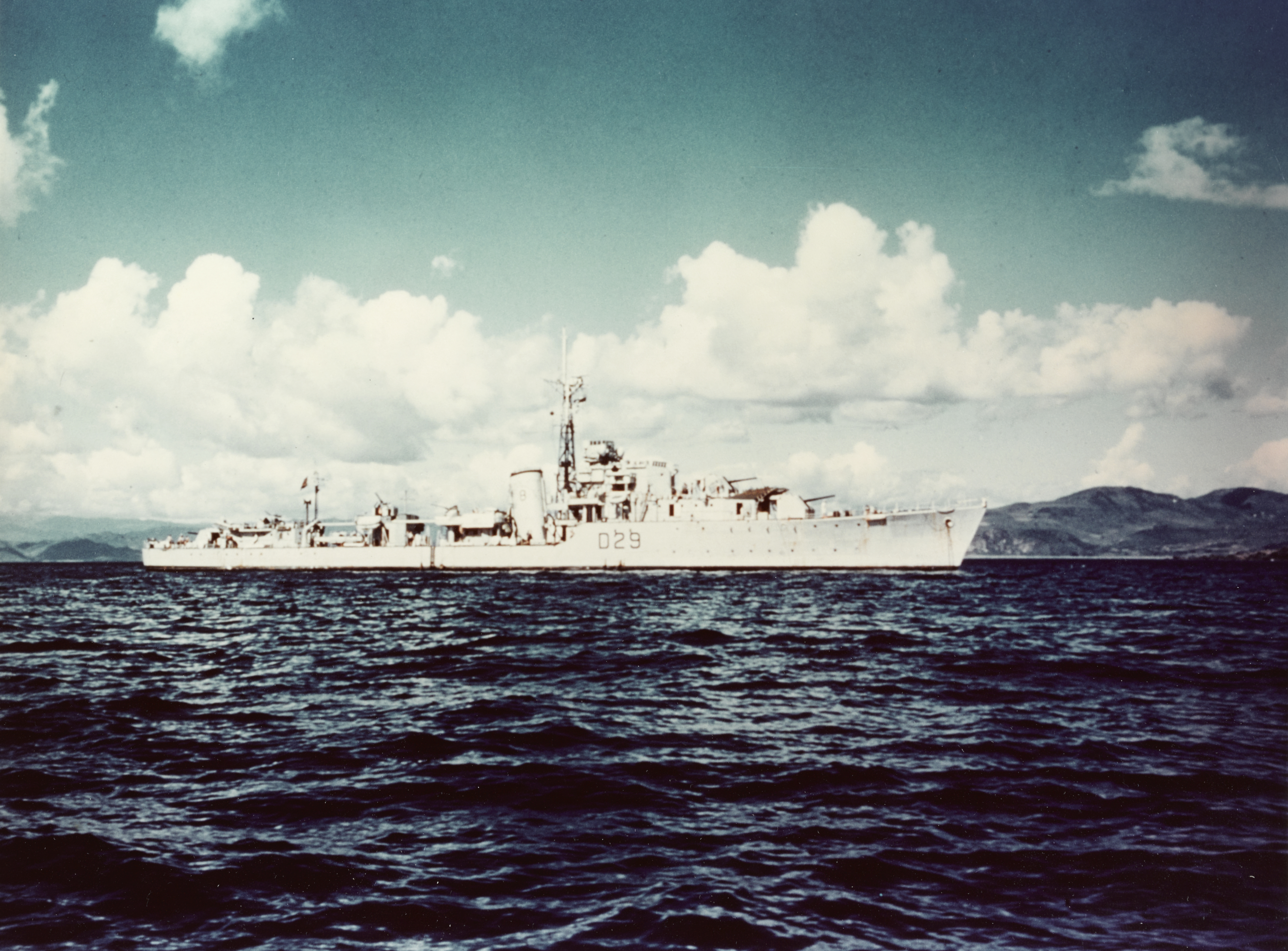
A PNS destroyer, Shah Jahan, shown here in the service of the British Royal Navy when it was known as HMS Charity, was badly damaged by Styx missiles fired by INS Nipat on 4 December 1971

After verifying two targets in the area northwest of Karachi, at 11.00 pm (PKT), INS Nipat fired two Styx missiles – one each at cargo vessel MV Venus Challenger and its escort PNS Shah Jahan, a C-class destroyer. Venus Challenger, carrying ammunition for the Pakistani forces, exploded immediately after the missile hit and eventually sank 23 nmi (43 km; 26 mi) south of Karachi. The other missile targeted Shah Jahan and damaged the ship very badly. At 11.20 pm (PKT), PNS Muhafiz, an Adjutant-class minesweeper, was targeted by INS Veer. A missile was fired, and Muhafiz was struck on the left side, behind the bridge. It sank immediately before it could send a signal to the PNHQ, killing 33 sailors.

Meanwhile, INS Nipat continued towards Karachi and targeted the Kemari oil storage tanks, placing itself 14 nmi (26 km; 16 mi) south of the Karachi Harbour. Two missiles were launched; one misfired, but the other hit the oil tanks, which burned and were destroyed completely, causing a Pakistani fuel shortage. The task force returned to the nearest Indian ports.

Soon, the PNHQ deployed rescue teams on patrol vessels to recover the survivors of Khaibar. As Muhafiz sank before it could transmit a distress call, the Pakistanis only learned of its fate from its few survivors who were recovered when a patrol vessel steered towards the ship's burning flotsam.

== Aftermath ==
The Pakistan Air Force retaliated for these attacks by bombing Okha Port, scoring direct hits on fuelling facilities for missile boats, an ammunition dump, and the missile boats' jetty. The Indian Navy anticipated this attack and had already moved the missile boats to other locations to prevent any losses. However, the destruction of a special fuel tank prevented further incursions until Operation Python, executed three days later.

As a result of the operation, the Pakistan Armed Forces were put on high alert. The deployments raised several false alarms in the ensuing days about the presence of Indian Navy vessels off Karachi. One such false alarm was raised by a Pakistan Navy Fokker Friendship reconnaissance aircraft on 6 December 1971, which incorrectly reported a frigate of the Pakistan Navy as an Indian Navy missile boat. The PNHQ requested a Pakistan Air Force air strike on the supposed Indian ship. At 06.45 am (PKT), fighter jets were scrambled and strafed the vessel before it was identified as the frigate PNS Zulfiqar. This friendly fire incident resulted in casualties and damage to the vessel.

With no casualties on the Indian side, this operation was a great success. To mark its victory, the Indian Navy annually celebrates Navy Day on 4 December.

=== Awards ===
Several Indian Navy personnel were honoured with gallantry awards for the operation. Then Fleet Operations Officer, Captain (later Vice Admiral) Gulab Mohanlal Hiranandani, was awarded the Nau Sena Medal for the detailed operational planning; the Maha Vir Chakra was awarded to the strike group commander, Cdr Babru Bhan Yadav, for planning and leading the task force; and Vir Chakras were awarded to Lieutenant Commanders Bahadur Nariman Kavina, Inderjit Sharma, M O Thomachan and Om Prakash Mehta, the commanding officers of INS Nipat, INS Nirghat, and INS Veer respectively. Master Chief M. N. Sangal of INS Nirghat was also awarded the Vir Chakra. Lieutenant Phool Kumar Puri, Engineering Officer INS Veer, was awarded the Nau Sena Medal for his efforts in the 1971 war.

== See also ==
- INS Khukri
- Indo-Pakistani War of 1971
- Operation Searchlight
- Operation Triumph/Falcon
- Indo-Pakistani wars and conflicts
- Indo-Pakistani Naval War of 1971
- List of ships sunk by missiles
