= INS Nirbhik (K88) =

History

Indian Navy
- Name: INS Nirbhik
- Commissioned: 20 February 1971
- Decommissioned: 31 December 1986

General characteristics
- Class & type: Vidyut-class missile boat
- Displacement: 245 tons (full load)
- Length: 38.6 meters
- Beam: 7.6 meters
- Speed: 37+ knots
- Complement: 30
- Armament: 4 × SS-N-2A Styx AShM; 2 × AK-230 30mm guns

INS Nirbhik (K88) (Fearless) was a Vidyut-class missile boat of the Indian Navy. It was this ship that the first missile launch was done to demonstrate to the then Prime Minister, Defence Minister and other dignitaries. The missile was launched by Lt. G. Sri Rama Rao.
