= INS Nipat (K86) =

History

Indian Navy
- Name: INS Nipat
- Commissioned: 26 April 1971
- Decommissioned: 29 February 1988

General characteristics
- Class & type: Vidyut-class missile boat
- Displacement: 245 tons (full load)
- Length: 38.6 meters
- Beam: 7.6 meters
- Speed: 37+ knots
- Complement: 30
- Armament: 4 × SS-N-2A Styx AShM; 2 × AK-230 30mm guns

INS Nipat (K86) was a Vidyut-class missile boat of the Indian Navy. It was part of the 25th "Killer" Missile squadron.

== Operation Trident ==
During the Indo-Pakistani War of 1971, INS Nipat was part of the Operation Trident strike force. On the afternoon of 4 December, the strike group made its way towards Karachi. Late that evening, around 70 miles south of Karachi, the Nipat detected two targets about 42 miles to the northeast, later identified as the merchant vessel, MV Venus Challenger, chartered by the Pakistan Navy to carry US ammunition to East Pakistan and its escort PNS Shah Jahan, a C-class destroyer. Venus Challenger, carrying ammunition for the Pakistani forces, exploded immediately after the missile hit and eventually sank 23 nmi (43 km; 26 mi) south of Karachi. The other missile targeted Shah Jahan and heavily damaged the ship.

The INS Nipat continued towards Karachi and targeted the Kemari oil storage tanks, placing itself 14 nmi (26 km; 16 mi) south of the Karachi Harbour. Two missiles were launched; one misfired, but the other hit the oil tanks, which burned and were destroyed completely.

Other vessels of the strike group sank a Pakistan Navy destroyer PNS Khaibar and a minesweeper PNS Muhafiz.

Lieutenant Commander Bahadur Nariman Kavina, the commanding officer of the Nipat was awarded the Vir Chakra for his role during the operation.
