= INS Veer (K82) =

Vidyut-class missile boat of the Indian Navy

History

Indian Navy
- Name: INS Veer
- Commissioned: 2 April 1971
- Decommissioned: 31 December 1982

General characteristics
- Class & type: Vidyut-class missile boat
- Displacement: 245 tons (full load)
- Length: 38.6 m (126 ft 8 in)
- Beam: 7.6 m (24 ft 11 in)
- Speed: 37+ knots
- Complement: 30
- Armament: 4 × SS-N-2A Styx anti-ship missiles; 2 × AK-230 30 mm (1.2 in) guns

INS Veer (K82) (Brave) was a Vidyut-class missile boat of the Indian Navy.

INS Veer was a part of the 25th "Killer" Missile Squadron of the Indian Navy.

== Operation Trident ==
During the Indo-Pakistani War of 1971, INS Veer was one of the three missile boats in the Operation Trident task force. On the afternoon of 4 December, the strike group made its way towards Karachi.

Late that evening, around 70 mi (110 km) south of Karachi, the Veer detected a large Pakistan Navy target, later identified as the minesweeper PNS Muhafiz on patrol to its north. Veer launched 1 SS-N-2 'Styx' missile on the target, sinking PNS Muhafiz.

Other vessels of the strike group sank a Pakistan Navy destroyer, PNS Khaibar and the merchant ship MV Venus Challenger, and caused irreparable damage to the destroyer PNS Shah Jahan.

Lieutenant Commander Om Prakash Mehta, the commanding officer of the Veer, was awarded the Vir Chakra for his role during the operation. Lieutenant Phool Kumar Puri, Engineering Officer, INS Veer was awarded the Nau Sena Medal for his efforts in the Indo-Pakistani War of 1971.
