= PNS Muhafiz =

Adjutant-class minesweeper of the Pakistan Navy

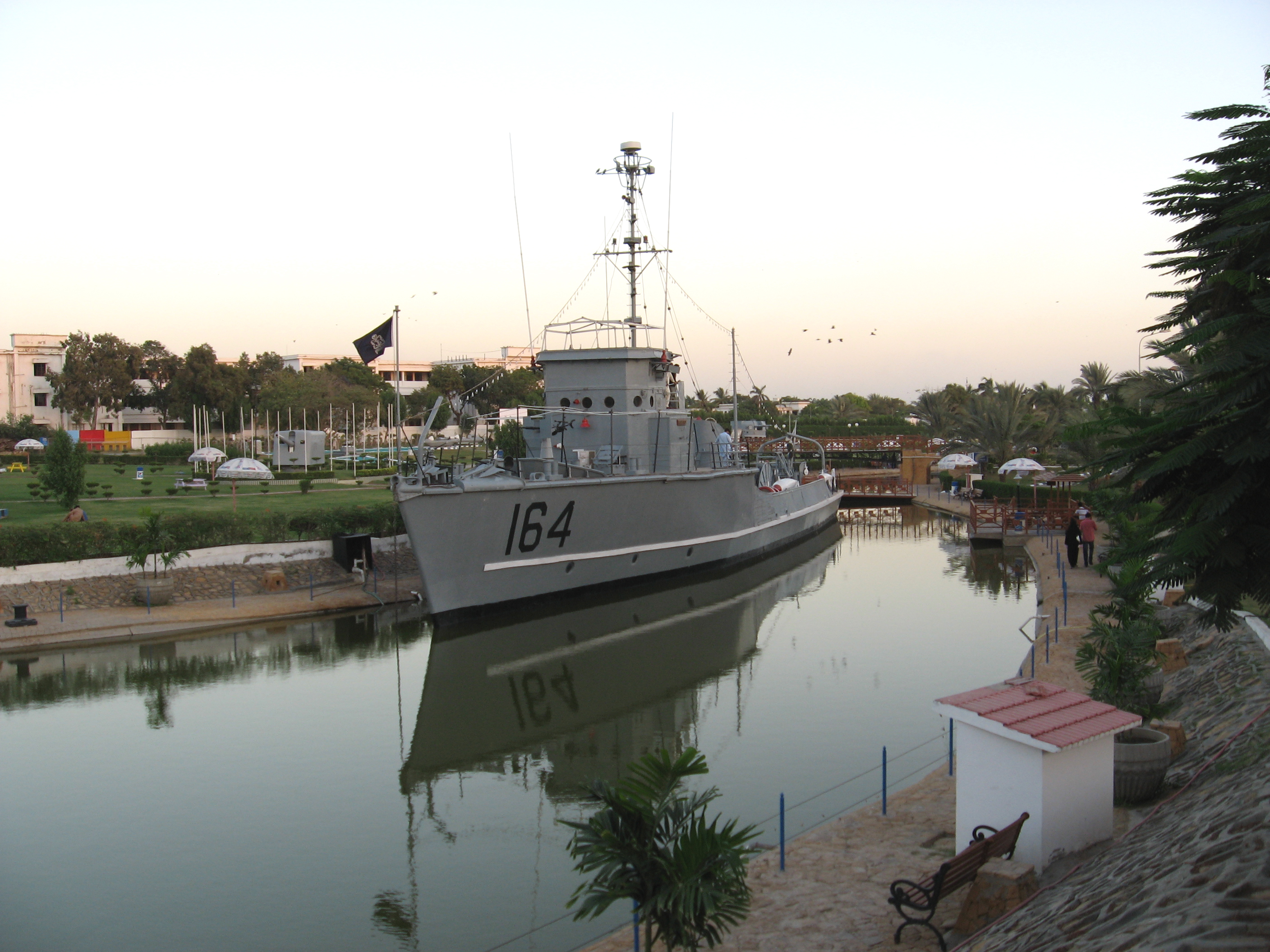
- PNS Mujahid, sister ship of PNS Muhafiz

History
- Name: PNS Muhafiz (M 163)
- Builder: Bellingham Shipyards Co., Bellingham, Washington, USA
- Laid down: as AMS-138
- Commissioned: 6 February 1955
- Fate: Sunk by INS Veer on 4 December 1971

General characteristics
- Class & type: Adjutant-class minesweeper
- Displacement: 362 tons
- Length: 144 ft 3 in (43.97 m)
- Beam: 27 ft 2 in (8.28 m)
- Draught: 12 ft (3.7 m)
- Propulsion: 2 × 880 bhp (656 kW) General Motors 8-268A diesel engines
- Speed: 13 knots (24 km/h; 15 mph)
- Complement: 40
- Armament: 1 × twin 20-mm

PNS Muhafiz was an Adjutant-class minesweeper of the Pakistan Navy. It was built by the United States for transfer to Pakistan. PNS Muhafiz was sunk by a missile from INS Veer of the Indian Navy during the Indo-Pakistani War of 1971.

PNS Zulfiqar (K265) of Pakistan was also damaged beyond repair by friendly fire from aircraft of the Pakistan Air Force (PAF) which mistook her for a missile boat of the Indian Navy during the same war. India also lost INS Khukri in this war.

== Operation Trident ==
During the Indo-Pakistani War of 1971, The minesweeper PNS Muhafiz was tasked to patrol the approaches to port of Karachi. To do so it was deployed on the inner cordon.

Late that evening on 4 December 1971, around 70 miles south of Karachi, the INS Veer detected a large Pakistan Navy target, later identified as the Muhafiz on patrol to its north. Veer launched a single SS-N-2 Styx missile on the target, sinking Muhafiz. It was later learned that at 23:30 the Muhafiz was hit by Styx missiles, and sank in the Indian Ocean at about 23:35.

Other vessels of the Indian Navy strike group sank the Pakistan Navy destroyer, PNS Khaibar and the merchant ship Venus Challenger (carrying navy personnel and ammunition for Pakistan), and caused irreparable damage to the destroyer PNS Shah Jahan.

== See also ==
- Indo-Pakistani War of 1971
- Timeline of the Bangladesh Liberation War
- Military plans of the Bangladesh Liberation War
- Mitro Bahini order of battle
- Pakistan Army order of battle, December 1971
- Evolution of Pakistan Eastern Command plan
- 1971 Bangladesh genocide
- Operation Searchlight
- Indo-Pakistani wars and conflicts
- Military history of India
- List of military disasters
- List of ships sunk by missiles
- List of wars involving India
