= Vidyut-class missile boat =

Indian variant of the Soviet Osa-class missile boat

Class overview
- Name: Vidyut class
- Operators: Indian Navy
- Succeeded by: Chamak class
- Planned: 8
- Completed: 8
- Retired: 8

General characteristics
- Type: Fast attack craft
- Displacement: 245 tons (full load)
- Length: 38.6 m (127 ft)
- Beam: 7.6 m (25 ft)
- Speed: 37 knots (69 km/h)+
- Complement: 30
- Armament: 4 × SS-N-2A Styx anti-ship missile; 2 × AK-230 30mm guns

The Vidyut-class missile boats (Sanskrit; Devanagari: विद्युत्, lightning) of the Indian Navy were an Indian variant of the Soviet Osa I class.

These vessels formed the 25th "Killer" Missile Boat Squadron, which sunk 2 destroyers, a minesweeper and various other vessels of the Pakistan Navy during the Indo-Pakistani War of 1971.

== Acquisition ==
In 1964, the Soviet Union offered the Osa-class missile boats to a visiting Indian delegation. However, the Indian Navy showed no interest in the smaller boats at the time.

Until 1965, the primary acquisitions of the Indian Navy had been from Britain. After the Indo-Pakistani War of 1965, the British declined to transfer modern equipment to India. So, India turned to the Soviet Union for its military acquisitions.

In 1967, during the Six-Day War, an Egyptian missile boat attacked and sank the Israeli frigate, Eilat, from a range well beyond the frigate's guns.

In 1968, a Pakistani delegation to the Soviet Union was also offered the missile boats and transfer of associated infrastructure. However, the Pakistan Navy wanted larger vessels and turned down the offer.

In 1969, after examining the performance of the Egyptian boats during the Six Day War, India finalized agreements for the acquisition of the Osa-I-class missile boats from the Soviet Union. The vessels were commissioned into the Indian Navy starting in 1971, a few months before the start of the war with Pakistan.

== Operations ==
During the Indo-Pakistani War of 1971, the 25th Missile Boat Squadron, consisting of vessels from the Vidyut class, played a crucial role in the Indian attacks on Karachi in December 1971. The two key operations in which these vessels played an active role, were Operation Trident and Operation Python. Indian attacks destroyed half of the Pakistani Navy and most of Pakistan's naval fuel reserves in the port's fuel storage tanks, which cleared the way for the decisive victory of the Indian Armed Forces.

Commander B.B. Yadav, who commanded Operation Trident was awarded the Maha Vir Chakra. Lieutenant Commander B.N. Kavina, Petty Officer M.O. Thomachan, Petty Officer R.N. Sharma and L.K. Chakravarty and Lieutenant Commander Inderjit Sharma received the Vir Chakra for their roles in Operation Trident. Lieutenant Commander Vijai Jerath, was awarded the Vir Chakra for Operation Python.

== Ships of the class ==
Name	Pennant	Commissioned	Decommissioned	Notes
Veer	K82	2 April 1971	31 December 1982	
Vidyut	K83	16 February 1971	31 March 1991	
Vijeta	K84	27 March 1971	30 June 1992	
Vinash	K85	20 January 1971	15 January 1990	
Nipat	K86	26 April 1971	29 February 1988	
Nashak	K87	19 March 1971	31 December 1990	
Nirbhik	K88	20 February 1971	31 December 1986	
Nirghat	K89	29 January 1971	31 July 1989	
