= India–Pakistan war of 1971 =

Military confrontation between India and Pakistan alongside the Bangladesh Liberation War

Indo-Pakistani war of 1971
- Part of the Indo-Pakistani wars and conflicts, Cold War, and Bangladesh Liberation War
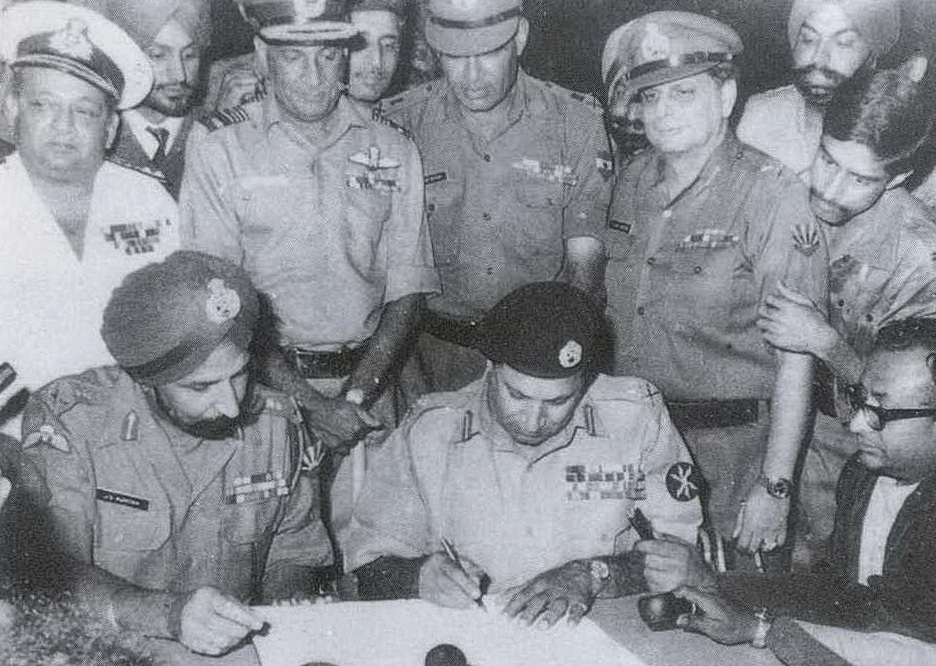
- First row: Lt-Gen. A.A.K. Niazi, the Cdr. of Pakistani Eastern Comnd., signing the documented Instrument of Surrender in Dacca in the presence of Lt. Gen. Jagjit Singh Aurora (GOC-in-C of Indian Eastern Comnd.). Surojit Sen of All India Radio is seen holding a microphone on the right. Second row (left to right): Vice Adm. N. Krishnan (FOC-in-C Eastern Naval Comnd.), Air Mshl. H.C. Dewan, (AOC-in-C Eastern Air Comnd.), Lt Gen. Sagat Singh (Cdr. IV Corps), Maj Gen. JFR Jacob (COS Eastern Comnd.) and Flt Lt Krishnamurthy (peering over Jacob's shoulder).
Date	3–16 December 1971 (1 week and 6 days)
Location	India–East Pakistan border; India–West Pakistan border; Line of Control; Indian Ocean; Arabian Sea; Bay of Bengal
Result	Indian victory Eastern front: Surrender of East Pakistan military command Western front: Unilateral ceasefire
Territorial changes	Eastern Front: East Pakistan secedes from Pakistan as Bangladesh; Western Front: Indian forces captured around 15,010 km^{2} (5,795 sq mi) of land in the West but returned it in the 1972 Simla Agreement as a gesture of goodwill.; India retained 883 km^{2} (341.1 sq mi) of the gained territory in Jammu and Kashmir while Pakistan retained 150 km^{2} (59 sq mi) territory

Belligerents
India; Provisional Government of Bangladesh	Pakistan

Commanders and leaders
(India) Indira Gandhi (India) Swaran Singh; Sam Manekshaw; J.S. Arora; G.G. Bewoor; Sagat Singh; J. F. R. Jacob; S. M. Nanda; S. N. Kohli; Nilakanta Krishnan; Pratap C. Lal; H. C. Dewan (Bangladesh) Sheikh Mujibur Rahman (Provisional Government of Bangladesh) M. A. G. Osmani	(Pakistan) Yahya Khan; Abdul Hamid Khan; A.A.K. Niazi (surrendered); Tikka Khan; Rao Farman; Iftikhar Janjua †; Muzaffar Hassan; Rashid Ahmed; Md Shariff (surrendered); M.A.K. Lodhi; Leslie Norman; Abdul Rahim Khan; Inamul Haq (surrendered); Z.A. Khan (surrendered) (Pakistan) Abdul Motaleb Malik (surrendered)

Strength
Indian Armed Forces: 825,000 – 860,000; Mukti Bahini: 180,000	Pakistan Armed Forces: 350,000 – 365,000; Razakars: 35,000

Casualties and losses
India; 2,500–3,843 killed 9,851–12,000 injured: 1 naval aircraft; 2 frigate; 1 sunk; 1 damaged; Okha harbour damaged/fuel tanks destroyed; Neutral claims: 45 IAF aircraft; 80 tanks; Indian claims: 45 IAF aircraft; Pakistani claims: 130 IAF aircraft	Pakistan; 9,000 killed 25,000 wounded 93,000 captured 2 destroyers (Note: A Pakistani destroyer, Shah Jahan, was severely damaged and later scrapped as a result.); 1 Minesweeper; 1 Submarine; 3 Patrol vessels 7 gunboats: Pakistani main port Karachi facilities damaged/fuel tanks destroyed; Pakistani airfields damaged and cratered; Neutral claims: 75 PAF aircraft; 200 tanks; Indian claims: 94 PAF aircraft; Pakistani claims: 42 PAF aircraft

The India–Pakistan war of 1971, also known as the third Indo-Pakistani war, was a military confrontation between India and Pakistan that occurred during the Bangladesh Liberation War in East Pakistan from 3 December 1971 until the Pakistani capitulation in Dhaka on 16 December 1971. The war began with Pakistan's Operation Chengiz Khan, consisting of preemptive aerial strikes on eight Indian air stations. The strikes led to India declaring war on Pakistan, marking their entry into the war for East Pakistan's independence, on the side of Bengali nationalist forces. India's entry expanded the existing conflict with Indian and Pakistani forces engaging on both the eastern and western fronts.

Thirteen days after the war started, India achieved a clear advantage, and the Eastern Command of the Pakistan military signed the instrument of surrender on 16 December 1971 in Dhaka, marking the formation of East Pakistan as the new nation of Bangladesh. Approximately 93,000 Pakistani servicemen were taken prisoner by the Indian Army, which included 79,676 to 81,000 uniformed personnel of the Pakistan Armed Forces, including some Bengali soldiers who had remained loyal to Pakistan. The remaining 10,324 to 12,500 prisoners were civilians, either family members of the military personnel or collaborators (Razakars).

It is estimated that members of the Pakistani military, supporting pro-Pakistani Islamist militias and the Razakars killed between 300,000 and 3,000,000 civilians in Bangladesh. As a result of the conflict, a further eight to ten million people fled the country to seek refuge in India.

During the war, members of the Pakistani military and the Razakars raped between 200,000 and 400,000 Bangladeshi women and girls in a systematic campaign of genocidal rape.

== Background ==
The Indo-Pakistani conflict was sparked by the Bangladesh Liberation War, which was a result of the violation of the rights of East Pakistan by the Pakistan Army. The political tensions in East Pakistan had its origin in the creation of Pakistan as a result of the partition of India by the United Kingdom in 1947; the popular language movement in 1950; mass riots in East Bengal in 1964; and the mass protests in 1969. These led to the resignation of President Ayub Khan, who invited army chief General Yahya Khan to take over the central government. The geographical distance between the eastern and western wings of Pakistan was vast; East Pakistan lay over 1,600 kilometres (1,000 mi) away, which greatly hampered any attempt to integrate the Bengali and the Pakistani cultures.

To overcome the Bengali domination and prevent formation of the central government in Islamabad, the controversial One Unit programme established the two wings of East and West Pakistan. West Pakistanis' opposition to these efforts made it difficult to effectively govern both wings. In 1969, President Yahya Khan announced the first general elections and disestablished the status of West Pakistan as a single province in 1970, in order to restore it to its original heterogeneous status comprising four provinces, as defined at the time of establishment of Pakistan in 1947. In addition, there were religious and racial tensions between Bengalis and the multi-ethnic West Pakistanis, as Bengalis looked different from the dominant West Pakistanis.

The East Pakistan's Awami League leader Sheikh Mujibur Rahman stressed his political position by presenting his Six Points and endorsing the Bengalis' right to govern themselves. The 1970 Pakistani general election, resulted in Awami League gaining 167 out of 169 seats for the East Pakistan Legislative Assembly, and a near-absolute majority in the 313-seat National Assembly, while the vote in West Pakistan was mostly won by the socialist Pakistan Peoples Party. The League's election success caused many West Pakistanis to fear that it would allow the Bengalis to draft the constitution based on the Six Points and liberalism.

To resolve the crisis, the Admiral Ahsan Mission was formed to provide recommendations. Its findings were met with favourable reviews from the political leaders of West Pakistan, with the exception of Zulfikar Ali Bhutto, the chairman of the Pakistan Peoples Party.

However, the military leadership vetoed the mission's proposal. Zulfikar Ali Bhutto endorsed the veto, and subsequently refused to yield the premiership of Pakistan to Sheikh Mujibur Rahman. The Awami League called for general strikes throughout the country. President Yahya Khan postponed the inauguration of the National Assembly, causing disillusionment among the Awami League and their supporters throughout East Pakistan. In reaction, Sheikh Mujibur Rahman called for general strikes that eventually shut down the government, and dissidents in the east began targeting the ethnic Bihari community, which largely supported West Pakistan.

In early March 1971, approximately 300 Biharis were slaughtered in riots by Bengali mobs in Chittagong alone. The government of Pakistan used the "Bihari massacre" to justify its deployment of the military in East Pakistan on 25 March, when it initiated its military crackdown. President Yahya Khan called on the military—which was overwhelmingly led by West Pakistanis—to suppress dissent in the east, after accepting the resignation of Lieutenant-General Yaqub Ali Khan, the chief of staff of the East Pakistani military.

Mass arrests of dissidents began and, after several days of strikes and non-cooperation, the Pakistani military, led by Lieutenant-General Tikka Khan, cracked down on Dhaka on the night of 25 March 1971. The government outlawed the Awami League, which forced many of its members and sympathisers to seek refuge in Eastern India. Mujib was arrested that night at about 1:30 am (as per Radio Pakistan's news on 29 March) and taken to West Pakistan. Operation Searchlight, followed by Operation Barisal, which attempted to kill the intellectual elite of the east.

On 26 March 1971, Major Ziaur Rahman of the Pakistan Army declared the independence of Bangladesh on behalf of Sheikh Mujibur Rahman.

In April, the exiled Awami League leaders formed a government-in-exile in Baidyanathtala of Meherpur. The East Pakistan Rifles and Bengali officers in Pakistan's army, navy, and marines defected to the rebellion after taking refuge in different parts of India. The Bangladesh Force, namely the Mukti Bahini, consisting of a conventional force and a guerilla force, was formed under the retired colonel Mohammad Ataul Gani Osmani. There was also a meeting between Prime Minister Indira Gandhi and President Richard Nixon in November 1971, in which the former rejected American advice against intervening in the conflict.

=== India's involvement in the Bangladesh Liberation War ===
After the resignations of Admiral S.M. Ahsan and Lieutenant-General Yaqub Ali Khan, the press began airing reports of the Pakistani military's widespread genocide against their Bengali citizens, particularly targeting the minority Bengali Hindus, which led to approximately 10 million people seeking refuge in the neighbouring states of Eastern India. The Government of India opened the East Pakistan–India border to allow Bengali refugees to find shelter; the governments of West Bengal, Bihar, Assam, Meghalaya and Tripura established refugee camps along the border. The resulting flood of impoverished East Pakistani refugees strained India's already overburdened economy.

The Indian Government repeatedly appealed to the international community for assistance, but failed to elicit any response, despite External Affairs Minister Swaran Singh meeting foreign ministers of other countries. Prime Minister Indira Gandhi on 27 March 1971 concluded that, instead of taking in millions of refugees, it was better to go to war with Pakistan, and expressed the full support of her government for the independence struggle of the people of East Pakistan. On 28 April 1971, the Union cabinet ordered the Chief of the Army Staff General Sam Manekshaw to "Go into East Pakistan". East Pakistan military officer defectors and elements of the Indian Research and Analysis Wing (RAW) immediately started using the Indian refugee camps for the recruitment and training of Mukti Bahini guerrillas.

By November 1971, the Indian military fired artillery at Pakistani troops and even made several incursions into Pakistani territory.

The Indian authorities also attempted to carry on psychological warfare and keep up the morale of comrades in East Pakistan. The Swadhin Bangla Betar Kendra (Free Bangladesh Radio Centre), which had broadcast Major Rahman's independence declaration, was relocated from Kalurghat in East Pakistan to India after the transmission building was attacked by Pakistani Sabre jets on 30 March 1971. It resumed broadcasting on 3 April from Tripura, aided by the Indian Border Security Force. The clandestine station was finally shifted to Kolkata, where it was joined by a large number of Bangladeshi radio programmers, newscasters, poets, singers and journalists. Its jurisdiction was transferred to the provisional Bangladesh government-in-exile, and made its first broadcast on 25 May, the anniversary of the birth of poet Kazi Nazrul Islam (who would later be named Bangladesh's national poet). Among the Indian contributors to the radio station's nationalistic programmes was Salil Chowdhury. Akashvani Kolkata also actively took part in this effort.

== Objective ==
By the end of April 1971, Prime Minister Indira Gandhi had asked the Indian Chief of Army Staff Gen Sam Manekshaw if he was ready to go to war with Pakistan. According to Manekshaw's own personal account, he refused, citing the onset of monsoon season in East Pakistan and also the fact that the army tanks were being refitted. He offered his resignation, which Gandhi declined. He then said he could guarantee victory if she would allow him to prepare for the conflict on his terms, and set a date for it; Gandhi accepted his conditions. In reality, Gandhi was well aware of the difficulties of a hasty military action, but she needed to get the military's views to satisfy her hawkish colleagues and the public opinion, which were critical of India's restraint.

By mid July, India had settled on a plan of attack. The ground in the East would be drier by mid November, which would make a rapid offensive easier. By early to mid December, the Himalayan passes would be closed by snow, limiting China's ability to intervene.

The news media's mood in Pakistan had turned increasingly jingoistic and militaristic against East Pakistan and India when the Pakistani news media reported the complexity of the situation in the East, though the reactions from Pakistan's news media pundits were mixed. By the end of September 1971, a propaganda campaign, possibly orchestrated by elements within the government of Pakistan, resulted in stickers endorsing "Crush India" becoming a standard feature on the rear windows of vehicles in Rawalpindi, Islamabad and Lahore; this soon spread to the rest of West Pakistan. By October, other stickers proclaimed Hang the Traitor in an apparent reference to Sheikh Mujibur Rahman.

From mid October to 20 November, the Indian army conducted multiple incursions into East Pakistani territory, generally withdrawing to India after completing their mission. From 21 November, however, Indian forces with Mukti Bahini support entered East Pakistan and remained there in preparation for a formal war that India expected to launch on 6 December.

An Indian-Pakistani war seemed inevitable. The Soviet Union reportedly warned Pakistan against the war, which they termed as "suicidal course for Pakistan's unity." Despite this warning, in November 1971, thousands of people led by conservative Pakistani politicians marched in Lahore and across Pakistan, calling for Pakistan to "crush India". On 23 November, President Yahya Khan declared a national state of emergency and told the country to prepare for war. By the first week of December, the conservative print media outlets in the country had published jihad related materials to boost the recruitment in the military.

== Overview ==
=== Initiation ===
On the evening of 3 December, at about 17:35, the Pakistan Air Force (PAF) launched surprise pre-emptive strikes on eight Indian airfields, including Agra, which was 480 kilometres (300 mi) from the border. At the time of the attack, the Taj Mahal had been camouflaged with lots of twigs and leaves and draped with burlap, because its marble glowed prominently in the moonlight. These pre-emptive strikes, known as Operation Chengiz Khan, were inspired by the success of Israeli Operation Focus in the Arab–Israeli Six-Day War. Unlike the Israeli attack on Arab airbases in 1967, which involved a large number of Israeli planes, Pakistan flew too few planes to inflict significant damage.

In an address to the nation on radio that same evening, Prime Minister Gandhi held that the air strikes were a declaration of war against India and the Indian Air Force (IAF) responded with initial air strikes the same night. These expanded to massive retaliatory air strikes the next morning.

This air action marked the start of all-out war; Gandhi ordered the mobilisation of troops and launched a full-scale invasion of East Pakistan. This involved Indian forces in coordinated air, sea and land assaults. The main Indian objective on the eastern front was to capture Dacca, and on the western front to contain Pakistani forces.

=== Ground operations ===
The Indian army was better equipped than the Pakistanis and enjoyed significant numerical superiority over them.

Pakistan launched a ground offensive on the western front. Major ground attacks were concentrated on the western border by the Pakistan Army but the Indian Army was successful in penetrating into Pakistani soil. It eventually made some quick and initial gains, including the capture of around 15,010 km^{2} (5,795 sq mi) of Pakistani territory; this land gained by India in Azad Kashmir, Punjab and Sindh sectors was later ceded in the Simla Agreement of 1972, as a gesture of goodwill.

Casualties inflicted to Pakistan Army's I Corps, II Corps, and Pakistan Marines' Punjab detachment were very high, and many soldiers and marines perished due to lack of operational planning and lack of coordination within the marine-army formations against Indian Army's Southern and Western Commands. By the time the war came to end, the army soldiers and marines were highly demoralised– both emotionally and psychologically– on the western front and had no will to put up a defensive fight against the approaching Indian Army soldiers.

==== Western Front ====
Pakistan's head of the army and the military operations during the war, General Abdul Hamid Khan played a central role in directing Pakistan's Western front campaigns. He oversaw the launch of Operation Chengiz Khan, a preemptive strike on Indian airbases, aimed at crippling Indian airpower and initiating hostilities. Despite extensive planning, the operation inflicted only limited damage. On the Western front, General Hamid Khan commanded key offensives, including the assault towards Ferozepur and ordered the offensive in Chhamb under Major General Iftikhar Janjua, which resulted in territorial gains. He also directed the attempted advance towards Longewala, though this effort was ultimately repelled by Indian forces. Hamid Khan oversaw the II Corps offensive into the Indian state of Punjab. The plan involved advancing from Bahawalnagar towards Bhatinda and Ludhiana. Under his directive, major elements of the 1st Armored Division began mobilization on December 15, 1971. Small advancements were made by Pakistani troops. However, due to subsequent orders to halt movements, the offensive was delayed and ultimately did not proceed before the ceasefire on December 17, 1971. His leadership during the conflict, while marked by bold initiatives, has been subject to scrutiny in post-war analyses.

On 3 December, after the air strike carried out by the PAF, the 106 Infantry Brigade of the Pakistani forces under the command of Brig Mohammad Mumtaz Khan advanced towards the village of Hussainiwala with 2000 troops and artillery support. The Indian side had deployed one battalion, 15 Punjab, under the command of Lt Col Shastry comprising 900 soldiers with support from the IAF. The 15 Punjab could not hold the village and had to retreat on 4 December towards the fortress called Kaiser-i-Hind outside Hussainiwala. The Indian forces were eventually pushed from the fortress as well. The Indian side suffered 125 casualties while the Pakistani forces lost 67 men.

Simultaneously, Pakistani forces began an offensive on Chhamb, similar to the offensive carried out during the Indo-Pakistani war of 1965. The Pakistani 23 Armoured Division under Maj Gen Iftikhar Janjua pushed through the region held by the Indian 10 Division with superior equipment commanded by Maj Gen Jaswant Singh. Till 9 December, the Pakistani commander Maj Gen Janjua perished but the Pakistani forces were able to force the Indian units to retreat by 11 December. Pakistan retained the territory won in this battle after the Simla Agreement.

On 4 December, a Pakistani unit from the 18 Infantry Division commanded by Maj Gen B. M. Mustafa headed by Brig. Tariq Mir and Brig Jahanzeb Abab advanced towards the Rajasthan town of Longewala. The town was held by an outnumbered Infantry Company under Major Kuldip Singh Chandapuri and few border guards but had heavy IAF support. This company held several anti-tank guns, cannons and howitzers. The initial Pakistani armored advance was stalled by the Indian Anti-tank and Anti-Mech defenses from high ground and the Pakistani sappers were also pushed back by Indian small arm and artillery cannon fire. The IAF 122 squadron under the command of Wing Cdr D. M. Conquest equipped with Hawker Hunter and HAL HF-24 Marut also bombed the Pakistani units. By 7 December the Battle of Longewala was decisively won by India.

Pakistani I Corps attempted to cut Indian transport lines between Punjab and Jammu by advancing on the Shakargarh sector on 6 December. Lt Gen Irshad Ahmed Khan commanded two infantry and one armored division into battle. The region was heavily reinforced by the Indian I Corps commanded by Lt Gen Khem Karan Singh holding three infantry divisions, two independent armored brigades and two artillery brigades. The resultant battle raged till the end of the war on 16 December and recorded heavy losses on both sides. Despite being numerically superior than the Indian side, Pakistan failed at capturing the region and the Indian units pushed back and threatened Sialkot. The Battle of Basantar was deemed an Indian victory.

Between 8 and 14 December, India captured an 800 km^{2} stretch of the Karakoram range in the Northern region of Ladakh in the Battle of Turtuk under the command of Col Udai Singh.

==== Eastern Front ====
===== Pre-war operations =====
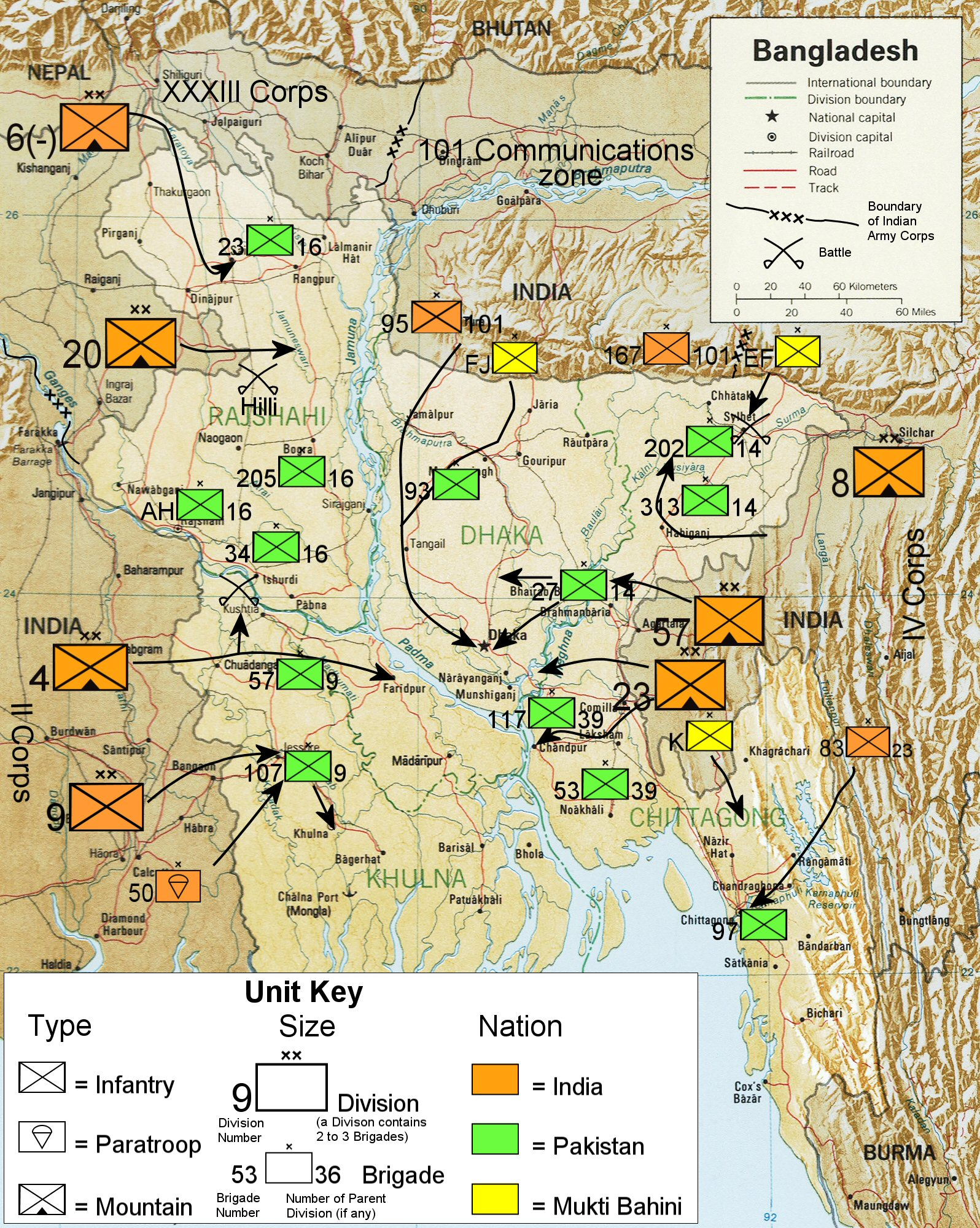
An illustration showing military units and troop movements during operations in the Eastern sector of the war.

Before the official declaration of war between the two countries, Indian army had already been attacking the territory along the border with East Pakistan. This served the purpose of confusing Lt Gen Amir Niazi, the Martial Law Administrator of East Pakistan. These battles fought before the official declaration of war included the Battle of Dhalai, Garibpur, Boyra and Hilli.

On 28 October, Lt Gen Sagat Singh, commander of the IV Corps ordered the advance of Indian forces into the region of Dhalai near Tripura. Three battalions from the Corps fought against the battalion sized deployment of the 12th Frontier Force of Pakistan. The six day battle resulted in an Indian victory and provided for a launch pad for IAF reconnaissance mission into East Pakistan.

On 20 November, 14 tanks and a battalion from the Punjab Regiment under the command of Lieutenant Colonel R. K. Singh launched another attack on the border with East Pakistan. The city of Garibpur was targeted. Defended by a larger force of three battalions under the 107 Infantry Brigade commanded by Brig Mohammad Hayat, the two day battle resulted in heavy Pakistani casualties and an Indian victory. The following day, four Canadair Sabre of the PAF attempted to attack Indian positions in the region and were confronted by four IAF Folland Gnats. This aerial battle resulted in two PAF Sabre's being shot down, one damaged and two pilots captured.

On 22 November, the 8th Guards Battalion under the command of Lieutenant Colonel Shamsher Singh advanced on the mountain position of Hilli. For this objective, the town of Morapara was attacked. In the fierce battle, heavy losses were incurred by the Indian side but by 24 November, Morapara was captured while Hilli remained under Pakistani control.

===== After the declaration of war =====
Contrary to the 1965 war, which had emphasised set-piece battles and slow advances, this time the strategy adopted was a swift, three-pronged assault of nine infantry divisions with attached armoured units and close air support that rapidly converged on Dacca, the capital of East Pakistan. Lieutenant General Jagjit Singh Aurora, the General Officer Commanding-in-Chief of the Indian Army's Eastern Command, led the full Indian thrust into East Pakistan. As the Indian Eastern Command attacked the Pakistan Eastern Command, IAF rapidly destroyed the small air contingent in East Pakistan and put the Dacca airfield out of commission. In the meantime, the Indian Navy effectively blockaded East Pakistan.

Indian 95 Brigade under the command of H. S. Kler and Mukti Bahini forces had laid siege to a border post in the town of Kamalpur since November defended by a platoon of Pakistani paramilitary commandos, but after the declaration of war, with the support of IAF which bombed the town from 3 to 4 December, Brig Kler was able to extract a surrender and Kamalpur was captured.

On 4 December, 5 Gorkha rifles of the 59 Mountain brigade was tasked with capturing the Gazipur tea factory bungalow overlooking the important city of Sylhet. In the late night operation carried out by Major Shyam Kelkar, India was able to force Pakistani forces to retreat despite heavy casualties including Maj Kelkar.

On 7 December, after a major buildup of forces around the city of Sylhet, Lt Gen Sagat Singh ordered the 4/5th battalion of the Gorkha regiment to carry out a heliborne operation under the command of Lt Col A. B. Harolikar. The first wave of attacks was carried out on the same day with a hundred soldiers landed into the city, followed by more after 12 hours. The Indian forces expected the city to have been abandoned by the Pakistani commanders. Contrary to their beliefs, the city was defended by 2 brigades which responded with heavy firing towards the attacking Indian forces. This also caused an interruption in the heliborne operations and limited the access to the Indian forces. These attacks were followed by IAF Hunter air strikes on 11 December. The Pakistani forces under Brig S. A. Hassan raised the white flag on 15 December.

On 9 December, the Indian forces under the 57 Mountain division were tasked with crossing the Meghna river through the Coronation bridge between the town of Ashuganj and Bairab Bazaar. Ashuganj was heavy defended by the Pakistani forces and the following battle resulted in heavy casualties on both sides. The Pakistani 14 Division ordered the destruction of the bridge, allowing for the Pakistani troops to ferry across the Meghna rivier and strengthen the defense of Bhairab Bazaar. The Indian forces were able to cross the Meghna river with the help of local fishing boats and 14 Mil Mi-4 helicopters. By 12 December, the Indian forces had secured the crossing points on the Meghna and had located several battalions across the river. Indian units had also come within artillery range of Dacca.

On 11 December, the 2nd Para regiment battalion carried out the Tangail Airdrop and engaged with the ill-trained Razakars to enable the 1 Maratha light infantry to secure the Poongli bridge over the Jamuna river. This battle was an Indian victory and helped Indian forces close on Dhaka by 12 December. On 13 December, Indian and Mukti Bahini forces attacked the city of Shiromoni. The Indian forces suffered heavy losses at the Badamtola ambush. The battle continued till after the singing of the Instrument of Surrender by the commander of Pakistani forces in East Pakistan, Lt Gen A. A. K. Niazi on 16 December, since the commander of forces in Shiromoni, Brig Hayat Khan insisted on continuing the battle. Brig Khan surrendered to the Indian forces a day later on 17 December.

The Indian campaign's "blitzkrieg" techniques exploited weaknesses in the Pakistani positions and bypassed opposition; this resulted in a swift victory. Faced with insurmountable losses, the Pakistani military capitulated in less than a fortnight and psychological panic spread in the Eastern Command's military leadership. Subsequently, the Indian Army encircled Dacca and issued an ultimatum to surrender in "30-minutes" time window on 16 December 1971. Upon hearing the ultimatum, the East-Pakistan government collapsed when the Lt-Gen. A.A.K. Niazi (Cdr. of Eastern Command) and his deputy, V-Adm. M.S. Khan, surrendered without offering any resistance. On 16 December 1971, the Pakistan Eastern Command surrendered in Dhaka. India announced a unilateral ceasefire on the western front, and hostilities ended on 17 December.

According to CIA estimates, more than 3,500 Indian soldiers and about 5,000 Pakistani soldiers lost their lives, with tens of thousands wounded in total. Another source states that Pakistan suffered around 8,000 killed and 25,000 wounded, while India had 3,000 dead and 12,000 wounded. The loss of armoured vehicles was similarly imbalanced and this finally represented a defeat for Pakistan.

The Indian Army's improved performance following its defeat in the Sino-Indian War in 1962 boosted its morale and prestige.

=== Naval operations ===
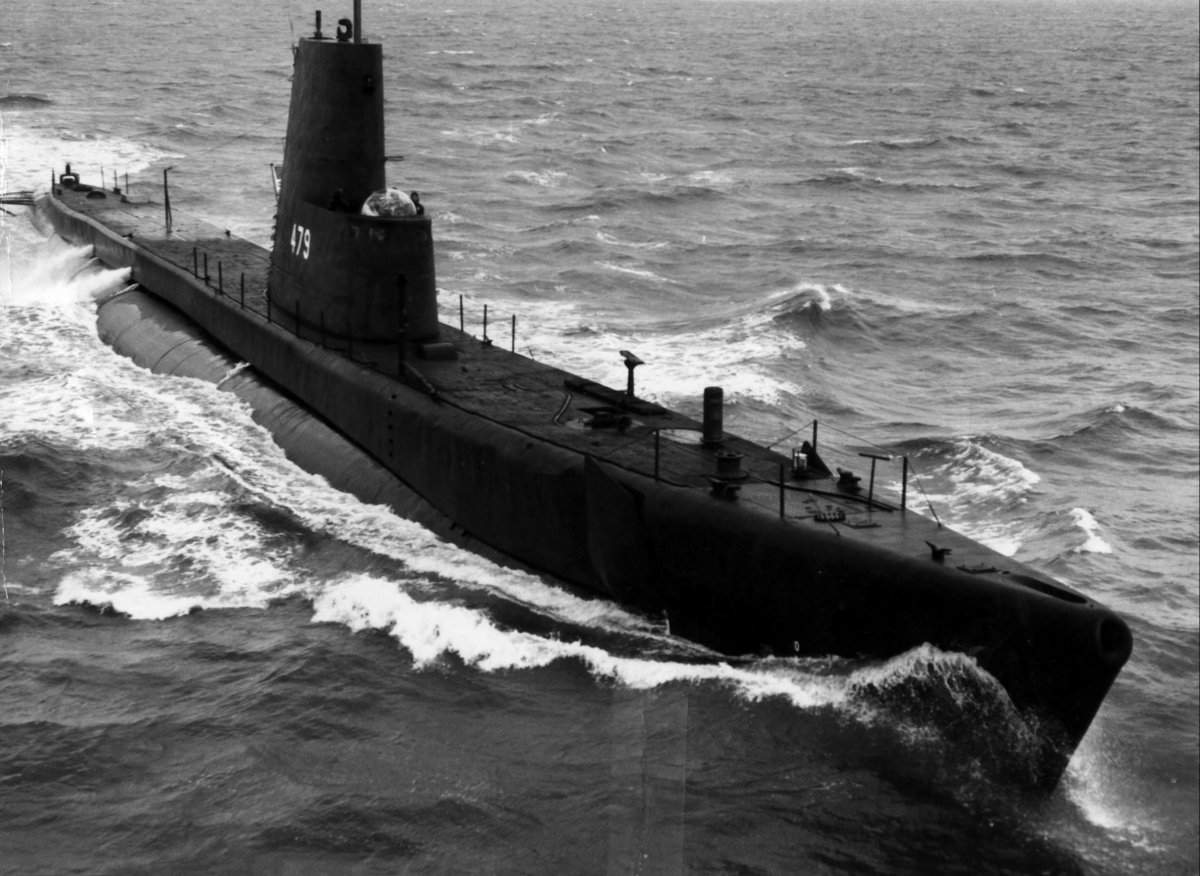
Pakistan's PNS Ghazi sank off the fairway buoy of Visakhapatnam near the eastern coast of India, making it the first submarine casualty in the waters around the Indian subcontinent.

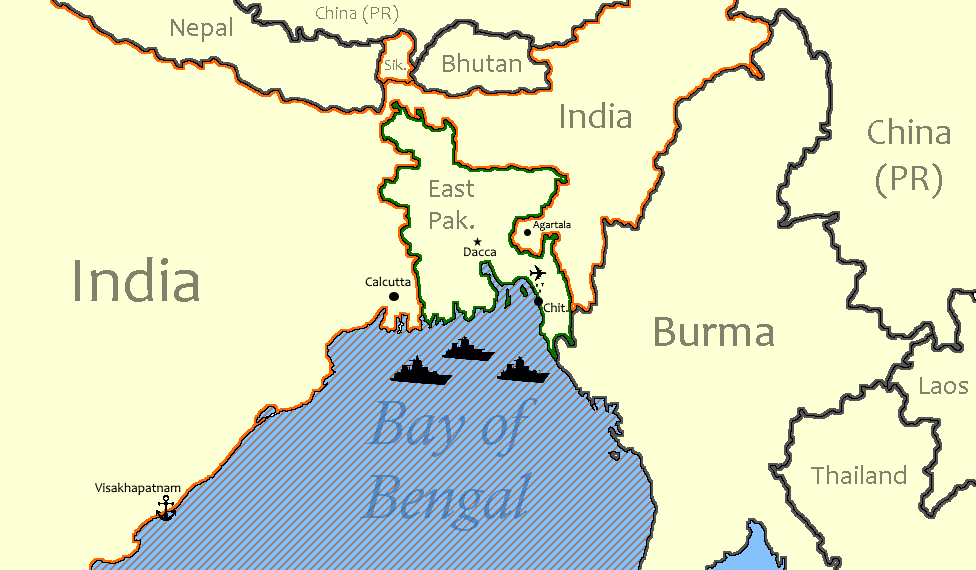
Indian navy had blockaded Pakistan's trade and supply lines in Bay of Bengal in Eastern theatre; Airforce bombed and raided several towns and some cities in East Pakistan.

Navy NHQ staffers and commanders of the Pakistan Navy knew very well that unlike the 1965 war, the Navy was ill-prepared for the naval conflict with India. The Pakistan Navy was in no condition to fight an offensive war in deep water against the Indian Navy, and neither was it in a condition to mount a serious defence against Indian Navy's seaborne encroachment.

In the western theatre of the war, the Indian Navy's Western Naval Command, under Vice admiral S.N. Kohli, successfully launched a surprise attack on the port of Karachi on the night of 4/5 December 1971 under the codename Trident. The naval attack involving the Soviet-built Osa-class missile boats sank the Pakistan Navy's destroyer PNS Khaibar and minesweeper PNS Muhafiz while PNS Shah Jahan was also badly damaged. Pakistani naval sources reported that about 720 Pakistani sailors were killed or wounded, and Pakistan lost reserve fuel and many commercial ships, thus crippling the Pakistan Navy's further involvement in the conflict. Seeking to retaliate, the Pakistan Navy submarines hunted for the major Indian warships. On 9 December 1971, Hangor sank INS Khukri, inflicting 194 Indian casualties, and this attack was the first submarine kill since World War II.

The sinking of INS Khukri was followed by another Indian attack on the port of Karachi on the night of 8/9 December 1971 under the codename Python. A squadron of Indian Navy's Osa missile boats approached the Karachi port and launched a series of Soviet-acquired Styx missiles, that resulted in further destruction of reserve fuel tanks and the sinking of three Pakistani merchant ships, as well as foreign ships docked in Karachi. The PAF did not attack the Indian Navy ships, and confusion remained the next day when the civilian pilots of Pakistan International, acting as reconnaissance war pilots, misidentified PNS Zulfiqar and the air force attacked its own warship, inflicting major damages and killing several officers on board.

In the eastern theatre of the war, the Indian Eastern Naval Command, under Vice Admiral Nilakanta Krishnan, completely isolated East Pakistan by a naval blockade in the Bay of Bengal, trapping the Eastern Pakistan Navy and eight foreign merchant ships in their ports. From 4 December onwards, the aircraft carrier INS Vikrant was deployed, and its Sea Hawk fighter-bombers attacked many coastal towns in East Pakistan, including Chittagong and Cox's Bazar. India also launched an amphibious assault, Operation Beaver, near Cox's Bazar on 14 December 1971 due to unfounded fears of a Pakistani retreat into Burma, Led by "Romeo Force" with 1/3 Gorkha Rifles, the landing failed–only 12 Indian troops managing to disembark out of a battalion, the area was held by Pakistani regular troops. Pakistan countered the threat by sending the submarine PNS Ghazi, which sank off the coast of Visakhapatnam, due to an internal explosion, though whether this was triggered by Indian depth charges, diving to avoid them or some other reason has never been established.

Due to a high number of defections, the Navy relied on deploying the Pakistan Marines, led by Rear Admiral Leslie Mungavin, where they had to conduct riverine operations against the Indian Army, but they too suffered major losses, mainly due to their lack of understanding of expeditionary warfare and the wet terrain of East Pakistan.

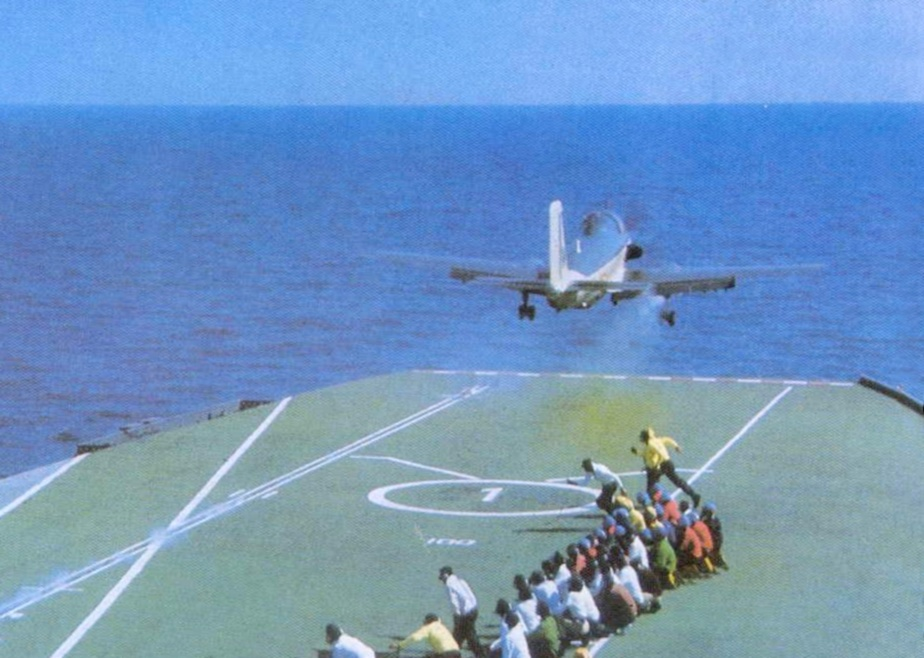
Indian aircraft carrier INS Vikrant launches an Alize aircraft

The damage inflicted on the Pakistan Navy stood at 7 gunboats, 1 minesweeper, 1 submarine, 2 destroyers, 3 patrol crafts belonging to the Pakistan Coast Guard, 18 cargo, supply and communication vessels; and large-scale damage inflicted on the naval base and docks in the coastal town of Karachi. Three merchant navy ships – Anwarbaksh, Pasni and Madhumathi – and ten smaller vessels were captured. Around 1900 personnel were lost, while 1413 servicemen were captured by Indian forces in Dacca. According to one Pakistani scholar, Tariq Ali, Pakistan lost half its navy in the war.

=== Air operations ===
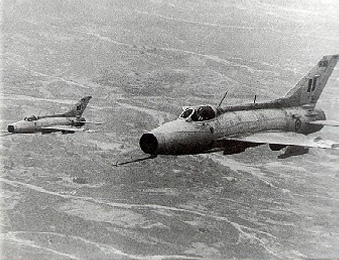
Indian Air Force MiG-21s during the war.

After the attempted pre-emptive attack, the PAF adopted a defensive stance in response to the Indian retaliation. As the war progressed, the IAF continued to battle the PAF over conflict zones, but the number of sorties flown by the PAF decreased day–by–day. The IAF flew 4,000 sorties while the PAF offered little in retaliation, partly because of the paucity of non-Bengali technical personnel.

This lack of retaliation has also been attributed to the deliberate decision of the PAF's AHQ to cut its losses, as it had already incurred huge losses in the conflict in the liberation war in the East. The PAF avoided making contacts with the Indian Navy after the latter raided the port of Karachi twice, but the PAF did retaliate by bombing Okha harbour, destroying the fuel tanks used by the boats that had attacked.

In the east, No. 14 Squadron "Tail Choppers" was destroyed and its CO, Squadron Leader PQ Mehdi, was taken POW, putting Pakistan's air command in Dhaka out of commission. India thereby achieved total air superiority on the eastern front.

At the end of the war, PAF pilots made successful escapes from East Pakistan to neighbouring Burma; many PAF personnel had already left the East for Burma on their own before Dacca was overrun by the Indian military in December 1971.

=== Indian attacks on Pakistan ===
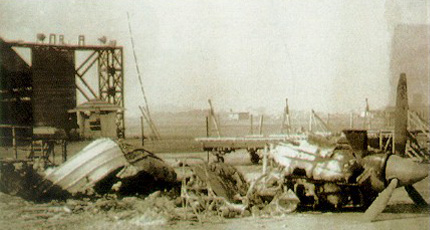
A destroyed aircraft hangar at Dacca airfield after an Indian air attack.

As the Indian Army tightened its grip in East Pakistan, the IAF continued with its attacks against Pakistan as the campaign developed into a series of daylight anti-airfield, anti-radar, and close-support attacks by fighter jets, with night attacks against airfields and strategic targets by Canberras and An-12s, while Pakistan responded with similar night attacks with its B-57s and C-130s.

The PAF deployed its F-6s mainly on defensive combat air patrol missions over their own bases, leaving the PAF unable to conduct effective offensive operations. The IAF's raids damaged one USAF and one UN aircraft in Dacca, while a RCAF DHC-4 Caribou was destroyed in Islamabad, along with the USAF's Beech U-8 owned by the US military's liaison chief Brigadier-General Chuck Yeager. Sporadic raids by the IAF continued against PAF forward air bases in Pakistan until the end of the war, and interdiction and close-support operations were maintained.

One of the most successful air raids by India into West Pakistan happened on 8 December 1971, when Indian Hunter aircraft from the Pathankot-based 20 Squadron, attacked the Pakistani base in Murid and destroyed 5 F-86 aircraft on the ground. This was confirmed by Pakistan's military historian, Air Commodore M Kaiser Tufail, in his book In The Ring and on Its Feet: Pakistan Air Force in the 1971 Indo-Pak War.

The PAF played a more limited role in the operations. They were reinforced by Mirages from an unidentified Middle Eastern ally (whose identity remains unknown). According to author Martin Bowman, "Libyan F-5s were reportedly deployed to Sargodha AFB, perhaps as a potential training unit to prepare Pakistani pilots for an influx of more F-5s from Saudi Arabia." The IAF was able to conduct a wide range of missions – troop support; air combat; deep penetration strikes; para-dropping behind enemy lines; feints to draw enemy fighters away from the actual target; bombing and reconnaissance. The PAF, which was solely focused on air combat, was blown out of the subcontinent's skies within the first week of the war. Those PAF aircraft that survived took refuge at Iranian air bases or in concrete bunkers, refusing to offer a fight.

India flew 1,978 sorties in the East and about 4,000 in Pakistan, while the PAF flew about 30 and 2,840 at the respective fronts. By the end of the war, India had lost 45–65 aircraft while Pakistan lost 75.

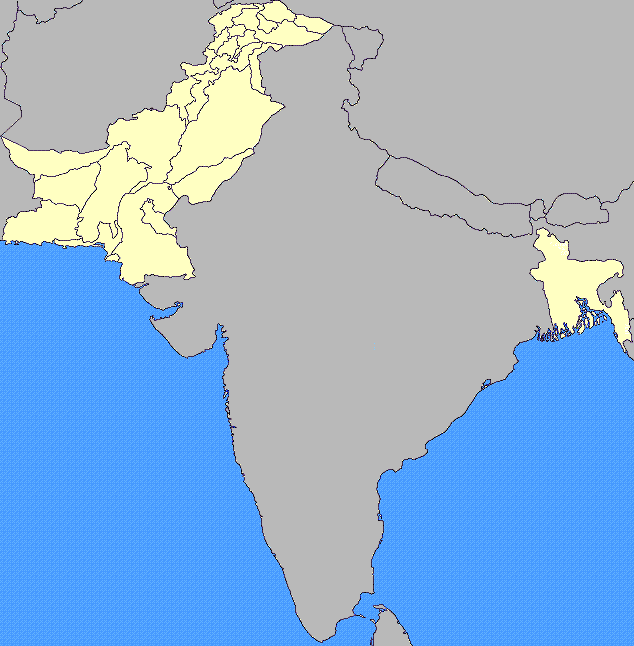
The map shows Pakistan and East Pakistan; between them was 1,600 km (1,000 mi) of Indian territory.

The Indian T-55 tanks penetrating the Indo-East Pakistan border towards Dacca.

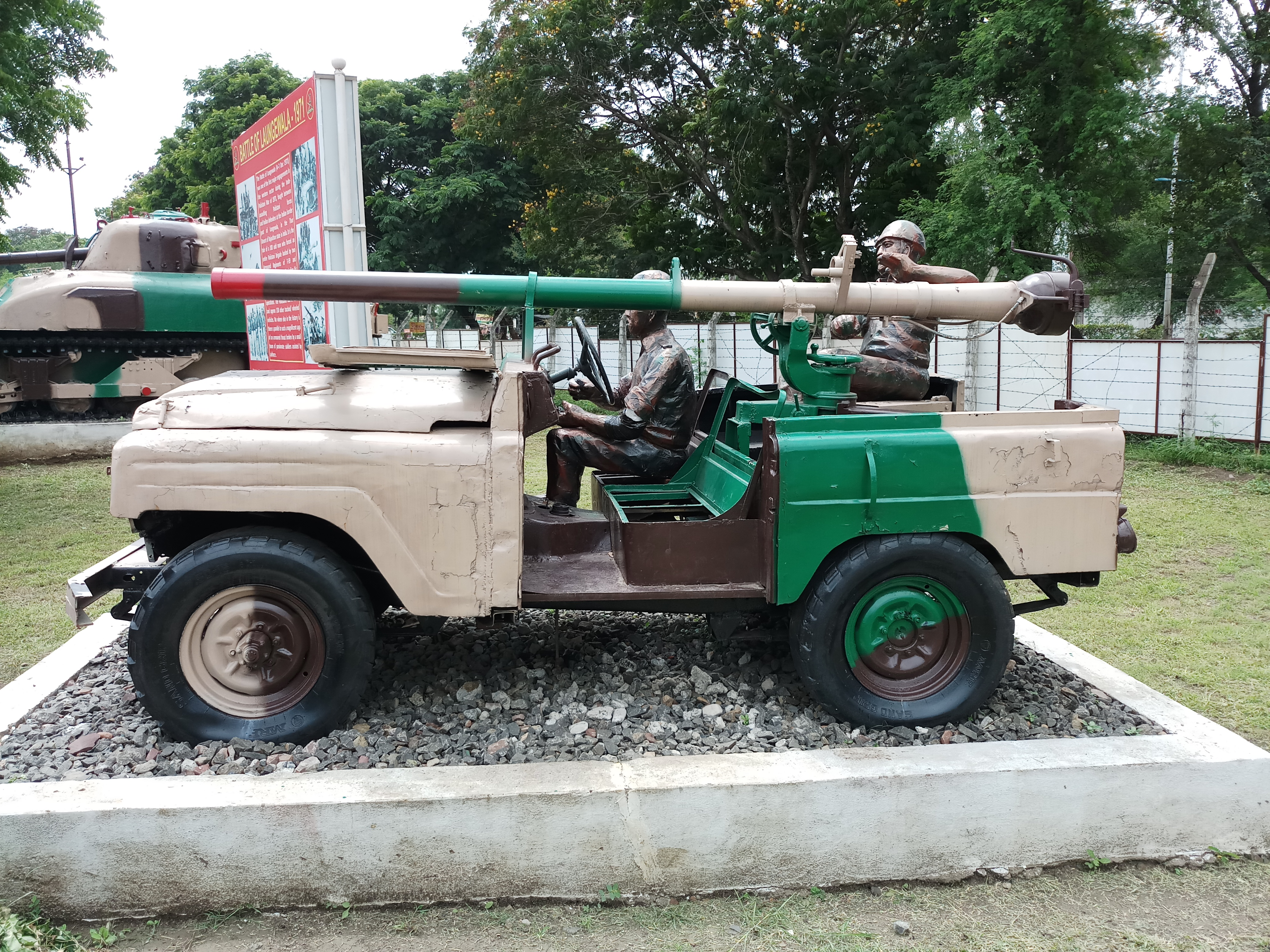
105 mm Jonga-mounted RCL gun which destroyed most of the tanks during the Battle of Longewala

=== Surrender of Pakistan Eastern Command ===
The Instrument of Surrender of Pakistan Eastern Command stationed in East Pakistan was signed between Lieutenant General Jagjit Singh Aurora, the GOC-in-C of Indian Eastern Command, and Lieutenant-General A.A.K. Niazi, the Commander of the Pakistan Eastern Command, at the Ramna Race Course in Dacca at 16:31Hrs IST on 16 December 1971. There was a problem over who would represent the Bangladesh government, as the three Bangladeshi battalion commanders - Lt Cols Shafiullah, Khaled Musharraf and Ziaur Rahman - were located too far away to be airlifted on time. The responsibility fell on the only armed forces officer available, Gp Capt AK Khondkar, chief of the newly formed BAF. As the surrender was accepted silently by Lieutenant-General Aurora, the surrounding crowds on the race course started shouting anti-Pakistan slogans, and there were reports of abuses aimed at the surrendering commanders of Pakistani military. Indian officers and an Indian diplomat, MEA joint secretary for Pakistan AK Ray, had to form a human chain around Lt Gen Niazi to protect him from being lynched.

Hostilities officially ended at 14:30 GMT on 17 December, after the surrender on 16 December, and India claimed large gains of territory in Pakistan (although pre-war boundaries were recognised after the war). The war confirmed the independence of Bangladesh.

Following the surrender, the Indian Army took approximately 90,000 Pakistani servicemen and their Bengali supporters as POWs, making it the largest surrender since World War II. Initial counts recorded that approximately 79,676 war prisoners were uniformed personnel, and the overwhelming majority of the war prisoners were officers – most of them from the army and navy, while relatively small numbers were from the air force and marines; others in larger number were serving in paramilitary units.

The remaining prisoners were civilians who were either family members of the military personnel or volunteers (razakars). The Hamoodur Rahman Commission and the POW Investigation Commission reports instituted by Pakistan lists the Pakistani POWs as given in the table below. Apart from soldiers, it was estimated that 15,000 Bengali civilians were also made prisoners of war.

Inter-service branch	Number of captured Pakistani POWs	Officer commanding
Pakistan Army	54,154	Lieutenant-General Amir Abdullah Khan Niazi
Pakistan Navy/Pakistan Marines	1,381	Rear-Admiral Mohammad Shariff
Pakistan Air Force	833	Air Commodore Inamul Haq
Paramilitary (East Pakistan Rifles/Police)	22,000	Major-General Rao Farman Ali
Civil government personnel	12,000	Governor Abdul Motaleb Malik
Total:	90,368	~

== Foreign reaction and involvement ==
=== United States and Soviet Union ===
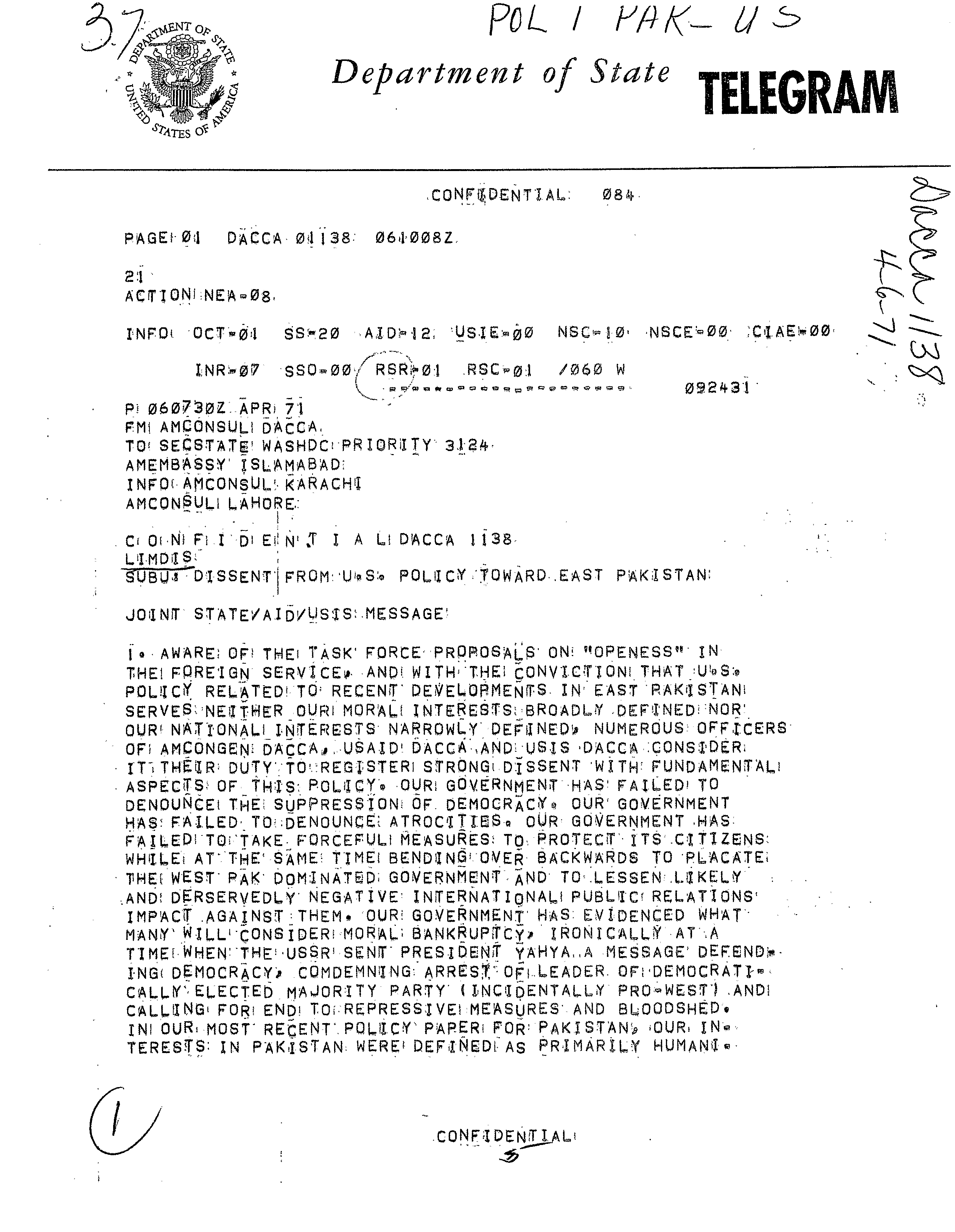
The Blood Telegram

The Soviet Union sympathised with the East Pakistanis, and supported the Indian Army and Mukti Bahini's incursion against Pakistan during the war, in a broader view of recognising that the secession of East Pakistan as Independent Bangladesh would weaken the position of its rivals— the United States and China. The Soviet Union gave assurances to India that if a confrontation with the United States or China developed, it would take counter-measures. This assurance was enshrined in the Indo-Soviet Treaty of Friendship and Cooperation signed in August 1971.

The Soviet Union accepted the Indian position that any resolution to the crisis in East Pakistan would have to be on terms acceptable to India and the Awami League, but the Indo-Soviet treaty did not mean a total commitment to the Indian stance, according to author Robert Jackson. The Soviet Union continued economic aid to Pakistan and made sympathetic gestures to Pakistan until mid-October 1971. By November 1971, the Soviet ambassador to Pakistan Alexei Rodionov directed a secretive message (Rodionov message) that ultimately warned Pakistan that "it will be embarking on a suicidal course if it escalates tensions in the subcontinent".

The United States stood with Pakistan by supporting it morally, politically, economically and materially when U.S. President Richard Nixon and his Secretary of State Henry Kissinger refused to use rhetoric in a hopeless attempt to intervene in a large civil war. The U.S. establishment had the impression that the Soviets were in an informal alliance with India, and the US therefore needed Pakistan to help to limit Soviet influence in South Asia. During the Cold War, Pakistan was a close formal ally of the United States and also had close relations with the People's Republic of China, with whom Nixon had been negotiating a rapprochement and where he intended to visit in February 1972. Nixon feared that an Indian invasion of Pakistan would mean total Soviet domination of the region, and that it would seriously undermine the global position of the United States and the regional position of America's new tactical ally, China. Nixon encouraged Iran to send military supplies to Pakistan. The Nixon administration also ignored reports it received of the "genocidal" activities of the Pakistani military in East Pakistan, most notably the Blood telegram, and this prompted widespread criticism and condemnation – both by the United States Congress and in the international press. Nixon himself stated, "Biafra stirred up a few Catholics. But you know, I think Biafra stirred people up more than Pakistan, because Pakistan they're just a bunch of brown goddamn Moslems."

Then U.S. Ambassador to the United Nations, George H. W. Bush, introduced a resolution in the UN Security Council calling for a cease-fire and the withdrawal of armed forces by India and Pakistan. However, it was vetoed by the Soviet Union, and the following days witnessed the use of great pressure on the Soviets from the Nixon-Kissinger duo to get India to withdraw, but to no avail.

On 10 December, Nixon ordered Task Force 74, led by the aircraft carrier USS Enterprise, to the Bay of Bengal. Enterprise and its escort ships arrived on station on 15 December 1971. According to a Russian documentary, the United Kingdom also deployed a carrier battle group led by the aircraft carrier HMS Eagle to the Bay, on her final deployment.

On 6 and 13 December, the Soviet Navy dispatched two groups of cruisers and destroyers from Vladivostok; they trailed US Task Force 74 into the Indian Ocean from 18 December 1971 until 7 January 1972. The Soviets also had a nuclear submarine to help ward off the threat posed by the USS Enterprise task force in the Indian Ocean.

As the war progressed, it became apparent to the United States that India was going to invade and disintegrate Pakistan in a matter of weeks, therefore President Nixon spoke with the USSR General Secretary Leonid Brezhnev on a hotline on 10 December, where Nixon reportedly urged Brezhnev to restrain India as he quoted: "in the strongest possible terms to restrain India with which ... you [Brezhnev] have great influence and for whose actions you must share responsibility."

After the war, the United States accepted the new balance of power and recognised India as a dominant player in South Asia; the US immediately engaged in strengthening bilateral relations between the two countries in the successive years. In June 1972, Soviet Ambassador Rodionov said, "the Soviet Union had always stood and would stand for the unity and territorial integrity of Pakistan". The USSR aided Pakistan economically on several technical and industrial projects.

A 2019 study argues "that Nixon and Kissinger routinely demonstrated psychological biases that led them to overestimate the likelihood of West Pakistani victory" in the war, and that they overestimated "the importance of the crisis to broader U.S. policy. The evidence fails to support Nixon and Kissinger's own framing of the 1971 crisis as a contest between cool-headed realpolitik and idealistic humanitarianism, and instead shows that Kissinger and Nixon's policy decisions harmed their stated goals because of repeated decision-making errors."

=== China ===
During the course of the war, China harshly criticised India for its involvement in the East Pakistan crises, and accused India of having imperialistic designs in South Asia. Before the war started, Chinese leaders and officials had long been philosophically advising the Pakistan government to make peaceful political settlements with the East Pakistani leaders, as China feared that India was secretly supporting, infiltrating, and arming the Bengali rebels against the East Pakistani government. China was also critical of the Government of East Pakistan, led by its governor Lieutenant-General Tikka Khan, which used ruthless measures to deal with the Bengali opposition, and did not endorse the Pakistani position on that issue.

When the war started, China reproached India for its direct involvement and infiltration in East Pakistan. It disagreed with Pakistani President Yahya Khan's consideration of military options, and criticised East Pakistan Awami League politicians' ties with India. China reacted with great alarm when the prospects of Indian invasion of Pakistan and integration of Pakistan-administered Kashmir into their side of Kashmir, became imminent. US President Nixon encouraged China to mobilise its armed forces along its border with India to discourage the Indian assault, but the Chinese did not respond to this encouragement since the Indian Army's Northern Command was well prepared to guard the Line of Actual Control, and was already engaging and making advances against the Pakistan Army's X Corps in the Line of Control.

China did not welcome the break-up of Pakistan's unity by the East Pakistani politicians, and effectively vetoed the membership of Bangladesh when it applied to the United Nations in 1972. China objected to admitting Bangladesh on the grounds that two UN resolutions concerning Bangladesh, requiring the repatriation of Pakistani POWs and civilians, had not yet been implemented. Furthermore, China refused to recognise the independence of Bangladesh until 31 August 1975. To this date, its relations with Bangladesh are determined by the Pakistan factor.

=== Ceylon ===
Ceylon (modern-day Sri Lanka) saw the partition of Pakistan as an example for themselves and feared India might use its enhanced power against them in the future. The left-wing government of Sirimavo Bandaranaike following a neutral non-aligned foreign policy. As Pakistani aircraft could not fly over Indian territory, they would have to take a longer route around India and so they stopped at Bandaranaike Airport in Sri Lanka where they were refuelled before flying to East Pakistan. This decision did not strain relations between Ceylon and India.

=== Arab World ===
As many Arab countries were allied with both the United States and Pakistan, it was easy for Kissinger to encourage them to participate. He sent letters to both, the King of Jordan and the King of Saudi Arabia. President Nixon gave permission for Jordan to send ten F-104s and promised to provide replacements. F-86s from Saudi Arabia helped camouflage the extent of PAF losses, and some Libyan F-5s were reportedly deployed to Sargodha AFB, perhaps as a potential training unit to prepare Pakistani pilots for an influx of more F-5s from Saudi Arabia. In addition to these three countries, an unidentified Middle Eastern ally also supplied Pakistan with Mirage IIIs.

=== Israel ===
Despite not having diplomatic relations at the time, Israel supplied India with armaments, ammunition, intelligence and training ahead of its intervention in East Pakistan, which has been described as a "surprising minor success" of India's efforts to garner international support. In July 1971 Golda Meir, Israel's prime minister, got Israeli arms manufacturer Shlomo Zabludowicz to provide India and the Mukti Bahini with mortars, ammunition and instructors. Meir reportedly sought diplomatic ties with India in exchange, which were finally established in 1992 under P. V. Narasimha Rao.

== Aftermath ==
=== Territorial changes ===
In the western front (present-day India-Pakistan border), both countries sparred indecisively. By the end of the war, India had captured a larger quantity of territory than Pakistan. The majority of territory India held was mostly barren, sandy desert in Sindh which did not dent Pakistan's economy or harm its political standing in Sindh but greatly affected the morale of Pakistan. On the other hand, although smaller in quantity, the Indian territory captured by Pakistan in Punjab had significantly greater economic value. After the ceasefire on 17 December, both sides attempted to take back lost territory. On 17 December, India's 51 Para brigade launched a successful but costly attack on a sand dune occupied by an intruding Pakistani platoon, which cost the Indian unit 21 killed and 60 wounded. In May 1972, as the snow melted, Pakistan attacked the Lipa Valley, where the heavily outnumbered Indian forces fell back, with both sides suffering heavy casualties as well as Pakistani forces losing their senior commander. Pakistan would launch similar attacks to attempt to regain lost territory at Minimarg Lake and Turtuk.

Subsequently, in 1972, India and Pakistan signed the Simla Agreement, after which both sides would retain territory they captured in Kashmir and demarcate the Line of Control, while the international border would return to its pre-war limits.

Since the end of the war, India continues to retain control over the regions such as Chalunka, Thang, Turtuk, Takshi and Pachtang meanwhile Pakistan retain control on Chumb.

=== India ===
The war and subsequent independence of Bangladesh stripped Pakistan of more than half of its population, and with nearly one-third of its army in captivity, clearly established India's military and political dominance of the subcontinent. India successfully led a diplomatic campaign to isolate Pakistan. On state visits to the United Kingdom and France, Prime Minister Indira Gandhi convinced them to break with their ally the United States and block any pro-Pakistan resolution in the United Nations.

The victory also defined India's much broader role in foreign politics, as many countries in the world had come to realise – including the United States – that the balance of power had shifted to India as a major player in the region. In the wake of changing geopolitical realities, India sought to establish closer relations with regional countries such as Iran, which was a traditional ally of Pakistan. The United States itself accepted a new balance of power, and when India conducted a surprise nuclear test in 1974, the US notified India that it had no "interest in actions designed to achieve new balance of power."

In announcing the Pakistani surrender, Prime Minister Indira Gandhi declared in the Indian Parliament:

Dacca is now the free capital of a free country. We hail the people of Bangladesh in their hour of triumph. All nations who value the human spirit will recognise it as a significant milestone in man's quest for liberty.

Colonel John Gill of National Defense University, US, remarks that, while India achieved a military victory, it was not able to reap the political fruits it might have hoped for in Bangladesh. After a brief 'honeymoon' phase between India and Bangladesh, their relationship began to sour. The perceived Indian overstay revived Bangladeshi anxieties of Hindu control. Many were concerned that Mujib was permitting Indian interference in the country's internal matters and many in the Bangladeshi army resented his attachment with India. Whilst India enjoyed excellent relations with Bangladesh during the Awami League tenures, relations deteriorated when the Bangladesh Nationalist Party assumed power. A 2014 Pew Research Center opinion poll found that 27% of Bangladeshis were wary of India. However, 70% of Bangladeshis held a positive view of India: while 50% of Bangladeshis held a positive view of Pakistan.

=== Pakistan ===
For Pakistan, the war was a complete and humiliating defeat, a psychological setback that came from a defeat at the hands of rival India. Pakistan lost half its population and a significant portion of its economy, and suffered setbacks to its geopolitical role in South Asia. In the post-war era, Pakistan struggled to absorb the lessons learned from the military interventions in the democratic system and the impact of the Pakistani military's failure was grave and long-lasting.

Pakistani officials and historians describe the Indian actions as foreign intervention, while India and Bangladesh describe it as a response to the refugee crisis and the killings. Pakistani policy-makers further feared that the two-nation theory had been disproved by the war, that Muslim nationalism had proved insufficient to keep Bengalis a part of Pakistan.

The Pakistani people were not mentally prepared to accept the magnitude of this kind of defeat, as the state media had been projecting imaginary victories. When the ceasefire that came from the surrender of East Pakistan was finally announced, the people could not come to terms with the magnitude of defeat; spontaneous demonstrations and massive protests erupted on the streets of major metropolitan cities in Pakistan. According to Pakistani historians, the trauma was extremely severe, and the cost of the war for Pakistan in monetary terms and in human resources was very high. Demoralized and finding itself unable to control the situation, the Yahya administration fell when President Yahya Khan turned over his presidency to Zulfikar Ali Bhutto, who was sworn in on 20 December 1971 as President with the control of the military. The loss of East Pakistan shattered the prestige of the Pakistani military. Pakistan lost half its navy, a quarter of its air force, and a third of its army. The war also exposed the shortcomings of Pakistan's declared strategic doctrine that the "defence of East Pakistan lay in West Pakistan". Hussain Haqqani, in his book Pakistan: Between Mosque and Military notes,

Moreover, the army had failed to fulfill its promises of fighting until the last man. The eastern command had laid down arms after losing only thirteen hundred men in battle. In West Pakistan, too, twelve hundred military deaths had accompanied lackluster military performance.

In his book The 1971 Indo-Pak War: A Soldier's Narrative, Pakistan Army's Major General Hakeem Arshad Qureshi, a veteran of this conflict, noted:

We must accept the fact that, as a people, we had also contributed to the bifurcation of our own country. It was not a Niazi, or a Yahya, even a Mujib, or a Bhutto, or their key assistants, who alone were the cause of our break-up, but a corrupted system and a flawed social order that our own apathy had allowed to remain in place for years. At the most critical moment in our history we failed to check the limitless ambitions of individuals with dubious antecedents and to thwart their selfish and irresponsible behaviour. It was our collective 'conduct' that had provided the enemy an opportunity to dismember us.

— Qureshi, p. 288

After the war, the Pakistan Army's generals in the East held each other responsible for the atrocities committed, but most of the burden was laid on Lieutenant-General Tikka Khan, who earned notoriety from his actions as governor of the East; he was called the "Butcher of Bengal" because of the widespread atrocities committed within the areas of his responsibility. Tikka was a "soldier known for his eager use of force".

Lieutenant-General A. A. K. Niazi commented on Tikka's actions: "On the night between 25/26 March 1971, General Tikka struck. Peaceful night was turned into a time of wailing, crying and burning. General Tikka let loose everything at his disposal as if raiding an enemy, not dealing with his own misguided and misled people. The military action was a display of stark cruelty more merciless than the massacres at Bukhara and Baghdad by Chengiz Khan and Halaku Khan ... General Tikka ... resorted to the killing of civilians and a scorched earth policy. His orders to his troops were: 'I want the land and not the people'". Major-General Rao Farman wrote in his table diary: "Green land of East Pakistan will be painted red," which has been interpreted to mean that he planned to massacre Bengalis. Farman said the entry was not expressing a thirst for blood, but concern that East Pakistan's future could be the red flag of Communism.

Major reforms were carried out by successive governments in Pakistan after the war. To address the economic disparity, the National Finance Commission system was established to equally distribute the taxation revenue among the four provinces, the large-scale nationalisation of industries and nationwide census were carried out in 1972. The Constitution was promulgated in 1973 that reflected this equal balance and a compromise between Islamism and Humanism, and provided guaranteed equal human rights to all. The military was heavily reconstructed and heavily reorganised, with President Bhutto appointing chiefs of staff in each inter-service, contrary to C-in-Cs, and making instruction on human rights compulsory in the military syllabus in each branch of inter-services. Major investments were directed towards modernising the navy. The military's chain of command was centralized in Joint Staff Headquarters (JS HQ) led by an appointed Chairman Joint Chiefs Committee to coordinate military efforts to safeguard the nation's defence and unity. In addition, Pakistan sought to have a diversified foreign policy, as Pakistani geostrategists had been shocked that both China and the United States provided limited support to Pakistan during the course of the war, with the US displaying an inability to supply weapons that Pakistan needed the most.

In January 1972, Pakistan under Bhutto launched the clandestine development of nuclear weapons with a view to "never allow another foreign invasion of Pakistan."

=== Bangladesh ===
As a result of the war, East Pakistan became an independent country, Bangladesh, as the world's fourth most populous Muslim state on 16 December 1971. West Pakistan, now just Pakistan, secured the release of Sheikh Mujibur Rahman from the Headquarter Prison and allowed him to return to Dacca. On 19 January 1972, Mujib was inaugurated as the first President of Bangladesh, later becoming the Prime Minister of Bangladesh in 1974.

On the brink of defeat in around 14 December 1971, the media reports indicated that the Pakistan Army soldiers, the local East Pakistan Police they controlled, razakars and the Shanti Committee carried out systematic killings of professionals such as physicians, teachers, and other intellectuals, as part of a pogrom against the Bengali Hindu minorities who constituted the majority of urban educated intellectuals. This massacre of Hindus was confirmed by the Pakistani military brass in a postwar judicial inquiry.

Young men, especially students, who were seen as possible rebels and recruiters were also targeted by the stationed military, but the extent of casualties in East Pakistan is not known, and the issue is itself controversial and contradictory among the authors who wrote books on the pogrom; the Pakistani government denied the charges of involvement in 2015. R.J. Rummel cites estimates ranging from one to three million people killed. Other estimates place the death toll lower, at 300,000. Bangladesh government figures state that Pakistani forces aided by collaborators killed three million people, raped 200,000 women and displaced millions of others.

According to authors Kenton Worcester, Sally Bermanzohn and Mark Ungar, Bengalis themselves killed about 150,000 non-Bengalis living in the East. There had been reports of Bengali insurgents indiscriminately killing non-Bengalis throughout the East; however, neither side provided substantial proofs for their claims and both Bangladeshi and Pakistani figures contradict each other over this issue. Bihari representatives in June 1971 claimed a higher figure of 500,000 killed by Bengalis.

In 2010, the Awami League's government decided to set up a tribunal to prosecute the people involved in alleged war crimes and those who collaborated with Pakistan. According to the government, the defendants would be charged with crimes against humanity, genocide, murder, rape and arson.

According to John H. Gill, there was widespread polarisation between pro-Pakistan Bengalis and pro-liberation Bengalis during the war, and those internal battles are still playing out in the domestic politics of modern-day Bangladesh. To this day, the issue of committed atrocities and pogroms is an influential factor in the Bangladesh–Pakistan relations.

== Impact ==
=== Pakistan: War Enquiry Commission and War prisoners ===
In the aftermath of the war, the Pakistani Government constituted the War Enquiry Commission, to be headed by Chief Justice Hamoodur Rahman, who was an ethnic Bengali, and composed of the senior justices of the Supreme Court of Pakistan. The War Enquiry Commission was mandated with carrying out thorough investigations into the intelligence, strategic, political and military failures that causes the defeat in the war.

The War Commission also looked into Pakistan's political and military involvement in the history of East Pakistan that encompasses 1947–71. Written in moral and philosophical perspective, the First Report was lengthy and provided accounts that were unpalatable to be released to the public. Initially, there were 12 copies that were all destroyed, except for the one that was kept and marked as "Top Secret" to prevent the backlash effects on the demoralised military. In 1976, the Supplementary Report was submitted, which was the comprehensive report compiled together with the First Report; this report was also marked as classified.

In 2000, the excerpts of the Supplementary Report were leaked to a political correspondent of Pakistan's Dawn, which the Dawn published together with India Today. The First Report is still marked as classified, while the Supplementary Report's excerpts were suppressed by the news correspondents. The War Report's supplementary section was published by the Pakistan Government, but it did not officially hand over the report to Bangladesh despite its requests.

The War Report exposed many military failures, from the strategic to the tactical–intelligence levels, while it confirmed the looting, rapes and the unnecessary killings by the Pakistan military and their local agents. It laid the blame squarely on Pakistan Army generals, accusing them of debauchery, smuggling, war crimes and neglect of duty. The War Commission had recommended public trial of Pakistan Army generals on the charges that they had been responsible for the situation in the first place and that they had succumbed without a fight, but no actions were ever taken against those responsible, except the dismissal of chiefs of the Pakistan Army, Pakistan Air Force, Pakistan Navy, and decommissioning of the Pakistan Marines.

The War Commission, however, rejected the charge that 200,000 Bengali girls were raped by the Pakistan Army, remarking, "It is clear that the figures mentioned by the Dacca authorities are altogether fantastic and fanciful," and cited the evidence of a British abortion team that had carried out the termination of "only a hundred or more pregnancies". The commission also claimed that "approximately 26,000 persons (were) killed during the action by the Pakistan military" Bina D'Costa states that the War Commission was aware of the military's brutality in East Pakistan, but "chose to downplay the scale of the atrocities committed."

The second commission was known as Indo-Pakistani War of 1971 Prisoners of War Investigation, conducted solely by the Pakistani government, that was to determine the numbers of Pakistani military personnel who surrendered, including the number of civilian POWs. The official number of the surrendered military personnel was soon released by the government of Pakistan after the war was over.

=== India: Indo-Pakistani summits ===
On 2 July 1972, the Indo-Pakistani summit was held in Simla, Himachal Pradesh, India where the Simla Agreement was reached and signed between President Zulfikar Ali Bhutto and Prime Minister Indira Gandhi. The treaty provided insurance to Bangladesh that Pakistan recognised Bangladesh's sovereignty, in exchange for the return of the Pakistani POWs. Over the next five months, India released more than 90,000 war prisoners, with Lieutenant-General A.A.K. Niazi being the last war prisoner to be handed over to Pakistan.

The treaty also gave back more than 13,000 km^{2} of land that the Indian Army had seized in Pakistan during the war, though India retained a few strategic areas, including Turtuk, Dhothang, Tyakshi (earlier called Tiaqsi) and Chalunka of Chorbat Valley, which was more than 883 km^{2}. The Indian hardliners, however, felt that the treaty had been too lenient to President Bhutto, who had pleaded for leniency, arguing that the fragile stability in Pakistan would crumble if the accord was perceived as being overly harsh by Pakistanis and that he would be accused of losing Kashmir in addition to the loss of East Pakistan. As a result, Prime Minister Gandhi was criticised by a section in India for believing Bhutto's "sweet talk and false vows", while the other section claimed the agreement to be successful, for not letting it to fall into "Versailles Syndrome" trap.

In 1973, India and Pakistan reached another compromise when both countries signed a trilateral agreement with Bangladesh that actually brought the war prisoners, non-Bengali and Pakistan-loyal Bengali bureaucrats and civilian servants to Pakistan. The Delhi Agreement witnessed the largest mass population transfer since the Partition of India in 1947.

=== Bangladesh: International Crimes Tribunal ===
In 2009, the issue of establishing the International Crimes Tribunal began to take public support. The tribunal was formally established in 2010 to investigate and prosecute suspects for the genocide committed in 1971 by the Pakistan Army and their local collaborators, Razakars, Al-Badr and Al-Shams during the Bangladesh Liberation War.

== Long-term consequences ==
- Steve Coll, in his book Ghost Wars, argues that the Pakistan military's experience with India, including Pervez Musharraf's experience in 1971, influenced the Pakistani government to support jihadist groups in Afghanistan even after the Soviets left, because the jihadists were a tool to use against India, including bogging down the Indian Army in Kashmir.
- Writing about the war in Foreign Affairs magazine, Zulfikar Ali Bhutto stated "There is no parallel in contemporary history to the cataclysm which engulfed Pakistan in 1971. A tragic civil war, which rent asunder the people of the two parts of Pakistan, was seized by India as an opportunity for armed intervention. The country was dismembered, its economy shattered and the nation's self-confidence totally undermined." Her view was contradicted by the post-War Hamoodur Rahman Commission (main report, 1972), ordered by Bhutto himself, which in its supplementary report (1974) indicted generals of the Pakistan Army for creating conditions which led to the eventual loss of East Pakistan and for inept handling of military operations in the East.

== Military awards ==
=== Battle honours ===
After the war, 41 battle honours and 4 theatre honours were awarded to units of the Indian Army; notable among them are:

- East Pakistan 1971 (theatre honour)
- Sindh 1971 (theatre honour)
- Jammu and Kashmir 1971 (theatre honour)
- Punjab 1971 (theatre honour)
- Basantar River
- Bogra
- Chachro
- Chhamb
- Defence of Punch
- Dera Baba Nanak
- Gadra City
- Harar Kalan
- Hilli
- Longewala
- Parbat Ali
- Poongli Bridge
- Shehjra
- Shingo River Valley
- Sylhet

=== Gallantry awards ===
For bravery, a number of soldiers and officers on both sides were awarded the highest gallantry award of their respective countries. Following is a list of the recipients of the Indian award Param Vir Chakra, Bangladeshi award Bir Sreshtho and the Pakistani award Nishan-E-Haider:

==== India ====
Recipients of the Param Vir Chakra:

Rank	Name	Unit	References
Lance Naik	Albert Ekka (Posthumously)	14 Guards	
Flying Officer	Nirmal Jit Singh Sekhon (Posthumously)	No. 18 Squadron IAF	
Major	Hoshiar Singh	3 Grenadiers	
Second Lieutenant	Arun Khetarpal (Posthumously)	17th Horse (Poona Horse)	

==== Bangladesh ====
Recipients of the Bir Sreshtho:

- Captain Mohiuddin Jahangir (Posthumously)
- Lance Naik Munshi Abdur Rouf (Posthumously)
- Sepoy Hamidur Rahman (Posthumously)
- Sepoy Mostafa Kamal (Posthumously)
- ERA Mohammad Ruhul Amin (Posthumously)
- Flight Lieutenant Matiur Rahman (Posthumously)
- Lance Naik Nur Mohammad Sheikh (Posthumously)

==== Pakistan ====
Recipients of the Nishan-E-Haider:

Rank	Name	Unit	References
Major	Muhammad Akram (Posthumously)	4 Frontier Force Regiment	
Pilot Officer	Rashid Minhas (Posthumously)	No. 2 Squadron PAF	
Major	Shabbir Sharif (Posthumously)	6 Frontier Force Regiment	
Sowar	Muhammad Hussain (Posthumously)	20th Lancers	
Lance Naik	Muhammad Mahfuz (Posthumously)	15 Punjab	

== Civilian awards ==
On 25 July 2011, Bangladesh Swadhinata Sammanona (Bangladesh Freedom Honour) was posthumously conferred on former Indian Prime Minister Indira Gandhi.

R. M. Muzumdar, an Indian Ordnance Factories Service (IOFS), was awarded the Padma Bhushan by the Government of India, in 1973 for his contributions during the Indo-Pakistani war of 1971. O. P. Bahl, another IOFS officer received the Padma Shri, in 1972 for his efforts during the war.

On 28 March 2012, President of Bangladesh Zillur Rahman and the Prime Minister Sheikh Hasina conferred Bangladesh Liberation War Honour and Friends of Liberation War Honour to 75 people, six organisations, Mitra Bahini and the people of India at a special ceremony at the Bangabandhu International Conference Centre, Dhaka. This included eight heads of states: former Nepalese President Ram Baran Yadav, the third King of Bhutan Jigme Dorji Wangchuck, former Soviet general secretary Leonid IIyich Brezhnev, former Soviet head of state Nikolai Viktorovich Podgorny, former Soviet Prime Minister Alexei Nikolaevich Kosygin, former Yugoslav President Marshal Josip Broz Tito, former UK Prime Minister Sir Edward Richard George Heath and former Nepalese Prime Minister Bishweshwar Prasad Koirala. The organisations included the BBC, Akashbani (All India Radio), International Committee of the Red Cross, United Nations High Commissioner for Refugees, Oxfam and Kolkata University's Shahayak Samiti.

The list of foreign friends of Bangladesh has since been extended to 568 people. It includes 257 Indians, 88 Americans, 41 Pakistanis, 39 Britons, 9 Russians, 18 Nepalese, 16 French and 18 Japanese.

== In media ==
=== Films ===
- Ora Egaro Jon (The Magnificent Eleven), a 1972 Dhallywood war film directed by Chashi Nazrul Islam, featuring real Indian Army and Pakistani Army personnel. This was the first ever feature film about Bangladesh Liberation War.
- Hindustan Ki Kasam, a 1973 Bollywood war film directed by Chetan Anand about Operation Cactus Lilly.
- Aakraman, a 1975 Bollywood film set during this war featuring a romantic love triangle.
- Border, a 1997 Bollywood war film directed by J.P.Dutta. This movie is an adaptation from real life events that happened at the Battle of Longewala fought in Rajasthan (Western Theatre).
- 16 December, a 2002 film directed by Mani Shankar.
- 1971 – Prisoners of War, a 2007 Bollywood war film directed by Amrit Sagar. Set against the backdrop of a prisoner-of-war camp in Pakistan, it follows six Indian prisoners awaiting release after their capture during the war.
- Midnight's Children, a 2012 film was adapted from Salman Rushdie's novel, is fictional story of two twins born on the midnight of 15 August 1947. It also has references to 1971 war.
- Children of War, a 2014 Hindi drama film, revolves around the events of 1971 Bangladesh genocide and the liberation war.
- The Ghazi Attack, a 2017 war film directed by Sankalp Reddy. It is based on the sinking of PNS Ghazi during the war.
- 1971: Beyond Borders, a 2017 Indian war drama film written and directed by Major Ravi.
- Raazi, a 2017 fictional spy film, based on the novel "Calling Sehmat", was set before the events of war about the detection of plans to deploy PNS Ghazi
- Romeo Akbar Walter, a 2019 spy thriller film was set against the backdrop of the 1971 Indo-Pakistani war, which tells the story of Rehmatullah Ali, a young Indian bank clerk, who is recruited by the Research and Analysis Wing (RAW), for a covert operation in Pakistan.
- Bhuj: The Pride of India, 2021 action film set during the war tells the story of rebuilding the Bhuj airbase in India, which was damaged by the Pakistan air attacks.
- Pippa, a 2023 action film based on the life of Brigadier Balram Singh Mehta who fought in the Battle of Garibpur on the eastern front in November 1971.
- Sam Bahadur, a 2023 film, is based on the life of India's first Field Marshal Sam Manekshaw and his contribution to the 1971 Indo-Pak war.
- Border 2, an upcoming 2026 film, is based on multiple battles fought during the India-Pakistan war of 1971.

=== Short films ===
- Mukti: Birth of a Nation, a 2017 short film directed by Manu Chobe depictsalso focuses on hs contribution to 1971 war. the negotiations between Major General J. F. R. Jacob and Lieutenant General A. A. K. Niazi over the Pakistani Instrument of Surrender.

=== Miniseries/Dramas ===
- PNS Ghazi, an Urdu (Pakistani) drama based on sinking of PNS Ghazi, ISPR

== See also ==
- Bangladesh Liberation War
- Post–World War II air-to-air combat losses
- List of aerial victories during the Indo-Pakistani War of 1971
- Indo-Pakistani war of 1947–1948
- Indo-Pakistani War of 1965
- Indo-Pakistani air war of 1965
- Separatist nationalism in Pakistan
  - Muslim nationalism in South Asia
    - Pakistani nationalism
    - Conservatism in Pakistan
    - Socialism in Pakistan
- Bangladesh Forces
- Timeline of the Bangladesh War
- Radcliffe Line
- Pakistan and state-sponsored terrorism
- India and state-sponsored terrorism
- United States–Pakistan relations before 1990
- Soviet Union-Pakistan relations before 1990
- Tridev Roy
- Operation Searchlight\Barisal
- Riverine Warfare
- Protest of 1969 in Pakistan
- Pakistan Air Force in East Pakistan
- International Crimes Tribunal (Bangladesh)
- Indian Army in East Pakistan
- Pakistan-Afghanistan relations
- 1971 Winter POWs/MIA Investigations, Pakistan
- Pakistan military deployments in other countries
- Pakistan and weapons of mass destruction

=== General ===
- History of Bangladesh
- History of Myanmar
- List of conflicts in Asia
