= Rancho Ex-Mission Soledad =

Mexican land grant in California

- Mexican land grant
- Interactive map of Rancho Ex-Mission Soledad
- Coordinates: 36.410°N 121.380°W
- Country: United States
- State: California
- County: Monterey
- Granted: 1845
- Founder: Feliciano Soberanes

Area
  - Total: 14 sq mi (36 km^{2})

Rancho Ex-Mission Soledad was a 8,900-acre (36 km^{2}) Mexican land grant in the Salinas Valley, in present-day Monterey County, California. It was given in 1845 by Governor Pío Pico to Feliciano Soberanes.

The grant derives its name from the secularized Mission Nuestra Señora de la Soledad, but was called ex-Mission because of a division made of the lands held in the name of the Mission — the church retaining the grounds immediately around, and all of the lands outside of this are called ex-Mission lands. The grant was adjacent Mission Soledad, west of the Salinas River and Soledad.

== History ==
The Soberanes family patriarch, José Maria Soberanes (1753–1803) accompanied the Portola expedition to San Francisco Bay in 1769. Soberanes married Maria Josefa Castro (1759–1822) and received Rancho Buena Vista. Soberanes sons, Feliciano Soberanes (1788–1868) and Mariano Soberanes (1794–1859), were granted Rancho El Alisal in 1833.

Feliciano Soberanes (1788–1868) was born in Monterey where he spent his whole life. He was regidor in 1829 and 1830, and then alcade at Monterey in 1838–1839. He married Maria Antonia Rodriguez (1795–1883) in 1810. Feliciano Soberanes was granted Rancho San Lorenzo in 1841. Feliciano's daughter, Maria Josefa Soberanes, was granted Rancho Los Coches in 1841. Feliciano's son, Francisco Maria Soberanes (1818–1887), was granted Rancho Sanjon de Santa Rita in 1841. Feliciano became administrator of Mission Soledad lands and received the two square league Rancho Ex-Mission Soledad in 1845.

With the cession of California to the United States following the Mexican-American War, the 1848 Treaty of Guadalupe Hidalgo provided that the land grants would be honored. As required by the Land Act of 1851, a claim for Rancho Ex-Mission Soledad was filed with the Public Land Commission in 1853, and the grant was patented to Feliciano Soberanes in 1874.

When Feliciano died in 1868, his son, Francisco Soberanes, acquired Rancho Ex-Mission Soledad, and later purchased the adjoining Rancho Paraje de Sanchez. Francisco Soberanes married Ysabel Boronda, daughter of José Manuel Boronda, grantee of Rancho Los Laureles. When Francisco Soberanes died in 1887, he left half of his estate to his widow, Ysabel Boronda Soberanes and the other half to his six surviving children. Shortly after the distribution of the estate under the will, the widow, Ysabel Bornoda Soberanes, transferred her entire share of the property to one son, Abel Soberanes, to the exclusion of the other five heirs. In 1891, Benito Soberanes, one of the other sons, petitioned to have the mother declared incompetent.

Francisco Soberanes's son Benito Soberanes lost his share of the rancho to banks, who sold it to Charles Romie. Romie sold the property to The Salvation Army, who created Fort Romie, California.

== See also ==
- Mission Nuestra Señora de la Soledad
- Ranchos of Monterey County, California
- List of Ranchos of California
