= Rancho El Alisal =

Mexican land grant in present-day Monterey County, California

Coordinates: 36.670°N 121.570°W

Rancho El Alisal was a 8,912-acre (36.07 km^{2}) Mexican land grant in present-day Monterey County, California, given in 1833 by Governor José Figueroa to the brothers Feliciano and Mariano Soberanes and to William Edward Petty Hartnell. Alisal means Alder tree (sycamore) in Spanish. The land is approximately four miles (six kilometers) southeast of present-day Salinas.

== History ==
The Soberanes family patriarch, José Maria Soberanes (1753-1803), accompanied the Portola expedition to the San Francisco Bay in 1769. Soberanes married Maria Josefa Castro (1759-1822) and received Rancho Buena Vista. Soberanes's sons, Feliciano Soberanes and Mariano Soberanes, received several land grants in Monterey County.

Feliciano Soberanes (1788-1868) was born in Monterey where he spent his whole life. He was regidor in 1829-1830, and then alcade at Monterey in 1838-1839. He married Maria Antonia Rodriguez (1795-1883) in 1810. Feliciano was the grantee of Rancho San Lorenzo in 1841. Soberanes became the administrator of Mission Soledad lands and received the Rancho Ex-Mission Soledad grant in 1845. Maria Josefa Soberanes, daughter of Feliciano, was granted Rancho Los Coches in 1841. Francisco Maria Soberanes (1818-1887), son of Feliciano, was granted Rancho Sanjon de Santa Rita in 1841.

Mariano de Jesus Soberanes (1794-1859) was a soldier and also held the office of alcade in Monterey. Mariano Soberanes married María Isidora Vallejo (1791-1830), sister of General Mariano Guadalupe Vallejo. Their daughter, Maria Ygnacia Soberanes, married Dr. Edward Turner Bale, grantee of Rancho Carne Humana. Mariano de Jesus Soberanes was granted Rancho San Bernardo and Rancho Los Ojitos in 1842.

In 1833, the brothers Feliciano and Mariano Soberanes went into a partnership with Hartnell.

== Rancho El Alisal (Bernal) ==
The Soberanes portion of Rancho El Alisal was purchased by the Bernal family. In 1855, Bruno Bernal (1799-1863), son of Jose Joaquin Bernal, grantee of Rancho Santa Teresa, moved to his Rancho El Alisal.

With the cession of California to the United States following the Mexican-American War, the 1848 Treaty of Guadalupe Hidalgo provided that the land grants would be honored. As required by the Land Act of 1851, a claim for one square league was filed with the Public Land Commission in 1853, and the grant was patented at 5,941 acres (24.0 km^{2}) to Bruno Bernal in 1866.

Parts of the ranch were later purchased by James A. Bardin, a local lawyer and judge. Some of the land has remained in the Bardin family. The homestead of the Soberanes was acquired by the Silacci family.

== Rancho El Alisal (Hartnell) ==
Hartnell (1798–1854) named his new property El Patrocinio de San Jose (the patronage of Saint Joseph). Hartnell sold Rancho El Alisal to his former pupil Juan Alvarado in 1841.

A claim was filed for two-thirds of a square league with the Public Land Commission in 1852, and the grant was patented at 2,971 acres (12.0 km^{2}) to Hartnell's wife, Maria Teresa de la Guerra, in 1882. The property was later owned by Hartnell's daughter Ana and her husband Pedro Zabala. It was split among their children. Their granddaughter Anita Zabala married first Lindsay C. Howard, then George Washington Vanderbilt III.

The homestead of the Hartnells was later owned by the Bardin family.

== See also ==
- List of Ranchos of California
