= USNS Mission Soledad =

History

United States
- Laid down: 12 July 1943
- Launched: 28 September 1943
- Acquired: 16 October 1947
- In service: 16 October 1947
- Out of service: 31 October 1957
- Stricken: 31 October 1957
- Identification: IMO number: 6704464
- Fate: Sold, 4 November 1966

General characteristics
- Displacement: 21,880 tons full; 5,532 tons light
- Length: 524 ft (160 m)
- Beam: 68 ft (21 m)
- Draft: 30 ft (9 m)
- Propulsion: Turbo-electric, single screw, 6,000 hp (4.5 MW)
- Speed: 16.5 knots (31 km/h)
- Complement: 52 mariners

SS Mission Soledad was a Type T2-SE-A2 tanker built for the United States Maritime Commission during World War II. After the war she was acquired by the United States Navy as USS Mission Soledad (AO-136). Later the tanker transferred to the Military Sea Transportation Service as USNS Mission Soledad (T-AO-136). She was a member of the Mission Buenaventura-class oiler and was named for Mission Nuestra Señora de la Soledad, located in Soledad, California.

== Career ==
Mission Soledad was laid down 12 July 1943 under a Maritime Commission contract by Marine Ship Corporation, Sausalito, California; launched 28 September 1943; sponsored by Mrs. Atholl McBean; delivered 16 January 1944. Chartered to Pacific Tankers, Inc. for operations, she spent the remainder of the War carrying fuel to Allied forces in the western Pacific. She remained in this capacity until mid-February 1946, when she returned to her building yard and was laid up in reserve.

Acquired by the Navy 16 October 1947 she was chartered to Pacific Tankers, Inc. for operation and placed under the operational control of the Naval Transportation Service as Mission Soledad (AO-136). When operational control of this tanker was assumed by the newly created Military Sea Transportation Service on 1 October 1949, she was redesignated USNS Mission Soledad (T-AO-136). In October 1957, while on one of her voyages to the Middle East, she received an SOS from USS Merrimack after the oiler had lost all propulsion power. Mission Soledad rushed to the scene and rendered assistance until USS Pecos arrived and began towing the stricken ship into Bombay, India. Upon her arrival in the United States, she was returned to the Maritime Administration (MARAD) on 31 October 1957, struck from the Naval Vessel Register on the same date, and laid up in the Maritime Reserve Fleet.

The ship was sold to the Hudson Waterways Corporation on 4 November 1966 and renamed Seatrain California on 7 November. She was transferred to Transwestern Associates, Inc., and renamed Transontario, IMO 6704464, on 27 February 1967. In 1969 she was converted to a container ship at Newport News Shipbuilding and Drydock. Upon completion of the conversion she was sold to Greyhound Leasing and began hauling containerized cargo for Seatrain Lines between U.S. west coast ports and Hawaii, Guam and other U.S. Pacific territories. In 1974 Transontario was leased to Matson, Inc. when Seatrain sold its Hawaiian operations to the Hawaiian-based shipping company. The ship was sold to be scrapped in 1979.

During her active military service she was awarded the National Defense Service Medal, the Korean Service Medal (five times), the United Nations Service Medal and the Republic of Korea War Service Medal (retroactively). She also received five battle stars for her Korean War service.
