= Rancho San Lorenzo (Soberanes) =

Mexican land grant in California

Coordinates: 36.230°N 121.140°W

Rancho San Lorenzo was a 21,884-acre (88.56 km^{2}) Mexican land grant in the southern Salinas Valley, in present-day Monterey County, California, USA. It was given in 1841 by Governor Juan Alvarado to Feliciano Soberanes.

The grant extended along the east bank of the Salinas River, bounded on the south by San Lorenzo Creek, and encompassed present-day King City, California.

== History ==
The Soberanes family patriarch, José Maria Soberanes (1753–1803) accompanied the Portola expedition to San Francisco Bay in 1769. Soberanes married Maria Josefa Castro (1759–1822) and received Rancho Buena Vista. Soberanes' sons, Feliciano Soberanes and Mariano Soberanes (1794–1859), were granted Rancho El Alisal in 1833.

Feliciano Soberanes (1788–1868) was born in Monterey where he spent his whole life. He married Maria Antonia Rodriguez (1795–1883) in 1810. He was regidor in 1829 and 1830, and then alcade at Monterey in 1838–39. Feliciano became administrator of Mission Soledad lands and received Rancho Ex-Mission Soledad in 1845. Feliciano's daughter, Maria Josefa Soberanes, was granted Rancho Los Coches in 1841. Feliciano's son, Francisco Maria Soberanes (1818–1887), was granted Rancho Sanjon de Santa Rita in 1841.

Feliciano Soberanes was granted the five square league Rancho San Lorenzo in 1841. The sons of Feliciano, with Panfilo Soberanes in charge, worked Rancho San Lorenzo for many years.

With the cession of California to the United States following the Mexican-American War, the 1848 Treaty of Guadalupe Hidalgo provided that the land grants would be honored. As required by the Land Act of 1851, a claim for Rancho San Lorenzo was filed with the Public Land Commission in 1852, and the grant was patented to Feliciano Soberanes in 1866.

In 1856, Eugene Sherwood, an Etonian and former British Army captain, came to San Francisco and bought Rancho San Lorenzo. Sherwood began moving his attention to Rancho Sausal which he had purchased from Jacob P. Leese in 1860. About 1865, Carlisle S. Abbott, born in Quebec, Canada, purchased about 12,000 acres (49 km^{2}) of Rancho San Lorenzo. In the mid-1870s, Abbott joined with David Jacks to build the narrow gauge Monterey & Salinas Valley Railroad. When the railroad went bankrupt, Abbott lost everything. In 1884, Charles H. King, founder of King City, bought 13,000 acres (53 km^{2}) of Rancho San Lorenzo from the estate of Solomon Bailey Boswell.

== See also ==
- Ranchos of California
- List of Ranchos of California
