= San Vicente Elementary School =

San Vicente Elementary School may refer to:

- San Vicente Elementary School - Soledad, California - Soledad Unified School District
- San Vicente Elementary School - Brewster County, Texas - San Vicente Independent School District
- San Vicente Elementary School - San Vicente, Saipan, Commonwealth of the Northern Mariana Islands - Commonwealth of the Northern Mariana Islands Public School System

== See also ==
- San Vicente Catholic School - Barrigada, Guam - Roman Catholic Diocese of Agana
