= Rancho Los Coches (Soberanes) =

Mexican land grant in California

- U.S. National Register of Historic Places
- Location within California Location within the United States
- Location: Monterey, California
- Coordinates: 36°24′14″N 121°19′04″W
- Built: 1841
- NRHP reference No.: 79000502
- Added to NRHP: January 31, 1979

Rancho Los Coches was a 8,794-acre (35.59 km^{2}) Mexican land grant in present-day Monterey County, California given in 1841 by Governor Juan Alvarado to María Josefa Soberanes. The name means "the pigs". The grant was south of Soledad and extended along the Arroyo Seco.

== History ==
The Soberanes family patriarch, José Maria Soberanes (1753-1803) accompanied the Portola expedition to San Francisco Bay in 1769. Soberanes married Maria Josefa Castro (1759-1822) and received Rancho Buena Vista. His sons Feliciano Soberanes (1788-1868) and Mariano Soberanes (1794-1859) were granted Rancho El Alisal in 1833. Feliciano Soberanes married Maria Antonia Rodriguez (1795-1883) in 1810. He was the grantee of Rancho San Lorenzo in 1841 and Rancho Ex-Mission Soledad in 1845. Feliciano's son Francisco Maria Soberanes (1818-1887), was granted Rancho Sanjon de Santa Rita in 1841.

Feliciano's daughter, Maria Josefa Soberanes, was granted the two square league Rancho Los Coches in 1841. In 1839 Maria Josefa Soberanes married William Brunner Richardson, a tailor who had come from Baltimore, Maryland, seven years before. Rancho Los Coches became known as the Richardson Rancho.

With the cession of California to the United States following the Mexican-American War, the 1848 Treaty of Guadalupe Hidalgo provided that the land grants would be honored. As required by the Land Act of 1851, a claim for Rancho Los Coches was filed with the Public Land Commission in 1853, and the grant was patented to María Josefa Soberanes in 1883. 1847, during the Mexican–American War, Captain John C. Frémont camped on the Richardson ranch property. This was a major loss for the Richardsons and was the probable reason for the ultimate demise of the Rancho. From 1848 to 1854, the rancho was a stop on the San Juan Bautista-Soledad stage line, and from 1854 to 1868 the Butterfield Overland Stage running between San Francisco and Los Angeles. Like most of the other California Ranchos, Los Coches was already in trouble when the drought of 1860 hit. The property was acquired by David Jacks in a sheriff's sale in 1865.

== California Historical Landmark at the Rancho ==
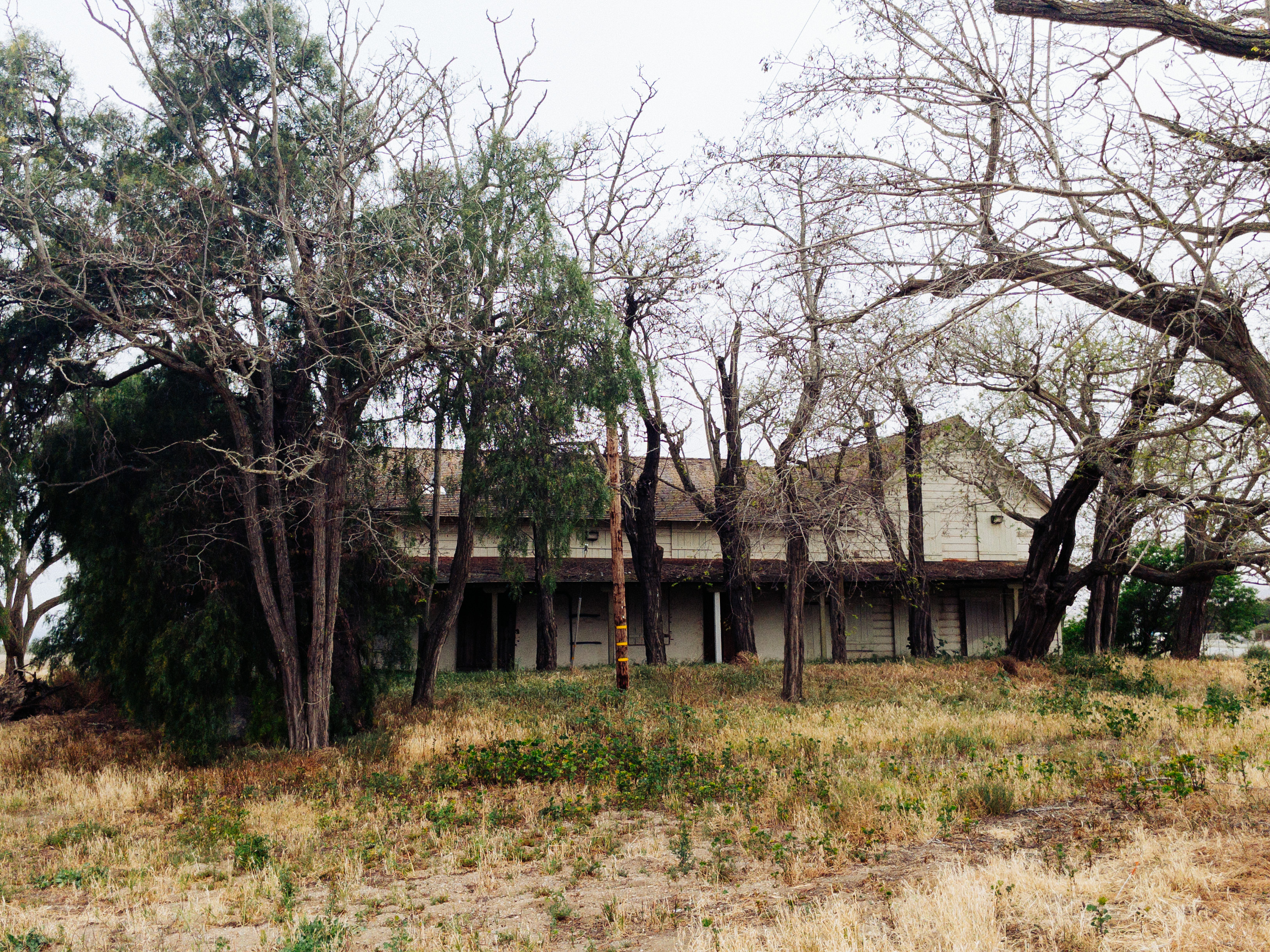
Richardson Adobe

Richardson Adobe was built by William Brunner Richardson in 1843 with wooden additions made in 1848. The house is a California Historical Landmark number 494.

California Historical Landmark reads:

NO. 494 RICHARDSON ADOBE - Los Coches Rancho (8,994.2 acres) was granted to María Josefa Soberanes de Richardson by the Mexican government in 1841. Her husband, William Brunner Richardson, a native of Baltimore, Maryland, built the adobe house here in 1843, and planted the nearby locust trees in 1846. This was the site of Captain John C. Frémont's encampment in 1846 and 1847, the adobe was later used as a stage station and post office. It was donated to the State of California in 1958 by Margaret Jacks.

== See also ==
- Ranchos of California
- List of Ranchos of California
