= USS Pecos (AO-65) =

Oiler of the United States Navy

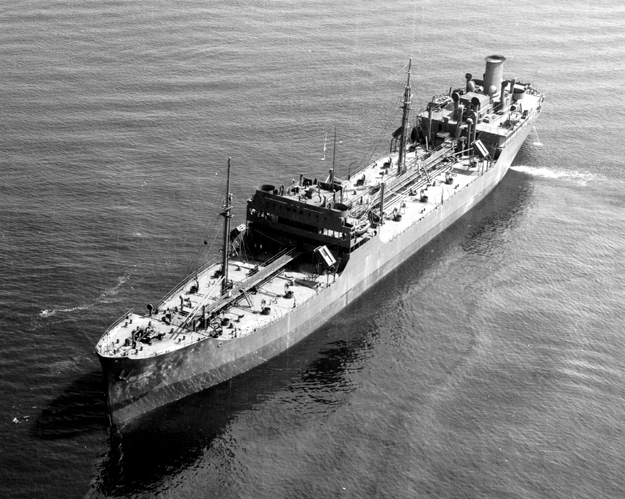
- USS Pecos

History

United States
- Name: USS Pecos
- Namesake: Pecos River in New Mexico and Texas
- Laid down: 20 April 1942
- Launched: 17 August 1942
- Acquired: 29 August 1942
- Commissioned: 5 October 1942
- Decommissioned: 14 March 1946
- In service: 18 July 1950
- Stricken: 23 April 1947
- Reinstated: 20 March 1950
- Fate: Scrapped July 1975

General characteristics
- Type: Suamico-class fleet replenishment oiler
- Displacement: 5,782 long tons (5,875 t) light; 21,880 long tons (22,231 t) full
- Length: 523 ft 6 in (159.56 m)
- Beam: 68 ft (21 m)
- Draft: 30 ft (9.1 m)
- Propulsion: Turbo-electric, single screw, 8,000 hp (5,966 kW)
- Speed: 15.5 knots (28.7 km/h; 17.8 mph)
- Capacity: 140,000 barrels (22,000 m^{3})
- Complement: 251
- Armament: 1 × 5"/38 caliber guns; 4 × 3"/50 caliber guns; 4 × twin 40 mm AA guns; 4 × twin 20 mm AA guns

USS Pecos (AO–65) was laid down 20 April 1942 by the Sun Shipbuilding and Dry Dock Co. as a type T3-SE-A1 tanker, Chester, Pennsylvania, as Corsicana (MC hull 325); launched 17 August acquired by the Navy 29 August 1942; and commissioned 5 October 1942.

== Bora Bora ==
After operations along the Atlantic coast, the oiler transited the Panama Canal and sailed 18 February 1943 for Fanui Bay, Bora Bora, mothering a brood of 11 subchasers, five yard minesweepers, numerous LCI(L)'s, and one net tender. Four motor torpedo boats nested in cradles in the forward and after well decks. Pecos fueled each small craft every four days. Throughout the voyage, groups of boats came alongside the tanker for fuel; then, replenished, gave place to others. Pecos next supported the landings at Tarawa, Gilbert Islands, refueling the bombardment and transport groups. She returned to the West Coast late in 1943 and departed San Pedro, Calif., on New Year's Eve after undergoing repairs and loading with oil and supplies.

== Escort ==
Pecos departed Majuro Atoll 2 February 1944 to escort Washington into the anchorage after the latter's bow had been shorn off in collision with Indiana. For over three hours the officers and men of Pecos worked at the delicate task of getting the huge battleship alongside, then maneuvering her into the atoll. She performed the whole operation in the dark, and acted as anchor for Washington overnight. Less than two weeks after Kwajalein Atoll fell to the Americans, the tanker steamed into the lagoon and refueled warships in the Marshall Islands until returning to Pearl Harbor early in March for oil and supplies. She then headed for the southwest Pacific to support strikes against the Palaus in late March and early April.

== The Pacific ==
For ten hours on 10 July, shells from marine "Long-Tom" cannons flew over Pecos as she lay at anchor off Saipan, refueling cruisers, destroyers, and an LST full of high explosives. The oiler next began fueling operations running between Eniwetok in the Marshalls and Manus in the Admiralty Islands. In September, she participated in the Palau invasion, fueling the bombardment and transport groups.

On 2 January 1945, Japanese aircraft attacked the tanker as she steamed from Leyte Gulf toward Mindoro. The following day seven general quarters alarms announced Japanese planes. A bomb exploded so close astern that the oil feed pump fuses blew temporarily stopping the main engine. On the evening of 4 January, three enemy planes attacked the anchorage in Mangarin Bay, Mindoro. One bomb, a dud, skipped from the water and smashed into the after port cargo boom of Pecos, bending it almost double. A plane crashed into an ammunition ship lying less than a mile away, causing it to explode in a single, blinding flash. Pecos' guns splashed one attacker. Pecos shot down two more Japanese planes during a raid in the Sulu Sea off Negros Island.

A single engine Japanese plane dove out of the sun on the ship's starboard quarter 7 January 1945, releasing a bomb that struck the water 100 feet off her port bow before a tanker ahead of Pecos shot this plane down. During the next weeks, Pecos fueled the huge task force steaming up the South China Sea for the Lingayen landings. General Quarters became as routine an affair as fueling, as enemy planes continued to operate in the Mindoro area.

The veteran oiler next steamed to Mangarin Bay to supply aviation gasoline for an Army Air Force unit based there 18 February. Previously, fuel for the squadron's P–38 fighters had been flown in by transport aircraft, but the planes now were virtually grounded for lack of gasoline. At the month's end, Pecos departed the Philippine area for Ulithi Atoll in the Western Caroline Islands to prepare for the war's final major landing operation at Okinawa, She spent April and May at sea in the fueling area off Okinawa transferring oil and gasoline to 3rd Fleet ships.

Pecos spent two hectic days outside of Hagushi Anchorage, adjoining the war-torn city of Naha, fueling destroyers on the perilous picket lines. On the evening of 20 May, in a major Japanese air raid, kamikaze pilots hit five of the picket ships. but the tanker was untouched. Pecos sailed for the United States on 28 May, after seventeen consecutive months overseas. With overhaul completed, Pecos departed San Francisco 14 August 1945—as word was received of the end of hostilities. By 26 September she was anchored in Sasebo Ko, Kyushu Island, Japan, which had just been occupied by American naval forces, fueling the vessels in the harbor.

== Decommissioned ==
Pecos decommissioned 14 March 1946. She was transferred to the Maritime Commission 1 April 1947 and struck from the Navy List 23 April 1947. By directive dated January 1948, Pecos was reacquired by the Navy. She was reinstated on the Navy List 20 March 1950. She was then taken over by the Military Sea Transportation Service 18 July 1950 to be operated by a merchant crew. USNS Pecos was operated by Mathiasen's Tanker Industry Inc under contract to the U.S. Government until 1975. Commodore Larry Wade was CO from 13 March 1972, until 19 October 1972, during which time she traded in the Caribbean and made trips to the Arctic assigned to the 1st Naval District. In October 1957, while on a voyage to the Middle East, she received an SOS from the USS Merrimack (AO-37) after the oiler had lost all propulsion power. The USNS Mission Soledad (T-AO-136) rendered assistance until Pecos arrived and towed the stricken ship into Bombay, India.

She was scrapped in July 1975.

Pecos received seven Battle Stars for World War II service.
