= Rancho Sanjon de Santa Rita =

Mexican land grant in California

Coordinates: 37.130°N 120.680°W

Rancho Sanjon de Santa Rita was a 48,824-acre (197.58 km^{2}) Mexican land grant mostly in present-day Merced County, California and also a small part in Fresno County, California given in 1841 by Governor Juan Alvarado to Francisco Maria Soberanes. Sanjon is an alternate spelling of zanja, Spanish for ditch or deep slough. The grant was west of the San Joaquin River and encompassed present-day Santa Rita Park and Dos Palos Y.

== History ==
The Soberanes family patriarch, José Maria Soberanes (1753-1803) accompanied the Portola expedition to San Francisco Bay in 1769. Soberanes married Maria Josefa Castro (1759-1822) and received Rancho Buena Vista. His sons, Feliciano Soberanes (1788-1868) and Mariano Soberanes (1794-1859), were granted Rancho El Alisal in 1833. Feliciano Soberanes married Maria Antonia Rodriguez (1795-1883) in 1810. He was also the grantee of Rancho San Lorenzo in 1841 and Rancho Ex-Mission Soledad in 1845.

Feliciano's daughter, Maria Josefa Soberanes, was granted Rancho Los Coches in 1841. Feliciano's son, Francisco Maria Soberanes (1818-1887), was granted the eleven square league Rancho Sanjon de Santa Rita in 1841. Francisco Soberanes married Ysabel Boronda, daughter of José Manuel Boronda, grantee of Rancho Los Laureles.

With the cession of California to the United States following the Mexican-American War, the 1848 Treaty of Guadalupe Hidalgo provided that the land grants would be honored. As required by the Land Act of 1851, a claim for Rancho Sanjon de Santa Rita was filed with the Public Land Commission in 1853, and the grant was patented to Francisco Soberanes in 1862.

Francisco Soberanes sold nine square leagues to Manuel Castro in 1853, who sold two square leagues to Salisbury Haly in 1858. In 1866 Henry Miller purchased the entire rancho. The Lux & Miller headquarters was located on the rancho, near present-day Santa Rita Park. The Nickel family, heirs of Henry Miller, continue to own some of the land from the ranch.
