= Soledad High School =

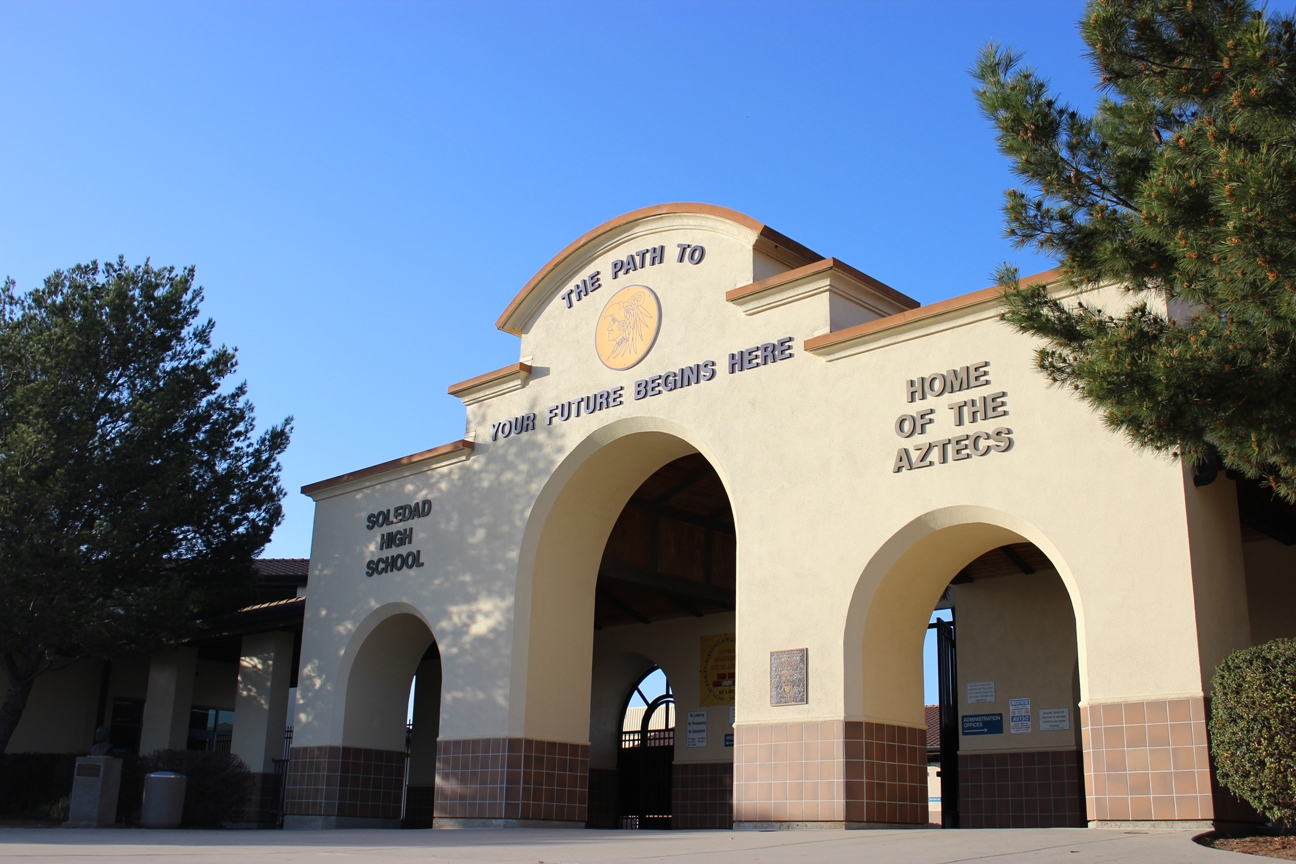
- Soledad High School's main entrance "Home of the Aztecs"

Location
- 425 Gabilan Drive; Soledad, California; United States; 36.4357°N 121.3257°W

Information
- Type: Public
- Motto: "A Commitment to Excellence"
- Established: 1999
- School district: Soledad Unified School District
- Principal: Phil Menchaca
- Teaching staff: 72.40 (FTE)
- Grades: 9 to 12
- Enrollment: 1,449 (2025–2026)
- Student to teacher ratio: 20.76
- Colors: Purple, Gold, Black
- Athletics conference: Pacific Coast Athletic League (PCAL)/Central Coast Section (CCS)
- Mascot: Aztec Warrior
- Yearbook: The Legend
- Feeder schools: Main Street Middle School, Mission Union Elementary School
- Website: shs.soledadusd.org

Soledad High School is a public secondary school located in Soledad, California, United States. A part of Soledad Unified School District, it was opened in 1999 and is the largest high school in south Monterey County, serving grades 9 through 12. In 2023, the school had approximately 1,534 students. The Monterey County Free Libraries Soledad Branch is located on the school's north-west part of campus, serving the high school as well as the public. Soledad High School's mascot is the Aztec Warrior.

== History ==
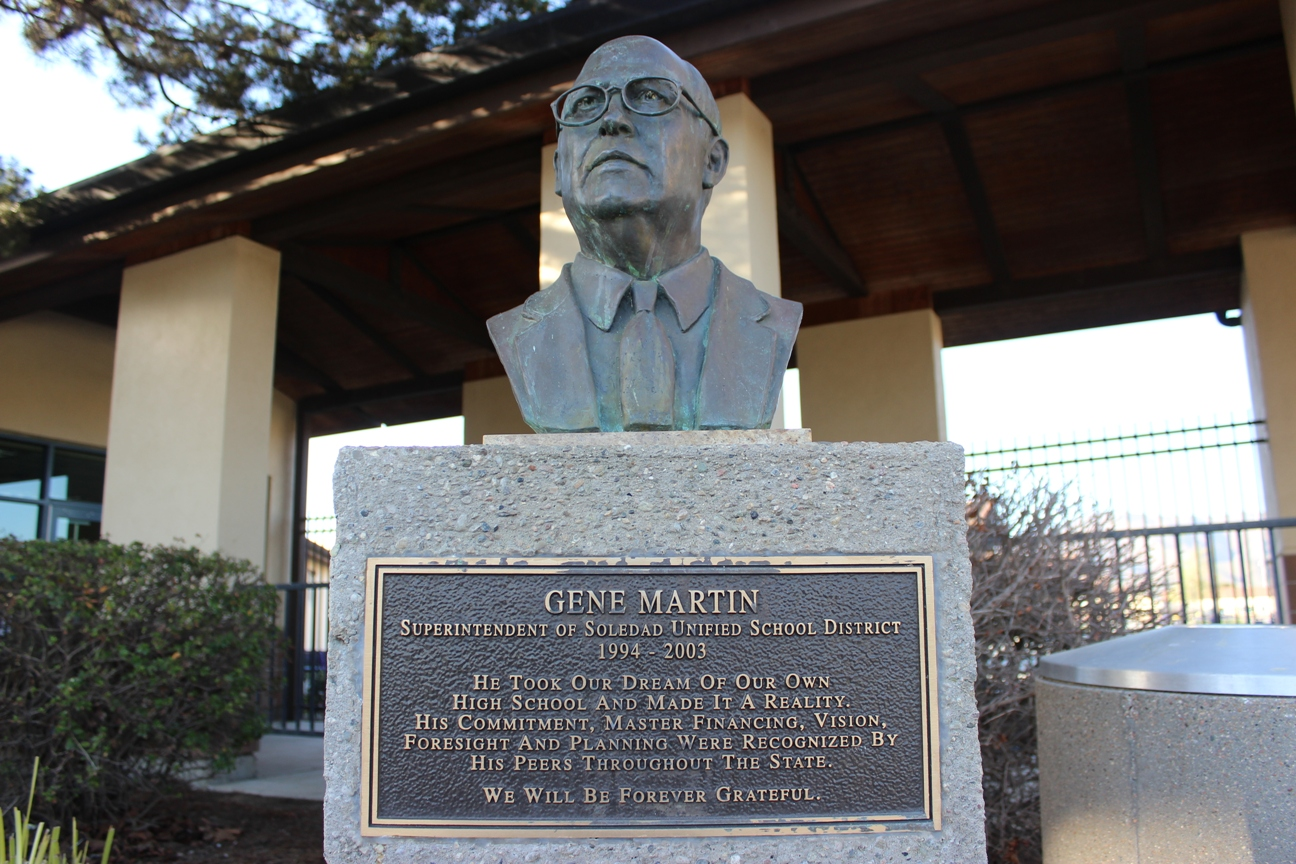
Gene Martin statue

The creation of Soledad High School was spearheaded by Gene Martin, SUSD Superintendent from 1994-2003.

== Demographics ==
As of the 2024-2025 school year, Soledad High School's student body is made up of primarily students of color, with a minority enrollment of around 98%. Of the school's ruffly 1,500 students, the vast majority identify as Hispanic, with smaller numbers identifying as Asian and White. Moreover, a large portion of the student body (15.4%) are considered English language Learners. Additionally, the district serves a large economically disadvantaged population, with 85.1% of all students being eligible for free/reduced school meals.

== Academics ==
Soledad High School provides a range of AP and Honors courses, as well as several comprehensive vocational and career focused opportunities in subjects ranging from Agriculture to Healthcare. The school also allows students to dual enroll at Hartnell College to gain additional high school and college credit.

Advanced Placement courses at Soledad High School include:

Science	Mathematics	Language	Social science	Visual arts
AP Environmental Science	AP Calculus AB	AP Spanish Language and Culture	AP World History	AP Art and Design
	AP Precalculus	AP Spanish Literature and Culture	AP United States Government and Politics	
	AP Statistics		AP United States History	
	AP Computer Science A			
	AP Computer Science Principles			

== Clubs ==
Future Farmers of America (FFA): The Soledad Future Farmers of America Chapter helps students learn about agriculture. The Soledad FFA organization had two students consecutively named to California State Officer Positions in 2007 and 2008.

MESA (Mathematics, Engineering, Science Achievement) is a club designed to help students who are interested in math and the different sciences offered at Soledad High School. The Soledad has attained a 44% annual rate of student members who attend a four-year university after high school. The program offers tutoring in the math and science departments, and provides its members with educational guidance for attaining a career in math, engineering or science.

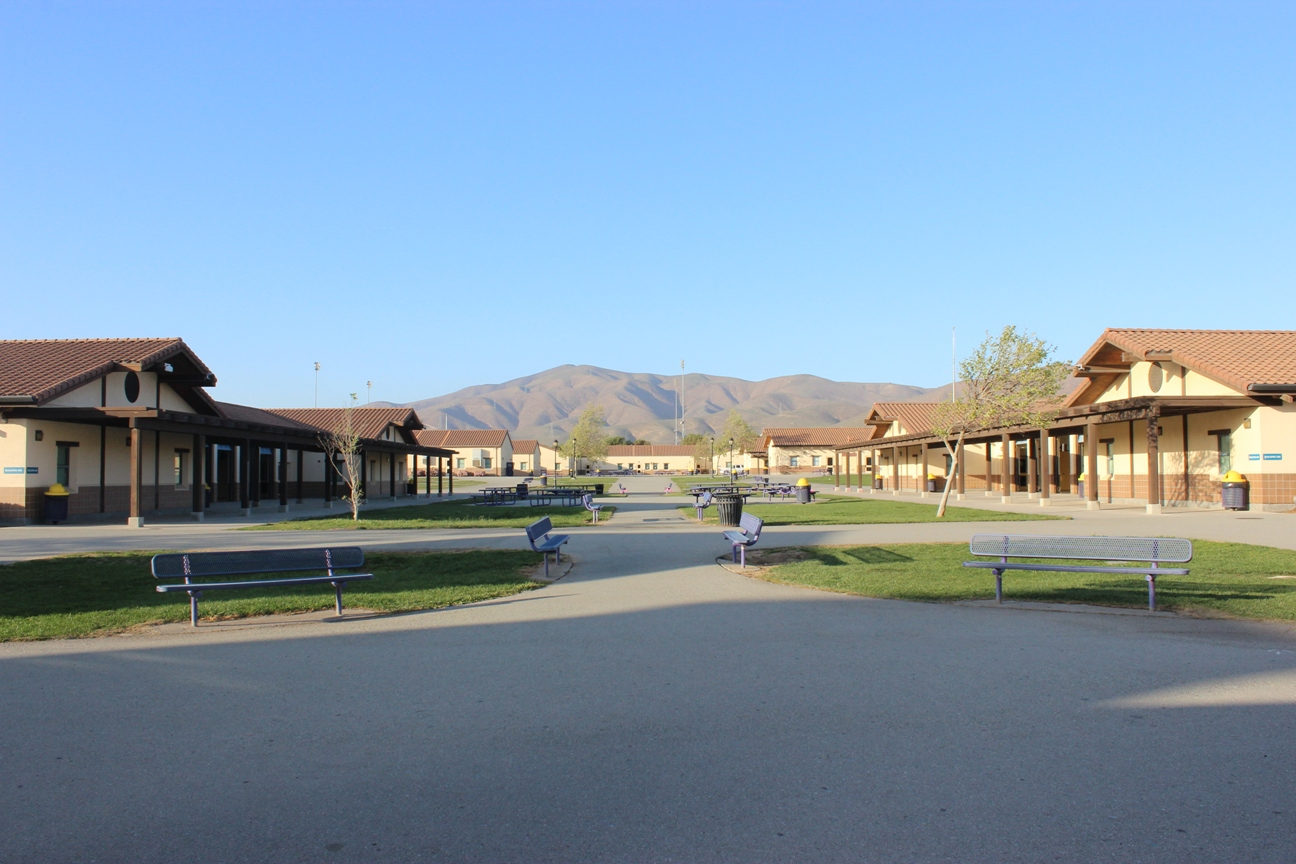
SHS classrooms

Navy Junior Reserve Officers Training Corps: The Navy Junior Reserve Officers' Training Corps (NJROTC) is a federal program sponsored by the United States Armed Forces in high schools and also in some middle schools across the United States and at US military bases across the world. In 2008, Soledad High School's NJROTC program ranked 16th nationally at the NJROTC National High School Tournament in Pensacola, Florida.

California Scholarship Federation: Soledad High School has had an active California Scholarship Federation Chapter since 2006. CSF Current Chapters

Anime Club: A club that mainly focuses on watching anime and manga, but also learning more of Japanese culture and how to draw in one's own style.

French Club: A club that promotes learning the French language.

Spanish Club: Also known as "Club Azteca", this promotes Spanish heritage and culture.

Yearbook Club: A class/club of 30-35 students that creates and publishes "The Legend", Soledad High School's yearbook.

Young Traveler's Club: This club allows students to explore the United States by having them sell boxes of candy to fund trips that cost over $1000.

== Athletics ==
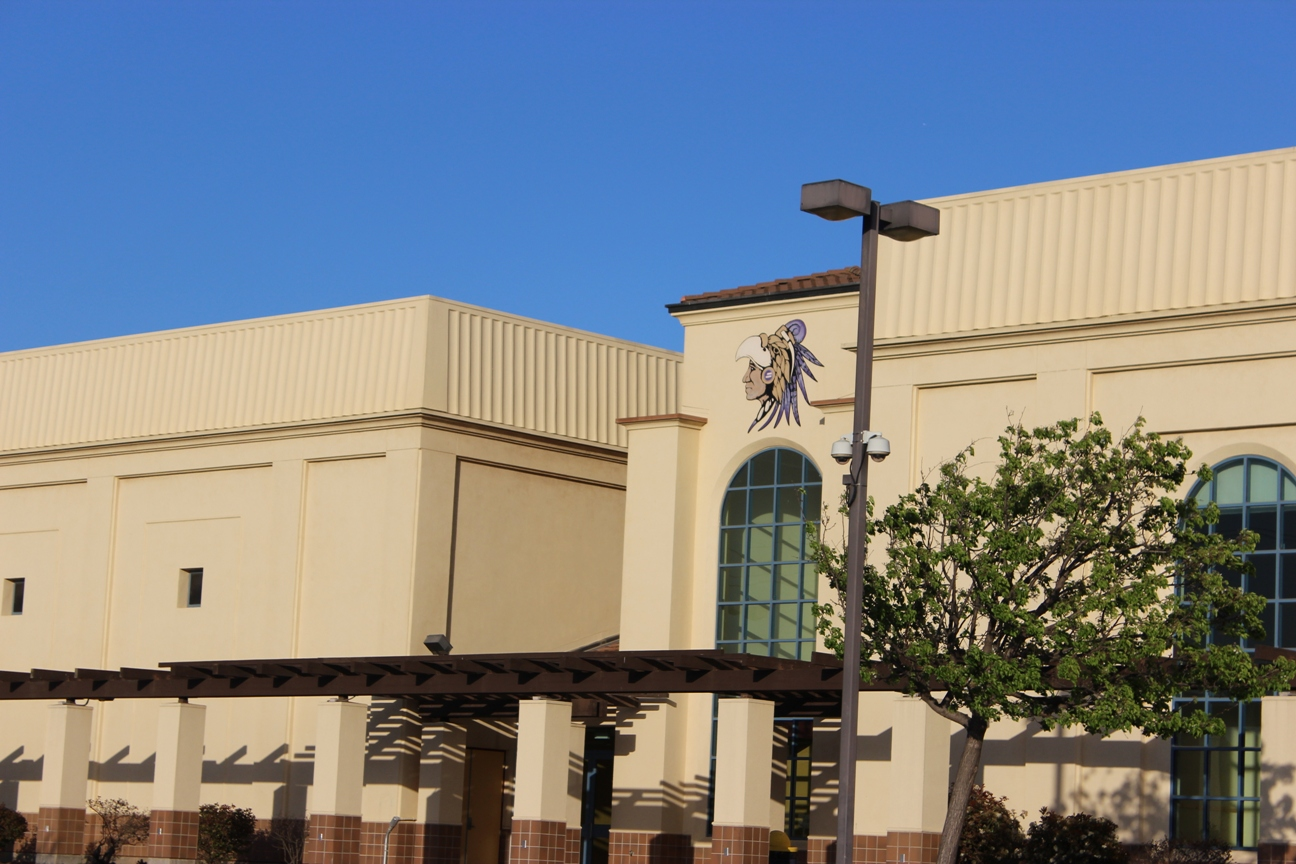
Soledad High School Field House

Soledad High School is a member of the Pacific Coast Athletic League (PCAL) and California's Central Coast Section (CCS).

Soledad's primary rivals are Carmel High School and Pacific Grove High School and Greenfield high school while still holding onto long time rivalry ties with Gonzales High School, the original high school of Soledad students before the opening of Soledad High School in 1999.

Soledad High School fields athletics teams in football, basketball, baseball, softball, soccer, swimming, cross-country, volleyball, wrestling, and track & field. In 2014, The Salinas Californian recognized Soledad baseball as the Monterey County's Most Winningest Baseball Program from 2009-2013, with 82 regular season victories. In 2016, the football team won the CIF Central Coast Section Division IV Title with a victory over Westmont High School at Independence High School (San Jose, CA). This would be the first section title of any athletics program in the high school's existence. Football, soccer, and track & field all hold home games/meets in Gene Martin Stadium. Volleyball, basketball, and wrestling hold home games/meets in Soledad High School Gym.

Soledad sports include:

Fall sports

- Girls' cross country
- Boys' cross country
- Football
  - League Titles - 2015, 2017,2022
  - CIF Section Titles -2016
- Girls' volleyball

Winter sports

- Boys' soccer
  - League Titles - 2000, 2005, 2007, 2011, 2012, 2013
- Girls' soccer
  - League Titles - 2015, 2016
- Boys' basketball
  - League Titles - 2005
- Girls' basketball
- Boys' wrestling
- Girls' wrestling

Spring sports

- Baseball
  - League Titles - 2009, 2014
- Softball
- Boys' track & field
- Girls' track & field
- Boys' swimming
- Girls' swimming
  - League Titles - 2019
