= Soledad, California =

City in California, United States

- City
- City of Soledad
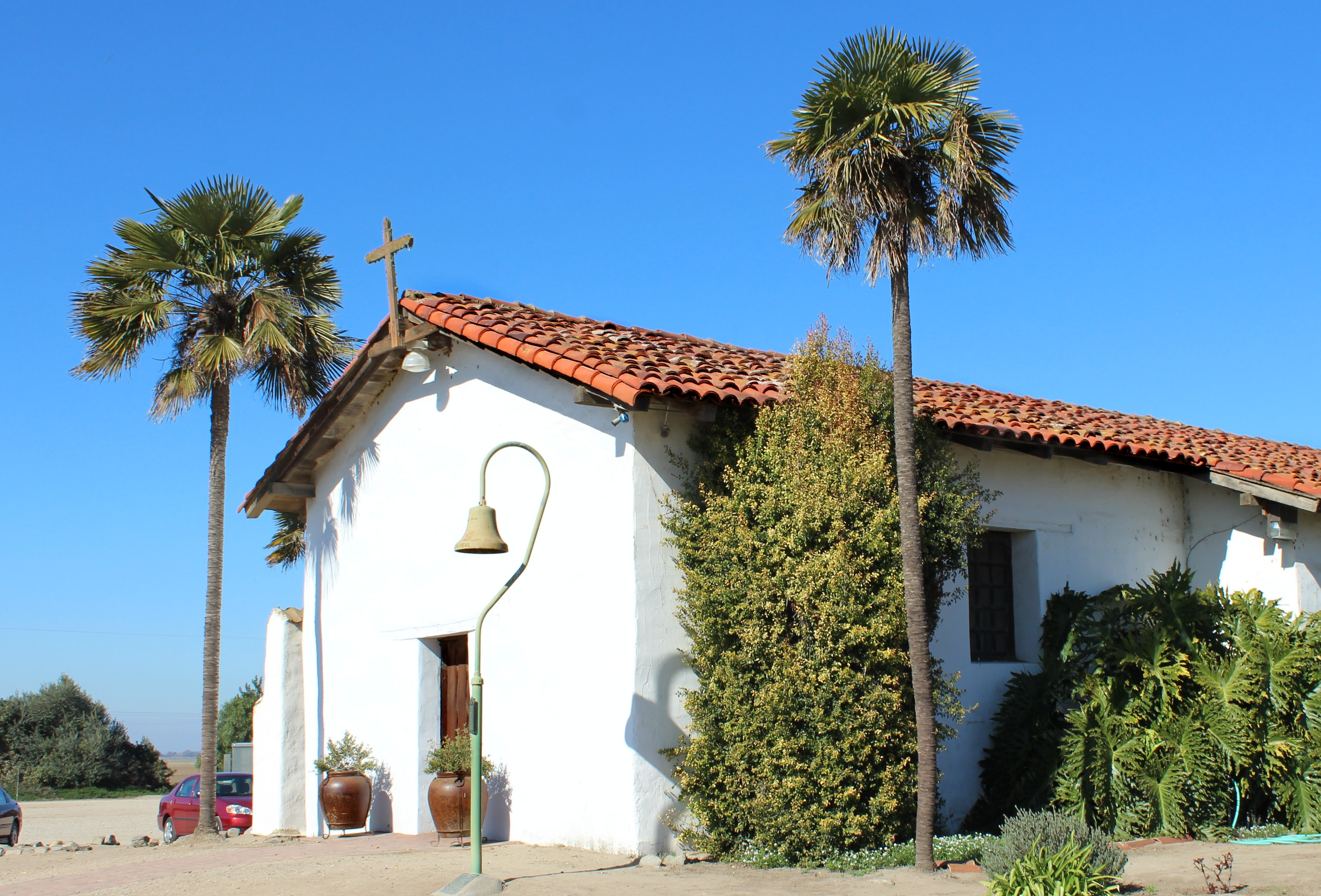
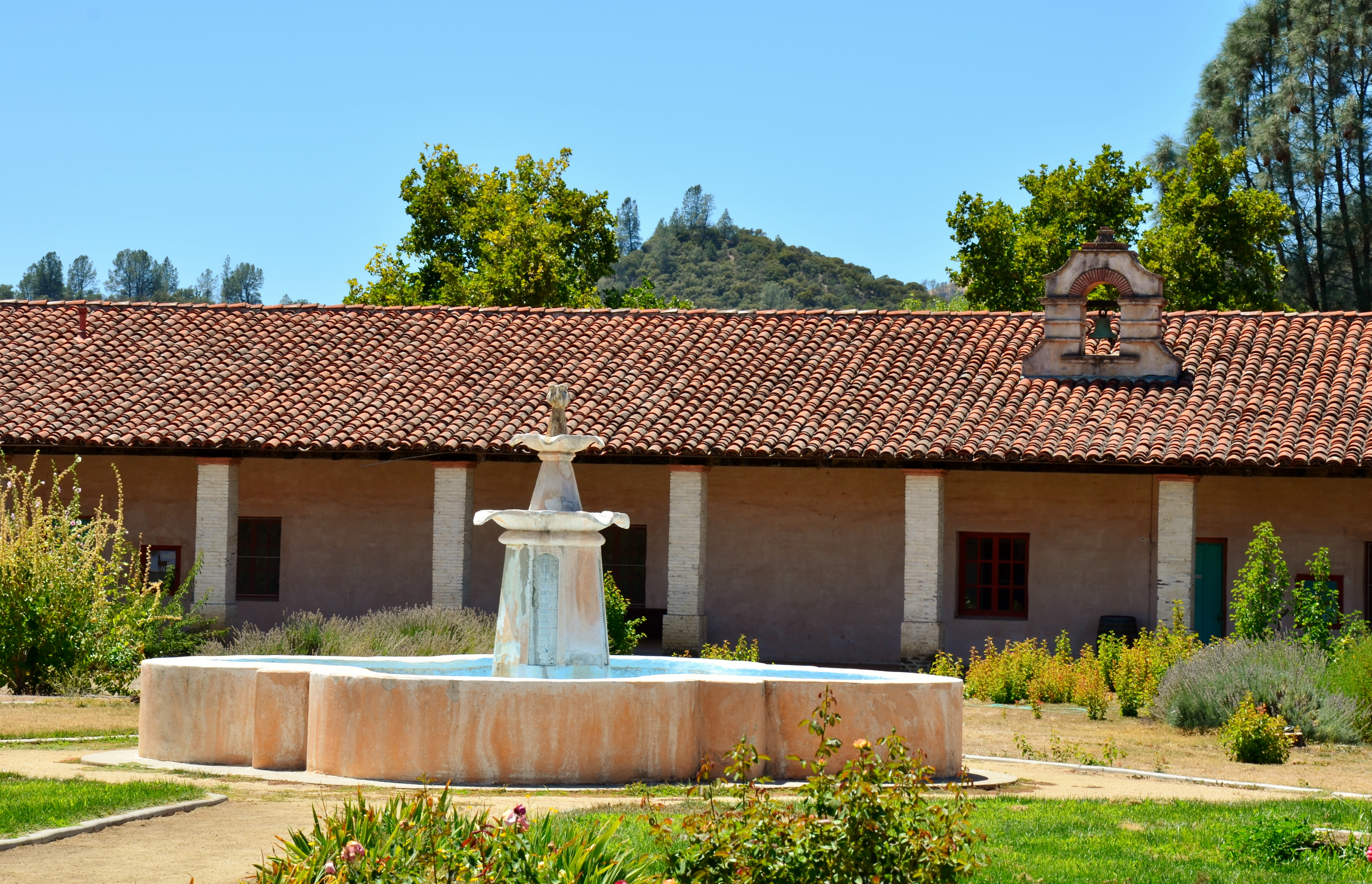
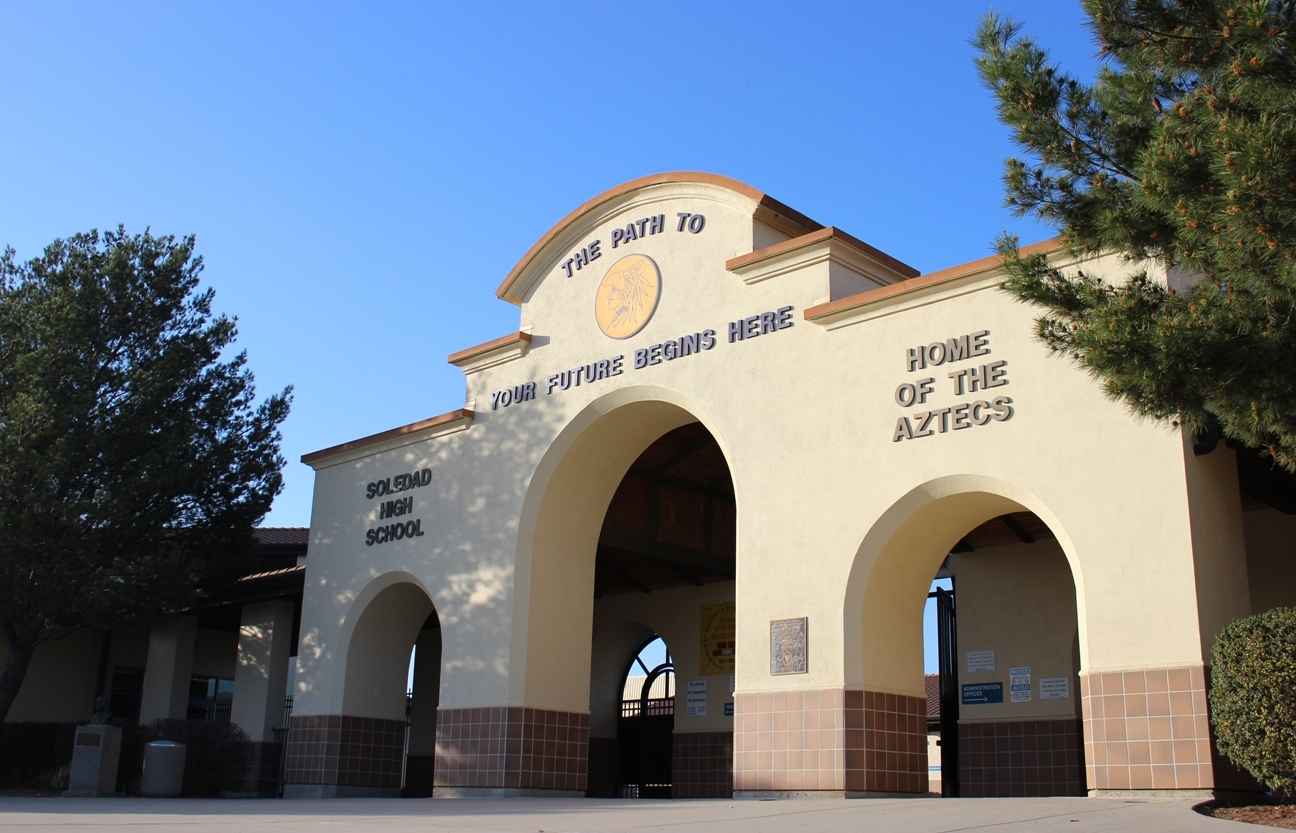
- Clockwise: Mission Nuestra Señora de la Soledad; Soledad High School; Mission Soledad.
- Interactive map of Soledad, California
- Location in the United States Soledad (California)
- Coordinates: 36°25′29″N 121°19′35″W
- Country: United States
- State: California
- County: Monterey
- Incorporated: March 9, 1921

Government
  - Mayor: Anna Velazquez
  - State senator: John Laird (D)
  - Assemblymember: Robert Rivas (D)
  - U. S. rep.: Zoe Lofgren (D)

Area
  - Total: 4.65 sq mi (12.0 km^{2})
  - Land: 4.46 sq mi (11.6 km^{2})
  - Water: 0.19 sq mi (0.49 km^{2}) 4.09%
- Elevation: 190 ft (58 m)

Population (2020)
  - Total: 24,925
  - Density: 5,588.6/sq mi (2,157.8/km^{2})
- Time zone: UTC-8 (Pacific)
  - Summer (DST): UTC-7 (PDT)
- ZIP code: 93960
- Area code: 831
- FIPS code: 06-72520
- Website: www.cityofsoledad.gov

Soledad (Spanish for "Solitude") is a city in Monterey County, California, United States. It is in the Salinas Valley, 21 miles (34 km) southeast of Salinas, the county seat. Soledad's population was 24,925 at the 2020 census, down from 25,738 in 2010. Soledad's origins started with Mission Nuestra Señora de la Soledad, founded by the Spanish in 1791, under the leadership of Fermín de Lasuén. Catalina Munrás began developing the town of Soledad on her Rancho San Vicente in the 1860s, which eventually incorporated as a city in 1921. Today, Soledad is a notable tourist destination, owing to the heavily restored mission, its proximity to Pinnacles National Park, and its numerous vineyards, as part of the Monterey wine region.

== History ==
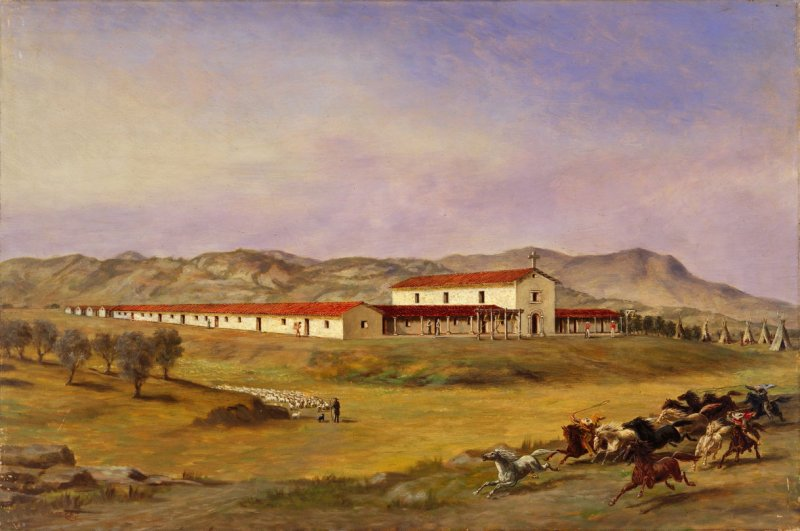
The Spanish founded Mission Nuestra Señora de la Soledad in 1791, under the direction of Fermín Lasuén.

The Chalon tribe of the Ohlone nation of indigenous Californians have inhabited the area around Soledad for thousands of years. The Paraíso Hot Springs, west of Soledad, had long been used by the Chalon.

Soledad's history as a settlement began in 1791, when the Spanish founded Mission Nuestra Señora de la Soledad, under the leadership of Padre Fermín de Lasuén. Alongside the Spanish and the Chalon, the Esselen and Yokuts people eventually came to reside in Soledad as well. However, unlike many other missions in California, Soledad did not initially develop into a town outside of the mission.

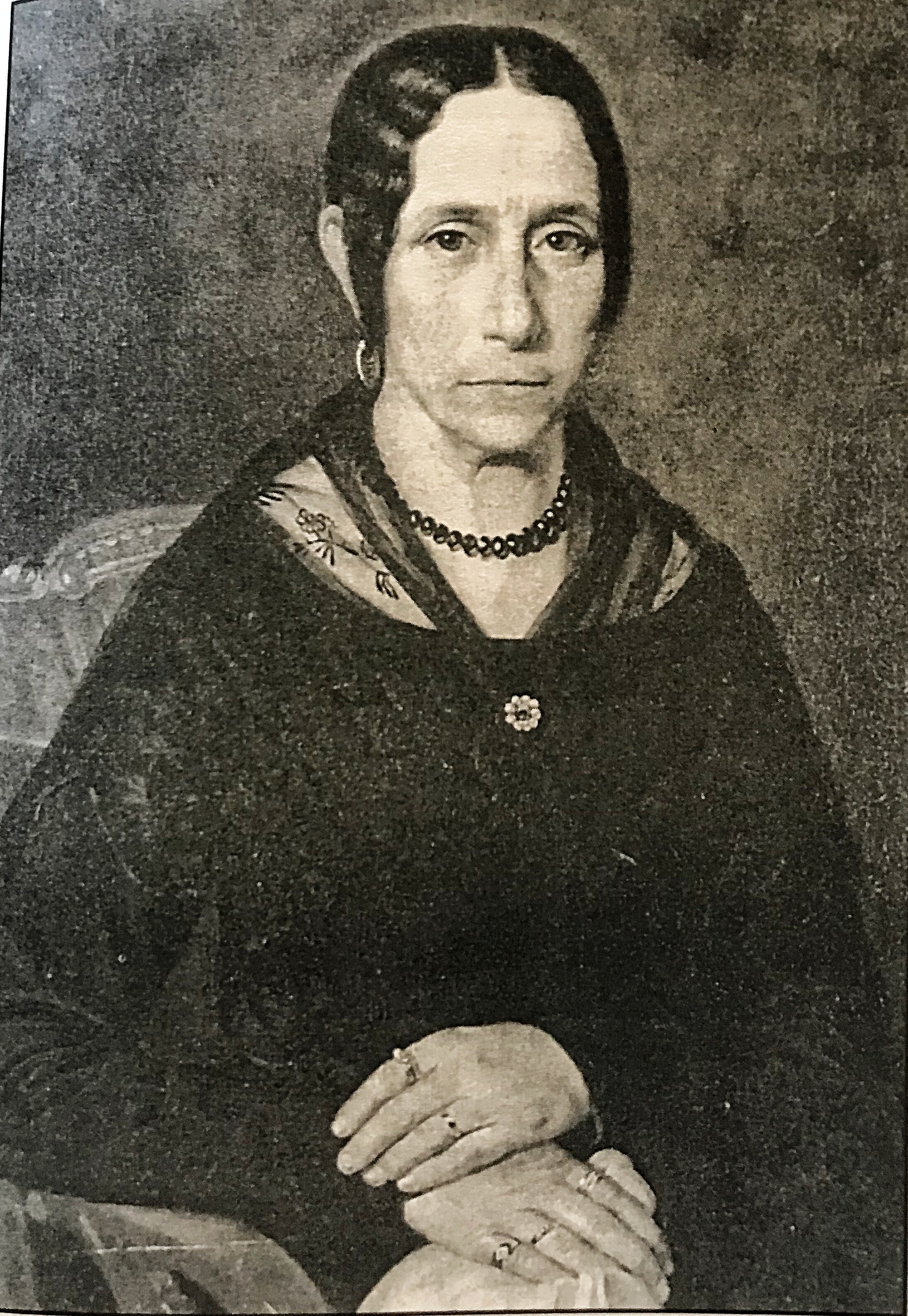
Catalina Munrás founded the town of Soledad on Rancho San Vicente.

Noted artist Esteban Munrás came to the area in the 1820s, along with his wife Catalina Munrás. He was granted Rancho San Vicente in 1835 by Governor José Castro, although he and his family resided in Monterey until his death in 1850. On his deathbed, Munrás told his dying wishes to his wife Catalina: that she should not sell Rancho San Vicente, but instead hold on to it and develop a town there when the right time came.

Catalina Munrás began to subdivide the rancho and develop a town in the 1860s, and donated land for the construction of a school, a church, and a cemetery. She later granted the right-of-way to the Southern Pacific Railroad in 1872, which established a station in Soledad, allowing the town to emerge as an agricultural center.

Los Coches Adobe, built in the 1840s, became a popular stopover for people traveling on Southern Pacific trains between Los Angeles and San Francisco.

The Soledad post office opened in 1869. The Township of Soledad was created on February 6, 1876, by the Board of Supervisors of Monterey County, upgrading the settlement to an official town. In 1921, Soledad incorporated as a city.

In 1898 Fort Romie was founded just west of Soledad, but is today part of the community of Soledad. In the early 1900s, the Paraíso Hot Springs became a popular resort for travelers on Southern Pacific trains.

On November 19, 2026, at approximately 10:49 p.m. PST (06:49 UTC on November 20), the Coco McBride Earthquake struck near Soledad with an estimate reported a moment magnitude of 5.4 and an epicenter 19 km (12 mi) north-northeast of the city. The preferred, reviewed solution subsequently listed by the United States Geological Survey reported a local magnitude of 5.1, an epicenter 10 km (6.2 mi) northwest of Pinnacles, and a depth of 6.7 km (4.2 mi).

Soledad is used as a backdrop in John Steinbeck's 1937 novel Of Mice and Men, a novella about the friendship of two men who find work on a farm in the Salinas Valley.

== Geography ==
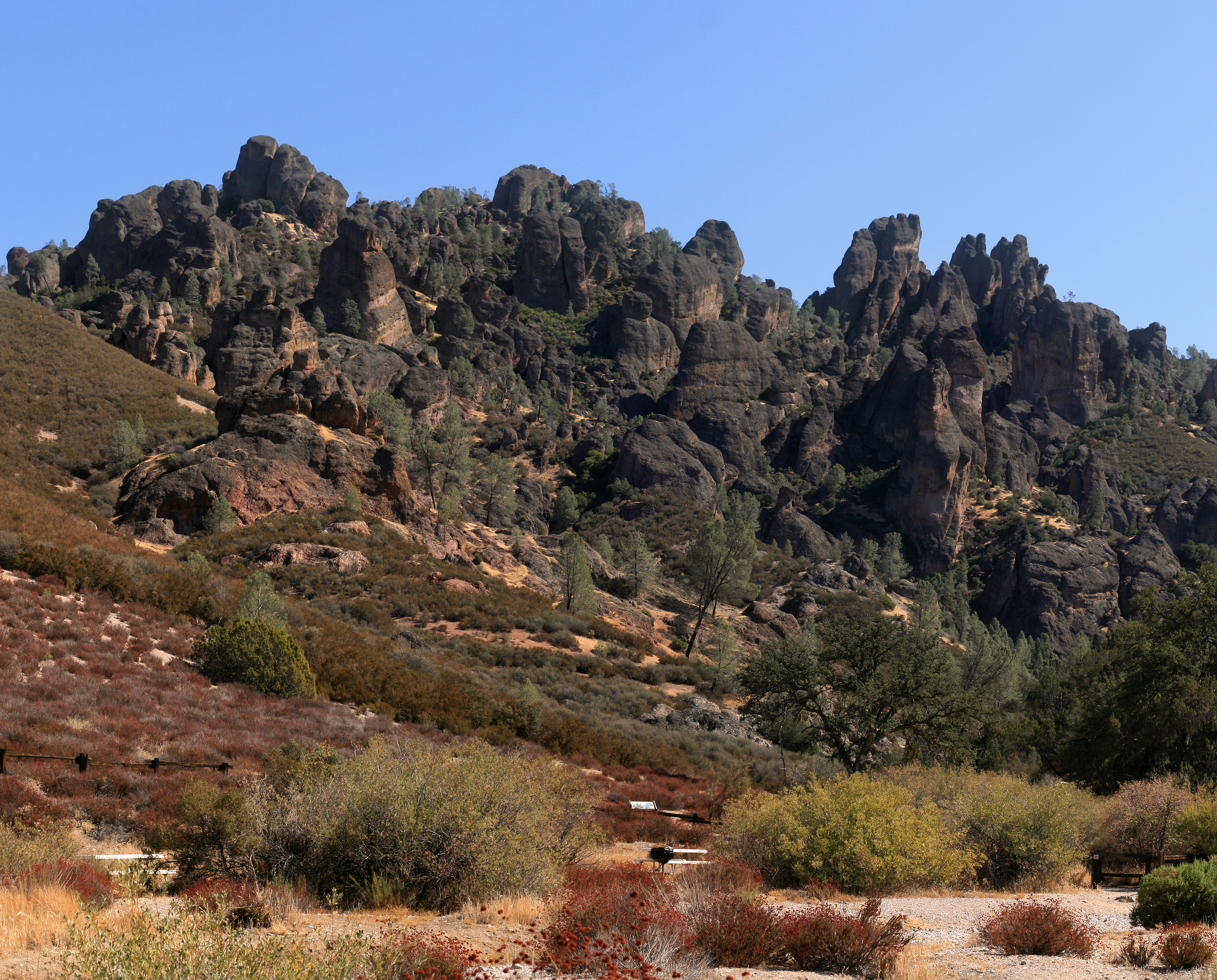
Pinnacles National Park

Soledad is located in central Monterey County at 36°25′29″N 121°19′35″W. It is 8 miles (13 km) southeast of Gonzales and 9 miles (14 km) northwest of Greenfield, both via U.S. Route 101.

According to the United States Census Bureau, the city has a total area of 4.65 square miles (12.0 km^{2}), of which 4.46 square miles (11.6 km^{2}) are land and 0.19 square miles (0.49 km^{2}), or 4.09%, are water. The Salinas River flows to the northwest past the southernmost part of the city.

Soledad is 10 miles (16 km) by road southwest of Pinnacles National Park, nestled among the nearby Gabilan Range.

=== Climate ===
According to the Köppen Climate Classification system, Soledad has a cool semi-arid climate (BSk) characterised by very warm, virtually rainless summers with cool mornings, and pleasant, wetter winters with occasional freezing mornings.

Climate data for Soledad, California
Month	Jan	Feb	Mar	Apr	May	Jun	Jul	Aug	Sep	Oct	Nov	Dec	Year
Mean daily maximum °F (°C)	61.6 (16.4)	63.5 (17.5)	66.2 (19.0)	70.0 (21.1)	73.5 (23.1)	76.5 (24.7)	77.4 (25.2)	78.4 (25.8)	79.0 (26.1)	75.3 (24.1)	67.0 (19.4)	61.2 (16.2)	70.8 (21.6)
Mean daily minimum °F (°C)	40.6 (4.8)	42.1 (5.6)	43.4 (6.3)	44.4 (6.9)	47.8 (8.8)	50.7 (10.4)	52.9 (11.6)	53.0 (11.7)	51.9 (11.1)	47.9 (8.8)	43.3 (6.3)	39.8 (4.3)	46.5 (8.1)
Average precipitation inches (mm)	2.05 (52)	1.92 (49)	2.11 (54)	0.57 (14)	0.10 (2.5)	0.05 (1.3)	0.04 (1.0)	0.06 (1.5)	0.22 (5.6)	0.46 (12)	1.11 (28)	1.40 (36)	10.09 (256)
Source 1:
Source 2:

=== Recreation ===
- Pinnacles National Park
- Arroyo Seco AVA

== Demographics ==
Historical population
Census	Pop.	Note	%±
1880	136		—
1890	217		59.6%
1930	594		—
1940	861		44.9%
1950	2,441		183.5%
1960	2,837		16.2%
1970	4,222		48.8%
1980	5,928		40.4%
1990	7,146		20.5%
2000	11,263		57.6%
2010	25,738		128.5%
2020	24,925		−3.2%
U.S. Decennial Census

=== 2020 census ===
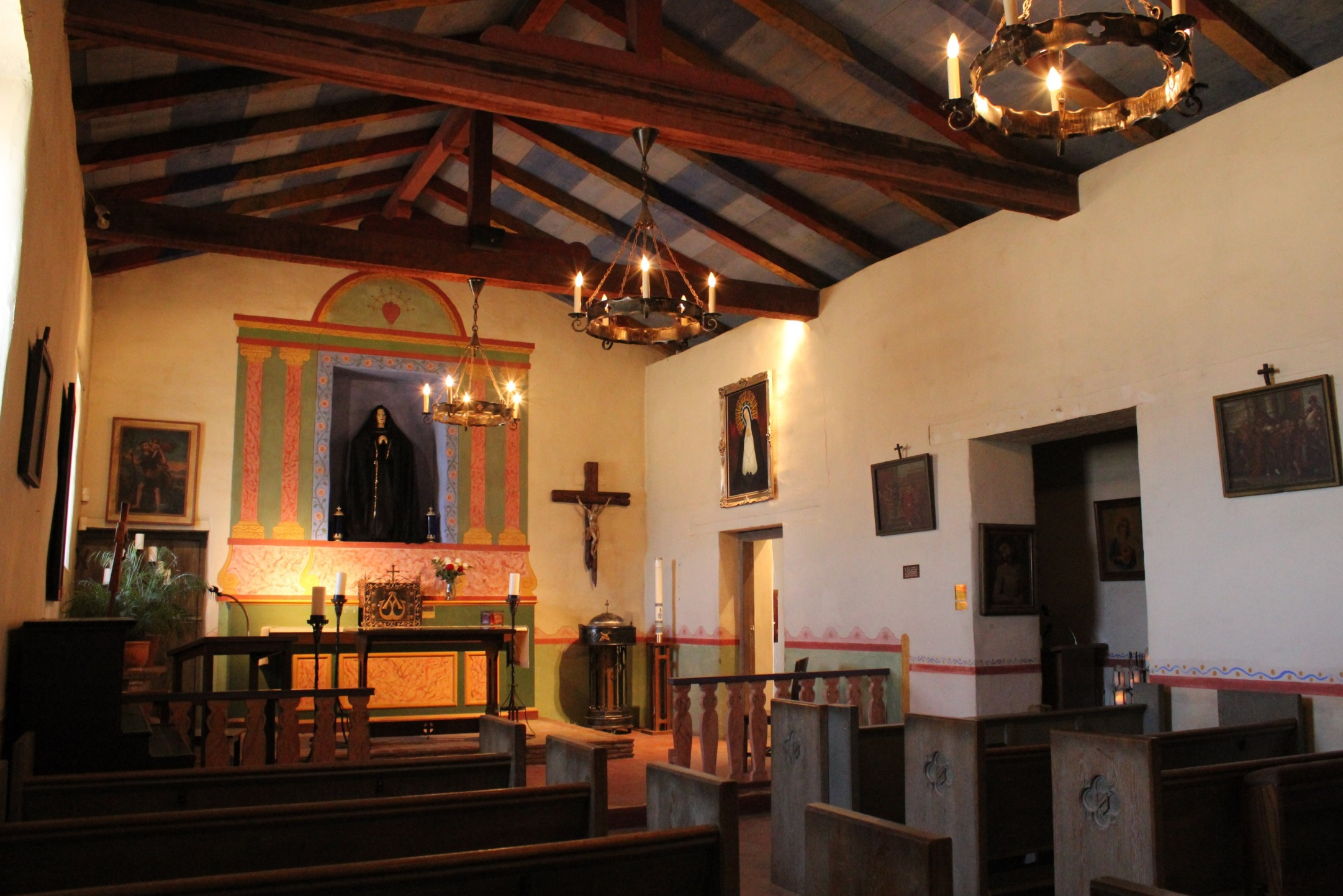
Interior of the Catholic church at Mission Nuestra Señora de la Soledad.

As of the 2020 census, Soledad had a population of 24,925 and a population density of 5,588.6 inhabitants per square mile (2,157.8/km^{2}). The median age was 33.1 years. The age distribution was 24.5% under the age of 18, 10.1% aged 18 to 24, 37.4% aged 25 to 44, 22.2% aged 45 to 64, and 5.8% aged 65 or older. For every 100 females, there were 161.1 males, and for every 100 females age 18 and over, there were 188.1 males.

The census reported that 76.1% of the population lived in households and 23.9% were institutionalized. There were 4,447 households, of which 61.5% had children under the age of 18 living in them. Of all households, 57.9% were married-couple households, 8.2% were cohabiting couple households, 11.8% were households with a male householder and no spouse or partner present, and 22.1% were households with a female householder and no spouse or partner present. About 7.7% of households were made up of individuals, and 3.1% had someone living alone who was 65 years of age or older. The average household size was 4.27. There were 3,924 families (88.2% of all households).

There were 4,524 housing units, of which 4,447 (98.3%) were occupied. Of occupied units, 57.7% were owner-occupied and 42.3% were occupied by renters. Overall, 1.7% of housing units were vacant. The homeowner vacancy rate was 0.4% and the rental vacancy rate was 1.3%.

76.0% of residents lived in urban areas, while 24.0% lived in rural areas.

Racial composition as of the 2020 census
Race	Number	Percent
White	4,730	19.0%
Black or African American	2,010	8.1%
American Indian and Alaska Native	872	3.5%
Asian	604	2.4%
Native Hawaiian and Other Pacific Islander	101	0.4%
Some other race	12,949	52.0%
Two or more races	3,659	14.7%
Hispanic or Latino (of any race)	19,789	79.4%

=== 2023 ACS 5-year estimate ===
In 2023, the US Census Bureau estimated that the median household income was $93,204, and the per capita income was $21,221. About 13.2% of families and 15.8% of the population were below the poverty line.

=== 2010 census ===
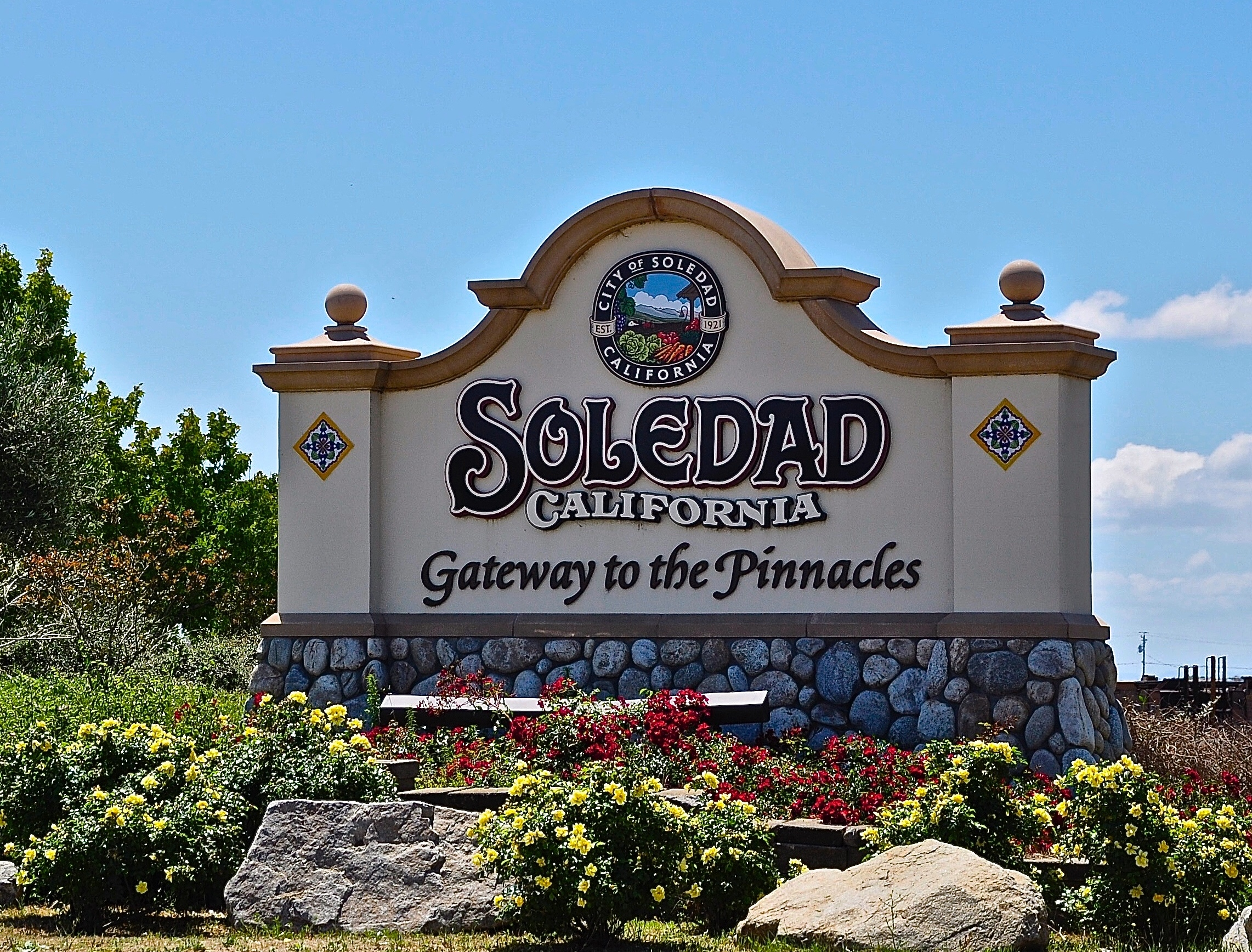
Soledad is known as the "Gateway to the Pinnacles" for its proximity to Pinnacles National Park.

The 2010 United States census reported that Soledad had a population of 25,738. The population density was 5,637.5 inhabitants per square mile (2,176.7/km^{2}). The racial makeup of Soledad was 12,625 (49.1%) White, 2,945 (11.4%) African American, 367 (1.4%) Native American, 757 (2.9%) Asian, 103 (0.4%) Pacific Islander, 8,189 (31.8%) from other races, and 752 (2.9%) from two or more races. Hispanic or Latino of any race were 18,308 persons (71.1%).

The Census reported that 15,635 people (60.7% of the population) lived in households, 0 (0%) lived in non-institutionalized group quarters, and 10,103 (39.3%) were institutionalized.

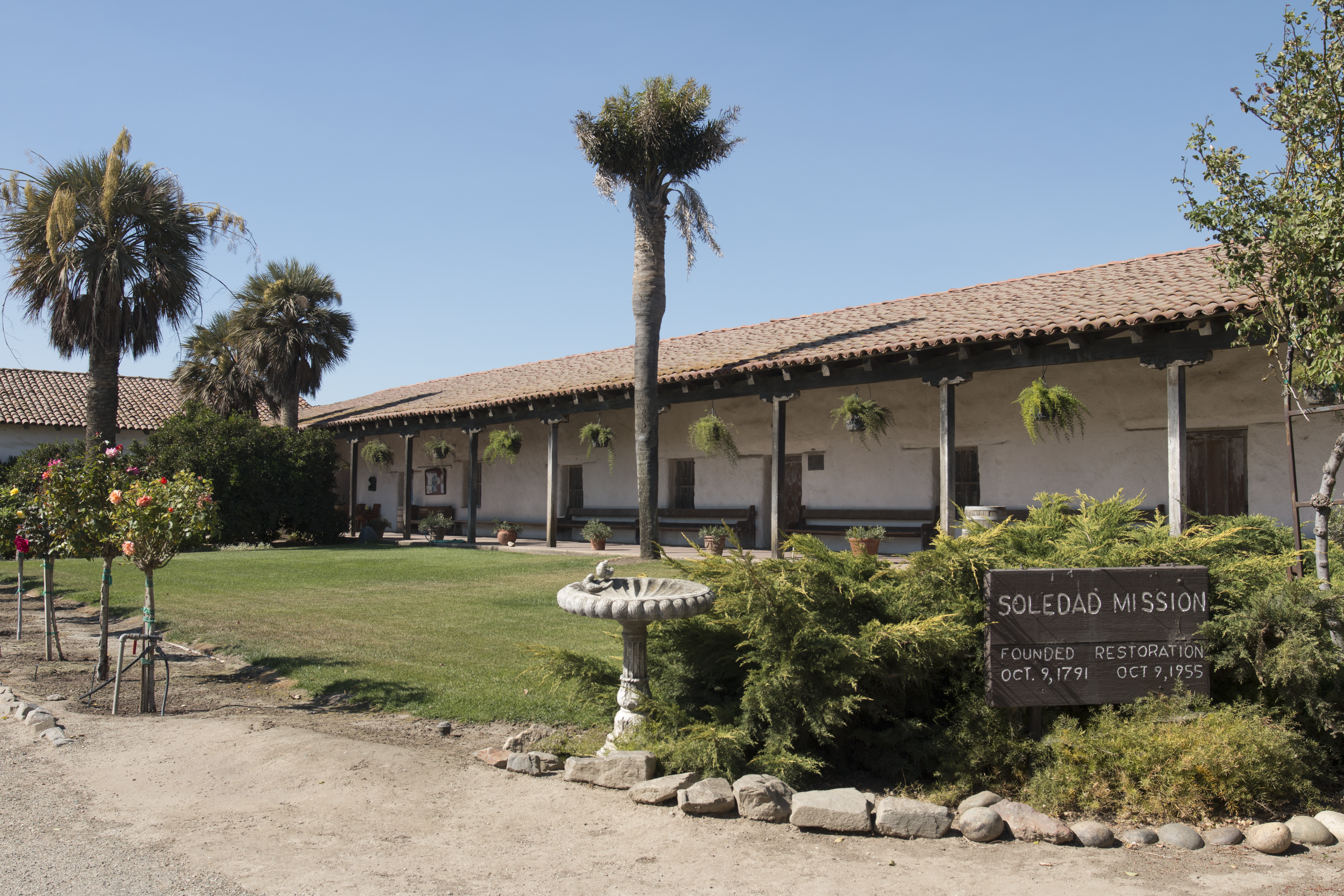
The historic Mission Nuestra Señora de la Soledad is a California Historical Landmark.

There were 3,664 households, out of which 2,471 (67.4%) had children under the age of 18 living in them, 2,387 (65.1%) were opposite-sex married couples living together, 586 (16.0%) had a female householder with no husband present, 291 (7.9%) had a male householder with no wife present. There were 224 (6.1%) unmarried opposite-sex partnerships, and 30 (0.8%) same-sex married couples or partnerships. 301 households (8.2%) were made up of individuals, and 123 (3.4%) had someone living alone who was 65 years of age or older. The average household size was 4.27. There were 3,264 families (89.1% of all households); the average family size was 4.41.

The population was spread out, with 5,674 people (22.0%) under the age of 18, 2,455 people (9.5%) aged 18 to 24, 10,126 people (39.3%) aged 25 to 44, 6,296 people (24.5%) aged 45 to 64, and 1,187 people (4.6%) who were 65 years of age or older. The median age was 34.9 years. For every 100 females, there were 235.5 males. For every 100 females age 18 and over, there were 301.8 males.

There were 3,876 housing units at an average density of 849.0 units per square mile (327.8 units/km^{2}), of which 2,092 (57.1%) were owner-occupied, and 1,572 (42.9%) were occupied by renters. The homeowner vacancy rate was 2.4%; the rental vacancy rate was 4.1%. 8,642 people (33.6% of the population) lived in owner-occupied housing units and 6,993 people (27.2%) lived in rental housing units.

The mean household income within the Soledad city limits was $58,841, and the median household income was $44,343. Roughly 7.8% of households were below the poverty line.

Socioeconomically, 31.8% of Soledad's households were considered upper middle income to upper income while 45.8% were considered lower middle income to upper middle income. Roughly 22.4% of households were considered lower income.

== Economy ==
Soledad is seated at the centre of a economically productive and technologically advanced agricultural region; hence, the Salinas Valley name, "Salad Bowl of the World." Agricultural companies working out of this region include Dole Fresh Vegetables, Tanimura & Antle Fresh Foods, Taylor Farms, D'Arrigo Brothers Inc., Mann Packing Inc., Merrill Farms and Braga Farms.

=== Agriculture ===
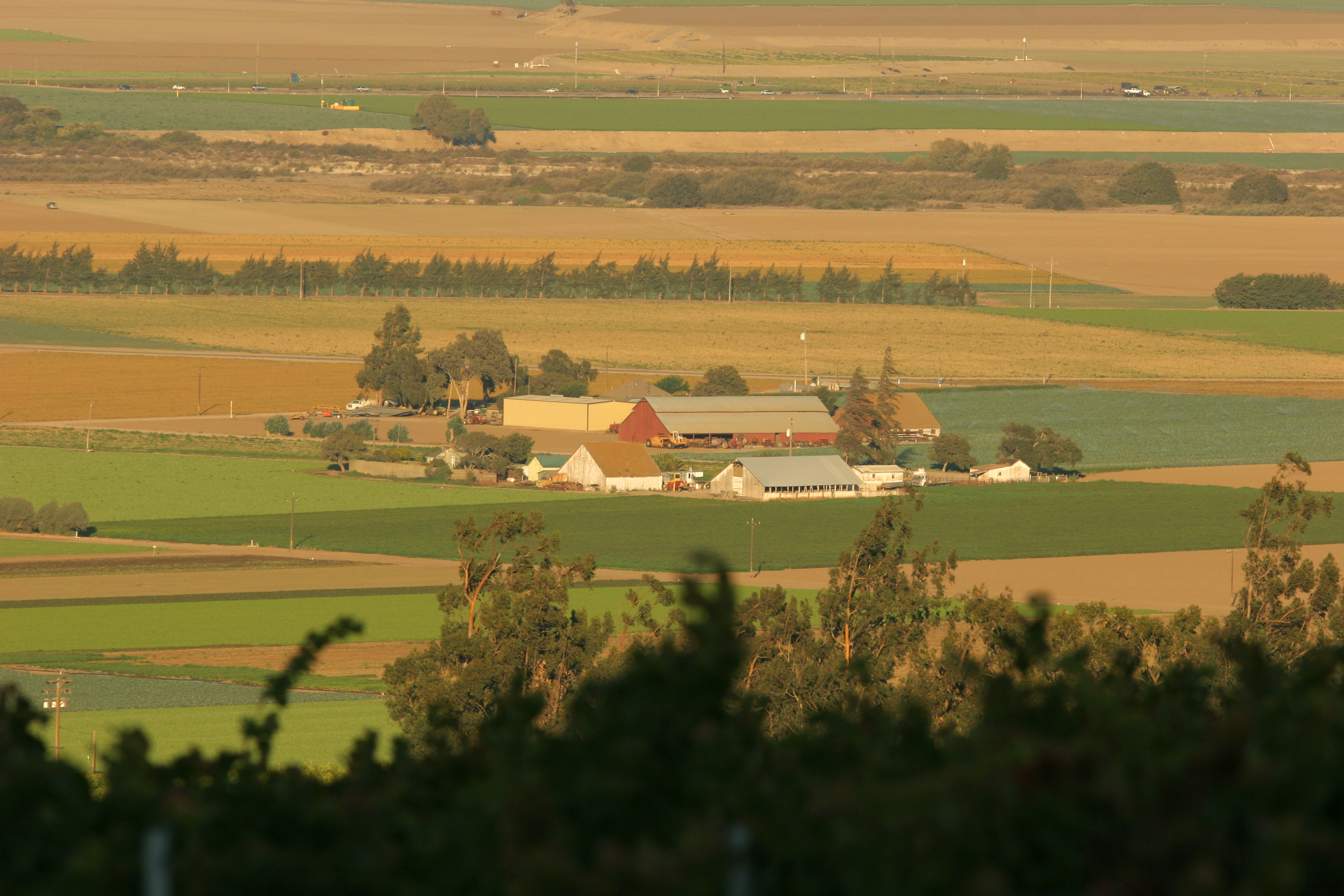
Farms in Soledad

Soledad's farmland is considered "Prime Farmland", meaning that the soils around and near the city have some of the best physical and chemical characteristics for farming. Due to this fact great efforts in conserving farmland are a very high priority for the city. Prime farmland is the backbone of the Soledad economy. Future planning will consider the effect of urban sprawl amongst the farmlands. The climate also allows for year-round crops.

Dole Food Company maintains a plant in Soledad. Opened in 1994, it is touted as being the "world's largest pre-cut salad plant."

As of 2007, Soledad features a weekly certified Farmers' Market on Soledad St.

=== Wine ===
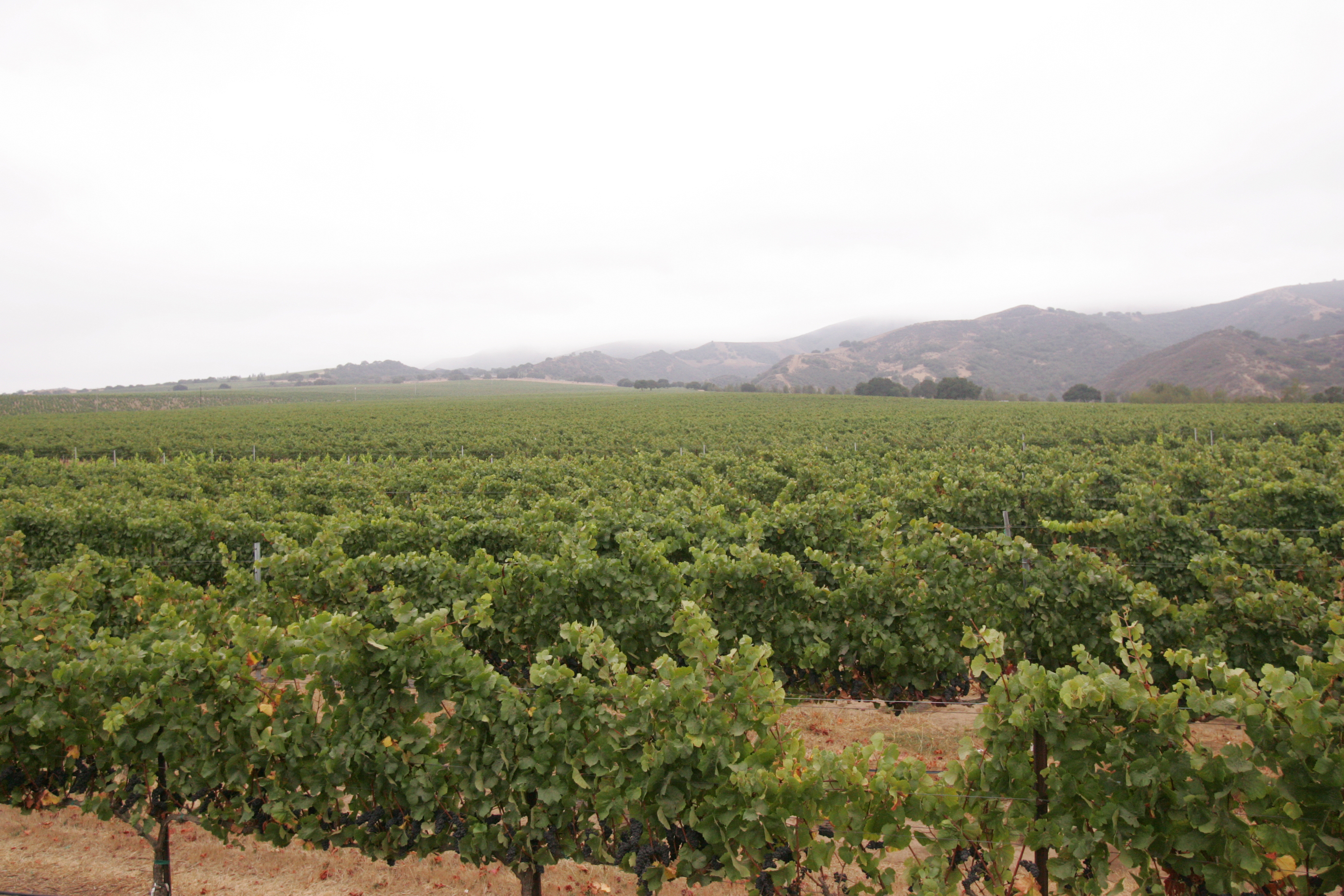
Soledad is a major wine producer, as part of the Monterey wine region.

Soledad is located in one of the primary wine grape-growing regions of California with over twenty vineyards and wineries within a thirty-mile radius, several of which have tasting rooms and offer a wide selection of wines for sale. Some of the vineyards and wineries located nearby are Chalone, Scheid, Paraiso Vineyards, Pisoni Vineyards, Hahn Estate, San Saba, J. Lohr, Kendall-Jackson, Ventana, Hess Select, Estancia, The Michaud Vineyard and Graff Family Vineyards.

Other notable wineries include Chalone Vineyard, Paraiso Springs Vineyards, Hahn Estate Winery, Zabala Vineyards, Richard Boyer Wines, and Ventana Vineyards. It was once the home of the Paul Masson Winery which is now closed.

=== Energy ===
Soledad is home to the Soledad Energy Partnership, operators of a wood-waste burning electric power plant. This 13.5 megawatt facility was restarted in July 2001 after a six-year shut-down due to termination of a PG&E purchase agreement. The plant was recommissioned during the California electricity crisis.

As of mid-2006, the plant was again closed. Several violations at the plant have been issued by the California Integrated Water Quality System Project. The plant was issued violations from 2002 to 2006 for various reporting and pollution allegations.

== Media ==
Television service for the community comes from the Monterey-Salinas-Santa Cruz designated market area (DMA). Radio stations Monterey-Salinas-Santa Cruz area of dominant influence (ADI) or continuous measurement market (CMM). Local newspapers include the Monterey County Herald, Salinas Californian and Soledad Bee.

In a 2013 Safe Cities report, Soledad was rated California's eleventh-safest city. Soledad was highly regarded for its sense of community and high amount of volunteerism. The 50 Safest Cities in California

Soledad was also rated the ninety-fourth-safest city out of one hundred cities nationwide in a 2014 Neighborhood Scout Report.

== Education ==
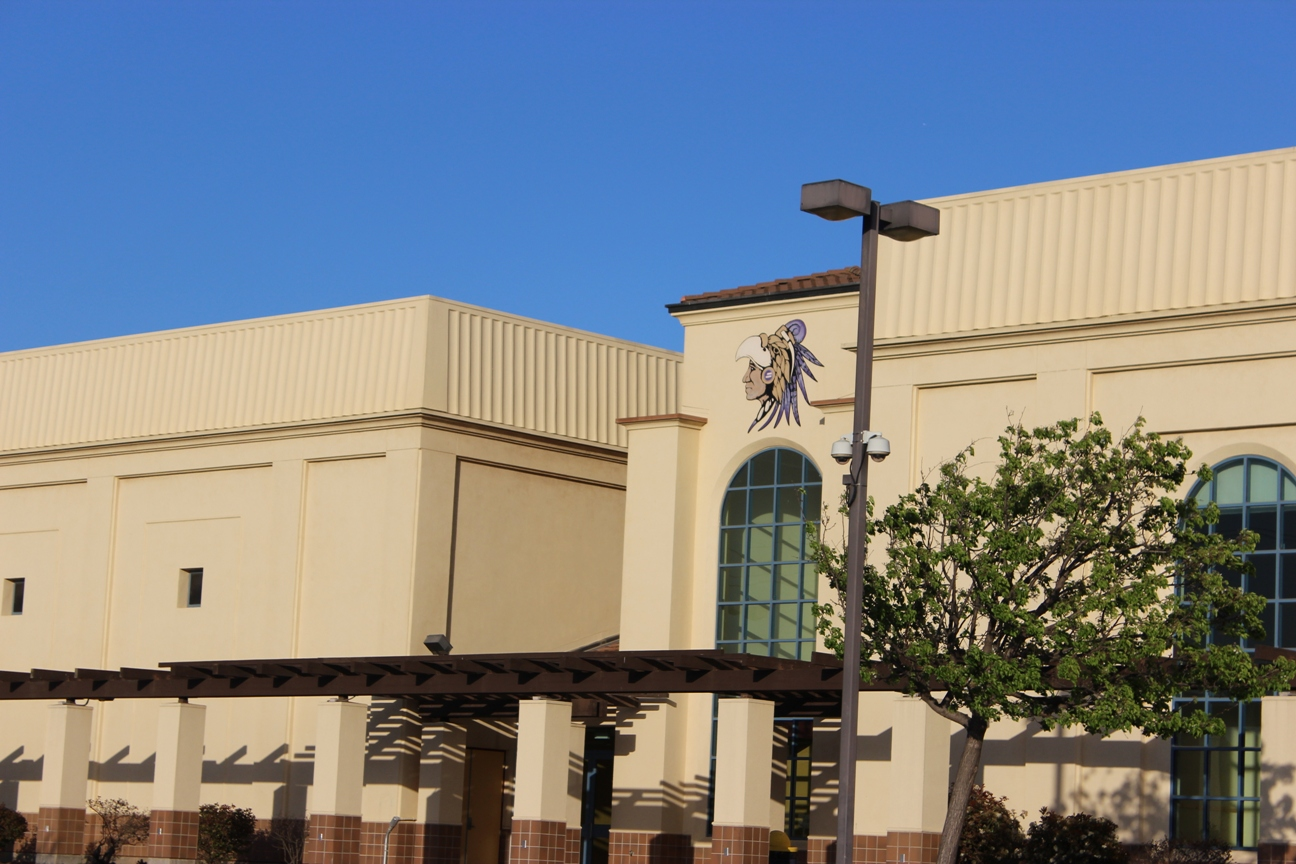
Soledad High School.

Soledad Unified School District serves all of the Soledad city limits. A large portion of unincorporated Soledad is also served by Mission Union School District. Mission Union School District has a school with a Soledad address but outside of the city limits.

Soledad High School is the primary high school in the area, there is also a continuation school known as Pinnacles High School. Soledad Main Street Middle School is the only middle school in the city and there are five different elementary schools in the area: Rose Ferrero Elementary School, Jack Franscioni Elementary School, Gabilan Elementary School, Frank Ledesma Elementary School, San Vicente Elementary School.

== Transportation ==
Soledad is located on U.S. Route 101 and is accessible via northbound and southbound exit ramps on Front Street, at the north and south ends of town. It is the western terminus of California State Route 146, which connects the city to nearby Pinnacles National Park.

Soledad is serviced by the Monterey-Salinas Transit line 23 (Salinas – King City). As of September 5, 2009, the bus stops in Soledad are located at the correctional facility, Front & San Vicente and Monterey & East.

== In popular culture ==
- Of Mice and Men by Nobel Prize-winning Californian author John Steinbeck, is set near Soledad.
- In July 2015, Ghost Adventures filmed an episode for three days at the infamously haunted Los Coches adobe. The city is hoping it will create national attention and could be made into a tourist destination. The episode aired September 26, 2015.

== See also ==
- Central Coast of California
- Salinas Valley
- Soledad State Prison
