= Fermín de Lasuén =

Basque Franciscan missionary

Fermín de Lasuén OFM
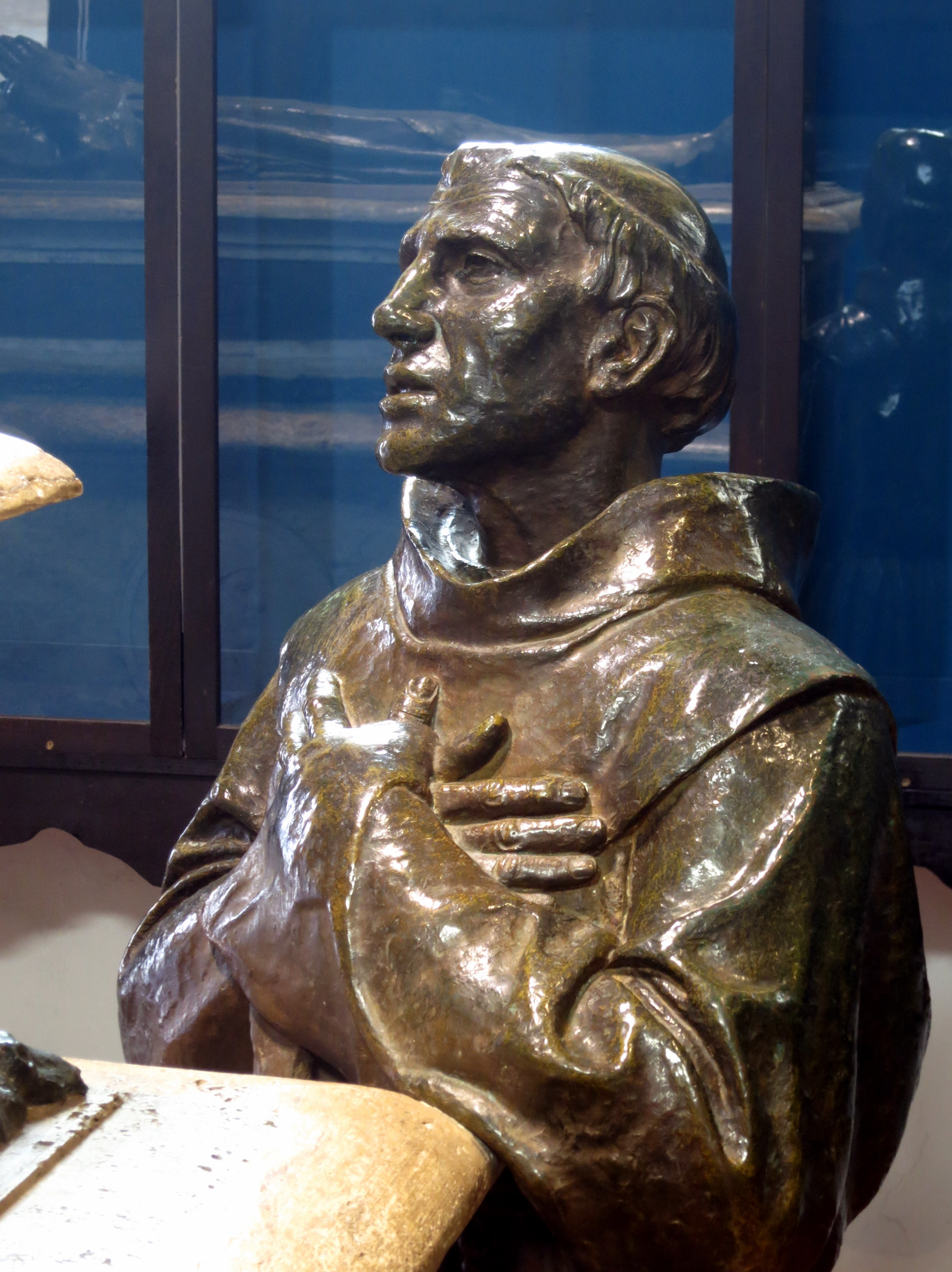
- Statue of Lasuén as depicted on a Junípero Serra cenotaph at Mission Carmel
- Born: 1736; Vitoria, Basque Country, Spain, Spanish Empire
- Died: 1803 (aged 66–67); Mission San Carlos Borromeo de Carmelo, Alta California, Spanish Empire
- Occupation: Missionary

Fermín de Francisco Lasuén de Arasqueta (7 June 1736 – Mission de San Carlos (California), 26 June 1803) was a Spanish Basque Franciscan missionary to Alta California, Spanish Empire. president of the Franciscan missions there, and founder of nine of the twenty-one Spanish missions in California.

== Biography ==
Although he is sometimes called the "forgotten friar," Fermín Lasuén actually governed the California Mission system three years longer than his more famous predecessor, Junípero Serra. Lasuén was born at Vitoria in Álava, Spain, on 7 July 1736 and joined the Franciscan order as a teenager, entering the Friary of San Francisco shortly before his fifteenth birthday on 19 March 1751. On 19 March 1751, Lasuén was ceremoniously invested with his Franciscan habit.

In 1759, Lasuén left the Franciscan Sanctuary of Arantzazu (Gipuzkoa). He then set sail from Cádiz with seventeen other friars while still a deacon to volunteer for ministry in the Americas. He arrived in New Spain in 1761 and was sent west to Las Californias in 1768. Following the establishment of Mission San Diego de Alcalá in 1769, he moved north to Alta California in 1773. He based himself in San Diego and remained there until 1775; he helped establish Mission San Juan Capistrano before the murder of Luís Jayme. Kumeyaay Indian unrest caused his return to San Diego.

In late 1776 he went to San Luis Obispo before again returning to San Diego in 1777 when he was made minister there. He was appointed the second Presidente of the missions in California in 1785, following the death of Junípero Serra, and transferred to Mission San Carlos Borromeo de Carmelo. Lasuén continued the work begun by Serra, establishing 9 more missions, bringing the total to 18 (the final total was 21).

He died at Mission San Carlos Borromeo de Carmelo on 26 July 1803. On his death he was succeeded by Esteban Tápis.

== Intellect, personality and character ==
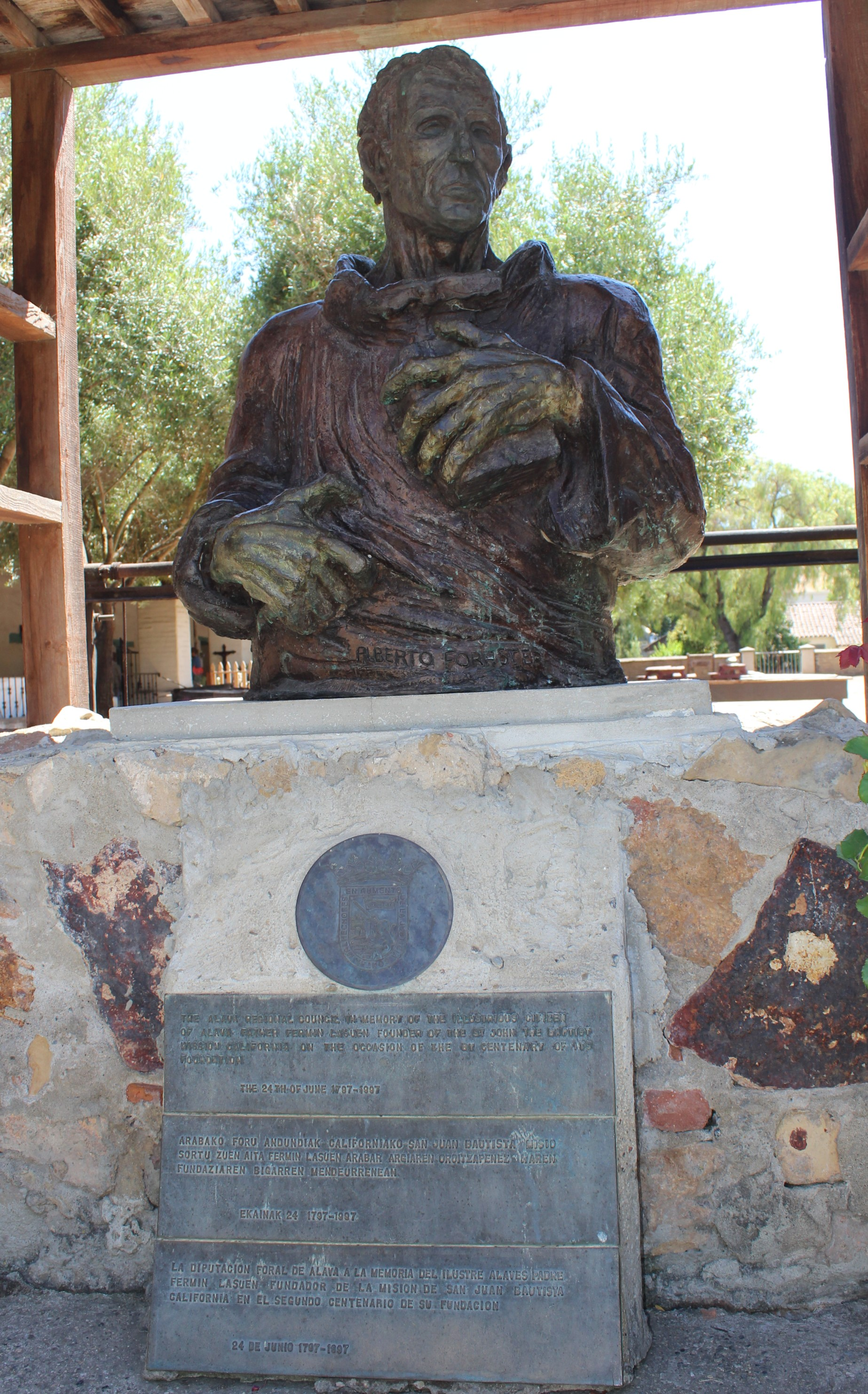
Statue of Fermín de Lasuén in San Juan Bautista

Although of a more introspective and brooding temperament than his predecessor Junipero Serra, Lasuén was a dedicated and capable administrator, founding the remaining California missions. Captain Alessandro Malaspina described Lasuén as such: "... a man who in Christian lore, piety and conduct was truly apostolic, and his manner and learning unusual." It is clear from his diaries that Lasuén struggled with loneliness and perhaps some depression brought about by the extreme conditions he encountered in San Diego when he was asked to return to restore order after the murder of Fray Jayme. Lasuén described the ardors of missionary life as such:

"A missionary priest has to engage in many duties, many of which only concern him as a means to something else. He is responsible for the spiritual and temporal welfare of people who are many and varied. He has individuals who are more dependent on him than small children, for there are many needs that arise ... and many different things to be done for the different groups that make up the community. He is surrounded by pagans, and placed in charge of neophytes who can be trusted but a little."

At age 47, writing to his friend Fray Joseph de Jesus Maria Velez in 1783, Lasuén stated:

"I am already old and entirely gray and although [to some extent] this is caused by my age, yet the difficult exercise of my position here has also brought this about, especially during the five years I am about to celebrate as minister of San Diego. This land is for apostles only and its people call for apostolic men greater than I happen to be; but (thanks to God) I enjoy good health and shall try to use it to some good purpose, although somewhat languidly."

== Relationship with Junipero Serra and Felipe de Neve ==
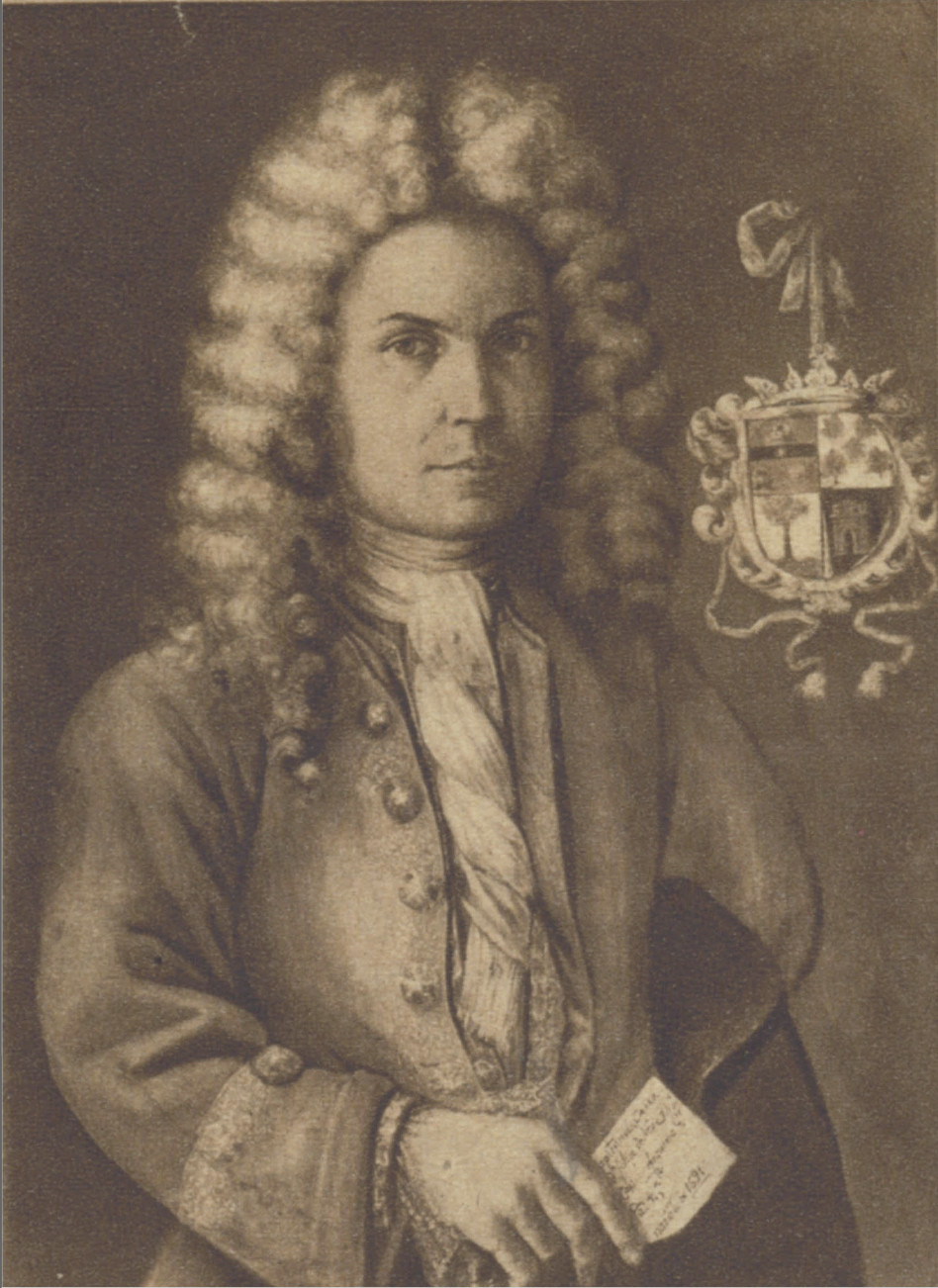
Felipe de Neve, 4th Governor of the Californias

In 1774, Fermin Lasuén requested to return to the College of San Fernando in Mexico City. The request was denied, and Lasuén was eventually appointed by Padre Serra as rector of Mission San Diego, which was considered at the time to be the poorest and most unstable of the existing missions. Lasuén was fearful of Indian uprisings, and often wrote Serra and Felipe de Neve, Governor of California (1777 to 1782) about his difficulties, seeking advice about the placement of both friaries and the number of troops to guard the mission properties. His Christian zeal and sense of "civilizing" purpose led him to great lengths in order to acculturate Native Americans, even using their language in his pursuit, despite the Spanish king's prohibition in that respect. News of the mistreatment of Native Americans in the Mission of San Francisco reached the governor of California Diego de Borica, also a Basque, who warned of a lawsuit against Lasuén should he not give up on his practices. Although it is clear that, at points during their ministry and friendship, they did not always agree about how to discipline the Indians and protect mission property, Lasuén wrote that Serra was a "most exemplary superior and a holy man."

== Missions founded by Fray Fermín Lasuén ==
- Mission Santa Barbara (1786)
- Mission La Purísima Concepción (1787)
- Mission Santa Cruz (1791)
- Mission Nuestra Señora de la Soledad (1791)
- Mission San José (1797)
- Mission San Juan Bautista (1797)
- Mission San Miguel Arcángel (1797)
- Mission San Fernando Rey de España (1797)
- Mission San Luis Rey de Francia (1798)

He also oversaw the expansion of many of the California mission sites and helped many other missions like Mission San Gabriel Arcángel.

Catholic Church titles
Preceded by Francisco Palóu	President-General of the Missions of Alta California; 1785–1803	Succeeded by Esteban Tápis
