= Soledad Unified School District =

School district in California, United States

Address
- 1261 Metz Road Soledad, California, 93960; United States

District information
- Type: Public
- Grades: K–12
- NCES District ID: 0637050

Students and staff
- Students: 4,911
- Teachers: 212.62
- Staff: 293.33
- Student–teacher ratio: 23.1

Other information
- Website: www.soledadusd.org

Soledad Unified School District (SUSD) is a school district headquartered in Soledad, California.

In 2020 superintendent Tim Vanoli announced that he was retiring.

As of 2021 the district is planning establishing housing for teachers, with an outside management company managing the facility.

== Schools ==
Secondary schools

- Soledad High School
- Main Street Middle School

Elementary schools

- Rose Ferrero Elementary School
- Jack Franscioni Elementary School
- Gabilan Elementary School
- Frank Ledesma Elementary School
- San Vicente Elementary School

Other

- Community Education Center
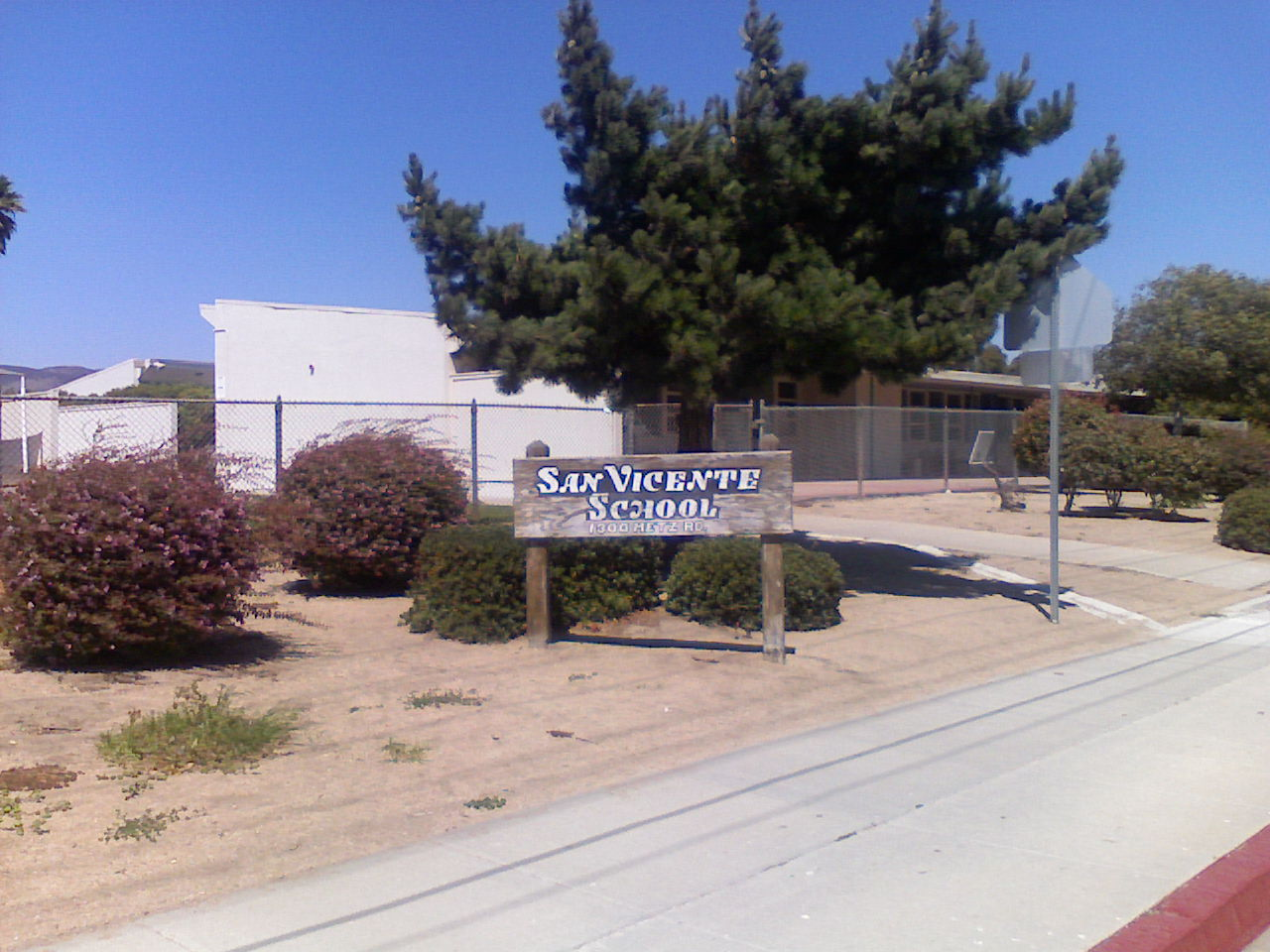
San Vicente School

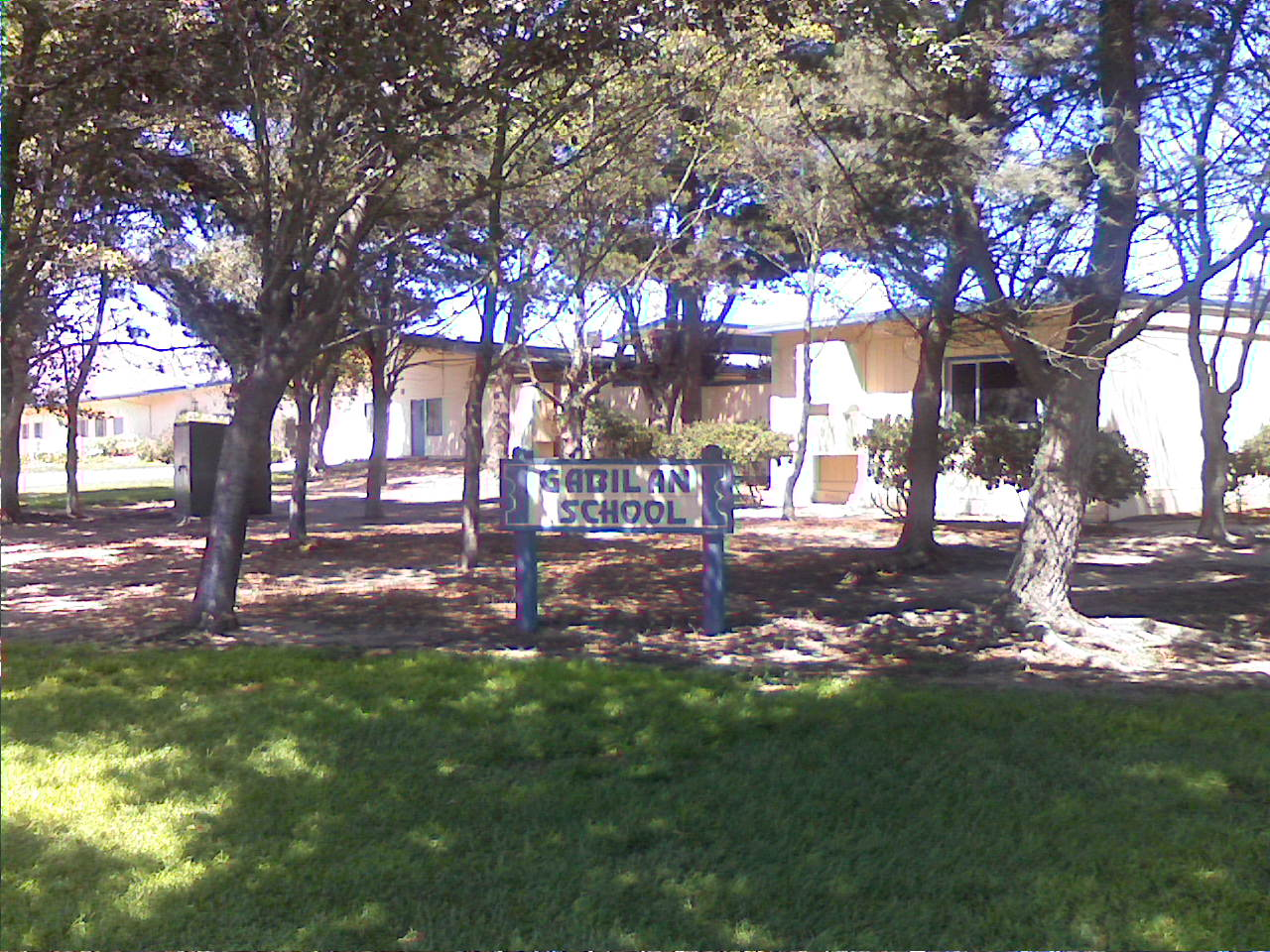
Gabilan School
