= Fort Romie, California =

Unincorporated community in California, United States

Fort Romie
- Unincorporated community
- Location in California
- Coordinates: 36°24′01″N 121°20′47″W
- Country: United States
- State: California
- County: Monterey
- Elevation: 187 ft (57 m)

Fort Romie, commonly known simply as Romie, is an unincorporated community in Monterey County, California, United States. It is located in the Salinas Valley, at an elevation of 187 feet (57 m).

== History ==
fort Romie was one of three Salvation Army Colonies established in America. The name honors Charles Romie, a landowner who sold the land, originally part of Rancho Ex-Mission Soledad, to the Salvation Army. The Salvation Army goal was to take poor families from the cities and bring them back to nature so that their lives would be improved. The Salvation Army sought people who had some knowledge of farming. Each family had 10 acres. A family with two children had a two-room house; those with three or more children had a four-room house. Everything was furnished to the settlers without charge: seed, sheds, tools equipment were provided by the Salvation Army for all to use, in return for which they contracted to make yearly payments of $100 for 10 years, after which they would own the land.

A post office operated at Romie from 1898 to 1900. The name honors Charles Romie, a landowner who sold the land to the Salvation Army to establish an agricultural community at the site in 1898.
