= Mission Nuestra Señora de la Soledad =

18th-century Spanish mission in California

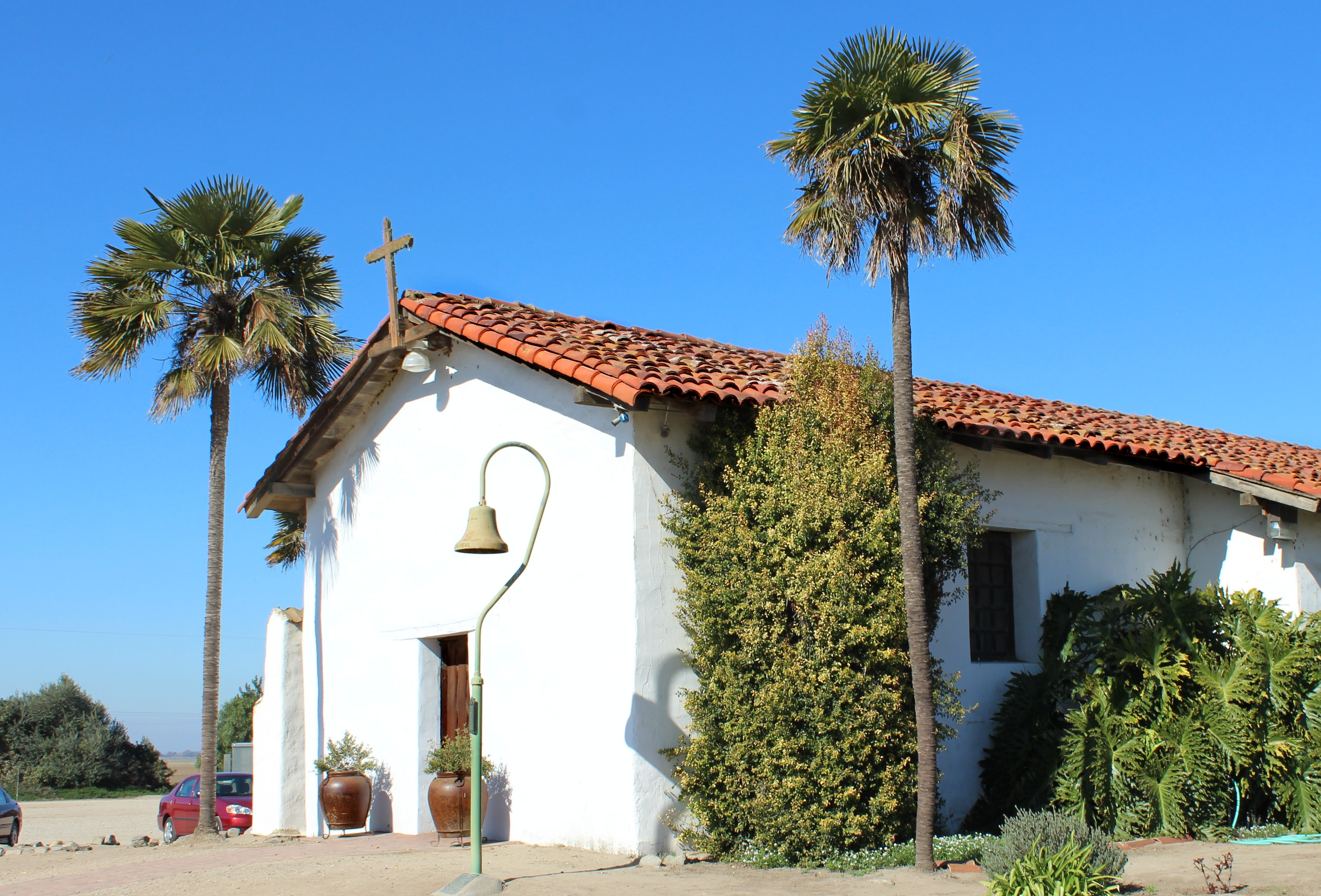
- Mission Nuestra Señora de la Soledad

- Location within California
- Location: 36641 Fort Romie Road; Soledad, California 93960
- Coordinates: 36°24′16.6278″N 121°21′20.9046″W
- Name as founded: La Misión de María Santísima, Nuestra Señora Dolorosísima de la Soledad
- English translation: The Mission of Mary Most Holy, Our Most Sorrowful Lady of Solitude
- Patron: Our Lady of Solitude, Our Most Sorrowful Lady of Solitude
- Nickname: "The Holy Mission"
- Founded: October 9, 1791
- Founded by: Fermín Francisco de Lasuén
- Founding Order: Thirteenth
- Military district: Third
- Native tribe: Chalon, Esselen, Yokuts, Salinan
- Native place name: Chuttusqelis
- Baptisms: 2,131 (by 1832)
- Marriages: 648 (by 1832)
- Burials: 1,705 (by 1832)
- Secularized: 1835
- Returned to the Church: 1859
- Governing body: Roman Catholic Diocese of Monterey
- Current use: Chapel / Museum

California Historical Landmark
- Reference no.: 1. 233

Mission Nuestra Señora de la Soledad (Spanish: Misión Nuestra Señora de la Soledad), commonly known as Mission Soledad, is a Spanish mission located in Soledad, California. The mission was founded by the Franciscan order on October 9, 1791, to convert the Native Americans living in the area to Catholicism. It was the thirteenth of California's Spanish missions, and is named for Mary, Our Lady of Solitude. The town of Soledad is named for the mission.

After the 1835 secularization of the mission and the later sale of building materials, the mission fell into a state of disrepair and soon after was left in ruins. A restoration project began in 1954 and a new chapel was dedicated in 1955. The chapel now functions as a chapel of Our Lady of Solitude, a parish church of the Diocese of Monterey. The priests' residence was later recreated, and functions as a museum.

== History ==
=== Mission era ===
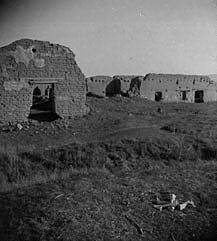
The ruins of Mission Nuestra Señora de la Soledad circa 1900.

Mission Nuestra Señora de la Soledad, La Misión de María Santísima, Nuestra Señora Dolorosísima de la Soledad (The Mission of Mary Most Holy, Our Lady of Sorrows of Solitude), was founded October 9, 1791 by Fermín Francisco de Lasuén, the 13th of 21 missions in California.

The Chalon, a subgroup of the Ohlone were converted and resided there, followed by Esselen and Yokuts people. By 1803, there were 627 Mission Indians at Mission Soledad. At the Mission many Chalon married local Esselen speakers, while others married Yokuts were brought into the mission between 1806 and 1834.

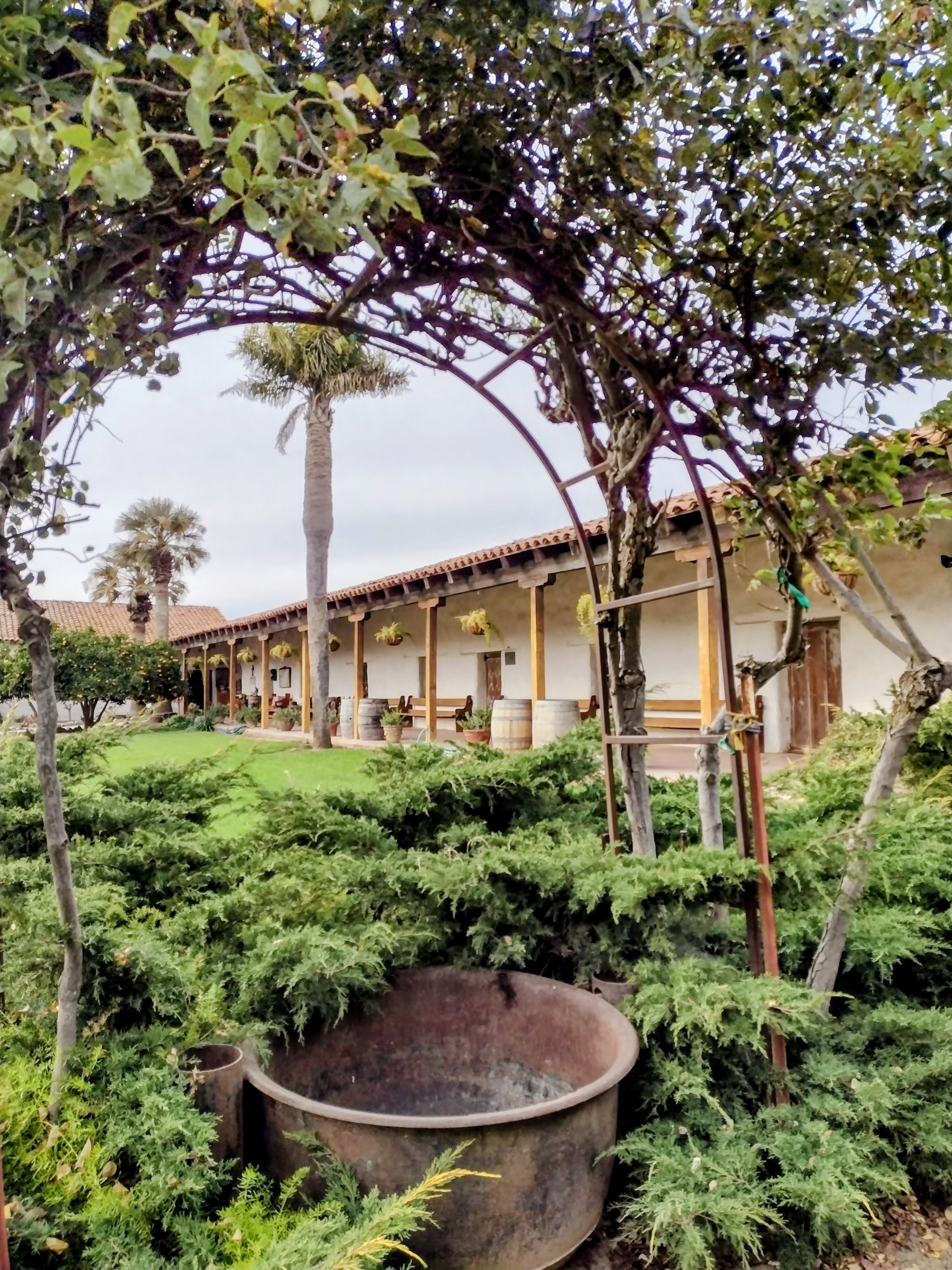
View from front garden

The mission's herds numbered 1,150 cattle, about 5,000 sheep, 30 swine, 670 horses, and 40 mules. Spanish Governor José Joaquín de Arrillaga was buried in the chapel after he died on July 24, 1814, during a visit to the Mission.

The mission was inundated by floods in 1824, 1828, and 1832, and following secularization (when Pio Pico sold the mission for a reported $800), the remaining buildings were looted for supplies. The mission's land became Rancho Ex-Mission Soledad.

== Restoration and reconstruction ==
In 1954, when the Mission Soledad restoration was begun, only piles of adobe dirt and a few wall sections from the cuadrángulo (quadrangle) remained. The chapel was reconstructed and dedicated under the auspices of the Native Daughters of the Golden West on October 9, 1955. The ruins of the quadrangle, cemetery, and some of the outer rooms, while not restored, can still be seen. Governor Arrillaga's grave was identified and given a new marker.

The Mission Nuestra Señora de la Soledad is now a functioning Catholic chapel and public museum.

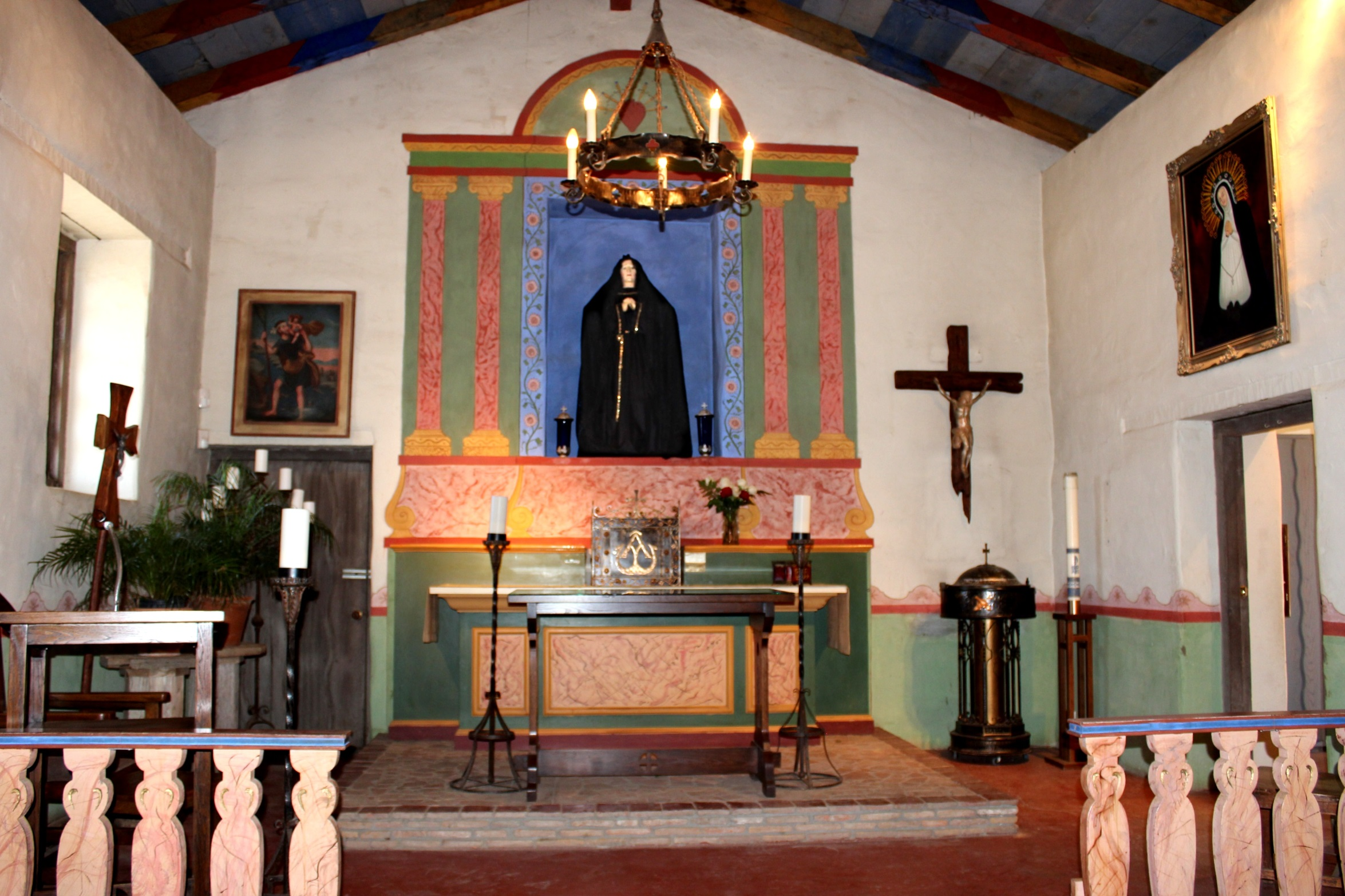
Mission Soledad altar and interior, 2015

== See also ==
- Spanish missions in California
- List of Spanish missions in California
- USNS Mission Soledad (AO-136) – a Buenaventura Class fleet oiler built during World War II.
