= List of United States Navy ships: M =

Ships of the United States Navy

Ships in current service
- Current ships

Ships grouped alphabetically
- A–B; C; D–F; G–H; I–K; L; M; N–O; P; Q–R; S; T–V; W–Z

Ships grouped by type
- Aircraft carriers; Airships; Amphibious warfare ships; Auxiliaries; Battlecruisers; Battleships; Cruisers; Destroyers; Destroyer escorts; Destroyer leaders; Escort carriers; Frigates; Hospital ships; Littoral combat ships; Mine warfare vessels; Monitors; Oilers; Patrol vessels; Registered civilian vessels; Sailing frigates; Steam frigates; Steam gunboats; Ships of the line; Sloops of war; Submarines; Torpedo boats; Torpedo retrievers; Unclassified miscellaneous; Yard and district craft

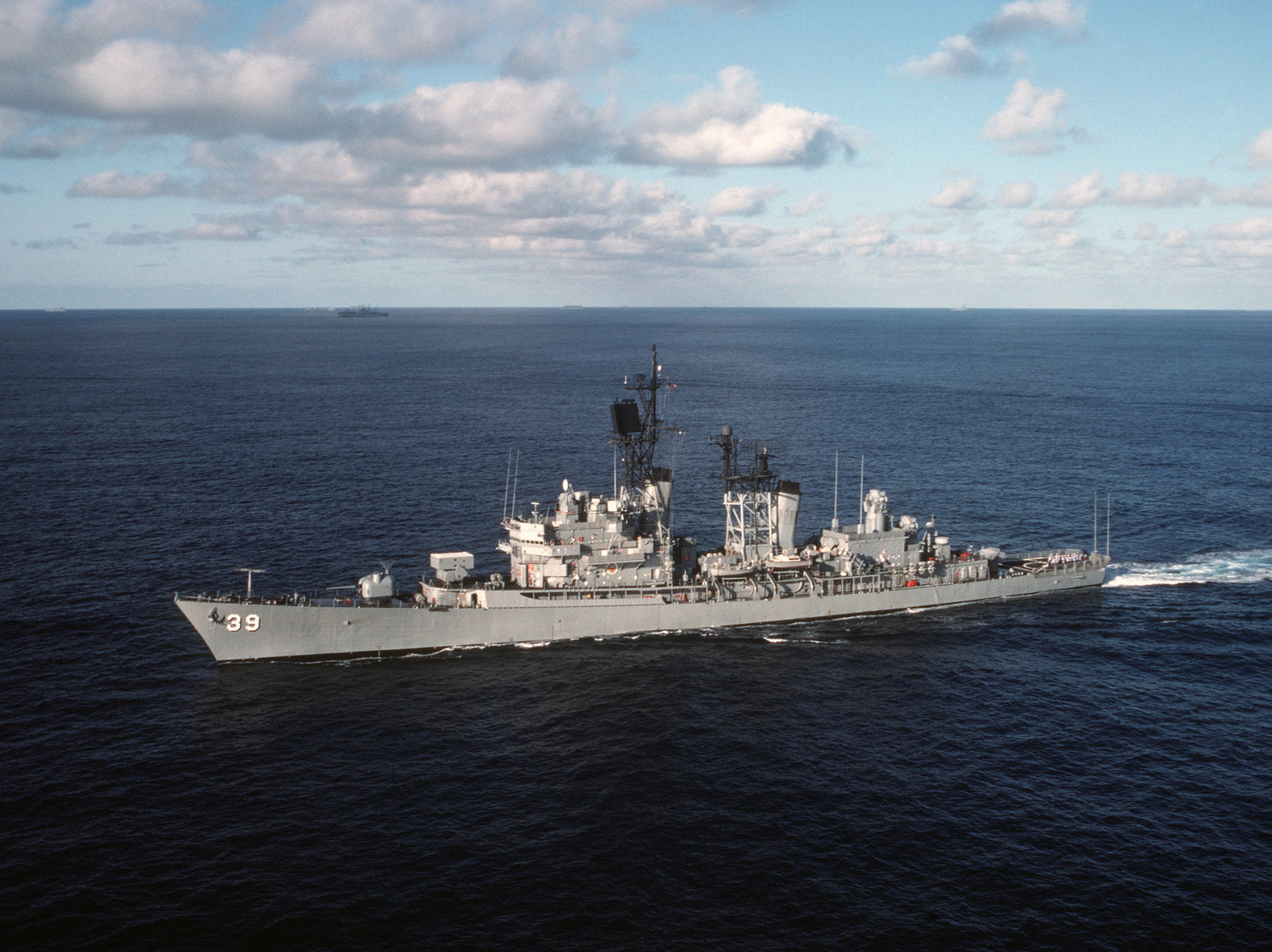
USS MacDonough (DDG-39)

This section of the list of United States Navy ships contains all ships of the United States Navy with names beginning with M.

For a list exclusively of currently commissioned ships, see the List of current ships of the United States Navy.

For ships with unique names, "USS Ship‍name" redirects to the ship article. For reused names, "USS Ship‍name" is an index page for the ships of that name; the links after the name lead to the specific ship pages.

== M–Mai ==
- USS M-1 (SS-47)
- USS M. J. Scanlon (ID-3513)
- USS M. M. Davis (SP-314)
- USS M. W. Chapin (1856)
- USS Maartensdijk (ID-2497)
- USS Macabi (SS-375)
- USS Macaw (ASR-11)
- USS Macdonough (DD-9, DD-331, DD-351, DL-8/DLG-8/DDG-39)
- USS Macedonian (1810, 1836)
- USS Machias (PG-5, PG-161/PF-53, PF-72)
- USS Machigonne (SP-507, SP-1043)
- USS Machinist (AFDB-8)
- USS Mack (DE-358)
- USS MacKenzie (TB-17, DD-175, DD-614)
- USS Mackerel (SS-204, SST-1)
- USS Mackinac (1902, AVP-13/WAVP-371/WHEC-371)
- USS Mackinaw (1863)
- USS MacLeish (DD-220/AG-87)
- USS Macomb (DD-458/DMS-23)
- USS Macon (ZRS-5, CA-132, PG-204/PF-96)
- USS Macona (ID-3305)
- USS Madawaska (1865, ID-3011)
- USS Maddox (DD-168, DD-622, DD-731)
- USS Madera (APA-244)
- USS Madera County (LST-905)
- USS Madgie (1858)
- USS Madison (1812, 1832, DD-425)
- USS Madokawando (YT-180/YTB-180/YTM-180)
- USS Madrono (1884)
- USNS Maersk Peary (T-AOT-5296)
- USS Magdalena (YFB-54, YFB-687)
- USS Maggie (SP-1202)
- USS Maggie Baker (1863)
- USS Magistrate (SP-143)
- USS Magnet (SP-563, AM-260, YDG-9/ADG-9)
- USS Magnolia (1857, WAGL-231, WAGL-328/WLB-328)
- USS Magoffin (APA-199/LPA-199)
- USS Magothy (1895, AVP-45)
- USS Magpie (AMc-2, AM-418, AMS-25, AMCU-29/MHC-29)
- USS Mahackemo (YT-223/YTB-223)
- USS Mahan (DD-102/DM-7, DD-364, DLG-11/DDG-42, DDG-72)
- USS Mahanna (AG-8)
- USS Mahaska (1861, YN-36/YNT-4/YTB-730)
- USS Mahlon S. Tisdale (FFG-27)
- USS Mahnomen County (LST-912)
- USS Mahoa (YTB-519/YTM-519)
- USS Mahogany (YN-18/AN-23)
- USS Mahonese (1846)
- USCGC Mahoning (WYT-91)
- USS Mahoning County (LST-914)
- USS Mahopac (1863, AT-29/ATO-29, ATA-196)
- USS Mail (1862)
- USS Maine (ACR-1, BB-10, BB-69, SSBN-741)
- USS Mainstay (AM-261/MSF-261)

== Maj–Maq ==
- MV Maj. Bernard F. Fisher (T-AK-4396)
- MV Maj. Stephen W. Pless (AK-3007)
- USS Majaba (AG-43/IX-102)
- USS Majestic (1861, SP-3061)
- USS Major (DE-796)
- USS Major Wheeler (SP-3637)
- USS Makah (YTB-509/YTM-772)
- USS Makassar Strait (CVE-91/CVU-91)
- USS Makin Island (CVE-93, LHD-8)
- USS Malabar (AF-37)
- USS Malanao (AG-44)
- USS Malang (ID-2623)
- USS Malay (SP-735)
- USS Malek Adhel (1840)
- USS Mallard (AM-44/ASR-4, AMCU-30/MHC-30)
- USS Malone (PC-553)
- USS Maloy (DE-791/APD-83/EDE-791)
- USS Malvern (1860, SP-3055, IX-138, PC-580)
- USS Mamo (YT-325)
- USS Manada (YT-224/YTB-224)
- USS Manasquan (AG-36/WAG-273)
- USS Manatee (SP-51, AO-58)
- USS Manayunk (1864, YN-100/AN-81)
- USS Manchester (1812, CL-83, LCS-14)
- USS Manchineel (YN-73/AN-54)
- USS Manchuria (ID-1633)
- USS Mandan (YTB-794)
- USS Manderson Victory (AK-230)
- USS Mandeville (SP-2563)
- USS Mango (YN-19/AN-24)
- USCGC Mangrove (WAGL-232)
- USS Manhasset (YAG-8/AG-47/WIX-276)
- USS Manhattan (1863, WYT-95, YTB-779)
- USS Manila (1883)
- USS Manila Bay (ACV-61/CVE-61/CVU-61)
- USS Manileno (1887, IX-141)
- USS Manistee (YT-173/YTB-173, YTB-782)
- USS Manito II (SP-262)
- USS Manitou (1863)
- USS Manitowoc (PG-169/PF-61, LST-1180)
- USS Mankato (YN-40/YNT-8/YTB-734/YTM-734)
- USS Manley (TB-23, DD-74/AG-28/APD-1, DD-940)
- USS Manlove (DE-36)
- USS Manna Hata (ID-3396)
- USS Manners (DE-523)
- USS Mannert L. Abele (DD-733)
- USS Manning (1898, DE-199)
- USS Manokin (AOG-60)
- USS Manomet (AG-37)
- USS Mansfield (DD-728)
- USS Manta (ID-2036, SS-299/AGSS-299)
- USS Manteo (YTM-751)
- USS Manuwai (YTB-16)
- USS Manville (PC-581)
- USCGC Manzanita (WAGL-223)
- USS Mapiro (SS-376)
- USS Maple (1893, YN-20)
- USS Maquinna (YT-225/YTB-225)
- USS Maquoketa (AOG-51/T-AOG-51)

== Mar ==
- USS Marabout (AMc-50)
- USS Maratanza (1861, IX-200)
- USS Marathon (APA-200, PGM-89/PG-89)
- USS Marblehead (1861, PG-27/C-11, CL-12)
- USS Marcasite (PY-28)
- USS Marcellus (1879)
- USS Marchand (DE-249)
- USS Marcia (1861, 1919)
- USS Marcus (DD-321)
- USS Marcus Island (CVE-77/CVHE-77/AKV-27)
- USS Marengo (AK-194)
- USS Marfa (PCE-842/PCE(R)-842)
- USS Margaret (SP-328, SP-524, SP-527, SP-531, ID-2510)
- USS Margaret and Jessie (1863)
- USS Margaret and Rebecca (1864)
- USS Margaret Anderson (SP-1203)
- USS Margaret Scott (1861)
- USS Margin (SP-2119)
- USS Margo (SP-870)
- USS Marguerite (SP-193)
- USS Marguerite II (SP-892)
- USS Maria (1864)
- USS Maria A. Wood (1861)
- USS Maria Denning (1858)
- USS Maria J. Carlton (1861)
- USS Maria Theresa (1861)
- USS Mariana (ID-3944)
- USS Mariano G. Vallejo (SSBN-658)
- USS Marias (AO-57/T-AO-57)
- USS Marica (ID-4031)
- USS Maricopa (AT-146/ATR-90/ATA-146, APA-245)
- USS Maricopa County (LST-938)
- USS Marie (SP-100, SP-1260)
- USS Marietta (1803, 1864, PG-15, YN-101/AN-82)
- USS Marigold (1863, WAGL-235)
- USS Marija (SP-413)
- USS Marin (YN-53/YNT-21, YTB-753)
- USNS Marie Tharp (T-AGS-66)
- USNS Marine Adder (T-AP-193)
- USNS Marine Carp (T-AP-199)
- USNS Marine Fiddler (T-AK-267)
- USNS Marine Jupiter (T-AP-200)
- USNS Marine Lynx (T-AP-194)
- USNS Marine Marlin (T-AP-201)
- USNS Marine Phoenix (T-AP-195)
- USNS Marine Serpent (T-AP-202)
- USS Mariner (SP-1136, 1906)
- USS Marinette (YTB-791, LCS-25)
- USS Marinette County (LST-953)
- USS Marion (1839)
- USS Marion County (LST-975)
- USS Mariveles (1898, IX-197)
- USS Marjorie M. (SP-1080)
- USS Mark (AG-143/AKL-12)
- USS Markab (AK-31/AD-21/AR-23)
- USS Marl (IX-160)
- USS Marlboro (APB-38)
- USS Marlin (SS-205, SST-2)
- USS Marmora (1862, IX-189)
- USS Marne (ID-3929)
- USS Marnell (PYc-39)
- USS Marold (SP-737)
- USS Marpessa (SP-787)
- USS Marquette (AKA-95)
- USS Mars (1798, AC-6, AR-16, AFS-1/T-AFS-1)
- USS Marsh (DE-699)
- USS Marshall (DD-676)
- USNS Marshfield (T-AK-282)
- USS Martha Washington (ID-3019)
- USS Martha's Vineyard (IX-97)
- USS Martin (1864, DE-30)
- USS Martin H. Ray (DE-338)
- USS Martinez (PCC-1244)
- USS Marts (DE-174)
- USS Marvel (AM-262/MSF-262)
- USS Marvin H. McIntyre (APA-129)
- USS Marvin Shields (DE-1066/FF-1066)
- USS Mary (SP-462)
- USS Mary Alice (SP-397)
- USS Mary and Betty (1861)
- USS Mary Ann (1864)
- USS Mary B. Garner (SP-682)
- USS Mary Frances (1861)
- USS Mary Linda (1864)
- USS Mary Louise (SP-356)
- USS Mary M (SP-3274)
- USS Mary Pope (SP-291)
- USS Mary Sanford (1862)
- USNS Mary Sears (T-AGS-65)
- USS Maryland (1799, ACR-8, BB-46, SSBN-738)
- USS Marysville (PCE(R)-857/EPCE(R)-857)

== Mas–Maz ==
- USS Masbate (ARG-15)
- USS Mascoma (AO-83/T-AO-83)
- USS Mascoutah (YTB-772/YTM-760)
- USS Mason (DD-191, DE-529, DDG-87)
- USS Mason L. Weems (IX-124)
- USS Massachusetts (1791, 1845, 1860, 1869, BB-2, ID-1255, BB-54, BB-59, SSN-798)
- USS Massasoit (1863, YT-15, YT-131/YTM-131)
- USS Massapequa (YTB-807)
- USS Massey (DD-778)
- USS Mastic (AN-46/YN-65)
- USS Mataco (AT-86/ATF-86)
- USS Matagorda (AVP-22/AG-122/WAVP-373/WHEC-373)
- USS Matanikau (CVE-101/CVU-101/AKV-36)
- USS Matanzas (AVP-46)
- USS Matar (AK-119)
- USS Matchless (1859)
- USS Mathews (AKA-96)
- USS Matinicus (AG-38/AK-52)
- USS Matsonia (ID-1589)
- USS Mattabesett (1864)
- USS Mattabesset (AOG-52)
- USS Mattaponi (AO-41/T-AO-41)
- USNS Matthew Perry (T-AKE-9)
- USS Matthew Vassar (1861)
- USS Mattole (AO-17)
- USS Matunak (YTB-548/YTM-548)
- USS Mauban (1900)
- USS Maud (SP-1009)
- USS Maui (ID-1514, ARG-8)
- USS Maumee (1864, AO-2/AG-124, T-AO-149/T-AOT-149, ID-1339)
- USS Mauna Kea (AE-22)
- USS Mauna Loa (SP-28, AE-8)
- USS Maurice J. Manuel (DE-351)
- USS Maurice River (LSM(R)-514)
- USS Maury (DD-100/DM-5, DD-401, AGS-16, T-AGS-39)
- USS Mauvila (YT-328/YTB-328/YTM-328)
- USS Mawkaw (YT-182/YTB-182/YTM-182)
- USS May (SP-164)
- USS Mayfield (PC-1196)
- USS Mayfield Victory (AK-232)
- USS Mayflower (1866, PY-1, 1897)
- USS Maynard (PC-780)
- USS Mayo (DD-422)
- USS Mayrant (DD-31, DD-402)
- USS Maysie (SP-930)
- USS Mazama (AE-9)
- USS Mazapeta (YT-181/YTB-181/YTM-181)

== Mc–Mem ==
- USS McAnn (DE-73, DE-179)
- USS McCaffery (DD-860/DDE-860)
- USS McCall (DD-28, DD-400)
- USS McCalla (DD-253, DD-488)
- USS McCampbell (DDG-85)
- USS McCandless (DE-1084/FF-1084/FFT-1084)
- USS McCawley (DD-276, AP-10/APA-4)
- USS McClelland (DE-750)
- USS McCloy (DE-1038/FF-1038)
- USS McClung (LSM-1)
- USS McClure (AVG-45/ACV-45)
- USS McClusky (FFG-41)
- USS McConnell (DE-163)
- USS McCook (DD-252, DD-496/DMS-36)
- USS McCord (DD-534)
- USS McCormick (DD-223/AG-118)
- USS McCoy Reynolds (DE-440)
- USS McCracken (APA-198)
- USS McCulloch (1897, WAVP-386/WHEC-386)
- USS McDermut (DD-262, DD-677)
- USS McDougal (DD-54, DD-358/AG-126)
- USS McDougall (SP-3717)
- USS McFarland (DD-237/AVD-14/APD-26)
- USS McFaul (DDG-74)
- USS McGinty (DE-365)
- USS McGowan (DD-678)
- USS McInerney (FFG-8)
- USS McKean (DD-90/APD-5, DD-784)
- USS McKee (TB-18, DD-87, DD-575, AS-41)
- USS McKeever Bros. (SP-683)
- USS McLanahan (DD-264, DD-615)
- USCGC McLane (WSC-146)
- USS McLennan (APA-246)
- USS McMinnville (PCS-1401)
- USS McMorris (DE-1036)
- USS McNair (DD-679)
- USS McNulty (DE-581)
- USS Me-Too (SP-155)
- USS Meade (DD-274, DD-602)
- USS Meadowlark (AMS-196/MSC-196)
- USS Measure (AM-263)
- USS Mechanic (1861)
- USS Mechanicsburg (PC-779)
- USS Mecklenburg (APA-247)
- USS Mecosta (YT-392/YTB-392/YTM-392, YTB-818)
- USS Medea (AKA-31)
- USS Medera (APA-244)
- USNS Medgar Evers (T-AKE-13)
- USS Media (AK-83)
- USS Mediator (1826)
- USS Medina (PC-1209)
- USS Medregal (SS-480/AGSS-480)
- USS Medrick (PCS-1464/AMc-203, AM-369, AMCU-31)
- USS Medusa (1869, AR-1)
- USS Meeker County (LST-980)
- USS Megara (ARV(A)-6/ARVA-6)
- USS Megrez (AK-126)
- USS Mellena (AKA-32)
- USS Mellette (APA-156)
- USS Melucta (AK-131)
- USS Melville (AD-2, T-AGOR-14)
- USS Melvin (DD-335, DD-680)
- USS Melvin R. Nawman (DE-416)
- USS Memorable (AMc-89)
- USS Memphis (1853, 1862, ACR-10/CA-10, CL-13, T-AO-162, SSN-691)

== Men–Mey ==
- USS Menard (APA-201)
- USS Menasha (YTB-773)
- USS Menatonon (YT-254/YTB-254)
- USS Mender (ARS(D)-2)
- USS Mendocino (APA-100)
- USNS Mendonca (T-AKR-303)
- USS Mendota (1863, YT-33)
- USS Menelaus (ARL-13)
- USS Menemsha (AG-39/WAG-274)
- USS Menewa (YN-34/YNT-2)
- USS Menges (DE-320)
- USS Menhaden (SP-847, SS-377)
- USS Menifee (APA-202)
- USS Menkar (AK-123)
- USS Menominee (AT-73/ATF-73, YTB-790, YT-807)
- USS Menoquet (YT-256/YTB-256)
- USS Mentor (PYc-37)
- USS Merak (1918, AF-21)
- USS Merapi (AF-38)
- USS Merauke (ID-2498)
- USS Mercedes (YT-108)
- USS Mercedita (1861)
- USS Mercer (ID-3837, APB-39/IX-502)
- USS Merchant (SP-2313)
- USS Mercurius (ID-2516)
- USS Mercury (1776, 1781, 1807, ID-3012, AK-42/AKS-20, T-AGM-21, T-AKR-10)
- USS Mercy (ID-1305/AH-4, APH-2, AH-8, T-AH-19)
- USS Merdick (AM-369)
- USS Meredith (DD-165, DD-434, DD-726, DD-890)
- USS Meredosia (1865, IX-193)
- USS Merganser (AM-135, AM-405, AMS-26/AMCU-47/MHC-47)
- USS Merit (AMc-90)
- USS Merito (SP-279)
- USS Meriwether (APA-203)
- MV Merlin (AK-323)
- USS Mero (SS-378)
- USS Merrick (AKA-97/LKA-97)
- USS Merrill (DE-392, DD-976)
- USS Merrimac (1864, 1898)
- USS Merrimack (1798, 1855, AO-37, AO-179)
- USS Mertz (DD-691)
- USS Mervine (DD-322, DD-489/DMS-31)
- USS Mesa Verde (LPD-19)
- USS Messenger (1861)
- USS Metacom (YN-51/YNT-19/YTM-740, YTB-829)
- USS Metacomet (1854, 1863)
- USS Metcalf (DD-595)
- USS Metea (YN-41/YNT-9)
- USS Meteor (1861, 1863, T-AKR-9)
- USS Metha Nelson (IX-74)
- USS Method (AM-264/MSF-264)
- USS Metinic (YFB-49)
- USS Metivier (DE-582)
- USS Metomkin (AVP-47, AG-136/AKL-7)
- USS Metropolis (PCC-589)
- USS Mettawee (AOG-17)
- USS Metuchen (PC-781)
- USS Mexican (ID-1655)
- USS Meyer (DD-279)
- USS Meyerkord (DE-1058/FF-1058)

== Mia–Min ==
- USS Miami (1861, CL-89, SSN-755, SSN-811)
- USS Miantonomah (CMc-5/CM-10, ACM-13/MMA-13)
- USS Miantonomoh (1863, BM-5)
- USS Michael G. Mullen (DDG-144)
- USS Michael Monsoor (DDG-1001)
- USS Michael Murphy (DDG-112)
- USNS Michelson (T-AGS-23)
- USS Michigame (AOG-65)
- USS Michigan (1843, BB-27, SSBN-727/SSGN-727)
- USS Micka (DE-176)
- USS Midas (ARB-5)
- USS Middlesex (1912)
- USS Middlesex County (LST-983)
- USS Midge (1822)
- USS Midland (AK-195)
- USS Midnight (1861, IX-149)
- USS Midnight Sun (YP-96)
- USS Midway (AG-41, ACV-63/CVE-63, CVB-41)
- USS Mifflin (APA-207)
- USS Migadan (YTB-549/YTM-549)
- USS Might (PG-94)
- USS Mignonette (1861)
- USS Migrant (IX-66)
- USNS Miguel Keith (T-ESB-5)
- USS Mikanopy (YT-329)
- USS Mikawe (SP-309)
- USS Milan (YP-6)
- USNS Milford (T-AG-187)
- USS Milius (DDG-69)
- USS Millard County (LST-987)
- USS Milledgeville (PG-206/PF-98, PG-202/PF-94, PC-1263)
- USS Miller (DD-535, DE-1091/FF-1091)
- USS Millicoma (AO-73/T-AO-73/T-AOT-73)
- USNS Millinocket (T-JHSV-3/T-EPF-3)
- USS Mills (DE-383/DER-383)
- USS Milton Lewis (DE-772)
- USS Milwaukee (1864, C-21, CL-5, AOR-2, LCS-5)
- USS Mimac (YTB-507)
- USS Mimosa (YN-21/AN-26)
- USS Minah (AMc-204/AMCU-14/MHC-14, AM-370)
- USS Mindanao (1898, PG-48/PR-8, ARG-3)
- USS Minden (PC-1176)
- USS Mindoro (1899, YAG-15, CVE-120/AKV-20)
- USS Mineral County (LST-988)
- USS Minerva (1869, SP-425, ARL-47)
- USS Mingo (1862, SS-261)
- USS Mingoe (1863)
- USS Minidoka (AK-196)
- USS Minivet (AM-371, AMCU-32/MHC-32)
- USS Mink (IX-123)
- USS Minneapolis (C-13/CA-17, CA-36)
- USS Minneapolis-Saint Paul (SSN-708, LCS-21)
- USS Minnehaha (YT-271/YTM-271)
- USS Minnemac II (SP-202)
- USS Minneopa (SP-1701)
- USS Minnesota (1855, BB-22, SSN-783)
- USS Minnesotan (ID-4545)
- USS Minnetonka (1867, 1869)
- USS Minniska (YT-408/YTB-408/YTM-408)
- USS Minooka (YT-257/YTB-257)
- USS Minorca (1892)
- USS Minos (ARL-14)
- USS Minotaur (ARL-15)
- USS Mintaka (AK-94)

== Mir–Miz ==
- USS Mira (SP-118, AK-84)
- USS Miramar (SP-591, SP-672)
- USNS Mirfak (T-AK-271)
- USS Mirna (SP-1214)
- USS Mirth (AM-265/MSF-265)
- USS Mishawaka (YTB-764)
- USS Mispillion (AO-105/T-AO-105)
- USS Miss Anne II (SP-657)
- USS Miss Betsy (SP-151)
- USS Miss Toledo (SP-1711)
- USS Mission Bay (AVG-59/ACV-59/CVE-59/CVU-59)
- USS Mission Buenaventura (AO-111/T-AO-111, T-AOT-1012)
- USS Mission Capistrano (AO-112/T-AO-112/T-AG-162, T-AOT-5005)
- USS Mission Carmel (AO-113/T-AO-113)
- USNS Mission De Pala (AO-114/T-AO-114)
- USS Mission Dolores (AO-115/T-AO-115)
- USS Mission Loreto (AO-116/T-AO-116)
- USS Mission Los Angeles (AO-117/T-AO-117)
- USS Mission Purisima (AO-118/T-AO-118)
- USS Mission San Antonio (AO-119/T-AO-119)
- USS Mission San Carlos (AO-120/T-AO-120)
- USS Mission San Diego (AO-121/T-AO-121)
- USS Mission San Fernando (AO-122/T-AO-122)
- USS Mission San Francisco (AO-123/T-AO-123)
- USS Mission San Gabriel (AO-124/T-AO-124)
- USS Mission San Jose (AO-125/T-AO-125)
- USS Mission San Juan (AO-126/T-AO-126)
- USS Mission San Luis Obispo (AO-127/T-AO-127)
- USS Mission San Luis Rey (AO-128/T-AO-128)
- USS Mission San Miguel (AO-129/T-AO-129)
- USS Mission San Rafael (AO-130/T-AO-130)
- USS Mission Santa Ana (AO-137/T-AO-137)
- USS Mission Santa Barbara (AO-131/T-AO-131)
- USS Mission Santa Clara (AO-132/T-AO-132)
- USS Mission Santa Cruz (AO-133/T-AO-133)
- USS Mission Santa Ynez (AO-134/T-AO-134/T-AOT-134)
- USS Mission Solano (AO-135/T-AO-135)
- USS Mission Soledad (AO-136/T-AO-136)
- USS Mississinewa (AO-59, AO-144/T-AO-144)
- USS Mississippi (1841, BB-23, BB-41/AG-128, DLGN-40/CGN-40, SSN-782)
- USS Missoula (ACR-13/CA-13, APA-211)
- USS Missouri (1841, 1863, BB-11, BB-63, SSN-780)
- USS Mist (1864, SP-567)
- USS Mistletoe (1861, 1872, WAGL-237)
- USS Mitchell (DE-43)
- USS Mitscher (DD-927/DL-2/DDG-35, DDG-57)
- USS Mizar (AF-12, YTM-759, T-AGOR-11/T-AK-272)
- USS Mizpah (PY-29)

== Moa–Mon ==
- USS Moale (DD-693)
- USS Moana Wave (AGOR-22)
- USS Moanahonga (YTB-258)
- USS Moberly (PF-63)
- USS Mobile (1853, ID-4030, CL-63, AKA-115/LKA-115, LCS-26)
- USS Mobile Bay (CG-53)
- USS Mobjack (AVP-27/AGP-7)
- USS Moccasin (1864, SS-5, ID-1322)
- USS Mockingbird (AMc-28, AMS-27/MSC(O)-27)
- USS Moctobi (AT-105/ATF-105)
- USS Modoc (1865, YT-16, WPG-46, WATA-194/WMEC-194)
- USS Moffett (DD-362)
- USS Mohave (AT-15)
- USS Mohawk (1814, 1853, YT-17, 1904, WPG-78, T-ATF-170)
- USS Mohican (1859, 1883, SP-117)
- USS Mohongo (1864)
- USS Moinester (DE-1097/FF-1097/FFT-1097)
- USS Moko Holo Hele (YFB-87)
- USS Molala (AT-106/ATF-106)
- USS Moldegaard (ID-4321)
- USS Momo (SP-49)
- USS Momsen (DDG-92)
- USS Mona II (1918)
- USS Mona Island (ARG-9)
- USS Monadnock (1864, BM-3, CMc-4/CM-9/ACM-10, ACM-14/MMA-14)
- USS Monaghan (DD-32, DD-354)
- USS Monarch (1862)
- USS Mondamin (1864)
- USS Mongolia (ID-1615)
- USS Monhegan (YFB-18)
- USS Monitor (1862, AN-1/AP-160/LSV-5/MCS-5)
- USS Monmouth County (LST-1032)
- USS Monob One (YAG-61)
- USS Monocacy (1864, SP-1116, PG-20/PR-2)
- USS Monomoy (AG-40/WAG-275/WPC-275)
- USS Monongahela (1862, AO-42/T-AO-42, AO-178)
- USS Monroe County (LST-1038)
- USS Monrovia (AP-64/APA-31)
- USS Monsoon (PC-4/WPC-4)
- USS Monssen (DD-436, DD-798)
- USS Montague (AKA-98)
- USS Montana (ACR-13, BB-51, BB-67, SSN-794)
- USS Montanan (1913)
- USS Montauk (1862, SP-392, SP-1213, AN-2/AP-161/LSV-6)
- USS Montcalm (AT-39/ATO-39)
- USS Montclair (ID-3497)
- USS Monterey (1863, BM-6, CV-26/CVL-26/AVT-2, CG-61)
- USS Montezuma (1798, 1861, YT-145/YTB-145/YTM-145)
- USNS Montford Point (T-MLP-1)
- USS Montgomery (1776, 1813, 1861, C-9, DD-121/DM-17, LCS-8)
- USS Montgomery County (LST-1041)
- USS Monticello (1859, AP-61, LSD-35)
- USS Montoso (1911)
- USS Montour (APA-101)
- USS Montpelier (1917, CL-57, SSN-765)
- USS Montrose (APA-212/LPA-212)

== Moo–Mou ==
- USS Moodna (1862)
- USS Moody (DD-277)
- USS Moonstone (PYc-9)
- USS Moore (DE-240)
- USS Moorsom (DE-522)
- USS Moosbrugger (DD-980)
- USS Moose (1863, IX-124)
- USS Moosehead (ID-2047, YW-56/IX-98)
- USS Moratoc (YTB-704/YTM-704)
- USS Moray (SS-300/AGSS-300)
- USS Moreno (AT-87/ATF-87)
- USS Morgan County (LST-1048/T-LST-1048)
- USS Morning Light (1853)
- USRC Morrill (1889)
- USS Morris (1778, 1779, 1846a, 1846b, TB-14, DD-271, DD-417, PC-1179)
- USS Morrison (DD-560)
- USS Morristown (ID-3580)
- USS Morse (1861)
- USS Morton (DD-948)
- USS Mosholu (1867)
- USS Mosley (DE-321)
- USS Mosopelea (AT-158/ATF-158)
- USS Mosquito (1775, 1822)
- USS Mosser Bay (CVE-114)
- USS Motive (AM-102/MSF-102)
- USS Mound City (1862)
- USS Mounsey (DE-524)
- USS Mount Baker (AE-4, AE-34/T-AE-34)
- USS Mount Hood (AE-11, AE-29)
- USS Mount Katmai (AE-16)
- USS Mount McKinley (AGC-7/LCC-7)
- USS Mount Olympus (AGC-8)
- USS Mount Shasta (ID-1822)
- USS Mount Vernon (1859, ID-4508, AP-22, LSD-39, T-AOT-3009)
- USS Mount Washington (1846, T-AOT-5076)
- USS Mount Whitney (LCC-20)
- USS Mountrail (APA-213/LPA-213)

== Mu–My ==
- USS Mugford (DD-105, DD-389)
- USS Muir (DE-770)
- USS Muir Woods (AO-139/T-AO-139)
- USS Mulberry (YN-22/AN-27)
- USS Muliphen (AKA-61/LKA-61)
- USS Mullany (DD-325, DD-528, DD-640)
- USS Mullinnix (DD-944)
- USS Munaires (ID-2197)
- USS Munalbro (1916)
- USS Munargo (AP-20)
- USS Munda (CVE-104/CVU-104)
- USS Mundelta (ID-1301)
- USS Munindies (ID-2093)
- USS Munising (PC-1228)
- USS Munplace (ID-2346)
- USS Munrio (ID-2054)
- USS Munsee (AT-107/ATF-107)
- USS Munsomo (ID-1607)
- USS Munwood (ID-4460)
- USS Murphy (DD-603)
- USS Murray (SP-1438, DD-97/DM-2, DD-576/DDE-576)
- USS Murrelet (AM-372/MSF-372)
- USS Murzim (AK-95)
- USS Musadora (1864)
- USS Muscatine (ID-2226, AK-197)
- USNS Muscle Shoals (T-AGM-19)
- USNS Muscogee Creek Nation (T-ATS-10)
- USS Muscotah (YT-33)
- USS Muscoota (1864)
- USS Music (SP-1288)
- USS Muskallunge (SS-262)
- USS Muskeget (YAG-9/AG-48/WAG-48)
- USS Muskegon (PG-132/PF-24, YTB-763)
- USS Muskingum (AK-198/T-AK-198)
- USS Muskogee (PG-157/PF-49)
- USS Mustang (SP-36, IX-155)
- USS Mustin (DD-413, DDG-89)
- USS Myers (DE-595/APD-105)
- USS Myles C. Fox (DD-829/DDR-829, DE-546)
- USS Myrmidon (ARL-16)
- USS Myrtle (1862, 1872, SP-3289, WAGL-263)
- USS Mystery (SP-428, SP-2744, SP-16)
- USS Mystic (1853, DSRV-1)

== Primary ==
- Dictionary of American Naval Fighting Ships, M
- Naval Vessel Register, M

== Secondary ==
- navy.mil: List of homeports and their ships
- NavSource Naval History
