= Merito =

Merito may refer to:

People

- Merito Acosta (1896–1963), a Cuban-born professional baseball player in the United States
- Gerry Merito (1938–2009), a New Zealand singer and guitarist

Places

- Merítő, the Hungarian name for Mereteu village, Vințu de Jos Commune, Alba County, Romania

Ships

- USS Merito (SP-279), a United States Navy patrol vessel in commission in 1917
