= Minneopa =

Minneopa may refer to:

- Minneopa State Park, a state park in Minnesota in the United States
- USS Minneopa (SP-1701), a United States Navy patrol boat in service from 1917 to 1918
