= USS Mockingbird =

USS Mockingbird may refer to the following ships of the United States Navy:

- USS Mockingbird (AMc-28), was a wooden dragger purchased by the US Navy in October 1940 and placed out of service February 1944
- USS Mockingbird (AMS-27), was launched as YMS‑419 in March 1944 and transferred to the Republic of Korea January 1956
