= USS Mystery =

USS Mystery has been the name of more than one proposed or actual United States Navy vessel, and may refer to:

- USS Mystery (SP-16) the proposed naval designation for the private motorboat Mystery, which was inspected for naval service in 1917 but never acquired or commissioned
- USS Mystery (SP-428), a patrol boat in commission from 1917 to 1919
- USS Mystery (ID-2744), sometimes reported as SP-2744, a support ship for minesweepers in commission from 1918 to 1919
