= USS Manistee =

Two ships of the United States Navy have been named USS Manistee for Manistee, Michigan - a Native American word meaning island in the river.

- USS Manistee (YT-173), a district harbor tug that served during World War II
- USS Manistee (YTB-782), a large district harbor tug in active service
