= USS Mistletoe =

There have been three ships named USS Mistletoe:

- USS Mistletoe (1861)—a tug boat that served during the American Civil War
- USS Mistletoe (1872)—a wooden tender that served as a patrol boat during World War I
- USS Mistletoe (WAGL-237)—a buoy tender built in 1939 that served with the U.S. Coast Guard and later with the U.S. Navy during World War II.
