= USS Mist =

USS Mist has been the name of more than one United States Navy ship, and may refer to:

- USS Mist (1864), a steamer in commission from March to August 1865
- USS Mist (SP-567), a patrol vessel in commission from 1917 to 1919
- USS YP-422, a patrol vessel in commission from 1942 to 1943, started life as the fishing trawler Mist, though it did not bear that name as a naval vessel
