= USS Muskegon =

USS Muskegon may refer to the following ships operated by the United States Navy:

- USS Muskegon (PF-24), was a patrol frigate launched in July 1943 and scrapped in the late 1950s exact date unknown
- Muskegon (YTB-763), is a large harbor tug launched in 1962 and currently in active service
