= USS Manatee =

USS Manatee has been the name of two United States Navy vessels and may refer to either one of the following:

- USS Manatee (SP-51), a speedboat that served as a patrol boat during World War I.
- USS Manatee (AO-58), a replenishment oiler in commission from 1944 to 1973.
