= USS Marguerite II =

Patrol vessel of the United States Navy

History

United States
- Name: USS Marguerite II (1917-1918); USS SP-982 (1918-1919)
- Namesake: Marguerite II was a previous name retained; SP-982 was her section patrol number
- Completed: 1917
- Acquired: 1917
- Commissioned: 1917
- Renamed: SP-982 in 1918
- Fate: Disposed of in 1919

General characteristics
- Type: Patrol vessel

USS Marguerite II (SP-892) was a United States Navy patrol vessel in commission from 1917 and 1919.

Marguerite II was built as a private motorboat in 1917. In 1917, the U.S. Navy acquired her for use as a section patrol boat during World War I. She was commissioned as USS Marguerite II (SP-892) sometime in 1917. Sometime in 1918 she was renamed USS SP-892, presumably to avoid confusion with another patrol boat. USS Marguerite (SP-193), in commission at the same time.

The Navy disposed of SP-892 sometime in 1919 via an unknown means.

No other records of Marguerite II's operational history are available, nor are any records of her characteristics.
