= USS Miantonomoh =

USS Miantonomoh may refer to the following ships of the United States Navy:

- USS Miantonomoh (1863), was a monitor launched in 1863 and broken up in 1875
- USS Miantonomoh (BM-5), was a monitor launched in 1876 and decommissioned in 1907
