= Mira (SP-118) =

Patrol vessel of the United States Navy

History

United States
- Name: USS Mira (proposed)
- Namesake: Mira, a star in the constellation Cetus (The Whale) (previous name retained)
- Builder: Holmes Motor Company, West Mystic, Connecticut
- Completed: 1911
- Commissioned: Never
- Fate: Returned to owner 8 May 1918
- Notes: Saw no active U.S. Navy service

General characteristics
- Type: Patrol vessel (proposed)

The first proposed USS Mira (SP-118) was a launch scheduled for United States Navy use as a patrol vessel in 1918 that was never commissioned.

Mira was built as a wooden-hulled civilian motor launch in 1911 by the Holmes Motor Company at West Mystic, Connecticut. The U.S. Navy acquired Mira from her owner, Charles L. Poor, and scheduled her for use as a patrol boat in the 3rd Naval District during World War I. However, she saw no active naval service, and the Navy returned her to Poor on 8 May 1918 without ever commissioning her.
