= USS Montpelier =

USS Montpelier may refer to:

- USS Montpelier (ID-1954), a German freighter initially named SS Bochum seized in 1917 during World War I
- USS Montpelier (CL-57), a Cleveland-class light cruiser in commission from 1942–1947
- USS Montpelier (SSN-765), an active-duty Los Angeles-class submarine commissioned in 1993
