= USS Merrill =

USS Merrill may refer to the following ships of the United States Navy:

- USS Merrill (DE-392), a destroyer escort that served during World War II as a ship of the U.S. Coast Guard
- USS Merrill (DD-976), a Spruance-class destroyer that served from 1978 to 1998
