= USS Miantonomah =

USS Miantonomah may refer to the following ships of the United States Navy:

- USS Miantonomah (CMc-5), a cargo ship, was commissioned in 1941 and sunk by enemy action in September 1944
- USS Miantonomah (ACM-13), an auxiliary minelayer, was commissioned in 1950 and decommissioned in 1955
