= USS LST-953 =

1944 LST-542-class tank landing ship

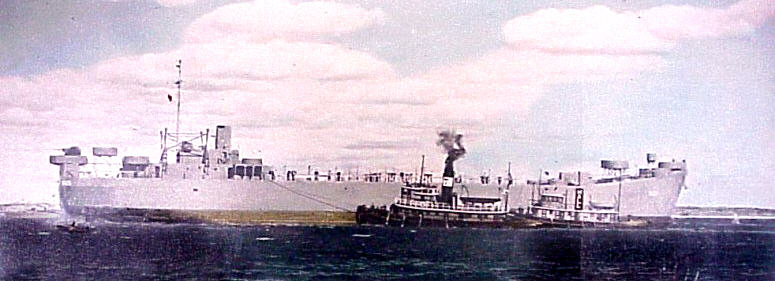
- LST-953 soon after launching at Bethlehem-Hingham Shipyard, Inc., 15 October 1944

History

United States
- Name: LST-953
- Builder: Bethlehem-Hingham Shipyard, Hingham, Massachusetts
- Yard number: 3423
- Laid down: 15 September 1944
- Launched: 15 October 1944
- Commissioned: 7 November 1944
- Decommissioned: 12 November 1946
- Fate: laid up, 17 June 1950, Atlantic Reserve Fleet, Green Cove Spring, Florida
- Renamed: Marinette County
- Namesake: Marinette County, Wisconsin
- Stricken: 1 November 1958
- Identification: Hull symbol: LST-953; Code letters: NKFB
- Honors and awards: 1 × battle star
- Fate: Unknown

General characteristics
- Class & type: LST-542-class tank landing ship
- Displacement: 1,625 long tons (1,651 t) (light); 4,080 long tons (4,145 t) (full (seagoing draft with 1,675 short tons (1,520 t) load); 2,366 long tons (2,404 t) (beaching)
- Length: 328 ft (100 m) oa
- Beam: 50 ft (15 m)
- Draft: Unloaded: 2 ft 4 in (0.71 m) forward; 7 ft 6 in (2.29 m) aft; Full load: 8 ft 3 in (2.51 m) forward; 14 ft 1 in (4.29 m) aft; Landing with 500 short tons (450 t) load: 3 ft 11 in (1.19 m) forward; 9 ft 10 in (3.00 m) aft; Limiting 11 ft 2 in (3.40 m); Maximum navigation 14 ft 1 in (4.29 m)
- Installed power: 2 × 900 hp (670 kW) Electro-Motive Diesel 12-567A diesel engines; 1,800 shp (1,300 kW)
- Propulsion: 1 × Falk main reduction gears; 2 × Propellers
- Speed: 11.6 kn (21.5 km/h; 13.3 mph)
- Range: 24,000 nmi (44,000 km; 28,000 mi) at 9 kn (17 km/h; 10 mph) while displacing 3,960 long tons (4,024 t)
- Boats & landing craft carried: 2 x LCVPs
- Capacity: 1,600–1,900 short tons (3,200,000–3,800,000 lb; 1,500,000–1,700,000 kg) cargo depending on mission
- Troops: 16 officers, 147 enlisted men
- Complement: 13 officers, 104 enlisted men
- Armament: Varied, ultimate armament; 2 × twin 40 mm (1.57 in) Bofors guns; 4 × single 40 mm Bofors guns; 12 × 20 mm (0.79 in) Oerlikon cannons

Service record
- Part of: LST Flotilla 21
- Operations: Assault and occupation of Okinawa Gunto (26–30 June 1945)
- Awards: American Campaign Medal; Asiatic–Pacific Campaign Medal; World War II Victory Medal; Navy Occupation Service Medal w/Asia Clasp

USS Marinette County (LST-953) was an LST-542-class tank landing ship built for the United States Navy during World War II. Like many of her class, she was not named and is properly referred to by her hull designation. She was later named after Marinette County, Wisconsin, she was the only US Naval vessel to bear the name.

== Construction ==
LST-953 was laid down on 15 September 1944, at Hingham, Massachusetts, by the Bethlehem-Hingham Shipyard; launched on 15 October 1944; and commissioned on 7 November 1944.

== Service history ==
During World War II, LST-953 was assigned to the Asiatic-Pacific theater. LST-953 commenced an east coast shakedown on 12 November 1944, and hastened to join LST Flotilla 21, which was already at Pearl Harbor. Three months of intensive training exercises preceded LST-953's April 1945, voyage to Guam. After a series of supply missions in the southern Marianas, she arrived at Okinawa in the War Zone on 26 June. For five weeks Marine Corps troops and vehicles were shuttled around the island to facilitate mop-up operations.

== Post-war activities ==
The day Japan announced acceptance of surrender terms, LST-953 returned to the Marianas. LST-953 carried elements of the 2nd Marine Division to Nagasaki on 24 September, for the occupation of Japan and men of the US Army's 24th Infantry Division to Matsuyama on 27 October. A "Magic Carpet" voyage back to San Diego concluded its duty in the Pacific.

=== Decommissioning ===
In July 1946, she transited the Panama Canal and steamed to Beaumont, Texas. Decommissioned on 12 November 1946, the ship served in the Naval Reserve Program until towed to Green Cove Springs, Florida, on 17 June 1950, for berthing in the Atlantic Reserve Fleet. She was renamed Marinette County on 1 July 1955. On 1 November 1958, her name was struck from the Naval Vessel Register.

== Awards ==
LST-953 earned one battle star for World War II service.

== Bibliography ==
Online resources

- "LST-953". Dictionary of American Naval Fighting Ships. Naval History and Heritage Command. This article incorporates text from this source, which is in the public domain.
- "Maricopa County". Dictionary of American Naval Fighting Ships. Naval History and Heritage Command. 5 August 2015. This article incorporates text from this source, which is in the public domain.
- "Bethlehem-Hingham, Hingham MA". ShipbuildingHistory.com. 11 August 2011.
- "USS LST-953". NavSource. 27 May 2016.
