= USS Martin =

USS Martin may refer to the following ships of the United States Navy:

- USS Martin (1864), a screw tug purchased by the US Navy on 16 June 1864 and decommissioned in June 1865
- USS Martin (DE-30), an Evarts-class destroyer escort launched on 18 May 1943 and sold for scrapping on 15 May 1946

== See also ==
- USS Martin H. Ray, an Edsall-class destroyer escort
