= USS Marigold =

Tugboat of the United States Navy

History

United States
- Laid down: date unknown
- Launched: 1863
- Acquired: 13 June 1863
- Commissioned: 13 June 1863
- Decommissioned: 1865
- Stricken: 1866 (est.)
- Fate: Sold, 6 October 1866

General characteristics
- Displacement: 115 tons
- Length: 84 ft 7 in (25.78 m)
- Beam: 18 ft 9 in (5.72 m)
- Draught: 7 ft (2.1 m)
- Propulsion: steam engine; screw-propelled
- Speed: not known
- Complement: 17
- Armament: one 12-pounder heavy gun; one 12-pounder rifle

USS Marigold was a steamer acquired by the Union Navy during the American Civil War. She was used by the Union Navy as a tugboat, dispatch boat and also as a gunboat in the blockade of the Confederacy.

Marigold, a screw tug built at Philadelphia, Pennsylvania, was purchased by the Navy at Philadelphia 13 June 1863 and commissioned there the same day.

== Assigned to the East Gulf Blockade ==
Assigned to the East Gulf Blockading Squadron she served as a tug, dispatch boat, and blockader through the end of the Civil War. On 6 October Marigold shared in the capture of blockade runner, Last Trial, which was attempting to slip through the Union cordon of warships with salt for the South.

== Capturing blockade runners in Southern waters ==
On 9 April 1864 while bringing mail from Key West, Florida, to Havana, Cuba, she fired on English merchantman Belle, coming from Matamoros, Mexico; but the British ship reached safety in the neutral port. On 25 February 1865, the steam tug captured British schooner Salvadora in the Straits of Florida heading for the Confederate coast with an assorted cargo.

== Post-war operations, decommissioning and civilian career ==
After the Confederacy collapsed, Marigold continued to serve in Key West Harbor through the summer. She was sold at public auction at New York City 6 October 1866, and redocumented as William A. Hennessey on 30 December 1868. The tug caught fire and was destroyed at New York City on 30 November 1875.
