= USS Magpie =

USS Magpie may refer to one of the following ships of the United States Navy:

- USS Magpie (AMc-2), built as City of San Pedro in 1936 by Harbor Boat Building Co., Terminal Island, California
- USS Magpie (AM-418), construction was canceled 11 August 1945
- USS Magpie (AMS-25), laid down as YMS-400 by Henry B. Nevins, Inc., City Island, New York
- USS Magpie (AMCU-29), the former LCI(L)-944; renamed and reclassified 7 March 1952; scrapped after a brief period of operations near the Panama Canal
