= USS Magistrate =

Patrol vessel of the United States Navy

History

United States
- Laid down: date unknown
- Launched: 1916
- Acquired: 1 May 1917
- Commissioned: 24 May 1917
- Out of service: c. 1919
- Stricken: c. 1919
- Fate: Returned to her owner 15 February 1919

General characteristics
- Tonnage: 44 tons (gr.)
- Length: 63 ft (19 m)
- Beam: 15 ft 8 in (4.78 m)
- Draught: 4 ft 2 in (1.27 m)
- Speed: 10.0 knots
- Complement: 14
- Armament: one 1-pounder., 1 machine gun

USS Magistrate (SP-143) was a Magistrate-class patrol boat acquired by the U.S. Navy for the task of patrolling the coasts and harbors of the United States.

Magistrate, a wooden hull gas powered boat, was built by Herreshoff Manufacturing Co., Bristol, Rhode Island, in 1916; acquired by the Navy under free lease from Henry S. Vanderbilt of New York City, 1 May 1917; delivered 14 May 1917; and commissioned 24 May 1917.

== World War I service ==
Assigned to the 2d Naval District, Magistrate patrolled waters at the eastern end of Long Island Sound while operating out of New London, Connecticut.

== Post-war deactivation ==
Following the end of World War I, she was returned to her owner 15 February 1919.
