= Monadnock (ACM-14) =

Mine planter for the U.S. Army Coast Artillery Corps

History

United States
- Name: USAMP Major Samuel Ringgold (MP 11) for U.S. Army, ACM-14, Monadnock
- Builder: Marietta Manufacturing Co., Point Pleasant, West Virginia for U.S. Army
- Launched: 6 October 1942
- Acquired: by the US Navy, March 1951
- Renamed: Monadnock, 1 May 1955
- Reclassified: MMA-14, 7 February 1955
- Stricken: 1 July 1960
- Identification: IMO number: 8522494
- Fate: Sold commercial, lost 23 July 2004

General characteristics
- Class & type: ACM-11 class minelayer
- Displacement: 910 long tons (925 t) light
- Length: 189 ft (58 m)
- Beam: 37 ft (11 m)
- Draft: 12 ft (3.7 m)
- Speed: 12 knots (22 km/h; 14 mph)
- Complement: 125

Monadnock (ACM-14) was originally built as an M1 mine planter for the U.S. Army Coast Artillery Corps, Mine Planter Service as USAMP Major Samuel Ringgold (MP 11) by the Marietta Manufacturing Co., Point Pleasant, WV and delivered to the Army December 1942. The ship was the second mine planter named for Samuel Ringgold (1796–1846), an officer noted as the "Father of Modern Artillery" who fell in the Mexican–American War.

The mine planter was transferred to the U.S. Navy in March 1951 to become an Auxiliary Minelayer (ACM / MMA) under naval designation. She was then berthed at Boston as a unit of the Atlantic Reserve Fleet. While in the Reserve Fleet, she was redesignated MMA-14, 7 February 1955, and named Monadnock, 1 May 1955; the second ACM to bear this name. The ship was never commissioned and thus never bore the "USS" prefix. Monadnock was struck from the Navy Directory on 1 July 1960 and sold to commercial interests. In commercial service the ship was named Tahiti, Amazonia, Dear, Majestic and finally Maxims des Mers before being lost on 23 July 2004.
