= USS Mahanna =

American naval cargo ship

History

United States
- Laid down: date unknown
- Launched: 1919
- Acquired: 20 September 1920
- Commissioned: 29 September 1920
- Decommissioned: 15 September 1921
- Stricken: 2 December 1921
- Fate: Returned to the shipping board

General characteristics
- Displacement: 6,125 tons (lt.)
- Length: 286 ft (87 m)
- Beam: 45 ft (14 m)
- Draught: 23 ft 6 in (7.16 m)
- Speed: 11 knots
- Complement: 44
- Armament: none

USS Mahanna (AG-8) was a Mahanna-class cargo ship. She was acquired by the U.S. Navy as a miscellaneous auxiliary cargo vessel, to be used for transporting general stores to Navy units in the field.

Mahanna was a wooden steam freighter, which was built by McEachern & Co., Astoria, Oregon, in 1919. She was operated by the U.S. Shipping Board (USSB), transferred to the Navy at Norfolk, Virginia, on 20 September 1920, and then commissioned at Norfolk on 29 September 1920.

== Service with the Atlantic Fleet ==
Mahanna was assigned to the U.S. Atlantic Fleet. She sailed out of Norfolk for survey missions to the West Indies during the next year, cruising between the Caribbean and the U.S. East Coast ports with other survey ships.

== Decommissioning ==
She was decommissioned at Portsmouth, New Hampshire, on 15 September 1921. Mahanna was returned to the United States Shipping Board (USSB) on 2 December 1921 and struck from the Navy list.
