= USS Magnet (SP-563) =

Patrol vessel of the United States Navy

History

United States
- Name: USS Magnet
- Namesake: Previous name retained
- Builder: Electric Launch Company, Bayonne, New Jersey
- Completed: 1910
- Acquired: 11 June 1917
- Commissioned: 27 June 1917
- Fate: Sold 1920
- Notes: Operated as private motor yacht Magnet 1910-1917

General characteristics
- Type: Patrol vessel
- Tonnage: 52 or 76 gross register tons
- Length: 95 ft 3 in (29.03 m)
- Beam: 14 ft 10 in (4.52 m)
- Draft: 4 ft 3 in (1.30 m)
- Speed: 14 knots
- Complement: 22
- Armament: 1 × 1-pounder gun; 1 × machine gun; 1 × Y-gun

The first USS Magnet (SP-563) was a United States Navy patrol vessel in commission from 1917 to 1919.

Magnet was built as a private motor yacht of the same name by the Electric Launch Company at Bayonne, New Jersey, in 1910. On 11 June 1917, the U.S. Navy acquired her from her owner, H. F. Lippett, for use as a section patrol craft during World War I. She was commissioned as USS Magnet (SP-563) on 27 June 1917.

Magnet served on patrol duties for the rest of World War I. She was ordered sold on 1 October 1919 and was sold in 1920.
