= USS Miramar =

Patrol vessel of the United States Navy

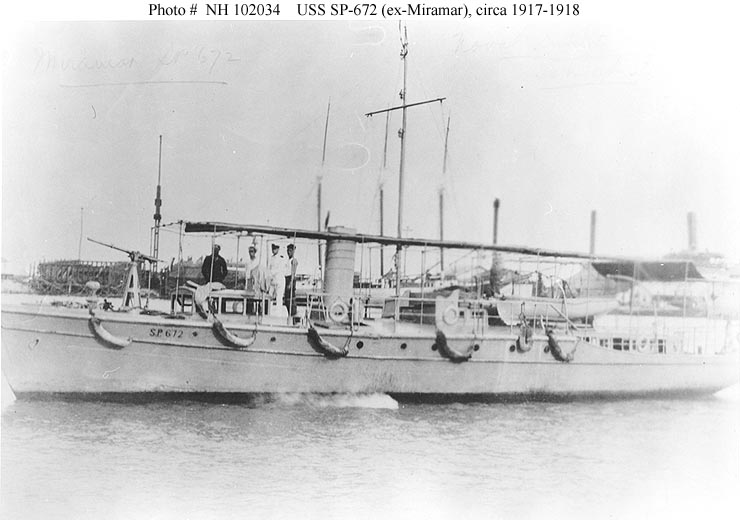
- USS SP-672, ex-USS Miramar (SP-672), sometime in 1918.

History

United States
- Name: USS Miramar (1917-1918); USS SP-672 (1918)
- Namesake: Miramar was her previous name retained; SP-672 was her section patrol number
- Completed: 1907
- Acquired: 18 August 1917
- Commissioned: 31 August 1917
- Renamed: SP-672 in 1918
- Fate: Returned to owner 30 December 1918
- Notes: Operated as private motorboat Lillian II and Miramar 1907-1917 and as Miramar from 1918

General characteristics
- Type: Patrol vessel
- Tonnage: 144 gross register tons
- Length: 76 ft (23 m) or 131 ft (40 m)
- Beam: 8 ft (2.4 m)
- Draft: 7 ft 5 in (2.26 m)
- Speed: 13.5 knots
- Complement: 22
- Armament: 1 × 3-pounder gun; 1 × machine gun

USS Miramar (SP-672), later USS SP-672, was a United States Navy patrol vessel in commission from 1917 to 1918.

Miramar was built as the private motorboat Lillian II at Long Island City, New York, in 1907. She later was renamed Miramar.

On 18 August 1917, the U.S. Navy acquired Miramar from her owner for use as a section patrol boat during World War I. She was commissioned as USS Miramar (SP-672) on 31 August 1917.

Assigned to the 8th Naval District, Miramar conducted patrols for the rest of World War I. During 1918, her name was changed to USS SP-672.

SP-672 was returned to her owner on 30 December 1918.
