= USS Mecosta =

USS Mecosta may refer to the following ships of the United States Navy:

- Mecosta (YTM-392) a Sassaba-class harbor tug laid down in 1944 and sold in 1981.
- Mecosta (YTB-818) a Natick-class Large District Harbor Tug
