= USS Marin =

USS Marin may refer to the following ships operated by the United States Navy:

- USS Marin (YNT-21), was purchased by the Navy 14 November 1940 and placed out of service 18 June 1946
- USS Marin (YTB-753), was a tugboat launched in April 1960 and struck in 1991
