= USS Menhaden =

Ship name

USS Menhaden has been the name of more than one United States Navy ship, and may refer to:

- USS Menhaden (SP-847), a patrol vessel and tug in commission from 1917 to 1919
- USS Menhaden (SS-377), a submarine in commission from 1945 to 1946, from 1951 to 1952, and from 1953 to 1971
