= USS Machias =

USS Machias has been the name of more than one United States Navy ship, and may refer to:

- USS Machias (PG-5), a gunboat in commission from 1893 to 1900, 1901 to 1904, and 1914 to 1919
- USS Machias (PF-53), a patrol frigate in commission from 1944 to 1945
- USS Machias (PF-72), a patrol frigate originally named USS Hallowell (PF-72) and transferred to the Royal Navy prior to completion as HMS Anguilla (K500)
