= USS Merak =

USS Merak may refer to the following ships of the United States Navy:

- USS Merak (1910), was built in 1910 at Rotterdam, the Netherlands and operated by an Austrian-controlled company. The vessel was seized and turned over to the US Navy in 1918 and was sunk, with no casualties, in the western Atlantic 6 August 1918 by gunfire from the German U-boat SM U-140.
- USS Merak (AF-21), was a cargo ship acquired by the US Navy on 20 March 1942 and decommissioned 21 June 1946
