= USS Mount Washington =

USS Mount Washington may refer to the following ships operated by the United States armed forces:

- USS Mount Washington (1846), a steamer purchased by the Union Navy during the American Civil War
- SS Mount Washington (T-AOT-5076), a transport oiler of the Ready Reserve Fleet of the United States Maritime Administration

== See also ==
- MS Mount Washington, a sightseeing vessel on Lake Winnipesaukee, New Hampshire, U.S.
