= USS Mary (SP-462) =

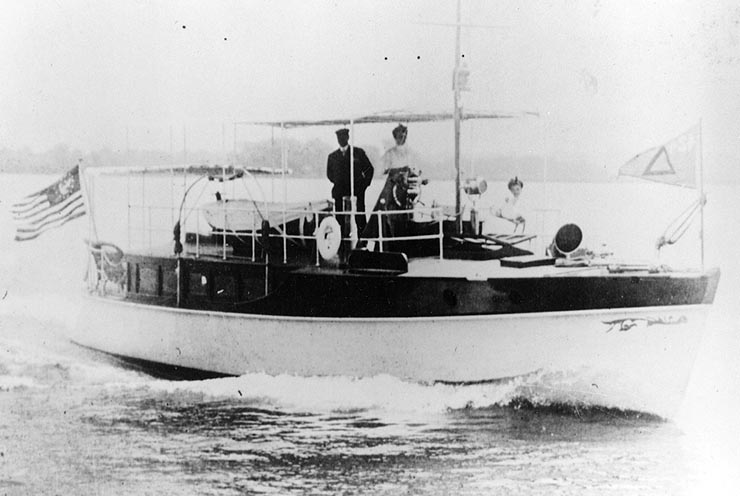
- Mary in private use ca. 1917.

History

United States
- Name: USS Mary (proposed)
- Namesake: Previous name retained (proposed)
- Builder: Charles L. Seabury Company, Morris Heights, the Bronx, New York
- Completed: 1907 or 1908
- Acquired: Scheduled for 12 January 1918, but not taken over
- Commissioned: Never
- Notes: No naval service; operated as private motorboat Mary

General characteristics
- Type: Patrol vessel (proposed)
- Tonnage: 22 gross register tons
- Length: 55 ft 6 in (16.92 m)
- Beam: 11 ft (3.4 m)
- Draft: 3 ft 9 in (1.14 m)
- Speed: 12 knots
- Armament: 1 × 1-pounder gun (proposed); 1 × machine gun (proposed)

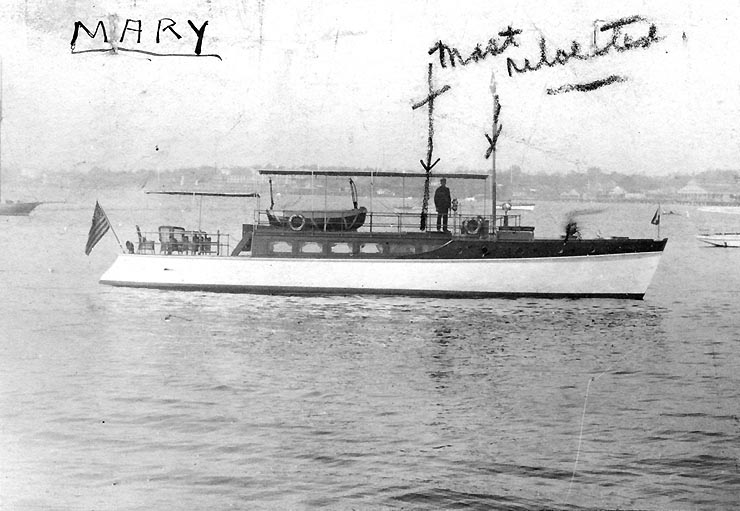
Mary in private use sometime between 1907 and 1917. The note written on the photograph describes a change in the location of her mast.

USS Mary (SP-462) was the proposed name and designation for a motorboat that the United States Navy considered for World War I naval service as a patrol vessel but never acquired.

Mary was built as the private motorboat Dida in 1907 or 1908 by the Charles L. Seabury Company at Morris Heights, the Bronx, New York. She later may have been renamed Boston, and eventually was renamed Mary.

Mary was the property of H. L. Jones when the U.S. Navy surveyed her in 1917 for possible naval use during World War I, stating that she was "strong and well built in good condition but not able to keep sea in heavy weather". The Navy assigned her the section patrol number SP-462 and scheduled her to be taken over from Jones on 12 January 1918. However, the Navy never took control of her, and she saw no naval service.
