= USS Montauk =

USS Montauk may refer to the following ships of the United States Navy:

- USS Montauk (1862), was a monitor, commissioned in 1862 and decommissioned in 1865
- USS Montauk (SP-392), was a minesweeper, purchased in 1917 and wrecked in 1918
- USS Montauk (SP-1213), was a tug, commissioned in 1917 and sold in 1920
- USS Montauk (LSV-6), was a transport commissioned in 1944 then renamed Galilea (AKN-6) in 1946 and decommissioned in 1947
