= USS Medusa =

USS Medusa may refer to the following ships operated by the United States Navy:

- USS Medusa (1869), was the single‑turreted monitor Nantucket renamed Medusa 15 June 1869 and reassigned her original name Nantucket 10 August 1869
- USS Medusa (AR-1), was a fleet repair ship launched 16 April 1923 and sold for scrapping 24 August 1950
