= USS Mustang (SP-36) =

Patrol vessel of the United States Navy

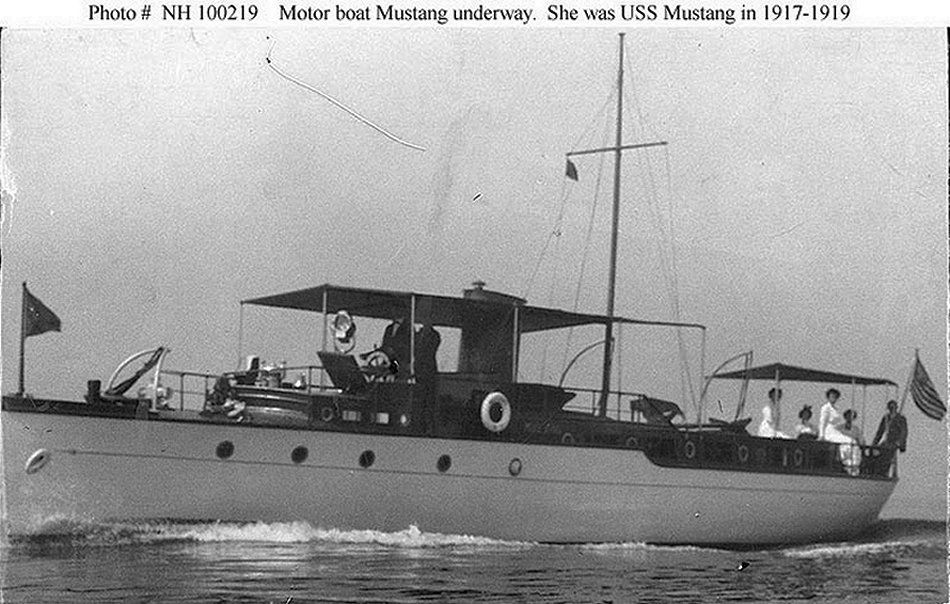
- Mustang as a private pleasure craft prior to her U.S. Navy service

History

United States
- Name: USS Mustang
- Namesake: Previous name retained
- Builder: National Boat and Electric Company, St. Joseph, Michigan
- Completed: 1911
- Acquired: 6 July 1917
- Commissioned: 2 October 1917
- Stricken: June 1919
- Fate: Sold 23 July 1919
- Notes: Operated as private yacht Mustang 1911-1917

General characteristics
- Type: Patrol vessel
- Tonnage: 37 Gross register tons
- Length: 65 ft (20 m)
- Beam: 12 ft 6 in (3.81 m)
- Draft: 7 ft (2.1 m)
- Propulsion: Gasoline engine
- Speed: 12 knots
- Complement: 9
- Armament: 1 × 1-pounder gun

The first USS Mustang (SP-36) was an armed yacht that served in the United States Navy as a patrol vessel from 1917 to 1919.

Mustang was a wooden-hulled, gasoline-powered yacht built in 1911 by National Boat and Electric Company at St. Joseph, Michigan. The U.S. Navy purchased Mustang from her owner, Henry S. Beardsley of New York City, on 6 July 1917 for World War I service. She was commissioned as USS Mustang (SP-36) on 2 October 1917.

Assigned to the 3rd Naval District, Mustang operated out of Section Base No. 7 at Whitestone on Long Island, New York, for the remainder of World War I. She patrolled the western reaches of Long Island Sound and the approaches to the East River.

At some point following the Armistice that ended the war on 11 November 1918, Mustang was decommissioned. Stricken from the Navy List in June 1919, she was sold to Allen N. Spooner & Son of New York City on 23 July 1919.
