= USS Momo =

Patrol vessel of the United States Navy

History

United States
- Name: USS Momo
- Namesake: Previous name retained
- Builder: New York Yacht, Launch, and Engine Company, Morris Heights, New York
- Acquired: 11 July 1917
- Commissioned: 17 September 1917
- Stricken: 11 February 1919
- Fate: Returned to owner 11 February 1919
- Notes: In private use as motorboat Elsie IV and Momo until 1917 and as Momo from 1919

General characteristics
- Type: Patrol vessel
- Tonnage: 16 tons
- Length: 57 ft (17 m)
- Beam: 8 ft 1 in (2.46 m)
- Draft: 2 ft 4 in (0.71 m)
- Speed: 15 knots
- Armament: 1 × 1-pounder gun

USS Momo (SP-49) was an armed motorboat that served as a United States Navy patrol vessel from 1917 to 1919.

Momo was built as the private motorboat Elsie IV by the New York Yacht, Launch, and Engine Company at Morris Heights, New York. By 1917 she had been renamed Momo. The U.S. Navy acquired her for World War I service on a free lease from her owner, C. H. Crane, on 11 July 1917, and commissioned her as patrol boat USS Momo (SP-49) on 17 September 1917.

Momo was assigned to patrol boat service in the section patrol off the United States East Coast, serving in this role through the end of World War I.

Momo was stricken from the Navy List and returned to Crane on 11 February 1919.
