= USS Minnemac II =

Patrol vessel of the United States Navy

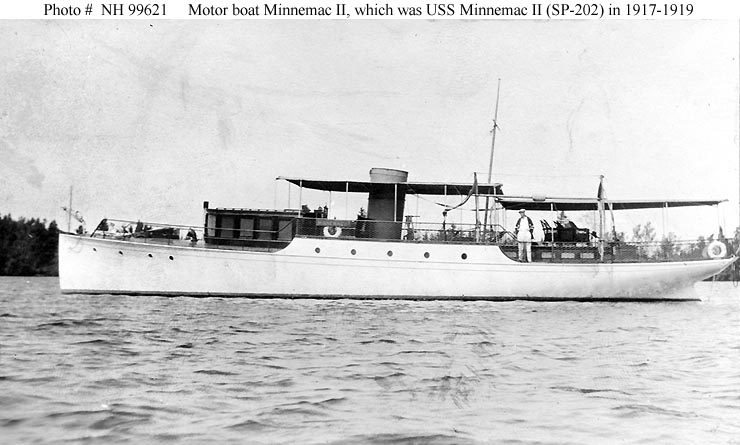
- Minnemac II in civilian use sometime between 1914 and 1917, prior to her U.S. Navy service as USS Minnemac II.

History

United States
- Name: USS Minnemac II
- Namesake: Previous name retained
- Builder: George Lawley and Sons, Neponset, Massachusetts
- Completed: 1914
- Acquired: 7 May 1917
- Commissioned: 5 July 1917
- Fate: Returned to owner 13 January 1919
- Notes: Operated as civilian motorboat Minnemac II 1914-1917 and from 1919

General characteristics
- Type: Patrol vessel
- Tonnage: 78 Gross register tons
- Length: 78 ft 4 in (23.88 m)
- Beam: 14 ft 6 in (4.42 m)
- Draft: 5 ft (1.5 m)
- Speed: 13 knots
- Complement: 9
- Armament: 1 × 3-pounder gun; 2 × machine guns

USS Minnemac II (SP-202) was a United States Navy patrol vessel in commission from 1917 to 1919.

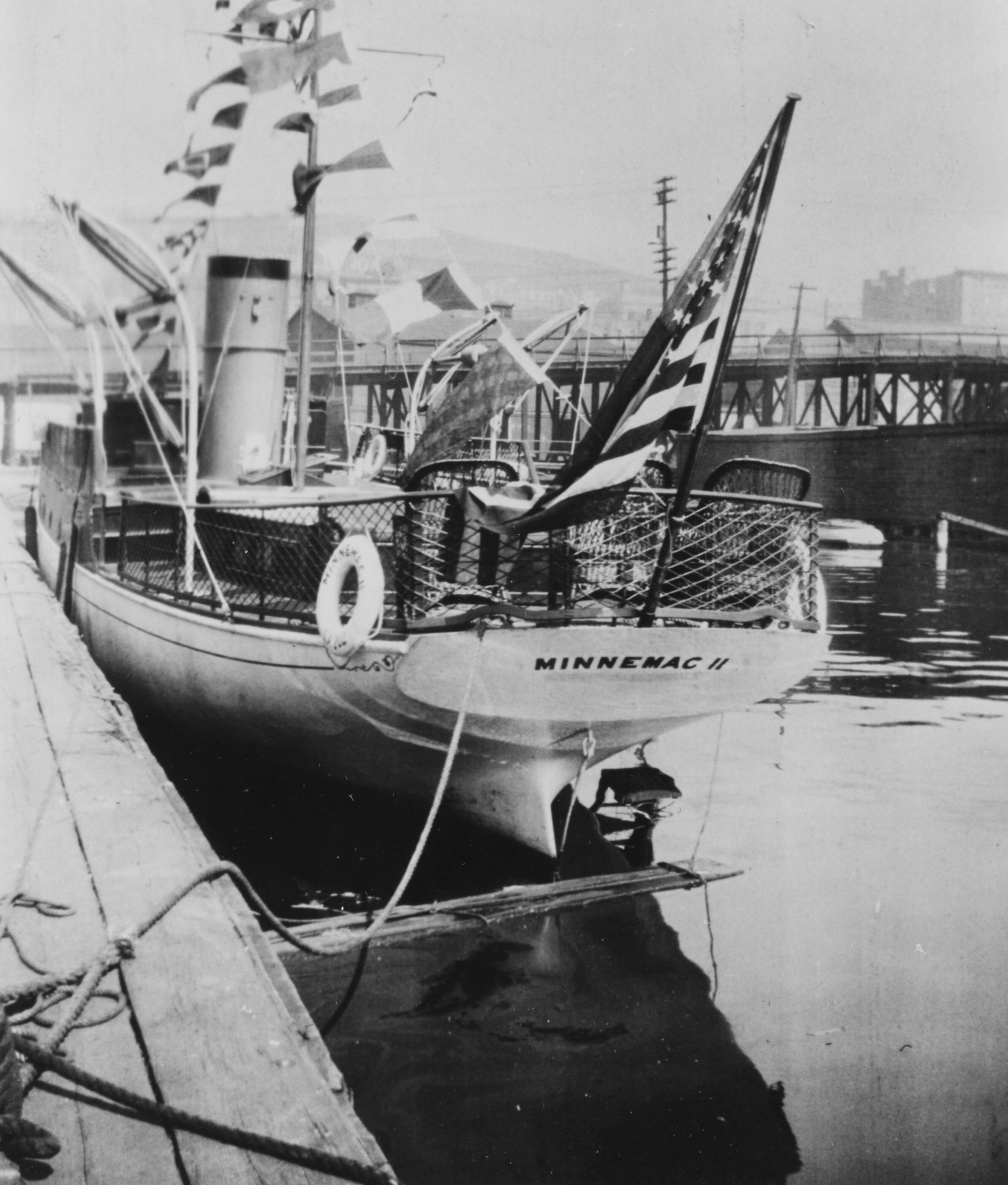
Minnemac II as a civilian motorboat sometime between 1914 and 1917, prior to her U.S. Navy service.

Minnemac II was built as a civilian motorboat of the same name in 1914 by George Lawley and Sons at Neponset, Massachusetts. The U.S. Navy acquired her under a free lease from her owner, Arthur J. Eddy of Chicago, Illinois on 7 May 1917 for World War I service as a patrol vessel. She was enrolled in the Naval Defense Reserve Force on 3 July 1917 and commissioned as USS Minnemac II (SP-202) on 5 July 1917.

Assigned to the Great Lakes, Minnemac II patrolled the waters of Lake Michigan out of her assigned section patrol base.

Following the end of World War I, Minnemac II was returned to her owner on 13 January 1919.
