= USS Mindoro =

USS Mindoro may refer to the following ships of the United States Navy:

- USS Mindoro (1899), was a gunboat in use in the Philippines from 1899 to 1911
- USS Mindoro (YAG‑15), was a freighter purchased in 1942 and in service until 1945
- USS Mindoro (CVE-120), was an escort carrier in service from 1945 to 1955
