= USS Margin =

Patrol vessel of the United States Navy

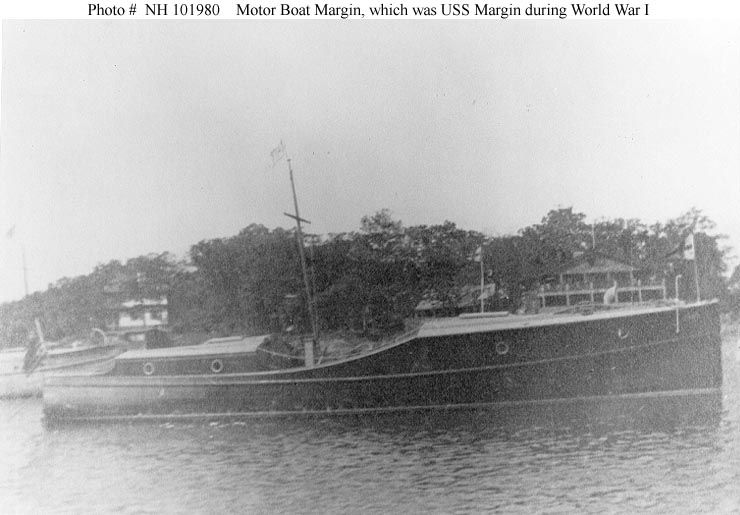
- Margin as a private motorboat in 1917.

History

United States
- Name: USS Margin
- Namesake: Previous name retained
- Builder: W. E. Haff, Neptune Island, New York
- Completed: 1917
- Acquired: 21 March 1918
- Commissioned: 28 June 1918
- Fate: Returned to owner 1 April 1919
- Notes: Operated as private motorboat Margin 1917-1918 and from 1919

General characteristics
- Type: Patrol vessel
- Displacement: 2.5 tons
- Length: 41 ft 6 in (12.65 m)
- Beam: 7 ft (2.1 m)
- Draft: 2 ft 6 in (0.76 m)
- Speed: 13 knots
- Complement: 4
- Armament: 1 × machine gun

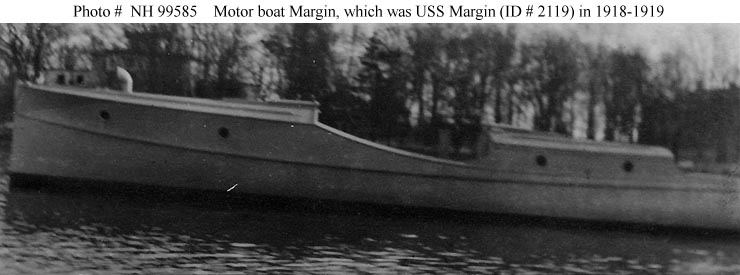
Margin as a private motorboat in 1917, possibly photographed when she was inspected by the 3rd Naval District on 6 December 1917.

USS Margin (SP-2119), also ID-2119, was a United States Navy patrol vessel in commission from 1918 to 1919.

Margin was built as a private motorboat of the same name in 1917 by W. E. Haff at Neptune Island, New York. On 6 December 1917, the 3rd Naval District inspected her for possible naval service, and on 21 March 1918 the U.S. Navy acquired her under a free lease from her owner, W. D. Hatch of Neptune Island, for use as a section patrol boat during World War I. She was commissioned as USS Margin (SP-2119 or ID-2119) on 28 June 1919.

Assigned to the 4th Naval District, Margin served on patrol duty for the rest of World War I. The Navy returned her to Hatch on 1 April 1919.
