= USS Me-Too =

Patrol vessel of the United States Navy

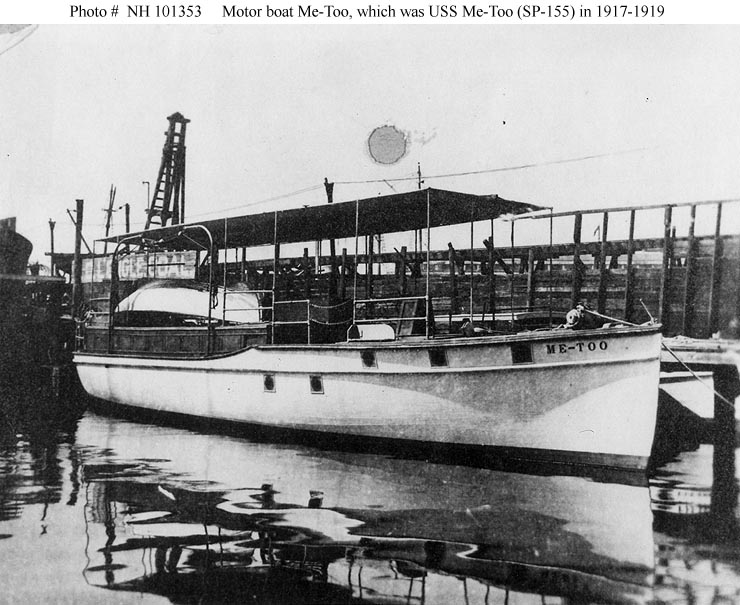
- Me-Too in civilian use before her U.S. Navy service.

History

United States
- Name: USS Me-Too
- Namesake: Previous name retained
- Builder: Julius Ollsen, Dames Point, Florida
- Completed: 1913
- Acquired: 8 May 1917
- Commissioned: 28 June 1917
- Fate: Sold 1 December 1919
- Notes: Operated as private motorboat Me-Too 1913-1917

General characteristics
- Type: Patrol vessel
- Tonnage: 12 tons
- Length: 40 ft (12 m)
- Beam: 10 ft (3.0 m)
- Draft: 4 ft (1.2 m)
- Speed: 9 knots
- Armament: None

USS Me-Too (SP-155) was a motorboat that served in the United States Navy as a patrol vessel from 1917 to 1919.

Me-Too was built as a civilian motorboat in 1913 by Julius Ollsen at Dames Point, Florida. The U.S. Navy bought her from her owner, A. J. Shad of Jacksonville, Florida, on 8 May 1917 for use as a patrol boat during World War I. She was commissioned on 28 June 1917 at Jacksonville as USS Me-Too (SP-155).

Me-Too was assigned to the 6th Naval District, where she operated out of the section base at Jacksonville and patrolled the lower reaches of the St. Johns River. After the Armistice with Germany that ended the war on 11 November 1918, she remained at Jacksonville.

Me-Too was sold to Carl Worden on 1 December 1919.
