= USS Mervine =

USS Mervine may refer to the following ships of the United States Navy:

- USS Mervine (DD-322), a Clemson-class destroyer, commissioned in 1921 and decommissioned in 1930
- USS Mervine (DD-489), a Gleaves-class destroyer, commissioned in 1942 and decommissioned in 1949
