= USS Mustang (IX-155) =

US navy schooner built in 1899

History

United States
- Name: USS Mustang
- Namesake: Mustang
- Builder: H. K. Hall
- Laid down: as William H. Smith 1899
- Acquired: 28 January 1944
- In service: 17 April 1944
- Out of service: 16 May 1946
- Renamed: 6 February 1944
- Stricken: 5 June 1946
- Fate: Transferred to Maritime Commission

General characteristics
- Displacement: 566 tons
- Length: 170 ft 4 in (51.92 m)
- Beam: 37 ft 6 in (11.43 m)
- Depth of hold: 12 ft 8 in (3.86 m)
- Armament: None

USS Mustang (IX‑155) was a four‑master wooden schooner in the United States Navy.

Mustang was built as William H. Smith in 1899 by H. K. Hall, Port Blakely, Washington, U.S. During the next four decades, she sailed the Pacific coast between San Francisco and Alaskan ports in the fishing trade. She was acquired by the United States Navy from Alaska Salmon Co. of San Francisco, 28 January 1944; converted for Navy use by Pacific Drydock & Repair Co., Oakland, California; and renamed Mustang 6 February 1944.

Following completion of her conversion 17 April 1944, Mustang was assigned to the Amphibious Training Base at Coronado, California. During the remainder of World War II she provided training facilities at Coronado. She was declared surplus to Navy needs 16 May 1946, her name struck from the Navy list 5 June, and she was transferred to the Maritime Commission. Subsequently, she was sold to Arthur Banks of Los Angeles, California.
