= USS Muscatine =

USS Muscatine is a name borne by two vessels of the U.S. Navy:

- USS Muscatine (ID-2226), a refrigerator ship built in 1917
- USS Muscatine (AK-197), a cargo ship launched 16 June 1944
