= USS Maquinna =

Tugboat of the United States Navy

History

United States
- Name: USS Maquinna (YTB-225)
- Builder: John Trumpy & Sons Inc., Gloucester City, NJ
- Launched: 30 April 1944
- Sponsored by: Mrs. Margaret O. Trumpy
- Commissioned: 19 September 1944
- Reclassified: YTB‑225 15 May 1944
- Stricken: 29 October 1946
- Fate: presented as a gift to Washington, D.C.

General characteristics
- Class & type: Cahto-class district harbor tug
- Displacement: 410 long tons (417 t)
- Length: 110 ft 0 in (33.53 m)
- Beam: 27 ft 0 in (8.23 m)
- Draft: 11 ft 4 in (3.45 m)
- Speed: 12 knots (22 km/h; 14 mph)
- Complement: 12
- Armament: 2 × .50-caliber machine guns

USS Maquinna (YTB-225) was launched 30 April 1944 by John Trumpy & Sons, Inc., Gloucester City, New Jersey; sponsored by Mrs. Margaret O. Trumpy; reclassified YTB‑225 15 May 1944; and commissioned 19 September 1944.

Maquinna served the duration of the war within the Potomac River Naval Command. Struck from the Navy list 29 October 1946, she was presented as a gift to Washington, D.C., where for 13 years she saw service with the Fire Department as William T. Belt.
