= USS Manhattan =

USS Manhattan may refer to the following ships of the United States Navy:

- USS Manhattan (1863) was acquired by the Union Navy during the American Civil War and served until March 1902.
- Manhattan (YTB-779) was a large harbor tug serving from 1965 to 2004, reclassified in 2008 as unnamed YT-800.

== See also ==
- Manhattan (Cutter No 30) was built in Panama in 1918 for use by the U.S. Coast Guard.
