= USS Manitowoc =

USS Manitowoc has been the name of two ships in the United States Navy.

- USS Manitowoc (PF-61), a Tacoma-class frigate, served from 1944 to 1946 until transferred to the United States Coast Guard.
- USS Manitowoc (LST-1180), a tank landing ship, served from 1973 until 1993.
