= USS Mingo =

USS Mingo or Mingoe may refer to the following vessels of the United States Navy:

- USS Mingo (1862), a stern-wheel steamer, which was purchased by and served in the Union Navy during the American Civil War
- USS Mingoe (1863), was a side‑wheel steam gunboat launched 6 August 1863 and sold 3 October 1867
- USS Mingo (SS-261), was a Gato-class submarine which served from 1943 until 1947
