= USS Mattabesett =

USS Mattabesett or Mattabesset may refer to the following ships of the United States Navy:

- USS Mattabesett (1864), a schooner-rigged, wooden hulled, double-ended, sidewheel gunboat that served from 1864 until 1865
- USS Mattabesset (AOG-52), a gasoline tanker, that served from 1945 until 1968
