= USS Mauna Loa (SP-28) =

Patrol vessel of the United States Navy

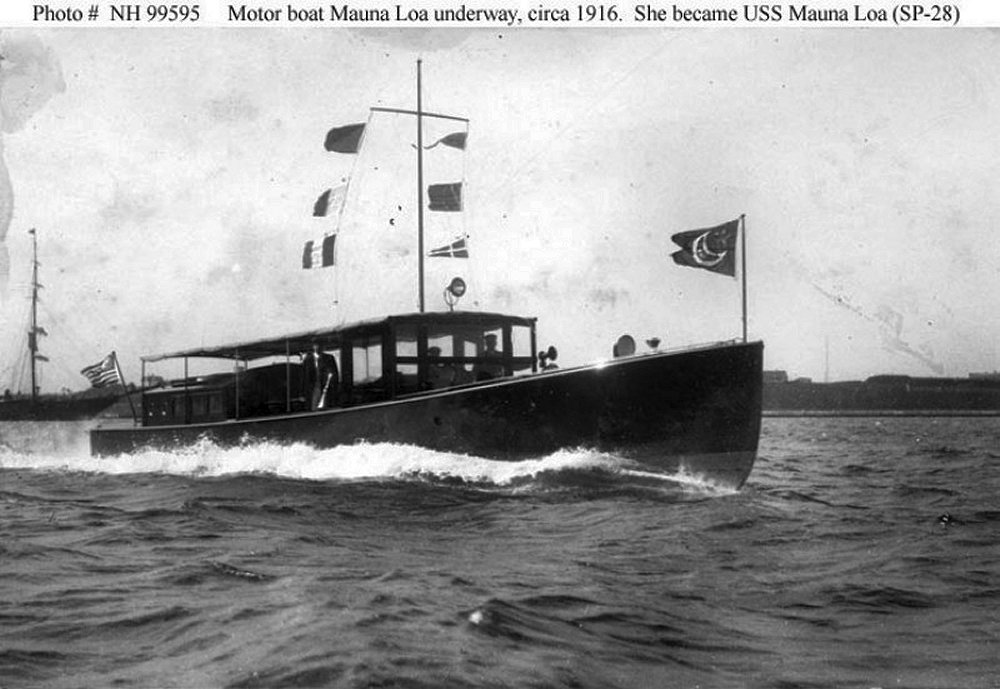
- Mauna Loa ca. 1916 as a private pleasure craft prior to her U.S. Navy service

History

United States
- Name: USS Mauna Loa
- Namesake: Previous name retained
- Builder: George Lawley and Sons, Neponset, Massachusetts
- Completed: 1916
- Acquired: 10 May 1917
- Commissioned: 11 May 1917
- Decommissioned: 5 December 1918
- Fate: Returned to owner 5 December 1918
- Notes: Operated as private motorboat Mauna Loa 1916-1917 and from December 1918

General characteristics
- Type: Patrol vessel
- Tonnage: 18 GRT
- Length: 56 ft (17 m)
- Beam: 9 ft 6 in (2.90 m)
- Draft: 2 ft 9 in (0.84 m)
- Speed: 20 knots (37 km/h; 23 mph)
- Complement: 7
- Armament: 1 × machine gun

The first USS Mauna Loa (SP-28) was an armed motorboat that served in the United States Navy as a patrol vessel from 1917 to 1918.

Mauna Loa was built in 1916 by George Lawley and Sons at Neponset, Massachusetts, as a private motorboat of the same name. The U.S. Navy acquired her from her owner, A. C. James, on a free lease contract on 10 May 1917 for World War I service. She was commissioned as USS Mauna Loa (SP-28) on 11 May 1917.

Mauna Loa was assigned to the 1st Naval District. She patrolled the coast of northern New England until the end of the war.

The Navy decommissioned Mauna Loa on 5 December 1918 and returned her to her owner the same day.
