= USS Murphy =

USS Murphy may refer to the following ships of the United States Navy:

- USS Murphy (DD-603), was a Benson-class destroyer launched in 1942 and sold for scrap in 1971. She earned four battle stars, and survived a partial sinking during World War II.
- USS Michael Murphy, is an Arleigh Burke-class destroyer launched in 2011 and currently in service

== See also ==
- Gleaves-class destroyer
