= USS Minah =

USS Minah may refer to:

- USS Minah (AMc-204), was launched as PCS‑1465 December 1943, redesignated Minah (AMc‑204) January 1945 and decommissioned September 1959
- USS Minah (AM-370), planned as an Admirable-class minesweeper had her construction canceled June 1944
