= USS Manta =

USS Manta may refer to the following ships operated by the United States Navy:

- USS Manta (ID-2036), was acquired and commissioned by the US Navy 8 December 1917 and decommissioned 13 March 1919 and returned to her owner
- USS Manta (SS-299), was launched 7 November 1943 and scrapped in September 1967
