= USS Mona II =

United States Navy patrol vessel used in World War One

History

United States
- Name: USS Mona II
- Namesake: Previous name retained
- Acquired: 11 September 1918
- Commissioned: 1918
- Fate: Returned to owner 7 August 1919
- Notes: Operated as civilian motorboat Mona II to 1918 and from 1919

General characteristics
- Type: Patrol vessel
- Length: 40 ft (12 m)

USS Mona II was a United States Navy patrol vessel in commission from 1918 to 1919.

Mona II was built as a private motorboat of the same name. On 11 September 1918, the U.S. Navy acquired her under a free lease from her owner, H. F. McCormick, for use as a section patrol boat during World War I. She never received a section patrol (SP) number, but she was commissioned as USS Mona II.

Mona II conducted patrols along the United States East Coast for the rest of World War I and into 1919. She was returned to McCormick on 7 August 1919.
