= USS Mindanao =

USS Mindanao may refer to the following ships of the United States Navy:

- USS Mindanao (1898), was a former Spanish unarmored gunboat captured by the US Army on 1 May 1898 and acquired by the US Navy on 17 January 1899. The cost of preparing her for sea duty was too high and she was stricken from the Navy list on 11 February 1905 and sold for scrap.
- USS Mindanao (PR-8), was launched on 28 September 1927 and sunk to prevent capture by the Japanese on 2 May 1942
- USS Mindanao (ARG-3), was acquired by the US Navy on 20 May 1943 and decommissioned on 17 May 1947
