= USS Monocacy =

Several ships in the United States Navy have been named USS Monocacy for the Battle of Monocacy:

- USS Monocacy (1864), a gunboat launched in 1864, and served until 1903
- USS Monocacy (PG-20), commissioned in 1914 and decommissioned in 1939
- USS Genesee (AT-55), originally the civilian tug Monocacy (1905)
