= USS Mitscher =

USS Mitscher may refer to:

- USS Mitscher (DL-2), was launched in January 1952 and decommissioned in 1980
- USS Mitscher (DDG-57), is an Arleigh Burke-class destroyer commissioned in 1994 and currently in active service
