= USS Metacom =

USS Metacom may refer to the following ships operated by the United States Navy:

- USS Metacom (YN-51), a net tender later reclassified YTB-740.
- USS Metacom (YTB-829), a Natick-class tugboat serving the Naval Submarine Base, New London, Connecticut
