= USS Mizar =

USS Mizar may refer to the following ships of the United States Navy:

- USS Mizar (AF-12), was a cargo ship during World War II
- USNS Mizar (T-AGOR-11), was an oceanographic research ship and submarine rescue ship
