= USS Mallard =

USS Mallard is a name of two U.S. Navy vessels:

- USS Mallard (AM-44), a minesweeper, served in the Navy 1919–1946.
- USS Mallard (AMCU-30), a landing craft, later a mine detector, served in the Navy 1944–1960.
