= USS Maple =

USS Maple may refer to the following ships of the United States Navy:

- USS Maple (1893), was a tender with the US Navy and the Lighthouse Service during World War I
- USS Maple (AN-25), was renamed Hackberry shortly before launching in October 1940

== See also ==
- USCGC Maple (WLB-207), US Coast Guard cutter
