= USS Minivet =

USS Minivet may refer to the following ships of the United States Navy:

- USS Minivet (AM-371), was a minesweeper launched 8 November 1944 and sank after striking a mine 29 December 1945
- USS Minivet (AMCU-32), was launched LCI(L)-969 27 March 1944, renamed and reclassified Minivet (AMCU-32) on 7 March 1952 and sunk as a target 30 November 1954
