= USS Mirna =

US Navy patrol vessel

History

United States
- Name: USS Mirna
- Namesake: Previous name retained
- Completed: 1911
- Acquired: Late July 1917
- Commissioned: 1917
- Fate: Returned to owner 8 May 1918
- Notes: Operated as private motorboat Mirna 1911-1917 and from 1918

General characteristics
- Type: Patrol vessel
- Tonnage: 7 Gross register tons
- Length: 40 ft 4 in (12.29 m)
- Beam: 10 ft 6 in (3.20 m)
- Draft: 4 ft (1.2 m) aft
- Speed: 10 knots
- Complement: 5
- Armament: None

USS Mirna (SP-1214) was a United States Navy patrol vessel in commission from 1917 to 1918.

Mirna was built in 1911 as a private motorboat of the same name. In late July 1917, the U.S. Navy acquired her under a free lease from her owner, Joseph Snellenburg Philadelphia, Pennsylvania, for use as a section patrol vessel during World War I. She was commissioned as USS Mirna (SP-1214).

Assigned to the 4th Naval District on 17 August 1917, Mirna served on patrol duties on the Delaware River through the end of 1917.

In January 1918 Mirna was ordered returned to her owner. The Navy returned her to Snellenburg on 8 May 1918.
