= USS Mariner (1906) =

Tugboat of the United States Navy

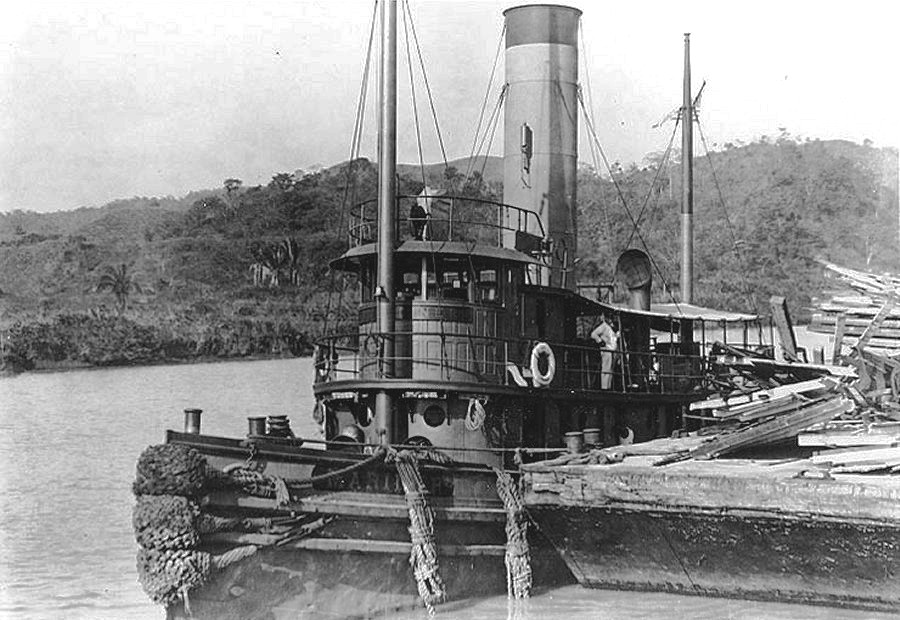
- Tug Mariner photographed prior to 1917, while still in civilian service.

History

United States
- Name: USS Mariner
- Completed: 1906
- Acquired: 1 February 1918
- Commissioned: 1 February 1918
- Fate: Returned to his owner, 13 January 1919

General characteristics
- Type: Tugboat
- Displacement: 234 long tons (238 t)
- Length: 113 ft (34 m)
- Beam: 25 ft 6 in (7.77 m)
- Draft: 7 ft (2.1 m)
- Propulsion: steam engine
- Speed: 12 kn (14 mph; 22 km/h)
- Complement: 23
- Armament: 2 × 1-pounder guns

USS Mariner was a commercial tugboat operating in the Panama Canal area. When World War I broke out, she was commissioned and armed by the United States Navy, and spent the rest of the war protecting vessels in the vicinity of the canal from German submarines.

== Service history ==
The second ship to be so named by the U.S. Navy, Mariner, a 234 long tons (238 t) steam tug, was built at Camden, New Jersey, in 1906. Following America’s entry into World War I, she was taken over by the Navy and commissioned 1 February 1918. She was employed by the Panama Canal Commission during the construction of the Panama Canal and after its completion. Mariner patrolled the approaches to the canal and provided tug and towing services during the remainder of World War I. She was returned to her owner 13 January 1919 and resumed her civilian work. Her name was struck from the Navy list. Mariner's ultimate fate is unknown.
