= USS Marathon =

USS Marathon may refer to the following ships of the United States Navy:

- USS Marathon (APA-200), was an attack transport commissioned 28 October 1944
- USS Marathon (PGM-89), was a patrol craft commissioned 11 May 1968
