= USS M. M. Davis =

Minesweeper of the United States Navy

History

United States
- Name: USS M. M. Davis
- Namesake: Previous name retained
- Builder: Jackson and Sharp Company, Wilmington, Delaware
- Completed: 1912
- Acquired: 7 April 1917
- Commissioned: 1917
- Stricken: 1 May 1919
- Fate: Sold 1 July 1919
- Notes: Served as commercial motorboat M. M. Davis 1912-1917 and 1919-1934

General characteristics
- Type: Minesweeper
- Tonnage: 298 tons
- Length: 150 ft (46 m)
- Beam: 22 ft (6.7 m)
- Draft: 8 ft 6 in (2.59 m)
- Armament: 2 × 1-pounder guns

USS M. M. Davis (SP-314) was a United States Navy minesweeper in commission from 1917 to 1919.

M. M. Davis was built as a commercial motorboat in 1912 by Jackson and Sharp Company at Wilmington, Delaware. The U.S. Navy purchased her from the C. E. Davis Packing Company on 7 April 1917 for World War I use.

Assigned to the 5th Naval District, M. M. Davis operated as a minesweeper for the rest of World War I.

M. M. Davis was stricken from the Navy List on 1 May 1919 and sold back to C. E. Davis Packing on 1 July 1919. She operated commercially until 1934.
