= USS Moccasin =

USS Moccasin may refer to more than one United States Navy ship:

- USS Moccasin (1864), a tug in commission from 1864 to 1865 that was assigned to the North Atlantic Blockading Squadron during the American Civil War
- USS Moccasin (SS-5), a Plunger-class submarine in commission from 1903 to 1919
- USS Moccasin (ID-1322), a refrigerated cargo ship in commission from 1918 to 1919
