= USS Mary Louise =

Patrol vessel of the United States Navy

History

United States
- Name: USS Mary Louise
- Namesake: Previous name retained
- Builder: Milton Point Shipyard, New York
- Acquired: 24 August 1917
- In service: 27 August 1917
- Fate: Returned to owner 30 October 1917

General characteristics
- Type: Patrol vessel
- Length: 47 ft 10 in (14.58 m)
- Beam: 9 ft 6 in (2.90 m)
- Draft: 4 ft (1.2 m)
- Speed: 8 knots

USS Mary Louise (SP-356) was a patrol boat that served in the United States Navy from August to October 1917.

Mary Louise was built as a private boat of the same name in by the Milton Point Shipyard in New York. On 24 August 1917, the U.S. Navy acquired her on a free-lease basis from her owner, J. S. Williams of Wilmington, North Carolina, for use as a patrol boat during World War I. She was placed in service as USS Mary Louise (SP-356) on 27 August 1917.

Assigned to the 6th Naval District, Mary Louise served on section patrol duties for about two months.

Mary Louise was returned to her owner on 30 October 1917.
