= USS Marietta (1805) =

Gunboat of the United States Navy

History

United States
- Name: USS Marietta
- Builder: Edward W. Tupper
- Laid down: 1803
- Launched: 1805
- Commissioned: 1805
- Decommissioned: date unknown
- Stricken: date unknown
- Fate: fate unknown

General characteristics
- Displacement: not known
- Length: 52 ft (16 m)
- Beam: 14 ft 6 in (4.42 m)
- Draft: 5 ft 8 in (1.73 m)
- Propulsion: 28 oared rows
- Speed: varied
- Complement: greater than 65
- Armament: one 24 pounder gun, four 6 pounder guns

USS Marietta was a small, man-powered gunboat acquired by the U.S. Navy in 1805 for the task of coastal defense. She had 28 rows of oars, which required the effort of 56 seamen to propel her. However, as primitive as she might seem, she was armed with a formidable gun which shot a 24-pound cannonball, plus a number of smaller, but lethal, guns, which required a number of gunners to be on board during operations.

== Rowed versus sail ==
The value of such a craft at the time was that it did not depend on wind to propel it, and it could operate stealthily in and around harbors and rivers at night.

== Thomas Jefferson’s fleet of coastal defense gunboats ==
The first ship to be named Marietta by the Navy, she was a 5 gun, 28-oared row gunboat. She was built from 1803 to 1805 by Edward W. Tupper of Marietta, Ohio, as part of the fleet of gunboats President Thomas Jefferson planned to use as America's first line of coastal defense.

== Marietta’s service during the days of the early Republic ==
Marietta was sent down to New Orleans, Louisiana, around 1807, but no records are extant that show her subsequent fate. She probably guarded the southern and southeast Atlantic coasts of the United States during the years before the War of 1812.

== Final disposition ==
Navy records do not indicate her final days. Since she was in service just prior to the War of 1812, there is the possibility she participated in it, or was in service during it.
