= USS Manayunk =

USS Manayunk may refer to:

- USS Manayunk (1864), was renamed Ajax 15 June 1869
- USS Manayunk (AN-81), was launched 30 March 1945
