= USS Maui =

USS Maui has been the name of more than one United States Navy ship, and may refer to:

- SS Maui (1916), Matson liner launched 1916 briefly commissioned as a troop transport USS Maui (ID-1514) from 1918 to 1919, returned to commercial service and purchased 3 December 1941 by United States Department of War as the WW II Army Transport USAT Maui until laid up for disposal 30 August 1946.
- USS Maui (ARG-8), an internal combustion repair ship in commission from 1944 to 1946, originally named USS Leyte and renamed USS Maui in 1945
