= USS Mayrant =

Two ships in the United States Navy have been named USS Mayrant for John Mayrant.

- The first USS Mayrant (DD-31) was a modified Paulding-class destroyer launched in 1910, served in World War I and decommissioned in 1920.
- The second USS Mayrant (DD-402) was a Benham-class destroyer launched in 1938, served in World War II and decommissioned in 1946. She survived the Operation Crossroads atom-bomb tests.
