= USS Mercer =

USS Mercer may refer to the following ships operated by the United States Navy:

- USS Mercer (ID-3837), was acquired by the US Navy 16 January 1919 and decommissioned 26 May 1919
- USS Mercer (APL-39), is a barracks craft commissioned 19 September 1945 and currently in active service
