= USS Maysie =

Patrol vessel of the United States Navy

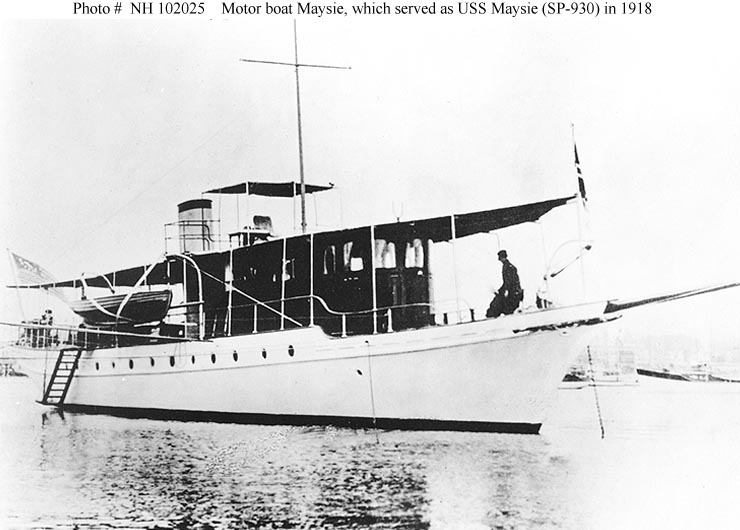
- Maysie as a private yacht sometime between 1899 and 1917.

History

United States
- Name: USS Maysie
- Namesake: Previous name retained
- Builder: Daimler Manufacturing Company, Astoria, New York
- Completed: 1899
- Acquired: 1917
- Commissioned: 19 February 1918
- Decommissioned: 8 December 1918
- Fate: Returned to owner 8 December 1918
- Notes: Operated as private yacht Verano, Laurena, and Maysie 1899–1917 and as Maysie from 1918

General characteristics
- Type: Patrol vessel
- Tonnage: 64 Gross register tons
- Length: 94 ft (29 m)
- Beam: 15 ft 4 in (4.67 m)
- Draft: 5 ft 6 in (1.68 m)
- Propulsion: Two 35-horsepower (26-kilowatt) Daimler gasoline engines, two shafts
- Speed: 7.4 knots
- Complement
- Armament

USS Maysie (SP-930) was a United States Navy patrol vessel in commission from February to December 1918.

Maysie was built in 1899 as the private motor yacht Verano by the Daimler Manufacturing Company at Astoria on Long Island, New York. She soon was renamed Laurena. In 1901, James Harkness sold her to Oscar Lipton of New York City, and she later operated under the name Maysie. By 1917, Maysie was the property of M. C. Schweinert.

In 1917, the U.S. Navy acquired Maysie from Schweinert for use as a section patrol boat during World War I. She was commissioned as USS Maysie (SP-930) on 19 February 1918.

Assigned to the 3rd Naval District and based at New York City, Maysie operated on patrol duties for the rest of World War I.

Maysie was decommissioned on 8 December 1918 and was returned to Schweinert the same day.
