= USS Mail =

Tender of the United States Navy

History

United States
- In service: 1862
- Out of service: 1865
- Captured: 1 August 1862
- Fate: Sold, 20 October 1865

General characteristics
- Propulsion: sail

USS Mail was a schooner captured by the Union Navy during the American Civil War.

After litigation by the U.S. Treasury Department in which Mail was awarded to the Union Navy, she was eventually used by the Union Navy as a tender for divers working in the water on submerged ships and other obstacles.

== Service history ==
Mail was a sutler's schooner captured by Freeborn while unloading cargo about 6 miles up the Coan River, 1 August 1862. However, 6 days later she was released upon the request of Secretary of the Treasury Salmon P. Chase. She was again seized by the guard vessel at Alexandria, Virginia, after having cleared that port under a false manifest which listed 428 cans of strong drink as milk. This time intercession of the U.S. Treasury Department was unavailing and the schooner was assigned to the South Atlantic Blockading Squadron and placed in service as a divers’ tender. At the end of the Civil War she was laid up at Port Royal, South Carolina, until sold there 20 October 1865.
