= USS Myrtle (SP-3289) =

Patrol vessel of the United States Navy

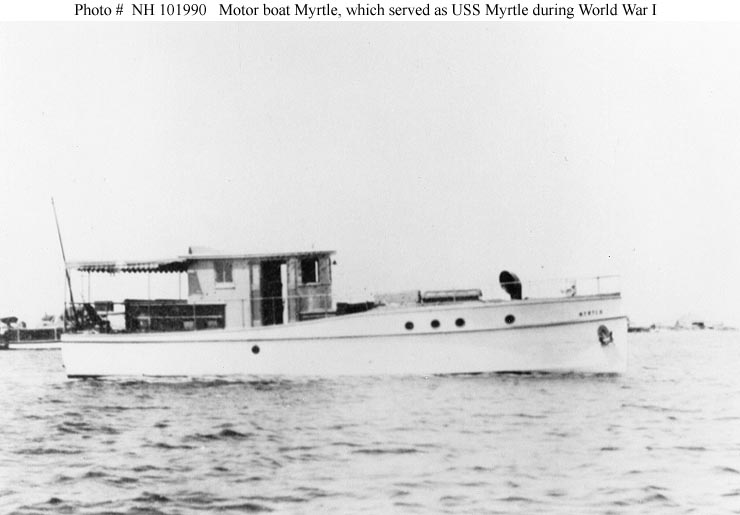
- Myrtle as a civilian motorboat sometime between 1915 and 1918.

History

United States
- Name: USS Myrtle
- Namesake: Previous name retained
- Builder: T. B. Hayman, Elizabeth City, North Carolina
- Completed: 1915
- Acquired: 16 October 1918
- Fate: Returned to owner 27 January 1919
- Notes: Operated as private motorboat Myrtle 1915–1918 and from 1919

General characteristics
- Type: Patrol vessel
- Tonnage: 21 Gross register tons
- Length: 40 ft 9 in (12.42 m)
- Beam: 11 ft 8 in (3.56 m)
- Draft: 3 ft 9 in (1.14 m)
- Speed: 9 knots
- Complement: 6
- Armament: None

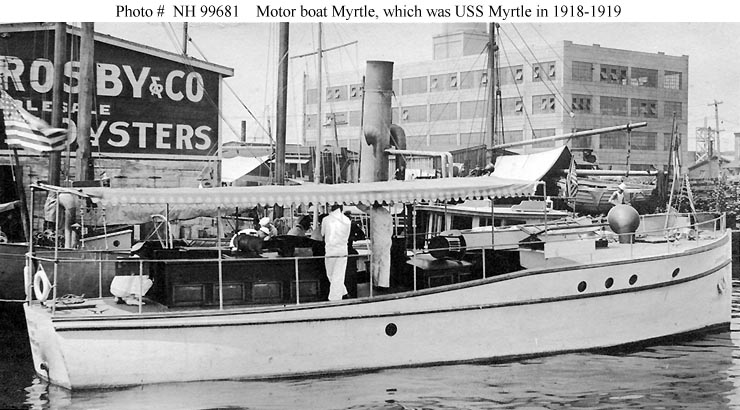
Myrtle prior to her United States Navy service, probably at the time of her inspection by the 5th Naval District at Norfolk, Virginia, on 26 August 1918 for possible naval service.

The third USS Myrtle (SP-3289) was a United States Navy patrol vessel in commission from 1918 to 1919.

Myrtle was built as a private motorboat of the same name in 1915 by T. B. Hayman at Elizabeth City, North Carolina. On 26 August 1918, the 5th Naval District inspected her at Norfolk, Virginia, for possible naval service, and on 16 October 1918, the U.S. Navy leased her from her owner, A. S. Rascol of Windsor, North Carolina, for use as a section patrol boat during World War I. She was commissioned as USS Myrtle (SP-3289).

Assigned to the 5th Naval District, Myrtle carried out patrol and dispatch duties in the Norfolk area for the rest of 1918.

The Navy returned Myrtle to Rascol on 27 January 1919.
