= USS Manada =

Tugboat of the United States Navy

History

United States
- Name: USS Manada (YTB-224)
- Builder: Elizabeth City Shipyard, Elizabeth City, NC
- Launched: 5 July 1944
- Sponsored by: Miss Virginia Liverman
- In service: 2 December 1944
- Reclassified: YTB‑224 on 15 May 1944
- Stricken: 17 September 1954
- Fate: disposed of by sale

General characteristics
- Class & type: Cahto-class district harbor tug
- Displacement: 410 long tons (417 t)
- Length: 110 ft 0 in (33.53 m)
- Beam: 27 ft 0 in (8.23 m)
- Draft: 11 ft 4 in (3.45 m)
- Speed: 12 knots (22 km/h; 14 mph)
- Complement: 12
- Armament: 2 × .50-caliber machine guns

USS Manada (YTB-224), originally designated YT‑224, was redesignated YTB‑224 on 15 May 1944; launched by Elizabeth City Shipyard, Elizabeth City, NC, 5 July 1944; sponsored by Miss Virginia Liverman; and accepted and placed in service 2 December 1944.

Manada, assigned to the 5th Naval District, performed tug and miscellaneous duties out of Norfolk until transferred to the 6th Naval District 28 June 1946. With that district less than 2 months, she was reassigned to the 16th Fleet at Orange, Texas, 16 August. Out of service for only a short time, she was reactivated 10 October and assigned to the 8th Naval District. She remained in the Great Lakes area until transferred to the 6th Naval District 20 August 1948. Serving that district from 1 September until inactivated in January 1954, Manada operated primarily in support of the varied activities of the Naval Air Station, Pensacola, Florida. Struck from the Navy list 17 September 1954, she was later disposed of by sale.
