= USS Mendota =

USS Mendota is a name used more than once by the U.S. Navy:

- USS Mendota (1863), a sidewheel gunboat, was launched 13 January 1863.
- USS Mendota (YT-33), a tugboat, formerly USS Concord
