= Modoc YT-16 =

Tugboat of the United States Navy

History

United States
- Name: Modoc to 5 October 1942; YTL-16
- Builder: J.H. Dialogue & Sons
- Acquired: 29 April 1898
- In service: 29 April 1898
- Out of service: 30 January 1947
- Fate: Transferred to Maritime Commission, 1947
- Status: unknown
- Notes: Ship International Radio Callsign: NBDS

General characteristics
- Displacement: 240 tons
- Length: 96 feet
- Beam: 21 feet
- Draft: 8 feet 6 inches
- Propulsion: one compound steam engine, one single-end coal-fired boiler, single propeller, 175 shp
- Speed: 10 Knots
- Complement: 7

Modoc was a steam tug, built in 1890 as the commercial tug Enterprise, in service with the United States Navy from 1898 to 1947. The tug had been assigned the hull number YT‑16 in 1920. When the name Modoc was cancelled 5 October 1942 the tug became the unnamed YT‑16 until reclassified in 1944 to become YTL-16. The tug served for 49 years and in both World War I and World War II before being transferred to the Maritime Commission in early 1947 for disposal.

== Ship history ==
The non‑seagoing, iron steam yard tug Enterprise, built in 1890, had served in a civilian role until she was acquired by the U.S. Navy and placed in service as Modoc 29 April 1898 for Spanish–American War service at the Philadelphia Navy Yard. On 17 July 1920, she was designated District Harbor Tug and given the hull number YT-16. The name Modoc was cancelled on 5 October 1942 during the Second World War becoming the unnamed YT‑16. In 1944 she was redesignated as the unnamed District Harbor Tug, small YTL-16. Three years later, on 30 January 1947, YTL-16 was placed out of service after 49 years, including two World Wars, and transferred to the Maritime Commission for final disposal.

=== USS L-1 incident ===
In 1921, the U.S. Navy Submarine USS L-1 was rammed by a pilot boat off the Delaware Capes. Along with the Salvage Tug USS Kalmia (AT-23), the two tugs drained the water out of the stricken submarine, and towed her 85 miles back to shore. An excerpt of the incident from the 8 February 1921 issue of the Evening Public Ledger is as follows:

"The United States submarine L-1 (SS-40), rammed last week by a pilot-boat off the Delaware capes, came into the Philadelphia Navy Yard yesterday, supported by the salvage tug USS Kalmia (AT-23) (left) and the navy yard tug Modoc (YT-16). At the right can be seen a ten-inch pump line from the which kept the water out of the engine hatch-room of the submersible during the trip from Lowes, Del. A smaller pump line worked from the Modoc."

== Ship awards ==

- World War I Victory Medal
- World War II Victory Medal
- American Campaign Medal
