= USS Mystic =

Ships of the United States Navy known as USS Mystic:

- USS Mystic (1853), in service 1858–1865

Other US Navy ships named Mystic:

- DSRV-1 Mystic
