= USS Milledgeville =

USS Milledgeville has been the name of more than one United States Navy ship, and may refer to:

- USS Milledgeville (PF-94), a patrol frigate in commission from 1945 to 1946
- USS Milledgeville (PF-98), a patrol frigate cancelled in 1943
- USS Milledgeville (PC-1263), a patrol craft in commission from 1943 to 1956 as USS PC-1263 and as USS Milledgeville from 1956 to 1959
