= USS Marjorie M. =

Patrol vessel of the United States Navy

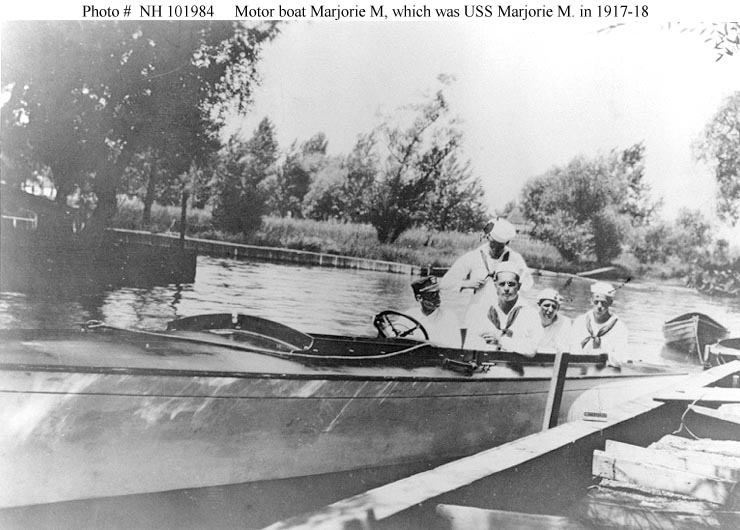
- Marjorie M. as a private motorboat. The United States Navy officer and four enlisted men aboard her indicate that this photograph was taken around the time of her acquisition by the U.S. Navy in August 1917.

History

United States
- Name: USS Marjorie M.
- Namesake: Previous name retained
- Builder: Gottshalk, Philadelphia, Pennsylvania
- Completed: 1912
- Acquired: 18 August 1917
- Commissioned: 18 August 1917
- Fate: Returned to owner 23 November 1918
- Notes: Operated as private motorboat Marjorie M. 1912-1917 and from 1918

General characteristics
- Type: Patrol vessel
- Length: 32 ft (9.8 m)
- Beam: 5 ft 6 in (1.68 m)
- Draft: 1 ft 10 in (0.56 m) mean
- Speed: 22 knots
- Complement: 5

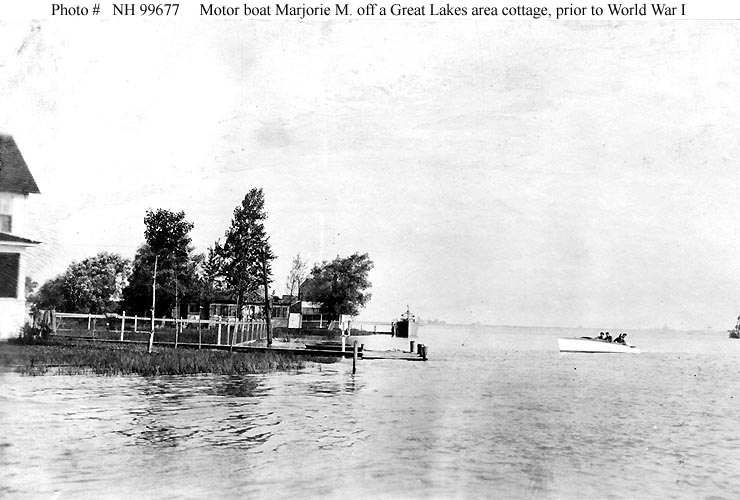
Marjorie M. (at right) as a private motorboat off a cottage on the Great Lakes sometime between 1912 and 1917.

USS Marjorie M. (SP-1080) was a United States Navy patrol vessel in commission from 1917 to 1918.

Marjorie M. was built as a private "runabout"-type motorboat of the same name in 1912 by Gottshalk at Philadelphia, Pennsylvania. On 18 August 1917, the U.S. Navy acquired her under a free lease from her owner, A. P. Dennis, for use as a section patrol boat during World War I. She was commissioned the same day as USS Marjorie M. (SP-1080).

Assigned to the 9th Naval District, Marjorie M. served on patrol duty on the Great Lakes through the end of World War I.

The Navy returned Marjorie M. to Dennis on 23 November 1918.
