= USS Marmora =

USS Marmora may refer to more than one United States Navy ship:

- USS Marmora (1862), a sternwheel steamer purchased on 17 September 1862 and decommissioned on 7 July 1865
- USS Marmora (IX-189), a tanker commissioned on 13 December 1944 for use as a mobile floating storage ship, and decommissioned on 11 February 1946
