= USS Marguerite =

Patrol vessel of the United States Navy

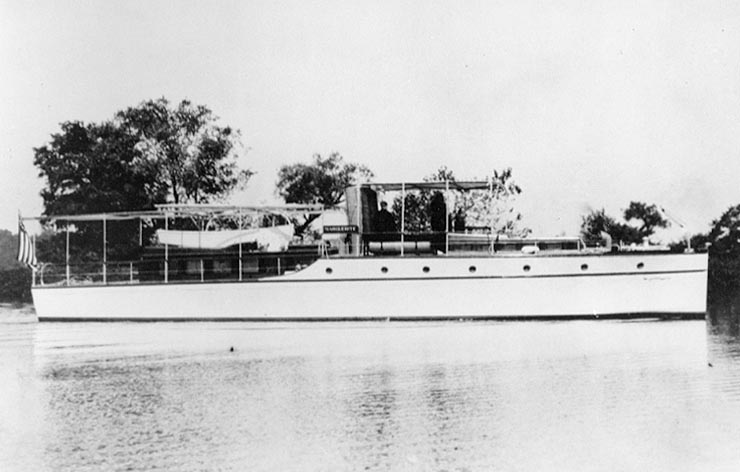
- Marguerite in private use in 1916 or 1917, prior to her U.S. Navy service.

History

United States
- Name: USS Marguerite
- Namesake: Previous name retained
- Builder: Smith-Williams Company, Salisbury, Maryland
- Completed: 1916
- Acquired: 27 June 1917
- Commissioned: 2 October 1917
- Fate: Transferred to Department of the Treasury 11 December 1919 for use by U.S. Coast Guard
- Notes: Built as civilian motorboat Marguerite

General characteristics
- Type: Patrol vessel
- Tonnage: 33 tons
- Length: 60 ft (18 m)
- Beam: 13 ft (4.0 m)
- Draft: 3 ft 6 in (1.07 m)
- Speed: 12 knots
- Complement: 6
- Armament: 1 × 1-pounder gun; 1 × machine gun

USS Marguerite (SP-193) was a United States Navy patrol vessel in commission from 1917 to 1919.

Marguerite was built as a civilian motorboat of the same name in 1916 by the Smith-Williams Company at Salisbury, Maryland. The U.S. Navy purchased her from her owner, W. D. Sargent of Bayonne, New Jersey, on 27 June 1917 for World War I service as a patrol vessel. She was commissioned as USS Marguerite (SP-193) on 2 October 1917.

Marguerite was assigned to the 7th Naval District and served as a section patrol boat based at St. Augustine, Florida.

Marguerite was transferred to the Department of the Treasury on 11 December 1919 for use by the United States Coast Guard.
