= USS Manatee (SP-51) =

Patrol vessel of the United States Navy

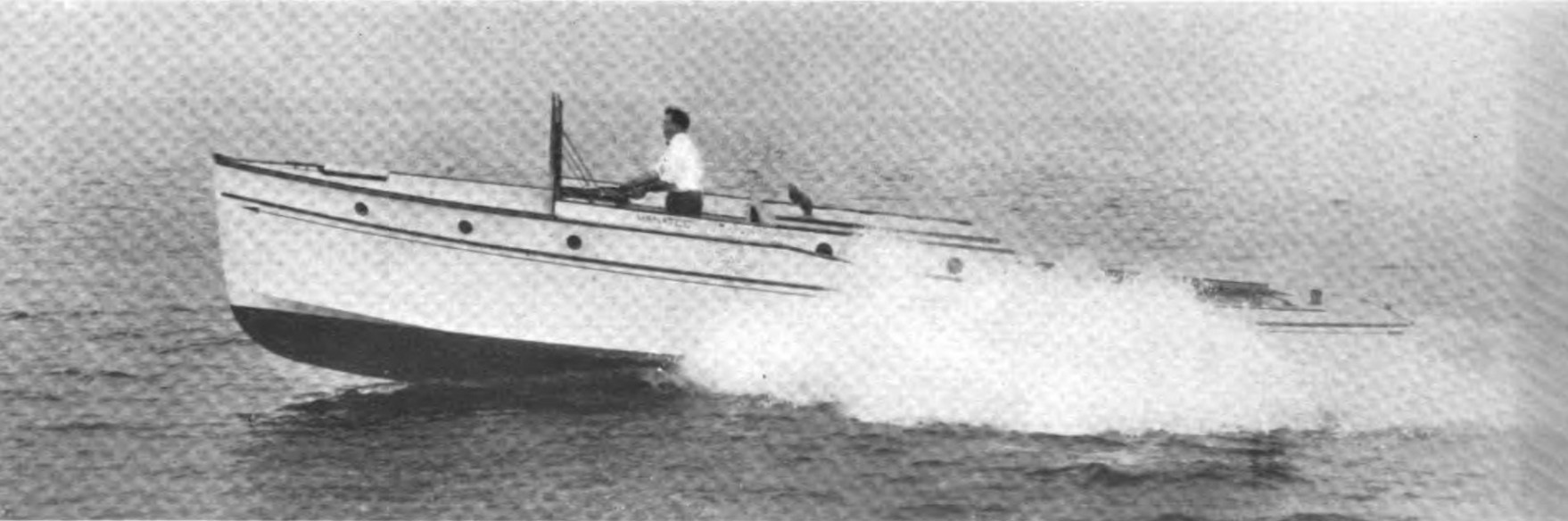
- Manatee in private prewar service

History

United States
- Name: USS Manatee
- Namesake: Previous name retained
- Builder: Graves Yacht Yard, Marblehead, Massachusetts
- Completed: 1915
- Acquired: 21 April 1917
- Commissioned: 23 April 1917
- Stricken: By 1 July 1920
- Notes: In private use as motorboat Manatee 1915-1917

General characteristics
- Type: Patrol vessel
- Tonnage: 2 tons
- Length: 35 ft (11 m)
- Beam: 8 ft 6 in (2.59 m)
- Draft: 2 ft 3 in (0.69 m)
- Propulsion: Gasoline engine
- Speed: 22 knots
- Complement: 4
- Armament: 1 × 1-pounder gun

The first USS Manatee (SP-51) was an armed motorboat that served as a United States Navy patrol vessel from 1917 until sometime shortly after World War I.

Manatee was built in 1915 for Lawrence F. Percival of the Corinthian Yacht Club of Boston as a wooden-hulled, gasoline-powered private motorboat of the same name designed by Samuel H. Brown of Marblehead, Massachusetts and built by Graves Yacht Yard of the same city. (Note: The online Dictionary of American Naval Fighting Ships states that Manatee was built by "Brown Bros. Shipyard, Tottenville, Staten Island, N.Y.", evidently confusing the designer, Samuel H. Brown, with A. C. Brown & Sons shipyard of Tottenville.) Percival sold the boat to J.B. Fallon in Fall of 1916. The U.S. Navy acquired her for World War I service from her owner, J. B. Fallon, on 21 April 1917, and commissioned her as patrol boat USS Manatee (SP-51) on 23 April 1917.

Manatee was assigned to "distant service" in European waters, where she supported a flying boat detachment through the end of World War I.

Records of Manatee's status after the Armistice with Germany of 11 November 1918 are lacking, but she presumably returned to the United States for decommissioning and disposal. As of 1 July 1920 her name no longer appeared on the Navy List.
