= USS Mystery (SP-16) =

Patrol vessel of the United States Navy

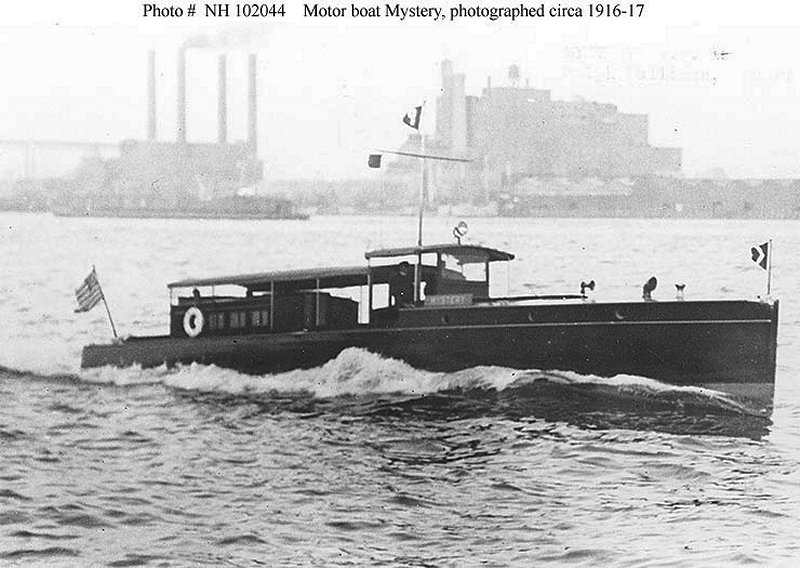
- Mystery in 1916 or 1917.

History

United States
- Name: USS Mystery (proposed)
- Namesake: Previous name retained
- Builder: Gas Engine and Power Company, Morris Heights, New York
- Completed: 1916
- Acquired: Never
- Commissioned: Never
- Notes: Registered as SP-16 for potential U.S. Navy service

General characteristics
- Type: Patrol vessel (proposed)
- Length: 58 ft 1.5 in (17.717 m)
- Propulsion: Twin engines
- Speed: 27 knots

USS Mystery (SP-16) was the proposed designation for an armed motorboat that never actually served in the United States Navy.

Mystery was a private motorboat built in 1916 by the Gas Engine and Power Company at Morris Heights, New York. The U.S. Navy inspected her in early 1917 for possible World War I service as a patrol boat in the 3rd Naval District and she was registered accordingly with the naval section patrol designation SP-16. However, the Navy never took possession of or commissioned Mystery, and she remained in civilian hands throughout the war.
