= Muskegon (YTB-763) =

Tugboat of the United States Navy

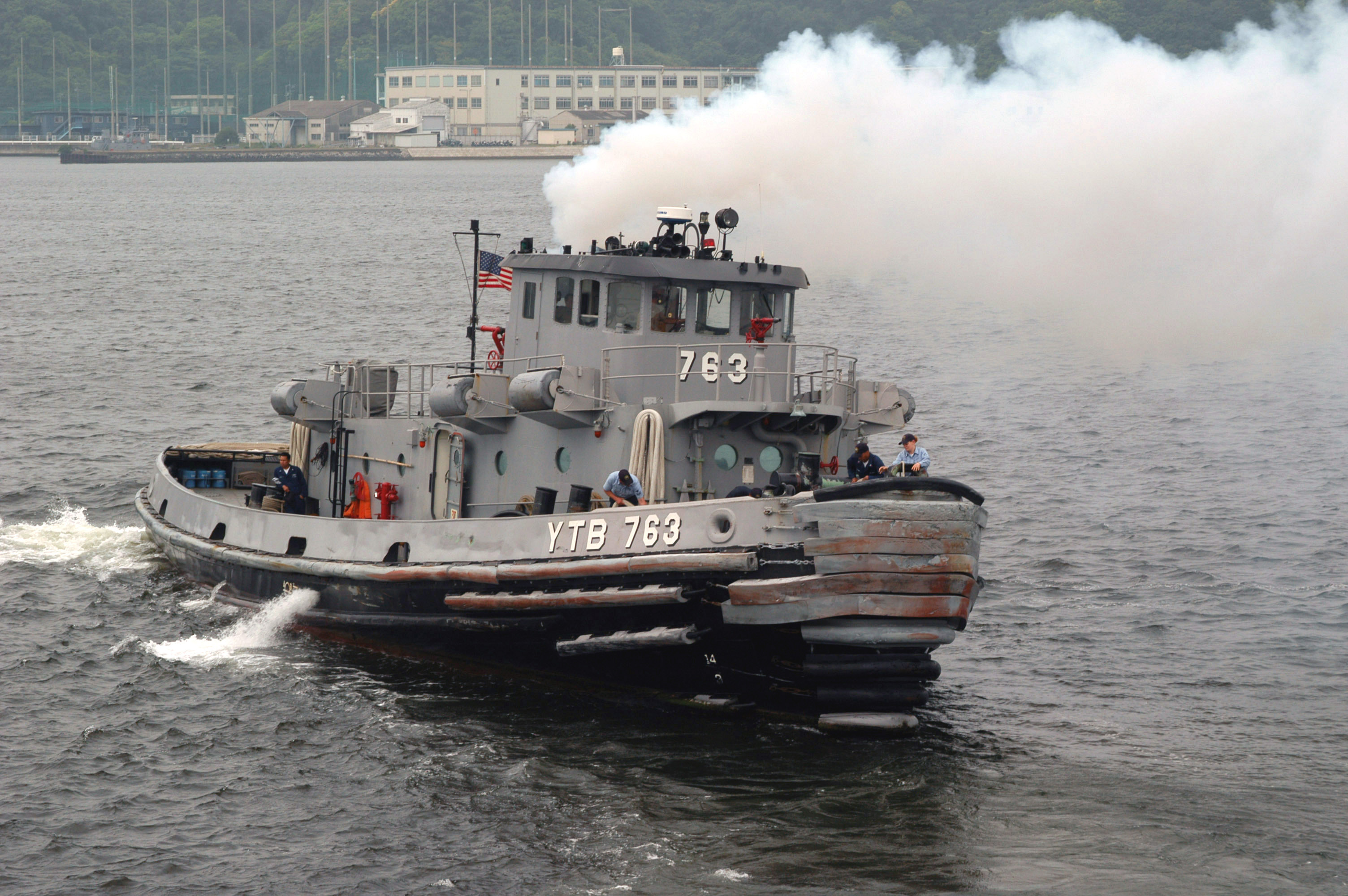
- Muskegon (YTB-763) while working alongside a ship at Commander Fleet Activities Yokosuka, Japan (CFAY), 13 May 2004

History

United States
- Awarded: 7 December 1961
- Builder: Southern Shipbuilding Corp., Slidell, LA
- Laid down: 1 February 1962
- Launched: 8 August 1962
- Completed: 19 April 1963
- In service: April 1963
- Stricken: 29 August 2012
- Fate: Sold into commercial service

General characteristics
- Class & type: Natick-class large harbor tug
- Displacement: 283 long tons (288 t) (light); 356 long tons (362 t) (full)
- Length: 109 ft (33 m)
- Beam: 31 ft (9.4 m)
- Draft: 14 ft (4.3 m)
- Propulsion: diesel, single screw
- Speed: 12 knots (14 mph; 22 km/h)
- Complement: 12

Muskegon (YTB‑763), was a United States Navy Natick-class large harbor tug. She is the second ship to be named for Muskegon, Michigan.

== Construction ==
The contract for Muskegon was awarded 7 December 1961. She was laid down on 1 February 1962 at Slidell, Louisiana, by Southern Shipbuilding Corporation and launched 8 August 1962.

== Operational history ==
Assigned as a yard tug to the 11th Naval District at San Diego, Muskegon remained there into 1969. Sometime before March 1994 Muskegon was transferred to Commander Fleet Activities Yokosuka, Japan.

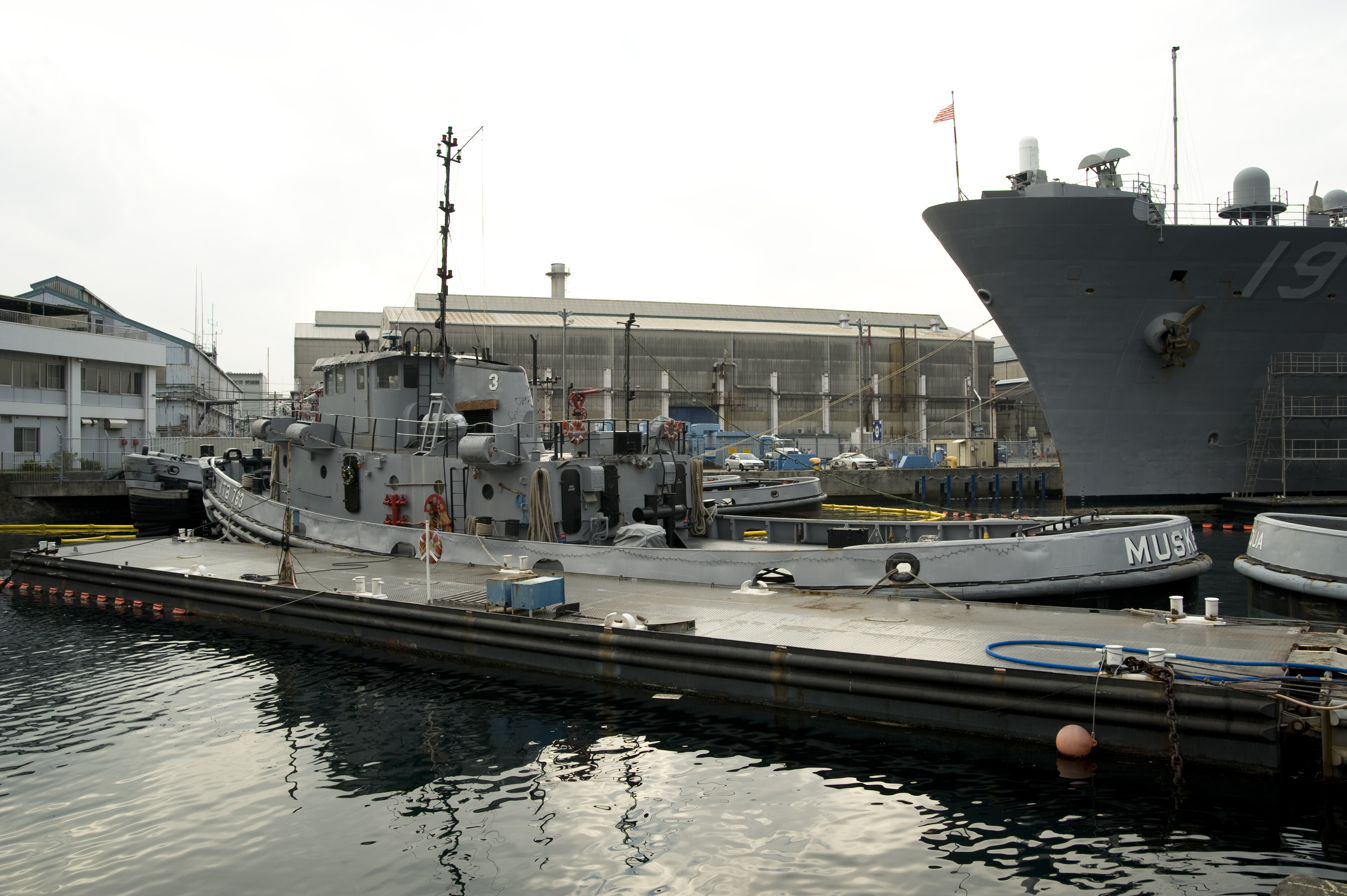
Muskegon at Yokosuka, Japan
