= USS Merito =

Patrol vessel of the United States Navy

History

United States
- Name: USS Merito
- Namesake: Previous name retained
- Builder: Swazey, Raymond and Page
- Acquired: 23 May 1917
- Commissioned: Either 1 July 1917 or 11 July 1917
- Fate: Returned to owner 19 December 1917

General characteristics
- Type: Patrol vessel
- Length: 60 ft (18 m)
- Beam: 10 ft 6 in (3.20 m)
- Draft: 3 ft 3 in (0.99 m)
- Speed: 12 knots (22 km/h; 14 mph)
- Armament: 1 × 1-pounder gun

USS Merito (SP-279) was a United States Navy patrol vessel in commission in 1917.

Merito was built by Swazey, Raymond and Page. The U.S. Navy acquired her from her owner, B. C. Dunlap of New York City, on a free lease basis on 23 May 1917 for World War I service as a patrol vessel. She was commissioned on either 1 July 1917 or 11 July 1917 as USS Merito (SP-279).

Assigned to the 3rd Naval District, Merito was employed as a section patrol boat.

Merito was returned to Dunlap on 19 December 1917.
