= USS Manistee (YT-173) =

Tugboat of the United States Navy

History

United States
- Name: USS Manistee (YT-173)
- Builder: T. S. Marvel & Co.
- Laid down: 1941
- Launched: 1941
- Completed: 1941
- Acquired: 29 May 1941
- In service: 8 August 1941
- Out of service: 30 August 1946
- Stricken: 30 August 1946

General characteristics
- Displacement: 226 long tons (230 t)
- Length: 104 ft 4 in (31.80 m)
- Beam: 28 ft 6 in (8.69 m)
- Draft: 13 ft 2 in (4.01 m)
- Speed: 13 knots (15 mph; 24 km/h)
- Complement: 12
- Armament: 2 - 30 cal. machine guns

USS Manistee (YT‑173) was a United States Navy harbor tug named for Manistee, Michigan, the first to bear the name - a Native American word meaning island in the river.

== Construction and commissioning ==
Manistee was built in 1941 as the tug Carrie T. Meseck by T. S. Marvel & Co. for Meseck Towing Lines, Inc., of New York, New York. She was purchased for $285,000 by the Navy and renamed 29 May 1941. Converted at the New York Naval Yard, Manistee was placed in service 8 August 1941.

== Operational history ==
Manistee was immediately placed in service performing tug duties in New York Harbor. There, throughout the World War II period, she helped to ensure the efficient flow of men and matériel in and out of that congested port to the war fronts in Europe and Africa.

Manistee was redesignated YTB‑173 on 15 May 1944 and continued to serve the 3rd Naval District for a year after the end of the war. On 30 August 1946 she was placed out of service at New York, and struck from the Naval Register on 13 December. Declared surplus, she was transferred to the Maritime Commission for disposal 26 February 1947. She was subsequently sold to her former owner and resumed service in New York Harbor as Carrie T. Meseck.
