= USS Mist (SP-567) =

Patrol vessel of the United States Navy

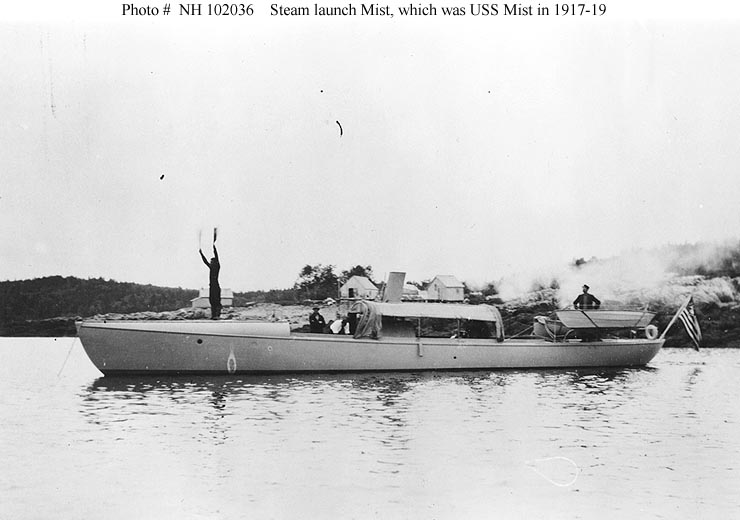
- Mist as a private steam launch sometime between 1904 and 1917.

History

United States
- Name: USS Mist
- Namesake: Previous name retained
- Builder: Herreshoff Manufacturing Company, Bristol, Rhode Island
- Completed: 1904
- Acquired: April 1917 (informally); 12 May 1917 (formally)
- Commissioned: 28 April 1917
- Fate: Returned to owner 3 February 1919
- Notes: Operated as private steam launch Mist 1904-1917 and from 1919

General characteristics
- Type: Patrol vessel
- Tonnage: 13 gross register tons
- Length: 59 ft (18 m)
- Beam: 8 ft 6 in (2.59 m)
- Draft: 2 ft 6 in (0.76 m)
- Propulsion: Steam engine
- Speed: 12 knots
- Complement: 11
- Armament: 2 × machine guns

The second USS Mist (SP-567) was a United States Navy patrol vessel in commission from 1917 to 1919.

Mist was built as a private steam launch of the same name by the Herreshoff Manufacturing Company at Bristol, Rhode Island, in 1904. In April 1917, the U.S. Navy informally acquired her from her owner, Edward Morell, for use as a section patrol vessel during World War I. She was commissioned as USS Mist (SP-567) on 28 April 1917. The formal acquisition of Mist from Morrell followed on 12 May 1917.

Assigned to the 1st Naval District in northern New England, Mist served for the rest of World War I as a dispatch boat and guard boat in the vicinity of Boston, Massachusetts. She also supported the minesweeping training activities of the Mine Sweeping Division, which operated along the coast of Massachusetts from its base at Boston Harbor.

Mist was returned to Morrell on 3 February 1919.
