= USS Mockingbird (AMc-28) =

Minesweeper of the United States Navy

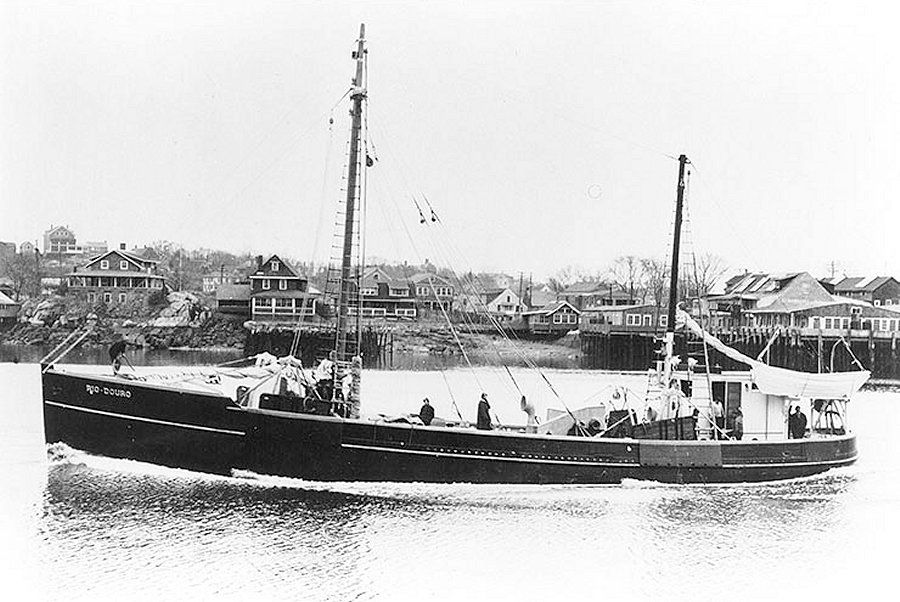

History

United States
- Name: USS Mockingbird
- Ordered: as Rio Douro
- Laid down: date unknown
- Launched: 1936
- Acquired: 30 October 1940
- Commissioned: 12 June 1941
- Decommissioned: 18 February 1944
- Stricken: 29 July 1944
- Fate: Transferred to the WSA, 23 July 1945

General characteristics
- Displacement: 205 tons
- Length: 97 ft 1 in (29.59 m)
- Beam: 20 ft 9 in (6.32 m)
- Draft: 9 ft 6 in (2.90 m)
- Propulsion: Diesel, one shaft
- Speed: 10 kts
- Complement: unknown
- Armament: six .30 cal (7.62 mm) machine guns

USS Mockingbird (AMc-28) was a coastal minesweeper acquired by the U.S. Navy for use in World War II. its task was to clear minefields in coastal waterways.

The first Navy ship to be named Mockingbird, AMc-28, a wooden dragger built in 1936 as Rio Douro by Morse Shipyards, Thomaston, Maine, was purchased by the U.S. Navy from L. C. McEwen and A. M. Pereira of Gloucester, Massachusetts, 30 October 1940; converted to a coastal minesweeper by the General Ship & Engine Works, East Boston, Massachusetts; renamed Mockingbird 14 November 1940; and placed in service at Boston 12 June 1941.

Mockingbird departed Boston 14 July 1941 for Yorktown, Virginia. Arriving there on the 18th, it underwent training at the Mine Warfare School and on 20 August reported for duty with the Experimental Mine Sweeping Group. It continued to operate in the 5th Naval District until 18 February 1944, when it was taken out of service at Norfolk, Virginia.

Struck from the Naval Register 29 July 1944, it was delivered to WSA for disposal at Little Creek, Virginia, 23 July 1945. Its subsequent status and fate are unknown.
