= USS Minneopa =

Patrol vessel of the United States Navy

History

United States
- Name: USS Minneopa
- Namesake: Previous name retained
- Completed: 1902
- Acquired: 9 October 1917
- Fate: Returned to owner 1918
- Notes: Operated as private motorboat Minneopa 1902-1917 and from 1918

General characteristics
- Type: Patrol vessel
- Length: 32 ft (9.8 m)
- Beam: 8 ft (2.4 m)
- Draft: 2 ft 7 in (0.79 m)
- Speed: 7 knots

USS Minneopa (SP-1701) was a United States Navy patrol vessel in service from 1917 to 1918.

Minneopa was built as a private motorboat of the same name in 1902. On 9 October 1917, the U.S. Navy acquired her from her owner, S. E. Patterson, for use as a section patrol boat during World War I. She was placed in service as USS Minneopa (SP-1701).

Minneopa was returned to Paterson sometime in 1918.
