= USS Mistletoe (1861) =

Tugboat of the United States Navy

History

United States
- Ordered: as Restless
- Laid down: date unknown
- Launched: 1861
- Acquired: 30 September 1862
- Commissioned: 1 October 1862
- Decommissioned: 1865
- Stricken: 1865 (est.)
- Fate: Sold, 20 November 1865

General characteristics
- Displacement: 50 tons
- Length: not known
- Beam: not known
- Draught: not known
- Propulsion: steam engine
- Speed: not known
- Complement: not known
- Armament: not known

USS Mistletoe was a steamer purchased by the Union Navy during the American Civil War. She was planned by the Union Navy for use as a tugboat whose task it was to tow other ships or to free them when they became stuck or otherwise inoperable.

Mistletoe, a small steam tug, was built as Restless at St. Louis, Missouri, in 1861; purchased by the U.S. War Department early in the Civil War for service in the Western Flotilla and renamed; transferred to the Navy at Cairo, Illinois, 30 September 1862; and commissioned 1 October 1862.

Mistletoe served as a tug at the Cairo Naval Base until joining the Mississippi Squadron downriver 7 September 1863.

After the end of the Civil War, she was sold at public auction at Mound City, Illinois, to S. Horner 20 November 1864. She was redocumented as Ella Wood 6 February 1866 and remained in merchant service until 1871.
