= Munson Steamship Line =

Defunct American steamship company

- House flag
- Founded: 1899
- Founder: Walter D. Munson
- Defunct: 1937
- Fate: Bankruptcy

The Munson Steamship Line, frequently shortened to the Munson Line, was an American steamship company that operated in the Atlantic Ocean primarily between U.S. ports and ports in the Caribbean and South America. The line was founded in 1899 as a freight line, added passenger service in 1919, and went out of business in 1937.

== History ==
The Munson Steamship Line was founded in 1899 by Walter D. Munson, who built a freight line from New York to Havana into a line that encompassed eastern Cuba, Mexico, and ports on the Gulf of Mexico and operated over 60 cargo ships, and becoming the largest ocean freight company on the Eastern Seaboard. Walter Munson was succeeded first by his son Carlos, and later by his other son, Frank Munson, shortly after the end of World War I. The 3,477 GT Munamar, built by Maryland Steel in Baltimore, became the first passenger liner and was employed on the eastern Cuba route.

In 1904, the company's headquarters moved to the Beaver Building in lower Manhattan.

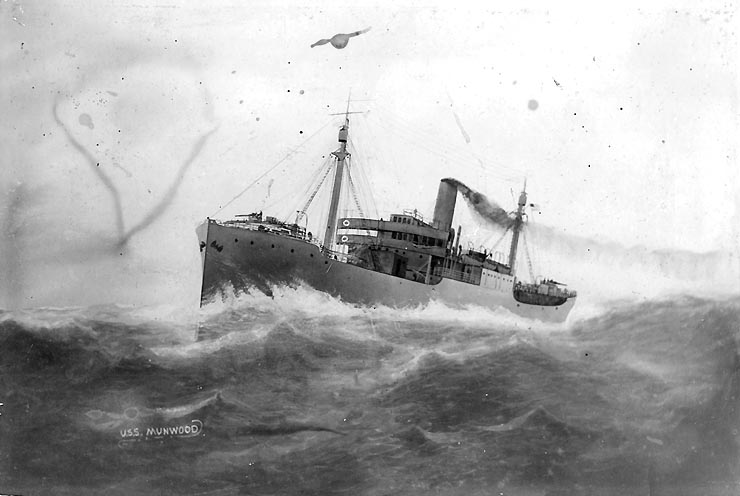
A painting of Munwood in US Navy service in 1918–19

Munson acquired a British subsidiary, the Crossburn Steamship Company, with offices in Glasgow. When Britain entered the First World War in July 1914, Crossburn owned two UK-registered ships: Mundale, registered in Swansea, and the newly-built Munwood, registered in Glasgow. Both ships were transferred to the Munson Line's direct ownership and re-registered in New York.

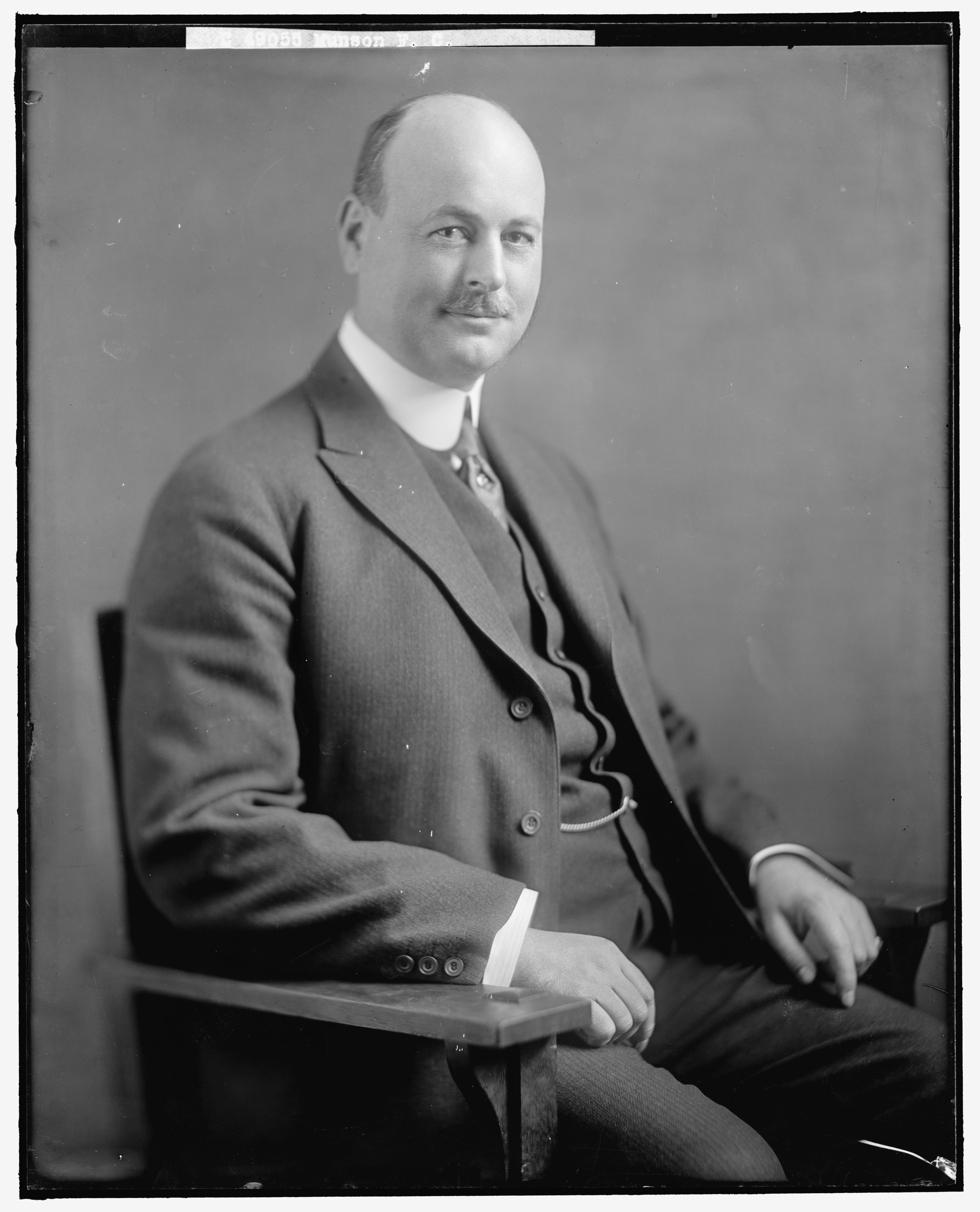
Frank Munson

Frank Munson, after securing former German steamships seized in the war, began New York–South America service with Moccasin (the former Prinz Joachim of the Hamburg America Line) in December 1919. Martha Washington, a former Austro-American Line steamship, and Huron, Aeolus and Callao, all former North German Lloyd steamships, were added to the service by the United States Shipping Board (USSB) soon after.

In May 1921, the company moved to a new headquarters building, the Munson Building at 67 Wall Street and 85-97 Beaver Street.

In July 1921, four Type 535 class ships—American Legion, Southern Cross, Pan America, and Western World—were assigned to the Munson Line by the USSB (and the former North German Lloyd ships were returned). In 1922, Martha Washington was returned to Italy after an act of Congress declared that she belonged to the Cosulich Line. Munargo, built at New York Shipbuilding of Camden, New Jersey, was added to Caribbean service in 1921.

In 1925, Munson Line bought outright the USSB ships. In 1931, Western World ran aground off the coast of Brazil, where she would remain for four months before finally arriving in New York for repairs. But the Great Depression dramatically reduced ocean traffic and the company slowly dwindled in size, laying up ships or scrapping them to save the costs of operating them.

In June 1934, Munson Steamship Line filed a petition for a reorganization under Section 77B of the Bankruptcy Act.

By 1937, the United States Maritime Commission, a successor to the USSB, had taken over the remaining ships of the troubled line when it declared bankruptcy in 1937.

== Passenger steamships ==
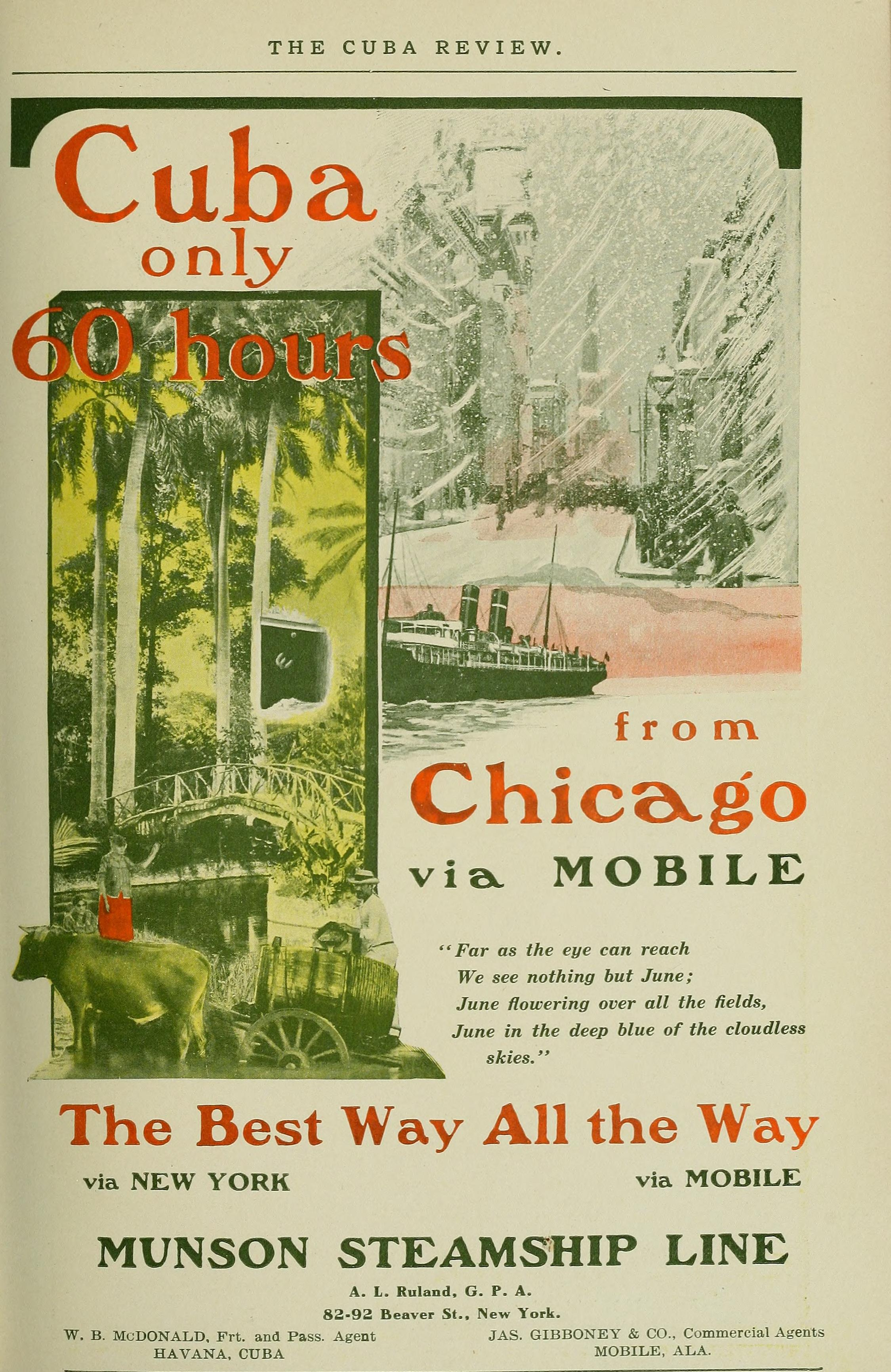
Advertising in The Cuba Review, a periodical published by the Munson Line.

This is a list of passenger vessels used by the Munson Line for Caribbean and South American routes:

- SS Aeolus
- SS Callao
- SS Huron
- SS Martha Washington
- SS Moccasin
- SS Munamar
- SS Munargo
- SS Pan America
- SS Southern Cross
- SS Western World
- SS American Legion

== Steamships owned and operated in 1929 ==
South American service:

- SS American Legion
- SS Pan America
- SS Southern Cross
- SS Western World

Cuban and/or coastwise service:

- SS Munalbro
- SS Muncove
- SS Munisla
- SS Munmotor
- SS Munsomo
- SS Rajah

Gulf–Plate service:

- SS Munarden (British flag)
- SS Muneric (British flag)
- SS Munindies
- SS Munmystic
- SS Munrio
- SS Muntropic

Intercoastal service:

- SS Munaires
- SS Munbeaver
- SS Mundelta

New York–Brazil service:

- SS Munamar
- SS Munorleans
- SS Walter D. Munson

New York–Nassau service:

- SS Munargo

Baltimore–Jacksonville, Miami and Havana service:

- SS Munlisto
- SS Munloyal

Gulf–Cuba etc. service:

- SS Fritzoe (Panamanian flag)
- SS Mundixie
- SS Mundolphin
- SS Munorway (Norwegian flag)
- SS Munplace

== Steamships owned as of February 2, 1937 ==
General passenger and freight service between New York and various ports on the east coast of South America, with calls at Trinidad enroute northward:

- SS American Legion
- SS Pan America
- SS Southern Cross
- SS Western World

General passenger and freight service between New York, Nassau, Miami and Havana:

- SS Munargo

Freight service between New Orleans and Progreso:

- SS Munplace

Carrying coal between ports on the Atlantic coast of the U.S.:

- SS Muncove
- SS Mundixie
- SS Munmotor

Status unknown:

- SS Walter D. Munson

Not in operation:

- SS Munaires
- SS Munbeaver
- SS Mundelta
- SS Munindies
- SS Munmystic
- SS Munrio
- SS Munsomo
- SS Muntropic
