= USS Leonard Wood =

American steamship and WWII troop transport

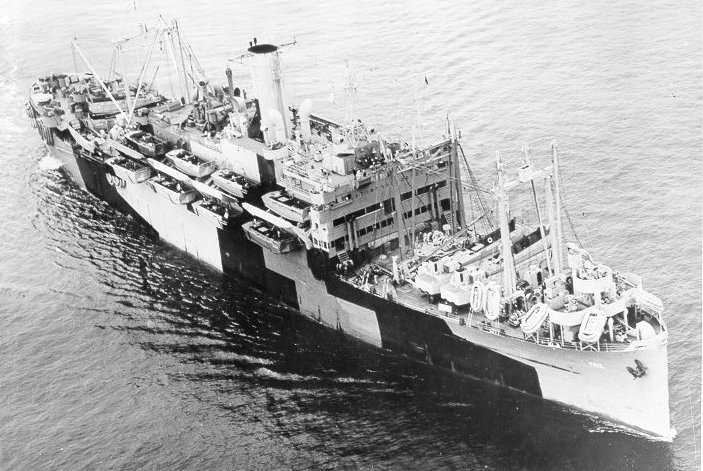
- USS Leonard Wood (APA-12) off California, 28 April 1944

History

United States
- Name: Nutmeg State; Western World; Leonard Wood
- Namesake: Leonard Wood, US Army Chief of Staff, 1910–1914
- Builder: Bethlehem Steel
- Yard number: 4197
- Laid down: 29 July 1920
- Launched: 17 September 1921
- Christened: Nutmeg State, completed as Western World
- Acquired: Delivered 9 May 1922; (by the Navy) 3 June 1941
- Commissioned: (Navy) 10 June 1941
- Decommissioned: 22 March 1946
- Renamed: Leonard Wood
- Reclassified: AP-25 to APA-12, 1 February 1943
- Stricken: 12 April 1946
- Identification: United States official number: 222063
- Honors and awards: Eight battle stars for World War II service
- Fate: Sold for scrap, 20 January 1948
- Notes: Delivery of Western World marked the end of the Emergency Fleet Corporation and United States Shipping Board's World War I shipbuilding program.

General characteristics
- Class & type: Harris-class attack transport
- Displacement: 13,529 tons (lt), 21,900 t.(fl)
- Length: 535 ft 2 in
- Beam: 72 ft 4 in
- Draft: 31 ft 3 in
- Propulsion: 2 x Curtis type turbines, 8 x Yarrow header-type boilers, 2 propellers, designed shaft horsepower 12,000.
- Speed: 17.5 knots
- Capacity: Troops: 117 Officers, 1,809 Enlisted; Cargo: 150,000 cu ft, 1,700 tons
- Complement: Officers 67, Enlisted 657
- Armament: 4 x 3"/50 caliber dual-purpose gun mounts, 2 x twin 40mm gun mounts, 16 x single 20mm gun mounts.

USS Leonard Wood (APA-12) was a Harris-class attack transport built by Bethlehem Shipbuilding Corporation and launched 17 September 1921 at Sparrows Point, Maryland as Nutmeg State, an Emergency Fleet Corporation Design 1029 ship intended as a World War I troop transport, but redesigned upon the armistice as a passenger and cargo ship and completed as Western World for delivery to the United States Shipping Board. The ship's acceptance on 5 May 1922 and delivery on 9 May 1922 marked the completion of the wartime shipbuilding program of the Emergency Fleet Corporation and the Shipping Board.

After years in commercial service on Munson Steamship Line's South American service, Western World was purchased by the War Department in 1939, converted into a transport, and renamed to serve as USAT Leonard Wood until transfer to the Navy on 3 June 1941. The ship was commissioned, classified as a transport with hull number AP-25, USS Leonard Wood with a United States Coast Guard crew on 10 June 1941. During World War II, the ship was converted into an attack transport during March 1942 and reclassified APA-12 (Harris-class). The ship was decommissioned 22 March 1946 and was sold for scrap 20 January 1948.

== Construction ==
Nutmeg State, keel laid 29 July 1920 with yard number 4197, was launched 17 September 1921 and completed as Western World in 1922 by the Bethlehem Shipbuilding Corporation at Sparrows Point, Maryland, for the United States Shipping Board (USSB). The ship was an Emergency Fleet Corporation Design 1029 type for delivery to the USSB, known in the commercial trade as "535's" for their overall length, that had been intended as troop transports, but redesigned as passenger and cargo vessels.

On her delivery voyage from Baltimore to New York, Western World covered the 413 nautical miles (475 mi; 765 km) in 22 hours for an average speed of 18.8 knots (21.6 mph; 34.8 km/h), beating the previous best time of 26 hours.

Delivery of Western World on 9 May 1922 completed the wartime shipbuilding program of the Emergency Fleet Corporation and USSB.

== Commercial service ==
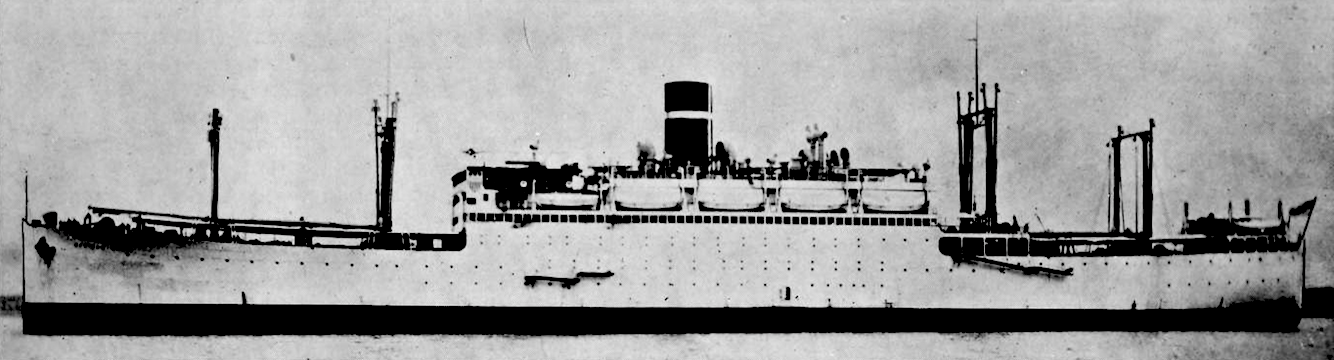
Western World in 1922

As the USSB sold off its vessels, the Munson Steamship Line bought four "535"s for its Pan America Line service in February 1926, at $1,026,000 apiece: Western World, American Legion, Pan America and Southern Cross.

Western World made her maiden voyage 17 May 1922 to Rio de Janeiro. Munson operated the four sister ships on the New York to Rio de Janeiro, Montevideo, and Buenos Aires route, with Santos, Brazil, added during return voyages.

On 8 August 1932, Western World ran aground at Porto do Boi, Brazil. She had 166 crew and 85 passengers on board at the time. The passengers were taken off by the German ship General Osorio and landed at Rio de Janeiro. She was refloated on 10 September, subsequently repaired and returned to service.

== Pre World War II ==
=== Army transport ===
Western World was purchased by the War Department in 1939 and renamed after the former Army Chief of Staff Leonard Wood serving as the USAT Leonard Wood. The ship made voyages to Cristobal, Panama, until 1940 when she was primarily in service between New York and San Francisco. Leonard Wood made occasional trips to San Juan, Puerto Rico, and one to Alaska.

=== Navy commission ===
Leonard Wood was acquired by the Navy 3 June 1941 and commissioned 10 June 1941, classified as a transport with hull number AP-25, manned by the United States Coast Guard.

=== The Preamble to Convoy WS-12X (the USA has not declared war on Japan or Germany yet) ===
The Atlantic Conference was held on 9 - 12 August 1941 in Placentia Bay, Newfoundland, between Prime Minister Winston Churchill and President Roosevelt. Besides the "official" agenda, Churchill hoped to obtain considerable assistance from the US, but the American President had his political hands tied.

On 1 September 1941, Roosevelt received an urgent and most secret message asking for US Navy troopships manned by Navy crews and escorted by U.S.N. fighting ships to carry British troops for the purpose of reinforcing the Middle East. On 4 September the US destroyer, USS Greer (DD-145), came under an unsuccessful U-boat attack. Roosevelt gave authority to the US Navy to "shoot to kill". On 5 September the President assured the British leader that six vessels would be provided to carry twenty thousand troops and would be escorted by the American Navy.

The chief of Naval Operations ordered troop ships divisions seventeen and nineteen, on 26 September 1941, to prepare their vessels for approximately six months at sea. These transports were to load to capacity with food, ammunition medical supplies, fuel and water and were to arrive at Halifax, Nova Scotia, on or about 6 November and after the arrival of a British convoy from the UK were to load twenty thousand troops. The Prime Minister mentioned in his letter that it would be for the President to say what would be required in replacement if any of these ships were to be sunk by enemy action. Agreements were worked out for the troops to be carried as supernumeraries and rations to be paid out of Lend Lease Funds and officer laundry bills were to be paid in cash. All replenishments of provisions, general stores, fuel and water would be provided by the UK. Fuel and water would be charged for the escorts to the UK in Trinidad and Cape Town only. The troops would conform to US Navy and ships regulation. Intoxicating liquors were prohibited. It was further agreed that the troops were to rig and man their own anti-aircraft guns to augment the ships batteries.

In violation of the rules of war governing neutrality, the US openly provided six American transports escorted by US warships carrying British soldiers to action against the Axis powers in the Middle East 30 days before the 7 December 1941 Japanese attack on Pearl Harbor (and subsequent 11 December 1941 German declaration of war on the USA.

==== Convoy WS-12X ====
In early November, the troopship proceeded to Halifax, Nova Scotia, to board British troops.

Wakekfield (AP-21), with 6,000 men embarked, and five other transports Mount Vernon (AP-22), West Point (AP-23), Orizaba (AP-24), Leonard Wood (AP-25) and Joseph T. Dickman (AP-26) got underway as Convoy WS12-X on 10 November 1941. Escorted by a strong screen – which, as far as Trinidad, included Ranger (CV-4) – the convoy was destined for Basra, Iraq.

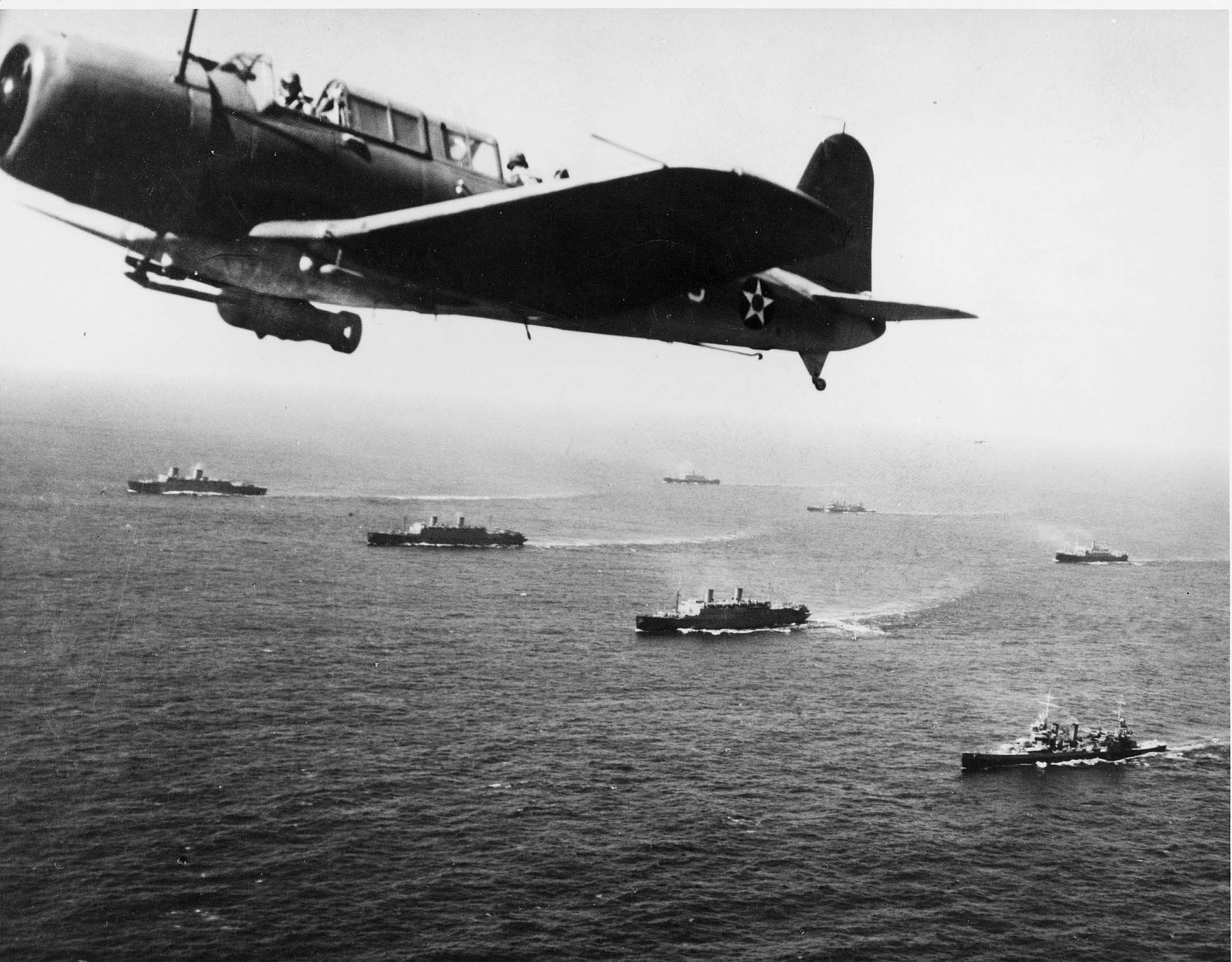
Convoy WS-12 en route to Cape Town, 1941

On 17 November 1941, the convoy reached Trinidad. All ships were replenished, and the convoy departed on 19 November 1941.

On 7 December at 2000, the convoy received a radio communication of the Japanese attack on Pearl Harbor.

== World War II Service ==
=== Convoy WS12-X ===
On 9 December, convoy WS12-X arrived in Cape Town, South Africa.

At about 0800 on 13 December 1941, the troopships departed Cape Town headed for Bombay.

At 650 on 21 December 1941, the USS Mount Vernon (AP-22) and USS Orizaba detached from the convoy headed for Bombay, bound for Mombasa. The remainder of the convoy continued to Bombay under the escort of HMS Dorsetshire, arriving on 27 December 1941.

After debarking troops at Bombay she returned, entering Philadelphia Navy Yard in March 1942 for conversion to an attack transport. She was redesignated APA-12 on 1 February 1942.

=== Invasion of North Africa (8-17 November 1942) ===
Alterations completed late in April, the attack transport trained in Chesapeake Bay for the invasion of North Africa. She departed Hampton Roads 24 October carrying almost 1,900 fighting men from the 3rd Infantry Division and slipped in close to beaches at Fedhala, French Morocco, on the night of 7 to 8 November. The next morning, she sent her boats ashore and provided gunfire support while also rescuing survivors from torpedoed sister ships.

Leonard Wood remained in the first line of transports, carrying out her mission until 12 November when enemy submarines, which had already sunk or damaged six Allied ships, forced the remaining transports to finish unloading at Casablanca. Departing 17 November, she arrived Norfolk on the 30th for repairs and more amphibious warfare training.

=== Invasion of Sicily (9 June – 17 August 1943) ===
The transport sailed 3 June 1943 and arrived Mers el Kebir, Algeria, 22 June where she prepared for the assault on Sicily. She sortied with TF 65 on 5 July and 4 days later, began unloading waves of troops in the Wood's Hole sector, some 5.5 miles west of Socglitti, Sicily. At dawn of the 10th, her gunners fired at an enemy bomber which dropped bombs 200 to 300 yards astern, and kept up an antiaircraft barrage throughout the day, helping to down three planes. With unloading completed and damaged landing craft salvaged, the ship got underway for Norfolk, Virginia, on the 12th, arriving 4 August.

=== Pacific Theatre ===
Three weeks later, she departed Norfolk for San Francisco, embarked troops, then steamed for Honolulu, arriving 27 September. Leonard Wood spent the remainder of World War II in the Pacific, during which she participated in seven amphibious landings.

==== Invasions of Gilbert and Marshall Islands (November 1943 - February 1944) ====
The first landing was a part of Operation Galvanic in which the main force was directed at Tarawa atoll, but also involved the capture of Makin atoll to develop airfields. For the Makin operation Leonard Wood, under the command of Captain Merlin O'Neill, (Note: "Marlin O'Neil" is apparently a misspelling in Dyer. USCG Historian's office has biography of Vice Admiral O'Neill who became Commandant.) USCG, was assigned to the Northern Attack Force, Task Force 52 and was the Task Unit 52.1.1. flagship of the Assault Transport Division (TRANSDIV 20) that also included Alcyone (AKA-7), Calvert (APA-32) and Pierce (APA-50). On 20 November 1943, the forces arrived off Makin with the assault transports joined by one attack cargo ship, Neville (APA-9), the landing ship dock Belle Grove (LSD-2) and three LSTs (LST-31, LST-78 and LST-179) to land 6,500 troops on Butaritari Island. The ship remained off shore, retiring far offshore at night and returning to the transport area at daylight, until 24 November when the larger transports departed for Pearl Harbor with the assault troops embarked.

In the Gilbert Islands and Marshall Islands operations, the ship gained experience, especially in cargo handling, which proved invaluable when Leonard Wood later took part in subsequent landings at Saipan, Leyte, and Lingayen Gulf.

==== Invasion of Saipan (15 June – 9 July 1944) ====
Leonard Wood departed Pearl Harbor on 29 May 1944, bound for the capture and occupation of Saipan, Marianas Islands. Arriving at Eniwetok, Marshall Islands, an atoll Leonard Wood had helped to secure just 3 months before, the ship fueled, watered, and provisioned before departing 11 June for her assigned anchorage off Saipan.

Arriving 15 June, Leonard Wood unloaded and cleared all boats in 49 minutes. For the next 9 days, the transport stood off Saipan, unloading cargo and receiving on board casualties for transfer to hospital ships. The transport sailed 24 June for Eniwetok, and then returned to Pearl Harbor on 20 July.

==== Invasion of Palaus (September - November 1944) ====
After Saipan, the ship made transport and training runs between Pearl Harbor, Eniwetok, and Guadalcanal until she sailed from Guadalcanal on 8 September for the capture and occupation of Angaur Island, Palau Island group. Arriving 7 September, the ship landed troops, and then began unloading cargo and receiving casualties. Leonard Wood completed unloading 21 September, and departed for Manus Island on 27 September.

==== Invasion of the Philippines (20 October 1944 through 2 September 1945) ====
Remaining at Manus just long enough to fuel, provision, and re-embark troops, the transport sailed on 12 October to begin the invasion of the Philippines. Arriving off the Leyte beachheads on 20 October, Leonard Wood debarked troops and cargo in record time and steamed for Palau only 10 hours later.

For the next week, Leonard Wood prepared for further operations in the Philippine Islands, departing Sansapor, New Guinea, on 30 December 1944 for the assault on Lingayen Gulf. Many Japanese suicide planes attacked the formation, and Leonard Wood helped down one of them.

Arriving at Lingayen on 9 January 1945, she again unloaded troops and cargo while firing at enemy planes before departing the same day for Leyte. Leonard Wood took part in her last amphibious landing with the Mindoro Island assault on 9 February 1945. Debarking her troops and cargo in less than 5 hours, she steamed for San Francisco via Leyte, Ulithi, and Pearl Harbor, arriving on 27 March.

After repairs at San Francisco, Leonard Wood began transport duties between the United States and the western Pacific, making two runs to Manila and one to Tokyo.

Leonard Wood earned eight battle stars for World War II service.

== Decommission ==
The ship's Coast Guard crew debarked 22 March 1946 when Leonard Wood was decommissioned and was redelivered to the Army at Seattle, Washington, pending transfer to the War Shipping Administration. The ship was sold to Consolidated Builders, Inc., for scrap 20 January 1948.

== Bibliography ==
- Charles, Roland W. (1947). Troopships of World War II (PDF). Washington: The Army Transportation Association. p. 44. LCCN 47004779. Archived from the original (PDF) on 2 April 2015.
- Dyer, George Carroll (1972). The Amphibians Came to Conquer: The Story of Admiral Richmond Kelly Turner (PDF). Fleet Marine Force Reference Publication (FMFRP 12-109-11). Vol. 2. Washington: Department of the Navy. LCCN 71603853.
- Larsson, Björn (15 November 2009). "Munson Line". Maritime Timetable Images. Björn Larsson.
- Marine Review (1922). "1921 Construction Record of U.S. Yards". The Marine Review. 52 (February). New York: 52.
- McKellar, Norman L. "Steel Shipbuilding under the U. S. Shipping Board, 1917–1921, Part III, Contract Steel Ships". Steel Shipbuilding under the U. S. Shipping Board, 1917–1921. ShipScribe. p. 140b.
- Naval History and Heritage Command. "Leonard Wood". Dictionary of American Naval Fighting Ships. Naval History and Heritage Command.
- "Bethlehem Shipbuilding Corp., Sparrows Point Plant, Sparrows Point, MD". Pacific Marine Review. 19 (May). San Francisco: J.S. Hines. 1922.
- "The Last U.S.S.B. Vessel". Pacific Marine Review. 19 (August). San Francisco: J.S. Hines: 469. 1922.
- United States Shipping Board (1926). Tenth Annual Report of the United States Shipping Board. Washington.
