= USS Munsomo =

Cargo ship of the United States Navy

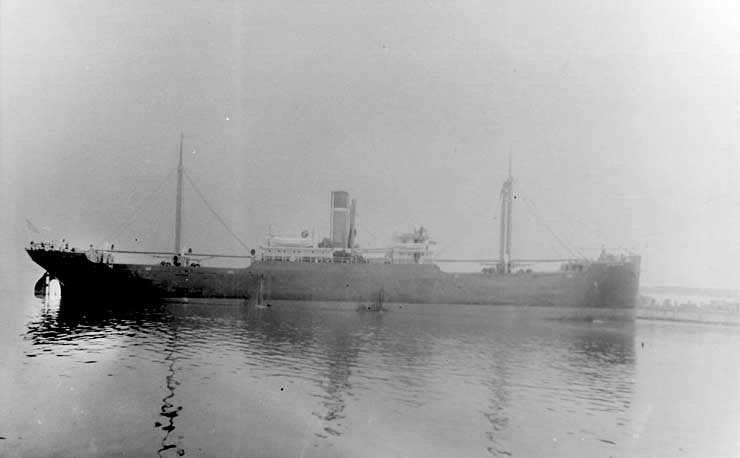
- SS Munsomo, probably around the time of her completion in 1916.

History

United States
- Name: USS Munsomo
- Namesake: Previous name retained
- Builder: Maryland Steel Company, Sparrows Point, Maryland
- Launched: 29 April 1916
- Completed: 1916
- Acquired: 28 June 1918
- Commissioned: 28 June 1918
- Decommissioned: 4 February 1919
- Fate: Transferred to United States Shipping Board 4 February 1919 for simultaneous return to owners
- Notes: In commercial service as SS Munsomo 1916–1918 and 1919–1938 and as SS Capo Orso 1938–1943; Sunk February 1943

General characteristics
- Type: Cargo ship
- Tonnage: 3,315 Gross register tons
- Displacement: 7,345 tons (normal)
- Length: 328 ft 6 in (100.13 m)
- Beam: 46 ft (14 m)
- Draft: 21 ft 6 in (6.55 m)
- Propulsion: Steam engine
- Speed: 10 knots
- Complement: 85
- Armament: 2 × 3-inch (76.2-millimeter) guns

USS Munsomo (ID-1607) was a cargo ship that served in the United States Navy from 1918 to 1919.

SS Munsomo was built as a commercial collier by the Maryland Steel Company at Sparrows Point, Maryland, in 1916, for the Munson Steamship Line. The U.S. Navy inspected her in the 3rd Naval District in 1917 for possible World War I service, and acquired her from Munson on 28 June 1918 for use as a cargo ship. Assigned the naval registry Identification Number (Id. No.) 1607, she was commissioned as USS Munsomo at Baltimore, Maryland, the same day.

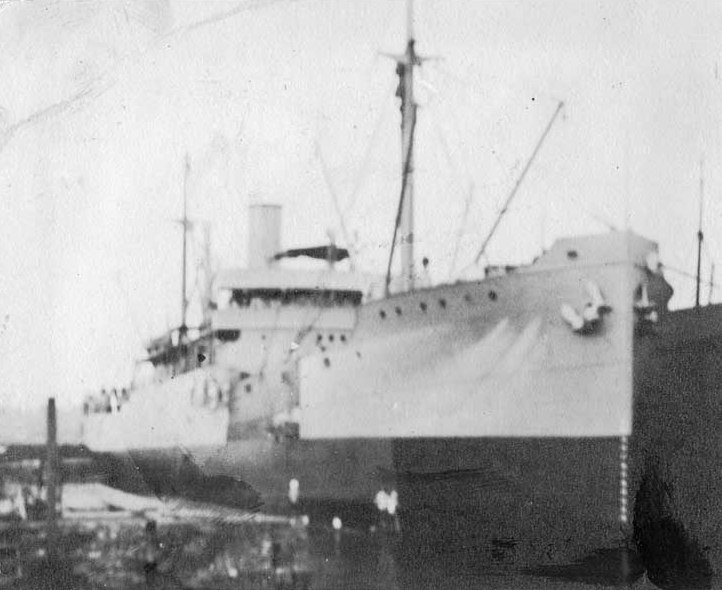
SS Munsomo probably around the time of her 1917 inspection in the 3rd Naval District for possible U.S. Navy service.

Assigned to the Naval Overseas Transportation Service, Munsomo took on a cargo of United States Army supplies and departed New York City on 9 August 1918 to cross the Atlantic in a convoy, bound for France. She reached Nantes, France, on 29 August 1918. After discharging her cargo she moved on to Le Verdon-sur-Mer, France, then returned to the United States, arriving at Baltimore on 25 September 1918.

On 16 October 1918, Munsomo departed with a mixed cargo for a second transatlantic crossing in convoy, reaching Brest, France, on 2 November 1918. She proceeded to Nantes to ballast, then returned to the United States, arriving at Newport News, Virginia, on 29 November 1918.

Munsomo next made a run to Antilla, Cuba, carrying general supplies and returned to the United States with a cargo of sugar, arriving at New York City.

Munsomo was decommissioned on 4 February 1919 and transferred to the United States Shipping Board the same day for simultaneous return to Munson Steamship Line.

She returned to mercantile service as SS Munsomo. In 1938, she was sold to Italian interests and renamed SS Capo Orso. Capo Orso was sunk during World War II by a torpedo dropped by a torpedo plane.
