= USS Mundelta =

Cargo ship of the United States Navy

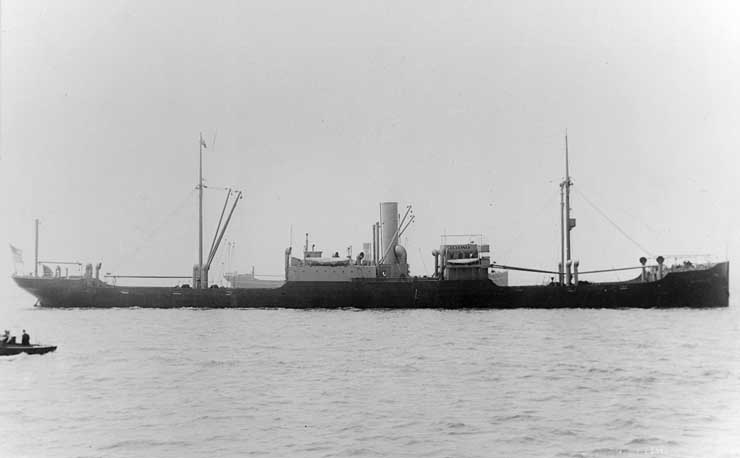
- SS Mundelta at Newport News, Virginia, probably at the time of her completion in 1917.

History

United States
- Name: USS Mundelta
- Namesake: Previous name retained
- Builder: Newport News Shipbuilding and Drydock Company, Newport News, Virginia
- Launched: 15 March 1917
- Completed: 1917
- Acquired: 20 April 1918
- Commissioned: 20 April 1918 or 27 April 1918
- Decommissioned: 11 February 1919
- Fate: Transferred to United States Shipping Board 11 February 1919; Returned to owners 11 February 1919; Torpedoed and sunk in Japanese service 21 September 1944
- Notes: Served as American commercial cargo ship SS Mundelta 1917 and 1919–1937, as British commercial cargo ship SS Munlock 1937–1941, and as Japanese commercial cargo ship Rizan Maru 1941–1944

General characteristics
- Class & type: Mundelta-class cargo ship
- Tonnage: 5,288 Gross register tons
- Displacement: 10,675 tons
- Length: 385 ft (117 m)
- Beam: 53 ft (16 m)
- Draft: 24 ft 1 in (7.34 m)
- Propulsion: Steam engine
- Speed: 11.5 knots
- Complement: 79
- Armament: 2 × 4-inch (102-millimeter) guns

USS Mundelta (ID-1301) was a cargo ship that served in the United States Navy from 1918 to 1919.

Mundelta was built as the commercial cargo ship SS Mundelta in 1917 at Newport News, Virginia, by Newport News Shipbuilding and Drydock Company for the Munson Steamship Line of New York City. She was delivered to the Munson Steamship Line on 18 April 1918, but the U.S. Navy acquired her for World War I service from Munson on 20 April 1918. Assigned Identification Number (Id. No.) 1301, she was commissioned at New York City on 20 April 1918 or 27 April 1918 as USS Mundelta.

Assigned to the Naval Overseas Transportation Service, Mundelta departed New York City in convoy on 8 May 1918, docking at Le Havre, France, on 20 May 1918 to debark United States Army supplies. On 20 June 1918 she steamed for New York. At New York she loaded mixed cargo for the first of three transatlantic voyages to Bordeaux, France, the last of which she completed at New York on 26 December 1918. In January 1919 she took a load of coal from Norfolk, Virginia, to Havana, Cuba. She then moved to Mobile, Alabama, and finally to New Orleans, Louisiana.

At New Orleans on 11 February 1919, Mundelta simultaneously was decommissioned, transferred to the United States Shipping Board, and returned to the Munson Steamship Line.

Once again SS Mundelta, she operated for the Munson Steamship Line in commercial service until 1937, when she was sold to a British firm at Shanghai, China, and renamed SS Munlock. Seized by Japan in China at the beginning of World War II in December 1941, she was placed in Japanese service as Rizan Maru. The U.S. Navy submarine USS Searaven (SS-196) torpedoed and sank Rizan Maru in the North Pacific Ocean on 21 September 1944.
