= USS Munaires =

Cargo ship of the United States Navy

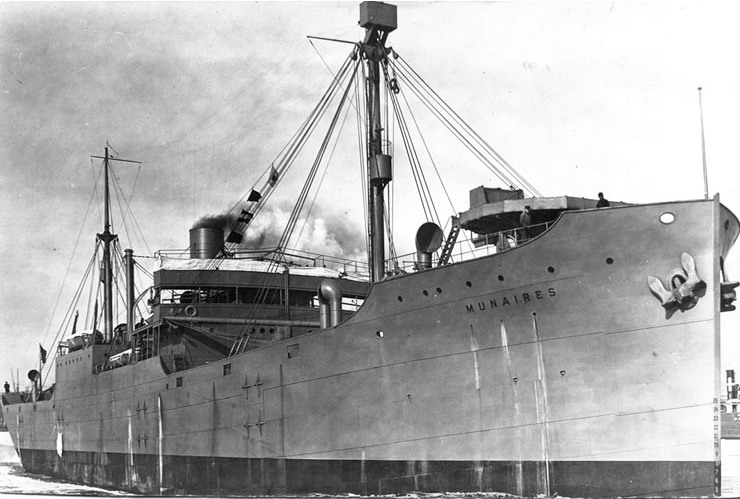
- SS Munaires in a photograph possibly taken on 7 January 1918 at the time of her inspection for possible naval service by the 5th Naval District.

History

United States
- Name: USS Munaires
- Namesake: Previous name retained
- Builder: Newport News Shipbuilding and Drydock Company, Newport News, Virginia
- Launched: 17 November 1917
- Completed: 5 January 1918
- Acquired: 14 January 1918
- Commissioned: 14 January 1918
- Decommissioned: 6 April 1919
- Fate: Transferred to United States Shipping Board 25 April 1919 for return to owners
- Notes: Served as American commercial cargo ship SS Munaires 1919–1942; Torpedoed and sunk 28 September 1942

General characteristics
- Class & type: Mundelta-class cargo ship
- Tonnage: 5,095 Gross register tons
- Displacement: 10,400 tons (normal)
- Length: 385 ft (117 m)
- Beam: 53 ft (16 m)
- Draft: 24 ft (7.3 m)
- Propulsion: Steam engine
- Speed: 10.5 knots
- Complement: 86
- Armament: 1 × 6-inch (152-millimeter) gun; 1 × 3-inch (76.2-millimeter) gun

USS Munaires (ID-2197) was a cargo ship that served in the United States Navy from 1918 to 1919.

SS Munaires was built as a commercial cargo ship at Newport News, Virginia, by Newport News Shipbuilding and Drydock Company for the Munson Steamship Line of New York City. She was delivered to the Munson Steamship Line on 5 January 1918, but the United States Shipping Board acquired her from Munson on 10 January 1918 for World War I service. On 14 January 1918, the Shipping Board transferred her to the U.S. Navy, which assigned her the naval registry Identification Number (Id. No.) 2197 and commissioned her the same day as USS Munaires.

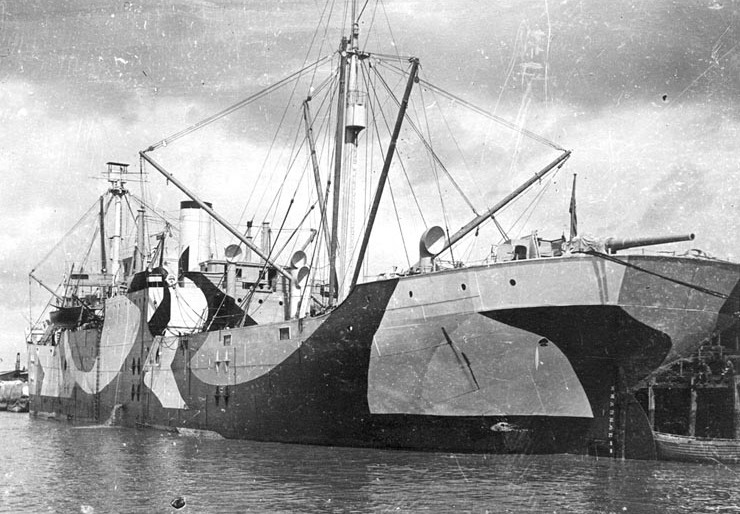
USS Munaires at the American Basins at Bordeaux, France, on 2 October 1918.

Assigned to the Naval Overseas Transportation Service, Munaires departed New York City on 27 January 1918 in convoy for Europe, arriving at Bordeaux, France, on 17 February 1918 to discharge her cargo of United States Army supplies. Clearing Gironde, France, on 24 April 1918, she returned to the United States East Coast, arriving at New York City on 7 May 1918.

Munaires made four more round-trip runs to French ports with U.S. Army materials, mostly corn and blankets, the last of these voyages ending at New York City on 20 December 1918.

On 7 January 1919, Munaires got underway for South America, stopping along the way at Hampton Roads, Virginia, to load coal. Arriving at La Plata, Argentina, on 12 February 1919, she unloaded her cargo and steamed back to New York City, which she reached on 4 April 1919. On 6 April 1919 Munaires was decommissioned. The Navy transferred her to the United States Shipping Board on 25 April 1919 for return to the Munson Steamship Line.

Once again SS Munaires, she operated for the Munson Steamship Line in commercial service until she was torpedoed and sunk during World War II on 28 September 1942.
