= USS Chateau Thierry =

American troop transport ship

History

United States
- Name: Chateau Thierry
- Namesake: Château-Thierry, France
- Builder: American International Shipbuilding
- Cost: ~$2,000,000
- Yard number: 678
- Laid down: 25 January 1919 as Skanamania
- Launched: 24 December 1919
- Completed: June 1920
- Acquired: By the Army: 1921; By the Navy: 15 July 1941
- Commissioned: Army: 1921 - 1941; Navy: 6 Aug 1941 - 9 Sep 1943 1940; Army: 5 Mar 1944- 1946?
- Honors and awards: One battle star for World War II service
- Fate: Sold for scrapping, 17 June 1957, to Ziedell Explorations Inc., Portland, OR.

General characteristics
- Type: Design 1024 ship
- Displacement: 9,050 tons (lt)
- Length: 448 ft
- Beam: 58 ft
- Draft: 28 ft
- Propulsion: Steam turbine
- Speed: 15 knots
- Complement: 253
- Armament: (WWII) 1 x 5"/38 caliber dual purpose gun, 4 x 3"/50 caliber dp guns, 8 x 0.5 in (12.7 mm) machine guns

Chateau Thierry was a troop transport that served with the US Army and US Navy. Originally built for service during the First World War, the ship arrived too late to see service in that war, but operated as an army transport, USAT Chateau Thierry, between the wars. With America's entry into World War II, the vessel was transferred to the US Navy and redesignated USS Chateau Thierry (AP-31). In 1943 she was transferred back to the Army and converted into a hospital ship, USAHS Chateau Thierry, in which role she was to serve for the remainder of the war.

Chateau Thierry was built in 1921 by the American International Shipbuilding Corporation at Hog Island, Pennsylvania. She was transferred from the Army to the Navy 15 July 1941, and commissioned into the latter 6 August 1941.

== Prewar Army service ==
Chateau Thierry played a part in the assumption by the United States of responsibilities in the western Atlantic in the period before entrance into World War II as she carried Army and civilian personnel and cargo from Brooklyn, New York, to ports in Greenland, Iceland, and Nova Scotia, between 13 September 1941 and 2 January 1942.

The ship's first captain, Jerry Allen, sailed her maiden voyage as a U.S. Army Transport from Baltimore to Manila in 1921. He captained the Chateau Thierry on a number or trips from the east coast to Pacific ports. One started in 1925 in Manila, stopped in San Francisco, traversed the Panama Canal and docked in New York.

War Department plans to establish bases in Greenland, known by the code name "Bluie" were at risk when Navy notified Army that ships could not be spared ships for a required two month layover. The recently acquired Munargo being transferred to Navy for that purpose and addition of Chateau Thierry was the solution. The Army's Greenland force had been scheduled to depart 19 May 1941 but repairs were required for Munargo delayed departure until 19 June when Chateau Thierry and Munargo with 469 officers and men of the force departed New York bound for Argentia, Newfoundland where they would refuel and await news of ice conditions. The ships departed Argentia 30 June and arrived off Narsarssuak, Greenland to establish Bluie West One as the major Army and Navy base in Greenland.

== World War II ==
On 15 July 1941 Chateau Thierry was transferred from Army to Navy and continued operations between Brooklyn and outposts in Greenland, Iceland, and Nova Scotia during September 1941 and 2 January 1942.

With the entry of the United States into the war, she sailed from Brooklyn 15 January 1942 carrying some of the first American troops to cross to Northern Ireland. Chateau Thierry sailed on to Scotland to embark British troops and sailors for transportation to Halifax and New York City. Two more voyages with soldiers from New York to Argentia, Newfoundland, followed, and on 19 May, she got underway for Charleston, South Carolina, to embark Army and civilian passengers. She sailed on by way of Bermuda for a round of calls at African ports, sailing south around Cape of Good Hope for Eritrea, where she landed the last of her passengers and took a new group on board. On her return passage she picked up Navy gun crews and other survivors of two merchant ship sinkings, at west African ports.

=== Invasion of Sicily ===
Chateau Thierry resumed her transport duty to the North Atlantic until 29 April 1943, when she cleared New York for a voyage to North Africa, well escorted in a safe passage. Returning to New York, she embarked soldiers and sailors, and cleared 10 June for Oran, arriving 21 June. Here she prepared for the invasion of Sicily, for which she sailed 5 July. Assigned to the floating reserve, Chateau Thierry lay off the hotly contested Gela beaches 10 July as the assault began, and late in the day began landing her reinforcements, continuing into the night. She remained off Sicily for 2 days, firing to aid in turning back the heavy German air attacks, and taking on board Italian prisoners of war.

Returning to Bizerte 13 July she landed the Italians, then returned to Sicily to embark members of naval units not needed ashore now that the landings had succeeded. Laden with German prisoners of war at Oran, Chateau Thierry sailed 9 August for New York which she reached 22 August.

=== Conversion to hospital ship ===
Sailing on to Boston, she was decommissioned there 9 September 1943, and returned to the Army who used her as a hospital ship for the remainder of the war. Chateau Thierry was one of the 12 hospital ships that were involved in the Invasion of southern France. The ship was also in North Africa, Sicily and Italy at Anzio.

== Awards ==
Chateau Thierry received one battle star for World War II service.
