= SS Munargo =

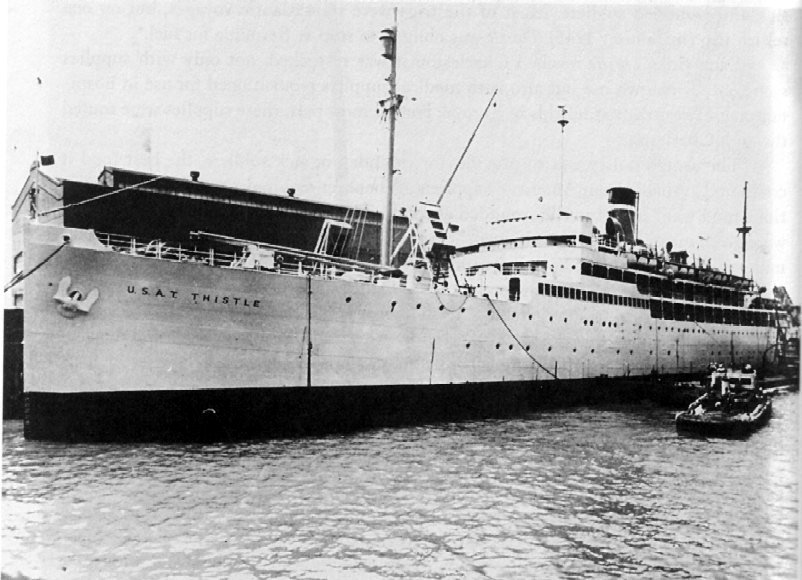

History

United States
- Name: Munargo; Thistle
- Laid down: 30 September 1920
- Launched: 17 September 1921
- Acquired: 31 December 1921
- Out of service: March 1946
- Identification: Official number: 221839
- Fate: Scrapped in 1957

General characteristics
- Tonnage: 6,484 GRT as Munargo; 7,822 GRT as Thistle
- Displacement: 7,100 tons
- Length: 413 ft 8 in (126.09 m); 432 ft (132 m)
- Beam: 57 ft 8 in (17.58 m); 57 ft 6 in (17.53 m)
- Draft: 23 ft 8 in (7.21 m); 23 ft 7 in (7.19 m)
- Propulsion: steam turbine, single propeller, 5,800shp
- Speed: 16 kts
- Complement: Navy: 254
- Armament: Navy service only: one single 5 in (130 mm) dual purpose gun mount, four 3 in (76 mm) guns, eight 0.5 in (12.7 mm) machine guns

SS Munargo was a commercial cargo and passenger ship built for the Munson Steamship Line by New York Shipbuilding Corp., Camden, New Jersey launched 17 September 1921. Munargo operated for the line in the New York-Bahamas-Cuba-Miami service passenger cargo trade. In June 1930 the United States and Mexican soccer teams took passage aboard Munargo from New York to Uruguay for the 1930 FIFA World Cup. The ship was acquired by the War Shipping Administration and immediately purchased by the War Department for service as a troop carrier during World War II. Shortly after acquisition the War Department transferred the ship to the U.S. Navy which commissioned the ship USS Munargo (AP-20). She operated in the Atlantic Ocean for the Navy until returned to the War Department in 1943 for conversion into the Hospital ship USAHS Thistle.

== Construction and prewar service (1921–1941) ==
Munargo keel laying was on 30 September 1920 with launched on 17 September 1921 and delivered on 31 December 1921 by New York Shipbuilding Corp., Camden, New Jersey to the Munson Steamship Line. The ship's specifications were a length of 413 ft 8 in (126.09 m), beam of 57 ft 8 in (17.58 m) and draft of 23 ft 8 in (7.21 m) and tonnage of 6,484 GRT.

The ship arrived in New York from the yards with Frank C. Munson, president of the line, and notable guests that included the Consuls General of Cuba and Great Britain at New York in time for a New Year's Eve party aboard. Munagro was set for her first commercial voyage on 7 January 1922 with accommodations for 297 passengers with all outside staterooms, an open verandah lounge and an 11,000 mile cruising range with plans to alternate the New York-Bahamas-Cuba-Miami service with the line's other ship Munamar.

On 17 November 1933 Munargo had completed the discharge of passengers and some cargo at Pier 64 North River, New York, was proceeding to discharge the remaining cargo in Erie Basin using the main channel south to Governor's Island and Deutschland inbound from Hamburg collided while passing at 5:42 p. m. Green Flashing buoy 31. Deutschland struck Munargo slightly forward of midship on the port side penetrating about 5 feet (1.5 m) in the bottom plates and about 12 feet (3.7 m) at the upper deck. Munargo had changed course, crossing Deutschland and was found solely at fault, sustained on appeal.

Munson went bankrupt in 1938 with the ship transferring to the Munargo Steamship Company operating from 1928 through 1940 between New York, Nassau, Miami and Havana. In June 1930 the ship took the Mexican and United States teams to the 1930 FIFA World Cup in Uruguay in an eighteen-day voyage from New York with stops at Rio de Janeiro and Santos, Brazil.

== Government service (1941–1946) ==
On 27 March 1941 Munargo, by then managed by the United Fruit Company, was delivered by the Munargo Steamship Company to the War Shipping Administration for War Department purchase at Pier #4, Army Base Brooklyn which was the core of the reconstituted New York Port of Embarkation. War Department plans to establish bases in Greenland, known by the code name "Bluie" were at risk when Navy notified Army that ships could not be spared ships for a required two month layover. The recently acquired Munargo being transferred to Navy for that purpose was the solution.

=== Navy service (1941–1943) ===
The Army transferred Munargo to the Navy on 6 June 1941 which commissioned her as USS Munargo on 4 June 1941. The Army's Greenland force had been scheduled to depart 19 May 1941 but repairs were required for Munargo delayed departure until 19 June when Munargo and USAT Chateau Thierry with 469 officers and men of the force departed New York bound for Argentia, Newfoundland where they would refuel and await news of ice conditions. The ships departed Argentia 30 June and arrived off Narsarssuak, Greenland to establish Bluie West One as the major Army and Navy base in Greenland.

Following conversion at Brooklyn, New York, Munargo was attached to the Naval Transportation Service at Brooklyn in December 1941. On 16 December she embarked troops and sailed to Bermuda, arriving St. George’s Harbor 2 days later. She departed 19 December for San Juan, Puerto Rico, with troops and civilian passengers, and thence steamed to Trinidad to take aboard suspected German agents for transportation to New York, arriving 5 January 1942.

For the first 3-1/2 months of 1942, Munargo carried troops between New York and Reykjavík, Iceland. On 17 April she embarked British troops on Iceland, then carried them to Gourock, Scotland. On 31 May the ship was one of three, the other being Thomas H. Barry and Siboney departing New York engaged in experimental "double bunking" in which many troops shared a bunk and got two meals a day with mess facilities operating nearly 24 hours a day in order to maximize troop build up in Britain. After another voyage involving British troops, she returned to Boston, Massachusetts, 27 June to disembark British officers, then spent 4 months In New York.

Munargo left New York 30 December with troops, cargo, and U.S. currency for Trinidad and Brazil, from which she sailed through the Panama Canal to San Francisco, California, arriving 18 March 1943. On 17 May she reached Noumea, New Caledonia with troops, returning to California to reload, and once again arriving in Noumea 18 July. She sailed almost at once for Samoa, Hawaii, Guantánamo Bay, and the U.S. East Coast Munargo decommissioned at Brooklyn 18 October 1943, and was returned to the War Department.

=== Army service (1943–1946) ===
==== Hospital ship ====
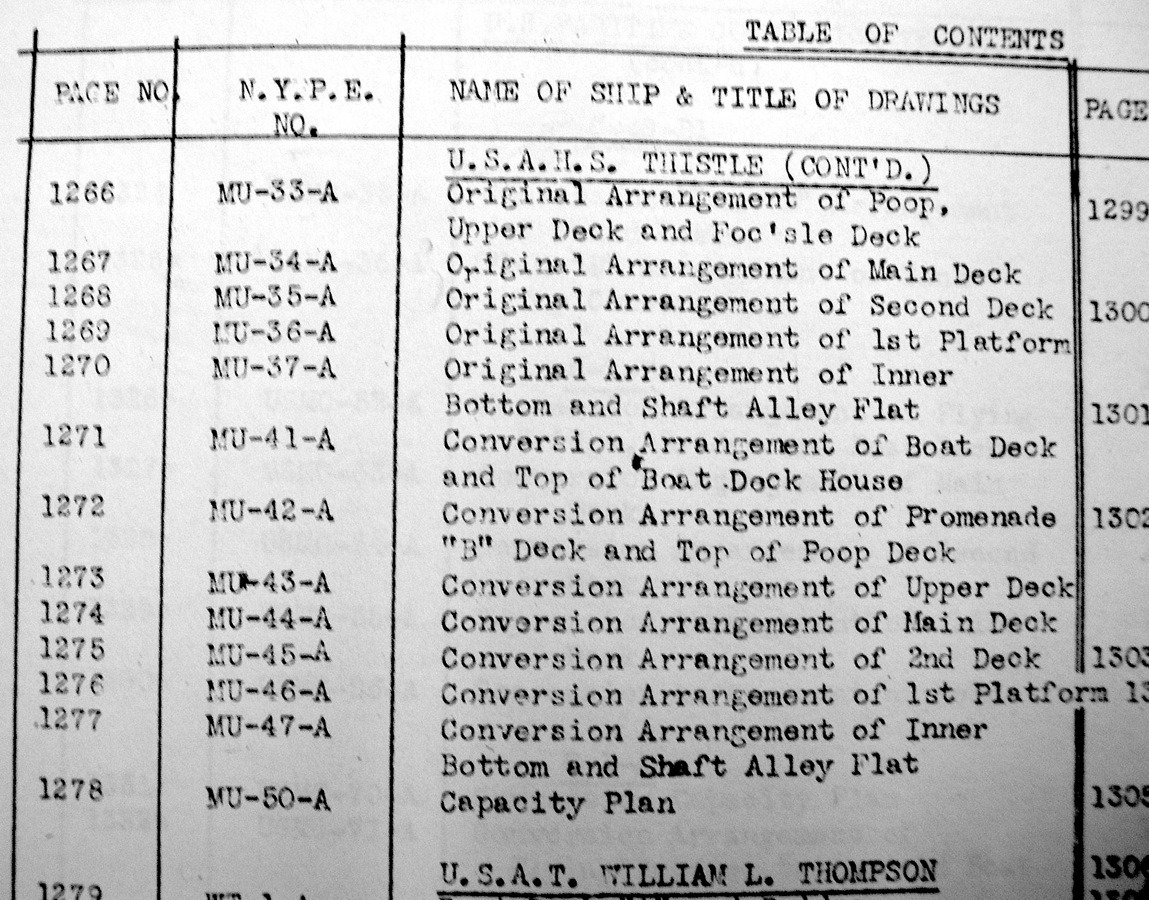
Partial index of NYPOE ship conversion plans for USAHS Thistle.

The Army had been hesitant to withdraw troop carrying capacity for conversion into designated, Convention protected hospital ships but in June 1943, under pressure of and experience with the North African campaign the Surgeon General and Joint Chiefs of Staff decided protected hospital ships would be the normal means of evacuation for "helpless patients" from forward area hospitals. These ships would not be "floating hospitals" for initial treatment as were the Navy hospital ships but transports to clear forward area Army hospitals to rear areas or the United States and that smaller, slower troop ships would be selected and converted as soon as replacement through new construction was available.

Under supervision of the Maintenance and Repair Branch of the Water Division at the New York Port of Embarkation converted Munargo to a hospital ship with the new name Thistle with a patient capacity of 455 making her first voyage to North Africa on 8 April 1944. Operating from Charleston, South Carolina, she made nine voyages of mercy to the Mediterranean. One arrival in New York harbor occurred 2 July 1945. Ordered to the Pacific Ocean in September 1945, she called at Leyte and returned to the west coast in December. She was decommissioned as a hospital ship in March 1946.

==== Army transport ====
Immediate postwar pressure was brought to transport war brides, including infants, and military dependents whose transportation had been suspended for the duration of the war. The available ships were still in wartime condition and largely unsuitable for civilian, particularly children, passengers. Pressure to transport dependents reached Congressional level and in response, though Congress withdrew a resolution forcing Army to comply, about 30 vessels, the majority Army troop or hospital ships were designated for partial conversion to more suitable transports, including provision of "Cribs, high chairs, play pens, and baby baths" and special laundry facilities.

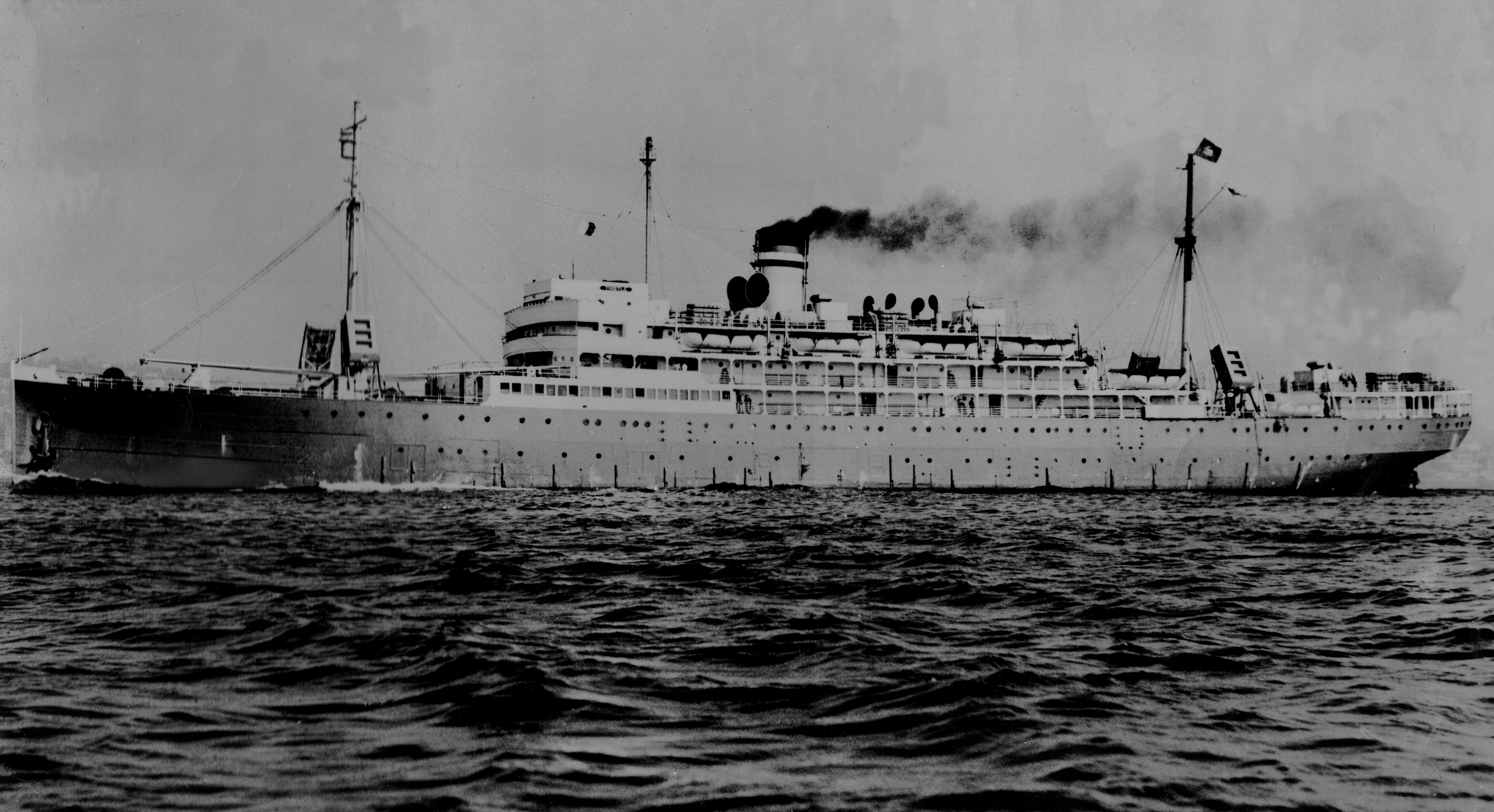
USAT Thistle in 1948, Seattle to Yokohama, Japan. Scan from album of Elizabeth Terry, a Department of Army Civilian aboard from February 10 through the 26th of 1948.

Thistle was redesignated as a United States Army Transport, repainted from Convention hospital ship white and as USAT Thistle engaged in relocating Army dependents and personnel until lay up in 1948. The ship was active in this role when on 17 January 1948 USAT Thistle was reported in Pacific Stars and Stripes as having arrived that morning in Yokohama with "220 dependents, 38 enlisted men, three officers, 11 school teachers and ten DACs" (Department of Army Civilians) after a seventeen-day voyage from Seattle.

She transported Army Air Force men and dependents to be stationed in Alaska. One of the last trips the Thistle took was from Seattle, Washington USA to Yokohama, Japan.

== Lay up and scrapping ==
Thistle was declared surplus by the Army, returned to the Maritime Commission and laid up in the National Defense Reserve Fleet, Astoria, Oregon 1 November 1948. On 19 February 1957 the vessel was sold to the Learner Company for $216,000 and delivered for scrapping 13 March 1957.

== Bibliography ==
- Almeida, Rony J. (2006). Where the Legend Began. ISBN 9781411681101.
- Circuit Court of Appeals, Second Circuit (June 7, 1937). "THE S. S. DEUTSCHLAND. THE S. S. MUNARGO". 90 F.2d 454 (1937). Leagle, Inc.
- Colton, T. (March 17, 2014). "New York Shipbuilding, Camden NJ". Shipbuilding History. T. Colton. Archived from the original on 1 October 2015.
- Bykofsky, Joseph; Larson, Harold (1990). The Technical Services—The Transportation Corps: Operations Overseas. United States Army In World War II. Washington, DC: Center Of Military History, United States Army. LCCN 56060000.
- Conn, Stetson; Engelman, Rose C.; Fairchild, Byron (1964). The Western Hemisphere—Guarding The United States And Its Outposts. United States Army In World War II. Washington, DC: Center Of Military History, United States Army. LCCN 62060067.
- Lloyds (1931). "Lloyd's Register (1930-31)" (PDF). Lloyd's Register (through PlimsollShipData).
- Lloyds (1931). "Lloyd's Register (1941–42)" (PDF). Lloyd's Register (through PlimsollShipData).
- Marine Journal (January 7, 1922). "New Year Greets Latest Addition to American Merchant Marine—S.S. Munargo". The Marine Journal. 44 (January).
- Maritime Administration. "Munargo". Ship History Database Vessel Status Card. U.S. Department of Transportation, Maritime Administration. Archived from the original on November 2, 2014.
- National Park Service, San Francisco Maritime National Historical Park (August 2007). "Catalog record: Munargo trim and stability booklet, 1939, 1941, bulk 1939" (PDF). National Park Service. Archived from the original (PDF) on May 11, 2009.
- Naval History And Heritage Command. "Munargo". Dictionary of American Naval Fighting Ships. Naval History And Heritage Command. Archived from the original on March 29, 2004.
- NavSource (12 July 2013). "USAT Thistle". NavSource.
- Pacific Marine Review (1921). "New York Shipbuilding Corporation, Camden, N.J." Pacific Marine Review. 18 (11). Pacific American Steamship Association / Shipowners' Association of the Pacific Coast.
- Pacific Stars and Stripes (January 18, 1948). "Shipping News". Pacific Stars and Stripes.
- Wardlow, Chester (1999). The Technical Services—The Transportation Corps: Responsibilities, Organization, And Operations. United States Army In World War II. Washington, DC: Center Of Military History, United States Army. LCCN 99490905. Archived from the original on October 31, 2011.
- Wardlow, Chester (1956). The Technical Services—The Transportation Corps: Movements, Training, And Supply. United States Army In World War II. Washington, DC: Center Of Military History, United States Army. LCCN 55060003.
