= USS Hunter Liggett =

Early-to-mid 20th century ship

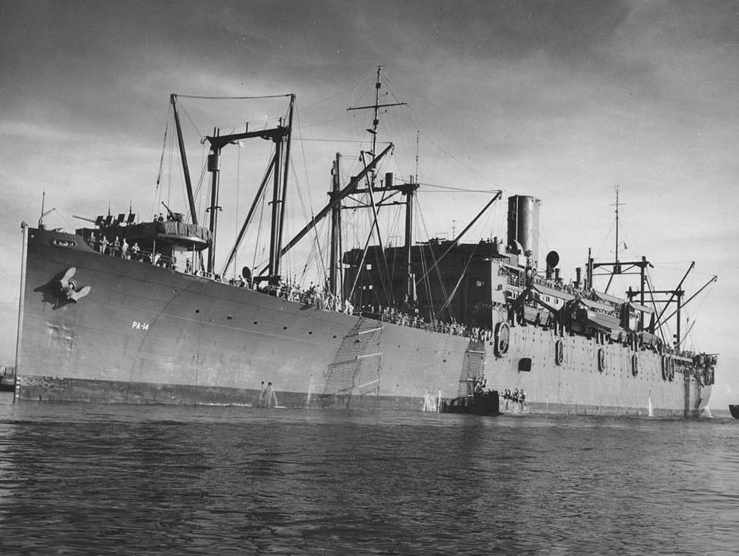
- USS Hunter Liggett (APA-14) c. 1943-44

History

United States
- Name: Palmetto State; Pan America; Hunter Liggett
- Namesake: Hunter Liggett, US Army General
- Builder: Bethlehem Steel
- Launched: 4 June 1921
- Christened: Palmetto State
- Acquired: (by the Navy) 27 May 1941
- Commissioned: (As AP-27) 9 June 1941
- Decommissioned: 18 March 1946
- Renamed: Pan America; Hunter Liggett (Feb 1939)
- Reclassified: AP-27 to APA-14, 1 February 1943
- Identification: United States O/N: 221930
- Honours and awards: Four battle stars for World War II service
- Fate: Sold for scrap, 30 January 1948

General characteristics
- Class & type: EFC Design 1029 ship; (Navy) Harris-class attack transport
- Displacement: 13,529 tons (lt), 21,900 t.(fl)
- Length: 535 ft 2 in (163.12 m)
- Beam: 72 ft 4 in (22.05 m)
- Draft: 31 ft 3 in (9.53 m)
- Propulsion: 2 x Bethlehem Steel Curtis type turbines, 8 x Yarrow header-type boilers, 2 propellers, designed shaft horsepower 12,000.
- Speed: 15-18 knots (sources vary)
- Capacity: Troops: 107 Officers, 1,417 Enlisted; Cargo: 140,000 cu ft, 1,900 tons
- Complement: Officers 52, Enlisted 673
- Armament: 4 x 3"/50 caliber dual-purpose guns, 2 x twin 40mm guns, 2 x quad 1.1" guns, 15 x single 20mm guns.

USS Hunter Liggett (APA-14) was built as an Emergency Fleet Corporation (EFC) Design 1029 ship. It was launched as Palmetto State, and shortly after, renamed Pan America for operation as the United States Shipping Board (USSB) owned liner operated by the Munson Steamship Line on New York to South American service. The ship was acquired by the War Department in February 1939, where it was once more renamed. The new Hunter Liggett was then ready for operation, as a United States Army transport vehicle mainly running between New York and San Francisco.

On 27 May 1941 Hunter Liggett was turned over to the Navy, first classed as the transport AP-27 and then reclassed as the attack transport APA-14 (Harris-class) on 1 February 1943. The ship served throughout World War II and was decommissioned 18 March 1946 and sold for scrapping on 30 January 1948.

== Construction ==
Palmetto State was built as an Emergency Fleet Corporation (EFC) Design 1029 ship, in 1922 by the Bethlehem Shipbuilding Corporation of Sparrows Point, Maryland for the United States Shipping Board (USSB), United States official number 221930.

== Commercial service ==
The USSB owned Palmetto State, one of the type known as "535's" for their length overall in commercial service, was renamed Pan America and operated for the USSB as the Pan America Line by the Munson Steamship Line along with sisters American Legion, Southern Cross and Western World on a New York to Rio de Janeiro, Montevideo and Buenos Aires route with Santos, added during return voyages.

As the USSB sold off its vessels the Munson Steamship Line bought the four vessels operating for its Pan America Line service in February 1926. Each ship, including Pan America, was purchased for a price of $1,026,000.

== Army transport ==
Pan America was transferred to the War Department for operation as a United States Army transport and renamed Hunter Liggett in February 1939 and converted at New York by Robins Dry Dock and Repair Company. From April USAT Hunter Liggett operated from New York to San Francisco with one West Coast to Hawaii voyage until September when she began operating from New York to Charleston and Cristobal, Panama. In January 1940 the ship returned to the West Coast for Army maneuvers before voyaging to Honolulu and returning to New York where she remained on the service between there and San Francisco until undergoing repairs June–July 1940 before resuming normal operations. On 27 May 1941 Hunter Liggett was turned over to the Navy.

== Navy commission ==
Converted to Navy use at Brooklyn Navy Yard, she commissioned as AP-27 9 June 1941, Captain L. W. Perkins, USCG, commanding. She was reclassed APA-14 1 February 1943.

== World War II ==
Hunter Liggett and her US Coast Guard crew were ordered to the Pacific in April 1942. Departing New York 9 April the ship stopped at the Canal Zone and Tongatapu before arriving Wellington, New Zealand, 28 May.

=== Invasion of Guadalcanal ===
The transport was scheduled to take part in America's first offensive operation in the Pacific, the occupation of Guadalcanal, and after amphibious training and a rehearsal landing in the Koro Islands she sailed with other ships 31 July for the Solomons.

Hunter Liggett arrived off Guadalcanal the night of 6 August. In this assault, America's first amphibious operation since 1898, the ship was assigned to a later wave but sent her boats to aid in the initial landings, 7 August. Air attacks began on the day after the landing, sinking fellow transport George F. Elliott. Hunter Liggett's gunners shot down several of the attackers as she remained off the beaches.

Early on the morning of 9 August, men in the transport area could see the flashes of light from an engagement off Savo Island. As the Japanese attempted to reinforce their Solomons garrison and destroy the transports they surprised an American Task Force and inflicted heavy losses. Hunter Liggett and the other vulnerable transports got underway, but soon returned to the transport area. After noon 9 August, they began the grim job of rescuing survivors from the sunken cruisers Vincennes, Astoria, and Quincy.

That afternoon the transport sailed with the wounded, in company with the damaged Chicago, to Noumea, where she arrived 2 days later. With the Guadalcanal campaign began the refinement of amphibious techniques which was to pay off so handsomely as the war progressed.

The transport spent the next month at Noumea and on local amphibious training operations. After a period of repair at Wellington she sailed 22 October for Efate, New Hebrides, loaded marines, and returned to bitterly contested Guadalcanal 4 November. As she off-loaded near Lunga Point, Japanese shore batteries and air attacks made every moment a potentially fatal one. As the Tokyo Express was due that night, Hunter Liggett and the other transports retired in the evening, only to return next day to finish landing operations.

For most of the next year, Hunter Liggett remained on this hazardous duty, the support of Guadalcanal. She made numerous trips to the island bringing troops from Noumea and New Zealand, carried equipment, and transported wounded marines and Japanese prisoners from the embattled island. Constantly threatened from the air and by submarines, she continued this vital job until arriving 22 October 1943, when she anchored at Efate, New Hebrides.

=== Invasion of Bougainville ===
At Efate, Hunter Liggett took part in training operations for another important amphibious operation, the invasion of Bougainville. As American strength grew and the Gilberts operation got underway to the east, the task force sailed 28 October for Empress Augusta Bay, Bougainville. Arriving early 1 November the transports unloaded with startling efficiency during air attacks from Rabaul.

Hunter Liggett remained in the area that night and once more witnessed from afar the Japanese attempt to break up the landing. This time, in the night action of Empress Augusta Bay the Japanese were soundly defeated by Rear Admiral Merrill's task force. Hunter Liggett departed that day for Tulagi and after another passage to Bougainville to support the amphibious toe-hold there 11 November sailed for Espiritu Santo 18 November.

=== Made a training ship ===
Loading wounded at Espiritu Santo, Hunter Liggett proceeded to Pago Pago for more casualties and sailed for San Francisco, arriving 9 December. For several months the transport underwent major repairs. Then, 3 April 1944, she steamed to San Diego to begin a new career as an amphibious training ship. For the next 8 months she imparted the lessons learned in the Solomons campaign to those who would carry out some of the largest and best executed assaults in US Naval history - Leyte, Iwo Jima, Okinawa, and others.

=== After hostilities ===
Hunter Liggett joined the Operation Magic Carpet fleet 10 December 1945 to return American servicemen from the Pacific. She made voyages to Ulithi, Guam, Pearl Harbor, and the Palaus before reporting to Olympia, Washington, for return to the Army 9 March 1946.

Hunter Liggett decommissioned 18 March 1946. She was sold for scrapping to the Boston Metals Company on 30 January 1948.

== Awards ==
Hunter Liggett received four battle stars for World War II service.

== Legacy ==
Hunter Liggett Avenue at the United States Coast Guard Academy in New London, Connecticut is named after USS Hunter Liggett.

== Bibliography ==
- Charles, Roland W. (1947). Troopships of World War II (PDF). Washington: The Army Transportation Association. p. 36. LCCN 47004779. Archived from the original (PDF) on 2 April 2015.
- Larsson, Björn (15 November 2009). "Munson Line". Maritime Timetable Images. Björn Larsson.
- McKellar, Norman L. "Steel Shipbuilding under the U. S. Shipping Board, 1917-1921, Part V, Contract Steel Ships". Steel Shipbuilding under the U. S. Shipping Board, 1917-1921. ShipScribe.
- Naval History And Heritage Command. "Hunter Liggett". Dictionary of American Naval Fighting Ships. Naval History And Heritage Command.
- United States Shipping Board (1926). Tenth Annual Report of the United States Shipping Board. Washington.
