= SS Managua =

- Managua sister ship SS Point Bonita

History
- Name: (United States) Glorieta (1919-1920); (United States) Munisla (1920-1937); (Honduras) Neptuno (1937-1941); (Nicaragua) Managua (1941-1942)
- Owner: Garcia A. & Cia. Ltda
- Operator: USSB (1919–1920); Munson Steamship Line (1920–1937); Garcia (Honduras) (1937–1941); Garcia (Nicaragua) (1941–1942)
- Port of registry: Bluefields, Nicaragua
- Builder: Albina Engine & Machinery Works Inc.
- Yard number: 13
- Launched: 20 March 1919
- Completed: 1919
- Identification: Glorieta/Munisla; U.S. Official Number 217829; Signal; LQNT; Managua; Signal; YNAH
- Fate: Torpedoed and sunk 16 June 1942

General characteristics
- Type: Design 1049 Cargo ship
- Tonnage: 2,648 GRT, 1,621 NRT (1920); 2,220 GRT, 1,330 NRT (1927)
- Length: 289 ft (88.1 m) registry
- Beam: 44.1 ft (13.4 m)
- Depth: 19.2 ft (5.9 m)
- Installed power: 1 x 3 cyl. triple expansion engine
- Propulsion: Screw propeller
- Speed: 12 knots
- Crew: 25

SS Managua was a Nicaraguan cargo ship that the German submarine U-67 torpedoed on 16 June 1942 in the Straits of Florida while she was travelling from Charleston, South Carolina, United States to Havana, Cuba with a cargo of potash. The ship was built as Glorieta, a Design 1049 ship in 1919, operated by the United States Shipping Board (USSB) until sold to the Munson Steamship Line in 1920 and renamed Munisla. The ship was sold foreign to a Honduran company, Garcia, in 1937 and renamed Neptuno. In 1941 the ship was re-flagged in Nicaragua with the name Managua.

== Construction ==
Glorieta was built as the Emergency Fleet Corporation Design 1049 cargo ship at the Albina Engine & Machinery Works Inc. shipyard in Portland, Oregon as the yard's hull number 13 in 1919. Glorieta was launched and completed that same year, given U.S. Official Number 217829, signal LNQT with home port of New York, New York. Registry of 1920 shows the ship registered as 2,648 GRT, 1,621 NRT, 289 ft (88.1 m) registry length, 44.1 ft (13.4 m) beam and depth of 19.2 ft (5.9 m). Propulsion was by 1 x 3 cyl. triple expansion engine driving a screw propeller. The ship could reach a maximum speed of 12 knots and could generate 313 n.h.p. After purchase by Munson the ship's tonnage changed to 2,220 GRT, 1,330 NRT.

== Sinking ==
Managua departed Charleston, South Carolina on 13 June 1942 for Havana, Cuba with a cargo of Potash with a stopover at Jacksonville, Florida. At 04.01 am on 16 June, Managua was hit on the port side in #3 hold by a torpedo from the German submarine U-67 about 45 nautical miles (83 km) southwest of Sombrero Lighthouse in the Straits of Florida. The following explosion broke the back of Managua which caused her to list to her port side and sank by the stern in 11 minutes. All 25 crew members safely evacuated the ship in two lifeboats and two rafts but weren't able to send a distress signal.

U-67 then surfaced and approached one of the lifeboats. The u-boat crew ordered two men from the lifeboats to come aboard for questioning. They were asked about the name of their vessel, their last port of departure, their destination, their cargo and if there were English or Americans amongst the crew. Afterwards they were allowed to return to the lifeboats with their fellow crewmen. The first lifeboat reached Matanzas, Cuba on 17 June followed by the second lifeboat at Pigeon Key, Florida that same day.

== Wreck ==
The wreck of Managua lies at (24°05′N 81°40′W).
