= USS Munplace =

Cargo ship of the United States Navy

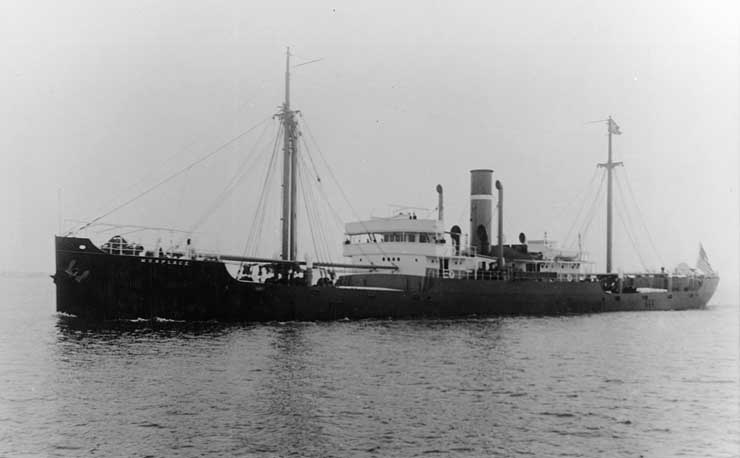
- SS Munplace (ID-2346), probably around the time of her completion in 1916.

History

United States
- Name: Munplace
- Namesake: Previous name retained
- Builder: Maryland Steel Company, Sparrows Point, Maryland
- Launched: 10 April 1916
- Completed: 9 May 1916
- Acquired: 31 August 1918
- Commissioned: 31 August 1918
- Decommissioned: 15 February 1919
- Fate: Transferred to United States Shipping Board 15 February 1919 for simultaneous return to owners
- Notes: In commercial service as SS Munalbro 1916-1918 and 1919-1939; Scrapped 1939

General characteristics
- Type: Cargo ship
- Tonnage: 3,315 Gross register tons
- Displacement: 7,345 tons (normal)
- Length: 328 ft 6 in (100.13 m)
- Beam: 46 ft 2 in (14.07 m)
- Draft: 21 ft 6 in (6.55 m)
- Propulsion: Steam engine
- Speed: 11 knots
- Complement: 93
- Armament: 2 × 3-inch (76.2-millimeter) guns

USS Munplace (ID-2346) was a cargo ship that served in the United States Navy from 1918 to 1919.

SS Munplace was built as a commercial cargo ship by the Maryland Steel Company at Sparrows Point, Maryland, in 1916, for the Munson Steamship Line. She was delivered to Munson on 9 May 1916 and entered mercantile service. The U.S. Navy acquired Munplace from Munson for World War I service on 31 August 1918, assigned her the naval registry Identification Number (Id. No.) 2346, and commissioned her as USS Munplace at Newport News, Virginia, the same day.

Assigned to the Naval Overseas Transportation Service (NOTS), Munplace was loaded with a cargo of United States Army supplies, made a transatlantic crossing to France in convoy, and arrived at Rochefort, France, on 4 October 1918. Proceeding to La Pallice, France, she discharged her cargo, went on to Le Verdon-sur-Mer, France, and returned to the United States, arriving at Norfolk, Virginia, on 10 November 1918. World War I ended the next day.

In December 1918, Munplace departed Norfolk and delivered another U.S. Army cargo to La Pallice. She then returned to the United States, arriving at Newport News in January 1919

On 15 February 1919 Munplace was decommissioned and delivered to the United States Shipping Board for simultaneous return to Munson Steamship Line. She returned to mercantile service as SS Munplace, remaining in commercial use until she was scrapped at Baltimore, Maryland, in 1939.
