= USS Munwood =

Cargo steamship that served in the United States Navy

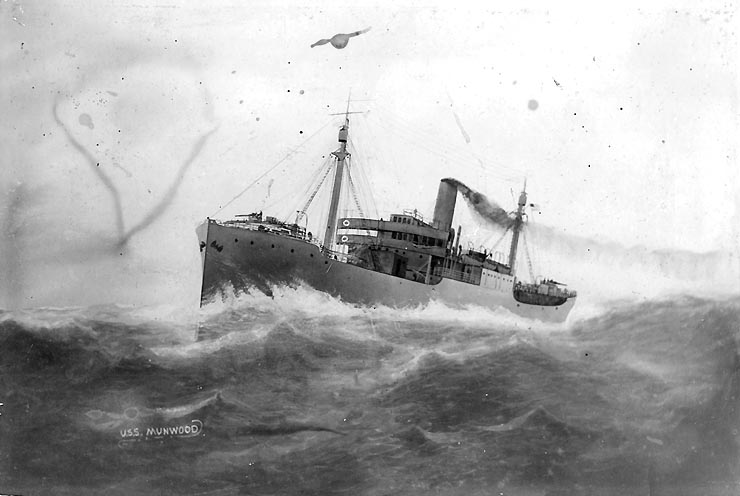
- A painting of Munwood in US Navy service

History
- Name: 1914: Munwood; 1928: Vila
- Owner: 1914: Crossburn SS Co Ltd; 1914: Munson SS Line; 1917: Munwood SS Line; 1928: Brodarsko Akc Drustvo "Oceania"
- Operator: 1914: Clark & Service; 1917: Munson SS Line; 1918: United States Navy
- Port of registry: 1914: (United Kingdom) Glasgow; 1914: (United States) New York; 1928: (Kingdom of Yugoslavia) Susak
- Builder: Scotts Sb & Eng Co, Greenock
- Yard number: 457
- Launched: 7 May 1914
- Completed: 1914
- Acquired: for US Navy, 16 October 1918
- Commissioned: by US Navy, 26 October 1918
- Decommissioned: by US Navy, 3 March 1919
- Identification: 1914: UK official number 136299; 1914: US official number 212924; code letters LFDM; 1918: call sign KUH; Pennant number 4660; 1928: code letters JTVR; 1934: call sign YTFB
- Fate: sank after collision, 1935

General characteristics
- Type: cargo ship
- Tonnage: 3,190 GRT, 2,035 NRT, 5,400 DWT
- Displacement: 8,516 tons
- Length: 345.0 ft (105.2 m)
- Beam: 48.0 ft (14.6 m)
- Draft: 22 ft 3 1/2 in (6.79 m)
- Depth: 24.2 ft (7.4 m)
- Decks: 2
- Installed power: 320 NHP
- Propulsion: triple-expansion engine
- Speed: 11 1/2 knots (21.3 km/h)
- Complement: in US Navy service, 87
- Armament: in the First World War: 1 × 5-inch/40-caliber gun; 1 × 3-inch/50-caliber gun

USS Munwood (ID-4460) was a cargo steamship that was built in Scotland in 1914 and was part of the United States Merchant Marine until 1928. From 1918 to 1919 she served in the United States Navy. In 1928 Yugoslav interests bought her and renamed her Vila. In 1935 she sank as the result of a collision in the Adriatic Sea.

== Building ==
Scotts Shipbuilding and Engineering Company built Munwood at Greenock on the Firth of Clyde as yard number 457. She was launched on 7 May 1914 and completed later that year. Her registered length was 345.0 ft (105.2 m), her beam was 48.0 ft (14.6 m) and her depth was 24.2 ft (7.4 m). Her tonnages were 3,190 GRT, 2,035 NRT and 5,400 DWT.

She had a single screw, driven by a three-cylinder triple-expansion steam engine that was rated at 320 NHP and gave her a speed of 11 1/2 knots (21.3 km/h).

Munwood's first owner was the Crossburn Steamship Company, which was a Scottish subsidiary of the Munson Steamship Line of the United States. Munson gave many of its ships names beginning with "Mun-". She was registered in Glasgow, and her United Kingdom official number was 136299.

== US ownership ==
Later in 1914, Munwood's ownership was transferred to the US parent company, and she was re-registered in New York. Her US official number was 212924 and her code letters were LFDM. By 1918 she was equipped for wireless telegraphy, and her call sign was KUH.

From 29 September 1917 Munwood carried cargoes to France. She was defensively armed with one 5-inch/40-caliber gun and one 3-inch/50-caliber gun, and US Navy armed guards were added to her complement to crew her guns.

On 16 October 1918 the US Navy acquired Munwood, and on 26 October at Baltimore it commissioned her as USS Munwood with the Identification Number (ID) 4660. She was assigned to the Naval Overseas Transportation Service Army Account. On 29 November, two and a half weeks after the Armistice of 11 November 1918, she left Baltimore for France carrying about 4,000 tons of US Army stores, including 1,500 tons of gasoline in drums.

The Naval History and Heritage Command claims that on 10 December Munwood answered a distress signal from a Portuguese steamship called Queda, took her in tow, and reached Bermuda on 15 December. However, records of the existence of a Portuguese merchant ship of that name at the time are lacking.

On arrival at Bermuda, gasoline was found to be leaking from some of the drums in Munwood's cargo, spreading fumes throughout the ship. For safety her cargo was discharged in Bermuda, and she loaded 6,483 tons of coal instead. On 27 December 1918 she left Bermuda and on 10 January 1919 she reached Quiberon in Brittany, but the port was so busy that there was no berth for her, so she diverted to Nantes, where she discharged her cargo on 20 January.

Munwood was damaged in a collision with the British cargo steamship Baylula. Munwood was repaired, and then loaded a cargo of 2,500 tons of shrapnel plus ballast. On 30 January she left Nantes and on 18 February she reached Bermuda, where she discharged the shrapnel. She continued to Baltimore, where the Navy decommissioned her on 3 March and returned her via the United States Shipping Board to her owners.

== Vila ==
In 1928 Brodarsko Akcionarsco Drustvo "Oceania" bought Munwood, renamed her Vila and registered her in Susak in Dalmatia. Her Yugoslav code letters were JTVR, and by 1934 her four-letter call sign was YTFB.

On 20 February 1935 Vila was en route from Trieste to Venice, carrying a cargo of phosphates and wheat, when she was involved in a collision at the mouth of the Piave with the Italian motor ship Rodi. Vila sank as a result, and four of her crew were killed. Rodi rescued the survivors.

== Bibliography ==
- Lloyd's Register of Shipping. Vol. I–Steamers. London: Lloyd's Register of Shipping. 1914 – via Internet Archive.
- Lloyd's Register of Shipping. Vol. I–Steamers. London: Lloyd's Register of Shipping. 1917 – via Internet Archive.
- Lloyd's Register of Shipping (PDF). Vol. II–Steamers and Motorships of 300 tons gross and over. London: Lloyd's Register of Shipping. 1930 – via Southampton City Council.
- Lloyd's Register of Shipping (PDF). Vol. II–Steamers and Motorships of 300 tons gross and over. London: Lloyd's Register of Shipping. 1934 – via Southampton City Council.
- The Marconi Press Agency Ltd (1918). The Year Book of Wireless Telegraphy and Telephony. London: The Wireless Press, Ltd.
