= USS Munindies =

Cargo ship of the United States Navy

History

United States
- Name: USS Munindies
- Namesake: Previous name retained
- Builder: Newport News Shipbuilding and Drydock Company, Newport News, Virginia
- Launched: 17 October 1917
- Completed: 7 December 1917
- Acquired: 17 December 1917
- Commissioned: 17 December 1917
- Decommissioned: 25 April 1919 or 24 July 1919
- Fate: Transferred to United States Shipping Board 25 April 1919 or 24 July 1919 for return to owners
- Notes: Served as commercial cargo ship SS Munindies 1919-1939; Sunk by naval mine November 1939

General characteristics
- Class & type: Mundelta-class cargo ship
- Displacement: 10,400 tons (normal)
- Length: 385 ft (117 m)
- Beam: 53 ft (16 m)
- Draft: 24 ft (7.3 m)
- Propulsion: Steam engine
- Speed: 11.5 knots
- Complement: 62
- Armament: 1 × 4-inch (102-millimeter) gun; 1 × 3-inch (76.2-millimeter) gun

USS Munindies (ID-2093) was a cargo ship that served in the United States Navy from 1917 to 1919.

SS Munindies was built as a commercial cargo ship in 1917 at Newport News, Virginia, by Newport News Shipbuilding and Drydock Company for the Munson Steamship Line of New York City. Launched on 17 October 1917, she was delivered to the Munson Steamship Line on 7 December 1917. The U.S. Navy acquired her for World War I service from Munson on 17 December 1917. Assigned naval registry Identification Number (Id. No.) 2093, she was commissioned at Norfolk, Virginia, as USS Munindies the same day.

Assigned to the Naval Overseas Transportation Service, Munindies loaded 5,200 tons of United States Army cargo at Philadelphia, Pennsylvania, and sailed for Europe in convoy on 4 January 1918, arriving at La Pallice, France, on 25 January 1918. She departed Bordeaux, France, for the United States East Coast on 27 February 1918, arriving in the United States on 2 March 1918.

Munindies made three more crossings to Europe in U.S. Navy service. Her final transatlantic voyage for the Navy ended at New York City on 11 December 1918.

On 11 January 1919, Munindies got underway with general supplies for Argentina, reaching La Plata, Argentina, on 12 February 1919 to unload her cargo. She returned to New York City on 4 April 1919

Munindies was decommissioned on either 25 April 1919 or 24 July 1919. On the day of her decommissioning she was transferred to the United States Shipping Board for return to the Munson Steamship Line.

Once again SS Munindies, she operated for the Munson Steamship Line in commercial service until November 1939, when she was sunk by a naval mine during World War II.
