= USS Munrio =

Cargo ship of the United States Navy

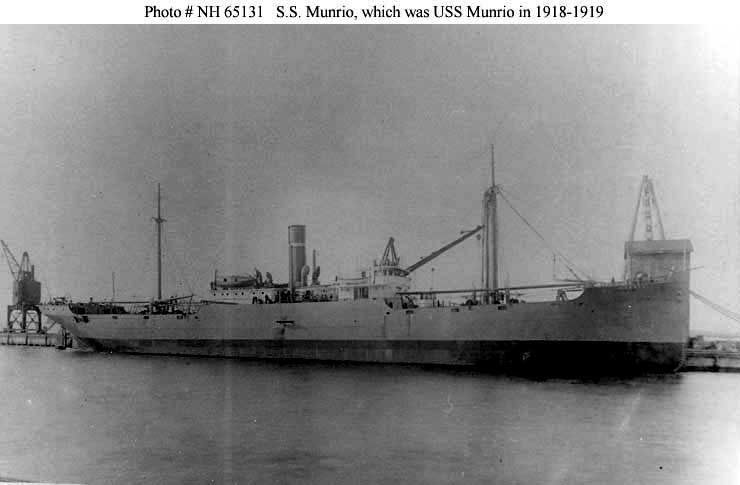
- SS Munrio, probably around the time of her completion in 1916.

History

United States
- Name: USS Munrio
- Namesake: Previous name retained
- Builder: Maryland Steel Company, Sparrows Point, Maryland
- Launched: 14 September 1916
- Completed: 1916
- Acquired: 14 November 1918
- Commissioned: 14 November 1918
- Decommissioned: 3 February 1919
- Fate: Transferred to United States Shipping Board 3 February 1919 for simultaneous return to owners
- Notes: In commercial service as SS Munrio 1916-1918 and 1919-1937, SS Szent Gellert 1937-1940, SS Carola 1940-1946, SS Mary Louise 1946-1950, SS Maria L. 1950, SS Tropic 1950, and SS Nerina 1950; Wrecked 25 November 1950

General characteristics
- Type: Cargo ship
- Tonnage: 3,868 Gross register tons
- Displacement: 8,330 tons (normal)
- Length: 346 ft 6 in (105.61 m)
- Beam: 48 ft 2 in (14.68 m)
- Draft: 23 ft (7.0 m) (mean)
- Propulsion: Steam engine
- Speed: 12.0 knots
- Complement: 60
- Armament: None

USS Munrio (ID-2054) was a cargo ship that served in the United States Navy from 1918 to 1919.

SS Munrio was built as a commercial cargo ship by the Maryland Steel Company at Sparrows Point, Maryland, in 1916, for the Munson Steamship Line. The U.S. Navy acquired Munrio from Munson on 14 November 1918, assigned her the naval registry Identification Number (Id. No.) 2054, and commissioned her as USS Munrio at Philadelphia, Pennsylvania, the same day.

Assigned to the Naval Overseas Transportation Service (NOTS), Munrio departed Philadelphia with a cargo of 4,207 tons of United States Army supplies for France on 21 November 1918, arriving at Le Havre, France, on 10 December 1918 to unload her cargo. On 25 December 1918 she crossed the English Channel to Plymouth, England. On 27 December 1918 she got underway with a mixed U.S. Army cargo of 2,500 tons for Philadelphia, where she arrived on 12 January 1919.

Munrio was decommissioned on 3 February 1919 and transferred to the United States Shipping Board the same day for simultaneous return to Munson Steamship Line.

She returned to mercantile service as SS Munrio, operating under that name until 1937, when she was renamed SS Szent Gellert. She became SS Carola in 1940, SS Mary Louise in 1946 and SS Maria L. in 1950. She underwent two more name changes in 1950, to SS Tropic and then SS Nerina, before her long career came to an end when she was wrecked near Santa Cruz del Norte, Cuba, on 25 November 1950.
