= USS Wharton =

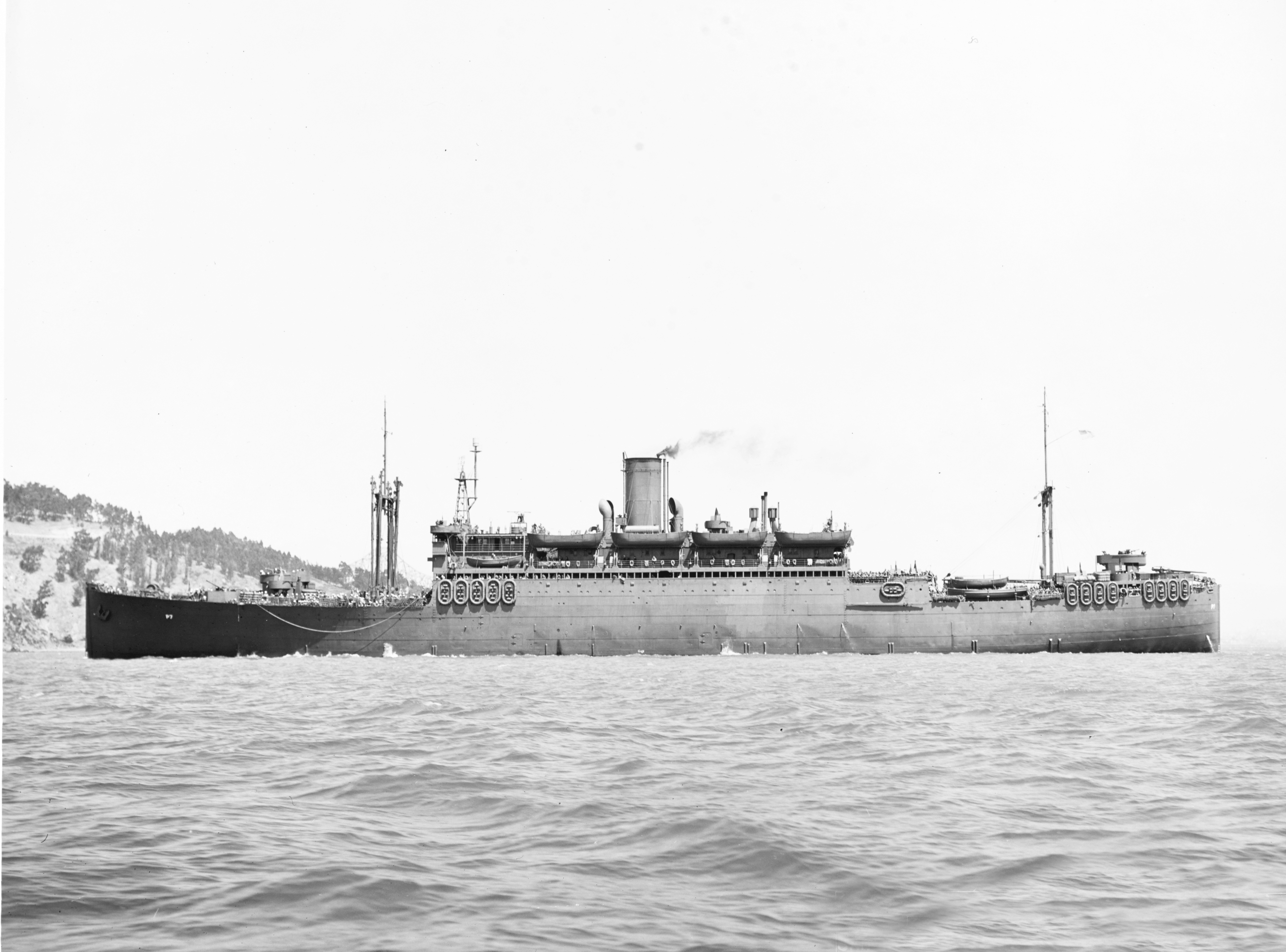
- USS Wharton c. 1941

History

United States
- Name: Sea Girt; Southern Cross; Wharton
- Namesake: Franklin Wharton
- Laid down: 8 October 1918
- Launched: 20 July 1919
- Completed: 24 September 1921
- Acquired: 8 November 1939
- Commissioned: 7 December 1940
- Decommissioned: 26 March 1947
- Stricken: 4 April 1947
- Honors and awards: 3 battle stars (World War II)
- Fate: Sold for scrapping, 21 March 1952
- Notes: U.S. Official Number: 221574

General characteristics
- Type: Design 1029 ship
- Displacement: 12,250 long tons (12,447 t) light; 21,900 long tons (22,251 t) full
- Length: 636 ft 2 in (193.90 m)
- Beam: 72 ft (22 m)
- Draft: 31 ft 3 in (9.53 m)
- Propulsion: Steam turbine
- Speed: 16.6 knots (30.7 km/h; 19.1 mph)
- Complement: 666 officers and enlisted
- Armament: 4 × single 5"/38 caliber guns; 8 × 0.5 in (12.7 mm) machine guns

USS Wharton (AP-7) was a troop transport in the service of the United States Navy during World War II. The ship was originally an Emergency Fleet Corporation Design 1029 type built for the United States Shipping Board. The ship was laid down as Manmasco but renamed and launched as Sea Girt then completed September 1921 as Southern Cross. The ship was first allocated by the United States Shipping Board to the Munson Steamship Line until purchased by the line in 1925. Munson operated the Southern Cross in the South American trade from 1921 until 1938 when the ship was sold at a Marshall's sale and taken over by the United States Maritime Commission which paid the full mortgage claim.

Southern Cross was acquired by the Navy from the Maritime Commission on 8 November 1939 and two days later renamed Wharton and designated a transport with the hull number AP-7. She was converted to a troop transport by the Todd Shipbuilding Corp., in the Robbins Drydock in Erie Basin at Brooklyn, New York. The transport was commissioned USS Wharton at the New York Navy Yard on 7 December 1940.

== Commercial service ==
Southern Cross was allocated by the USSB to its agent, Munson Steamship Line for its South American service, operating as the Pan America Line. Munson operated the ship on the New York to Rio de Janeiro, Montevideo and Buenos Aires route with Santos, added during return voyages along with sister "535's" American Legion, Pan America and Western World.

As the USSB sold off its vessels the Munson Steamship Line bought the four vessels operating for its Pan America Line service in February 1926. Each ship, including Southern Cross, was purchased for a price of $1,026,000.

== World War II Pacific Theatre operations ==
Wharton departed Brooklyn on 7 January 1941, bound for Guantánamo Bay, Cuba, where she conducted shakedown before proceeding on through the Panama Canal to her home port, Mare Island, California. Assigned to the Naval Transportation Service, Wharton transported service personnel and their families, as well as cargo, on triangular runs from San Francisco, San Diego, and Pearl Harbor. She also made one trip to Midway Island.

== First wartime operations ==
When the Japanese struck Pearl Harbor, Hawaii, on 7 December 1941, Wharton was undergoing overhaul at the Mare Island Navy Yard, Vallejo, California. On 6 January 1942, the transport sailed from the west coast for her first wartime voyage to the Hawaiian Islands. A series of runs followed in which Wharton transported service families and dependents home to the west coast on her eastbound passages and troops and cargo to Hawaii on her westbound trips.

From June through September, Wharton made three voyages to the Southwest Pacific theater – loading and unloading at such ports as Pago Pago, Samoa; Auckland, New Zealand; Espiritu Santo, New Hebrides; Nouméa, New Caledonia; Canton Island, and Suva, Fiji Islands. Between 6 and 11 August 1942 the ship transported 15 officers and 465 enlisted men of the 6th Naval Construction Battalion (6th NCB) from American Samoa to Espiritu Santo, New Hebrides with the other 7 officers and 433 enlisted men of the battalion being aboard SS President Polk, picking up the 7th Naval Construction Battalion from Samoa on the way. Wharton returned to the west coast for an overhaul which lasted into October. The troop transport then began a series of trips to the Aleutians which lasted from December 1942 to February 1943, carrying troops from Seattle, Washington, to Kodiak and Dutch Harbor and returning with civilians, troops, and patients. For the remainder of the year, Wharton made five more trips to the Southwest Pacific, during which she revisited Pago Pago, Nouméa, Suva, Espiritu Santo, where on 20 Nov 1943 she again embarked the 7th NCB for return to the United States, and Wellington, while adding Apia, British Samoa; Guadalcanal, Solomons; and Efate, New Hebrides; to her itinerary.

== Invasion of the Marshall Islands ==
In January 1944, Wharton joined Transport Division 30 for the Marshall Islands operation. Equipped with seven manned LCVP's, Wharton sortied from Pearl Harbor in Task Group 51.1 on 23 January 1944, bound for Kwajalein and Eniwetok, with 526 Army Headquarters troops embarked. The group operated off the island of Bigej in Kwajalein Atoll from 31 January to 2 February, during the shore bombardment phase of the operation and the initial landings, before moving into the lagoon and anchoring there on 2 February.

Wharton remained in the lagoon until she headed for Eniwetok on the 15th. Following her arrival there two days later, the troop transport, while disembarking her troops and unloading her cargo, took on additional duty as a hospital ship. She received on board 85 patients for treatment and subsequently transferred them all to other facilities prior to sailing for Kwajalein on 25 February.

== Running aground at Manus ==
On 29 February 1944, Wharton got underway for the Ellice Islands to embark the 11th Naval Construction Battalion at Banika in the Russell Islands as well as the 58th NCB for transportation to the Admiralties. At 1700 on 17 April, while entering Seeadler Harbor at Manus, she ran aground due to an inaccurate chart and poor placement of buoys marking the channel. After the ship had been refloated at 0100 on the 18th, a quick check revealed no damage to her hull or machinery.

Wharton later transported 1,782 men of the Royal New Zealand Army from Green Island to Nouméa before sailing for Espiritu Santo and Guadalcanal. At the latter island – the scene of bitter struggles from August 1942 to February 1943 – the ship participated in training exercises with Transport Division 8. After two weeks of practice landings, Wharton sailed for Kwajalein with 1,587 troops of the 2nd Battalion of the 12th Marines and the 1st Battalion of the 3rd Marines embarked. At Kwajalein, she transferred the latter unit to LST's for the impending operations against the Japanese-held Marianas.

She got underway for Guam on 12 June and spent 17 days at sea before returning to Kwajalein, because fierce Japanese resistance on Saipan had forced Admiral Nimitz to postpone American landings on Guam. Underway again on 17 July, the transport made landfall off Guam four days later and soon disembarked her assault troops. That night, she retired to sea until midnight, when she reversed course to return to the beachhead for her role as casualty evacuation ship.

== Assisting the wounded at Guam ==
On the day that followed, she continued this pattern of operations. Although not designed for such work, Wharton performed yeoman service off the beaches. Two of the ship's lifeboats were kept ready in their davits for instant deployment, and litters containing casualties were brought alongside in landing craft and transferred to these boats which were then hoisted up to the promenade deck level to be rushed to emergency dressing stations in the passenger officers' wardroom spaces. During the landing operations, some 723 patients were logged into Wharton's sick bay, most of them coming on board by way of this improvised "lifeboat elevator."

Operating in company with USS Rixey (APH-3), Wharton returned to the transport area each morning for eight successive days to receive casualties and send an occasional beach party ashore. These latter groups worked on the off-shore reef, unloading supplies and ammunition from LCM's – which could not cross the coral to waiting amphibious tractors which carried the cargo to the beachhead. Working often in 24-hour stretches, these men on occasion came under enemy mortar fire. On 29 July, her part in the Guam operation completed, Wharton headed for Eniwetok with 519 patients embarked.

Following the Marianas operation, Wharton returned to the United States, reaching San Francisco on 25 August. After two months of repairs, the ship resumed her transport duties and made a voyage to Guadalcanal, Espiritu Santo, and Nouméa before returning to the United States late in the year.

== Supporting Invasion of the Philippines ==
On 7 January 1945, Wharton got underway for the Philippine Islands, carrying troops and cargo in support of the operations to wrest the islands from the Japanese. She disembarked 1,386 troops and 131 tons of cargo at Samar on 14 February and, two days later, unloaded 134 tons of cargo and 869 more troops at Leyte Island. Underway for home on the 17th, the transport stopped at Ulithi before pressing on eastward and arriving at San Francisco on 12 March.

== Supporting the Okinawa invasion ==
Wharton next participated in the operations against Okinawa, arriving offshore on 19 May. The transport soon disembarked 2,118 troops (including 30 Army nurses) in LCM's sent from shore, as Wharton ordinarily carried no landing craft of her own. Several times, the ship went to general quarters and was screened by smoke, but she emerged from the campaign unscathed by kamikazes that had taken such a dreadful toll from American ships. On 22 May, the transport departed for the Caroline Islands, with 273 troops and 29 casualties embarked, and arrived at Ulithi on the 28th.

Wharton took part in no further combat operations and returned home – via Seeadler Harbor, Guadalcanal, Espiritu Santo, Nouméa, and Suva – to San Francisco on 25 June. The ship remained there until 3 August, when she moved to Seattle, Washington, before returning to Pearl Harbor.

== End-of-War activities ==
Hostilities had then ended, but the gigantic job of returning troops from the far-flung bases and islands nonetheless remained. Wharton conducted three voyages to the western Pacific – calling at Eniwetok, Guam, Saipan, Samar, Tacloban, and Puerto Princesa through the end of 1945 to pick up Army, Navy, and Marine Corps veterans and return them to the United States in "Operation Magic Carpet". Wharton made one more trip under "Magic Carpet" to Yokosuka, Japan, in February 1946.

== Bikini Atoll A-Bomb testing ==
In the spring of 1946, Wharton participated in "Operation Crossroads" – transporting observers to Bikini Atoll for the atomic bomb tests which were to be conducted there in July. She remained there until the completion of her duties on 27 August. She made one round-trip cruise from San Francisco to Guam and one from San Francisco to the Far East, adding Yokohama and Sasebo, Japan; and Shanghai, China; to her list of ports of call.

Wharton was awarded three battle stars for her World War II service.

== Post-War deactivation and decommissioning ==
The transport returned to the United States on 28 January, when she made port at San Francisco prior to heading north to Seattle, Washington, and arrived there on 9 February 1947. On 11 March, the Secretary of the Navy declared Wharton "surplus to Navy needs" and accordingly authorized her disposal. Decommissioned on 26 March 1947, Wharton was stricken from the Navy List on 4 April 1947. In a report dated 28 March 1947 the Navy formally declared the ship surplus to the U.S. Maritime Commission as disposal agency.

The ship, evaluated as in very poor condition with one engine having a broken reduction gear and reported leaks in the forepeak, entered U.S. Maritime Commission custody on 27 March 1947 at Olympia, Washington. The hull was sold for $368,426 to Bethlehem Pacific Coast Steel Corporation in bids opened 1 February 1952 and withdrawn from the reserve fleet for scrapping on 21 March 1952.

The ship's bell was saved, and is now located in front of 1st Marine Division's current headquarters at Camp Pendleton, California, Building 3329, first occupied on November 16, 2023.

== Bibliography ==
- Larsson, Björn (15 November 2009). "Munson Line". Maritime Timetable Images. Björn Larsson.
- Maritime Administration. "Southern Cross". Ship History Database Vessel Status Card. U.S. Department of Transportation, Maritime Administration.
- Naval History And Heritage Command. "Wharton". Dictionary of American Naval Fighting Ships. Naval History And Heritage Command.
- Priolo, Gary P. (27 March 2020). "USS Wharton (AP-7)". NavSource.
- United States Shipping Board (1926). Tenth Annual Report of the United States Shipping Board. Washington.
- Villard, Harold G., ed. (1921). "U. S. Passenger Liners Are Given New Names". The Nautical Gazette. 100 (4 June 1921). New York: The Nautical Gazette, Inc.: 732.
