= USS Sudbury =

Cargo ship of the United States Navy

History

United States
- Name: Sudbury (1917–1927); Munbeaver (1927–1938); Capo Alba (1938–1944)
- Builder: Merchant Shipbuilding Corporation, Chester, Pennsylvania
- Yard number: 340
- Launched: 29 September 1917
- Completed: March 1918
- Acquired: 5 March 1918
- Commissioned: 5 March 1918
- Decommissioned: 11 April 1919
- Maiden voyage: 20 March 1918
- Stricken: 11 April 1919
- Identification: Official Number: 215991; Signal letters" LJQV
- Fate: Scuttled Nantes, France 18 August 1944, raised and broken up 1946.

General characteristics
- Type: Cargo ship
- Tonnage: 5,075 GRT
- Displacement: 10,400 tons
- Length: 402 ft 1 in (122.6 m) LOA; 384 ft 8 in (117.2 m) Registered
- Beam: 51 ft 2 in (15.6 m)
- Draft: 23 ft 10.5 in (7.3 m) (mean)
- Depth: 27 ft 7 in (8.4 m)
- Depth of hold: 25 ft 7 in (7.8 m)
- Propulsion: 1 Westinghouse steam turbine
- Speed: 11 kn (13 mph; 20 km/h)
- Complement: 52 (1918 reference); 104 (DANFS)
- Armament: 1 × 5-inch, 51 cal. (127-millimeter) gun; 1 × 6-pounder gun

USS Sudbury (ID-2149) was the cargo ship Sudbury under construction for the Shawmut Steamship Company that was taken over by the United States Navy on completion and in commission from 1918 to 1919. After naval service the ship was returned to Shawmut and operated by that company until its merger with companies that included the American Ship and Commerce Navigation Company and operated by that company until 1927. The ship was acquired by the Munson Steamship Line and operated by that company until sold to Cia Genovese di Nav a Vapori SA, Genoa, Italy and renamed Capo Alba.

The ship was in the Atlantic in 1941, taking refuge in the Canary Islands. The ship, along with a tanker, escaped Tenerife 1 April 1941 to the continent and was taken over by Germany 8 September 1943. Capo Alba was damaged by bombing at Nantes March 1944 and scuttled there 18 August 1944. The hulk was raised and broken up in 1946.

== Civilian cargo ship ==
=== Construction ===
Sudbury was built as a commercial cargo ship for the Shawmut Steamship Company in 1917 by the Merchant Shipbuilding Corporation, Chester, Pennsylvania as hull number 340. The ship, first of five new ships being built for Shawmut after the company sold all its older ships to France, was launched 29 September 1917.

Sudbury was an oil fueled, steam turbine driven ship with three Babcock & Wilcox boilers supplying steam to one Westinghouse turbine and fuel capacity of 955 tons of fuel oil. (Note: The reference used below, Hodgkinson, "Progress in Turbine Ship Propulsion," on page 194 notes the manufacturer as being Westinghouse Electric and Manufacturing Company. Current Wikipedia links to "Westinghouse" and its various components now do not accurately reflect this company. These were some of the early turbine drives for ships and the article notes the many advantages and a few problems with this then advanced ship propulsion system. This ship had fuel oil rather than vast coal bunkers and gangs of stokers and turbine instead of the usual reciprocal steam engine, making it advanced for the time. The reference has a detailed contemporary engineering view of these propulsion systems.) The ship was 5,075 GRT, 10,400 tons displacement, 402 ft 1 in (122.6 m) length overall, 384 ft 8 in (117.2 m) registered length, 51 ft 2 in (15.6 m) breadth, 27 ft 7 in (8.4 m) depth with a mean draft of 23 ft 10.5 in (7.3 m). (Note: The numbers are from both the Merchant Vessel Register and Construction & Repair Bureau sources. When there the expected slight differences the greater number is used. Such differences are expected even for the same measurement basis and usually a matter of inches.) When completed in March 1918 and registered Sudbury was issued official number 215991 with signal letters LJQV and Boston as home port.

== World War I Navy cargo ship ==
The U.S. Navy acquired Sudbury for World War I service on 5 March 1918, before any operation by Shawmut, and commissioned her the same day at Philadelphia, Pennsylvania, as USS Sudbury with the naval registry Identification Number (Id. No.) 2149. There is a discrepancy between the contemporary (1918) Ships' Data U.S. Naval Vessels and Dictionary of American Naval Fighting Ships on complement. The first has 10 officers, 52 men while the second has complement as 104. The ship was armed with one 5-inch, 51 caliber gun and one 6 pounder gun.

Assigned to the Naval Overseas Transportation Service, Sudbury loaded a cargo of United States Army supplies and departed Philadelphia on 20 March 1918 for New York City, where she joined a convoy that got underway for France on 24 March 1918. She arrived at Brest, France, on 8 April 1918. From there, she proceeded to Bordeaux, France, unloaded her cargo, and departed on 5 May 1918 for New York City. On the return from this maiden voyage there was a turbine casualty in which teeth were broken on the starboard unit and the vessel could make only 9 kn (10 mph; 17 km/h) using the low pressure turbine alone. The problem proved to be faulty material.

Sudbury made three more voyages to France in 1918. On 10 January 1919, Sudbury departed Philadelphia for Trieste. She completed the round-trip by arriving at Philadelphia on 3 April 1919 where, on 11 April 1919, Sudbury was decommissioned, stricken from the Navy List, and returned to the USSB.

== Post war cargo ship ==
The Shawmut Line again operated the ship until 1925 but the line had already been absorbed into W. Avril Harriman's interests which included the American Ship and Commerce Corporation. By 1925 the ship, with home port of New York, was operating under the American Ship and Commerce Navigation Company. in 1927 the ship was renamed Munbeaver owned by the Sudbury Steam Ship Corporation. (Note: The name, Munbeaver and soon to be Munson Steamship Line association with a corporation named for the ship's previous name may indicate a holding company during transition.) In 1930 the ship was operating for the Munson Steamship Line which operated the ship until sometime in 1937 when it is registered to Cia Genovese di Nav a Vapori SA, Genoa, Italy as Capo Alba.

== Fate ==
On 29 March 1941 Capo Alba was among the Italian shipping showing activity in the Canary Islands preparing to sail from Tenerife and on 1 April the ship sailed with the tanker Burano. The ship escaped successfully and was taken over by the German Navy 8 September 1943. Capo Alba was bombed and damaged at Nantes March 1944 and eventually scuttled there 18 August 1944. The hulk was raised and broken up in 1946.
