= USS Walter D. Munson =

Cargo ship of the United States Navy

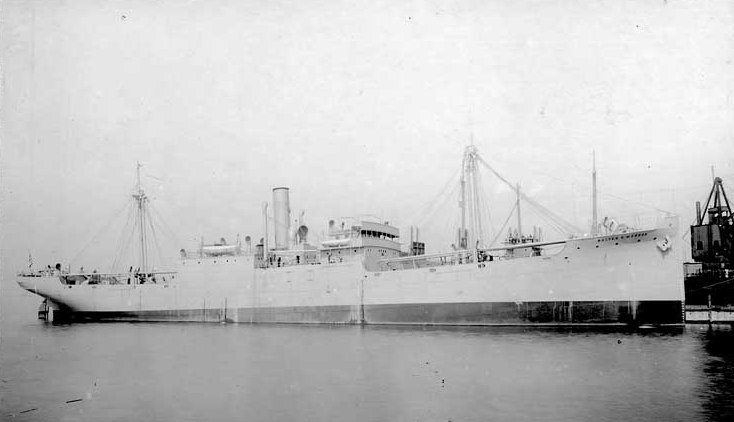
- SS Walter D. Munson, probably at the time of her completion in October 1917.

History

United States
- Name: USS Walter D. Munson
- Namesake: Previous name retained
- Builder: Bethlehem Steel Company, Sparrows Point, Maryland
- Launched: 4 August 1917
- Completed: October 1917
- Acquired: 15 April 1918
- Commissioned: 19 April 1918
- Decommissioned: 14 April 1919
- Fate: Transferred to United States Shipping Board for simultaneous return to owners 14 April 1919
- Notes: In commercial service as SS Walter D. Munson 1917-1918 and 1919-1940, and as SS Mount Kyllene 1940-1959 or 1960; Scrapped 1959 or 1960

General characteristics
- Type: Cargo ship
- Tonnage: 4,388 gross register tons
- Displacement: 8,375 tons
- Length: 384 ft 6 in (117.20 m)
- Beam: 48 ft 0 in (14.63 m) (waterline)
- Draft: 22 ft 6 in (6.86 m)
- Propulsion: Steam engine
- Speed: 12 knots
- Complement: 65
- Armament: 1 × 5-inch (127-millimeter) gun; 1 × 3-inch (76.2-millimeter) gun

USS Walter D. Munson (ID-1510) was a United States Navy cargo ship in commission from 1918 to 1919.

== Construction, acquisition, and commissioning ==
SS Walter D. Munson was built in 1917 at Sparrows Point, Maryland, by the Bethlehem Steel Company as a commercial cargo ship for the Munson Steamship Line. The United States Shipping Board acquired her from Munson for World War I service early in 1918 and transferred her to the U.S. Navy on 15 April 1918. The Navy assigned her the naval registry Identification Number (Id. No.) 1510 and commissioned her on 19 April 1918 as USS Walter D. Munson at New York City.

== United States Navy service, 1918-1919 ==
=== World War I service ===
Assigned to the Naval Overseas Transportation Service, Walter D. Munson loaded United States Army supplies at New York City and put to sea on 25 April 1918 with a convoy bound for France. She concluded her first Atlantic crossing in Navy service at Brest, France, on 10 May 1918 and moved on to Gironde on 13 May 1918, in which port she unloaded her cargo and took on ballast for the return voyage. On 27 May 1918, Walter D. Munson departed Gironde with a New York City-bound convoy. She entered New York on 7 June 1918.

After completing voyage repairs and loading another U.S. Army cargo, Walter D. Munson departed in an eastbound convoy for Europe on 18 June 1918 and arrived at Brest on 4 July 1918. This time, she unloaded a portion of her cargo at Brest before moving on to Gironde on 6 July 1918. She completed her unloading at Gironde, took on ballast, and stood out to sea on 24 July 1918. Her westbound convoy arrived at New York on 6 August 1918.

Walter D. Munson again made voyage repairs, loaded a cargo of U.S. Army supplies, and departed New York on 15 August 1918, arriving at Brest on 30 August 1918. On 31 August 1918, she was routed on to Le Havre, France, where she discharged her cargo. Before setting out back across the Atlantic, she visited Plymouth, England, where she topped off her bunkers with coal. Her return convoy rendezvoused on 10 September 1918, crossed the Atlantic, and stood into New York on 23 September 1918.

During a week at New York, Walter D. Munson completed another series of voyage repairs and loaded her fourth Europe-bound cargo. On 30 September 1918, she departed New York in convoy for France. She arrived at Le Havre on 16 October 1918, discharged her cargo there, and then headed back to the United States on 24 October 1918, arriving at New York on 6 November 1918.

=== Postwar service ===
Though hostilities ceased on 11 November 1918, Walter D. Munson completed her turnaround and, on 15 November 1918, started back across the Atlantic. She reached France at Quiberon Bay on 27 November 1918, discharged a portion of her cargo there, and then moved on to Nantes, where she unloaded the remainder. She stood out of Nantes on 6 December 1918 and headed for Brest, where she loaded a cargo of steel rails for return to the United States. She left Brest on 11 December 1918 and arrived in New York on 24 December 1918.

After unloading the steel rails, Walter D. Munson took on a cargo of commissary supplies and gasoline. On 8 January 1919, she set out upon her last round-trip voyage to Europe in commissioned U.S. Navy service. She entered Quiberon Bay on 24 January 1919 and, on 29 January 1919, continued on to Nantes where she discharged her cargo. She returned to sea 15 February 1919 and set a course for the Delaware Capes.

Walter D. Munson arrived at Philadelphia, Pennsylvania, on 7 March 1919 and there received word of her imminent demobilization. She was decommissioned on 14 April 1919 and simultaneously transferred to the United States Shipping Board for further simultaneous return to the Munson Steamship Line.

== Later career ==
Returning to commercial service once again as SS Walter D. Munson, the ship served with the Munson Steamship Line until 1940, when she was sold to the Greek firm Rethymnis and Kulukundis (Hellas) S.A. of Piraeus, Greece. Renamed SS Mount Kyllene, the ship remained in merchant service, operating out of Piraeus, until she was scrapped in 1959 or 1960 The Dictionary of American Naval Fighting Ships states that Mount Kyllene's "name disappeared from mercantile lists" in 1960.
