= SS Sierra Cordoba =

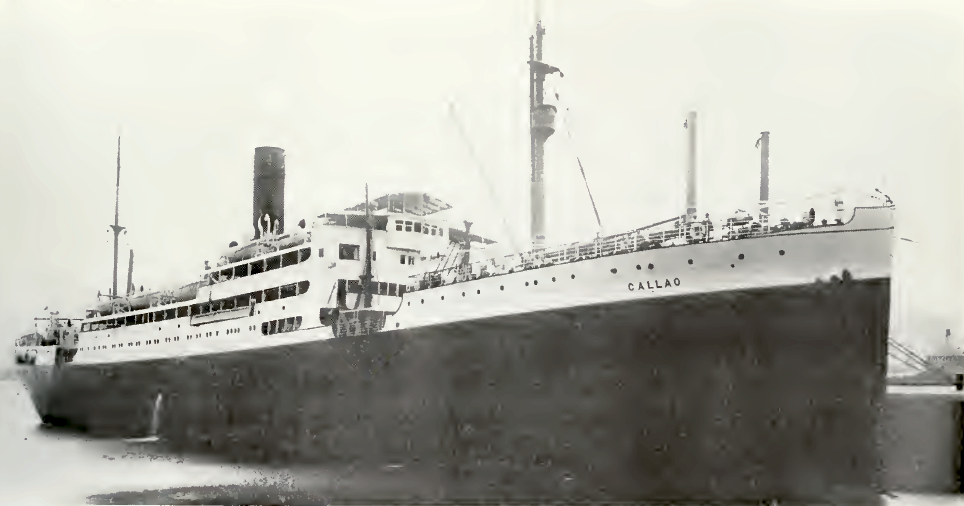
- S.S. Callao, 1919

History
- Name: Sierra Cordoba; Callao (1917–1923); Ruth Alexander (1923–1942)
- Owner: Norddeutscher Lloyd; Peru; United States Shipping Board; Dollar Line; American President Lines
- Port of registry: Bremen, Germany (1913–17); Callao, Peru (1917–18); (United States) New York/San Francisco (1918–41)
- Builder: AG Vulcan Stettin
- Fate: Sunk December 1941 off Balikpapan

General characteristics
- Tonnage: 8,226 GRT; 8,135 GRT
- Length: 461 ft (140.5 m) over all; 438 ft (133.5 m) between perpendiculars
- Beam: 55 ft 9 in (17.0 m)
- Draft: 26 ft 9 in (8.2 m)
- Depth: 37 ft 2 in (11.3 m)
- Decks: 4
- Propulsion: 2 x Triple expansion steam engines
- Speed: 13 knots (15 mph; 24 km/h)

SS Sierra Cordoba was a Norddeutscher Lloyd passenger and cargo ship completed 1913 by AG Vulcan Stettin. (Note: Launch may have been in late 1912 as the January 1913 issue of The Marine Engineer and Naval Architect (London) announced the ship "has just been successfully launched.") The ship operated between Bremen and Buenos Aires on the line's South American service and was equipped with wireless and "submarine sounding apparatus" (Note: Possibly the Fessenden oscillator as it was being developed in 1912.) with accommodations for 116 first class, 74 second class and 1,270 "between decks" passengers. A description after the ship had been seized and restored in 1919 noted she was among the fastest and best equipped ships of the line with accommodations for 115 first class passengers and 1,572 third and steerage class passengers as well as a crew of 179 officers and men. (Note: This account was after the ship had been refurbished and perhaps modified in Panama after seizure.)

During World War I Sierra Cordoba supplied German raiders, particularly SMS Dresden while hiding in the Straits of Magellan. After that ship and Sierra Cordoba moved northward in the Pacific, where the cruiser met British forces, the German liner interned herself in Callao, Peru, named Callao and later transferred to the United States Shipping Board, refurbished by Panama Canal personnel and briefly placed in commission with the United States Navy as USS Callao (ID-4036) to bring service people home from Europe. The ship was sold, renamed Ruth Alexander in 1923 and put into coastwise passenger and cargo service between Puget Sound and Mexico, typically calling at Seattle, Victoria, San Francisco, Los Angeles, San Diego and (by 1931) Ensenada, Mexico, until finally converted to a cargo ship in 1939.

On 9 December 1941 Ruth Alexander arrived in Manila the day after Manila had learned of the coming of war to the Pacific (8 December Manila time). The ship survived bombing raids in Manila harbor before attempting to escape on 28 December, as United States forces were retreating into Bataan, and being bombed and abandoned on 31 December. One crew member was lost, four wounded, and all survivors were picked up by a Dutch Dornier 24 bomber. The ship finally sank on 2 January.

== World War I ==
=== Supplying German raiders ===
During World War I Sierra Cordoba supplied German raiders in the South Atlantic and Pacific. On 23 November 1914 Sierra Cordoba had arrived in Montevideo with captured crews from the liner La Correntina and the French barque Union sunk by SS Kronprinz Wilhelm. The presence of German merchant vessels and the types of cargoes being loaded in neutral South American ports was taken as indication of German naval activity with Sierra Cordoba being loaded with coal at Montevideo on 22 November 1914 seen as significant.

Dresden, after escaping at the Battle of the Falkland Islands on 8 December, was sheltering in the waters south of the Straits of Magellan with British forces under Rear Admiral Archibald Stoddart actively searching for her location. Sierra Cordoba was then known to be a raider supply ship and had cleared Montevideo, supposedly for Callao, Peru on 18 December with supplies of coal and water. On 26 December in "Snug Bay" (Note: This appears to be an old term for a location that shows up rarely in searches. There is a recognized geographic name of Bahía Snug located at: 53° 50' 49" S, 071° 26' 48" W) Admiral Stoddart found Sierra Cordoba but could take no action beyond briefly boarding due to the fact a Chilean destroyer was observing his movements and it was presumed Chileans were observing the merchant vessel for neutrality violations. Sierra Cordoba joined Dresden and continued to supply the cruiser until 14 February 1915 when Dresden put to sea. Both ships moved northward off the coast of Chile, with the cruiser coaling several times, until Sierra Cordoba was dismissed after spending three days coaling the raider before heading into Valparaíso for coal. Sierra Cordoba departed Valparaíso on 7 March, coaled Dresden at Juan Fernández Islands 9 March, and eventually put into Callao as the cruiser had been sunk five days after the meeting.

=== Seizure and United States service ===
The ship was detained by Peru 17 March 1917 and renamed Callao. The Peruvian government turned Callao over to the United States Shipping Board (USSB) whereupon she was towed from Lima by the dredge Culebra to Balboa, Panama in October 1918 to be the first of five seized German vessels to be repaired by the Panama Canal Company's Mechanical Division correcting damage from long internment and sabotage done by their German crews. Sabotage included firing the boilers at full capacity without water in an effort to destroy them, prevented only by the superheating tubes, but still causing extensive damage, and damage to the engines. Repairs, including a completely new electrical system, were completed with the ship ready for sea on 5 April 1919. Callao transited the canal, loaded cargo at Cristobal and cleared for New York on 8 April. The USSB transferred Callao to U.S. Navy to be commissioned USS Callao (ID-4036) 26 April 1919, making two round trips to France to return personnel, whereupon she decommissioned 20 September 1919 at Norfolk, Virginia. Callao, then located at New York, was offered for sale at auction 7 November 1921 by USSB.

== Commercial service ==
The ship was purchased by Dollar Steamship Lines, chartered to the Admiral Line (Pacific Steamship Company) for coastal passenger service and renamed by the line's owner, H.F. Alexander, Ruth Alexander in 1923. The ship frequented the ports of Seattle, Victoria, San Francisco, Los Angeles and San Diego during this service and by 1931 had added Ensenada, Mexico. The U.S. Maritime Commission took over Dollar Line in 1939 and the ship was then converted to a cargo ship by American President Lines. According to one source the ship's registry was then changed to Panama. Lloyd's shows no registry change into 1941–1942 publication dates. (Note: Other sources, particularly those dealing with the ship's loss make no mention of "Panamanian" and others, such as USMM "U. S. Flag Ships including U.S. Maritime Commission ships" lost lists, indicate the ship was U.S. flag at that time.))

=== World War II and loss ===
On 9 December 1941 Ruth Alexander arrived in Manila from San Francisco to learn of the war coming to the Pacific. The ship survived three weeks of bombing in the harbor before attempting to escape on 28 December to Australia or any safe port. Manila had been declared an open city on 26 December, yet had been subject to massive air attacks and multiple waves of Japanese naval aircraft directed against the port and shipping on 27 December that continued on 28 December. The government and military, except for rear echelons of Army headquarters, had already evacuated to Bataan and Corregidor. Captain F. P. Willarts left under cover of darkness short seventeen men, all to become prisoners of war of which three died (two aboard the Japanese prisoner transport Arisan Maru), who were left ashore in the hurried escape. The ship was heading toward Borneo in the Dutch East Indies, an area already under attack and partially occupied by Japanese forces. During the transit from Manila to Balikpapan the ship was bombed and damaged by a Japanese flying boat in Makassar Strait on 31 December 1941, finally sinking on 2 January.

=== Crew rescue ===
Forty-eight survivors were rescued by a Dutch Dornier 24 on the day of the attack. A later account noted the Dutch bomber pilot had landed intent on a mass rescue and had dumped his bomb load, taken on survivors in three rafts to find the fourth, landed again picking up the occupants and taken off with fifty-five persons aboard including the seven bomber crew members. Survivors were landed at Tarakan where they remained a day before being flown to Balikpapan where another day was spent before being evacuated by ship to Surabaya arriving 4 January 1942. All crew but one still in hospital, who was taken prisoner of war and released September 1945, were evacuated by steamer about 24 January before the Japanese took Java in March. A Navy press release, number 26 of 9 January 1942, noted the ship had been abandoned and declared a total loss with one crew member killed and four injured.

== Bibliography ==
- American Merchant Marine at War (April 5, 2010). "American Merchant Marine Prisoners of War or Civilian Internees during World War II". USMM.org.
- "104 Rescued from Sea by Planes". Chicago Tribune. Vol. 16. Chicago. March 23, 1942.
- Corbett, Julian Stafford; Newbolt, Henry John (1918). Naval Operations. History of the Great War Based on Official Documents. Vol. 2. London: Longmans Green and Company.
- Cressman, Robert J. (1999). "The Official Chronology of the U.S. Navy in World War II". Contemporary History Branch, Naval Historical Center (now Naval History & Heritage Command).
- "Rival Fleets Approaching—Germans and British Both in South Atlantic". Duluth Evening Herald. Vol. 32. Duluth, Minnesota: The Herald Company. November 30, 1914.
- Gibson, R. H. (1918). Three Years of Naval Warfare. London: William Heinemann.
- Larsson, Björn (April 23, 2011). "Pacific Steamship Co. (The Admiral Line)". Maritime Timetable Images. Larsson.
- Lloyds. "Lloyd's Register 1932–33" (PDF). Lloyd's Register (through PlimsollShipData).
- Lloyds. "Lloyd's Register 1941–42" (PDF). Lloyd's Register (through PlimsollShipData).
- "Foreign Notes—Germany". The Marine Engineer and Naval Architect. 35. London. January 1913.
- Morton, Louis (1993). The War in the Pacific: The Fall Of The Philippines. United States Army In World War II. Washington, D.C.: Center Of Military History, United States Army. LCCN 53063678. Archived from the original on September 21, 2012.
- Moore Shipbuilding Company. "Ruth Alexander anchor chain blueprint. 1924, May 1" (PDF). National Park Service, Historic Documents Collection, San Francisco Maritime National Historical Park. Archived from the original (PDF) on May 11, 2009.
- Naval History And Heritage Command. "Callao (No. 4036) ii". Dictionary of American Naval Fighting Ships. Naval History And Heritage Command.
- "Navy Department Communiques And Pertinent Press Releases December 10, 1941 to May 24, 1945". ibiblio.org.
- "Chronology of the War, v. 3, April—June 1915". The New York Times Current History: The European War. Vol. 3. New York. 1917.
- "Extracts From the Log of the Dresden With Comments". The Naval Review, Volume 3. 1915.
- Pacific American Steamship Association; Shipowners Association of the Pacific Coast (June 1919). "Panama". Pacific Marine Review. 16. San Francisco: J.S. Hines.
- "Canal History—50 Years Ago". The Panama Canal Review. Balboa Heights, Canal Zone: Panama Canal Company. May 1969.
- Stone, Peter (1997). The Lady and the President. Yarram, Victoria, Australia: Oceans Enterprises. ISBN 0-9586657-2-9.
- "Invites Offers on S.S. Callao (ex-Sierra Cardoba)". United States Shipping Board. 1921.
- "Philip Nelson vs. American President Lines". United States. Court of Appeals (9th Circuit).
