= Supernumerary =

Supernumerary means "exceeding the usual number".

Supernumerary may also refer to:

- Supernumerary actor, a performer in a film, television show, or stage production who has no role or purpose other than to appear in the background, more commonly referred to as an "extra"
- Supernumerary body part, most commonly a congenital disorder involving the growth of an additional part of the body and a deviation from the body plan
- Supernumerary judge, a semi-retired judge appointed to hear cases on a part-time basis
- Supernumerary rainbow, extra colored bands sometimes seen inside the arc of a rainbow
- Jewish Supernumerary Police, a Jewish militia active in the British Mandate of Palestine
- Small supernumerary marker chromosome (sSMC), an extra, 47th autosomal chromosome
- Supernumerary sex (or supernumerary gender), a gender category beyond male and female
- Supernumerary town, a town in the Russian Empire which was not a center of an administrative subdivision of the state

== See also ==
- Supernumeraries, a 2023 album by Ezra Williams
