= Ascension (ship) =

Ascension is the name of several ships

- HMS Ascension (K502), Colony-class frigate, formerly USS Hargood (PF-74)
- MV Ascension, cargo and container ship, U.S.-flagged and Turkish-built, formerly MV Chekov

== Fictional ==
- Project Ascension, project to create and use Orion-class spaceships from Ascension (TV series)
  - USS Ascension, fictional spaceship setting from Ascension (TV series)
