= SS Sea Arrow =

SS Sea Arrow may refer to one of several Type C3 ships built for the United States Maritime Commission:

- SS Sea Arrow (1939) (MC hull number 51, Type C3), built by Moore Dry Dock; delivered July 1940; sold 1961; scrapped in 1974
- SS Sea Arrow (1943) (MC hull number 281, Type C3-S-A2), built by Western Pipe and Steel; acquired by the United States Navy and converted to Bayfield-class attack transport USS Alpine (APA-92); sold for commercial service in 1948; scrapped in 1971
