= MV Cpl. Louis J. Hauge Jr. =

Cpl. Louis J. Hauge Jr.-class dry cargo ship

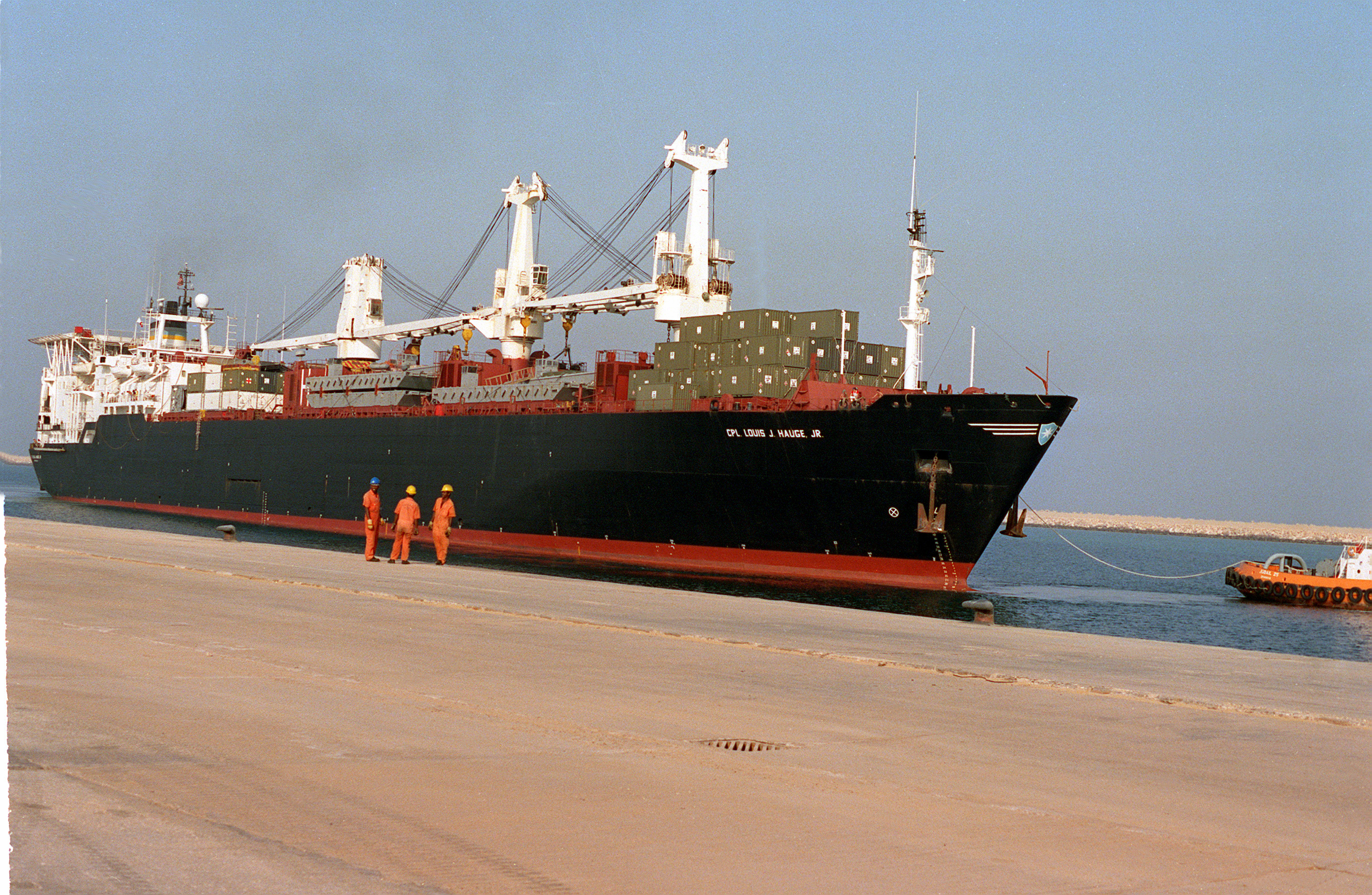
- MV Cpl. Louis J. Hauge Jr.

History

United States
- Name: Cpl. Louis J. Hauge Jr.
- Namesake: Louis J. Hauge Jr.
- Owner: Maersk Line (1979–2009); Sealift Inc. (2009–2010)
- Builder: Odense Staalskibsvaerft A/S
- Launched: 3 August 1979
- Completed: 1979
- Acquired: 1979
- Renamed: Estelle Mærsk (1979–1984); Abby G (2009–2010)
- Identification: IMO number: 7702047; MMSI number: 369591000; Callsign: NLJH; Hull number: AK-3000
- Honours and awards: See Awards
- Fate: Scrapped, 2010

General characteristics
- Class & type: Cpl. Louis J. Hauge Jr.-class cargo ship
- Displacement: 23,365 t (22,996 long tons), light; 46,484 t (45,750 long tons), full
- Length: 755 ft 5 in (230.25 m)
- Beam: 90 ft 0 in (27.43 m)
- Draft: 33 ft 10 in (10.31 m)
- Installed power: 1 × shaft; 16,800 hp (12,500 kW)
- Propulsion: 2 × Sulzer 7RND76M diesel engines; 2 × boilers
- Speed: 16.4 knots (30.4 km/h; 18.9 mph)
- Capacity: 120,080 sq. ft. vehicle; 1,283,000 gallons petroleum; 65,000 gallons water; 332 TEU
- Complement: 25 mariners and 11 technicians
- Aviation facilities: Helipad

MV Cpl. Louis J. Hauge Jr. (AK-3000), (former MV Estelle Mærsk), was the lead ship of the Cpl. Louis J. Hauge Jr.-class cargo ship built in 1979. The ship is named after Corporal Louis J. Hauge Jr., an American Marine who was awarded the Medal of Honor during World War II.

== Construction and commissioning ==
The ship was built in 1979 at the Odense Staalskibsvaerft A/S, Lindø, Denmark. She was put into the service of Maersk Line as Estelle Mærsk.

In 1984 , she was acquired and chartered by the Navy under a long-term contract as MV Cpl. Louis J. Hauge Jr. (AK-3000). The ship underwent conversion at the Bethlehem Steel at Sparrows Point, Maryland. She was assigned to Maritime Prepositioning Ship Squadron 3 and supported the US Marine Corps Expeditionary Brigade. On 1 May 1986, the ship was anchored in Subic Bay during Exercise Freedom Banner 1986.

On 16 August 1990, Cpl. Louis J. Hauge Jr. carried equipment that would later be used during Operation Desert Storm.

On 20 August 2008, she was part of the Southeast Asia Cooperation Against Terrorism (SEACAT) exercises. In 2009, the ship returned to Maersk Line as MV Abby G. Sealift Inc. later acquired the ship in 2010 and operated the ship with the same name until August of later that year, in which she was towed to Alang, India for scrap.

== Awards ==
- National Defense Service Medal
