= USS Grafton (APA-109) =

1944 Bayfield-class attack transport

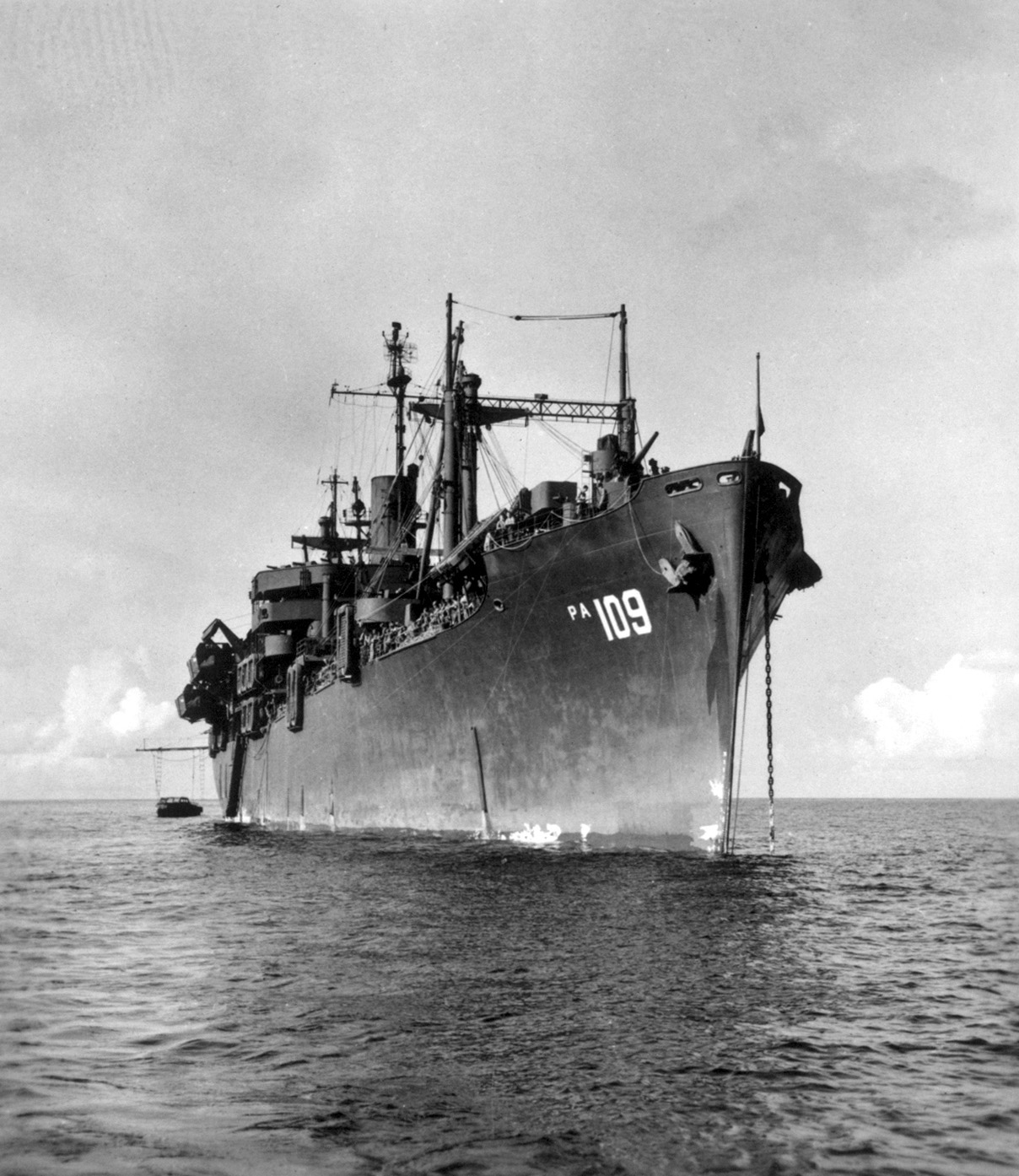
- USS Grafton (APA-109), at anchor, Kossol Passage, Palau, 14 May 1945.

History

United States
- Name: USS Grafton
- Namesake: Grafton County, New Hampshire
- Builder: Western Pipe & Steel
- Laid down: 3 March 1944
- Launched: 10 August 1944
- Christened: Sea Sparrow
- Acquired: 31 December 1944
- Commissioned: 5 January 1945
- Decommissioned: 16 May 1946
- Renamed: USS Grafton, Java Mail, Carrier Dove.
- Honours and awards: One battle star for service in World War II.
- Fate: Scrapped 28 May 1974
- Notes: WPS Hull No. 131.; US MC Hull No. 1554.; Type C3-S-A2.; Sponsor Mrs S. Belither.

General characteristics
- Class & type: Bayfield-class attack transport
- Displacement: 8,100 tons, 16,100 tons fully loaded
- Length: 492 ft (150 m)
- Beam: 69 ft 6 in (21.18 m)
- Draught: 26 ft 6 in (8.08 m)
- Propulsion: General Electric geared turbine, 2 x Foster Wheeler D-type boilers, single propeller, designed shaft horsepower 8,500
- Speed: 18 knots
- Complement: 51 officers, 524 enlisted. Troop capacity 80 officers, 1,146 enlisted
- Armament: 2 × single 5 inch/38 cal. dual purpose gun mounts, one fore and one aft, 2 x twin 40mm AA gun mounts forward, port and starboard; 2 × single 40 mm AA gun mounts.; 18 × single 20mm AA gun mounts.

USS Grafton (APA-109) was a Bayfield-class attack transport which served with the United States Navy from 1945 to 1946. She was sold into commercial service in 1947 and was scrapped in 1975.

== History ==
Originally laid down in San Francisco by Western Pipe & Steel as a Type C3-S-A2 cargo ship named Sea Sparrow, the ship was renamed USS Grafton during construction and completed as an attack transport designation APA-109. Grafton was commissioned on 5 January 1945.

=== Pacific War ===
After a 10-day period loading supplies and landing craft at Oakland, California, Grafton conducted her shakedown training off San Pedro before undergoing amphibious training between 3 and 19 February. Subsequently, Grafton departed on 10 April for Pearl Harbor with 1,000 Seabees on board, arriving on the 16th. At Pearl Harbor the vessel took on more Seabees, and departed on 27 April for Samar in the Philippine Islands via Eniwetok and Kossel Roads, disembarking her passengers at the destination on 17 May 1945.

By this time the Battle of Okinawa was drawing to a close, so Grafton departed Samar on 24 May to pick up a B-24 bomber service group in the Palaus and transport them to the newly conquerend Japanese island. On 24 June Grafton arrived at Okinawa and disembarked her passengers before anchoring off the Hagushi beaches. Over the next four nights, the US Naval assault fleet was subjected to heavy air attacks, which Grafton helped repel with her antiaircraft guns. This was destined to be Grafton's one and only combat mission.

On 28 June Grafton took on board 1,000 Japanese prisoners of war, and then sailed via Saipan to Pearl Harbor, where she offloaded them on 13 July. On 16 July, Grafton sailed for San Francisco with a cargo of wounded, arriving on 22 July.

On 7 August Grafton sailed again for Pearl Harbor with a cargo of fresh troops, but with the surrender of Japan, the ship embarked elements of the 5th Marine Division at Pearl Harbor, and set out on 1 September for the Japanese homeland where the Division was now headed for occupation duties. Sailing via Saipan, Grafton arrived at Sasebo on 22 September, where the Marines were disembarked with their equipment. The ship then set out for Lingayen Gulf via Manila to pick up more occupation troops headed for Japan. On 3 October the vessel set out once more for Sassebo with her new passengers, passing Okinawa only two days after the great typhoon which devastated the island, and arriving at her destination on 15 October where the troops were disembarked.

=== Operation Magic Carpet ===
On 22 October Grafton was reassigned for Operation Magic Carpet, the major transport operation undertaken for the purpose of returning millions of US servicemen to the United States. Grafton arrived at Saipan on 27 October, where she embarked 1,700 servicemen for passage to San Francisco. Arriving there on 11 November, she disembarked her passengers and then began the first of two passages to Guam to pick up more returning veterans. On 11 February 1946, Grafton arrived at Seattle with her final transport of returning servicemen.

=== Decommissioning and fate ===
Following the end of Magic Carpet, Grafton sailed for Norfolk, Virginia via the Panama Canal and San Francisco, arriving in Hampton Roads on 21 March 1946. On 16 May she was decommissioned, and the next day returned for disposal to the US Maritime Commission.

In 1947, the Maritime Commission sold Grafton to American Mail Lines, who registered her at Portland, Oregon and dubbed her Java Mail. She continued with that company until 1969, when she was sold on to Waterman Steamship Corporation who named her Carrier Dove. The vessel remained in service with Waterman Steamship until 1974, when she was sold to Taiwanese interests and scrapped at Kaohsiung on 28 May of the same year.
