= SS Tufts Victory =

Victory ship of the United States

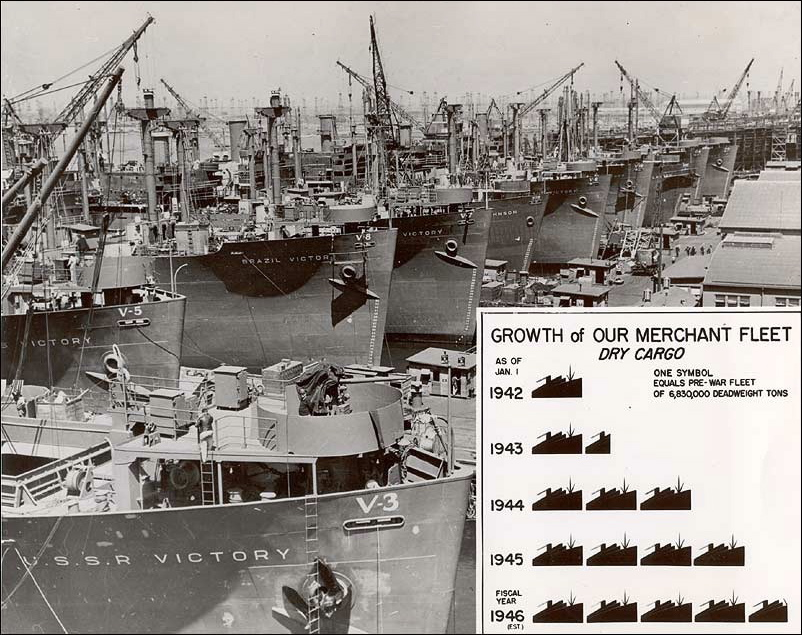
- California Shipbuilding Company

History

United States
- Name: Tufts Victory
- Namesake: Tufts University
- Owner: Maritime Commission
- Operator: War Shipping Administration through American Mail Line
- Builder: California Shipbuilding Company, Los Angeles
- Laid down: 11 January 1945
- Launched: 2 March 1945
- Completed: 28 March 1945
- Identification: Official number: 247512
- Fate: Wrecked on 23 September 1969

General characteristics
- Class & type: VC2-S-AP3 Victory ship
- Tonnage: 7612 GRT, 4,553 NRT
- Displacement: 15,200 tons
- Length: 455 ft (139 m)
- Beam: 62 ft (19 m)
- Draught: 28 ft (8.5 m)
- Installed power: 8,500 shp (6,300 kW)
- Propulsion: HP & LP turbines geared to a single 20.5-foot (6.2 m) propeller, by Westinghouse Electric & Mfg. Co., Essington
- Speed: 16.5 knots
- Boats & landing craft carried: 4 Lifeboats
- Complement: 62 Merchant Marine and 28 US Naval Armed Guards
- Armament: During World War 2; 1 × 5 inch (127 mm)/38 caliber gun as Victory ship; 1 × 3 inch (76 mm)/50 caliber gun; 8 × 20 mm Oerlikon

SS Tufts Victory was a Victory ship built during World War II under the Emergency Shipbuilding program. She was launched by the California Shipbuilding Company on 2 March 194. The ship was completed and delivered to the wartime operator of all United States oceangoing shipping, the War Shipping Administration (WSA), on 28 March 1945. Tufts Victory, official number 247512, was assigned to American Mail Line, under a standard WSA operating agreement at that time. That agreement continued until the ship's sale in 1947. The ship's United States Maritime Commission designation was VC2-S-AP3, hull number 771. Tufts Victory was converted from a cargo ship to a troopship to bring troops home after the war as part of Operation Magic Carpet.

Tufts Victory was one of the new 10,500-ton class ship to be known as Victory ships. Victory ships were designed to replace the earlier Liberty Ships. Liberty ships were designed to be used just for World War II. Victory ships were designed to last longer and serve the US Navy after the war. The Victory ship differed from a Liberty ship in that they were: faster, longer and wider, taller, had a thinner stack set farther toward the superstructure and had a long raised forecastle. The ship's namesake is for Tufts University on the border of Medford and Somerville, Massachusetts. The SS Tufts Victory was a Victory ship laId down on 11 January 1945 and one of a series of ships named for American colleges and universities.

Typical Victory ship

== World War II ==
Tufts Victory served as a troopship taking troops to and from Europe. Tufts Victory and 96 other Victory ships were converted to troopships take troops to Europe. Later she was used to bring the US soldiers home as part of Operation Magic Carpet from port cities known as Cigarette Camps. She was able to transport up to 1,500 troops to and from Europe. Her cargo holds were converted to bunk beds and hammocks stack three high for hot bunking. In the cargo hold Mess halls and exercise places were also added.

== Post war ==
After the war, she was laid up at the Suisun Bay Reserve Fleet in 1947. In 1947 she was sold the Rotterdam Lloyd company (became Nedlloyd later) of Rotterdam and renamed the SS Samarinda. In 1962 she was sold to the Far Eastern Navigation Corporation of Keelung, Taiwan and renamed SS Chun Lee. In 1964 she was rename SS Cherry Victory. On 23 September 1969 Cherry Victory ran aground at Sumatra in the Strait of Malacca at 5.1700°N 97.280°E. She as refloated, but not worth repairing, she was scrapped at Keelung in 1970.

== SS Samarinda (1912) ==
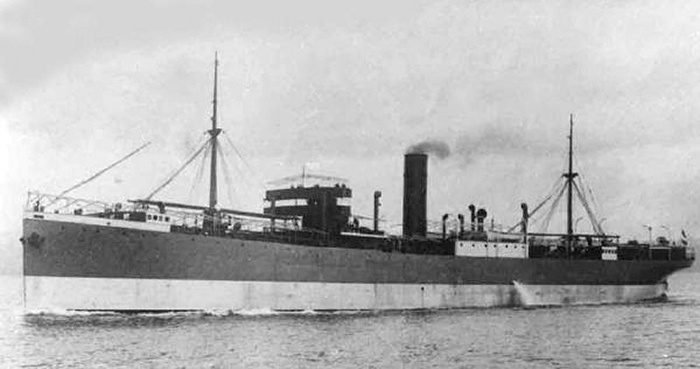
SS Samarinda built in 1912

The first Koninklijke Rotterdamsche Lloyd (Rotterdam Lloyd) ship with the name SS Samarinda was a 6,825 gross register ton (12,300 tons displacement) cargo ship. She was built at Port Glasgow, Scotland, was built in 1912. In 1918 she was seized by United States Government 20 March 1918 at New York under the right of angary for World War I uses as a military transport, for troops, good and then 550 horses. On 14 May 1919 she was returned to Rotterdam Lloyd. In 1932 the SS Samarinda (1912) was scrapped at Ghent, Belgium.

== See also ==
- List of Victory ships
- Liberty ship
- Type C1 ship
- Type C2 ship
- Type C3 ship

== Sources ==
- Sawyer, L.A. and W.H. Mitchell. Victory ships and tankers: The history of the ‘Victory’ type cargo ships and of the tankers built in the United States of America during World War II, Cornell Maritime Press, 1974, 0-87033-182-5.
- United States Maritime Commission: Victory Ships alphabetical list War II
- Victory Cargo Ships Oregon Shipyards Record Breakers Page 2
