= Bernard F. Fisher =

US Air Force officer and Medal of Honor recipient

Bernard Francis Fisher
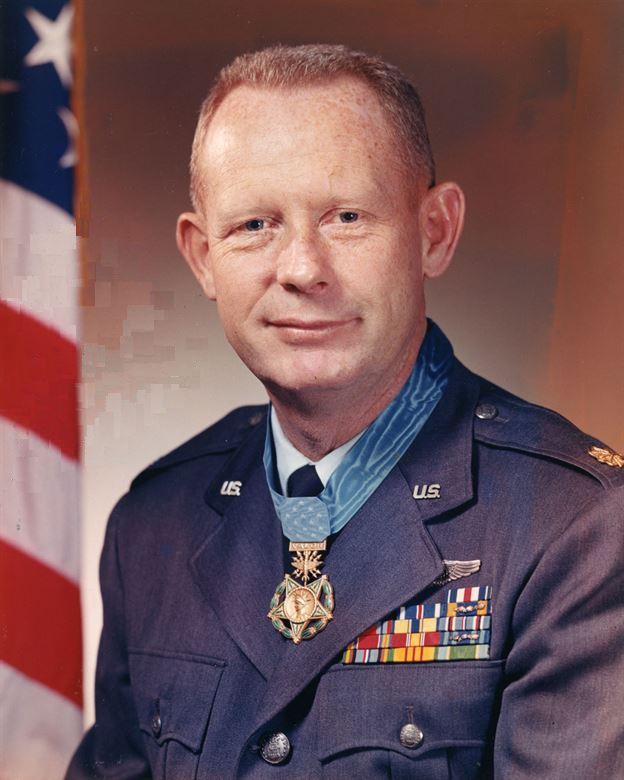
- Born: January 11, 1927; San Bernardino, California, U.S.
- Died: August 16, 2014 (aged 87); Boise, Idaho, U.S.
- Burial place: Idaho State Veterans Cemetery; Boise, Idaho
- Military career
- Allegiance: United States of America
- Branch: United States Navy Idaho Air National Guard United States Air Force
- Service years: 1945 – 1946 (USN); 1947 – 1951 (ANG); 1951 – 1974 (USAF)
- Rank: Colonel
- Nickname: Bernie
- Unit: 1st Air Commando Squadron
- Conflicts: Vietnam War
- Awards: Medal of Honor; Silver Star; Legion of Merit; Distinguished Flying Cross; Meritorious Service Medal (2); Air Medal (8)

Bernard Francis "Bernie" Fisher (pronounced Bernerd) (January 11, 1927 – August 16, 2014) was a United States Air Force officer and a recipient of the U.S. military's highest decoration, the Medal of Honor. He was the first Air Force member to receive the medal in the Vietnam War.

== Early life ==
Born in 1927 in San Bernardino, California, Fisher was raised and educated in Utah, calling Clearfield home. He served briefly in the Navy at the end of World War II, enrolled at Boise Junior College in 1947, and transferred to the University of Utah in Salt Lake City in 1949. He was a member of the Church of Jesus Christ of Latter-day Saints.

== Military service ==
From 1947 to 1951, Fisher was a member of the Idaho Air National Guard. Before he was able to complete his undergraduate degree at the University of Utah, he was commissioned into the Air Force in 1951. After pilot training, he served as a jet fighter pilot in the Air Defense Command until 1965, when he volunteered for duty in Vietnam. From July 1965 through June 1966, he flew 200 combat sorties in the A-1E/H "Spad" Skyraider as a member of the 1st Air Commando Squadron located at Pleiku Air Base, South Vietnam.

=== Medal of Honor ===
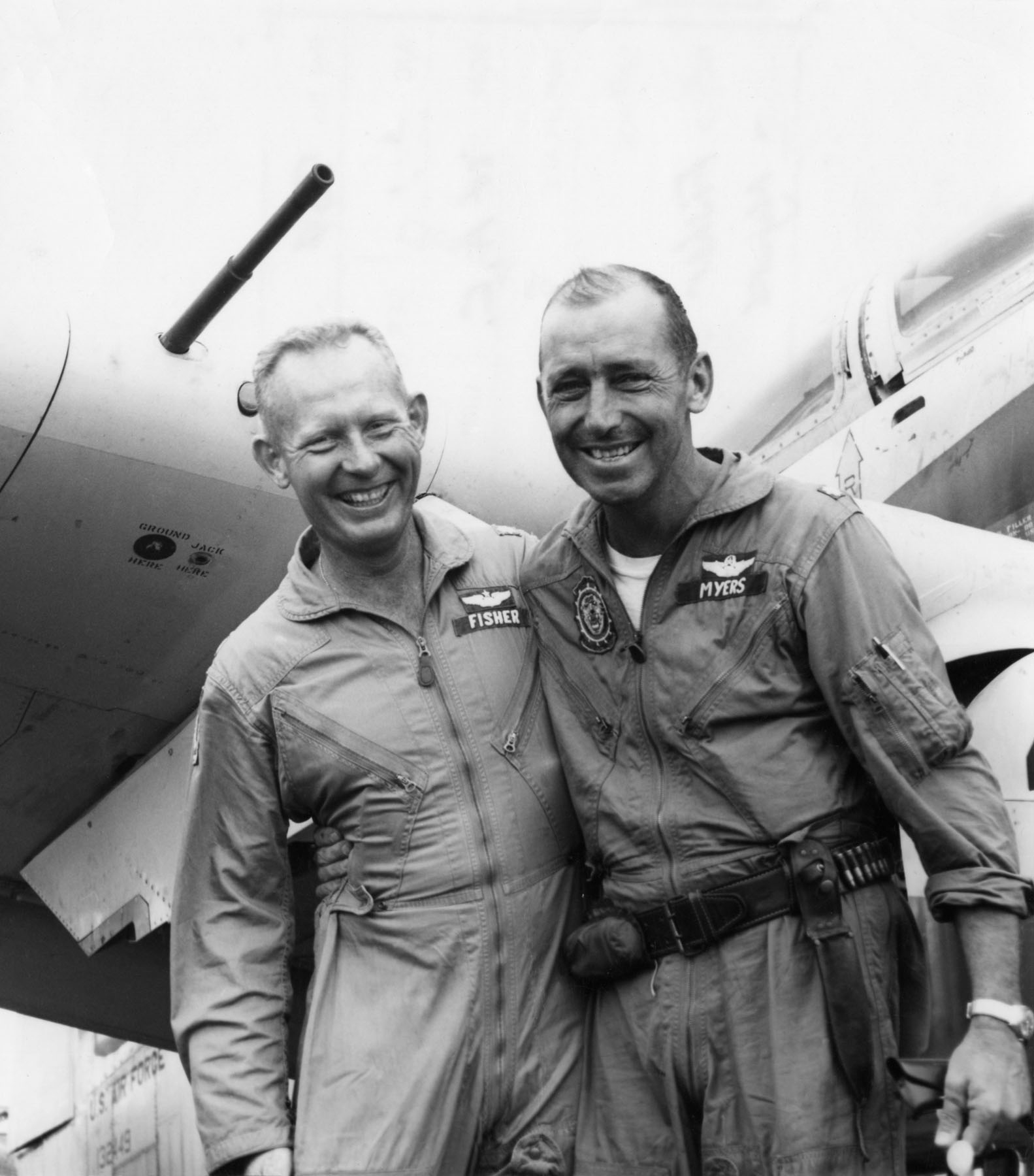
Fisher and Myers after the rescue

During March 10, 1966, he led a two-ship element of Skyraiders to the A Shau Valley to support troops in contact with the enemy. Six "Spads" were striking numerous emplacements when the A-1 piloted by Major Dafford Wayne "Jump" Myers (1919–1992) was hit and forced to crash-land on the airstrip of a CIDG-Special Forces camp. Myers bellied in on the 2,500-foot runway and took cover behind an embankment on the edge of the strip while Fisher directed the rescue effort. Since the closest helicopter was 30 minutes away and the enemy was only 200 yards (180 m) from Myers, Fisher quickly decided to land his two-seat A-1E on the strip and pick up his friend. Under the cover provided by the other A-1s, he landed in the valley, taxied to Myers' position, and loaded the downed airman into the empty seat. Dodging shell holes and debris on the steel-planked runway, Fisher took off safely despite many hits on his aircraft by small-arms fire.

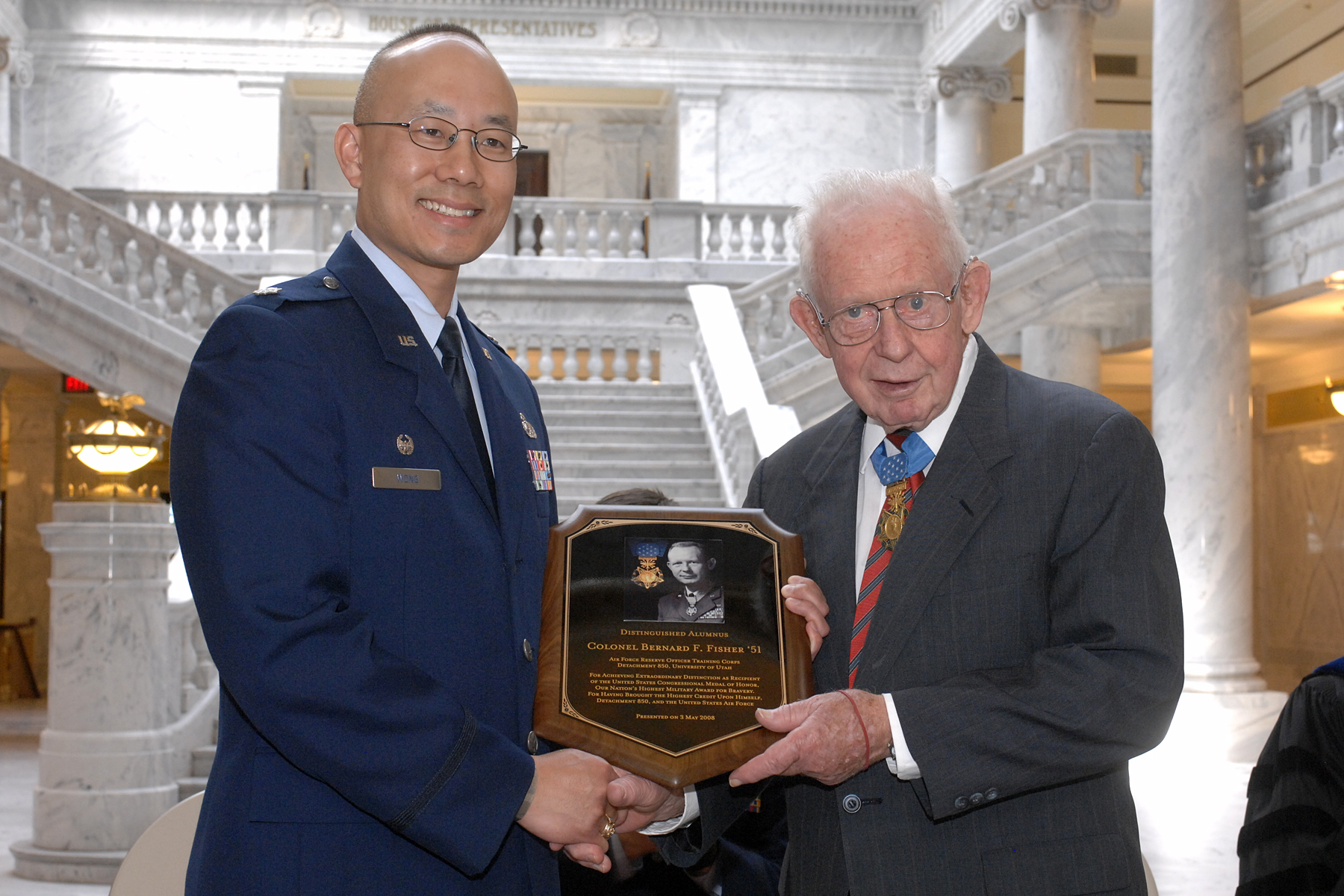
Fisher accepts Detachment 850 Distinguished Alumnus award

The rescue at A Shau was similar to an event that occurred on August 4, 1944, during World War II. On that date, an P-38 piloted by Captain Richard "Dick" Willsie (1920–2013) was damaged by flak near Ploieşti, Romania. After both engines failed, Willsie crash-landed but was rescued from capture when Flight Officer Richard "Dick" Andrews (1924–2007) landed his P-38 on the field, squeezed Willsie into the cockpit, and flew back to base. By remarkable coincidence, both Willsie and Andrews were also involved in the A Shau rescue. Willsie was the commanding officer of the 602nd Air Commando Squadron to which Myers was assigned, and Andrews flew top cover during the entire rescue.

Fisher had earned a Silver Star the day before while flying support for the same battle.

Fisher returned to the United States, and, on January 19, 1967, was awarded the Medal of Honor by President Lyndon B. Johnson

=== Post-Vietnam service ===
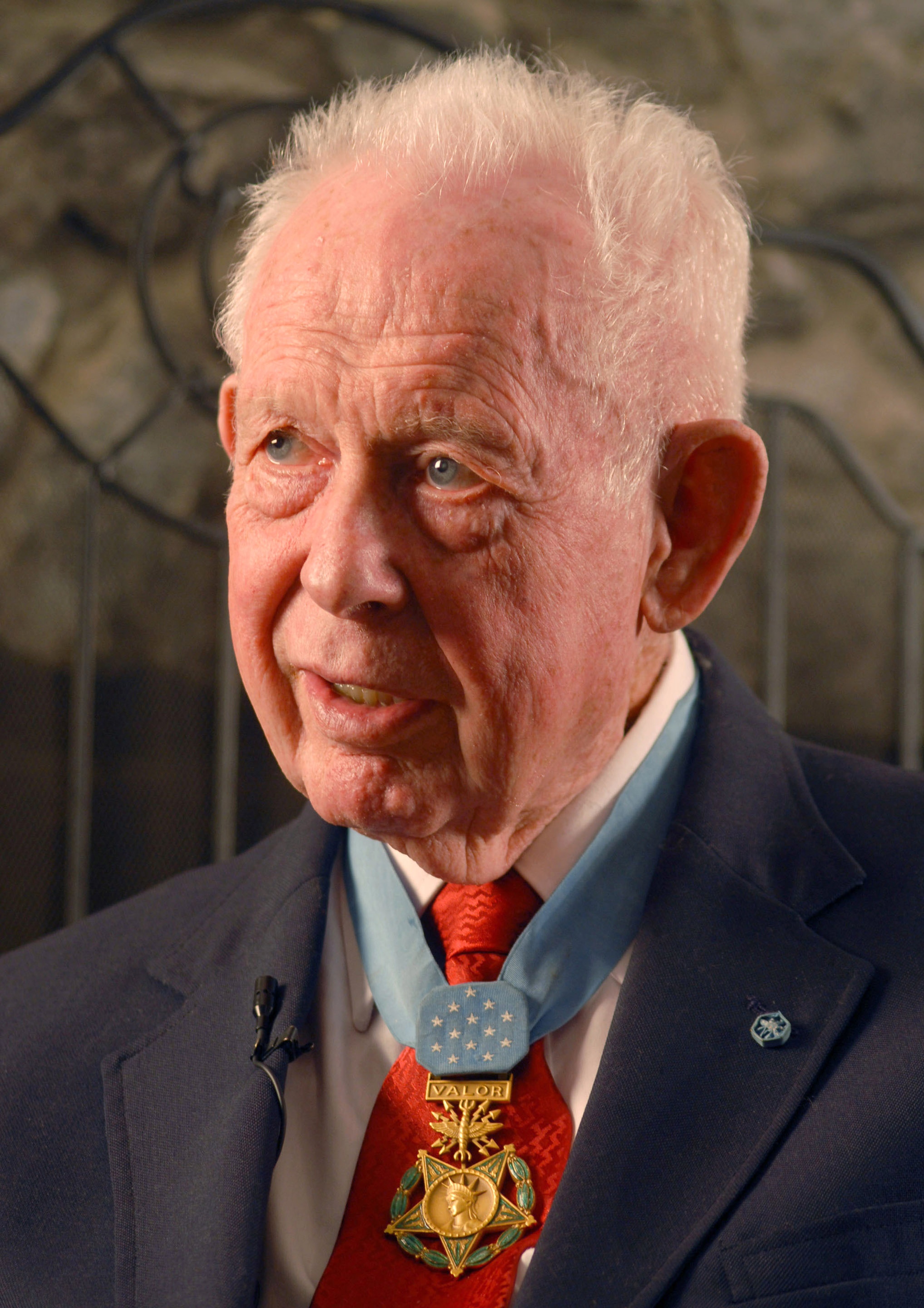
Fisher during an interview in 2008

Fisher returned to the Air Defense Command and flew jet interceptors. He served with the 496th Fighter Interceptor Squadron out of Hahn Air Base, West Germany, and then with the 525th Fighter Interceptor Squadron at Bitburg Air Base, West Germany.

In October 1969, he became Operations Officer with the 87th Fighter Interceptor Squadron at Duluth International Airport, Minnesota, serving in this squadron until June 1971, when he became Senior Air Force Advisor for the 25th Air Division at Gowen Air National Guard Base in Boise, Idaho, until his retirement from the Air Force on June 30, 1974.

== Later years ==
Fisher retired to his hometown of Kuna, Idaho, where he lived with his wife Realla until her death on April 27, 2008.

In 1985 and again in 2005, Fisher was inducted into the Gathering of Eagles program and told the story of the rescue during the Battle of A Shau to groups of young military officers.

On May 3, 2008, Fisher received his diploma from the University of Utah, 57 years after attending classes. He was officially recognized for his past academic achievements and decorated military career.

He died on August 16, 2014.

== Awards and decorations ==

US Air Force Command Pilot Badge
Medal of Honor	Silver Star	Legion of Merit
Distinguished Flying Cross	Meritorious Service Medal w/ 1 bronze oak leaf cluster	Air Medal w/ 1 silver and 2 bronze oak leaf clusters
Air Force Commendation Medal	Combat Readiness Medal	American Campaign Medal
World War II Victory Medal	National Defense Service Medal w/ 1 bronze service star	Armed Forces Expeditionary Medal
Vietnam Service Medal w/ 3 bronze campaign stars	Air Force Longevity Service Award w/ 4 bronze oak leaf clusters	Small Arms Expert Marksmanship Ribbon
Republic of Vietnam Gallantry Cross w/ Gold Star	Republic of Vietnam Gallantry Cross	Vietnam Campaign Medal

=== Medal of Honor Citation ===
Fisher's official Medal of Honor citation reads:

For conspicuous gallantry and intrepidity at the risk of his life above and beyond the call of duty. On that date, the special forces camp at A Shau was under attack by 2,000 North Vietnamese Army regulars. Hostile troops had positioned themselves between the airstrip and the camp. Other hostile troops had surrounded the camp and were continuously raking it with automatic weapons fire from the surrounding hills. The tops of the 1,500-foot hills were obscured by an 800 foot ceiling, limiting aircraft maneuverability and forcing pilots to operate within range of hostile gun positions, which often were able to fire down on the attacking aircraft. During the battle, Maj. Fisher observed a fellow airman crash land on the battle-torn airstrip. In the belief that the downed pilot was seriously injured and in imminent danger of capture, Maj. Fisher announced his intention to land on the airstrip to effect a rescue. Although aware of the extreme danger and likely failure of such an attempt, he elected to continue. Directing his own air cover, he landed his aircraft and taxied almost the full length of the runway, which was littered with battle debris and parts of an exploded aircraft. While effecting a successful rescue of the downed pilot, heavy ground fire was observed, with 19 bullets striking his aircraft. In the face of the withering ground fire, he applied power and gained enough speed to lift-off at the overrun of the airstrip. Maj. Fisher's profound concern for his fellow airman, and at the risk of his life above and beyond the call of duty are in the highest traditions of the U.S. Air Force and reflect great credit upon himself and the Armed Forces of his country.

== Honors ==
Fisher is the namesake of Colonel Bernard Fisher Veterans Memorial Park in Kuna, Idaho; Fisher Park in Clearfield, Utah; the Bernard Fisher Highway, a portion of Utah State Route 193 that passes near Hill Air Force Base; and the Bernard F. Fisher Room, located at the 353d Special Operations Group at Kadena Air Base, Japan, and displaying special operations memorabilia. In 1999, a Military Sealift Command vessel, the MV Maj. Bernard F. Fisher (T-AK-4396) was named for him. In 2010 the Boise Rescue Mission started a homeless veterans transitional living program. With permission from Col. Fisher, the Motto of the program is Colonel Fisher's famous quote after he rescued his comrade: "When a man is down, you don't leave him there." The statement is on the wall of the entrance to the living quarters of the River of Life Mission in Boise.

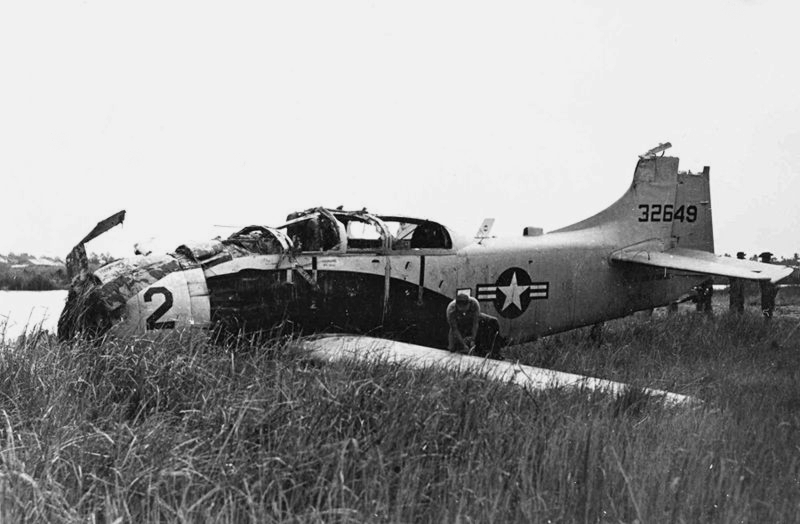
Fisher's damaged A-1E

The A-1 Skyraider (AF Ser. No. 52-132649) that Fisher flew into the A Shau Valley was saved and restored and is on display at the National Museum of the United States Air Force at Wright-Patterson AFB in Dayton, Ohio.

His past AFROTC Detachment, Detachment 850, has been dubbed the Skyraiders after him.

== See also ==
- List of Medal of Honor recipients for the Vietnam War
