= SS Wilson (1968) =

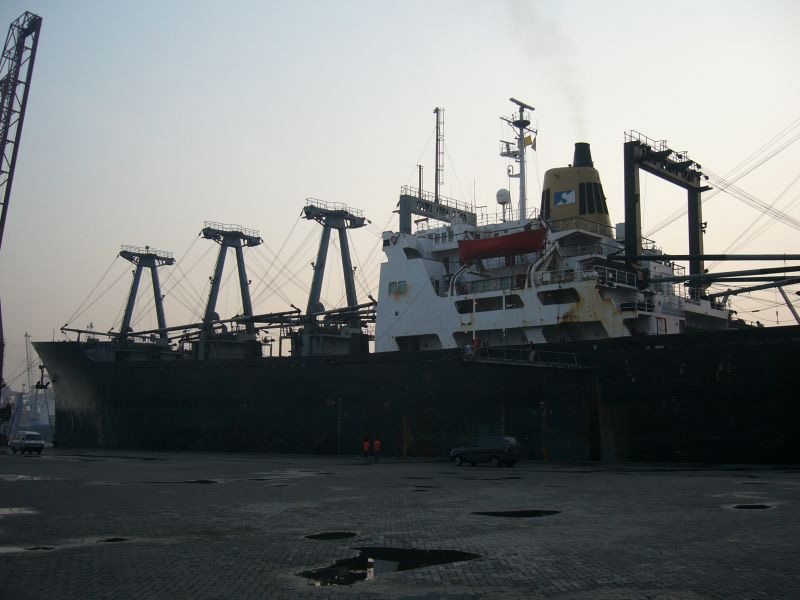
- center

History
- Name: Hong Kong Mail (1968–1978); President Wilson (1978–1987); Sue Lykes (1987–1995)
- Owner: Sealift Incorporated
- Port of registry: US
- Laid down: 29 October 1968
- Launched: 8 February 1969
- Completed: 1 July 1969
- Identification: IMO number: 6909911; Call sign: WNPD
- Fate: Scrapped June 2008.

General characteristics
- Type: Cargo ship
- Tonnage: 15,836 GT 9,384 NT
- Length: 184.404 m (605.00 ft)
- Beam: 24.9936 m (82.000 ft)
- Depth: 14.161 m (46.46 ft)

SS Wilson was a steam-powered general cargo ship owned by the American company Sealift Incorporated. The ship's keel was laid in 1968, and it was delivered in 1969. Registered under the US flag, its port of registry is Dover, Delaware. The ship was known as Hong Kong Mail until 1978, then President Wilson until 1987, and Sue Lykes until 1995. Its IMO number is 6909911 and its call sign is WNPD. She was classed as a Type C5 class ship, type C5-S-75a. SS Wilson and other C5-S-75a ships were built by Newport News Shipbuilding & Drydock Company at Newport News, Virginia for the American Mail Line of Seattle, Washington. C5-S-75a ships were built as break bulk cargo or Container ship, with 21,600 shp at 15,950 tons and a max speed of 21.0 knots. These were the largest general cargo liners at its time in 1969.

== Sister ships ==
The SS Wilson had four sister ships. Her sister ship are:

  - Hong Kong Mail built 1968, renamed SS Wilson in 1978, scrapped June of 2008.
  - Alaskan Mail 1968, renamed SS Cape Girardeau 1978, then SS Cape Girardeau (T-AK 2039) in 1988. National Defense Reserve Fleet since October of 2008
  - Indian Mail renamed SS Cape Gibson (AK-5051), National Defense Reserve Fleet since August 2016
  - Korean Mail built 1969, scrapped 1995.
  - American Mail (1969) later renamed SS Cleveland, scrapped 2009
