= MS Cape Flattery (1940) =

History
- Name: Cape Flattery
- Namesake: Cape Flattery, Washington
- Owner: United States Maritime Commission
- Operator: American Mail Line (for WSA)
- Builder: Seattle-Tacoma Shipbuilding, Tacoma, Washington
- Yard number: 2
- Laid down: 15 April 1940
- Launched: 28 September 1940
- Completed: 29 May 1941
- In service: 1941
- Out of service: 1946
- Identification: U.S. Official Number: 240634
- Fate: Scrapped Valencia, Spain 1971

General characteristics (Note: Differences occur in builder's data and registers due to differing measurement methods even within a type of measurement. Registry figures are given preference below.)
- Type: M.C. Type C1-B
- Tonnage: 6,755 GRT, 3,965 NRT; 8,875 DWT
- Displacement: 12,875 to deep load line
- Length: 417 ft 9 in (127.3 m) LOA; 397 ft 4 in (121.1 m) registry
- Beam: 60 ft 1 in (18.3 m)
- Draft: 27 ft 6 in (8.4 m) deep load
- Depth: 23 ft 8 in (7.2 m)
- Decks: 3
- Propulsion: 2 × 2,000 hp (1,500 kW) diesel, 1 screw
- Speed: 14 knots (26 km/h; 16 mph)
- Capacity: 7,262 tons cargo; 440,606 cu ft (12,476.6 m^{3}) bale
- Crew: 39–40; 8 passengers
- Notes: 5 holds. 12,000 nmi (22,000 km; 14,000 mi) normal cruising range.

MS Cape Flattery was a United States Maritime Commission type C1-B cargo ship built in 1940–41 by the Seattle-Tacoma Shipbuilding, Tacoma, Washington, for the commission to be assigned to the American Mail Line for transpacific service. After the United States entry into the war the ship was operated by the War Shipping Administration (WSA) through American Mail as agents. The ship, after about a year of operation, became a troop transport for the remainder of the war.

Troop ship operations were largely to the Southwest Pacific. In 1945 the ship transited the Indian Ocean, Suez and the Atlantic to Hampton Roads and New York. Subsequently, Cape Flattery operated to Europe and the islands of the Caribbean. Completing allocation to Army requirements, the ship was laid up in the Hudson River on 28 April 1946, until it was sold for scrapping on 23 November 1970.

== Construction ==
Cape Flattery was laid down on 15 April 1940 by the Seattle-Tacoma Shipbuilding Corporation for the U.S. Maritime Commission (USMC) as USMC number 120, yard hull 2, as one of five C1-B motorships to be built at the yard. (Note: The basic C1-B was steam turbine powered. Ten were motorships, five from Seattle-Tacoma Shipbuilding and five from Western Pipe & Steel, San Francisco, California.) The ship was launched on 28 September 1940 with completion and delivery to the USMC on 29 May 1941. The ship was assigned U.S. Official Number 240634 and signal WFPP for operation under bareboat charter by the American Mail Line.

The five-hold ship had two full decks extending the length of the hull and a third extending to the machinery space. The five holds were served by sixteen electric-drive winches. Propulsion was two Hamilton diesels, each of 2,000 horsepower (1,500 kW) at 232.5 rpm with 10% overload capacity, driving a single screw at 90 rpm through Westinghouse reduction gears. Two four-cylinder, 450 hp (340 kW) Westinghouse diesels drove General Electric 275 kW (369 hp) generators for electric power.

== Operations ==
The ship was operated by the War Shipping Administration through American Mail as its agent under a General Agency Agreement through the war. Cape Flattery made cargo runs to the South West Pacific for over a year before returning to San Francisco in October 1942, where modifications were made to carry 552 troops with 317,842 cubic feet (9,000.3 m^{3}) of cargo capacity. Troop and cargo voyages to the South West Pacific continued until January 1945 when the ship underwent major repairs before departing via Los Angeles for a voyage through the South West Pacific on to Calcutta, Colombo, Aden and Port Said and across the Atlantic to Hampton Roads and New York. After a trip to Britain, the ship operated from Florida to Jamaica until a final trip from New York to Marseille and return on 25 December 1945.

On 29 April 1946, Cape Flattery was placed in the Maritime Commission Hudson River Reserve Fleet. The ship remained there until it was sold on 23 November 1970, as one of five ships sold to Aguilar y Peris, S.L., Valencia, Spain for $535,500 as scrap. The ship was delivered from the reserve fleet to the company on 9 April 1971.
