= MV Virginian =

Ship built in 1984

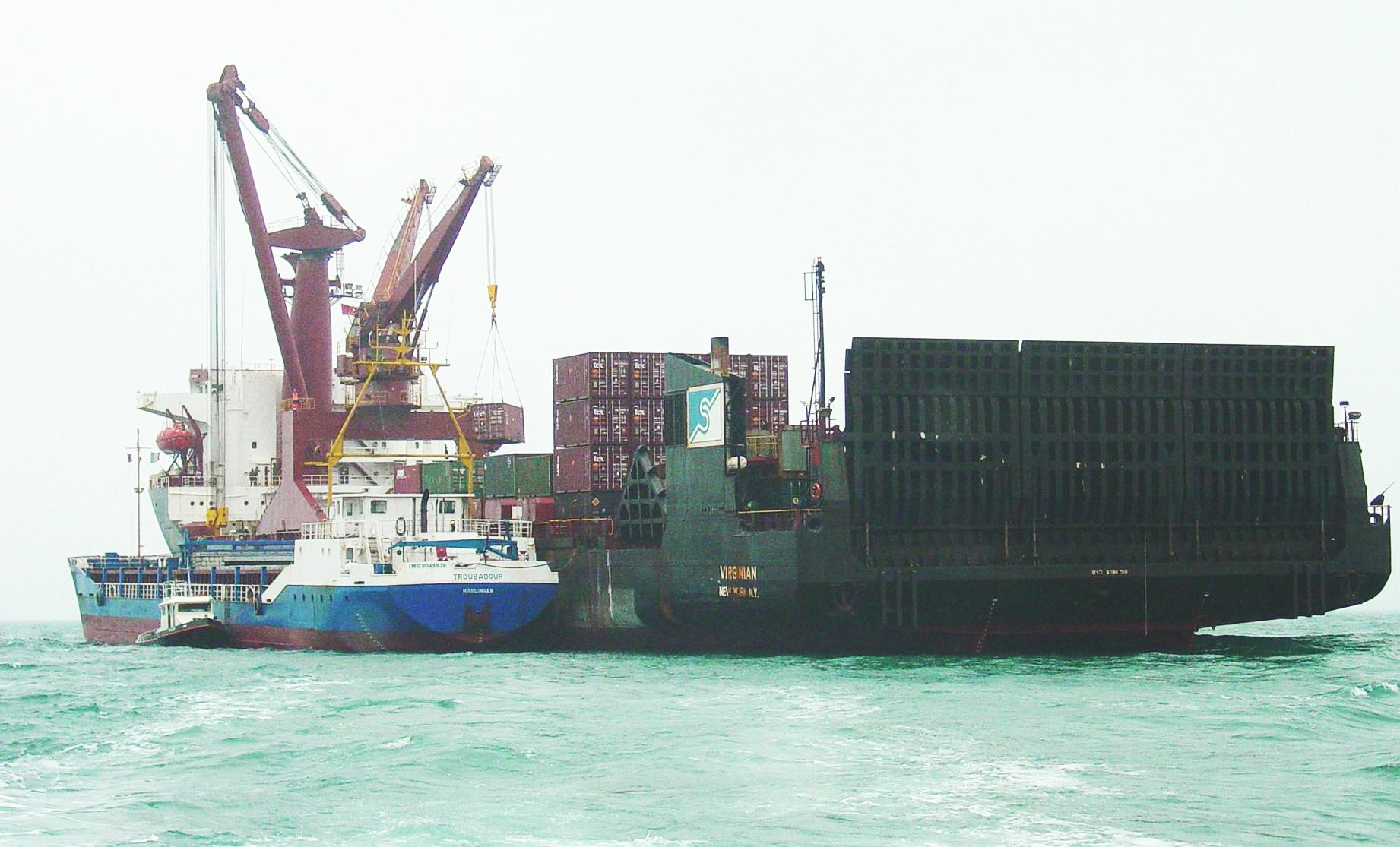
- MV Virginian conducts a side-by-side off-load operation with MV Troubadour off the coast of Talamone, Italy on March 27, 2006.

History

United States
- Owner: Sealift Incorporated
- Operator: Sealift Incorporated
- Launched: 16 December 1983
- Completed: 1984
- Identification: Call sign: KSPH; IMO number: 8300200
- Fate: Scrapped 22 August 2012

General characteristics
- Tonnage: 16,169 GT; 21,541 DWT
- Displacement: 34,601 tons; 9,849 tons light
- Length: 480.4 ft (146.4 m)
- Beam: 105.0 ft (32.0 m)
- Draft: 29.0 ft (8.8 m) maximum navigational draft
- Depth: 41.3 ft (12.6 m) molded depth
- Propulsion: two main engines driving two independent propellers
- Speed: 16 knots (30 km/h; 18 mph)
- Capacity: total 1413 twenty-foot equivalent units (TEU)
- Crew: 21 civilians

MV Virginian (T-AK 9205), formerly named the MV Strong Virginian (T-AKR-9205), was a combination container, heavy lift, and roll-on/roll-off ship. Owned and operated by Sealift Incorporated of Oyster Bay, New York, the ship was one of seventeen container—roll-on/roll-off ships in use by the Military Sealift Command, and one of 28 ships assigned to that organization's Sealift Program Office. The ship was previously known as the MV Saint Magnus and the MV Jolly Indaco.

== Cargo equipment ==
The ship had one large cargo hold with a tween deck that could be set at three different heights. It had a single 800-ton derrick for heavy-lift use. In addition, it had a single traveling gantry crane fitted with dual portal cranes, both of which were rated at 75 metric tons (74 long tons) independently, and could be operated together for lifts up to 150 metric tons (150 long tons). For roll-on/roll-off (roro) cargo, the ship had two trailer elevators and roro ramps.

== History ==
Built as Saint Magnus at Bremer Vulkan, Bremen, Germany in 1984, Virginian spent her first years in the commercial shipping service. Ironically, the ship that would later be known for carrying military supplies to the Middle East was accidentally hit by an Exocet missile while off-loading commercial cargo in Iraq in 1986. In these early years, the ship was also renamed Jolly Indaco.

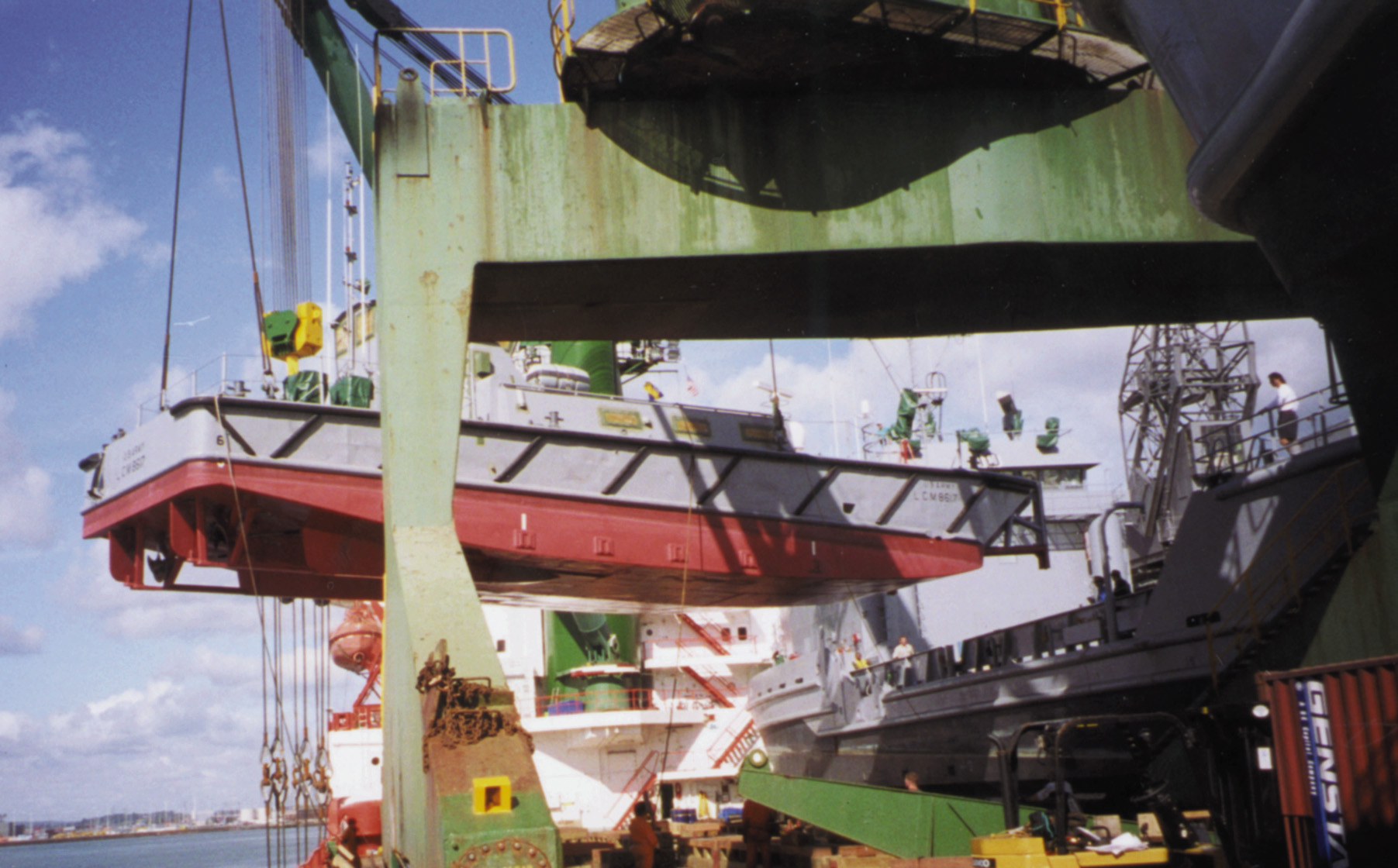
MV Strong Virginian lifts a Landing Craft Utility (LCU-2000) from the deck

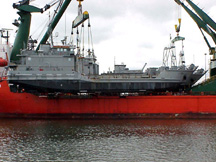
MV Strong Virginian lowers an LCU into the water

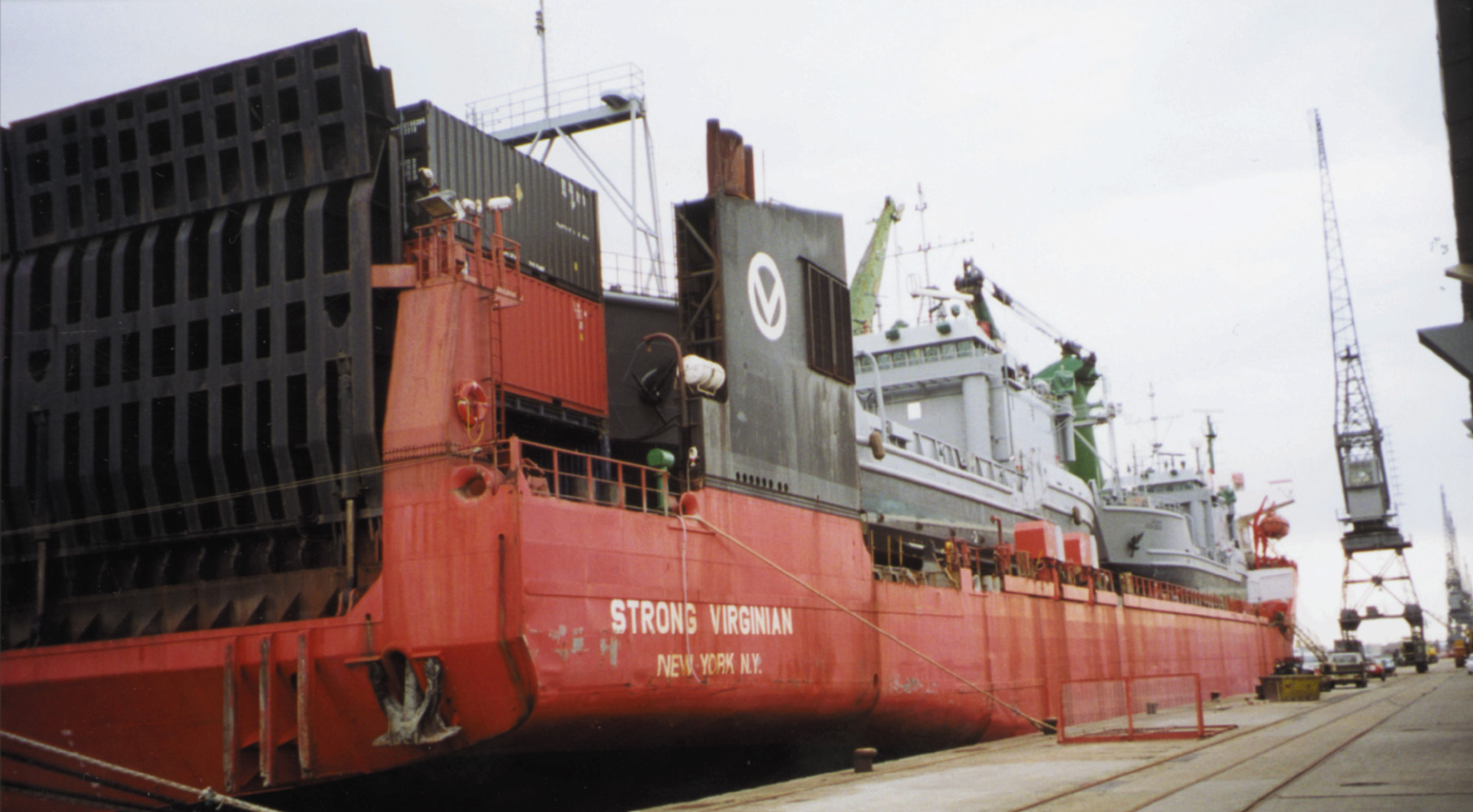
Side view

MSC first chartered the ship, then known as MV Strong Virginian, in 1992. For the next five years, a 500-bed fleet hospital was prepositioned aboard the ship as she carried out a variety of missions for the Department of Defense. Some of its jobs during this time included delivering equipment and supplies to Africa as part of Operation Restore Hope, transporting a bio-safety lab from Inchon, Korea, to Jakarta, Indonesia, and ferrying harbor tugs used by the U.S. Navy from Diego Garcia to Guam and back.

On March 14, 1997, the United States Department of Defense announced a new charter for the Strong Virginian. This contract, number N00033-97-C-3007, was a $23,592,099 time charter contract from the Military Sealift Command to operator Van Ommeren Shipping (USA), Inc., of Stamford, Connecticut. Under the contract, the Strong Virginian was to be used in the prepositioning of United States Army cargo in the Indian Ocean at the island of Diego Garcia. The contract included options which could have brought the cumulative value up to US$47,992,099 and was to expire by March 1999. This contract was competitively procured with 250 proposals solicited and four offers received.

Virginian was chartered again in 1998 and, for the next four years, the ship was used to support the U.S. Army. Virginian delivered combat craft, tugboats and barges and other elements of the Army's port opening packages. These packages are used to give the military access to rarely used ports in areas vital to U.S. military operations. On September 30, 2002, the ship was released from MSC service and returned to its owner.

Sealift Incorporated bought the ship from Van Ommeren Shipping USA, Inc. taking delivery on June 10, 2003. At that point, Sealift renamed the ship the Virginian. Between November 2002 and May 2006, the Virginian completed 21 missions for the U.S. military, delivering almost 1,700,000 square feet (160,000 m^{2}), or nearly 30 football fields, of cargo.

On October 16, 2007, the United States Department of Defense announced that it awarded contract N00033-08-C-5500 to Sealift Incorporated. This was a $10,614,000 firm-fixed-price contract plus reimbursables for the Virginian. The ship was contracted to carry containers laden with ammunition to support the global war on terrorism and the United States Central Command. The contract includes options, which, if exercised, would bring the cumulative value of this contract to $39,814,000. If options are exercised, work may continue through October 2011. This contract was competitively procured via Federal Business Opportunities and the Military Sealift Command websites, with more than 200 proposals solicited and three offers received. The U.S. Navy's Military Sealift Command is the contracting authority.

The ship was sold for scrap in August 2012 in Singapore and was recycled in Bangladesh that same month.
