= MV Buffalo Soldier =

French/American roll-on/roll-off ship

History

France
- Name: Monet
- Owner: French Government Line
- Builder: Chantier naval de La Ciotat (in French)
- Launched: 9 July 1977
- Completed: 1978

United States
- Name: MV Buffalo Soldier
- Namesake: Buffalo Soldiers
- Owner: RR and VO Partnership
- Out of service: 2001; returned to owners at completion of MSC charter
- Identification: IMO number: 7504627; Call sign: WWXB

General characteristics
- Class & type: Buffalo Soldier-class T-AK container & roll-on/roll-off ship
- Displacement: 26,378 long tons (26,801 t)
- Length: 670 ft (200 m)
- Beam: 87 ft (27 m)
- Draft: 34 ft 6 in (10.52 m)
- Speed: 16 knots (30 km/h; 18 mph)
- Complement: 19 civilian, 0 military

MV Buffalo Soldier (T-AK-9301) is a roll-on/roll-off ship, formerly of the French Government Line (now merged into CMA CGM). She was sold and reflagged U.S., renamed to honor Buffalo Soldiers, and chartered by the United States Navy Military Sealift Command as a Maritime Prepositioning ship serving at Diego Garcia laden with U.S. Air Force munitions. She is self-sustaining, that is, she can unload herself, an asset in harbors with little or no infrastructure. Her 120-long-ton-capacity roll-on/roll-off ramp accommodates tracked and wheeled vehicles of every description. While she is not currently in service with MSC, ships with her general characteristics are designated Buffalo Soldier class, fleet designation AK 2222.

== See also ==
- MV TSgt John A. Chapman (T-AK 323)
