= MV Maj. Bernard F. Fisher =

U.S. Military Sealift Command vessel

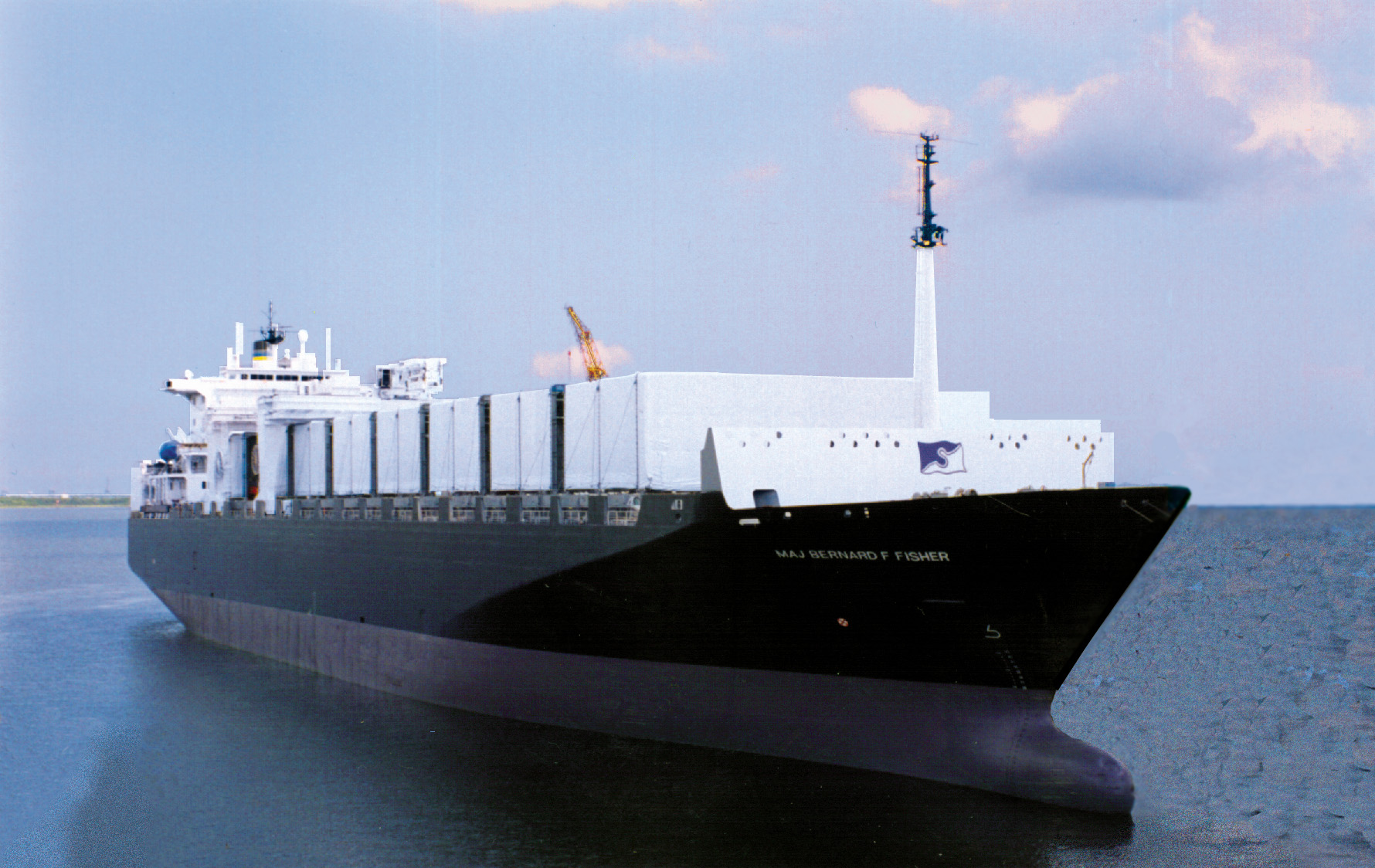

History

United States
- Owner: Sealift Incorporated
- Operator: Sealift Incorporated
- Launched: 21 December 1984
- Completed: 1985
- Renamed: Originally MV Sea Fox; Renamed MV Maj. Bernard F. Fisher in 1999
- Identification: IMO number: 8320559; MMSI number: 338481000; Callsign: KBGK
- Status: in active service

General characteristics
- Displacement: 48,000 tons
- Length: 652 ft (199 m)
- Beam: 105 ft (32 m)
- Draft: 34 ft (10 m)
- Speed: 19 knots (35 km/h; 22 mph)
- Complement: 24 civilian, 0 military

MV Maj. Bernard F. Fisher (T-AK-4396) is a U.S. Military Sealift Command vessel named for US Air Force Medal of Honor recipient Bernard F. Fisher. The vessel is a civilian-owned and operated container ship under contract to deliver pre-positioned supplies and equipment under the Military Sealift Command's Prepositioning Program. The Fisher is one of eight (as of 2008) container ships that support Navy, Defense Logistics Agency, Air Force, Marine Corps and US Army operations as part of Maritime Prepositioning Ship Squadron Three.

The ship is owned and operated by Sealift, Inc., of Oyster Bay, New York. Originally named MV Sea Fox, the Fisher was renamed in October 1999 as part of its chartering for the Prepositioning Program.
