= Louis J. Hauge Jr. =

Louis James Hauge
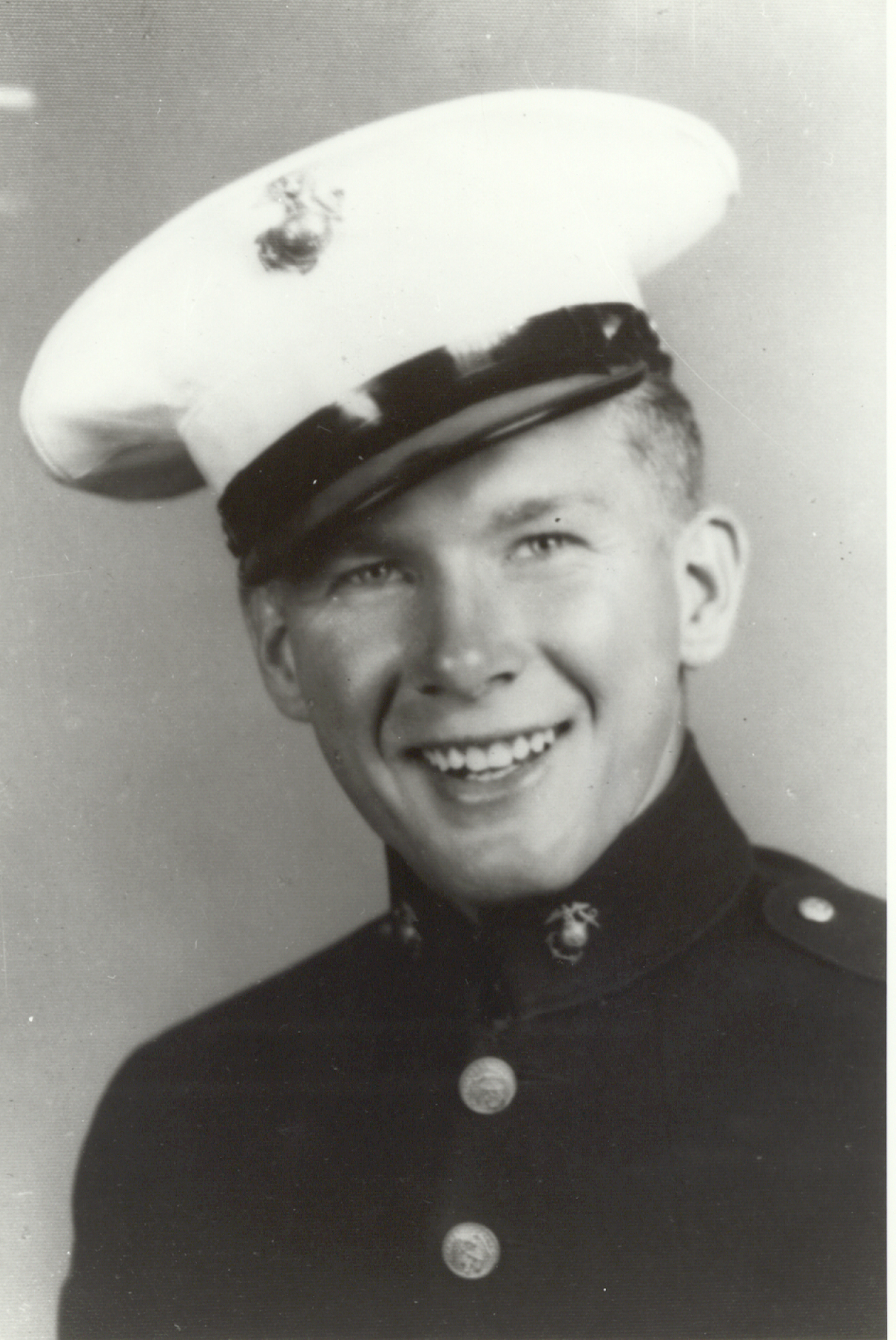
- Born: December 12, 1924; Ada, Minnesota
- Died: May 14, 1945 (aged 20); Okinawa, Ryukyu Islands, Japanese Empire
- Burial place: Listed on Tablets of the Missing, National Memorial Cemetery of the Pacific, Honolulu, Hawaii
- Military career
- Allegiance: United States of America
- Branch: United States Marine Corps
- Service years: 1943–1945
- Rank: Corporal
- Units: Company C, 1st Battalion, 1st Marines, 1st Marine Division
- Conflicts: World War II: Battle of Peleliu; Battle of Okinawa
- Awards: Medal of Honor; Purple Heart

Corporal Louis James Hauge Jr. (December 12, 1924 – May 14, 1945) was a United States Marine who posthumously received his nation's highest military honor — the Medal of Honor — for his actions during the Battle of Okinawa in World War II.

== Biography ==
Louis Hauge Jr. was born on December 12, 1924, in Ada, Minnesota. He was active in all athletics but left high school after his first year and worked in a canning factory in Ada, where he became assistant foreman. Hauge was later employed at a shipyard in Tacoma, Washington as a painter.

Hauge was inducted into the Marine Corps Reserve on April 23, 1943, and completed light machine gun school at Camp Elliott, California before serving with the 1st Marine Division at New Caledonia and New Guinea. Later, he saw combat action on Peleliu as a message runner with Headquarters Company, 1st Battalion, 1st Marines. In this capacity, Hauge distinguished himself for his bravery under fire and was given a meritorious promotion to corporal.

Corporal Hauge was killed in action on May 14, 1945, while serving on Okinawa as a member of the 1st Marine Division. For his heroic actions on that day, Hauge was awarded the Medal of Honor. At the time of his death, Cpl Hauge was squad leader of a machine gun squad in Southern Okinawa engaged in an assault against a heavily fortified Japanese hill. It was during the evening that the left flank of Company C, 1st Battalion, 1st Marines, was pinned down by a barrage of mortar and machine gun fire. The enemy was pouring enfilade fire into the ranks of the Marines. Quickly spotting the two guns responsible for the damage, Cpl Hauge boldly rushed across an open area, heaving hand grenades as he ran. Wounded before he reached the first gun, he nevertheless continued his one-man assault and completely destroyed the position. Without stopping, he pushed forward and attacked the second gun with grenades and demolished it before falling from the deadly fire of the Japanese snipers. Inspired by his actions, his company rose from their besieged position and pressed home the attack.

The award was presented to his father on June 14, 1946, by Col Norman E. True, USMC, who represented the Commandant of the Marine Corps.

Corporal Hauge's remains were either unidentified or not recovered; he is listed on Tablets of the Missing on the National Memorial Cemetery of the Pacific in Honolulu, Hawaii.

== Medal of Honor citation ==
The President of the United States takes pride in presenting the MEDAL OF HONOR posthumously to

CORPORAL LOUIS J. HAUGE JR.
UNITED STATES MARINE CORPS RESERVE

for service as set forth in the following CITATION:

For conspicuous gallantry and intrepidity at the risk of his life above and beyond the call of duty as Leader of a Machine-Gun Squad serving with Company C, First Battalion, First Marines, First Marine Division, in action against enemy Japanese forces on Okinawa Shima in the Ryūkyū Chain on 14 May 1945. Alert and aggressive during a determined assault against a strongly fortified Japanese Hill position, Corporal Hauge boldly took the initiative when his company's left flank was pinned down under a heavy machine-gun and mortar barrage with resultant severe casualties and, quickly locating the two machine guns which were delivering the uninterrupted stream of enfilade fire, ordered his squad to maintain a covering barrage as he rushed across an exposed area toward the furiously blazing enemy weapons. Although painfully wounded as he charged the first machine-gun, he launched a vigorous single-handed grenade attack, destroyed the entire hostile gun position and moved relentlessly forward toward the other emplacement despite his wounds and the increasingly heavy Japanese fire. Undaunted by the savage opposition, he again hurled his deadly grenades with unerring aim and succeeded in demolishing the second enemy gun before he fell under the slashing fury of Japanese sniper fire. By his ready grasp of the critical situation and his heroic one-man assault tactics, Corporal Hauge had eliminated two strategically placed enemy weapons, thereby releasing the besieged troops from an overwhelming volume of hostile fire and enabling his company to advance. His indomitable fighting spirit and decisive valor in the face of almost certain death reflect the highest credit upon Corporal Hauge and the United States Naval Service. He gallantly gave his life in the service of his country.

/S/HARRY S. TRUMAN

== Awards and decorations ==

1st row	Medal of Honor		
2nd row	Purple Heart	Combat Action Ribbon	Marine Corps Good Conduct Medal
3rd row	American Campaign Medal	Asiatic-Pacific Campaign Medal with one campaign star	World War II Victory Medal

== Honors ==
The United States Navy container & roll-on/roll-off ship, MV Cpl. Louis J. Hauge Jr. (AK-3000), commissioned on September 7, 1984, is named in honor of Cpl. Hauge. This ship is the lead ship of its class of five maritime prepositioning ships. The Cpl. Louis J. Hauge Jr. class is the original class of MPS ships chartered by Military Sealift Command.

A Marine Corps installation on the island of Okinawa was named Camp Louis J. Hauge Jr. During the Vietnam War, Camp Hauge served as a staging installation for Marines in transit to and from Vietnam. The camp was decommissioned following the return of Okinawa to the Japanese government.

== See also ==
- List of Medal of Honor recipients
