= MV TSgt John A. Chapman =

US Military Sealift Command Buffalo Soldier-class container ship

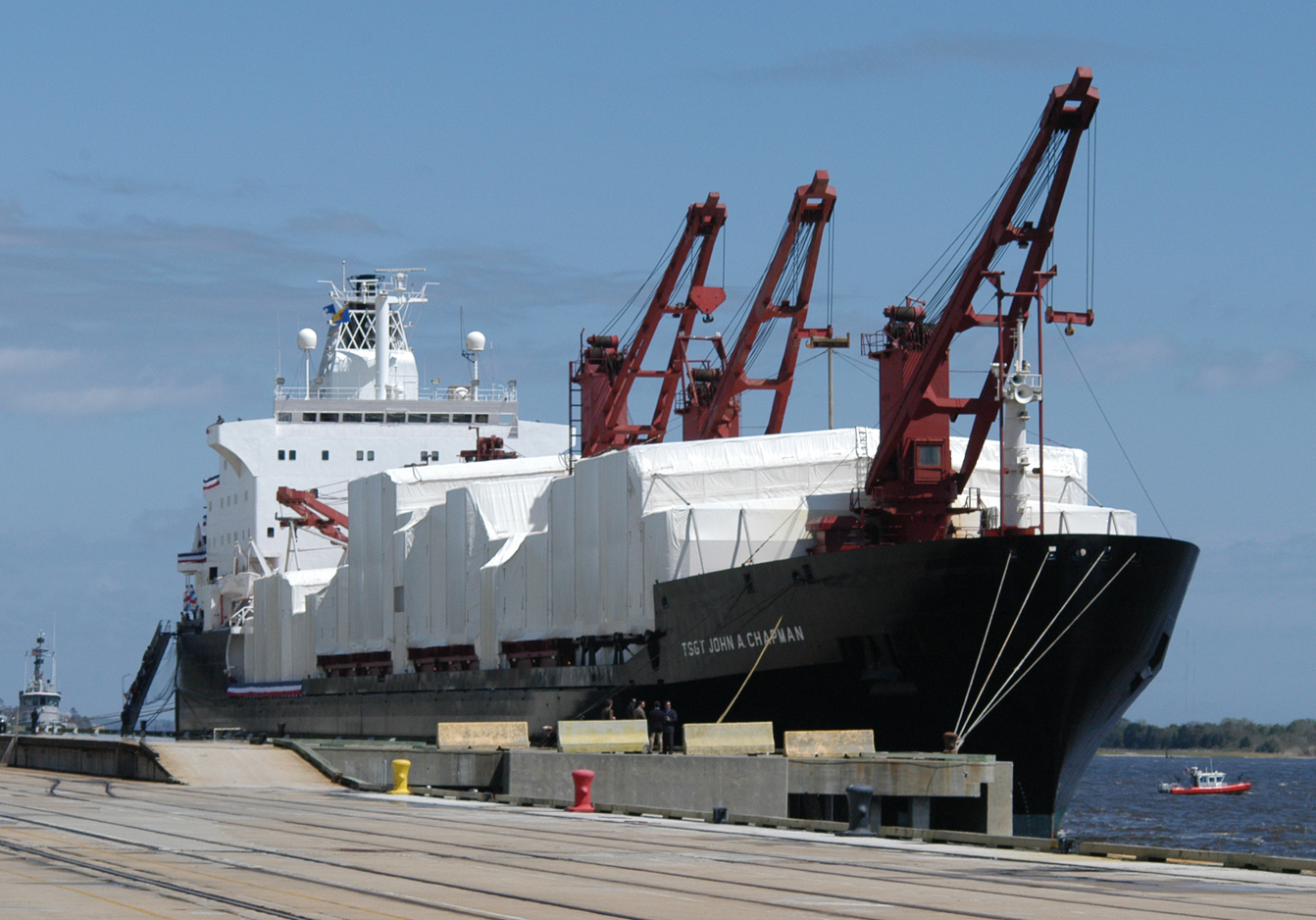
- MV TSgt. John A. Chapman (AK-323) moored pierside at Military Ocean Terminal at Sunny Point, N.C., 8 April 2006 during renaming ceremony.

History

France
- Name: MV CGM Utrillo
- Owner: Compagnie Générale Maritime
- Launched: 9 July 1977
- Fate: Purchased in 1992 by American Automar, re-flagged US and renamed MV American Merlin

United States
- Name: MV American Merlin
- Owner: American Automar
- Acquired: 1992
- In service: until late 2001 under long term lease as AK-323 MSC
- Out of service: Returned to her owners after completion of her MSC charter
- Reinstated: Acquired by Sealift Inc and renamed MV Merlin
- Notes: MV American Merlin was assigned to Maritime Prepositioning Program Squadron Two and operated out of Diego Garcia

United States
- Name: MV TSgt John A. Chapman (AK-323)
- Namesake: Technical Sergeant John A. Chapman, from the 24th Special Tactics Squadron, killed March 4, 2002, while fighting against the Taliban during Operation Anaconda in Afghanistan. He was posthumously decorated with the nation’s second-highest award for valor, the Air Force Cross. In 2018, Chapman's Air Force Cross was upgraded to the Medal of Honor.
- Owner: Sealift Inc
- Acquired: 8 April 2005
- Identification: IMO number: 7504639; Callsign: V4CK3
- Fate: Scrapped 4 September 2014

General characteristics
- Class & type: Buffalo Soldier class Container Roll-on/Roll-off Logistics Prepositioning Ship
- Displacement: 26,378 long tons (26,801 t)
- Length: 670 ft (200 m)
- Beam: 87 ft (27 m)
- Draft: 34 ft 6 in (10.52 m)
- Speed: 16 kn (30 km/h)
- Complement: 19 civilian, 0 military

MV TSgt John A. Chapman (T-AK-323) was a Buffalo Soldier-class container ship. She was one of Military Sealift Command's Prepositioning Program.

Built in 1978 by Chantier naval de La Ciotat in la Ciotat, France, she was originally named Merlin. On 8 April 2005, she was renamed for Pope Air Force Base combat controller Technical Sergeant John A. Chapman, a posthumous Air Force Cross recipient. He was awarded the Air Force Cross for his actions during the Battle of Takur Ghar. In 2018, Chapman's Air Force Cross was upgraded to the Medal of Honor.

TSgt John A. Chapman carried Air Force munitions. She featured climate-controlled cocoons on her weather decks which protect additional cargo from the marine environment. She was owned and operated by Sealift Incorporated under charter to MSC.

She was scrapped on 4 September 2014 at Alang.

== See also ==
- Operation Anaconda
