= American Mail Line =

Passengers and Shipping Company

Pacific Coast Steamship Company
- House flag (1926–1974)
- Founded: 1920
- Defunct: 1974
- Fate: close
- Headquarters: Seattle, Washington
- Area served: Cargo Worldwide - Passengers service in Pacific Ocean
- Services: Cargo and Passengers Liners
- Parent: Pacific Steamship Company

House flag of the Admiral Oriental Line

American Mail Line of Seattle, Washington was a commercial steamship service with routes to and from Seattle, Washington and the Far East. American Mail Line was founded in 1920, by Pacific Steamship Company also with a $500,000 investment from Dollar Shipping Company. The American Mail Line operated regular service until June 1938. American Mail Line was not profitable and ran with subsidies from Dollar, due to the cancellation of the ocean mail contracts. American Mail Line - And their affiliate Dollar Steamship Lines operated Trans-Pacific Routes, primarily from China and Japan to Canada and the United States. Some of the American Mail Line ships come for the Admiral Oriental Company when Dollar became the owner of Admiral Oriental Line. Admiral Oriental Line formed by H. F. Alexander was acquired in 1922 and renamed the American Mail Line

The American Mail Line ran Trans-Pacific Steamship Routes between the main ports of: Seattle, Victoria, Yokohama, Kobe, Shanghai, Hong Kong, Manila, and Honolulu. The Dollar Steamship Lines and the main owner of American Mail Line offered passengers joint service routes. In 1938 only service to and from California was offered. Regular service ended in 1938. After 1938 charter shipping was provided, American Mail Line was active with the Maritime Commission and War Shipping Administration during World War 2 and the Vietnam War. During wartime the American Mail Line operated Victory ships and Liberty ships, also a few Empire ships.

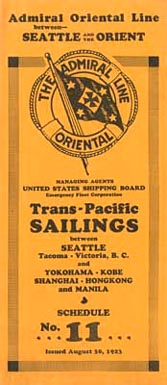
Admiral Oriental Line, 1923, Ships: President Jackson, President Jefferson, President Grant, President Madison, President McKinley

After World War 2 American Mail Line started Regular services again with a line of "Mail" Ships. The "Mail ship" China Mail, Island Mail, were a C2-SU design, built by Sun Yards of Chester, Pennsylvania. In 1965 the American Mail Line acquired a line of five Type C4-class ship ships, C4-S-1s.

== Services ==
Regular Passenger and mail service ships in 1923 and 1936, from the Admiral Oriental Line:

- President Grant
- President Jackson
- President Jefferson
- President Madison (American ocean liner in service 1922–1938)
- President McKinley

Regular service ports of call in 1923 and 1936: Seattle, Victoria, Yokohama, Kobe, Shanghai, Hong Kong, Manila.

Regular Passenger service ships in started in 1948: (service years)

- SS Java Mail (1948-1969)
- SS Island Mail (1948-1959)
- SS Ocean Mail
- India Mail (1948-1965)
- SS China Mail (1948-1959)
- SS Oregon Mail
- SS Schuyler O. Bland (1957-1959)

Regular Passenger service ports of call in 1957 for the above: Portland, Vancouver, Seattle, Yokohama, Kobe, Manila, Cebu, Iloilo, Hong Kong, Kobe, Nagoya, Yokohama, Pacific Northwest ports.

Regular Passenger service ships starting in 1957:

- Java Mail
- Island Mail
- American Mail
- Canada Mail

Regular service ports of call in 1957 for the above: Portland, Vancouver, Seattle, Yokohama, Kobe, Hong Kong, Manila, Cebu, Iloilo, Singapore, Penang, Port Swettenham, Medan, Singapore, Djakarta, Philippine ports, California ports and Pacific Northwest ports.

Regular Passenger service ships in started about 1965 with C4 Mariner-class ships: (service years)

- SS Ocean Mail (2) (1965-1974)
- SS Canada Mail (1965-1974)
- SS Japan Mail (1965-1974)
- SS Washington Mail (1965-1974)
- SS Philippine Mail (1965-1971)

== Cargo ships ==
American Mail Line's five C5-S-75a cargo ship built by Newport News Shipbuilding & Drydock Co., Newport News, Virginia as break bulk cargo or container ship, with 21,600 shp (16,100 kW) at 15,950 tons, 21.0 knots (38.9 km/h; 24.2 mph). The largest general cargo liners in 1969.

- Alaskan Mail 1968, renamed SS Cape Girardeau 1978. Assigned for non-retention in National Defense Reserve Fleet as of April 2020
- Indian Mail renamed SS Cape Gibson, assigned for non-retention in the National Defense Reserve Fleet as of April 2020
- Korean Mail built 1969, scrapped 1995. (staterooms for twelve passengers)
- Hong Kong Mail built 1968, renamed SS Wilson in 1978, scrapped June 2008.
- American Mail (1969) later renamed SS Cleveland, scrapped 2009

== World War II ==
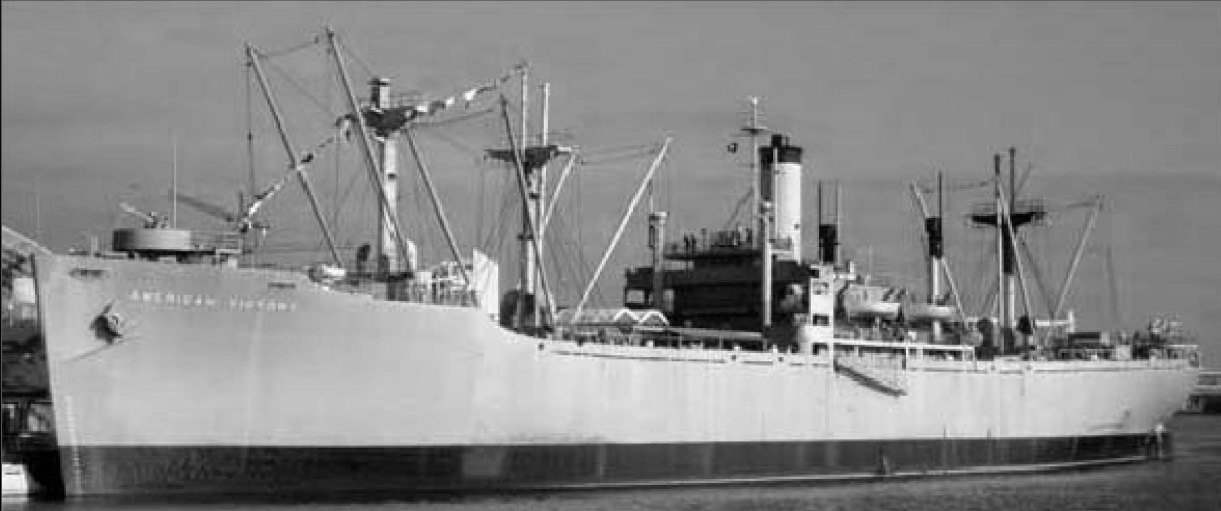
World War II Victory ship

The SS Alhambra Victory and others were run by its American Mail Line crew and the US Navy supplied United States Navy Armed Guards to man the deck guns and radio. The most common armament mounted on these merchant ships were the MK II 20mm Oerlikon autocannon and the 3"/50, 4"/50, and 5"/38 deck guns.

Operated during World War II:

- SS Alhambra Victory
- SS Appleton Victory
- SS Cabell
- MS Cape Flattery (1940)
- SS John S. Copley
- SS Cushing Eells
- SS George Clymer
- SS George R. Holmes
- SS Gilbert Stuart
- SS Joel Palmer
- SS Francis W. Pettygrove
- SS John A. Johnson
- SS John B. Kendrick
- SS John Lind
- SS Ida M. Tarbell
- SS Norway Victory
- SS Mankato Victory
- SS Meriwether Lewis
- Empire Peregrine
- SS Samakron
- SS Samfaithful
- SS Samuel Parker
- SS Sidney Edgerton
- SS Temple Victory
- SS Thomas A. Hendricks
- SS Tufts Victory
- SS R. P. Warner
- SS Ralph Barnes
- SS William H. Dall
- SS West Cressey
  - Sank or damaged:
- Capillo Dec. 8, 1941 bombed, later sunk by U.S. Army
- Coldbrook June 2, 1942 ran aground, total loss
- Collingsworth Jan. 9, 1943 torpedoed
- John S. Copley Dec. 16, 1943 torpedoed, damaged
- Crown City Sept. 2, 1942 ran aground
- Francis W. Pettygrove Aug. 13, 1943 torpedoed
- George Clymers June 7, 1942 torpedoed
- Meriweather Lewis March 2, 1943 torpedoed
- Samuel Parker July 22, 1943 several direct hits was repaired
- John A. Johnson Oct. 30, 1944 torpedoed

== Korean War ==
- SS Canada Mail
- SS Union Victory
- SS Allegheny Victory
- SS New World Victory

== Vietnam War ==
- Red Oak Victory
- SS Dartmouth Victory - SS Alaska Mail in 1960
- SS Great Falls Victory
- SS Las Vegas Victory
- SS Navajo Victory
- SS North Platte Victory
- SS Mayfield Victory
