= MV Capt. David I. Lyon =

U.S. Military Sealift Command vessel

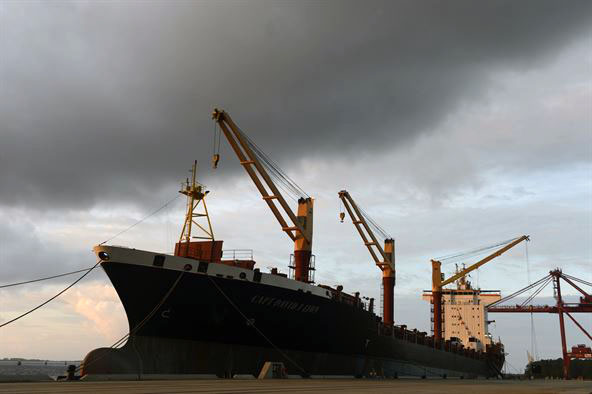

History

United States
- Owner: Sealift Incorporated
- Operator: Sealift Incorporated
- Launched: 1996
- Completed: 1996
- Renamed: Previous names (while operating in commercial service) include WIKING (1996), CAPRICORN CHALLENGER (1997), PACIFIC CHAMPION (1999), DAL EAST LONDON (2005), CALA POSITANO (2006), "POSITANO" (2010); Renamed to MV CAPT DAVID I.LYON in 2014.
- Identification: IMO number: 9123037; MMSI number: 367628660; Callsign: WDH6815
- Status: in active service

General characteristics
- Displacement: 52,878 tons
- Length: 686 ft (209 m)
- Beam: 106 ft (32 m)
- Speed: 16 knots (30 km/h; 18 mph)
- Complement: 19 civilian, 0 military

MV Capt. David I. Lyon (T-AK-5362) is an Air Force prepositioning vessel operated by the US Military Sealift Command named in honor of Capt. David I. Lyon, an Air Force logistics readiness officer and 2008 U.S. Air Force Academy graduate who was killed in action on December 27th, 2013, in Afghanistan. The vessel is a civilian-owned and operated container ship under contract to deliver pre-positioned supplies and equipment under the Military Sealift Command's Prepositioning Program. The Fisher is one of thirteen (as of 2024) container ships that support Navy, Defense Logistics Agency, Air Force, Marine Corps and US Army operations as part of Maritime Prepositioning Ship Squadron Three.

The ship is owned and operated by Sealift, Inc., of Oyster Bay, New York. The ship was built in 1996 by New Szczecin Shipyard in Szczecin, Poland, and was originally named Wiking, the Lyon was renamed in 2014 as part of its chartering for the Prepositioning Program.
