= MV Capt. Steven L. Bennett =

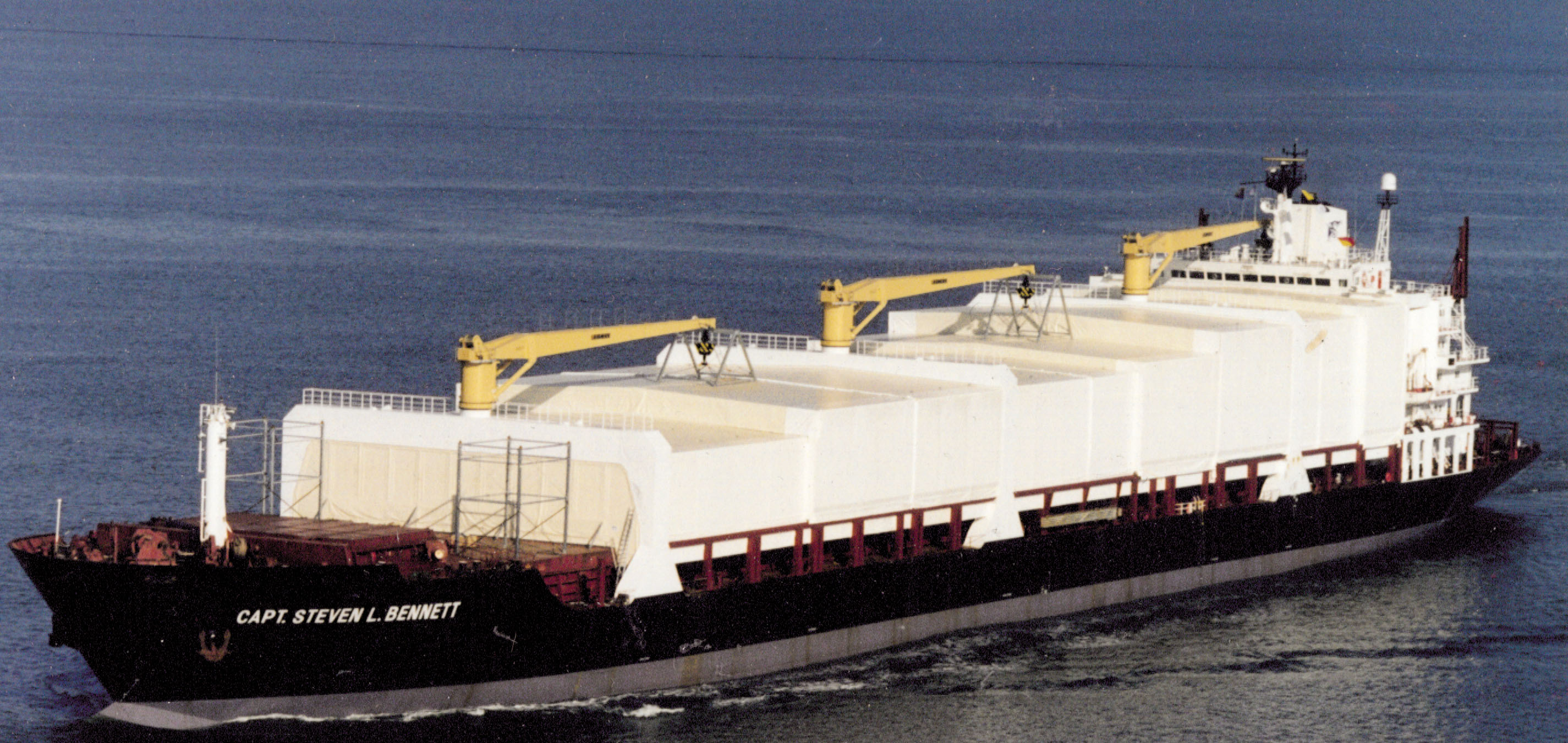
- MV Capt. Steven L. Bennett

History
- Name: MV Capt. Steven L. Bennett (1997–2016); Sea Pride (1996–1997); Martha II (1991–1996); TNT Express (1984–1991)
- Owner: Sealift Incorporated
- Port of registry: United States, Dover; Norway, Bergen (1996–1997)
- Builder: Samsung Heavy Industries; Koje, South Korea
- Laid down: 1 January 1984
- Launched: August 1984
- Completed: 1 October 1984
- Acquired: 1984
- Home port: Diego Garcia
- Identification: ABS class no: 8403975; Call sign: KAXO; IMO number: 8313661; MMSI number: 368145000
- Fate: Scrapped 18 March 2016

General characteristics
- Tonnage: 29,223 gt
- Displacement: 53,727.26 tons
- Length: 209.4 m (687 ft), overall
- Beam: 30.48 m (100 ft)
- Draft: 11.6 m (38 ft)
- Propulsion: 1 diesel; 1 shaft
- Speed: 16.5 knots

MV Capt. Steven L. Bennett (T-AK-4296) was a container ship and lead ship of her class. Originally named TNT Express, she was built by Samsung Heavy Industries in Koje, South Korea in 1984. She was named after United States Air Force Medal of Honor recipient Captain Steven L. Bennett. The ship was a Logistics Prepositioning Ship sponsored by the U.S. Air Force. The ship returned to commercial service after the MSC contract ended in October 2012.

== Previous owners ==
Capt. Steven L. Bennett was built in 1984 as TNT Express and operated as such under charter by ABC Containerline N.V. of Antwerp, Belgium for the London-based company TNT until 1991. In 1991, ABC Containerline bought the ship and renamed her Martha II. On February 14, 1996, the ship was detained in Melbourne, Australia when ABC went into receivership. Den norske Bank of Norway bought the ship later in 1996 and renamed her Sea Pride. In 1997, the ship was bought by Sealift Incorporated of the United States and on November 20, 1997, given her final name MV Capt. Steven L. Bennett. In the first quarter of 1998, Capt. Steven L. Bennett began her prepositioning service under MPS Squadron One in the Mediterranean and as such became MV Capt. Steven L. Bennett (T-AK-4296).

== History ==
Capt. Steven L. Bennett started her Air Force Prepositioning Program career in the Mediterranean Sea, with a mission to "support the prepositioning requirements of the Department of Defense by transporting U.S. Air Force ammunition." The contract, awarded to owner and operator Sealift Incorporated, of Oyster Bay, New York was for $41,823,500 with "reimbursables that could bring the cumulative value of this contract to $47.4 million."

In 1999, Bennett was involved in the NATO peacekeeping mission in Kosovo, when she off-loaded more than two-thirds of her cargo of U.S. Air Force ammunition containers in Nordenham, Germany, which were distributed to the United Kingdom, Italy and other locations within Germany—quickly replenishing the Air Force's stockpile in theater.

When the original contract expired in fiscal year 2002, Capt. Steven L. Bennett "competed for and won a new five-year contract and redeployed to the Mediterranean in October." Capt. Steven L. Bennett, as a ship carrying Air Force cargo, was used extensively during fiscal year 2002 to support Operation Enduring Freedom, Operation Iraqi Freedom, and the global war on terrorism.

Capt. Steven L. Bennett had an eventful 2003. Still assigned to MPS Squadron One, she started the year in the Mediterranean. In April, she delivered cargo to the Persian Gulf and continued on to Diego Garcia. In July, she returned briefly to the United States, stopping en route in Northern Europe to drop off and load additional cargo. In late 2003, Vice Adm. David Brewer III, commander of Military Sealift Command, awarded the officers and crewmembers of Bennett the Merchant Marine Expeditionary Medal.

Capt. Steven L. Bennett spent much of her time at anchor in the lagoon of Diego Garcia, and was spotted in New Orleans, Louisiana in early 2005.

== Ship specifics ==
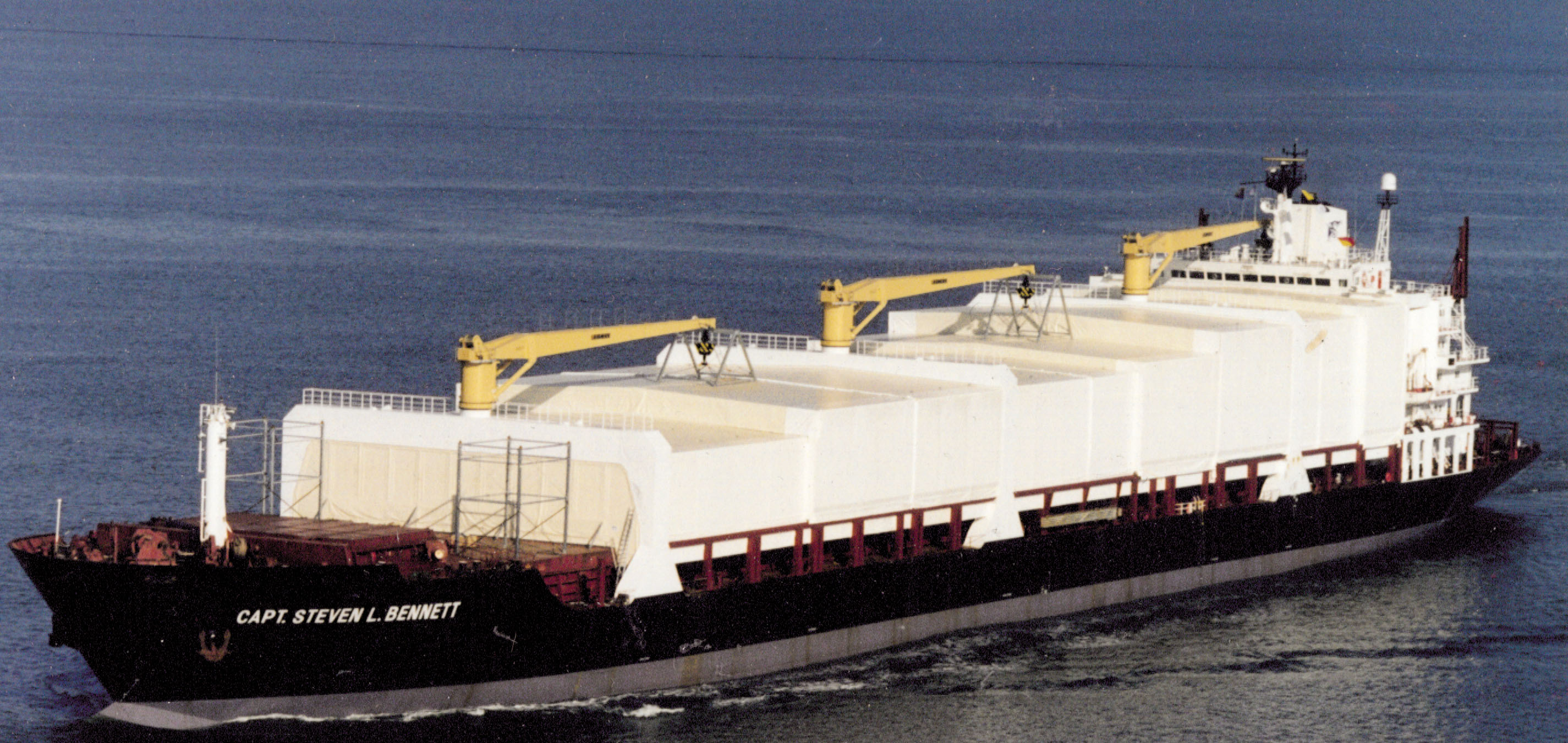
Capt. Steven L. Bennett included cranes and advanced environmental controls.

Capt. Steven L. Bennett's side number, T-AK-4296, gives some information about her. The letter T indicates that it was "assigned to Commander, Military Sealift Command as a type commander." The letters "AK" are reserved for cargo ships. In fact, Bennett was actually a conbulker, a flexible design allowing it to carry both containerized and bulk cargo. Fully loaded, it could carry 1,922 containers.

Capt. Steven L. Bennett, like all MSC container ships, was self-sustaining, meaning that she had cranes which allowed her to move cargo without depending on shore-based equipment. This allowed Capt. Steven L. Bennett to fulfill her mission even in primitive, undeveloped or battle-damaged harbors.

=== Environmental control ===
As Capt. Steven L. Bennett carried sensitive electronic cargoes in harsh environments for potentially years at a time, she required advanced environmental controls. The most obvious is the cocoon, or white fabric shell, that covered the ship from holds number nine to three. The cocoon was removed from the ship in 2012 during a shipyard period. The hold climate control equipment was also mothballed. All ships in Bennett class "feature climate-controlled cocoons on their weather decks that allow them to carry approximately 50 percent more cargo, while protecting the additional cargo from the marine environment."

In addition to the cocoon, Capt. Steven L. Bennett used Tidal Engineering Corporation's Control and Monitoring System (TECMS) which monitored and controlled the cargo refrigeration and dehumidification controls, as well as providing administrative reports.

== Fate ==
The ship was broken up at Alang, India on 18 March 2016.

== See also ==
- List of Military Sealift Command ships
- List of auxiliaries of the United States Navy
