= Sealift Incorporated =

American shipping company

- Type: Private
- Industry: Shipping
- Founded: 1975
- Headquarters: Oyster Bay, New York, U.S.
- Key people: John Raggio, Chairman and Chief Executive Officer; Ragnar Knutsen; Alan Alder; Fred Isaksen
- Website: sealiftinc.org

Sealift Incorporated is an American shipping company based in Oyster Bay, New York. The privately held corporation was founded in 1975 by the four owners who remain the principal executives. Sealift Inc. is one of the largest ocean contractors for transporting U.S. food aid and participates in the Voluntary Intermodal Sealift Agreement. Between the start of fiscal 2000 and the first quarter of 2008, Sealift Inc. was awarded US$402,151,046 in contracts.

Sealift's main fleet consists of eleven ships: container ships, general cargo ships, and a combination general/container ship. The fleet has ships from 12 to 39 years of age, including two steamships and three small ships under 10,000 tonnes deadweight (DWT).

Sealift Inc has collective bargaining agreements with the Seafarer's International Union and the American Maritime Officers union.

== History ==
Originally a shipbrokerage house specializing in paper, rice, and general cargo, Sealift Inc operated breakbulk liner services to the Mediterranean and from Brazil. The company currently operates a fleet of twelve U.S.-Flag, ocean-going and is one of the largest ocean transportation contractors for U.S. Government Food Aid cargoes.

Sealift Inc. is one of the largest ocean contractors for transporting U.S. food aid and participates in the Voluntary Intermodal Sealift Agreement. This program, also known as VISA, supplies the Pentagon with private cargo vessels which it can use to support "contingency deployments." The program saves the government the cost of maintaining a large fleet that would be idle in peacetime. In 2003, the company was awarded an emergency three-month, $4 million contract from USAID to provide freight service to Iraq.

Between the beginning of fiscal year 2000 and the first quarter of fiscal 2008, Sealift Inc. was awarded US$ 402.15 million in 207 separate transactions. $355.69 million was allocated from the Department of the Navy, $24.61 million from the U.S. Agency for International Development, and $21.85 million from the Department of the Army.

== Fleet ==
Sealift Inc. fleet
Name	Type	Built	GT	DWT
MV Advantage	Container/General	July 1, 1977	18,296	27,750
MV Ascension	General	January 1, 1993	3,972	4,152
MV Capt. Steven L. Bennett (T-AK-4296)	Container	October 1, 1984	29,226	41,812
MV TSgt John A. Chapman	Container	January 1, 1978	26,409	27,192
SS Cleveland	General	October 1, 1969	15,836	22,568
MV Maj Bernard F Fisher	Container	1985	34,318	34,100
MV Harriette	Bulk carrier	April 1, 1978	15,531	25,952
MV Noble Star	Container/General	July 1, 1977	16,840	24,792
MV Marilyn	Bulk carrier	April 1, 1978	15,531	25,952
MV Sagamore	Container/General	July 11, 1996	3,838	5,151
MV Strong Virginian	General	1984	16,169	21,541
SS Wilson (1968)	General	July 1, 1969	15,836	22,568
MV Capt. David I. Lyon (T-AK-5362)	Container/General	1996	16,803	22,878

Sealift's primary fleet consists of eleven ships, each of which is a container ship, a general cargo ship, or a combination general/container ship. ranging from 12 to 39 years of age. The two steamships SS Wilson (1968) and SS Cleveland (1968) are the oldest, having been built in 1969. The newest ship is the MV Sagamore which was built in 1996. The average age for all of Sealift's ships is slightly over 27 years.

The company's fleet has a capacity of over 250,000 tonnes deadweight (DWT). The MV Capt. Steven L. Bennett (T-AK-4296) and MV Maj Bernard F Fisher are the two largest at 41,812 t DWT and 34,100 t DWT respectively. The company operates two small ships under 10,000 DWT: the MV Ascension and the MV Sagamore.

The company previously owned and operated the oil tanker MT Montauk which carried jet fuel and other petroleum products between South Korea and Japan under a charter from Military Sealift Command. but sold the ship to the Cypriot company Kalia Maritime Co. Ltd. on February 1, 2007.

Separate from the main fleet, the company also owned the ex-US Navy MSC HSV-2 Swift. In 2015, Swift was sold to the United Arab Emirates' National Marine Dredging Company. On October 1, 2016, the ship was attacked and seriously damaged off Yemen. Houthi rebels claimed the ship sank. According to unnamed US Department of Defense officials, the damaged ship was being towed to Eritrea. The vessel sustained serious damage to its bow, but remained afloat.
