= USS Alpine =

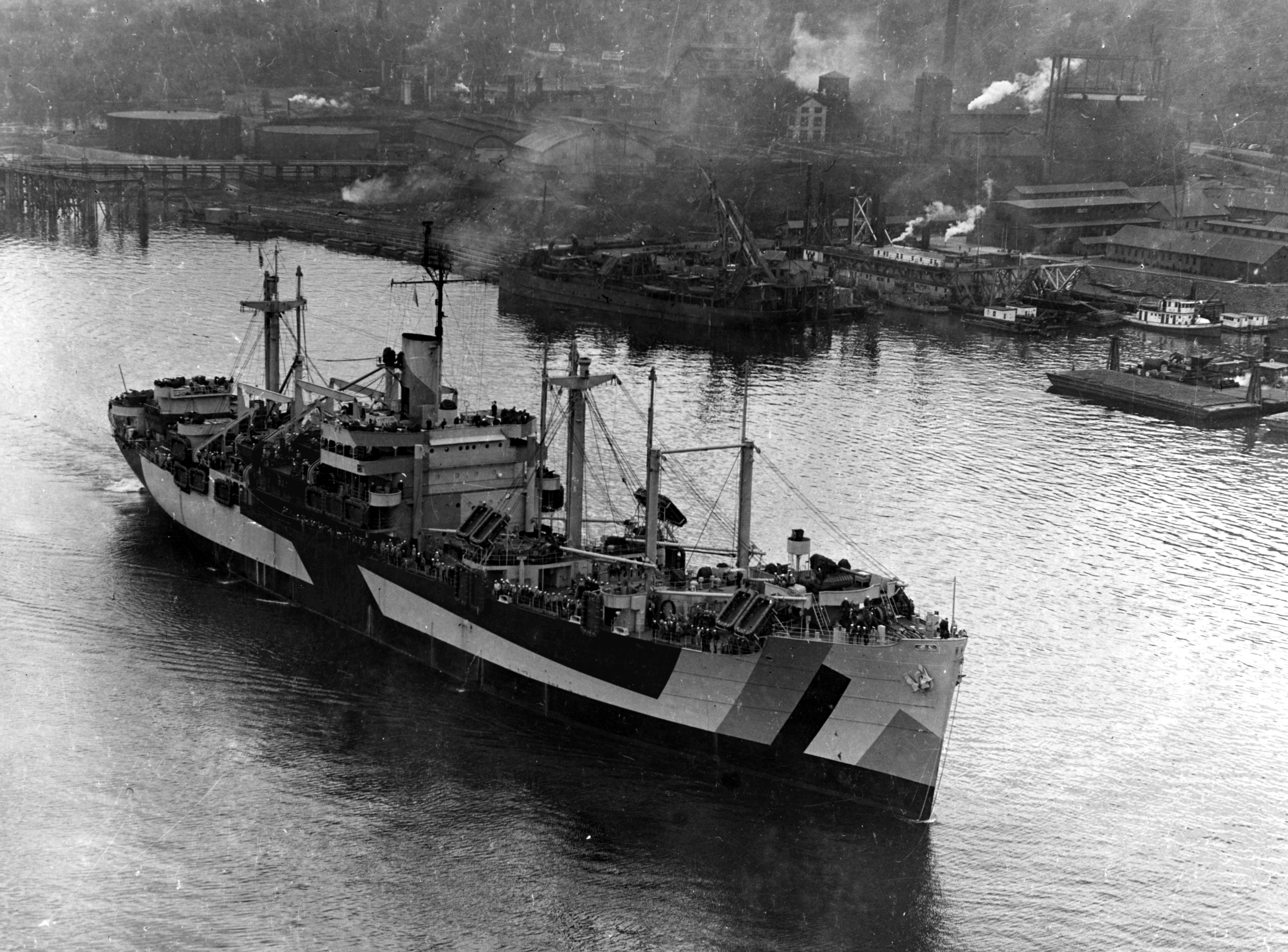

History

United States
- Namesake: Alpine County, California
- Builder: Western Pipe & Steel
- Laid down: 12 April 1943
- Launched: 10 July 1943
- Christened: Sea Arrow
- Commissioned: 22 April 1944
- Decommissioned: 5 April 1946
- Renamed: USS Alpine, India Mail, Transwestern, Buckeye Pacific, Empire Pacific.
- Stricken: 1 May 1946
- Honours and awards: Five battle stars for service in World War II.
- Fate: Scrapped October 1971
- Notes: WPS Hull No. 93.; MC Hull No. 281.; Type C3-S-A2.; Sponsor Mrs. Helen Marsh. Delivered 30 September 1943.

General characteristics
- Class & type: Bayfield-class attack transport
- Displacement: 8,100 tons, 16,100 tons fully loaded
- Length: 492 ft (150 m)
- Beam: 69 ft 6 in (21.18 m)
- Draught: 26 ft 6 in (8.08 m)
- Propulsion: Westinghouse geared turbine, 2 x Combustion Engineering D-type boilers, single propeller, designed shaft horsepower 8,500
- Speed: 18 knots
- Boats & landing craft carried: 12 x LCVP, 4 x LCM (Mk-6), 3 x LCP(L) (MK-IV)
- Capacity: 4,500 tons (180,500 cu. ft).
- Complement: 51 officers, 524 enlisted. Troop capacity 80 officers, 1,146 enlisted
- Armament: 2 × single 5 inch/38 cal. dual purpose gun mounts, one fore and one aft.; 4 × twin 40mm AA gun mounts forward, port and starboard.; 2 × single 40 mm AA gun mounts.; 18 × single 20mm AA gun mounts.

USS Alpine (APA-92) was a Bayfield-class attack transport in service with the United States Navy from 1943 to 1946. She was sold into commercial service in 1947 and was scrapped in 1971.

== History ==
USS Alpine was laid down as Sea Arrow under a Maritime Commission contract on 12 April 1943 at Los Angeles, California, by the Western Pipe and Steel Company; launched on 10 July 1943 sponsored by Mrs. Helen Marsh, acquired by the Navy on 30 September 1943, renamed Alpine on 30 August 1943 and simultaneously designated APA-92; and commissioned on 30 September at San Francisco, California. That same day, the command of Alpine was transferred to Commander Roger E. Perry. Crewed by civilians, she got underway on 2 October and steamed to Portland, Oregon, where she arrived on 4 October. Four days later, she was decommissioned at the Commercial Iron Works for conversion to an attack transport.

=== Pacific War ===
Upon completion of the yard work, Alpine was recommissioned on 22 April 1944. She took ammunition, provisions, and supplies on board and left Portland on 7 May. While en route south, the ship held training exercises, and reached San Diego on 13 May, and continued shakedown in the San Diego area through 18 June. The next day, Alpine left San Diego and arrived at Pearl Harbor on the 25th. Soon thereafter, she began onloading the personnel and equipment of the 77th Army Division. On the 28th, Alpine was attached to Transport Division 38. With 1,417 troops embarked, Alpine sailed on 30 June to support the seizure of Guam. Her first stop was Eniwetok, which she reached on 9 July. A week of debarkation exercises was followed by a few more days of replenishment of supplies. The ship at last set off for the Marianas on 17 July and began offloadmg her assault troops and equipment off the west coast of Guam on 21 July. For six days, the transport remained in the area providing support to her landing party on the beach. At 1544 on 27 July she began her journey back via Eniwetok to Pearl Harbor. She reached Hawaii on 7 August and commenced voyage repairs.

Alpine's next assignment was to carry troops to support the invasion and occupation of Leyte. On 27 August, with 1,416 soldiers on board, the transport left Pearl Harbor for one week of amphibious training exercises off the island of Maui. She returned briefly to Pearl Harbor but got underway again on 15 September. Alpine made a three-day stop at Eniwetok for supplies and then continued on to Manus in company with Task Group (TG) 33.1. She arrived there on 3 October and began unloading troops to several smaller landing craft. On 14 October, Alpine got underway with TG 79.1 to Leyte with 791 troops embarked. Early in the morning of 20 October, she arrived in Leyte Gulf and, at 0830, commenced the debarkation of her troops. Throughout the day, she unloaded supplies and received casualties. On the 21st, despite intermittent air attack warnings, she finished offloading her troops. The transport left Leyte at 2000 bound for Hollandia, New Guinea.

Alpine stood into Humboldt Bay on 26 October and transferred casualties to a hospital at Hollandia. She took on board provisions and fuel and then got underway on 5 November for Biak in the Schouten Islands. There, the transport loaded the headquarters squadron of the 5th Army Air Force and, on 14 November began the return voyage to Leyte Gulf.

At 0728 on 18 November Alpine commenced debarking troops. She soon spotted an enemy aircraft, and the transport's gunners opened fire from a range of 3,000 yards. The plane banked to the right and was observed splashing off the starboard quarter. Later, a second Japanese plane approached; and Alpine again opened fire. The plane was hit forward of the tail assembly, which exploded and left a trail of black smoke as the plane commenced a bank to the left and went into a full power dive toward Alpine's bridge. At an altitude of 1,200 feet, the aircraft burst into flames but still crashed into the attack transport's port side Two explosions produced a column of flame, and debris arose. Firefighting crews brought the flames under control in one-half-hour. Five crew members were killed and 12 injured. Alpine finished unloading her troops and cargo, left the area at 1810 and retired to Manus.

The transport anchored in Seeadler Harbor on 24 November and underwent hull repairs necessitated by her battle damage. On 1 December, she shifted to Finschhafen, New Guinea, and embarked 1,512 Army troops and their equipment. Alpine then participated in tactical and antiaircraft gunnery exercises in Huon Gulf. She returned to Manus to replenish her supplies, then sailed on 31 December for the island of Luzon in company with TG 79.3.

The transport reached Lingayen Gulf on 9 January 1945. After unloading her troops and cargo, she left the area on the 11th. The transport arrived at Leyte on 15 January, where she took on elements of the 38th Infantry Division. On 26 January, Alpine got underway back toward Luzon. Following two days of amphibious training exercises, the transport anchored off Luzon on 29 January and began lowering her boats at 0615. The next day, she finished this landing and retired to Leyte. Alpine spent the next month providing logistical support to smaller craft present in San Pedro Bay. She also underwent a period of tender availability.

Alpine's next assignment was to support the invasion of Okinawa and Nansei Shoto. She loaded Army troops and got underway on 12 March to conduct a week of landing exercises off the southern coast of Samar. On 27 March, she sailed with TG 51.13 for Okinawa. On 1 April, Alpine began lowering her boats. At 1908, a Japanese plane approached Alpine from the port quarter. At 1910, she took a bomb hit on the starboard side of her main deck. The plane itself then hit the ship, causing fires in the number 2 and 3 holds. By 2200, the transport was listing seven degrees to port. Another ship came alongside and assisted Alpine's firefighting efforts, and, by 2300, the fires were under control. The crew then began their search for casualties and discovered that 16 men had been killed, and 19 were injured.

On 2 April, USS Gear came alongside to assist the ship's force in making repairs.

Alpine left Okinawa on the 6th, bound for the United States via Saipan and Pearl Harbor. She reached the naval station at Seattle, Washington, on 30 April and entered drydock on 1 May for overhaul and repairs. Her patching was completed by 29 June, and Alpine got underway on 5 July for three weeks of refresher training off the west coast. From 21 to 25 July, Alpine loaded supplies and personnel at Oakland, California, for shipment to Okinawa. En route, she stopped at Pearl Harbor on 31 July and Eniwetok on 9 August. While steaming to Ulithi on 15 August, Alpine received the announcement that hostilities had ended. She reached Ulithi on 18 August and remained there through 3 September awaiting orders.

Alpine finally reported at Buckner Bay on 9 September. On 19 September, she was assigned to the 7th Amphibious Force, Pacific Fleet. On that day she sailed for the Philippines, where she took on troops scheduled to help occupy Korea. The transport got underway from San Pedro Bav on 10 October with units of the 6th Infantry Division embarked. She anchored at Jinsen, Korea, on 16 October and debarked her passengers.

=== Operation Magic Carpet ===
Alpine again got underway on 24 October and headed for various ports in China to load American forces for passage home. After brief stops at Taku, Weihaiwei, and Qingdao, China, Alpine set out for the long journey back to the West Coast. The transport reached San Diego on 19 November, then underwent a fortnight of voyage repairs. On 5 December, she returned to the western Pacific. Alpine steamed to Nagoya, Japan, arriving on 26 December. There, she embarked 1,915 Army troops, reversed her course, and steamed back to the United States. She arrived at Tacoma, Washington, on 14 January 1946 and, 12 days later, began a voyage, via the Panama Canal, to Norfolk, Virginia. She transited the canal on 13 February and arrived at Norfolk on 20 February. Alpine was decommissioned at Norfolk on 5 April 1946, transferred back to the Maritime Commission for disposal on 10 April, and her name struck from the Navy List on 1 May.

Alpine was awarded five battle stars for World War II service. She was also awarded a Navy Unit Commendation for her actions at Okinawa in April 1945.

=== Decommissioning and fate ===
In 1947 the Maritime Commission sold Alpine to American Mail Lines, who registered the vessel in Portland, Oregon and renamed her India Mail. She continued in service with American Mail until 1965, when she was sold to Hudson Waterways Corporation, who re-registered her in New York and renamed her Transwestern. In 1969 the ship was sold again, this time to the Buckeye Steamship Company of Delaware who dubbed her Buckeye Pacific. In 1971 the ship changed hands yet again, this time becoming the property of the Empire Steamship Company of Panama. In 1971 the vessel changed hands for the last time, sold to Taiwanese interests for scrapping. Her final passage was to the scrapyard at Kaohsiung, where she arrived on 7 December of the same year.
