= MV Ascension =

Cargo and container ship

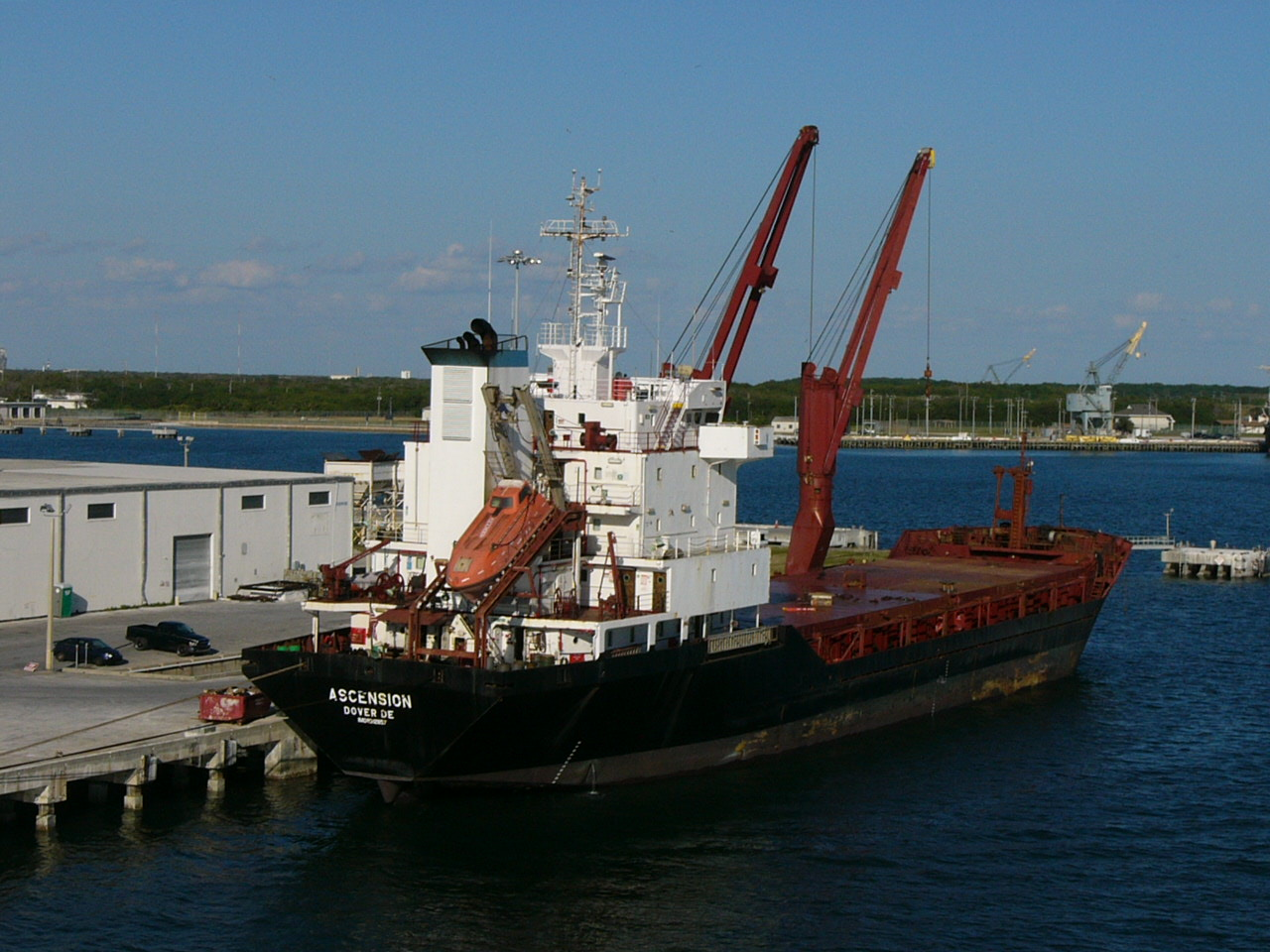
- MV Ascension docked in Port Canaveral, Florida in 2008

History

United States
- Owner: Sealift Incorporated
- Operator: Sealift Incorporated
- Port of registry: Dover, Delaware
- Route: Cape Canaveral, Florida to Ascension Island
- Builder: Sedef Gemi Insaati AS
- Yard number: 90
- Launched: 21 August 1992
- Identification: IMO number: 8912857; MMSI number: 366944000; Call sign: WBAS

Russia
- Name: MV Chekov
- Builder: Sedef Gemi Insaati AS
- Yard number: 90
- Acquired: January 1, 1993

General characteristics
- Tonnage: 3,972 GT; 4,152 DWT
- Length: 90.0 m (295.3 ft) LBP
- Beam: 17.3 m (57 ft)
- Depth: 7.0 m (23.0 ft) molded depth
- Decks: single deck
- Ice class: IA
- Installed power: 2 auxiliary generators rated at 264 kW
- Propulsion: 6L35MC MAN B&W Diesel A/S
- Complement: 16
- Notes: Two cargo cranes rated at 25 tonne SWL; two general cargo holds.

MV Ascension is an American-flagged general cargo and container ship with a capacity of 4,152 tonnes deadweight (DWT). Built in 1993, the ship was originally a Russian timber carrier. She was bought by Sealift Incorporated in 1998 and was providing a cargo liner service between Cape Canaveral, Florida and Ascension Island until 2012.

== History ==
The ship was built in Turkey as the MV Chekov and originally used by Russian operators to carry timber.

Sealift Incorporated bought the ship specifically for the Ascension Island liner service. The first American crew embarked November 25, 1998 and the ship started its maiden voyage under the U.S. flag on December 2, 1998. Departing from Port Canaveral, Florida, the voyage took 15 days at an average speed of 12.5 knots (23.2 km/h; 14.4 mph) and covered 4,426 nautical miles. The voyage ended when the ship dropped anchor in Clarence Bay, Ascension on December 17, 1998. The original contract was for a period of three years.

On December 7, 1999, the Ascension rendered assistance to the French sailboat Seneca. The sailboat was en route to Guadeloupe from France and had been becalmed for three days. In addition to providing 300 liters of fuel, the Ascension topped off the sailboat's water tank and provided cigarettes and soft drinks.

== Ship's complement ==
The ship's complement is the captain and members of the deck, engine, and steward's departments. As of 1998, the deck department consisted of the chief mate, the second mate, four able seamen, and two ordinary seamen. The engine department consisted of the chief engineer, a first assistant engineer, a second assistant engineer, and 3 oilers. The steward's department consisted solely of one chief steward.

== Route and cargo ==
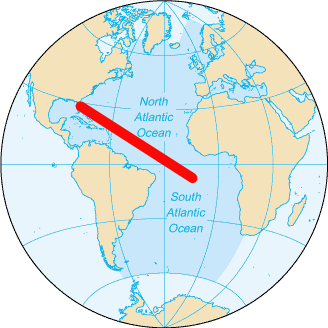
Approximate route from Cape Canaveral to Ascension Island.

The ship travels a dedicated liner route between Cape Canaveral, Florida and Ascension Island so as to arrive at the island at 60-day intervals. Ascension Island lies in the South Atlantic Ocean, east from Brazil and around 1,000 miles (1,600 km) from the coast of Africa. It is part of the British overseas territory of Saint Helena, Ascension and Tristan da Cunha, the main island of which is 800 miles (1,300 km) to the south east. The Island is named after the day of its recorded discovery, Ascension Day.

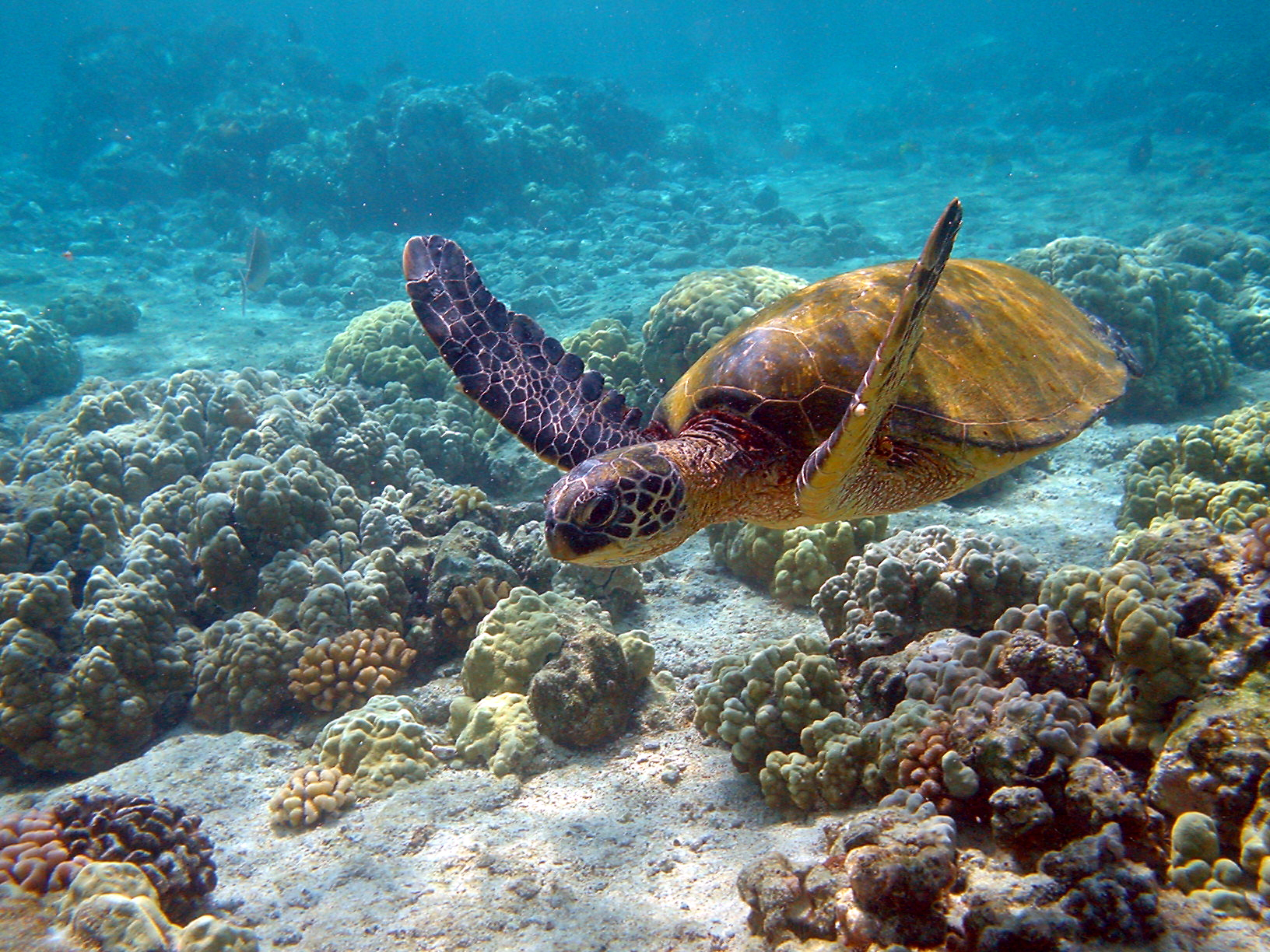
The crew of the Ascension has assisted in green sea turtle research.

The cargo consists mainly of intermodal containers, refrigerated shipping containers, as well as break bulk cargo. The ship also carries cargo for non-US, civilian customers. The unloading process can consist of over 100 separate lifts and take several days

In addition to carrying cargo, the crew of the Ascension has assisted in green sea turtle research, delivering tagged animals about 200 miles (320 km) off the coast. Ascension is the most notable nesting ground for Chelonia mydas in the Southern Atlantic Ocean. On Ascension, annual nesting occurs in the volume of around 6,000 to 13,000 individual turtle nests.

== See also ==
- Sealift Incorporated
- List of Military Sealift Command ships
- Container ship
- Bulk carrier
