= Mohongo-class gunboat =

19th-century US Navy gunboats

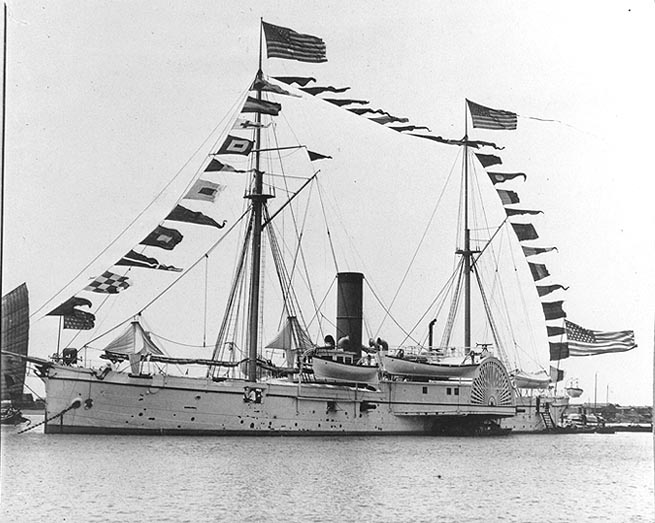
- USS Monocacy during a visit to China in 1902

Class overview
- Name: Mohongo-class gunboat
- Builders: Donald McKay; Zeno Secor & Company; Denmead Foundry; Continental Iron Works; Reaney, Son & Archbold; Harrison Loring Shipyard
- Operators: Union Navy; United States Navy
- Preceded by: Sassacus class
- Succeeded by: None
- Built: 1863–1866
- In service: 1865–1903
- Completed: 7

General characteristics
- Type: Side-wheel gunboat
- Length: wl: 255 feet (78 m)
- Beam: 35 feet (11 m)
- Draft: 9 feet (2.7 m)
- Propulsion: 2 × boilers; 1 × engine; 2 × side wheels
- Sail plan: Schooner
- Speed: 11–12 knots (20–22 km/h; 13–14 mph)
- Complement: 159-190
- Armament: Varied

The Mohongo-class gunboats were a series of seven side-wheel double-ended gunboats operated by the United States Navy during the late 19th century. The ships were built for the Union Navy during the American Civil War and was the third generation of double-ended gunboats intended to engage Confederates in rivers and shallow water. Only one ship was completed in time to join the war effort. By 1870, four ships were sold for civilian use and an additional gunboat was wrecked. The two remaining ships, Monocacy and Ashuelot, were assigned to the Asiatic Squadron. Ashuelot was wrecked in 1883 and Monocacy was retired and replaced in 1903.

== Development and design ==
During the American Civil War, the Union Navy ordered the mass construction of double-ended gunboats. The gunboats, with a shallow draft and identical fore and aft, were intended for littoral and riverine operations against the Confederate States. Compared to other gunboats, the double-ended vessels could shoot in either direction without the need to turn around. The ships were primarily propelled by two side-wheels mounted amidship, although they were also equipped with two masts. The first class of double-ended gunboats was the heterogeneous Octorara class, which was followed by the homogeneous Sassacus class. Third was the Mohongo class, which was enlarged from the Sassacus design and featured iron hulls.

The Mohongo-class design featured a length along the waterline of 255 feet (78 m), beam of 35 feet (11 m), mean draft of 9 feet (2.7 m), and a complement between 159 and 190. They were the largest double-ended gunboats and displaced 1,370 tons. The ships were propelled by direct-acting inclined engines powered by two boilers fed by 224 tons of coal that turned two side-wheels to produce 850 indicated horsepower (630 kW) and speeds between 11 and 12 knots (20 and 22 km/h; 13 and 14 mph). The ships also featured one funnel and were rigged as schooners. While the full hull forms performed better at ocean navigation then previous double-ended gunboats, they were criticized for being unstable and hard to handle.

Armament greatly varied between ships and time period. Initially, the ships were fitted with a broadside of several Dahlgren guns and a 9 in (23 cm) Parrot rifle on the fore and aft, with several howitzers mounted on the upper deck. Compared to other warships of the era, conditions on board were very comfortable. The steam engines kept the vessels warm even during frigid weather, and condensed water from the heating system was used by the crew. Crewmembers also appreciated large cabins and an open berth deck.

== Service history ==
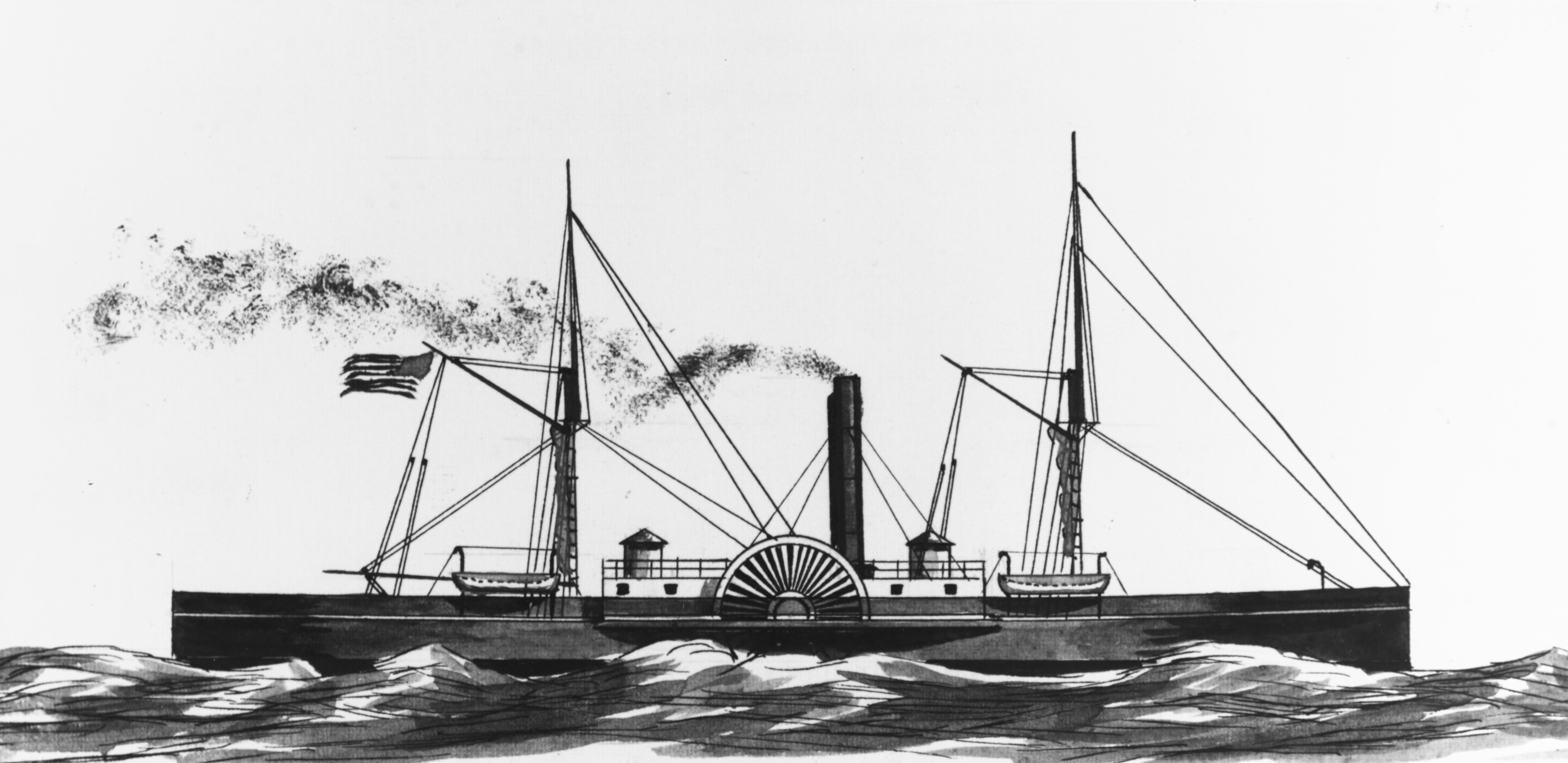
Water color illustration of USS Muscoota, depicting the ship's side wheels and arrangement

Contracts for seven ships were issued between June and July 1863 to civilian shipyards that had experience with metalworking, and each ship was laid down that year. Only one ship was completed soon enough to serve during the Civil War, and the Navy no longer had a need for double-ended gunboats once the war was over.

Suwanee was wrecked off British Columbia in 1868 while four ships—Mohongo, Muscoota, Shamokin, and Winnipec—were sold off by 1870 for merchant use. Monocacy (1864) and Ashuelot were retained by the Navy assigned to the Asiatic Squadron, where the ships performed well in shallow waters in the region and adapted to the climate. While Ashuelot was wrecked off Shantou, China in 1883, Monocacy served as part of the squadron until she was replaced in 1903 by USS Monocacy (PG-20).

== Ships in class ==
Data
Name	Builder	Laid down	Launched	Commissioned	Out of service
Ashuelot	Donald McKay	1863	22 July 1865	4 April 1866	Wrecked, 1883
Mohongo	Zeno Secor & Company	1863	9 July 1864	23 May 1865	Decommissioned, 29 May 1870
Monocacy	Denmead Foundry	1863	14 December 1864	1866	Decommissioned, 1903
Muscoota	Continental Iron Works	1863	1864	5 January 1865	Sold, 17 June 1869
Shamokin	Reaney, Son & Archbold	1863	1864	31 July 1865	Decommissioned, 24 December 1868
Suwanee	Reaney, Son & Archbold	1863	13 March 1864	23 January 1865	Wrecked, 9 July 1868
Winnipec	Harrison Loring Shipyard	1863	20 August 1864	1865	Sold, 17 June 1869
