= Camanche =

Camanche can refer to:

- Camanche Dam in California
- Camanche Reservoir in California
- Camanche, California, a former settlement
- Camanche, Iowa, a city in Clinton County
- Camanche Township, Clinton County, Iowa
- USS Camanche (1864), a warship of the 19th-century United States Navy
- Camanche (ACM-11), a warship of the 20th-century United States Navy

== See also ==
- Comanche
