= List of shipwrecks in February 1883 =

The list of shipwrecks in February 1883 includes ships sunk, foundered, grounded, or otherwise lost during February 1883.

== 1 February ==
List of shipwrecks: 1 February 1883
Ship	State	Description
Albert	United Kingdom	The ship collided with the steamship William Coulman in the Humber and was severely damaged. She was towed in to Hull, Yorkshire in a severely leaky condition.
Barcelona	Germany	The steamship struck a sunken wreck in the Red Sea and was holed. She put in to Port Said, Egypt waterlogged at the bow. She was on a voyage from Sydney, New South Wales to London, United Kingdom.
Golden Horn	United Kingdom	The ship ran aground at Gareloch, Argyllshire. She was on a voyage from the Clyde to Liverpool, Lancashire.
Hyaena	United Kingdom	The steamship was driven ashore at Fethard-on-Sea, County Wicklow. She was later refloated and taken in to Fethard-on-Sea for repairs.
Plassey	United Kingdom	The ship was driven ashore and wrecked at Sandgate, Kent with the loss of two of her six crew.
Spanker	United Kingdom	The smack was driven ashore at Great Yarmouth, Norfolk. Her crew were rescued by rocket apparatus.

== 2 February ==
List of shipwrecks: 2 February 1883
Ship	State	Description
Charles	United Kingdom	The Mersey Flat foundered off the Hilbre Islands, Cheshire. Her crew were rescued by a steamship.
Copia	United Kingdom	The steamship departed from Portland, Dorset for Messina, Sicily, Italy. Presumed subsequently foundered with the loss of all hands. Wreckage from the ship washed up at Salcombe, Devon.
Kenmure Castle	United Kingdom	The steamship foundered in the Bay of Biscay. There were sixteen survivors from the 50 people on board. She was on a voyage from London to Shanghai, China.
Louisa	United Kingdom	The smack sank in the English Channel off Shoreham-by-Sea, Sussex. Her crew were rescued.
Lovebud	United Kingdom	The brigantine was wrecked off Ramsey, Isle of Man with the loss of all hands.
Mary	United Kingdom	The schooner foundered in the Irish Sea off the north Wales coast with the loss of her captain. Two survivors were rescued by a steamship.
Matilda Hilyard	United Kingdom	The steamship was wrecked of Cádiz, Spain.
Nellie, and Prince	United Kingdom	The steamship Prince collided with the smack Nellie at Dover, Kent. Both vessels were severely damaged.
Rumbold	United Kingdom	The schooner was driven ashore on Terschelling, Friesland, Netherlands. Her crew were rescued. She was on a voyage from South Shields, County Durham to Great Yarmouth, Norfolk.
Storm Nymph	United Kingdom	The schooner was driven ashore near the entrance of Newquay harbour, Cornwall. One member of crew jumped overboard and was not seen again, the rest were saved by the rocket apparatus. Storm Nymph was on a voyage from Cardiff, Glamorgan to Hayle, Cornwall.
Strathspey	United Kingdom	The ship ran aground on the wreck of James (United Kingdom) off Stranraer, Wigtownshire. She was refloated the next day.
Tacoma	United States	The steam collier was wrecked at Umpquah City, Oregon with the loss of nine of her crew.
Taunton Packet	United Kingdom	The ship foundered off the Bishop's Rock with the loss of one of her four crew. She was on a voyage from Newport, Monmouthshire to New Ross, County Wexford.
Unnamed	United Kingdom	The steamship sank off Cape Cornwall with the loss of all hands. Witnessed by the barquentine Nellie S. (United Kingdom).
Unnamed	France	The chasse-marée collided with the steamship Hilda (United Kingdom) and sank in the Solent 1 nautical mile (1.9 km) off Yarmouth, Isle of Wight, United Kingdom with the loss of all hands. A boat from Hilda which was sent to rescue her crew was reported lost with five crew aboard, but put in to Alum Bay.

== 3 February ==
List of shipwrecks: 3 February 1883
Ship	State	Description
Avon	United Kingdom	The trow foundered in the Bristol Channel off the coast of Somerset with the loss of a crew member. She was on a voyage from Newport, Monmouthshire to Bristol, Gloucestershire.
Canon Harrison	Canada	The ship was abandoned in the Atlantic Ocean (44°00′N 23°40′W). Her crew were rescued by the barque Gimello (United Kingdom). Canon Harrison was on a voyage from Calcutta, India to Liverpool, Lancashire, United Kingdom.
Harkaway	United Kingdom	The schooner was wrecked at Lannion, Finistère, France. Her crew were rescued.
Julia Matilda	Norway	The brigantine was abandoned in the Bay of Biscay. Her crew were rescued by the steamship Harbinger (United Kingdom).
Kalmia	(Dominion of Newfoundland) Newfoundland Colony	The ship ran aground on the Sandown Rock, in Trepassey Bay. She was on a voyage from Bahia, Brazil to Saint John's. She was later refloated with assistance from the steamship Hermes (Flag unknown).
Lass o'Gowrie	United Kingdom	The Thames barge collided with the steamship John Ormston (United Kingdom) and sank in the River Thames at Blackwall, Middlesex with the loss of her captain. Her mate was rescued by John Ormston.

== 4 February ==
List of shipwrecks: 4 February 1883
Ship	State	Description
Zephyr	United Kingdom	The brigantine was wrecked on the Blackwater Bank, in the Irish Sea off the coast of County Wexford. Her seven crew got aboard the Blackwater Lightship ( Trinity House), from where they were rescued by the Cahore Lifeboat. Zephyr was on a voyage from Liverpool, Lancashire to Cork.

== 5 February ==
List of shipwrecks: 5 February 1883
Ship	State	Description
Elvira	Sweden	The brig collided with the steamship Thomas Turnbull (United Kingdom) off Cape Palos, Spain and was severely damaged. She was towed in to Cartagena, Spain in a sinking condition.

== 6 February ==
List of shipwrecks: 6 February 1883
Ship	State	Description
Agnes	Germany	The barque was driven ashore on Texel, North Holland, Netherlands. She was on a voyage from Bremerhaven to Cardiff, Glamorgan, United Kingdom.
Alice Fisher	United Kingdom	The ship ran aground on the North Scar, off Walney Island, Lancashire. She was on a voyage from Connah's Quay, Flintshire to Workington, Cumberland. She was refloated, but had to be beached, being severely leaky.
Bertha	France	The ship foundered in the Great Silver Pit, 70 nautical miles (130 km; 81 mi) east by south of Spurn Point, Yorkshire, United Kingdom with the loss of all hands. She was on a voyage from Newcastle upon Tyne, Northumberland, United Kingdom to Hamburg, Germany and/or Toulon, Var.
Cactus	United Kingdom	The brig ran aground on the Black Middens, in the North Sea off the mouth of the River Tyne. Her crew were rescued by the South Shields Lifeboat Tom Perry ( Royal National Lifeboat Institution). Cactus was on a voyage from Blyth, Northumberland to Gravesend, Kent.
Charlotte	Germany	The full-rigged ship was driven ashore on Stronsay, Orkney Island, United Kingdom. Her 25 crew were rescued but her captain refused to abandon ship. She was on a voyage from Bremen and/or Antwerp, Belgium to New York, United States.
Clara	United Kingdom	The schooner was driven ashore and wrecked at "M'Cammon", County Down with the loss of five of her six crew. She was on a voyage from Maryport, Cumberland to Belfast, County Antrim.
Etta	United Kingdom	The steamship was driven ashore at Lisbon, Portugal. She was on a voyage from Newcastle upon Tyne, Northumberland to Lisbon.
Ocean Monarch	United Kingdom	The fishing smack foundered in the Great Silver Pit with the loss of all hands.
Orion	United Kingdom	The steamship was driven ashore on Texel. She was refloated and resumed her voyage.
Royal Sailor	United Kingdom	The brig ran aground in The Downs. She was on a voyage from South Shields, County Durham to Motril, Spain. She was refloated and put in to Ramsgate, Kent.
Savant	United Kingdom	The schooner was wrecked off Crail, Fife with the loss of two of her crew.

== 7 February ==
List of shipwrecks: 7 February 1883
Ship	State	Description
Ann	United Kingdom	The schooner was driven ashore and wrecked at "Collydram", Argyllshire with the loss of three of her crew.
Anna Louise	United Kingdom	The schooner was driven ashore at Hartlepool, County Durham with the loss of a crew member. Survivors were rescued by the Coastguard using breeches buoy. She was on a voyage from Seaham, County Durham to Southampton, Hampshire.
Beatrice	United Kingdom	The ship departed from the Llico River for Falmouth, Cornwall or Queenstown, County Cork. No further trace, reported overdue.
Daisy	United Kingdom	The tug stuck a floating log in the Clyde and sank. She was refloated and taken in to Greenock, Renfrewshire.
Kate	United Kingdom	The schooner ran aground on the Stag Rock. She was on a voyage from Newport, Monmouthshire to Cork. She was refloated with assistance from the tug Brilliant (United Kingdom).
Lina	Norway	The schooner struck rocks and sank off Deerness, Orkney Islands, United Kingdom with the loss of all hands.
Lorely	Germany	The barque was wrecked on the Shipwash Sand, in the North Sea off the coast of Suffolk, United Kingdom. Her 12 crew were rescued by the Harwich Lifeboat. She was on a voyage from Memel to London, United Kingdom. She later floated off and came ashore at Aldeburgh, Suffolk.
Surprise	France	The schooner was driven ashore and wrecked west of Overton Mere, Glamorgan, United Kingdom with the loss of all hands. The ship's dog survived. She was on a voyage from Paimpol, Finistère to Swansea, Glamorgan.

== 8 February ==
List of shipwrecks: 8 February 1883
Ship	State	Description
Ann	(United Kingdom of Great Britain and Ireland) Guernsey	The brig was driven ashore at South Shields, County Durham. Her crew were rescued by the South Shields Lifeboat and by rocket apparatus. She was consequently condemned.
Janet Izast	United Kingdom	The brigantine ran aground and was wrecked on the Black Middens, off the mouth of the River Tyne. Her crew were rescued by the South Shields Lifeboat.
Havre	France	The steamship ran aground in the Hooghly River. She was on a voyage from Calcutta, India to Marseille, Bouches-du-Rhône. She was refloated.
Margaret	United Kingdom	The schooner was driven ashore at Drummore Point, Wigtownshire. She was on a voyage from Bangor, Caernarfonshire to Glasgow, Renfrewshire.
Nega	Russia	The barque ran aground at South Shields. She was refloated and towed in to South Shields.
Padre Madre	Italy	The barque was abandoned in the Atlantic Ocean. Her crew were rescued by the steamship Thanemore (United Kingdom). Padre Madre was on a voyage from Baltimore, Maryland, United States to Dublin, United Kingdom.
Polymnia	Norway	The steamship ran aground and was wrecked on the Shipwash Sand, in the North Sea off the coast of Suffolk, United Kingdom. She was subsequently driven ashore on the coast of Essex, United Kingdom.
Progress	United Kingdom	The fishing smack was driven ashore at Tunstall, Yorkshire. Her crew were rescued.

== 9 February ==
List of shipwrecks: 9 February 1883
Ship	State	Description
Adam Smith	United Kingdom	The steamship ran aground at Kirkcaldy, Fife. She was on a voyage from London to Kirkcaldy.
Carl	Denmark	The schooner was abandoned at sea. Her crew were rescued. She was on a voyage from Hartlepool, County Durham, United Kingdom to "Faxo".
Criccieth Castle	United Kingdom	The brig was presumed lost off St Mary's, Isles of Scilly with the loss of all eleven crew. Wreckage and the body of a crew member washed ashore. She was on a voyage from Falmouth, Cornwall to Liverpool, Lancashire.
Golden Horn	United Kingdom	The steamship was driven ashore at Hartlepool. She was on a voyage from Hartlepool to Boston, Massachusetts, United States. She was refloated and put back to Hartlepool.
Isabel	United Kingdom	The brigantine was driven ashore at the Mumbles, Glamorgan. She was on a voyage from Llanelly, Glamorgan to Honfleur, Manche, France.
Ivanhoe	United Kingdom	The barque was driven ashore at Caernarfon. She was refloated.
Minnie	United Kingdom	The steamship ran agroundon the Black Middens, off the mouth of the River Tyne. She was on a voyage from Bilbao, Spain to South Shields, County Durham. She was refloated on 24 February and taken into the River Tyne for repairs.
Moth	United Kingdom	The ketch foundered in the English Channel 2 nautical miles (3.7 km) north east of the Old Harry Rocks, Dorset. Her crew survived. She was on a voyage from Southampton, Hampshire to Wareham, Dorset.
Prinses Marie	Netherlands	The ship ran aground in The Swale. She was on a voyage from Vlissingen, Zeeland to Queenborough, Kent, United Kingdom. She was refloated.
Timandra	United Kingdom	The ship was driven ashore at Silloth, Cumberland. She was on a voyage from Belfast, County Antrim to Maryport, Cumberland.

== 10 February ==
List of shipwrecks: 10 February 1883
Ship	State	Description
Mabel Annie	United Kingdom	The Mersey Flat sank off Fleetwood, Lancashire. Her crew survived.
Marnhull	United Kingdom	The brig ran aground and was wrecked on Pakefield Gat, in the North Sea off the coast of Suffolk with the loss of one of her six crew. Survivors were rescued by the Kessingland Lifeboat St. Michaels ( Royal National Lifeboat Institution). Marnhull was on a voyage from London to Middlesbrough, Yorkshire.
Rothbury	United Kingdom	The steamship ran aground on the Cross Sand, in the North Sea off the coast of Norfolk. She was refloated and resumed her voyage.
Tasmania	United Kingdom	The barque was driven ashore and wrecked at the mouth of the River Don. Her 21 crew were rescued by rocket apparatus. She was on a voyage from Algiers, Algeria to Aberdeen.

== 11 February ==
List of shipwrecks: 11 February 1883
Ship	State	Description
Madawaska Maid	United States	The fishing schooner was lost off Grand Manan, New Brunswick, Canada. Her crew were rescued.

== 12 February ==
List of shipwrecks: 12 February 1883
Ship	State	Description
Jane Gristow	United Kingdom	The brigantine stranded in Sandown Bay, Isle of Wight with the loss of one of her six crew.
Reine des Fleurs	France	The brigantine was driven ashore at West Cross, Glamorgan, United Kingdom. Her crew were rescued. She was on a voyage from Cannes, Alpes-Maritimes, to Swansea, Glamorgan.
Theresa	United Kingdom	The schooner was wrecked off Worthing, Sussex.
Unnamed	Flag unknown	The brig foundered in the North Sea.
Unnamed	Germany	The brigantine was wrecked in Plymouth Sound.
Two unnamed vessels	United Kingdom	Two fishing boats were seen bottom up in the North Sea.

== 14 February ==
List of shipwrecks: 14 February 1883
Ship	State	Description
Camilla	United Kingdom	The schooner was driven ashore at Hartlepool, County Durham. She was on a voyage from Seaham, County Durham to Portsmouth, Hampshire. She was refloated with assistance.
Erminia	United Kingdom	The barque collided with the steamship Gothland (United Kingdom) off the Galloper Sand, in the North Sea and was severely damaged. Erminia was on a voyage from Hamburg, Germany to Swansea, Glamorgan. She was towed in to Harwich, Essex by Gothland.
Express	Sweden	The steamship departed from Stockholm for Hanko, Grand Duchy of Finland. No further trace, reported overdue.

== 15 February ==
List of shipwrecks: 15 February 1883
Ship	State	Description
Adrienne	United Kingdom	The brig was abandoned in the Atlantic Ocean ((41°53′N 34°56′W) with the loss of a crew member. Survivors were rescued by the steamship Marcia (United Kingdom). Adrienne was on a voyage from New York, United States to Ayr.
Mary S. Gibson	Canada	The ship was sighted in distress in the Atlantic Ocean 42°50′N 33°50′W) whilst on a voyage from Baltimore, Maryland, United States to Havre de Grâce, Seine-Inférieure, France or Antwerp, Belgium. No further trace, reported missing.

== 16 February ==
List of shipwrecks: 16 February 1883
Ship	State	Description
Alfred	United Kingdom	The steamship was abandoned at sea. All on board were rescued by the steamship Wellfield (United Kingdom). Alfred was on a voyage from Smyrna, Ottoman Empire to Falmouth, Cornwall.
City of Richmond	United Kingdom	The steamship was driven ashore at Sandy Hook, New Jersey, United States. She was on a voyage from Liverpool, Lancashire to New York, United States.
Falcon	United Kingdom	The schooner put into Cairnryan, Wigtownshire on fire and was scuttled. She was on a voyage from Greenock, Renfrewshire to Buenos Aires, Argentina.
Glamorgan	United Kingdom	The steamship foundered in the Atlantic Ocean with the loss of seven of the 51 people on board. Survivors were rescued by the steamship Republic (United Kingdom), which lost a crew member effecting the rescue. Glamorgan was on a voyage from Liverpool to Boston, Massachusetts, United States.

== 17 February ==
List of shipwrecks: 17 February 1883
Ship	State	Description
Excel	United Kingdom	The fishing smack was run down and sunk in the English Channel off Dungeness, Kent. Her eight crew were rescued by the smack Superior (United Kingdom).
Fairy Belle	United Kingdom	The schooner was driven ashore in the Bristol Channel. She was on a voyage from Newquay, Cornwall to Cardiff, Glamorgan.
Thomas & John	United Kingdom	The dandy ran aground and sank at Newhaven, Sussex. Both crew were rescued by the Newhaven Lifeboat Michael Henry ( Royal National Lifeboat Institution). Thomas & John was on a voyage from Northfleet, Kent to Plymouth, Devon. She subsequently broke up.

== 18 February ==
List of shipwrecks: 18 February 1883
Ship	State	Description
USS Ashuelot	United States Navy	The Mohongo-class gunboat was wrecked on a rock off East Lamock Island with the loss of eleven of her crew. She was on a voyage from Amoy to Shantou, China.
Hekla	Denmark	The steamship ran aground on the Sydnostgrunden, off Larvik, Norway and was wrecked. She was on a voyage from Copenhagen, Denmark to New York, United States.

== 19 February ==
List of shipwrecks: 19 February 1883
Ship	State	Description
Nordstern	Germany	The steamship was driven ashore at Kastrup, Denmark.
Sarmatian	United Kingdom	The ship ran aground at Panaroekan, Netherlands East Indies. She was on a voyage from Surabaya, Netherland East Indies to Calcutta, India.

== 20 February ==
List of shipwrecks: 20 February 1883
Ship	State	Description
Strathdee	United Kingdom	The steamship collided with the steamship Buenos Ayrean (United Kingdom) and sank off the Isle of Arran with the loss of all but one of her twelve crew. The survivor was rescued by Buenos Ayrean. Strathdee was on a voyage from Glasgow, Renfrewshire to Dublin.

== 21 February ==
List of shipwrecks: 21 February 1883
Ship	State	Description
Alexandre	United Kingdom	The ship was driven ashore and wrecked at Tenby, Pembrokeshire. Her crew survived.
King Arthur	United Kingdom	The steamship was wrecked in the Bosphorus with the loss of eight of her crew. She was on a voyage from Constanţa, Romania to Cardiff, Glamorgan.

== 22 February ==
List of shipwrecks: 22 February 1883
Ship	State	Description
Clementia	United Kingdom	The ship was wrecked near Wexford. Her crew were rescued by rocket apparatus.
Ferro	Germany	The ship was driven ashore and sank at "Hammerin", Denmark.
King Arthur	United Kingdom	The steamship was wrecked near the Black Sea entrance of the Bosphorus. Thirteen crew took to the ship's boats, which capsized drowning the occupants. Her captain and the remaining crew were saved by the rocket apparatus.
Laura Gillies	United Kingdom	The steamship was wrecked at Bilbao, Spain. Her crew were rescued. She was on a voyage from Bilbao to Newcastle upon Tyne, Northumberland.

== 23 February ==
List of shipwrecks: 23 February 1883
Ship	State	Description
Gloucester City	United Kingdom	The ocean liner collided with ice floes and sank in the Atlantic Ocean. Her 28 crew were rescued by the steamship Frija (Flag unknown ). Gloucester City was on a voyage from Bristol, Gloucestershire to New York.
James Wilson	Victoria	The ship departed from Melbourne for Port Elizabeth, Cape Colony. No further trace, reported missing.

== 24 February ==
List of shipwrecks: 24 February 1883
Ship	State	Description
Washington	Germany	The ship departed from Copenhagen, Denmark for Greenock, Renfrewshire, United Kingdom. No further trace, reported missing.

== 25 February ==
List of shipwrecks: 25 February 1883
Ship	State	Description
Marbella	United Kingdom	The steamship ran aground on the North Gar Sand, at the mouth of the River Tees. She was on a voyage from the River Tees to Pomaron, Portugal. She was refloated with assistance from the tugs Cleveland, Harkaway and Nunthorpe (all United Kingdom) and put back to the River Tees.

== 27 February ==
List of shipwrecks: 27 February 1883
Ship	State	Description
Ashurst	United Kingdom	The steamship ran aground and sank at Walney Island, Lancashire. Her crew survived. Shew as on a voyage from Workington, Cumberland to Morecambe, Lancashire.
'William Dickinson	United Kingdom	The steamship was abandoned in the Mediterranean Sea 60 nautical miles (110 km) south east of Malta. Her crew were rescued, thirteen of them by HMS Hecla (Royal Navy).

== 28 February ==
List of shipwrecks: 28 February 1883
Ship	State	Description
Sligo	United Kingdom	The steamship ran aground in the Sligo River. She was on a voyage from Sligo to Liverpool, Lancashire.

== Unknown date ==
List of shipwrecks: Unknown date in February 1883
Ship	State	Description
Adèle	Germany	The barque was driven ashore at Sandy Hook, New Jersey, United States. She was on a voyage from Batavia, Netherlands East Indies to Sandy Hook.
Alfred	France	The schooner ran aground on the Haisborough Sands, in the North Sea off the coast of Norfolk, United Kingdom. She was on a voyage from Rouen, Seine-Inférieure to Newcastle upon Tyne, Northumberland, United Kingdom. She was refloated and beached at Mundesley, Norfolk.
Alsatia	United Kingdom	The steamship ran aground in the Suez Canal. She was on a voyage from Liverpool, Lancashire to Bombay, India. She was later refloated, and taken in to Suez, Egypt for repairs.
Ballogie	United Kingdom	The steamship caught fire 6 nautical miles (11 km) off Sagres Point, Portugal. She was on a voyage from Gibraltar to London.
Bennychree	United Kingdom	The schooner was wrecked at Peninver, Argyllshire. Her crew were rescued. She was on a voyage from Liverpool to Ayr.
Bona Fide	Norway	The barque was wrecked at Jarlshof, Shetland Island, United Kingdom.
Boscoppa	United Kingdom	The ship was driven ashore at Swansea, Glamorgan.
Celtic Monarch	United Kingdom	The ship was driven ashore in the Mississippi River. She was on a voyage from New Orleans, Louisiana, United States to Bremen, Germany. She was later refloated.
Charm	United Kingdom	The ship was driven ashore at Lindisfarne, Northumberland. She was refloated.
Clementia	United Kingdom	The barque was driven ashore and wrecked at Kilmore, County Wexford.
Conqueror	United Kingdom	The schooner ran aground off New Romney, Kent. She was on a voyage from Goole, Yorkshire to Plymouth, Devon. She was refloated and assisted in to Dover, Kent in a leaky condition.
Copernicus	Belgium	The steamship was wrecked at Porto de Pedras, Brazil between 10 and 28 February. She was on a voyage from Liverpool to Bahia, Brazil.
Danish Monarch	United Kingdom	The steamship ran aground on the Morant Cays and was wrecked.
Deux Maries	France	The brigantine was wrecked at Porto Plata, Virgin Islands, Her crew were rescued. She was on a voyage from Trinidad to Cap-Haïtien, Haiti.
Dream	United Kingdom	The ship sprang a leak. She was towed in to Hartlepool, County Durham, where she sank.
Dryburgh Abbey	United Kingdom	The ship ran aground on the Moselle Shoals. She was on a voyage from Liverpool to New Orleans. She was refloated and resumed her voyage.
Eddystone	United Kingdom	The steamship was driven ashore at Petten, North Holland, Netherlands. She was on a voyage from Hull, Yorkshire to Amsterdam, North Holland.
Eliza	United Kingdom	The ketch was driven ashore at Lymington, Hampshire. Her crew were rescued.
Fanny	United Kingdom	The smack was driven ashore at Aberthaw, Glamorgan.
Faraday	United Kingdom	The steamship ran aground on the West Bank, off New York, United States. She was on a voyage from New York to Liverpool.
Figogna	Italy	The barque was driven ashore 20 nautical miles (37 km) south of Cape Henry, Virginia, United States. She was on a voyage from Cartagena, Spain to Baltimore, Maryland, United States.
Frances	Flag unknown	The barge was wrecked on the West Hinder Bank, in the North Sea off the coast of Zeeland, Netherlands with the loss of one of her two crew. Her captain was rescued by a Dutch pilot boat.
Gironde	France	The chasse-marée was lost off Le Verdon-sur-Mer, Gironde. Her crew were rescued.
Hannah and Eleanor	United Kingdom	The ship was driven ashore at Tynemouth, Northumberland. She subsequently broke up.
Japan	Germany	The barquentine was abandoned in the Atlantic Ocean before 26 February. Her crew were rescued by Galatea (United States). Japan was on a voyage from New York to London.
Jessica	United Kingdom	The barque was abandoned at sea. Her crew were rescued. She was on a voyage from Talcahuano, Chile to the English Channel.
Jessie Shuttleworth	United Kingdom	The schooner was wrecked at Tangiers, Morocco with the loss of all hands.
Kneginja Milena	Trieste	The ship was driven ashore at Aldeburgh, Suffolk, United Kingdom. She was on a voyage from Fiume, Austria-Hungary to Dunkirk, Nord, France.
Knight Templar	United Kingdom	The ship was damaged by fire at Sevastopol, Russia.
Labarronere	Spain	The ship ran aground at Portugalete.
Lightning	United Kingdom	The steamship was driven ashore at Garston, Lancashire. She was on a voyage from Garston to Bordeaux, Gironde, France. She was refloated on 9 February.
Mary Stewart	United Kingdom	The ship ran aground in the Savannah River.
Minnie Hunter	United States	The ship was driven ashore and sank at Cape Henelopen, Delaware.
Parkfield	United Kingdom	The ship was driven ashore at New York. She was on a voyage from Calcutta, India to New York.
Plate	New South Wales	The steamship ran aground at the mouth of the Richmond River.
Raffaele	Italy	The brig was driven ashore. She was on a voyage from Phillippeville, Algeria to Huelva, Spain. She was refloated with the assistance of a tug and found to be severely leaky.
Sarah	Norway	The barque was abandoned in the Atlantic Ocean before 23 February.
Sirena	United Kingdom	The schooner was driven ashore at Maisí, Cuba. Some of her crew were rescued, others reported missing. She was on a voyage from Marseille, Bouches-du-Rhône to Havana, Cuba.
Snowdrop	United Kingdom	The schooner was wrecked in the English Channel with loss of life. Some of the bodies of her crew were washed ashore on the Isle of Wight on 5 February.
Tees Force	United Kingdom	The ship was wrecked in the Abaco Islands, Bahamas before 3 February. She was on a voyage from Savanilla, Mexico to Havre de Grâce, Seine-Inférieure, France.
Thetford	United Kingdom	The steamship ran aground at Cienfuegos, Cuba and was damaged. She was refloated and put back to Cienfuegos.
Victoria	United Kingdom	The fishing smack was driven ashore at Lymington. Her crew were rescued.
