= MP 14 =

MP 14 may refer to:

- MP 14 (Paris Metro)
- USAMP Colonel Horace F. Spurgin (MP-14)
- Vehicle number plates beginning with MP-14 Mandsaur district
- Lutetian
- 4-HO-αMT, a psychedelic drug
