= Zeno Secor & Company =

19th-century American shipbuilding firm

The Zeno Secor & Company was an American shipbuilding firm. Their principal offices were in New York City. Its shipyard was located in Jersey City, New Jersey.

== History ==
=== Founding ===
The company was formed by Zeno Secor along with his brothers Francis M. Secor and Charles A. Secor succeeded to this business and enlarged it to such an extent that before the Civil War began his name had become widely known.

=== 1850s ===
The US Navy had no expertise in building ironclad warships. The contracts for its first three ironclads incorporated elements of the successful 1854 frigate and 1857 and 1858 sloop programs. The contracts were for fixed prices. Earlier, the Navy had built its ships almost exclusively in Navy shipyards, under the complete control of the Navy Department. Ship acquisition typically involved long construction times for small numbers of ships, Navy control of the process from design to finished product, and responsiveness to input from the line officers who would sail the ships.

When the Navy wanted shipyards and drydocks notably the Pensacola Naval Station Bulkhead and Wet Basin (Structures #178 and 177) and Mare Island Navy Yard in San Francisco, Francis Secor built them in 1852 and 1853.

=== Civil War ===
When monitors and other armored craft were needed, the Secor Company received the contracts. It built the first of the newer Passaic-class monitor, USS Weehawken in 1862.

Prosperity returned with the war, and when the opportunity arose in 1862, the Secors began to build monitors. They gave up a small shipyard in New York and contracted with Joseph Colwell (Junior), to establish a shipyard and machine shop in Jersey City. They subcontracted the work on the Weehawken and Camanche to Colwell who does not appear to have had any more shipbuilding experience than the Secors.

During the Civil War, Secor Brothers constructed at least five ironclads to the United States Government: (two ships not listed).

Ships Listed as Built by the Secor Family & Partnerships
Ship Name	Year built	Ship Class	Ship Type	Ship Builder
USS Weehawken (1862)	1862	Passaic	Ironclad Monitor	Zeno Secor and Company
USS Camanche (1864)	1864	Passaic	Ironclad Monitor	Donohue, Ryan & Secor Company
USS Mahopac (1864)	1864	Canonicus	Ironclad Monitor	Secor & Company
