= USS Camanche =

USS Camanche may refer to the following ships of the United States Navy:

- USS Camanche (1864), a 1,335-ton Passaic-class monitor, was prefabricated at Jersey City, New Jersey by Secor Brothers, Co.
- USS Camanche (ACM-11), properly Camanche (ACM-11) as the ship was never commissioned, was the lead ship of the Camanche-class minelayers.
