= MP 1 =

MP 1 or MP-1 may refer to:

- MP 1, an abbreviation for a zone during the Paleocene
- MP-1, an American auxiliary minelayer ship
- MP-1, a car manufactured by Toyota
- MP-1, a Russian Beriev biplane
