= USS Winnipec =

Mohongo-class gunboat

History

United States
- Name: USS Winnipec
- Builder: Harrison Loring, Boston, Massachusetts
- Launched: 20 August 1864
- Completed: 1864 at Boston
- In service: 1865
- Out of service: 1867
- Fate: Sold to Mr. Thomas Clyde on 17 June 1869

General characteristics
- Type: Gunboat
- Displacement: 1,030 tons
- Length: 225 ft 0 in (68.58 m)
- Beam: 35 ft 0 in (10.67 m)
- Draft: 5 ft 8 in (1.73 m) (aft)
- Depth of hold: 12 ft 0 in (3.66 m)
- Propulsion: steam engine, side-wheel propelled
- Armor: iron-hulled,

USS Winnipec was a Mohongo-class gunboat built for the Union Navy during the final days of the American Civil War. There is no indication she was used in the war, but records indicate she was assigned to the United States Naval Academy at Annapolis, Maryland, for use as a schoolship. She was eventually sold in 1868.

== Built in Massachusetts ==
Winnipec—a double-ended, iron-hulled, sidewheel gunboat—was built in 1864 at Boston, Massachusetts, by Harrison Loring. The ship was launched on 20 August 1864, but there is no record of her having been commissioned during the American Civil War or any portion of the year 1865.

== Training ship for the Academy ==
Deck logs exist for Winnipec during the period 1 January to 6 October 1866, at which time she was assigned to the United States Naval Academy at Annapolis, Maryland, as a practice ship. Winnipec remained so assigned until late in 1867 when she moved to Norfolk, Virginia, for repairs.

== Decommissioning ==
In 1868, Winnipec was placed in ordinary at Norfolk and remained in that status until she was sold to Mr. Thomas Clyde on 17 June 1869.

== See also ==
- Union Blockade
