= Camanche (ACM-11) =

Former U.S. Army Mine Planter acquired by the Navy

History

United States
- Name: Brigadier General Royal T. Frank (Army); ACM-11, MMA-11 and Camanche (Navy)
- Launched: 1942 as USAMP Brigadier General Royal T. Frank for the US Army
- Acquired: by the US Navy 1944
- Decommissioned: Never commissioned
- Reclassified: ACM-11; reclassified MMA-11, 7 February 1945; Renamed Camanche 1 May 1945 while in Atlantic Reserve Fleet
- Identification: IMO number: 7730692
- Fate: Transferred to Atlantic Reserve Fleet on acquisition from Army in 1944; Sold commercial, 1948 to become Pilgrim and later the Cape Cod.

General characteristics
- Class & type: ACM-11 class auxiliary minelayer
- Displacement: 1,300 long tons (1,321 t) full
- Length: 189 ft (58 m)
- Beam: 37 ft (11 m)
- Draft: 12 ft (3.7 m)
- Propulsion: Two Combustion Engineering header type boilers, two 1,200shp Skinner Unaflow reciprocating engines, no reduction gear, two shafts.
- Speed: 12 knots (22 km/h; 14 mph)

Camanche (ACM-11/MMA-11) was the name given in 1945 to the former U.S. Army Mine Planter (USAMP) Brigadier General Royal T. Frank (MP-12) while in naval inactive reserve more than ten years after acquisition of the ship by Navy from the Army in 1944. The ship had previously been classified by the Navy as an Auxiliary Mine Layer (ACM) and then Minelayer, Auxiliary (MMA). The ship was never commissioned by Navy and thus never bore the "USS" prefix.

== Construction ==
The ship was laid down as Hull Number 485 and launched in 1942 by Marietta Manufacturing Co., Point Pleasant, West Virginia for the U.S. Army Mine Planter Service as the USAMP Brigadier General Royal T. Frank (MP-12).

She was the second Army mine planter named for the Civil War era officer with the first, built in 1909, being converted to an inter island transport in Hawaii operating as the U.S.A.T. Royal T. Frank which was sunk by torpedo from the Japanese submarine I-171 on 9 January 1942 while carrying Army recruits with the loss of thirty-three lives.

== U.S. Army Coast Artillery Corps Service ==
The Frank's embarked crew was, in Army terminology implemented November 1942, designated the 19th Coast Artillery Mine Planter Battery stationed at Fort Miles, Delaware. The 19th Coast Artillery Mine Planter Battery was activated 28 November 1942 at Fort Hancock, New York and was directed to Point Pleasant, West Virginia to man the USAMP Brigadier General Royal T. Frank (MP-12) which on 1 April 1943 was assigned to Fort Miles guarding the entrance to Delaware Bay. There the ship and battery joined the 12th Coast Artillery Mine Planter Battery embarked in USAMP 1st Lt. William G. Sylvester (MP-5) for the maintenance of the mine fields which during that year were being changed from the M3 Buoyant Mines to 455 mines of the much more powerful M4 Ground Mine type carrying a 3000-pound TNT charge planted in thirty-five groups of thirteen mines each.

The ship's cable capability was to be used not only to maintain the mine control cables but the three hydrophone sets and the indicator loops acting as sensors in the approaches to the mine field.

== Inactive Naval Service ==
Upon acquisition in 1944 the Navy renamed the Auxiliary Mine Layer ACM-11 and, upon reclassification to Minelayer, Auxiliary on 7 February 1945, MMA-11. On 1 May 1945 the name Camanche was given the vessel. The name had previously been used for an 1863/1864 monitor. As the lead ship of the second group of Army mine planters transferred to Navy the ship gave its name to the Camanche-class auxiliary mine layers that, with the single exception of the Miantonomah (ACM-13/MMA-13), were immediately placed in reserve and never commissioned, converted or deployed. The ship was sold in 1948 to become the Pilgrim and later the Cape Cod.

== Namesakes ==
=== Royal T. Frank ===
Royal T. Frank was a career officer in the United States Army who graduated from West Point in 1858 and served until his retirement in 1899. He received two brevets (honorary promotions) for gallantry in action during the American Civil War. He was commissioned as a brigadier general of volunteers during the Spanish–American War. He was a member of the Military Order of the Loyal Legion of the United States and the Sons of the Revolution.

=== Comanche ===
The Comanche tribe is a Native American tribe from the Great Plains of the southwestern United States.

== See also ==
- Fort Miles-Support – Mine Plotting Room (Mine Casemate)
- Fort Miles-Fire Control Tower No. 7 (mine fire control)
