= USS Muscoota =

Mohongo-class gunboat

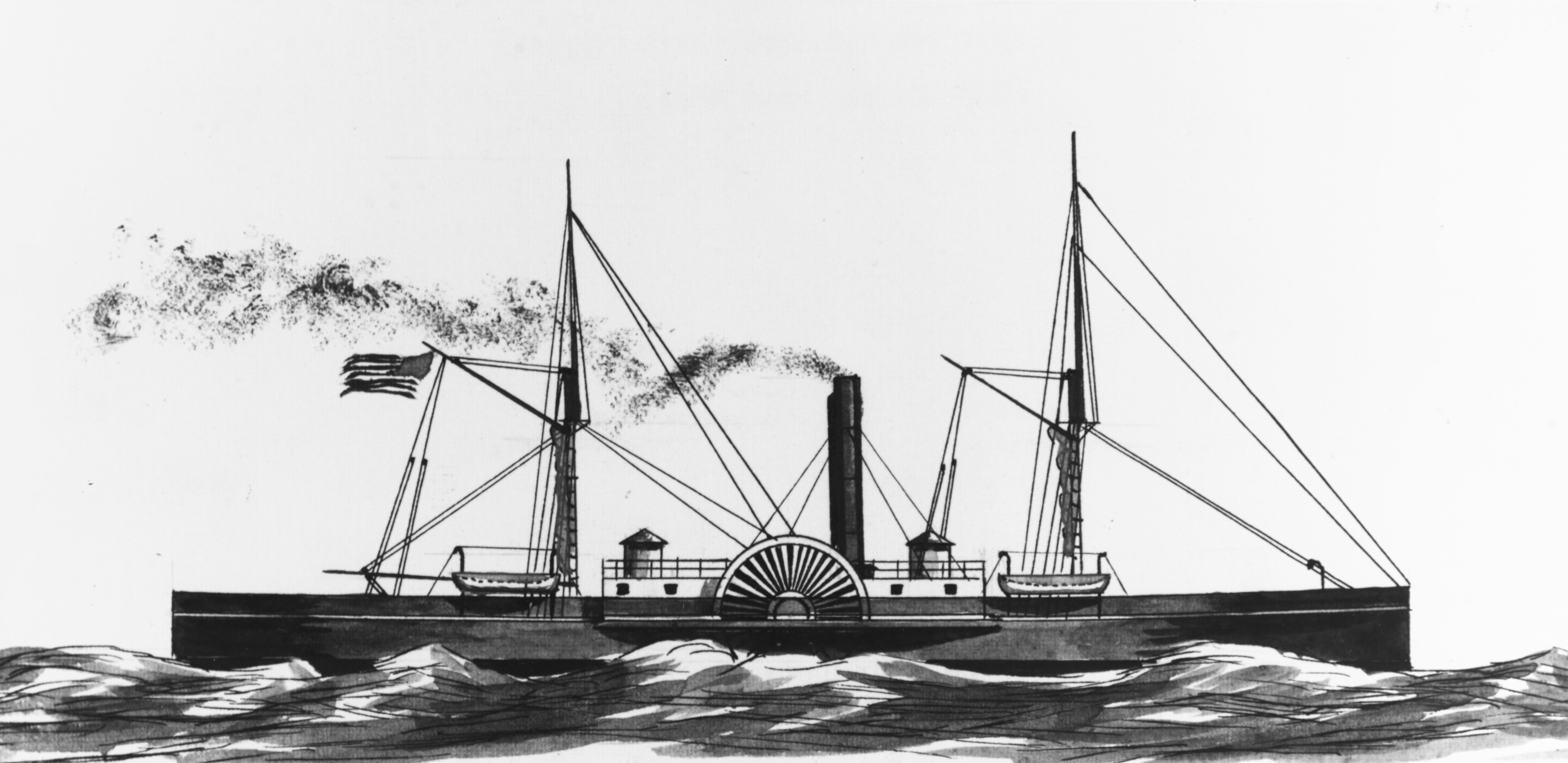
- USS Muscoota - watercolor by Erik Heyl

History

United States
- Name: USS Muscoota
- Builder: Greenpoint, New York
- Commissioned: January 1865
- Fate: Sold into merchant service, June 1869; Destroyed by fire, 29 June 1870

General characteristics
- Type: Iron side-wheel steam gunboat
- Tonnage: 1,370 long tons (1,392 t)

USS Muscoota, was a 1370-ton Mohongo-class iron "double-ender" steam gunboat of the United States Navy during the American Civil War.

The ship was built at Greenpoint, New York, and commissioned in January 1865. She was at Norfolk, Virginia, in May 1865 when ordered to Key West as part of an effort to prevent Confederate President Jefferson Davis escaping abroad. Muscoota remained in the Gulf of Mexico area at least until August 1866, when she was sent north in response to a serious outbreak of yellow fever among her crew. George Westinghouse, future inventor and businessman, served aboard the warship as an engineer.

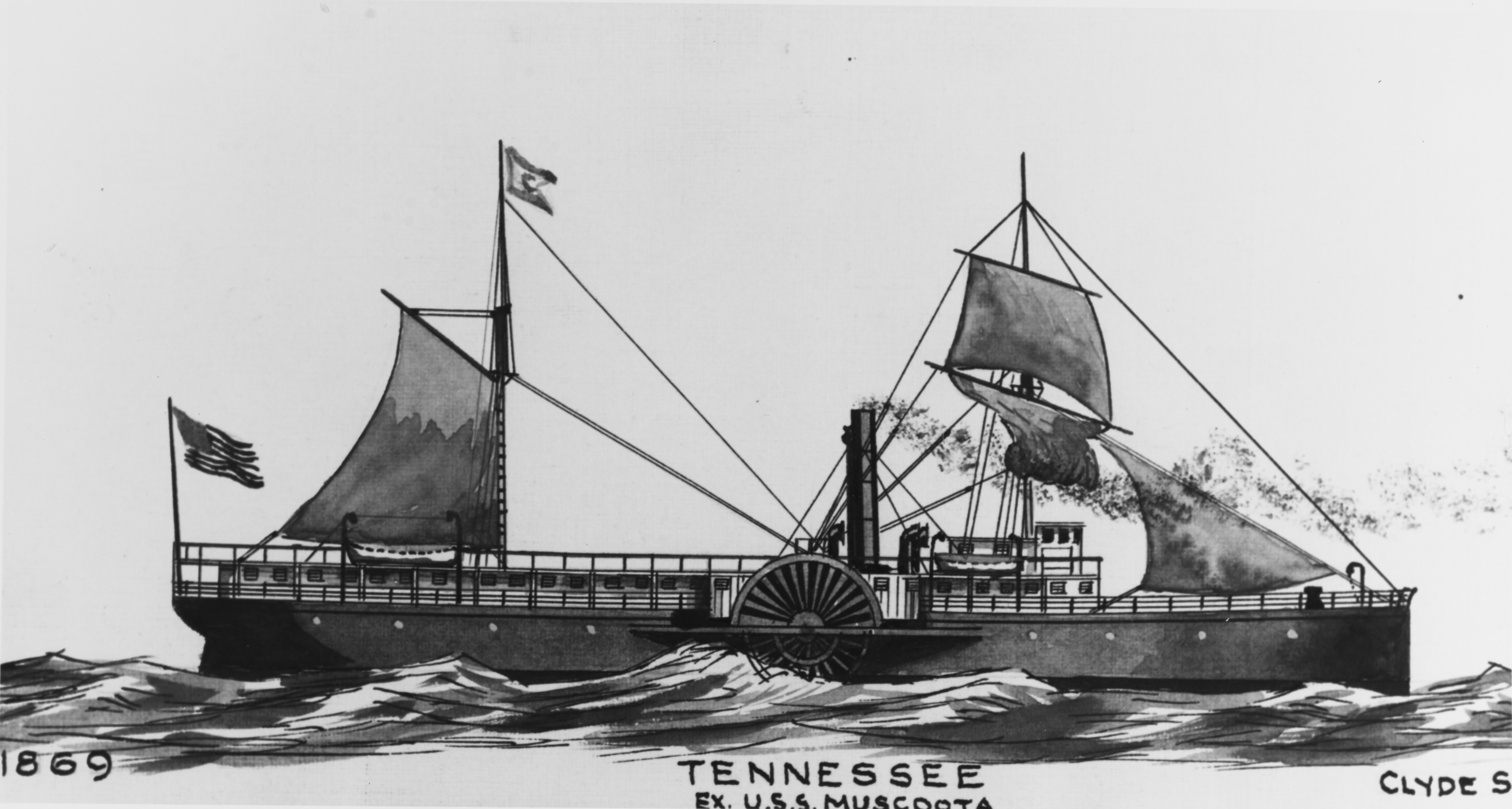
SS Tennessee after her refit into a merchant ship

Sold in June 1869, she was extensively rebuilt for merchant employment and renamed Tennessee. The ship had only a short civilian career, as she was destroyed by fire near Little River, North Carolina, on 29 June 1870.
