= USS Weehawken (1862) =

Coordinates: 32.7157°N 79.8903°W

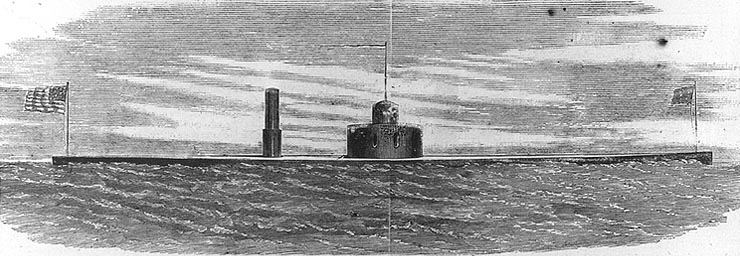
- USS Weehawken

History

United States
- Name: USS Weehawken
- Builder: Secor
- Launched: 5 November 1862
- Sponsored by: Ms. Nellie Cornstock
- Commissioned: 18 January 1863
- Fate: Sunk at anchor, 6 December 1863

General characteristics
- Class & type: Passaic-class ironclad monitor
- Displacement: 1,173 long tons (1,192 t)
- Length: 200 ft (61 m) o/a
- Beam: 46 ft (14 m)
- Draft: 10 ft 6 in (3.20 m)
- Installed power: 320 ihp (240 kW)
- Propulsion: 1 × Ericsson vibrating lever engine; 2 × Martin boilers; 1 × shaft
- Speed: 5 kn (5.8 mph; 9.3 km/h)
- Complement: 75 officers and enlisted
- Armament: 1 × 15 in (380 mm) smoothbore gun, 1 × 11 in (280 mm) Dahlgren gun
- Armor: Side: 3–5 in (7.6–12.7 cm); Turret: 11 in (28 cm); Deck: 1 in (2.5 cm)
- Notes: Armor is iron.

The first USS Weehawken was a Passaic-class ironclad monitor in the United States Navy during the American Civil War. She was named after Weehawken, New Jersey.

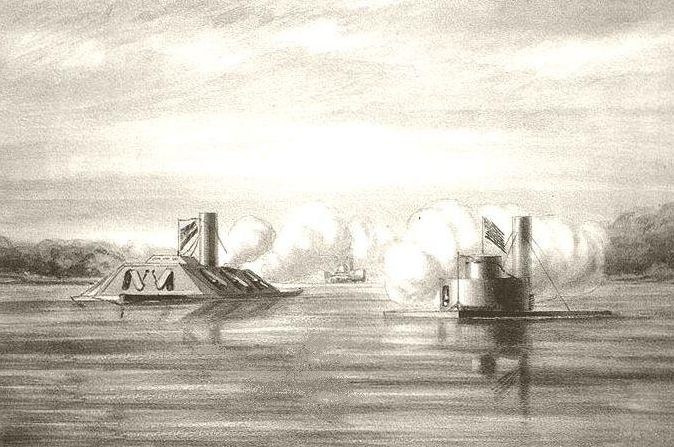
A drawing of Weehawken capturing CSS Atlanta, 17 June 1863

== History ==
Weehawken was launched on 5 November 1862 at Jersey City, New Jersey by Zeno Secor & Company; sponsored by Ms. Nellie Cornstock; and commissioned on 18 January 1863, Captain John Rodgers in command.

Weehawken was an improved and enlarged version of Monitor. Accompanied by Iroquois and towed by Boardman, she departed New York on 18 January 1863, bound for Port Royal, South Carolina, and duty with the South Atlantic Blockading Squadron. The three vessels encountered gale-force winds and high seas off the New Jersey coast on 20 January. Iroquois and Boardman headed for sheltered waters; but Rodgers pressed on in Weehawken. The Passaic ironclads differed from the original Monitor in having less deck overhang and a rounded lower hull. This enabled Weehawken – unlike her famous prototype – to ride out a heavy sea with relative ease. Rodgers reported that "the behavior of the vessel was easy, buoyant, and indicative of thorough safety." Weehawken put into Norfolk for minor repairs, leaving on 1 February in tow of screw steamer Lodona. She arrived at Port Royal on 5 February, and deployed in the blockade off Charleston, South Carolina.

On 7 April, Weehawken led the Union fleet in the first major naval assault against Confederate installations in Charleston harbor. The attack failed miserably, and the fleet withdrew after only 40 minutes. During the action, Weehawken took 59 hits and had a torpedo (naval mine) explode beneath her keel without suffering serious damage. Shortly after the attack, Rear Admiral John A. Dahlgren replaced Rear Admiral Samuel Francis DuPont as commander of the squadron.

After repairs, Weehawken proceeded to Wassaw Sound, Georgia, on 10 June to block the expected sortie of ironclad CSS Atlanta. The Confederate ram and two escort steamers showed themselves early on the morning of 17 June. Weehawken and Nahant weighed anchor to meet Atlanta which ran hard aground only moments after entering the sound. Weehawken commenced firing at 05:15 and ceased a quarter of an hour later when the Confederate vessel surrendered. With only five shots, Rodgers blew the roof off Atlanta's pilothouse and pierced the grounded ram's casemate, putting two gun crews out of action. Capt. Rodgers became a national hero and received commendations from Secretary of the Navy Gideon Welles, President Abraham Lincoln, and Congress. He was promoted to commodore and ordered north to command the new ironclad Dictator. Both Weehawken and Atlanta returned to Port Royal.

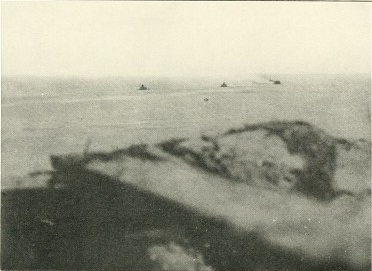
Union ironclads Weehawken, Montauk, and Passaic shelling Fort Moultrie. Photograph taken from ramparts of Fort Sumter

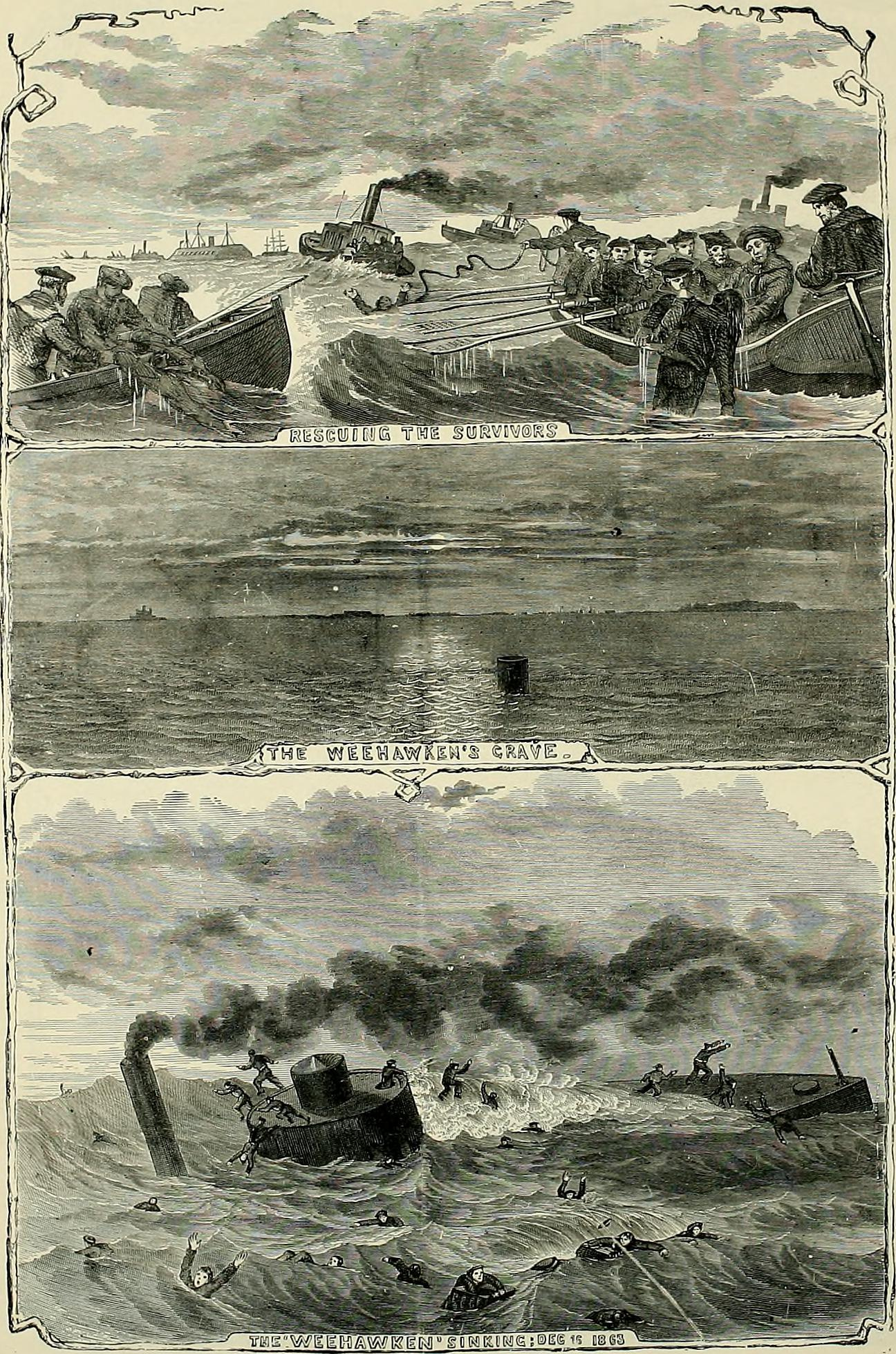
Death of the Weehawken

Weehawken resumed operations against Confederate strongholds in and around Charleston harbor. On 10–11 July, Union ironclads Catskill, Montauk, Nahant, and Weehawken shelled Confederate batteries at Fort Wagner on Morris Island, South Carolina, to cover an Army amphibious landing under Brigadier General Quincy A. Gillmore. Despite additional bombardments on 18 and 24 July, the monitors failed to silence the fort, leaving General Gillmore's troops pinned down on the beach caught between a murderous hail of cross fire. Fort Wagner was finally reduced during a naval bombardment of Forts Gregg, Sumter, and Moultrie on 17 August.

Weehawken, Montauk, Nahant, Passaic, and Patapsco now took aim at Fort Sumter, pounding it to rubble during two separate bombardments on 23 August and 1–2 September. Admiral Dahlgren demanded Sumter's surrender on 7 September and ordered Weehawken to deploy in a narrow channel between the fort and Cumming's Point on Morris Island. There, Weehawken grounded, taking concentrated gunfire from Fort Moultrie and Sullivan's and James Island. The vessel was refloated with the help of tugs on 8 September, and received a "Well done!" from Admiral Dahlgren for outstanding defensive gunnery while aground. Weehawken repaired at Port Royal until 4 October, then returned to Charleston for routine patrol duty in the harbor.

The next two months were uneventful, and Weehawken lay anchored off Morris Island during a moderate gale early on the morning of 6 December. Suddenly, the ironclad signalled for assistance and appeared to observers ashore to be sinking. Attempts to beach the vessel failed, and she sank bow first five minutes later in 30 ft (9.1 m) of water. A court of inquiry found that Weehawken had recently taken on a considerable amount of heavy ammunition in her forward compartments. This change excessively reduced her forward freeboard, causing water to rush down an open hawsepipe and hatch during the storm. As the bow sank, and the stern rose, water could not flow aft to the pumps and the vessel foundered.

Four officers and 27 enlisted men drowned aboard Weehawken.

== Bibliography ==
- Additional technical data from Gardiner, Robert (1979). Conway's All the World's Fighting Ships 1860–1905. Conway Maritime Press. p. 120. ISBN 0-85177-133-5.
