= Denmead Foundry =

Denmead was a Baltimore, Maryland, United States, company that produced about 30 steam locomotives in the 1850s as a sideline to a very successful foundry.

During the American Civil War, A & W Denmead & Son built the side wheel gunboat Monocacy and the light draft monitor Waxsaw, both completed in 1865.
