= USS Ashuelot =

Mohongo-class gunboat

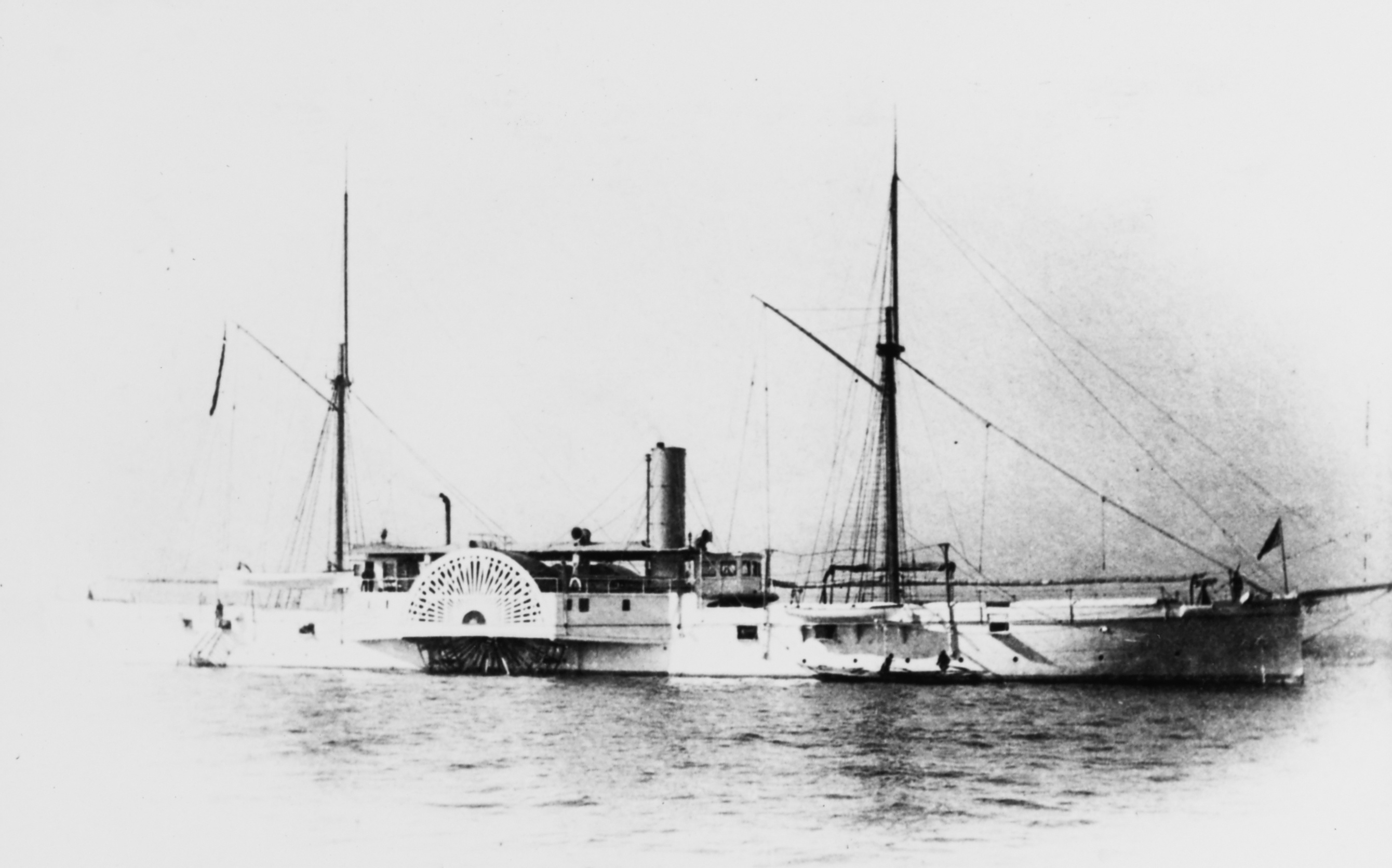
- USS Ashuelot, circa 1874

History

United States
- Name: Ashuelot
- Ordered: June/July 1863
- Builder: Donald McKay
- Laid down: 1864
- Launched: 22 July 1865
- Commissioned: 4 April 1866
- Fate: Wrecked, 18 February 1883

General characteristics
- Type: Gunboat
- Displacement: 1,370 long tons (1,392 t)
- Length: 225 ft (69 m)
- Beam: 35 ft (11 m)
- Draft: 9 ft (2.7 m)
- Propulsion: Steam engine
- Speed: 8 knots (15 km/h; 9.2 mph)
- Armament: 4 × 8 in (200 mm) smoothbore Dahlgren gun; 2 × 60-pounder Parrott rifles; 2 × 24-pounder howitzers; 2 × 20-pounder Parrott rifles

USS Ashuelot was an iron-hulled, double-ended, side-wheel Mohongo-class gunboat in the United States Navy. She was named for a river in New Hampshire.

The contract for the construction of Ashuelot was awarded in June or July 1863 to Donald McKay. Her keel was laid down at his shipyard in East Boston, Massachusetts, sometime in 1864; and the ship was launched on 22 July 1865. She was delivered to the Boston Navy Yard on 30 November of that year; but, since the American Civil War had recently ended, the Navy's need for her services had diminished. As a result, Ashuelot — which had been designed for operations in the shallow rivers and coastal waters of the Confederacy — was not placed in commission until 4 April 1866, Commander John C. Febiger in command.

== Service history ==
=== Maiden voyage, 1866–1867 ===
About this time, the new gunboat was chosen to join Augusta in escorting the double-ended monitor Miantonomoh to Europe. On the 11th, Ashuelot got underway to test her machinery and to assess her sailing qualities before joining her future consorts at New York. The three ships stood out from that port on 6 May and headed for Canadian waters. However, two days out, Commander Alexander Murray of Augusta—who commanded the little task force—dispatched Ashuelot to Boston, Massachusetts, to await the arrival of Assistant Secretary of the Navy Gustavus Vasa Fox, President Andrew Johnson's personal representative in carrying to Saint Petersburg the Joint Resolution of Congress congratulating Tsar Alexander II on having escaped unscathed from a recent assassination attempt. After embarking her distinguished passenger, Ashuelot got underway again, threaded her way through a field of icebergs that obstructed the approaches to the coast of Nova Scotia; and rejoined the flotilla at Halifax on 3 June. There, Fox—who wished to demonstrate the seaworthiness of monitors which, up to that time, had never crossed the Atlantic—moved to Miantonomoh for the voyage.

The trio put to sea two days later and reached Queenstown, Ireland, on the 16th. At this port, Ashuelot—which had long been slated for duty in the Far East—was detached from her companions and proceeded via the Cape of Good Hope, the Indian Ocean, and the Straits of Malacca to the western Pacific. She finally joined the Asiatic Squadron at Hong Kong on 15 January 1867 and served in Oriental waters throughout her career.

=== 1867–1870 ===
The double-ender's first memorable mission began at Amoy early in April of that year when the captain of the Royal Navy's HMS Cormorant informed Rear Admiral Henry H. Bell, the commander of the United States Squadron, that "aboriginals" had murdered the survivors from Rover after that American merchant bark had been wrecked on rocks just off the southern coast of Taiwan (Formosa). Bell ordered Febiger—then at Fuzhou—to proceed in Ashuelot to that island to investigate. When the gunboat returned from Formosa with evidence confirming the tragedy, Bell launched a punitive expedition against the guilty tribesmen (see Formosa Expedition), but left Ashuelot on the mainland coast to look after American interests in various Chinese treaty ports. The double-ender continued to perform this duty into the early spring of 1868.

In Japan at that time, civil disturbances followed the abolition of the shogunate and the assumption of supreme political power by the Emperor Meiji, drawing Ashuelot to the island empire. She reached Nagasaki on 6 April and, with her sister American warships, remained neutral while furnishing refuge to endangered American citizens and foreigners. She also offered asylum to Japanese officials of both sides who felt themselves to be imperiled.

However, late in the spring, unrest in northern China caused Ashuelot to return to the Asiatic mainland. She put to sea on 17 June and, six days later, reached Tianjin—then menaced by Chinese rebels. She worked along the coast of northern China until sailing for Japan late in August. She moved from port to port along the coast of Asia and among the nearby islands, reaffirming the American presence and power in that part of the world, frequently seeking out trouble spots so that she might be on hand as a haven for endangered Americans and for others in peril—native and foreign alike.

=== 1870–1871 ===
As the years passed, the squadron increasingly took advantage of Ashuelot's comparatively shallow draft and the great maneuverability which sprang from her double-ended configuration by using her more and more in riverine operations. Thus, after the massacre of 22 Europeans—including 10 nuns—in June 1870, she departed Shanghai and proceeded north to the mouth of the Hai River which she reached on 26 July. She then ascended that river to Tianjin where the atrocity had occurred and remained at that ancient city into the spring of the following year. She got underway again on 23 April 1871 when the ice of the river had thawed allowing her to put to sea once more. From that time on, Ashuelot and her sister warships of the Asiatic Squadron frequently spent the winter locked in by the frozen waters of a northern port.

Her next assignment was scheduled to be participation in the expedition to Korea headed by Rear Admiral John Rodgers seeking redress for the murder of the crew of the General Sherman. That American merchant schooner had run aground on a sandbar in the Taedong River during a trading mission and had been burned. However, a board of survey found that Ashuelot's hull had suffered significant damage during her icebound months and that both her engine and her boilers required major repairs before she could resume active duty. Thus, she was compelled to relinquish her role in operations during the spring of 1871 to open Korea.

Her yard work at Shanghai had been completed by autumn when word of serious unrest in southeastern China sent her to the province of Fujian. She arrived at Fuzhou on 21 October and remained there until 29 December 1871 when she headed back toward Shanghai.

=== 1872–1874 ===
But for a run to Taiwan early in March to carry the American consul at Amoy and his staff to that island, Ashuelot operated along the China coast between Shanghai and Hong Kong until sailing for Japan late in May 1872. She reached Nagasaki on 1 June and remained in Japanese waters for two months before moving to northern China. The ship arrived at Yantai on 3 September, reached Tianjin a fortnight later, and began another mission protecting American interests in that vicinity into the summer of 1873.

After being relieved by the screw gunboat Saco, the ship sailed for Nagasaki on 5 July and operated in Japanese waters until the spring of 1874 when—commanded by Comdr. Edmund Matthews—she sailed for China and reached Shanghai on 20 April. On 3 May, the side-wheeler sent a force ashore to join a landing party from the gunboat Yantic and contingents from other foreign warships in putting down a riot and in protecting the international settlement at that city.

=== Exploring the Yangtze, 1874 ===
Five days later, Ashuelot got underway to survey the Li-Sye-Chan Channel and—after completing that task—arrived at Zhenjiang on 16 May. Following a call on the daotai of that region, Matthews headed upstream and reached Nanjing on the 21st. There he learned that the viceroy was deeply troubled by reports of a Japanese expedition to Formosa and assured him that the United States was not participating in the invasion.

At each stop during his continuing ascent—Jiujiang, Wuchang, Hankou, Fow-Kow, and Guizhoufu—the ship's captain exchanged courtesies with the local officials. After Ashuelot crossed Dongting Lake, she found that rapid current, sharp bends, and the narrowing of the stream significantly slowed her progress and greatly increased the difficulty and danger of her movement. As a result, soon after the ship reached Yichang, Matthews and a small party of officers and guests disembarked and made an eight-day march on up the Yangtze Valley to determine whether or not it would be prudent for him to attempt to take the ship still higher. The overland journey brought the party to Guizhoufu. After a two-day visit, the Americans boarded a junk which took them back downriver to the Ashuelot at Yichang. Matthews' observation of the gorges and rapids during the return passage convinced him that only an especially designed and highly powerful paddle-wheel steamer—whose wheels were powered independently by separate engines—could safely negotiate that part of the upper Yangtze.

Thus, instead of continuing the voyage inland after returning to his ship, Matthews turned the vessel seaward and reached Shanghai on 21 July. Nevertheless, Ashuelot's exploratory voyage from Shanghai to Yichang had blazed a watery trail almost a thousand miles into China—one to be followed until the eve of World War II by the long list of American riverine men-of-war known as the Yangtze Patrol.

=== 1874–1875 ===
The gunboat sailed for Japan on 3 August 1874 and reached Nagasaki on the 5th to await a party of scientists - headed by the noted American astronomer, Professor James Craig Watson—which had been sent to the Orient to observe the transit of Venus that would take place on 8 December. After welcoming on board these renowned leaders of astrophysical research, she got underway on 3 September and, five days later, entered the Hai River. On the 9th, the astronomers went ashore at Tianjin and proceeded overland to Beijing, their observation point for the transit.

After disembarking her passengers, Ashuelot operated in Chinese waters until 10 December 1874 when she set course for Nagasaki. She arrived on the 13th and resumed operations in Japanese waters where she operated until sailing for Shanghai on 19 June 1875. In mid-August, the schooner-rigged steamer set course for Fisherman's Island—near Shantou where she guarded a party of rescue workers who were attempting to recover treasure from the wreck of Japan, a Pacific Mail Steamship Company liner which had caught fire and gone down some 25 miles off Breaker Point on 18 December 1868. Pirates had recently been active in the area, prompting fear that they would attempt to seize any valuables taken from the sunken hulk.

=== 1876–1879 ===
The following spring, the gunboat visited Siam to investigate complaints that arbitrary action by the American consul at Bangkok had prevented the timely shipment to Philadelphia of the Siamese exhibit that had been prepared by order of the young Thai monarch Rama IV for display at the United States Centennial Exposition. She reached Bangkok on 23 April 1876, and Matthews spent more than a fortnight there dividing his time between the exchange of diplomatic courtesies and questioning people—both American and Siamese about the situation. Ashuelot sailed for Cochinchina, on 9 May and reached Saigon four days later. There, Matthews reported that the high-handed American diplomat had been far from diplomatic. He then returned to Bangkok, took the exhibit on board, and carried it via Saigon to Hong Kong where it was transferred to a merchantman which took it on to the United States.

From time to time in the ensuing years, the gunboat returned to Siam, besides visiting the treaty ports of China and Japan. Relations between the latter two countries were then being increasingly strained as Japan became more active in the affairs of islands in the western Pacific—such as Formosa and the Ryūkyūs—which had long paid tribute to the Chinese Emperor. When negotiations between the two nations grew more tense late in the summer of 1877, Ashuelot proceeded to Chefoo where she arrived on 13 August. She remained there into the autumn, ready to be of assistance to American citizens in the vicinity should they be endangered by the outbreak of war or domestic disorder. On 7 October, she got underway from Nagasaki and headed for Tianjin where she arrived on the 10th.

When tension had somewhat relaxed, the gunboat sailed south on 21 November 1877 and, six days later, arrived at Shanghai for repairs. In the spring of 1878, she returned to Nagasaki and operated in Japanese waters until heading back to southern China on 1 November for additional repairs before visiting the Philippines in December 1878 and Siam in January 1879.

=== 1879–1880 ===
The spring of that year brought Ashuelot one of her more interesting assignments. On 30 April, the steamer Irrawaddy—with General Ulysses S. Grant and party on board—entered Hong Kong harbor. After leaving the White House some two years earlier, the former president had begun a cruise around the world; and he wished to visit China and Japan before heading home. Ashuelot dressed ship and manned the yards in honor of her erstwhile Commander in Chief. A short time later, Grant briefly visited the gunboat which had been charged with transporting him while he was in Chinese waters. He returned to her on 5 May and she took him to Canton and Macao. She returned to Hong Kong on the 10th, and he went ashore for two final days at that British crown colony.

The general and his party returned to the ship on the 12th, and she stood out to sea for visits to Shantou and Amoy en route to Shanghai which she reached on the 17th. At the end of a six-day visit there, Grant reembarked in Ashuelot; and she took him to the mouth of the Hai River and then up that estuary to Tianjin where he again left the ship and proceeded by small boats to Beijing for discussions with Prince Gong who ruled the Chinese Empire as regent while the seven-year-old Emperor was growing to adulthood. During their meetings, the Prince explained to Grant China's position on its dispute with Japan over control of the Ryukyu Islands and requested his good offices in regard to the matter during the general's forthcoming visit to Japan. After leaving Beijing, Grant returned to Tianjin where he boarded Ashuelot for passage to the mouth of the river. There, the screw sloop of war awaited to take Grant to Japan.

On 15 June, Ashuelot got underway and proceeded via Yantai to Nagasaki. She operated in Japanese waters until autumn when she returned to China.

By that time the years had taken their toll on the gunboat—so much so that she had come to be known throughout the squadron as "the ironmonger's hope". Nevertheless, since no replacement for her was available, she was retained in the Asiatic Squadron and patched up for further service. She arrived at Shanghai on 10 October 1879 and remained there undergoing extensive repairs through the spring of 1880.

=== 1880–1883 ===
Ashuelot departed Shanghai on 20 June of that year and reached Nagasaki on the 23rd. For the next two and one-half years, she operated along the coast of China, up the Yangtze, and among the treaty ports of Japan. On 17 February 1883, the gunboat departed Amoy and set a course for Shantou. While she was proceeding through heavy fog before dawn the next morning, Ashuelot struck a rock off East Lamock Island and suffered such severe damage that she had to be abandoned. Eleven men perished with the ship.
