= USS Mohongo =

Mohongo-class gunboat

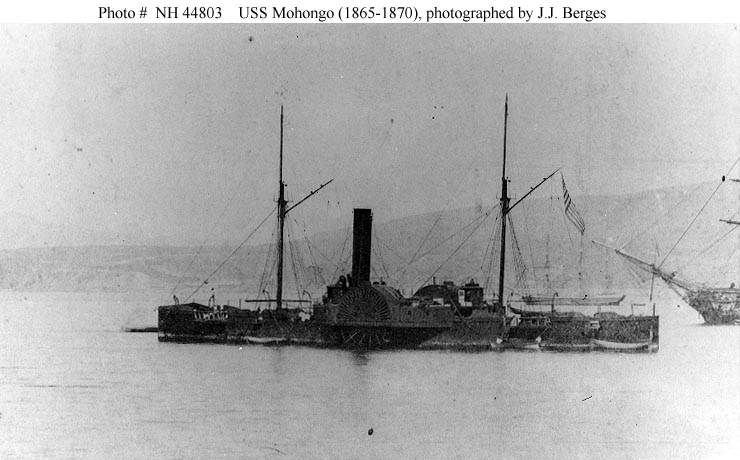

History

United States
- Name: USS Mohongo
- Builder: Zeno Secor & Co., Jersey City, New Jersey
- Laid down: 1863
- Launched: 9 July 1864
- Commissioned: 23 May 1865
- Decommissioned: 29 May 1869
- Fate: Sold, 17 November 1870

General characteristics
- Type: Gunboat
- Displacement: 1,034 long tons (1,051 t)
- Length: 255 ft (78 m)
- Beam: 35 ft (11 m)
- Draft: 9 ft 6 in (2.90 m)
- Speed: 13 knots (24 km/h; 15 mph)
- Complement: 190
- Armament: 2 × 100-pounder Parrott rifles; 4 × 9 in (230 mm) Parrott rifles; 2 × 20-pounder Dahlgren rifles; 2 × 24-pounder guns

USS Mohongo, an iron‑hulled, schooner‑rigged gunboat, was laid down at New York City by Zeno Secor & Co., Jersey City, N.J., in 1863; launched on 9 July 1864; and commissioned at New York Navy Yard on 23 May 1865, Capt. J. W. A. Nicholson in command.

== Service history ==
Assigned to the Pacific Squadron, Mohongo departed Brooklyn on 29 May 1865 for the west coast of South America. Sailing via St. Thomas, Barbados, Natal, Rio de Janeiro, and Montevideo, making official protocol visits to those Caribbean and Latin American ports, the "double‑ender" steamed through the Strait of Magellan in a severe gale on 9 October and arrived at Valparaíso, Chile, on the 29th. She remained there repairing her storm-damaged pumps and boilers until standing out on 27 April 1866 for Callao, Peru. Arriving six days later, the warship joined Rear Adm. George F. Pearson's Pacific Squadron in the midst of a Spanish blockade during the Peruvian War with Spain over conditions of the treaty recognizing Peru's independence. Mohongo remained at Callao with the rest of the squadron, protecting American lives and property from attack by either side until departing on 21 May for a month's cruise up the coast of South America to Guayaquil, Ecuador, on a protocol visit.

The warship arrived at the squadron's Panama base at the end of June and on 6 August was ordered to Rear Adm. Henry K. Thatcher's newly established North Pacific Squadron, originally part of the Pacific Squadron now divided in two because of the great area to be patrolled by American naval vessels. Departing Panama on 20 November, the ship visited Acapulco, Mexico, from 30 November to 28 March 1867 and then sailed to Mare Island Navy Yard for a year‑long overhaul, completed 15 August 1868.

Mohongo stood out of San Francisco on 26 April bound for Honolulu on an official diplomatic cruise to Hawaii. During the seven‑month visit, she received on board King Kamehameha V and Dowager Queen Emma, the American Chargé d'affaires Colonel Spaulding, U.S. Minister Edward M. McCook, and other Island officials and court members in July and August, and then cruised the Hawaiian chain, making charts and patrolling into December. The gunboat departed Hawaii on 17 December for La Paz, Lower California, on a protocol visit, receiving the Governor on board on the 24th, and then cruised off Lower Mexico for the rest of the year and into 1869, putting into San Francisco on 4 March. Eight days later she sailed again to cruise the same station off the Mexican and Lower Californian coasts. On 19 May, she returned to San Francisco. After off‑loading ordnance and stores at Mare Island, her crew was transferred to sloop of war Mohican, and Mohongo was decommissioned on 29 May 1869. The gunboat was sold to H. Norton on 17 November 1870.
