= USS Miantonomah (ACM-13) =

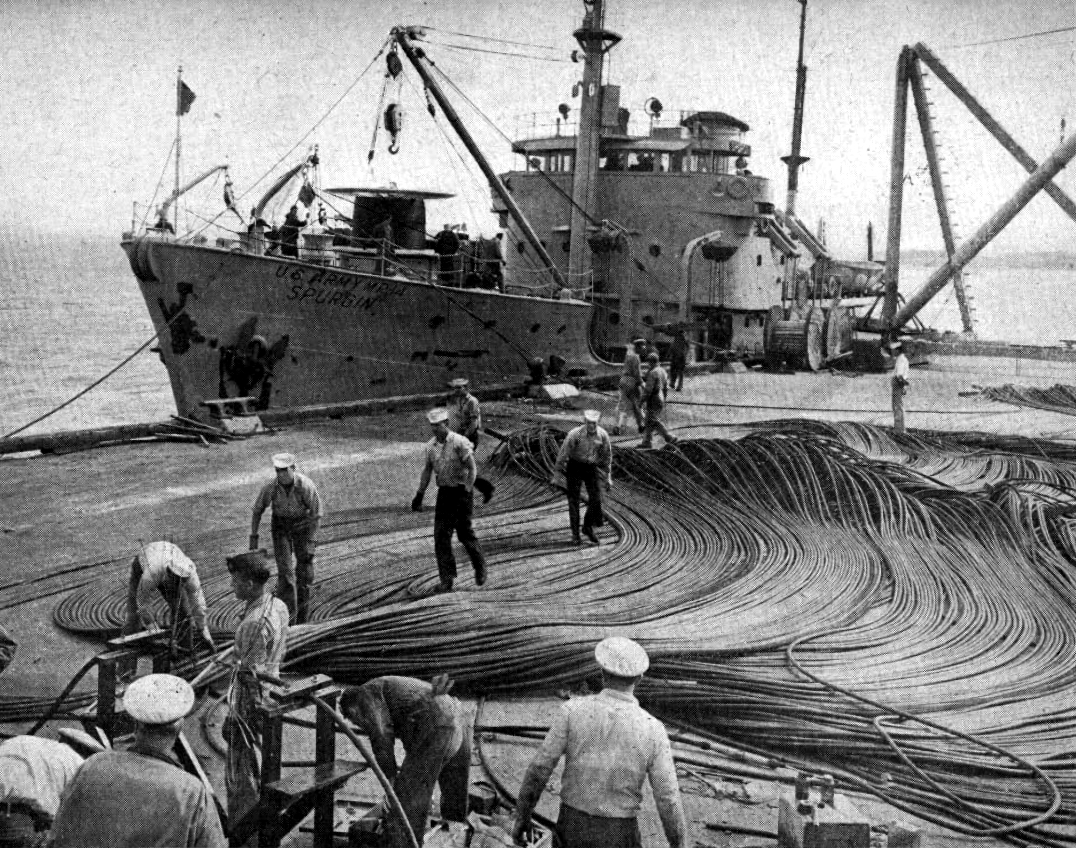
- Seen here as USAMP Col. Horace F. Spurgin (MP 14) US Navy photo from the March 1950 edition of All Hands magazine.

History

United States
- Name: USAMP Col. Horace F. Spurgin MP-14
- Namesake: Col. Horace Fletcher Spurgin, US Army Coast Artillery Corps
- Ordered: 1942
- Builder: Marietta Manufacturing Co., Point Pleasant, West Virginia, hull #487.
- Launched: 1943
- Sponsored by: Mrs. Barbee Rothgeb
- Notes: One of sixteen M1 Mine Planters ordered by US Army Coast Artillery Corps 1942–1943

United States
- Name: USS ACM-13
- Namesake: "A variant spelling of Miantonomoh (q.v.). The name was most likely assigned to commemorate the service of the previous ship of the name."
- Launched: 24 December 1942
- Acquired: by the US Navy, as ACM-13, 25 January 1950
- Commissioned: 25 January 1950
- Decommissioned: 19 July 1955 at Terminal Island, Long Beach, California
- Renamed: Miantonomah, 1 May 1955
- Reclassified: MMA-13, 7 February 1955
- Stricken: 1 July 1960
- Identification: IMO number: 7307392
- Fate: Incorporated into breakwater at Tyee Marina in Tacoma, Washington on 12 August 2009 after service as fishing vessel, later scrapped circa 2021 by Ballard Marine Construction, Inc., of Washougal, WA.

General characteristics
- Type: Auxiliary minelayer
- Displacement: 910 long tons (925 t) light
- Length: 189 ft (58 m)
- Beam: 37 ft (11 m)
- Draft: 12 ft (3.7 m)
- Speed: 12 knots (22 km/h; 14 mph)
- Complement: 135

USS Miantonomah (ACM-13/MMA-13) was built as the US Army Mine Planter USAMP Col. Horace F. Spurgin (MP-14) for the U.S. Army by Marietta Manufacturing Co., Point Pleasant, West Virginia, in 1943. Col. Horace F. Spurgin was christened by Mrs. Barbee Rothgeb. Col. Horace F. Spurgin was transferred from the US Army to the US Navy and commissioned as ACM-13 on 25 January 1950. After decommissioning and sale to commercial interests 17 February 1961, the ship remained in the fishing fleet into the 1990s before becoming part of a breakwater in Tacoma, Washington. Photos of the ship being dismantled for scrap by Ballard Marine Construction, Inc., of Washougal, WA, were added to NavSource in 2021, but the exact timeframe of her sale & scrapping is not clear.

== Army Service ==
USAMP Col. Horace F. Spurgin MP-14 is known to have served in Sausalito, California at Fort Baker's Submarine Mine Depot supporting the San Francisco Bay Coast Artillery defenses with the USAMP Gen. Samuel M. Mills. The ship became the prototype for correction of a deficiency in engine order telegraphs to extend them to bridge wings. One commercial system was installed on USAMP Col. Alfred A. Maybach while a second, fabricated and installed by Chief Engineer CWO John B. May, aboard Col. Horace F. Spurgin became the recommended correction for all M1 type Mine Planters.

== Navy Service ==
Commissioned as ACM-13 at Treasure Island on 25 January 1950 under the command of Lt. Harold G. Gibson. Assigned to the 12th Naval District, based at US Naval Station, Treasure Island, California, the unnamed auxiliary minelayer operated out of San Francisco Bay along the California coast training for harbor defense. In addition she towed sea targets and supported fleet gunnery exercises.

The ship was involved with the transition of harbor defense responsibilities from Army to Navy as shown in photographs in the March 1950 issue of All Hands magazine. The Fort Baker Submarine Mine Depot was in close proximity to the Naval School, Harbor Defense, Fort Winfield Scott, San Francisco, California in which Naval Reserve personnel were trained for duties previously performed by Army Coast Artillery Corps personnel. Both services would man the Harbor Entrance Control Post (HECP).

On 7 February 1955 she reclassified to MMA-13, and on 1 May she was named Miantonomah. The newly renamed ship reported to the Long Beach Group, Pacific Reserve Fleet, to begin inactivation on 14 May. Miantonomah decommissioned at Terminal Island, Long Beach, California, 19 July 1955. She entered the Pacific Reserve Fleet at Long Beach. Her name was struck from the Navy List 1 July 1960 and she was sold to Hubert P. Sturdivant and Edward Madruga of San Diego, 17 February 1961. She was delivered to her purchaser on 28 February.

== Commercial Service ==
Became tuna fishing vessel Nautilus owned by Edward Madruga and Manuel Cintas. Sold and operated as Aleutian Mist and New Star in northern waters. New Star became part of the breakwater at Tyee Marina in Tacoma, Washington on 12 August 2009.
