= USS Camanche (1864) =

200 foot ironclad warship, sold 1899

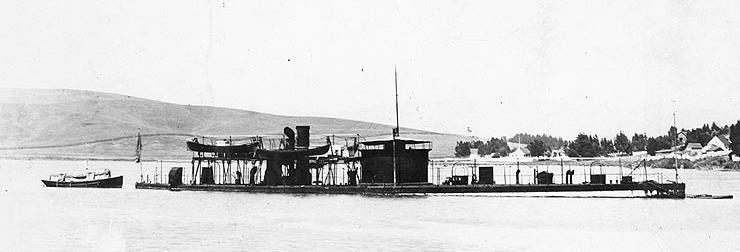
- USS Camanche off Mare Island, during the Spanish–American War

History

United States
- Name: USS Camache
- Builder: Donohue, Ryan & Secor
- Launched: November 14, 1864
- Commissioned: May 1865
- Decommissioned: 1898
- Fate: Sold, March 22, 1899

General characteristics
- Class & type: Passaic-class ironclad monitor
- Displacement: 1,335 long tons (1,356 t)
- Length: 200 ft (61 m) overall
- Beam: 46 ft (14 m)
- Draft: 11 ft 6 in (3.51 m)
- Installed power: 320 ihp (240 kW)
- Propulsion: 1 × Ericsson vibrating lever engine; 2 × Martin boilers; 1 × shaft
- Speed: 7 kn (8.1 mph; 13 km/h)
- Complement: 76
- Armament: 2 × 15 in (380 mm) Dahlgren guns
- Armor: Side: 3–5 in (7.6–12.7 cm); Turret: 11 in (28 cm); Pilothouse: 8 in (20 cm); Deck: 1 in (2.5 cm)
- Notes: Armor is iron.

USS Camanche was a Passaic-class monitor that was prefabricated at Jersey City, New Jersey by Donahue, Ryan and Secor for the sum of $613,164.98 ($9.68 million in present day terms). She was disassembled and shipped around Cape Horn in the sailing ship Aquila to San Francisco, California. Aquila arrived in San Francisco on 10 November 1863 but sank at her wharf in 30 feet of water on 14 November 1863 as a result of storm damage and a collision with another ship. The monitor's parts were salvaged and she was launched on 14 November 1864. Camanche was commissioned in May 1865, Lieutenant Commander Charles J. McDougal in command.

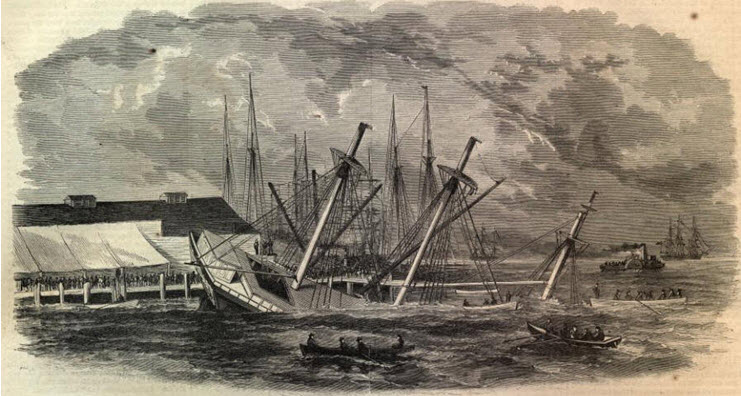
The wreck of Aquila, sunk in a storm with the disassembled Camanche aboard at San Francisco, California, on 15 November 1863 (Illustration from Harper's Weekly, 16 January 1864).

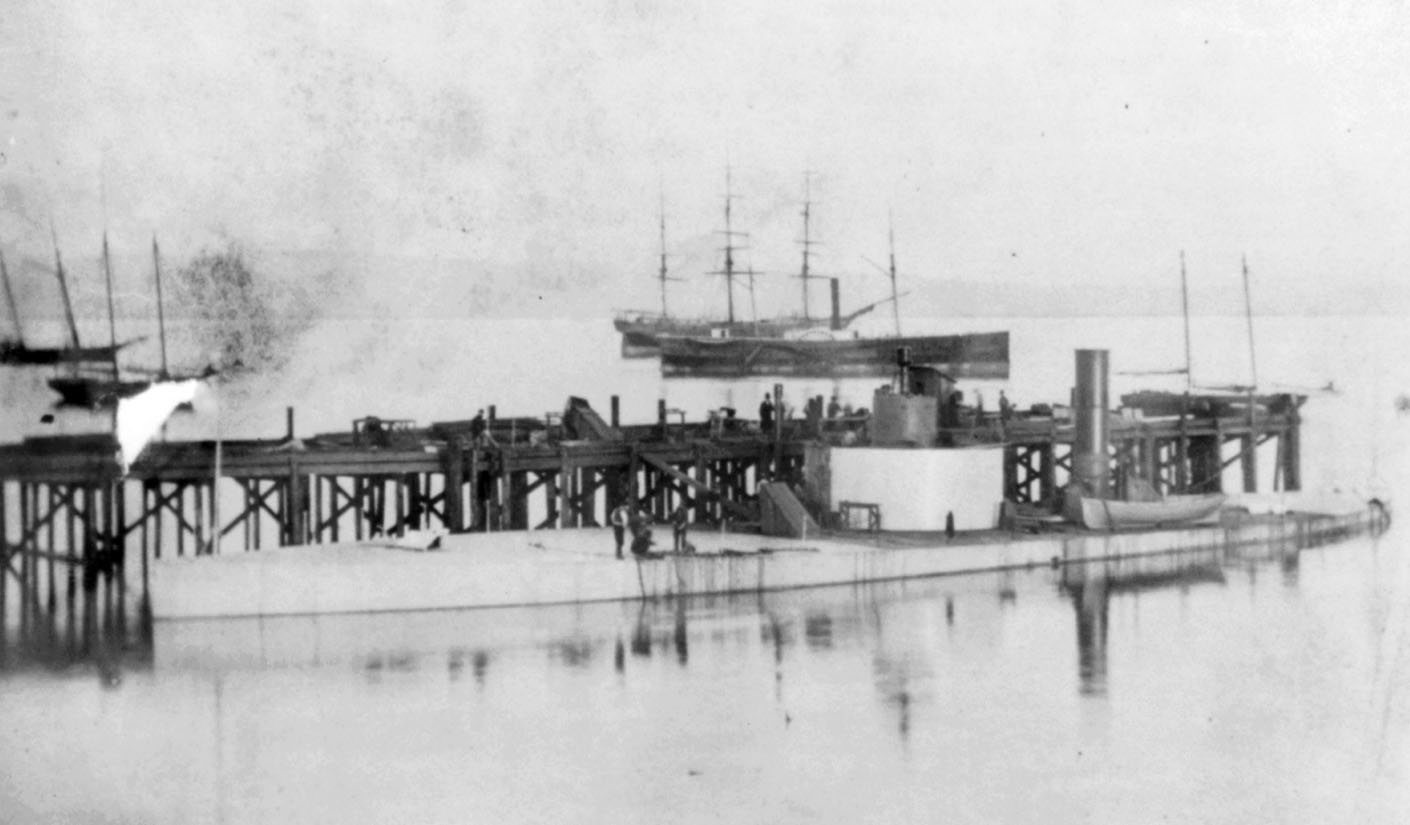
USS Camanche c. 1866.

Commissioned just after the end of the Civil War, for more than a year—until the arrival of the larger monitor Monadnock—Camanche was the only U.S. ironclad on the Pacific coast, and she was one of but two stationed there for nearly 25 years.

Camanche's career was a quiet one, with the ship generally maintained in decommissioned status at the Mare Island Navy Yard, in northern San Francisco Bay. She was the California Naval Militia's training ship in 1896–97 and appears to have been reactivated for a few months in 1898, during the Spanish–American War, for coastal defense purposes.

Camanche was sold on 22 March 1899 for the sum of 6,581.25 dollars. According to page 10 of the San Francisco Call dated November 20, 1899, Camanche had her machinery, her weapons and her armor removed by the Union Iron Works in Oakland and she was converted into a collier, hauling coal. Her first voyage as a collier occurred on November 19, 1899. Photographic evidence and local records indicate she remained in the San Francisco area hauling coal for almost 40 years after that. On March 5, 1937, a California newspaper the "Sausalito News" reported on the old monitors fate: "....So the old craft lay at her old home until a local coal concern bought her for a song, and converted her into a coal barge. She did duty until oil and gas took the place of coal and is now lying at the east end of the Bethlehem shipyard, a useless forgotten hulk. Her contract price was $400,000.00".

== Bibliography ==
- Wright, Christopher C. (June 2021). "Canonicus at Jamestown, 1907". Warship International. LVIII (2): 126–162. ISSN 0043-0374.
- Additional technical data from Gardiner, Robert (1979). Conway's All the World's Fighting Ships 1860–1905. Conway Maritime Press. p. 120. ISBN 0-85177-133-5.
