= Suamico-class oiler =

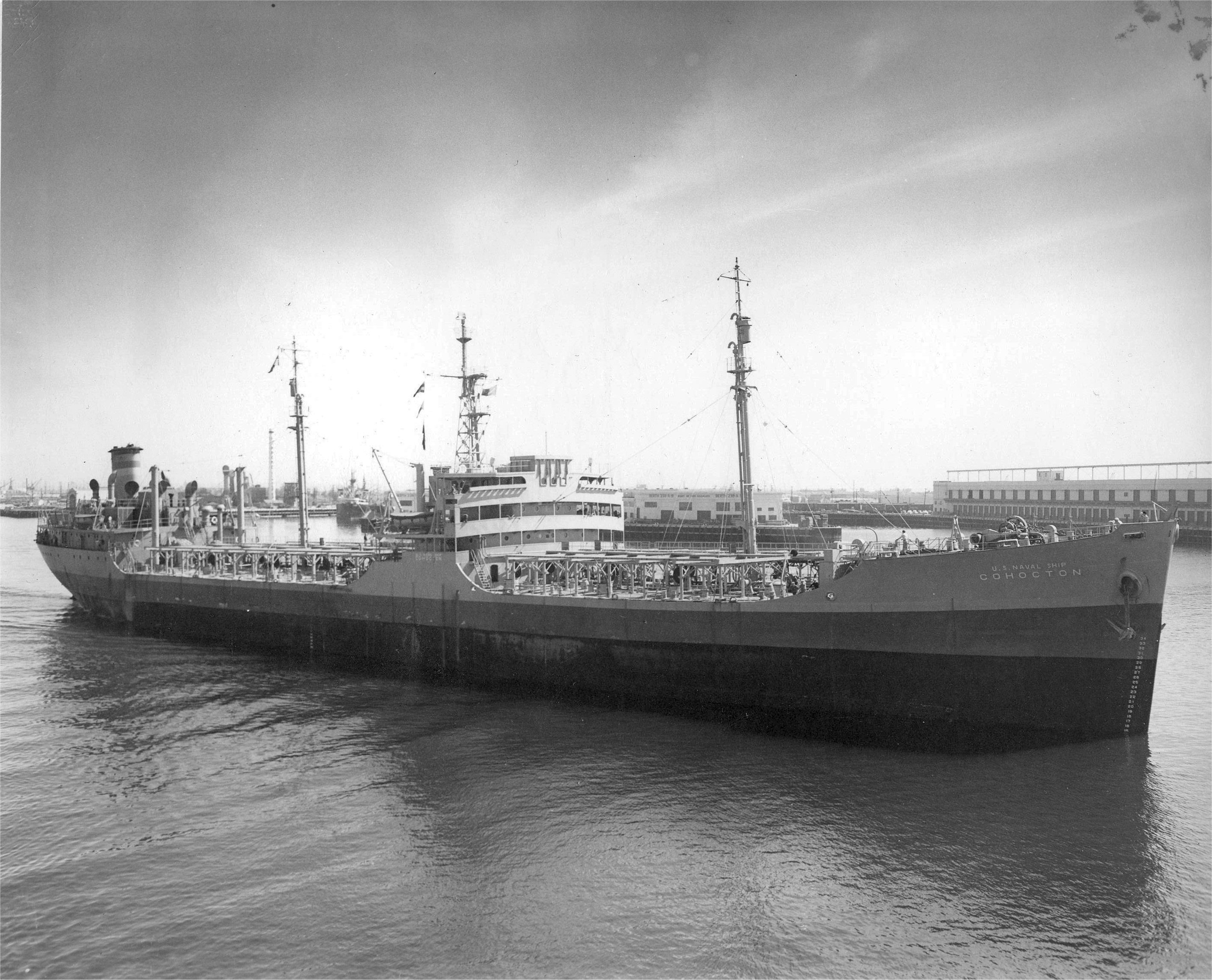
- USS Cohocton

Class overview
- Name: Suamico class
- Builders: Sun Shipbuilding & Drydock, Chester, Pennsylvania; Marinship, Sausalito, California
- Operators: United States Navy
- Preceded by: Kennebec class
- Succeeded by: Neosho class
- Subclasses: Escambia class; Cohocton class
- Built: 1940–1945
- In service: 1942–1972
- Planned: 30
- Completed: 25 + 2 converted
- Canceled: 3

General characteristics
- Type: T2-SE-A1/2/3 tanker
- Displacement: 5,782 long tons (5,875 t) light; 21,880 long tons (22,231 t) full
- Length: 523 ft 6 in (159.56 m)
- Beam: 68 ft (21 m)
- Draft: 30 ft 10 in (9.40 m)
- Propulsion: Turbo-electric transmission, single screw, 6,000 shp (4,474 kW) (Suamicos); 10,000 shp (7,457 kW) (Escambias)
- Speed: 14 knots (26 km/h; 16 mph) (Suamicos); 15 knots (28 km/h; 17 mph) (Escambias)
- Capacity: 140,000 barrels (22,000 m^{3})
- Complement: 267 officers and enlisted
- Armament: 1 × 5-inch/38-caliber dual purpose gun; 4 × 3-inch/50-caliber guns; 4 × twin 40 mm guns; 4 × twin 20 mm guns

The Suamico class were a class of 25 United States Navy oilers during World War II. Built to the Maritime Commission T2-SE-A1 (Suamico class), -A2 (Escambia class) and -A3 (Cohocton) designs, they used turbo-electric transmission, obviating the need for reduction gearing which was a major issue in US mass-production shipbuilding.

== Construction ==
=== The Suamicos ===
Just before the war the United States Maritime Commission had developed a standardized tanker design, the T2, which could be mass-produced in time of war, and militarized as needed for naval auxiliaries. The T2 was given sufficient engine power to attain 16.5 knots (30.6 km/h), which the Navy considered the minimum required for a fleet oiler.

The T2 and its variants (see Kennebec-class oiler) however used conventional geared steam turbine propulsion, and with the massive expansion of US shipbuilding, a production bottleneck developed: the limited availability of the precision machinery needed to manufacture reduction gearing. The Sun Shipbuilding and Drydock Company of Chester, Pennsylvania worked around this problem by designing a T2 variant which used turbo-electric propulsion; that is, the steam turbine ran a generator, which in turn powered electric drive motors without the need for gearing. Compared to conventional geared turbines turbo-electric systems produced less power for the same size and weight, so Sun's T2-SE (steam-electric)-A1 design could only develop 6,000 shaft horsepower for 14 knots, but since commercial tankers typically only did 12–13 knots this was acceptable. Acknowledging the practicality of the design for merchant service, the Maritime Commission ordered 72 T2-SE-A1s from four shipyards in May 1941. Ultimately 536 T2-SEs would be built, the most-produced tanker design in history.

On 9 June 1942, Admiral Nimitz indicated an immediate need for four more fleet oilers. The War Shipping Board requisitioned the last remaining T2 and T2-A tankers still in commercial service, Catawba and Aekay, and, with reservations given their limited speed, two nearly-complete Sun T2-SE-A1s, Harlem Heights and Valley Forge. These were commissioned as USS Suamico (AO-49) and Tallulah (AO-50). In August, with the fourteen repeats of the big 18-knot (33 km/h) Cimarron class still a year from completion, the Navy took over the next two T2-SEs off Sun's ways, Oriskany and Stillwater, renamed Pecos (AO-65) and Cache (AO-67). On 7 August the Auxiliary Vessels Board recommended that the Navy add two oilers per month for a period of six months. While fifteen of the 15.3-knot T3-S-A1 type had been ordered by the Maritime Commission, only five (the Chiwawa class) would be completed in time, and so the Navy filled out the requirement with another seven T2-SE-A1s, AO-73 through 79, the first of which were acquired on the last day of 1942.

=== The Escambias ===
During the spring and summer of 1942, a period German U-boat captains called "the happy time," tankers were being sunk in the Atlantic faster than they could be built. In response, on 27 July the Maritime Commission decided that the new Marinship yard at Sausalito, California, created to produce Liberty ships, would construct T2-SE tankers instead, with an initial order of 22. However, there simply were not enough of the specified generator plants available. On the other hand, General Electric indicated its ability to provide the larger 10,000 hp (7,500 kW) turbo-electric plants designed for the P2-SE2-R1 Admiral-class fast transports, and Marinship's naval architects modified the original Sun design to make room for the larger installation. The Marin T2-SE-A2's engineering spaces were cramped, but it all fit; better yet, the new design was capable of speeds in excess of 15 knots (28 km/h). By the end of the year the Navy, unenthusiastic about the slower Suamicos, was eager to acquire the more powerful new version and requisitioned the first nine, which were launched starting in April 1943 and after conversion as fleet oilers started commissioning in October, as AO-80, USS Escambia, through AO-88.

The Maritime Commission followed its initial order of 22 T2-SE-A2s with another for 18 more; the Navy would acquire six of these as AO-91 through 96. By the time these started entering service in late 1944 the Navy was finding that fresh water was becoming more of a problem in the Pacific than fuel; accordingly Pasig and Abatan were converted to water-distilling ships (AW-3 and 4), and Soubarissen into a water tanker.

=== The A3s ===
On 16 October 1944 the Chief of Naval Operations recommended that the Maritime Commission building program for the last half of 1945 be modified to provide for the construction of nine additional oilers for the Navy. On 2 November 1944 the MC added to its program the construction of four ships at Marinship to the 10,000-horsepower T2-SE-A3 design together with five T3s at Bethlehem Steel. The T2-SE-A3 type was essentially an A2 built to Navy standards from the start rather than being modified later (converting a civilian tanker to a Navy fleet oiler represented an additional 4–6 months' work after delivery). The last three ships were completed without these features, after the Navy canceled them in the waning days of the war.

== Postwar service ==
All of the oilers of the class were decommissioned to reserve in 1946; however all were reactivated for tanker duties with civilian crews by the Naval Transport Service and its successor the Military Sea Transportation Service in 1947–1950, except for Saranac, which had been converted to a floating electric power plant to supply the naval base at Guam, and Ponaganset, which broke in half and sank during her pre-reactivation overhaul. The Escambias were retired to the National Defense Reserve Fleet by the end of the 1950s, while the somewhat more economical Suamicos soldiered on through the Vietnam War; Cowanesque struck a reef and foundered off Okinawa in 1972. Because of their 7.5 megawatt generating capacity, six of the Escambias were transferred to the United States Army and converted to floating power plants in 1965–66, serving in that role in Vietnam. When Saugatuck went to the breakers in 2006 she was the last survivor of the Navy's Type T2 oilers.

== Ships of the class ==
| Name | Original name | Commissioned | USNS service | Fate |
T2-SE-A1 (Sun Shipbuilding & Drydock, Chester, Pennsylvania)
| USS Suamico (AO-49) | Harlem Heights | 10 Aug 42 | 1948–1974 | Struck 1974; scrapped 1975 |
| USS Tallulah (AO-50) | Valley Forge | 5 Sept 42 | 1949–1975 | Struck 1986, scrapped 1987 |
| USS Pecos (AO-65) | Oriskany | 5 Oct 42 | 1950–1974 | Struck 1974; scrapped 1975 |
| USS Cache (AO-67) | Stillwater | 3 Nov 42 | 1948–1973 | Struck 1986, scrapped 1987 |
| USS Millicoma (AO-73) | Kings Mountain | 5 Mar 43 | 1949–1976 | Struck and scrapped 1987 |
| USS Saranac (AO-74) | Cowpens | 22 Feb 43 | - | To floating power plant 1946, reclassified YFP-9 1954. Struck 1956, sold 1957 (Somerset) |
| USS Saugatuck (AO-75) | Newtown | 19 Feb 43 | 1948–1974 | Struck and scrapped 2006 |
| USS Schuylkill (AO-76) | Louisburg | 9 Apr 43 | 1949–1976 | Struck 1986, scrapped 1988 |
| USS Cossatot (AO-77) | Fort Necessity | 20 Apr 43 | 1949–1974 | Struck 1974, scrapped 1975 |
| USS Chepachet (AO-78) | Eutaw Springs | 27 Apr 43 | 1949–1972 | Struck 1980 |
| USS Cowanesque (AO-79) | Fort Duquesne | 1 May 43 | 1950–1972 | Sank off Okinawa 1972 |
T2-SE-A2 (Bechtel Marinship, Sausalito, California)
| USS Escambia (AO-80) | | 28 Oct 43 | 1950–1957 | To Army as floating power plant 1966, scrapped 1971 |
| USS Kennebago (AO-81) | | 4 Dec 43 | 1950–1959 | To Army as floating power plant 1965, sold to RVN 1974 |
| USS Cahaba (AO-82) | Lackawapen | 14 Jan 44 | 1950–1958 | To Army as floating power plant 1966, scrapped 1971 |
| USS Mascoma (AO-83) | | 3 Feb 44 | 1950–1959 | Struck and sold 1959 (Seatrain Oregon, Transchamplain), scrapped 1980 |
| USS Ocklawaha (AO-84) | | 9 Mar 44 | 1949–1959 | Struck 1959, scrapped 1975 |
| USS Pamanset (AO-85) | | 30 Apr 44 | 1949–1957 | Struck and sold 1957 (Seatrain Florida), to NDRF 1975, scrapped 1986 |
| USS Ponaganset (AO-86) | | 15 May 44 | - | Sank dockside at Boston 1947, wreck scrapped 1949 |
| USS Sebec (AO-87) | | 29 Mar 44 | 1950–1957 | To Army as floating power plant 1966, scrapped 1974 |
| USS Tomahawk (AO-88) | | 16 Apr 44 | 1947–1960 | Sold 1966 (Seatrain Maine), to NDRF 1973, scrapped 2008 |
| USS Pasig (AO-91) | Mission San Xavier | 28 Aug 44 as AW-3 | - | Decommissioned 1955, struck 1960, scrapped 1975 |
| USS Abatan (AO-92) | Mission San Lorenzo | 29 Jan 45 as AW-4 | - | Decommissioned 1947, struck 1970, SINKEX 1980 |
| USS Soubarissen (AO-93) | Mission Santa Ana | 5 Jan 45 | 1948–1958 | Struck 1961, scrapped 1982 |
| USS Anacostia (AO-94) | Mission Alamo | 25 Feb 45 | 1948–1957 | Struck 1957, sold 1967 (Penn Ranger, Omnium Ranger), scrapped 1978 |
| USS Caney (AO-95) | Mission Los Angeles | 25 Mar 45 | 1950–1959 | To Army as floating power plant 1966, sold to RVN 1974 |
| USS Tamalpais (AO-96) | Mission San Francisco | 20 May 45 | 1948–1957 | To Army as floating power plant 1966, sold to RVN 1974 |
T2-SE-A3 (Bechtel Marinship, Sausalito, California)
| USS Cohocton (AO-101) | | 25 Aug 45 | 1949–1958 | Sold 1967 (Transoneida), scrapped 1980 |
| USS Concho (AO-102) | | | 1948–1958 | Completed as USNS Mission Santa Ana (T-AO-137) Oct 1945, struck 1958 |
| USS Conecuh (AO-103) | | | 1947–1957 | Completed as USNS Mission Los Angeles (T-AO-117) Oct 1945, struck 1957 |
| USS Contoocook (AO-104) | | | 1947–1957 | Completed as USNS Mission San Francisco (T-AO-123) Oct 1945, sank at New Castle DE 1957 |

== See also ==
- United States Navy oiler
