= USS Escambia =

Oiler of the United States Navy

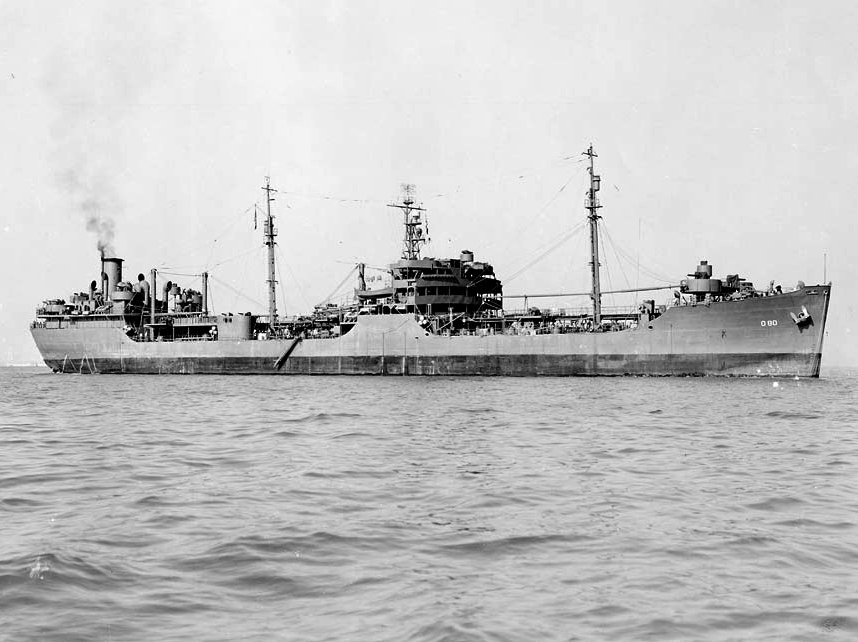
- USS Escambia (AO-80) in late 1943

History

United States
- Name: USS Escambia
- Namesake: Escambia River in Georgia and Florida
- Builder: Marinship, Sausalito, California
- Laid down: December 1942
- Launched: 24 April 1943
- Commissioned: 28 October 1943
- Decommissioned: 20 February 1946
- Stricken: (date unknown)
- Acquired: 26 January 1948
- In service: 18 July 1950, as USNS Escambia (T-AO-80)
- Stricken: 1957
- Honors and awards: 5 battle stars (World War II)
- Fate: Acquired by the US Army, May 1966; Scrapped by the government of South Vietnam in August 1971

General characteristics
- Class & type: Escambia-class replenishment oiler
- Displacement: 5,782 long tons (5,875 t) light; 21,880 long tons (22,231 t) full
- Length: 523 ft 6 in (159.56 m)
- Beam: 68 ft (21 m)
- Draft: 30 ft 10 in (9.40 m)
- Propulsion: Turbo-electric, single screw, 8,000 shp (5,966 kW)
- Speed: 15 knots (28 km/h; 17 mph)
- Capacity: 140,000 barrels (22,000 m^{3})
- Complement: 267 officers and enlisted
- Armament: 1 × 5"/38 caliber dual purpose gun; 4 × 3"/50 caliber guns; 4 × twin 40 mm guns; 4 × twin 20 mm guns

USS Escambia (AO-80) was the lead ship of her subclass of the Suamico class of fleet oilers acquired by the United States Navy for use during World War II. She had the dangerous, but necessary task of providing fuel to vessels in combat and non-combat areas primarily in the Pacific Ocean. For her valiant efforts, she received five battle stars during the war.

Escambia, a type T2-SE-A2 hull, was launched on 25 April 1943 by Marinship Corp., Sausalito, California, sponsored by Mrs. Joseph Cooper, and commissioned on 28 October 1943.

== World War II Pacific Theatre operations ==
After a December 1943 voyage from the U.S. West Coast to Pearl Harbor with oil cargo, Escambia departed San Francisco, California, on 21 January 1944 for Majuro, arriving on 9 February. For the next month she fueled ships at Roi Namur and Majuro as the Marshall Islands were assaulted. From 15 March to 30 August, she sailed out of Espiritu Santo, fueling the fast carrier task force in their raids on the Palaus and during the Hollandia operation.

== Supporting the invasion of the Philippines ==
Escambia arrived at Manus on 14 September 1944, and sailed out of this port to rendezvous at sea to fuel the carriers as they launched the air strikes preliminary to the assault on the Philippines. She sailed on to Ulithi on 25 October, and at this vast fleet anchorage, fueled the carrier task forces as they continued their operations in the Philippines. After a voyage to Eniwetok to reload oil, she sailed from Ulithi on 11 December for a west coast overhaul.

The oiler returned to Ulithi on 18 April 1945, and for the remainder of the war used this as her base as she fueled the carrier task forces supporting the Okinawa invasion, and raiding and bombarding the Japanese home islands. Escambia paid calls to Okinawa and Wakayama Wan to fuel ships at anchor there until leaving Tokyo astern, homeward bound, on 4 November 1945.

She was decommissioned on 20 February 1946, struck from the Navy List, and transferred to the Maritime Commission for disposal in June.

== Transferred to the MSTS ==
Reacquired by the Navy on 26 January 1948, she performed no further commissioned service, but was transferred to the Military Sea Transportation Service on 18 July 1950 to serve as USNS Escambia (T-AO-80) with a civilian crew. Placed out of service (date unknown), she was struck from the Navy List for a second time in 1957.

== Transferred to the U.S. Army ==
She was acquired by the United States Army in May 1966 and converted to a Mobile Army Emergency Power Plant assigned to Vietnam service.

== Final decommissioning ==
She was transferred to the Vietnam Government and scrapped by them in August 1971.

== Awards ==
Escambia received five battle stars for World War II service.
