= SS Mission San Francisco =

SS Mission San Francisco may refer to one of two Type T2 tankers built for the United States Maritime Commission by Marinship Corporation:

- SS Mission San Francisco (1944) (MC hull number 1831, Type T2-SE-A2), acquired by the United States Navy and converted to Escambia-class oiler USS Tamalpais (AO-96); placed in National Defense Reserve Fleet in 1957; converted to floating power plant in 1966 for United States Army use during Vietnam War
- SS Mission San Francisco (1945) (Type T2-SE-A3), ordered and laid down as USS Contoocook (AO-104), but acquisition canceled in August 1945; delivered in October 1945; acquired by the U.S. Navy as Mission Buenaventura-class oiler USS Mission San Francisco (AO-123) in 1947; scrapped in 1958 after 1957 collision in Delaware River
