= SS Mission Los Angeles =

SS Mission Los Angeles may refer to one of two Type T2 tankers built for the United States Maritime Commission by Marinship Corporation:

- SS Mission Los Angeles (1944) (MC hull number 1830, Type T2-SE-A2), acquired by the United States Navy and converted to Escambia-class oiler USS Caney (AO-95); converted to water tanker in 1944; placed in National Defense Reserve Fleet in 1959; converted to floating power plant in 1966 for United States Army use during Vietnam War
- SS Mission Los Angeles (1945) (Type T2-SE-A3), ordered and laid down as USS Conecuh (AO-103), but acquisition canceled in August 1945; delivered in October 1945; acquired by the U.S. Navy as Mission Buenaventura-class oiler USS Mission Los Angeles (AO-117) in 1948; placed in National Defense Reserve Fleet in 1957
