= SS Mission Santa Ana =

SS Mission Santa Ana may refer to one of two Type T2 tankers built for the United States Maritime Commission by Marinship Corporation:

- SS Mission Santa Ana (1944) (MC hull number 1828, Type T2-SE-A2), acquired by the United States Navy and converted to Suamico-class oiler USS Soubarissen (AO-93); converted to water tanker in 1944; placed in National Defense Reserve Fleet in 1955
- SS Mission Santa Ana (1945) (Type T2-SE-A3), ordered and laid down as USS Concho (AO-102), but acquisition canceled in August 1945; delivered in October 1945; acquired by the U.S. Navy as Mission Buenaventura-class oiler USS Mission Santa Ana (AO-137) in 1948; placed in National Defense Reserve Fleet in 1958
