= USS Kennebago =

Oiler of the United States Navy

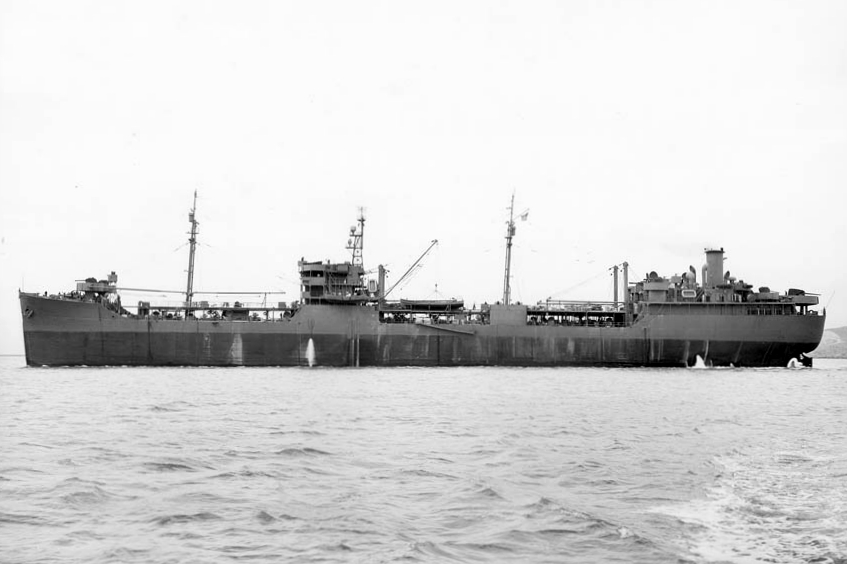
- USS Kennebago

History

United States
- Name: USS Kennebago
- Namesake: Kennebago River in Maine
- Laid down: 9 January 1943
- Launched: 9 May 1943
- Acquired: 30 July 1943
- Commissioned: 4 December 1943
- Decommissioned: 19 July 1946
- Acquired: 1 October 1949
- In service: September 1950, as USNS Kennebago (T-AO-80)
- Out of service: 27 November 1957
- In service: 23 May 1958
- Out of service: 22 May 1959
- Stricken: (date unknown)
- Honors and awards: 6 battle stars (World War II)
- Fate: Acquired by the US Army, 20 May 1966; Scrapped, 1971

General characteristics
- Type: Escambia-class replenishment oiler
- Displacement: 5,782 long tons (5,875 t) light; 21,880 long tons (22,231 t) full
- Length: 523 ft 6 in (159.56 m)
- Beam: 68 ft (21 m)
- Draft: 30 ft 10 in (9.40 m)
- Propulsion: Turbo-electric, single screw, 8,000 shp (5,966 kW)
- Speed: 13 knots (24 km/h; 15 mph) (econ.); 15.5 knots (28.7 km/h; 17.8 mph) (max.)
- Capacity: 140,000 barrels (22,000 m^{3})
- Complement: 267 to 300
- Armament: 1 × 5"/38 caliber dual purpose gun; 4 × 3"/50 caliber guns; 4 × twin 40 mm guns; 4 × twin 20 mm guns

USS Kennebago (AO-81) was an Escambia-class replenishment oiler serving in the United States Navy during World War II. Laid down on 9 January 1943, she was named for the Kennebago River located in Rangeley, Maine.

Kennebago, a type T2-SE-A2 tanker hull, was built at Marinship, Sausalito, California, and launched on 9 May 1943, sponsored by Mrs. W. E. Waste, the ship was commissioned by the US Navy on 4 December 1943.

== Service history ==
=== United States Navy, 1943–1946 ===
After an initial shakedown cruise off the west coast, Kennebago departed San Diego on 24 January 1944 for various bases in the Aleutians carrying fuel oil and aviation gasoline. She returned to San Diego on 28 February, loaded with fuel, and departed for the Marshall Islands. She arrived on 15 April and continued to make fueling runs from Pearl Harbor to the Marshalls.

After the United States invasion of the Marianas, Kennebago departed the Marshalls on 19 June, and arrived in Saipan on 22 June to refuel ships of the 5th Fleet. After continuing refueling operations in the area, she departed Manus on 9 October to rendezvous with Vice Admiral Mitscher's Fast Carrier Task Force, Task Force 38, conducting operations in the Philippine Sea. After refueling ships until 23 October, she departed for Ulithi, continuing to refuel ships east of the Philippines until 25 December. Next, she would support the landing operations in Lingayen Gulf, fueling ships that were operating as part of the task force. She continued on refueling operations in the theater until 6 April 1945, when she would sail for Los Angeles, California, arriving there 24 April.

After a brief overhaul, Kennebago was again ready for operations in the Western Pacific, departing on 12 June, after brief stops in San Francisco, California, and Pearl Harbor. After arriving back at Ulithi on 4 July, she continued refueling ships operating in Japanese waters off Honshu.

After the Japanese surrender, she operated out of Okinawa until 9 October, when she would steam to Taku, China to support the United States 7th Fleet in support of the Nationalist Chinese troops fighting the Communist Chinese for control of China. After returning to Pearl Harbor on 28 December, she returned to Hong Kong on 26 January 1946 and sailed for San Francisco on 17 February. Once returning stateside, Kennebago sailed for Boston, Massachusetts on 28 March, arriving 19 April.

=== Military Sea Transportation Service, 1949–1959 ===
After over a year, Kennebago was transferred to the United States Maritime Commission on 27 May 1947 as part of the National Defense Reserve Fleet. She was reacquired by the United States Navy on 1 October 1949 and was placed in service with the Military Sea Transportation Service as USNS Kennebago (T-AO-81) in September 1950. After serving in the Korean War and supporting the American naval power during the early Cold War, she was released to the Maritime Administration on 27 November 1957 in Beaumont, Texas. Again, she was reacquired by the Navy on 23 May 1958 for logistical supply in the Pacific. During 1959, she served the 6th Fleet operating in the Mediterranean Sea. After returning to New York City on 22 May 1959 she was transferred to the National Defense Reserve Fleet again in the James River, Virginia on 23 June 1959.

=== United States Army, 1966–1971 ===
On 20 May 1966, Kennebago served her final mission for the United States Army in Vietnam. Together with Tamalpais (AO-96), the ship served as a floating power station anchored near Nha Trang, Vietnam, until at least May 1971.

== Awards, Citations, Campaign Ribbons ==
USS Kennebago earned seven different awards throughout the course of her career. She has earned the China Service Medal, the American Campaign Medal, six Asiatic–Pacific Campaign Medals, the World War II Victory Medal, the Navy Occupation Service Medal (with Asia clasp), the National Defense Service Medal, and the Philippine Liberation Medal.
