= USS Cahaba =

Oiler of the United States Navy

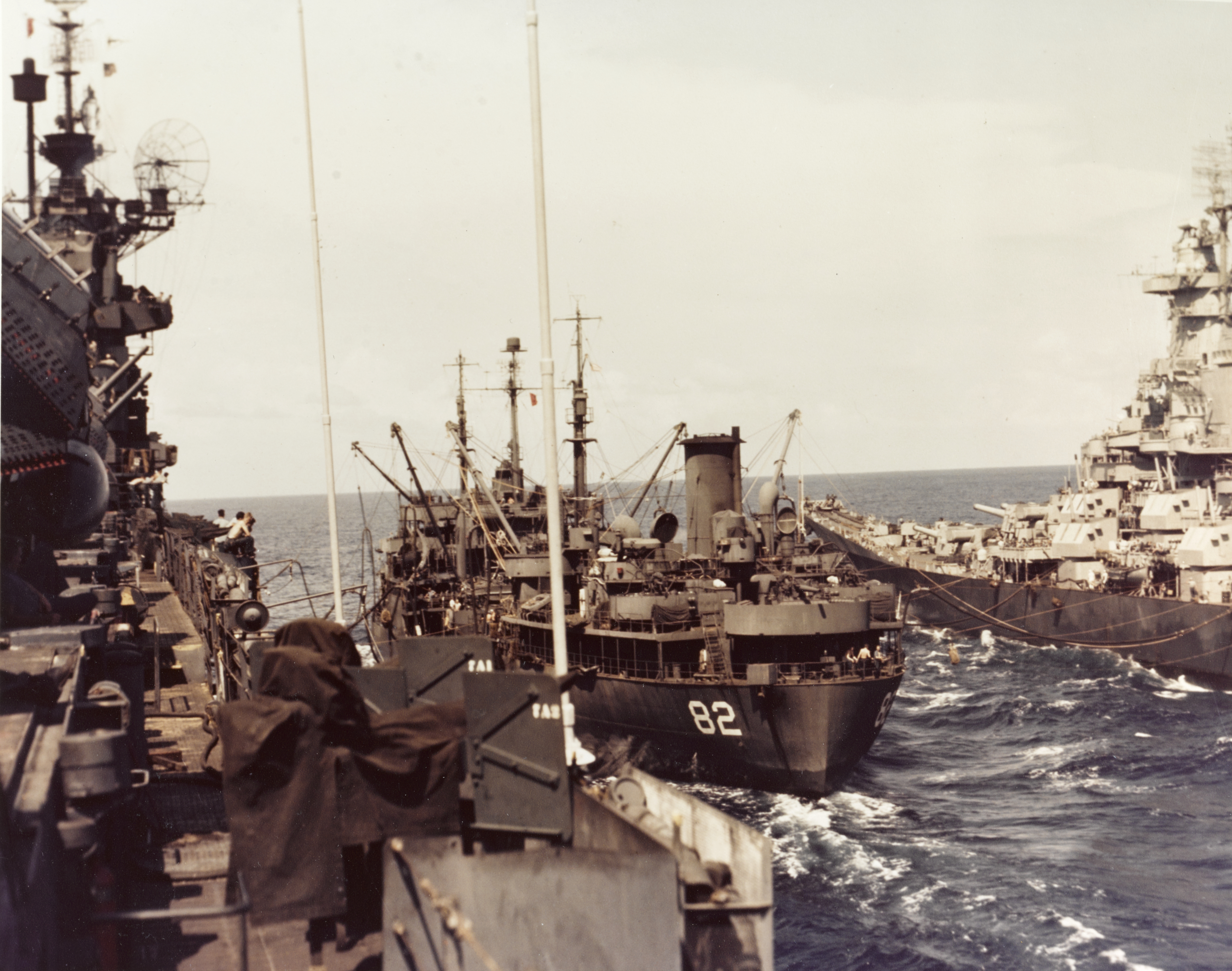
- Cahaba fueling Iowa and Shangri-La, 1945

History

United States
- Name: USS Cahaba
- Namesake: Cahaba River in Alabama
- Builder: Marinship, Sausalito, California
- Launched: 19 May 1943
- Commissioned: 14 January 1944
- Decommissioned: 15 May 1946
- Acquired: 5 March 1948
- In service: 8 May 1949, as USNS Cahaba (T-AO-82)
- Out of service: 19 June 1956
- Honors and awards: 8 battle stars (World War II)
- Fate: Acquired by the US Army, 11 May 1966; Returned to the Maritime Administration, 30 August 1971; Sold for scrapping, 30 August 1971

General characteristics
- Type: Escambia-class replenishment oiler
- Displacement: 5,782 long tons (5,875 t) light; 21,880 long tons (22,231 t) full
- Length: 523 ft 6 in (159.56 m)
- Beam: 68 ft (21 m)
- Draft: 30 ft 10 in (9.40 m)
- Propulsion: Turbo-electric, single screw, 8,000 shp (5,966 kW)
- Speed: 15 knots (28 km/h; 17 mph)
- Capacity: 140,000 barrels (22,000 m^{3})
- Complement: 267
- Armament: 1 × 5"/38 caliber dual purpose gun; 4 × 3"/50 caliber guns; 4 × twin 40 mm guns; 4 × twin 20 mm guns

USS Cahaba (AO-82) was an Escambia-class replenishment oiler acquired by the United States Navy for use during World War II. She had the dangerous but necessary task of providing fuel to vessels in combat and non-combat areas primarily in the Pacific Ocean. For her brave efforts, she received eight battle stars during the war.

Cahaba, a T2-SE-A2 tanker hull, was launched on 19 May 1943 as Lackawapen (later changed to Lackawaxen) by Marinship Corp., Sausalito, California, under a Maritime Commission contract (MC hull 1261), sponsored by Mrs. B. Bloomquist. Transferred to the Navy on 15 August 1943 and commissioned on 14 January 1944 and reported to the Pacific Fleet.

== World War II Pacific Theatre operations ==
Cahaba cleared San Pedro, California, on 11 February 1944 for Pearl Harbor and Majuro, arriving on 1 April. After two weeks as station oiler there, she put to sea to fuel task force TF 58 from 13 April to 2 May, as the massive task force hurled air attacks against the Palaus, Truk, and Hollandia. Returning to Majuro, the oiler based there for two fueling runs to Kwajalein and one refueling voyage to Pearl Harbor between 3 May and 13 June.

With the development of the Marianas operation, Cahaba's base became Eniwetok from 28 June, as she fueled 5th Fleet ships for their strikes on Guam, Saipan, and Tinian. As the fleet she served moved westward, Cahaba followed, serving as station oiler at Ulithi from 13 October to 27 December, along with refueling 3rd Fleet units at sea from 14 to 30 October. Supporting the Lingayen Gulf Covering Force, the oiler took station in Kossol Roads from 28 December 1944 to 26 January 1945, then returned to Ulithi. She contributed to the successful assault on Iwo Jima by fueling TF 58 ships at sea from 23 February to 4 March.

== End-of-war activity ==
Following a much-needed overhaul, Cahaba sailed from San Pedro, California, to the kamikaze-ridden waters off Okinawa, delivering oil to the station tanker at Kerama Retto late in June 1945. Through the close of the war, she sailed out of Ulithi refueling the 3rd Fleet at sea as it carried out its final smashing raids on the Japanese homeland. Clearing Ulithi on 3 September, the oiler paused at Okinawa, then sailed on to Shanghai to aid in the reoccupation by Chinese Nationalists of areas held by the Japanese during the war. Occupation duty at Okinawa, Formosa, Hong Kong, and Amoy continued until 16 March 1946, when she cleared for the Panama Canal and New York City, arriving on 28 April. Cahaba was decommissioned on 15 May 1946, and transferred to the Maritime Commission on 8 May 1947.

== Transferred to MSTS operations ==
Reacquired in March 1948 and transferred to the Military Sea Transportation Service on 31 July 1950, Cahaba served in a noncommissioned status until 20 January 1958 when she was returned to the Maritime Administration.

== Transferred to the U.S. Army ==
Cahaba was acquired by the United States Army in 1966 and converted to a floating power station for Vietnam service at Bender Shipbuilding and Repair Co., Mobile, Alabama.

== Final decommissioning ==
She was struck from the Navy List at an unknown date. Subsequently, she was scrapped in 1971.

== Awards ==
Cahaba received eight battle stars for World War II service.
