= USS Anacostia (AO-94) =

Oiler of the United States Navy

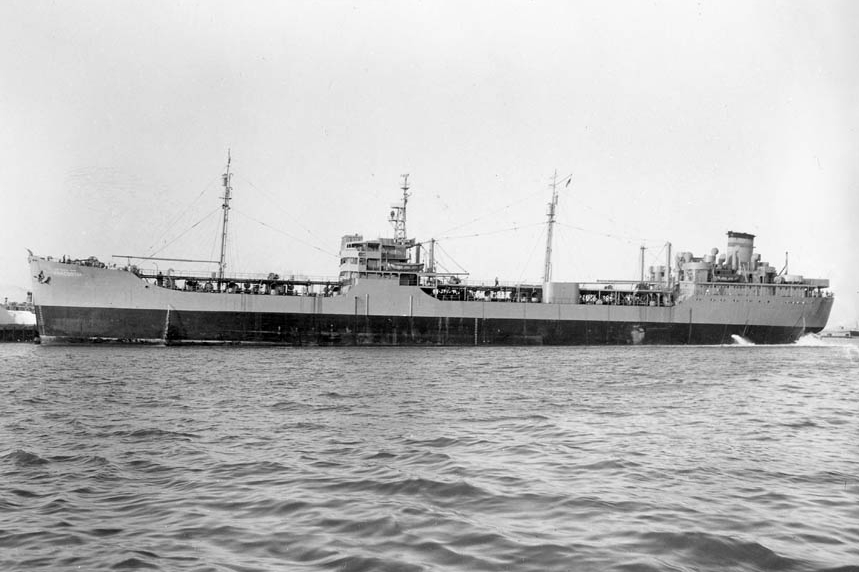
- Anacostia in the 1950s

History

United States
- Name: USS Anacostia
- Namesake: Anacostia River
- Builder: Marinship, Sausalito, California
- Laid down: 16 July 1944
- Launched: 24 September 1944
- Commissioned: 25 February 1945
- Decommissioned: 16 April 1946
- Stricken: 8 May 1946
- Acquired: 28 February 1948
- In service: 18 July 1950, as USNS Anacostia (T-AO-94)
- Out of service: December 1957
- Stricken: 17 December 1957
- Honors and awards: 1 battle star (World War II)
- Fate: Transferred to MARAD, 1957. Sold in 1967.

History
- Name: Penn Ranger (1967–73); Omnium Ranger (1973–78)
- Owner: Penn Shipping Co Inc (1967–73); Omnium Transportation Co (1973–78)
- Operator: Penn Shipping Co Inc (1967–73); Omnium Transportation Co (1973–78)
- Port of registry: Wilmington, Delaware, United States (1967–73); Panama (1973–78)
- Fate: Scrapped in 1978

General characteristics
- Type: Escambia-class replenishment oiler
- Displacement: 5,782 long tons (5,875 t) light; 21,880 long tons (22,231 t) full; 14,177 GRT (1967–78)
- Length: 523 ft 6 in (159.56 m)
- Beam: 68 ft (21 m)
- Draft: 30 ft 10 in (9.40 m)
- Propulsion: Turbo-electric, single screw, 8,000 shp (5,966 kW)
- Speed: 15 knots (28 km/h; 17 mph)
- Capacity: 140,000 barrels (22,000 m^{3})
- Complement: 267
- Armament: 1 × 5"/38 caliber dual purpose gun; 4 × 3"/50 caliber guns; 4 × twin 40 mm guns; 4 × twin 20 mm guns

USS Anacostia (AO-94) was a Escambia-class replenishment oiler acquired by the United States Navy for use during World War II. She had the dangerous but necessary task of providing fuel to vessels in combat and non-combat areas. She served in the Pacific Ocean Theater of operations late in the war, and returned home with one battle star.

The ship was laid down under a United States Maritime Commission contract (MC hull 1829) on 16 July 1944 at Sausalito, California, by the Marinship Corp., as Mission Alamo. Renamed Anacostia (AO-94) on 24 July 1944, she was launched on 24 September 1944, sponsored by Mrs. Henry F. Bruns, the wife of Rear Admiral Bruns, and acquired by the Navy and placed in commission on 25 February 1945.

== World War II Pacific Theatre operations ==
After a final fitting out period, the oiler left San Francisco Bay on 23 March 1945 and proceeded to San Diego, California, where she underwent three weeks of intensive shakedown training. Anacostia departed the U.S. West Coast on 27 April and set a course for Hawaii. She reached Pearl Harbor on 3 May and reported for duty to Service Squadron 8, Service Force, Pacific Fleet. Two days later, the vessel left Hawaiian waters and sailed to the Caroline Islands.

Upon her arrival at Ulithi on 16 May, Anacostia joined Task Group (TG) 50.8 and proceeded with that group to Okinawa. Early in June, the oiler arrived in a designated fueling area off Okinawa and replenished the bunkers of various ships. After completing this task, she sailed to Saipan to take on a cargo of gasoline to be distributed among forces there at Okinawa. During August and September, Anacostia made two more round-trips between Ulithi and Okinawa, taking on fuel at the former port and discharging it at the latter.

== End-of-war operations ==
At the time of the Japanese capitulation on 15 August, Anacostia was in port in Ulithi. She moved on to Okinawa six days later and remained there through 25 October. The oiler then sailed to the Japanese home islands and touched at Kanoya on the 30th. She also visited the Japanese port of Kagoshima, Kyūshū. At each point, she acted as station tanker at United States Army air bases.

Anacostia got underway for the Philippines early in December and arrived at Manila shortly thereafter. She operated in Philippine waters for approximately two months before commencing another trip to Okinawa on 2 February 1946. From that island, she sailed for Pearl Harbor and reached Hawaiian waters on 7 March. The next day, she weighed anchor and shaped a course for the Gulf Coast via the Panama Canal. She transited the canal late in March and arrived at New Orleans, Louisiana, on 29 March.

Anacostia moved to Mobile, Alabama, on the 30th and began inactivation preparations there. She was decommissioned at Mobile on 16 April 1946 and was transferred by the United States Maritime Commission that same day. Her name was struck from the Navy List on 8 May 1946.

== Assigned to Naval Transport Service ==
The vessel was reacquired on 28 February 1948 by the United States Naval Transport Service. During the next two years, Anacostia operated along the east coast of the United States; made numerous voyages through the Suez Canal to Ras Tanura, Saudi Arabia, and Bahrain to take on petroleum; visited ports in England and northern Germany; carried out several trips to Aruba to load up with petroleum; and paid calls to Japanese ports of Yokohama, Yokosuka, and Sasebo.

== Assigned to MSTS ==
She was assigned to the Military Sea Transportation Service (MSTS) on 18 July 1950 and reported to Tankers Co. Inc., for operation under an MSTS contract, was redesignated USNS Anacostia (T-AO-94), and was run as a non-commissioned vessel crewed by the civil service.

During the next seven years, Anacostia continued her service as an oiler. She made frequent trips to ports along the Texas gulf coast as well as to the Persian Gulf ports of Ras Tanura, Saudi Arabia, and Bahrain to take on petroleum. Her cargoes were then delivered to facilities at ports in Japan, England, the Netherlands, and[Germany. The oiler remained active until December 1957, when she reported to Norfolk, Virginia. She was then turned over to the Maritime Administration and laid up with the National Defense Reserve Fleet in the James River. Her name was struck from the Navy List on 17 December 1957.

== Merchant service ==
Anacostia was sold to Penn Shipping Co Inc, Wilmington, Delaware in 1967 and converted to a 14,177 GRT bulk carrier with the bow section from Nautilus being fitted; her own bow section was scrapped. She was renamed Penn Ranger. She was sold to Omnium Transportation Co, Panama. in 1973 and was renamed Omnium Ranger. She was scrapped at Castelló de la Plana, Spain in 1978.

== Awards ==
Anacostia earned one battle star for her World War II service.
