= USS Pamanset =

Oiler of the United States Navy

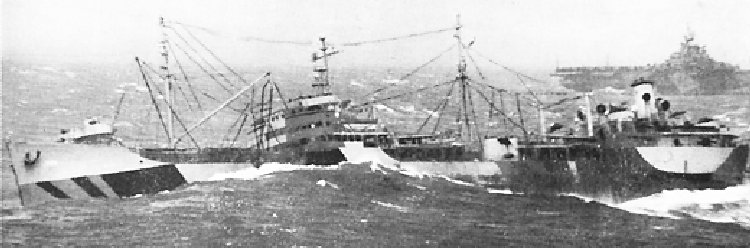

History

United States
- Name: Pamanset
- Namesake: Pamanset River in Massachusetts
- Builder: Marinship, Sausalito, California
- Laid down: 30 March 1943
- Launched: 25 June 1943
- Commissioned: 30 April 1944
- Decommissioned: 18 March 1946
- Stricken: 28 March 1946
- Honors and awards: 6 battle stars (World War II)

History
- Operator: Military Sea Transportation Service
- Acquired: 10 February 1948
- In service: 1 October 1949, as USNS Pamanset (T-AO-85)
- Out of service: 26 September 1957
- Identification: IMO number: 6709141
- Fate: Transferred to Hudson Waterways Corp., 3 May 1966; Sold for scrapping, 12 March 1986

General characteristics
- Type: Escambia-class replenishment oiler
- Displacement: 5,782 long tons (5,875 t) light; 21,880 long tons (22,231 t) full
- Length: 523 ft 6 in (159.56 m)
- Beam: 68 ft (21 m)
- Draft: 30 ft 10 in (9.40 m)
- Installed power: 8,000 shp (5,966 kW)
- Propulsion: Turbo-electric, single screw
- Speed: 15 knots (28 km/h; 17 mph)
- Capacity: 140,000 barrels (22,000 m^{3})
- Complement: 267
- Armament: 1 × 5"/38 caliber dual purpose gun; 4 × 3"/50 caliber guns; 4 × twin 40 mm guns; 4 × twin 20 mm guns

USS Pamanset (AO-85) was a Escambia-class replenishment oiler acquired by the United States Navy for use during World War II. She had the dangerous but necessary task of providing fuel to vessels in combat and non-combat areas.

She was laid down as MC hull 1264 by the Marinship Corp., Sausalito, California, under a Maritime Commission contract on 30 March 1943, launched on 25 June 1943, sponsored by Mrs. W. B. Murray, acquired by the Navy and commissioned on 30 April 1944.

== World War II operations ==
Following shakedown, Pamanset sailed for Pearl Harbor and duty with the Pacific Fleet during the final months of World War II. Departing Pearl Harbor on 24 July 1944, she steamed to the Marshall Islands, then to the Admiralty Islands where she spent the next several months refueling units of the 3rd Fleet. She continued her support of the 3rd Fleet during the Western Caroline and Philippine Islands engagements in the fall of 1944 as well as during the Formosa and China coast attacks early in 1945. Refueling operations in very heavy seas in January 1945, resulted in injuries to several of her crew. Pamanset arrived off Iwo Jima on 26 February and participated in that campaign until returning to Ulithi on 2 March, thence proceeding to San Pedro, California, for extensive repairs. She was underway again on 4 June for the Western Pacific and serviced the 3rd Fleet in various fueling areas until the end of the war.

After extensive operations in support of the occupation fleet in Japanese home waters, she departed Yokohama, Japan, on 8 November for San Francisco, California, where she decommissioned on 18 March 1946. She was struck from the Naval Vessel Register on 28 March and transferred to the Maritime Commission on 11 October.

== Transferred to MSTS ==
Reacquired on 10 February 1948, she was assigned to Military Sea Transportation Service (MSTS) on 1 October 1949, as USNS Pamanset (T-AO-85), manned by a merchant crew. After necessary fitting out and trials, she added to her wartime record by rendering valuable service during the Korean War. She was struck from the Naval Vessel Register and transferred to the Maritime Administration (MARAD) Reserve Fleet on 24 February 1956, reinstated again on 26 June for MSTS contract operations, then struck on 26 September 1957.

== Disposal ==
The ship was sold to the Hudson Waterways Corporation on 3 May 1966 and renamed Seatrain Florida. She was subsequently lengthened using part of the midsection of another T2 tanker, the Fruitvale Hills, and rebuilt by Newport News Shipbuilding into one of seven Seatrain Lines multi-purpose cargo ships capable of carrying general bulk and palletized cargo, intermodal containers, vehicles and rail cars. Upon completion of the conversion and delivery in March 1967 Seatrain Florida, IMO 6119807, was chartered to the MSTS in support of overseas U.S. military operations, including the transport of material, equipment and aircraft to Vietnam. The ship was transferred to the National Defense Reserve Fleet (James River) in October 1974 and on 8 August 1978, her name was changed to just Florida. The ship was retired and broken up in 1986.
