= USS Mascoma =

Oiler of the United States Navy

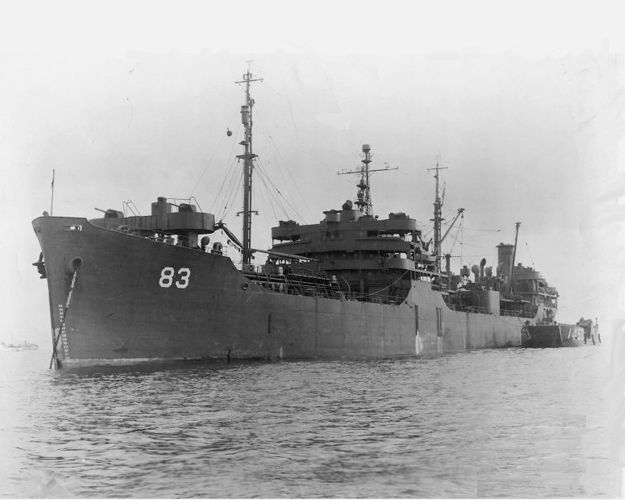
- USS Mascoma

History

United States
- Name: USS Mascoma
- Namesake: Mascoma River in New Hampshire
- Builder: Marinship, Sausalito, California
- Laid down: 31 January 1943
- Launched: 31 May 1943
- Commissioned: 3 February 1944, as USS Mascoma (AO-83)
- Decommissioned: 17 December 1945
- Stricken: 8 January 1946
- Acquired: 4 February 1948
- In service: 27 July 1950, as USNS Mascoma (T-AO-83)
- Out of service: 18 June 1959
- Stricken: 18 June 1959
- Identification: IMO number: 6704476
- Honors and awards: 7 battle stars (World War II)
- Fate: Sold into commercial service, 10 September 1969, scrapped 1980

General characteristics
- Type: Escambia-class replenishment oiler
- Displacement: 5,532 long tons (5,621 t) light; 21,880 long tons (22,231 t) full
- Length: 523 ft 6 in (159.56 m)
- Beam: 68 ft (21 m)
- Draft: 30 ft 10 in (9.40 m)
- Propulsion: Turbo-electric, single screw, 8,000 shp (5,966 kW)
- Speed: 18 knots (33 km/h; 21 mph)
- Capacity: 140,000 barrels (22,000 m^{3})
- Complement: 267
- Armament: 1 × 5"/38 caliber dual purpose gun; 4 × 3"/50 caliber guns; 12 × single 20 mm AA guns

USS Mascoma (AO-83) was a Escambia-class replenishment oiler constructed for the United States Navy during World War II. She served her country in the Pacific Ocean Theatre of Operations, and provided petroleum products where needed to combat ships. For her very dangerous work under combat conditions, she was awarded seven battle stars by war's end.

Mascoma, built by the Marinship Corp., Sausalito, California, under Maritime Commission contract, was launched on 31 May 1943, sponsored by Mrs. W. C. Ryan; converted by the Swan Island Yard, Kaiser Corp., Portland, Oregon; accepted and commissioned on 3 February 1944.

== World War II Pacific Theatre operations ==
On 14 May 1944, Mascoma got underway for the Pacific theater to serve as a fleet oiler. She arrived at Kwajalein on 4 June and fueled ships there until departing for Majuro on the 13th. At Majuro through the 21st she encountered her first experience with boiler trouble, an experience which was to be repeated throughout her wartime operations. In spite of boiler problems, she sailed for Eniwetok on the 22nd, taking up fueling assignments there on the 25th and effecting repairs to her boilers. Toward the end of July the oiler steamed for the fueling area off Saipan, remaining in support of the Saipan, Tinian, and Guam operations until 1 August. She then consolidated her fuel into Cimarron (AO-22) and departed for Eniwetok en route to Pearl Harbor.

== Supporting attack on the Philippines ==
Resupplied, Mascoma returned to Majuro on 2 September, continuing on to Manus the following week. She arrived in the Admiralties on the 13th and departed again on the 18th to lend support to the first carrier task force attack on the Philippines.

On 26 September, while in the fueling area, the tanker again developed boiler trouble and was dead in the water for over 16 hours. Having effected temporary repairs during that time, she returned to Manua arriving on 1 October and remaining until the 10th for further repairs.

== Mississinewa hit by kaiten and explodes ==
Mascoma next sailed for Kossol Roads, where she served as station tanker from 13 October through 18 November. She then steamed for Ulithi, arriving on the 19th. At anchor at Ulithi the next morning, her crew witnessed the first use of one of Japan's weapons of last resort, the "kaiten" human torpedo. On that morning, 20 November, Mississinewa (AO-59), moored near Mascoma, was rocked with explosions caused by a direct hit with a kaiten launched from the I-47. This suicide sortie had been led by Lt. Sekio Nishinu, one of the kaiten's inventors. Boatcrews from Mascoma rescued 21 survivors from Mississinewa.

== Riding out a typhoon ==
Nine days later Mascoma attempted to return to the fueling area, but was turned back by heavy weather. She departed again for the area on 10 December, but, on the 16th, was forced by an approaching typhoon to break off operations. On the 17th boiler trouble again caused her to cut off her engines. Underway nine hours later, she rode out the storm with only one boiler in operation. On the 19th she resumed fueling operations and returned to Ulithi for repairs on the 24th.

== Stateside yard availability ==
The next month, January 1945, she sailed to California for Navy Yard availability at San Pedro, California, returning to Ulithi on 18 April. The next day she was en route to Okinawa to supply fuel to the forces in that campaign. Before mid-July, she returned to that area three times, replenishing, after each fueling period, at Ulithi.

== End-of-war activity ==
On 10 July, Mascoma departed Ulithi to rendezvous with units of task group TG 38.1, then involved in attacks on the Japanese home islands. She returned to Ulithi on 1 August, replenished her supplies and was underway again by the 8th. On the 9th engine trouble once again forced Mascoma to drop out of formation. Ordered to Saipan, she was unable to rejoin her task group until the 20th, by which time hostilities had ended. She continued fueling at sea operations until the 28th, when she steamed for Japan. In Japan she carried out harbor fueling assignments at Sagami Wan, before proceeding to Tokyo Bay, she was the first ship in the harbor after Japan surrendered, as she was the closest ship at the time, where she witnessed the official surrender on 2 September. The next day, 3 September, she returned to Ulithi for fueling assignments and, again, repairs to her boilers.

On 24 October, the oiler departed for the United States, arriving on 26 November at Norfolk, Virginia, where she decommissioned on 17 December. Struck from the Naval Vessel Register on 8 January 1946, she was transferred to the Maritime Commission on 27 June 1946. Returned to the Navy, she was accepted by the 3rd Naval District and reactivated on 4 February 1948. In August 1949 she was berthed at Orange, Texas, as a unit of the Atlantic Reserve Fleet, but was reactivated again on 27 July 1950.

== Supporting the Korean War effort ==
From that time through 1959 she served as a non-commissioned Naval vessel USNS Mascoma (T-AO-83), crewed by civilian personnel under contract to the Military Sea Transportation Service. In that capacity, Mascoma continued her record of wartime support by serving off the Korean coast from 14 February 1954 through the signing of the Armistice on 27 July, remaining in the area until 13 August 1953. For this service, performed as a merchant ship, she received the Korean Service Medal and the United Nations Korea Medal.

== Decommissioning ==
She was struck from the Naval Vessel Register on 18 June 1959 and sold to Seatrain Lines Inc., for conversion to a containerized cargo ship.

The ship was sold to the Hudson Waterways Corporation on 4 November 1966 under the MARAD Exchange Program and renamed Seatrain Oregon. She was transferred to Transwestern Associates, Inc. and renamed Transchamplain, IMO 6704476, in September 1967. In 1969 she was converted to a container ship by Savannah Machine and Foundry. Upon completion of the conversion she was sold to C.I.T. Corp. and began hauling containerized cargo for Seatrain Lines between U.S. west coast ports and Hawaii, Guam and other U.S. Pacific territories. In 1974 Transchamplain was leased to Matson, Inc. when Seatrain sold its Hawaiian operations to the Hawaiian-based shipping company. The ship was sold to be scrapped in 1980.

== Awards ==
For her service during World War II, Mascoma was awarded seven battle stars.
