= USS Tomahawk (AO-88) =

Oiler of the United States Navy

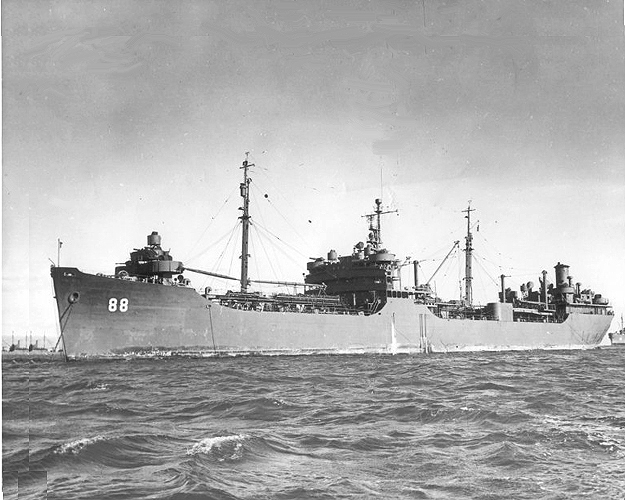

History

United States
- Name: USS Tomahawk
- Namesake: Tomahawk River in Wisconsin
- Builder: Marinship, Sausalito, California
- Laid down: 1 June 1943
- Launched: 10 Oct 1943
- Commissioned: 16 April 1944
- Decommissioned: 6 January 1946
- Stricken: 21 January 1946
- In service: 1950, as USNS Tomahawk (T-AO-88)
- Out of service: September 1961
- Identification: IMO number: 6709804
- Honors and awards: 6 battle stars (World War II)
- Fate: Sold into commercial service, 1966

General characteristics
- Type: Escambia-class replenishment oiler
- Displacement: 5,782 long tons (5,875 t) light; 21,880 long tons (22,231 t) full
- Length: 523 ft 6 in (159.56 m)
- Beam: 68 ft (21 m)
- Draft: 30 ft 10 in (9.40 m)
- Propulsion: Turbo-electric, single screw, 8,000 shp (5,966 kW)
- Speed: 15 knots (28 km/h; 17 mph)
- Capacity: 140,000 barrels (22,000 m^{3})
- Complement: 267
- Armament: 1 × 5"/38 caliber dual purpose gun; 4 × 3"/50 caliber guns; 4 × twin 40 mm guns; 4 × twin 20 mm guns

USS Tomahawk (AO-88) was an Escambia-class fleet oiler acquired by the United States Navy for use during World War II. She had the dangerous but necessary task of providing fuel to vessels in combat and non-combat areas primarily in the Pacific Ocean. For her valiant efforts, she received six battle stars during the war.

The first Tomahawk, to be so named by the Navy, was laid down under Maritime Commission contract (MC hull 1267) on 1 June 1943 by Marinship Corporation of Sausalito, California, launched on 10 October 1943, sponsored by Mrs. W. L, Kidneigh, and commissioned at Portland, Oregon, on 16 April 1944.

== World War II Pacific Theatre operations ==
Early in July 1944. Tomahawk completed her shakedown off the U.S. West Coast and steamed via Pearl Harbor for the Marshalls. The oiler arrived at Eniwetok on the 24th, reported for duty with Service Squadron 10, and was soon underway for fueling operations in the Marianas. During August, she contributed logistic support for the final stages of the fight for the Marianas.

On 26 August, Tomahawk departed Eniwetok for Manus with a logistics task unit for the 3rd Fleet. Steaming from Seeadler Harbor on the 31st, she relieved oilers Schuylkill (AO-76) and Millicoma (AO-73) which had collided. Through September and October, Tomahawk continued fueling duties for the 3rd Fleet, operating out of Seeadler Harbor. On 18 October, she rendezvoused with the damaged cruisers Houston (CL-81) and Canberra (CA-70) as they returned from a successful Fast Carrier Task Force strike on Formosa. After refueling the battle-scarred ships and their escort, Tomahawk continued on to her assigned area where she provided support for units active in the battle for Leyte Gulf.

== Under attack by midget submarine ==
On 20 November 1944, Tomahawk was anchored at Ulithi when a Japanese midget submarine penetrated the lagoon. The undersea raider sent fleet oiler Mississinewa (AO-59) down in flames before being rammed and sunk by destroyer Case (DD-370) just a mile and one-half from Tomahawk.

As the year ended, Tomahawk continued fueling missions and, in January, ranged as far as Leyte Gulf in support of the 5th Fleet. In the early months of 1945, Tomahawk continued to operate out of Ulithi providing direct logistic support to the fleet in and near the combat zone. During the first two weeks of February, she fueled units of Admiral Raymond A. Spruance's 5th Fleet preparatory to operations off Nanpo Shoto and, later in the month, supported Task Force 58 which was striking targets in the Tokyo area. In March, Tomahawk fueled units in preparation for strikes on Nansei Shoto and Japan.

== Fighting off air attacks ==
While at Kerama Retto early in April, Tomahawk fought off enemy air raiders and later suffered some minor damage to her plating and degaussing cable while fueling Arkansas (BB-33). Returning to Ulithi in April, Tomahawk continued underway replenishment operations in support of the Fast Carrier Task Force before steaming from Ulithi in May, bound for overhaul at Portland, Oregon.

== End-of-war activity ==
Repairs completed, she got underway again on 20 July 1945 and proceeded via San Francisco, California, to Pearl Harbor. The successes of American naval forces in the Pacific made it possible for her to make the entire voyage to the Carolines without an escort. She arrived at Ulithi just in time for the unconditional surrender of Japan. She subsequently performed fueling tasks and exercises with units of Admiral William F. Halsey's 3rd Fleet, operating out of Tokyo and Ulithi before departing Tokyo late in October. Tomahawk steamed via San Francisco and the Panama Canal for the U.S. East Coast and arrived at Norfolk, Virginia, on 11 December 1945.

== Service under MSTS ==
Tomahawk was decommissioned on 5 January 1946 and was struck from the Navy List on 21 January 1946. Following re-conversion at Norfolk, she was turned over to the Military Sea Transportation Service (MSTS), to serve as USNS Tomahawk (T-AO-88). Through the remaining 1940s and throughout the 1950s, she served in decommissioned status, carrying fuel for the American fleet around the world. In September 1961, the tanker was transferred to the Maritime Administration (MARAD), assigned to the National Defense Reserve Fleet, and berthed in Suisun Bay, California.

The ship was sold to the Hudson Waterways Corporation on 16 July 1966, and renamed Seatrain Maine. She was subsequently lengthened using sections of two other T2 tankers, the Mission San Jose and Mission San Diego, and rebuilt by Maryland Shipbuilding and Drydock Company into one of seven Seatrain Lines multi-purpose cargo ships capable of carrying general bulk and palletized cargo, intermodal containers, vehicles and rail cars. Upon completion of the conversion and delivery in 1967 Seatrain Maine, IMO 6709804, was chartered to the MSTS in support of overseas U.S. military operations, including the transport of material, equipment and aircraft to Vietnam. The ship was transferred to the National Defense Reserve Fleet (James River) in 1973 and on 8 August 1978, her name was changed to just Maine. In 1990 Maine was reactivated for service in support of the First Persion Gulf War and later returned to the Reserve Fleet (Beaumont, Texas). Still at Beaumont as of 2010, her ultimate disposition is unknown.

== Awards ==
Tomahawk received six battle stars for World War II.
