= USS Ocklawaha =

Oiler of the United States Navy

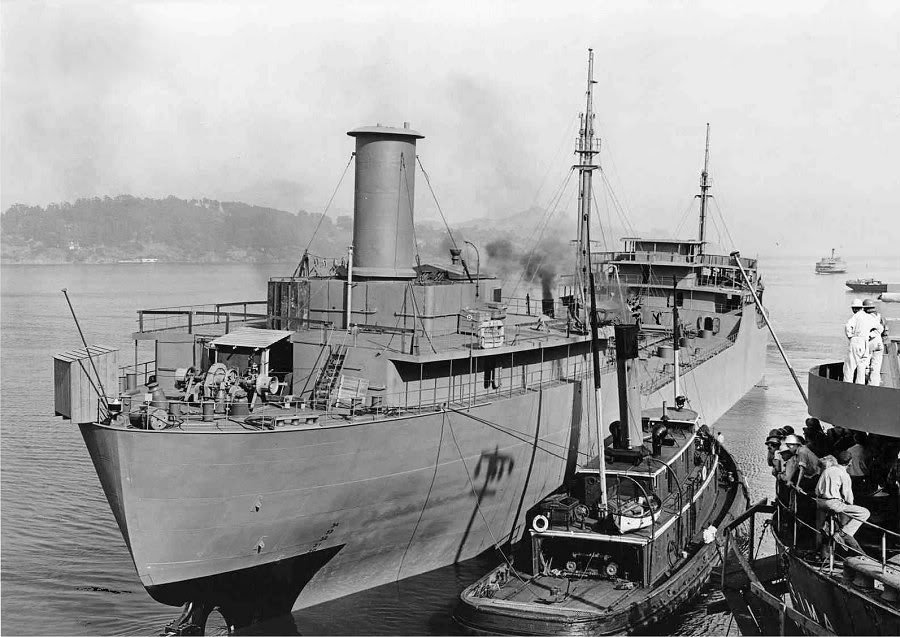
- Ocklawaha fitting out in June 1943

History

United States
- Name: USS Ocklawaha
- Namesake: Ocklawaha River
- Builder: Marinship, Sausalito, California
- Laid down: 10 February 1943
- Launched: 9 June 1943
- Commissioned: 9 March 1944
- Decommissioned: 19 July 1946
- Stricken: 23 April 1947
- Acquired: 22 May 1948
- In service: 1 October 1949, as USNS Ocklawaha (T-AO-84)
- Stricken: 9 June 1959
- Honors and awards: 2 battle stars (World War II)
- Fate: Sold for scrapping 20 September 1975

General characteristics
- Type: Escambia-class replenishment oiler
- Displacement: 5,782 long tons (5,875 t) light; 21,880 long tons (22,231 t) full
- Length: 523 ft 6 in (159.56 m)
- Beam: 68 ft (21 m)
- Draft: 30 ft 10 in (9.40 m)
- Propulsion: Turbo-electric, single screw, 8,000 shp (5,966 kW)
- Speed: 15 knots (28 km/h; 17 mph)
- Capacity: 140,000 barrels (22,000 m^{3})
- Complement: 267
- Armament: 1 × 5"/38 caliber dual purpose gun; 4 × 3"/50 caliber guns; 4 × twin 40 mm guns; 4 × twin 20 mm guns

USS Ocklawaha (AO-84) was a Escambia-class replenishment oiler acquired by the United States Navy for use during World War II. She had the dangerous but necessary task of providing water to smaller vessels not fitted with water-makers in combat and non-combat areas.

She was laid down on 10 February 1943, as a Maritime Commission type T2-SE-A2 tanker hull under a Maritime Commission contract at Marinship, Sausalito, California. She was launched on 9 June 1943, sponsored by Mrs. Van W. Rosendahl, and commissioned as USS Ocklawaha (AO-84) on 9 March 1944.

== World War II operations ==
Following conversion and fitting out for carrying potable water, and after shakedown operations off the west coast, Ocklawaha sailed on 19 May 1944 for duty with Service Forces Pacific (ServPac) during the remainder of World War II. She arrived at Eniwetok, Marshall Islands, in June 1944 to provide potable water for and to become a part of the forces being assembled there for the Marianas operations. Following the conquest of Saipan and Guam, she continued to supply fresh water in the forward areas, transporting 12 additional loads from Pearl Harbor and Manus to Eniwetok, Ulithi, Guam, Kossol Passage and Leyte Gulf. During this period, she delivered water to 809 ships, mostly landing vessels actively engaged in amphibious operations against the Japanese.

Ocklawaha returned to San Pedro, California, on 1 June 1945 for overhaul, then deployed again to the Western and South West Pacific areas where she continued her service operations until 29 May 1946. She returned to San Pedro on 15 June, transited the Panama Canal on 28 June, thence proceeded to New York where she decommissioned on 19 July. She was struck from the Naval Vessel Register, and transferred to the Maritime Commission on 23 April 1947.

== Transferred to MSTS ==
Reacquired by the U.S. Navy on 22 May 1948, Ocklawaha was simultaneously transferred to the Marine Transport Lines, Inc. then assigned on 1 October 1949 to the Military Sea Transportation Service manned by a merchant crew. As USNS Ocklawaha (T-AO-84) she saw active service in the Far East during the Korean War, then after alternating from active to inactive status for several years was struck from the Naval Register again and transferred to the Maritime Commission on 9 June 1959 for lay up in the National Defense Reserve Fleet. She was sold for scrapping, 2 September 1975, to Luria Bros. & Co. Inc. for $390,525.78. Ex-Ocklawah was withdrawn from the Reserve Fleet, to River Development Corp., Kearny, N. J. where she arrived 20 September 1975.
