= Tamalpais =

Tamalpais may refer to:

- Tamalpais, California, former name of Kentfield, California
- Tamalpais, California, former name of Tamalpais Valley, California
- Mount Tamalpais
- Tamalpais High School
- Tamalpais-Homestead Valley, California
- Tamalpais Union High School District
- Mount Tamalpais State Park
- USS Tamalpais (AO-96)

== See also ==
- Tamaulipas
