= Ocklawaha =

Ocklawaha may refer to:

- Ocklawaha, Florida, an unincorporated community
- Ocklawaha River, a river in Florida
- USS Ocklawaha (AO-84), a World War II tanker of the United States
