= Escambia-class oiler =

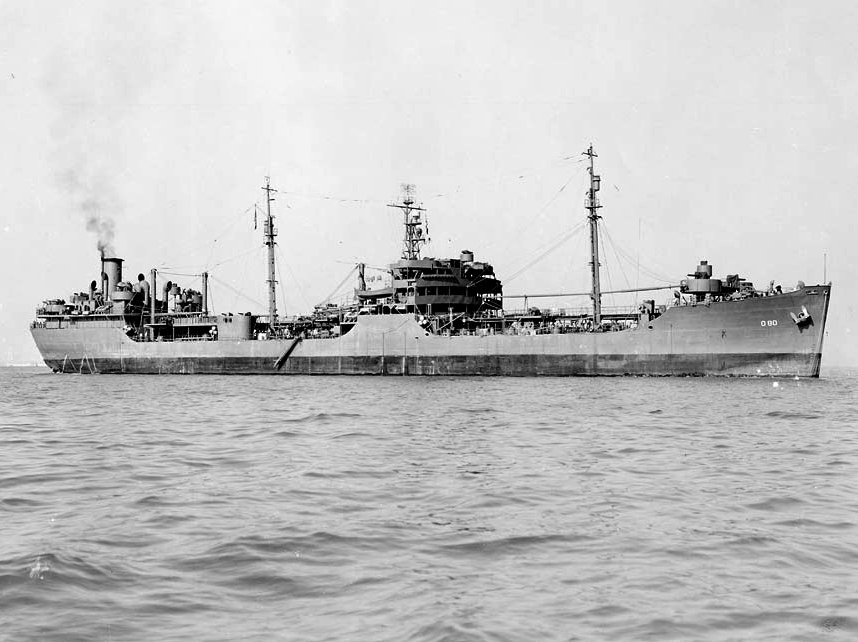
- Escambia in November 1943

Class overview
- Builders: Marinship, Sausalito, California
- Operators: United States Navy
- Built: 1942–1945
- In commission: 1943–1946
- Completed: 12

General characteristics
- Type: T2 Tanker
- Displacement: 5,782 long tons (5,875 t) light; 21,880 long tons (22,231 t) full
- Length: 523 ft 6 in (159.56 m)
- Beam: 68 ft (21 m)
- Draft: 30 ft 10 in (9.40 m)
- Propulsion: turbo-electric transmission, single screw, 8,000 shp (5,966 kW)
- Speed: 15 knots (28 km/h; 17 mph)
- Capacity: 140,000 barrels (22,000 m^{3})
- Complement: 267 officers and enlisted
- Armament: 1 × 5"/38 caliber dual purpose gun; 4 × 3"/50 caliber guns; 4 × twin 40 mm guns; 4 × twin 20 mm guns

The Escambia-class oilers were a class of twelve T2-SE-A2 tankers that served in the United States Navy, built during World War II. The ships were named for United States rivers with Native American names. They were very similar to the Suamico class (of which they are sometimes accounted a subclass), differing principally in having the more powerful turboelectric plant of the P2-SE2 transports which developed 10,000 shp.

All of the ships were decommissioned and transferred to the Military Sea Transportation Service in the post-war period. Several were later transferred to the United States Army and converted to floating electricity generating stations, and served in that role in Vietnam.

== Ships ==
- USS Escambia (AO-80), 1943
- USS Kennebago (AO-81), 1943
- USS Cahaba (AO-82), ex-Lackawapen, 1944
- USS Mascoma (AO-83), 1944
- USS Ocklawaha (AO-84), 1943
- USS Pamanset (AO-85), 1943
- USS Ponaganset (AO-86), 1944
- USS Sebec (AO-87), 1944
- USS Tomahawk (AO-88), 1944
- USS Pasig (AO-91), ex-Mission San Xavier, converted to AW-3
- USS Abatan (AO-92), ex-Mission San Lorenzo, converted to AW-4
- USS Soubarissen (AO-93), ex-Mission Santa Ana, converted to water supply ship.
- USS Anacostia (AO-94), ex-Mission Alamo, 1945
- USS Caney (AO-95), ex-Mission Los Angeles, 1945
- USS Tamalpais (AO-96), ex-Mission San Francisco, 1945

== See also ==
- Suamico-class replenishment oiler
- United States Navy oiler
- T2 tanker

== Bibliography ==
- Silverstone, Paul H. (2008). The Navy of World War II, 1922-1947. The U.S. Navy Warship Series. New York: Routledge. ISBN 978-0-415-97898-9.
