= USS Caney =

Oiler of the United States Navy

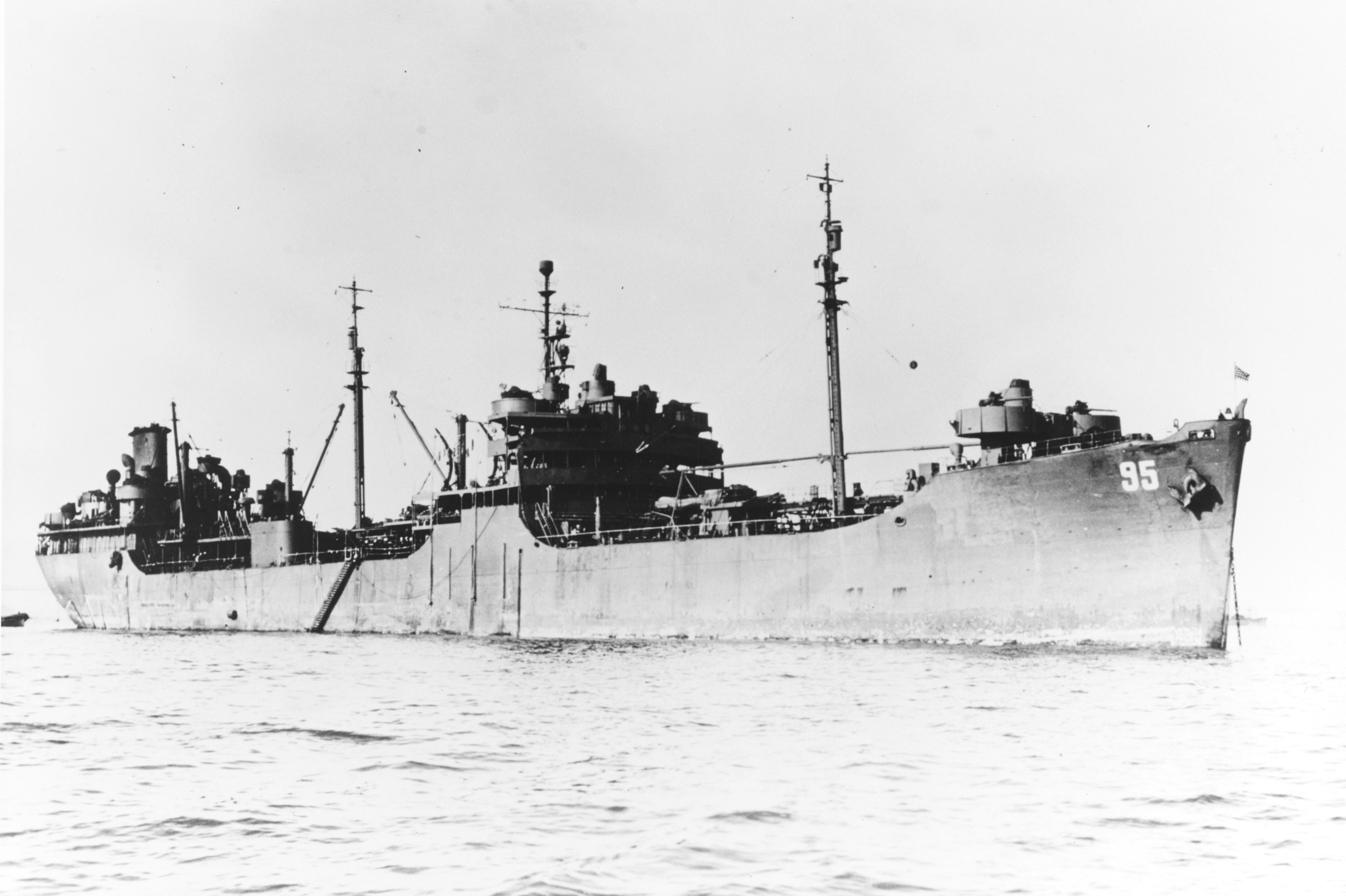
- Caney in 1945

History

United States
- Name: USS Caney
- Namesake: Caney River in Kansas and Oklahoma
- Builder: Marinship, Sausalito, California
- Launched: 8 October 1944
- Commissioned: 25 March 1945
- Decommissioned: 27 February 1946
- Stricken: 27 February 1946
- Acquired: February 1948
- In service: 18 July 1950, as USNS Caney (T-AO-95)
- Out of service: (date unknown)
- Stricken: (date unknown)
- Honors and awards: 2 battle stars (World War II)
- Fate: Acquired by the US Army, 1966; Scrapped 1974

General characteristics
- Type: Escambia-class replenishment oiler
- Displacement: 5,782 long tons (5,875 t) light; 21,880 long tons (22,231 t) full
- Length: 523 ft 6 in (159.56 m)
- Beam: 68 ft (21 m)
- Draft: 30 ft 10 in (9.40 m)
- Propulsion: Turbo-electric, single screw, 8,000 shp (5,966 kW)
- Speed: 15 knots (28 km/h; 17 mph)
- Capacity: 140,000 barrels (22,000 m^{3})
- Complement: 267
- Armament: 1 × 5"/38 caliber dual purpose gun; 4 × 3"/50 caliber guns; 4 × twin 40 mm guns; 4 × twin 20 mm guns

USS Caney (AO-95) was an Escambia-class replenishment oiler acquired by the United States Navy for use during World War II. She had the dangerous but necessary task of providing fuel to vessels in combat and non-combat areas. She served in the Pacific Ocean Theatre of operations late in the war, and returned home with two battle stars.

Caney was launched on 8 October 1944 by Marinship Corp., Sausalito, California, under a Maritime Commission contract; sponsored by Mrs. J. L. Simpson; acquired by the Navy on 25 March 1945, and commissioned the same day and reported to the Pacific Fleet.

== World War II Pacific Theatre operations ==
Caney sailed from San Pedro, California, on 12 May 1945 for Ulithi, the base from which she operated while fueling ships serving on radar picket and patrol duties at Okinawa. From 3 July through the end of the war, she steamed with the logistic group supporting task force TF 38 in its bombardments and air strikes pounding the Japanese home islands.

== End-of-war activity ==
The oiler remained off Okinawa serving ships engaged in occupation duty until 16 November, when she got underway for San Francisco, California, and Galveston, Texas. Caney was decommissioned on 27 February 1946 at Beaumont, Texas, and delivered to the War Shipping Administration the same day.

== Service under MSTS ==
Reacquired by the Navy in February 1948, she was transferred to the Military Sea Transportation Service on 18 July 1950, where she served as USNS Caney (T-AO-95) in a noncommissioned status with a civilian crew.

Caney was placed out of service and struck from the Naval Register on 21 May 1959. She was then transferred to MARAD for lay up in the National Defense Reserve Fleet, Mobile, Alabama.

== Service under the U.S. Army ==
Caney was acquired by the United States Army in 1966 and converted at Bender Shipbuilding and Repair Co., Mobile, Alabama, into a floating power station for Vietnam service.

== Fate ==
She was sold for scrapping on 9 September 1974, at Vung Tau, South Vietnam.

== Awards ==
Caney received two battle stars for World War II service.
