= Lackawaxen =

Lackawaxen may refer to:

== Places ==
In Pennsylvania:

- Lackawaxen River, a tributary of the Delaware River
- Lackawaxen Township, Pennsylvania, in Pike County

== Ships ==
- USS Cahaba (AO-82), World War II oiler launched as Lackawapen, later changed to Lackawaxen
