= Pine Point (California) =

Former human settlement

Coordinates: 37.8649°N 122.4963°W

Pine Point is a cape landform in Richardson Bay, Marin County, California near the town of Sausalito. There was an early 1900 rail line in operation in the vicinity of Pine Point. Pine Point was an area of early twentieth century residential land use, prior to the construction of Liberty ships in the local area.

"Sacrificed in this country’s great wartime mobilization following December 7, 1941, this small peninsula jutting out from the shoreline, once a snug residential enclave, provided the vital landfill required to create Marinship. And a small community of largely working class families had to be moved from the point before it was destroyed."

== Prehistory ==
The local area was originally inhabited by Native Americans, with the clearest demonstrable evidence of such early habitation on nearby Ring Mountain situated slightly to the north.

== See also ==
- Marinship
