= USNS French Creek =

History

United States
- Builder: Sun Shipbuilding and Drydock Co., Chester, Pennsylvania
- Launched: 8 December 1944
- Commissioned: 28 November 1956
- Decommissioned: 2 October 1967
- Fate: Scrapped in 1971

General characteristics
- Displacement: 5,782 long tons, 21,880 tons full load
- Length: 523 ft 6 in (159.56 m)
- Beam: 68 ft (21 m)
- Draft: 30 ft (9.1 m)
- Propulsion: turbo-electric, single screw. 8,000hp
- Speed: 15.5 knots (17.8 mph)
- Complement: 251

The SS French Creek was a type T2 tanker, more specifically a T2-SE-A1, that was built in 1944. The ship was built at Sun Shipbuilding and Drydock Co. in Chester, Pennsylvania as hull number 454 and USMC number 1787. In 1956, it was acquired by the US Navy from the Maritime Administration and placed in service as the USNS French Creek (T-AO-159). It was taken out of service and transferred to the US Army in 1967. It was then sent to Vietnam where it was used as a floating power station until its scrapping in 1971.
