= USS Soubarissen =

Oiler of the United States Navy

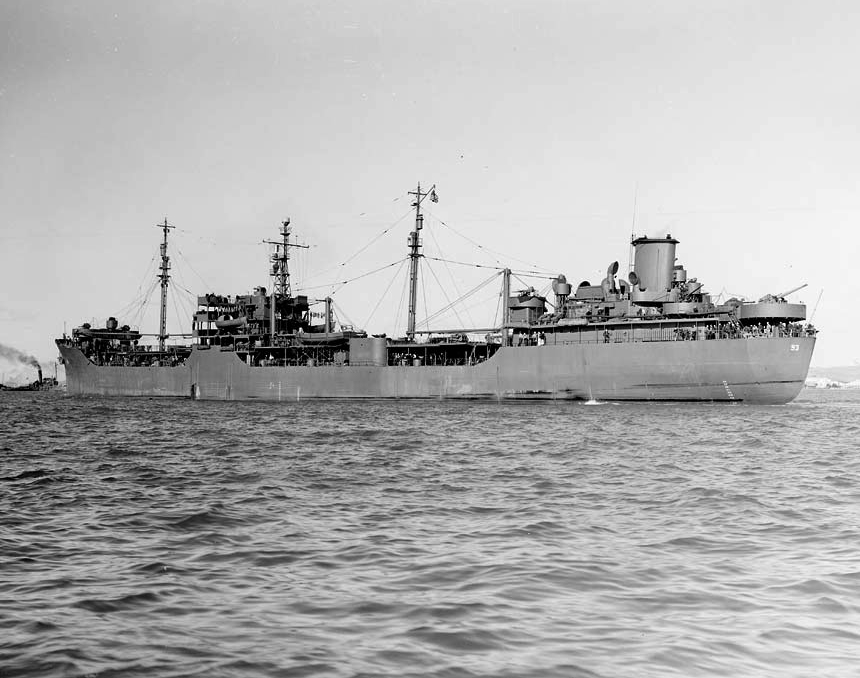
- USS Soubarissen

History

United States
- Name: USS Soubarissen
- Builder: Marinship Corporation, Sausalito, California
- Laid down: 19 June 1944
- Launched: 12 August 1944
- Commissioned: 5 January 1945
- Decommissioned: May 1946
- In service: 19 February 1948
- Out of service: 20 April 1955
- In service: 6 July 1956
- Out of service: 30 December 1958
- Stricken: 1 July 1961
- Identification: IMO number: 5334846
- Honors and awards: 1 battle star (World War II)
- Fate: Disposed of by MARAD, 19 March 1992

General characteristics
- Type: Escambia-class fleet replenishment oiler, later water tanker
- Displacement: 5,782 long tons (5,875 t) light; 21,650 long tons (21,997 t) full
- Length: 523 ft 6 in (159.56 m)
- Beam: 68 ft (21 m)
- Draft: 30 ft 10 in (9.40 m)
- Propulsion: Turbo-electric, single screw
- Speed: 17 knots (31 km/h; 20 mph)
- Complement: 255 officers and enlisted
- Armament: 1 × 5-inch/38-caliber gun; 4 × 3-inch/50-caliber guns; 4 × twin 40 mm AA guns; 4 × twin 20 mm AA guns

USS Soubarissen (AO-93) was an Escambia-class fleet oiler converted to a water tanker, named for a chief of the "Neutral" Indian Nations which, although an Iroquoian-speaking people, were called "neutral" by the French because they took no part in the wars of the Haudenosaunee and Wendat (Hurons). The area he governed included the oil fields of northwestern Pennsylvania and western New York. The knowledge of the oil seepages there was well known among the Indians, and it was declared neutral ground so all Indians could obtain oil for medicinal and domestic purposes without danger or interference. In 1627, Joseph de La Roche Daillon heard of the oil springs and made an expedition to visit them. He was kindly received by Chief Soubarissen, shown the oil seepages, and duly reported his observations to his superiors. These observations contributed largely to the interest in the petroleum resources of the Pennsylvania region.

Soubarissen, was laid down as SS Mission Santa Ana on 19 June 1944 by Marinship Corporation of Sausalito, California as a Maritime Commission type T2-SE-A2 tanker hull with a cargo capacity of 140,000 barrels (22,000 m^{3}), under Maritime Commission contract (MC hull 1828); launched on 12 August 1944; sponsored by Mrs. Andrew F. Carter; acquired by the Navy and commissioned on 5 January 1945.

== Service history ==
=== World War II, 1945–1946 ===
Soubarissen was then converted from a fleet oiler to a water supply ship. On 23 January, she moved to San Pedro, Los Angeles to begin her shakedown cruise. Upon completion of shakedown and yard availability at San Diego she returned to San Pedro to top off fresh water and cargo. She sailed for Hawaii on 1 March and reported at Pearl Harbor on 7 March for duty with the Service Force, Pacific Fleet. She was routed onward to Eniwetok in the Marshall Islands, where, by the 30th, she had discharged over 3 million US gallons (11,000 m^{3}) of water to Navy ships. She then proceeded to Guam in the Mariana Islands to refill her tanks.

Soubarissen sailed for Ulithi, Caroline Islands on 6 April where she was assigned to a task unit that was proceeding to Kerama Retto, Nansei Shoto, arriving on 26 April. She remained there discharging fresh water and fog oil until 17 May when she joined a convoy back to Ulithi. From there she was routed to Manus in the Admiralty Islands. From 24 May to 1 June, she loaded cargo; returned to Ulithi on the 2nd; sailed the next day with a convoy; and was back at Kerama Retto from 7 to 15 June. From that day and through 24 December, she made eight more voyages transporting fresh water between Kerama Retto and Lauaan Bay, Samar in the Philippines. On 25 December 1945 Soubarissen moved to Hong Kong, and operated there until 30 March 1946 when she sailed for Mobile, Alabama via Pearl Harbor and the Panama Canal Zone.

Soubarissen received one battle star for World War II service.

=== In service, 1946–1961 ===
Soubarissen arrived at Mobile on 17 April and was decommissioned and returned to the War Shipping Administration in May 1946. She was reacquired by the Navy on 19 February 1948, delivered to Marine Transport Lines, Inc. to be operated, under contract, for the Navy Transportation Service (MTS) as Soubarissen (AO-93). Control was transferred to the Military Sea Transport Service (MSTS) 1 October 1949 when she was redesignated USNS Soubarissen (T-AO-93). Until 1955 she operated in both the Atlantic and Pacific oceans, calling at ports from Hamburg, Germany to Saudi Arabia and Pusan, Korea. On 20 April 1955 she was returned to the Maritime Administration and berthed at Beaumont, Texas with the National Defense Reserve Fleet.

Soubarissen was returned to the Navy on 6 July 1956 and operated in the Atlantic by MSTS until 30 December 1958 when she was again placed in the Beaumont Reserve Fleet of the Maritime Administration. Her title was transferred to the Maritime Administration on 1 April 1961 and she was struck from the Naval Vessel Register on 1 July 1961.

== Disposal, 1982 ==
Soubarissen remained in the Beaumont Reserve Fleet until she was disposed of by a MARAD vessel exchange on 19 March 1982. She was traded to the Farrell Lines along with three other vessels in exchange for the SS Export Banner. Farrell Lines immediately resold Soubarissen to Echhardt & Co. Marine, who then in turn sold the tanker to Iterresources Inc. for further resale to Brownsville Steel & Salvage, Brownsville, Texas. Soubarissen was delivered to the scrapyard on 5 April 1982 and she was scrapped by 30 July 1982.
