= USS Tamalpais =

Oiler of the United States Navy

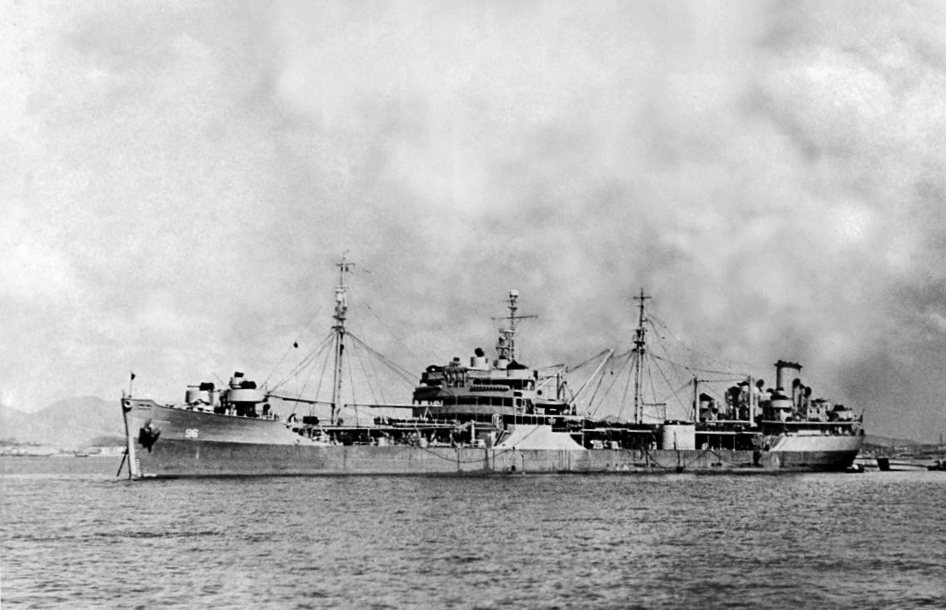
- Tamalpais in 1945

History

United States
- Name: USS Tamalpais
- Namesake: Mount Tamalpais in California
- Builder: Marinship, Sausalito, California
- Laid down: 18 September 1944
- Launched: 29 October 1944
- Commissioned: 20 May 1945
- Decommissioned: 21 June 1946
- Stricken: 8 July 1946
- Acquired: 10 March 1948
- In service: 28 April 1950, as USNS Tamalpais (T-AO-96)
- Out of service: 1958
- Stricken: 18 December 1967
- Fate: Acquired by the US Army, 1966

General characteristics
- Type: Escambia-class replenishment oiler
- Displacement: 5,782 long tons (5,875 t) light; 21,880 long tons (22,231 t) full
- Length: 523 ft 6 in (159.56 m)
- Beam: 68 ft (21 m)
- Draft: 30 ft 10 in (9.40 m)
- Propulsion: Turbo-electric, single screw, 8,000 shp (5,966 kW)
- Speed: 15 knots (28 km/h; 17 mph)
- Capacity: 140,000 barrels (22,000 m^{3})
- Complement: 267
- Armament: 1 × 5"/38 caliber dual purpose gun; 4 × 3"/50 caliber guns; 4 × twin 40 mm guns; 4 × twin 20 mm guns

USS Tamalpais (AO-96) was a Escambia-class replenishment oiler acquired by the United States Navy for use during World War II. She had the dangerous but necessary task of providing fuel to vessels in combat and non-combat areas. She served in the Pacific Ocean Theatre of operations late in the war.

Tamalpais was laid down at Sausalito, California, on 18 September 1944 under United States Maritime Commission contract (MC hull 1831) by the Marinship Corp.; launched on 29 October 1944, sponsored by Mrs. H. B. Anderson, acquired by the Navy on 20 May 1945, and commissioned that same day.

== World War II Pacific Theatre operations ==
The fleet oiler departed San Francisco, California, on 7 June for shakedown training out of San Diego, California. On the 16th, she was ordered to San Pedro, Los Angeles, to load potable water and, eight days later, she headed for the Marshall Islands. On 8 July, Tamalpais reached Eniwetok and discharged her cargo. The following day, she continued on to Manus, in the Admiralty Islands, where she loaded another cargo of water which she delivered to Ulithi on 22 July. She returned to Manus on the 26th. She put to sea again on 8 August, headed for the Philippines with a fresh water cargo, and arrived at Leyte on 10 August.

== End-of-war activity ==
Four days later, as hostilities in the Pacific were ending, she stood out of Leyte Gulf to rendezvous with Task Group 30.8 off the coast of Japan. The ship entered Sagami Bay on the 28th and anchored in Tokyo Bay on the 30th. There, she issued water to hospital ships and small craft. She remained in Japan (either at Tokyo, Yokosuka, or Sasebo) until March 1946.

On 4 March, Tamalpais departed Sasebo for Hong Kong, where she stayed almost two months. On 26 April, she sailed from Hong Kong to return to the United States. She transited the Panama Canal between 22 and 24 May and arrived in Mobile, Alabama, on the 28th. On 21 June 1946, she was decommissioned and returned to the War Shipping Administration for lay up in the National Defense Reserve Fleet. Her name was struck from the Navy List on 8 July 1946.

== Assigned to duty with MSTS ==
On 10 March 1948, Tamalpais was reacquired by the Navy, and she was operated by a civilian contractor for the Navy until 1 October 1949, when she was transferred to the Military Sea Transportation Service for duty as a non-commissioned naval vessel crewed by civilian personnel. On 28 April 1950, her name was reinstated on the Navy list. For the next eight years, she plied the oceans of the world as USNS Tamalpais (T-AO-96), visiting major ports the world over and carrying petroleum for the Navy. On 18 December 1967, her name was again struck from the Navy list; and she was transferred to the Maritime Commission's James River Group, National Defense Reserve Fleet.

== Transferred to the U.S. Army ==
On 3 June 1966, Tamalpais was turned over to the Department of the Army to serve as a floating power station under Project Powerfloat.
