= T2 tanker =

Ship type

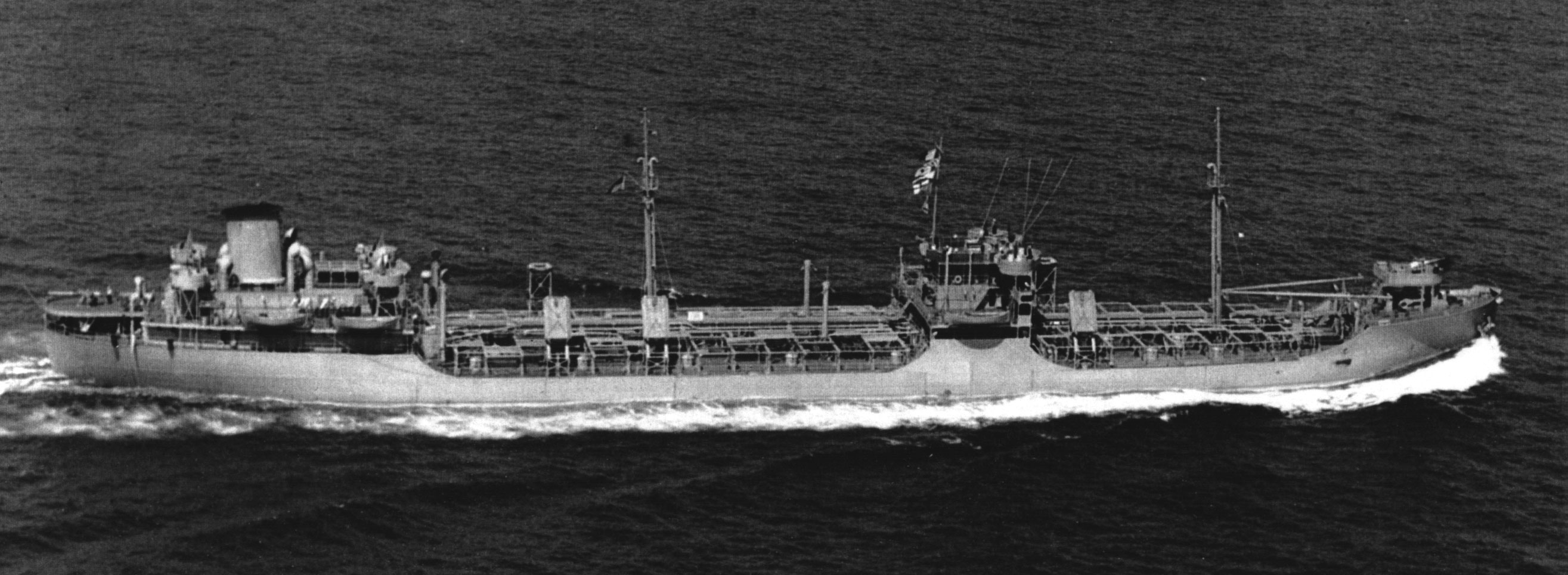
The T2 tanker Hat Creek in August 1943

The T2 tanker, or T2, was a class of oil tanker constructed and produced in large numbers in the United States during World War II. Only the T3 tankers were larger "navy oilers" of the period. Some 533 T2s were built between 1940 and the end of 1945. They were used to transport fuel oil, diesel fuel, gasoline and sometimes black oil-crude oil. After the war, many T2s remained in use, and as with other hastily built World War II ships later converted to peacetime uses, there were safety concerns. The United States Coast Guard Marine Board of Investigation in 1952 found that in cold weather the ships were prone to metal fatigue cracking; in response to this finding, surviving ships were "belted" with steel straps. This occurred after two T2s, Pendleton and Fort Mercer, split in two off Cape Cod within hours of each other. Pendleton's sinking is memorialized in the 2016 film The Finest Hours. Engineering inquiries into the problem suggested the cause was poor welding techniques. It was found that steel that had been successfully used in riveted ship design was not well-suited for the new wartime welding construction. The high sulfur content made the steel brittle and prone to metal fatigue at lower temperatures.

== Designs ==
=== T2 design ===
The T2 design was formalized by the United States Maritime Commission as its medium-sized "National Defense tanker", a ship built for merchant service which could be militarized as a fleet auxiliary in time of war. MarCom subsidized the excess cost of naval features beyond normal commercial standards. The T2 was based on two ships built in 1938–1939 by Bethlehem Steel for Socony-Vacuum Oil Company, Mobilfuel and Mobilube, differing from the Mobil ships principally in the installation of more powerful engines for higher speed. Standard T2s were 501 ft 6 in (152.9 m) in total length, with a beam of 68 ft (20.7 m). Rated at 9,900 tons gross (GRT), with 15,850 long tons deadweight (DWT), standard T2s displaced about 21,100 tons. Steam turbines driving a single propeller at 12,000 horsepower (8,900 kW) delivered a top speed of 16 knots (30 km/h; 18 mph). Six were built for commerce by Bethlehem-Sparrows Point Shipyard in Maryland, only to be taken over by the United States Navy following the Attack on Pearl Harbor as the Kennebec-class oiler.

=== T2-A design ===
Keystone Tankships company ordered five tankers in 1940 from Sun Shipbuilding & Drydock of Chester, Pennsylvania, based on the T2 but longer and with increased capacity; Marcom would designate this design T2-A. Bigger but faster, they were 526 ft (160.3 m) in total length, displaced about 22,445 tons, and were rated at 10,600 tons gross with 16,300 DWT — yet they attained a top speed approaching 16 1/2 knots (30.6 km/h; 19.0 mph). All five were requisitioned by the Navy during the war and converted to fleet oilers as the Mattaponi class.

=== T2-SE-A1 ===
By far the most common variety of the T2-type tanker was the T2-SE-A1, another commercial design already being built in 1940 by the Sun Shipbuilding Company for Standard Oil Company of New Jersey. They were 523 ft (159.4 m) long, 68 ft (20.7 m) abeam, with 10,448 gross register tons (GRT) and 16,613 DWT. Their (steam) turbo-electric transmission system delivered 6,000 shaft horsepower (4,500 kW), with maximum thrust of 7,240 horsepower (5,400 kW), which produced a top-rated speed of about 15 knots (28 km/h; 17 mph) with a cruising range of up to 12,600 miles (20,300 km). After Pearl Harbor, the United States Maritime Commission ordered this model built en masse to supply U.S. warships already in accelerated production, and provide for the fuel needs of US forces in Europe and the Pacific, as well as to replace the tanker tonnage being lost at an alarming rate to German U-boats. 481 were built in extremely short production times by the Alabama Drydock and Shipbuilding Company of Mobile, Alabama, the Kaiser Company at their Swan Island Yard at Portland, Oregon, the Marinship Corp. of Sausalito, California, and the Sun Shipbuilding and Drydock Company of Chester, Pennsylvania. During that period, average production time from laying of the keel to "fitting out" was 70 days. The record, however, was held by Marinship, which had Huntington Hills ready for sea trials in just 33 days.

=== T2-SE-A2 and -A3 ===
The T2-SE-A2 variation, built only by Marinship of Sausalito, was nearly identical to the T2-SE-A1 version, except with 10,000 hp (7,500 kW) rather than 7,240. The A3 variation was essentially an A2 built as a naval oiler from the start, rather than converted later as many A2s were. Two of the A2 ships would be converted to the Pasig-class of distilling ships.

=== T3-S-A1 ===
Despite the confusing T3 designation, the T3-S-A1s built by Bethlehem Sparrows Point for Standard Oil of New Jersey were identical to the original T2s except for having less powerful engines of 7,700 hp (5,700 kW). Twenty-five of this design were ordered by the Maritime Commission, of which five became Navy oilers as the Chiwawa class.

=== T2-A-MC-K ===
T2-A-MC-K had a M.C. deadweight tonnage of 16,300 and a full load tonnage of 22,445. The dimensions were: Length: 526 ft (160 m), Beam: 68 ft (21 m) and max. draft: 30 ft 10 in (9.40 m). Powered by turbine engines rated at 12,000 hp (8,900 kW) with a top speed of 17.5 knots (32.4 km/h; 20.1 mph). The first Navy commissioning was in 1942. could hold 117,400 Bbls of oil and 595,000 gal of gasoline. Crew of 23 officers and 329 enlisted men. Armament: one single 5'/38 cal dual-purpose gun mount, four single 3"/50 cal dual-purpose gun mounts, four twin 40 mm AA gun mounts and twelve single 20 mm AA gun mounts. Example was USS Patuxent, a Kennebec-class oiler.

== Notable deployments ==
In 1966, the US Army reactivated 11 T2 tankers and converted them into floating electrical power generation plants and deployed them to Vietnam. The ships' propulsion systems' electrical turbines were used to generate electricity for on-shore use, drawing on fuel from the ships' 150,000-barrel holds. This allowed the ships to produce electricity for two years without refueling for the Vietnam War. USNS French Creek was the first to arrive in June 1966, then next was USS Kennebago, both installed in Cam Ranh Bay.

== Notable incidents ==
=== Navy service ===
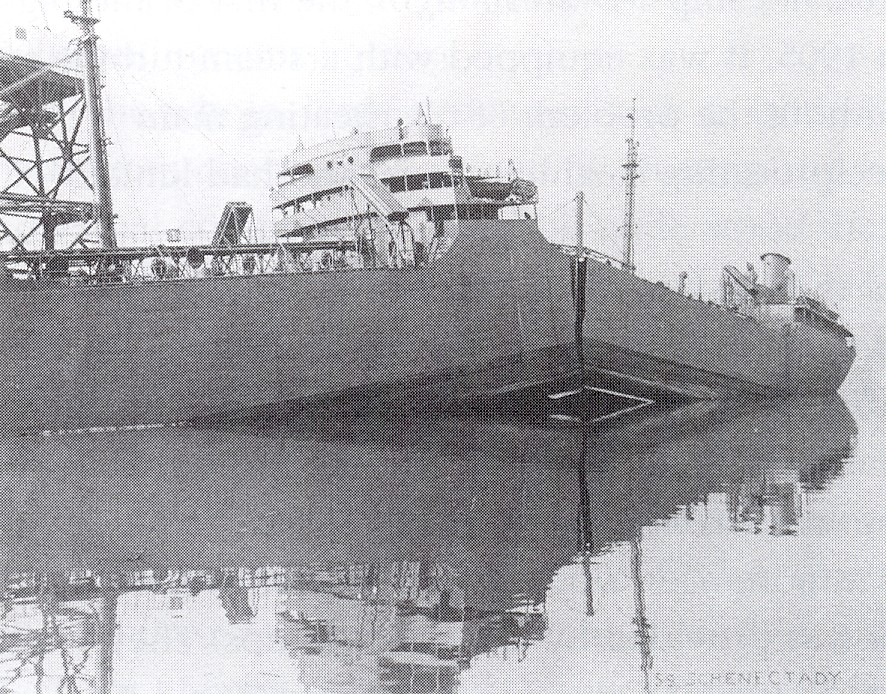
The new T2 tanker Schenectady broke in two at its dock due to brittle metal and bad welding

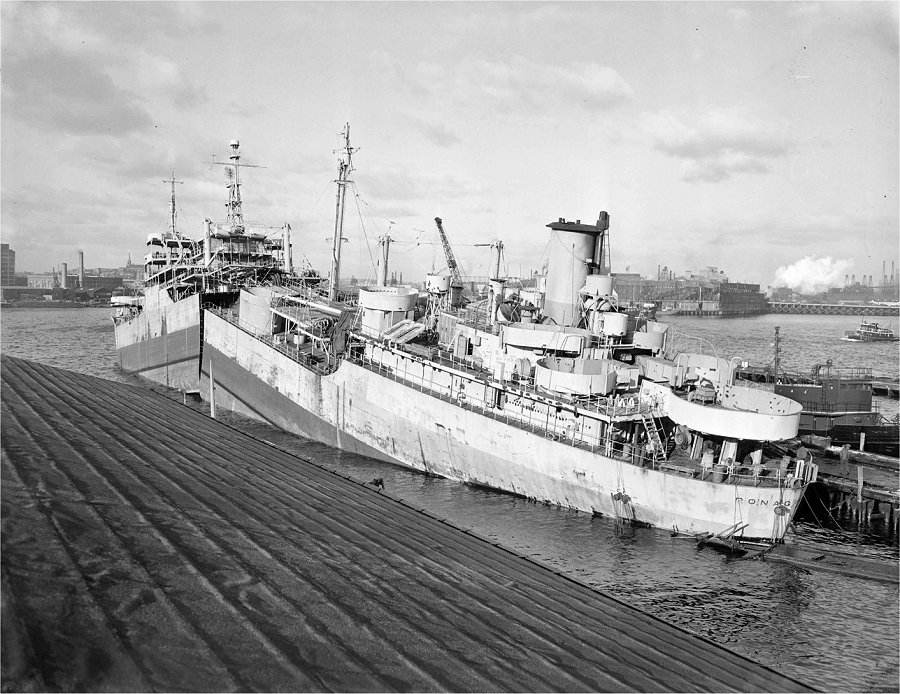
The fractured USS Ponaganset (AO-86), at the General Ship and Iron Works, Boston, MA., 9 December 1947

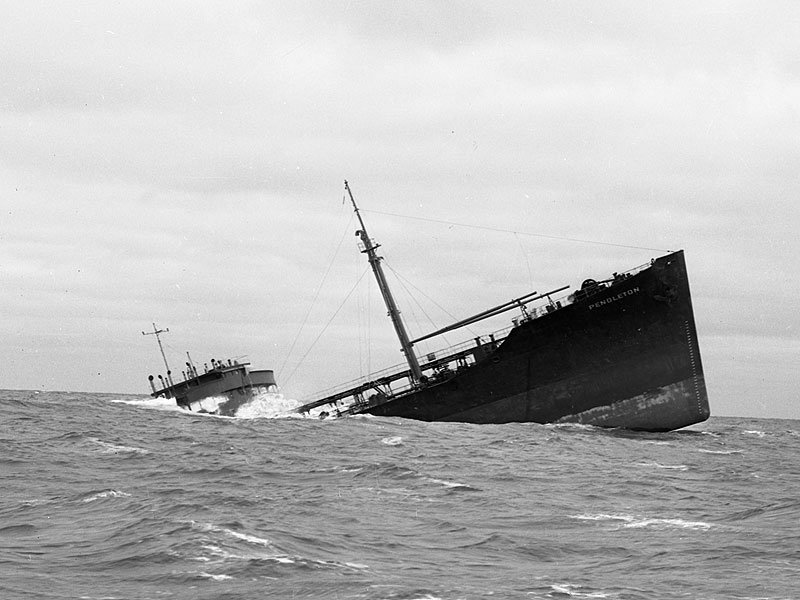
The T2 tanker "Pendleton" bow in 1952

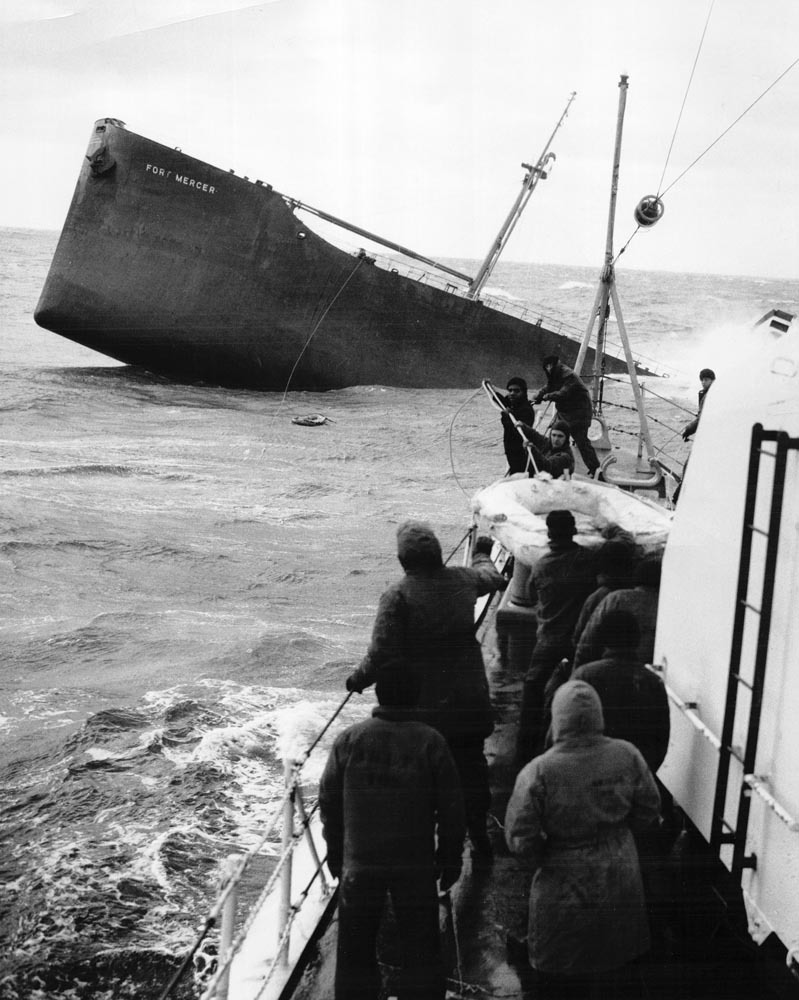
Crew from USCGC Yakutat pull in a life-raft carrying survivors from the bow section of SS Fort Mercer, the photo was taken 20 minutes prior to its sinking 1952

- Schenectady broke in two in 1943. At 11 pm on 16 January 1943, a few days after completing her sea trials, the 501-foot-long T2 tanker Schenectady broke in two amidships while lying at the outfitting dock in the constructors yard in Portland, Oregon. The temperature of the harbor water was about 39 °F (4 °C) and water conditions were still. The air temperature was approximately 26 °F (−3 °C) and winds were light. The hull failure was sudden and accompanied by a report that was heard a mile away. Schenectady, built by a Kaiser Shipyard, was the first catastrophic T2 hull failure, made all the more impressive by the still conditions under which it occurred. The failure of Schenectady initiated on the deck between two bulkheads and ran down to the keel (see photo). A defective weld was present in a region of stress concentration arising at a design detail point. Poor welding procedures were cited by the committee investigating the failure as contributory; however, at that time the metallurgical problems were not fully understood.
- SS Caddo (1942) sank on 23 November 1942 after being hit by a torpedo from the U-boat U-518 in the North Atlantic while en route to Iceland. She had 8 survivors of the 59 men aboard. Also known as SS Dorchester Heights.
- SS Esso Gettysburg sank on 10 June 1943 after being hit by a torpedo from U-66 while 90 miles (140 km) off the Georgia coast. She was bound for Philadelphia with crude oil. She lost 57 of her 72 crew.
- SS Bloody Marsh sank on 2 July 1943 after being hit by a torpedo from U-66. Bloody Marsh was on her maiden voyage and sank 75 miles (121 km) east of Savannah, Georgia. She lost three of her 77 crew.
- US Touchet sank on 3 December 1943 after being hit by a torpedo from U-193. She sank in the Gulf of Mexico while en route to New York from Houston, Texas.
- SS McDowell sank on 16 December 1943 after being hit by a torpedo from U-516 off Cuba.
- SS Fort Lee sank on 2 November 1944 after being hit by a torpedo from U-181 in the Indian Ocean.
- SS Jacksonville sank on 30 August 1944 after being hit by a torpedo off Ireland by U-482. She was in convoy CU 36, en route to Loch Ewe, Scotland.
- USS Ponaganset broke in two, sank at pier in Boston, and was raised and scrapped in 1947.
- SS Nickajack Trail sank on 30 March 1946 in Eniwetok Harbor at Enewetak Atoll on trip from Port Arthur to Yokohama.
- SS Glenn's Ferry sank on 6 October 1945 at Batag Island, Philippines on a trip from Los Angeles to Manila after an explosion.

=== Commercial service ===
- SS Bemis Heights sank on 5 November 1948 off Quoin Point, South Africa on trip from Santos to Abadan.
- SS Pendleton, broke in two on 18 February 1952
- SS Fort Mercer, broke in two on 18 February 1952
- SS Salem Maritime exploded on 17 January 1956 while taking on a load of fuel in Lake Charles, Louisiana. 18 crew members on board were killed, including the oncoming and the retiring Master; as well as 3 personnel ashore when the No. 8 port fuel tank exploded in flames. The Salem Maritime and three tank barges in close proximity and shore installations were severely damaged.
- SS Midway Hills sank 2 October 1961 after she broke in two from an engine room explosion. She sank 110 miles east from Jacksonville, Florida, on a trip from Houston to Perth Amboy, New Jersey.

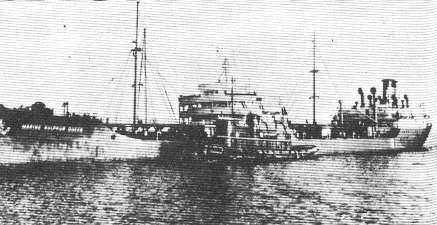
SS Marine Sulphur Queen

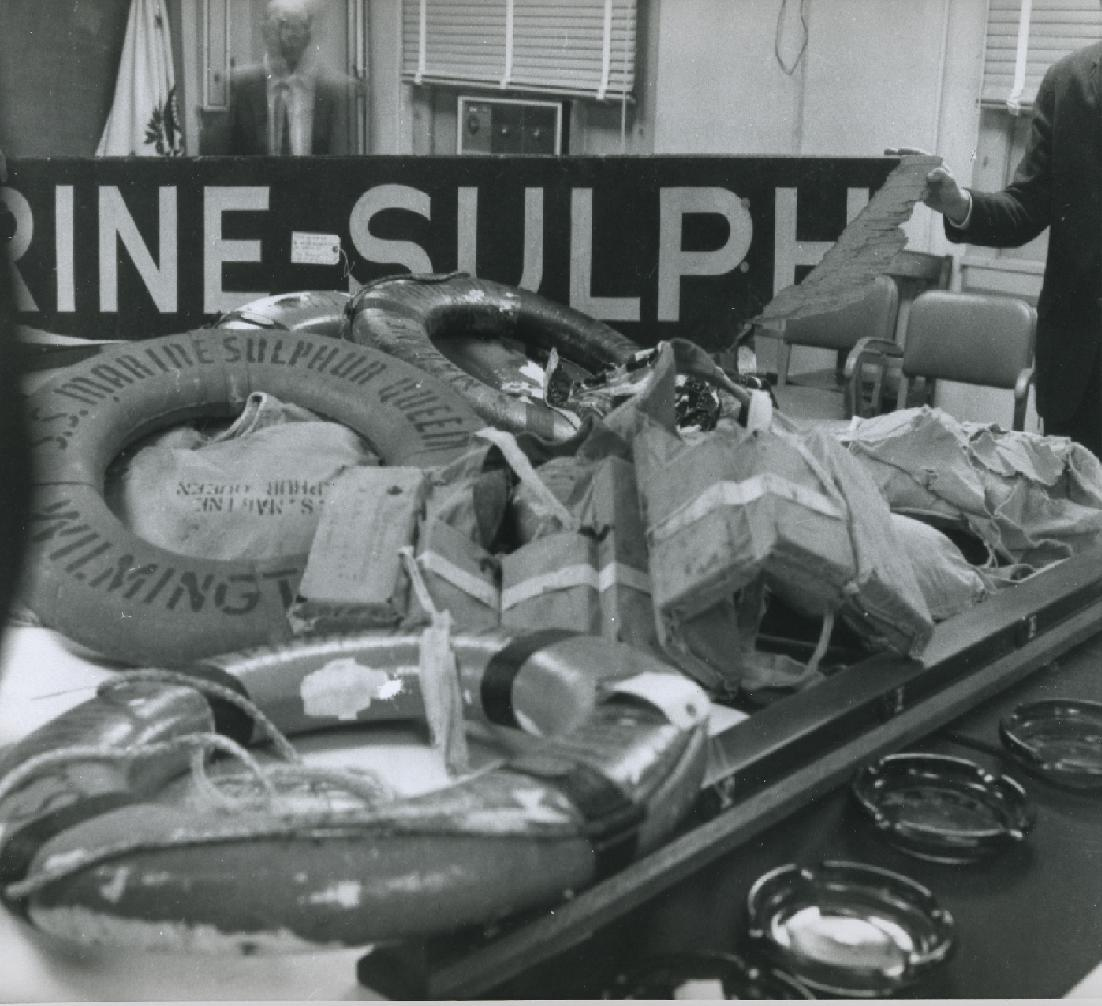
The remains of Marine Sulphur Queen, recovered by the US coast guard

- SS Marine Sulphur Queen and its crew of 39 disappeared near the southern coast of Florida after 4 February 1963.
- SS Bunker Hill sank 6 March 1964 after an explosion, she broke in two near Anacortes, Washington on a trip from Tacoma, Washington to Anacortes.
- SS White Bird Canyon sank on 17 December 1964 with loss of all the crew in bad weather off Ulak Island, Aleutians on trip from Vancouver to Yokohama.
- SS Rainier (T2-SE-A1) built by Swan Island. After World War II was sold to private company in 1948. Was converted to bulk cargo ship on 1962, was wrecked and sank on 22 December 1965 off Faja Grande Lighthouse, Flores, Azores as SS Papadiamandis.
- SS Fort Schuyler (T2-SE-A1) fire started in engine room, then was damaged by explosions and sank on 24 October 1966 off the coast of Morgan City, Louisiana.
- SS Ninety-Six sank on 3 March 1971 after starting to leak in storm in the Indian Ocean, on trip from Bunbury, Western Australia, to Savannah.
- SS Texaco Oklahoma sank on March 27, 1971, after breaking up off Cape Hatteras, North Carolina. (US Coast Guard incident report July 26, 1972)
- SS V. A. Fogg, a T2 tanker, lost 1 February 1972 mistakenly believed to have been lost in the Bermuda Triangle
- SS Capricorn, a T2 that in 1980 collided with USCGC Blackthorn in Tampa Bay Florida
- SS Belridge Hills Sank 24 December 1972 in gale storm 800 miles south of Kodiak on trip from Vancouver to Yokohama.
- SS Marine Floridian, a T2 Tanker that in 1977 collided with a drawbridge in Virginia in a spectacular and costly accident.
- SS Marine Electric, a T2 tanker that sank in a 1983 storm, the investigation of which led to major reforms in ship inspections and safety standards.
- Delta Conveyor sank in the Mississippi River adjacent to Delta Bulk Terminal in Convent, Louisiana. Raised in two sections: the bow in early 2003 and the aft section in late 2003.

== See also ==
- Escambia-class replenishment oiler
- List of Type T2 Tanker names
- Liberty ship
- Type C1 ship
- Type C2 ship
- Type C3 ship
- Type C4 ship
- Type R ship
- United States Merchant Marine Academy
- United States Navy oiler
- Victory ship
