= United States Naval Ship =

US Navy owned ship prefix type

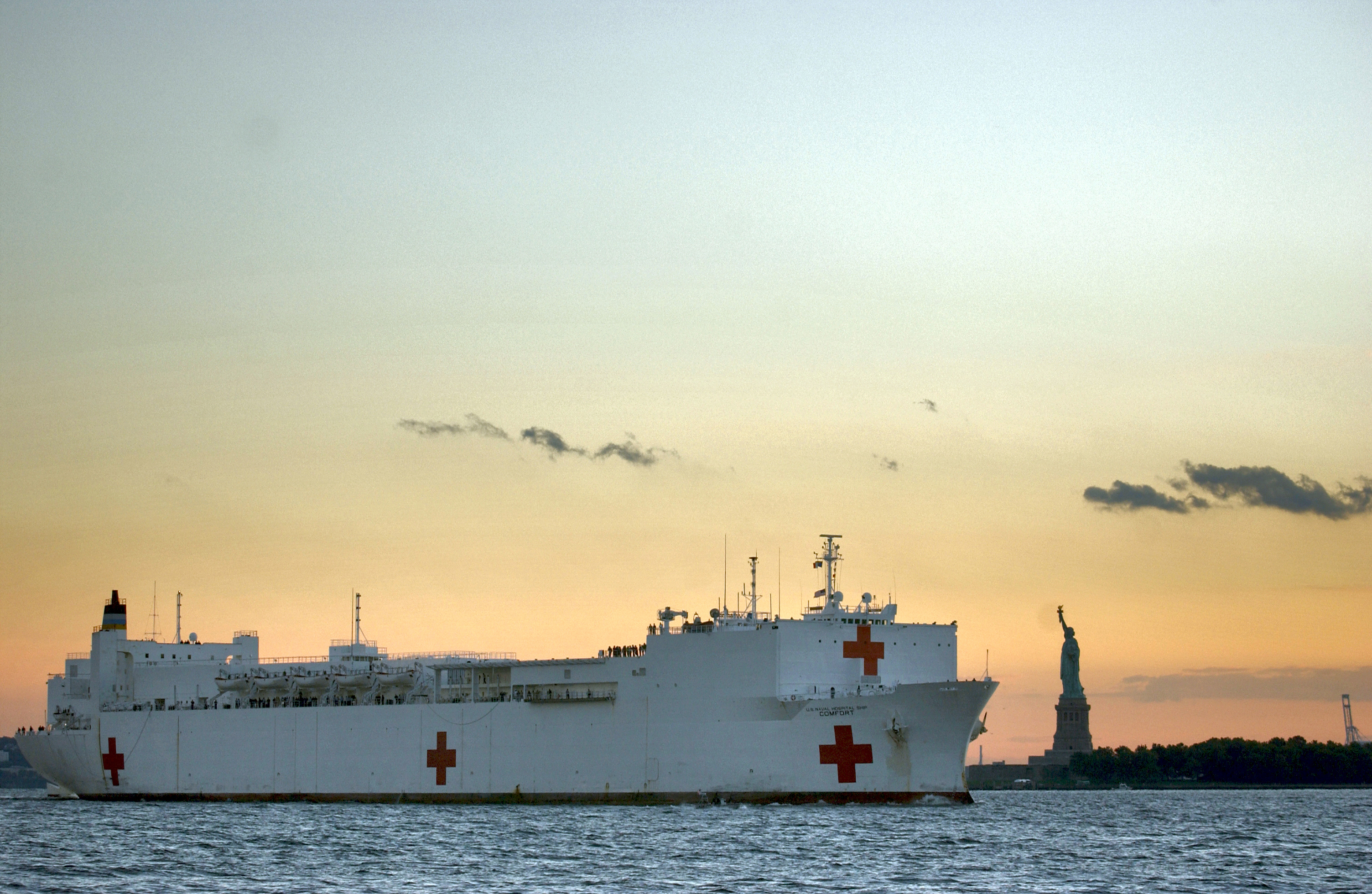
The USNS Comfort (T-AH-20), pictured here on September 15, 2001, is an example of a United States Naval Ship.

United States Naval Ship (USNS) is the prefix designation given to non-commissioned ships that are property of the United States Navy (USN).

== Definition ==
United States Naval Ships are unarmed auxiliary support vessels owned by the U.S. Navy and operated in non-commissioned service by Military Sealift Command with a civilian crew. Some ships include a small military complement to carry out communication and special mission functions, or for force protection.

In comparison, U.S. Navy ships commissioned into military service have the designation "USS", are armed, and are crewed by U.S. Navy personnel. Additionally, the United States Naval Ships hull classification symbol begins with "T-" to denote its civilian crew. The USNS prefix can be assigned only while the ship is owned by the U.S. Navy. If, after being taken out of service, the ship is transferred to the Maritime Administration the prefix reverts to a civilian ship prefix such as the case of SS Comet.

== See also ==
- War Shipping Administration
- United States Merchant Marine
- List of Military Sealift Command ships
- List of United States Navy ships
- Royal Fleet Auxiliary
