= Turbine–electric powertrain =

Propulsion method using hot gas rotor to generate current for traction motors

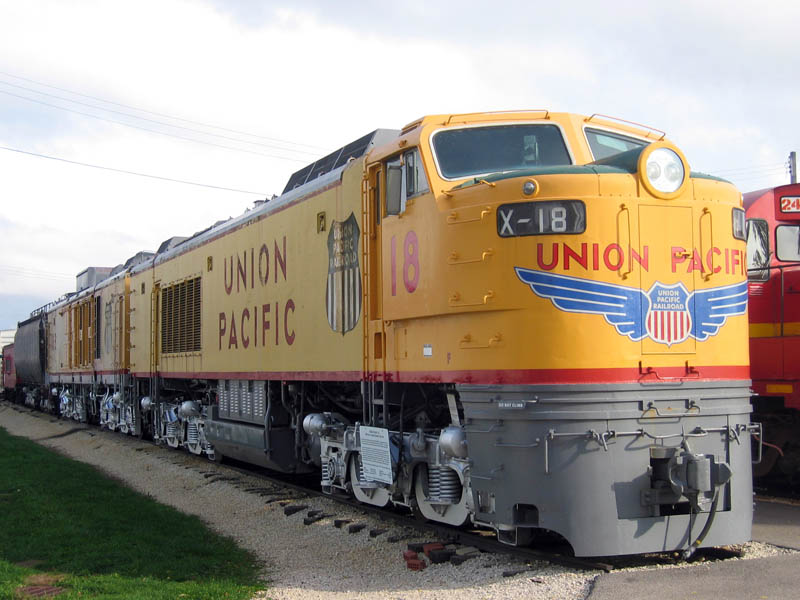
ALCO–General Electric Union Pacific GTELs gas turbine–electric locomotive. Number 18 is one of the third series, built 1958–1961.

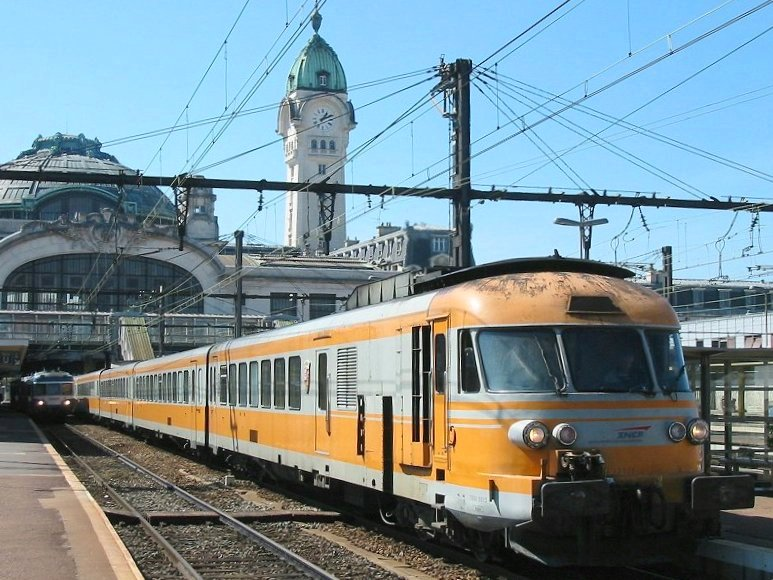
Turbotrains were gas turbine trains built in France 1971–1975 and supplied to SNCF, Amtrak and Iranian Railways.

A turbine–electric transmission, or turbine–electric powertrain, system includes a turboshaft gas turbine connected to an electrical generator, creating electricity that powers electric traction motors. No clutch is required.

Turbine–electric transmissions are used to drive both gas turbine locomotives (rarely) and warships.

== Locomotive applications ==
A handful of experimental locomotives from the 1930s and 1940s used gas turbines as prime movers. These turbines were based on stationary practice, using low-cost heavy-oil bunker fuel, with single large reverse-flow combustors and heat exchangers. In the 1960s the idea re-emerged, using developments in light-weight engines developed for helicopters and using lighter kerosene fuels. As these turbines were compact and lightweight, the vehicles were produced as railcars rather than separate locomotives.

== Naval applications ==
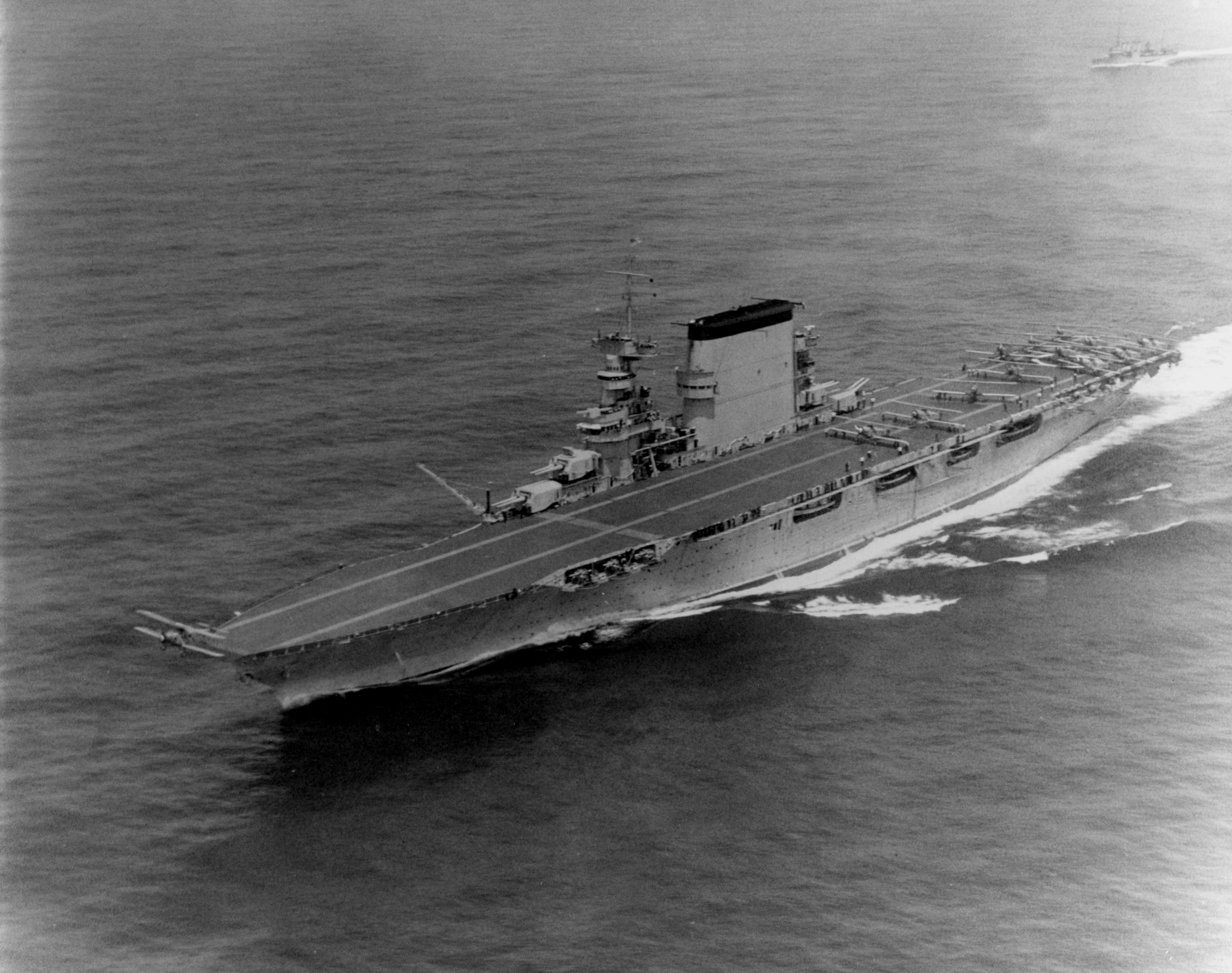
The USS Lexington (CV-2) is an example of a ship using turboelectric propulsion.

Turboelectric powertrains are a subset of what is referred to in marine nomenclature as integrated electric propulsion, or IEP, where generated power is converted into electricity before being used to power propellers or pump-jets. Power can be provided by diesel engines, nuclear reactors, or gas turbines in which case it is called turboelectric propulsion.

As gas and steam turbines are most efficient at thousands of revolutions per minute, when lower turbine speeds are needed in purely mechanical systems this necessitates extensive, and often heavy, reduction gearing. This is especially important on warships as they often require high electrical power independent of travel speed as well as the ability to perform efficient low-speed cruise whilst maintaining the ability to perform less-efficient sprints. For that reason warships often use combined power systems in which efficient prime movers, such as diesel engines or small gas turbines, are used for cruising while large gas turbines can be activated for high speed. When such systems use gearboxes and clutches to accomplish mechanical combinations of power they are referred to as CODOG (combined diesel or gas) or COGAG (combined gas and gas), respectively. This further increases the complexity and size of the mechanical power transmission systems.

Integrated electric propulsion systems offer the ability to simplify such systems by combining power electrically instead of mechanically. By discarding mechanical power transmission these systems can improve efficiency by allowing each system to operate at its most efficient speed, improve reliability by cutting down on the number of components, and simplify ship layout as without the need for direct mechanical linkages to the propellers engines can be placed optimally. And while turboelectric systems are often heavy compared to simple mechanical systems, they are similar in weight to the complex mechanical systems used to link different engines whilst generating electrical power.

An extension of the standard turboelectric propulsion scheme is combined gas–electric and steam, or COGES. In COGES a gas-turbine–electric primary transmission is used with a heat-recovery boiler in the exhaust flow to generate steam that drives a steam turbine that also generates electricity. Thus the system is thus even more efficient, as it converts what would otherwise be rejected as waste heat into useful power.

== See also ==
- Diesel–electric powertrain
- Gas turbine
- Gas turbine–electric locomotive
- Integrated electric propulsion
- Turbine
- Turboshaft
