= Marinship =

Shipyard in Sausalito, California, United States

Coordinates: 37°51′47.6″N 122°29′35.8″W

Marinship Corporation
- Industry: Shipbuilding
- Founded: 1942
- Founder: Kenneth K. Bechtel
- Defunct: 1945
- Fate: Dissolved
- Headquarters: Sausalito, California, U.S.
- Products: Liberty ships T2 tankers Fleet oilers
- Number of employees: 20,000 (1945)
- Parent: W.A. Bechtel Company

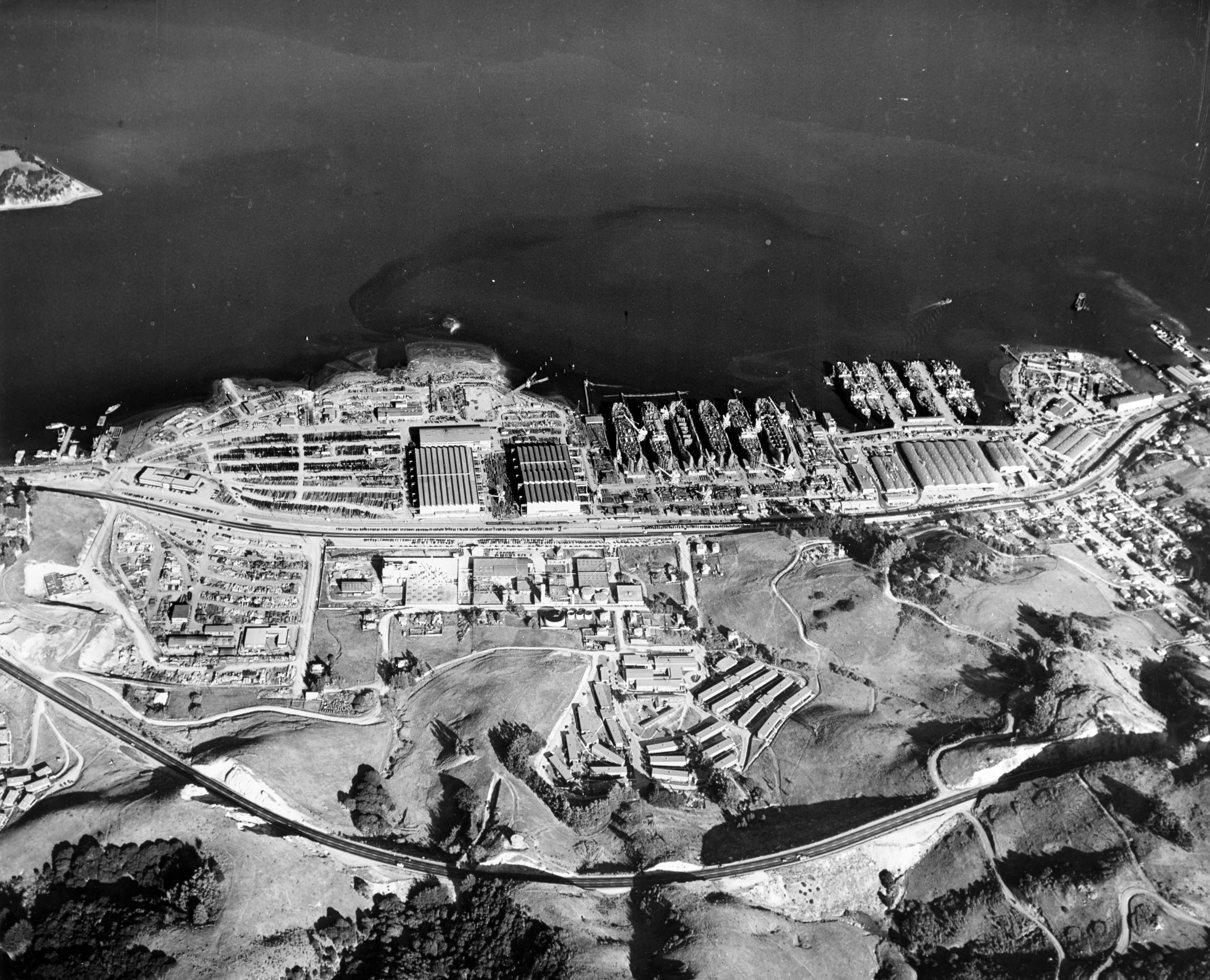
Marinship in 1943

Marinship Corporation was a shipbuilding company of the United States during World War II, created to build the shipping required for the war effort. Founded in 1942, the shipyard built 93 cargo ships and oil tankers, before ending operations in 1945.

== Wartime demand for more ships ==
In early 1942, the demands of World War II resulted in a requirement for greatly increased shipbuilding capacity.

To meet this demand, the US shipbuilder W.A. Bechtel Co. decided to build a shipyard at a former Northwestern Pacific Railroad repair yard situated at Richardson's Bay in Marin County, at the north end of Sausalito, California and just three miles (5 km) north of the Golden Gate Bridge. The site was chosen because the shoreline in the vicinity of the proposed shipyard was relatively uncluttered, unlike much of the rest of San Francisco Bay or other major Pacific ports. It had no official name while it was being built but was referred to as the "Marin Shipbuilding Division of W.A. Bechtel Company" and that lengthy title was shortened to Marin-Ship or what known today as "Marinship" with a street in Sausalito named Marinship Way.

Six ship launching ways were planned, but the old repair yard, purchased from Southern Pacific Railroad, and located at the base of Spring Street, was found to have inadequate space to accommodate this need. The loss of some ships in the Pacific by the Navy triggered the emergency need for even more ships by their customer the Maritime Commission. Using this as their legal reason, the new company took government war powers condemnation actions against local property owners, in order to add the additional land they needed to expand the shipyard.

With only two weeks notice, the many residents of Pine Point, a picturesque knoll located along the edge of the bay, were forcibly evicted by 28 March 1942. About 42 homes and buildings were removed. At least 12 homes avoided demolition by being rapidly moved elsewhere in Sausalito before the rest were razed and Pine Point was dynamited. Records show that an estimated 838,763 cubic yards (641,280 m^{3}) of earth and rock were excavated from Pine Point, Waldo Point and nearby areas. The resulting fill was spread using heavy equipment across the shoreline and tidal mudflats to create new land on which the various buildings of the shipyard were rapidly constructed. Some of these buildings are still in use today, including the Industrial Center Building (ICB) at 480 Gate Five Road (originally the Yard Office and Mold Loft Building) and the Schoonmaker Building at 10 Libertyship Way (originally the General Shop).

== Building the shipyard ==
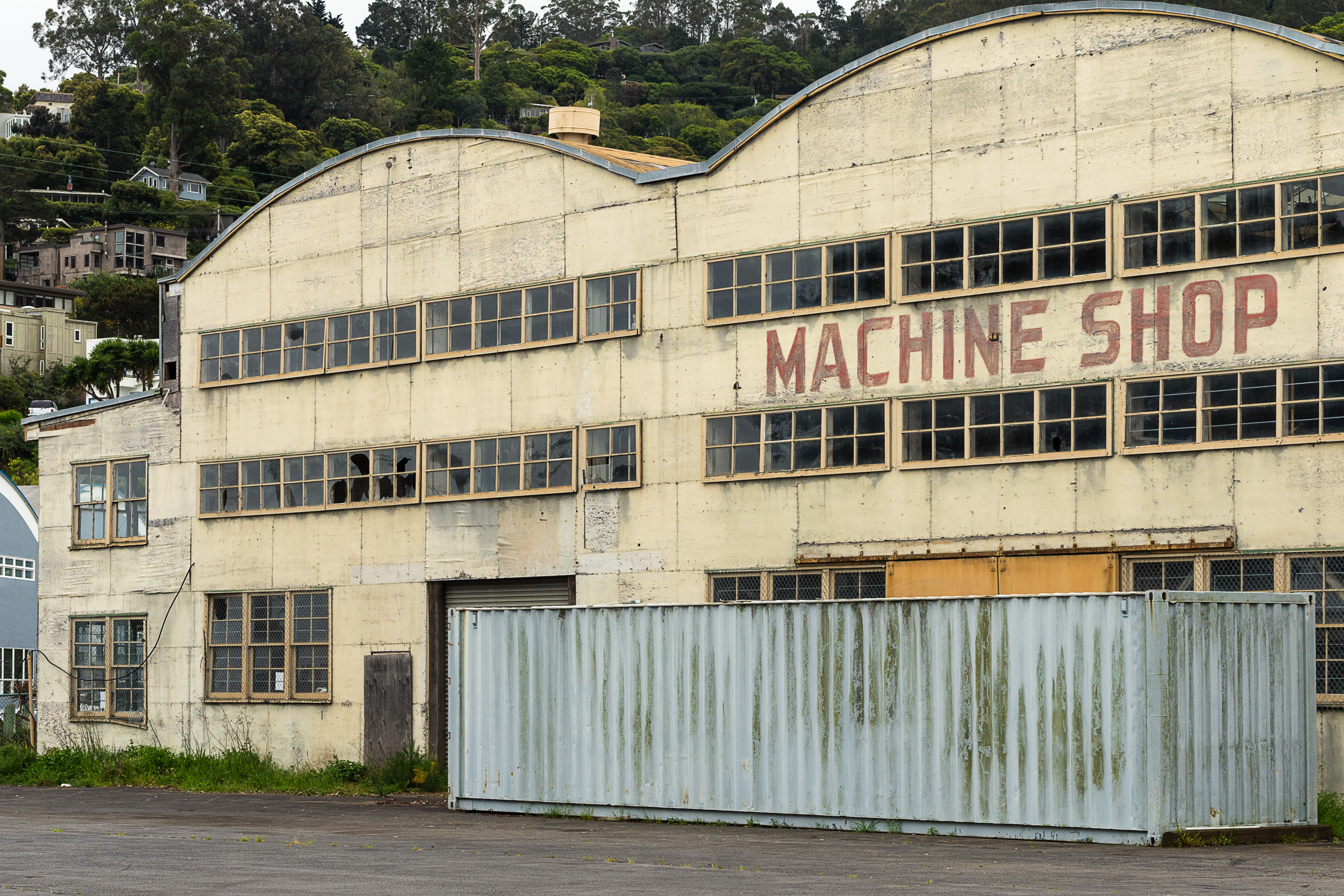
Former Marinship Machine Shop in Sausalito. In 1950, the building was converted to a geotechnical testing laboratory. The lab closed in 1997 and the U.S. Department of Veterans Affairs acquired the 27,500-square-foot structure in 2006. It has been dormant since.

To accomplish the rapid construction of the 210-acre (0.85 km^{2}) shipyard, 2,000 workers worked in shifts around the clock. Approximately 26,000 pilings were driven into the bay mud to create the shipways and to support the new warehouses and fabrication workshops. A 300-foot (91 m) wide by 1.5-mile (2.4 km) long deepwater ship channel was dredged in Richardson Bay to allow the newly launched vessels to reach the main portion of San Francisco Bay. Creating this channel required the removal of 3,000,000 cubic yards (2,300,000 m^{3}) of bay mud.

In a related effort, the creation of Marin City, adjacent to the north end of the shipyard and just across Highway 1, was brought about by the need for the rapid construction of guest worker housing. Housing for 6,000 was created in Marin City, along with supporting schools, stores and churches. Workers eager to take advantage of the well-paying wartime jobs, flocked to the West Coast from all over the United States to work at the various shipyards, including Marinship.

== Shipbuilding ==
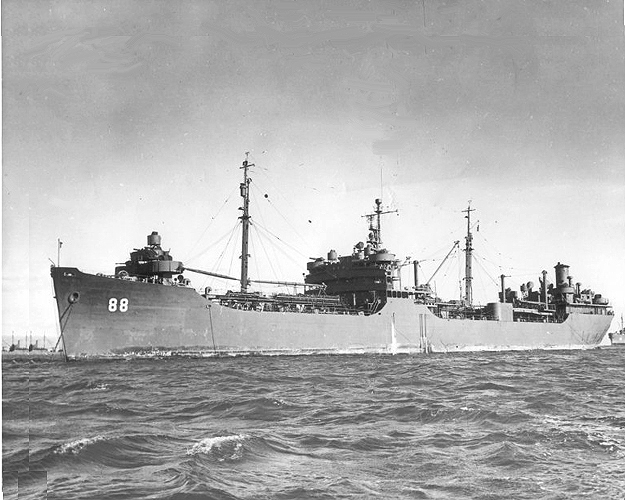
SS Tomahawk (AO-88) - a type T2-SE-A2 fleet oiler built at Marinship, Sausalito (1943-1944)

After only three months from the onset of construction on the shipyard, the first ship keel was laid for the Liberty ship William A. Richardson on 27 June 1942.

Five Liberty ships had been launched from Marinship by the first anniversary of the declaration of war. The Liberty ship, designed as an "emergency" type cargo ship, was 441 feet (134 m) long and 56 feet (17 m) abeam. President Roosevelt nicknamed them his "ugly ducklings." After 15 Liberty ships were launched at Marinship, the shipyard was retooled to produce the larger T2-SE-A2 tankers, which were 523.5 feet (159.6 m) long, and 68 feet (21 m) abeam. On 16 June 1945, Marinship set a world record by constructing and delivering the tanker SS Huntington Hills in a mere 33 days, with 28 days on the way and 5 days of fitting out after launch. At its peak, 20,000 workers were employed at Marinship. In the 3½ years that Marinship was active, it launched 15 Liberty ships, 16 fleet oilers, and 62 tankers — a total of 93 ships.

The Marinship Shipyards were the site of incidents that provided a key early milestone in the civil rights movement. In 1944 in the case of James v. Marinship the California Supreme Court held that African Americans could not be excluded from jobs based on their race, even if the employer took no discriminatory actions. In the case of Joseph James, on whose behalf the suit was brought, the local Boilermakers Union excluded Blacks from membership and had a "closed shop" contract, forbidding the shipbuilder from employing anyone who was not a member of the union. African American workers could join an auxiliary of the union, which offered access to fewer jobs at lower pay. Future US Supreme Court justice Thurgood Marshall successfully argued the case, winning a ruling that the union be required to offer equal membership to African Americans. The matter was finally resolved by the Supreme Court in 1945, finding that it was “readily apparent that the membership offered to Negroes is discriminatory and unequal.” The Court extended the ruling to apply explicitly to all unions and all workers in California.

== After World War II ==
After the end of World War II the shipyards were decommissioned almost as rapidly as they had been built, taking with them almost all of the jobs that so many had moved to the Bay Area to take during the war. This especially impacted the African-American Community. Marinship closed in May 1946. As the War came to an end, black employment also decreased. In July 1945, 20,000 African-American Marinship workers were employed. By September 1945, that number was reduced to 12,000 and by Marinship’s closing, there were almost none. Due to unemployment, racial animosity, redlining, and covenants on title, many African Americans were barred from housing in adjacent white communities and settled in Marin City. With Blacks and other people of color being effectively barred from Sausalito, the Marinship area subsequently became home to an enlarged beatnik Sausalito houseboat community.

In June 1985, Sausalito Measure B, the “Fair Traffic Initiative” or “Ordinance 1022” restricted density in Marinship and prohibited changes that could result in “increased commercial usage or density.”

== See also ==
- Kaiser Shipyards
- Rosie the Riveter/World War II Home Front National Historical Park
- California during World War II
- Maritime history of California
- Sausalito Shipbuilding
- Madden and Lewis Company
