= List of United States Navy oilers =

Ships of the United States Navy

Ships in current service
- Current ships

Ships grouped alphabetically
- A–B; C; D–F; G–H; I–K; L; M; N–O; P; Q–R; S; T–V; W–Z

Ships grouped by type
- Aircraft carriers; Airships; Amphibious warfare ships; Auxiliaries; Battlecruisers; Battleships; Cruisers; Destroyers; Destroyer escorts; Destroyer leaders; Escort carriers; Frigates; Hospital ships; Littoral combat ships; Mine warfare vessels; Monitors; Oilers; Patrol vessels; Registered civilian vessels; Sailing frigates; Steam frigates; Steam gunboats; Ships of the line; Sloops of war; Submarines; Torpedo boats; Torpedo retrievers; Unclassified miscellaneous; Yard and district craft

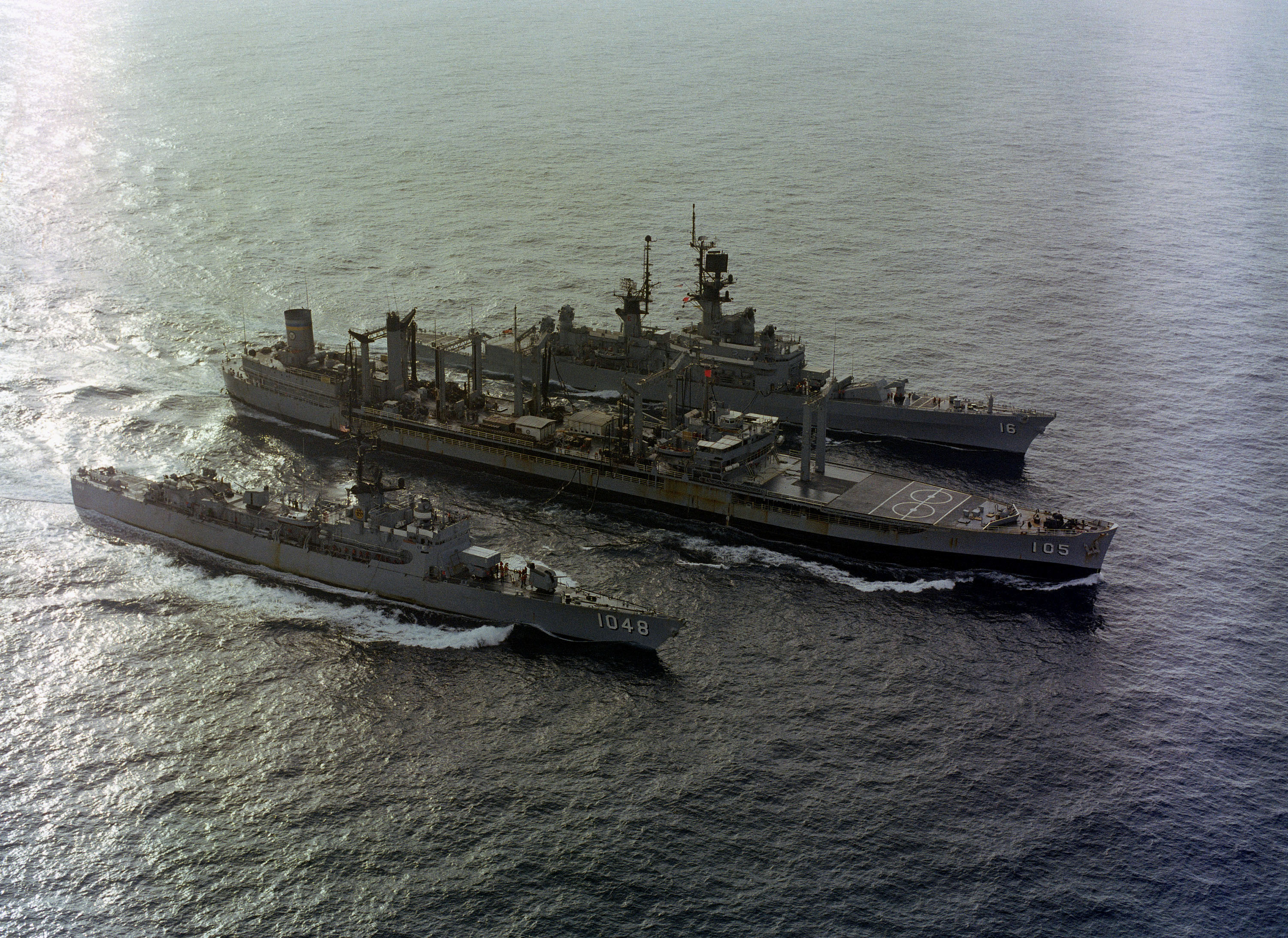
USNS Mispillion (T-AO-105) conducting an underway replenishment.

The following is a list of United States Navy oilers (hull designations AO, AOE, AOL, AOR and AOT). It does not include gasoline tankers (AOG) or submarine oilers (AOSS).

Oilers are considered to be auxiliaries by the US Navy, and this article's lists are thus a subset of this type of ship. All other auxiliaries can be found at List of auxiliaries of the United States Navy, including the gasoline tankers. Tankers commissioned into the Navy for bulk storage at mobile bases by Service Squadrons during World War II were not classed as auxiliaries but as unclassified miscellaneous vessels (IX).

Ship status is indicated as either currently active [A] (including ready reserve), inactive [I], or precommissioning [P] (though United States Naval Ships - USNS - are not commissioned). Ships in the inactive category include only ships in the inactive reserve, ships which have been disposed from US service have no listed status. Ships in the precommissioning category include ships under construction or on order.

Note: tonnages are given in naval light/full load displacement

== Historical overview ==
Coaling was the principal means of fueling steam-powered warships and auxiliaries until about 1914, when fuel oil began to be introduced due to improved ease of refueling, range, and crew morale. The earliest ships on these lists were added to the fleet about this time.

Experiments beginning in 1917 showed that underway replenishment of fuel was possible. The US Navy made extensive use of the technique in World War II, and continued to refine the technology after the war.

During the naval build-up for World War II US Maritime Commission (MarCom) standard T2 and T3 tankers were converted to US Navy oilers (AO)s.

Following World War II larger ships were needed to replenish supercarriers. New oiler types (AORs) were developed to replenish carriers with ordnance and stores in addition to oil so as to minimize replenishment steaming time. Another step in this direction was to build high speed oilers (AOEs) that could match the speed of carriers and other warships.

The latest oilers have been designed to reduce operating costs by reducing manning requirements (a trend begun in 1949 with the introduction of manning non-commissioned ships with civilian crews under the Military Sealift Command and its predecessors - such ships carry the 'T-' prefix on their hull symbols and the USNS prefix rather than USS; ships with SS prefixes are under long-term charter with the Navy rather than under Navy ownership). Another design goal has been to reduce environmental risk of fuel spillage via the introduction of double-hulls.

In 2020 the Navy began to develop a new type of ship, the Light Replenishment Oiler (AOL).

=== Naming of Oilers ===
U.S. Navy Fleet Oilers (AO)s were traditionally named for rivers and streams with Native American names: USS Neosho, Monongahela, Neches, etc. The largest World War II ships were named after California Missions: USS Mission Buenaventura, etc. The ships of the two most recent classes were named for noted ship designers and builders and civil rights leaders: USS Henry J. Kaiser, John Lewis, etc., with a handful of traditional river names included.

For the Fast Combat Support Ships (AOE)s, the names of cities (traditionally cruiser names) were used for the first ships: USS Detroit, Camden, etc. Later ships received the names of supply ships of years gone by: Supply, Arctic, etc.

For the Fleet Replenishment Oilers (AOR)s, which were similar to the AOEs but with less capabilities, city/river pairs with Native American names were used: USS Kalamazoo, Wichita, Savannah, Wabash, Roanoke, etc.

The Transport Oilers (AOT)s were often reclassified AOs and so they retained their original names. Some latter ships were named using civil merchant ship conventions.

== Fleet Oilers (AO) ==
=== Arethusa ===
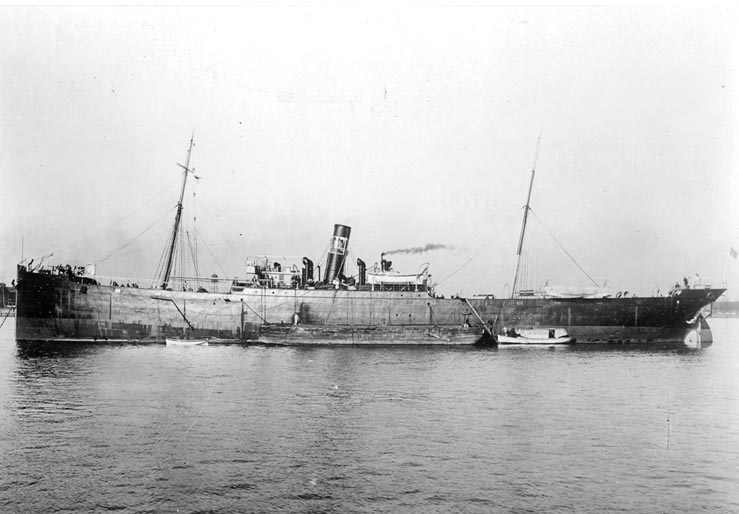

Arethusa was built in Britain 1893 as the SS Luciline and was purchased in 1898, serving originally as a water carrier. In 1910 she was converted to carry fuel oil, mostly in support of destroyers: she thus became the US Navy's first oiler. With the new hull designation system of 1920 she was redesignated AO-7.

- Arethusa (AO-7)

=== Kanawha class ===
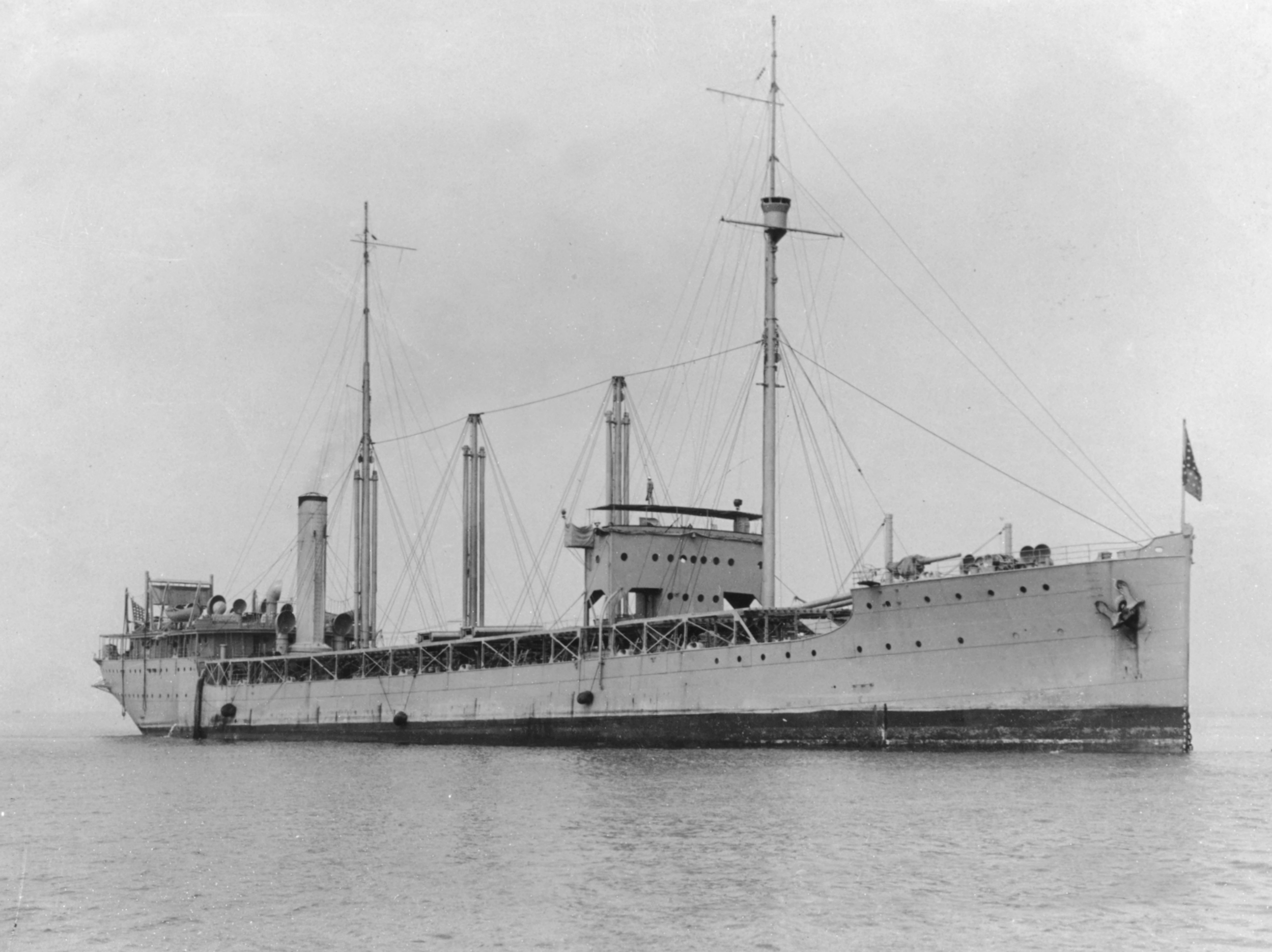
USS Kanawha (AO-1)

The Navy's first fuel ships designed and built as oilers, rather than colliers, the Kanawha-class comprised two ships commissioned just before World War I, which displaced 5,950/14,800 tons. Until 1920 they were designated "Fuel Ship No. 13" etc. Maumee was the first large US Navy vessel with diesel engines. In 1917 Maumee also became the first ship in the world to refuel others while underway in wartime conditions, and the first to do so in rough seas, having been positioned in the mid-Atlantic to aid the crossing of short-legged US destroyers to Britain under the supervision of her Chief Engineer, Lt. Chester W. Nimitz.

- Kanawha (AO-1) (Fuel Ship No. 13), sunk at Tulagi 8 April 1943, 19 killed
- Maumee (AO-2) (Fuel Ship No. 14), later AG-124

=== Sara Thompson and Robert L. Barnes ===
Wartime acquisitions of civilian tankers. Sara Thompson, 2690/5840 tons, was also British-built, in 1888 as the SS Gut Heil, and was purchased in 1917. Robert L. Barnes, a 1630/3850-ton Great Lakes tanker, was built in 1914 and purchased in 1918. With the advent of the Navy's new hull-numbering system in 1920 they were designated AO-8 and AO-14.

- Sara Thompson (AO-8), ex-ID-3148, later SS Sarangani, captured at Manila 1941 and renamed Sanraku Maru; sunk by USS Trout off Borneo, 1943
- Robert L. Barnes (AO-14), ex-ID-3088, ex-AK-11, later AG-27, captured at Guam 1941; later SS Fortune and M.T.S. #2

=== Cuyama class ===
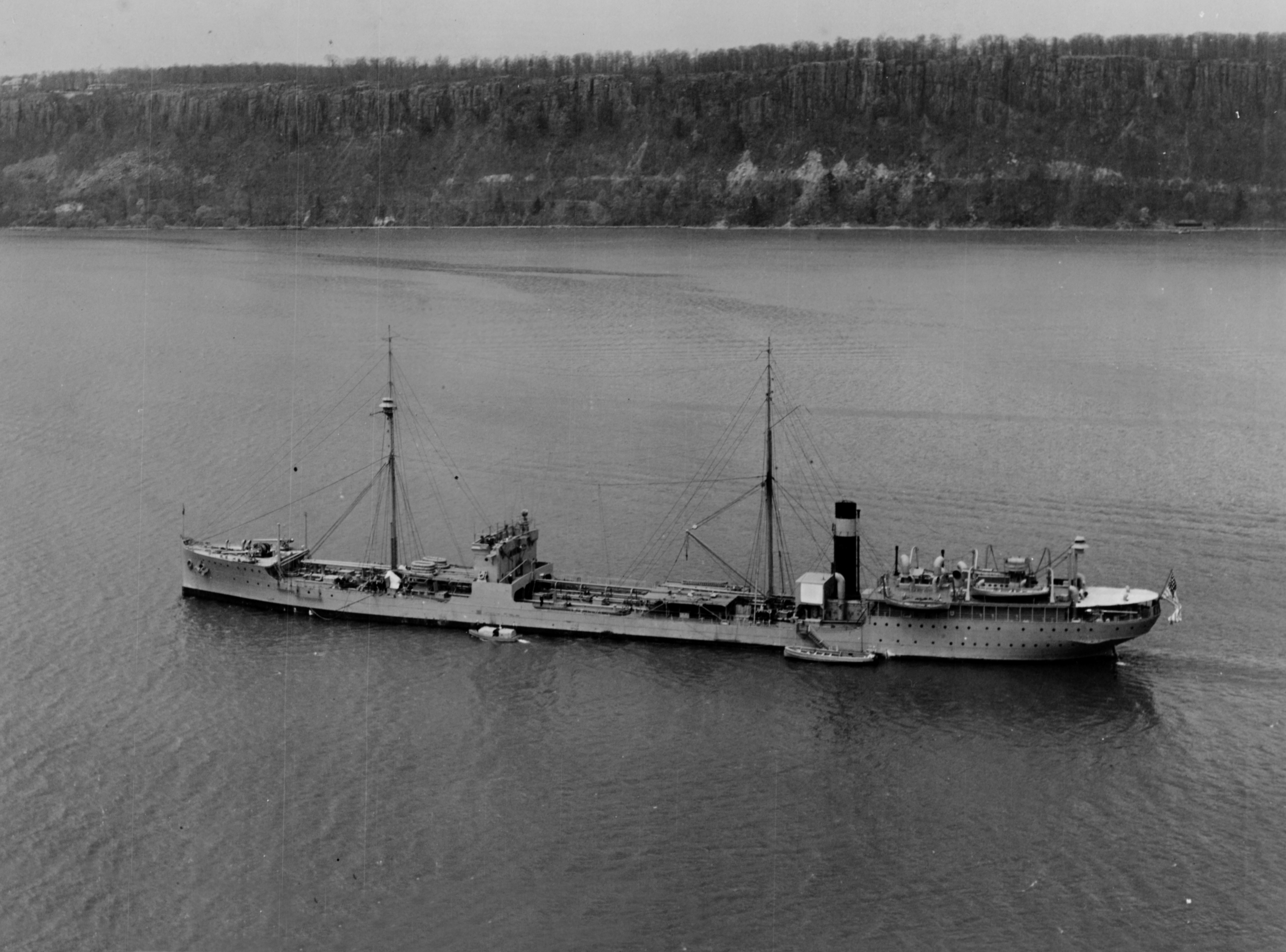
USS Cuyama (AO-3)

The Cuyama-class ships were improved Kanawha-class ships, displacing 5,723/14,500 tons and with the bridge moved to the midships position, which entered service during World War I. Cuyama was the first oiler to refuel a large ship underway by the broadside method, the cruiser Omaha in 1924. Unlike the succeeding Patoka/Alameda group, the Kanawha and Cuyama-classes moderate 14-knot speed made them useful in the early days of World War II. Two of these oilers were lost to Japanese action.

- Cuyama (AO-3) (Fuel Ship No. 15)
- Brazos (AO-4) (Fuel Ship No. 16)
- Neches (AO-5) (Fuel Ship No. 17), sunk off Hawaii 23 January 1942, 57 killed
- Pecos (AO-6) (Fuel Ship No. 18), sunk off Christmas Island 1 March 1942, more than 400 killed (including survivors of the USS Langley sinking)

=== Patoka class ===
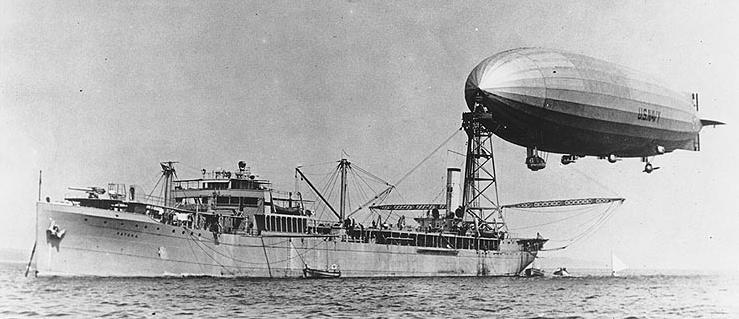
USS Patoka (AO-9)

In 1917 the US Navy ordered twelve tankers, eight of them Patoka-class oilers of 5,422/16,800 tons displacement designed and built by Newport News Shipbuilding. Completed just after the war, the Patoka-class ships, at 10.5 knots, were too slow to be effective fleet oilers, and for the most part served as transport tankers (although Tippecanoe was pressed into service as a fleet oiler during the desperate days of early 1942).

- Patoka (AO-9), later AV-6 and AG-125. Patoka served as tender for the airships USS Los Angeles (ZR-3) and USS Shenandoah (ZR-1).
- Sapelo (AO-11)
- Ramapo (AO-12). Ramapo encountered the highest reliably measured waves in history, 112 feet.
- Trinity (AO-13)
- Rapidan (AO-18)
- Salinas (AO-19), torpedoed but survived 1941
- Sepulga (AO-20)
- Tippecanoe (AO-21)

=== Kaweah class and Alameda ===
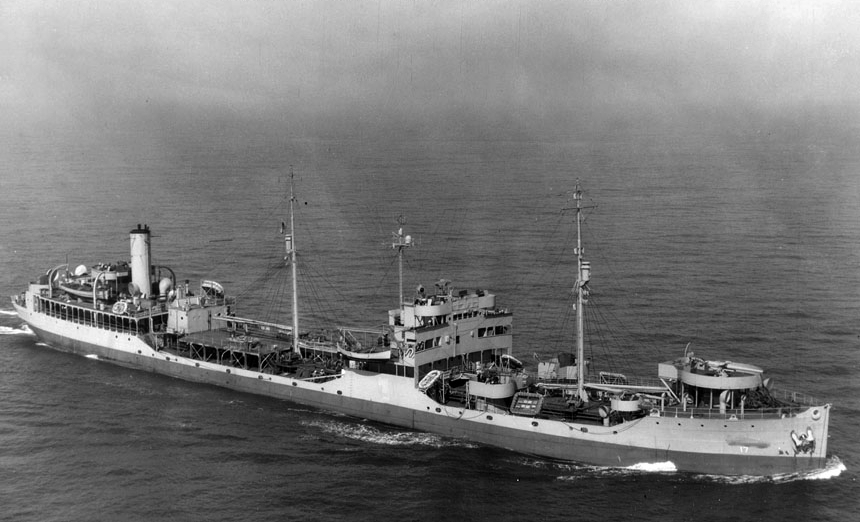
USS Mattole (AO-17)

These were the remaining four 1917 program oilers, 5450/14,500-ton tankers built to United States Shipping Board (USSB) Design 1128 between 1919 and 1921 by William Cramp & Sons, Philadelphia. Similar in size and speed to the Patoka,-class, the Alameda-class also served principally as transport tankers.

- Alameda (AO-10), later SS Olean, SS Sweep and USS Silver Cloud (IX-43)
- Kaweah (AO-15)
- Laramie (AO-16), torpedoed but survived 1942
- Mattole (AO-17)

=== Cimarron class (1939) ===
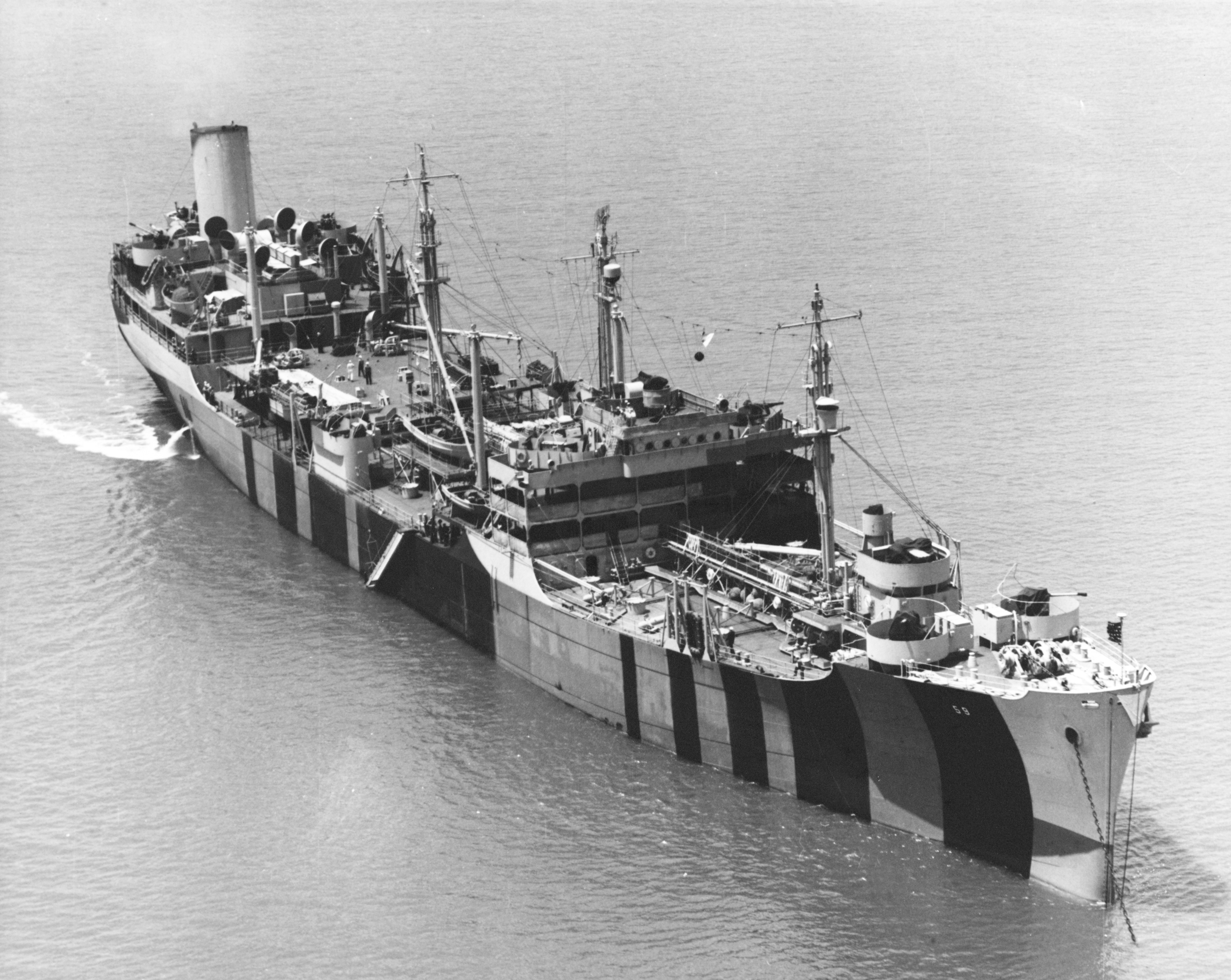
USS Mississinewa (AO-59)

The Cimarron-class oilers was a T3 Tanker class of 35 large, fast twin-screw oilers that began entering service in 1939, the Navy for several years having campaigned for oilers adequate to its needs, as the Patoka and Alameda classes clearly were not. "The high [18-knot] speed intended for these ships (12 to 13 knots was then considered the norm for a tanker) led to the introduction of the term "fast tanker," which was coined to describe these and all subsequent high-speed tankers subsidized by the maritime commission before World War II. The increases in speed and the extraordinary size of the propulsion system (the fastest commercial tankers then being built in the United States had only 5,000 s.h.p.) were obviously made to accommodate the navy's wishes, demonstrating once again the mutual interests shared between the navy and the maritime commission." The original 12 and the 18 wartime repeats of these ships were of the U.S. Maritime Commission's Type T3-S2-A1 (7,256/24,830 tons displacement); the last five were of the very similar but slightly larger T3-S2-A3 type (7,423/25,480 tons), sometimes called the Mispillion class. Four of the ships were converted into escort carriers (CVEs) in 1942, and two others were lost in combat.

From 1964 through 1967, eight of the T3 type oilers were "jumboized", including all five of the Mispillion-class and three of the Cimarron-class ships. This jumboization was done by cutting the ships in two with cutting torches, pulling the aft sections away, and moving in new mid-bodies and welding them to the bows and sterns. After many other cutting and welding modifications a new long ship was created; the three Cimarron-class jumbos were known as the Ashtabula-class.

USS Kaskaskia (AO-27) pioneered the superior span-wire or "Elwood" refueling rig in December 1944. The first ram-tensioned rig was installed on USS Pawcatuck (AO-108) in 1954.

Type T3-S2-A1:

- Cimarron (AO-22)
- Neosho (AO-23), sunk in the Coral Sea 11 May 1942, up to 178 were killed
- Platte (AO-24)
- Sabine (AO-25)
- Salamonie (AO-26)
- Kaskaskia (AO-27)
- Sangamon (AO-28), converted to CVE-26
- Santee (AO-29), converted to CVE-29
- Chemung (AO-30), Operation Dominic nuclear test participant
- Chenango (AO-31), converted to CVE-28
- Guadalupe (AO-32)
- Suwannee (AO-33), converted to CVE-27
- Ashtabula (AO-51), jumboized
- Cacapon (AO-52)
- Caliente (AO-53)
- Chikaskia (AO-54)
- Elokomin (AO-55)
- Aucilla (AO-56)
- Marias (AO-57)
- Manatee (AO-58)
- Mississinewa (AO-59), sunk at Ulithi 20 November 1944, 63 killed
- Nantahala (AO-60)
- Severn (AO-61), Operation Crossroads nuclear test participant
- Taluga (AO-62)
- Chipola (AO-63), Operation Dominic participant
- Tolovana (AO-64), Operation Dominic participant
- Allagash (AO-97)
- Caloosahatchee (AO-98), jumboized
- Canisteo (AO-99), jumboized
- Chukawan (AO-100)

Type T3-S2-A3 (Mispillion subclass, all jumboized):

- Mispillion (AO-105)
- Navasota (AO-106)
- Passumpsic (AO-107)
- Pawcatuck (AO-108)
- Waccamaw (AO-109), later T-AOT-109

=== Chicopee class ===
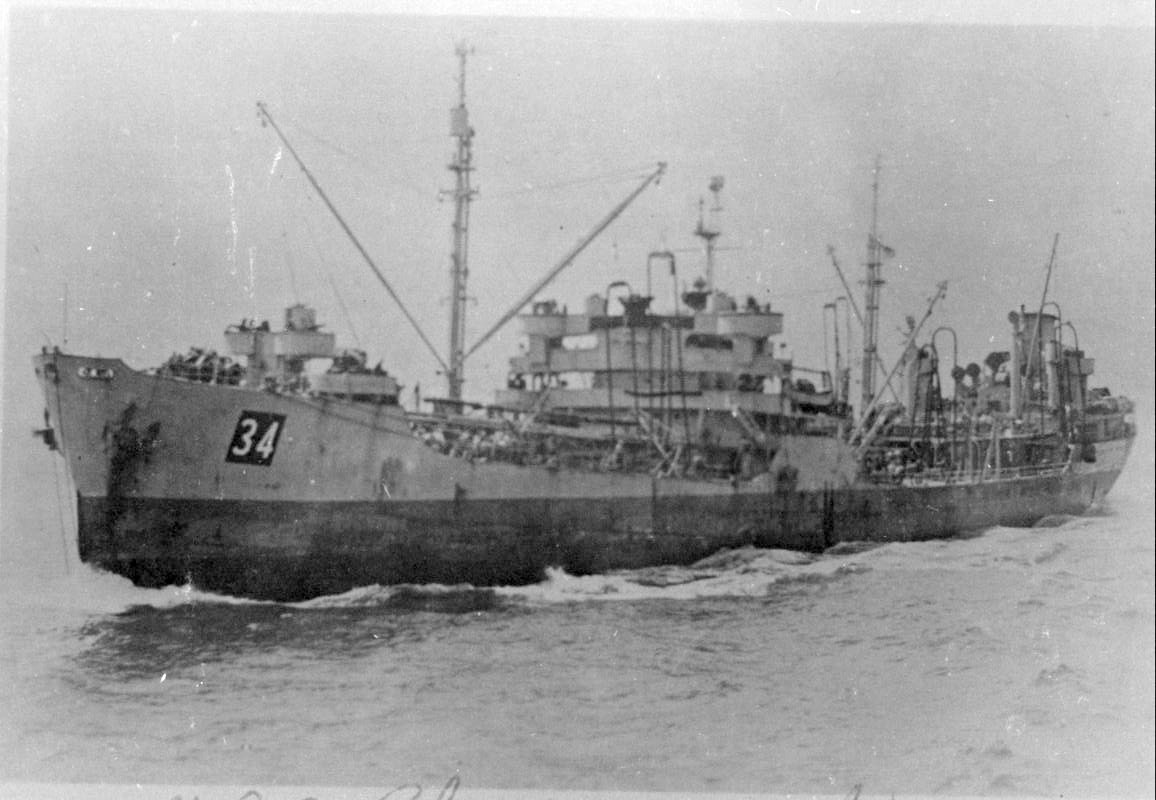
USS Chicopee (AO-34)

In January 1942 the Navy moved to acquire two tankers then building for Standard Oil of New Jersey, the 5800/21,800 ton Esso Trenton and Esso Albany. These ships although not a Maritime Commission design were in fact very similar to the T2-A type commissioned as the Mattaponi-class, having been ordered by Standard Oil as replacements for the previously-requisitioned T3s Esso Albany (USS Sabine) and Esso Trenton (USS Sangamon), and at 17+ knots were the fastest single-screw oilers in the Navy.

- Chicopee (AO-34)
- Housatonic (AO-35)

=== Kennebec class ===
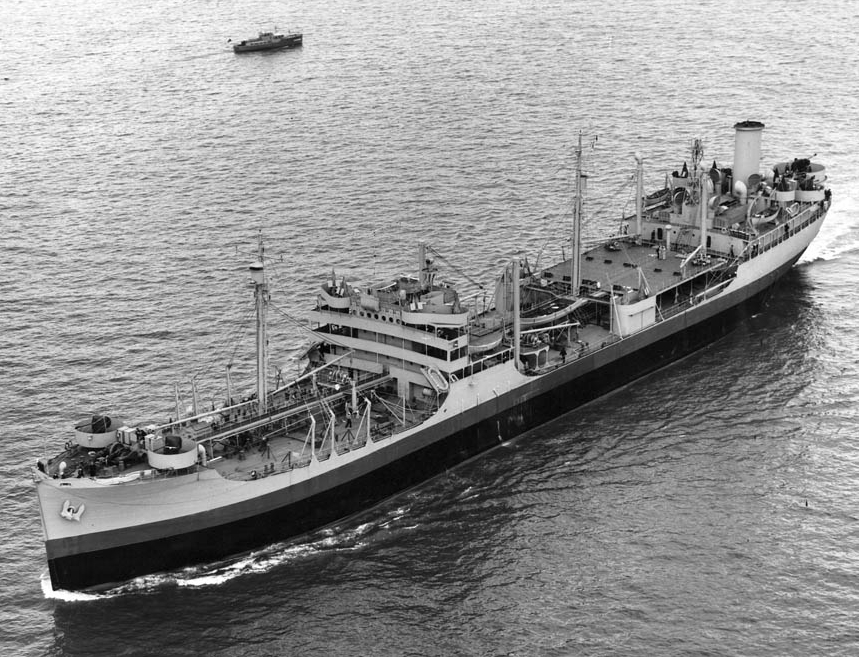
USS Niobrara (AO-72)

The second large oiler class built during World War II was the Kennebec-class. These 16 ships were of the single-screw Maritime Commission type T2 (5580/21,000t, 16.5kt), larger T2-A (5880/21,750t, 16.5kt) and similar but somewhat slower T3-S-A1 (5630/21,000t, 15.3kt).

Type T2:

- Kennebec (AO-36)
- Merrimack (AO-37)
- Winooski (AO-38)
- Kankakee (AO-39)
- Lackawanna (AO-40)
- Neosho (AO-48)

Type T2-A (Mattaponi class):

- Mattaponi (AO-41)
- Monongahela (AO-42)
- Tappahannock (AO-43)
- Patuxent (AO-44)
- Neches (AO-47)

Type T3-S-A1 (Chiwawa class):

- Chiwawa (AO-68)
- Enoree (AO-69), Operation Crossroads participant
- Escalante (AO-70)
- Neshanic (AO-71)
- Niobrara (AO-72)

=== Big Horn and Victoria ===
Gulf Oil's 1936 Gulf Dawn was requisitioned in April 1942, renamed Big Horn and nominally designated AO-45; in fact she was modified into a Q-ship, a U-boat decoy equipped with concealed guns. She was transferred in 1944 to the Coast Guard as USCGC Big Horn (WAO-124), then back to the Navy as a transport tanker in 1945.

SS George G. Henry had already served in the Navy in 1917-18 under her own name; as one of the few tankers to escape the Philippines in December 1941 and be available to the Allied fleet in Australia, she was recommissioned under an emergency bare-boat charter at Melbourne the following April and named for the Australian state. Her civilian master, a Naval Reserve officer, was placed on active duty and continued in command.

- Big Horn (AO-45), ex-Gulf Dawn, later WAO-124 and IX-207
- Victoria (AO-46), ex-George G. Henry ex-ID-1560

=== Suamico class ===
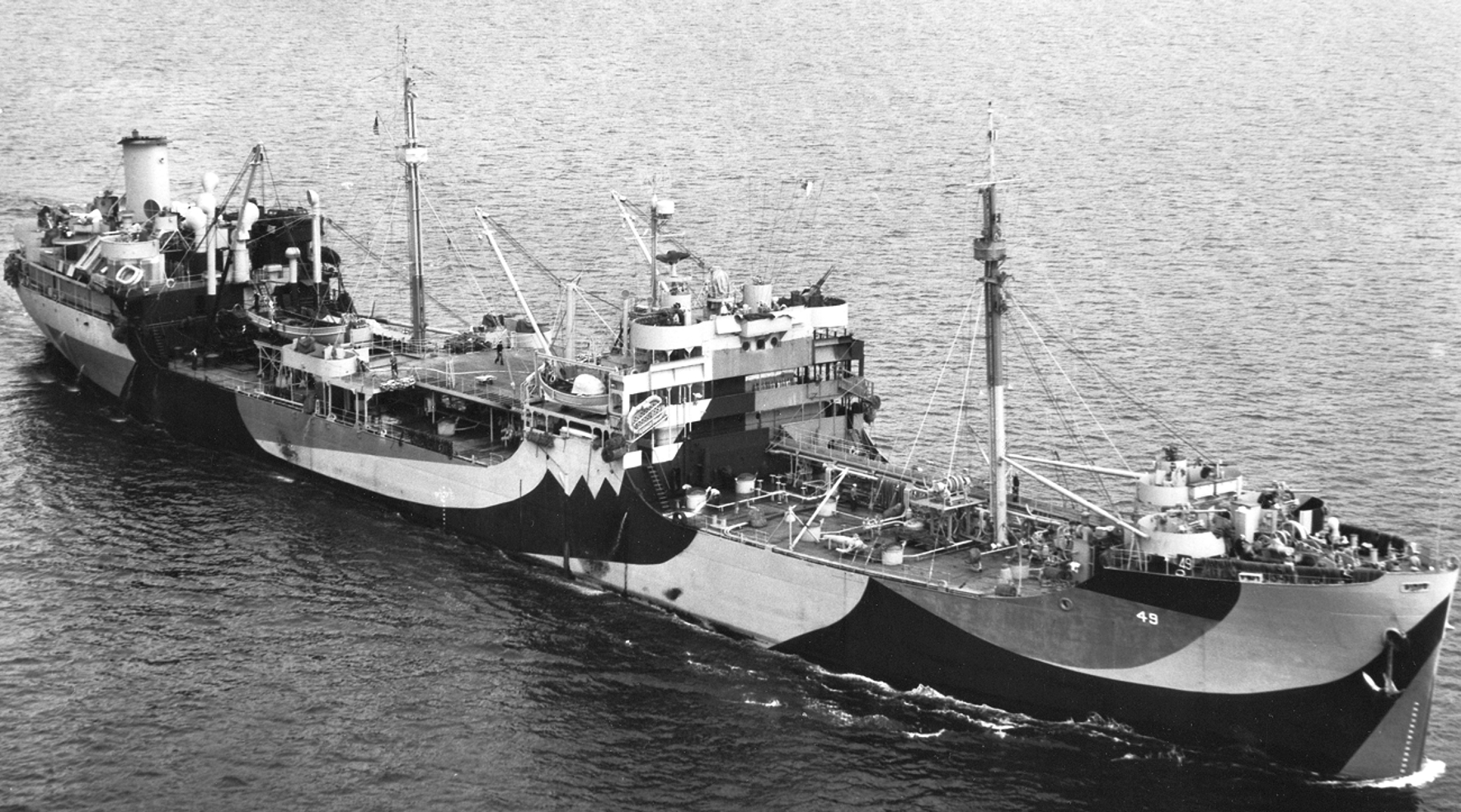
USS Suamico (AO-49)

The third large oiler class built during World War II was the Suamico-class. These 5730/21,880-ton oilers were of the MARAD Type T2-SE, differing from the Kennebec-class ships principally in having turbo-electric drive, a consequence of a chronic shortage of reduction gearing. The T2-SE-A2 Escambias subclass had more powerful engines and were markedly faster than the -A1s. 30 of these oilers were ordered, but three of them were canceled before their completion; two others were converted into water distillation ships (AW) and one into a water tanker. One of these oilers sank in 1947, and a second in Military Sealift Command (MSC) service in 1972. Some of the Escambias were later transferred to the US Army and used as mobile electric power plants in Vietnam. The T2-SE-A3 (Cohocton) subclass were mostly canceled, but would have differed from the A2s only in being built from the start with UNREP gear rather than being converted by the Navy.

Type T2-SE-A1:

- Suamico (AO-49)
- Tallulah (AO-50), later T-AOT-50
- Pecos (AO-65)
- Cache (AO-67), later T-AOT-67
- Millicoma (AO-73), later T-AOT-73
- Saranac (AO-74)
- Saugatuck (AO-75), later T-AOT-75
- Schuylkill (AO-76), later T-AOT-76
- Cossatot (AO-77), later T-AOT-77
- Chepachet (AO-78), later T-AOT-78
- Cowanesque (AO-79), later T-AOT-79

Type T2-SE-A2 (Escambia subclass):

- Escambia (AO-80)
- Kennebago (AO-81)
- Cahaba (AO-82)
- Mascoma (AO-83)
- Ocklawaha (AO-84)
- Pamanset (AO-85)
- Ponaganset (AO-86)
- Sebec (AO-87)
- Tomahawk (AO-88)
- Pasig (AO-91), converted to AW-3
- Abatan (AO-92), converted to AW-4
- Soubarissen (AO-93), converted to water tanker
- Anacostia (AO-94)
- Caney (AO-95)
- Tamalpais (AO-96)

=== Atascosa ===
The Navy requisitioned Standard Oil's 6000/24,100-ton Esso Columbia shortly after her launch in September 1942. At 18,500 dwt / 24,660 flt Atascosa was the largest oiler by capacity operated by the Navy during World War II.

- Atascosa (AO-66)

=== Pasig and Shikellamy ===
The elderly tanker J. C. Donnell was acquired in January 1943 with the intent of using her as a floating storage tank at New Caledonia. When it turned out that concrete barges could fulfill that role, USS Pasig was briefly returned to her owners in September. Her name was given to one of the Escambia-class, with hull number AO-91. Sinclair Oil's Daniel Pierce was requisitioned in March 1943 and renamed USS Shikellamy (AO-90); in July however she was converted to a gasoline tanker and redesignated AOG-47.

- Pasig (AO-89), ex-J. C. Donnell (1917)
- Shikellamy (AO-90), ex-Daniel Pierce (1921; later AOG-47)

=== Suamico class, Cohocton subclass ===
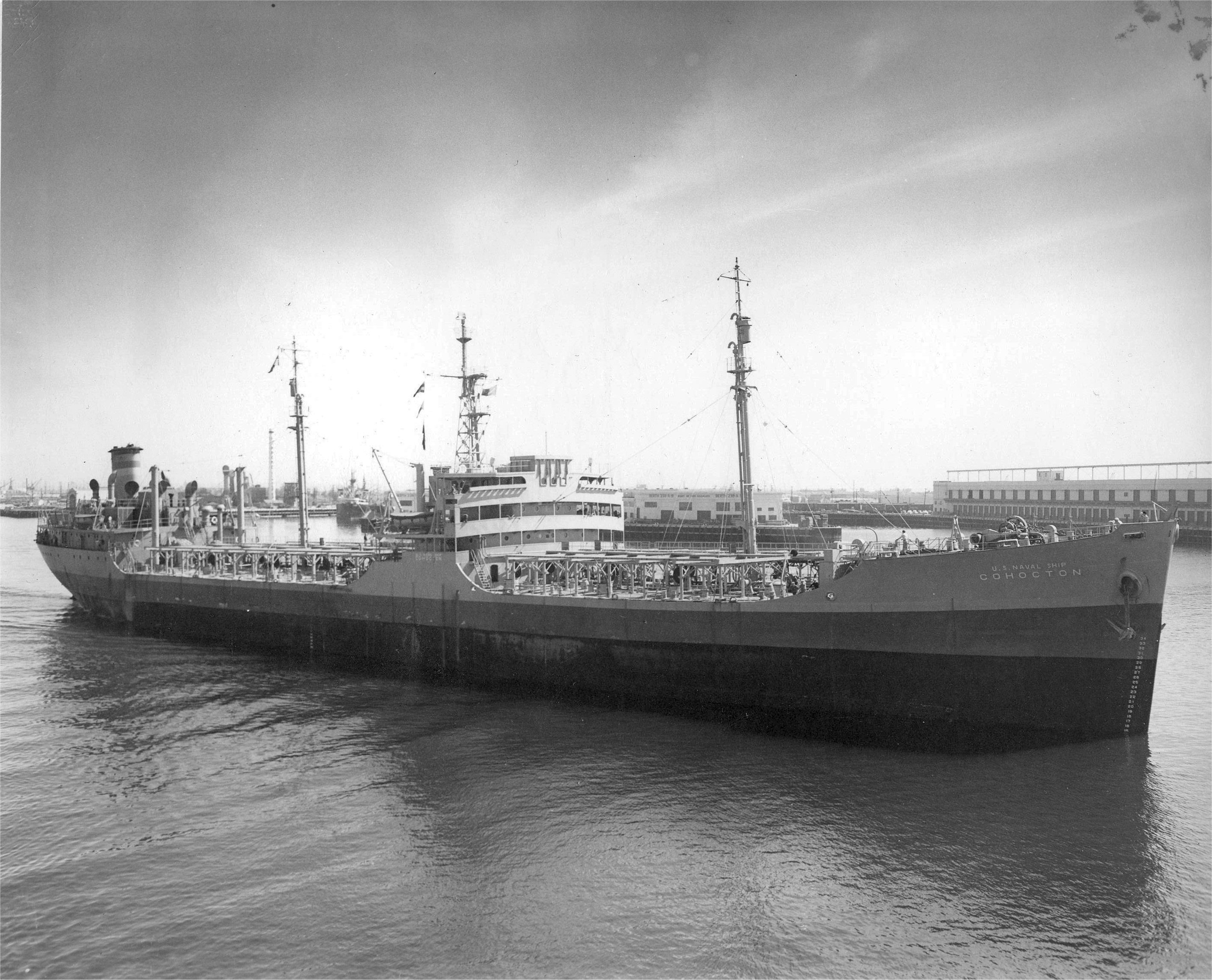
USS Cohocton (AO-101)

Type T2-SE-A3 (Cohocton subclass):

- Cohocton (AO-101)
- Concho (AO-102), canceled, later completed as Mission Santa Ana (T-AO-137)
- Conecuh (AO-103), canceled, later completed as Mission Los Angeles (T-AO-117)
- Contoocook (AO-104), canceled, later completed as Mission San Francisco (T-AO-123)

=== Dithmarschen / Conecuh ===
The USS Conecuh was the former German tanker Dithmarschen and was acquired as a war prize in 1946. She was reclassified as the first fleet replenishment tanker (AOR).

- Conecuh (AO-110), ex-IX-301, later AOR-110

=== Mission Buenaventura class ===
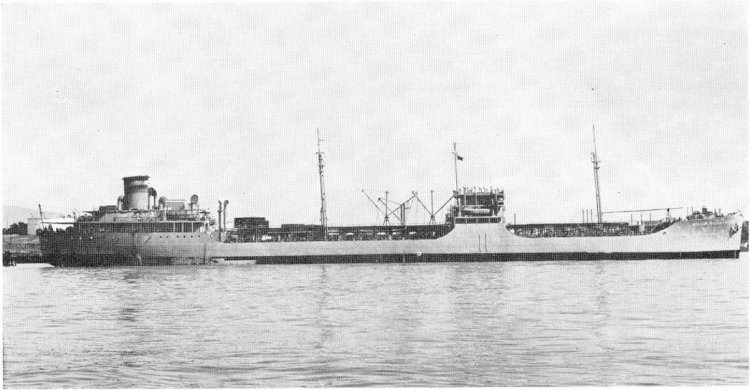
USNS Mission Buenaventura (T-AO-111)

The Missions were Type T2-SE-A2 ships like the Navy's Escambia-class ordered by the Maritime Commission in 1943 as civilian-operated transport tankers. The original order was for thirty, but six were taken over by the Navy and commissioned as AO-91 to 96; on the other hand the Maritime Commission took over three canceled Navy oilers of the nearly identical T2-SE-A3 type. After operating under civilian charter during the late war and immediate postwar period, transporting fuel to the many US forces overseas, they were transferred to the Naval Transportation Service in 1947-48 and the new Military Sea Transportation Service (MSTS) in 1949.

Three Mission-class ships were later converted to Missile Range Instrumentation Ships (T-AGMs).

T2-SE-A2:

- Mission Buenaventura (T-AO-111)
- Mission Capistrano (T-AO-112), later T-AG-162
- Mission Carmel (T-AO-113)
- Mission De Pala (T-AO-114), later T-AGM-20
- Mission Dolores (T-AO-115)
- Mission Loreto (T-AO-116)
- Mission Purisima (T-AO-118)
- Mission San Antonio (T-AO-119)
- Mission San Carlos (T-AO-120)
- Mission San Diego (T-AO-121)
- Mission San Fernando (T-AO-122), later T-AG-194, T-AGM-19
- Mission San Gabriel (T-AO-124)
- Mission San Jose (T-AO-125)
- Mission San Juan (T-AO-126), later T-AGM-21
- Mission San Luis Obispo (T-AO-127)
- Mission San Luis Rey (T-AO-128)
- Mission San Miguel (T-AO-129), lost in grounding 8 October 1957
- Mission San Rafael (T-AO-130)
- Mission Santa Barbara (T-AO-131)
- Mission Santa Clara (T-AO-132)
- Mission Santa Cruz (T-AO-133)
- Mission Santa Ynez (T-AO-134)
- Mission Solano (T-AO-135)
- Mission Soledad (T-AO-136)

Mission Santa Ynez, scrapped in 2010, was the last survivor of the over 500 T2 tankers built during World War II.

T2-SE-A3:

- Mission Los Angeles (T-AO-117), ex-Conecuh AO-103
- Mission San Francisco (T-AO-123), ex-Contoocook AO-104, lost in collision 7 March 1957, 10 killed
- Mission Santa Ana (T-AO-137), ex-Concho AO-102)

=== Cedar Creek class ===
Five Type T2-SE-A1 tankers were transferred to the USSR under Lend-Lease and four returned to the United States in 1948-49, making them part of the extended Suamico family. The Maritime Administration replaced the wrecked Donbass (ex-Beacon Rock) with her sister Sappa Creek.

- Cedar Creek (T-AO-138) (ex-Tagonrog)
- Muir Woods (T-AO-139) (ex-Elbrus)
- Pioneer Valley (T-AO-140) (ex-Krasnaya Armia)
- Sappa Creek (T-AO-141)
- Shawnee Trail (T-AO-142) (ex-Emba II)

=== Neosho class ===
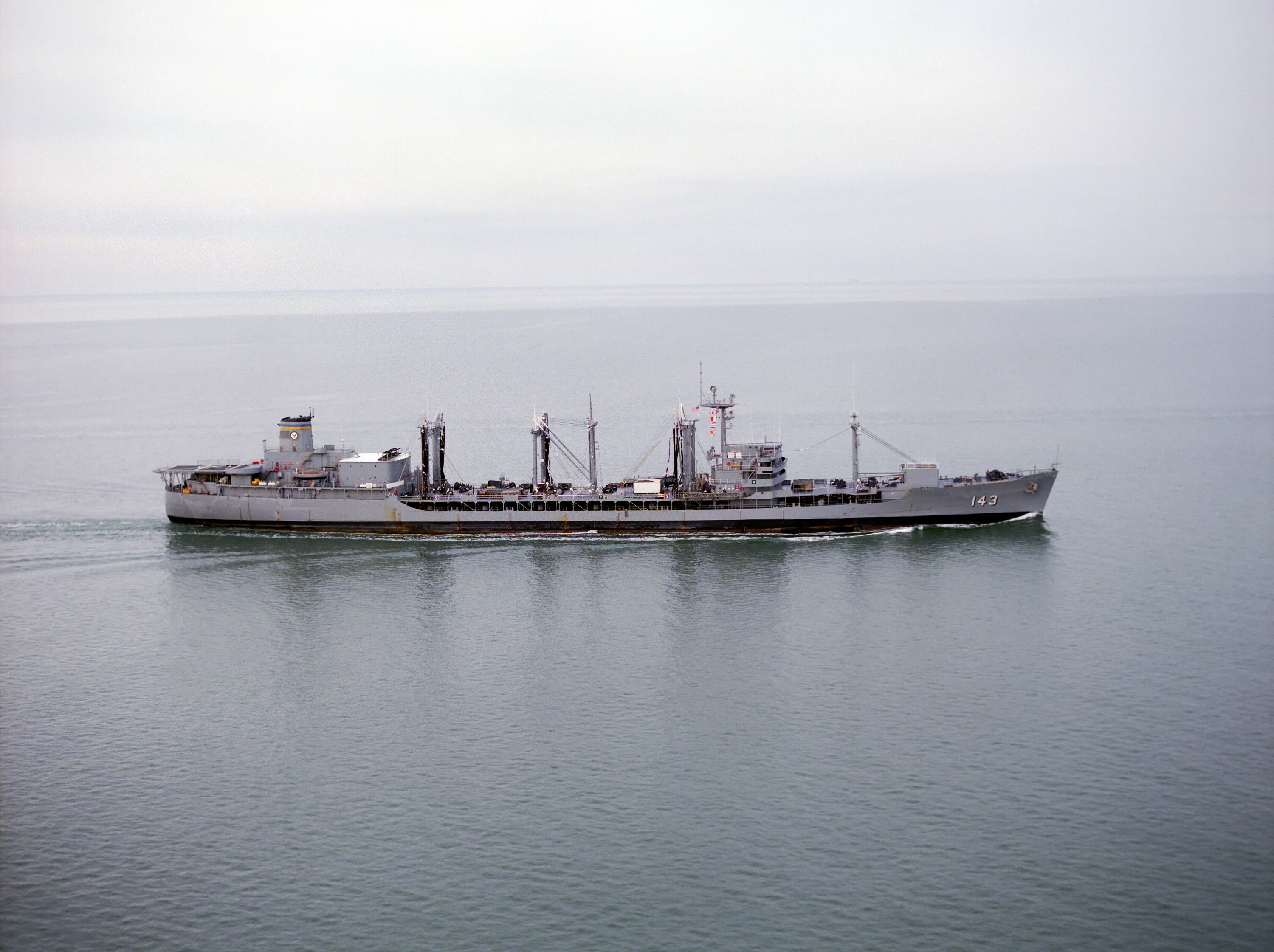
USNS Neosho (T-AO-143)

The 11,600/38,000-ton Neosho-class oilers were the first oilers built for the US Navy after World War II, the first built expressly as naval oilers rather than conversions of civilian tanker designs, and the first designed from the outset to support jet operations. Six of these oilers were completed during 1954 and 55. "They were the first oilers designed specifically for underway replenishment. The final PROBE fueling device design was approved in 1965, consisting of a male fitting attached to the terminal end of a seven-inch hose". The Neoshos were also markedly larger than any previous USN oilers at over 650 feet in length (T6 class) with a capacity of 180,000 barrels of fuel.

- Neosho (AO-143), Operation Argus nuclear test participant, decommissioned on 25 May 1978, transferred to MSC
- Mississinewa (AO-144)
- Hassayampa (AO-145), Operation Dominic nuclear test participant, placed In-Service with Military Sealift Command as USNS Hassayampa (T-AO 145) on 17 November 1978
- Kawishiwi (AO-146) (decommissioned on 10 October 1979, and placed in service with MSC)
- Truckee (AO-147) (transferred to Military Sealift Command 30 January 1980)
- Ponchatoula (AO-148), Operation Dominic participant

=== Maumee class ===
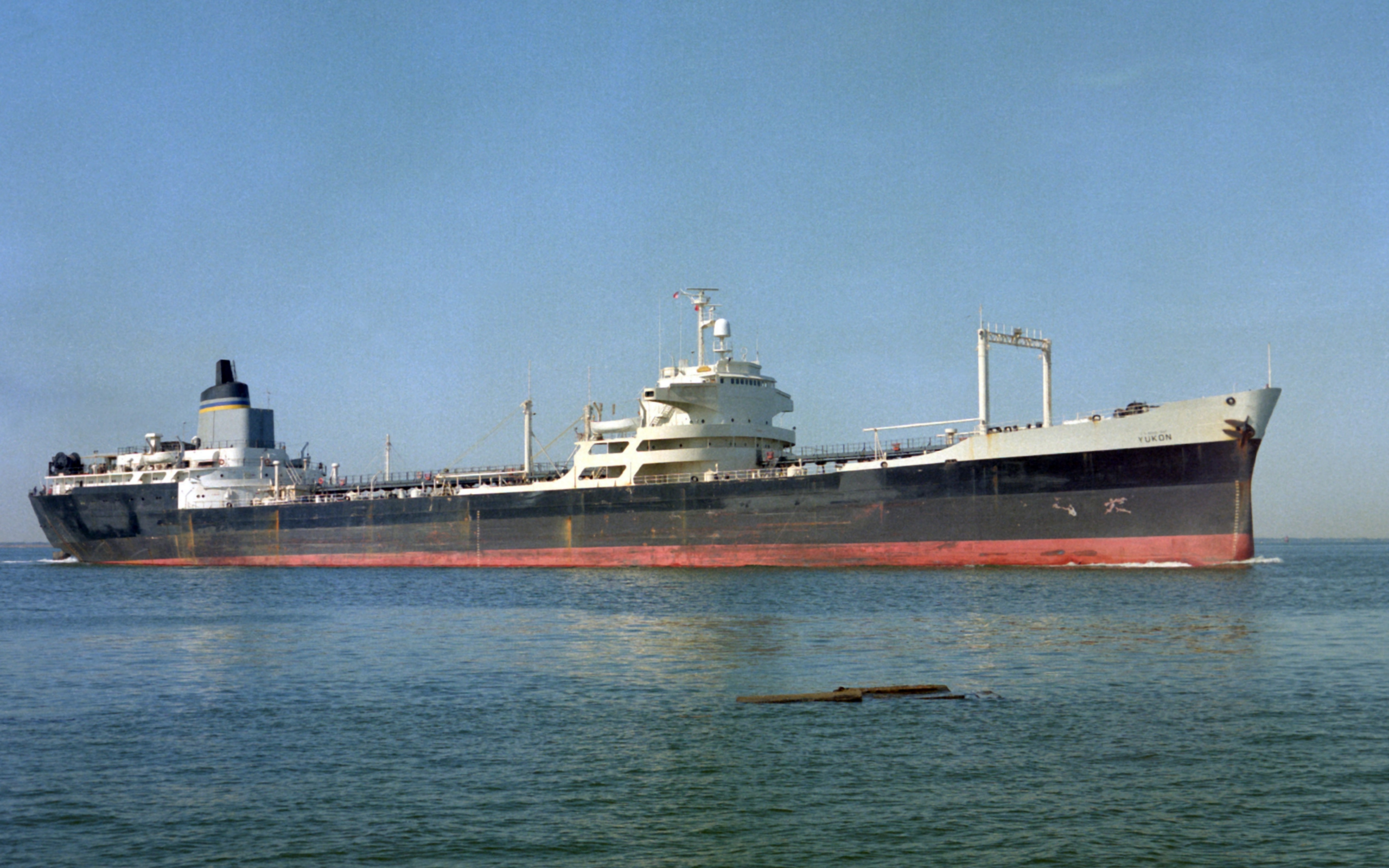
USNS Yukon (T-AO-152)

The Maumee-class were four 7184/32,950 ton T5-S-12a transport oilers that were in service from the mid-1950s through the mid-1980s. These were the first tankers built specifically for the MSTS (later the Military Sealift Command). The ships were not designed for underway replenishment (refueling ships at sea), but rather, they were made to carry bulk quantities of petroleum products, such as fuel oil, diesel fuel, and aviation fuel, to American and allied military forces overseas.

At some time after the loss of USNS Potomac, the three survivors were reclassified as Transport Oilers (AOT).

- Maumee (T-AO-149)
- Potomac (T-AO-150), largely destroyed in a 26 September 1961 pier side fire, 2 killed, salvaged, later became T-AOT-181
- Shoshone (T-AO-151)
- Yukon (T-AO-152)

=== Cumberland class ===
At the time of the 1956 Suez Crisis the MSTS purchased twelve additional T2-SE-A1 merchant tankers, making them belated members of the vast Suamico class. Their naval service was temporary; with the strain on US tanker capacity easing in late 1957 the twelve were transferred to Maritime Administration custody and struck.

- Cumberland (T-AO-153) (ex-Esso Cumberland)
- Lynchburg (T-AO-154) (ex-Esso Lynchburg)
- Roanoke (T-AO-155) (ex-Esso Roanoke)
- Bull Run (T-AO-156)
- Paoli (T-AO-157)
- Abiqua (T-AO-158)
- French Creek (T-AO-159)
- Logan's Fort (T-AO-160)
- Lone Jack (T-AO-161)
- Memphis (T-AO-162) (ex-Esso Memphis)
- Parkersburg (T-AO-163) (ex-Fort Cornwallis)
- Petrolite (T-AO-164) (ex-Hanging Rock)

=== American Explorer ===
A T5-S-RM2a tanker, American Explorer was laid down in 1957, intended to be the world's first nuclear-powered tanker, but construction costs ballooned; the MSTS, using funds left over from the construction of the Maumee-class, funded her completion with a conventional steam plant.

- American Explorer (T-AO-165), later T-AOT-165

=== Sealift class ===
By 1970 the MSTS, now renamed the Military Sealift Command (MSC), was operating an aging tanker fleet comprising largely WW2-built ships, which were wearing out. With limited budgets, MSC hit upon a build-and-charter program, under which new tankers would be built for private ownership but chartered to MSC for twenty years. These nine new tankers were the Sealift class, which were intended to replace the T2s; their size was kept relatively small (587', 6786/34,000t) for access to smaller ports and shallower anchorages. They served from 1974 to 1995 and were reclassed as AOTs in the late 1970s.

- Sealift Pacific (T-AO-168)
- Sealift Arabian Sea (T-AO-169)
- Sealift China Sea (T-AO-170)
- Sealift Indian Ocean (T-AO-171)
- Sealift Atlantic (T-AO-172)
- Sealift Mediterranean (T-AO-173)
- Sealift Caribbean (T-AO-174)
- Sealift Arctic (T-AO-175)
- Sealift Antarctic (T-AO-176)

=== Cimarron class (1979) ===
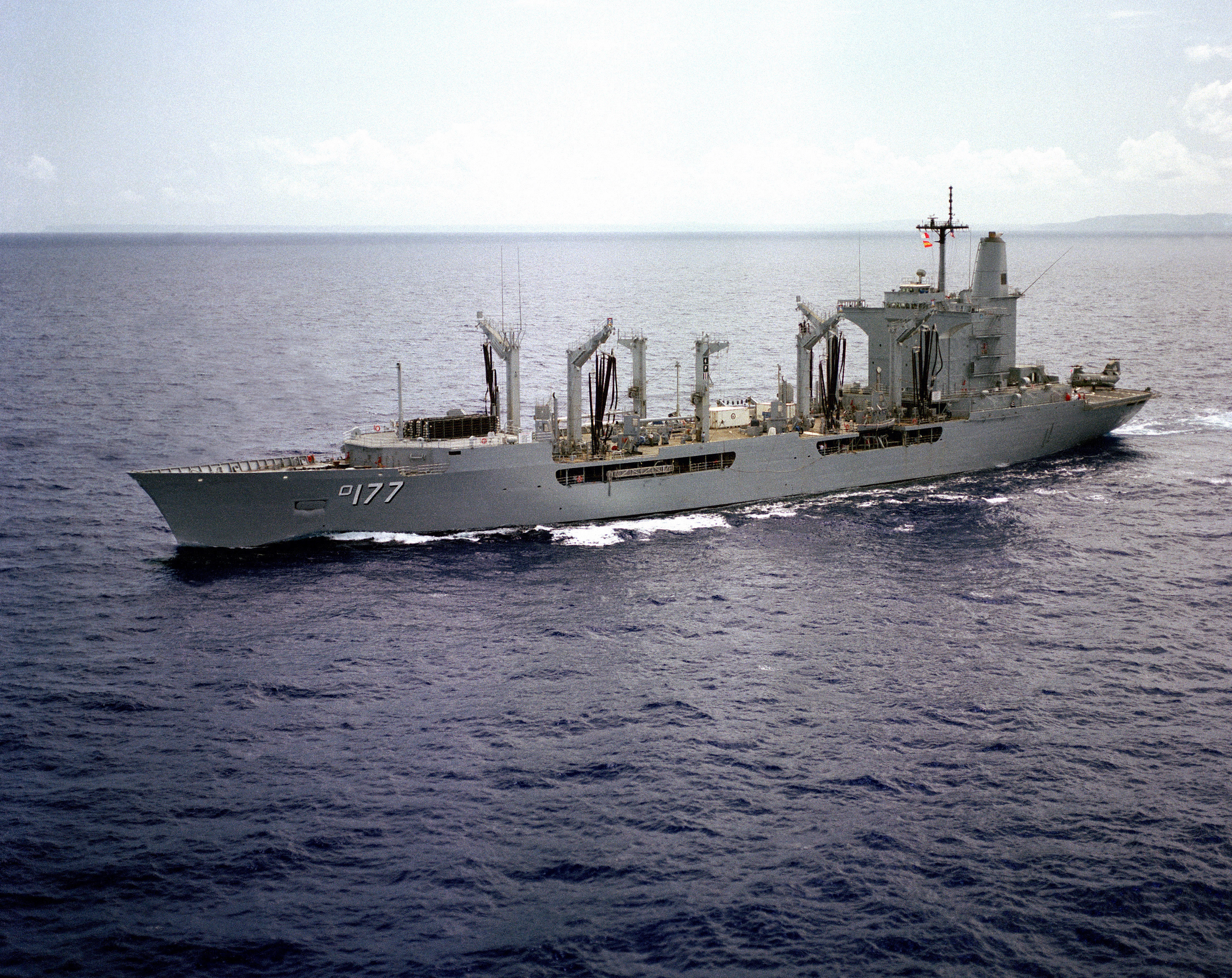
USS Cimarron (AO-177)

The second Cimarron-class was a class of five fleet oilers that were commissioned in the early 1980s to replace older oilers constructed during World War II. Due to budget restrictions, these ships were constructed smaller than was actually needed, requiring them to be "jumboized" in the late 1980s and early 1990s. Displacement was 8200 tons as built and 11,650/36,800 after jumboization. However, to save expenses and in keeping with the Navy's move away from steam propulsion, these ships were decommissioned in the late 1990s and replaced by the diesel-powered Henry J. Kaiser-class oilers manned by the Military Sealift Command (MSC).

- Cimarron (AO-177)
- Monongahela (AO-178)
- Merrimack (AO-179)
- Willamette (AO-180)
- Platte (AO-186)

=== Potomac ===
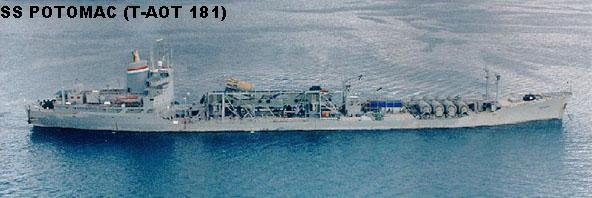
SS Potomac (T-AOT-181), note the green Single-Anchor Leg Mooring (SALM) on the center deck for use for deploying the OPDS hoses, hose reels are forward

Potomac (T-AO-150) was a Maumee-class ship that suffered a catastrophic fire in 1961 which however left her after section and machinery largely undamaged; this portion was purchased by Keystone Tankships and mated to a new bow and midbody to create SS Shenandoah in 1964. After serving under charter for the MSTS/MSC for several years, Shenandoah was acquired by the Navy in 1976 and transferred to MSC ownership under her old name. She was the first ship equipped with an offshore petroleum discharge system (OPDS), allowing her to supply fuel to forces ashore by pumping it directly over the beach instead of having to deliver it in a port.

- USNS Potomac (T-AO-150), ex-Shenandoah - MSC purchased her on 12 January 1976, later T-AOT-181

=== Falcon class ===
In parallel with its build/charter operation of the Sealift class, MSC in the 1970s obtained by a similar arrangement four larger T5-class tankers built for Falcon Shipping. All were later reclassed as AOTs.

- Columbia (T-AO-182), ex-Falcon Lady
- Neches (T-AO-183), ex-Falcon Duchess
- Hudson (T-AO-184), ex-Falcon Countess
- Susquehanna (T-AO-185), ex-Falcon Princess

=== Henry J. Kaiser class ===
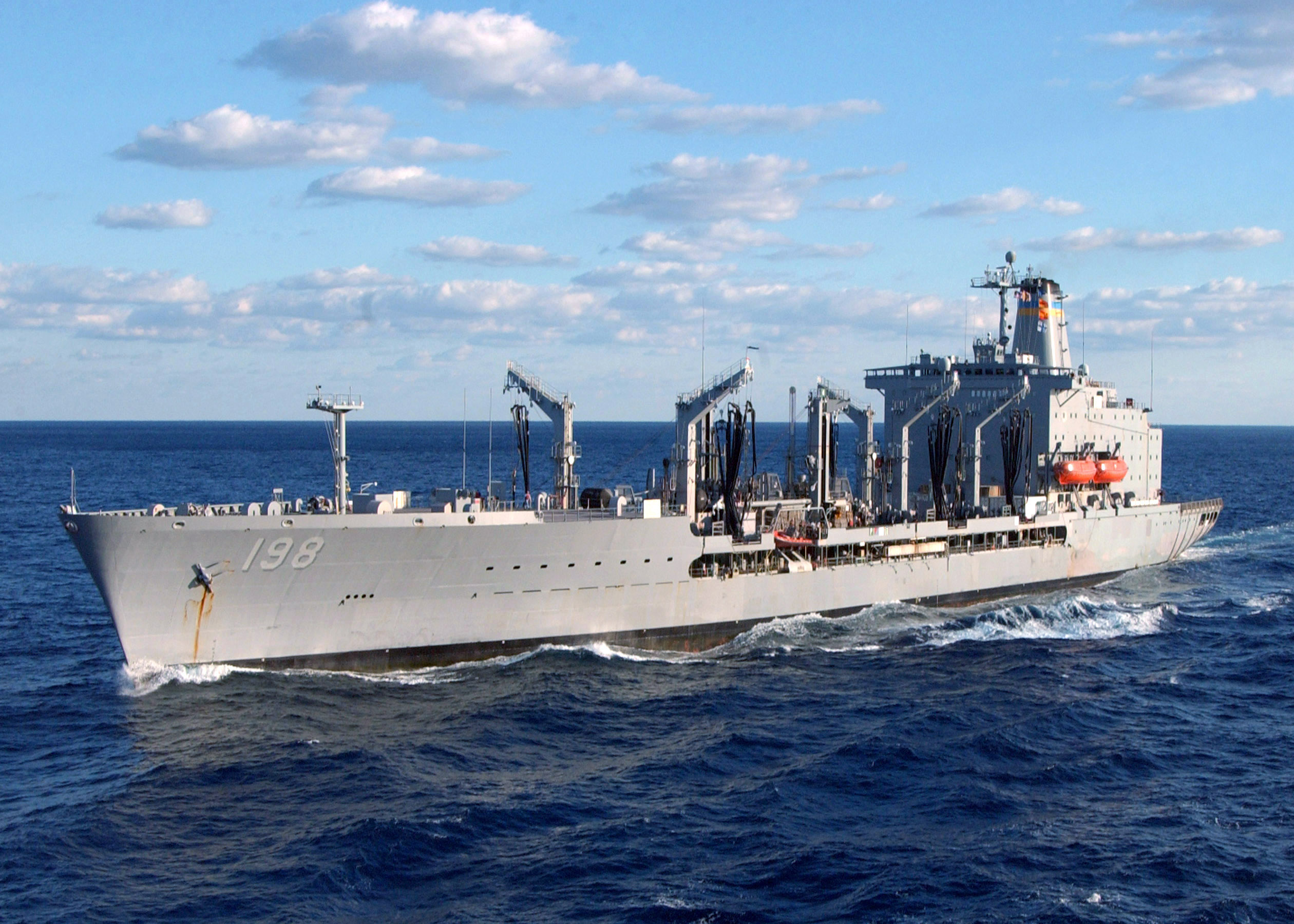
USNS Big Horn (T-AO-198)

The Henry J. Kaiser replenishment oilers are a class of fleet replenishment oilers for which construction began in August 1984. This class is composed of eighteen underway replenishment oilers which are operated by the Military Sealift Command to provide underway replenishment of fuel to Navy combat ships and jet fuel for aircraft and helicopters aboard aircraft carriers and surface warships. The Kaiser-class ships also have a limited capacity to supply ammunition, dry stores and refrigerated stores, although not as much as the AOEs and AORs; they do not have helicopter embarkation facilities. A Kaiser-class oiler operating in tandem with a Lewis and Clark-class AKE is considered to be the equivalent of one Supply class AOE.

Two of this class were canceled and laid up incomplete, and a third transferred to the Chilean navy.

- Henry J. Kaiser (T-AO-187) [A]
- Joshua Humphreys (T-AO-188) [A]
- John Lenthall (T-AO-189) [A]
- Andrew J. Higgins (T-AO-190) (sold to Chile, 2009)
- Benjamin Isherwood (T-AO-191) (canceled)
- Henry Eckford (T-AO-192) (canceled)
- Walter S. Diehl (T-AO-193), scrapped
- John Ericsson (T-AO-194) [I]
- Leroy Grumman (T-AO-195) [A]
- Kanawha (T-AO-196) [A]
- Pecos (T-AO-197) [I]
- Big Horn (T-AO-198) [I]
- Tippecanoe (T-AO-199) [A]
- Guadalupe (T-AO-200) [A]
- Patuxent (T-AO-201) [A]
- Yukon (T-AO-202) [A]
- Laramie (T-AO-203) [A]
- Rappahannock (T-AO-204) [A]

=== John Lewis class ===
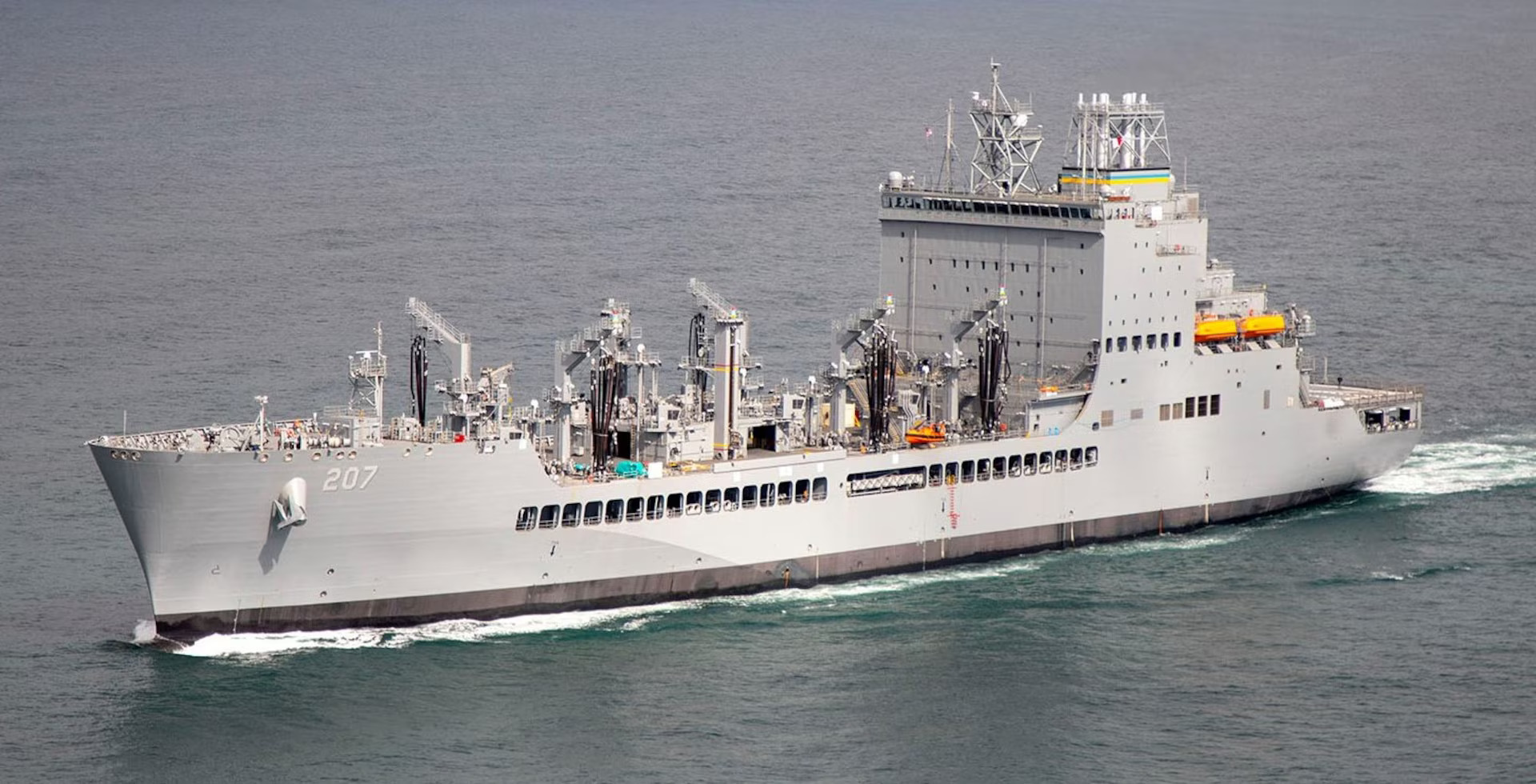
USNS Earl Warren (T-AO-207)

The 2012 30-Year Shipbuilding Plan called for the Kaisers to be replaced by 17 double-hulled vessels under the T-AO(X) program.

- John Lewis (T-AO-205) [A]
- Harvey Milk (T-AO-206) [A]
- Earl Warren (T-AO-207) [A]
- Robert F. Kennedy (T-AO-208) [A]
- Lucy Stone (T-AO-209) [A]
- Sojourner Truth (T-AO-210) [A]
- Thurgood Marshall (T-AO-211) [P] - under construction
- Ruth Bader Ginsburg (T-AO-212) [P] - under construction
- Harriet Tubman (T-AO-213) [P] - under construction
- Dolores Huerta (T-AO 214) - on order
- Joshua L. Goldberg (T-AO 215) - on order
- Thomas D. Parham Jr. (T-AO 216) - on order

== Fast Combat Support Ships (AOE) ==
These fast supply ships combine the functions of a fleet oiler (AO), an ammunition ship (AE), and a refrigerated stores ship (AF) in one, as well as hangars and support facilities for three helicopters for Vertical Replenishment (VERTREP). "One-stop shopping", supplemented by VERTREP transfer, represents a signal decrease in the amount of time a deployed warship has to spend replenishing.

=== Sacramento class ===
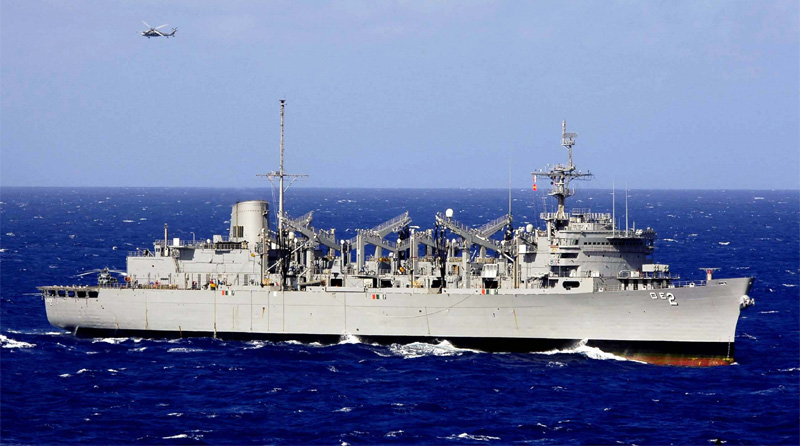
USS Camden (AOE-2)

The Sacramento-class was a class of four fast combat support ships that carried out the refueling, rearming, and resupplying the warships of the US Navy on the oceans of the world, especially aircraft carrier task forces, which are inherently fast-moving groups of warships. To provide these fast support ships with their speed, they were built using (one-half each) the steam turbine propulsion plants of the unfinished Iowa-class battleships Illinois and Kentucky. At nearly 800 feet and 58,000 tons full load, the Sacramentos were the largest oilers ever to serve in the US Navy.

The Sacramento-class ships were in service from 1964 to 2005.

- Sacramento (AOE-1)
- Camden (AOE-2)
- Seattle (AOE-3)
- Detroit (AOE-4)
- (AOE-5), canceled 1968

=== Supply class ===
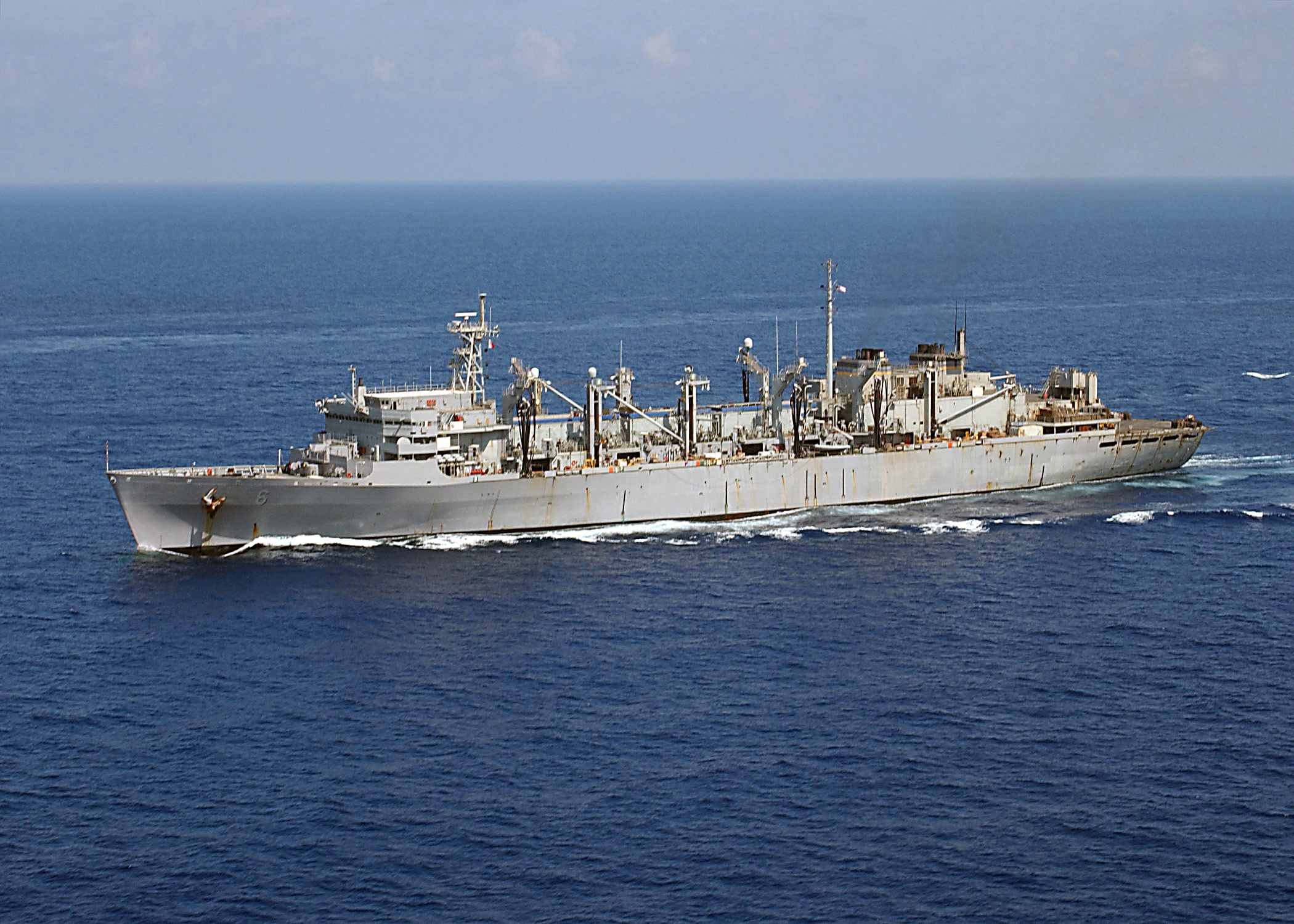
USNS Supply (T-AOE-6)

The four Sacramento-class supply ships were replaced by the four Supply-class ships commissioned between 1994 and 1998. All of these 48,800 long ton AOEs have been operated by the MSC since 2005. As with the Sacramento-class, a fifth ship was canceled.

- Supply (T-AOE-6) [A]
- Rainier (T-AOE-7) [I]
- Arctic (T-AOE-8) [A]
- Conecuh (AOE-9) (canceled)
- Bridge (T-AOE-10) [I]

== Light Replenishment Oilers (T-AOL) ==
The Navy plans to begin in 2026 the construction of a class of oilers "that is smaller than a full-sized oiler" because "the Navy wants to begin shifting to a new, more distributed fleet architecture (i.e., mix of ships) that is intended to...[avoid] a situation in which an adversary could defeat U.S. naval forces by concentrating its attacks on a relatively small number of large, high-value U.S. Navy ships."

== Fleet Replenishment Oilers (AOR) ==
A replenishment oiler, like an AOE, supplies ammunition and dry stores in addition to fuel, but is not as fast and typically only is capable of the usual auxiliary speed of 18-20 knots. AORs historically have also been smaller than AOEs.

=== Conecuh ===
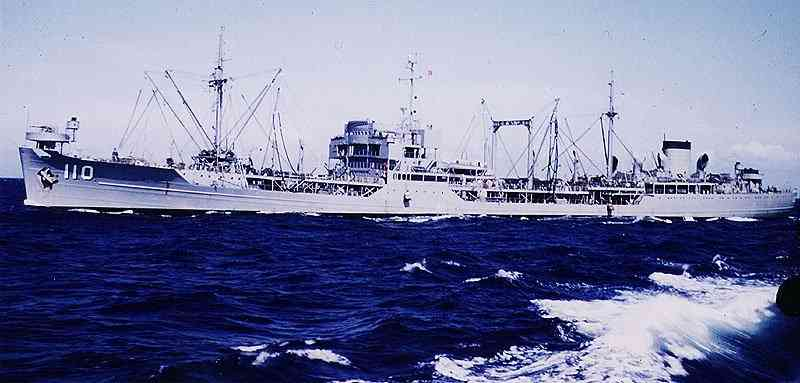
USS Conecuh (AO/AOR-110)

The first ship to carry the AOR-designation was USS Conecuh, which was acquired as a war prize in 1946. She was the former German tanker Dithmarschen, and she served in the US Navy from 1953 through 1956, where she was used to test the concept of the AOE/AOR.

- Conecuh (AOR-110), ex-IX-301, AO-110

=== Wichita class ===
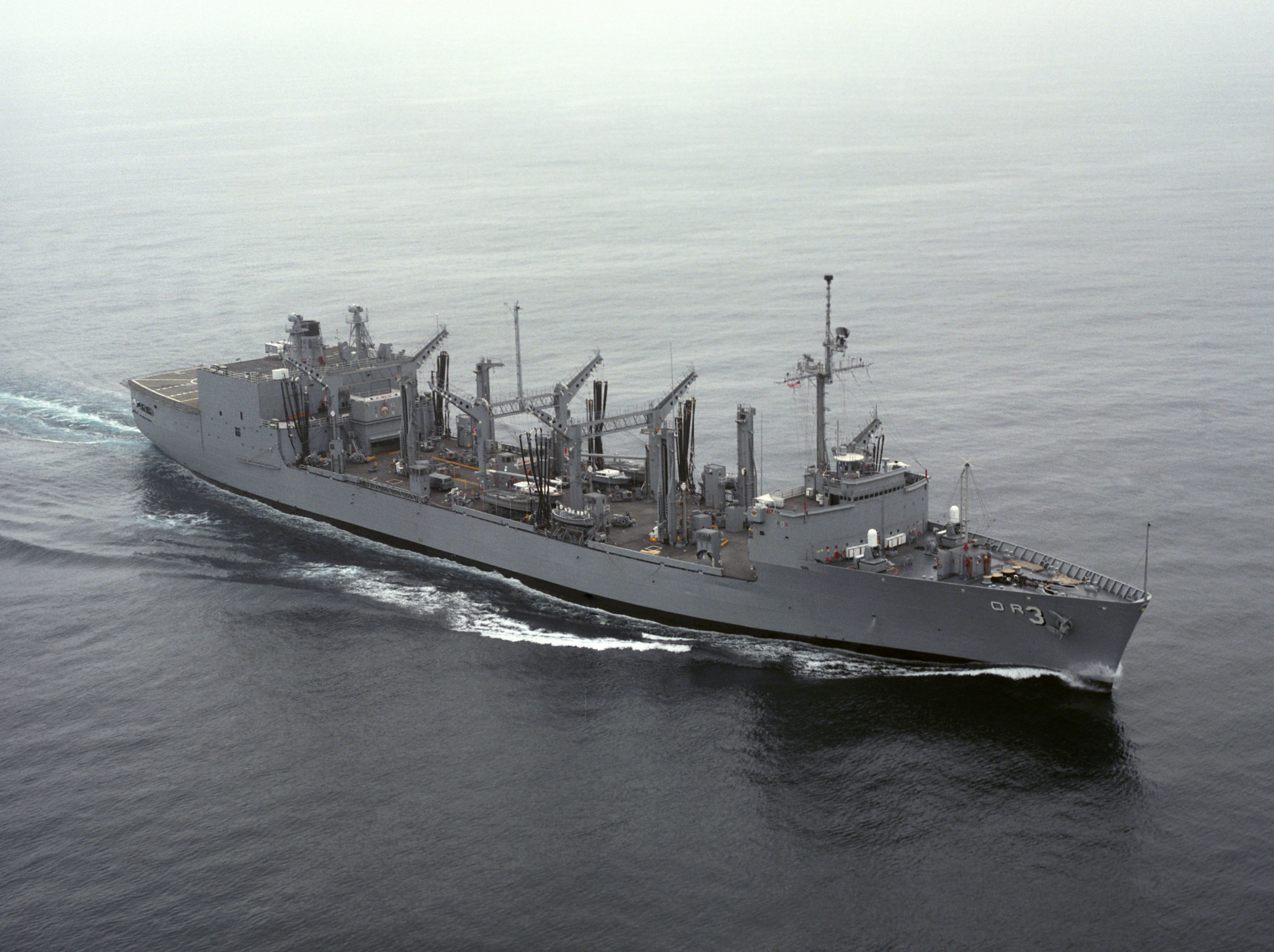
USS Kansas City (AOR-3)

The Wichita-class comprised seven 13,500/40,000-ton replenishment oilers that were used from the late 1960s through the mid-1990s. These ships, similar to but smaller and slower than the AOEs, though larger and faster than the Neosho-class, were designed for rapid underway replenishment using both connected replenishment and vertical replenishment (supplies carried from ship to ship by helicopters). The ships could carry 160,000 barrels of petroleum fuel, 600 tons of munitions, 200 tons of dry stores, and 100 tons of refrigerated supplies. With the overall reduction in size in the US Navy fleet, these ships were all decommissioned and stricken during the 1990s.

- Wichita (AOR-1)
- Milwaukee (AOR-2)
- Kansas City (AOR-3)
- Savannah (AOR-4)
- Wabash (AOR-5)
- Kalamazoo (AOR-6)
- Roanoke (AOR-7)

== Transport Oilers (AOT) ==
The T-AOT Transport Oilers or Transport Tankers are part of the Military Sealift Command's Sealift Program, carrying fuel for the Department of Defense. They are not intended to operate with the fleet or provide underway refueling, but to move fuel in support of military operations to ports and depots around the world. Some ships were equipped with an offshore petroleum discharge system (OPDS), which allowed them to supply fuel to forces ashore after an amphibious assault without port facilities. They are operated by civilian crews.

=== Suamico- and Cimarron-classes ===
- USNS Tallulah (T-AOT-50), ex-AO-50
- USNS Cache (T-AOT-67), ex-AO-67
- USNS Millicoma (T-AOT-73), ex-AO-73
- USNS Saugatuck (T-AOT-75), ex-AO-75
- USNS Schuylkill (T-AOT-76), ex-AO-76
- USNS Cossatot (T-AOT-77), ex-AO-77
- USNS Chepachet (T-AOT-78), ex-AO-78
- USNS Cowanesque (T-AOT-79), ex-AO-79
- USNS Waccamaw (T-AOT-109), ex-AO-109

=== Maumee class redesignated ===
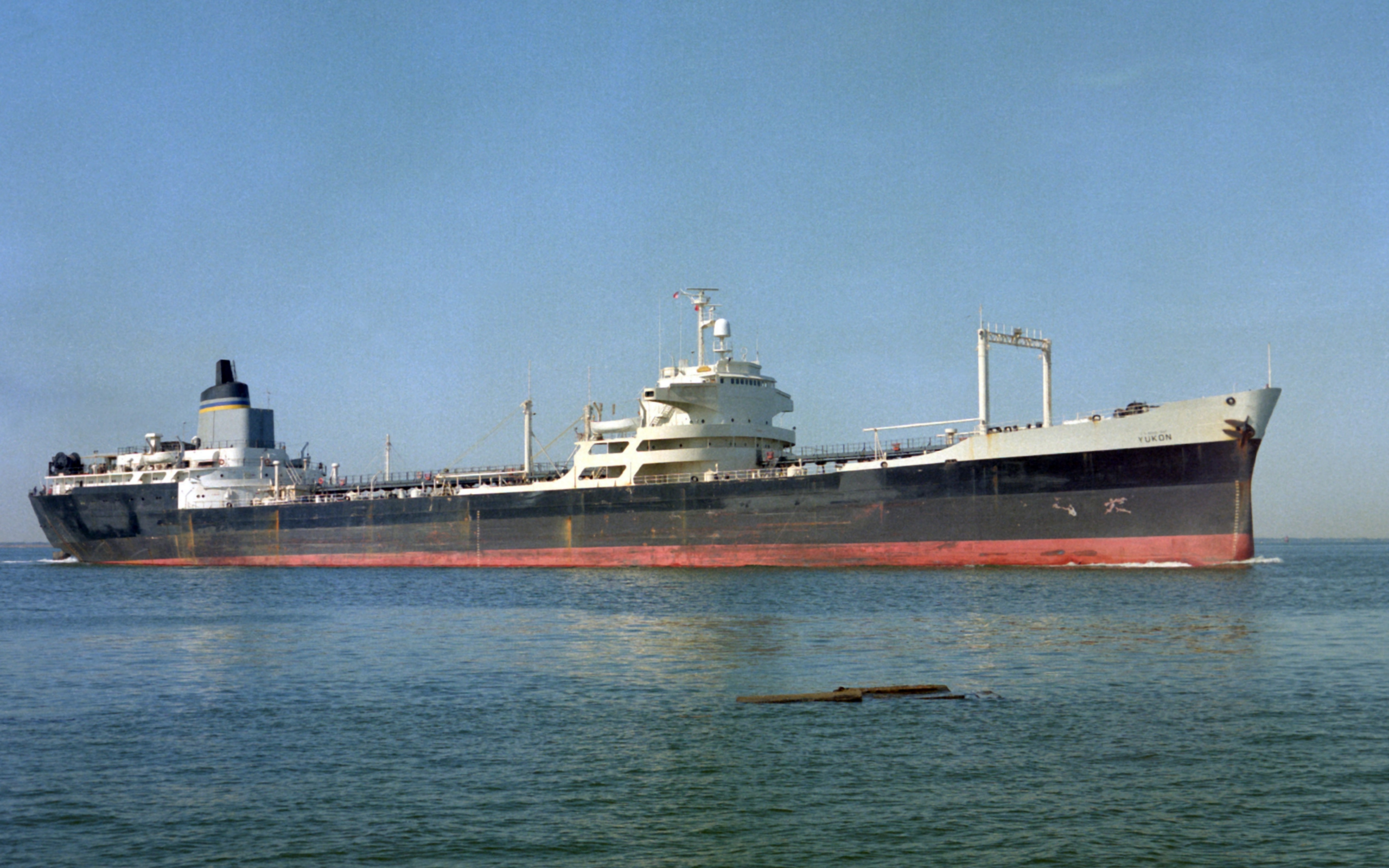
USNS Yukon (T-AOT-152)

The three survivors of this class were reclassified from Fleet Oilers (AO) to Transport Oilers (AOT).

- Maumee (T-AOT-149)
- Shoshone (T-AOT-151)
- Yukon (T-AOT-152)

=== American Explorer redesignated ===
American Explorer gained some notoriety in 2008 as a stricken hulk awaiting scrapping when she broke her moorings during Hurricane Gustav and collided with New Orleans' Florida Avenue Bridge.

- American Explorer (T-AOT-165), ex-T-AO-165

=== Sealift class redesignated ===
All were reclassified from Fleet Oilers (AO) to Transport Oilers (AOT).

- Sealift Pacific (T-AOT-168)
- Sealift Arabian Sea (T-AOT-169)
- Sealift China Sea (T-AOT-170)
- Sealift Indian Ocean (T-AOT-171)
- Sealift Atlantic (T-AOT-172)
- Sealift Mediterranean (T-AOT-173)
- Sealift Caribbean (T-AOT-174)
- Sealift Arctic (T-AOT-175)
- Sealift Antarctic (T-AOT-176)

=== Potomac redesignated ===
- Potomac (T-AOT-181), ex-Shenandoah, ex-T-AO-181

=== Falcon class redesignated ===
All were reclassified from Fleet Oilers (AO) to Transport Oilers (AOT).

- Columbia (T-AO-182), ex-Falcon Lady, later MV Mission Capistrano (T-AOT-5005)
- Neches (T-AO-183), ex-Falcon Duchess
- Hudson (T-AO-184), ex-Falcon Countess
- Susquehanna (T-AO-185), ex-Falcon Princess

=== Champion class ===
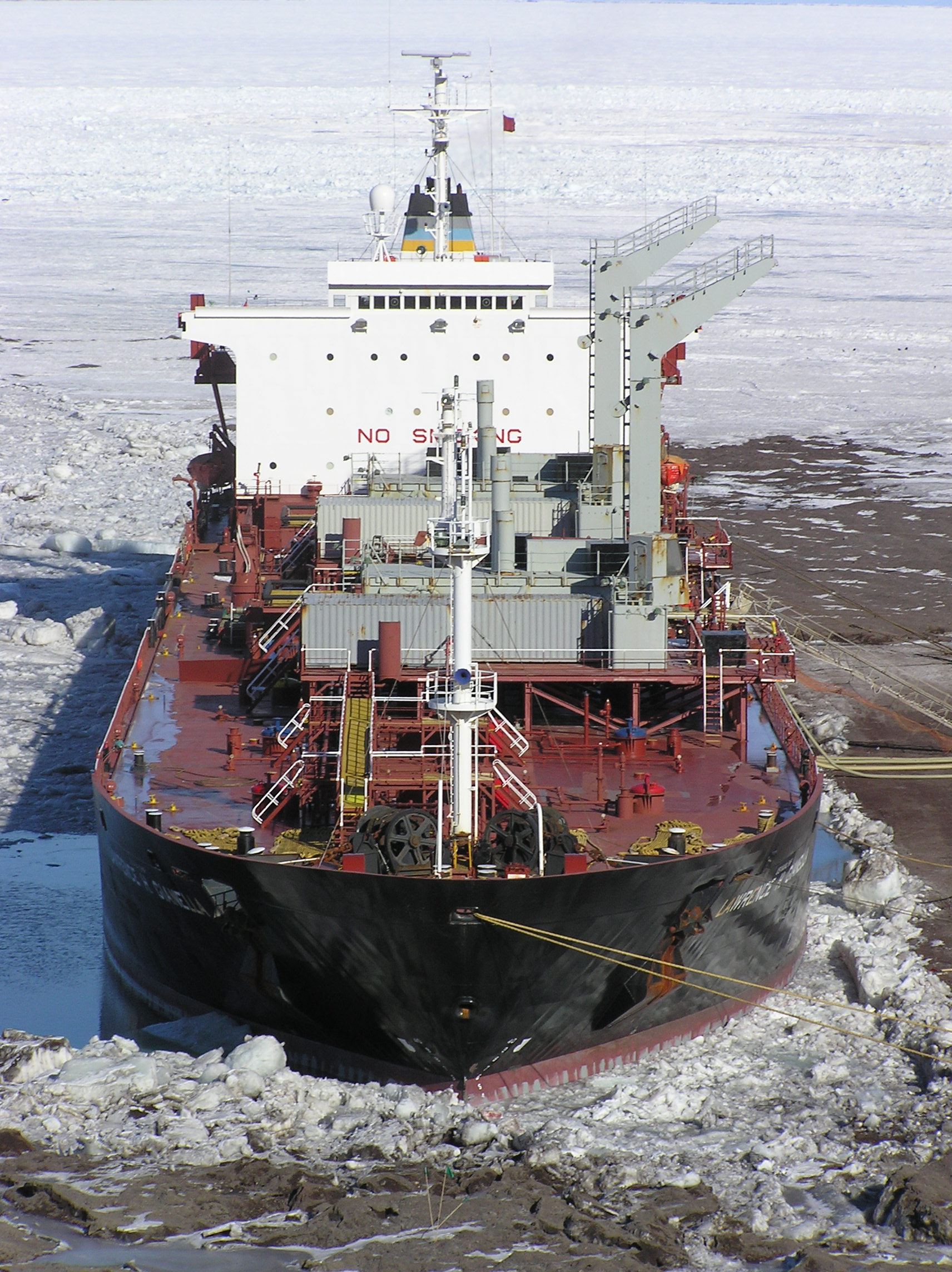
USNS Lawrence H. Gianella (T-AO-1125)

The five T5 Champion-class tankers had double hulls and were ice-strengthened for protection against damage during missions in extreme climates. They were built by the American Ship Building Company of Tampa, Fla., for Ocean Product Tankers of Houston, Texas, for long-term time charter to MSC, and entered service in 1985-87. These tankers embarked on many unique missions including refueling the National Science Foundation in Antarctica and Thule Air Base in Greenland. In 2003 MSC purchased four of the five outright, making them United States Naval Ships. Matthiesen was equipped for UNREP.

- USNS Gus W. Darnell (T-AOT-1121)
- USNS Paul Buck (T-AOT-1122)
- USNS Samuel L. Cobb (T-AOT-1123)
- USNS Richard G. Matthiesen (T-AOT-1124)
- USNS Lawrence H. Gianella (T-AOT-1125)

=== Overseas Alice Class ===
All ships of this class were leased by MSC and later returned to commercial service.

- ST Overseas Alice (AOT-1203) [I]
- ST Overseas Valdez (AOT-1204) [I]
- ST Overseas Vivian (AOT-1205) [I]

=== Other transport oilers ===
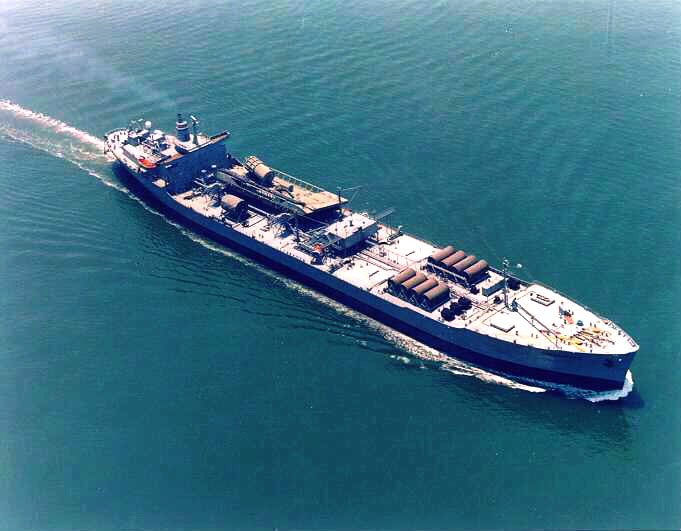
SS Chesapeake (AOT-5084), note the OPDS equipment on deck

In the 1980s MSC acquired several other merchant tankers for service in the Ready Reserve Force and/or Pre-Positioning Fleet. American Osprey, Mount Washington, Chesapeake and Petersburg were Offshore Petroleum Discharge System (OPDS) ships.

- SS Mission Buenaventura (T-AOT-1012), ex-Spirit of Liberty, built 1968, acquired 1987
- SS Mount Vernon (T-AOT-3009), built 1961, acquired 1988
- MV Mission Capistrano (T-AOT-5005), ex-Falcon Lady, ex-USNS Columbia (T-AOT-182), built 1971, reacquired 1988
- SS American Osprey (T-AOT-5075), ex-Gulf Prince, built 1958, acquired 1984
- SS Mount Washington (T-AOT-5076), built 1963, acquired 1987
- SS Chesapeake (T-AOT-5084), ex-Hess Voyager, built 1964, acquired 1987
- MT Empire State (T-AOT-5193) [A]
- MT Maersk Peary (T-AOT-5246) [A]
- MT SLNC Pax (T-AOT-5356) [A]
- ATB Galveston/Petrochem Producer (T-AOT-5406)
- MT SLNC Goodwill (T-AOT-5419) [A]
- MT Stena Polaris (T-AOT-5563) [A]
- SS Petersburg (T-AOT-9101), ex-Sinclair Texas, built 1962, acquired 1987
- MT Evergreen State [A]

== Oiler museums ==
There are no US Navy museum ships dedicated specifically to oilers. There is one model of an oiler that has been on display at the Defense Logistics Agency, in Fort Belvoir, Virginia. She is the Tamalpais (AO-96), named for a creek on a hill above Sausalito, California. In promoting the creation of an all 18 feet of the model can be seen.

== United States Navy facts ==
The following is a list of tanker or cargo type hulls:

=== Naval Fleet Auxiliary Force (NFAF) ===
These perform Underway Replenishment. The first two are oilers; the others are dry cargo ships.

- Fleet Replenishment Oilers - T-AO (15)
- Fast Combat Support Ships] T-AOE (4)
- Ammunition Ships T-AE (5)
- Combat Stores Ships - T-AFS (2)
- Dry Cargo/Ammunition Ships - T-AKE (7)

=== Prepositioning ships ===
- OPDS Tanker (formerly T-AOT) (1)

=== Sealift ships ===
- Tankers - T-AOT (5)

== See also ==
- Armadillo-class tankers - mobile base bulk storage ships classed as unclassified miscellaneous (IX)
- List of auxiliaries of the United States Navy § Gasoline Tankers (AOG, T-AOG)
- List of current ships of the United States Navy
- List of United States Navy ships
- List of United States Navy losses in World War II § Oilers (AO) - abbreviated list
- List of U.S. Navy ships sunk or damaged in action during World War II § Oiler (AO) - detailed list
- Tanker (ship)
