= Fort Cumberland =

Fort Cumberland may refer to:

== Places ==
- Fort Cumberland (Canada) also known as Fort Beauséjour, built by the French in 1752 and abandoned by the British in 1852
- Fort Cumberland (England), an existing pentagonal artillery fortification first erected in 1747 to guard the entrance to Langstone Harbour, east of the naval port of Portsmouth on the south coast of England
- Fort Cumberland (Maryland) (built 1754), an 18th-century frontier fort at the current site of Cumberland, Maryland, USA; an important military and economic center during the French and Indian War (1754–63); figured significantly in the early career of George Washington

== Other uses ==
- Battle of Fort Cumberland or Eddy's Rebellion, an attempt to bring the American Revolutionary War to Nova Scotia (now Canada) in late 1776.
- SS Fort Cumberland, any of a number of ships with this name
