= SS Fort Cumberland =

A number of steamships have carried the name Fort Cumberland:

- SS Fort Cumberland (1943) – a Fort ship
- SS Fort Cumberland (1944) – a Type T2-SE-A1 tanker
