= RFA Northmark =

Royal Navy vessel

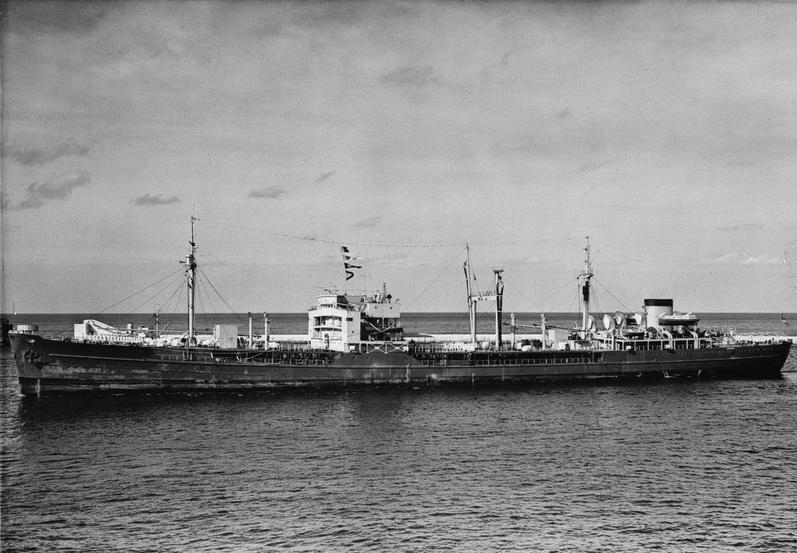
- HMS Bulawayo entering Grand Harbour, Malta

History

Germany
- Name: Nordmark
- Builder: Schichau-Werke, Danzig
- Laid down: 14 November 1936
- Launched: 5 October 1937 as Westerwald
- Commissioned: 6 January 1939 as Nordmark
- Fate: Captured, May 1945

United Kingdom
- Name: Northmark
- Acquired: May 1945
- Commissioned: July 1947, as HMS Bulawayo
- Decommissioned: October 1950
- Fate: Scrapped, 4 October 1955

General characteristics
- Displacement: 22,500 long tons (22,861 t) full load
- Length: 584 ft (178 m)
- Beam: 72 ft 6 in (22 m)
- Draught: 30 ft 3 in (9 m)
- Propulsion: Steam turbine with double reduction gearing, 21,590 shp (16,100 kW); 2 shafts
- Speed: 21 knots (39 km/h; 24 mph)
- Complement: 133 (German); 292 (British)

Nordmark (later Northmark) was a former Kriegsmarine (German navy) combination oiler and supply vessel which was allocated to the Royal Navy by the Inter-Allied Repatriations Commission when British forces entered Copenhagen on 9 May 1945.

== Design ==
To support naval operations in the Atlantic Ocean, the German Navy ran trials with various vessels in the 1920s and early 1930s. After testing two vessels of an intermediate type, the design evolved into the Dithmarschen-class. Six were built altogether, one of which was never completed. As Germany did not possess any ports on the Atlantic Ocean or any overseas bases, the Dithmarschen-class combined the roles fulfilled by tanker, repair ship, ammunition ship and dry cargo ship. The ships were even equipped with a small hospital. The main cargo were almost 9,000 tons of fuel oil and 400 tons of lubricating oil. As it was probable that the ships were underway for an extended time, the range was 12,500 NM (23,200 km) at 15 kn (28 km/h; 17 mph). The maximum speed was 23 knots. A heavy armament was fitted, consisting of three 15 cm/L48 guns, two 3,7 cm Flak and four 2 cm Flak anti-aircraft guns and eight machine guns.

== Construction ==
The ship was laid down at the Schichau-Werke shipyard in Elbing East Prussia (now Elbląg, Poland) on 14 November 1936, and was launched on 5 October 1937 with the name Westerwald. and was completed on 6 January 1939.

She arrived at Rosyth on 8 August 1945 and the following month went to Hebburn-on-Tyne for survey and repairs and conversion for service with the British Pacific Fleet, but the war ended and she was placed in reserve instead. She was renamed Northmark in January 1946 and was considered as a Royal Fleet Auxiliary-manned oiler, but the cost of modifications was considered to be unjustifiable and a follow-up proposal was taken up after approval was given to operate her as a naval ship. She therefore never served as an RFA, but was refitted for service in 1947 and on completion was renamed HMS Bulawayo in July 1947.

Bulawayo was involved in extensive trials of refueling at sea, particularly with alongside replenishment.

Bulawayo was scrapped in 1955.

== See also ==
- USS Conecuh (AOR-110)
