= USS Tallulah =

Oiler of the United States Navy

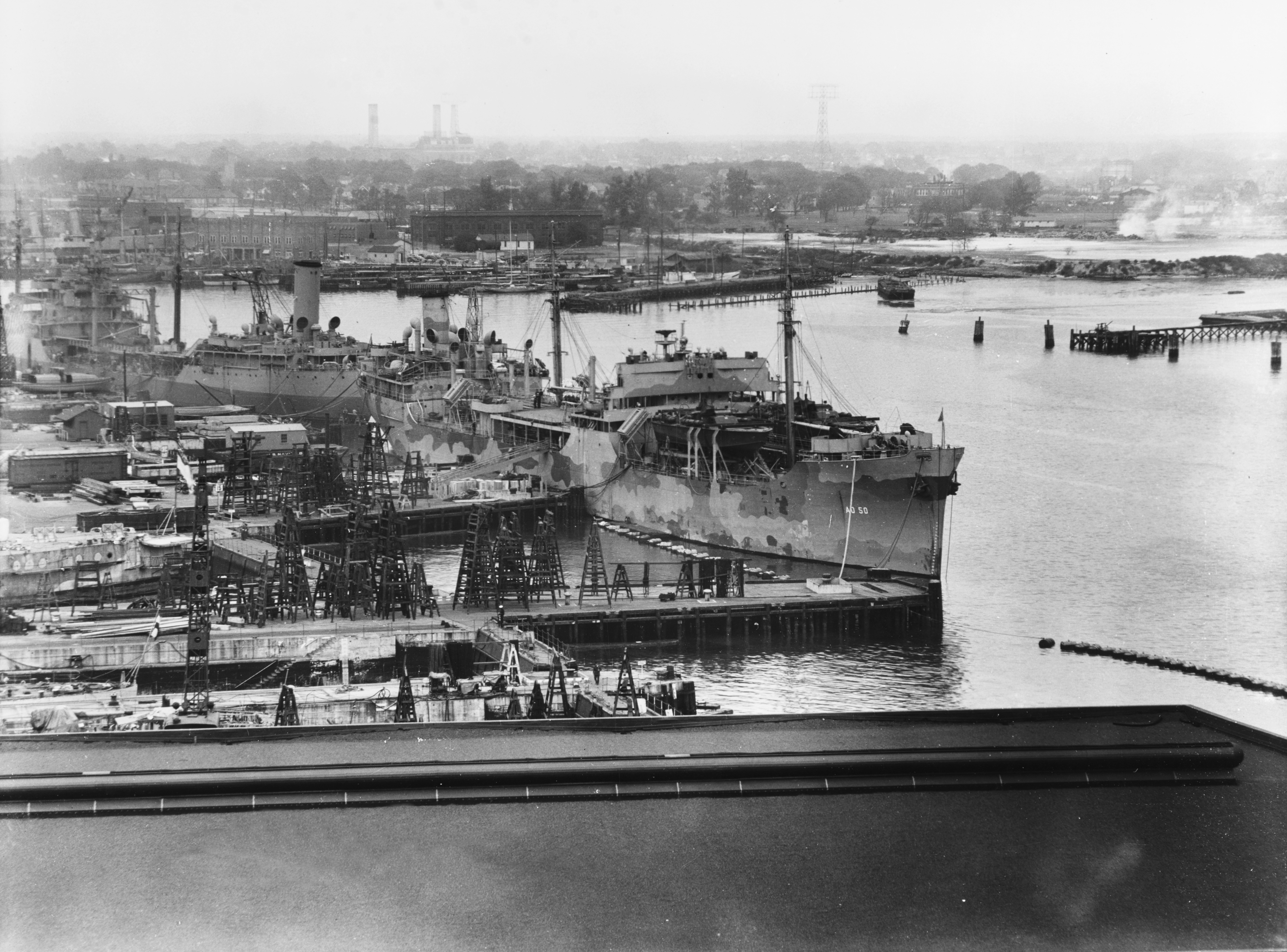
- USS Tallulah (AO-50) in October 1942

History

United States
- Name: USS Tallulah
- Namesake: Tallulah River in Georgia
- Builder: Sun Shipbuilding & Drydock Co., Chester, Pennsylvania
- Laid down: 1 December 1941
- Launched: 25 June 1942
- Acquired: 30 July 1942
- Commissioned: 5 September 1942
- Decommissioned: 2 April 1946
- Stricken: 3 October 1946
- Acquired: 2 February 1948
- In service: 1 October 1949, as USNS Tallulah (T-AO-50)
- Out of service: May 1975
- Stricken: 31 March 1986
- Identification: IMO number: 7737418
- Honors and awards: 7 battle stars (World War II); 1 battle star (Korea)
- Fate: Sold for scrapping, 2 February 1987

General characteristics
- Type: Suamico-class fleet replenishment oiler
- Displacement: 5,782 long tons (5,875 t) light; 21,880 long tons (22,231 t) full
- Length: 523 ft 6 in (159.56 m)
- Beam: 68 ft (21 m)
- Draft: 30 ft (9.1 m)
- Propulsion: Turbo-electric, single screw, 8,000 hp (5,966 kW)
- Speed: 15.5 knots (28.7 km/h; 17.8 mph)
- Capacity: 140,000 barrels (22,000 m^{3})
- Complement: 251
- Armament: 1 × 5"/38 caliber gun; 4 × 3"/50 caliber guns; 4 × twin 40 mm AA guns; 4 × twin 20 mm AA guns

USS Tallulah (AO-50), originally named the SS Valley Forge, was a Type T2-SE-A1 Suamico-class fleet oiler of the United States Navy.

The ship was laid down on 1 December 1941 under a Maritime Commission contract (MC hull 321) at Chester, Pennsylvania, by the Sun Shipbuilding & Drydock Co.; launched on 25 June 1942; sponsored by Mrs. H. Bowring; acquired by the Navy on 30 July 1942; and commissioned on 5 September 1942.

== Service history ==
=== 1942 ===
After fitting out at New York, she conducted shakedown training out of Norfolk. Tallulah got underway for New York on 17 October 1942 with oiler Chemung (AO-30), and destroyers Jenkins (DD-447), and Chevalier (DD-451). A week later, she departed New York in company with 32 merchant ships escorted by British destroyer HMS Havelock and four corvettes and proceeded via Guantánamo Bay, Cuba, and Aruba, toward Panama. She transited the canal on 9 November and remained at Balboa for three days. On the 12th, she headed westward — via Bora Bora in the Society Islands — to New Caledonia. Tallulah remained in Nouméa from 12 to 19 December; then made her way to the west coast, arriving at San Francisco on 4 January 1943.

=== 1943 ===
Over the next year, she made five more round-trip voyages to the South Pacific. On three of these, the oiler carried aircraft in addition to her usual oil cargo. On the first of the five, from 4 January until 19 March, the oiler visited the Solomon Islands, in addition to New Caledonia and Espiritu Santo. On 15 February, just after she had gotten underway for Guadalcanal, one of her escorts reported and attacked a submarine contact. Late that afternoon, Japanese torpedo bombers dove on the convoy in singles and pairs; but the Allied ships maneuvered radically and put up a hail of anti-aircraft fire. Tallulah suffered no hits, and the closest torpedo passed 12 yards (11 m) astern. For the day's action, her gunners claimed one aircraft shot down and two more possible kills. She arrived off Lunga Point and commenced fueling operations on the 18th. For the next week, she moved between Guadalcanal, Florida Island, and Tulagi, fueling the ships supporting the struggle for Guadalcanal. On 27 February, she reached Espiritu Santo and, three days later, headed back toward the United States.

The middle three voyages were largely uneventful. She sailed from the west coast carrying oil, stores, and planes to various bases in the South Pacific. In addition to Nouméa, the oiler visited Samoa, Fiji, and Efate. On 16 October, she departed San Pedro, California, on her fifth and last round-trip voyage; arrived in Havannah Harbor, Efate Island, on 5 November; and remained there for eight days, fueling the ships in the harbor. On the 13th, she got underway for fueling-at-sea operations en route to Funafuti in the Ellice Islands, where she anchored four days later. From 19 to 21 November, she was again at sea fueling Task Group (TG) 50.4. Following four more days fueling ships at Funafuti, she stood out of port to replenish the tanks of warships supporting the invasion of the Gilbert Islands during the first week in December. Upon completion of that task, the oiler headed, via Pearl Harbor, back to San Pedro, California.

=== 1944 ===
On 13 January 1944, following a brief overhaul, she once more departed the west coast. This time, however, her destination was the Central Pacific. During the next five months, Tallulah shuttled oil and cargo from Pearl Harbor to the forward anchorage established at newly won Majuro Atoll. By early June, anchorages had also been established farther west at Kwajalein and Eniwetok. On 3 June, she departed Majuro and, after a stopover at Kwajalein from 4 to 13 June, arrived in Eniwetok on the 14th. The next day, she put to sea to fuel elements of the 5th Fleet just prior to the Philippine Sea phase of the Marianas campaign. During that battle, the carriers of Task Force 58 broke the back of Japanese sea-borne air power once and for all. Two days after the great air battle, she refueled TG 58.3, built around the two carriers, Enterprise (CV-6) and Lexington (CV-16). From 1 to 27 July, she conducted fueling operations in and around Eniwetok; then headed for the west coast.

Steaming via Pearl Harbor, Tallulah reached Terminal Island, California, on 11 August and began overhaul. She stood out again on 26 September and, after fueling-at-sea practice en route, reentered Pearl Harbor on 4 October. She remained overnight and, the following morning, continued on toward the western Pacific. After a stop at Eniwetok on the night of 13 and 14 October, she reached Ulithi on the 19th. On 4 November, she put to sea again to support the Leyte assault. Tallulah returned to the lagoon at Ulithi on 17 November and remained until the 23rd.

On the 20th, while she was still in Ulithi lagoon, the anchorage was subjected to a kaiten attack. At least three of the one-man undersea raiders were sunk. The oiler Mississinewa (AO-59), anchored off Tallulah's starboard bow, took a hit just before 0600 and, by 0900, was at the bottom of the lagoon. Tallulah shifted berths to avoid flame and flying debris while members of her crew assisted the survivors of the sunken ship.

On 23 November, the oiler headed for Hollandia, New Guinea, where she spent a month in exercises and fueling operations. She departed New Guinea on 30 December and steamed — via Mangarin Bay, Mindoro — to Lingayen Gulf, Luzon.

=== 1945 ===
She supported the Luzon invasion until late January 1945 when she returned to Ulithi. On 1 February, Tallulah was transferred from the 7th to the 5th Fleet for the Iwo Jima invasion. She put to sea on the 16th and conducted fueling-at-sea operations until 3 March, when she returned to Ulithi for upkeep. Ten days later, she exited the lagoon again and resumed fueling the fleet, still operating off Iwo Jima and preparing to soften Okinawa.

For the remainder of World War II, Tallulah operated from the base at Ulithi in support of the invasion forces at Okinawa and of the Fast Carrier Task Force during its strikes against Japan and her outposts in China and Southeast Asia. She returned to Ulithi periodically for upkeep and to take on fresh supplies of oil. Then with her tanks full, she carried her precious cargo to the fighting forces. In addition to Ulithi, she visited the base at Leyte Gulf, the forward base at Kerama Retto — located just to the west of Okinawa — and Buckner Bay at the island itself.

The war in the Pacific ended on 15 August, while Tallulah was conducting fueling operations at Buckner Bay. She made one more round-trip voyage to Ulithi and back, between 17 August and 1 September; then sailed north on the 20th to fuel ships operating in the vicinity of Jinsen, Korea. During the ensuing three months, she visited China — at Taku Bar, the Gulf of Pohai, and Tsingtao — as well as Nagoya, Kure, Yokohama, and Yokosuka in Japan. On 14 December, Tallulah stood out of Yokohama and headed for Pearl Harbor and home.

=== 1946–1975 ===
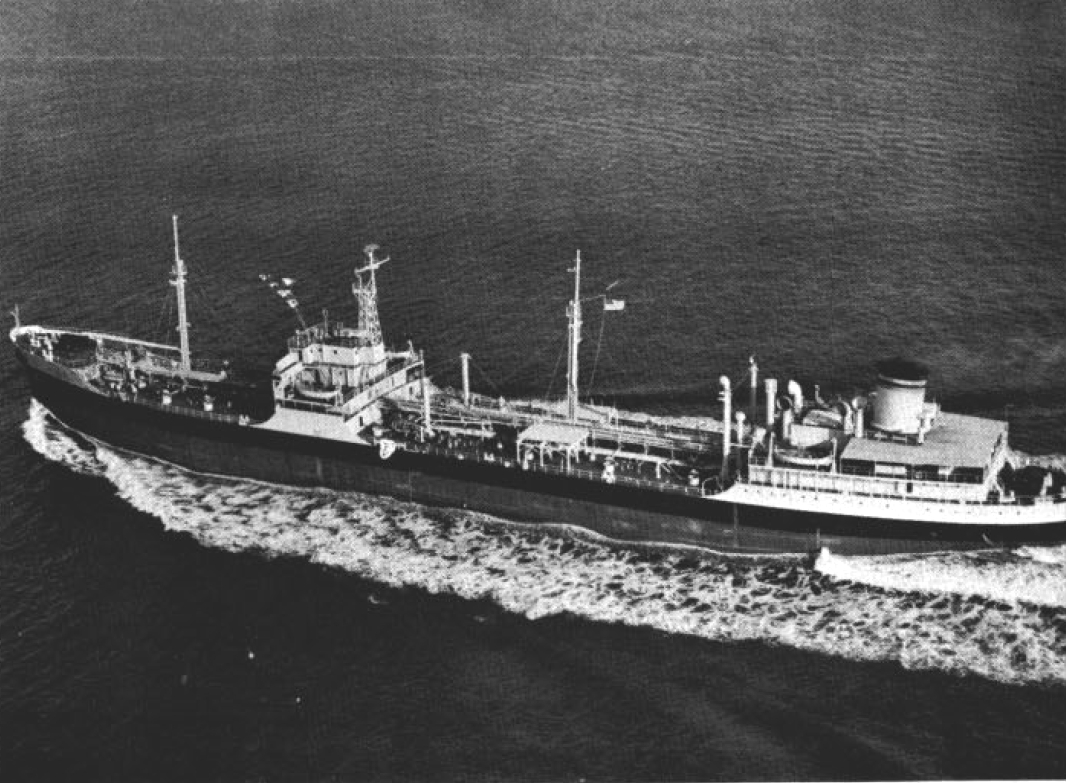
Tallulah underway, circa 1964.

Soon after her return to the United States, Tallulah was decommissioned on 2 April 1946. On 3 October, she was turned over to the War Shipping Administration; and her name was struck from the Navy List. However, on 2 February 1948, she was reacquired by the Navy and, on 1 October 1949, transferred to the Military Sea Transportation Service (now the Military Sealift Command) to serve as USNS Tallulah (T-AO-50), later redesignated T-AOT-50. Crewed by civilians, she plied the oceans of the world, visited most major ports, and kept the Navy supplied with oil and other important liquid cargoes, seeing service in the Korean War in early 1952.

Tallulah was placed out of service and assigned to the Maritime Administration fleet at James River, Virginia, in May 1975. The ship was struck from the Navy List on 31 March 1986, and disposed of by MARAD, on 2 February 1987.

== Awards ==
Tallulah earned seven battle stars during World War II, and one battle star for Korean War service.
