= USNS Cedar Creek =

Oiler of the United States Navy

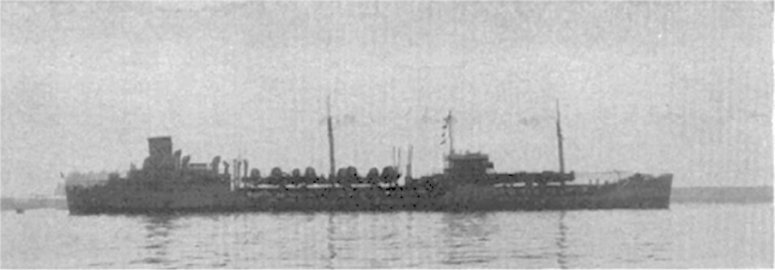
- USNS Cedar Creek

History

United States
- Name: USNS Cedar Creek
- Builder: Sun Shipbuilding and Dry Dock Company
- Laid down: 20 September 1943
- Launched: 15 December 1943
- In service: 1943
- Out of service: 1954
- Stricken: 1956
- Fate: Scrapped 1975

General characteristics
- Class & type: Suamico-class oiler
- Displacement: 21,880 tons (full)
- Length: 523 Feet, 6 Inches
- Beam: 68 feet
- Draft: 30 feet
- Propulsion: Turbo-electric, single screw. 8,000hp
- Armament: one 5"/38 dual-purpose gun mount; four 3"/50 guns; four twin 40 mm gun mounts; four twin 20 mm gun mounts

USNS Cedar Creek (T-AO-138) was a Suamico-class Fleet Oiler that served both the United States Navy and the Soviet Union from 1943 to 1954. She was stricken from the Naval Vessel Register in 1957 and scrapped in September 1975.

== Ship History ==
Cedar Creek was laid down on 20 September 1943, as a Type T2-SE-A1 tanker hull under Maritime Commission contract at Sun Shipbuilding and Drydock Company in Pennsylvania. She was launched on 15 December 1943 and subsequently delivered to the Maritime Commission on 27 December 1943.

=== Soviet Union ===
On 30 April 1944, she was lent to the Union of Soviet Socialist Republics (USSR) as SS Taganrog under the Lend-Lease Program. She served under their jurisdiction until she was returned to the Maritime Commission in March 1948.

=== U.S. Service ===
Taganrog was acquired by the U.S. Navy in July 1948, where she was redesignated as (AO-138) and operated under charter for the Naval Transportation Service. In October 1949, she was assigned to the Military Sea Transportation Service as USNS Cedar Creek (T-AO-138) and continued operations with a civilian crew. On 28 September 1954, she was placed in the National Defense Reserve Fleet at San Diego, California and remained there until 1 November 1956—after which she was transferred again to the MSTS.

=== Fate ===
She was stricken from the Naval Vessel Register and turned over to the Maritime Administration on 14 October 1957. She was sold for its scrap on 2 September 1975 to Zidell Explorations Inc. for $261,898.99.

== Ship Awards ==
The Cedar Creek was awarded the National Defense Service Medal for its honorable service during the Korean War.
