= USNS Abiqua =

History

United States
- Builder: Alabama Drydock and Shipbuilding Company, Mobile, Alabama
- Laid down: 18 June 1943
- Launched: 31 October 1943
- Sponsored by: Mrs. George Bliss Jones
- In service: 21 December 1956
- Out of service: 30 September 1967
- Identification: IMO number: 5001334
- Fate: Cut into four sections, and joined to form SS Windsor, SS Bear Paw and the tank barge Tex-Mar XIX

General characteristics
- Class & type: Suamico-class fleet oiler
- Displacement: 10,536 t.
- Length: 504 ft (154 m)
- Beam: 68 ft 2 in (20.78 m)
- Draft: 39 ft 2 in (11.94 m)
- Propulsion: turbo-electric, single screw. 8,000hp.
- Speed: 15.5 kts.
- Capacity: 140,000 barrels
- Armament: none

Abiqua (MC hull 548) was laid down on 18 June 1943 by the Alabama Drydock and Shipbuilding Company, Mobile, Alabama.; launched on 22 September 1943; sponsored by Mrs. George Bliss Jones; and delivered to the Cities Service Company for operation on 31 October 1943.

Abiqua was among the ships transferred by the Maritime Administration to the Navy in response to the Suez crisis of 1956. She was accepted by the Military Sea Transportation Service (MSTS) on 21 December 1956 but operated for MSTS by a civilian crew under contract with a commercial firm listed as Matra-lines, but not further identified.

As the crisis subsided, Abiqua was returned to the Maritime Administration and struck from the Navy list on 30 September 1957. Following her deactivation, Abiqua returned to the Alabama Drydock and Shipbuilding Co., Mobile, Ala. The afterpart of Abiqua was joined to the forepart of SS Windsor (formerly Bear Paw) to form a dry cargo ship which retained the name Abiqua. The old forepart of Abiqua was joined to the afterpart of Windsor to form a storage vessel which was renamed Bear Paw. The bow and midbody from Abiqua were towed to the Bethlehem Beaumont Shipyard., at Beaumont, Tex., and converted into a tank barge, which was renamed Tide Mar XIX.
