= USS Cowanesque =

Oiler of the United States Navy

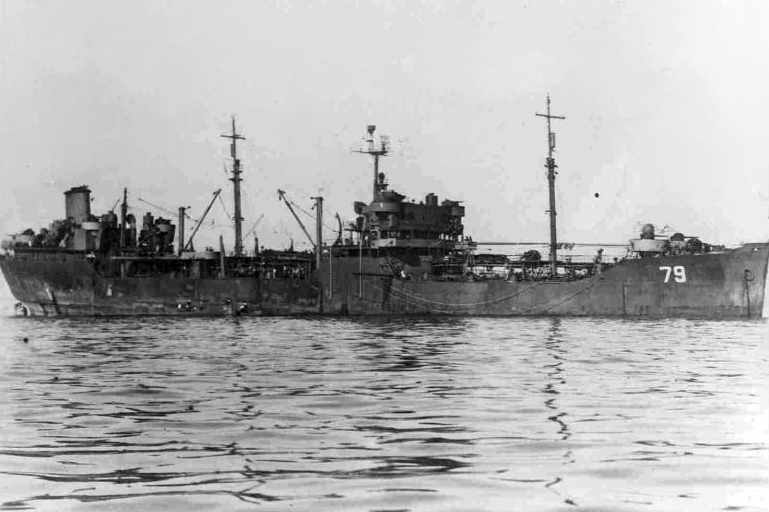

History

United States
- Name: USS Cowanesque
- Namesake: Cowanesque River in Pennsylvania
- Builder: Sun Shipbuilding & Drydock Co., Chester, Pennsylvania
- Launched: 11 March 1943
- Acquired: 25 March 1943
- Commissioned: 1 May 1943
- Decommissioned: 30 January 1946
- Honors and awards: 2 battle stars (World War II)
- Fate: Sunk, 23 April 1972

General characteristics
- Type: Suamico-class fleet replenishment oiler
- Displacement: 5,782 long tons (5,875 t) light; 21,880 long tons (22,231 t) full
- Length: 523 ft 6 in (159.56 m)
- Beam: 68 ft (21 m)
- Draft: 30 ft (9.1 m)
- Propulsion: Turbo-electric, single screw, 8,000 hp (5,966 kW)
- Speed: 15.5 knots (28.7 km/h; 17.8 mph)
- Capacity: 140,000 barrels (22,000 m^{3})
- Complement: 232 to 251
- Armament: 1 × 5-inch/38-caliber gun; 4 × 3-inch/50-caliber guns; 4 × twin 40 mm AA guns; 4 × twin 20 mm AA guns

USS Cowanesque (AO-79) was a Type T2-SE-A1 Suamico-class fleet oiler of the United States Navy during World War II.

The ship was built by the Sun Shipbuilding and Drydock Co. in Chester, Pennsylvania as hull number 315 and USMC number 308 in 1943. Launched on 11 March 1943, as SS Fort Duquesne, sponsored by Mrs. M. Hitchner, the ship was acquired by the Navy on 25 March 1943 and commissioned on 1 May 1943.

== Service history ==
=== World War II, 1943–1946 ===
From 15 June 1943 to 1 March 1944, Cowanesque carried gasoline from the Texas oil ports to east coast bases. She departed Norfolk on 4 March on the first of two convoy voyage to Casablanca and Mers El Kébir. Sailing from Norfolk on 14 July, she arrived at Oran on 30 July and remained at Mers El Kébir until 4 September, fueling United States and Allied shipping. She returned to Norfolk on 19 September.

Cowanesque put to sea from Norfolk on 22 October 1944 and arrived at Pearl Harbor on 28 November. She continued to the forward area calling at Eniwetok, Ulithi, and Hollandia, and arrived in San Pedro Bay, Philippines, on 1 January 1945 to fuel units of the 7th Fleet.

The next day her task group underwent a severe air attack. Cowanesque fired at several planes and shot down at least two before a single-engine fighter crashed into her port side and disintegrated violently (believed to be a kamikaze attack), spreading burning gasoline over the deck. Damage control parties dumped the unexploded bomb from the plane over the side, brought the fires under control and repaired the damage enabling Cowanesque to continue her mission. Her casualties were two dead, two wounded. Cowanesque fueled ships at Mindoro, Lingayen Gulf, and San Pedro Bay until 25 February when she sailed for Ulithi.

From 19 March to 4 July 1945 Cowanesque operated out of Ulithi refueling ships of the 5th Fleet at sea in support of the Iwo Jima and Okinawa operations. She reported to Okinawa on 8 July for convoy duty between that island and Ulithi until the end of the war, and continued to base on Okinawa as she supported the occupation. Among her duties was refueling ships sweeping mines in the Yellow Sea. On 28 October, she sailed for San Francisco, arriving on 15 November. Cowanesque was placed out of commission 30 January 1946 and transferred to the Maritime Commission.

=== 1948–1972 ===
Reacquired by the Navy, and reinstated on the Naval Vessel Register, on 18 January 1948, she served with the Naval Transportation Service as Cowanesque (AO-79). Transferred to the Military Sea Transportation Service on 1 October 1949, the ship was placed in service in noncommissioned status as USNS Cowanesque (T-AO-79) on 18 July 1950. She was reclassified as Transport Oiler (T-AOT-79) (date unknown). The ship was sunk off Okinawa on 23 April 1972.

== Awards ==
Cowanesque received two battle stars for World War II service.

Awards, Citations and Campaign Ribbons

Top Row – Combat Action Ribbon (3 Jan 45) – American Campaign Medal Second Row – Europe-Africa-Middle East Campaign Medal – Asiatic-Pacific Campaign Medal (2) – World War II Victory Medal Third Row – Navy Occupation Service Medal (with Asia clasp) – National Defense Service Medal – Philippines Liberation Medal

Personnel Awards

Purple Heart (2-KIA, 2WIA 3 January 1945)
