= USS Shikellamy =

History

United States
- Laid down: as SS E. W. Sinclair
- Launched: 26 March 1921
- Completed: April 1921
- Acquired: 26 March 1943
- Commissioned: 11 April 1943
- Decommissioned: 17 January 1946
- Stricken: February 1946
- Fate: Returned to the Maritime Commission

General characteristics
- Displacement: 10,800 t.(lt)
- Length: 391 ft 6 in (119.33 m)
- Beam: 53 ft (16 m)
- Draught: 23 ft 11 in (7.29 m)
- Speed: 9.5 kts
- Complement: 62
- Armament: one single 5 in (130 mm) dual purpose gun mount, four 40 mm guns

USS Shikellamy (AO-90/AOG-47) was a Shikellamy-class gasoline tanker acquired by the U.S. Navy for use in World War II. She had the dangerous task of supplying fuel to ships and stations in the submarine-infested Pacific Ocean.

Shikellamy (AO-90) was the former merchant tanker SS Daniel Pierce, owned and operated by the Sinclair Refining Co., New York City. She was acquired by the Navy through the War Shipping Administration on 26 March 1943, on a bare-boat basis. The tanker was converted for Navy use by the Tampa Shipbuilding Co., Tampa, Florida, and placed in commission as Shikellamy (AO-90) on 11 April 1943.

== Pre-operations testing ==
Shikellamy sailed for Balboa, Panama Canal Zone, and remained in drydock there from 21 June to 15 July. Her classification was also changed on 15 July from AO-90 to AOG-47. She passed back through the canal on 22 July to test her steering. Two days later, she retransited the canal and sailed directly to Sydney, Australia, arriving on 28 August.

== World War II South Pacific operations ==
She joined a convoy on 11 September and steamed to Brisbane, Australia. Shikellamy delivered oil and cargo from Brisbane to Port Moresby, New Guinea, in October and November. She returned to Brisbane for voyage repairs on 28 November 1943 and cleared that port on 2 January 1944 to replenish fleet units at Port Moresby and Milne Bay. The oiler made four more replenishment voyages to New Guinea in the following months. On 12 April, the oiler changed her base of operations to the New Guinea area. She operated there until 22 November when she sailed for San Pedro Bay, Leyte, Philippine Islands.

== Philippine area operations ==
Shikellamy returned to Yos Sudarso Bay (Humboldt Bay) on 10 December and, nine days later, sailed for San Pedro Bay again to base her operations there. The oiler operated in the Philippine Islands from 28 November 1944 until October 1945 when she sailed for New Orleans, Louisiana, via the Panama Canal, for disposal.

== Post-war decommissioning ==
Shikellamy was decommissioned at New Orleans on 17 January 1946, struck from the Navy list on 7 February and returned by the War Shipping Administration to her original owner.
