= USNS Petrolite =

History

United States
- Name: USNS Petrolite
- Builder: Sun Shipbuilding & Drydock Co., Chester, Pennsylvania
- Laid down: 12 October 1943
- Launched: 13 January 1944
- Acquired: 31 January 1944
- In service: November 1956
- Out of service: 5 September 1957
- Stricken: 5 September 1957
- Identification: IMO number: 5276458
- Fate: Sold into commercial service, 18 April 1969; sold for scrap, 19 October 1984

General characteristics
- Type: Suamico-class fleet oiler
- Displacement: 5,782 long tons (5,875 t) light; 21,880 long tons (22,231 t) full
- Length: 523 ft 6 in (159.56 m)
- Beam: 68 ft (21 m)
- Draft: 30 ft (9.1 m)
- Propulsion: Turbo-electric, single screw, 8,000 hp (5,966 kW)
- Speed: 15.5 knots (28.7 km/h; 17.8 mph)
- Capacity: 140,000 barrels (22,000 m^{3})
- Complement: 251
- Armament: None

USNS Petrolite (T-AO-164) was a Suamico-class T2 tanker laid down on 12 October 1943 under Maritime Commission contract (MC hull 1723). The ship was built at Sun Shipbuilding and Drydock Co. in Chester, Pennsylvania (hull number 390). Launched on 13 January 1944; the ship was delivered to the United States Navy at Philadelphia Naval Shipyard on 31 January 1944.

== Service history ==
=== World War II, 1944–1945 ===
As SS Hanging Rock she operating briefly out of Philadelphia, transporting oil between various east coast ports. Transferring her operations to the Pacific during the closing months of the war, she transported oil to many of America's island bastions. With the end of hostilities she was laid up in the Maritime Commission Reserve Fleet at Puget Sound, Olympia, Washington, and renamed Petrolite in 1946.

=== Re-activation, 1956–1957 ===
In November 1956 the tanker was activated by the Maritime Commission for charter to the Military Sea Transportation Service as USNS Petrolite (T–AO–164). She operated under contract with a civilian crew until 5 September 1957, when she was struck from the Navy List and again laid up with the Maritime Administration Reserve Fleet at Olympia.

=== Disposal ===
Petrolite was sold to Sea-Land Service, Inc., on 18 April 1969 and converted into a containerized cargo ship at Todd Shipyards Corp., San Francisco. When completed, it was renamed Seattle. She was sold for scrap, 19 October 1984.
