= USS Conecuh (AOR-110) =

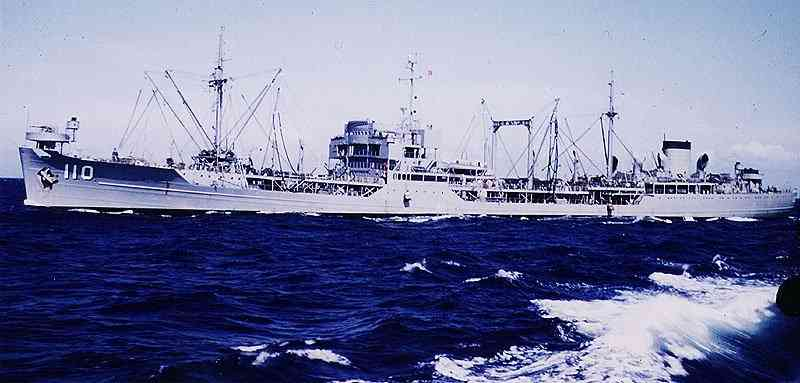
- Conecuh underway, October 1946

History

Nazi Germany
- Name: Dithmarschen
- Builder: Schichau-Werke, Danzig
- Laid down: 6 June 1936
- Launched: 12 June 1937
- Commissioned: 20 July 1939
- Fate: Captured, May 1945

United States
- Name: USS Conecuh
- Namesake: Conecuh River in Alabama
- Acquired: 15 January 1946
- In service: 2 May 1946, as USS Dithmarschen (IX-301)
- Out of service: 24 October 1946
- Renamed: USS Conecuh, 1 October 1946
- Reclassified: AO-110 (Fleet Oiler), 1 October 1946
- Commissioned: 16 February 1953
- Decommissioned: 3 April 1956
- Reclassified: AOR-110 (Replenishment Oiler), 4 September 1952
- Stricken: 1 June 1960
- Fate: Transferred to the Maritime Commission, 3 April 1956

General characteristics
- Type: Replenishment oiler
- Displacement: 8,820 long tons (8,962 t)
- Length: 584 ft (178 m)
- Beam: 72 ft (22 m)
- Draft: 31 ft (9.4 m)
- Propulsion: four MAN nine-cylinder Diesel, two shafts, 22,000 shaft horsepower (16,000 kW)
- Speed: 23 knots (43 km/h; 26 mph)
- Range: 12500 nm (23200 km) at 15 kn
- Complement: 284
- Armament: 3 x 150 mm, 2 x 37 mm, 4 x 20 mm; 8 × 40 mm guns (U.S. Navy)

USS Conecuh (AOR-110) was a fleet replenishment tanker, originally built by F. Schichau, Danzig, in 1938 as a combination oiler and supply vessel or "Troßschiff" for the Kriegsmarine and christened as Dithmarschen. Taken over by British authorities at Bremerhaven when World War II ended, Dithmarschen was allocated to the United States Navy on 15 January 1946 by the Inter-Allied Reparations Commission.

== Design ==
Bureau of Ships plan of the ship's upper deck

Bureau of Ships plan of the ship's lower deck

To support naval operations in the Atlantic Ocean, the German Navy ran trials with various vessels in the 1920s and early 1930s. After testing two vessels of an intermediate type, the design evolved into the Dithmarschen-class. Six were built altogether, one of which was never completed. As Germany did not possess any ports on the Atlantic Ocean or any overseas bases, the Dithmarschen-class combined the roles fulfilled by tanker, repair ship, ammunition ship and dry cargo ship. The ships were even equipped with a small hospital. The main cargo were almost 9,000 tons of fuel oil and 400 tons of lubricating oil. As it was probable that the ships were underway for an extended time, the range was 12,500 nm at 15 knots. The maximum speed was 23 knots. A heavy armament was fitted, consisting of three 15 cm/L48 guns, two 3,7 cm and four 20 mm anti-aircraft guns and eight machine guns.

== Name ==
Dithmarschen, or Ditmarsh (in the oldest form of the name Thiatmaresgaho, Dietmar's Gau), a territory between the Eider, the Elbe and the North Sea. In U.S. service, her name was changed to Conecuh on 1 October 1946, after the Conecuh River in Alabama.

== Service history ==
=== German Navy ===
Dithmarschen was being overhauled at the beginning of World War II. From June to November 1940, she supported the battleships Scharnhorst and Gneisenau during Operation Weserübung, the invasion of Norway. In November, she refueled the cruiser Admiral Hipper during her operations in the Atlantic Ocean. Scharnhorst and Gneisenau were again supported in the Atlantic Ocean during Operation Berlin in early 1941. Between October 1941 and December 1942, Dithmarschen operated in the Baltic Sea, supporting German ships during Operation Barbarossa. For the remainder of the war, she operated off Norway. At the end of the war, she had returned to Bremerhaven, where she was taken over by the British.

=== U.S. Navy ===
Dithmarschen was allocated to United States 15 January 1946. She was placed in service 2 May 1946 as USS Dithmarschen (IX-301) with Captain A. W. Maddox, USNR, in charge. Departing Bremerhaven 8 May she arrived at Philadelphia Naval Shipyard 19 May for conversion to a naval vessel. The need for a one-stop oiler-replenishment type ship had been illustrated by the war in the Pacific, and Dithmarschen was used for experimental work in this field since she had been developed specifically for this type of duty. She was redesignated AO-110 on 1 October 1946 (the construction of USS Conecuh (AO-103) had been cancelled on 18 August 1945), but lack of funds delayed her conversion and she was placed out of service on 24 October.

Her classification was changed to AOR-110 on 4 September 1952 and she was converted to a fleet replenishment tanker. Conecuh was commissioned 16 February 1953, Commander M. B. Freeman in command. Following her shakedown in the Virginia Capes, she steamed to Greenock, Scotland to take part in NATO Operation "Mariner" (16 September-20 October). She sailed for a tour of duty with the 6th Fleet in the Mediterranean (5 March-28 May 1954), then underwent an extensive overhaul at Norfolk (30 June 1954 – 4 January 1955). She remained at Norfolk except for refueling units at sea, operations in the Caribbean, and off the Florida Keys (25 October-7 November 1955), until decommissioned and transferred to the Maritime Commission for retention in the Maritime Reserve Fleet 3 April 1956. She was stricken from the Naval Register on 1 June 1960 and sold for scrap the same year.

Conecuh proved the feasibility of the combination oiler-replenishment ship; experience gained during her operations led to the development of the fast combat support ship (AOE) in the United States Navy.

== See also ==
- RFA Northmark
- List of auxiliaries of the United States Navy

== Bibliography ==
- "Conecuh". Dictionary of American Naval Fighting Ships. Archived from the original on March 13, 2004.
- Wildenberg, Thomas (1996). Gray Steel and Black Oil: Fast Tankers and Replenishment at Sea in the U.S. Navy, 1912-1995. Annapolis, M: Naval Institute Press. ISBN 1-55750-934-4.
