= USNS Cumberland =

History

United States
- Name: USNS Cumberland (T-AO-153)
- Namesake: Cumberland, Maryland
- Owner: United States Navy
- Operator: Military Sealift Command
- Launched: 9 May 1944
- Completed: May 1944
- Fate: Scrapped 1972

General characteristics
- Class & type: Type T2-SE-A1 tanker
- Displacement: 5,782 tons(light) 21,880 tons (full)
- Length: 523 ft 6 in (159.56 m)
- Beam: 68 ft (21 m)
- Draft: 30 ft (9.1 m)
- Propulsion: Turbo-electric, single screw propeller. 8,000hp
- Speed: 15.5 knots
- Capacity: 140,000 barrels
- Complement: 251

The SS Fort Cumberland was one of the nearly 500 Type T2-SE-A1 tankers ordered by the Maritime Commission during World War II. She was named for the city of Cumberland, Maryland while her predecessors were named for the river. After the war she was sold to Standard Oil of New Jersey and sailed under the name Esso Cumberland.

In 1956 with the Suez Crisis Esso Cumberland was acquired by the Navy and assigned to the Military Sealift Command as USNS Cumberland (T-AO-153).

In 1966, Cumberland was converted by Newport News Shipbuilding & Dry Dock Company to a floating electric power supply ship for use in South Vietnam by the United States Army. Stationed at Qui Nhon, South Vietnam her main machinery generated electricity which was transmitted, via power cables, ashore to sub-stations. Later she was moved to Cam Ranh Bay.

Cumberland was sold to Kaohsiung shipbreakers in February 1972.
