= USS Truckee =

Oiler of the United States Navy

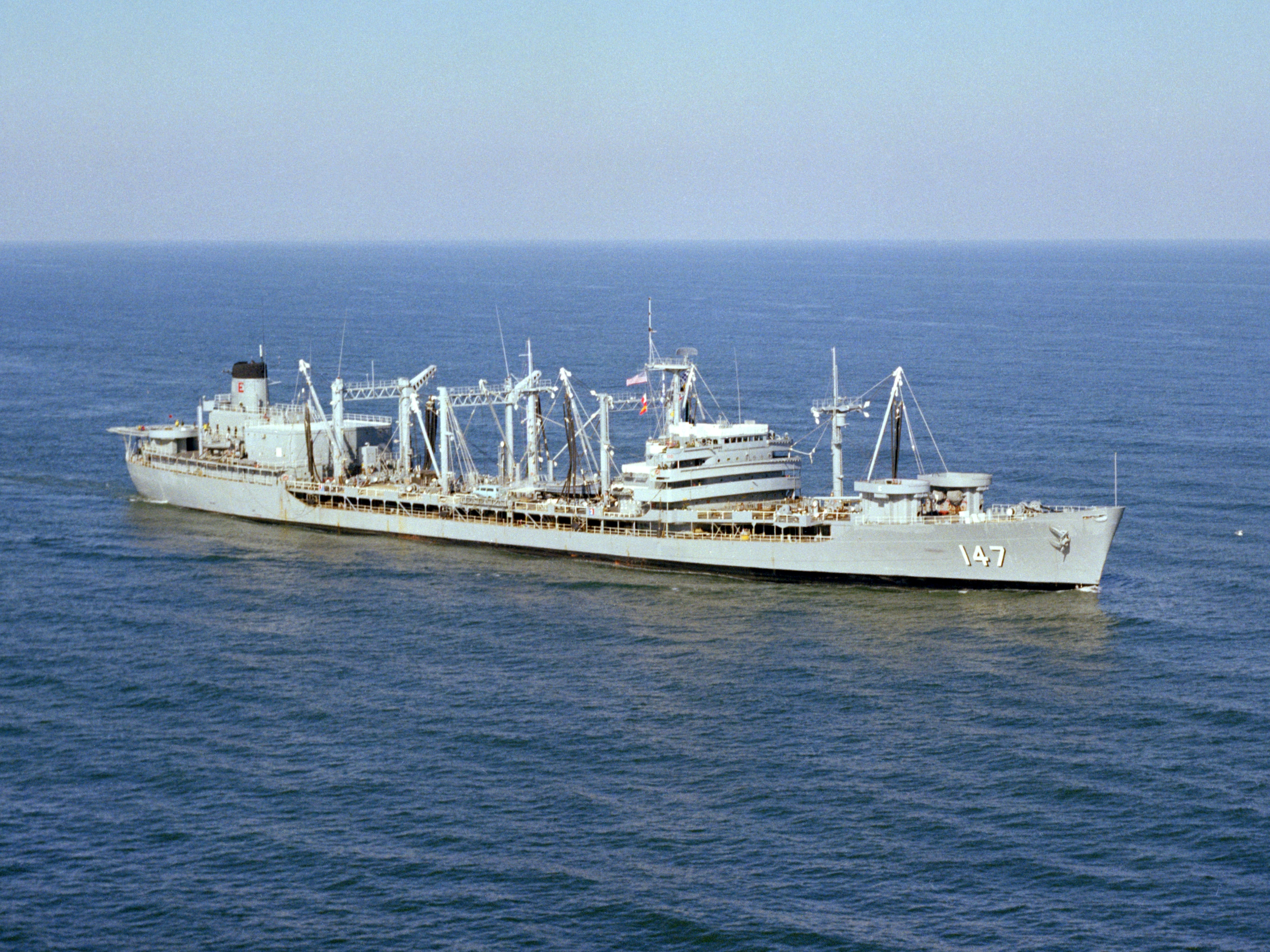
- USNS Truckee (T-AO-147)

History

United States
- Name: USS Truckee
- Namesake: Truckee River in Nevada and California
- Builder: New York Shipbuilding, Camden, New Jersey
- Laid down: 21 December 1953
- Launched: 10 March 1955
- Sponsored by: Mrs. Murrey Levering Royar, Wife of Navy Vice Admiral Royar
- Completed: 1955
- Commissioned: 18 November 1955
- Decommissioned: 30 January 1980
- In service: 30 January 1980
- Out of service: 1994
- Reclassified: T-AO-147, 30 January 1980
- Stricken: 18 July 1997
- Identification: IMO number: 7737080
- Motto: Servimus; (Latin: "We Serve")
- Fate: Scrapped, 6 August 2008

General characteristics
- Class & type: Neosho-class oiler
- Displacement: 11,600 long tons (11,786 t) light; 38,000 long tons (38,610 t) full
- Length: 655 ft (200 m)
- Beam: 86 ft (26 m)
- Draft: 35 ft (11 m)
- Propulsion: 2 geared turbines; 2 boilers; 2 shafts; 28,000 shp (20.9 MW)
- Speed: 20 knots (37 km/h; 23 mph)
- Capacity: 180,000 bbl (29,000 m^{3})
- Complement: USS : 324; USNS : 106 Civilian mariners, 21 Navy
- Armament: 2 × single 5"/38 caliber dual purpose guns; 6 × twin 3"/50 caliber dual purpose guns

USS Truckee (AO-147) was a Neosho-class fleet oiler of the United States Navy in service from 1955 to 1994. The ship was named after the Truckee River in the U.S. states of California and Nevada.

Truckee was laid down in December 1953 at Camden, New Jersey, by the New York Shipbuilding Corporation and launched on 19 March 1955. The fleet oiler was commissioned on 18 November 1955.

== Service history ==
=== 1955–1959 ===
Assigned to the Atlantic Fleet, the served with Service Squadron 4 from January 1956 to 1980. In May 1956, she carried fresh water, her first cargo, to Bermuda and the following month got underway for her first transatlantic voyage. With a group of midshipmen embarked for training, she steamed to Copenhagen, Denmark, and through the North Sea; then stopped at Sheerness, United Kingdom, before turning to the United States. On 19 September, she departed Norfolk, Virginia and acted as flagship and supplied fuel and repairs for a hydrographic survey group operating in the vicinity of two South Atlantic island groups, Ascension Island and Fernando de Noronha in October.

In 1957, she continued her service in the North Atlantic and Caribbean until August when she again headed south to operate with the Atlantic Survey and Cable Group in the mid-South Atlantic. In addition to her regular duties, Truckee served again as flagship on this operation. She returned to Naval Station Norfolk in April 1958 and, in June, sailed for European waters. She stopped at Portuguese, Norwegian, and British ports before returning to the United States in August. Truckee operated out of Norfolk throughout the remainder of 1958 and during the early months of 1959.

In June 1959, she took part in refresher training out of Guantanamo Bay Naval Base. Then, in August, moved north to fuel ships providing support for President Eisenhower's air trip to Europe. Late in the month, she stopped at Greenock, Scotland, and she returned to the Norfolk area in September.

=== 1960–1969 ===
The oiler remained with the 2nd Fleet into 1960, conducting a midshipman cruise in the summer and steaming northward in the fall to take part in NATO exercises inside the Arctic Circle. Truckee then headed to the Mediterranean and served with the 6th Fleet into 1961, making over 160 fuelings at sea between November 1960 and February 1961.`Into the 1960s, Truckee alternated 6th Fleet Mediterranean cruises with 2nd Fleet duty in the Atlantic.

On her Mediterranean deployment which began in February 1962, the oiler served as flagship, Commander, Service Force, 6th Fleet. During the Cuban Missile Crisis in the fall of 1962, Truckee fueled 152 ships in 50 days, while serving as flagship for Commander, Service Squadron 4. In 1963, while continuing her regular round of duties with the 2nd Fleet, she was awarded the Golden "E" since she had won the Battle Efficiency Award for five consecutive years. In 1964, she participated in NATO exercises "Teamwork" and "Masterstroke" in the North Atlantic. Later in 1964, she underwent 10 weeks of yardwork at Baltimore, Maryland, to provide adequate accommodations for the extra staff she would carry when used as a flagship.

On 1 March 1965, Truckee departed Norfolk for an eight-month deployment in the Mediterranean. During this cruise, she served as flagship for Commander, Service Force, 6th Fleet, participated in several major exercises, fueled over 400 ships and visited ports in five countries. On 6 November, she returned to Norfolk and rejoined the 2nd Fleet. In 1966, she received her eighth consecutive combat efficiency "E" award, but her activities were curtailed in mid-summer when she began an extensive overhaul at the Norfolk Naval Shipyard, which was not completed until the new year.

In January 1967, the oiler conducted refresher training out of Guantanamo Bay, Cuba, and, late in March, set her course for the Mediterranean, supporting the 6th Fleet and serving as Service Force flagship. In May, tension mounted in the Mideast as Arab-Israeli relations grew increasingly abrasive. On the morning of 5 June, Truckee was fueling carrier America when the Six-Day War started. After the crisis subsided, Truckee returned to Norfolk in September and participated in NATO exercises during November.

In the first half of 1968, Truckee alternated upkeep and Caribbean cruises. The oiler was damaged by a collision with the anti-submarine aircraft carrier Wasp which occurred on 12 June while she was removing fuel from the carrier. In July and August, Truckee underwent repairs at Norfolk and, in September, got underway for the Mediterranean. During this deployment, she fueled 158 ships, visited seven countries, and pumped 132.5 million litres (35 mio. US gal) of fuel oil before returning to the United States in April 1969 for fleet operations on the Atlantic coast and in the Caribbean. Later in the year, she underwent overhaul and took part in refresher training out of Guantanamo Bay.

=== 1970–1979 ===
She began another Mediterranean deployment in April 1970 and embarked 6th Fleet's Service Force Commander at Naval Station Rota, Spain. Again, as in 1967, Truckee was on the scene when new violence threatened in the Mideast. From 9 September 1970 until 8 October, the tanker supplied the naval forces standing off the coast of Israel during the Jordanian Crisis. Pumping day and night during 27 of her 30 days at sea, she earned the Meritorious Unit Commendation for her performance. On 18 November, Truckee returned to Norfolk and began the conversion of her plant to burn Navy Distillate Fuel. The oiler plied the Atlantic from Nova Scotia to the Virgin Islands in 1971, supporting NATO and Atlantic Fleet operations. She participated in Exercise "Rough Ride" in June. After that 10-day NATO exercise involving ships from five countries, she supported a NATO sea power demonstration off Norfolk in September.

February 1972 found Truckee again underway, via the Caribbean, for the Mediterranean. At the end of this deployment with the 6th Fleet, she returned to the east coast in November and, at year's end, had pumped a total of 189 million litres (50 mio. US gal) of fuel. On deployment with the 6th Fleet again in 1973, Truckee provided support during yet another Middle East crisis, the Yom Kippur War. After an emergency sortie from Palma de Mallorca on 7 October occasioned by the heaviest Arab-Israeli fighting since 1967, Truckee remained in the eastern Mediterranean until ordered to standdown from alert posture on 18 November 1973. During this cruise, the tanker pumped 95 million litres (25 mio. US gal) of fuel to NATO and United States ships and steamed 40,000 km (25,000 mi). In 1974, Truckee remained on the east coast operating out of Norfolk. She also underwent an extended overhaul which took seven and one-half months and was not completed until January 1975. In the summer of 1975, she participated in Exercises "National Week" and "Dawn Patrol" in the eastern Mediterranean. Later in August, she shifted operations to the western Mediterranean before departing Rota, Spain, in October at the end of her 10th Mediterranean deployment. On 3 November, she returned to Norfolk for overhaul.

In February 1976, she returned to duty with the 2nd Fleet operating out of Norfolk with occasional visits to other east coast ports. Second Fleet operations took Truckee to Guantanamo in May and to Puerto Rico in July, and she continued local operations out of Norfolk for the remainder of the year. The early months of 1977 were spent in preparations for Truckee's forthcoming deployment to the Mediterranean. She departed Norfolk for operations with the 6th Fleet on 31 March. Following six months of providing fuel to units of that fleet, Truckee arrived at Norfolk on 21 October. A two-week, post-deployment standdown was followed by an availability devoted primarily to overhaul of the ship's entire Mk 56 gun fire control system. The close of the year found the fleet oiler in her home port. During the period 6 January to 11 July 1978, Truckee conducted operations in the Caribbean on four separate occasions. An upkeep followed; and then, on 25 August, Truckee departed Norfolk for a two and one-half month deployment to the North Atlantic. Port visits during the deployment included Rotterdam, Netherlands, Kiel, Germany, and Lisbon, Portugal. The ship returned to Norfolk on 30 October, and she continued local operations out of that port into 1979.

=== 1980–1994 ===
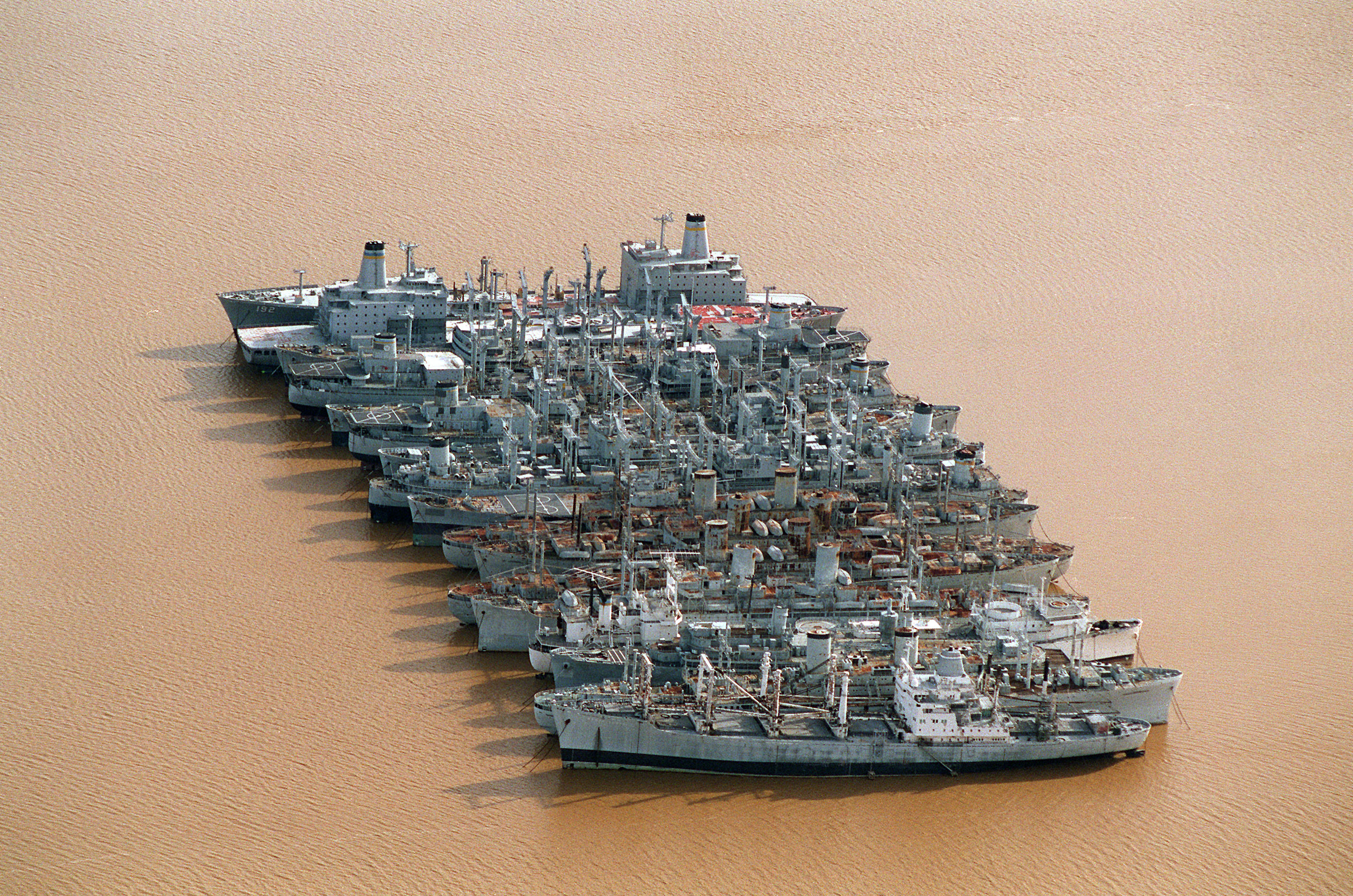
Truckee (fourth ship from the top) laid up in 1996.

Truckee ended her operations as a fleet oiler with the United States Navy on 8 November 1979. She finished the last of her 25 odd years while assigned to Service Squadron 4, NAVSURFLANT in Norfolk, Virginia. She departed Norfolk on 21 January 1980 for Headquarters, Military Sealift Command (MSC) in Bayonne, New Jersey, for decommissioning ceremonies. On 30 January 1980 Captain Diego E. Hernández read his orders and then turned the ship over to Captain Richard O. Gooden, Commanding Officer Military Sealift Command. The oiler was then turned over to MSC as USNS Truckee (T-AO-147). After decommissioning, the Truckee underwent conversion, during which (most notably) all her armament was removed. As a member of the MSC, Truckee's role was not much different. However, the crew changed drastically. Instead of a naval crew, a much smaller crew of civilians provided essentially the same service to the fleet. She was placed out of service in 1994, and struck from the Naval Vessel Register on 18 July 1997.

=== Disposal ===
Truckee was transferred to the United States Maritime Administration (MARAD) on 1 May 1999 for lay up in the National Defense Reserve Fleet, James River, Fort Eustis, Virginia. On 6 August 2008, Truckee was removed from the NDRF after being sold to Bay Bridge Enterprises for scrapping.
