= USS Mississinewa (AO-144) =

Oiler of the United States Navy

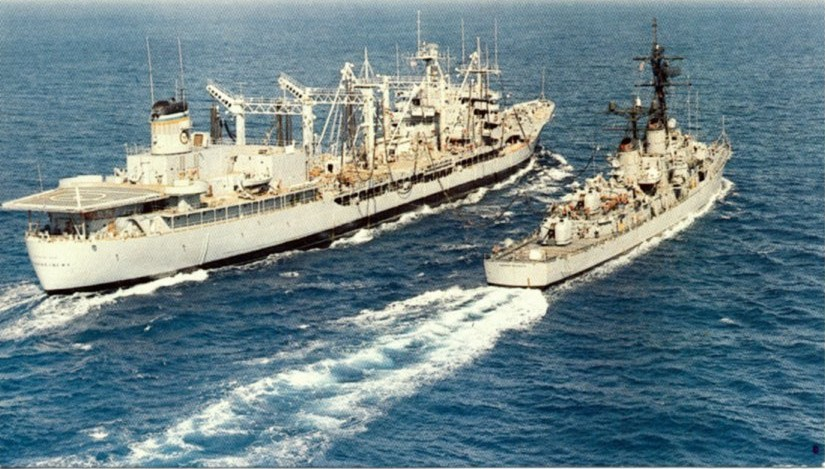
- USNS Mississinewa (T-AO-144) refueling the destroyer Forrest Sherman (DD-931)

History

United States
- Name: USS Mississinewa
- Namesake: Mississinewa River
- Awarded: 28 January 1952
- Builder: New York Shipbuilding, Camden, New Jersey
- Laid down: 4 May 1953
- Launched: 2 June 1954
- Sponsored by: Mrs. Wright
- Commissioned: 18 January 1955
- Decommissioned: 15 November 1976
- In service: 15 November 1976
- Out of service: 1991
- Reclassified: T-AO-144, 15 November 1976
- Stricken: 16 February 1994
- Identification: IMO number: 7737054
- Motto: "Fuelum no Foolum"
- Fate: Scrapped, 2008

General characteristics
- Class & type: Neosho-class oiler
- Displacement: 11,600 long tons (11,786 t) light; 38,000 long tons (38,610 t) full
- Length: 655 ft (200 m)
- Beam: 86 ft (26 m)
- Draft: 35 ft (11 m)
- Propulsion: 2 geared turbines; 2 boilers; 2 shafts; 28,000 shp (20.9 MW)
- Speed: 20 knots (37 km/h; 23 mph)
- Capacity: 180,000 bbl (29,000 m^{3})
- Complement: USS : 324; USNS : 106 Civilian mariners, 21 Navy
- Armament: 2 × single 5"/38 caliber dual purpose guns; 6 × twin 3"/50 caliber dual purpose guns
- Aviation facilities: Helipad

USS Mississinewa (AO-144) was a Neosho-class fleet oiler of the United States Navy in service from 1955 to the early 1990s.

The second Mississinewa was laid down by New York Shipbuilding Corporation, Camden, New Jersey, in May 1953 and was launched on 12 June 1954, sponsored by Mrs. Wright. She was commissioned on 18 January 1955, Captain M. J. Jensen in command.

== Service history ==
=== United States Navy, 1955–1976 ===
Mississinewa, second of a class designed to provide fuel, food, stores, and mail services rapidly and for sustained periods to ships at sea, operated primarily along the U.S. East Coast, with one brief Mediterranean deployment, until 1 May 1956. She then departed her original home port, Newport, Rhode Island, for Naples, Italy. With Naples as her home port, the tanker cruised the Mediterranean servicing the 6th Fleet in normal and crisis operations until 1964. During the fall of 1956 and early winter 1957, she supported 6th Fleet ships as they stood by in case they were called on to intervene in the Suez Crisis and the tense period that followed. Again, in mid‑July 1958, she got underway on short notice to provide logistic support to ships of the 6th Fleet during an emergency in the Middle East, this time in Lebanon. Remaining off the Lebanese coast until September, she refueled over 200 ships as the U.S. 6th Fleet landed the U.S. Marine Corps and then stood by at the request of President Chamoun of Lebanon, in "Operation Blue Bat". From 1962 to 1964, Mississinewa's responsibilities were increased as she served as flagship of Commander Service Force, 6th Fleet.

Prior to the reassignment of Newport as her home port in September 1964, Mississinewa had returned to the United States only for regularly scheduled yard periods. During those intervals she received new equipment during overhaul, which included in 1957 the installation of a helipad and the assignment of a helicopter for use in vertical replenishment. Since 1964, into 1969, she operated in the western Atlantic, from Newfoundland to the Caribbean, with regular deployments to the Mediterranean and one, in August 1966, to northern Norway for NATO exercises.

=== Military Sealift Command, 1976–1991 ===
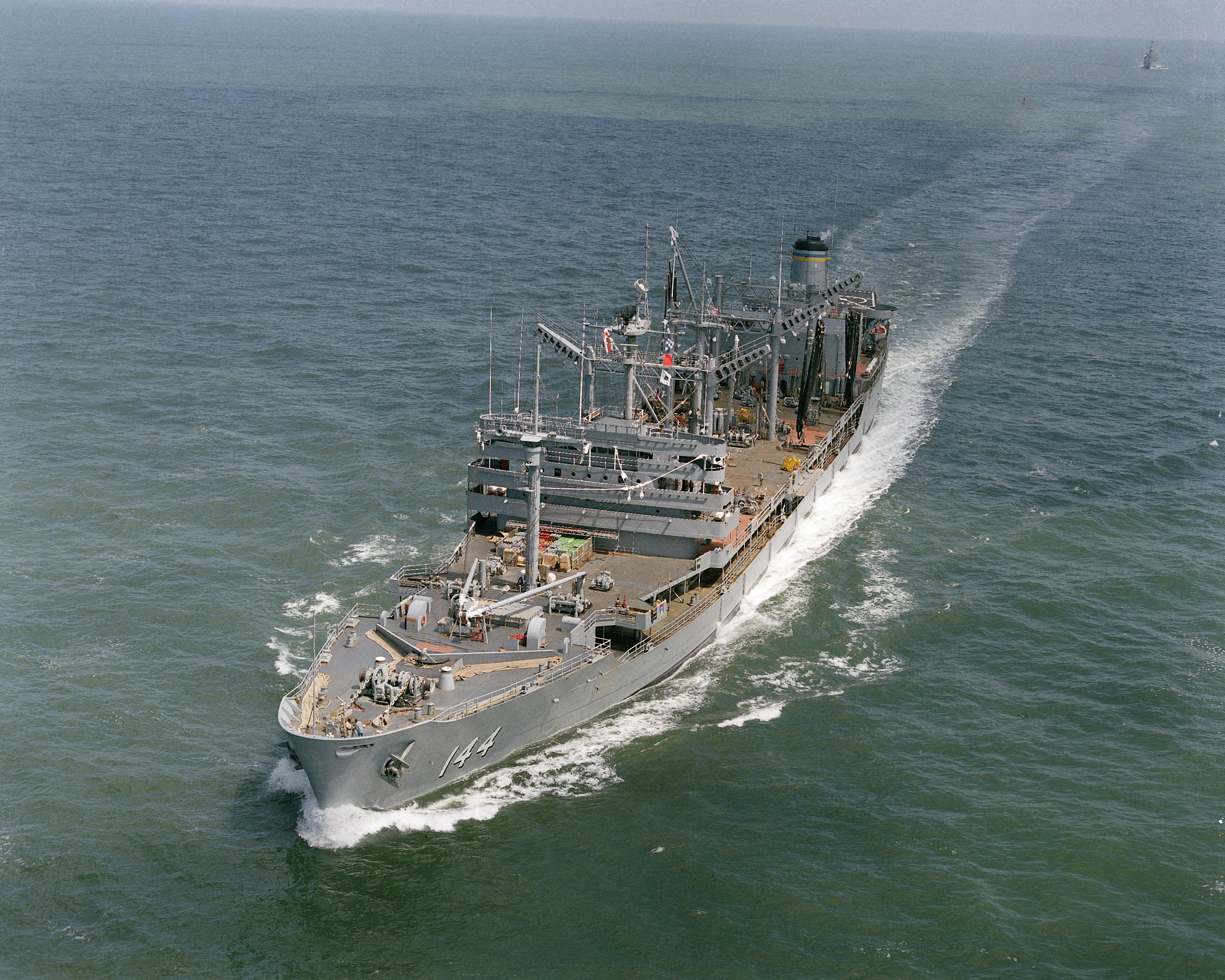
USNS Mississinewa in 1986.

Mississinewa was decommissioned on 15 November 1976 by the U.S. Navy, and placed in service with the Military Sealift Command as USNS Mississinewa (T-AO-144), continuing her service with a civilian crew. She was placed out of service in 1991 and struck from the Naval Vessel Register on 16 February 1994.

== Disposal ==
Mississinewa was transferred to the United States Maritime Administration (MARAD) on 1 May 1999 for lay up in the National Defense Reserve Fleet, James River, Fort Eustis, Virginia. Mississinewa departed the National Defense Reserve Fleet, James River Group, under a disposal contract on 30 January 2007 to be scrapped at International Shipbreaking Ltd. (ESCO), Brownsville, Texas. Arrived ESCO Brownsville, TX., 17 February 2007, scrapping completed, 11 February 2008
