= Neosho-class oiler =

Class of American oilers

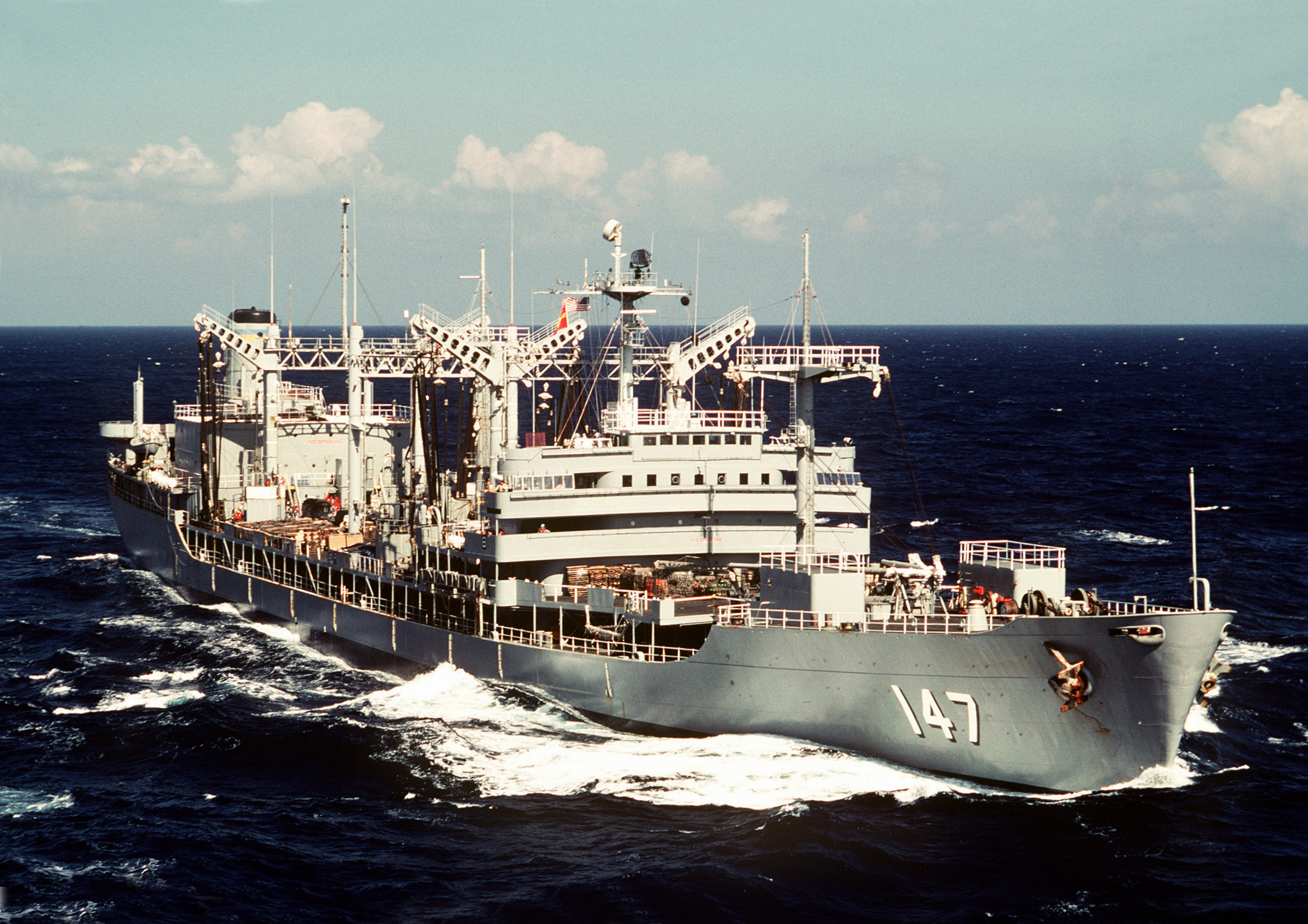
- USNS Truckee on 17 August 1990

Class overview
- Name: Neosho
- Builders: Bethlehem Fore River; New York Shipbuilding Corporation
- Operators: United States Navy
- Preceded by: Suamico class
- Succeeded by: Cimarron class
- Built: 1952–1955
- In commission: 1954–1992
- Completed: 6
- Retired: 6

General characteristics
- Type: Oil tanker
- Displacement: 11,600 long tons (11,786 t) light; 38,000 long tons (38,610 t) full
- Length: 655 ft (200 m)
- Beam: 86 ft (26 m)
- Draft: 35 ft (11 m)
- Propulsion: 2 geared turbines; 2 boilers; 2 shafts; 28,000 shp (20.9 MW)
- Speed: 20 knots (37 km/h; 23 mph)
- Capacity: 180,000 bbl (29,000 m^{3})
- Complement: USS : 324; USNS : 106 Civilian mariners, 21 Navy
- Armament: 2 × single 5"/38 caliber dual purpose guns; 6 × twin 3"/50 caliber dual purpose guns
- Aviation facilities: Hangar and helipad

The Neosho-class oiler was a class of oilers of the United States Navy. They were in commission between 1954 and 1992.

== Development ==
Neosho-class oilers were built in the 1950s by two shipyards, Bethlehem's Fore River Shipyard and New York Shipbuilding Corporation. The lead ship, Neosho, entered service in 1954. Her sister ships were commissioned in the following years.

In the mid-1970s, the Military Sealift Command took over the vessels, and they were redesignated from USS to USNS. The Neosho and Mispillion-class oilers were replaced by the Henry J. Kaiser class, with its lead ship, USS Henry J. Kaiser, entering service in 1986.

== Ships in the class ==
Neosho class
Hull no.	Name	Builder	Laid down	Launched	Commissioned	Decommissioned
AO-143 / T-AO-143	Neosho	Bethlehem Shipbuilding Corporation	2 September 1952	10 November 1953	24 September 1954	25 May 1978
AO-144 / T-AO-144	Mississinewa	New York Shipbuilding Corporation	4 May 1953	2 June 1954	18 January 1955	15 November 1976
AO-145 / T-AO-145	Hassayampa	New York Shipbuilding Corporation	13 July 1953	12 September 1954	15 April 1955	2 October 1991
AO-146 / T-AO-146	Kawishiwi	New York Shipbuilding Corporation	5 October 1953	11 December 1954	6 July 1955	September 1992
AO-147 / T-AO-147	Truckee	New York Shipbuilding Corporation	21 December 1953	10 March 1955	18 November 1955	30 January 1980
AO-148 / T-AO-148	Ponchatoula	New York Shipbuilding Corporation	1 March 1954	9 July 1955	12 January 1956	5 September 1980

== See also ==
- List of United States Navy ships
