= Marvin John Jensen =

Marvin John "Jens" Jensen (July 8, 1908 – April 6, 1993) was a Rear Admiral in the United States Navy.

A native of Sheboygan, Wisconsin, Jensen was born on July 8, 1908. He graduated from the United States Naval Academy in 1931. He married Jean Dorothy (Richardson) Jensen on December 23, 1934, in Yuma, Arizona. During World War II he became the first officer to command the submarine USS Puffer (SS-268). While in command he was awarded the Silver Star for his actions during the vessel's war patrol in the Makassar Strait-Celebes Sea area in September and October 1943. Jensen was promoted to captain effective December 1, 1950. In 1955, he served as the first commanding officer of the fleet oiler USS Mississinewa (AO-144). Jensen retired from active duty in 1959 and was advanced to rear admiral on the retired list based on his combat service record.
