= USS Puffer (SS-268) =

Submarine of the United States

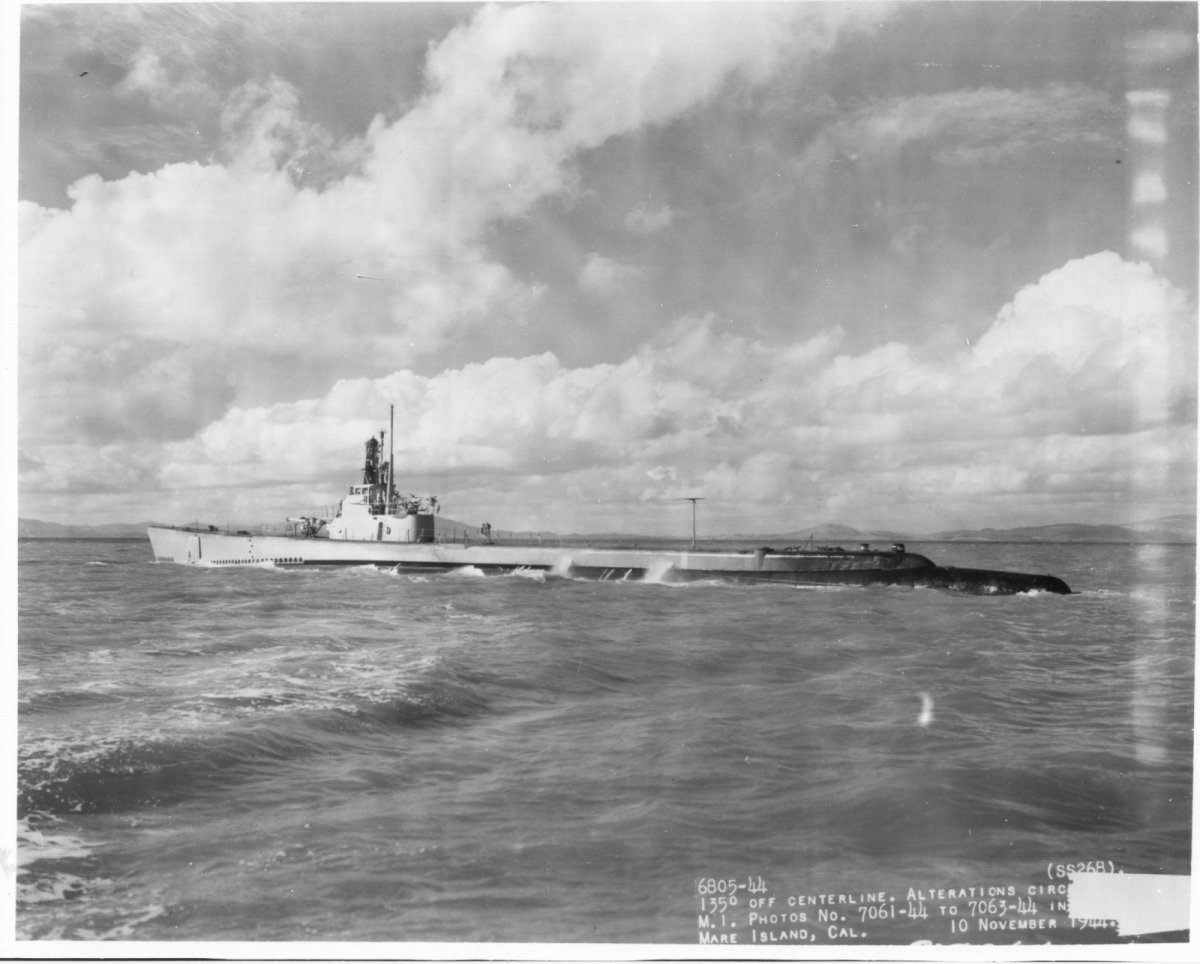
- USS Puffer (SS-268) underway off Mare Island, California, on 10 November 1944.

History

United States
- Builder: Manitowoc Shipbuilding Company, Manitowoc, Wisconsin
- Laid down: 16 February 1942
- Launched: 21 November 1942
- Sponsored by: Mrs. Ruth B. Lyons
- Commissioned: 27 April 1943
- Decommissioned: 28 June 1946
- Stricken: 1 July 1960
- Fate: Sold for scrap 3 December 1960

General characteristics
- Class & type: Gato-class diesel-electric submarine
- Displacement: 1,525 tons (1,549 t) surfaced; 2,424 tons (2,460 t) submerged
- Length: 311 ft 9 in (95.02 m)
- Beam: 27 ft 3 in (8.31 m)
- Draft: 17 ft 0 in (5.18 m) maximum
- Propulsion: 4 × General Motors Model 16-248 V16 Diesel engines driving electric generators; 2 × 126-cell Sargo batteries; 4 × high-speed General Electric electric motors with reduction gears; two propellers; 5,400 shp (4.0 MW) surfaced; 2,740 shp (2.0 MW) submerged
- Speed: 21 knots (39 km/h) surfaced; 9 knots (17 km/h) submerged
- Range: 11,000 NM (20,000 km) surfaced at 10 knots (19 km/h)
- Endurance: 48 hours at 2 knots (4 km/h) submerged; 75 days on patrol
- Test depth: 300 ft (90 m)
- Complement: 6 officers, 54 enlisted
- Armament: 10 × 21-inch (533 mm) torpedo tubes; 6 forward, 4 aft; 24 torpedoes; 1 × 3-inch (76 mm) / 50 caliber deck gun; Bofors 40 mm and Oerlikon 20 mm cannon

USS Puffer (SS-268), a Gato-class submarine, was the first ship of the United States Navy to be named for the puffer.

== Construction and commissioning ==
Puffer was laid down by the Manitowoc Shipbuilding Company at Manitowoc, Wisconsin, on 16 February 1942; launched on 21 November 1942, sponsored by Mrs. Ruth B. Lyons, granddaughter of the oldest employee at Manitowoc Shipbuilding, Christian Jacobson, Sr.; and commissioned on 27 April 1943, Lieutenant Commander Marvin John Jensen in command.

== Service history ==
Puffer was transported down the Mississippi to New Orleans on a special floating drydock, having periscope shears re-installed en route. After receiving torpedoes and ammunition, she exercised off Panama for a month, and then headed across the Pacific to Australia. Puffer arrived there in early September 1943.

=== First and second war patrols, September 1943 – January 1944 ===
Puffer′s first war patrol, to intercept Japanese commerce in the Makassar Strait–Celebes Sea area, 7 September to 17 October, resulted in several damaged ships but no sinkings. On 9 October, after damaging a merchantman (Kumagawa Maru), she endured a nearly 38-hour depth charging from 2 Japanese sub chasers and was slightly damaged. On 24 November Puffer departed on her second patrol, in the Sulu Sea and the approaches to Manila. On 13 December, she made a successful attack on freighter Teiko Maru (ex-Vichy French steamship D'Artagnan). On 20 December she sank the old 820-ton escorting destroyer IJN Fuyō, and on 1 January 1944, 6,707-ton freighter Ryuyo Maru, before putting into Fremantle for refit on 12 January.

=== Third and fourth war patrols, February – June 1944 ===
Puffer departed for her third war patrol, in the South China Sea, 4 February. On 22 February, she sank the 15,105-ton transport Teikyo Maru. Returning to Fremantle 4 April, she departed again on her fourth war patrol on 30 April for Madoera Straits, Makassar Straits and the Sulu Sea. She acted as life guard for the first Allied carrier strike on Soerabaia, sank 3,181-ton freighter Shinryu Maru 18 May, then on 5 June, attacked three tankers, sinking 2,166-ton Ashizuri and 2,500-ton Takasaki. She ended this most successful patrol, for which she received the Navy Unit Commendation, at Fremantle 21 June.

=== Fifth war patrol, July 1944 – ~ 1944 ===
On 14 July Puffer departed for her fifth war patrol, in Makassar Straits, the Celebes, Sulu, and South China Seas. She made contact with a submarine tender screened by five escorts on 21 July, spending three days following the group and using all but nine torpedoes to sink the tender.

Twenty-three days later, on 12 August, she made contact with ten large vessels and their escorts. Five of the remaining nine torpedoes sank the 5,113-ton tanker Teikon Maru and a large freighter, with enough damage to beach another tanker. She completed the patrol at Pearl Harbor, whence she continued on to Mare Island for overhaul.

=== Sixth and seventh war patrols, December 1944 – ~ 1945 ===
Following refresher training at Hawaii, Puffer got underway on her sixth war patrol 16 December. Operating in the Nansei Shoto area, she sank Coast Defense Vessel No. 42 on 10 January 1945; and, prior to her arrival at Guam, 17 January, damaged a destroyer, three freighters, and a tanker.

By 11 February, Puffer was underway again for her seventh war patrol, and following patrols in Luzon Straits and the South China Sea, where she bombarded Pratas Island, she made an anti-shipping sweep of the Wake Island area.

=== Eighth and ninth war patrols, May 1945 – ~ 1945 ===
Refitted at Midway she departed 20 May en route to the South China and Java Seas to conduct her eighth war patrol. In a surface sweep of the northern Bali coast, Puffer destroyed by gunfire two Japanese sea trucks and six landing craft on 5 July, and inflicted extensive damage to harbor installations at Chelukan Bawang and Buleleng, Bali. A brief respite at Fremantle followed, whence she headed north for her ninth and last war patrol, in the Java Sea.

=== Post-World War II service ===
Completing her ninth patrol with the cessation of hostilities in mid-August 1945, Puffer headed for Subic Bay, thence to the United States, reaching San Francisco 15 October. With the new year, 1946, Puffer returned to Hawaii where she trained officers and men in submarine warfare until returning to San Francisco, 19 March, for inactivation.

== Decommissioning and disposal ==
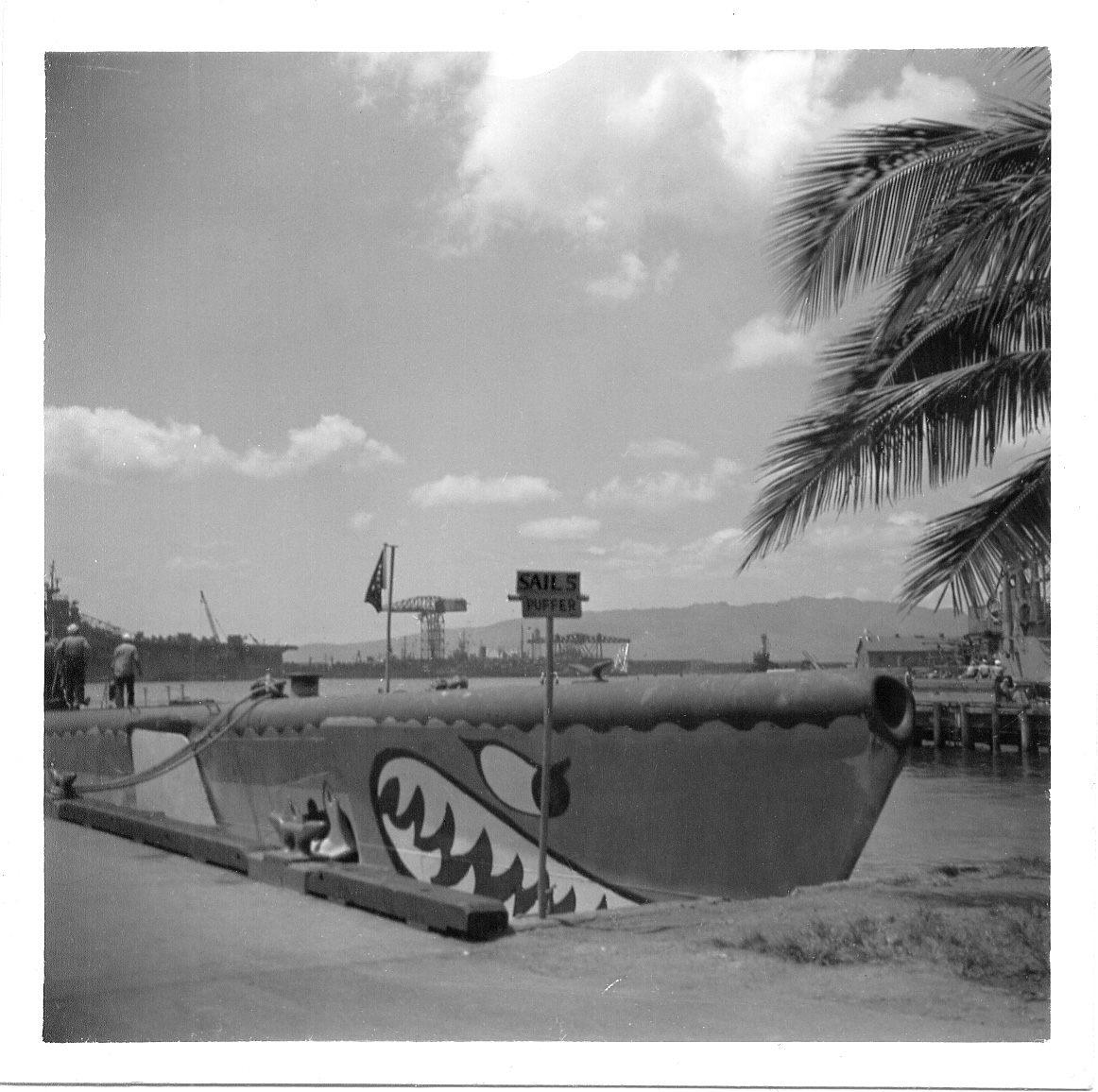
Shark's mouth painting on Puffer′s bow

Puffer decommissioned 28 June 1946, and was berthed at Mare Island as a unit of the Pacific Reserve Fleet. At the end of the year Puffer was ordered activated and assigned to the 13th Naval District for training Naval Reservists. Employed in that status, at Seattle, until relieved by USS Bowfin (SS-287) 10 June 1960, Puffer was placed out of service and sold for scrapping to the Zidell Corporation, Portland, Oregon, on 4 November 1960.

== Honors and awards ==
Puffer earned 9 battle stars for World War II service in the Pacific Theater, with a total tonnage of 36,392 tons (eight ships).

- Asiatic-Pacific Campaign Medal with nine battle stars
- World War II Victory Medal
- Philippine Liberation Medal
- Navy Unit Commendation
