= USNS Ponchatoula =

Oiler of the United States Navy

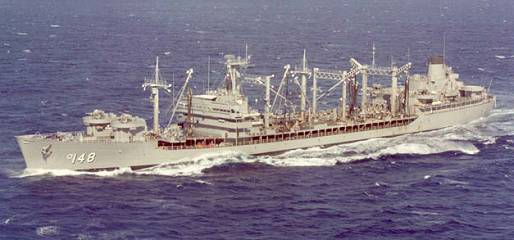
- USNS Ponchatoula (T-AO-148) at sea

History

United States
- Name: USS Ponchatoula
- Namesake: Ponchatoula Creek
- Ordered: 28 January 1952
- Builder: New York Shipbuilding, Camden, New Jersey
- Laid down: 1 March 1954
- Launched: 9 July 1955
- Commissioned: 12 January 1956
- Decommissioned: 5 September 1980
- In service: 1980
- Out of service: 1 April 1992
- Stricken: 31 August 1992
- Identification: IMO number: 7737092
- Honors and awards: 12 campaign stars (Vietnam)
- Fate: Scrapped

General characteristics
- Class & type: Neosho-class oiler
- Displacement: 11,600 long tons (11,786 t) light; 38,000 long tons (38,610 t) full
- Length: 655 ft (200 m)
- Beam: 86 ft (26 m)
- Draft: 35 ft (11 m)
- Propulsion: 2 geared turbines; 2 boilers; 2 shafts; 28,000 shp (20.9 MW)
- Speed: 20 knots (37 km/h; 23 mph)
- Capacity: 180,000 bbl (29,000 m^{3})
- Complement: USS : 324; USNS : 106 Civilian mariners, 21 Navy
- Armament: 2 × single 5"/38 caliber dual purpose guns; 6 × twin 3"/50 caliber dual purpose guns

USS Ponchatoula (AO-148) was one of six Neosho-class fleet oilers built for the United States Navy, in service from 1956 to 1992, and named for the Ponchatoula Creek which rises in Tangipahoa Parish, Louisiana, and flows into the Natalbany River, west of Ponchatoula, Louisiana. She was the second U.S. Naval vessel to bear the name.

Ponchatoula was laid down at the New York Shipbuilding Corporation, Camden, New Jersey, on 1 March 1954, launched on 9 July 1955, sponsored by Mrs. I. N. Kiland, and commissioned on 12 January 1956.

== Service history ==
After fitting out at Philadelphia, Ponchatoula, the sixth of a class designed to combine speed and large cargo capacity for rapid underway replenishment over extended operational periods, got underway for the Pacific. Arriving at Long Beach, California, on 10 March, she underwent shakedown and training exercises off the California coast and in September deployed to the Far East. En route she assisted SS Venus, a Panamanian merchantman lying helpless on the fringes of two typhoons. Taking Venus in tow on the 26th, Ponchatoula was relieved of her tow on the 28th, and continued on to Sasebo to join the 7th Fleet.

Rotated regularly to the western Pacific, Ponchatoula was homeported at Pearl Harbor in early 1958 and received her introduction to support under hostile conditions while operating with 7th Fleet units during the Quemoy-Matsu Crisis in the fall of that year.

Support for experimental operations highlighted 1962 as she provided POL (petroleum, oil, lubricants) services to Joint Task Force 8 engaged in "Operation Dominic I" (the Christmas Island nuclear test series), then operated with Project Mercury recovery ships during the Sigma 7 splashdown. Repeating that support with Faith 7 in 1963, she shifted to combat operations in October 1964 and deployed to the South China Sea to refuel ships employ the coast of Vietnam. After 279 refuelings, she returned to Hawaiian waters. In June 1965 she participated in recovery operations for Gemini 4, then deployed again to Vietnam. In December she interrupted operations there to support the recovery ships for Gemini 6 and Gemini 7 and in April 1966 returned to Hawaii after having set a new record in the Pacific Fleet by bringing 503 ships alongside, 464 of which she refueled. Deployed to WestPac again in November 1967, she pumped over 74 million US gallons (280,000 m^{3}) of fuel through her hoses before returning home in June 1968. In October she again joined ships in the Pacific splashdown area, this time to recover Apollo 7, the first U.S. three-man flight.

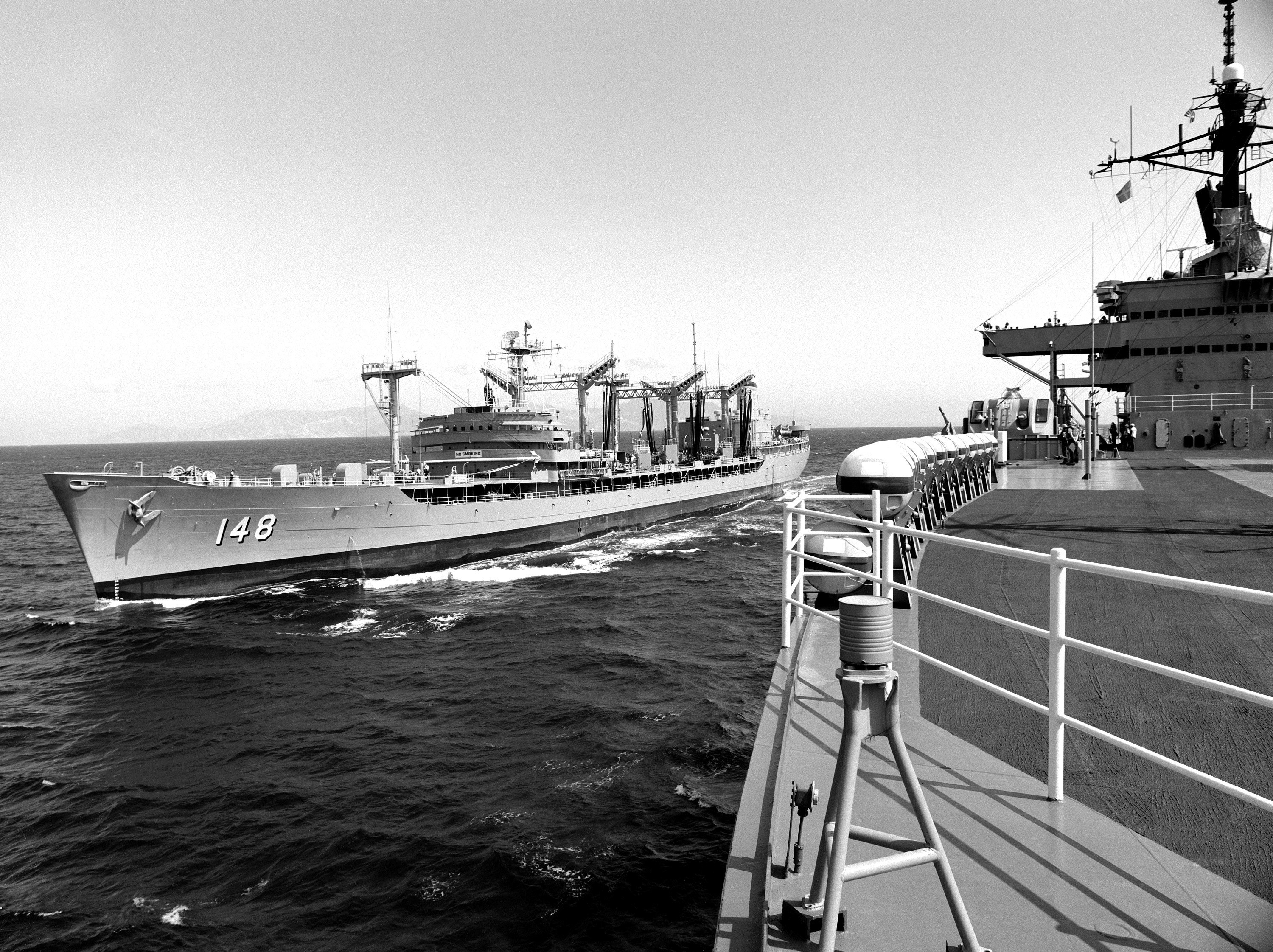
USNS Ponchatoula in 1991.

By 8 December, Ponchatoula was back in the Philippines, whence she got underway for "Yankee Station" in the Gulf of Tonkin on the 15th again to replenish ships operating in support of Allied operations in Vietnam. Ponchatoula earned twelve battle stars for Vietnam War service. In July 1969, she returned home and into 1970 remained in Hawaiian waters.

In 1972 she refueled USS Berkeley (DDG 15) home bound from the Vietnam War.

Decommissioned on 5 September 1980 (Captain Jack C. Presley), Ponchatoula was placed in service with the Military Sealift Command (MSC) as USNS Ponchatoula (T-AO-148) where she served with the Seventh Fleet in the Persian Gulf during Operation Fiery Vigil, Operation Desert Shield and Operation Desert Storm. She was badly damaged in a collision with the guided missile cruiser USS Chancellorsville (CG62) in August 1991. The Chancellorsville suffered a steering casualty during underway replenishment operations and heeled sharply to port, ramming the Ponchatoula's starboard side at the Bridge, then sliding down the starboard side of the ship, buckling the upper deck plates of the Ponchatoula to the engine house and damaging the Chancellorsville's hurricane bow and sonar dome. Ponchatoula was struck from the Naval Vessel Register on 31 August 1992; her title was transferred to MARAD on 1 May 1999 for lay-up in the National Defense Reserve Fleet, Suisun Bay, Benicia, California. MARAD listed Ponchatoula still at Suisun Bay in February 2007. She was towed from Suisun Bay on June 5, 2014 to be dismantled in Brownsville, Texas. Her final voyage is chronicled at http://navy.memorieshop.com/Ponchatoula/Last-Voyage.html.

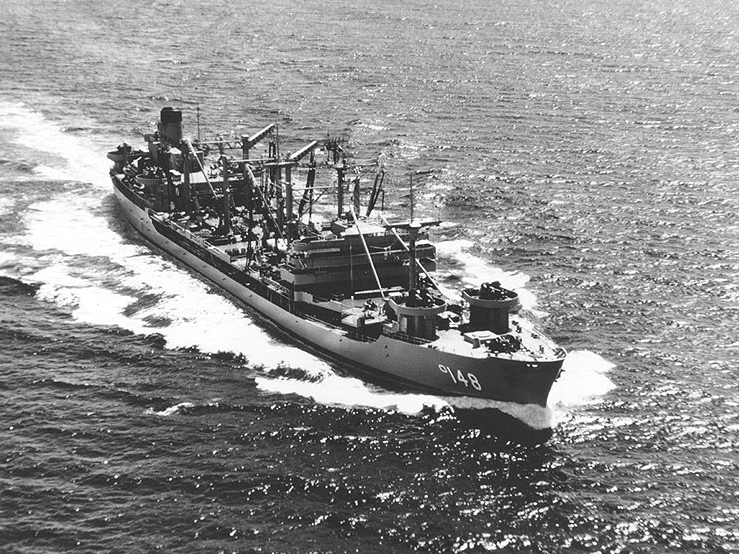

== Memorial ==
A 1/7th scale model of the stern of the ship is located at the Collinswood Museum in downtown Ponchatoula, LA. The model includes artifacts recovered from the ship during its dismantling.
