= Diego E. Hernández =

Recipient of the Purple Heart medal

Diego E. Hernandez
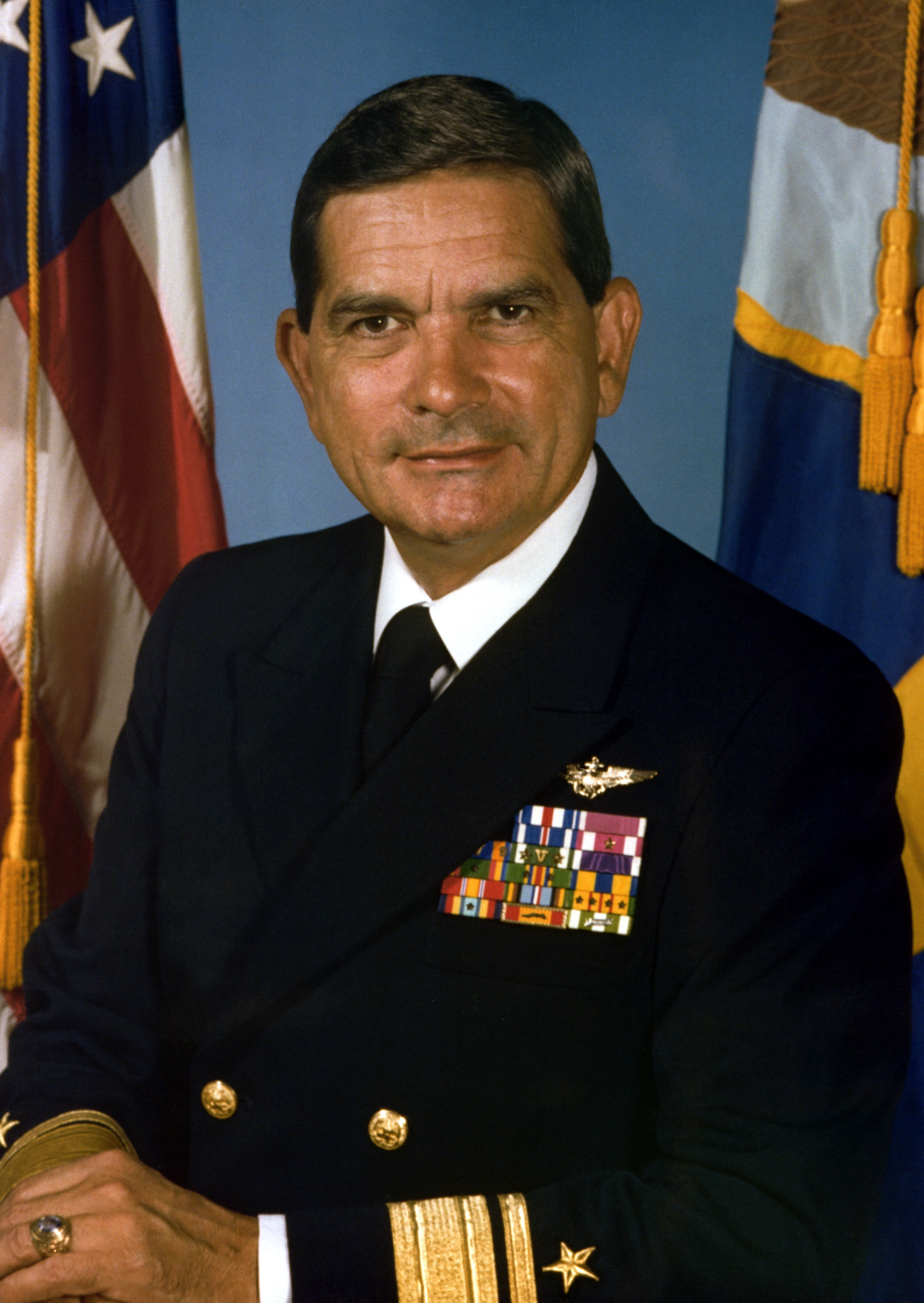
- Vice Admiral Diego E. Hernandez; First Hispanic to be named Vice Commander, North American Aerospace Defense Command(NORAD)
- Born: Diego Hernandez Sanfeliz; March 25, 1934; San Juan, Puerto Rico
- Died: July 7, 2017 (aged 83); Miami Lakes, Florida, U.S.
- Burial place: Arlington National Cemetery
- Military career
- Allegiance: United States of America
- Branch: United States Navy
- Service years: 1955-1991
- Rank: Vice Admiral
- Nickname: Duke
- Commands: USS John F. Kennedy; USS Truckee; Deputy Commander in Chief U.S. Space Command; Vice Commander, North American Aerospace Defense Command
- Conflicts: Vietnam War
- Awards: Navy Distinguished Service Medal; Silver Star; Legion of Merit; Purple Heart; Meritorious Service Medal; Air Medal

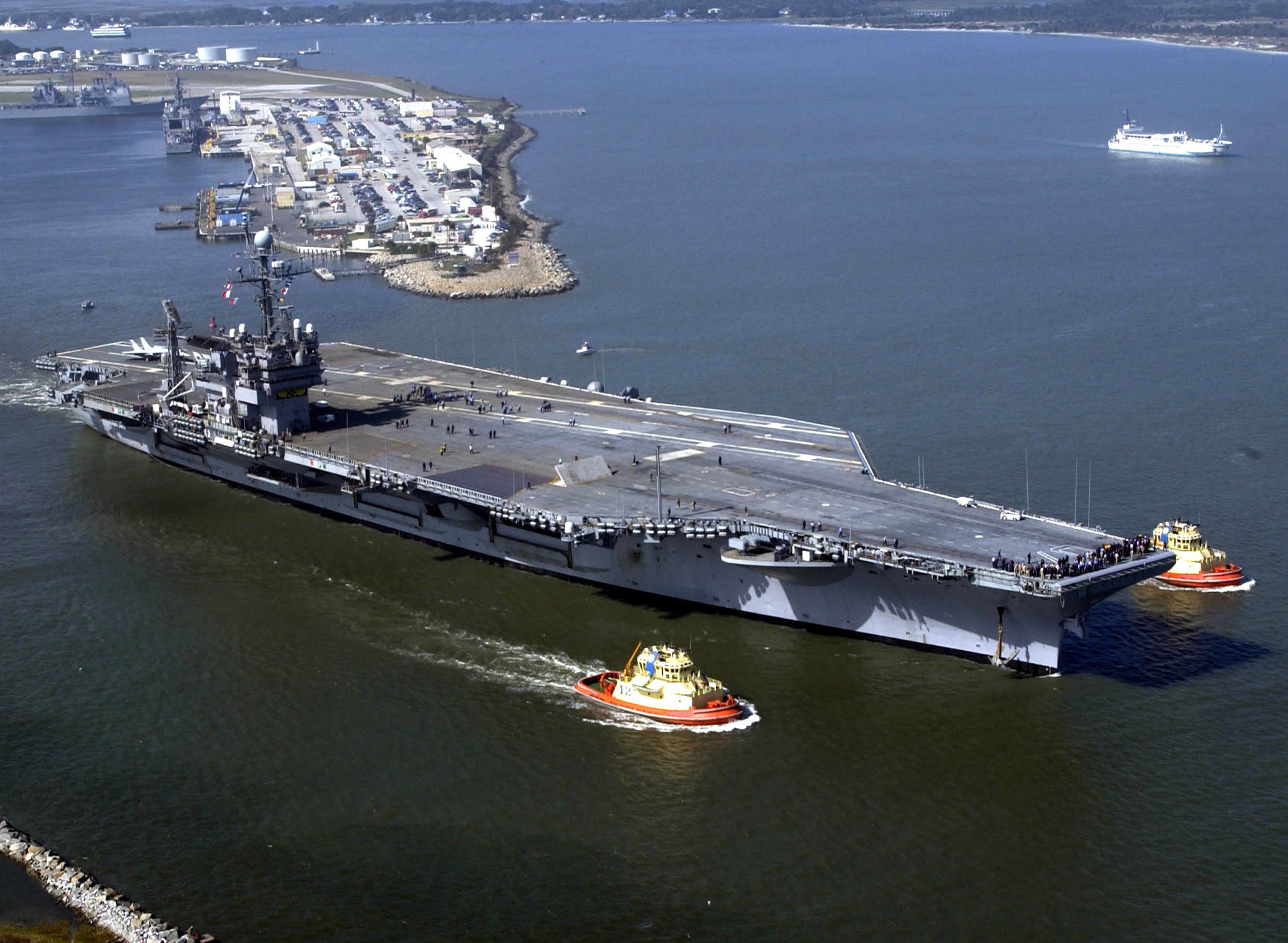
USS John F. Kennedy

Vice Admiral Diego E. Hernandez (March 25, 1934 – July 7, 2017) was a United States Navy officer who was the first Hispanic American to be named Vice Commander, North American Aerospace Defense Command (NORAD).

== Early years ==
Hernandez (birth name: Diego Hernandez Sanfeliz) was born on March 25, 1934 and raised in San Juan, Puerto Rico, the Capital of Puerto Rico, where he received his primary education. Upon his high school graduation, he was able to attend Illinois Institute of Technology with a Navy ROTC scholarship. In 1955, he earned a degree in Physics and was commissioned an ensign in the United States Navy upon his graduation. He then underwent flight training and in August 1956, was designated a Naval Aviator.

== Military career ==
Hernandez served in carrier-based fighter squadrons at sea in a variety of assignments. He flew two combat tours in Vietnam during the Vietnam War. He also served as Aide and Flag Lieutenant to Commander, Carrier Division 14. At sea, he was the commander of Fighter Squadron 84, Carrier Air Wing Six, and a fleet oiler (the USS Truckee (AO-147)).

On June 27, 1980, Captain Diego E. Hernandez relieved outgoing Captain Myers and took command of the aircraft carrier USS John F. Kennedy. It was capable of anti-submarine warfare (ASW), making it an all-purpose carrier.

On September 19, 1980, Libyan Air Force planes engaged in an unprecedented number of sorties in the vicinity of USS John F. Kennedy's Battle Group over international waters. F-14's under E-2 control intercepted two Libyan sections, and six and eighteen sections, respectively, on September 20 and 21.

On August 29, 1981, after a change of command ceremony, Captain D. Bruce Cargill relieved Captain Hernandez as commander of the USS John F. Kennedy. In 1988, Vice Admiral Diego E. Hernandez as Commander, Third Fleet, coordinated RIMPAC '88, a massive naval exercise which included more than 40 ships, approximately 200 aircraft and more than 50,000 sailors, airmen and Marines from the United States, Japan, Australia and Canada. This exercise marked the first inclusion of a battleship, USS Missouri, as a component in RIMPAC.

== Vice Commander, North American Aerospace Defense Command ==
His last assignment on active duty was as Deputy Commander in Chief United States Space Command, dual hatted as Vice Commander, North American Aerospace Defense Command.

In 1987, Hernandez was presented with a Lifetime Achievement Award by the National Puerto Rican Coalition. In 1988, he was named the distinguished graduate of his class by Illinois Institute of Technology and presented with the institutions Professional Achievement Award. Hernandez, retired from the United States Navy in 1991, after having served for a total of 36 years.

== Later years and death ==
Diego E. Hernandez resided in Miami, Florida. He served as management consultant to private and public companies. In 1997 he was named to the board of directors of the Taylor Energy Company LLC. He was also a member of the United States Department of Veterans Affairs Advisory Committee on Minority Veterans. Hernandez was also a Companion of the Naval Order of the United States, the oldest, exclusively naval, American military society. He died at the age of 83 on July 7, 2017.

In 2018 Diego E. Hernández was posthumously inducted to the Puerto Rico Veterans Hall of Fame.

== Awards and decorations ==
Among Vice Admiral Diego E. Hernandez' decorations and medals were the following:

- Navy Distinguished Service Medal
- Silver Star
- Legion of Merit
- Distinguished Flying Cross
- Purple Heart
- Meritorious Service Medal with gold star
- Air Medal with a gold star
- Navy and Marine Corps Commendation Medal with two gold stars and a Combat "V" device
- Navy Unit Commendation with bronze star clasp
- Navy Meritorious Unit Commendation with bronze star clasp
- Navy Expeditionary Medal
- National Defense Service Medal
- Armed Forces Expeditionary Medal
- Vietnam Service Medal with four service stars
- Sea Service Deployment Ribbon
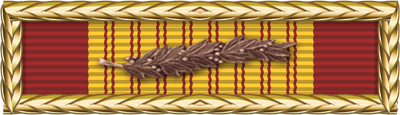
- Republic of Vietnam Gallantry Cross Unit Citation with Palm
- Vietnam Campaign Medal

Badges:

- Naval Aviator Badge

== See also ==
- Hispanic Admirals in the United States Navy
- List of Puerto Ricans
- List of Puerto Rican military personnel
