= USNS Kawishiwi =

Oiler of the United States Navy

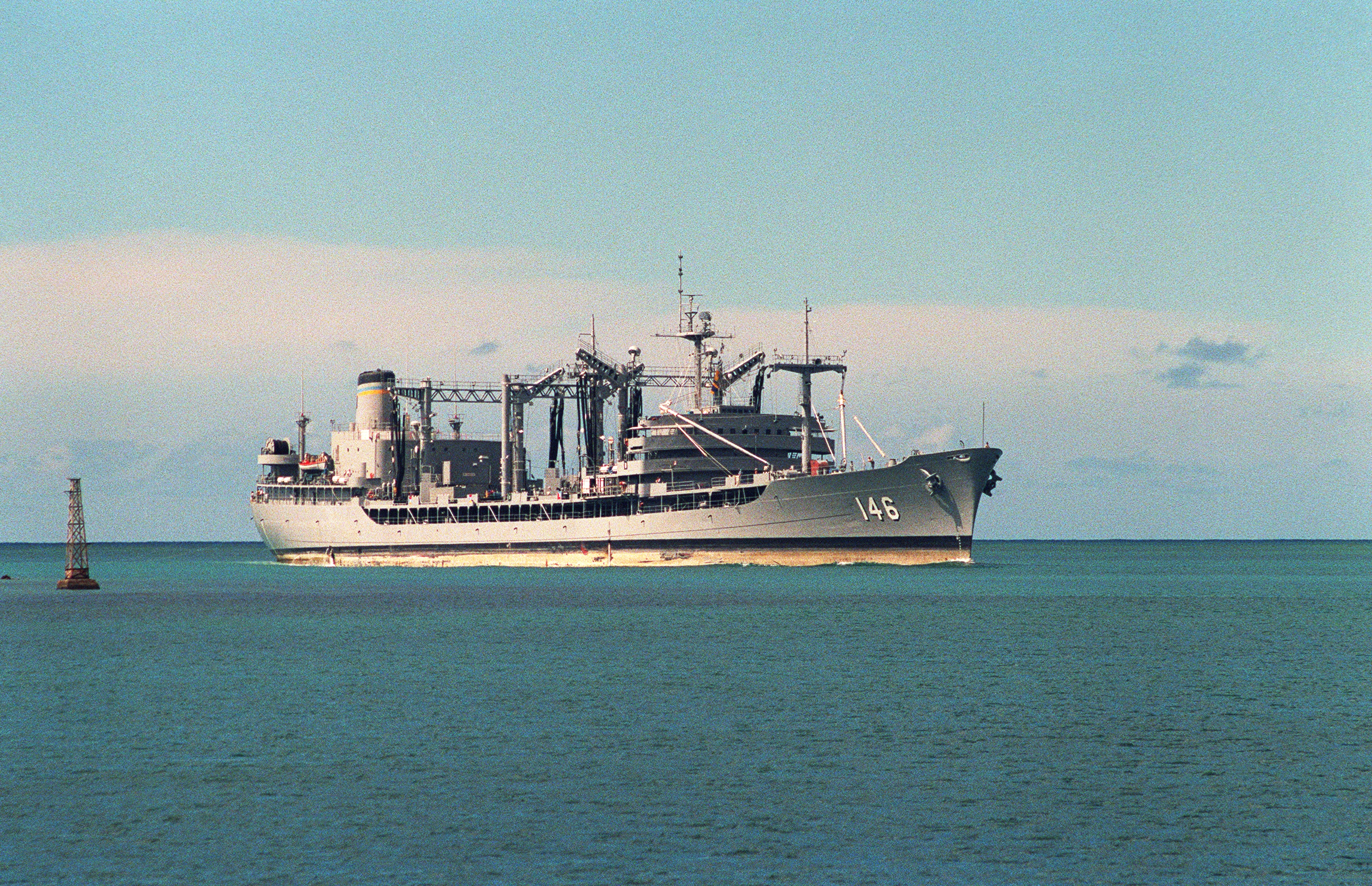
- USNS Kawishiwi (T-AO-146)

History

United States
- Name: USNS Kawishiwi
- Namesake: Kawishiwi River in Minnesota
- Awarded: 28 January 1952
- Builder: New York Shipbuilding Corporation, Camden, New Jersey
- Laid down: 5 October 1953
- Launched: 11 December 1954
- Sponsored by: Mrs. Edmund T. Wooldridge
- Commissioned: 6 July 1955
- Decommissioned: September 1992
- Reclassified: T-AO-143, 1978
- Stricken: 16 February 1994
- Identification: IMO number: 7737078
- Fate: Scrapped

General characteristics
- Class & type: Neosho-class oiler
- Displacement: 11,600 long tons (11,786 t) light; 38,000 long tons (38,610 t) full
- Length: 655 ft (200 m)
- Beam: 86 ft (26 m)
- Draft: 35 ft (11 m)
- Propulsion: 2 geared turbines; 2 boilers; 2 shafts; 28,000 shp (20.9 MW)
- Speed: 20 knots (37 km/h; 23 mph)
- Capacity: 180,000 bbl (29,000 m^{3})
- Complement: USS : 324; USNS : 106 Civilian mariners, 21 Navy
- Armament: 2 × single 5"/38 caliber dual purpose guns; 6 × twin 3"/50 caliber dual purpose guns

Kawishiwi (AO-146) was a Neosho-class replenishment oiler of the United States Navy, in service between 1955 and 1992.

== Service history ==
=== United States Navy, 1954–1979 ===
Kawishiwi was launched 11 December 1954 by New York Shipbuilding Corporation, Camden, N.J.; sponsored by Mrs. Edmund T. Wooldridge; and commissioned 6 July 1955. Kawishiwi cleared Philadelphia 18 November 1955, and arrived at home port Long Beach 8 December for shakedown training. Upon completion of the training, she departed Long Beach 25 April 1956 to replenish ships of the 7th Fleet. She remained in the Far East on refueling operations until returning to Long Beach 10 October. During 1957 the oiler divided the year into refueling duties in the Far East and operations out of Long Beach. Kawishiwi arrived at Pearl Harbor, her home port, 21 January 1958, and 1 month later sailed for her third Westpac deployment. Her ability to refuel ships at a rapid rate increased the mobility of the United States Seventh Fleet as it operated in the Far East.

Kawishiwi sailed once again 18 November, after a 5-month interval of Hawaiian exercises, for duty with Service Force, Pacific Fleet, in the Far East. Carrier task groups were then operating off Taiwan, as the Chinese Nationalist held islands Quemoy-Matsu appeared in danger. The oiler returned Pearl Harbor 23 March 1959 and resumed Hawaiian operations.

Her next Westpac cruise in August was also in the midst of Communist pressure, this time at Laos. However, the show of strength by the United States averted a crisis, and, after completing refueling duties, the oiler arrived Pearl Harbor 23 November. She sailed again 3 May 1960 on her sixth Westpac deployment, replenishing ships of the Taiwan patrol before returning to Hawaii 22 August.

Following replenishment operations in Hawaiian waters, Kawishiwi departed 6 February 1961 for 7th Fleet services. In addition to standing watch over the tense situation in Laos, the Fleet engaged in SEATO exercises in April. The oiler returned home 26 June for a 4-month respite before another Far East tour commencing 23 October. She fueled units of the 7th Fleet as the need for peacekeeping missions by the Navy intensified. Kawishiwi returned to Pearl Harbor 27 February 1962 for overhaul.

From 17 September 1962 to 5 February 1963, she engaged in another Far East deployment with the 7th Fleet. During October she replenished many ships participating in amphibious exercises off Okinawa. Kawishiwi returned home 5 February and operated in Hawaiian waters throughout the year engaging in exercises and replenishment duties. As military operations in Vietnam grew in intensity, her duty in the Orient concentrated more and more on refueling the Navy's ships which were fighting Communist aggression in Southeast Asia. After devoting most of the first half of 1966 to servicing ships off Vietnam, she returned to Pearl Harbor 15 July. Operations in the mid-Pacific ensued until she headed back to the Western Pacific 27 March 1967. Kawishiwi arrived Subic Bay 12 April and fueled the ships of the 7th Fleet through mid-1967.

During the years 1969-1975, Kawishiwi remained in Far East waters supporting military operations off the coast of North and South Vietnam delivering millions of gallons of fuel oil, jet fuel, aviation gasoline 37,800,000 US gallons (143,000 m^{3}) of fuel oil, 19 million US gallons (72,000 m^{3}) of jet fuel and over 200,000 US gallons (760 m^{3}) of aviation gasoline to 271 ships. In addition to her normal petroleum products, Kawishiwi delivered over 290,000 pounds of fleet freight and mail, plus 234 passengers for ships in Vietnamese waters.

During 1970-1971, Kawishiwi once again found herself away from her home port of Pearl Harbor and instead off the coast of Vietnam supporting military operations. During this latest cruise, her sixteenth, under the command of Captain Donald M. Wyand, the Kawishiwi delivered 44 million US gallons (170,000 m^{3}) of fuel to 196 ships. In addition to her normal petroleum products, the Kawishiwi delivered over 250,000 pounds of fleet freight and mail, plus 200 passengers for ships in Vietnamese waters.

=== Military Sealift Command, 1978–1992 ===
Kawishiwi was decommissioned on 10 October 1979, and placed in service with Military Sealift Command as USNS Kawishiwi (T-AO-146), continuing her service with a civilian crew. Additionally, a Military Detachment (MilDet) of approximately twenty sailors was aboard to handle communication and repair of electronic equipment. She was placed out of service in 1992, and struck from the Naval Vessel Register on 7 November 1994.

== Disposal ==
Kawishiwi was transferred to the United States Maritime Administration (MARAD) on 1 May 1999 for lay up in the National Defense Reserve Fleet, Suisun Bay Reserve Fleet in California. On October 27, 2010 the California Ships to Reefs Inc. board approved a plan to "reef" Kawishiwi in 130 ft (40 m) of water about 4 miles (6.4 km) off the coast of Capistrano Beach in southern California, but the plan was later dropped because the ship was deemed unsuitable. The ship was sold for scrapping in early 2014.
