= USS Neosho (AO-143) =

Oiler of the United States Navy

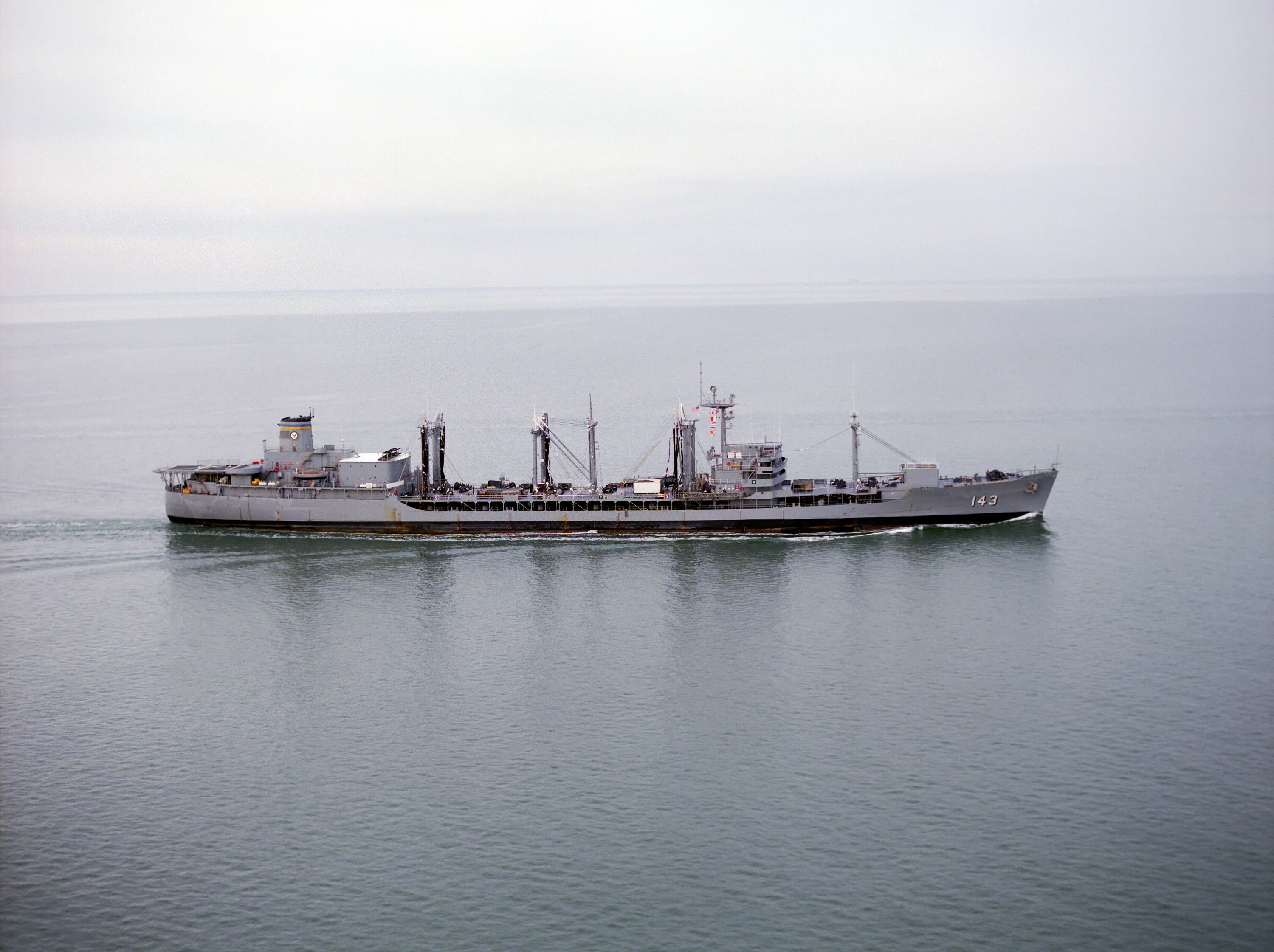
- Neosho in 1985

History

United States
- Name: USS Neosho
- Namesake: Neosho River in Kansas and Oklahoma
- Builder: Fore River Shipyard, Quincy, Massachusetts
- Laid down: 2 September 1952
- Launched: 10 November 1953
- Sponsored by: Nancy (Mrs. John S.)Philips
- Commissioned: 24 September 1954
- Decommissioned: 25 May 1978
- In service: 25 May 1978
- Out of service: 1992
- Reclassified: T-AO-143, 1978
- Stricken: 16 February 1994
- Identification: IMO number: 7737042
- Motto: "Lifeblood of the Fleet"
- Fate: Sold for scrapping, 2 February 2005
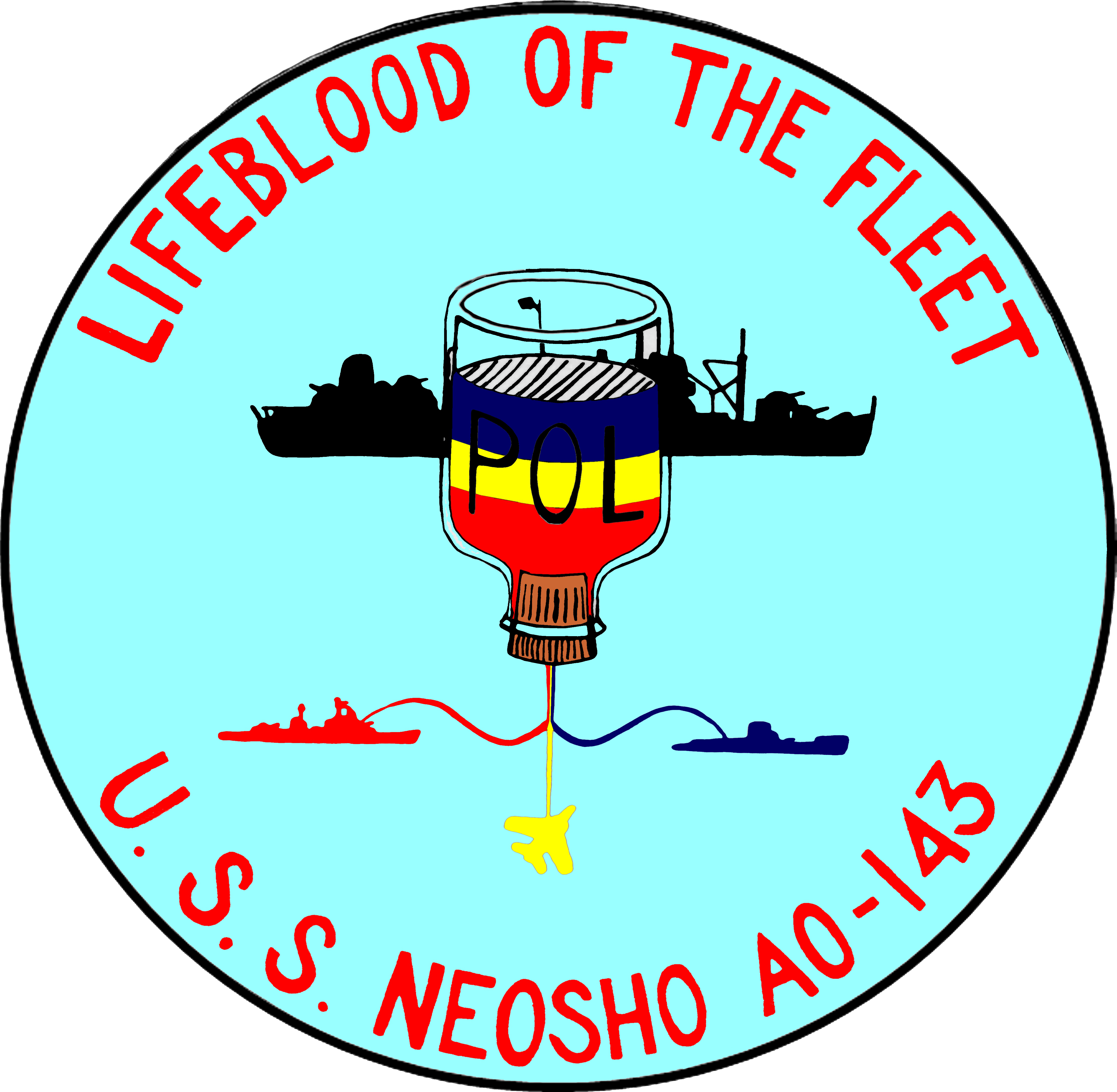
- Badge

General characteristics
- Class & type: Neosho-class oiler
- Displacement: 11,600 long tons (11,786 t) light; 38,000 long tons (38,610 t) full
- Length: 655 ft (200 m)
- Beam: 86 ft (26 m)
- Draft: 35 ft (11 m)
- Propulsion: 2 geared turbines; 2 boilers; 2 shafts; 28,000 shp (20.9 MW)
- Speed: 20 knots (37 km/h; 23 mph)
- Capacity: 180,000 bbl (29,000 m^{3})
- Complement: USS : 324; USNS : 106 Civilian mariners, 21 Navy
- Armament: 2 × single 5"/38 caliber dual purpose guns; 6 × twin 3"/50 caliber dual purpose guns

USS Neosho (AO-143) was the lead ship of her class of fleet oilers of the United States Navy, in service from 1954 to 1992. She was the fourth U.S. Navy ship named Neosho.

== Construction and commissioning ==
Neosho was the first of a class of U.S. Navy fleet oilers designed to combine speed and large cargo capacity for underway replenishment. She was laid down on 15 August 1952 by the Bethlehem Shipbuilding Corporation's Fore River Shipyard at Quincy, Massachusetts, and named Neosho on 29 September 1953. She was launched on 10 November 1953, sponsored by Mrs. Nancy Phillips, wife of Rear Admiral John S. Phillips, the last commanding officer of the oiler USS Neosho (AO-23), which during World War II survived the attack on Pearl Harbor in December 1941 and was sunk during the Battle of the Coral Sea in May 1942. The new Neosho was commissioned on 24 September 1954.

== Service history ==
=== United States Navy, 1954–1978 ===
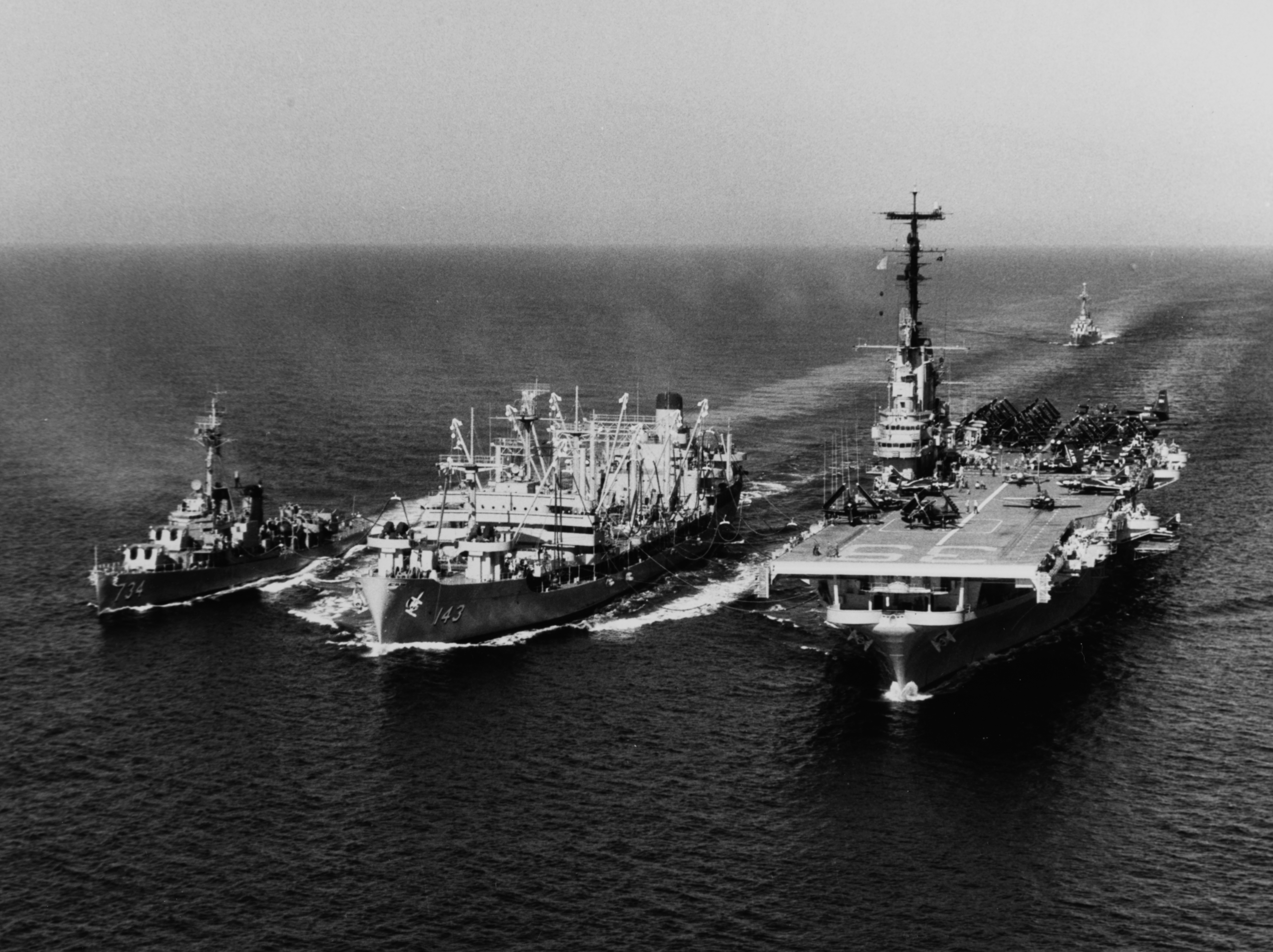
USS Neosho refueling USS Lake Champlain and USS Purdy in the Mediterranean Sea, 20 October 1955

Neosho entered service at Norfolk, Virginia, in the United States Atlantic Fleet on 8 December 1954. A unit of Service Forces, Atlantic Fleet, she operated along the United States East Coast and in the Caribbean until 7 September 1955, when she got underway for her first Mediterranean deployment.

After that initial deployment, Neosho rotated regularly between the United States Sixth Fleet and the United States Second Fleet. During her second Sixth Fleet deployment in the autumn of 1956, she supported units of the Sixth Fleet as they stood by in case they were called on to intervene in the Suez Crisis and the tense period which followed.

In August–September 1958 Neosho joined Task Force 88 for Operation Argus, making three nuclear weapons tests in the South Atlantic Ocean. Her commanding officer served as Commander Task Group 88.3, the Mobile Logistics Group, consisting of Neosho, equipped with United States Air Force MSQ-1 radar and communication vans, the oiler USS Salamonie (AO-26), and destroyers.

In the fall of 1962 Neosho provided logistical support to ships enforcing the naval quarantine (blockade) of Cuba during the Cuban Missile Crisis . From April until July 1964 she had a complete overhaul in dry dock at Baltimore, Maryland. Less than three years later, in 1965, she serviced Atlantic Fleet ships during the political turmoil in the Dominican Republic, which later in 1965 led to the U.S. occupation of that country. By 1967 she had taken part in over 2,500 replenishments to transfer more than 640 million US gallons (2,400,000 m^{3}) of petroleum products under both normal and crisis operational conditions.

In January 1968, Neosho emerged from overhaul at the Norfolk Naval Shipyard at Portsmouth, Virginia, to commence another three-year employment cycle beginning with refresher training and local operations, followed by two seven-month Mediterranean tours sandwiched between duty with the Second Fleet and ending in late 1970 with another overhaul. After routine support operations with the Second and Sixth Fleets, Neosho entered a brief overhaul at Norfolk Naval Shipyard. On 1 February 1972, she supported Operation Springboard in the Puerto Rican operating area, returning to Norfolk in early March 1972 prior to deploying to the Sixth Fleet in April 1972. In the Mediterranean, she conducted about 100 refuelings at sea and port visits to Palma de Majorca, Naples, Athens, Ville de France, and Barcelona.

=== Military Sealift Command, 1978–1992 ===
Neosho was decommissioned on 25 May 1978 and placed in non-commissioned service with the Military Sealift Command as USNS Neosho (T-AO-143), continuing her U.S. Navy service with a civilian crew. She was placed out of service in 1992, and struck from the Naval Vessel Register on 16 February 1994.

== Disposal ==
Neosho was transferred to the United States Maritime Administration (MARAD) on 1 May 1999 for lay-up in the National Defense Reserve Fleet, James River, Fort Eustis, Virginia. She returned to U.S. Navy custody in 2005 and was sold for scrapping on 2 February 2005. The scrapping was completed at International Shipbreaking of Brownsville, Texas, on 8 November 2005.

== Commemoration ==
To honor all auxiliary fleet oilers named after rivers with Native American names, Veterans of Foreign Wars Linden-Tripkos Post #6654 in De Soto, Kansas, installed Neosho′s ship's bell next to the post's gateway memorial. This artifact was a proxy for the previous USS Neosho that served in World War II.
