= USS Roncador =

Former U.S. Navy Balao-class submarine

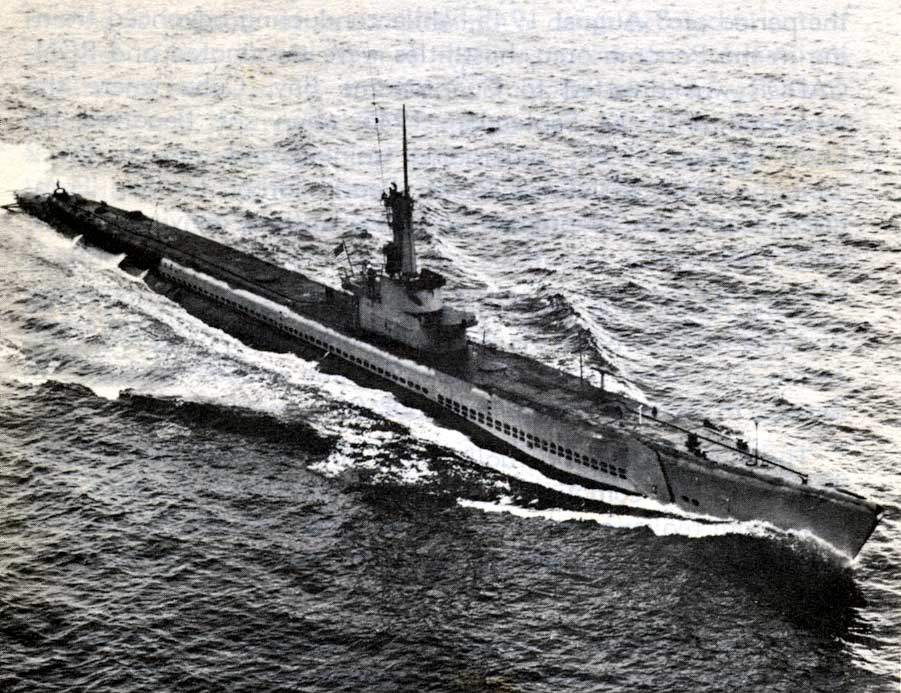

History

United States
- Name: Roncador
- Builder: Cramp Shipbuilding Company, Philadelphia, Pennsylvania
- Yard number: 556
- Laid down: 21 April 1943
- Launched: 14 May 1944
- Sponsored by: Mrs. Thomas B. Klakring
- Commissioned: 27 March 1945
- Decommissioned: 1 June 1946
- Stricken: 1 December 1971
- Fate: Sold 2 January 1973; Scrapped ca. 1982

General characteristics
- Class & type: Balao class diesel-electric submarine
- Displacement: 1,526 tons (1,550 t) surfaced; 2,424 tons (2,463 t) submerged
- Length: 311 ft 8 in (95.00 m)
- Beam: 27 ft 3 in (8.31 m)
- Draft: 16 ft 10 in (5.13 m) maximum
- Propulsion: 4 × Fairbanks-Morse Model 38D8-1/8 9-cylinder opposed-piston diesel engines driving electrical generators; 2 × 126-cell Sargo batteries; 4 × high-speed Elliott electric motors with reduction gears; 2 × propellers; 5,400 shp (4.0 MW) surfaced; 2,740 shp (2.04 MW) submerged
- Speed: 20.25 knots (38 km/h) surfaced; 8.75 knots (16 km/h) submerged
- Range: 11,000 nautical miles (20,000 km) surfaced at 10 knots (19 km/h)
- Endurance: 48 hours at 2 knots (3.7 km/h) submerged; 75 days on patrol
- Test depth: 400 ft (120 m)
- Complement: 10 officers, 70–71 enlisted
- Armament: 10 × 21-inch (533 mm) torpedo tubes; 6 forward, 4 aft; 24 torpedoes; 1 × 5-inch (127 mm) / 25 caliber deck gun; Bofors 40 mm and Oerlikon 20 mm cannon

USS Roncador (SS/AGSS/IXSS-301), a Balao-class submarine, was a ship of the United States Navy named for the roncador.

== Construction and commissioning ==
The Roncador was laid down on 21 April 1943 by the Cramp Shipbuilding Company at Philadelphia, Pennsylvania, launched on 14 May 1944, sponsored by Mrs. Thomas B. Klakring, and commissioned on 27 March 1945.

== Service history ==
Following commissioning, the Roncador conducted shakedown exercises into late May 1945; on 26 May 1945, she arrived at Port Everglades, Florida. Based there for two months, she assisted in the development of antisubmarine warfare techniques. On 29 July 1945 she got underway for Panama and, from 3 August through the end of World War II in mid-August 1945, conducted advanced training exercises off the Panama Canal Zone.

In late August 1945, she proceeded to Guantanamo Bay, Cuba, then in mid-September 1945 headed for the Pacific She arrived at Pearl Harbor, Hawaii, on 3 October 1945 and remained in Hawaiian waters into 1946. On 3 January 1946, she got underway for San Francisco, California, and inactivation.

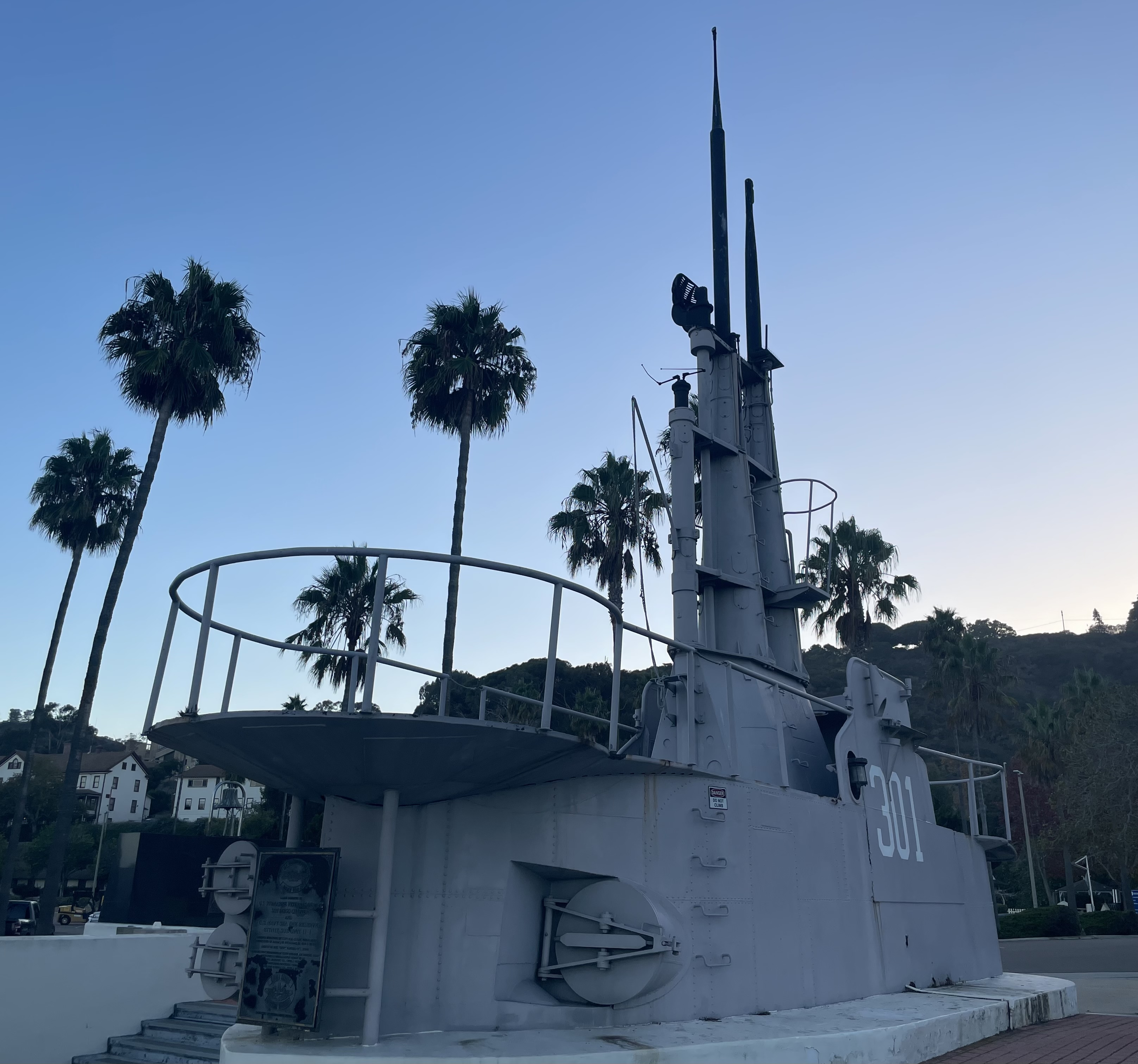
Roncador′s conning tower at the Submarine Memorial at Naval Base Point Loma, San Diego, California.

== Decommissioning and disposal ==
The Roncador was decommissionedon 1 June 1946 and through the 1950s remained in the inactive fleet. In February 1960, she was taken out of reserve fleet and assigned to United States Naval Reserve training duty in the 11th Naval District in a non-commissioned status. Reclassified as an auxiliary submarine and accordingly redesignated AGSS-301 on 1 December 1962, she continued training duty, at Naval Station Long Beach on Terminal Island in Los Angeles, California, until 1 December 1971, at which time she was stricken from the Naval Vessel Register, reclassified as a "miscellaneous unclassified submarine," and redesignated IXSS-301.

Plans were made for Roncadaor to be used as a museum ship at Ports O' Call Village in San Pedro, California, but they fell through. Instead she was sold for scrapping on 2 January 1973. Instead of being scrapped, however, she was placed on display for a brief period of time circa February 1976 at King Harbor in Redondo Beach, California.

She was resold in September 1976 to Nicolai Joffe of Beverly Hills, California, and subsequently portrayed the fictional submarine USS Sea Tiger — painted pink for the role — in the ABC situation comedy Operation Petticoat, which aired in the United States from September 1977 to October 1978. The Naval Vessel Register on 1 October 1982 listed her as having been sold again for scrapping.

== Commemoration ==
The Roncador′s conning tower was preserved and was displayed for several years at the National Museum of the United States Navy at the Washington Navy Yard in Washington, D.C. It then was moved to Naval Base Point Loma in San Diego, California, where it now resides as the centerpiece of the Submarine Memorial at Ballast Point.
