= USS Potomac =

USS Potomac or USNS Potomac may refer to one of these United States Navy ships:

- USS Potomac (1822), a frigate in commission from 1831 to 1877
- USS Potomac (1861), a whaler purchased in 1861 and sunk as part of the "Stone Fleet" in 1862
- USS Potomac (AT-50), a tug in commission from 1898 to 1922
- USS Potomac (AG-25), a presidential yacht in service from 1936 to 1945
- USNS Potomac (T-AO-150), an oiler in service from 1957 until destroyed in a fire in 1961
- USNS Potomac (T-AO-181), an oiler in service from 1976 to 1983
- USS Potomac (SSN-814), an attack submarine announced in 2025
