= USS Klakring =

Former frigate of the US Navy

USS Klakring (FFG-42)
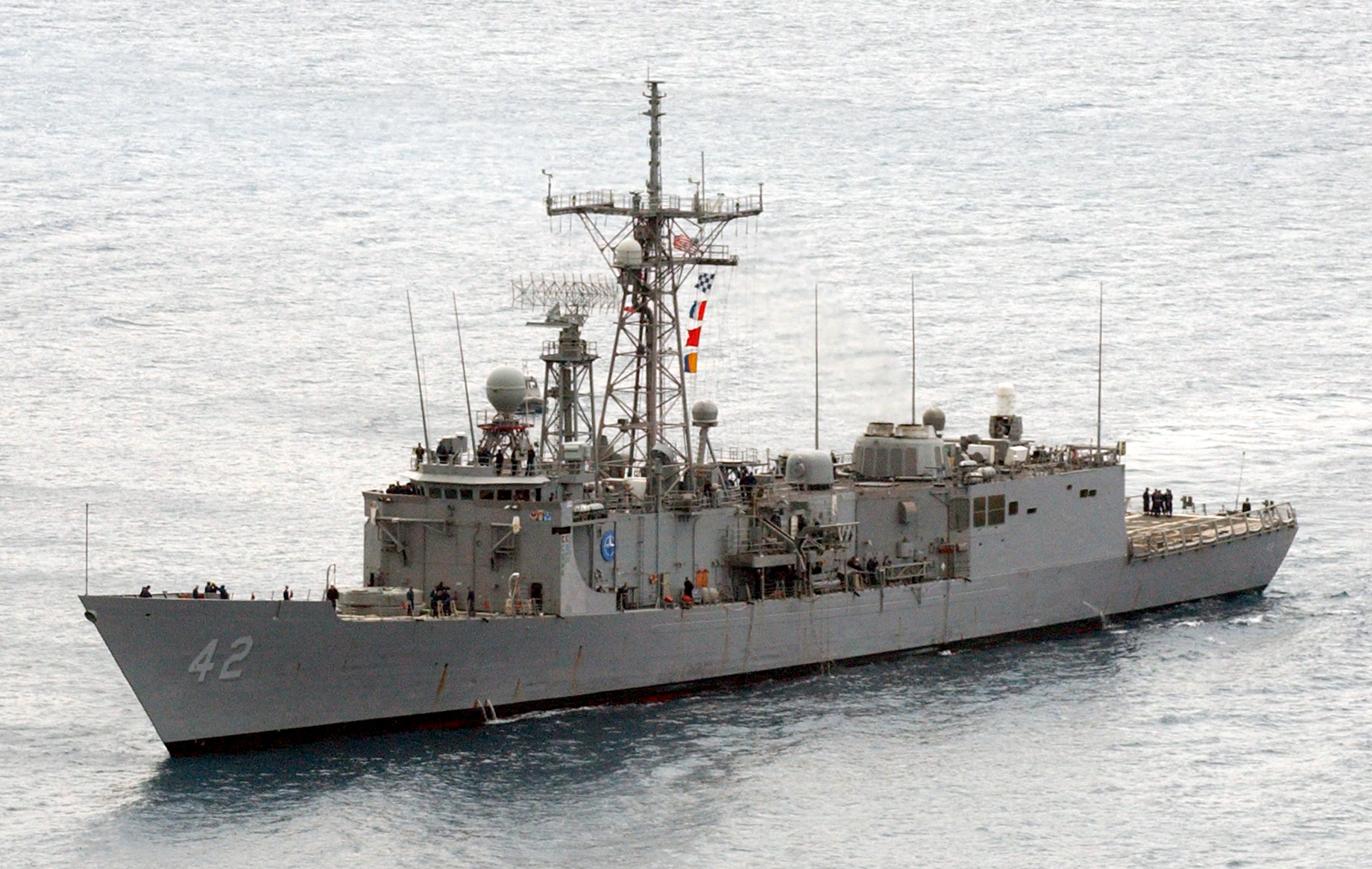
- USS Klakring arrives for a brief port visit at Souda Bay in 2004.

History

United States
- Name: Klakring
- Namesake: Rear Admiral Thomas B. Klakring
- Awarded: 27 April 1979
- Builder: Bath Iron Works, Bath, Maine
- Laid down: 19 February 1982
- Launched: 18 September 1982
- Sponsored by: Mrs. Beverly Bohen
- Commissioned: 20 August 1983
- Decommissioned: 22 March 2013
- Stricken: 22 March 2013
- Home port: Mayport, Florida
- Identification: Hull symbol:FFG-42; Code letters:NTBK
- Motto: "Freedom Through Vigilance"
- Fate: Sunk as target ship 2026
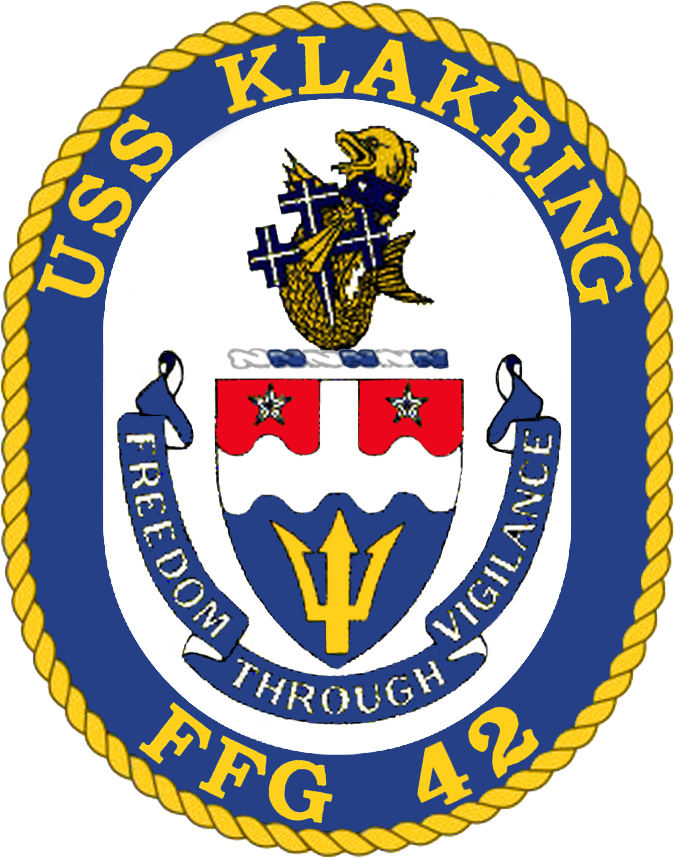
- Badge

General characteristics
- Class & type: Oliver Hazard Perry-class frigate
- Displacement: 4,100 long tons (4,200 t), full load
- Length: 453 feet (138 m), overall
- Beam: 45 feet (14 m)
- Draft: 22 feet (6.7 m)
- Propulsion: 2 × General Electric LM2500-30 gas turbines generating 41,000 shp (31 MW) through a single shaft and variable pitch propeller; 2 × Auxiliary Propulsion Units, 350 hp (260 kW) retractable electric azimuth thrusters for maneuvering and docking.
- Speed: over 29 knots (54 km/h)
- Range: 5,000 nautical miles at 18 knots (9,300 km at 33 km/h)
- Complement: 15 officers and 190 enlisted, plus SH-60 LAMPS detachment of roughly six officer pilots and 15 enlisted maintainers
- Sensors & processing systems: AN/SPS-49 air-search radar; AN/SPS-55 surface-search radar; CAS and STIR fire-control radar; AN/SQS-56 sonar.
- Electronic warfare & decoys: AN/SLQ-32
- Armament: As built: 1 × OTO Melara Mk 75 76 mm/62 caliber naval gun; 2 × Mk 32 triple-tube (324 mm) launchers for Mark 46 torpedoes; 1 × Vulcan Phalanx CIWS; 4 × .50-cal (12.7 mm) machine guns.; 1 × Mk 13 Mod 4 single-arm launcher for Harpoon anti-ship missiles and SM-1MR Standard anti-ship/air missiles (40 round magazine); Note: As of 2004, Mk 13 systems removed from all active US vessels of this class.
- Aircraft carried: 2 × SH-60 LAMPS III helicopters
- Aviation facilities: 2 × hangars; RAST helicopter hauldown system

USS Klakring (FFG-42) was a Oliver Hazard Perry class frigate of the United States Navy named for Rear Admiral Thomas B. Klakring (1904–1975), who was awarded three Navy Crosses as commander of the submarine USS Guardfish during World War II.

== Construction and commissioning ==
Klakring was laid down on 19 February 1982 by the Bath Iron Works Corp. Bath, Maine; launched on 18 September 1982, sponsored by Beverly Bohen, niece of Rear Admiral Klakring, and commissioned on 20 August 1983 at Bath.

== Service history ==
=== 1983–1989 ===
1983

Klakring completed a light-off examination on 8 September 1983, followed on 15 September by her initial crew certification. Prior to leaving for Charleston, South Carolina, Klakring visited Newport, Rhode Island while the America's Cup race was underway. New crew members had their first land leave after their first days at sea. The ship reached her initial home port of Charleston, South Carolina, on 18 September. Family members and friends on the pier displayed homemade banners while they welcomed the ship as she maneuvered up the Cooper River on 28 September.

The ship sailed for her shakedown cruise to Caribbean waters. She visited St. Thomas, Virgin Islands (4–7 November 1983), and on 13 November put into Guantánamo Bay, Cuba. Klakring sailed on 3 December, carried out a weapons systems accuracy test at Port Everglades, Florida, and then test-fired torpedoes on the range at Atlantic Undersea Test and Evaluation Center (AUTEC), Andros Island, on 13 December. She returned to Charleston on 16 December.

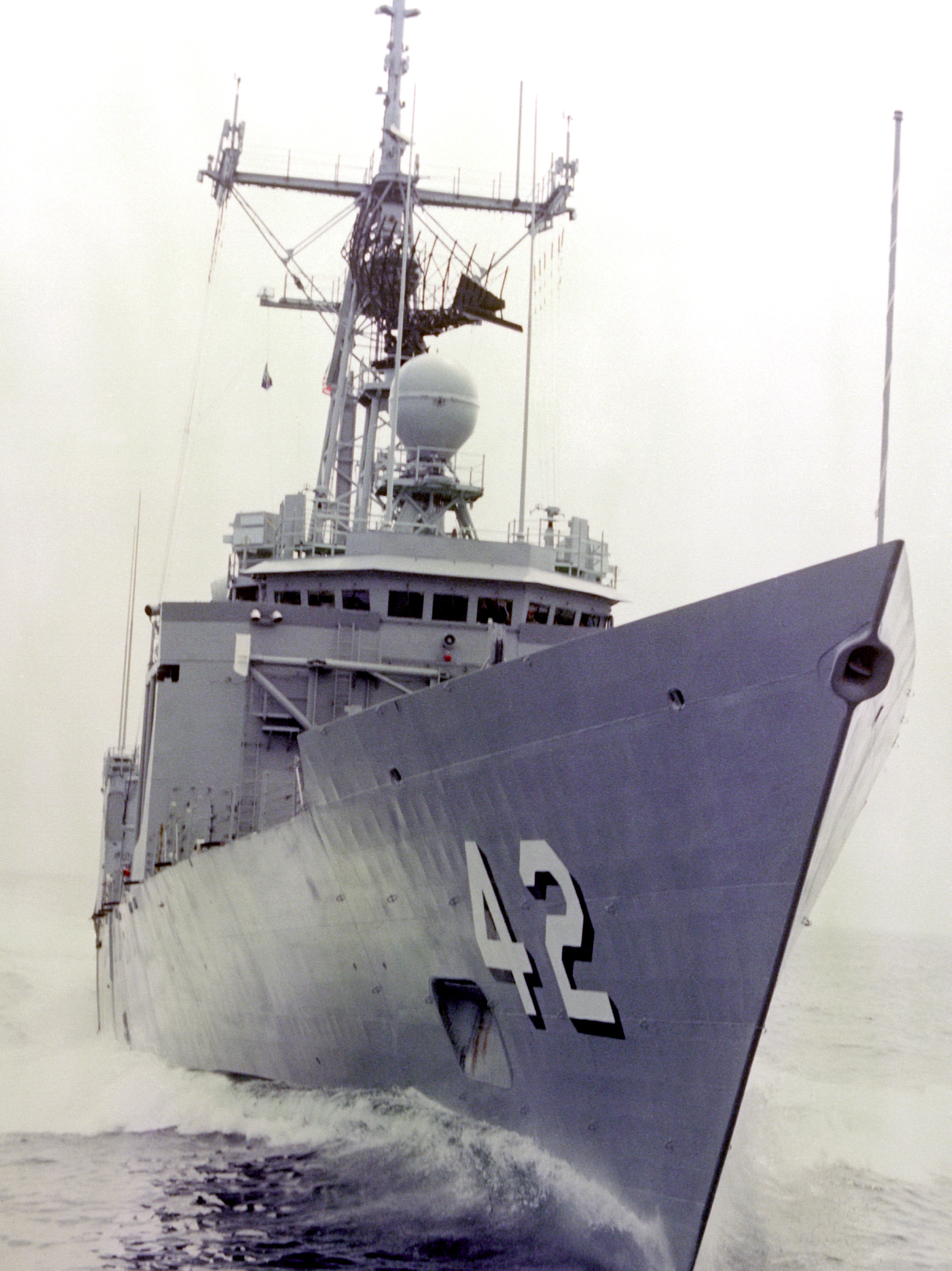
Klakring in June 1983

1984

Klakring carried out additional training during the New Year 1984, including a visit to Nassau, Bahamas (27–30 January 1984), a brief stop for fuel in Frederiksted, St. Croix, Virgin Islands, and another port visit on 18 February to Naval Station Roosevelt Roads, Puerto Rico. Klakring completed her Post Shakedown Availability at Bath (5 April–23 August). The yard work included the installation of fin stabilizers. The ship conducted her sea trials on 29 September, and on loaded weapons from Norfolk, Virginia, on 7 September. Hurricane Diana swept up the East Coast and delayed the frigate's return to Charleston from her scheduled date of 11 to 16 September. The ship completed a variety of training during the succeeding weeks, and escorted the aircraft carrier Nimitz during mid November.

1985

Klakring sailed for nearly five weeks of refresher training off Guantánamo Bay on 14 January 1985. On 21 February, Helicopter Antisubmarine Squadron (Light—HSL-42) Detachment 3, equipped with a single Sikorsky SH-60B Seahawk Light Airborne Multi-Purpose System (LAMPS) Mk III, embarked on board Klakring. The ship began participation in her first major fleet exercise, Composite Unit Training Exercise (COMTUEX) 2-85, on 22 April 1985. She broke up the training with a three-day visit to Frederiksted, U.S. Virgin Islands, and returned to Charleston on 8 May.

The destroyer Comte de Grasse and Klakring sailed as MEF 3-85 Transit Group for the Middle East Force on 7 June 1985, in Klakring's first overseas deployment. Comdr. Whalig served as the group's officer in tactical command (OTC). The two ships fueled and provisioned at Ponta Delgada, Azores, on 13 June, entered the United States Sixth Fleet, and stopped for additional fuel and supplies at Rota, Spain, on 16 June. Klakring visited Palma de Mallorca, Spain (18–21 June). The ship then crossed the Mediterranean by easterly courses.

Klakring passed southbound through the Suez Canal on 25 and 26 June 1985. As the ship crossed the Red Sea, she began to observe the weekends on Thursdays and Fridays to assimilate crewmen to Muslim daily routines. Klakring fueled and provisioned at Djibouti, Horn of Africa, on 30 June. On 1 July, she rendezvoused with guided missile destroyer Charles F. Adams and exchanged information and equipment. Whalig became Commander Task Unit (CTU) 109.1.2, and oversaw the scheduling of all multi-ship training in the Persian Gulf. Klakring sailed through the Strait of Hormuz, and on 7 July rendezvoused with command ship La Salle near Abu Dhabi, United Arab Emirates (UAE). Klakring escorted the flagship to Sitrah, Bahrain.

During the ship's first two months in the Persian Gulf, visibility averaged barely 2 mi (3.2 km) because of haze, sand, and dust. The daily temperature repeatedly rose to 117 °F (47 °C) with 90% humidity. The frigate's Seahawk flew an average of two sorties per day, and the crew reported that the presence of the strong temperature inversion made radar ranges of 160 nautical miles at altitudes below 500 ft (150 m) common, which extended the helicopters' patrol coverage of the region.

The ship next visited Al Jubayl, Saudi Arabia (14–17 July 1985), briefly patrolled the Persian Gulf, and then completed upkeep at Mina Salman, Bahrain (22–31 July). On 6 August, Klakring escorted La Salle, and fueled and provisioned at Sitrah on 20 August. Klakring sailed from the Persian Gulf, and from 25 to 28 August visited Karachi, Pakistan. She passed through the Strait of Hormuz into the Persian Gulf on 31 August, and completed an additional upkeep at Dubai, UAE (3–10 September). The ship anchored at Sitrah for a Combat Systems Groom (13–15 September). On 20 September, she sailed from the Persian Gulf and trained with the Indian Ocean Battle Group, focusing on aircraft carrier operations, anti-air warfare, underway replenishment, and antisubmarine warfare. Klakring returned to the Persian Gulf on 24 September, training along the way with French aviso Quartier-Maître Anquetil.

After topping off her fuel and provisions on 26 October 1985, Klakring made for Ash Shuaibah, Kuwait, as the flagship for Commander Middle East Force. The ship patrolled the Persian Gulf, and completed upkeep at Mina Salman (30 October – 4 November). The guided missile frigate Gallery relieved Klakring in the Persian Gulf on 6 and 7 November. On 9 November, Klakring rendezvoused with Comte de Grasse and the two ships formed a transit group back to the United States. Comdr. Wahlig again served as OTC for the group.

Klakring fueled and provisioned at Djibouti on 11 November 1985, and continued northward across the Red Sea, returning to the standard workweek when she reached the southern entrance to the Suez Canal on 15 November. The following day, both ships transited the canal northbound, and visited Málaga, Spain (20–23 November). On 24 November, Klakring fueled and provisioned at Rota on 24 November, and that same afternoon entered the Second Fleet. The frigate celebrated Thanksgiving in Ponta Delgada, and returned to Charleston on 6 December 1985. On 12 December, Comdr. James M. Coon relieved Comdr. Wahlig as the commanding officer.

1986

The ship carried out Combined at Sea Operations (CASTOPS) 2-86 (3–15 February 1986), including a visit to Nassau in the Bahamas (8–11 February). Klakring underwent an Operational Propulsion Plant Examination (OPPE) from 26 to 28 April, 1 and 2 May, and 29 and 30 May. The ship visited Savannah, Georgia, on 27 and 28 June. Klakring trained with Nimitz from 8 to 17 July 1986, including a visit to Port Everglades (11–14 July). On 31 July and 1 August, the ship conducted special projects for the Chief of Naval Operations (CNO).

Following her CNO project and a visit to Dodge Island Terminal, Miami, Florida (8–10 September) Klakring held a Tiger Cruise for her crew's dependants, on 11 September 1986. While the ship sailed to the operating area, she received a distress call from King Fisher II, a small fishing boat from Charleston. Klakring proceeded at full speed to King Fisher II and transferred her emergency party via small boat to render assistance. The frigate returned to port on 12 September. On 29 September she offloaded her weapons at the Naval Weapons Station Charleston, and completed her first Selective Restricted Availability (SRA-1) from 30 September to 5 December. On 12 December, Klakring re-loaded her weapons from the Naval Weapons Station, and carried out her sea trials (15–18 December).

1987

Klakring completed a number of training exercises during the New Year, including Fleet Exercise (FLEETEX) 1-87 and a War at Sea scenario (10–27 February 1987), and Solid Shield 87, FLEETEX 2-87, and another War at Sea scenario from 30 April to 10 May. Klakring deployed from Charleston for the Middle East on 6 June 1987. On 8 June she rendezvoused with the other ships of her transit group, and refueled at Rota on 15 June. The frigate visited Taormina, Sicily (19–21 June). She passed through the Suez Canal into the Red Sea on 24 June, and on 29 June refueled at Djibouti.

The ship supported Operation Earnest Will. The Iranians and Iraqis escalated their attacks against ships sailing in the Persian Gulf during the Iran–Iraq War, and the U.S. launched operation Earnest Will to maintain freedom of navigation in the area, renaming and reflagging eleven Kuwaiti tankers. Klakring patrolled the Persian Gulf between Radar Picket Stations North and South. The ship repeatedly passed outbound through the Strait of Hormuz to refuel from underway replenishment ships, and then returned to the Persian Gulf. On 10 August, Klakring embarked a detachment of Army helicopters and helped coordinate the efforts of British tugs converted for minesweeping. SS Bridgeton—reflagged tanker Al Rekkah—struck an Iranian mine on 24 July, but survived; Klakring escorted Bridgeton outbound through the Strait of Hormuz on 30 August.

The frigate rendezvoused with cargo ship Courier and steamship President Pierce, and escorted them to Fujairah (2 and 3 September 1987). On 3 September, she escorted tanker Sealift Mediterranean to Bahrain. Klakring escorted tanker Sealift Pacific through the Strait of Hormuz on 1 October. Klakring passed outbound through the Strait of Hormuz and anchored at Fujairah on 24 October. The guided missile frigate Carr relieved Klakring on 26 October. Klakring refueled at Djibouti on 29 October, visited Jeddah, Saudi Arabia (1–4 November), passed northbound through the Suez Canal on 7 November, and (12–16 November) visited Saint Raphael, France. The ship put into Palma de Mallorca (17–21 November), on 22 November refueled at Rota, refueled again at Ponta Delgada on 26 November, and returned to Charleston on 4 December.

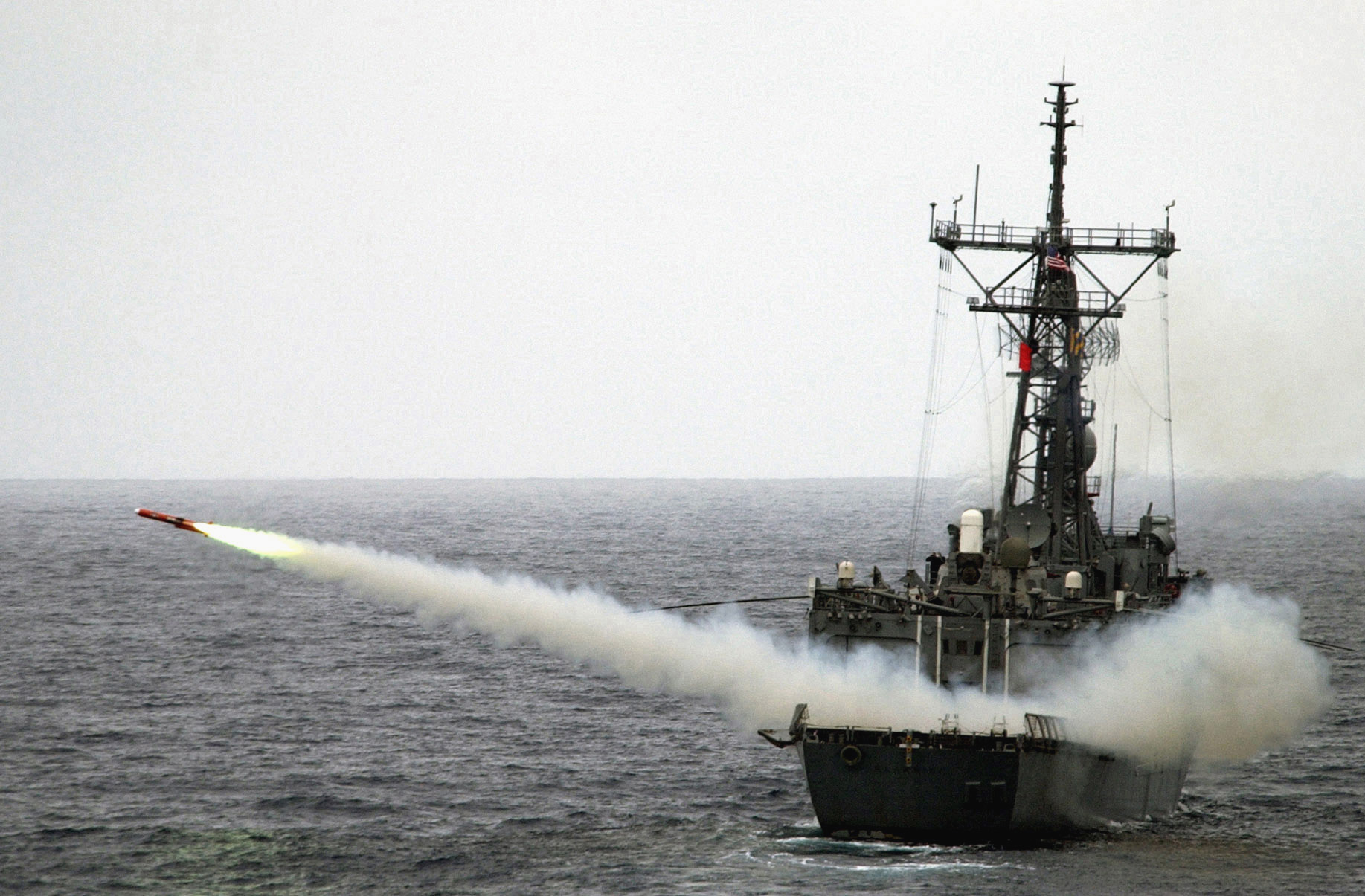
Klakring launches a drone in July 2002 as part of an exercise

Klakring participated in Operation Earnest Will in the Persian Gulf in 1987 as the first air-capable, air-embarked ship. The frigate participated in Operation Prime Chance in the Persian Gulf during the "Tanker War".

1988

CMDR Dennis J. Van Buskirk relieved CMDR Coon as the commanding officer on 22 January 1988. Klakring completed repairs in drydock at Jacksonville Shipyards, Florida (1–22 February). The ship carried out Interim Readiness Training with Task Group (TG) 43.2 at Guantánamo Bay (21 March–13 April). A variety of training exercises followed, broken by a visit to Ft. Lauderdale, Florida (8–13 May). She carried out further training, refueled at Roosevelt Roads on 18 May, visited St. Thomas (18–21 May), and on 27 May returned to Charleston. Klakring loaded a Coast Guard Rigid Inflatable Boat in preparation for her Caribbean Law Enforcement Operations (CDOPs) on 13 June 1988, setting sail the following day. The ship embarked a helicopter detachment at Mayport, Florida, on 18 June, and the following day the remaining Coast Guardsmen boarded with their equipment at Miami. Klakring participated in CDOPs (22 June–8 July), and returned to Charleston on 13 July.

The ship took part in Middle East Force Exercise (MEFEX) 1-89 with destroyer O'Bannon and guided missile frigates De Wert and Hawes in the Caribbean (12–28 October 1988). On 19 October, Klakring and De Wert anchored off Vieques Island, Puerto Rico, for drills with a Navy Sea, Air, Land (SEAL) team. Klakring also conducted flight operations with Army helicopters on 27 October.

1989

Klakring began her duties as host ship for the West German frigate Rheinland-Pfalz on 14 March 1989.

Klakring took part in FLEETEX 3-89 (13–28 April).

Klakring deployed as part of MED 3-89 on 31 May 1989. The group comprised aircraft carrier Coral Sea, guided missile cruisers Mississippi, San Jacinto, and Thomas S. Gates, guided missile destroyer John King, guided missile frigate Kauffman, frigates Ainsworth and Aylwin, amphibious assault ship Nassau, amphibious transport dock Shreveport, tank landing ship Barnstable County, oiler Monongahela, ammunition ship Butte, and destroyer tender Shenandoah.

While Klakring passed through the Strait of Gibraltar at 0400 on 11 June, she launched her helicopter in 44-knot winds. The ship relieved Charles F. Adams on 14 June. In company with San Jacinto she passed northbound through the Dardanelles and Bosporus on 18 June, and visited Constanta, Romania (19–22 June). Comdr. Van Buskirk and Capt. H. Ward Clark, the Commanding Office of San Jacinto, were flown to Bucharest to meet with Romanian defense leaders.

Klakring returned through the Bosporus and anchored at Istanbul, Turkey, on 23 June. On 27 June, she sailed southbound through the Dardanelles, and completed an intermediate maintenance availability with Haifa Shipyard, Ltd., Haifa, Israel, from 30 June to 10 July. Following her maintenance, she took part in Noble Dina 3, a joint US-Israeli naval exercise (10–13 July). She visited Alexandria, Egypt (19–24 July), and returned to Haifa (28–31 July). Rear Adm. Richard C. Macke, Commander Carrier Group 2, boarded the ship before her departure.

Klakring set a course for Palma, Spain, but on 1 August 1989, Arab terrorists in Beirut hanged Lt. Col. William R. Higgins, USMC, a member of the UN peacekeeping forces in Lebanon, and threatened to murder additional hostages they held. Klakring steamed to Alexandria, where Admiral Macke boarded Coral Sea, and the carrier made for the Eastern Mediterranean as a show of force. Klakring spent August off the Lebanese coast on contingency operations.

Mississippi, Kauffman, and Klakring visited Marseille, France (4–13 September 1989). Klakring participated in Display Determination, a multi-national exercise involving U.S., Italian, Spanish, and Turkish forces, across the Mediterranean and Aegean Seas (13 September–2 October). During the exercise, Klakring received word that Hurricane Hugo had devastated Charleston. The Wives Support Group and the ship's Ombudsman, Janice Moore, confirmed that none of the crewmen's dependents sustained serious injuries. The ship took part in the 39th activation of Naval on Call Forces, Mediterranean, at Ancona, Italy (9–14 October 1989), and in the seaward exercise of the commemoration, Deterrent Force 2-89 (14–19 October). Klakring operated with British destroyer Coventry and fast fleet tanker Olmeda, Descubierta, Elli, Euro, Kılıç Ali Paşa, and West German destroyer Schleswig-Holstein. The exercise concluded with a briefing in Augusta Bay, Sicily. The frigate Bowen relieved Klakring at Alicante, Spain, on 27 October. Three days later, Klakring put to sea, and on 10 November she returned to Charleston.

=== 1990–1999 ===
1990

Klakring began 1990 in Port of Charleston, South Carolina, after returning from a Mediterranean cruise in November.

In January, Klakring spent most of her time in the Charleston and Jacksonville OPAREA's, conducting exercises. After completing a combat Systems Assessment on 10 January, the ship arrived in Port Everglades, Florida on 13 January for a five-day port visit. While transiting back to Charleston, the ship encountered extremely rough weather with high winds and heavy seas. The Commanding Officer made the decision to enter port at night due to heavy weather, and the crew successfully conducted a difficult navigation detail in the Cooper River and returned Klakring to homeport during the stormy night.

The last two weeks of February were spent preparing for Type Commander's Core Training (TCCT) 2-90 and conducting deck landing qualifications with Helicopter Anti-Submarine Light FORTY SIX in the Jacksonville OPAREA. On 22 February, the ship rendezvoused with the frigate Truett and submarine San Juan just east of the Bahamas. Klakring arrived in Roosevelt Roads, Puerto Rico on 26 February, loaded exercise torpedoes, and was underway to the Puerto Rico OPAREA to begin TCCT 2-90.

During TCCT 2-90, the ship participated in numerous tracking and gunnery exercises, underway refuelings, highline transfers, and anti-submarine warfare evolutions, and conducted two live missile firings along with the cruiser Mississippi. Only the second of the two missiles engaged the target due to a failure on the first; this provided critical data about the performance of one of the Navy's primary weapons.

In March there was an Operational Propulsion Plant Examination (OPPE) and a Change of Command Ceremony. The two-day engineering inspection was completed on 23 March. On 30 March, CDR Larry J. Carter relieved CDR Dennis J. Van Buskirk as the fourth Commanding Officer of the frigate.

On 5 April, the ship began her preliminary preparations for her scheduled Dry-Docking Selective Restricted Availability (DSRA) by offloading ammunition and weapons at the Charleston Naval Weapons Station, and transferring non-essential ammunition to the frigate Fahrion.

On 14 May, the ship was underway en route to Mayport Naval Station, Florida to make final preparations to enter the shipyard. All hands participated in an Integrated Logistics Overhaul offload of all shipboard parts and supplies completed on 16 May, and, on 23 May, Klakring was dry-docked at Atlantic Dry Dock facility to begin the DSRA. The crew stayed in the Jacksonville Airport Days Inn Motel for 74 days until their return in early August. On 27 August, installation of the SQR-19 Tactical Towed Array Sonar System began.

Klakring started September preparing for the most important of a continued series of inspections: the Propulsion Examination Board Light-Off Examination (LOE). LOE commenced on 10 September and on 12 September she was "certified to steam." On 14 September the ship was underway for the final phase of the overhaul, the post-DSRA sea trials. All systems proved reliable and Klakring was delivered on 17 September, thirty-one days ahead of schedule and under budget. The ship remained at the Mayport Naval Station for another month.

On 25 October, the ship got underway from Mayport and arrived at homeport Charleston the following day. Upon arrival, there was a Welcome Home Party held on board for the crew's families and friends.

Klakring was scheduled to participate in Caribbean Law Enforcement Operations in November, but a post-overhaul hull inspection determined that the ship's hull needed repainting, which was done from 7 to 21 November at the Charleston Naval Shipyard dry dock. The ship received full aviation certification on 27 November, and began final preparations for a Harpoon Missile Tactical Qualification.

On 5 December, the ship was underway to embark HSL-48's Lamps MK III crew to participate in Destroyer Squadron Six "Operation Greyhound" for two days, focused on ship maneuvering and communications. Klakring turned north on 7 December en route to the Boston OPAREA to conduct at-sea evaluations of the Navy's new Mk 50 torpedo, which were prevented by adverse weather conditions. The ship returned to Charleston on 19 December and began another extensive inspection the following day. The ship's Training Readiness Evaluation was completed on 21 December and the holiday stand-down period began with a children's Christmas party held on board.

USS Klakring ended 1990 in port at Charleston.

1991

On the day after Thanksgiving 1991, the ship went underway for a six-month cruise to the Persian Gulf for Operation Desert Shield. The ship conducted exercises in the Mediterranean with an eight-day stop in Haifa, Israel, then traversed the Suez Canal.

=== 2000–2012 ===
From August to November 2000, USS Klakring (FFG-42) participated in UNITAS 41, conducting exercises with Latin American partner navies and circumnavigating South America.

From 2001, Klakring was homeported at NAVSTA Mayport, Florida, and was part of Destroyer Squadron 14. In March 2008 and 2009, the ship was the subject of protests from pro-Russian activists in Sevastopol, Ukraine, when she visited the port for five-day "friendly" visits.

== Decommissioned 2013, sunk 2026 ==
Klakring was decommissioned on 22 March 2013 at Naval Station Mayport, and towed to Naval Inactive Ship Maintenance Facility Philadelphia.

Klakring was used as a target ship in a sinking exercise (SINKEX) in exercise Atlantic Thunder 26 on 25 September 2026 at the UK Ministry of Defence's Hebrides range by missiles and torpedoes fired by the US Navy and Royal Navy. She was damaged by Standard Missile SM 6 missiles from USS Paul Ignatius, and Naval Strike Missiles and Sea Venom missiles from HMS Portland, then was torpedoed and sunk by USS Massachusetts using a Mk 48 Advanced Capability Torpedo.

== Awards ==

Navy Unit Commendation
Navy Meritorious Unit Commendation	Navy E Ribbon 2nd award	National Defense Service Medal w/1 star
Armed Forces Expeditionary Medal w/2 stars	Southwest Asia Service Medal w/1 star	Global War on Terrorism Expeditionary Medal
Global War on Terrorism Service Medal	Armed Forces Service Medal w/7 stars	Navy Sea Service Deployment Ribbon w/20 stars
Navy Reserve Sea Service Ribbon w/3 stars	Coast Guard Special Operations Service Ribbon w/1 star	NATO Service (Iraq-Afghanistan-Sudan)
