= Maumee-class oiler =

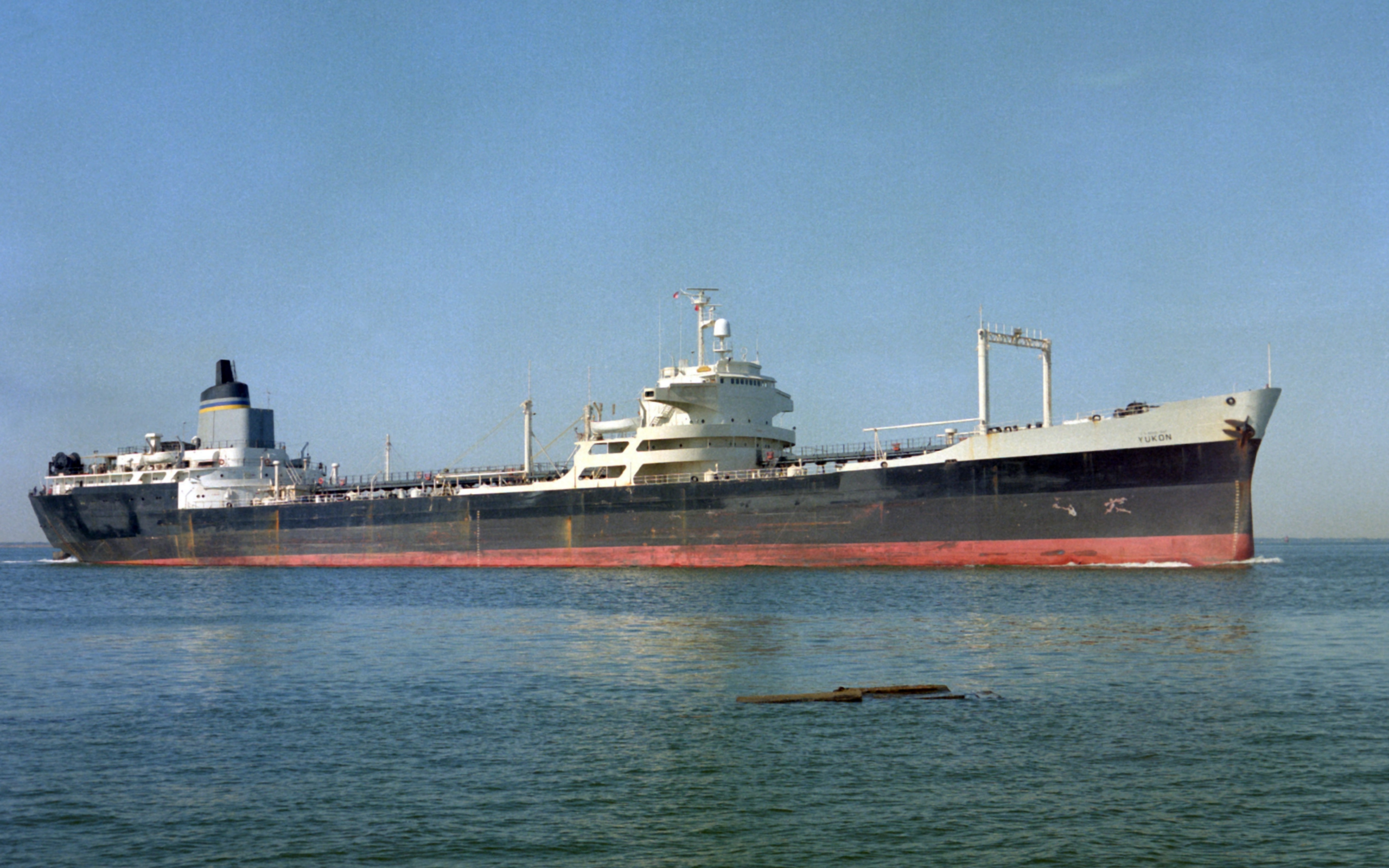
- USNS Yukon in 1985

Class overview
- Name: Maumee
- Builders: Sun Shipbuilding and Drydock Company; Ingalls Shipbuilding Corporation
- Operators: United States Navy
- Preceded by: Neosho class
- Succeeded by: American Explorer class
- Built: 1955-1957
- In service: 1956-1980s
- Planned: 4
- Building: 0
- Completed: 4
- Lost: 1
- Retired: 3

General characteristics
- Type: Fleet oiler
- Displacement: 7,814 tons light; 32,950 tons full load
- Length: 614 ft 6 in (187.30 m)
- Beam: 83 ft 6 in (25.45 m)
- Draft: 32 ft (9.8 m) maximum
- Propulsion: Steam turbine, one shaft
- Speed: 18.9 knots (35.0 km/h)
- Capacity: 190,000 barrels (30,000 m^{3})
- Complement: 44 to 52
- Armament: none

The Maumee class was a class of four United States Navy fleet oilers in service from the mid-1950s until the mid-1980s. It was the first class of United States Naval Ships.

The Maumee class ships were the first of the Navy's new "supertankers", significantly larger than previously classes. They also were the first U.S. Navy ships specifically designed and launched with an intention that they be operated in a non-commissioned status by the Military Sea Transportation Service, later the Military Sealift Command, with civilian crews working under contract. They thus became the first United States Naval Ships, and the first to be given the designation "USNS" instead of "USS" (for United States Ship, the long-standing designation for ships in commission and crewed by Navy personnel). The "T" appended to the beginning of their hull numbers indicated civilian manning, a convention still in use today. When the lead unit, USNS Maumee (T-AO-149), entered service in December 1956, she was the first USNS ship in history.

The ships were not designed for underway replenishment (refueling ships at sea). Rather they were intended to transport bulk petroleum products, such as fuel oil, gasoline, and aviation fuel, to American military forces overseas. At some time after the loss of USNS Potomac (T-AO-150) in 1961, the three survivors were reclassified as transport oilers, and were redesignated as such by having an additional "T" appended to their hull code.

== Naming ==
The class was named for its lead unit, Maumee. All four ships were named after American rivers with Native American names, a traditional convention for U.S. Navy oilers.

== Operations ==
The ships spent their careers in non-commissioned service in the Military Sea Transport Service, later the Military Sealift Command, operating with civilian crews, from the mid-1950s. After the loss of Potomac, the survivors served until probably the mid-1980s.

== Ships ==
=== USNS Maumee (T-AO-149) ===
Maumee transported petroleum primarily in the Pacific, operating in this role between mid-December 1956 and probably the mid-1980s. She eventually was reclassified as a "transport oiler" and redesignated T-AOT-149.

=== USNS Potomac (T-AO-150) ===
Potomac transported petroleum from 1957 until 1961, when she was destroyed pierside by a fire and explosions. Although her forward half was a total loss, her after half was salvaged and used in the construction of fleet oiler USNS Potomac (T-AO-181).

=== USNS Shoshone (T-AO-151) ===
Shoshone transported petroleum worldwide between mid-December 1956 and probably the late 1980s. Eventually reclassified as a "transport oiler" and redesignated T-AOT-151.

=== USNS Yukon (T-AO-152) ===
Yukon transported petroleum worldwide between mid-December 1956 and probably the late 1980s. Eventually reclassified as a "transport oiler" and redesignated T-AOT-152.
