= Potomac =

Potomac (/pəˈtoʊmək/) may refer to:

== Places in the United States ==
Washington, D.C. area:

- The Potomac River, which flows through West Virginia, Maryland, Virginia, and Washington, D.C.
  - The Potomac Highlands, a region of the Potomac River's watershed in West Virginia
  - Patowmack Canal, also spelled Potomac, a series of five inoperative canals in Maryland and Virginia
- Potomac, Maryland, an unincorporated area in Montgomery County
- Potomac Airfield, a general aviation airport in Fort Washington, Maryland
- Potomac Park, Maryland, in Allegany County
- Potomac, Virginia, an extinct town formerly located in Arlington County

Other places in the U.S.:

- Potomac, Illinois, a village in Vermilion County
- Potomac, Montana, an unincorporated community in Missoula County
- Potomac, West Virginia, an unincorporated community

== Companies ==
- Potomac Company, a former infrastructure company
- Epic Games, originally called Potomac Computer Systems, and American video game and software developer

== Transportation ==
=== Trains ===
- Potomac, a series of several former Amtrak passenger trains:
  - Potomac (Amtrak train)
  - Potomac Special
  - Potomac Turbo

=== Vessels ===
- USS Potomac, one of six ships
- Potomac (tug), a Patapsco Class tug built for Vane Brothers Company

== Other uses ==
- Patawomeck (or Potomac), a Native American tribe for whom the Potomac River was named
- Army of the Potomac, a major Union army during the American Civil War
- 1345 Potomac, an asteroid
- Potomac Horse Fever, a disease in horses
- Potomac Lake, an artificial lake in Gunnersbury Park, London
- University of the Potomac, a degree-granting college based in Washington, D.C.
- Potomak, a German record label
