= Wappocomo =

Wappocomo may refer to:

- Wappocomo — also spelled Wapocoma, Wapocomo, and Wappatomaka — a Native American term for the South Branch Potomac River, West Virginia, USA
  - Wappocomo, West Virginia, an unincorporated community in Hampshire County, West Virginia
  - Wappocomo (Romney, West Virginia), a 1774 plantation north of Romney, Hampshire County, West Virginia

== See also ==
- Potomac (disambiguation)
