= USS Tambor =

Submarine of the United States

Coordinates: 17°30′N 110°55′E

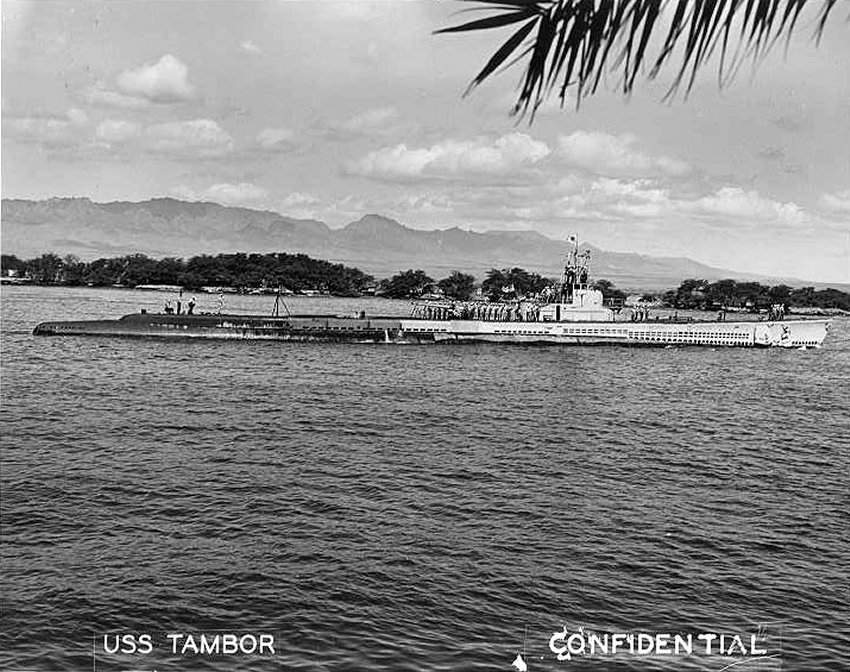
- USS Tambor (SS-198) off Diamond Head, Hawaii, circa 1943.

History

United States
- Name: USS Tambor
- Builder: Electric Boat Company, Groton, Connecticut
- Laid down: 16 January 1939
- Launched: 20 December 1939
- Commissioned: 3 June 1940
- Decommissioned: 10 December 1945
- Stricken: 1 September 1959
- Fate: Sold for scrap, 5 December 1959 however Periscope is preserved.

General characteristics
- Class & type: Tambor-class diesel-electric submarine
- Displacement: 1,475 long tons (1,499 t) standard, surfaced; 2,370 long tons (2,410 t) submerged
- Length: 307 ft 2 in (93.62 m)
- Beam: 27 ft 3 in (8.31 m)
- Draft: 14 ft 7 1/2 in (4.458 m)
- Propulsion: 4 × General Motors Model 16-248 V16 Diesel engines driving electric generators; 2 × 126-cell Sargo batteries; 4 × high-speed General Electric electric motors with reduction gears; two propellers; 5,400 shp (4.0 MW) surfaced; 2,740 shp (2.0 MW) submerged
- Speed: 20.4 knots (38 km/h) surfaced; 8.75 knots (16 km/h) submerged
- Range: 11,000 nautical miles (20,000 km) at 10 knots (19 km/h)
- Endurance: 48 hours at 2 knots (3.7 km/h) submerged
- Test depth: 250 ft (76 m)
- Complement: 6 officers, 54 enlisted
- Armament: 10 × 21-inch (533 mm) torpedo tubes; 6 forward, 4 aft; 24 torpedoes; 1 × 3-inch (76 mm) / 50 caliber deck gun; Bofors 40 mm and Oerlikon 20 mm cannon

USS Tambor (SS-198), the lead ship of her class of submarine, was the only ship of the United States Navy to be named for the tambor.

== Construction and commissioning ==
Tambor′s keel was laid down on 16 January 1939 by the Electric Boat Company in Groton, Connecticut. She was launched on 20 December 1939, sponsored by Miss Lucia Ellis, and commissioned on 3 June 1940 with Lieutenant commander John W. Murphy Jr. in command.

== Service history ==
=== 1940-1941 ===
After fitting out at New London, Tambor got underway on 6 August 1940 for her shakedown cruise which took her to New York City, Washington, D.C., Morehead City, North Carolina, and Houston, Texas. Following further training off Colón, Panama, the submarine returned to New London, Connecticut, before holding her acceptance trials and undergoing a post-shakedown overhaul at the Portsmouth Navy Yard in Kittery, Maine. After conducting live-fire trials on the effectiveness of depth charges, the first of their kind in the U.S. Navy, Tambor reported in May 1941 to the Submarine Force, Pacific Fleet, and the command of Rear Admiral Thomas Withers (COMSUBPAC). Tambor began a routine peacetime patrol in late November 1941.

=== World War II ===
==== December 1941–March 1942 ====
Tambor was off Wake Island when hostilities with Japan broke out with the Japanese attack on Pearl Harbor. She was forced to return to Pearl Harbor with one diesel engine out of commission. Routed back to Mare Island Navy Yard at Mare Island, California, where the damage was repaired, she returned to Pearl Harbor in March 1942.

==== First war patrol ====
Tambor began her first war patrol on 15 March 1942 when she stood out of Pearl Harbor to reconnoiter the areas around Wake Island, Truk, New Ireland, New Britain, and Rabaul. In all, she made nine attacks; on 16 April, she fired two torpedoes at tanker Kitami Maru. One hit, and she was credited with a sinking; this was not verified by postwar examination of Japanese records. Tambor returned to Pearl Harbor on 12 May, where her skipper criticized the torpedoes.

==== Second war patrol ====
After refitting, she was then assigned to Task Group 7.1. The group of six submarines sailed for Midway Island on 21 May 1942 to begin patrolling a 150 miles (240 km) circle in anticipation of the invasion fleet intelligence had reported was en route there. At 07:15 on 4 June 90 minutes after first reported contact, COMSUBPAC, Admiral Robert H. English, informed his submarines, waiting until after 11:00 to order them to close. Running surfaced, Tambor was strafed by aircraft

At 02:15 on 5 June, Tambor radioed sighting "four large ships" 90 nmi (100 mi; 170 km) north of Midway, at a range of 3 nmi (3.5 mi; 5.6 km). The ships were far enough away to make identification difficult, and the subs on patrol had been warned that "friendlies" might be on patrol in that area. Murphy changed course to keep contact until he could be sure of their identity.

Shortly after this sighting, Yamamoto ordered the cruisers to turn north, away from their original course for Midway. Tambor soon sighted them again, at 0238. The sub was now in front of the Japanese ships, which changed heading again, to the northwest. At 0258, Murphy turned due west, hoping to put them between him and the moon so their silhouettes would make them easier to identify. After losing and regaining sight of the cruisers in the dark, Murphy made an educated guess, turning left again, and re-sighted the ships.

At 0400, with the approach of dawn and improving visibility, the general shape of the ships became clear, but it was still not possible to see enough detail to determine exactly whose ships they were. At 0412, Murphy ordered the signalman to use the signal light to send an ID signal. When the response was unintelligible, the sub crash-dived. When there was no attack, the sub was brought to periscope depth, where damage to the cruiser Mogami's bow was easily visible.

When Tambor had sailed across in front of the line of cruisers in an effort to see them more clearly, the lead ship had sighted the sub and ordered a change of course. Mogami had turned a bit late and had collided with Mikuma, sailing just in front of her, and 40 feet of her bow was compressed and pushed nearly perpendicular to the rest of the ship. The next day, based on Tambor's report, and following the oil slick, dive bombers found the two damaged cruisers and their destroyer escorts and were able to sink Mikuma—the largest Japanese non-carrier sunk to that point in the war. This proved to be Tambor's best (and among her only) contribution to the battle.

The captain ordered the sub to pursue the cruisers. Since surface pursuit would have been suicide, as the cruisers could have easily destroyed Tambor with their guns, the sub was forced to submerge. Since best speed while submerged was only nine knots, and the cruisers were estimated as making seventeen knots, they were soon lost. Tambor played no further role in the battle.

On 7 June, responding to a radar contact, Tambor dived. An exploding bomb damaged both her periscopes and cracked all four battery blower motors. The bomb probably came from an American B-17; a similar incident had happened the day before, when another B-17 had bombed the submarine USS Grayling, mistaking it for a Japanese cruiser. Tambor returned to Pearl Harbor on 16 June for repairs.

Along with several other sub skippers, Lt.Cdr. Murphy was promptly relieved of command, for timidity in the face of the enemy in light of Tambor's failure to close with and attack the enemy, or at least identify and properly shadow the Japanese cruiser force so aircraft could be vectored to the location (a regular task for both Japanese and American submarines and the primary purpose for which Tambor was there at all). Lt.Cdr. Murphy's lack of aggressiveness had hampered Spruance's intelligence of the battle and had played an important role in allowing Suzuya, Kumano and Mogami to escape almost certain destruction from air attack. Murphy was sent to a shore post, being replaced in command of Tambor by Lt.Cdr. Steven H. Armbruster.

==== Third war patrol ====
Her next patrol (now in the hands of Stephen H. Ambruster) began on 24 July 1942 at Pearl Harbor, ending on 19 September at Fremantle, Australia. Tambor searched for enemy shipping in the Marshall Islands. On 7 August near Wotje Atoll, she sank the converted net tender Shofaka with one torpedo which broke her in half. Tambor remained in the Marshalls until 19 August when she was ordered to patrol the southern passages to Truk. As there was time to spare before she was to take station there, she prowled through the Caroline Islands. On 21 August near Ponape, the submarine fired a spread of three torpedoes at a freighter and her escort. The first hit the target amidships and the other two aft, blowing off the stern. Shinsei Maru No. Six quickly sank. On 1 September, she fired four torpedoes at a tanker off Truk and damaged it with one hit. She was credited with two ships for 12,000 tons; this was reduced to 5,800 tons postwar.

==== Fourth war patrol ====
Tambor sailed for Hainan Strait on 12 October 1942 and (in part due to torpedo shortages) laid mines. On 3 November, she fired three torpedoes at a freighter, but all missed. The submarine eluded detection and, 30 minutes later, fired two more. One hit amidships, and Chikugo Maru went under by the stern. On 6 November, she fired two torpedoes at a cargo-passenger ship flying the French flag, but both missed. On 10 November, she closed on an unarmed sampan, took its crew on board and sank it by gunfire. Credited with one ship for 10,000 tons (reduced to 2,500 tons postwar), Tambor returned to Fremantle on 21 November for refit, during which her deck gun was replaced by a five-inch (127 mm)/25cal gun.

==== Fifth war patrol ====
From 18 December 1942 to 28 January 1943, Tambor patrolled Sunda Strait between Krakatau and Thartway Island. The only target sighted was an enemy destroyer which she attacked on 1 January 1943. The submarine's spread of four torpedoes missed, and she went deep to avoid the 18 depth charges that followed. On 29 December 1942, Fukken Maru was sunk by a mine laid by Tambor.

==== Sixth war patrol ====
Tambor sailed from Fremantle on 18 February 1943 to carry out a special mission in the Philippine Islands, in support of "MacArthur's Guerrillas". On 5 March, she landed a small party headed by Lt.Cdr. Charles Parsons with 50,000 rounds of .30 (7.62 mm) ammunition, 20,000 rounds of .45 ACP (11.4 mm) ammunition, and $10,000 in currency on southern Mindanao. On 22 March, she fired three torpedoes at a tanker southwest of Apo Island. {This was the Bugen Maru, which was damaged} Seven days later, she scored one hit on a freighter out of three torpedoes fired and believed it sank; it was not confirmed. The submarine returned to Fremantle on 14 April for refit in which a 20-millimeter gun was installed forward of the bridge.

==== Seventh war patrol ====
Tambor's seventh patrol (now under Russell Kefauver) took her north of the Malay Barrier from 7 May to 27 June 1943. On 26 May, she fired a spread of three torpedoes at a tanker that all missed. Three days later, three more missed a cargo ship. She tried again several hours later, saw two of the three torpedoes fired score hits, and heard three explosions. As the target was sinking, she fired another spread of three at an accompanying freighter. Some of the crew of Eiski Maru escaped in two lifeboats. On 2 June and on 6 June, she fired spreads of three torpedoes at cargo ships. The first appeared to break in half, and the second seemed to sink; there is no record of the sinkings in Japanese official records. {Eika Maru was sunk 2 June.} On 16 June, Tambor fired her last three torpedoes at a tanker off Cam Ranh Bay but all missed. Her score for the patrol postwar was one ship of 2,500 tons.

==== Eighth war patrol ====
Tambor stood out of Fremantle for the last time on 20 July 1943 en route to Lombok Strait. On 27 July the Teiken Maru was sunk by a mine laid by the Tambor On 3 August, she sighted five cargomen and a destroyer in Palawan Passage. Three shots at a freighter produced two hits, and one fired at another target missed; Japanese records do not indicate any sinking. On 21 August, she sighted an unescorted convoy of three tankers and five freighters. She fired five torpedoes at a pair of freighters, but scored no hits. Two more sped toward a tanker and produced one explosion but no apparent damage. The next day, she sighted another convoy heading in the opposite direction. Making a submerged attack, Tambor fired five torpedoes at a large freighter. Three made perfect hits amidships but all failed to explode, and she sank no ships. The submarine set sail for Midway, arriving 7 September. She transited through Pearl Harbor on her way to San Francisco, on 20 November for major overhaul.

==== Ninth war patrol ====
Tambor returned to Pearl Harbor on 15 December 1943 and held refresher training during the remainder of the month. She began her ninth war patrol on 5 January 1944. Her assigned area was in the East China Sea. She sighted a Natori-class cruiser on 22 January, but lost contact in a rain squall. Six days later, she contacted a convoy of nine ships heading north and tracked it until 01:56 the next day. She then fired two torpedoes at a cargo ship in a surface attack. Both hit and sent Shuntai Maru down by the bow. An escort headed straight for the submarine and ramming seemed inevitable. Tambor opened fire with her aft 20-millimeter gun and turned hard to port causing the escort to pass 20 yards (20 m) astern. After evading the escort, the submarine tried to regain contact with the convoy but failed.

On 2 February, she began tracking two ships. The following morning, she fired two torpedoes at a cargo ship, and both hit amidships. She directed two more at a tanker, and one hit forward of the target's stack. Both Ariake Maru and Goyo Maru sank. Tambor went deep and remained on the bottom under depth charge attack from 04:18 to 13:15. Ten days later, she encountered another three-ship convoy. In a night surface attack, the submarine fired a spread of three torpedoes at a cargo ship. As Tambor submerged, her crew heard one hit and sank the passenger-cargo ship Ronsan Maru. Her patrol was a success, with four ships confirmed sunk, a total of 18,400 tons.

==== Tenth war patrol ====
After refit at Pearl Harbor, Tambor put to sea on 9 April 1944 en route to the Mariana Islands. On 18 April, she attacked a 250-ton trawler loaded with food and fresh vegetables. A boarding party from the submarine killed seven members of the Japanese vessel's crew and captured the second officer. The Americans removed the ship's papers and left her afire and sinking. {This was the gunboat "Shinku Maru No. 3"} On 10 May, she contacted an eight-ship convoy, escorted by five destroyers and two destroyer escorts. In a submerged attack, Tambor fired four torpedoes at a cargo ship and heard two explosions, then went deep, taking 50 depth charges from the escorts. Tambor surfaced later and attempted to close the convoy once more. However, a destroyer picked her up and subjected her to another depth charge attack.{The sunk ship was the "Keiyo Maru"} On 26 May she scored two hits which sank Chigo Maru (650 tons). Tambor's tenth patrol ended at Midway on 2 June.

==== Eleventh war patrol ====
The submarine (now in the hands of William J. Germershausen) conducted her next patrol in the waters off southern Hokkaidō and the Kuril Islands from 16 July to 23 August 1944. She fired three torpedoes at a freighter on 28 July and heard three explosions. However, a dense fog prohibited her seeing the results. {possibly the escort Kunashiri reported to have been damaged by "unknown cause"} On 13 August, Tambor made a surface attack against a cargo ship and then photographed Toei Maru (2,300 tons) as she lowered two lifeboats and sank in 20 minutes. After returning to Midway, Tambor continued to Pearl Harbor for refit.

==== Twelfth war patrol ====
Tambor returned to Midway on 6 October 1944, and sailed the next day for the Tokyo Bay area. On 15 October, she fired four torpedoes at three radar pips and heard one explosion. She was forced to go deep to evade 26 depth charges. She emerged with no damage. Four days later, she attacked an escort with four torpedoes and heard four explosions, but no sinking was verified. The submarine returned to Saipan from 8 to 10 November, then resumed her patrol, now one of six members of the wolfpack "Burt's Brooms" (named for Thomas B. Klakring, commanding SubDiv 101).

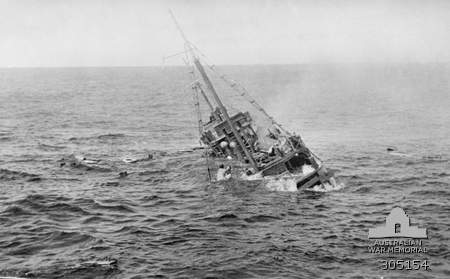
IJN Guardship "Takashiro Maru" sunk 16 November 1944

Shortly before midnight on 15 November, Tambor fired three torpedoes at a patrol boat, but scored no hits. Forty-five minutes later, three more missed. At 06:10, the submarine's commander decided to battle on the surface with his deck guns; the escort fired back, and a Tambor crewmen was severely wounded. Thirty minutes later, as the target began to sink, Tambor's crew took two prisoners from the water. She transferred them and the wounded crewman to Grayson (DD-435) on 18 November. {The sunken vessel was the guardship "Takashiro Maru"}Tambor ended her last war patrol at Pearl Harbor on 30 November 1944, to be retired from combat.

Routed onward to the United States, Tambor arrived at San Francisco on 10 December 1944. After an extended overhaul, the submarine sailed for Puget Sound on 9 March 1945. Upon her arrival, Tambor began training operations with Navy patrol aircraft under Fleet Air Wing 6. World War II ended with the cessation of hostilities with Japan on 15 August 1945 (14 August on the other side of the International Date Line in Hawaii).

=== Post-World War II ===
On 17 September 1945, Tambor departed the United States West Coast for Portsmouth Naval Shipyard. She was decommissioned there on 10 December 1945 and placed in reserve.

In April 1947, Tambor was assigned to the Ninth Naval District to train United States Naval Reserve personnel, and reported to the Naval Reserve Training Center, Detroit, Michigan, on 8 December 1947. Tambor remained on this station until 1959.

Tambor was drydocked at Toledo, Ohio, on 2 October 1953, the first-ever drydocking of a submarine on the Great Lakes. The shipyard had to remove her deck guns to get her light enough to fit on the blocks. She spent five weeks in drydock for a routine overhaul, being covered in 7,000 pounds (3,175 kg) of paint, including six coats on her anchor chain.

== Disposal ==
In 1959 a Board of Inspection and Survey found Tambor unfit for further naval service. She was stricken from the Naval Vessel Register on 1 September 1959 and subsequently sold for scrap. A periscope from the sub is on display at Detroit’s Dossin Great Lakes Museum.

== Honors and awards ==
- Asiatic-Pacific Campaign Medal with 11 battle stars for World War II service
