= USNS Yukon (T-AO-152) =

Oiler of the United States Navy

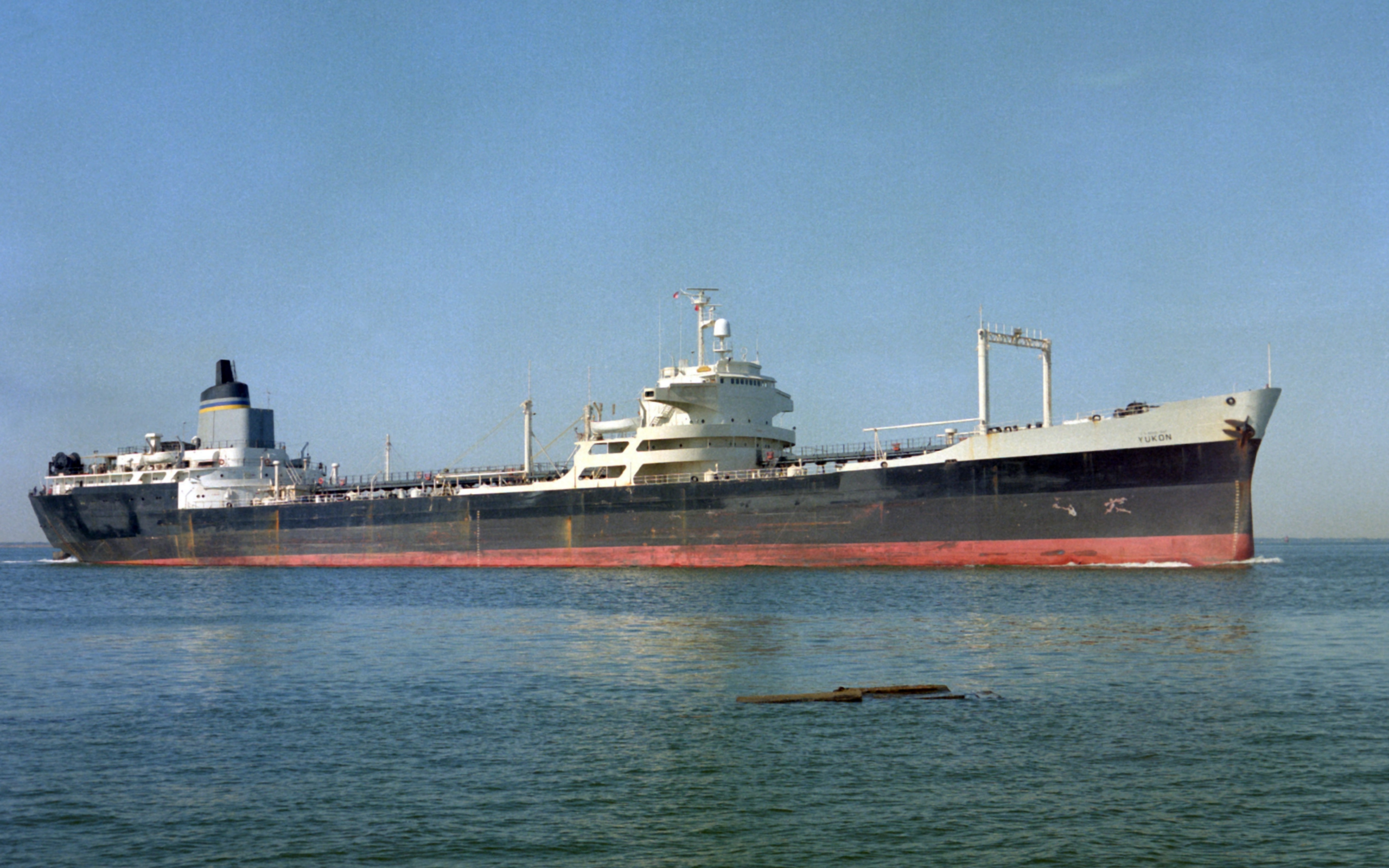
- USNS Yukon (T-AOT-152)

History

United States
- Name: USNS Yukon
- Namesake: The Yukon River in Alaska
- Builder: Ingalls Shipbuilding Corporation, Pascagoula, Mississippi
- Laid down: 16 May 1955
- Launched: 16 March 1956
- In service: May 1957 – 20 October 1985
- Out of service: 20 October 1985 – 13 April 1992
- Stricken: 13 April 1992
- Identification: IMO number: 7737200
- Fate: Sold for scrapping 18 September 1995

General characteristics
- Class & type: Maumee-class fleet oiler
- Displacement: 7,814 tons light; 32,953 tons full load
- Length: 614 ft 6 in (187.30 m)
- Beam: 83 ft 6 in (25.45 m)
- Draft: 32 ft (9.8 m)
- Propulsion: Steam turbine, one shaft
- Speed: 18.9 knots (35 km/h)
- Capacity: 190,000 barrels (30,000 m^{3})
- Complement: 44 to 52
- Notes: Later reclassified as a transport oiler and redesignated T-AO-152T

USNS Yukon (T-AO-152), later T-AOT-152, was a United States Navy Maumee-class oiler, later transport oiler, in non-commissioned service with the Military Sea Transportation Service, later Military Sealift Command, from 1957 to 1985.

Yukon, second U.S. Navy ship to bear the name, was laid down at Ingalls Shipbuilding Corporation at Pascagoula, Mississippi, on 16 May 1955 and launched on 16 March 1956, sponsored by Mrs. John P. Womble, Jr.. She entered non-commissioned U.S. Navy service under the control of the Military Sea Transport Service, later the Military Sealift Command, with a primarily civilian crew in May 1957.

Yukon carried petroleum products from United States Gulf Coast ports and such oil-producing areas as Venezuela and the Persian Gulf to American military bases throughout the world, taking her into every ocean and many seas. She eventually was reclassified as a "transport oiler", resulting her redesignation from "T-AO-152" (as an oiler) to "T-AOT-152" (as a transport oiler).

Yukon was placed out of service and laid up as part of the Navy's Ready Reserve Force (RRF) on 20 October 1985. She was struck from the Naval Vessel Register on 13 April 1992 and transferred to the Maritime Administration (MARAD) for lay up in the National Defense Reserve Fleet. She was sold for scrapping on 18 September 1995 by the Defense Reutilization and Marketing Service (DRMS).
