= USNS Maumee =

Oiler of the United States Navy

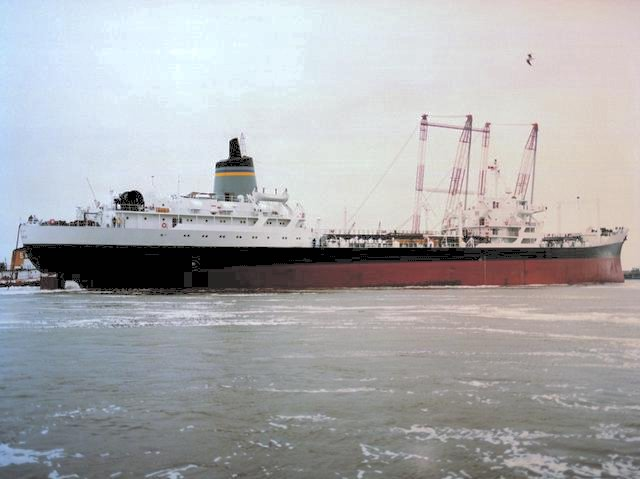
- USNS Maumee (T-AO-149)

History

United States
- Name: USNS Maumee
- Namesake: The Maumee River in Ohio and Indiana
- Builder: Sun Shipbuilding and Drydock Company, Chester, Pennsylvania
- Laid down: 8 March 1955
- Launched: 15 November 1955
- In service: 17 December 1956 until probably mid-1980s
- Out of service: Probably mid-1980s until 23 December 1994
- Stricken: Unknown date; title transferred to Maritime Administration 23 December 1994
- Identification: IMO number: 7737183
- Fate: Sold for scrapping 9 November 2006
- Notes: The first ship launched as a United States Naval Ship

General characteristics
- Class & type: Maumee-class fleet oiler
- Displacement: 7,814 tons light; 32,953 tons full load
- Length: 614 ft 6 in (187.30 m)
- Beam: 83 ft 6 in (25.45 m)
- Draft: 32 ft (9.8 m)
- Propulsion: Steam turbine, one shaft
- Speed: 18.9 knots (35 km/h)
- Capacity: 190,000 barrels (30,000 m^{3})
- Complement: 44 to 52
- Armament: none
- Notes: Later reclassified as a transport oiler and redesignated T-AO-149T

USNS Maumee (T-AO-149), later T-AOT-149, was a United States Navy Maumee-class oiler, later transport oiler, in non-commissioned service with the Military Sea Transportation Service (MSTS), later Military Sealift Command, from 1956 until probably the mid-1980s.

Maumee, the fourth U.S. Navy ship to bear the name, was laid down at Sun Shipbuilding and Drydock Company at Chester, Pennsylvania, on 18 March 1955 and launched on 15 November 1955, sponsored by Mrs. Lloyd Harrison. She entered non-commissioned U.S. Navy service under the control of the Military Sea Transportation Service, later the Military Sealift Command, with a primarily civilian crew on 17 December 1956.

Maumee was the lead unit of her new "supertanker" class and the first vessel in naval history to be launched as a United States Naval Ship (USNS), intended for non-commissioned U.S. Navy service with a civilian crew. Built along commercial tanker lines specifically for MSTS duty, Maumee, following her completion, was turned over to Marine Transport Lines to operate for MSTS as a civilian-crewed ship under a long‑term consecutive‑voyage charter. By 1958 she had begun her first prolonged duty in the Pacific. Her role was point‑to‑point delivery of bulk petroleum in support of the U.S. armed forces in the Pacific area.

From 1968 to 1971, the ship was also used in the Navy's Operation Deep Freeze II, where it was used to transport fuel supplies to McMurdo Sound (South Pole). It was the largest ship to visit Antarctica, and was led into the ice pack by ice breakers. She eventually was reclassified as a "transport oiler", resulting her redesignation from "T-AO-149" (as an oiler) to "T-AOT-149" (as a transport oiler).

Maumee was placed out of service at an unrecorded date, probably in the mid-1980s. She was struck from the Naval Vessel Register, also at an unrecorded date, and was transferred to the Maritime Administration on 23 December 1994 to be laid up in the National Defense Reserve Fleet at Beaumont, Texas. She was sold for scrapping on 9 November 2006 to ESCO Marine of Brownsville, Texas. and departed the National Defense Reserve Fleet, Beaumont Group, on 23 January 2007 for scrapping by ESCO Marine.

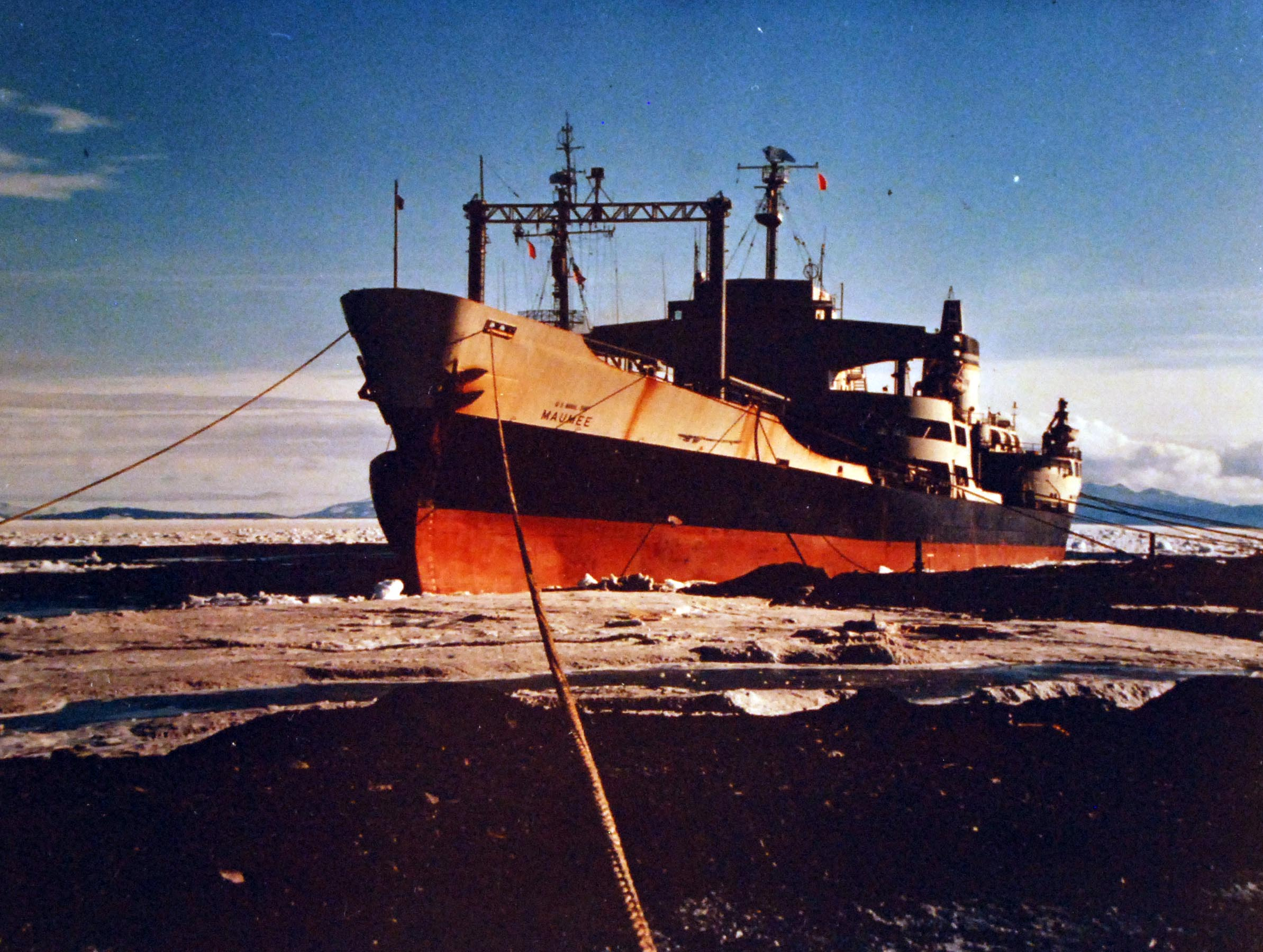
USNS Maumee at McMurdo Station's ice pier, January 1974
