= USNS Shoshone =

Oiler of the United States Navy

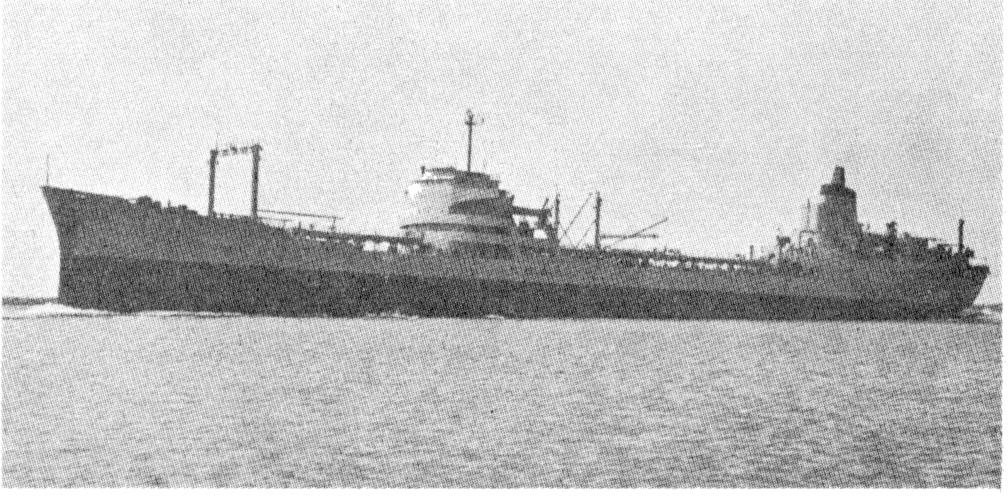
- USNS Shoshone (T-AO-151)

History

United States
- Name: USNS Shoshone
- Namesake: The Shoshone River in Wyoming
- Builder: Sun Shipbuilding and Drydock Company, Chester, Pennsylvania
- Laid down: 15 August 1955
- Launched: 17 January 1957
- In service: April 1957 until probably mid-1980s
- Out of service: Probably mid-1980s until 23 December 1994
- Stricken: Date unknown; transferred to Maritime Administration 1 October 1994 for lay-up in National Defense Reserve Fleet
- Reinstated: 11 May 2002 (reacquired for further transfer to the Office of Naval Research); fate unknown
- Identification: IMO number: 7737195
- Fate: Scrapped 2014

General characteristics
- Class & type: Maumee-class fleet oiler
- Displacement: 7,814 tons light; 32,953 tons full load
- Length: 614 ft 6 in (187.30 m)
- Beam: 83 ft 6 in (25.45 m)
- Draft: 32 ft (9.8 m)
- Propulsion: Steam turbine, one shaft
- Speed: 18.9 knots (35 km/h)
- Capacity: 190,000 barrels (30,000 m^{3})
- Complement: 44 to 52
- Armament: none
- Notes: Later reclassified as a transport oiler and redesignated T-AO-151T

USNS Shoshone (T-AO-151), later T-AO-151T, was a United States Navy Maumee-class oiler, later transport oiler, in non-commissioned service with the Military Sea Transportation Service (MSTS), later Military Sealift Command, from 1957 until probably the mid-1980s.

Shoshone, third U.S. Navy ship to bear the name, was laid down at Sun Shipbuilding and Drydock Company at Chester, Pennsylvania, on 15 August 1955 and launched on 17 January 1957, sponsored by Mrs. James E. Van Zandt. She entered non-commissioned U.S. Navy service under the control of the Military Sea Transport Service, later the Military Sealift Command, with a primarily civilian crew in April 1957.

Shoshone went into operation for MSTS as a civilian-crewed ship. Her role was point‑to‑point delivery of fuel oil and gasoline to the U.S. armed forces at a variety of Atlantic and Pacific ports. She eventually was reclassified as a "transport oiler", resulting her redesignation from "T-AO-151" (as an oiler) to "T-AO-151T" (as a transport oiler). By 1974 she was operating from United States Gulf Coast ports.

Shoshone was placed out of service at an unrecorded date, probably in the mid-1980s. She was struck from the Naval Vessel Register, also at an unrecorded date, and was transferred to the Maritime Administration on 1 October 1994 to be laid up in the National Defense Reserve Fleet at Suisun Bay at Benicia, California.

In 2001 she was used as an experimental platform by MH Systems to demonstrate the American Underpressure System (AUPS); a pressurized gas system intended to stop or significantly decrease the amount of oil spillage from single and double-hulled tankers in the event of a hull rupture. Following the test, the Shoshone was returned to the Reserve Fleet in August 2001. Google Earth images from August 25, 2009 still show the Shoshone as being part of the Suisun Bay National Defense Reserve Fleet. (38°3′52″N 122°6′18″W)

She was scrapped in 2014.
