= USNS American Explorer =

1959 nuclear-powered tanker

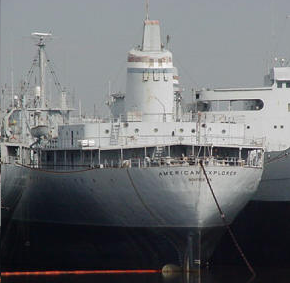
- American Explorer

History

United States
- Builder: Ingalls Shipbuilding, Pascagoula, MS
- Laid down: 9 July 1957
- Launched: 11 April 1958
- Completed: 27 October 1959
- Home port: Beaumont, Texas
- Identification: IMO number: 7737171
- Nickname(s): Hull# 469
- Fate: Scrapped

Class overview
- Preceded by: Maumee class
- Succeeded by: Sealift Pacific class

General characteristics
- Type: Type T5-S-RM2a Tanker
- Tonnage: 14,980 GT
- Length: 595 ft (181 m)
- Beam: 80 ft (24 m)
- Draft: 36.1 ft (11.0 m)
- Speed: 20 knots (37 km/h; 23 mph)
- Complement: 47

USNS American Explorer (T-AOT-165) was a tanker built for the United States Military Sea Transport Service. The tanker was built by Ingalls SB of Mississippi in 1958, and at the time her keel was laid, the vessel was intended to be the world's first nuclear-powered tanker, but was completed with a conventional steam power plant. The ship was transferred to the US Maritime Administration in 1984 and was part of the US Reserve Fleet, Beaumont Reserve Fleet, Texas. American Explorer was sold for scrap on 8 July 2008 to the Southern Scrap Metal Corporation in New Orleans, Louisiana. On 13 August, two weeks before Hurricane Gustav struck the Southeastern Louisiana coastline, the tanker was moved to New Orleans' Industrial Canal.

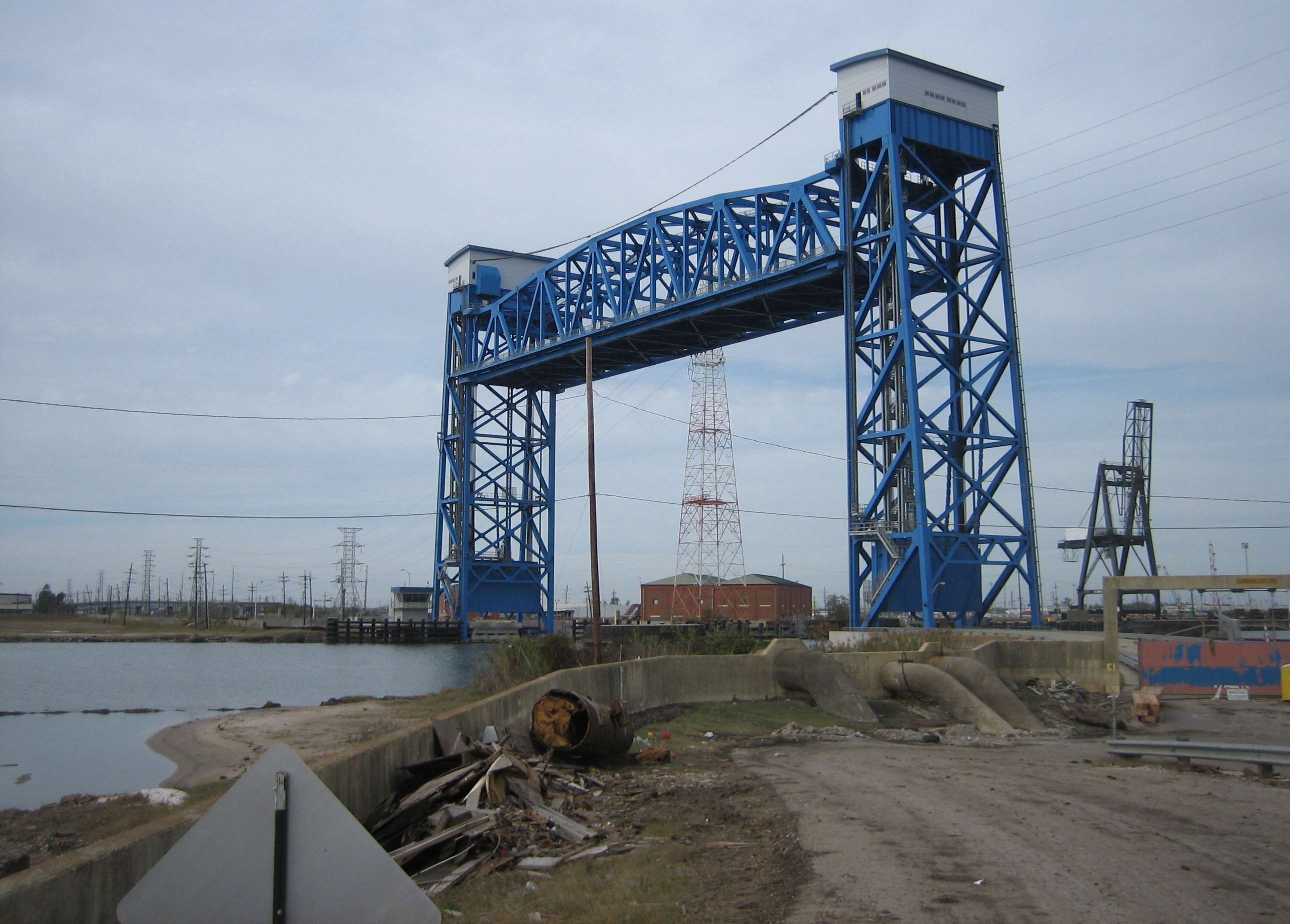
The Florida Avenue Bridge was struck and damaged by one of two military ships during Hurricane Gustav

== Adrift during Hurricane Gustav ==
During the night of 31 August/1 September 2008, as Hurricane Gustav approached the coast of Louisiana, two clusters (Export Courier) of ships were dislodged from their moorings and broke free. American Explorer was shown in video coverage to be one of two military vessels (along with the former US Navy submarine tender Hunley) that ran into the Florida Avenue Bridge. After hitting the bridge, the ships then ran into two concrete pile-barriers that protect pump station No. 19, which serves the 9th ward of New Orleans. A United States Coast Guard (USCG) tug eventually pinned the ships into position so that they would not move. Joel Dupree of Southern Scrap Metal Corporation claims the Corps of Engineers were testing docks on the Industrial canal which prevented moving the ships prior to Gustav entering the Mississippi River, and that the American Explorer was properly anchored during the storm. However, the level of the surge and winds were sufficient to break their moorings. The USCG, however, said that it had recommended that ships double-up mooring lines prior to the storm. Shortly after the peak of the storm, reporters for a local radio station went to the Florida Avenue bridge and reported the damage as being minor.

Another naval ship, the former US Navy cargo ship Courier, and two barges were involved in separate incidents at the Almonaster rail bridge and a nearby pump station. As a consequence of these events, all vessels to be removed from the Industrial Canal in advance of gale-force wind conditions, and Southern Scrap Metal Corporation was told to remove all floating vessels for the duration of the 2008 season. A US Coast Guard Investigation has been launched into the corporation's activities prior to Gustav.
