= USNS Courier =

American cargo ship

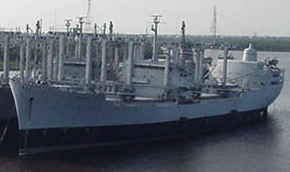
- Courier

History

United States
- Name: SS Export Courier
- Operator: American Export Lines (before 1983)
- Builder: Sun Shipbuilding and Drydock, Chester, Pennsylvania, U.S.
- Laid down: 7 July 1961
- Launched: 5 April 1962
- Acquired: 11 December 1962
- Renamed: Courier
- Reclassified: Military Sealift Command (1980?–2001)
- Home port: Beaumont, Texas, U.S.
- Identification: IMO number: 5111062
- Fate: Scrapped in 2008

General characteristics
- Class & type: Breakbulk Cargo Ship
- Type: C3-S-46b
- Tonnage: 11,420 gross
- Length: 470 ft (140 m)
- Beam: 73 ft (22 m)
- Draft: 30 ft 6 in (9.30 m) (max)
- Propulsion: steam turbine, single screw
- Speed: 18.5 kts
- Capacity: 11,000 tons, (663,069 cu. ft.)
- Complement: 39

USNS Courier (MARAD hull AK-5019) was a cargo ship of the National Defense Reserve Fleet. The cargo ship was built by Sun Shipbuilding and Drydock Company, Chester, Pennsylvania, at the request of the US Maritime Administration (MARAD hull 124) in 1962. The ship was 470 ft in length and has a breath of 73 and weighs 11420 tons, empty. The ship was originally administered by American Export Lines under the civilian name SS Export Courier and eventually became part of the James River Reserve Fleet. The company ran into financial trouble in 1977. Before 1981, Farrell Lines, which took over parts of the dissolved American Export Lines, transferred administration of the Courier to the Military Sealift Command, which renamed the ship USNS Courier. The ship was officially accepted as part of the Maritime Administration in February 1983. From 1981 it was stationed with the Beaumont Reserve Fleet or docked at Port Neches, Beaumont Texas. Service records indicate repairs after Operation Desert Storm. In 2001 the ship was transferred to the National Defense Reserve Fleet and remained in this status until July 2008 when it was sold to Southern Scrap Metal Corporation of New Orleans, Louisiana and subsequently transferred to New Orleans' Industrial Canal on 13 August, a little more than two weeks before Hurricane Gustav reached Louisiana's southeastern coast.

== History ==
=== Adrift and grounding during Gustav ===
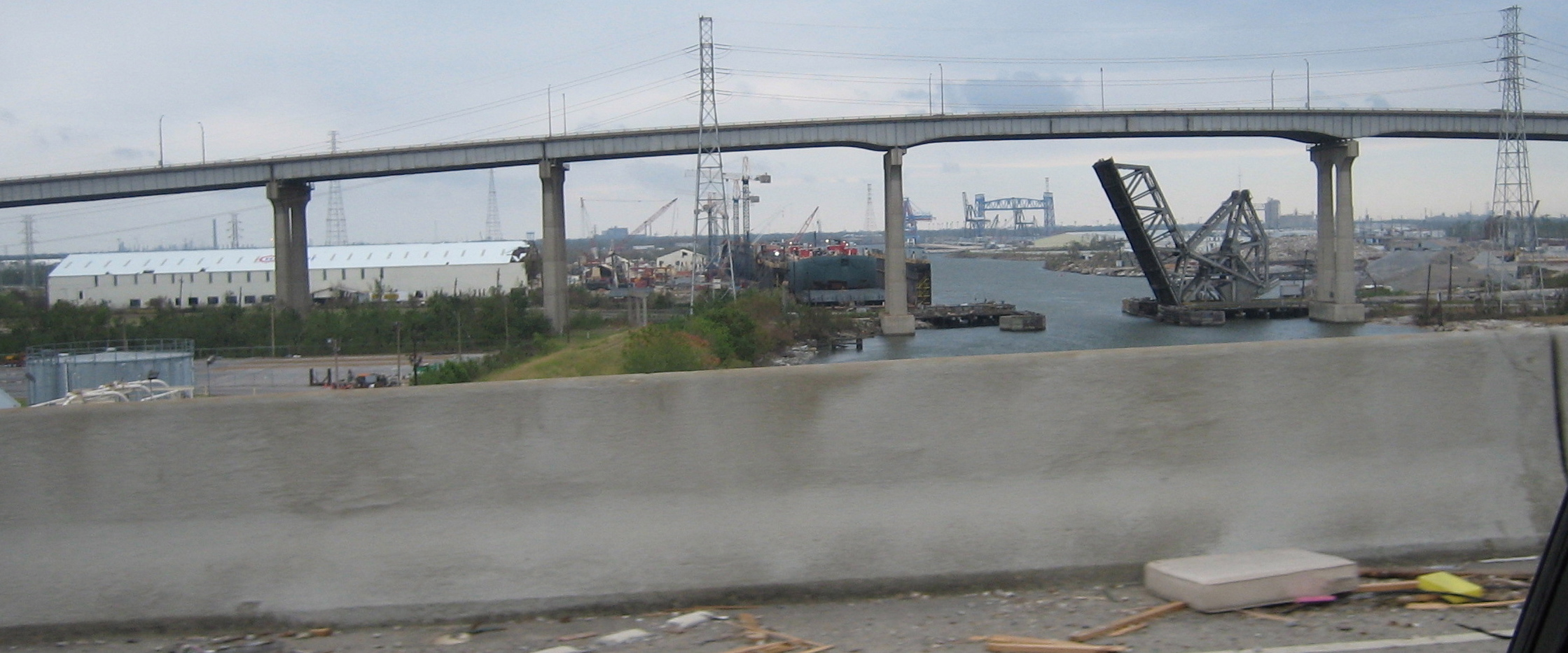
Almonaster (rail) bridge and I-10 High Rise Bridge, The Courier was lodged on the distal side of the bridge, left with 2 other barges

During the night of 31 August 2008 or early morning of 1 September 2008, as a weak category-3 hurricane Gustav approached the coast of Louisiana, at least two clusters of ships were dislodged from their moorings and broke free. The Courier was shown in video coverage to be one of three vessel grounded on an embankment approaching the L & N railroad bridge near the I-10 'high' bridge. On 3 September 2008, Joel Dupree of Southern Scrap Metal Corp. claimed the Courier has been removed from its position in front of the Almonaster Avenue Bridge and remoored at the scrap metal yard. Dupree claims the Corps of Engineers were testing locks on the Industrial Canal at the Mississippi river that prevented moving the ships prior to Gustav, and that the Courier was properly anchored during the storm, however the level of the surge and winds were sufficient to break their moorings. The USCG, however, said that it had recommended that ships double-up mooring lines prior to the storm.

In addition to the risk to the rail bridge, the two accompanying barges apparently hit and damaged a warehouse along the western side of the Industrial Canal near the bridge. Two other naval ships, the USNS American Explorer and USS Hunley were involved in separate incidents at the Florida Avenue Bridge and pump station. As a consequence of these events, all vessels to be removed from the Industrial Canal in advance of gale-force wind conditions, and Southern Scrap Metal Corporation was told to remove all floating vessels for the duration of the 2008 season.
