= USNS Potomac (T-AO-150) =

Oiler of the United States Navy

History

United States
- Name: USNS Potomac
- Namesake: The Potomac River in Maryland, Virginia, and Washington, D.C.
- Builder: Sun Shipbuilding and Drydock Company, Chester, Pennsylvania
- Laid down: 9 June 1955
- Launched: 8 October 1956
- In service: 30 January 1957-26 September 1961
- Identification: IMO number: 6504694
- Fate: Destroyed by fire 26 September 1961
- Notes: Stern of ship salvaged and used in construction of tanker SS Shenandoah, which later became fleet oiler USNS Potomac (T-AO-181)

General characteristics
- Class & type: Maumee-class fleet oiler
- Displacement: 7,814 tons light; 32,953 tons full load
- Length: 614 ft 6 in (187.30 m)
- Beam: 83 ft 6 in (25.45 m)
- Draft: 32 ft (9.8 m)
- Propulsion: Steam turbine, one shaft
- Speed: 18.9 knots (35 km/h)
- Capacity: 190,000 barrels (30,000 m^{3})
- Complement: 44 to 52
- Armament: none

USNS Potomac (T-AO-150) was a United States Navy Maumee-class oiler in non-commissioned service with the Military Sea Transportation Service, later Military Sealift Command, from 1957 to 1961.

Potomac, fifth U.S. Navy ship to bear the name, was laid down at Sun Shipbuilding and Drydock Company at Chester, Pennsylvania, on 9 June 1955 and launched on 8 October 1956, sponsored by Mrs. T. H. Robbins, Jr. She entered non-commissioned U.S. Navy service under the control of the Military Sea Transport Service (MSTS) with a primarily civilian crew on 30 January 1957.

Potomac carried fuel oil and aviation fuel to the United States armed forces overseas until 26 September 1961, when she was wracked by fire and a series of explosions while alongside the Aviation Fuels Terminal Pier at Morehead City, North Carolina. Two men were killed in the explosions, and the forward part of the ship was declared a total loss. A disastrous waterfront fire was avoided by the prompt heroic action of Potomac crew members, United States Coast Guard personnel, and U.S. Marines, who prevented the fire from igniting large fuel storage tanks adjacent to the pier.

The 200-foot (61 m) stern section of the ship was cut away and towed to Newport News Shipbuilding and Drydock Company at Newport News, Virginia, for salvage. A new bow and forebody was constructed at Sun Shipbuilding and Drydock Company in Chester, Pennsylvania and welded there to the salvaged stern section, with the bridge and crew accommodations aft. The reconstructed ship, SS Shenandoah, entered service in 1965 and became USNS Potomac (T-AO-181) in 1976 when purchased by the Military Sealift Command

== See also ==
- USNS Potomac (T-AO-181)
