= Thomas B. Klakring =

American rear admiral (1904-1975)

Thomas Burton Klakring
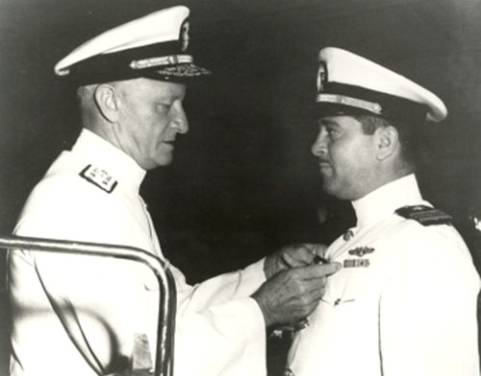
- ADM Chester Nimitz awards Navy Cross to Klakring.
- Born: December 19, 1904; Annapolis, Maryland, U.S.
- Died: July 24, 1975 (aged 70); San Diego, California, U.S.
- Military career
- Allegiance: United States of America
- Branch: United States Navy
- Service years: 1927 – 1949
- Rank: Rear Admiral
- Nickname: "Burt"
- Commands: USS Guardfish (SS-217) "Burt's Brooms" (wolfpack)
- Awards: Navy Cross (3); Silver Star

Thomas Burton Klakring (December 19, 1904 – July 24, 1975) was a United States Navy submarine commander during World War II.

== Life and career ==
T. B. Klakring, the only child of Colonel and Mrs. Leslie Klakring, was born in Annapolis, Maryland graduated from the United States Naval Academy with the Class of 1927. Lieutenant Commander Klakring commanded USS Guardfish (SS-217), from her commissioning in May 1942 through her fourth war patrol in March–April 1943.

Guardfish's first war patrol was in the hitherto unpatrolled waters off northeast Honshū and southern Hokkaidō. Klakring worked out a tactic of getting inside of the sea lanes at night — just off the shore — to put his ship in position to attack the many ships moving along the coast. On 4 September, Klakring attacked a convoy off Kuji, sinking two ships; a third which had retreated into the harbor was then hit and sunk from a range of over 7,500 yards. In all, Guardfish sank five major cargo ships with a total tonnage of almost 17,000 tons, and damaged others. It was one of the most successful patrols of the war, and on Guardfish's return, Klakring was decorated with the Navy Cross. In a rare press conference called to publicize the accomplishments of the ordinarily "Silent Service", he embellished his success, spinning a yarn about being close enough to a town to see a horse race being run, "but we were just a little too far away to be sure which horse won."

On his second patrol, Klakring took Guardfish to the East China Sea, where he attacked a seven-ship convoy on 21 October, sinking two ships. For her outstanding success on these first two war patrols, Guardfish received a Presidential Unit Citation. Guardfish was sent to the Bismarck Sea for her third patrol. There Klakring sank another cargo ship and two Japanese naval vessels — Patrol Boat No. 1 and the destroyer Hakaze — near Kavieng, New Ireland.

In November 1944, Klakring led a seven-sub wolfpack — "Burt's Brooms" — from the Marianas to the Japanese home islands. Klakring chose John S. Coye's Silversides as his flagship; the others were Saury, Tambor, Trigger, Burrfish, Sterlet, and Ronquil. Their mission was to 'sweep' Japanese patrol craft out of the way of a planned raid by Admiral William Halsey's Fast Carrier Task Force. However, according to Jasper Holmes, one of the cryptographers at Station HYPO, "The Japanese responded to the raid by rushing additional patrol craft and air search planes into the area, and there were probably more pickets in the area after the sweep than there were when it started."

Upon retirement in 1949, Captain Klakring received a tombstone promotion to the rank of rear admiral. He later served as vice president of the General Dynamics Corporation's Electric Boat Division. Klakring died on 24 July 1975 at Balboa Naval Hospital in San Diego, California.

== Honors ==
For his heroism while commanding Guardfish, Klakring was awarded the Navy Cross with two Gold Stars (in lieu of second and third awards). In addition, Guardfish was awarded her first Presidential Unit Citation while under Klakring's command. Admiral Klakring's other decorations include the Silver Star, Bronze Star Medal, China Service Medal, American Defense Service Medal, American Campaign Medal, Asiatic-Pacific Area Campaign Medal, and the World War II Victory Medal.

1st Row	Navy Cross 3d Award	Silver Star	Bronze Star
2nd Row	Presidential Unit Citation	China Service Medal	American Defense Service Medal with fleet clasp
3rd Row	American Campaign Medal	Asiatic-Pacific Campaign Medal2d Award	World War II Victory Medal

In 1982, the frigate USS Klakring (FFG-42) was launched, sponsored by Beverly Bohen, a niece of R.Adm. Klakring.
