= Potomac (tug) =

History
- Owner: Vane Brothers Company
- Builder: Thoma-Sea Boat Builders
- Yard number: 130
- Launched: 2007
- Identification: IMO number: 9475806; MMSI number: 367558180; Callsign: WDG6546

General characteristics
- Tonnage: 98 GT, 67 NT
- Length: 94.8 ft (28.9 m)
- Beam: 34 ft (10 m)
- Depth: 14.3 ft (4.4 m)
- Installed power: 2 × Caterpillar 3516 diesel engines 4,200 hp (3,100 kW)
- Propulsion: 2 × CNF Type 37 propeller nozzles

Built in 2007, Potomac (/pəˈtoʊmək/) is the seventh Patapsco-class tugboat built for Vane Brothers Company. Potomac was designed by Frank Basile of Entech & Associates, and built by Thoma-Sea Boat Builders in Houma, Louisiana.
