= USNS Potomac (T-AO-181) =

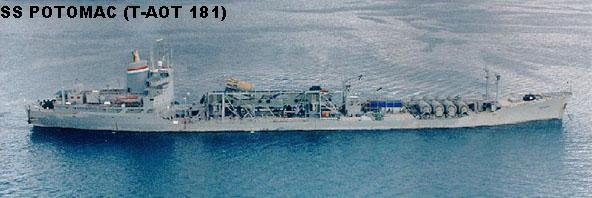
- USNS Potomac (T-AO-181)

History

United States
- Name: USNS Potomac
- Namesake: The Potomac River in Maryland, Virginia, and Washington, D.C.
- Builder: Sun Shipbuilding and Drydock Company, Chester, Pennsylvania
- Laid down: 1 March 1964
- Launched: 10 October 1964
- Acquired: 12 January 1976
- In service: 12 January 1976-26 September 1983
- Reclassified: Transport oiler T-AOT-181 30 September 1978.
- Honors and awards: Navy "E" for excellence award while civilian-owned in 1990s
- Fate: Scrapped 2012
- Notes: Operated as SS Shenandoah 1965-1976; Renamed USNS Potomac (T-AO-181) 12 January 1976 when purchased by the Military Sealift Command; Became SS Potomac when transferred to Ready Reserve Force 4 March 1984.

General characteristics
- Type: Fleet oiler
- Tonnage: 15,739 gross tons; 27,908 deadweight tonss
- Displacement: 7,333 to 7,816 tons light; 34,700 to 34,800 tons full load
- Length: 614 ft 5 in (187.27 m)
- Beam: 83 ft 5 in (25.43 m)
- Draft: 34 ft (10 m) maximum
- Installed power: 20,450 shp (15.3 MW)
- Propulsion: One Westinghouse steam turbine, two Combustion Engineering boilers, one shaft
- Speed: 18.5 knots (34.25 km/h)
- Range: 18,000 nautical miles (33,300 kilometers) at 18 knots
- Capacity: 173,000 barrels (27,500 m^{3})
- Complement: 37 civilians
- Armament: none
- Notes: Constructed using stern salvaged from USNS Potomac (T-AO-150), which had been destroyed by a fire; First ship equipped with an offshore petroleum discharge system (OPDS)

The fifth USNS Potomac (T-AO-181) was a United States Navy oiler in non-commissioned service with the Military Sea Transportation Service, later Military Sealift Command, from 1976 to 1983.

Potomac, sixth U.S. Navy ship to bear the name, was laid down as SS Shenandoah at Sun Shipbuilding and Drydock Company at Chester, Pennsylvania, on 1 March 1964 and launched on 10 October 1964. She was built using the 200-foot (61 m) salvaged stern section of the oiler USNS Potomac (T-AO-150)—a ship which had been destroyed by a fire on 26 September 1961—to which a new forward section was added. She was the first ship equipped with an offshore petroleum discharge system (OPDS), allowing her to supply petroleum products to forces ashore by pumping it directly over the shore instead of having to deliver it in a port.

The U.S. Navy acquired Shenandoah on 10 October 1964, and delivered her to Keystone Shipping Company on 11 December 1965. Keystone Shipping then chartered the ship to the Navy's Military Sea Transportation Service (MSTS), which later became the Military Sealift Command (MSC), on a bareboat basis, with Keystone Shipping providing the ship and MSTS providing crew and operating expenses. Shenandoah operated with a civilian crew in this manner until the MSC purchased her on 12 January 1976. The Navy then designated the ship T-AO-181 and renamed her USNS Potomac, making her the sixth U.S. Navy ship of the name.

In MSC service, Potomac continued to operate with a civilian crew. The oiler transported bulk petroleum products to the United States armed forces deployed overseas in the Pacific, and on 30 September 1978 was reclassified as a transport oiler and redesignated T-AOT-181.

On 26 September 1983, Potomac was taken out of MSC service and on 4 March 1984 she was transferred to the Ready Reserve Force (RRF), becoming SS Potomac.

In 1990, Potomac, operated by Bay Ship Management, owned by the Maritime Administration, and under charter to the Navy, was transferred to the Maritime Prepositioning Force (MPF) and spent more than 10 years stationed at Diego Garcia in the Indian Ocean. During this time she participated in sorties, exercises, and training activities, assisted in a humanitarian food relief effort for Rwanda, assisted forces in Bosnia and Herzegovina, and earned the U.S. Navy's "E" for excellence ship award during convoy exercises in the Indian Ocean.

SS Potomac left Diego Garcia and the MPF in 2000 and was transferred back to the RRF. She was transferred to the Maritime Administration for lay up in the National Defense Reserve Fleet at Beaumont, Texas. In 2006 she was downrated from the Ready Reserve Force and placed in the National Defense Reserve Fleet. She left the Beaumont reserve fleet for scrapping in Brownsville, Texas in September 2012.

== See also ==
- USNS Potomac (T-AO-150)
