= USS Kirkpatrick =

1943 Edsall-class destroyer escort

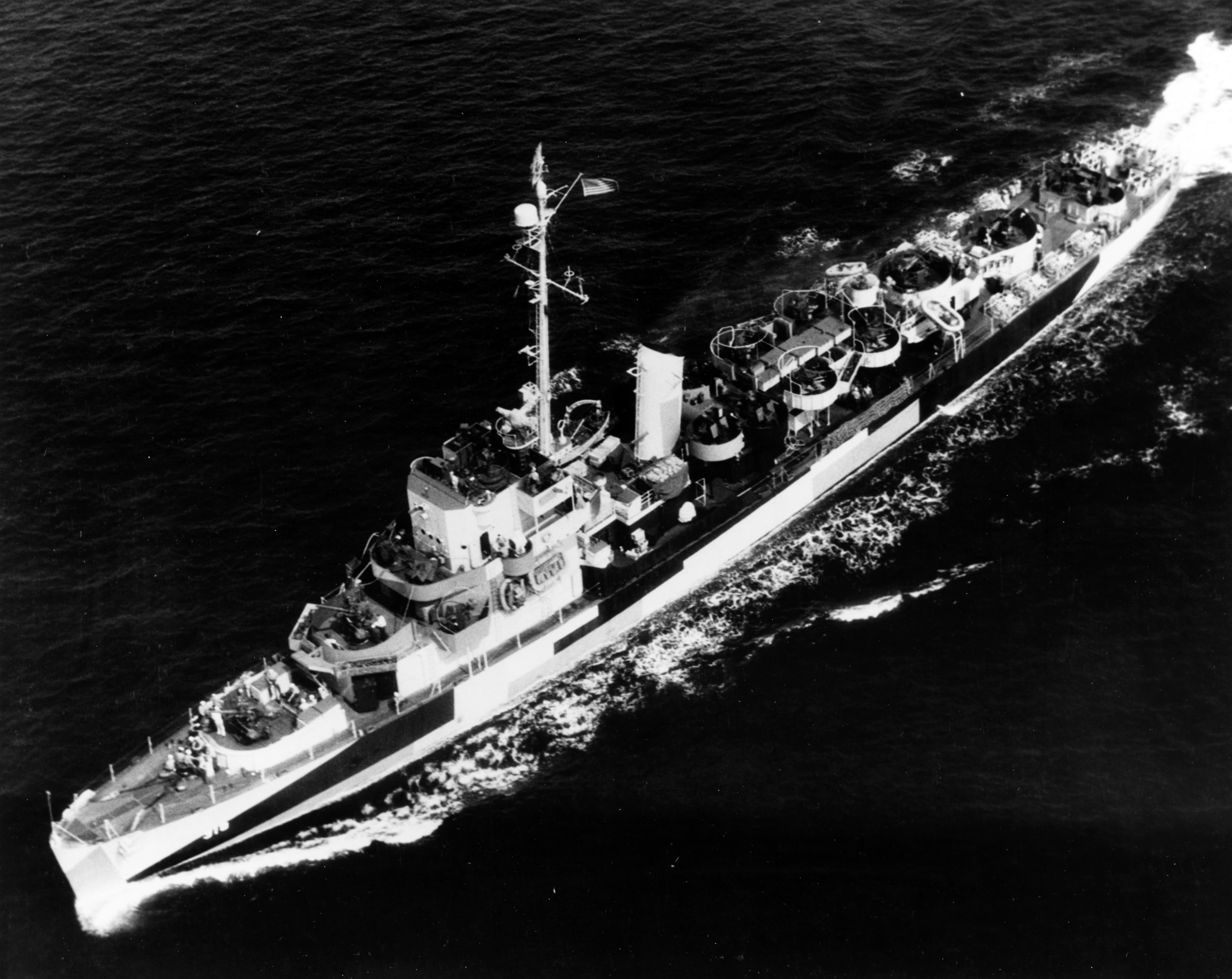

History

United States
- Namesake: Thomas Leroy Kirkpatrick
- Builder: Consolidated Steel Corporation, Orange, Texas
- Laid down: 15 March 1943
- Launched: 5 June 1943
- Commissioned: 23 October 1943
- Decommissioned: 24 June 1960
- Reclassified: DER-318, 1 October 1951
- Stricken: 1 August 1974
- Fate: Sold for scrapping 12 March 1975

General characteristics
- Class & type: Edsall-class destroyer escort
- Displacement: 1,253 tons standard; 1,590 tons full load
- Length: 306 feet (93.27 m)
- Beam: 36.58 feet (11.15 m)
- Draft: 10.42 full load feet (3.18 m)
- Propulsion: 4 FM diesel engines, 4 diesel-generators, 6,000 shp (4.5 MW), 2 screws
- Speed: 21 knots (39 km/h)
- Range: 9,100 nmi. at 12 knots; (17,000 km at 22 km/h)
- Complement: 8 officers, 201 enlisted
- Armament: 3 × single 3 in (76 mm)/50 guns; 1 × twin 40 mm AA guns; 8 × single 20 mm AA guns; 1 × triple 21 in (533 mm) torpedo tubes; 8 × depth charge projectors; 1 × depth charge projector (hedgehog); 2 × depth charge tracks

USS Kirkpatrick (DE-318) was an Edsall-class destroyer escort built for the U.S. Navy during World War II. She served in the Atlantic Ocean the Pacific Ocean and provided destroyer escort protection against submarine and air attack for Navy vessels and convoys. Post-war, she was converted to a radar picket ship to support the DEW Line.

== Namesake ==
Thomas L. Kirkpatrick was born on 5 July 1887, in Cozad, Nebraska. He was appointed Acting Chaplain, U.S. Navy on 19 February 1918. After serving as chaplain to stations in the United States and abroad, he was assigned to the USS North Dakota on 24 June 1919. For the next 20 years he served on USS Utah, USS Pittsburgh and USS Saratoga in addition to duty at Samoa from 1935 to 1937. He reported to USS Arizona on 13 September 1940, and was commissioned Captain on 1 July 1941. He died when Arizona was sunk during the Japanese Attack on Pearl Harbor on 7 December 1941.

== Construction and commissioning ==
She was launched 5 June 1943, by Consolidated Steel Corp., Orange, Texas, sponsored by Mrs. Genevieve Kirkpatrick, widow of Captain Kirkpatrick, and commissioned 23 October 1943.

== World War II North Atlantic operations ==
After shakedown along the Atlantic Coast, Kirkpatrick arrived Norfolk, Virginia, 23 December 1943, to commence transatlantic escort duty. From January 1944 to May 1945 she made one convoy escort mission to the Mediterranean, and 10 crossings between the United States and the British Isles. On her third voyage, USS Gandy another escort in the convoy rammed the German submarine U-550 after the U-boat had sunk tanker SS Pan Pennsylvania. Eleven prisoners from the sunken enemy submarine were captured in this action of 16 April 1944.

== Transfer to the Pacific Fleet ==
Kirkpatrick returned New York on completion of her final transatlantic escort mission 15 May 1945. After bombardment exercises in the Caribbean, she sailed for the Pacific. She entered Pearl Harbor 11 July, for tactics with submarines in Hawaiian waters until 29 August when she departed on an escort cruise to the Far East Departing Sasebo 2 November, Kirkpatrick arrived Charleston, South Carolina, 8 December 1945, via Pearl Harbor and the Panama Canal. She arrived Jacksonville, Florida, 5 days later and decommissioned 1 May 1946, at Green Cove Springs, Florida.

== Converted to Radar Picket Ship ==
Kirkpatrick was reclassified a radar picket ship (DER-318) on 1 October 1951, and recommissioned 23 February 1952. After shakedown and training out of Guantanamo Bay, Cuba, Kirkpatrick reported to Newport, Rhode Island, 11 July 1952, for radar picket operations on the Atlantic Barrier, the seaward extension of the Distant Early Warning (DEW) line across northern Canada. She manned radar picket stations in the North Atlantic until 1960, a seaborne unit of the air defense system of the United States and Canada. Incidental to this service she visited ports of northern Europe in the summers of 1958 and 1959. The radar picket ship departed Newport 27 March 1960, and arrived Philadelphia, Pennsylvania, 2 days later.

== Final Decommissioning ==
She decommissioned there 24 June 1960, and entered the Atlantic Reserve Fleet. She was struck from the Navy list on 1 August 1974 and was sold for scrapping 12 March 1975.
