= Welding Shipyards =

US Virginia shipbuilding company

Coordinates: 36.942836°N 76.320776°W

Penn-Jersey Shipbuilding Corp.
- Founded: 1940
- Founder: Daniel K. Ludwig
- Defunct: 1950
- Fate: Ceased operations
- Headquarters: Norfolk, Virginia

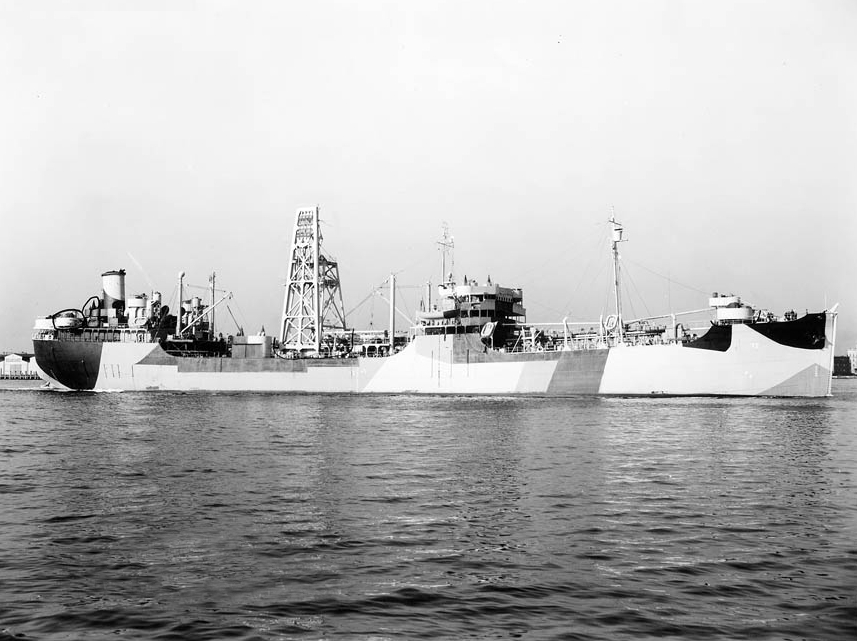
USS Niobrara, a T3-S tanker

Welding Shipyards was founded by American shipping businessman, Daniel K. Ludwig (1897–1992) in 1940 at Norfolk, Virginia on the Sewell's Point peninsula. Welding Shipyards build T3 tanker ships for World War II under the Emergency Shipbuilding Program. Welding Shipyards had one construction berth with 600 workers. The shipyard built what Ludwig was known for Oil tankers. Welding Shipyards built five type T3-S-BF1 tankers, the largest at the time. Ludwig' Welding Shipyards used what is called block construction. To shorten keel to ship launching time due losses to German U-boats, block construction was used. Ships blocks were built as the keel was being laid and then the prefabricated parts were then put in place and welded. With this construction time was reduced dramatically. Welding Shipyards and Ludwig had an important role in this new type of construction. All of the tanker ships were operated by Ludwig's shipping company that he founded, the National Bulk Carriers in 1936 in New York. National Bulk Carriers owned and operated oil tanker ships and bulk carriers. Some of the ships were among the largest in the world at that time. In 1953 Ludwig moved the shipyard operated to the Kure shipyard in Japan. Ludwig leased the Japanese navy Kure yard for 10 years (1950 to 1960). The Welding Shipyards site today is part of the Naval Station Norfolk. In 1940 and early 1941, Welding Shipyards converted older World War I surplus cargo ships into oil tankers.

== Ships built ==
Ships built at Welding Shipyards: (To save money some of the ships had used reconditioned engines).

	Original Name	GT	Feet	Delivered	Notes
*	Virginia	11,000	516	March 1941	Torpedoed and lost in Gulf of Mexico 1942 U-507 on 12 May 1942. (T3-S-BF1)
*	Bulkoil	8,000	456	Jan. 1942	renamed Munger T. Ball 1947, Transwestern 1958, scrapped 1961
*	Virginia	11,000	516	Nov. 1942	renamed Amoco Maryland 1955, Virginia 1966, scrapped 1967 (T3-S-BF1)
*	Pan-Massachusetts	11,000	516	April 1943	renamed Commonwealth 1953, Calgary 1964, Defiant Spirit 1965, Cerberus 1966, scrapped 1968 (sometimes noted as T3-S-BF1)
*	Pan-Pennsylvania	11,000	516	Nov. 1943	Torpedoed and lost off New Jersey 1944 (T3-S-BF1)
*	Bulklube	11,000	516	Dec. 1943	renamed Star Point 1962, Freeport 1963, scrapped 1963 (T3-S-BF1)
*	Bulkfuel	11,000	516	Feb. 1944	renamed Amoco Texas 1955, Bulkfuel 1961, scrapped 1964 (T3-S-BF1)
*	Bulkcrude	11,000	516	April 1944	renamed Blue Point 1962, scrapped 1963 (T3-S-BF1)
*	Bulkero	11,000	516	June 1944	renamed Amoco Florida 1957, Black Point 1962, scrapped 1963 (T3-S-BF1)
*	Phoenix	14,200	556	Nov. 1944	Damaged in collision in 1953 with Pan Massachusetts, 17 miles south of Wilmington in the Delaware River, (T3-S-BZ1) a total loss
*	Nashbulk	14,200	556	Feb. 1945	renamed Peranza 1973, scrapped 1975 (T3-S-BZ1)
*	Amtank	14,200	556	May 1945	renamed Mounthope 1972, scrapped 1979 (T3-S-BZ1)
*	Hampton Roads	14,200	556	June 1945	renamed Pine 1972, scrapped 1975 (T3-S-BZ1)
*	Ulysses	14,600	597	June 1947	renamed Phaedon 1964, scrapped 1966, Largest tanker in the world in 1947,
*	Danginn	722	191 foot yacht	Feb. 1950	renamed Henriette, now Chrysalis
*	Bulkpetrol	15,600	630	1948	renamed Vega 1966, combined with Mobile Energy 1971, scrapped 1975, Largest tanker in the world in 1948. (Improved T3-S-BZ1)
*	Bulkoil	15,600	630	1949	renamed Altair 1966, Pegasus 1967, Keo 1968, broke in two and sank off Nantucket 5 November 1969 in an Atlantic storm, with 210,000 US gallons fuel oil (Improved T3-S-BZ1)
*	Bulkoceanic	15,600	630	1949	renamed Pacocean 1968, broke in two and sank off Taiwan 1969 (Improved T3-S-BZ1)
*	Bulkstar	15,600	630	1949	renamed Amphialos 1963, broke in two and sank off Cape Cod 1964 (Improved T3-S-BZ1)
*	Bulktrader	15,600	630	1950	renamed Golden Drake 1964, exploded and sank off Venezuela 1972 (Improved T3-S-BZ1).

== T3-S-BF1 ==
T3-S-BF1 had a crew of 50 civilians and 31 United States Navy Armed Guard to man the deck guns and radio. Ships armament had: 1 × 5-inch gun, 1 × 3-inch/50-caliber gun and Oerlikon 20 mm cannon. T3-S-BF1 had two steam turbines, a single screw with 7,700 shp, top speed of 14 kn (26 km/h), was 515.9 feet long with a beam of 70 feet, was 11,016 tons and held up to 140,000 bbl.

== The T3-S-BZ1 ==
The first T3-S-BZ1, SS Phoenix was constructed in just 76 days keel to launching and 24 days to completion. The ships were 556 feet long, 80 foot beam, 14,160 gross tonnage, deadweight capacity 23,600 tons and with a barrel capacity off 217,000. T3-S-BZ1 had high pressure turbines with double reduction gears for 13,400 shp, to a single propeller with a top speed of 17 knots.

== Notable incident ==
- USS Pan Pennsylvania, a Type T3-S-BF1 tanker, on 16 April 1944 was sunk off Nantucket by a torpedo from U-boat U-550 commanded by Klaus Hänert. Pan-Pennsylvania was steaming from New York Harbor on the afternoon of 15 April 1944 as part of convoy CU-21, going to England with 140,000 barrels (22,000 m^{3}) of 80-octane aviation fuel. She had a crew of 50 men and 31 members of the Naval Armed Guard. The 28 merchant ships of CU-21 were accompanied by Escort Flotilla 21.5, which consisted of six destroyer escorts.

== See also ==
- History of the oil tanker
