= National Bulk Carriers =

Defunct American shipping company

- Industry: Shipping
- Founded: 1936
- Founder: Daniel K. Ludwig
- Headquarters: New York City
- Key people: John L. Notter

National Bulk Carriers was a shipping company which owned and operated oil tanker ships and bulk carriers. Some of them were among the largest in the world at that time. It was one of the largest multinational corporations in the world.

It was founded by Daniel K. Ludwig. At one time, the company had more than 20,000 employees and several billion dollars in assets.

== World War II ==
During World War II Ludwig owned and operated the Welding Shipyards, Norfolk, Virginia which built T3 tanker ships for National Bulk Carriers.

National Bulk Carriers fleet of T2 tankers were used to help the World War II effort. During World War II National Bulk Carriers operated merchant navy ships for the United States Shipping Board. During World War II National Bulk Carriers was active with charter shipping with the Maritime Commission and War Shipping Administration. National Bulk Carriers operated tankers for the merchant navy. The ship was run by its National Bulk Carriers crew and the US Navy supplied United States Navy Armed Guards to man the deck guns and radio.

== Ships ==
Some National Bulk Carriers tankers:

- SS Pan-Pennsylvania
- SS Pendelton
- SS Hat Creek
- HMS Attacker (D02), never entered service
- SS Nitro
- Roma
- Battle Mountain
- Callabee
- Evans Creek
- Fisher's Hill
- Five Forks
- Fort Charlotte
- Gold Creek
- Joshua Tree
- Kaposia
- Silverpeak
- Trimble's Ford
- Wagon Box
- Whittier Hills
- Virginia sunk by U-507

== See also ==
- World War II United States Merchant Navy
- List of Type T2 tankers
- American Petroleum Transport Corporation
