= History of the oil tanker =

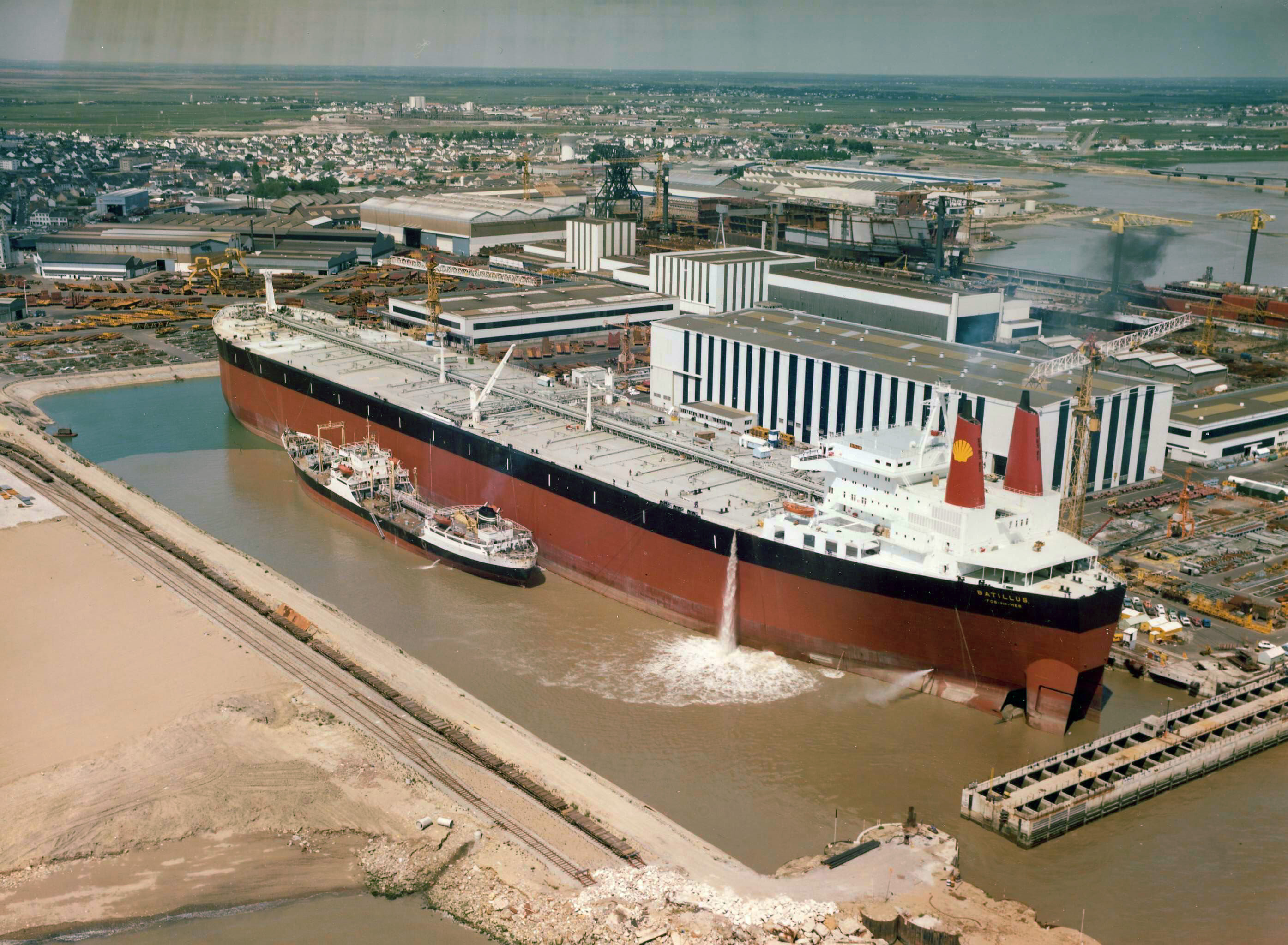
The Shell tanker Batillus while taking bunkers shortly after its completion at the yard Chantiers de l'Atlantique in Saint-Nazaire.

The history of the oil tanker is part of the evolution of the technology of oil transportation alongside the oil industry.

== Background ==
The technology of oil transportation has evolved alongside the oil industry. Although use of oil reaches to prehistory, the first modern commercial exploitation of oils distilled from material extracted from the ground dates back to James Young's manufacture of paraffin (kerosene) in 1850. In the early 1850s, oil began to be exported from Upper Burma, then a British colony. The oil was moved in earthenware vessels to the river bank where it was then poured into boat holds for transportation to Britain.

In the 1860s, the Pennsylvania oil fields became a major supplier of oil, and a center of innovation after Edwin Drake struck oil near Titusville, Pennsylvania. The first oil well in the United States was dug here in 1859, initially yielding around ten barrels per day. Within two years, the Titusville field was providing 3,000 barrels per day (480 m^{3}/d).

The invention of oil refining led to the availability of kerosene as lamp oil, which has a smokeless combustion in contrast with the until then highly used whale oil. The lamp oil became known as Pennsylvania Kerosine. Due to overfishing, whale oil became rare and expensive. By this time, petroleum oil had already begun to supplant fish, whale, and vegetable oils for applications such as indoor and outdoor lighting, and transatlantic export had already begun.

Break-bulk boats and barges were originally used to transport Pennsylvania oil in 40-US-gallon (150 L) wooden barrels. But transport by barrel had several problems. The first problem was weight: the standard empty barrel weighed 64 pounds (29 kg), representing 20% of the total weight of a full barrel. Also barrels were leaky, and could only be carried one way. Finally, barrels were themselves expensive. For example, in the early years of the Russian oil industry, barrels accounted for half the cost of petroleum production.

== Early oil tankers ==
The movement of oil in bulk was attempted in many places and in many ways. Modern oil pipelines have existed since 1860. The first oil tankers were two sail-driven tankers that were built in 1863 on England's River Tyne.

The first ocean-going oil-tank steamer, the Vaderland, was designed and built by Palmers Shipbuilding and Iron Company of the United Kingdom for the American-Belgian Red Star Line in 1873, although the vessel's use was soon curtailed by the authorities citing safety concerns. By 1871, the Pennsylvania oil fields were making limited use of oil tank barges and cylindrical railroad tank cars similar to those in use today. In 1877, the sailing ship Lindesnæs was converted to carry oil in bulk.

== The modern oil tanker ==
The modern oil tanker was developed in the period from 1877 to 1885. In 1876, Ludvig and Robert Nobel, brothers of Alfred Nobel, founded Branobel (short for Brothers Nobel) in Baku, Azerbaijan. It was, during the late 19th century, one of the largest oil companies in the world.

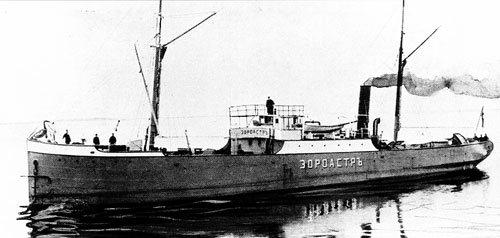
Zoroaster the world's first tanker, built by Sven Alexander Almqvist at Motala Varv and delivered to the Nobel brothers in Baku

Ludvig Nobel was a pioneer in the development of early oil tankers. He first experimented with carrying oil in bulk on single-hulled barges. Turning his attention to self-propelled tankships, he faced a number of challenges. A primary concern was to keep the cargo and fumes well away from the engine room to avoid fires. Other challenges included allowing for the cargo to expand and contract due to temperature changes, and providing a method to ventilate the tanks.

Nobel's Zoroaster, built in 1878, was the world's first successful oil tanker. He designed this ship together with Sven Alexander Almqvist, who also built the vessel. The contract to build it was signed in January 1878, and it made its first run later that year from Baku to Astrakhan. The Zoroaster design was widely studied and copied, with Nobel refusing to patent any part of it. In October 1878 he ordered two more tankers of the same design: the Buddha and the Nordenskjöld.

Zoraster carried its 242 long tons (246 t) of kerosene cargo in two iron tanks joined by pipes. One tank was forward of the midships engine room and the other was aft. The ship also featured a set of 21 vertical watertight compartments for extra buoyancy. The ship had a length overall of 184 feet (56 m), a beam of 27 feet (8.2 m), and a draft of 9 feet (2.7 m). Unlike later Nobel tankers, the Zoraster design was built small enough to sail from Sweden to the Caspian by way of the Baltic Sea, Lake Ladoga, Lake Onega, the Rybinsk and Mariinsk Canals and the Volga River.

When W.A. Riedmann of Geestemünde entered the petroleum trade in 1877, he noted the difficulties of using barrels, and began to experiment with the former emigrant ships Adona and Derby, filling their large iron drinking water tanks with oil. In October 1879 he purchased the Andromeda at Liverpool, an 1,876-ton full-rigged composite ship built in 1864, brought it to Teklenborgs Werft, and added seventy iron tanks to the hold. The piping between the tanks was connected so that all could be filled from a single tank. The composite hull, with structural members of iron covered with wooden planking, was especially suitable for the addition of tanks, because they could be firmly fastened to the iron beams. Andromeda made seven trips from Germany to North America as a sailing oil tanker.

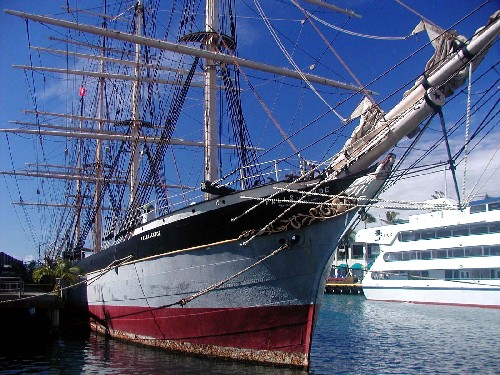
The Falls of Clyde is the oldest surviving American tanker and the world's only surviving sail-driven oil tanker.

Nobel also began to adopt a single-hull design, where the ship's hull forms part of its tank structure. In November 1880 he ordered his first single-hulled tanker, the Moses. Within a year, he ordered seven more single-hulled tankers: the Mohammed, Tatarin, Bramah, Spinoza, Socrates, Darwin, Koran, Talmud, and Calmuck. Branobel experienced one of the first oil tanker disasters. In 1881 Zoroaster's sister-ship, Nordenskjöld, exploded in Baku while taking on kerosene. The pipe carrying the cargo was jerked away from the hold when the ship was hit by a gust of wind. Kerosene then spilled onto the deck and down into the engine room, where mechanics were working in the light of kerosene lanterns. The ship then exploded, killing half the crew. Nobel responded to the disaster by creating a flexible, leakproof loading pipe which was much more resistant to spills.

In 1883, oil tanker design took a large step forward. Working for the Nobel company, British engineer Colonel Henry F. Swan designed a set of three Nobel tankers. Instead of one or two large holds, Swan's design used several holds which spanned the width, or beam, of the ship. These holds were further subdivided into port and starboard sections by a longitudinal bulkhead. Earlier designs suffered from stability problems caused by the free surface effect, where oil sloshing from side to side could cause a ship to capsize. But this approach of dividing the ship's storage space into smaller tanks virtually eliminated free-surface problems. This approach, almost universal today, was first used by Swan in the Nobel tankers Blesk, Lumen, and Lux.

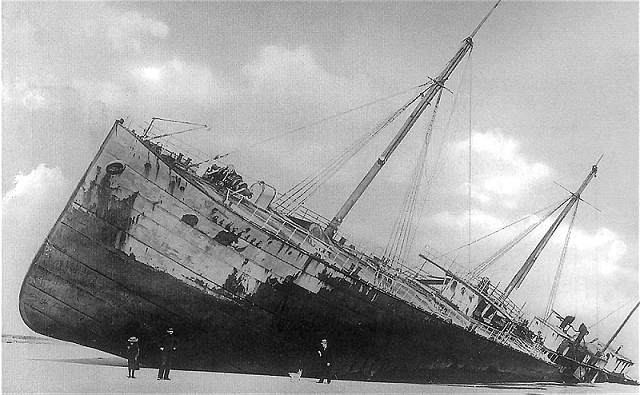
The Glückauf grounded in heavy fog at Blue Point Beach on Fire Island.

Others point to the Glückauf, another design of Colonel Swan, as being the first modern oil tanker. It adopted the best practices from previous oil tanker designs to create the prototype for all subsequent vessels of the type. It was the first dedicated steam-driven ocean-going tanker in the world and was the first ship in which oil could be pumped directly into the vessel hull instead of being loaded in barrels or drums. It was also the first tanker with a horizontal bulkhead, its features included cargo valves operable from the deck, cargo main piping, a vapor line, cofferdams for added safety, and the ability to fill a ballast tank with seawater when empty of cargo. The ship was built in Britain and was purchased by Wilhelm Anton Riedemann, an agent for the Standard Oil Company along with several of her sister ships. After the Glückauf was lost in 1893 after being grounded in fog, Standard Oil purchased the sister ships.

In 1903, the Nobel brothers built two oil tankers which ran on internal combustion engines, as opposed to the older steam engines. The Vandal, the first diesel-electric ship, was capable of carrying 750 long tons (760 t) of refined oil was powered by three 120 horsepower (89 kW) diesel motors. The larger Sarmat employed four 180 hp (130 kW) engines. The first seagoing diesel-powered tanker, 4,500-ton Mysl, was built by Nobel's competitors in Kolomna. Nobel responded with Emanuel Nobel and Karl Hagelin, 4,600-long-ton (4,700 t) kerosene tankers with 1,200-horsepower (890 kW) engines.

The 475 ft (145 m), seven-masted schooner Thomas W. Lawson, built in 1902, was the largest purely sail tanker ever built. It carried coal, and oil in barrels from Texas to the East Coast of the U.S. This 5,218 GRT schooner was fitted out as an oil tanker in 1906, and sunk in a storm off Isles of Scilly in December 1907.

== Asian oil trade ==
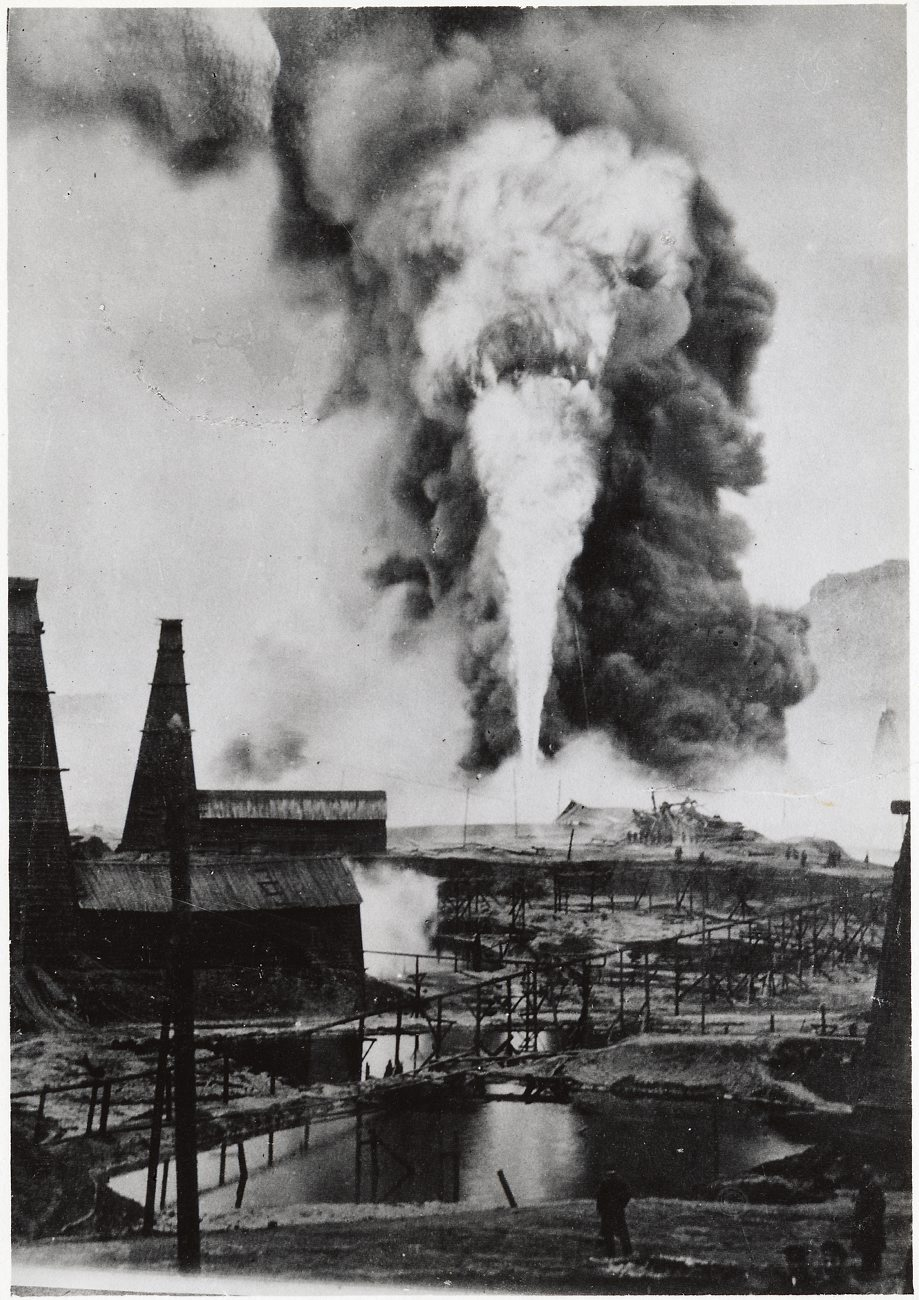
Branobel's oil facilities in Baku

The 1880s also saw the beginnings of the Asian oil trade. The oil industry in Azerbaijan was the largest producer in the world at that time, but was limited to the Russian market. John D. Rockefellers Standard Oil dominated the world market.

The idea that led to moving Russian oil to the Far East via the Suez Canal was the brainchild of two men: importer Marcus Samuel and shipowner/broker Fred Lane — the London agent for the De Rothschild Frères. Prior bids to move oil through the canal had been rejected by the Suez Canal Company as being too risky. Samuel approached the problem a different way: asking the company for the specifications of a tanker it would allow through the canal.

Armed with the canal companies specifications, Samuel had James Fortescue Flannery designing tankers for Bnito — the Russian oil company of the Rothschilds — and ordered three tankers from William Gray & Company in northern England. Named the Murex, the Conch and the Clam, each had a capacity of 5,010 long tons of deadweight. In 1893 the Samuel brothers founded the Tank Syndicate together with Fred Lane and Asian trading companies. In 1897 it was renamed Shell Transport and Trading company, forerunner of today's Royal Dutch Shell company.

With facilities prepared in Jakarta, Singapore, Bangkok, Saigon, Hong Kong, Shanghai, and Kobe, the fledgling Shell company was ready to become Standard Oil's first challenger in the Asian market. On August 24, 1892, the Murex became the first tanker to pass through the Suez Canal.

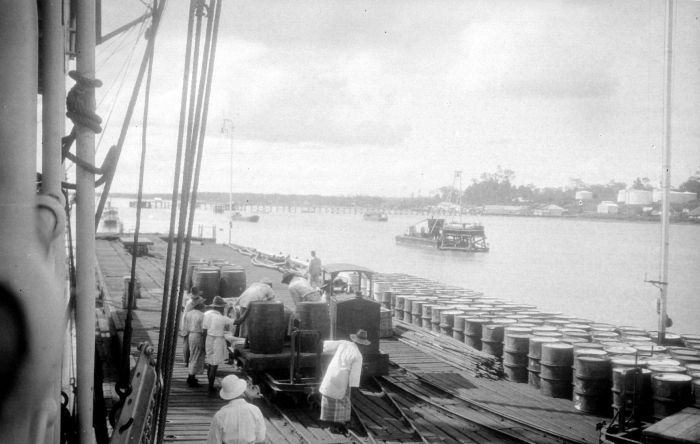
A Royal Dutch Petroleum dock in the Dutch East Indies (now Indonesia)

In the meanwhile, in 1890 the Koninklijke Nederlandsche Maatschappij tot Exploitatie van Petroleumbronnen in Nederlandsch-Indie (KNMEP) ("Royal Dutch Company for the Working of Petroleum Wells in the Dutch Indies") — part of Royal Dutch Petroleum — was founded. In 1892 it found oil near Pangkalan Brandan on Sumatra, just some months before Samuels kerosene arrived in Singapore. At first, chartered ships were used, but in 1896 KNMEP launched its first tankers, the Besitang and Berandan. The threat of the Tank Syndicate was reduced as the Dutch government excluded them from trading in the Dutch East Indies. To prevent a hostile takeover by Standard Oil, preference shares were issued. By the time Shell merged with Royal Dutch Petroleum in 1907, the company had 34 steam-driven oil tankers. Standard Oil started building tankers the same way as Shell and by 1900 owned around 60 tankers.

From 1912 Compañía Mexicana de Petróleo El Aguila ("Mexican Eagle Petroleum Company") — founded in 1909 by Weetman Pearson to develop the newly found Mexican oil fields, nationalized in 1938 as Pemex — also had its own tanker fleet. They quickly adopted Isherwood's new longitudinal framing system that allowed much larger ships and a simpler construction process. Just before World War I it owned a fleet of 20 tankers. Standard Oil did not participate directly in the newly discovered oil fields in Texas—such as Spindletop—and Oklahoma, which gave opportunities for new oil companies as Gulf Oil and Texas Fuel Company, later called Texaco. Avoiding the use of Standard Oil's pipe line system, they started using tankers to get their oil to the East Coast. In combination with the oil fields discovered in Mexico and Venezuela, this caused a rise in the demand for tankers, which gave opportunities for the first independents, such as the Norwegian Wilh. Wilhelmsen, that launched its first tanker in 1913.

== World War I and interbellum ==
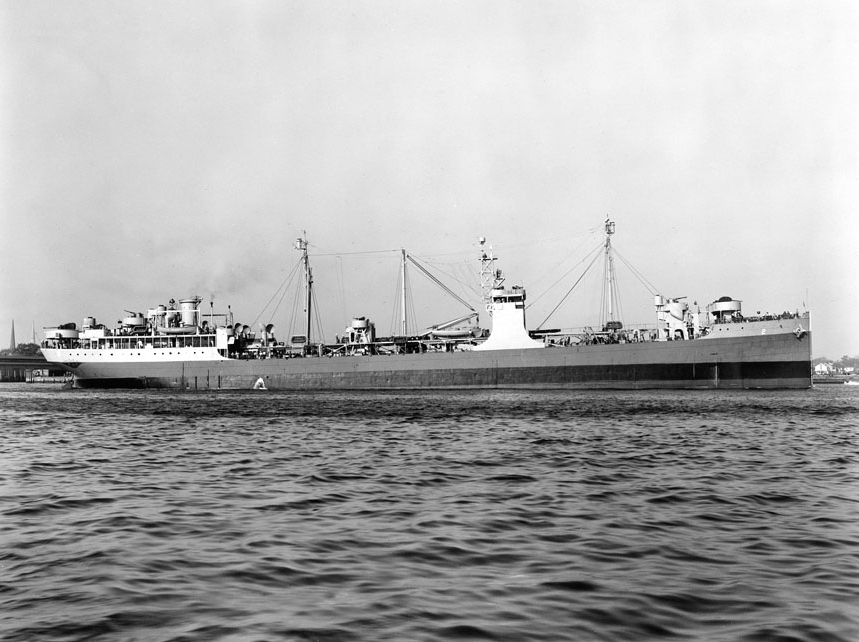
Underway replenishment was pioneered aboard the USS Maumee

The fleet oiler USS Maumee, launched on April 17, 1915, pioneered the technique of underway replenishment. A large ship at the time, with a capacity of 14,500 long tons of deadweight, Maumee began refuelling destroyers en route to Britain at the outset of World War I. This technique enabled the Navy to keep its fleets at sea for extended periods, with a far greater range independent of the availability of a friendly port. This independence proved crucial to victory in World War II by the ships commanded by Fleet Admiral Nimitz who, as Maumee's executive officer, had played a key role in developing underway replenishment.

Underway replenishment was quickly adopted by other navies. One example of this is the Australian fleet oiler HMAS Kurumba which provided underway replenishment services in the United Kingdom's Royal Navy from 1917 to 1919.

During World War I, unrestricted submarine warfare caused a shortage of tankers. The United States ambassador to the United Kingdom, Walter Hines Page, wrote "The submarines are sinking freight ships faster than freight ships are being built by the whole world. In this way, too, then, the Germans are succeeding. Now if this goes on long enough, the Allies' game is up. For instance, they have lately sunk so many fuel oil ships, that this country may very soon be in a perilous condition — even the Grand Fleet may not have enough fuel". Georges Clemenceau wrote to US president Wilson "Gasoline is as vital as blood in the coming battles…a failure in the supply of gasoline would cause the immediate paralysis of our armies". Wilson reacted strongly. The War Shipping Board commandeered all ships in the United States and also took over all yards. An unprecedented budget of $US1.3 billion was used for this end. At Hog Island, the largest shipyard in the world was built, known for the Hog Islander.

Between 1916 and 1921, 316 tankers were built with a total capacity of 3.2 million long tons of deadweight, where the entire world fleet before World War I was just above 2 million tons. In 1923 about 800,000 long tons were laid up, which gave enormous opportunities for speculators, such as Daniel Keith Ludwig. In 1925 he had bought the freighter Phoenix and put tanks in the holds. These riveted tanks leaked, which resulted in an explosive mixture. The resulting explosion killed two crew members and badly injured Ludwig. After this, he was a strong believer in welding.

The bunkering of ships with oil instead of coal, mass-production of automobiles and increasing aviation, all increased demand for oil and thus oil transport.

In 1928 the World's largest oil tanker was the 16,436 gross register tons (GRT) C.O. Stillman, completed that year for Canadian owners by Bremer Vulkan in Germany.

With the right connections at the Shipping Board, ships could be bought cheaply, which caused a lot of fraud. This system was too complicated for the oil companies however, so when World War II started, independents owned 39 percent of the world tanker fleet. This was especially because oil companies needed capital to invest in the growing oil market. By not buying the ships, but chartering, the bond rating of the oil companies was not affected, because the charter hire was not recognized as debt in that time. In 1934 H.T. Schierwater founded the International Tanker Owners' Association — later International Association of Independent Tanker Owners or INTERTANKO — to protect the interests of these companies in a strongly fluctuating market.

== World War II ==
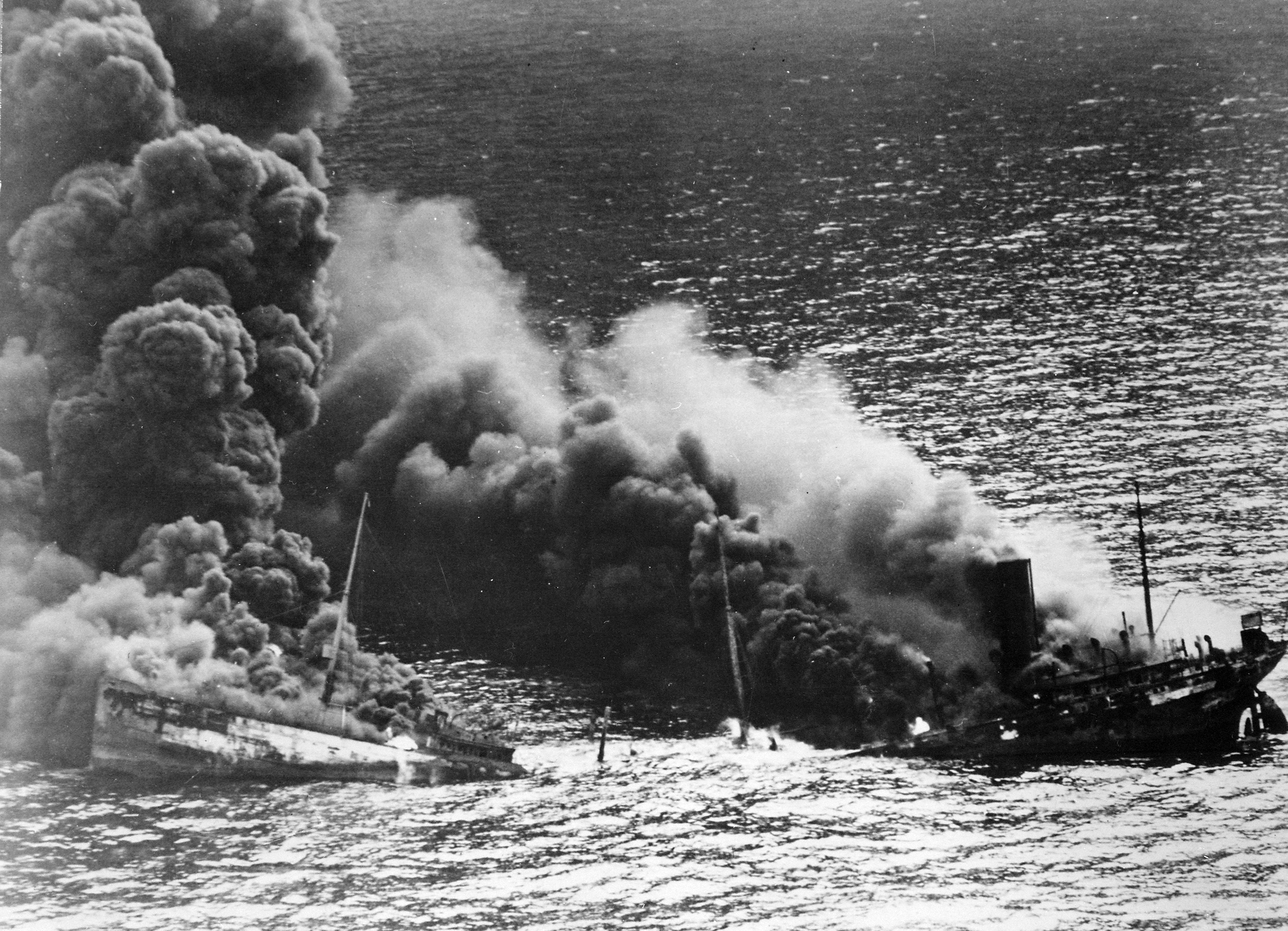
SS Dixie Arrow after being torpedoed off North Carolina. Allied oil tankers were often targeted by U-boats in World War II

When World War II broke out in 1939, Roosevelt could not support the United Kingdom directly, as in 1935 the Shipping Neutrality Act was signed to prevent Mussolini from invading Ethiopia. A solution was found by flagging out to Panama, which was under US control. The advantage for shipping companies was not having to comply with US regulations and not having to sail with US crew which were 50 percent more expensive than European crews at that time. In 1939 there were 52 tankers with a total capacity of 700,000 long tons of deadweight under Panamanian flag, a boost for flags of convenience.

The block construction method was invented in the United States, because German U-boats were sinking more ships than could be built with existing methods. By building in blocks and welding, the construction time could be reduced dramatically. Daniel Keith Ludwig had an important role in this, as he introduced the method at his Welding Shipyards in Norfolk as part of the Emergency Shipbuilding program.

Particularly the T2 tanker played an important part in World War II. The T2-SE-A1 with a capacity of 16,613 long tons of deadweight, was the most popular variant with nearly 500 built during the war. A small T1 tanker was used for small ports and near shore. The larger T3 tanker was used as a fleet oiler. After the war these tankers were used commercially for decades, and many were sold on the international market.

In this period, the Worldscale was introduced to determine freight tariffs.

Until 1956, tankers were designed to be able to navigate the Suez Canal. This size restriction became much less of a priority after the closing of the canal during the Suez Crisis of 1956. Forced to move oil around the Cape of Good Hope, shipowners realized that bigger tankers were the key to more efficient transport.

== Supertanker era ==
Where the size of tankers had been more or less the same for 25 years, after World War II they have grown in size significantly, initially slowly. A typical T2 tanker of the World War II era was 532 feet (162 m) long and had a capacity of 16,500 DWT. A modern ultra-large crude carrier (ULCC) can be 1,300 feet (400 m) long and have a capacity of 500,000 DWT. Several factors encouraged this growth. Hostilities in the Middle East which interrupted traffic through the Suez Canal contributed, as did nationalization of Middle East oil refineries. Intense competition among shipowners also played a part. But apart from these considerations is a simple economic advantage: The larger an oil tanker is, the more cheaply it can move crude oil, and the better it can help meet growing demands for oil.

Where the refinery of oil had taken place near the well earlier, this moved to the consumer location during this stage. Oil production in the Middle East developed and the dominance of product tankers was replaced by crude oil carriers. Soon, Panamax tankers were built, soon followed by Aframax and Suezmax tankers because of economics.

After the war, it was expected that a large number of tankers would be laid up, which indeed happened. The United States Maritime Commission had replaced the War Shipping Board, but fraudulent activities remained. Aristotle Onassis and Stavros Niarchos used this to buy tankers cheaply. The expected economic decline did not come, due to reasons amongst others the Marshall Plan, with the demand for oil increasing to the point in 1947 that there was a shortage of tankers. Freight tariffs tripled overnight, enabling some to recoup their investment in one voyage.

Ludwig had started Universe Tankships in 1947 and began building larger tankers in his Welding Shipyards. The Bulkpetrol of 30,000 long tons was the largest tanker of its time. Four of the five Bulk class tankers sank, likely because welding technology was not yet fully understood. As larger ships could not be constructed in the yard at Norfolk, Virginia, Ludwig went to Japan where he introduced the block construction method at the Kure Naval Yard. Here, in 1952, he built the Petrokure of 38,000 long tons. That same year, Onassis had a tanker of 45,000 long tons built and also Niarchos had supertankers built. Both Onassis and Niarchos claimed to be the largest independent tanker owner in the world.

The Sinclair Petrolore that Ludwig had built in 1955, was at 56,000 long tons not only the largest freighter in the world, but also a self-unloading ore-oil carrier, the only one of that type ever built. It exploded on 6 December 1960 near Brazil — likely because of cargo leakage in the double bottom — resulting in the largest spill until then with 60,000 tons.

In 1956 the Universe Leader of 85,000 long tons was built just before the Suez Crisis started with the seizure of the Pannegia . In ten years time, tanker size had quadrupled. In 1958, Ludwig broke the barrier of 100,000 long tons of heavy displacement. His Universe Apollo displaced 104,500 long tons, a 23% increase from the Universe Leader.

In 1962 Niarchos had the 106,000 long ton SS Manhattan built. This was the largest merchant vessel ever built in the United States. It was converted to have ice breaking capacities in 1969 and was the first commercial ship to cross the Northwest Passage. Although the voyage was a success, a second attempt to cross the passage in winter proved impossible, and there were numerous environmental concerns with the project, so it was cancelled and the Trans-Alaska Pipeline System built.

In 1966 the 206,000 long ton Idemitsu Maru was the first Very Large Crude Carrier (VLCC) built. In twenty years, the size of tankers had increased tenfold. In 1968, the first Ultra Large Crude Carrier, the Universe Ireland was built.

=== World tanker fleet 1957–1980 ===
Data according to.

At year end	Number of Vessels in Each Tonnage Class*			
At year end	25–99 dwt	100–149 dwt	150–199 dwt	200+ dwt
1957	427	0	0	0
1958	568	0	0	0
1959	715	0	0	0
1960	826	0	0	0
1961	892	2	0	0
1962	989	4	0	0
1963	1092	4	0	0
1964	1226	6	0	0
1965	1303	15	0	0
1966	1395	34	0	0
1967	1446	59	5	2
1968	1488	82	17	17
1969	1535	96	30	61
1970	1572	110	34	131
1971	1600	125	37	200
1972	1609	136	38	270
1973	1656	152	41	357
1974	1718	193	42	479
1975	1714	241	47	588
1976	1753	265	64	676
1977	1580	279	76	712
1978	1453	269	83	700
1979	1435	304**	45**	699
1980	1482	300	41	658

* Tonnage Classes are in thousands of long tons, dwt.
** Size categories for these years are 100,000 to 159,999 dwt and 160,000 to 199,999 dwt.

== Closure of the Suez Canal ==
The oil spill caused by the Torrey Canyon in 1967 caused a public awareness about the environmental dangers of oil tankers. Oil companies united in 1970 in the Oil Companies International Marine Forum to become involved in the following issuing of rules such as MARPOL 73. In 1968 also the International Tanker Owners Pollution Federation was founded to indemnify the victims.

For tanker owners, the Six-Day War of 1967 was of greater importance. The Suez Canal closed until 1975 and freight rates skyrocketed because of the shortage of tonnage now ships had to pass the Cape of Good Hope. Even larger tankers were now built, as the limitations of the Suez Canal were not governing anymore. In only a couple of years the size of tankers quadrupled to more than 500,000 long tons and there were even plans for tankers of 1,000,000 long tons. In 1969 the first ULCC's were built.

The Knock Nevis rivals some of the world's largest buildings in size

The world's largest supertanker ever was built for Tung Chao Yung in 1979 at the Oppama Shipyard of Sumitomo Heavy Industries, Ltd. as the Seawise Giant. This ship was built with a capacity of 564,763 DWT, a length overall of 458.45 metres (1,504.1 ft) and a draft of 24.611 metres (80.74 ft). She has 46 tanks, 31,541 square metres (339,500 sq ft) of deck, and is too large to pass through the English Channel.

Seawise Giant was renamed Happy Giant in 1989, Jahre Viking in 1991. From 1979 to 2004 she was owned by Loki Stream, at which point she was bought by First Olsen Tankers, renamed Knock Nevis and converted into a permanently moored storage tanker. The Batillus class supertankers are the biggest ships ever constructed by gross tonnage.

Although the tanker fleet increased around 12 percent annually around 1970, a shortage on tonnage remained. In 1973 this resulted in an enormous increase in new building orders, especially from oil majors that wanted to gain on the quicker deciding independents, who could ask enormous rates for their vessels. Where the existing tanker fleet comprised some 150 million long tons, in a quarter of a year a tonnage of 75 million was ordered, although new build prices doubled.

The increase in scale brought a new problem. Until then, the washing of tanks after cargo discharge was done by water. In December 1969 three tankers exploded during tank washing. The Dutch Shell tanker Marpessa sank off Dakar and became the largest merchant vessel ever lost. The other two, the British Shell tanker Mactra and the Norwegian Kong Haakon VII were damaged heavily, but remained afloat. Shell investigated the matter and came to the conclusion that water drops that impact steel with high velocity generates static electricity that can cause explosions in combination with cargo vapors. This only became apparent with the large sizes of the tanks of VLCC's.

The solution was found by filling the cargo tanks with inert gas (IG), reducing the oxygen level such that the tank remains below the explosive limit. The use of IG is seen as the biggest step in increasing tanker safety. Ten years later however, fifty people were killed when the Betelgeuse exploded at Whiddy Island in Bantry Bay. The Total tanker was still not fitted with inert gas. The Energy Concentration did have this system, preventing an explosion when it broke in two on 21 July 1980 during discharge at Europoort. It has also saved many lives during the Tanker War.

Washing with water in combination with the Load on Top system was replaced by crude oil washing (COW), a method developed by BP. The advantages were cleaner tanks, no corrosive sea water in cargo tanks and no polluted sea water being pumped overboard.

== Oil crisis and consolidation ==
On 10 October 1973 the Yom Kippur War begun, causing the 1973 oil crisis, tripling oil prices to US$10 per barrel, halting economic growth. Newly build ships sometimes went straight from the yard to lay-up. The situation worsened when the Suez Canal was reopened in 1975. Just when the situation began to improve in 1979, the Iranian Revolution caused the second oil crisis, causing oil prices to rise to US$30. Ships were sometimes sent to the breakers after being in service for only ten years. It took until the end of the 1980s before any profits were being made in oil transport.

In 1979, World-Wide Shipping of Yue-Kong Pao with 204 vessels, many of them tankers, was the largest shipping company in the world with a tonnage of 20.5 million, but in the five years after that he sold some 140 vessels to manage the crisis. In 1980, Daniel K. Ludwig had the largest fleet after Y. K. Pao and C. Y. Tung and was regarded the richest man of the United States. John Fredriksen owns the largest tanker operator in the world, Frontline. He also owns almost ten percent of the largest shipping company in the world, Overseas Shipholding Group.

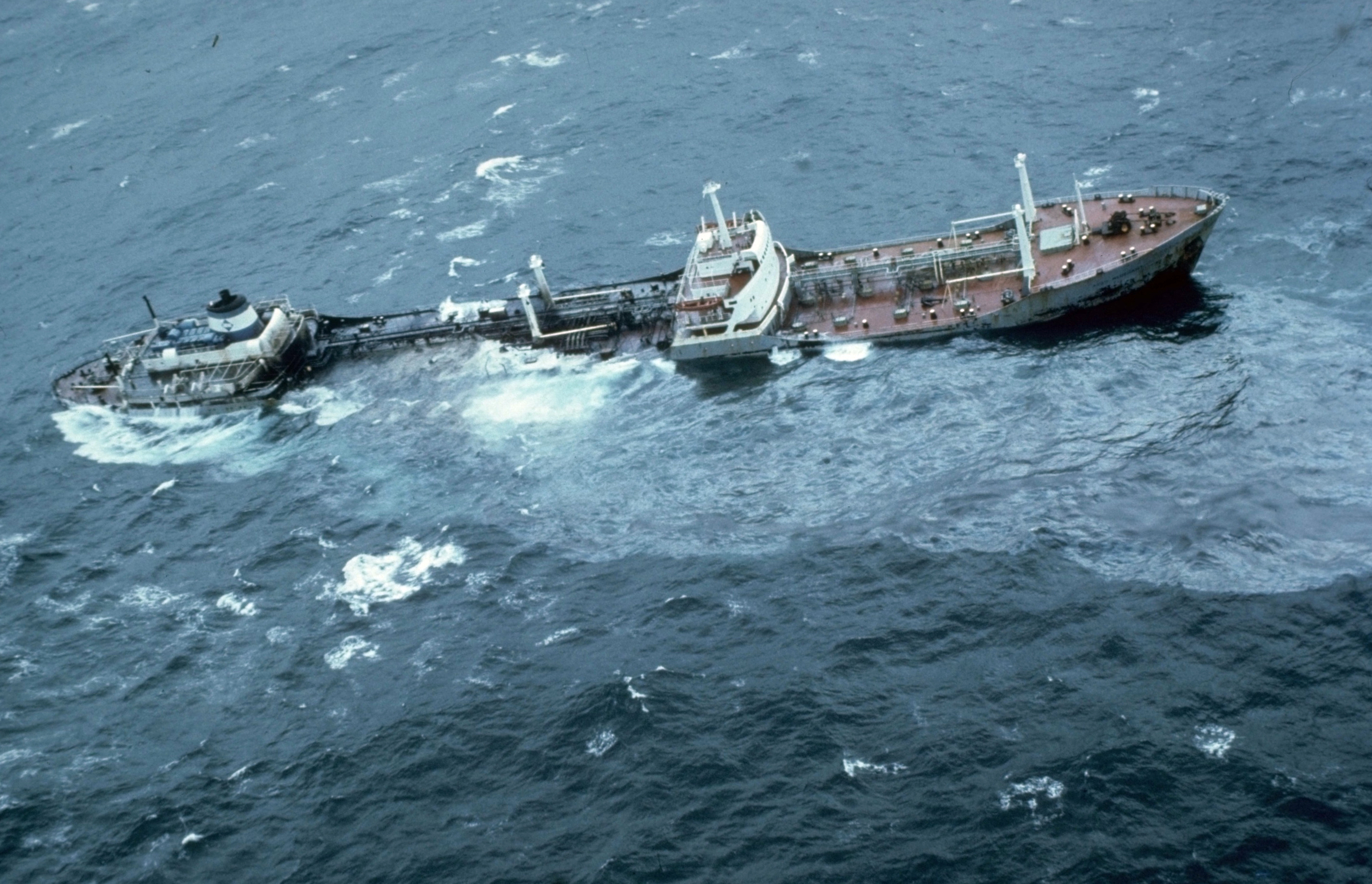
During the salvage of the Argo Merchant, the Intervention Convention was used for the first time.

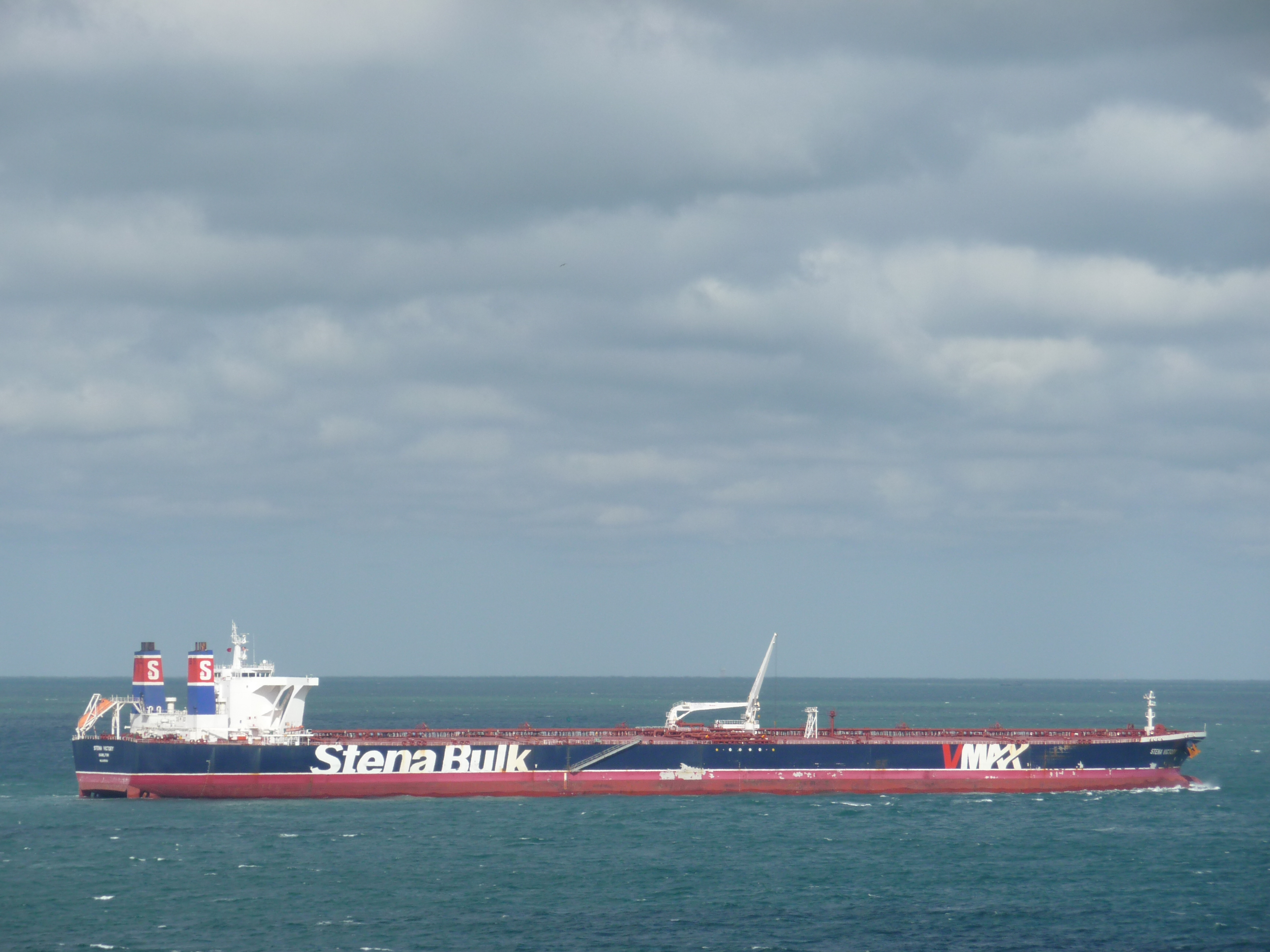
Tanker Stena Victory, a V-MAX, approaching LOOP from anchorage

In 1976, the Intervention Convention was used for the first time when the US Coast Guard took on the salvage of the Argo Merchant, although the vessel was in international waters. This was the first time the monopoly of flag states was broken through.

The Exxon Valdez oil spill was the incentive to introduce legislation requiring tankers to have a double hull, a measure that is not seen as the best solution by all experts. Where a double hull should minimize the consequences after a disaster, Concordia Maritime developed the Stena V-MAX, a VLCC with two propellers, two rudders and two redundant engine rooms, where a single fault does not result in loss of steering, reducing the chances of a grounding.

The size of VLCCs and ULCCs limits their sailing area and available ports. In the United States, Louisiana Offshore Oil Port (LOOP) is the only facility that is able to handle VLCCs. To overcome this, lightering from large tankers in smaller ones that are able to reach the destination port. The largest oil terminal is Ras Tanura in Saudi Arabia.

ULCCs had not been built since the beginning of the 1980s until the Greek Hellespont Steamship Corporation ordered four double-hull supertankers in 1999. These ships were built in 2002 and 2003 as the Hellespont Alhambra, Hellespont Metropolis, Hellespont Tara and Fairfax. Hellespont sold these ships to Overseas Shipholding Group and Euronav in 2004. These TI class supertankers – currently known as the TI Asia, TI Europe, TI Oceania, and TI Africa — are as of 2008 the world's four largest working supertankers.

Each of the four sister ships has a capacity of over 441,500 DWT, a length overall of 380.0 metres (1,246.7 ft) and a cargo capacity of 3,166,353 barrels (503,409,900 L). The first ULCC tankers to be built for some 25 years, they were also the first ULCCs to be double-hulled. To differentiate them from smaller ULCCs, these ships are sometimes given the V-Plus size designation. In February 2008, their owners announced plans to convert TI Africa and the TI Asia into stationary floating storage and offloading units to be placed in the Al Shaheen oilfield near Qatar in late 2009.

With the exception of the pipeline, the tanker is the most cost-effective way to move oil today. Worldwide, tankers carry some 2 billion barrels (3.2×10^{11} L) annually, and the cost of transportation by tanker amounts to US$0.02 per gallon at the pump.

== Open registries ==
The first open register was Panama in 1916. Fear for political instability and high and excessive consular fees led the president of Liberia, William Tubman, in 1948 to start an open register with the help of Edward Stettinius, Jr. The World Peace of Stavros Niarchos was the first ship in that register. In 1967 Liberia passed the United Kingdom as the largest register. Nowadays, Panama — currently the largest register — and Liberia have one third of the world fleet under their flag.

Open registries have been branded as flags of convenience by ITF (International Transport Workers' Federation) to have lower standards for vessel, equipment, and crew than the traditional maritime countries and often have classification societies certify and inspect the vessels in their registry, instead of by their own shipping authority. This made it attractive for ship owners to change flag, whereby the ship lost the economic link and the country of registry. With this, also the link between classification society and traditional maritime country became less obvious - for instance Lloyd's with the United Kingdom and ABS with the United States. This made it easier to change class and introduced a new phenomena; class hopping. A ship owner that is dissatisfied with class can change to a different class relatively easily. This has led to more competition between classes and a relaxation of the rules. This has led to the shipping industry losing confidence in the classification societies, but also by the European Commission. Today open registries are amongst the leading performers on the white lists, are first to ratify and implement International Conventions, including Labor Standards, and are often offering the level of service and attention which the traditional national registries are missing.

To counteract class hopping, the IACS has established TOCA (Transfer Of Class Agreement).

In 1978, a number of European countries agreed in The Hague on a memorandum that agreed to audit whether the labour conditions on board vessels were according to the rules of the ILO. After the Amoco Cadiz sank that year, it was decided to also audit on safety and pollution. To this end, in 1982 the Paris Memorandum of Understanding (Paris MoU) was agreed upon, establishing Port State Control, nowadays consisting of 24 European countries and Canada. In practice, this was a reaction on the failure of the flag states - especially flags of convenience that have delegated their task to classification societies - to comply with their inspection duties.

== See also ==
- Aristotle Onassis
- List of oil spills
- List of replenishment ships of the Royal Fleet Auxiliary
- List of tankers
- List of Type T2 Tanker names
- Marine transfer operations
- Stavros Niarchos
