= Italian ship Altair =

Altair was the name of at least two ships of the Italian Navy and may refer to:

- Italian torpedo boat Altair, a Spica-class torpedo boat launched in 1936 and sunk in 1941.
- Italian frigate Altair (F 591), a Cannon-class destroyer escort launched in 1943 as USS Gandy. Transferred to Italy and renamed in 1951. Re-rated as a frigate in 1957 and sunk as a target in 1971.
