= SS Hat Creek =

American tanker

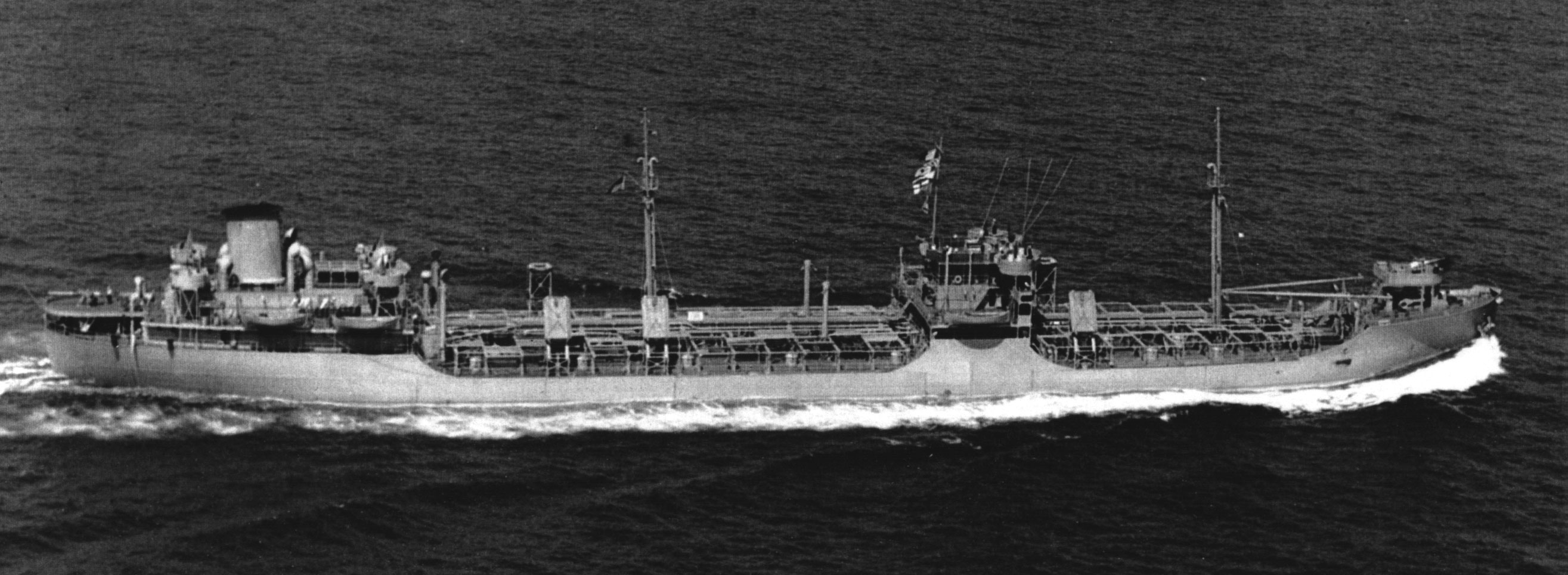
- SS Hat Creek in August 1943

History

United States
- Name: SS Hat Creek
- Namesake: Hat Creek
- Builder: Alabama Drydock and Shipbuilding Company, Mobile, Alabama
- Yard number: 251
- Laid down: 1943
- Launched: 30 April 1943
- Renamed: Point Judy (1979), Point Milton (1980)
- Identification: IMO number: 5015062
- Fate: Scrapped 1983

General characteristics
- Type: T2-SE-A1 tanker
- Tonnage: 12532
- Displacement: 21,880 long tons (22,231 t)
- Length: 523 ft (159 m)
- Beam: 68 ft (21 m)
- Draft: 30 ft (9.1 m)
- Installed power: 7,240 shp (5,399 kW)
- Propulsion: turbo-electric transmission, single screw
- Speed: 15 knots (28 km/h; 17 mph)
- Range: 12,600 nmi (23,300 km)

SS Hat Creek was a Type T2-SE-A1 tanker built at Alabama Drydock and Shipbuilding Company of Mobile, Alabama in July 1943. She was built as hull number 251 and USMC number 5354. She was sold in 1946 to National Bulk Carriers and a year later had a new two cylinder steam turbine installed. In 1957 she had a new middle section installed and was renamed Amoco Virginia. Subsequent renamings included Point Judy (1979) and Point Milton (1980).

Parts of the middle section were converted into deck barges and named Venemac 5 and Venemac 6.
