= SS Pan-Pennsylvania =

American tanker sunk during World War II

History

United States
- Name: SS Pan-Pennsylvania
- Operator: National Bulk Carriers
- Builder: Welding Shipyards, Norfolk, Virginia
- Yard number: 13
- In service: November 1943
- Identification: Official number: 244054
- Fate: Sunk, April 16, 1944

General characteristics
- Type: Type T3-S-BF1 tanker
- Tonnage: 11,016 GRT; 18,900 DWT
- Length: 515 ft 11 in (157.25 m)
- Beam: 70 ft (21 m)
- Propulsion: 2 × steam turbines, 7,700 shp (5,742 kW); 1 shaft
- Speed: 14 knots (26 km/h; 16 mph)
- Crew: 50 + 31 U.S. Navy Armed Guard
- Armament: 1 × 5 in (130 mm) gun; 1 × 3 in (76 mm) gun; 8 × 20 mm guns

SS Pan-Pennsylvania was a Type T3-S-BF1 tanker of the United States, which was sunk by German U-boat U-550 in April 1944.

== Ship history ==
The ship was built at the Welding Shipyards in Norfolk, Virginia, under Maritime Commission contract #2187, and was delivered to National Bulk Carriers, Inc. in November 1943. The 11,016 gross register tons (GRT) ship was 515 feet 11 inches (157.25 m) long and 70 feet (21 m) in the beam, and was powered by two steam turbines, delivering 7,700 shp (5,742 kW) to a single propeller, giving her a top speed of 14 knots (26 km/h; 16 mph).

=== Sinking ===
Pan-Pennsylvania sailed from New York Harbor on the afternoon of 15 April 1944 as part of convoy CU-21, bound for England, carrying 140,000 barrels of 80-octane aviation fuel, a crew of 50 men, and 31 members of the Naval Armed Guard. The 28 merchant ships of CU-21 were accompanied by Escort Flotilla 21.5, which consisted of six destroyer escorts.

Weather conditions were initially poor, and the convoy was not able to settle into the standard convoy formation until the next morning. However, they had already been observed by the U-550 which, under the command of Kapitanleutnant Klaus Hanert, was on her first combat patrol. At 8 a.m. SS Pan-Pennsylvania was straggling behind the rest of the convoy when she was hit by a torpedo from U-550 on her port side.

As Pan-Pennsylvania began to settle, the U-550 approached her, using the stricken ship to mask their presence from the three escort destroyers — Joyce, Peterson and Gandy — who rapidly approached, scanning the area with their sonar. Aboard Pan-Pennsylvania a fire broke out in the engine room, and the captain ordered the crew to abandon ship, as she began to settle and list to port. The crew launched two lifeboats and three life-rafts as water began to wash over the deck. The tanker continued to settle and then slowly capsized.

U-550, meanwhile, attempted to slip away, but was detected by Joyce, which promptly attacked with a pattern of 13 depth charges, bracketing the submarine and forcing her to the surface. The three escorts opened fire on her and Gandy rammed her abaft the conning tower. Peterson fired two more depth charges from her "K" guns, which exploded alongside the submarine. U-550 attempted to man her deck gun and machine guns, but the crews were mown down by gunfire. The crew of U-550 then set scuttling charges and attempted to abandon her, but the charges exploded prematurely and she quickly sank taking most of the crew with her. The entire action, from the detection of U-550 to the time her sinking, lasted only thirteen minutes.

Of the crew of Pan-Pennsylvania, 31 were rescued by Joyce and 25 by Peterson, leaving 25 unaccounted for. Only 12 Germans survived, including her Captain; 44 were lost.

On the day following the attack an attempt was made to sink the still burning hulk of Pan-Pennsylvania with gunfire. This failed, so she was bombed and sunk by aircraft the day after at position 40°24′N 69°37′W.

The wreck of U-550 was found on July 23, 2012, in deep water about 70 miles south of Nantucket, Massachusetts.
