= USS Joyce =

WWII US naval vessel

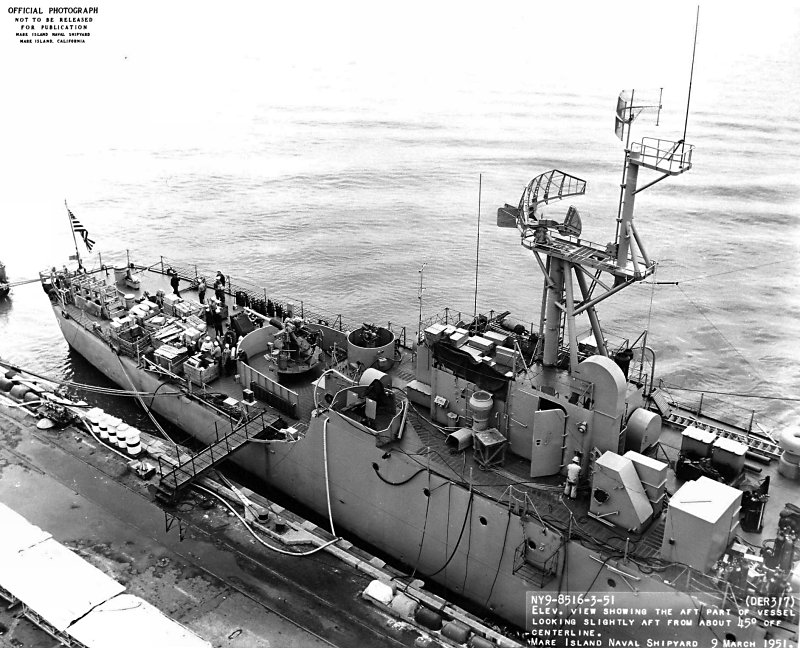

History

United States
- Name: Joyce
- Namesake: Philip Michael Joyce
- Builder: Consolidated Steel Corporation, Orange, Texas
- Laid down: 8 March 1943
- Launched: 26 May 1943
- Commissioned: 30 September 1943
- Decommissioned: 17 June 1960
- Reclassified: DER-317, 13 September 1950
- Stricken: 1 December 1972
- Fate: Sold for scrapping 11 September 1973

General characteristics
- Class & type: Edsall-class destroyer escort
- Displacement: 1,253 tons standard; 1,590 tons full load
- Length: 306 feet (93.27 m)
- Beam: 36.58 feet (11.15 m)
- Draft: 10.42 full load feet (3.18 m)
- Propulsion: 4 FM diesel engines, 4 diesel-generators, 6,000 shp (4.5 MW), 2 screws
- Speed: 21 knots (39 km/h)
- Range: 9,100 nmi. at 12 knots; (17,000 km at 22 km/h)
- Complement: 8 officers, 201 enlisted
- Armament: 3 × single 3 in (76 mm)/50 guns; 1 × twin 40 mm AA guns; 8 × single 20 mm AA guns; 1 × triple 21 in (533 mm) torpedo tubes; 8 × depth charge projectors; 1 × depth charge projector (hedgehog); 2 × depth charge tracks

USS Joyce (DE-317) was originally commissioned as a US Coast Guard Edsall-class destroyer escort built for the U.S. Navy during World War II. She served in the Atlantic Ocean and the Pacific Ocean and provided destroyer escort protection against submarine and air attack for Navy vessels and convoys. During its World War II service, on two different engagements with enemy submarines, the Joyce rescued survivors of the tanker SS Pan- Pennsylvania and its sister ship USS Leopold. Joyce received one battle star for its service during World War II.

== Namesake ==
Philip Michael Joyce was born on 23 October 1920 in St. Louis, Missouri. He enlisted in the Navy on 11 July 1940. Selected for an appointment as a midshipman during his preliminary training, he was commissioned Ensign on 28 February 1941. He served on USS Langley until 10 August when he reported to USS Peary for duty in the Pacific. Following the outbreak of war between the United States and the Empire of Japan, Peary suffered heavy damage during a Japanese air attack while moored at Cavite, Philippines on 10 December 1941. Despite this and two subsequent attacks, Peary reached Darwin, Australia, effected repairs and commenced antisubmarine patrols. While anchored in Darwin harbor 19 February 1942 Peary was destroyed by five bombs which struck it during the Japanese Bombing of Darwin. Peary sank and Joyce was among those killed.

== Construction and commissioning ==
She was laid down 8 March 1943 by the Consolidated Steel Corp., Orange, Texas; launched 26 May 1943; sponsored by Mrs. Harold T. Joyce, mother of Ensign Joyce; and commissioned 30 September 1943.

== World War II North Atlantic operations ==
After shakedown off Bermuda, Joyce joined Escort Division 22 for transatlantic convoy escort duty. Sailing from Norfolk, Virginia, 4 December 1943, she helped escort a 100-ship convoy to North Africa. She returned to New York from Casablanca 31 January 1944, then departed 1 March as part of the escort for a fast convoy bound for Derry, Northern Ireland. While steaming 400 miles south of Iceland on the night of 9 March Joyce braved two attacks from a German U-boat to rescue 28 survivors from the stricken USS Leopold, which was torpedoed while investigating a radar contact. Joyce steamed at top speed for Derry and arriving 11 March, transferred Leopold's wounded. A week later she departed for New York in company with a westbound convoy, which reached the East Coast 28 March.

== Sinking of German Submarine U-550 ==
Joyce departed New York 15 April for her second escort run to Northern Ireland. While screening for a straggler the following morning she was ordered to direct rescue operations for the gasoline tanker SS Pan-Pennsylvania, which was torpedoed and set aflame while taking station in the convoy. After picking up 31 survivors, including the tanker's captain, Joyce detected a submarine by sonar at 0950 and pressed home an attack. She dropped a deadly pattern of 13 depth charges which forced U-550 to the surface, bow first, some 2,000 yards to her stern. A screening escort, USS Gandy, opened fire and rammed the after section of the U-boat. Joyce, Gandy, and Peterson shelled the submarine, silenced her deck guns and forced the hapless U-550 to surrender. Joyce ordered the Germans to abandon ship, but before a boarding party could seize the captured prize, the Germans scuttled her. Only 40 minutes after Joyce had detected her, she plunged stern first beneath the waves. Joyce rescued and took prisoner 13 survivors, including the U-boat's skipper, escorted the convoy safely to Derry 26 April, and returned in convoy to the United States where she arrived New York 12 May. During the next year Joyce conducted eight more escort voyages for convoys bound from New York to Great Britain; she returned to New York from her last convoy run 13 May 1945.

== Transferred to the Pacific Fleet ==
Joyce departed New York 4 June and steamed for ASW and gunnery training with units of Escort Division 22 in the Caribbean. Sailing from Guantánamo Bay 20 June, she transited the Panama Canal the 23d and steamed via San Diego, California, for Pearl Harbor where she arrived 11 July for duty with the Pacific Fleet. She conducted ASW exercises in the Hawaiian operating area until 28 August when she sailed for Saipan Island and Sasebo, Japan, as escort for a convoy of amphibious landing ships.

== End-of-War activity ==
Upon her arrival at Sasebo 22 September, she escorted a convoy of LSTs to the Philippine Islands 3 days later, arriving Leyte Gulf 2 October. She remained in the Philippines on escort duty throughout October and sailed from Guiuan, Samar, 4 November with 29 returning veterans for Pearl Harbor. Arriving the 15th, she continued to San Diego 17 November; upon her arrival the 23d she debarked her passengers and received orders to report for duty with the Atlantic Fleet. Sailing from San Diego the 25th, she passed through the Panama Canal 3 December and put into New York harbor on the 10th.

Joyce remained at New York for an inactivation overhaul until 21 January 1946 when she departed for a 3-day voyage to Green Cove Springs, Florida. She remained there and decommissioned 1 May to become a unit of the Florida Group, Atlantic Inactive Reserve Fleet.

== Converted to Radar Picket Ship ==
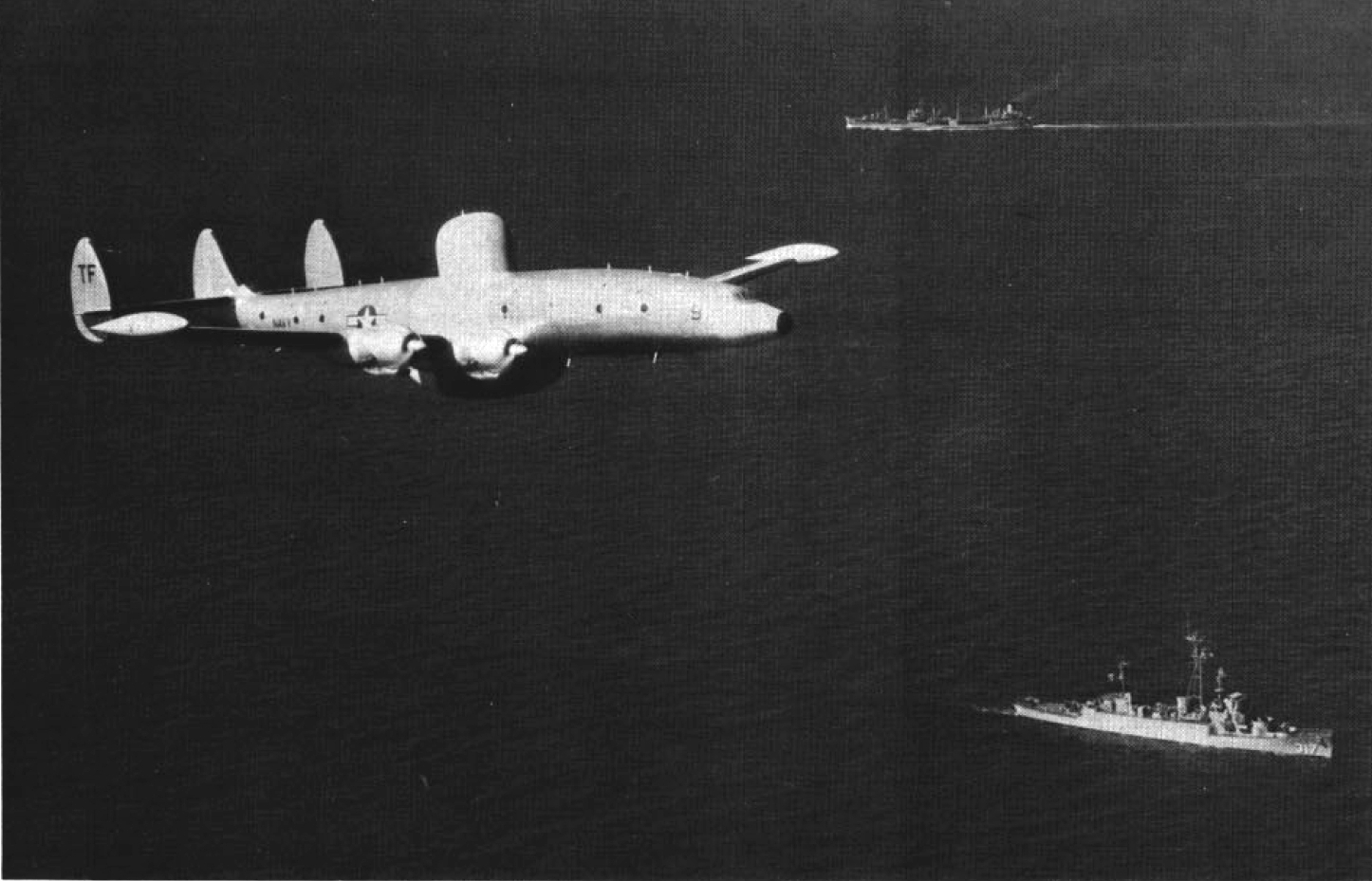
A WV-2 flies over USS Joyce in the 1950s.

With the outbreak in June 1950 of Communist aggression in South Korea Joyce was recalled to active duty; taken to Mare Island Naval Shipyard, Vallejo, California, where she converted to a radar picket escort (DER-317); and recommissioned 28 February 1951.

Following shakedown along the California coast, she departed 12 May for duty with the Atlantic Fleet; arriving Newport, Rhode Island, 21 June, she joined Escort Squadron 10 and commenced picket duty. She participated in air defense exercises along the New England coast and during the next 8 months made three barrier picket patrols along the Atlantic coast from Newfoundland to Puerto Rico. She steamed from Newport 19 February 1952 in company with Escort Squadron 10 bound for practice barrier patrols in the Caribbean. Cruising the Caribbean from Panama to Trinidad, she returned to Newport 20 March and joined Escort Squadron 16.

After conducting ASW tactics with USS Cobbler in the Virginia Capes Operating Area, she departed Newport 30 June, joined the Eastern Air Defense Force, and commenced radar barrier station patrols to protect North America from surprise attack. Interrupted only by overhauls and refresher training, these picket patrols continued for 5 years; Joyce ranged the Atlantic from Nova Scotia and Newfoundland to the Virginia Capes and the West Indies.

Departing Newport 17 July 1957, Joyce sailed with her squadron for duty in the Pacific and, via the Dominican Republic, Panama, and San Diego, arrived Pearl Harbor 18 August. Following 6 weeks of training, she commenced radar picket and ASW patrols from Pearl Harbor to Midway Atoll and the Marshall Islands. She departed Pearl 13 May 1958 and sailed for Eniwetok Atoll where she conducted search and rescue operations at the Eniwetok Proving Grounds Area. Returning to Pearl Harbor 17 June, she resumed her picket patrols until 16 March 1960 when she set sail for the West Coast.

== Final decommissioning ==
Arriving Long Beach, California, 22 March, she entered the Long Beach Naval Shipyard for inactivation overhaul. Joyce decommissioned 17 June 1960 and was assigned to the Long Beach Group, U.S. Pacific Fleet Reserve. Joyce later transferred to the San Diego, California, Group, where she remained until she was sold for scrapping 11 September 1973.

== The Books ==
In the spring of 2016, Berkley/Caliber, and imprint of Penguin Random House, published Randall Peffer's book Where Divers Dare: The Hunt for the Last U-boat about the battle between USS Joyce, and U-550, the divers' discovery of the wreck of "550" and the extraordinary friendships that resulted between the German survivors and their American rescuer.

In 2017 Lyons Press published Never to Return by Randall Peffer and Col. Robert Nersasian. Through the use of extensive interviews with survivors of "Leopold," "Joyce," and the German submarine "255," the book tells the story of the battle between "Leopold" and "255" and the struggles of the 28 men who survived. The book also resolves unanswered questions about why it took "Joyce" so long to begin rescuing the crew of "Leopold" from the icy water. Col. Nersasian's brother Sparky was one of the 28 survivors.

== Awards ==
Joyce received one battle star for World War II service.
