= T3 tanker =

Class of large tanker ships

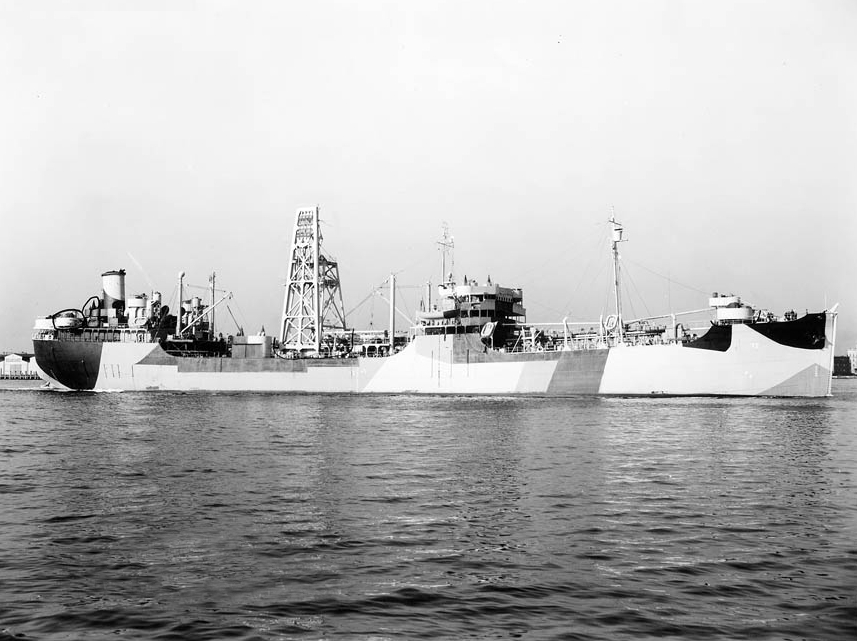
USS Niobrara, a T3-S-A1 tanker

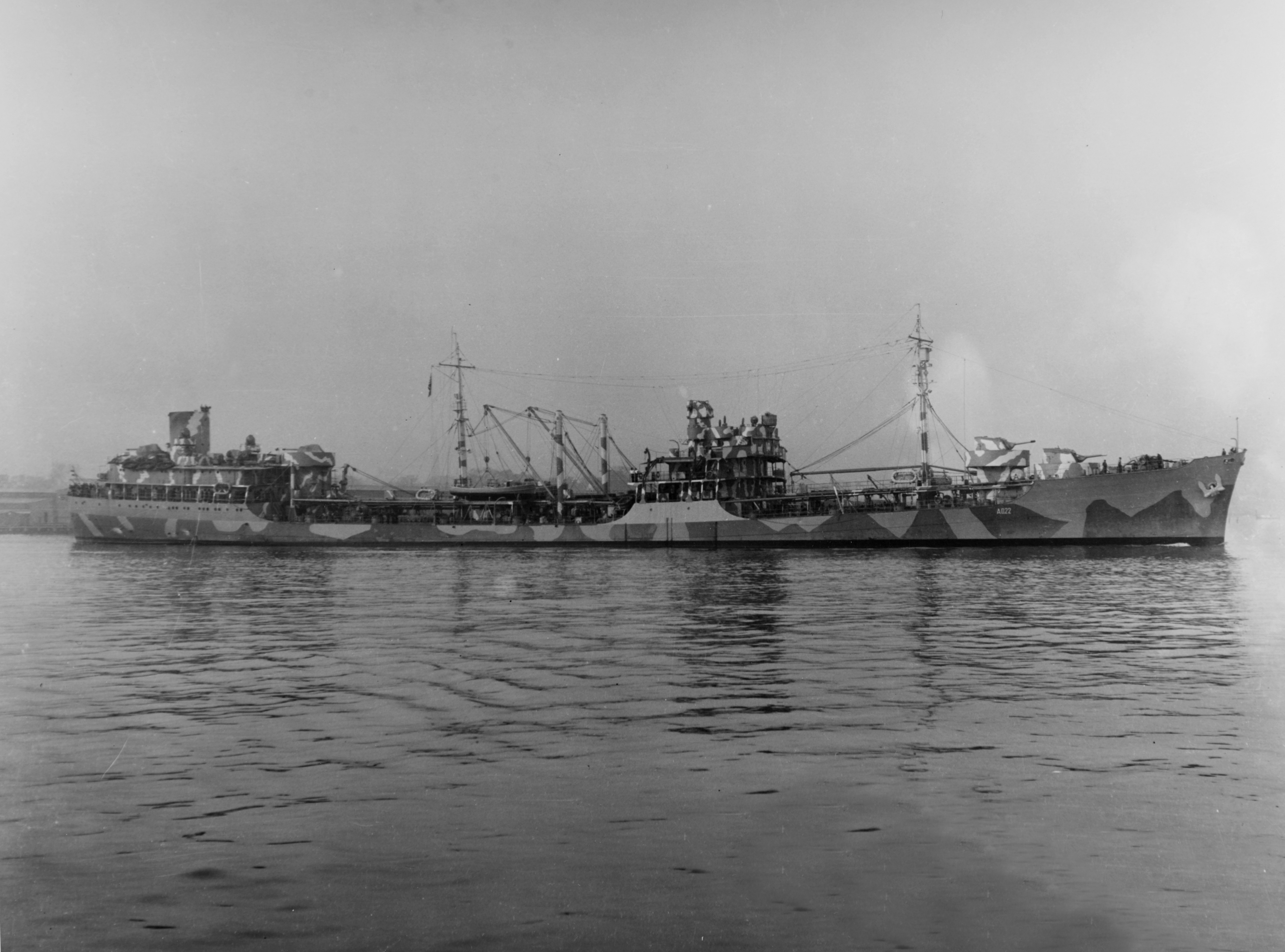
USS Cimarron, a T3-S2-A1 tanker, lead ship of the class in February 1942

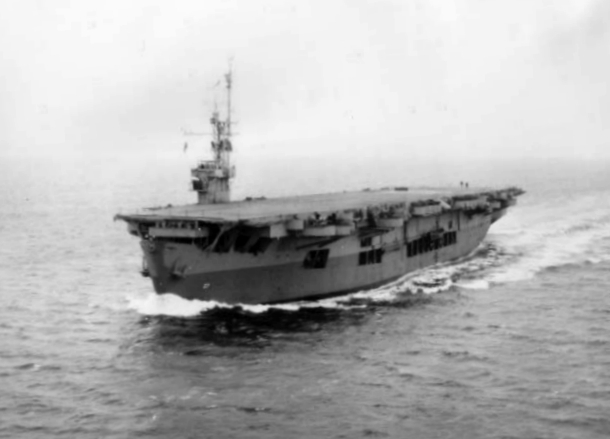
USS Suwannee a T3 tanker converted to an escort carrier, underway, after repairs from the kamikaze attacks of October 1944

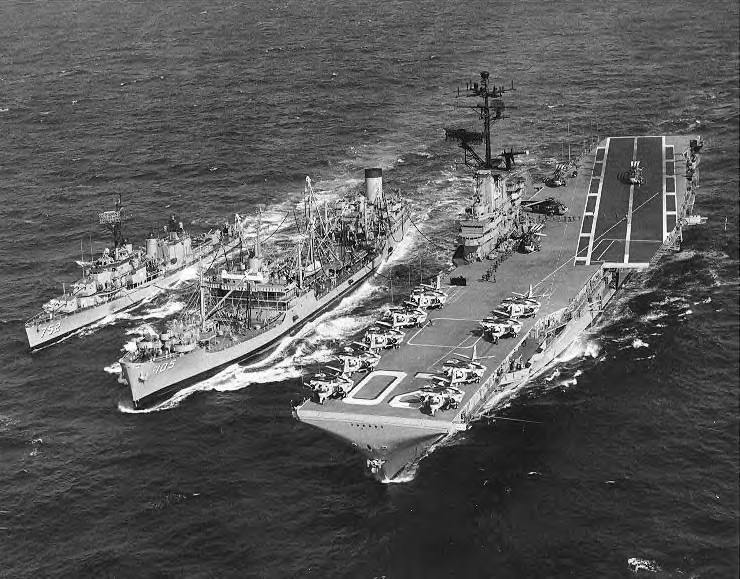
Mispillion (middle) a T3-S2-A3 tanker, fueling USS Bennington and USS Alfred A. Cunningham in 1963

The T3 tanker, or T3, is a type of large, seaworthy tanker ship produced in the United States from the late 1930s onward. This was one of many general types of ship ordered by the U.S. Maritime Commission, which was established in 1936 to facilitate the expansion of the U.S. Merchant Marine as war began to look imminent. The T3 ships were built in large numbers during World War II, and continued to be built afterward. They were used by both military and civilian operators to transport fuel oil, gasoline, diesel fuel, black (crude) oil, and assorted chemicals. The T3 tanker classification is still applied to ships today.

== Design ==
T3 tankers are defined as being between 500 and 550 feet (152 and 168 m) in length and have a full load displacement of about 24,830 tons. Different variants could carry from 113,800 to 200,000 barrels (18,090 to 31,800 m^{3}) of oil. at a maximum sustained speed of 15 to 18 knots (28 to 33 km/h; 17 to 21 mph). Post-war a number of T3s were enlarged through the insertion of a new section of hull amidships ("jumboized"); even though this lengthened them past the size limits that otherwise defined the T3 type (ending up 644 feet/196 m long), ships so enlarged nonetheless retained their T3 classification. In U.S. Navy service tankers are classified as Type AO (auxiliary, oiler) ships; this overall type includes several defined subtypes, including AOG, for gasoline tankers.

Most of the T3 ships were built for private companies and named by those firms. T3 tankers built for or purchased by the US Navy were named or renamed after rivers and lakes bearing Native Americans names that are located in oil-producing parts of the country. T3 tankers were operated during World War II by the US Navy, the War Shipping Administration (which allocated them to other agencies, as needed), and private companies.

T3s carried emergency life rafts on the boat deck. They were equipped with cargo booms, used to handle both cargo (limited quantities of which could be carried along with their normal liquid cargo) and the piping used to load and unload fuel. During wartime, the T3 ships were armed for protection with deck guns, mainly for anti-aircraft purposes. A typical ship carried one single 3-inch (76 mm)/50 caliber dual-purpose gun, two 40 mm (1.6 in) guns and three single 20 mm (0.8 in) cannons. T3 ships normally carried 304 crew members in wartime, run down to c. 81 post-war. If operating as a United States Merchant Marine ship, the crew would be a mix of civilian Merchant Marine sailors and US Navy Armed Guards to man the guns.

The World War II T3-class tankers were considered large for their day, but are small compared to modern oil tankers; among "supertankers", the very large crude carrier is over 200,000 metric tons, and the ultra large crude carrier is over 300,000 metric tons.

The attack on Pearl Harbor brought up an urgent need for aircraft carriers. This led to the conversion of four T3-sized tankers (not actually designated as such; these were Cimarron-class vessels, around whose specification the T3 type was later defined) being converted to escort carriers of the Sangamon class. In 1944-45 a second class of generally similar vessels was ordered as the Commencement Bay class. The T3 tanker's size and speed made it particularly useful as an escort carrier.

== Designs ==
T3 tanker design characteristics
Design & class	Propulsion	Power	Speed (max)	Length × beam × draft	Gross register tonnage	Tankage
T3-S-A1 tanker, Chiwawa-class oiler	2 × steam turbine, single screw	7,700 shp (5,700 kW)	15 kn (28 km/h)	501 ft × 68 ft × 29.6 ft (152.7 m × 20.7 m × 9.0 m)	9,880	133,800 bbl (21,270 m^{3})
T3-S2-A1 tanker, Cimarron-class oiler	4 × turbine, twin screws	13,500 shp (10,100 kW)	18 kn (33 km/h)	553 ft × 75 ft × 32 ft (168.6 m × 22.9 m × 9.8 m)	11,335	146,000 bbl (23,200 m^{3})
T3-S2-A3 tanker, Ashtabula class	geared turbines, twin screws	13,500 shp (10,100 kW)	18.3 kn (33.9 km/h)	553 ft × 75 ft × 32 ft (168.6 m × 22.9 m × 9.8 m)	7,423	146,000 bbl (23,200 m^{3})
T3-S2-A3 "jumboized"				644 ft × 75 ft × 36 ft (196 m × 23 m × 11 m)	12,840	
T3-S-AZ1 tanker	5-cylinder two-cycle oil engine, single screw	7,500 shp (5,600 kW)	15.5 kn (28.7 km/h)	547 ft × 70 ft (167 m × 21 m)	11,401	
T3-S-B tanker	2 × steam turbines, single screw	7,700 shp (5,700 kW)	14 kn (26 km/h)	515.9 ft × 70 ft (157.2 m × 21.3 m)	11,016	140,000 bbl (22,000 m^{3})

- T3-S-A1 tanker: Despite the confusing T3 designation, the T3-S-A1s built by Bethlehem Sparrows Point for Standard Oil of New Jersey were identical to the original T2 tankers except for having less-powerful engines. 25 of this design were ordered by the Maritime Commission, of which 5 became US Navy oilers as the Chiwawa-class oiler. Built by Bethlehem Steel in Sparrows Point, Maryland. (1939 design was a MC-N).
- T3-S2-A1 tanker: A total of 17 were completed by: Bethlehem Steel Company, Sparrows Point, Maryland; Federal SB & DD Co. of Kearny, New Jersey; Newport News SB & DD Co. of Newport News, Virginia; and Sun SB & DD Co. of Chester, Pennsylvania. They were first commissioned by the US Navy in 1943 as the Cimarron-class oiler, with some converted to escort carriers (CVE). They had a crew of 304 and a range of 12,100 nautical miles (22,400 km; 13,900 mi). Armaments for AO-22 through 33 consisted of: 4 × 5-inch/38 caliber guns, 4 × twin 40 mm gun mounts and 4 × twin 20 mm gun mounts. AO-51 and later were armed with: 1 × 5-inch/38 caliber gun, 4 × 3-inch/50 caliber guns, 4 × twin 40 mm gun mounts and 4 × twin 20 mm gun mounts.
- T3-S2-A3 tanker: Most of these tankers were "jumboized" in 1964–1965, extending the length from 553 to 644 feet (169 to 196 m), consequently increasing the capacity, tonnage and draft. Jumboized Cimarron-class oilers were reclassed as Ashtabula-class oilers. Crew: 304 (US Navy) or 108 (civilians and US Navy guards). Armament: 1 × 5-inch/38-caliber gun, 4 × 3-inch/50-caliber guns, 4 × twin 40 mm antiaircraft guns and 4 × twin 20 mm antiaircraft guns. Ships in class: Ashtabula, Mispillion, Navasota, Passumpsic, Pawcatuck and Waccamaw. Built by Sun Shipbuilding & Drydock Co.
- T3-S-AZ1 tanker: Only one in class: Brandywine, built by Sun Ship, launched in August 1943.
- T3-S-B tanker: Crew: 50 and 31 US Navy Armed Guards. Armament: 1 × 5-inch (130 mm) gun, 1 × 3-inch (76 mm) gun and 20 mm guns, commissioned 1943. Two sub classes: T3-S-BF1 and T3-S-BZ1:
  - T3-S-BF1 Five built in 1943 and 1944: first in class Pan-Pennsylvania, Bulklube, Bulkfuel, Bulkcrude and Bulkero by Welding Shipyards Inc. in Norfolk, Virginia.
  - T3-S-BZ1 Completed three ships: SS Phoenix, SS Nashbulk and SS Amtank. Built in 1943 and 1944 by Welding Shipyards Inc. in Norfolk, Virginia.

== Notable incidents ==
- SS Pan-Pennsylvania, a Type T3-S-BF1 tanker, on 16 April 1944 was sunk off Nantucket by a torpedo from U-boat U-550 commanded by Klaus Hänert. Pan-Pennsylvania was steaming from New York Harbor on the afternoon of 15 April 1944 as part of convoy CU-21, going to England with 140,000 barrels (22,000 m^{3}) of 80-octane aviation fuel. She had a crew of 50 men and 31 members of the Naval Armed Guard. The 28 merchant ships of CU-21 were accompanied by Escort Flotilla 21.5, which consisted of six destroyer escorts.
- USS Mississinewa, a T3-S2-A1 tanker, on 20 November 1944 was sunk near Ulithi Island after being hit by a Japanese Kaiten manned torpedo.
- USS Shabonee, a T3-S-A1 tanker, was sold to the US Navy and renamed USS Escalante (AO-70). In 1947 she was sold and renamed SS George MacDonald. On 30 June 1960 she sank 165 miles (266 km) east of Savannah, Georgia after an engine fire on 27 June.
- Lake Charles, a T3-S-A1 renamed Capri, ran aground on Molasses Reef, Florida (25.07 N, 80.22 W) on 27 April 1963. She was a total loss.
- Brandywine, a T2-SE-A1 renamed Atlantic Sun, was damaged in 1962 and scrapped.
- Phoenix, a T3-S-BZ1, first in her class, was badly damaged in a collision with Pan Mass on 6 June 1953, resulting in a total loss.

== See also ==
- T1 tanker the smallest in the T class
- T2 tanker the middle-sized and most-produced T class
- History of the oil tanker
- Victory ships
- Liberty ship
- Type C1 ship
- Type C2 ship
- Type C3 ship
- Type R ship
- United States Merchant Marine Academy
- United States Navy oiler
- List of auxiliaries of the United States Navy
