= John L. Notter =

American financier and developer born 1935

- Born: 1935 (age 90–91); Zurich, Switzerland
- Education: California State University, Los Angeles
- Occupation: Financier

John L. Notter (born 1935) is an American financier and developer who manages and has substantial interests in a wide variety of companies, including Westlake Properties, Inc., and Sailview Associates, Inc., of Westlake Village, California; and Clark Road Development, LLC and Sherwood Holdings LTD. located in Sarasota, Florida.

In addition, Notter served as a member of the Board of Directors of Hilton Hotels Corporation and was the chairman of the Audit Committee. He is currently a member of the Board of Directors of the Ludwig Institute for Cancer Research, after serving as its chair for many years. He is also a member of the Board of Directors for Conrad N. Hilton Foundation and chairman of its Finance and Investment Committee.

== Early life ==
Born 1935 in Zurich, Switzerland, Notter immigrated with his family to the United States in 1941 at age 9 where he was raised on the East Coast. After receiving an honorable discharge from the armed services, Notter went on to attend and graduate from Pasadena City College, then attended and graduated from California State University, Los Angeles.

== Career ==
Notter spent 15 years as the operating head of the D.K. Ludwig Group, a large network of companies around the world with major interests in real estate, hotels, shipping, insurance, agriculture, and mining. He also served as chairman of American-Hawaiian Steamship Company, the developer of a major master-planned residential and commercial development north of Los Angeles in Westlake Village, California, which continues to serve as an example of master-planned communities throughout the country.

Additionally, Notter has served as chairman of the Board for Princess Hotels International, Inc., which developed, owned, and operated hotels in Acapulco, Southampton, Bermuda, Bahamas and the United States. He concurrently served as president of Universe Tankships, Inc., and National Bulk Carriers, Inc., one of the world’s largest providers of tankers and shipping services throughout the world. Notter served on the Board of Directors of Financiere Credit Suisse First Boston in Zurich, Swiss American Corporation and Pepcom, a division of Suntory Industries of Japan, and York-Hanover, Ltd. in the U.S. and Canada. Additionally, he was a member of the Advisory Board of Chemical Bank of New York, Columbia University, and is on the board of the Frank W. Jobe Foundation in Los Angeles.

== Awards ==
On May 7, 2010, Notter was presented the Celebration of Philanthropy award for his efforts to help people through his leadership with the Ludwig Institute for Cancer Research and the Conrad N. Hilton Foundation.
