= HMAS Kurumba =

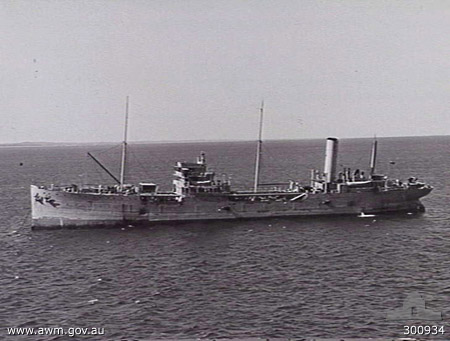
- HMAS Kurumba in 1941

History

Australia (RAN)
- Builder: Swan Hunter and Wigham Richardson, Ltd, Wallsend-on-Tyne
- Laid down: 14 August 1914
- Launched: 14 September 1916
- Commissioned: 7 December 1916
- Decommissioned: July 1946
- Fate: Broken up in 1966

General characteristics
- Displacement: 2977 gross tons (2548 net)
- Length: 378 ft (115 m) (overall)
- Beam: 45 ft 6 in (13.87 m)
- Draught: 23 ft 3 in (7.09 m) (loaded)
- Propulsion: Steam triple expansion (2 sets)
- Speed: 10 knots (19 km/h)
- Complement: 65
- Armament: Original: 1 × 4-inch BL gun, 2 × 6-pounder guns; World War II: 1 × 4-inch QF gun, 4 × machine guns

HMAS Kurumba was an oil tanker operated by the Royal Australian Navy (RAN) from 1919 to 1946.

Kurumba was built by Swan Hunter & Wigham Richardson, Wallsend for the RAN and was launched on 14 September 1916. Commissioned on 7 December 1916 as part of the Royal Navy's Royal Fleet Auxiliary and served until 11 March 1919 when she was transferred to the Royal Australian Fleet Auxiliary and arrived in Australia in July. Kurumba operated in Australian and South-East Asia waters until being paid off to reserve on 4 June 1928.

Kurumba was reactivated on 4 September 1939 and served in Australian waters and the South West Pacific Area during World War II. Following the war she was taken out of service in July 1946 and was sold to Artemis Maritime Co Inc, Panama in January 1948 and she was renamed Angeliki. In 1955, she was sold to Pappas Eleftheriades and renamed Evangelos. She was broken up at Castellón de la Plana in 1966.
