= USS Peterson (DE-152) =

1943 Edsall-class destroyer escort

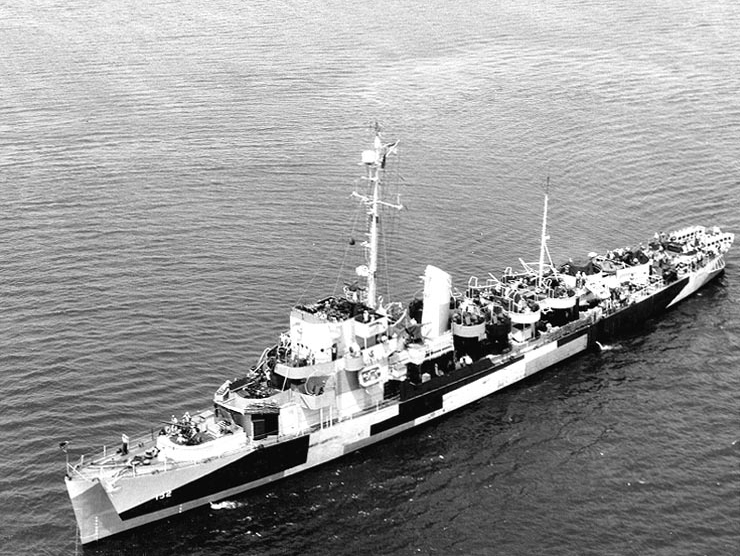
- USS Peterson (DE-152)

History

United States
- Namesake: Oscar V. Peterson
- Builder: Consolidated Steel Corporation, Orange, Texas
- Laid down: 28 February 1943
- Launched: 15 May 1943
- Commissioned: 28 September 1943
- Decommissioned: June 1965
- Stricken: 1 August 1973
- Fate: Sold for scrap in 1974

General characteristics
- Class & type: Edsall-class destroyer escort
- Displacement: 1,253 tons standard; 1,590 tons full load
- Length: 306 feet (93.27 m)
- Beam: 36.58 feet (11.15 m)
- Draft: 10.42 full load feet (3.18 m)
- Propulsion: 4 FM diesel engines, 4 diesel-generators, 6,000 shp (4.5 MW), 2 screws
- Speed: 21 knots (39 km/h)
- Range: 9,100 nmi. at 12 knots; (17,000 km at 22 km/h)
- Complement: 8 officers, 201 enlisted
- Armament: 3 × single 3 in (76 mm)/50 guns; 1 × twin 40 mm AA guns; 8 × single 20 mm AA guns; 1 × triple 21 in (533 mm) torpedo tubes; 8 × depth charge projectors; 1 × depth charge projector (hedgehog); 2 × depth charge tracks

USS Peterson (DE-152) was an Edsall class destroyer escort, the first United States Navy ship so named. This ship was named for Chief Water Tender Oscar V. Peterson (1899–1942), who was awarded the Medal of Honor posthumously for his actions during the Battle of the Coral Sea.

Peterson was laid down 28 February 1943 by Consolidated Steel Corporation, Orange, Texas; launched 15 May 1943; sponsored by Mrs. Lola B. Peterson; and commissioned 29 September 1943.

== World War II service ==
Peterson moved to Galveston, Texas, 6 October 1943 to continue her outfitting, then sailed by way of Algiers, Louisiana to Bermuda for shakedown. She reported to Charleston, South Carolina, for a brief post-shakedown upkeep 22 November, and six days later was en route to New York City, arriving the last day of the month.

Her first voyage between New York and Casablanca, French Morocco, commenced 2 December when Peterson sailed for Norfolk, Virginia to join the main body of a North Africa bound convoy. She returned to New York 18 January 1944.

Peterson then shifted her activity to Northern Europe, making ten voyages to British and French ports. On the first of these voyages, Peterson with the other escorts of Division 22 steamed from New York 1 March to screen a fast oiler convoy to Derry, Northern Ireland. On this voyage a submarine sank Leopold (DE-319).

Peterson arrived with the convoy at Derry and returned to New York 28 March where she was joined by USS Gandy. Departing New York 15 April with an Ireland bound convoy, Peterson was detached the following day to escort two merchant ships, which had collided, back to New York. En route to rejoin the convoy later on the same day, Peterson joined Gandy and USS Joyce in rescuing survivors of the torpedoed Pan Pennsylvania and destroying the attacker. At 13:45 Joyce reported a hot sound contact and the last survivors scrambled on board Peterson just as Joyce dropped a pattern of depth charges. The submarine shot to the surface at 14:00. Gandy opened fire on the U-boat which returned fire until rammed with a glancing blow by Gandy two minutes later. Peterson commenced firing at 14:04 to lay open the conning tower, and as she passed alongside the submarine, fired two shallow-set depth charges at close range from her starboard "K" guns. At 1409 the submarine surrendered and the crew commenced abandoning the sinking boat. Joyce picked up the crew and U-550 slid beneath the waves at 14:30. The three escorts rejoined the convoy and steamed safely to Lisahally, Northern Ireland, returning to New York 12 May 1944.

The sunken German U-boat was found on 23 July 2012 in deep water about 70 nautical miles (130 km; 81 mi) south of Nantucket, Massachusetts.

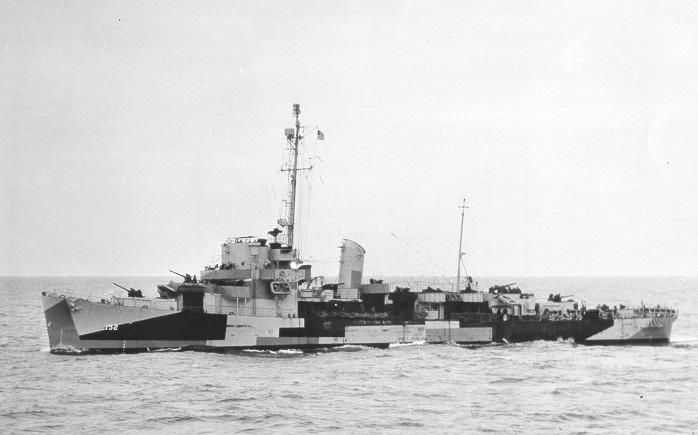
USS Peterson (DE-152)

Peterson made three more convoy voyages to Derry and return. She then made successive voyages from New York to Plymouth, England (6 October–5 November 1944); from New York to Cherbourg, France and Plymouth, England (23 November – 24 December); from New York to Liverpool, England (10 January–9 February 1945); from New York to Le Havre, France and Southampton, England (27 February – 29 March); and from Boston to Greenock, Scotland and Liverpool, England, returning to New York 16 April.

After an overhaul to fit her for extended duty in the Pacific, Peterson departed New York 4 June 1945 with the rest of Escort Division 22 for exercises at Culebra Island, and at Guantanamo Bay, Cuba. She transited the Panama Canal 23 June, called at San Diego for voyage repairs, and arrived Pearl Harbor 16 July. With the end of the war, she reported to Commander Amphibious Group 8 and Commander Transport Squadron 18 for duty.

Peterson departed Pearl Harbor the last day of August 1945 with an LST convoy. Calling at Saipan en route, the convoy arrived off Wakayama, Japan, 27 September and Peterson assumed patrol in the Inland Sea until 29 October. On that day she set course for the United States, calling at Pearl Harbor, and arriving San Diego 17 November. She shifted to San Pedro the following day. She got underway for the east coast, transiting the Panama Canal 6 December. Three days later off the coast of Florida, a PBM–3D (Mariner) landed close aboard to ask assistance. Peterson towed the disabled plane to Ponce de Leon Inlet where a crash boat from New Smyrna took over the tow. She then continued up the coast to Charleston, South Carolina, arriving 10 December 1945.

Peterson sailed for Jacksonville, Florida, 14 January 1946, arriving the following day to commence her inactivation. She was placed out of commission in reserve at Green Cove Springs, Florida, 1 May 1946. During her first period of commissioning, Peterson was crewed by the U.S. Coast Guard. During her second commissioning period, she was crewed by the U.S. Navy.

== Post-war service ==
Peterson recommissioned in the Boston Naval Shipyard, 2 May 1952. Peterson spent the next five years operating with Escort Squadron 10 off the east coast of the United States, from Newport, Rhode Island, to Key West, Florida, and in the Caribbean Sea. During these years she saw considerable duty as Fleet Sonar Schoolship at Key West. In July 1953 she visited Bergen, Norway, and Copenhagen, Denmark. In October 1954 she conducted simulated convoy escort exercises to waters off Hamilton Inlet, Labrador. In July 1955 she cruised to Edinburgh, Scotland, and Copenhagen. In May 1957 while in the Caribbean she tracked Jupiter missiles fired from Cape Canaveral and in August played a vital role in the first successful recovery of a missile nose cone, attaching a buoy-float to the nose cone flotation unit.

Peterson put to sea 3 September 1957 with fifteen other warships and eleven auxiliary vessels of Task Force 88.1, bound for Portland, England. She reached Portland 14 September and was underway the next day for strenuous North Atlantic Treaty Organization maneuvers. She conducted independent reconnaissance patrol off Sweden until 19 September when she was joined by Huse (DE-145), two Canadian destroyers and a Dutch cruiser, for patrol off southern Sweden, and then to Frederikshaven, Denmark, where she arrived 23 September. She departed that port in company with Huse the next day for maneuvers in the North Sea and reached Le Havre, France, 30 September. After a visit to Dunkirk, France, she returned to Newport 21 October.

Peterson became a unit of the newly created Destroyer Escort Squadron Twelve 1 November and arrived at Key West 24 November for another tour of service as schoolship for the Fleet Sonar School. She departed Key West 23 January 1958 for a Caribbean training cruise with her squadron. In May Peterson assisted in the first recovery of a full-size missile nose cone that had penetrated the atmosphere. She resumed her Fleet Sonar schoolship duty at Key West 22 May 1958 and got underway 8 August for competitive exercises off Guantanamo Bay, Cuba. She arrived Kingston, Jamaica 14 August 1958 and put to sea within fifteen hours on an emergency mercy mission to deliver badly needed water to a rescue tug tending a Greek freighter aground about 150 miles south of Kingston.

Peterson resumed schoolship duties at Key West 18 August 1958 and put to sea 3 January 1959 for waters off the north coast of Cuba, standing by with other ships of her task group in the event American citizens in Havana might need her protection. She returned to Key West 6 January and continued services for the Fleet Sonar School. She departed 24 August to participate in "Operation Deep Freeze 60." She passed through the Panama Canal and arrived Dunedin, New Zealand, 22 September. A unit of Task Force 43, she got underway six days later and steamed to Ocean Weather Station (latitude 60 degrees south; longitude 170 degrees east). On that station midway between Antarctica and New Zealand, she acted as a weather communications and rescue ship for supply flights from Christchurch to the southernmost continent.

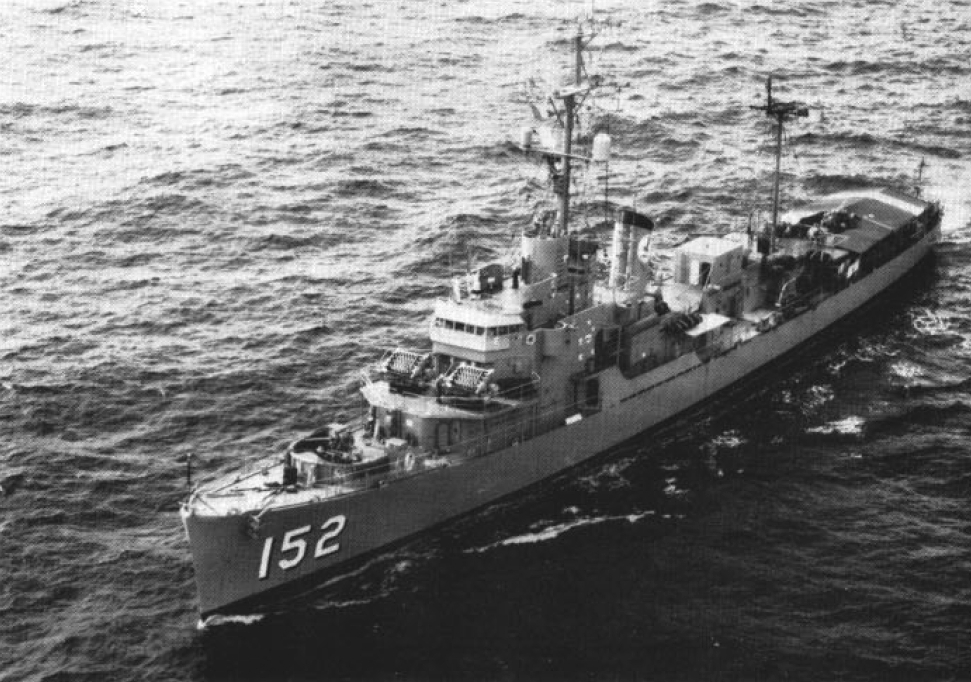
Peterson, circa 1964.

From July 1961 to December 1963 Peterson served principally as a training ship for students of the U.S. Fleet Sonar School, Key West, Florida. In April 1962 she visited Guantanamo Bay, Cuba, and Jamaica. During the second half of 1962 Peterson was a movie star, playing the role of the Japanese destroyer that rammed and sank PT–109. On 22 October 1962 Peterson suddenly found herself on a full war-time footing and bound full speed for quarantine duty off the Cuban coast during the Cuban Missile Crisis. She was ordered home in time for Christmas. Peterson visited Guantanamo Bay for training in January and July 1963.

January 1964 found Peterson patrolling the coasts of Colombia and Venezuela. She returned to Key West 23 February. For the balance of the year she operated out of Key West, mainly as Fleet Sonar Schoolship.

In June 1965 the Peterson was decommissioned for the last time in Norfolk, Virginia and was laid to rest in the inactive reserve fleet in Portsmouth, Virginia. Disposed of, sold by Defense Reutilization and Marketing Service (DRMS) for scrapping, June 1974.

== Awards ==
Peterson received one battle star for World War II service. During peace time she at one time held seven separate Battle Efficiency "E"s.
