= USS Gandy =

Cannon-class destroyer escort

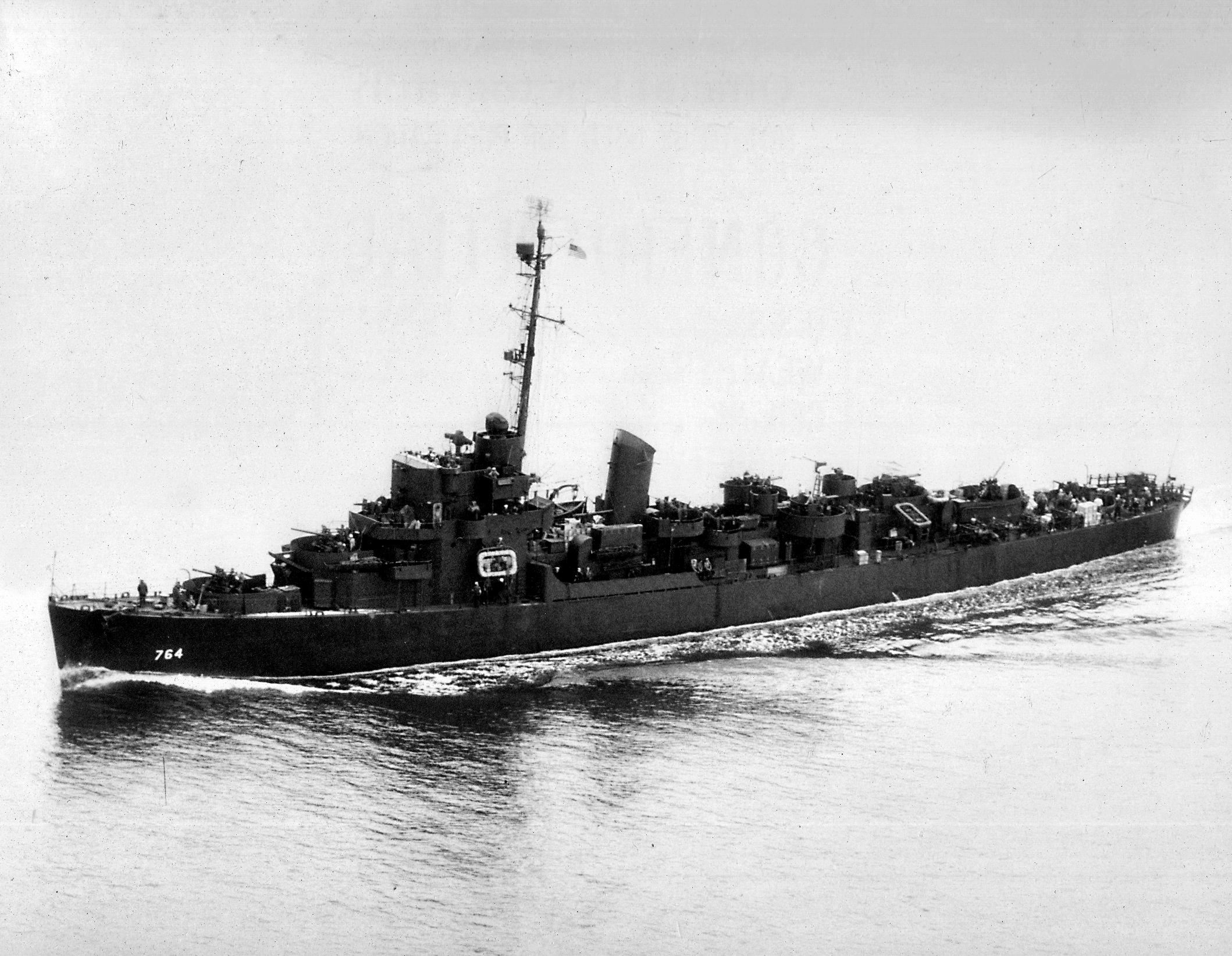

History

United States
- Name: USS Gandy
- Namesake: Andrew Jackson Gandy
- Builder: Tampa Shipbuilding Company, Tampa, Florida
- Laid down: 1 March 1943
- Launched: 12 December 1943
- Commissioned: 7 February 1944
- Decommissioned: 17 June 1946
- Stricken: 26 March 1951
- Honors and awards: 1 battle star (World War II)
- Fate: Transferred to Italy, 10 January 1951

History

Italy
- Name: Altair (F 591)
- Acquired: 10 January 1951
- Stricken: 1971
- Fate: Sunk as target ship, 1971

General characteristics
- Class & type: Cannon-class destroyer escort
- Displacement: 1,240 long tons (1,260 t) standard; 1,620 long tons (1,646 t) full
- Length: 306 ft (93 m) o/a; 300 ft (91 m) w/l
- Beam: 36 ft 10 in (11.23 m)
- Draft: 11 ft 8 in (3.56 m)
- Propulsion: 4 × GM Mod. 16-278A diesel engines with electric drive, 6,000 shp (4,474 kW), 2 screws
- Speed: 21 knots (39 km/h; 24 mph)
- Range: 10,800 nmi (20,000 km) at 12 kn (22 km/h; 14 mph)
- Complement: 15 officers and 201 enlisted
- Armament: 3 × single Mk.22 3"/50 caliber guns; 1 × twin 40 mm Mk.1 AA gun; 8 × 20 mm Mk.4 AA guns; 3 × 21 inch (533 mm) torpedo tubes; 1 × Hedgehog Mk.10 anti-submarine mortar (144 rounds); 8 × Mk.6 depth charge projectors; 2 × Mk.9 depth charge tracks

USS Gandy (DE-764) was a Cannon-class destroyer escort in service with the United States Navy from 1944 to 1946. In 1951, she was transferred to Italy, where she served as Altair (F 591) until she was stricken and sunk as a target in 1971.

== Namesake ==
Andrew Jackson Gandy was born on 20 October 1924 in Chattanooga, Tennessee. While serving on board the cruiser USS San Francisco Seaman Second Class Gandy was killed defending the ship against Japanese torpedo planes during the Battle of Guadalcanal. He was posthumously awarded the Navy Cross.

== History ==
Gandy was launched on 12 December 1943 by the Tampa Shipbuilding Co., Tampa, Florida; sponsored by Miss Ruby Gandy, sister of Seaman Gandy; and commissioned at Tampa on 7 February 1944.

=== United States Navy (1944-1951) ===
==== Battle of the Atlantic ====
Gandy, following shakedown training in Bermuda waters, joined Escort Division 22 at New York. After escorting Yukon (AF-9) to Norfolk, Virginia, she departed New York on 15 April 1944 as part of the escort for fast tanker Convoy CU-21 bound for Northern Ireland. The second day of the voyage at 0806, on 16 April, U-550 torpedoed and sank tanker SS Pan-Pennsylvania. During recovery of survivors by Joyce (DE-317), Gandy and Peterson (DE-152) at 0950, Joyce made sound contact with the U-boat and delivered a depth charge attack. When U-550 surfaced about 600 yards (550 m) on Gandy's starboard bow, Comdr. Sessions ordered "Right full rudder, come to 320, open fire and stand by to ram."

Gandy headed for the submarine's conning tower but the U-boat's deft maneuvers caused the escort destroyer to hit it 30 feet (9 m) from the stern. Gandy hauled clear, silenced the submarine's machine gun battery with a short burst of gunfire, then observed the Germans abandoning ship. Joyce recovered twelve survivors as Gandy, with nearly four feet of her bow strake gone and several plates buckled, assessed her damage. U-550 was shaken by a muffled explosion and sank. Four of Gandy's men were injured in the fight.

Gandy continued with the convoy which reached Lisahally, Northern Ireland, on 26 April 1944. She returned to New York on 12 May and helped escort nine more convoys safely out of New York to Lisahally and Liverpool by 24 May 1945 when she returned from the last of these voyages.

The sunken German U-boat was found on 23 July 2012 in deep water about 70 miles south of Nantucket, Massachusetts.

==== Pacific War ====
After repairs in the New York Naval Shipyard, she sailed on 8 June for brief training in Cuban waters before proceeding to Hawaii. She departed Pearl Harbor on 6 August 1945 en route to the Philippines via the Marshalls and the Carolines, then sailed from Leyte on the 24th in the escort of an occupation force convoy which entered Tokyo Bay on 1 September.

Following the formal signing of the surrender of Japan, the next day she escorted a convoy from Okinawa to Yokohama, Japan, and then departed on 16 November to serve the Philippine Sea Frontier on weather patrol between Manila, Samar, and Manicani. She departed Samar on 1 February 1946 and reached Norfolk, Virginia, via Hawaii, San Pedro, California, and the Panama Canal, on 26 March 1946.

== Altair (F 591) ==
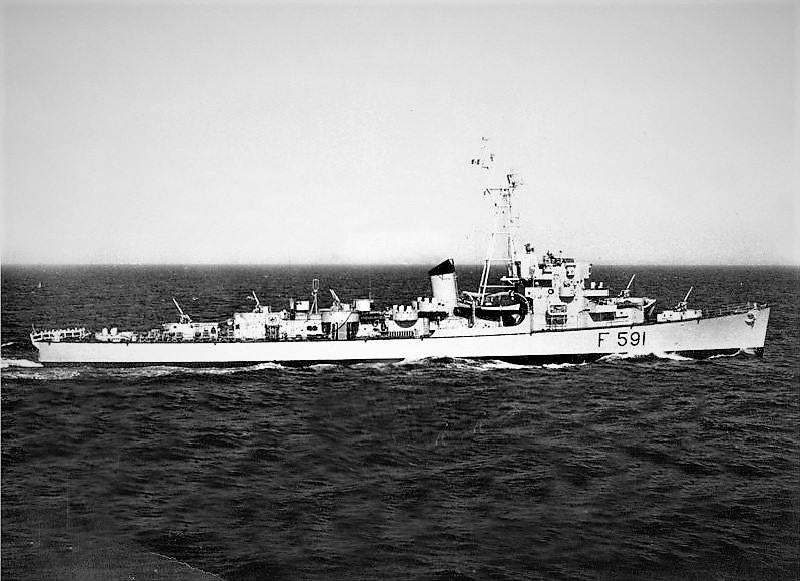
The frigate Altair (F 591) in navigation

Gandy decommissioned at Green Cove Springs, Florida, on 17 June 1946. She was in reserve status until 10 January 1951 when she was transferred to Italy under the Military Assistance Program. She served the Italian Navy under the name of Altair (F 591) until she was stricken and sunk as a target in 1971.

== Awards ==
Gandy received one battle star for service in World War II.
