= German submarine U-550 =

German World War II submarine

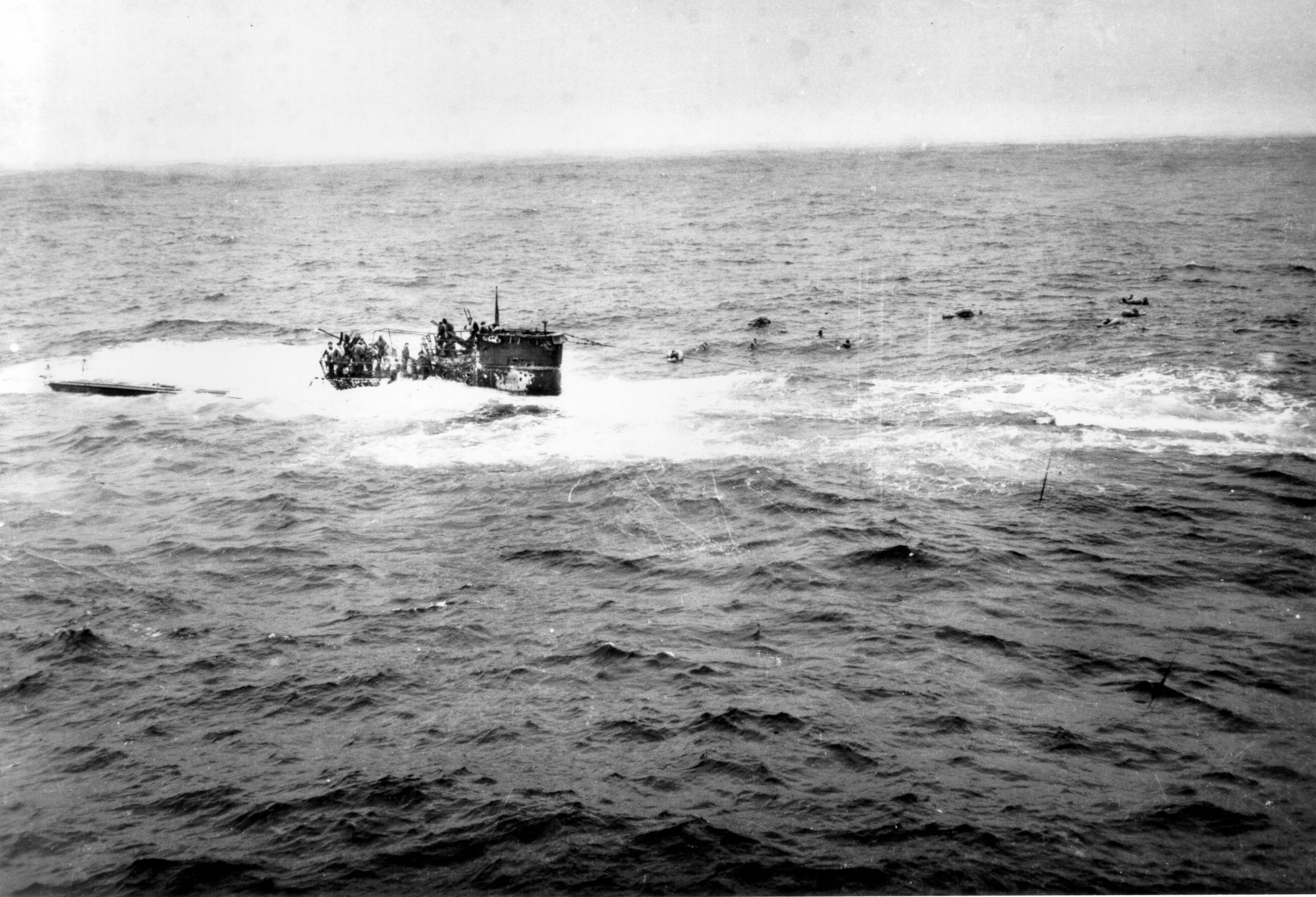
- Crewmen of U-550 abandon ship after being depth charged, rammed and shelled

History

Nazi Germany
- Name: U-550
- Ordered: 5 June 1941
- Builder: Deutsche Werft, Hamburg
- Yard number: 371
- Laid down: 2 October 1942
- Launched: 12 May 1943
- Commissioned: 28 July 1943
- Fate: Sunk on 16 April 1944

General characteristics
- Class & type: Type IXC/40 submarine
- Displacement: 1,144 t (1,126 long tons) surfaced; 1,257 t (1,237 long tons) submerged
- Length: 76.76 m (251 ft 10 in) o/a; 58.75 m (192 ft 9 in) pressure hull
- Beam: 6.86 m (22 ft 6 in) o/a; 4.44 m (14 ft 7 in) pressure hull
- Height: 9.60 m (31 ft 6 in)
- Draught: 4.67 m (15 ft 4 in)
- Installed power: 4,400 PS (3,200 kW; 4,300 bhp) (diesels); 1,000 PS (740 kW; 990 shp) (electric)
- Propulsion: 2 shafts; 2 × diesel engines; 2 × electric motors
- Speed: 18.3 knots (33.9 km/h; 21.1 mph) surfaced; 7.3 knots (13.5 km/h; 8.4 mph) submerged
- Range: 13,850 nmi (25,650 km; 15,940 mi) at 10 knots (19 km/h; 12 mph) surfaced; 63 nmi (117 km; 72 mi) at 4 knots (7.4 km/h; 4.6 mph) submerged
- Test depth: 230 m (750 ft)
- Complement: 4 officers, 44 enlisted
- Armament: 6 × torpedo tubes (4 bow, 2 stern); 22 × 53.3 cm (21 in) torpedoes; 1 × 10.5 cm (4.1 in) SK C/32 deck gun (180 rounds); 1 × 3.7 cm (1.5 in) SK C/30 AA gun; 1 × twin 2 cm FlaK 30 AA guns

Service record
- Part of: 4th U-boat Flotilla; 28 July 1943 – 31 January 1944; 10th U-boat Flotilla; 1 February – 16 April 1944
- Identification codes: M 53 473
- Commanders: Kptlt. Klaus Hänert; 28 July 1943 – 16 April 1944
- Operations: 1 patrol: 6 February – 16 April 1944
- Victories: 1 merchant ship sunk (11,017 GRT)

German submarine U-550 was a Type IXC/40 German Navy U-boat built during World War II. She was laid down on 2 October 1942 by Deutsche Werft in Hamburg as yard number 371, launched on 12 May 1943 and commissioned on 28 July under the command of Kapitänleutnant Klaus Hänert.

== Design ==
German Type IXC/40 submarines were slightly larger than the original Type IXCs. U-550 had a displacement of 1,144 tonnes (1,126 long tons) when at the surface and 1,257 tonnes (1,237 long tons) while submerged. The U-boat had a total length of 76.76 m (251 ft 10 in), a pressure hull length of 58.75 m (192 ft 9 in), a beam of 6.86 m (22 ft 6 in), a height of 9.60 m (31 ft 6 in), and a draught of 4.67 m (15 ft 4 in). The submarine was powered by two MAN M 9 V 40/46 supercharged four-stroke, nine-cylinder diesel engines producing a total of 4,400 metric horsepower (3,240 kW; 4,340 shp) for use while surfaced, two Siemens-Schuckert 2 GU 345/34 double-acting electric motors producing a total of 1,000 shaft horsepower (1,010 PS; 750 kW) for use while submerged. She had two shafts and two 1.92 m (6 ft) propellers. The boat was capable of operating at depths of up to 230 metres (750 ft).

The submarine had a maximum surface speed of 18.3 knots (33.9 km/h; 21.1 mph) and a maximum submerged speed of 7.3 knots (13.5 km/h; 8.4 mph). When submerged, the boat could operate for 63 nautical miles (117 km; 72 mi) at 4 knots (7.4 km/h; 4.6 mph); when surfaced, she could travel 13,850 nautical miles (25,650 km; 15,940 mi) at 10 knots (19 km/h; 12 mph). U-550 was fitted with six 53.3 cm (21 in) torpedo tubes (four fitted at the bow and two at the stern), 22 torpedoes, one 10.5 cm (4.13 in) SK C/32 naval gun, 180 rounds, and a 3.7 cm (1.5 in) SK C/30 as well as a 2 cm (0.79 in) C/30 anti-aircraft gun. The boat had a complement of forty-eight.

== Service history ==
After training with the 4th U-boat Flotilla, she was assigned to the 10th U-boat Flotilla on 1 February 1944 in Lorient in occupied France.

=== Patrol ===
She sailed from Kiel on 6 February 1944, heading for the North Atlantic, via the gap between Iceland and the Faroe Islands and conducted weather reporting duties before sailing for Newfoundland and subsequently the northeast coast of the United States. On 22 February the boat was unsuccessfully attacked south of Iceland by a Canso flying boat of No. 162 Squadron RCAF. However, two members of the U-boat's crew were killed.

=== Loss ===
On 16 April 1944, south of Nantucket Island, she located convoy CU 21, bound for Great Britain from New York City. The Pan Pennsylvania, one of the largest tankers in the world, was unwisely straggling behind the convoy; U-550 torpedoed her. The ship quickly caught fire and began to sink. As the vessel settled, the submerged U-boat maneuvered underneath her hull in an effort to hide from the inevitable counterattack by the convoy's escorts.

Convoy CU-21 was escorted by Escort Division 22, consisting of Coast Guard-crewed destroyer escorts reinforced by one Navy DE, USS Gandy, which took the place of USS Leopold, which had been lost in action the previous month. The escort division's flagship, USS Joyce and USS Peterson rescued the tanker's surviving crew, while the Joyce detected the U-boat on sonar as the Germans attempted to escape after hiding beneath the sinking tanker. U-550's engineering officer later said, "We waited for your ship to leave; soon we could hear nothing so we thought the escort vessels had gone; but as soon as we started to move – bang!" The Joyce delivered a depth-charge pattern that bracketed the submerged submarine. The depth charges were so well placed, a German reported, that one actually bounced off the U-boat's deck before it exploded.

According to eyewitness accounts cited in Randall Peffer's book Where Divers Dare: The Hunt for the Last U-boat, the attack severely damaged U-550 and forced her to the surface. Joyce, Peterson and Gandy circled around the submarine, firing at her. Gandy rammed U-550 abaft the conning tower and Peterson dropped two depth charges which exploded near the U-boat's hull. Two men in the U-boat's tower were killed.

Meanwhile, the U-boat captain Klaus Hänert tried to reach the observation deck with a surrender flag, but he was wounded by the American shells and fell back down into the U-boat's control room. Eventually, someone aboard the submarine fired a white flare from the tower hatch.

The captain of the USS Joyce, Robert Wilcox, took the flare as a sign of distress and surrender and called a cease fire. USS Gandy and USS Peterson ceased firing, too. The U-boat's crew scrambled on deck to abandon their sinking vessel. About 40 of the Germans entered the 44-degree water and tried to swim to USS Peterson, but the men were not picked up. Joyce rescued 13 of U-550's crew, including the captain Klaus Hänert, engineer Hugo Renzmann and doctor Friedrich Torge. One of the saved German seamen later died from wounds received during the firefight. Joyce delivered the prisoners of war as well as the Pan Pennsylvania survivors to the authorities in Ireland.

== Men in the Water ==
There is a grisly postscript to the sinking of U-550. According to the Eastern Sea Frontier's War Diary account of the sinking.

At 15:15 on 5 May 1944, the Coastal Picket Patrol CGR-3082 recovered a body from the sea at 39°51′N 71°58′W, about 93 nmi (172 km; 107 mi) ESE of Ambrose. The body was clothed in a German-type life jacket. From the markings on his clothing it was possible that the man's name was "Zube". A German escape lung was found near his body as well. An autopsy performed on the body indicated that the individual died only five days before his remains were discovered – U-550 had been sunk on 16 April, the corpse was found 19 days later.

Two other bodies were subsequently found. The first, picked up by another picket boat, CGR-1989, at 17:30 on 11 May, was fully clothed, had an escape lung and life jacket on. He was found in a rubber raft. Identification marks indicated the man was a German sailor named Wilhelm Flade, aged about 17. The body was transferred from CGR-1989 to CGR-1338 on the morning of 12 May 1944 and was brought to Tompkinsville on Staten Island.

On 16 May a third body was sighted and picked up by USS SC-630. It was stated that the uniform and insignia indicated the victim had been a German crewman, although he carried no identification; he had been in the water more than 18 days.

== Discovery ==
The wreck of U-550 was discovered on 23 July 2012. It lay off the coast of Massachusetts in over 300 feet of water about 70 nautical miles (130 km; 81 mi) south of Nantucket. A team of six divers, led by Joe Mazraani, located the wreck using side-scan sonar after a multi-year search.

Subsequent to the discovery, the divers received emails, letters and phone calls from veterans and the families of veterans involved in the battle who were looking for closure and hoping to set the record straight. The divers interviewed living veterans of the tanker Pan Pennsylvania and the US destroyer escorts. Eventually, the divers traveled to Germany and met with two of the last living survivors of U-550 as well as the families of the submarine's captain and doctor. What the divers learned was that the survivors of U-550 had become friends following the war with the captain of the Joyce, Robert Wilcox, who saved their lives.

During the search for U-550 the team located a large target which diving confirmed to be the wreck of the stern of Pan Pennsylvania, previously believed to have sunk whole approximately 20 nautical miles (37 kilometres; 23 miles) from the scene of battle in 1944. They recovered a breakfast plate from the wreck and presented it to the ship's chief radio officer Mort Raphelson on the 70th anniversary of the battle. The plate resembled the one Raphelson had been eating from when the U-boat's torpedo hit his ship.

== Summary of raiding history ==
Date	Ship Name	Nationality	Tonnage (GRT)	Fate
16 April 1944	Pan Pennsylvania	United States	11,017	Sunk

== Bibliography ==
- "Explorers Find Sunken German U-Boat Off Mass". Telegram & Gazette. Associated Press. 27 July 2012.
- Gröner, Erich; Jung, Dieter; Maass, Martin (1991). U-boats and Mine Warfare Vessels. German Warships 1815–1945. Vol. 2. Translated by Thomas, Keith; Magowan, Rachel. London: Conway Maritime Press. ISBN 0-85177-593-4.
- Kemp, Paul (1997). U-Boats Destroyed – German Submarine Losses in the World Wars. Arms & Armour. ISBN 978-1-85409-515-2.
- Paterson, Lawrence (2007). U-Boats in the Mediterranean 1941–1944. Chatham Publishing. ISBN 978-1-86176-290-0.
- Helgason, Guðmundur. "U-550". U-boat.net.
- Price, Scott (26 January 2012). "Sinking the U-550: Coast Guard-manned Destroyer Escorts USS Joyce & Peterson Sink a U-boat". US Coast Guard.
