= USS Nantahala (AO-60) =

Cimarron-class oiler

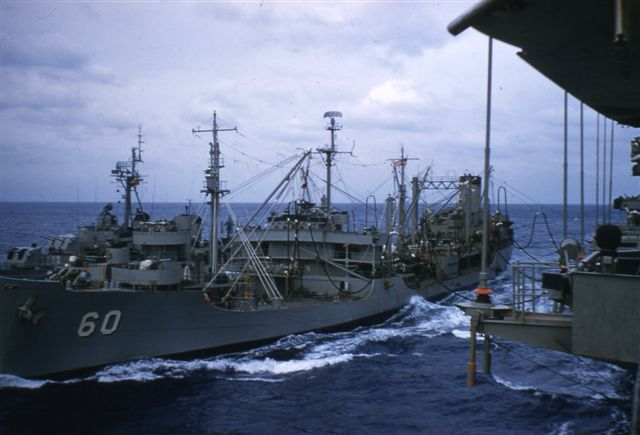
- USS Nantahala

History

United States
- Name: USS Nantahala
- Namesake: Nantahala River in North Carolina
- Builder: Bethlehem Sparrows Point Shipyard
- Laid down: 31 October 1943
- Launched: 29 April 1944
- Commissioned: 19 June 1944
- Decommissioned: 1 June 1950
- Recommissioned: 29 December 1950
- Decommissioned: 2 July 1973
- Honours and awards: 6 battle stars (WWII)
- Fate: Sold, 5 March 1975

General characteristics
- Class & type: [[Cimarron-class_oiler_(1939)-class replenishment oiler|Cimarron-class_oiler_(1939)-class]] replenishment oiler
- Displacement: 7,136 long tons (7,251 t)
- Length: 553 ft (169 m)
- Beam: 75 ft (23 m)
- Draft: 29 ft 10 in (9.09 m)
- Propulsion: Geared turbines 30,400 hp (22,669 kW), twin screws
- Speed: 18 knots (33 km/h; 21 mph)
- Complement: 372 officers and enlisted
- Armament: 1 × 5 in (130 mm) guns; 4 × 3 in (76 mm) guns; 8 × 1.1"/75 caliber guns; 12 × 20 mm guns

USS Nantahala (AO–60), the second ship of this name, was laid down under Maritime Commission contract by Bethlehem Sparrows Point Shipyard, Inc., Sparrows Point, Maryland, on 31 October 1943. Launched on 29 April 1944; sponsored by Miss Mary Louise Reed; delivered to the Navy 19 June 1944; and commissioned the same day.

== Service history ==
=== World War II ===
==== 1944 ====
After shakedown in Chesapeake Bay, Nantahala departed Norfolk on 22 July for the Dutch West Indies where, after loading a cargo of oil and gasoline at Aruba, she steamed for fleet tanker duty in the Pacific. Sailing via Pearl Harbor, she reached Kwajalein on 25 August and served there as station tanker until heading for the Marianas on 2 September. She arrived Guam the 10th and during the remainder of the month deployed twice to replenish ships of the 3rd Fleet attacking Japanese positions from the Palaus to the Philippines.

Nantahala reached Ulithi, Western Carolines, 1 October to continue station and at sea logistic support for the ships of the Pacific Fleet. When not steaming with a replenishment group in the Western Pacific, she refueled and replenished ships at Ulithi. During the remainder of the war she serviced as many as 16 ships a day at this important forward staging base. While anchored in Ulithi Lagoon, she took part in rescue operations following an enemy midget submarine attack which resulted in the torpedoing and burning of USS Mississinewa (AO-59) on 20 November.

Between 21 October and 24 December Nantahala made four deployments in support of ships of the Fast Carrier Task Force. She operated with the replenishment tankers during the Battle off Cape Engaño 25–26 October, and during November and December she ranged the Philippine Sea as carrier aircraft pounded enemy targets on Formosa and in the Philippines. During refueling operations in mid-December, she survived the great typhoon of 17–18 December, although winds, which she recorded at 124 knots (230 km/h), and giant seas caused considerable topside damage.

==== 1945 ====
Nantahala returned to Ulithi on 24 December, and sailed 3 January 1945 to support carrier operations in the South China Sea. While she refueled ships of the task force north and west of Luzon, American planes struck at Japanese shipping and at enemy bases from Indochina to Formosa while supporting the invasion of Luzon at Lingayen Gulf.

After returning to Ulithi via Leyte Gulf 21 January, Nantahala next made two refueling deployments from 8 February to 10 March in support of the invasion and capture of Iwo Jima. Thence, between 22 March and 31 May she took part in three replenishment missions to the Ryukyus where she helped maintain the mobility and striking power of American ships during the invasion and conquest of Okinawa.

After serving as station tanker in Leyte Gulf, Philippines, Nantahala departed Ulithi 3 July for extended replenishment duty with the 3rd Fleet. Assigned to the main replenishment group, she refueled carriers and escorts of TF 38 during the closing weeks of the war, a period in which the American fleet attacked targets in the Japanese home islands from Hokkaido to the Inland Sea with intensive and devastating naval and aerial bombardments.

En route to Ulithi when offensive operations ceased 15 August, Nantahala resumed refueling operations off Japan the 27th. Between 8–16 September she serviced ships of the Fleet at anchor in Tokyo Bay; thence, she sailed via Eniwetok for the United States, arriving at Seattle on 10 November.

Nantahala received six battle stars for World War II service.

=== Post war ===
==== 1945–1950 ====
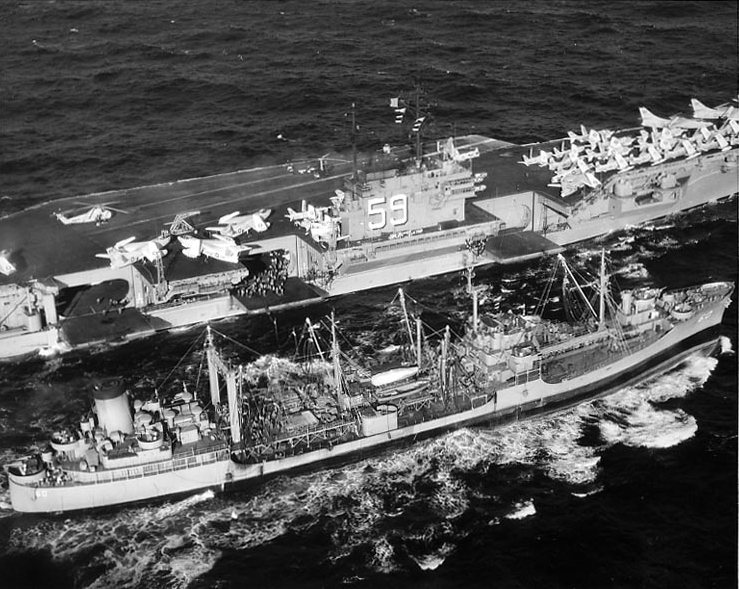
USS Nantahala refuels USS Forrestal (CV-59) during Operation Strikeback - 22 September 1957

During the immediate postwar years Nantahala conducted world-wide refueling and replenishment operations. She deployed to the Far East 28 January 1946; and, until returning to San Pedro, California, 26 March 1947, she operated from the Marianas and Japan to the coast of China, the Philippines, and the Malay Peninsula and in addition carried oil from the Middle East to the Far East. Between 12 September and 20 November she cruised from the West Coast to the East Coast via the Middle East and Suez, and during the next years she made two deployments to the Mediterranean before returning to the West Coast 23 October 1948. The far-ranging oiler made a seven-month deployment to the Far East in 1949. After returning to the West Coast on 22 October 1949, she decommissioned at San Diego 1 June 1950 and entered the Pacific Reserve Fleet.

==== 1950–1961 ====
Nantahala recommissioned at Long Beach on 29 December 1950. Following a five-week run to the Far East and back she transited the Panama Canal 3 April and carried fuel to the 6th Fleet in the Mediterranean. She arrived Boston 19 May and during the next ten months operated along the East Coast and in the Caribbean.

Between 3 March 1952 and 4 October 1961 Nantahala made eight deployments to the Mediterranean where she served with the 6th Fleet. They varied in duration from three to seven months and encompassed the length and breadth of the Mediterranean. Prepared to replenish whenever called upon, this versatile, hard-working oiler provided support for peace-keeping operations by the 6th Fleet. During the Suez Crisis in November, 1956, for instance, she replenished 96 ships while serving as the only fleet oiler in the Eastern Mediterranean. When not deployed with the 6th Fleet, she participated in U.S. or NATO exercises in the North Atlantic and refueled ships of the Atlantic Fleet while cruising from the coast of Western Europe to the coast of Brazil as well as to the Caribbean and along the eastern seaboard of the United States.

==== 1961–1973 ====
On 20 November 1961 Nantahala departed Norfolk for the Dominican Republic where she supported U.S. ships called in to protect the stability of that Caribbean nation's government from possible overthrow by followers of the late dictator Rafael Leónidas Trujillo. After returning to Norfolk the following month, she resumed replenishment duty off the West Indies in January 1962 in preparation for recovery operations following USMC Colonel John Glenn's successful orbital flight in Friendship 7 on 20 February.

During the next year and a half Nantahala operated along the East Coast and in the Caribbean. While serving out of Guantanamo Bay in mid-February 1963, she took part in the search for and tracking of Anzoategui, a Venezuelan freighter which was seized by Cuban-oriented leftists off Santo Domingo. U.S. ships chased the hijacked ship to the coast of Brazil where she was captured by units of the Brazilian Navy. In May Nantahala again replenished ships of the recovery force waiting to pick up Project Mercury Astronaut Commander M. Scott Carpenter, USN, after his orbital flight on 24 May.

Nantahala departed for the Mediterranean on 6 August for operations which lasted until late in the year. From 1963 she maintained a pattern of Mediterranean deployments and alternated duty in the 6th Fleet with replenishment cruises and Atlantic Fleet exercises in the Atlantic and the Caribbean. Into the early 1970s, she continued to provide logistic support for naval forces in the Atlantic and the Mediterranean.

Nantahala was stricken from the Naval Vessel Register on 2 July 1973 and used as a storage vessel at Norfolk. She was disposed of by Maritime Administration sale on 5 March 1975.
