= USS Chipola =

Oiler of the United States Navy

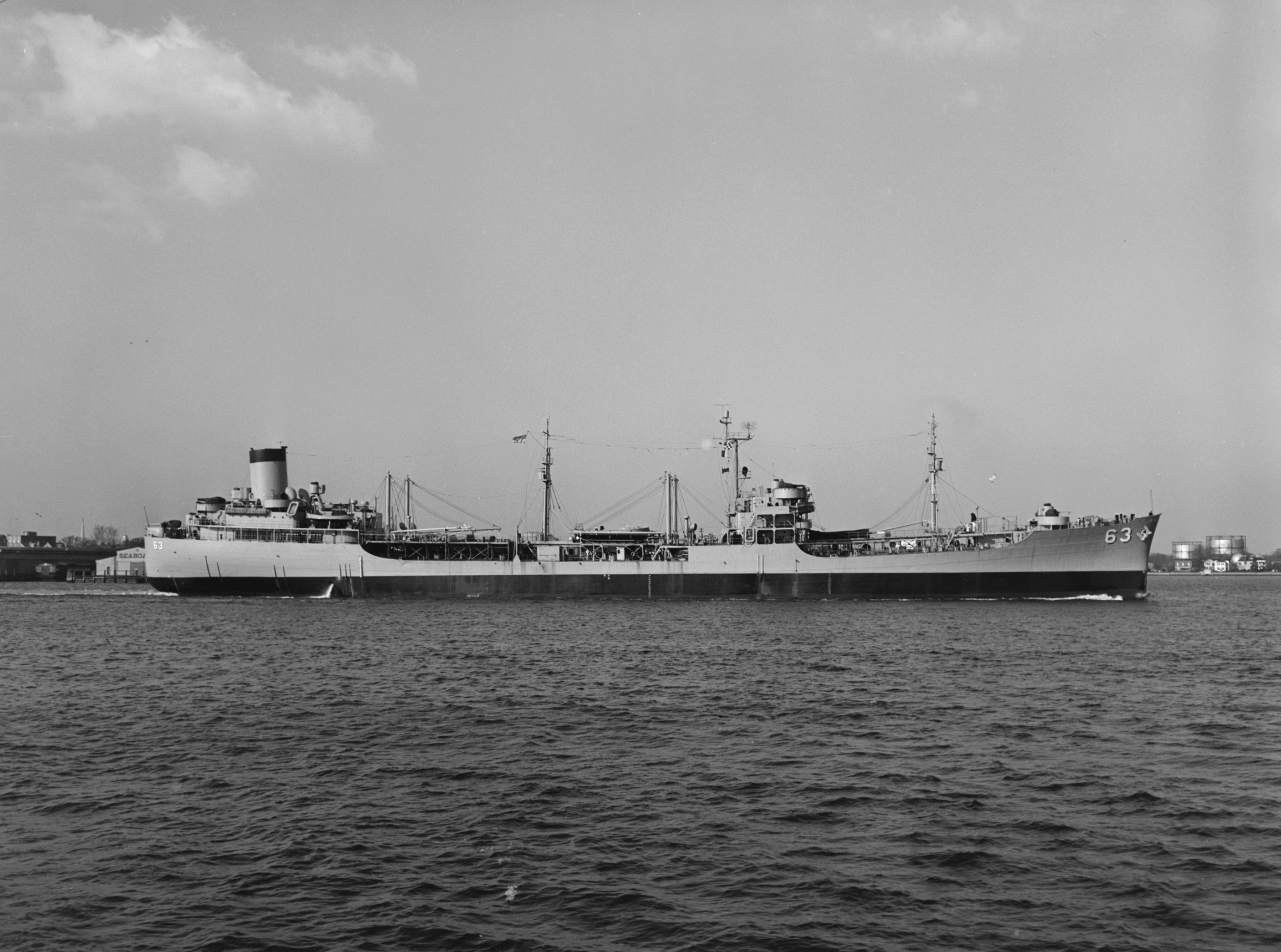

History

United States
- Name: USS Chipola
- Namesake: Chipola River in Florida
- Builder: Bethlehem Sparrows Point Shipyard, Sparrows Point, Maryland
- Launched: 21 October 1944
- Commissioned: 30 November 1944
- Stricken: 14 August 1973
- Fate: Sold, 15 July 1974

General characteristics
- Class & type: Cimarron-class fleet oiler
- Type: T3-S2-A3 tanker hull
- Displacement: 7,236 long tons (7,352 t) light; 25,440 long tons (25,848 t) full load
- Length: 553 ft (169 m)
- Beam: 75 ft (23 m)
- Draft: 32 ft (9.8 m)
- Propulsion: Geared turbines, twin screws, 30,400 hp (23 MW)
- Speed: 18 knots (33 km/h)
- Capacity: 146,000 barrels (23,200 m^{3})
- Complement: 314
- Armament: 1 × 5 in (130 mm)/38 cal. gun; 4 × 3 in (76 mm)/50 cal. guns (4×1); 4 × twin 40 mm AA guns; 4 × twin 20 mm AA guns

Service record
- Operations: World War II, Vietnam War
- Awards: 3 battle stars (World War II); 13 campaign stars (Vietnam)

USS Chipola (AO-63) was a Cimarron-class fleet oiler acquired by the U.S. Navy during World War II. She served her country primarily in the Pacific Theater of Operations, and provided petroleum products where needed to combat ships. For performing this dangerous task in combat areas, she was awarded three battle stars during World War II and thirteen campaign stars during the Vietnam War.

Chipola was launched 21 October 1944 by Bethlehem Shipbuilding Corporation, Sparrows Point, Maryland; Maritime Commission hull 729, sponsored by Mrs. P. C. Chubb; and commissioned 30 November 1944.

== World War II Pacific Theatre operations ==
Chipola arrived at Eniwetok from the U.S. East Coast and the Netherlands West Indies 31 January 1945. She fueled ships in the harbor, and sailed 9 February to operate at sea, serving the ships of the fast carrier task forces raiding Tokyo in preparation for the invasion of Iwo Jima, and then the assault ships which carried out the landings on 19 February. Four days later, Chipola arrived at Ulithi, out of which she sailed between 23 March and 26 August, supporting the carrier task forces in the raids which preceded the Okinawa assault, and in their continuing operations during the conquest of the island. From July, she provided the oil which enabled the carriers and their screening ships to carry out a constant series of air attacks and bombardments on the Japanese home islands.

== End-of-war activity ==
The oiler sailed from Ulithi 8 September 1945 to serve as station tanker at Tokyo Bay and other Far Eastern ports. Between 20 February and 18 March 1946, she sailed to Bahrain in the Persian Gulf to load oil, returning to station tanker duty at Sasebo. After spending the summer on the U.S. West Coast for repairs, she returned to duty in the western Pacific from September 1946 to May 1947, making three voyages to Bahrain during that time.

Returning to the west coast for repairs, Chipola put to sea again 13 June 1947, and sailed west to Bahrain and the Suez Canal, making passage to Norfolk where she arrived 21 August. Almost constantly at sea on the important never-ending duty of keeping the fleet supplied with petroleum products, she voyaged from Norfolk to Bahrain, then sailed to make two voyages between Aruba and the Panama Canal Zone. She sailed from Cristóbal, for Bahrain, continuing through the Far East to San Diego, California, where she was overhauled.

== Mediterranean duty ==
In the second half of 1948, Chipola served ships operating in the Far East once more, making two voyages from Japan to the Persian Gulf oil ports. She returned to west coast operations until 2 September 1949, when she sailed for the Panama Canal and brief duty in the Mediterranean. Chipola sailed from Naples, Italy, for Norfolk, Virginia, and between November and July 1950, made three voyages transporting oil from the east to the west coast.

The oiler operated on the east coast and in the Caribbean until October 1950, when she sailed by way of Bahrain for Sasebo. She proceeded from Sasebo to Bahrain in December, and on the last day of the year sailed for San Francisco, California, and west coast duty until May 1951. Then she returned to the east coast, and carried oil from the Caribbean to Norfolk, as well as twice serving in the Mediterranean, until 3 May 1955 when she was placed in commission in reserve at Philadelphia, Pennsylvania. She was decommissioned 1 August 1955.

== Service with the MSTS ==
Chipola was recommissioned 29 December 1956 for service with the Military Sea Transportation Service until once more placed out of commission in reserve 7 November 1957. She was recommissioned 17 December 1960 and served with the Pacific Fleet.

Chipola received three battle stars for World War II service and thirteen for campaign stars during the Vietnam War.

== Awards ==
Battle stars awarded during World War II:

- (Not recorded)

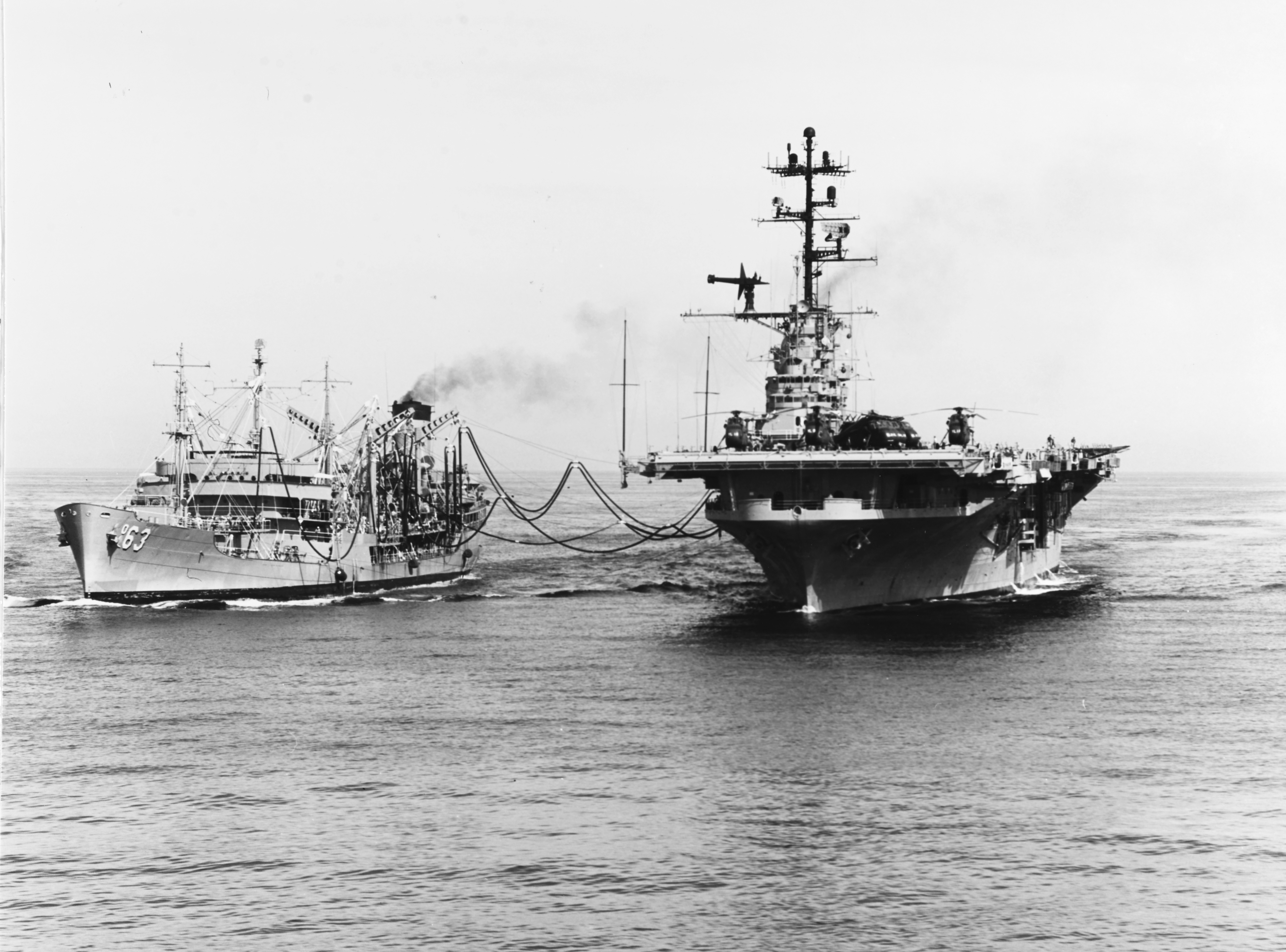
Chipola refueling USS Princeton (LPH-5), 1968.

Campaign stars awarded during the Vietnam War:

- Vietnam Defense
- Vietnamese Counteroffensive
- Vietnamese Counteroffensive - Phase II
- Vietnamese Counteroffensive - Phase III
- Tet Counteroffensive
- Vietnamese Counteroffensive - Phase IV
- Vietnamese Counteroffensive - Phase VI
- Tet/69 Counteroffensive
- Vietnam Winter-Spring 1970
- Sanctuary Counteroffensive
- Vietnamese Counteroffensive - Phase VII
- Consolidation I
- Vietnam Ceasefire
