= USS Marias =

Oiler of the United States Navy

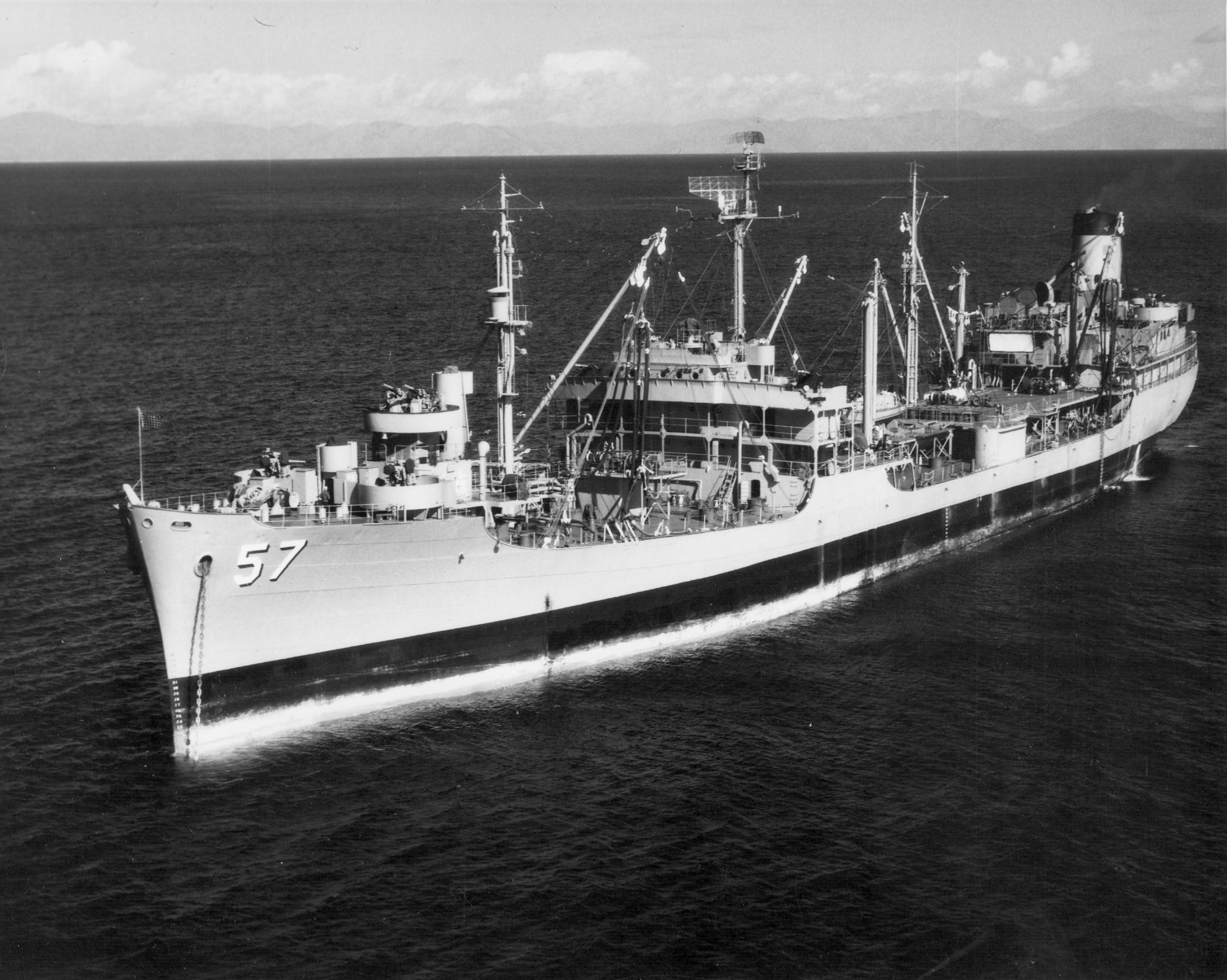
- Fleet oiler USS Marias in the 1950s

History

United States
- Name: USS Marias
- Namesake: Marias River in Montana
- Builder: Bethlehem Shipbuilding Corporation, Bethlehem Sparrows Point Shipyard, Sparrows Point, Maryland
- Launched: 21 December 1943
- Sponsored by: Mrs. Henry Williams
- Acquired: 30 January 1943
- Commissioned: 12 February 1944
- Reclassified: USNS Marias (T-AO-57)
- Stricken: 12 December 1992
- Identification: IMO number: 7737107
- Fate: Sold for scrapping, 18 September 1995

General characteristics
- Class & type: Cimarron-class fleet oiler
- Type: T2-S2-A3 tanker hull
- Displacement: 7,236 long tons (7,352 t) light; 25,440 long tons (25,848 t) full load
- Length: 553 ft (169 m)
- Beam: 75 ft (23 m)
- Draft: 32 ft (9.8 m)
- Propulsion: Geared turbines, twin screws, 30,400 shp (22,669 kW)
- Speed: 18 knots (21 mph; 33 km/h)
- Capacity: 146,000 barrels
- Complement: 314
- Armament: 1 × 5 in (130 mm)/38 cal. gun; 4 × 3 in (76 mm)/50 cal. guns (4×1); 4 × twin 40 mm AA guns; 4 × twin 20 mm AA guns

Service record
- Operations: World War II, Vietnam War
- Awards: 8 battle stars (World War II); 1 campaign star (Vietnam)

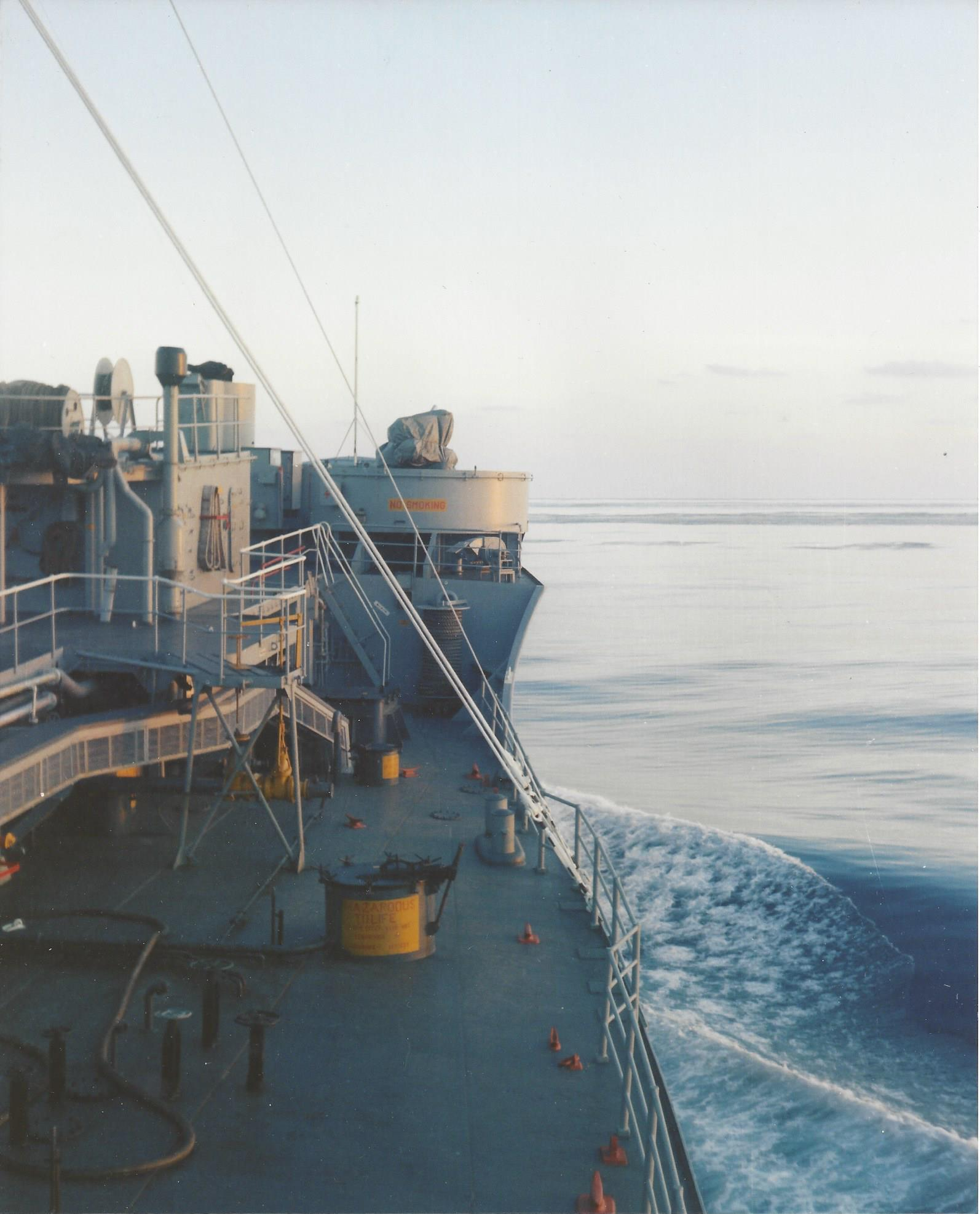
Photo taken from midships approximately 100 miles off the shore of Florida. c.1967

USS Marias (AO-57) was a Cimarron-class fleet oiler acquired by the U.S. Navy during World War II. She served her country primarily in the Pacific Ocean Theatre of Operations, and provided petroleum products where needed to combat ships. For performing this dangerous task, she was awarded eight battle stars during World War II, and one campaign star during the Vietnam War for her bravery in combat areas.

Marias, built under Maritime Commission contract by Bethlehem Sparrows Point Shipyard, Inc., Sparrows Point, Maryland, was launched 21 December 1943; sponsored by Mrs. Henry Williams; and acquired and commissioned 12 February 1944.

== World War II Pacific Theatre operations ==
Marias completed her shakedown cruise in Chesapeake Bay 8 March and ten days later was underway to Aruba, Netherlands West Indies. She loaded fuel oil and proceeded on to the Pacific. By 18 April she was anchored in Majuro Atoll, where she remained for six weeks, fueling the ships participating in strikes against the Marianas and the Carolines.

== Supporting the Saipan invasion ==
On 3 June, the tanker sailed to Eniwetok to refuel fighting ships. Returning to Majuro on the 12th, she loaded for the upcoming Saipan assault, On the fueling station by the 21st, she remained through 3 July, servicing the ships covering the Saipan operation, including those returning from victory in the carrier Battle of the Philippine Sea.

== Supporting Guam and Tinian invasions ==
After replenishing at Eniwetok, she sailed back to the Marianas to support the invasions of Guam and Tinian. On 20 August she proceeded from Eniwetok in convoy to Manus, to refuel ships moving against the Japanese in the Philippines, Volcano, Bonin, and Palau Islands. In mid October, she began to operate in support of the U.S. 3rd Fleet, providing the fuel for their strikes on the Visayan Islands and the ensuing Battle for Leyte Gulf.

== Supporting the invasion of the Philippines ==
At the end of October, Marias commenced operations at her new base, Ulithi. Two weeks later, as the campaign in the Philippines moved north, Marias loaded her tanks and sailed for those islands to fuel the ships conducting strikes on Luzon. During the next 2½ months she remained in Philippine waters refueling, returning periodically to Ulithi for replenishment.

== Supporting Iwo Jima operations ==
Marias next fueled the ships of the U.S. 5th Fleet as they bombarded Iwo Jima and conducted raids on the Japanese homeland. On 24 February 1945, five days after the landings at Iwo Jima, the tanker returned to Ulithi to prepare for the Okinawa campaign. She arrived at the fueling area off Okinawa 16 March for the pre-invasion air and sea bombardment. For the next three months she serviced the ships engaged in the bitterly fought operation making fast run to Ulithi for replenishment.

On 3 July the veteran tanker departed Ulithi for her last wartime operation. Nine days later she took up station in the fueling area east of Honshū fueling the fleet as it struck at the enemy's home islands delivering the final blows of the war.

== End-of-war activity ==
Following the signing of the surrender terms, Marias entered Tokyo Bay, remaining there, with the exception of a voyage to Ulithi for fuel, until departing for the United States 27 October 1945.

== Return to Stateside for upkeep ==
Marias arrived San Pedro, California, 10 November, underwent yard overhaul and departed again for the western Pacific 5 February 1946. There she supported American occupational forces in the Far East until June 1947. During this period she served as a station tanker for two month periods at Taku, Hong Kong, and Shanghai and, operating out of Yokosuka, Japan, made five runs to the Persian Gulf in addition to regular fueling assignments.

On 1 June, Marias sailed for San Pedro, California, for another overhaul, followed by two round the world cruises, completing the second in April 1948. For the next four years, with one interruption - a cruise to Bahrein, 27 July to 9 October 1950 - the ship delivered fuel from the U.S. West Coast to Pearl Harbor and Alaskan ports.

== Middle East operations ==
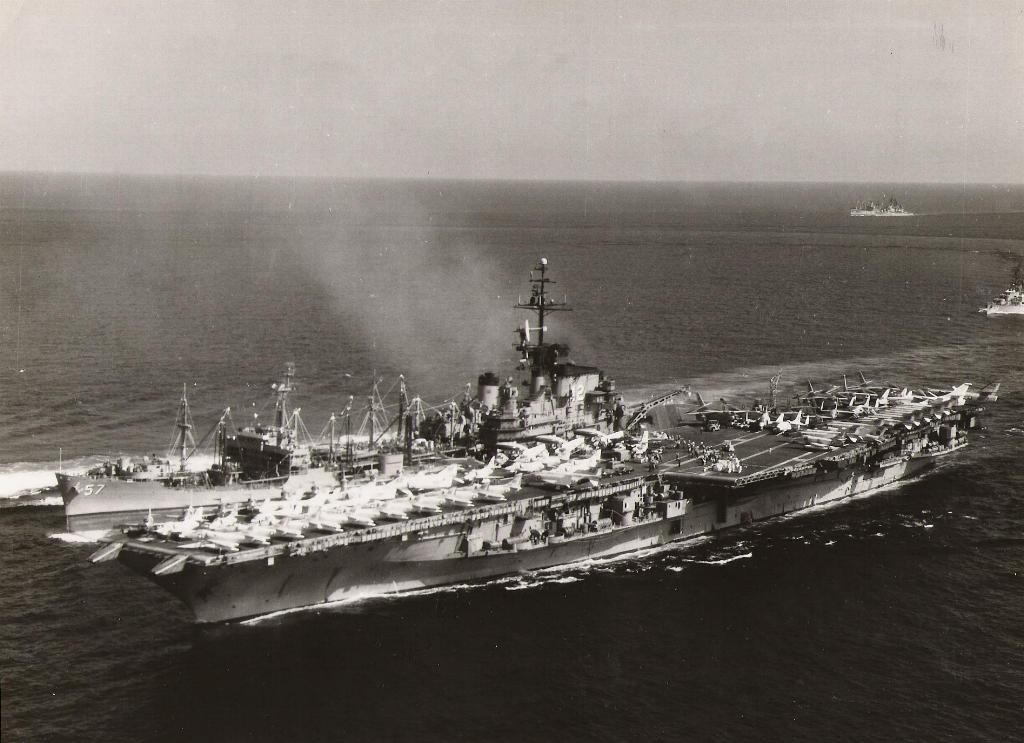
Marias refueling USS Franklin D. Roosevelt in 1966.

On 19 November 1952, Marias departed San Francisco, California, for her first deployment with the U.S. 6th Fleet in the Mediterranean. The following years brought further six month deployments as a "white oiler", a supplier of aircraft fuel to the oilers that serviced the fleet. On 9 May 1955, she was assigned indefinitely to the Mediterranean, home ported at Barcelona, Spain, and for the ensuing years operated as part of Service Force, 6th Fleet.

Reassigned to the East Coast in July 1960, Marias was home ported at Norfolk, Virginia, and attached to the U.S. 2nd Fleet as a fleet oiler. She operated primarily with ASW forces in the western Atlantic into 1969 and was periodically deployed to serve the 6th fleet (1962, 1964, 1965, and 1968).

== Cuban Crisis operations ==
Her 1962 deployment was followed by a Caribbean cruise to support the ships enforcing the quarantine policy during the Cuban Missile Crisis of October to November of that year. Other activities during this period included participation in exercises such as "Sea Orbit 1964"; Operation Steel Pike, the largest peacetime amphibious landing in history (fall 1964); and Operation Springboard (1965 and 1967). These exercises ensured her capability to perform her vital services whenever and wherever called for.

== Operating for MSC ==
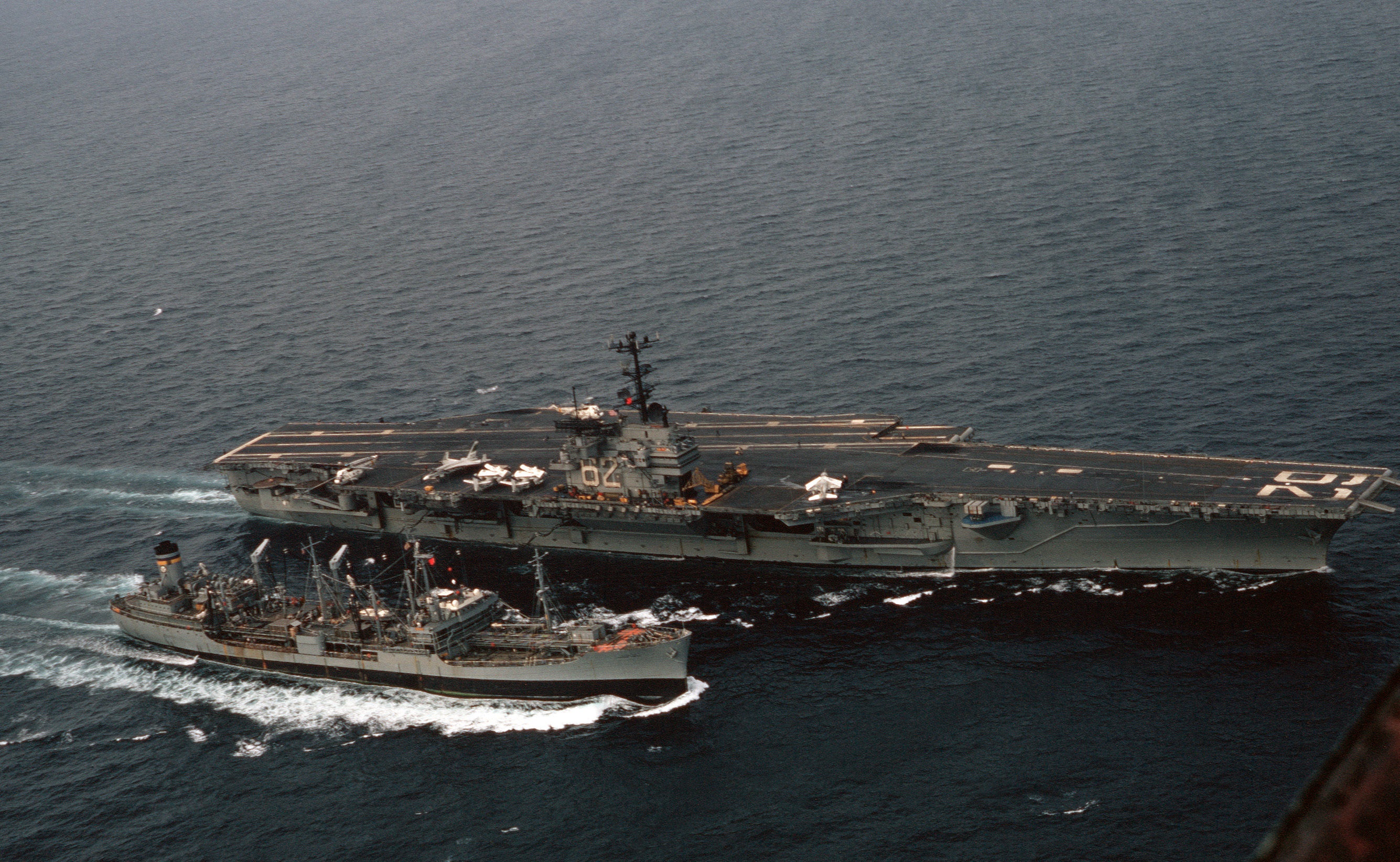
USNS Marias refueling USS Independence, c. 1974.

She was decommissioned from the Navy and placed in service with the Military Sealift Command (MSC) as USNS Marias (T-AO-57) in 1973. As of the mid-1970s, she served as a fleet oiler in the Red Sea, and in 1976 Marias was refueling ships in the Mediterranean. Her home port during these operations was Mayport, Florida. In the summer of 1976 Marias returned to the U.S. and underwent a thorough hull cleaning and refurbishing in Baltimore, Maryland. After completion of that yard period, she spent the next several months in the North Atlantic, taking part in a large multi-national fleet exercise, refueling ships of various NATO countries during the course of the exercise. During that period of time, Marias was replenished several times, and took part in an experimental replenishment from a commercial tanker. Marias returned to her home port, for the first time in many years, in December 1976.

== Fate ==
Marias was transferred on 22 November 1982 to the James River Reserve Fleet. She was struck from the Naval Vessel Register on 12 December 1992 and sold to the Defense Reutilization and Marketing Service on 18 September 1995 for scrapping.

== Awards ==
Marias received eight battle stars for World War II service.
