= USS Tolovana =

Oiler of the United States Navy

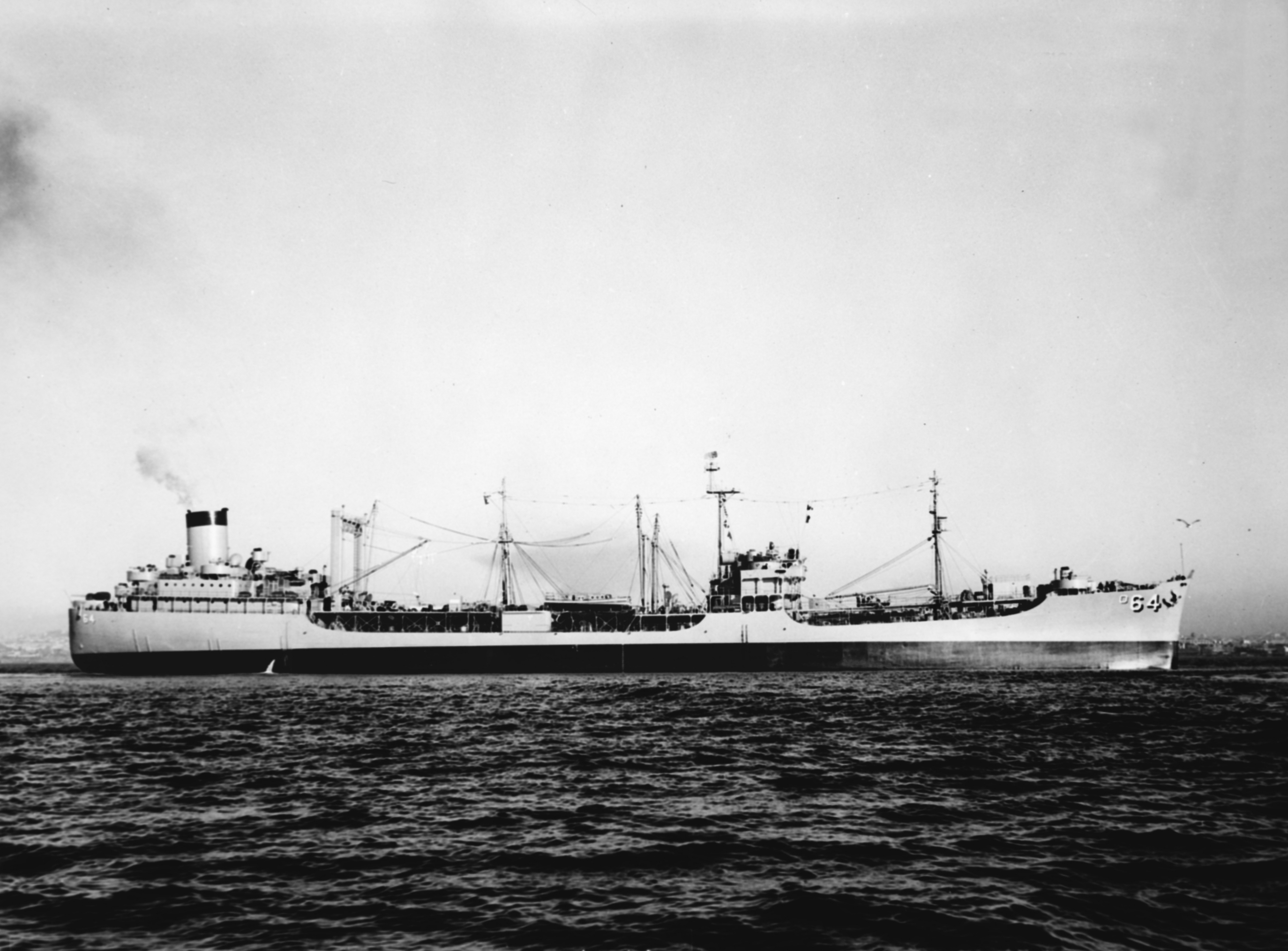
- USS Tolovana on 20 June 1957

History

United States
- Name: USS Tolovana
- Namesake: Tolovana River in Alaska
- Builder: Bethlehem Shipbuilding Corporation, Bethlehem Sparrows Point Shipyard, Sparrows Point, Maryland
- Laid down: 6 June 1944
- Launched: 6 January 1945
- Sponsored by: Mrs. Richard M. Bissell, Jr.
- Commissioned: 24 February 1945
- Decommissioned: July, 1973
- Reclassified: USNS Tolovana (T-AO-64)
- Stricken: 15 April 1975
- Fate: Sold for scrapping, 16 October 1975

General characteristics
- Class & type: Cimarron-class fleet oiler
- Type: T3-S2-A3 tanker hull
- Displacement: 7,236 long tons (7,352 t) light; 25,440 long tons (25,848 t) full load
- Length: 553 ft (169 m)
- Beam: 75 ft (23 m)
- Draft: 32 ft (9.8 m)
- Propulsion: Geared turbines, twin screws, 30,400 shp (22,669 kW)
- Speed: 18 knots (21 mph; 33 km/h)
- Capacity: 146,000 barrels
- Complement: 314 officers and enlisted
- Armament: 1 × 5 in (130 mm)/38 cal. gun; 4 × 3 in (76 mm)/50 cal. guns (4×1); 4 × twin 40 mm AA guns; 4 × twin 20 mm AA guns

Service record
- Operations: World War II, Korean War, Vietnam War
- Awards: 1 battle stars (World War II); 2 battle stars (Korea); 13 campaign stars and the Meritorious Unit Commendation (Vietnam)

USS Tolovana (AO-64) was a Cimarron-class fleet oiler acquired by the U.S. Navy during World War II. She served her country primarily in the Pacific Ocean Theatre of Operations, and provided petroleum products where needed to combat ships. For performing this dangerous task in combat areas, she was awarded one battle star during World War II, two during the Korean War, and thirteen campaign stars and the Navy Unit Commendation during the Vietnam War.

Tolovana was laid down on 5 June 1944 under a Maritime Commission contract (MC hull 730) at Sparrows Point, Maryland, by the Bethlehem Shipbuilding Corporation; launched on 6 January 1945; sponsored by Mrs. Richard M. Bissell Jr.; acquired by the Navy on 24 February 1945; and commissioned that same day.

== World War II Pacific Theatre operations ==
Following shakedown training in Chesapeake Bay and repairs at the Norfolk Navy Yard, Tolovana put to sea on 25 March bound ultimately for the western Pacific. En route, she stopped at Houston, Texas, from 30 March to 2 April; loaded diesel oil; and continued on her way. The oiler transited the Panama Canal on 6 April and, after further repairs at Balboa, Panama, resumed her voyage west.

On 23 April, she reached Pearl Harbor and reported for duty with the Service Force, Pacific Fleet. After completing voyage repairs and loading aviation gasoline, Tolovana stood out of Pearl Harbor on 28 April. On 9 May, she entered the lagoon at Ulithi Atoll in the Western Carolines and reported for duty with Service Squadron 10. Three days later, she returned to sea bound via Kossol Roads in the Palaus to Leyte Gulf. Tolovana discharged the aviation gasoline portion of her cargo at Kossol Roads on 14 and 15 May and transferred her diesel oil to gasoline oilers at San Pedro Bay, Leyte, between 17 and 31 May.

== Dangerous operations ==
Since her tanks had not been contaminated with fuel oil and gasoline constituted the commodity in greatest need at Okinawa, Tolovana was earmarked for duty shuttling it between Ulithi and the combat area which was considered too dangerous for merchant tankers. She returned to Ulithi from Leyte on 2 June and loaded her first full cargo of gasoline. For the remainder of the war, the oiler steamed back and forth between Ulithi and the Ryukyus delivering aviation and automobile gasoline to the tank farm on Okinawa. She experienced frequent air attacks but suffered no combat damage.

== End-of-war activity ==
When the war ended in mid-August, Tolovana was at Okinawa. During the immediate postwar period, she continued to make the Okinawa-Ulithi gasoline shuttle in support of occupation forces. Later that fall, she widened her sphere of operations to include such ports as Jinsen, Korea; and Yokosuka, Japan.

== Supporting atomic testing at Bikini ==
In May 1946, she moved to the Marshall Islands to support Operation Crossroads, the atomic bomb tests conducted at Bikini Atoll. She remained in that area until 17 June when she headed back to the United States. Tolovana reached Long Beach, California, on 6 July and entered the naval shipyard for her first overhaul since commissioning.

== North Pacific operations ==
On 22 September, the ship emerged from the naval shipyard revitalized and began two years of duty along the western coast of North America. During the greater part of that period, Tolovana provided logistics support for bases in Alaska and in the Aleutians chain. She made frequent calls at Adak, Attu, Kodiak, and Anchorage, Alaska, while operating from Seattle, Washington, and periodically returned to California ports for visits and overhauls. She also made a voyage apiece to Guam and to Pearl Harbor during the period.

== Transfer to East Coast operations ==
In August 1948, Tolovana bade farewell to the cold waters of Alaska and headed via the Panama Canal to Bremerhaven, Germany, where she stopped over for five days in mid-September. The oiler returned to the west coast late in October, reaching Long Beach, California, on the 19th, and resumed logistics support missions along the western seaboard and in the Aleutian Islands.

During the ensuing years, she continued such duty. However, her sphere of operations widened to include ports in the western Pacific, in the Indian Ocean, and the Mediterranean Sea. Frequently, she called at such ports as Ras Tanura in Saudi Arabia to take on petroleum products directly from the producers and then carry them to American bases in Japan and the Philippines.

== On loan to the MSTS ==
In August 1949, the Naval Transport Service - with which she had been serving since December 1949 - was reconstituted as the Military Sea Transportation Service (MSTS). When transferred to the new organization, ships like Tolovana ceased to be commissioned ships in the Navy, though they continued to perform their familiar logistics support function for the Navy as well as for the other services.

== Korean War operations ==
The outbreak of war in Korea during the summer of 1950 increased Navy requirements for oilers engaged in direct support of the combat fleet. Thus, they were recalled from MSTS' general logistics operations and converted to perform such missions. Tolovana entered Mare Island Naval Shipyard on 15 February 1951; emerged ready for duty just over three months later; and, on 24 May, was recommissioned. However, the oiler did not deploy immediately to the combat zone. Instead, she resumed operations off the west coast until early July when she made a voyage to Guam. On 24 July, Tolovana departed Guam and shaped a course for Pearl Harbor where she arrived on 8 August. She spent the remainder of the month there, preparing to deploy to the Far East and the Korean combat zone.

On 1 September, the oiler stood out of Pearl Harbor and headed west. Just under two weeks later, she arrived in Sasebo, Japan, and reported for duty with Task Force (TF) 77. Between 20 September and 18 December, Tolovana provided logistic support for the carriers of TF 77 and their supporting forces as well as for United Nations units operating ashore at Chosen, Songjin, and Wonsan. On 18 December, the ship returned briefly to Sasebo and departed the same day on a voyage to Okinawa, Taiwan, and Hong Kong, during which she provided support for American forces at Okinawa and for those engaged in the Taiwan Strait patrols. Tolovana returned to Sasebo on 31 January 1952 and resumed her support role refueling and replenishing units of TF 77 operating off the Korean coast.

== Supplying the Trust Territories ==
On 18 March, the oiler returned to Japan at Yokosuka and, after two days of preparations, sailed for the west coast of the United States. She arrived in San Pedro, California, on 1 April and began two months of training operations. On 7 June, Tolovana put to sea bound for the Trust Territories in the central Pacific where, for the next six months, she delivered fuel and supplies from Pearl Harbor to the mid-Pacific islands: Midway Island, Eniwetok, and Kwajalein. She stopped at Hawaii on 12 December for the last time before returning to the west coast. The next day, the ship shaped a course for Long Beach, California, and entered the port on the 19th.

== Vietnam operations ==
Over the next six years, Tolovana deployed annually to the western Pacific. In each case, she departed the west coast during the summer months and returned in December or January. Her duties normally consisted of logistics missions in support of TF 77 and of the Taiwan Strait patrol. However, during the first of these six tours, she was called upon to join in Operation Passage to Freedom - the evacuation of French and loyal Vietnamese from Haiphong in communist North Vietnam to South Vietnam following the collapse of French rule in Indochina.

The remaining five deployments to the Far East involved routine logistic support for units assigned to TF 77 and to the Taiwan Strait patrol. When not cruising Asiatic waters, Tolovana punctuated training operations off the California coast with upkeep and periodic overhauls.

In January 1960, Tolovana returned to the U.S. West Coast completing the last in her series of six, regular summer-fall deployments to the Far East. This, however, did not signal an end to such duty but rather to its regularity. In fact, over the next four years, she completed five tours of duty in Asian waters. During the second of this series, she was called upon to support those units of the fleet sent to Southeast Asia late in March 1961 to bolster the resolve of pro-western forces in Laos crumbling in the face of a major push on the part of Pathet Lao guerillas supported by North Vietnamese regulars. Though American resolve lessened the probability of a complete collapse of the anticommunist faction in Laos, the crisis did not die away until after Tolovana left the Far East in May to return home. She began her next tour of duty in the western Pacific in October 1961 and returned to the United States in February 1962.

== Supporting Operation Dominic nuclear testing ==
The following summer, the oiler participated in "Operation Dominic", a nuclear test conducted at Christmas Island May to July 1962.

== Continued Vietnam War operations ==
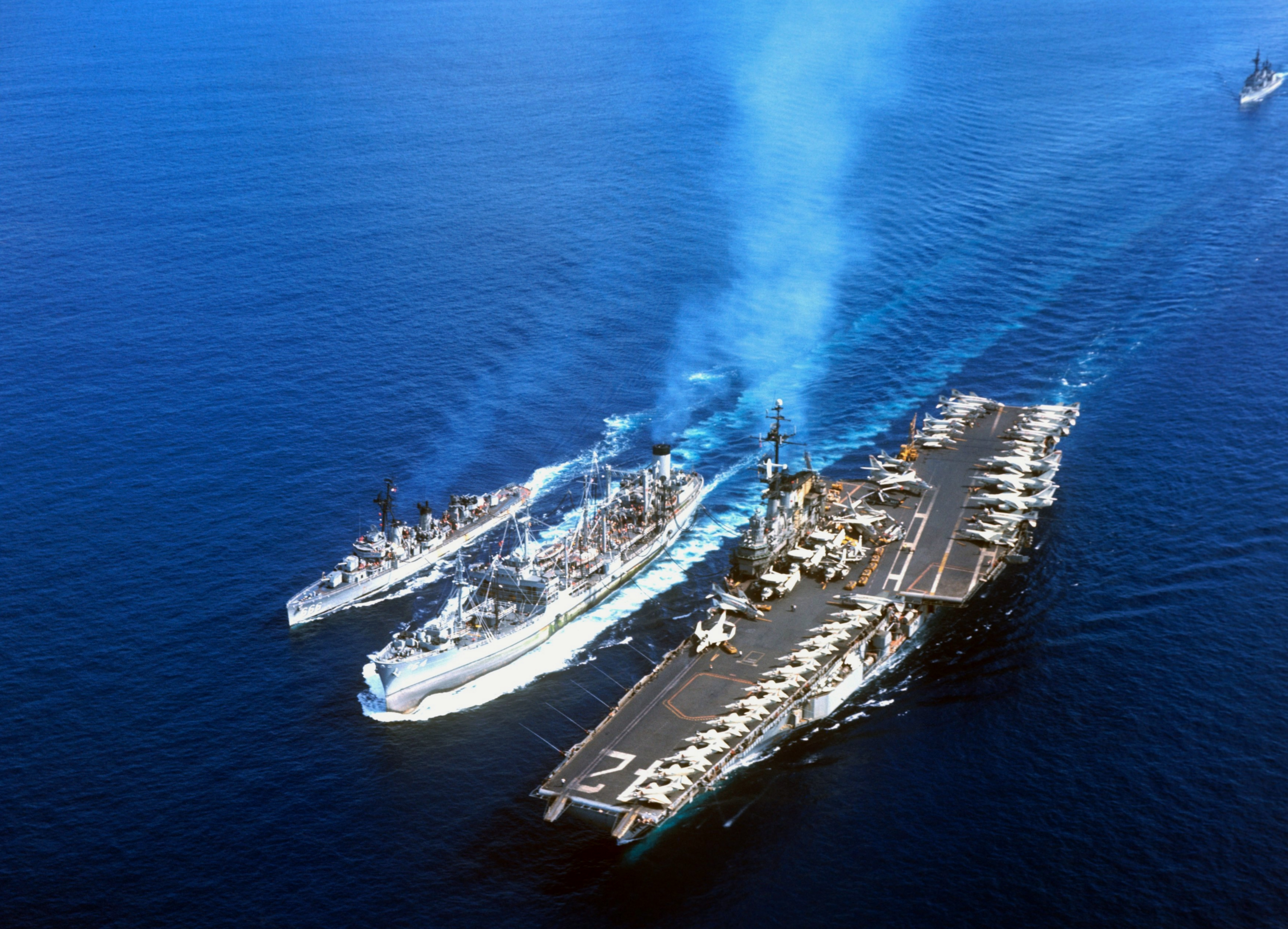
Tolovana refueling USS Franklin D. Roosevelt and USS Black off Vietnam, 12 September 1966.

After another relatively routine assignment with the U.S. 7th Fleet between October 1962 and April 1963, Tolovana entered a decade in which her service mirrored the increasingly more direct involvement of United States forces in the Vietnam War. During that period, she made eight deployments to the western Pacific; and, on each, her crew members qualified for combat campaign ribbons. During the first of this series of tours, American presence remained small, and Tolovana spent comparatively little time in support of the operations there. However, by the time of her next cruise to the western Pacific - July to November 1965 - America's buildup had begun in earnest. From that point on, she concentrated upon replenishing ships in the combat zone, returning briefly to Subic Bay in the Philippines or to Yokosuka or Sasebo in Japan to refill her tanks.

The fact that Tolovana never came under enemy fire did not diminish her effectiveness. She contributed to the success of underway replenishment operations - pioneered by the Navy during World War II - which, in turn, enabled American warships to remain in action for extended periods of time and bring the full weight of their naval might to bear on the struggle.

== Routine operations, Far East liberty ==
On the other hand, there were breaks in the routine. She called at various liberty ports in the Far East such as Hong Kong; Bangkok, Thailand; Yokosuka and Sasebo in Japan; and Kaohsiung, Taiwan. During the 1967 and 1968 deployment, she was ordered north to provide logistics support for ships of Operation Formation Star which answered the call of USS Pueblo, captured on the high seas in violation of international law by forces of the North Korean Navy. However, the major change in routine came between the deployments when she returned to the west coast for upkeep, training, repairs, and periodic overhauls.

Her eighth and last wartime deployment came in September 1972, and she was still in the western Pacific in January 1973 when American involvement drew to a close. The oiler remained in the Far East until the following May and then departed Subic Bay to return to Long Beach where she arrived on the 24th. After three months in port at Long Beach, Tolovana resumed local operations in the southern California operating area until July 1974 when she stood out of San Diego, California, for the last western Pacific cruise of her career. That assignment continued until January 1975 at which time she returned to San Diego. Between 31 March and 1 April, the veteran oiler made the transit from San Diego to Mare Island Naval Shipyard.

== Final decommissioning ==
On 15 April 1975, Tolovana was decommissioned, and her name was struck from the Navy List that same day. She was sold for scrapping, 16 October 1975, to Levin Metals Corp. under contract # (MA-8100) for $1.5M.

== Awards ==
Tolovana earned one battle star during World War II, two battle stars for the Korean War, and 12 battle stars and the Navy Unit Commendation for service off Vietnam.

For World War II:

- Okinawa Gunto operation

For Korean War :

- UN Summer-Fall Offensive
- Second Korean Winter

For Vietnam War:

- Vietnam Defense Campaign
- Vietnamese Counteroffensive
- Vietnamese Counteroffensive - Phase II
- Vietnamese Counteroffensive - Phase III
- Tet Counteroffensive
- Vietnamese Counteroffensive - Phase IV
- Vietnamese Counteroffensive - Phase VI
- Tet 69/Counteroffensive
- Vietnam Winter-Spring
- Sanctuary Counteroffensive
- Vietnamese Counteroffensive - Phase VII
- Consolidation I
- Vietnam Ceasefire
