= Taluga =

Taluga may refer to:

- Taluga (country), proposed micro-nation on the Cortes Bank
- USS Taluga, American Navy oiler ship
