= John H.K. Shannahan =

American historian (1888–1934)

John H.K. Shannahan (1880 – January 2, 1934) was an amateur historian of the Eastern Shore of Maryland. He was born in Easton, Maryland. He worked for the Maryland Steel Company and then Bethlehem Steel for most of his life.

Shannahan studied at Western Maryland College (now McDaniel College), where he met his wife, Beulah Day; they had two sons and two daughters. He was one of the founders of the Eastern Shore Society, and became its secretary and later its president. Shannahan wrote articles about the Eastern Shore for the Evening Sun and the Sunday Sun.

== Works ==
- Steamboat'n'Days and the Hammond Lot (1930)
- Tales of Old Maryland
