= USS Manatee (AO-58) =

Oiler of the United States Navy

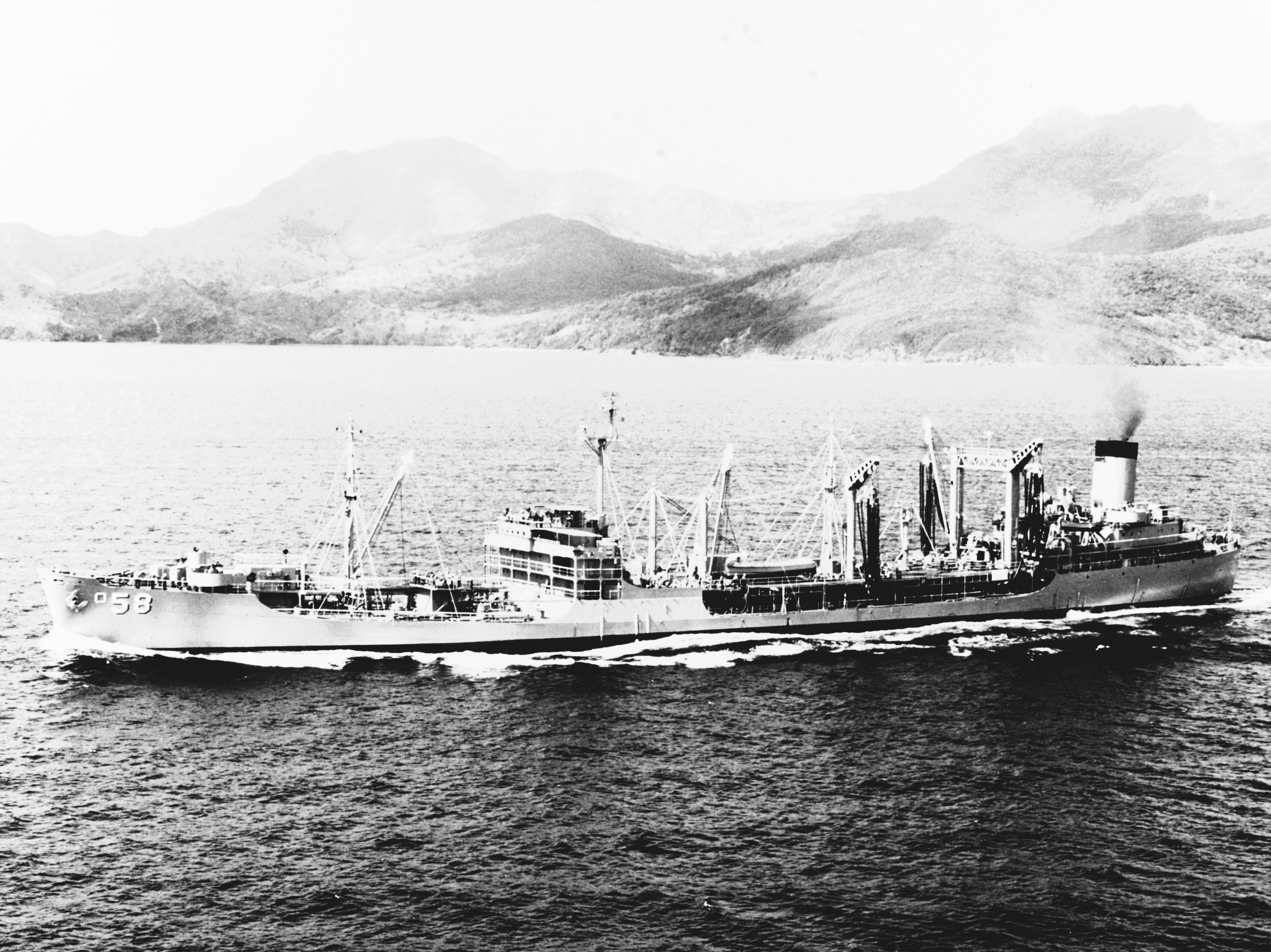
- Manatee at Subic Bay in the Philippine Islands in 1969

History

United States
- Name: USS Manatee
- Namesake: Manatee River in Florida
- Builder: Bethlehem Shipbuilding Corporation, Bethlehem Sparrows Point Shipyard, Sparrows Point, Maryland
- Laid down: 28 August 1943
- Launched: 18 February 1944
- Sponsored by: Mrs. Paul V. McNutt
- Commissioned: 6 April 1944
- Decommissioned: July 1973
- Stricken: 14 August 1973
- Fate: Sold for scrapping, 10 December 1973

General characteristics
- Class & type: Cimarron-class fleet oiler
- Type: T3-S2-A3 tanker hull
- Displacement: 7,236 long tons (7,352 t) light; 25,440 long tons (25,848 t) full load
- Length: 553 ft (169 m)
- Beam: 75 ft (23 m)
- Draft: 32 ft 4 in (9.86 m)
- Propulsion: Geared turbines, twin screws, 30,400 shp (22,669 kW)
- Speed: 18 knots (33 km/h; 21 mph)
- Capacity: 146,000 barrels
- Complement: 314 officers and enlisted
- Armament: 1 × 5 in (130 mm)/38 cal. gun; 4 × 3 in (76 mm)/50 cal. guns (4×1); 4 × twin 40 mm AA guns; 4 × twin 20 mm AA guns

Service record
- Operations: World War II, Korean War, Vietnam War
- Awards: 8 battle stars (World War II); 6 battle stars (Korea)

The USS Manatee (AO-58)—the second vessel of the United States Navy to bear the name—was a Cimarron-class fleet replenishment oiler named for a river in Florida. Cimarron-class oilers were named after American rivers in the Southern United States.

Manatee was laid down 28 August 1943 by the Bethlehem Sparrows Point Shipyard, Inc. of Sparrows Point, Maryland, as a Maritime Commission type (T3-S2-A3) tanker hull with a cargo capacity of 146,000 barrels, under Maritime Commission contract (MC hull 724); launched 18 February 1944; sponsored by Mrs. Paul V. McNutt; and commissioned 6 April 1944.

== Service history ==
=== World War II ===
Shortly after a ten-day shakedown period, Manatee departed the Chesapeake Bay area for the Dutch West Indies. Loading at that oil center, she got underway for the Panama Canal and the Pacific. Arriving at Eniwetok 16 June 1944, she replenished the amphibious forces then invading Saipan. She shuttled from Eniwetok to the fueling areas throughout the campaigns for Saipan, Tinian, and Guam, until moving to Manus, largest of the Admiralty Islands, 20 August. From Manus, she continued carrying fuel and other supplies to fast carrier groups through the Battle of Peleliu and the first phase of the Philippine Campaign. By 20 October, when Manatee departed Manus for the last time, the atoll Ulithi at the western edge of the Caroline Islands had been secured and established as a regional center for fleet oilers.

From the Admiralties, Manatee proceeded north to support the forces then covering the Leyte landings. Her fueling activities kept her in the Philippines until late February 1945, when she returned to Ulithi, where three months earlier one of the Manatee's sister ships, the oiler Mississinewa, had been sunk by a Kaiten. From Ulithi, Manatee steamed back to Leyte Gulf to fuel the amphibious forces gathering for the Okinawa campaign. On 28 March she began shuttling oil from Ulithi to the carrier groups operating in the Battle of Okinawa. She continued to work this supply line until the securing of the island on 21 June, 82 days after the initial landings. On 2 July, Manatee was ordered to join other fast oilers in lending close support to carrier groups during strikes on the Japanese home islands. The oilers moving at night to rendezvous with the carriers, refueled them within 200 miles (320 km) of the enemy's coastline, and then retired. Efficient organization and rapid routing of empty oilers to Ulithi for refueling resulted in an ample supply of fuel oil for the fleet carrier forces.

Statistics regarding the distance that the Manatee traveled in its first year of service and the amounts of oil and gasoline the ship transported and discharged are impressive. Manatee steamed 65,205 nautical miles (120,760 km; 75,037 mi) during 198 days at sea between 6 April 1944, and 6 April 1945. In its support of Pacific land, sea, and air operations, the Manatee discharged in just that twelve-month period 1,319,468 barrels of black oil; 39,476 barrels of diesel oil; and 3,250,993 gallons of gasoline. Each of those replenishment totals would, of course, increase appreciably by war's end.

=== Post-war ===
With the formal cessation of hostilities in the Asiatic-Pacific Theater on 15 August 1945, Manatee sailed for Ulithi en route to San Pedro, California, arriving there on 7 October. The oiler soon departed the west coast for the Far East, returning to the western Pacific at the end of November to support the occupation operations. The Manatee at this time had to carry out these and other deployments with a crew steadily being reduced in size by post-war discharges and reassignments. By November 1945, the ship's roster, according to onboard medical crew, had again "been cut down from 268 to 170 men—seven chiefs—seven officers", amounting to a 46% reduction in personnel from the ship's full wartime complement of over 300 men. Those post-war cuts also included daily maintenance personnel and basic crew services. Manatee later made three round-trip voyages between the oil ports on the Persian Gulf and Tokyo before sailing for Hawaii. Overhaul completed at Pearl Harbor she departed Hawaii 11 September 1947 for the Persian Gulf. On this voyage the oiler was loaded at Ras Tanura, Arabia, and off-loaded at Norfolk, Virginia, having arrived 17 November via the Suez Canal and Gibraltar. Early the next year she departed for the Persian Gulf and made two voyages to Japan from Bahrein before returning to Norfolk 22 April 1948. She then commenced shuttle trips between Aruba, Bayonne, New Jersey, and NS Argentia, Newfoundland. Departing the latter port 2 June, she steamed via the Persian Gulf and Japan for California, arriving 20 August. On 6 January 1949 the oiler departed Long Beach, California, for the western Pacific. Having completed three round trip cruises between Sasebo and the Persian Gulf, she returned to the west coast 17 July.

At San Francisco, her rig for fueling at sea was removed and Manatee began 20 months' service as an MSTS vessel. At first operating along the West Coast, her assignments soon extended to the Caribbean, gulf and east coasts. Before October 1950 she made four trips to Norfolk via the Panama Canal Zone and the Dutch West Indies, as well as several shuttle trips between the latter and east coast ports. On 27 October, she departed Boston for Ras Tanura on the Persian Gulf. By 17 February, having called at Manila, Yokosuka, and Pearl Harbor, she was back at Long Beach. There Manatee was re-equipped for fueling at sea and again became a fleet oiler to support the fleet during the Korean War.

=== Korean War ===
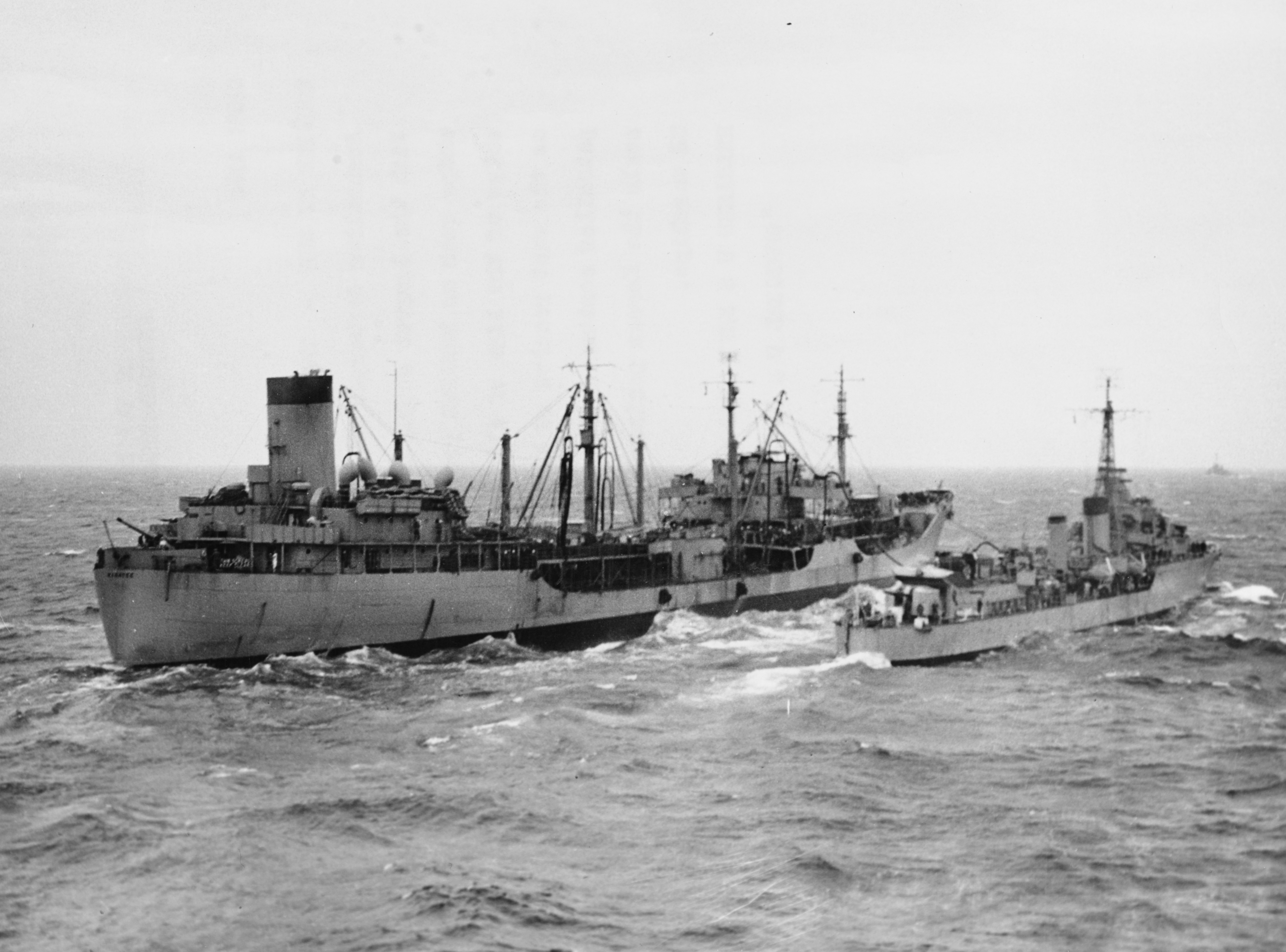
Manatee refuels HMAS Warramunga off Korea on 27 June 1951.

On 17 March 1951 Manatee arrived in Japanese waters to begin her first annual WesPac deployment. After brief periods at Tokuyama and Sasebo, she received orders to replenish the Taiwan Straits Patrol. She returned to Sasebo 20 May and commenced servicing United Nations ships in combat areas off the Korean coast. She continued to operate out of Sasebo for the next five months, returning to Long Beach 11 August. Her next two WestPac deployments, 21 March to 19 October 1952 and 6 February to 29 July 1953, followed the same pattern, one month with the Taiwan Straits Patrol and the remainder of the tour operating out of Sasebo in support of Korean operations.

For the next five years Manatee's operating schedule continued to be six months in the western Pacific, six months on the west coast. During this period, she participated in fleet operations and in underway training exercises, as well as undergoing regular overhauls. Included in her Pacific deployment for 1954 was the replenishment of the ships present in the Marshall Islands for the March hydrogen bomb tests. Manatee received eight battle stars for World War II service and six for Korean War service.

=== Vietnam War ===
Scheduled for only four months deployment in the western Pacific in 1958, mid-May through mid-September, Manatee remained an extra month to service the ships called to the area during the Second Taiwan Strait Crisis. The following year, after her four months WestPac duty, Manatee was chosen, because of consistently efficient service, to take part in a joint Canadian-American replenishment demonstration held 8 October 1959 for the 14th Annual Conference of the National Defense Transportation Association.

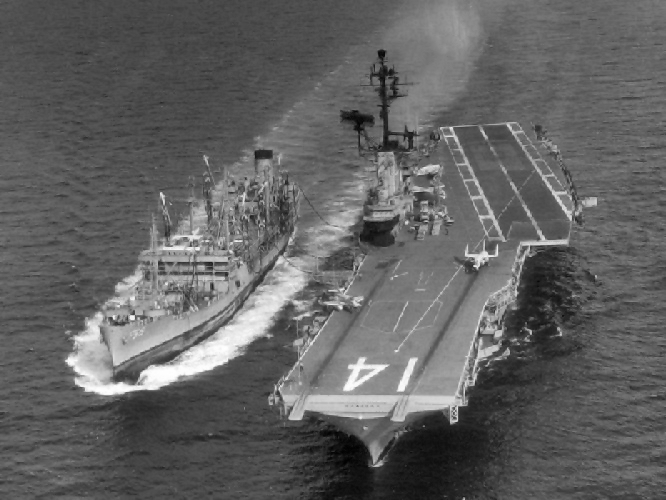
Manatee refuels USS Ticonderoga, 15 July 1965.

In the year that followed Manatee continued to alternate duty on the west coast with Far Eastern service. She was one of seven ships chosen to visit Australia, 29 April–13 May, for the 1963 Battle of the Coral Sea celebration. With the stepped-up operations in Vietnam, Manatee's 1964 WestPac tour was extended to 8½ months, May 1964 through January 1965. During this period she operated principally in the South China Sea. South China Sea operations also occupied most of her 1966, 1967, and 1968 tours, replenishing the ships of the 7th Fleet on patrol in that area in support of the Vietnam War.

After refueling the aircraft carrier USS Ticonderoga off the southern California coast on 20 August 1971; a valve on the Manatee was left open and about 230,000 gallons of heavy fuel oil were spilled. The large spill created an oil slick that washed ashore, affecting a 65-mile (105 km) stretch of beaches from the Mexican border northward to San Clemente, California, where President Richard Nixon was vacationing at his home there, a residence that reporters at the time often referred to as the "Western White House". The Navy took charge of the clean-up efforts. "Hundreds of sailors and marines" were dispatched and worked 10 days to clean the beaches. Following federal and state investigations of the incident, the commanding officer of the Manatee, Captain Jack L. Snyder, was relieved of his command.

Decommissioned in July 1973, Manatee was struck from the Naval Vessel Register on 14 August 1973. Transferred to the Maritime Administration for disposal, she was sold for scrapping, 10 December 1973, to Zidell Exploration of Portland, Oregon.
