= USS Kaskaskia =

Oiler of the United States Navy, 1940–1969

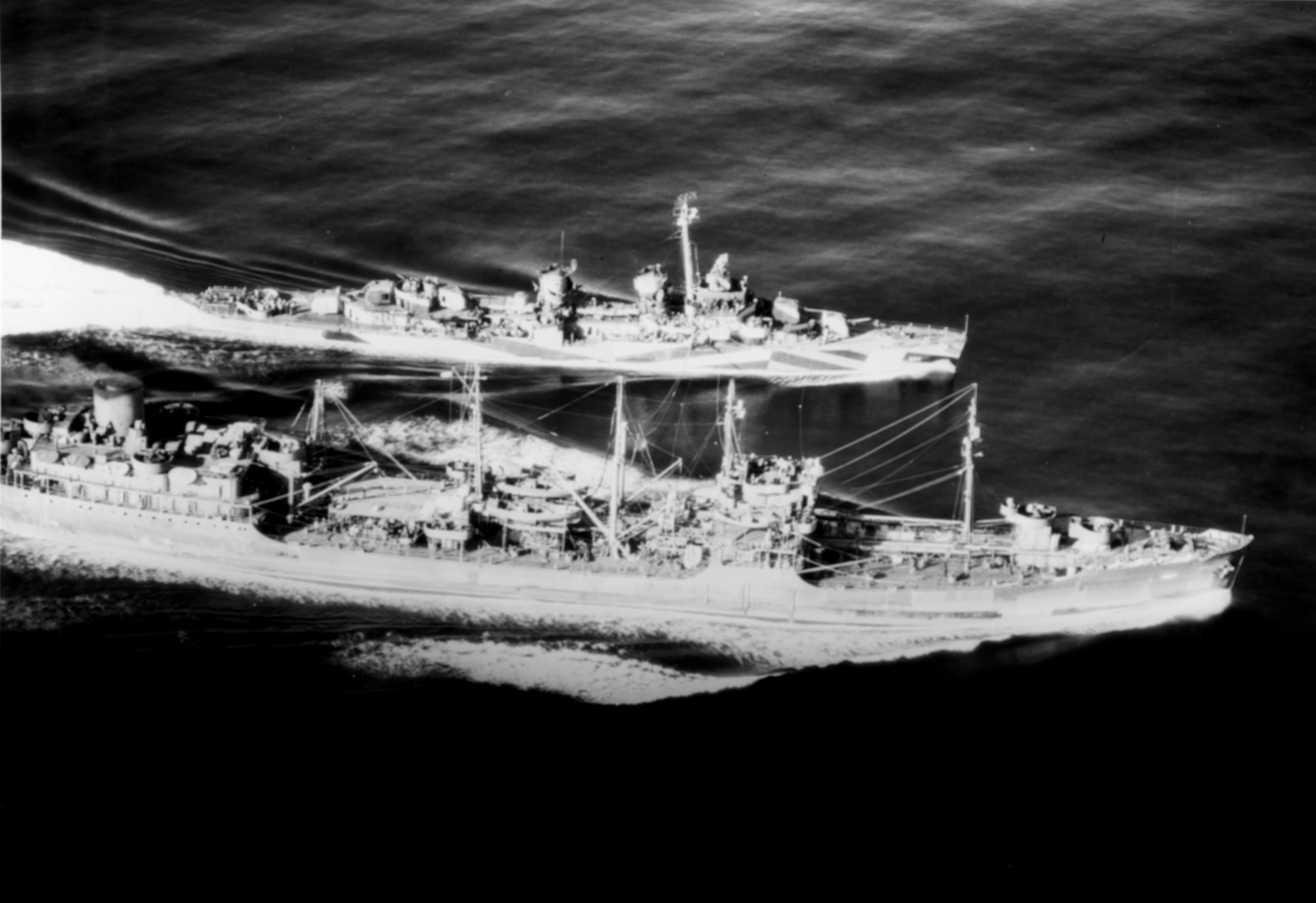
- USS Kaskaskia (AO-27) (foreground) refueling the destroyer USS Hart (DD-594) at sea on 16 December 1944.

History

United States
- Name: USS Kaskaskia
- Namesake: Kaskaskia River in Illinois
- Builder: Newport News Shipbuilding & Drydock Company, Newport News, Virginia
- Launched: 29 September 1939
- Sponsored by: Mrs. Joseph P. Kennedy
- Acquired: 22 October 1940
- Commissioned: 29 October 1940
- Decommissioned: 21 October 1957
- Stricken: 2 January 1959
- Reinstated: 8 September 1961
- Recommissioned: 6 December 1961
- Decommissioned: December 1969
- Fate: Sold for scrapping September 1970

General characteristics
- Class & type: Cimarron-class fleet replenishment oiler
- Displacement: 7,470 long tons (7,590 t) light; 24,830 long tons (25,228 t) full load
- Length: 553 ft (169 m)
- Beam: 75 ft (23 m)
- Draft: 32 ft 4 in (9.86 m)
- Propulsion: Twin screws, 30,400 shp (22,669 kW); Steam (600psi), NSFO
- Speed: 18 knots (33 km/h; 21 mph)
- Complement: 304
- Armament: 4 × 5 in (130 mm)/38 cal. guns (4×1); 4 × 40 mm AA guns; 4 × 20 mm AA guns

Service record
- Operations: World War II, Korean War
- Awards: 9 battle stars (World War II); 7 battle stars (Korean War)

USS Kaskaskia (AO-27) was a United States Navy Cimarron-class fleet replenishment oiler in commission from 1940 to 1959. She was named for the Kaskaskia River in Illinois.

== Construction and commissioning ==
Kaskaskia was launched on 29 September 1939 by the Newport News Shipbuilding & Drydock Company at Newport News, Virginia; sponsored by Mrs. Joseph P. Kennedy. The U.S. Navy acquired the ship from the Esso Oil Company on 22 October 1940 and commissioned her on 29 October 1940.

== Service history ==
=== Pre-World War II ===
Kaskaskia departed Boston, Massachusetts, on 19 November 1940 for Pearl Harbor, Territory of Hawaii, arriving on 3 January 1941. She transported oil between United States West Coast ports and Pearl Harbor, making six voyages before 7 August 1941, when she made an oil run to Johnston Island at Johnston Atoll. She arrived at Mare Island Navy Yard in California on 10 September 1941 for overhaul and repairs.

=== World War II ===
Kaskaskia was at San Francisco, California. when the Japanese made their surprise attack on Pearl Harbor on 7 December 1941, bringing the United States into World War II and beginning the war's Pacific campaign. Kaskaskia immediately began preparations to join the Service Force in the Pacific theater.

Departing from San Diego, California, on 6 January 1942, Kaskaskia commenced fueling operations en route before arriving at Pago Pago in American Samoa 20 January 1942. She then proceeded to Grand Terre in New Caledonia, where for the next six months she operated from Nouméa, refueling ships engaged in opposing the initial Japanese advance. She arrived at Kodiak, Territory of Alaska, on 3 July 1942 with a cargo of oil and fuel for use in the Aleutian Islands campaign. After arriving at Wilmington, California, she loaded oil and aviation gasoline and continued oil runs to Alaskan ports until she steamed to Nouméa late in March 1943. She subsequently supplied many ships involved in successful Allied operations against Japanese forces in the Southwest Pacific.

Kaskaskia arrived at San Pedro, California, on 28 July 1943 for repairs before resuming her duties at Pearl Harbor on 21 September 1943. She transported oil between California and Hawaii until she got underway on 25 November 1943 to support operations in the Gilbert Islands during the Gilbert and Marshall Islands campaign. Returning to Pearl Harbor on 10 December 1943, she resumed her voyages between San Pedro and Hawaii.

Kaskaskia departed Pearl Harbor on 16 January 1944 to support operations in the Marshall Islands as the Gilbert and Marshall Islands campaign continued. After U.S. forces captured Kwajalein Atoll and Majuro Atoll from the Japanese, Kaskaskia supported aircraft carrier task forces as they conducted raids on Truk Lagoon (in Operation Hailstone), the Mariana Islands, and the Palau Islands in February and March 1944.

Kaskaskia continued fueling operations in the Marshall Islands area until she departed Majuro Atoll on 6 June 1944 to fuel destroyers and destroyer escorts supporting the invasion of Saipan. Throughout June and July 1944 Kaskaskia remained on hand in support of U.S. forces as they captured Saipan, Guam, and Tinian.

As U.S. forces fought toward the Philippines, the United States decided to invade the Palau Islands so they could serve as a staging area for aircraft and ships during the upcoming invasion of Leyte in the Philippines. Kaskaskia departed Manus Island on 4 September 1944 with a task group bound for the invasion of Peleliu. She operated in the Palau Islands area until returning to Manus on 8 October 1944. Her stay was a brief one, however, as she departed on 10 October 1944 for Leyte. She fueled ships of the invasion fleet from prior to the actual landings on Leyte until United States Army forces had established a secure beachhead on the island. She then steamed to Ulithi Atoll, which she reached on 23 October 1944. She made another fueling run to the Philippines area early in November 1944.

After an overhaul at San Diego that lasted from December 1944 through February 1945, Kaskaskia arrived at Kwajalein on 11 March 1945 to resume service with the fleet. She left Ulithi Atoll on 30 March 1945 for the fueling area off Okinawa and subsequently refueled ships engaged in the Battle of Okinawa.

After completing her fueling duties off Okinawa, Kaskaskia departed Ulithi on 3 July 1945 to refuel ships of the Fast Carrier Task Forces as they launched raids on the Japanese Home Islands of Honshū and Hokkaidō. After Japan surrendered on 2 September 1945, Kaskaskia steamed into Tokyo Bay on 10 September 1945 with ships of the occupation forces.

=== 1945–1950 ===
In the aftermath of the war, Kaskaskia continued refueling operations in Japan, China, and Formosa for an entire year before arriving at San Pedro on 28 September 1946. Between 1947 and 1950 she transported oil and aviation gasoline from the United States West Coast to the East Asia and naval bases in the mid-Pacific Ocean.

=== Korean War ===
North Korea invaded South Korea on 25 June 1950. Kaskaskia got underway from San Diego on 16 September 1950 to operate from Sasebo, Japan, in support of United Nations forces fighting on the Korean Peninsula. During October 1950 she entered the heavily mined waters off Wonsan, Korea, fueling ships blockading and bombarding that key port.

During December 1950 Kaskaskia arrived off Hungnam, Korea, to service ships engaged in evacuation operations in that area. Kaskaskia continued to conduct fueling operations between Japan and Korea throughout the winter of 1950–1951 and during the United Nations counteroffensive against North Korean forces in the spring of 1951. She arrived at Long Beach, California, on 27 August 1951 for an overhaul. After its completion, she conducted operations along the U.S. West Coast.

Kaskaskia departed the United States in January 1952 for her second Korean War tour, arriving at Sasebo on 22 January 1952 and resuming her refueling services for ships operating off Korea. She also supplied ships in Japan, Okinawa, and Formosa before returning to Long Beach on 31 July 1952 for an overhaul and training. She made her third Korean War deployment from 27 December 1952 to July 1953. On this tour she supported ships engaged in fire support operations. Hostilities in Korea ended in a ceasefire on 27 July 1953.

=== 1953–1959 ===
Returning to the United States on 17 August 1953, Kaskaskia underwent an overhaul. She then departed again for East Asia on 4 January 1954, operating from Sasebo before returning to the United States, where she arrived at San Francisco, California, on 12 October 1954. Following operations along the U.S. West Coast, Kaskaskia was decommissioned and placed in reserve on 8 April 1955.

The U.S. Navy transferred Kaskaskia to the Military Sealift Command on 8 January 1957. She operated in that capacity with a U.S. Navy crew until 21 October 1957, when again she was decommissioned. She was turned over to the United States Maritime Administration on 10 December 1957 and struck from the Navy List on 2 January 1959.

=== 1960s ===
The Berlin Crisis of 1961 necessitated the reactivation of ships and Kaskaskia was reinstated on the Navy List on 8 September 1961. Following overhaul and alterations she was recommissioned at Hoboken, New Jersey, on 6 December 1961. After shakedown operations in the Caribbean, she arrived at Naval Station Mayport, Florida, on 1 May 1962. Throughout the summer of 1962 she engaged in exercises off the Florida coast, then steamed to the Azores to participate in Project Mercury crewed orbital spaceflights. She was in company with the aircraft carrier USS Kearsarge (CV-33) during Kearsarge's recovery of astronaut Wally Schirra on 3 October 1962.

Kaskaskia returned to Mayport 22 October 1962 and on 24 October 1962 got back underway to participate in the Cuban blockade, ordered by President John F. Kennedy when the Soviet Union tried to base offensive ballistic missiles in Cuba only 90 miles (78 nmi; 145 km) from the United States, precipitating the Cuban Missile Crisis. After the Soviet Union withdrew the missiles, Kaskaskia returned to operations from Mayport on 21 November 1962.

Kaskaskia departed Mayport on 5 February 1963 for a six-month Mediterranean cruise to refuel ships of the United States Sixth Fleet, then resumed refueling exercises off Florida for the rest of the year. During 1964 she engaged in fueling operations and exercises off Florida and in the Caribbean.

On 6 January 1965, Kaskaskia sailed for another Sixth Fleet deployment, during which she delivered over 19,000,000 US gallons (16,000,000 imp gal; 72,000,000 L) of fuel to 169 ships. She returned to Mayport on 7 June 1965, then operated primarily along the United States East Coast and in the Caribbean into 1967. Highlights of her service during this period included refueling ships patrolling off riot-torn Santo Domingo in the Dominican Republic during the U.S. intervention there in the summer of 1965, and participation in the recovery of an uncrewed Project Apollo spacecraft in February 1966.

Kaskaskia completed her final Mediterranean deployment in 1969. She was decommissioned for the final time in December 1969. and sold for scrapping in September 1970..

== Awards ==
- China Service Medal
- American Defense Service Medal with fleet clasp
- American Campaign Medal
- Asiatic–Pacific Campaign Medal with 10 battle stars
- World War II Victory Medal
- Navy Occupation Service Medal (with "ASIA" clasp)
- National Defense Service Medal (two awards)
- Korean Service Medal with eight battle stars
- Armed Forces Expeditionary Medal (two awards)
- United Nations Service Medal (United Nations)
- Korean War Service Medal (Republic of Korea)
