= USS Allagash =

Oiler of the United States Navy

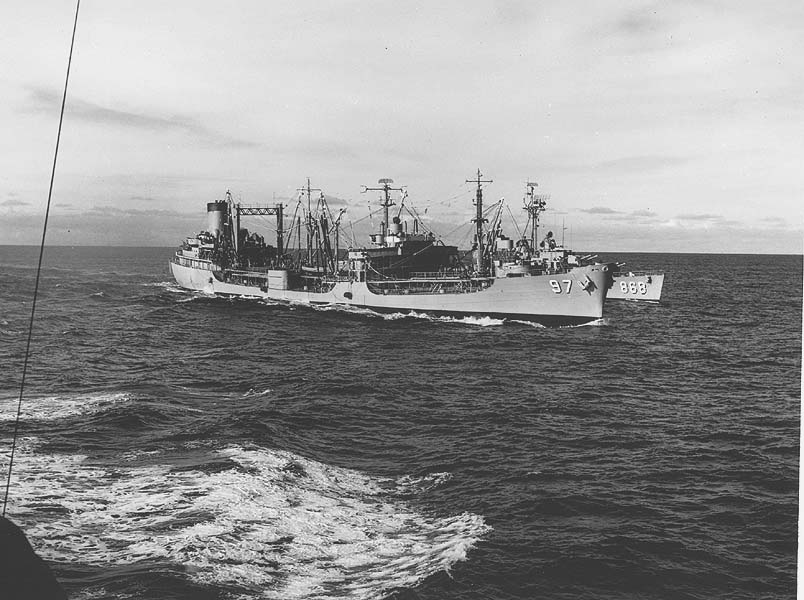
- USS Allagash refueling USS Brownson in 1962

History

United States
- Name: USS Allagash
- Ordered: as T3-S2-A1 tanker hull; MC hull 2559
- Laid down: 26 October 1944,
- Launched: 14 April 1945
- Commissioned: 21 August 1945
- Decommissioned: 21 December 1970
- Stricken: 1 June 1973
- Fate: Sold for scrapping, 22 March 1976

General characteristics
- Class & type: Cimarron-class oiler
- Displacement: 7,236 t.(lt) 25,400 t.(fl)
- Length: 553 ft (169 m)
- Beam: 75 ft (23 m)
- Draft: 32 ft 4 in (9.86 m)
- Propulsion: geared turbines, twin screws, 30,400 hp (22,700 kW)
- Speed: 18.3 knots (33.9 km/h)
- Capacity: 146,000 barrels
- Complement: 304
- Armament: one single 5 in (130 mm)/38 dual-purpose gun mount; four single 3 in (76 mm)/50 dual-purpose gun mounts; four twin 40 mm AA gun mounts; four twin 20 mm AA gun mounts

USS Allagash (AO-97) was an Cimarron-class oiler constructed for the U.S. Navy for use in World War II. She had the dangerous task of supplying fuel and ammunition to ships in and near combat area.

Allagash was laid down on 26 October 1944 at Sparrows Point, Maryland, by the Bethlehem Steel Co. under a United States Maritime Commission contract (MC hull 2559); launched on 14 April 1945; sponsored by Mrs. Reuben D. Vining; acquired by the Navy on a loan-charter basis on 21 August 1945; and commissioned that same day.

== World War II North Atlantic operations ==
The oiler departed Baltimore on 27 August for shakedown training in Chesapeake Bay. She completed this cruise—interrupted by an availability at the Norfolk Navy Yard between 4 and 15 September—late in that month and put to sea from Norfolk, Virginia, on 28 September, bound for the West Indies. Operating from Guantanamo Bay, Cuba, the ship spent the next 10 weeks carrying fuel oil between ports on the Gulf Coast of the United States and bases in the West Indies. She also conducted underway refueling exercises before returning to Norfolk on 10 December and remaining there for the rest of the year.

== Post-war Atlantic operations ==
At the beginning of 1946, the ship was assigned to the Naval Transportation Service and began regular voyages carrying oil from gulf coast and West Indian oil ports to cities along the east coast. By August 1947, she expanded her itinerary to include Persian Gulf oil ports, making two round-trip voyages between the United States and the island of Bahrain during the period August 1947 to April 1948. During the summer of 1948, Allagash began deployments with the U.S. 6th Fleet in the Mediterranean Sea.

Returning to the east coast of the United States in September 1948, she resumed runs between the Atlantic seaboard and oil ports in the West Indies and along the coast of the Gulf of Mexico.

== Participation in 1952 NATO exercises ==
Allagash did not deploy to the Mediterranean again until 1951 when she operated with the 6th Fleet between June and September. Her next overseas deployment came in the summer of 1952 when she sailed to northern European ports during a training cruise for midshipmen. That fall, the oiler participated in the NATO exercise "Operation Mainbrace." In the spring of 1953, the ship was once more deployed to the Mediterranean. Operations along the eastern seaboard occupied her time during the latter part of 1953 and the first five months of 1954. Early in June 1954, Allagash sailed for Europe again on the first of two midshipmen training cruises conducted that summer. Repairs and western Atlantic missions took up the remainder of that year.

== 1955 West Indies exercises ==
In mid-January 1955, she completed a three-month overhaul and embarked upon three weeks of refresher training in the West Indies. During the latter part of February and the first week in March, the oiler took part in the annual "Springboard" exercise in the West Indies. She embarked upon another cruise to the Mediterranean early in May and returned to the United States at the beginning of October. Emergency repairs kept her out of operation in November and December.

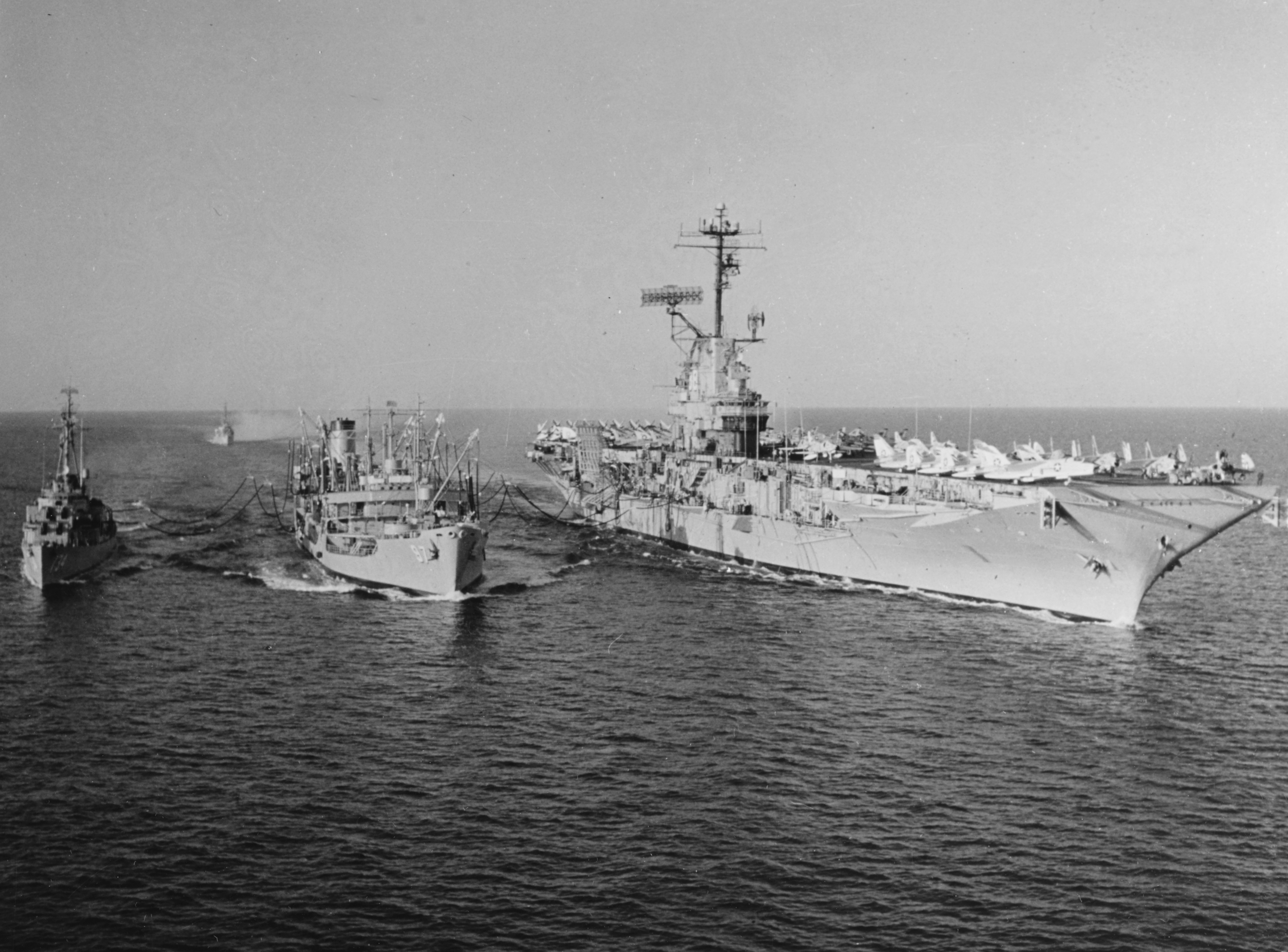
Allagash refueling Shangri-La and Purdy in the Mediterranean Sea, 26 April 1962

In the 10 years between the beginning of 1956 and the beginning of 1966, Allagash continued to conduct operations along the lines established during her first decade of service. She made six deployments to the 6th Fleet in the Mediterranean Sea, participated in NATO exercises, and made midshipmen cruises. When not deployed overseas, the oiler conducted east coast and West Indian missions, including the annual "Springboard" fleet exercise as well as type training, refresher training, and independent ship exercises.

== Supporting the fleet during the Cuban crisis ==
During November and December 1962, she earned the Armed Forces Expeditionary Medal for providing logistics support to the warships enforcing President John F. Kennedy's "quarantine" of Cuba to compel the Soviet Union to remove offensive missiles from that island.

== 1966 South Atlantic tour ==
The year 1966, the first of her last five of active service, began as had many of the previous 20. She had returned from a Mediterranean deployment late in 1965. February 1966 brought the usual "Springboard" exercises in the West Indies followed by several weeks of operations out of Newport, Rhode Island. On 21 June, Allagash departed Newport on a voyage that added a new area of the world to her itinerary, the South Atlantic. During that cruise, she visited Port Elizabeth in South Africa and Rio de Janeiro in Brazil, before returning to Newport on 18 August. After a period of post-deployment standdown and local operations, the oiler began regular overhaul at Boston on 17 November.

== 1968 Springboard operations ==
She completed repairs on 30 April 1967 and resumed operations out of Newport, Rhode Island. On 10 August, the ship was again deployed to the Mediterranean. Allagash returned to Newport on 4 February 1968 and, after standdown, participated in the annual "Springboard" exercises and conducted local operations from her base at Newport. Between 22 April and 14 June, she took part in exercises in the northern Atlantic during which she also visited northern European ports. She returned to the Rhode Island coast on 14 June visiting Melville, Rhode Island, and Newport until 19 July. During the remainder of the year, Allagash completed missions off the coasts of Florida and New England. On 6 January 1969, the oiler departed Newport on her final assignment with the U.S. 6th Fleet in the Mediterranean and returned to Newport on 27 July. She spent her final year of service operating off the east coast of the United States.

== Inactivation and decommissioning ==
Allagash was placed in commission, in reserve, at Boston, Massachusetts, on 2 September 1970 to prepare for inactivation. On 21 December 1970, she was decommissioned. Though she remained Navy property, Allagash was turned over to the custody of the Maritime Administration on 13 November 1971 at its James River, Virginia, facility. Her name was struck from the Navy list on 1 June 1973, and she was sold to the Union Minerals & Alloys Corp. on 22 March 1976 for scrapping. Her ship's bell has been preserved as the church bell of St. Michael the Archangel Orthodox Church in Wilmington, Delaware.

== Military awards and honors ==
Allagash was authorized the following medals for World War II:

- World War II Victory Medal
- National Defense Service Medal
- Armed Forces Expeditionary Medal (Cuba)
