= Steelworkers and Shipyard Workers for Equality =

Former labor organization of Black workers

Steelworkers and Shipyard Workers for Equality was a labor organization of Black workers at the Bethlehem Sparrows Point Shipyard in Sparrows Point, Maryland. Founded in the early 1960s, the organization fought for racial equality within the Bethlehem Steel Corporation. The formation of the organization was encouraged by the Congress of Racial Equality (CORE) and the CORE-affiliated Maryland Freedom Union (MFU).

== History ==
Bethlehem Steel maintained racially discriminatory practices and segregated workplaces. Black and white workers had separate toilets and the cleaning of toilets was delegated to Black workers almost exclusively. Bethlehem Steel maintained educational tests that discriminated against Black workers, while white workers did not have to take the same tests and some of the white workers were illiterate.

During the 1970s, the steelworker and shop steward Lee Douglas, Jr. was one of the most active members of the organization. Douglas was the first Black shop steward at the Bethlehem Sparrows Point Shipyard. He maintained a close relationship with Baltimore's Mayor William Donald Schaefer. Francis Brown and Oscar Hoggs were other prominent activists within the organization. At the organization's peak, it maintained a membership of 2,400 dues-paying members. Marches and rallies held by the organization were usually attended by several hundred people. Only a few members of the organization signed onto Kenneth L. Johnson's lawsuit against Bethlehem Steele in 1982. Johnson and the NAACP's Legal Defense Fund filed complaints to the Equal Employment Opportunity Commission alleging that Bethlehem Steel's seniority practices perpetuated discrimination against Black workers. Complaints by Black male workers were later joined by women workers alleging sex discrimination.

Racial discrimination came not only from Bethlehem Steel, but also from the local branches of the United Steelworkers. Black steelworkers in Sparrows Point staged a series of protests. Freedom marches were held at Sparrows Point, at the national Bethlehem Steel headquarters in Pennsylvania, and in front of the Department of Labor in Washington, D.C. These protests were supported by CORE as well as U-JOIN, an offshoot of Students for a Democratic Society (SDS).
