= Cimarron-class oiler (1939) =

U.S. refueling ship design

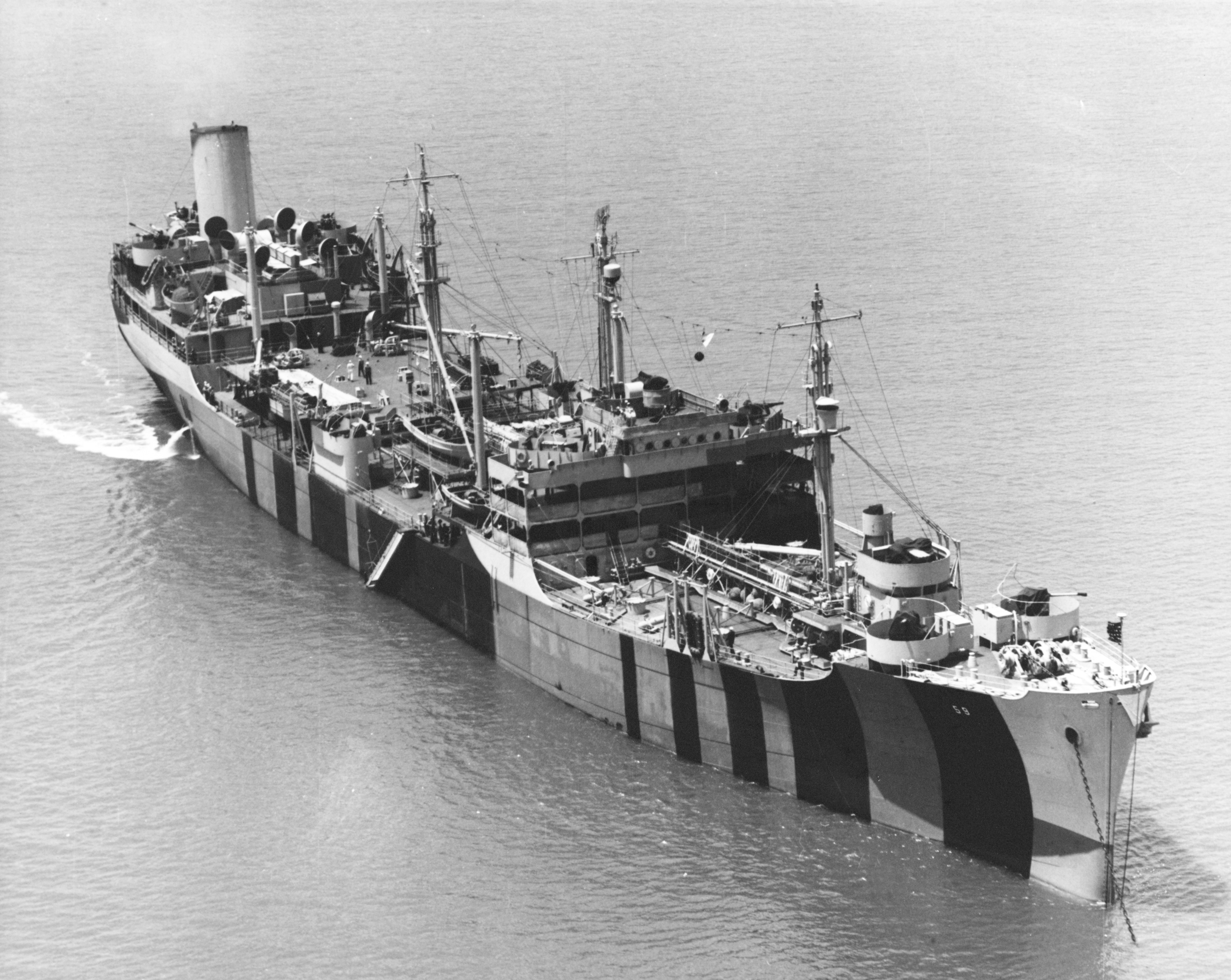
- USS Mississinewa

Class overview
- Name: Cimarron class
- Builders: Bethlehem, Sparrow Point, MD (21); Sun Shipbuilding, PA (8); Newport News Shipbuilding, VA (3); Federal Shipbuilding, NJ (3)
- Operators: United States Navy
- Preceded by: Kaweah class
- Succeeded by: Chicopee class
- Subclasses: Ashtabula class; Mispillon class
- Built: 1938–1945
- In commission: 1939–1992
- Completed: 35, later 4 converted to escort carriers
- Lost: 2
- Retired: 29

General characteristics
- Type: Oil tanker
- Displacement: 7,470 long tons (7,590 t) light; 24,830 long tons (25,228 t) full load
- Length: 553 ft (169 m)
- Beam: 75 ft (23 m)
- Draft: 32 ft 4 in (9.86 m)
- Propulsion: Geared turbines, twin screws, 13,500 shp (10,067 kW)
- Speed: 18 knots (21 mph; 33 km/h)
- Range: 12,100 nmi (22,400 km; 13,900 mi)
- Capacity: 146,000 barrels (23,200 m^{3})
- Complement: 304
- Armament: AO-22 through 33: 4 × 5-inch/38-caliber guns; 4 × twin 40 mm gun mounts; 4 × twin 20 mm gun mounts; AO-51 and later: 1 × 5-inch/38-caliber gun; 4 × 3-inch/50-caliber guns; 4 × twin 40 mm gun mounts; 4 × twin 20 mm gun mounts

General characteristics
- Class & type: Ashtabula-class oiler (Jumboized Cimarron)
- Displacement: 12,840 tons (light); 33,987 tons (full load)
- Length: 644 ft (196 m)
- Beam: 75 ft (23 m)
- Draft: 34 ft 9 in (10.59 m)
- Installed power: 13,500 hp (10,100 kW)
- Propulsion: geared turbines, four boilers, twin screws
- Speed: 16 knots (30 km/h)
- Capacity: 180,000 barrels (29,000 m^{3}) of fuel oil
- Complement: 304 (as USS)
- Crew: 108 civilians plus U.S. Navy detachment (as USNS)
- Notes: "Jumboization" involved the lengthening of the hull and installation of additional cargo capacity during 1965–66

The Cimarron-class oilers were a class of oil tanker capable of handling underway replenishment (refueling of other ships while in motion) which were first built in 1939 as "National Defense Tankers," United States Maritime Commission Type T3-S2-A1, designed "to conform to the approved characteristics for naval auxiliaries in speed, radius and structural strength", anticipating their militarization in the event of war.

Initially the Standard Oil Company of New Jersey had planned to have ten large oiler/tankers built for commercial use. Upon becoming aware of this project the U.S. Maritime Commission took an interest, collaborating with the U.S. Navy to produce a design that would make the ships suitable for military service should the need arise. The size of the order was increased to twelve ships, with three to be built by each of four shipyards, and the Navy picking up just over a quarter of the total cost, to pay for the incorporation of numerous improvements not required for commercial use into the final product. These improvements included speed in excess of commercial requirements; two-compartment floodability and stability; gun foundations; oiling-at-sea gear; heavy lifting equipment; paravane gear; Navy searchlights; extended cruising radius; flexible piping arrangement; and twin screws. Standard Oil of New Jersey was to oversee construction, but no deviation from the Navy/Maritime Commission plans was to be permitted without authorization by those agencies.

"Tentative plans had been reached with the Standard Oil Company of New Jersey to build ten high-speed tankers with the government paying the cost of the larger engines needed for increased speed. By the first week in December [1937], Standard Oil had solicited and received bids from a number of yards providing for the construction of a number of 16,300-ton (deadweight) capacity tankers. Bids were requested for two versions: a single-screw design of 13 knots and a twin-screw design of 18 knots. The price difference between the two would be used to establish the government's cost subsidy for greater speed. Plans and specifications for both designs were prepared for Standard Oil by naval architect E. L. Stewart. It seems certain that the design for the 18-knot tanker (Standard Oil Co. of New Jersey Design No. 652 NDF) evolved out of the bureau's (C&R) design for a fleet oiler", author Thomas Wildenberg wrote in 1996.

Three of the original twelve ships were commissioned directly into the Navy at launch in 1939; the remainder entered merchant service with Standard Oil of New Jersey and Keystone Tankships before being acquired under the Two-Ocean Navy Act of July 1940. A further eighteen were built for the Navy between 1943 and 1946, with five additional units, sometimes called the Mispillion class, built to the slightly larger Type T3-S2-A3 design.

Four of the Cimarrons were converted to escort carriers in 1942; two others were sunk by enemy action.

== Ships ==
Ships in class
Name	Hull number	Builder	Laid down	Launched	Commissioned	Decommissioned	Fate
Cimarron	AO-22	Sun Shipbuilding & Drydock Co.	18 April 1938	7 January 1939	20 March 1939	1 October 1968	Struck 10 October 1968, Sold for scrap 1969
Neosho	AO-23	Federal Shipbuilding and Drydock Company, Kearny, New Jersey	22 June 1938	29 April 1939	7 August 1939	—N/a	Scuttled, Battle of the Coral Sea, 11 May 1942
Platte	AO-24	Bethlehem Shipbuilding Corporation, Sparrow Point Shipyard	14 September 1938	8 July 1939	1 December 1939	19 September 1970	Struck 25 September 1970, Sold for scrap 14 May 1971
Sabine	AO-25	Bethlehem Shipbuilding Corporation, Sparrow Point Shipyard	18 September 1939	27 April 1940	5 December 1940	20 February 1969	Struck 1 December 1976, Sold for scrap 1 August 1983
Salamonie	AO-26	Newport News Shipbuilding	5 February 1940	18 September 1940	28 April 1941	20 December 1968	Struck 2 September 1969, Sold for scrap 24 July 1970
Kaskaskia	AO-27	Newport News Shipbuilding	16 January 1939	29 September 1939	29 October 1940	19 December 1969	Struck 19 December 1969, Sold for scrap 3 August 1970
Sangamon	AO-28	Federal Shipbuilding and Drydock Company, Kearny, New Jersey	13 March 1939	4 November 1939	—N/a		Converted to Sangamon-class escort carrier
Santee	AO-29	Sun Shipbuilding & Dry Dock Co.	31 May 1938	4 March 1939	—N/a		Converted to Sangamon-class escort carrier
Chemung	AO-30	Bethlehem Shipbuilding Corporation, Sparrow Point Shipyard	20 December 1938	9 September 1939	3 July 1941	18 September 1970	Struck 18 December 1970, Sold for scrap 14 May 1971
Chenango	AO-31	Sun Shipbuilding & Dry Dock Co.	10 July 1938	1 April 1939	—N/a		Converted to Sangamon-class escort carrier
Guadalupe	AO-32	Newport News Shipbuilding	8 May 1939	26 January 1940	19 June 1941	15 May 1975	Struck 15 May 1975, Sold for scrap 16 October 1975
Suwannee	AO-33	Federal Shipbuilding and Dry Dock Company, Kearny, New Jersey	3 June 1938	4 March 1939	—N/a		Converted to Sangamon-class escort carrier
Ashtabula	AO-51	Bethlehem Shipbuilding Corporation, Sparrow Point Shipyard	1 October 1942	22 May 1943	7 August 1943	30 September 1982	Struck 6 September 1991, Partially scrapped 1995, expended as SINKEX target ship, 15 October 2000
Cacapon	AO-52	Bethlehem Shipbuilding Corporation, Sparrow Point Shipyard	16 November 1942	12 June 1943	21 September 1943	14 August 1973	Struck 14 August 1973, Sold for scrap 10 December 1973
Caliente	AO-53	Bethlehem Shipbuilding Corporation, Sparrow Point Shipyard	2 January 1943	25 August 1943	12 October 1943	15 December 1973	Struck 15 December 1973, Sold for scrap 5 April 1974
Chikaskia	AO-54	Bethlehem Shipbuilding Corporation, Sparrow Point Shipyard	3 February 1943	2 October 1943	10 November 1943	18 December 1969	1 December 1976, Sold for scrap 26 May 1982
Elokomin	AO-55	Bethlehem Shipbuilding Corporation, Sparrow Point Shipyard	9 March 1943	19 October 1943	30 November 1943	17 March 1970	Struck 17 March 1970, Sold for scrap 2 November 1970
Aucilla	AO-56	Bethlehem Shipbuilding Corporation, Sparrow Point Shipyard	25 May 1943	20 November 1943	22 December 1943	18 December 1970	Struck 1 December 1976, Sold for scrap, 25 October 1992
Marias	AO-57	Bethlehem Shipbuilding Corporation, Sparrow Point Shipyard	15 June 1943	21 December 1943	12 February 1944	22 November 1982	Struck 12 December 1992, Sold for scrap 18 September 1995
Manatee	AO-58	Bethlehem Shipbuilding Corporation, Sparrow Point Shipyard	28 August 1943	18 February 1944	6 April 1944	14 August 1973	Struck 14 August 1973, Sold for scrap 10 December 1973
Mississinewa	AO-59	Bethlehem Shipbuilding Corporation, Sparrow Point Shipyard	5 October 1943	28 March 1944	19 May 1944	—N/a	Sunk on 20 November 1944
Nantahala	AO-60	Bethlehem Shipbuilding Corporation, Sparrow Point Shipyard	31 October 1943	29 April 1944	19 June 1944	2 July 1973	Struck 1 July 1973, Sold for scrap 5 March 1975
Severn	AO-61	Bethlehem Shipbuilding Corporation, Sparrow Point Shipyard	24 November 1943	31 May 1944	19 July 1944	1 July 1973	Struck 1 July 1974, Sold for scrap 22 January 1975
Taluga	AO-62	Bethlehem Shipbuilding Corporation, Sparrow Point Shipyard	23 December 1943	10 July 1944	25 August 1944	4 May 1972	Struck 21 February 1992, Sold for scrap 1 July 2010
Chipola	AO-63	Bethlehem Shipbuilding Corporation, Sparrow Point Shipyard	3 May 1944	21 October 1944	30 November 1944	14 August 1973	Struck 14 August 1973, Sold for scrap 15 July 1974
Tolovana	AO-64	Bethlehem Shipbuilding Corporation, Sparrow Point Shipyard	5 June 1944	6 January 1945	24 February 1945	15 April 1975	Struck 15 April 1975, Sold for scrap 16 October 1975
Allagash	AO-97	Bethlehem Shipbuilding Corporation, Sparrow Point Shipyard	26 October 1944	14 April 1945	21 August 1945	21 December 1970	Struck 1 June 1973, Sold for scrap 22 March 1976
Caloosahatchee	AO-98	Bethlehem Shipbuilding Corporation, Sparrow Point Shipyard	30 November 1944	2 June 1945	10 October 1945	28 February 1990	Struck 18 July 1994, Sold for scrap to Able UK and towed to Hartlepool UK, 2003. Scrapping complete, April 2010.
Canisteo	AO-99	Bethlehem Shipbuilding Corporation, Sparrow Point Shipyard	11 January 1945	6 July 1945	3 December 1945	2 October 1989	Struck 31 August 1992, Sold for scrap to Able UK and towed to Hartlepool UK, 2003. Scrapping complete, August 2010.
Chukawan	AO-100	Bethlehem Shipbuilding Corporation, Sparrow Point Shipyard	25 January 1945	28 August 1945	22 January 1946	13 June 1972	Struck 1 July 1972, Sold for scrap 1 March 1973

=== Mispillion and Ashtabula subclasses ===
There is some controversy about the MARAD Type T3-S2-A3 oilers being a class of their own, the Mispillion class. This is further complicated by the fact that these ships were jumboized in the 1960s, together with Ashtabula (AO-51), Caloosahatchee (AO-98), and Canisteo (AO-99), for some then comprising the Ashtabula class – sometimes with or without the Mispillions. Adding to the confusion, some sources refer to the 18 war-construction repeat Cimarrons as the Ashtabula class.

The argument for separation of Ashtabula, Caloosahatchee, and Canisteo as a separate class from Mispillion, Navasota, Passumpsic, Pawcatuck, and Waccamaw can be made by comparing the actual design and equipment of the two groups. The Ashtabulas and Mispillions are quite different in appearance and UNREP equipment. The three Ashtabulas have a fully enclosed well deck, no exterior deck walkways on the forward superstructure, a tunnel through the forward superstructure to allow the movement of cargo to the forward deck, two sets of STREAM gear, the second being forward of the forward superstructure, and no helo deck on the bow. The Mispillions have none of these features.

Ships in class
Name	Hull number	Builder	Laid down	Launched	Commissioned	Jumboized	Decommissioned	Fate
Mispillion	AO-105	Sun Shipbuilding & Drydock Co.	14 February 1945	10 August 1945	29 December 1945	1965-66	1990	Struck 15 February 1995, Sold for scrap December 2011
Navasota	AO-106	Sun Shipbuilding & Drydock Co.	22 February 1945	30 August 1945	27 February 1946	1963-64	1991	Struck 2 January 1992, Sold for scrap 25 October 1995
Passumpsic	AO-107	Sun Shipbuilding & Drydock Co.	8 March 1945	31 October 1945	1 April 1946	1964-65	1991	Struck 17 December 1991 or 18 December 1991, Sold for scrap 19 December 1991
Pawcatuck	AO-108	Sun Shipbuilding & Drydock Co.	22 March 1945	19 February 1946	10 May 1946	1965-66	1991	Struck 21 September 1991, Sold for scrap 21 September 2005
Waccamaw	AO-109	Sun Shipbuilding & Drydock Co.	28 April 1945	30 March 1946	25 June 1946	1964-65	1989	Struck 11 October 1991, Sold for scrap and towed to Brownsville, TX, 11 October 2005.

=== Jumboization ===
From 1964 through 1967, eight of the T3 type oilers were "jumboized" in order to increase their capacity to 180,000 barrels, which the Navy considered the amount necessary to support a supercarrier and its jet air wing's fuel needs. The conversion of the Mispillion sub-class was designed under project SCB 223, while that of the Ashtabula sub-class was designed under SCB 706. This jumboization was done by cutting the ships in two with cutting torches, then the aft section was pulled away, and new mid-body moved in and welded to the bows and sterns. After many other cutting and welding modifications a new long ship was created; a helipad was also fitted forward on the five Mispillions. Ashtabula, Caloosahatchee and Canisteo were jumboized after the five Mispillions and were given a limited capacity for ammunition and dry stores as well as a new midships superstructure and full scantlings, whereas AO-105 through 109 retained their shelter-deck configuration.

== Importance ==
The US Navy's mastery of underway replenishment and its ability to refuel the fleet at sea without returning to port was a major factor in its successful operations against the Japanese during the Second World War. As the largest and fastest of the Navy's oilers, the Cimarrons were the principal class employed in direct support of the task forces. Many of the Cimarron class continued to sustain this function through the Korean and Vietnam wars as well, with the "jumbos" serving right up to the Persian Gulf War.

US Navy captains who had flight status ("wings") were eligible to command aircraft carriers, but it was a prerequisite that the officer in question first have a "deep-draft" command; accordingly the Navy assigned these officers to oilers which had a similar draft.
