= USS Taluga =

Oiler of the United States Navy

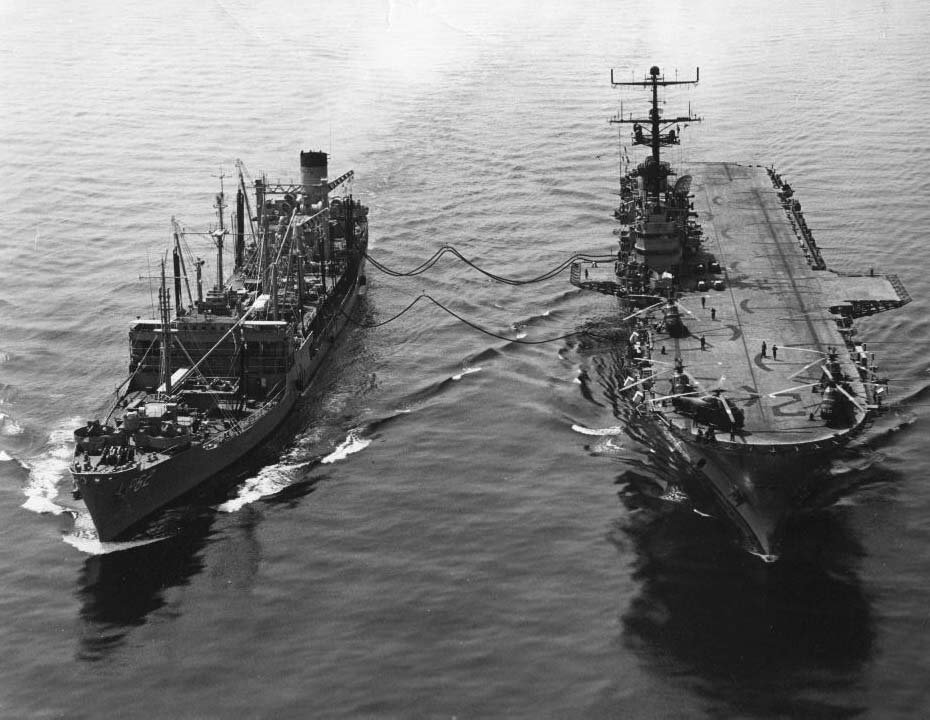
- USS Taluga refueling USS Iwo Jima

History

United States
- Name: USS Taluga
- Namesake: Taluga River in Florida
- Builder: Bethlehem Sparrows Point Shipyard
- Laid down: 23 December 1943
- Launched: 10 July 1944
- Commissioned: 25 August 1944
- Decommissioned: 4 May 1972
- Reclassified: USNS Taluga (T-AO-62)
- Stricken: 21 February 1992
- Identification: IMO number: 7737119
- Honours and awards: 4 battle stars (WWII); 4 battle stars (Korea); 6 battle stars (Vietnam)
- Fate: Transferred to MARAD, 1 May 1999, sold for scrap July, 2010

General characteristics
- Class & type: Cimarron-class fleet oiler
- Type: T3-S2-A3 tanker hull
- Displacement: 7,236 long tons (7,352 t) light; 25,425 long tons (25,833 t) fully laden
- Length: 553 ft (169 m)
- Beam: 75 ft (23 m)
- Draft: 32 ft (9.8 m)
- Propulsion: Geared turbines 30,400 hp (22,669 kW), twin screws
- Speed: 18 knots (33 km/h; 21 mph)
- Capacity: 146,000 barrels
- Complement: 314
- Armament: 1 × single 5"/38 caliber gun; 4 × single 3"/50 caliber guns; 4 × twin 40 mm AA guns; 4 × twin 20 mm AA guns

USS Taluga (AO-62) was a Cimarron-class fleet oiler acquired by the U.S. Navy during World War II. She served primarily in the Pacific Ocean Theater of Operations, and provided petroleum products where needed to combat ships. She was awarded four battle stars during World War II, four during the Korean War and six campaign stars during the Vietnam War.

Taluga was laid down under a Maritime Commission contract (MC hull 728) on 23 December 1943 at Sparrows Point, Maryland, by the Bethlehem Steel Co.; launched on 10 July 1944; sponsored by Mrs. Harvey Klemmer; delivered to the Navy at Norfolk, Virginia, on 25 August 1944; and commissioned there on that same day.

== World War II Pacific Theatre operations ==
The oiler left Norfolk, Virginia, on 5 October; stopped at Aruba, Netherlands West Indies, from the 9th to the 11th; and transited the Panama Canal on the night of 13 and 14 October. She reached Pearl Harbor on the 26th and, two days later, continued on to the Marshalls. The oiler entered the Eniwetok lagoon on 26 November and exited on the 28th. On 10 December, she reached Ulithi, which served as her base of operations until the end of World War II.

For the next 11 months, Taluga was in and out of Ulithi picking up oil and other supplies there and carrying them to units of the U.S. Pacific Fleet. For the most part, her oil and aviation gasoline went to the ships of the Fast Carrier Task Force.

== Supporting Allied landings ==
During that time, she supported the carrier strikes and landings on Luzon, the Okinawa landings, the strikes on Formosa, and the final 3rd Fleet sweep of the Japanese home islands in the summer of 1945. Between April and July 1945, she spent much of her time in and around the anchorage at Kerama Retto, just west of the southern end of Okinawa. There, on 16 April, she encountered her greatest excitement of the war.

== Under attack by kamikaze planes ==
Shortly after dawn, ten kamikazes attacked her formation. One of them dove at the oiler, strafed her deck, and then made for her superstructure. The attacker careened off the ship's bridge and exploded through her forward well deck into a compartment adjacent to her tanks brimming with 300,000 gallons of aviation fuel. However, only 12 men were injured; and the oiler was soon back in action.

== End-of-war activity ==
Soon after the final 3rd Fleet sweep of Hokkaidō and Kyūshū, Japan capitulated. Taluga, entered Tokyo Bay on 26 August, 11 days following the cessation of hostilities, and took up duty as station oiler until early October. She then voyaged to Ulithi once more to refill her tanks and returned to Japan for duty as station oiler at Yokosuka. On 18 November, she departed that port to support ships engaged in the occupation of China and Korea. She visited Qingdao and Jinsen before returning to Yokosuka, Japan, on 6 December. On 31 January 1946, the oiler put to sea to return to the United States. She arrived in San Pedro, California, on 16 February and commenced a four-month yard period.

== East coast operations ==
Following overhaul, she sailed from San Pedro on 15 June for the Far East. For the next year, Taluga hauled oil from the Persian Gulf ports of Bahrain and Ras Tanura to American bases in Japan and the Philippines. On 13 June 1947, she got underway from Yokosuka, Japan, bound for home by the westward route. During that cruise, the oiler visited Singapore and Bahrain before transiting the Suez Canal and stopping at Tangier. On 10 August, she entered port at Norfolk. Three weeks later, the oiler was back at sea and - after an overnight stop at Key West, Florida - headed for the Mediterranean. She loaded oil at Bahrain from 30 September until 2 October and, following visits to Suez and Tangier, returned to Norfolk on 28 October.

On 4 November, she departed Hampton Roads once more for a cruise to the Middle East. She stopped at Ras Tanura from 30 November to 5 December; then she continued eastward across the Indian Ocean and up through the South China Sea to Yokosuka, Japan, arriving there on the day after Christmas. On the last day of 1947, Taluga departed Yokosuka and set a course across the Pacific to Puget Sound, Washington. She reached her destination on 13 January 1948 and began overhaul at the naval shipyard.

== Diversity of operations ==
Taluga completed overhaul and departed Puget Sound on 19 April. For the next three years, the oiler plied the oceans carrying oil to various American bases the world over. During that period, she made short runs between ports on both coasts as well as long voyages to ports overseas. She served with the 6th Fleet in the Mediterranean on occasion and stopped frequently at the Persian Gulf ports, Ras Tanura and Bahrain. The oiler called most frequently at San Diego, San Pedro, Long Beach, and Seattle, Washington, on the U.S. West Coast; Norfolk on the east coast; as well as Galveston, Texas, Houston, Texas, Cristóbal, Panama, Guantánamo Bay, and Aruba in the gulf and West Indies areas. On 12 May 1951, Taluga departed San Francisco and, during the next month and one-half, made two voyages between California and Alaska. On the first, she made a circuit from Adak to Dutch Harbor to Kodiak before returning to San Francisco on 31 May. The second Alaskan voyage took her to Adak and Kodiak and was completed on 3 July. During the following months, she shuttled between California ports before departing the west coast for the Far East on 30 July.

== Korean War operations ==
While Taluga was shuttling oil to bases throughout the world, trouble was brewing in the Far East. On the morning of 25 June 1950, the North Korean People's Army invaded the Republic of Korea. American and other UN troops pushed the North Koreans back as far as the Yalu River; and, by winter, the war appeared to be all but over. However, the renewal of the war by the injection of communist Chinese troops required the United States to increase its flow of men and material to strengthen the sagging defenses. By the summer of 1951, Taluga was on her way again to join in another Asian war.

She departed Long Beach late in July; stopped at Midway Island and Kwajalein; and reached Sasebo, Japan, on 23 August. The oiler remained there for a month, then headed for the combat zone on 22 September. Operating from Sasebo at the southwestern tip of Kyūshū, Taluga supported the blockade and siege of Wonsan and Songj in almost until the end of hostilities. She ranged up and down the eastern coast of Korea supplying oil and aviation fuel to the warships conducting operations along the coast. From March to September 1952, she returned to the west coast and conducted operations between San Diego and Long Beach. She returned to Korean waters in October and, after almost three months of operations in support of UN naval forces, moved south to Taiwan where she visited Keelung and Kaohsiung and supported the Taiwan Strait Patrol.

== Peacetime deployment ==
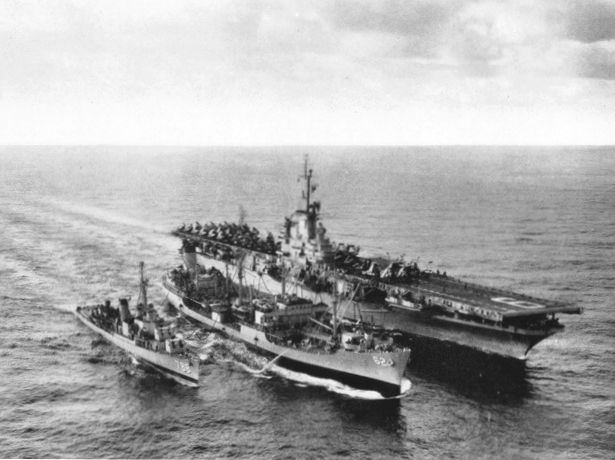
Taluga refueling USS Essex and USS Hollister, 1954

In April 1953, Taluga sailed from Yokosuka, Japan, via Pearl Harbor, and arrived in San Pedro, California, early in May. She operated along the west coast, visiting San Diego and Long Beach, until mid-August. On the 17th, she got underway from Long Beach on the first peacetime deployment with the 7th Fleet in a series which lasted until the escalation of the Vietnam War brought the return of a substantial American presence back to the Asian continent.

== Tachen Islands evacuation support ==
Interspersed among the routine operations of those deployments were several operations of note — ones which might have presaged the increasing American involvement in Southeast Asia. During the winter of 1954 and 1955, the oiler participated in the evacuation of Chinese Nationalists from the Tachen Islands located just off the mainland. In January 1955, she took station off Henriette Passe, near Haiphong, to fuel the transport and relief supply ships evacuating refugees from strife-torn North Vietnam during the latter stages of Operation Passage to Freedom, instituted in the wake of the Geneva agreements which followed the French defeat at Dien Bien Phu.

== Vietnam operations ==
Soon thereafter, Taluga resumed a series of deployments with the 7th Fleet for another 10 years. In 1965, the United States began expanding its direct participation in the Vietnam War. Taluga's remaining deployments, therefore, were wartime deployments in or near a combat zone. During the ensuing six years, Taluga deployed to the western Pacific six times.

On each occasion, she saw service in the war zone along the Vietnamese coast replenishing units of the 7th Fleet operating off the coast. She fueled the larger units as they supported the large carriers conducting strikes inland, and she offered support to the smaller units engaged in Operation Market Time, the interdiction of North Vietnamese coastal logistics and infiltration. Her proximity to the Vietnamese War Zone coast and pulling into Vietnam harbor qualifies Veterans for BlueWater Veteran's benefits. Only once did she depart from her schedule of western Pacific deployments alternated with west coast operations and yard overhauls. That occasion came at the end of her 1970 deployment when she sailed south of the equator to Australia and New Zealand, where she joined in LONGEX-70, the New Zealand annual maritime exercise.

== Converted to MSTS experimental use ==
Taluga completed her final deployment as a commissioned Navy ship at Long Beach on 13 November 1971. She conducted operations along the coast for another six months. On 4 May 1972, the oiler was decommissioned and turned over to the Military Sealift Command to participate in a pilot program designed to test the feasibility of reducing the number of Navy men serving in oilers. The operation, named Operation Charger Log II, was an unqualified success. For the next three and one-half years, her crew — made up of 105 civilians and 16 military men — maneuvered her through 875 underway replenishments in support of the 7th Fleet in the Far East. In late February 1976, she cleared the western Pacific for Oakland, California, where she was placed in a ready-reserve status incident to overhaul. USNS Taluga completed overhaul in October 1976 and was then reactivated as a fleet support ship assigned to the 3rd Fleet in the eastern Pacific. She served in that capacity into October 1979.

== Final decommissioning ==
She was placed out of service (date unknown). She was struck from the Naval Vessel Register, 21 February 1992, and transferred to the Maritime Administration (MARAD) for lay up in the National Defense Reserve Fleet, Suisun Bay, Benicia, California. Her title was transferred to MARAD on 1 May 1999.

On 1 July 2010, the ship was moved from the Suisun Bay Reserve Fleet to the BAE Systems' shipyard in San Francisco where she was drydocked for cleaning prior to an ocean tow through the Panama Canal to Brownsville, Texas for scrapping.

== Awards ==
Taluga earned four battle stars during World War II:

- Leyte operation
- Luzon operation
- Okinawa Gunto operation
- 3rd Fleet operations against Japan

During the Korean War:

- UN Summer-Fall Offensive
- Second Korean Winter
- Korean Defense Summer-Fall 1952
- Third Korean Winter

During Vietnam:

- Vietnam Defense
- Vietnam Summer-Fall 1969
- Vietnam Winter-Spring 1970
- Sanctuary Counteroffensive
- Vietnamese Counteroffensive - Phase VII
- Consolidation I
