= Bethlehem Sparrows Point Shipyard =

Site in Sparrows Point, Maryland, US

Coordinates: 39°13′7.1″N 76°29′24.4″W

Bethlehem Steel mill at Sparrows Point, Maryland (1940)

The Bethlehem Sparrows Point Shipyard was a shipyard founded as Maryland Steel in Sparrows Point, Maryland, US, in 1887 and still in operation in the 2020s under new ownership and a new name. It was first acquired by Bethlehem Shipbuilding Corporation in 1916 and renamed the Bethlehem Sparrows Point Shipyard. It was sold in 1997 to Baltimore Marine Industries Inc. In 2012, it was owned by Barletta Industries, which had converted it to the Sparrows Point Shipyard and Industrial Complex. As of 2021, it is owned by Sparrows Point Terminal, LLC, and has been renamed Tradepoint Atlantic.

== History ==
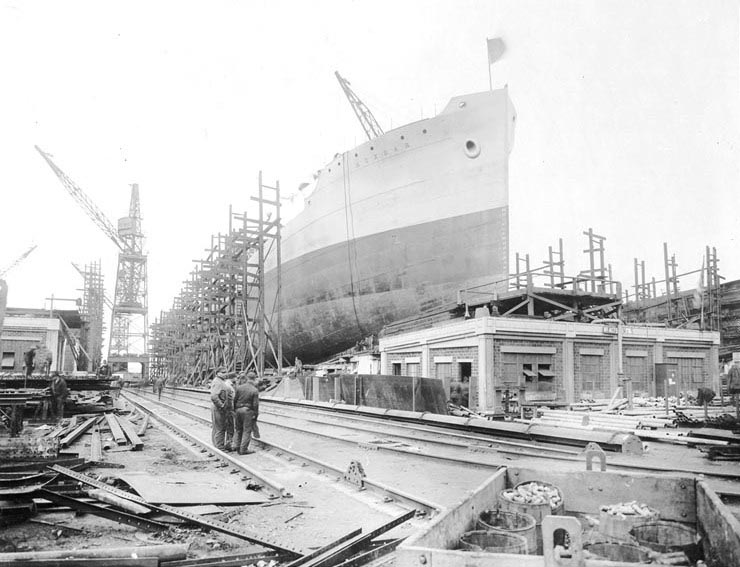
The S.S. Hoxbar ready for launch at Sparrows Point on February 15, 1919

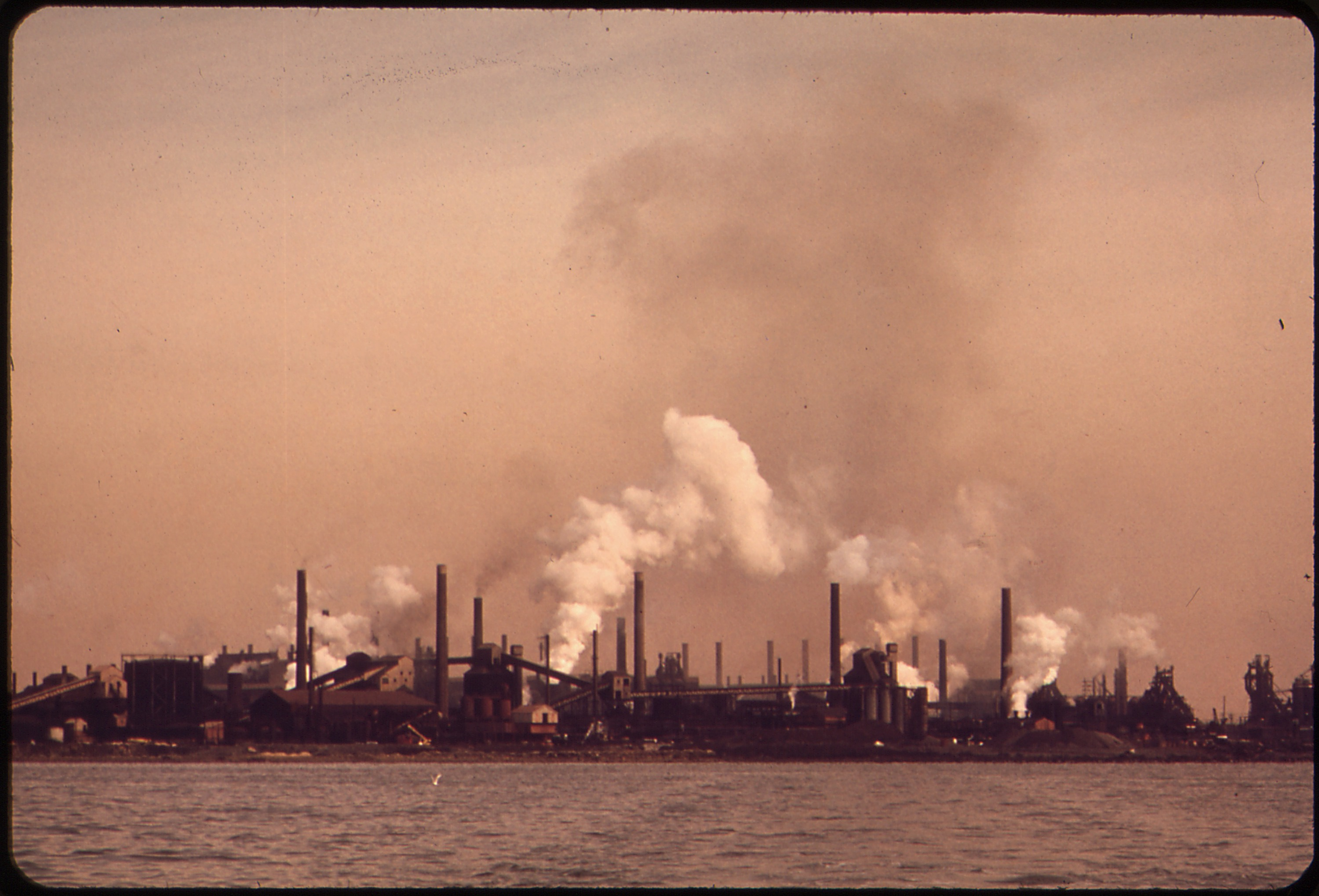
The Bethehem Steel plant at Sparrows Point in 1973

Maryland Steel built tugs, coastal passengers, dredges, cargo ships, and a few destroyers. It was purchased by Bethlehem Steel, which used it to service and repair ships and manufacture industrial products. The shipyard launched the Shawmut, later renamed Ancon, which in 1914 made the first official transit of the Panama Canal.

Facilities at the yard included a graving dock, a floating drydock and two full-service outfitting piers that together provided nearly 3,000 feet of berthing space.

=== World War II ===
During World War II, the Sparrows Point Shipyard built ships, particularly Liberty ships, as part of the U.S. government's Emergency Shipbuilding Program to help re-build the British Merchant Navy. The shipyard also constructed 21 Cimarron-class oilers from 1938 to 1946.

Once part of a chain of 17 shipyards operating under BethShip, the Sparrows Point Shipyard was the only location remaining by 1990.

=== Baltimore Marine Industries, Inc. ===
In October 1997, the shipyard was sold to the Veritas Capital Fund, a New York-based merchant banking and investment firm which built a $300 million cold rolling mill complex on the site which opened in 1999. Veritas reorganized the facility as Baltimore Marine Industries, Inc. (BMI) and won two US Navy contracts for new ship construction and dismantling of older tonnage.

Although BMI was selected to build a fleet of deluxe cruise ships, the cruise line was never able to secure financing. With no orders on the horizon and no work aside from the two modest Navy contracts, BMI collapsed in bankruptcy in 2003.

=== Barletta Industries ===
All assets were purchased by Barletta Industries Inc. in 2004 and reorganized as the Sparrows Point Shipyard and Industrial Complex. Barletta claims it has modernized the infrastructure and refurbished the yard to prepare for leasing specific yard structures, buildings and land to companies in maritime and heavy industry.

=== Liquidation ===
The plant continued to change hands, from ArcelorMittal to Severstal (for $810 million) to Renco Group (R.G. Steel; for $1.2 billion) and finally to liquidator Hilco Trading in 2012 (for $72 million). Hilco sold the plant's cold mill to Nucor in 2013. The blast furnace was demolished in January 2015.

The property is now owned by Sparrows Point Terminal, LLC, a partnership of Hilco and Redwood Capital Investments, which has renamed it "Tradepoint Atlantic". The site has been granted "zoning flexibility" and Enterprise Zone tax credits.

== See also ==
- Bethlehem Steel
- Steelworkers and Shipyard Workers for Equality
