= SS Conastoga =

SS Conastoga may refer to one of three Type T2 tankers built for the United States Maritime Commission during World War II:

- SS Conastoga (1942) (MC hull number 147, Type T2), built by Bethlehem Sparrows Point Shipyard; acquired by the United States Navy and converted to Kennebec-class oiler USS Lackawanna (AO-40); sold for commercial use in 1947; scrapped in 1966
- SS Conastoga (MC hull number 350) (Type T2-SE-A1), built by Sun Shipbuilding; laid down as King's Mountain, but launched as Conastoga, 21 January 1943; acquired by the United States Navy and converted to Suamico-class oiler USS Millicoma (AO-73); converted to floating power station for United States Army use in 1954; placed in National Defense Reserve Fleet in 1975; scrapped in 1987
- SS Conastoga (MC hull number 352) (Type T2-SE-A1), built by Sun Shipbuilding; laid down as Hobkirk's Hill, but launched as Conastoga, 31 January 1943; delivered February 1943; sold private in 1946; lengthened in 1954; broken up in 1993
