= SS Corsicana =

SS Corsicana may refer to one of two Type T2 tankers built for the United States Maritime Commission:

- SS Corsicana (1941) (MC hull number 142, Type T2), built by Bethlehem Sparrows Point Shipyard; acquired by the United States Navy and converted to Kennebec-class oiler USS Kennebec (AO-36); placed in National Defense Reserve Fleet in 1970; scrapped in 1982
- SS Corsicana (1942) (MC hull number 321, Type T2-SE-A1), built by Sun Shipbuilding; laid down as Oriskany, but launched as Corsicana, August 1942; acquired by the United States Navy and converted to Suamico-class oiler USS Pecos (AO-65); placed in National Defense Reserve Fleet in 1974; scrapped in 1975
