= SS Caddo =

SS Caddo may refer to one of two Type T2 tankers built for the United States Maritime Commission for the Socony-Vacuum Oil Company:

- SS Caddo (1941) (MC hull number 143, Type T2), built by Bethlehem Sparrows Point Shipyard; acquired by the United States Navy and converted to Kennebec-class oiler USS Merrimack (AO-37); placed in National Defense Reserve Fleet in 1959; scrapped in 1982
- SS Caddo (1942) (MC hull number 318, Type T2-SE-A1), built by Sun Shipbuilding; laid down as Dorchester Heights, but purchased by Socony-Vacuum by May 1942 delivery; sunk by U-518 on 23 November 1942; 8 survivors of the 59 men aboard
