= USS Mattaponi =

Oiler of the United States Navy

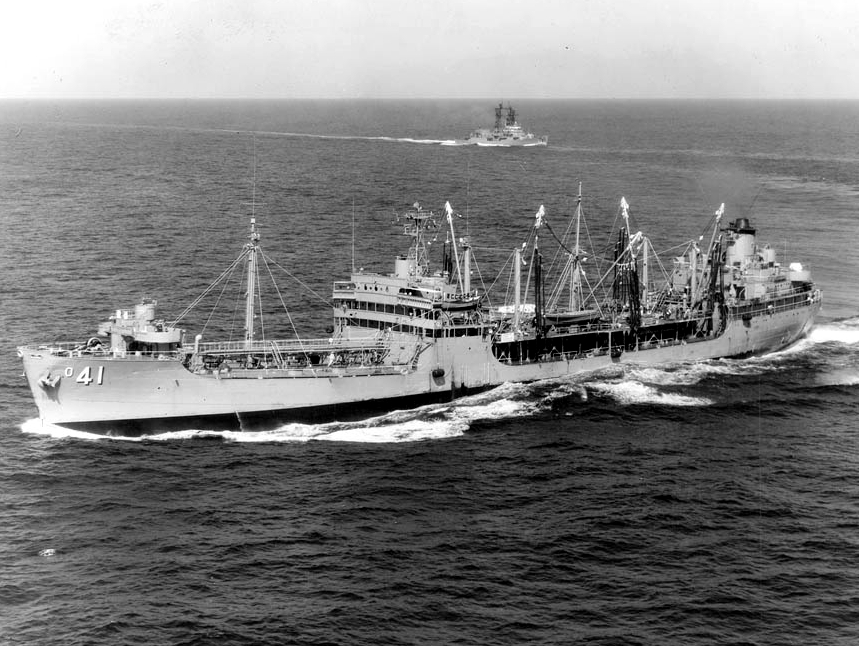
- Mattaponi in the Gulf of Tonkin, 18 December 1968

History

United States
- Name: USS Mattaponi
- Namesake: Mattaponi River
- Builder: Sun Shipbuilding & Drydock Co., Chester, Pennsylvania
- Launched: 17 January 1942
- Commissioned: 11 May 1942
- Decommissioned: 17 April 1950
- Recommissioned: 28 December 1950
- Decommissioned: 12 October 1954
- Recommissioned: 12 December 1956
- Decommissioned: 11 November 1957
- Stricken: 1 February 1959
- Reinstated: 1 September 1961
- Recommissioned: 30 November 1962
- Decommissioned: 1970
- Stricken: October 1970
- Honors and awards: 5 campaign stars (Vietnam)
- Fate: Transferred to the Maritime Administration for disposal, 22 January 1971; Sold for scrapping, 15 December 1973

General characteristics
- Class & type: Mattaponi class oiler
- Type: MARAD T2-A
- Tonnage: 16,400 DWT
- Displacement: 21,750 tons
- Length: 520 ft (160 m)
- Beam: 68 ft (21 m)
- Draft: 29 ft 11.5 in (9.131 m)
- Depth: 37 ft (11 m)
- Installed power: 12,000 shp (8,900 kW)
- Propulsion: geared steam turbine; single screw
- Speed: 16.5 knots (30.6 km/h)
- Range: 7,200 nmi (13,300 km; 8,300 mi)
- Capacity: 133,000 bbl (~18,100 t)
- Complement: 242
- Armament: 1 × single 5"/38 caliber dual purpose gun; 4 × single 3"/50 caliber dual purpose guns; 4 × twin 40 mm AA guns

USS Mattaponi (AO-41) was a Kennebec-class oiler which served in the United States Navy during World War II, periodically during the 1950s, and in the Vietnam War. She was the only U.S. Navy ship named for the Mattaponi River in eastern Virginia.

== Service history ==
=== 1942–1945 ===
Mattaponi was laid down as SS Kalkay, a type T2-A tanker. The ship was built at Sun Shipbuilding & Drydock Co. in Chester, Pennsylvania as hull number 222 and USMC number 149, and launched on 17 January 1942. The ship was commissioned into the U.S. Navy on 11 May 1942.

Mattaponi spent almost all of World War II in the Atlantic and Mediterranean theaters. From her commissioning until December 1942 she carried fuel from the Texas oil ports to the U.S. Navy's fuel storage depots at Craney Island, Yorktown, Newport, Boston, and Casco Bay. On 12 December she departed New York Harbor for the first of 21 wartime transatlantic convoys. Often she carried, in addition to her cargo fuels, landing craft, aircraft, provisions, mail, medical supplies, and passengers. Her medical complement as well as her engineers and mechanics were often called on, at sea and in port, to remedy malfunctions, human and mechanical, on board other ships.

The tanker's convoy voyages during this period took her to Casablanca, Oran, Bizerte, Rosneath, Derry, Fayal, and Port Royal in addition to frequent runs to the Texas and Caribbean oil centers.

After 10 December 1944, Mattaponi's transatlantic crossings became less frequent due to a change in logistic tactics. Navy tankers no longer accompanied convoys, but were assigned, instead, to stand by at terminal points on either side of the Atlantic, rendezvousing and servicing convoy escorts as they passed the stations. Mattaponi was assigned, from 10 December 1944 to 28 May 1945, to a group which rotated between Bermuda and the Azores as terminus tankers.

On 11 July 1945, following a month's availability at Portsmouth, Virginia, Mattaponi departed Norfolk for duty with the 3rd Fleet in the Pacific. She arrived at Pearl Harbor the day after the cessation of hostilities and continued on to the Carolines, anchoring in Ulithi Harbor on 28 August.

=== 1945–1950 ===
With the exception of two voyages to Pearl Harbor in December 1945 and January 1946, the tanker serviced the fleet in the western Pacific until January 1947. During this period she made three runs to the Persian Gulf for the products with which to fuel the ships at Yokosuka, Sasebo, Jinsen, Fusan, Taku, Tsingtao, and Manila.

On 20 January 1947 she arrived San Francisco for overhaul. She departed on 20 April for further extended periods of duty on the high seas. During the next two and a half years, interrupted by overhaul August to December 1948, Mattaponi completed two round-the-world voyages in addition to making numerous runs to the Persian Gulf and one to Aruba from such ports as Yokosuka, Sasebo, Buckner Bay, Manila, Piraeus, Taranto, and Norfolk.

On 21 October 1949, she entered the San Francisco Naval Shipyard for inactivation. In December she proceeded to San Diego, was immediately placed in the Reserve Fleet, and later decommissioned on 17 April 1950.

=== 1950–1954 ===
Soon recommissioned, after the outbreak of the Korean War, on 28 December 1950, Mattaponi served for almost four years as a Military Sea Transport Service vessel with the designation T‑AO‑41. Until June 1951 she operated primarily along the U.S. west coast, making one voyage to Japan in March. From June through September she carried fuel from Aruba to east coast ports, making one run to Iceland before returning to the west coast. With one interruption, a cruise to the Marshalls, August to September 1953, she continued to operate off the west coast with periodic voyages to the Aleutian and Hawaiian Islands until decommissioning again 12 October 1954. She then reentered the Reserve Fleet at San Diego.

=== 1956–1957 ===
On 12 December 1956 Mattaponi was recommissioned. In service for the next 11 months, she made one round-the-world voyage, several runs to Bahrain from Norfolk, Sasebo, Japan, and Pozzuoli, Italy, and one between Aruba and Norfolk as well as a cruise to Cherbourg, France, and Invergordon, Scotland, before mooring at New Orleans on 10 November 1957. There, the next day, she decommissioned. On 1 February 1959 her name was stricken from the Navy List.

=== 1961–1970 ===
Mattaponi was reinstated on the Navy List on 1 September 1961, and recommissioned for a third time at Mobile, Alabama on 30 November 1962. Home-ported at San Francisco, she spent all of 1962 on the west coast. On 2 July 1963, she departed for the western Pacific where she serviced ships of the 7th Fleet in the Japanese, Philippine, and East and South China Seas. Returning to the west coast on 14 January 1964, she spent the remainder of that year in operations in the eastern Pacific, including joint exercises involving United States and Canadian naval units. From January to July 1965, Mattaponi again deployed for duty with the 7th Fleet.

In 1966 she operated off the west coast until 28 March, when she commenced overhaul in Richmond, California. Her overhaul completed on 27 July, Mattaponi resumed underway operations along the west coast. On 3 September the veteran oiler left San Francisco for the West Pacific, providing services for the 7th Fleet until the end of March 1967. She arrived back at San Francisco on 17 April.

While in support of Naval operations in the South China Sea in December 1967, the Mattaponi delivered Christmas trees to ships at sea during refueling operations.

Mattaponi operated locally out of her home port through most of the summer, then departed again 8 September for duty off Vietnam, returning on 17 April 1968. After a leave and upkeep period, followed by local operations, she left once more for the Far East in early October, and was providing services to the fleet there into 1969 and 1970.

=== Decommissioning and sale ===
Mattaponi was decommissioned in 1970 and stricken from the Naval Vessel Register in October of the same year. She was transferred to the Maritime Administration on 22 January 1971, for disposal, and sold for scrapping, on 15 December 1973, to Union Minerals and Alloys Corporation, New York City, for $50,184.50 and subsequently scrapped.

Mattaponi's bell is currently on loan from the Naval Historical Center to the Fluer de Lis Chapel in Upland, California. The chapel, used for wedding ceremonies, rings the ship's bell after each ceremony.
