= USS Neches (AO-47) =

Oiler of the United States Navy

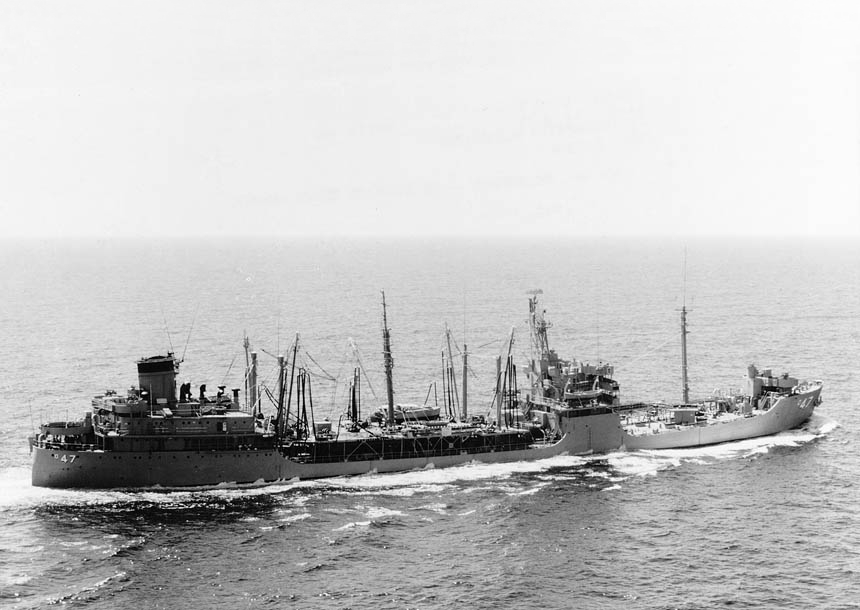
- USS Neches underway near Subic Bay on 18 February 1970

History

United States
- Name: USS Neches
- Namesake: Neches River
- Builder: Sun Shipbuilding & Drydock Co., Chester, Pennsylvania
- Laid down: 12 June 1941
- Launched: 11 October 1941
- Acquired: 20 July 1941
- Commissioned: 16 September 1942
- Decommissioned: 10 July 1950
- Recommissioned: 3 January 1951
- Decommissioned: June 1955
- Recommissioned: 24 November 1961
- Decommissioned: 1970
- Stricken: 1 October 1970
- Honors and awards: 9 battle stars (World War II)
- Fate: Sold for scrapping, 1 December 1973

General characteristics
- Class & type: Mattaponi class oiler
- Type: MARAD T2-A
- Tonnage: 16,400 DWT
- Displacement: 21,750 tons
- Length: 520 ft (160 m)
- Beam: 68 ft (21 m)
- Draft: 29 ft 11.5 in (9.131 m)
- Depth: 37 ft (11 m)
- Installed power: 12,000 shp (8,900 kW)
- Propulsion: geared steam turbine; single screw
- Speed: 16.5 knots (30.6 km/h)
- Range: 7,200 nmi (13,300 km; 8,300 mi)
- Capacity: 133,000 bbl (~18,100 t)
- Complement: 242
- Armament: 1942 : 1 × single 5"/38 caliber dual purpose gun; 4 × single 3"/50 caliber dual purpose guns; 4 × twin 40 mm AA guns; 1968 : 2 × single 3"/50 caliber dual purpose guns forward

USS Neches (AO-47) was a Kennebec-class oiler in the United States Navy during World War II and the Vietnam War. She was the second U.S. Navy ship named for the Neches River in eastern Texas.

== Construction and commissioning ==
Neches was laid down as type T2-A tanker SS Aekay, M.C. hull 148 on 12 June 1941 by Sun Shipbuilding and Drydock Co. of Chester, Pennsylvania; launched on 11 October 1941; sponsored by Miss Barbara Vickery of Washington, D.C.; acquired by the Navy on 20 July 1941; and commissioned as Neches on 16 September 1942.

== Service history ==
=== 1942–1945 ===
After shakedown off the Atlantic Coast she steamed for San Pedro, California via the Panama Canal. Her first wartime operations took her to Guadalcanal, where she fueled various fleet units. From 28 November she serviced ships out of Nouméa, New Caledonia. She shifted operations to Havannah Harbor, Efate Island, New Hebrides on 22 January 1943, and then steamed for San Pedro, California on 6 March, arriving there the 21st.

Four days later she was en route to Pearl Harbor to deliver fuel, arriving on 30 March. The next week she was back at San Pedro and, following a ten-day availability there she got underway with Pennsylvania (BB-38), Nassau (CVE-16), and six screening destroyers en route to Dutch Harbor, Alaska. Arriving on 1 May, she fueled thirteen ships before she steamed to the Puget Sound Navy Yard on 9 May for two days of repairs. She then returned to Dutch Harbor.

The oiler operated in Alaskan waters until late December, when she returned to San Pedro to take on fuel for delivery to Pearl Harbor. After a four-day call at Pearl Harbor she steamed to Majuro Atoll, Marshall Islands, where she provided fueling services for the next three months.

She was once again en route to San Pedro when, at 18:15 on 21 May 1944, she struck a mine off the California coast. The explosion tore a 22-foot (6.7 m) by 15-foot (4.6 m) hole in her port side, necessitating a week of drydock repairs at San Pedro. Final repairs were completed in two months, and she was back at Pearl Harbor on 27 July. At Pearl Harbor, Naval Historian Ed Anderson joined the crew, working as an accountant.

She then steamed in convoy to Eniwetok Atoll, where she anchored on 10 August and commenced fueling operations. Through October she provided fueling services in the area of the Admiralty Islands. The oiler anchored at Ulithi on 2 November and through that month provided services in the local at sea refueling areas. On 15 November 1944, she left Ulithi for Leyte Gulf, Luzon, and eventually, the South China Seas, passing between islands that were still held by the Japanese. When she returned in December, the crew learned of the fate of the USS Mississinewa (AO-59). When the Neches left Ulithi on 15 November, the Mississinewa docked in her berth, and was hit by a Japanese Kaiten torpedo.

By mid-January 1945 Neches was en route to again to Leyte Gulf and the South China Sea, where she fueled ships into February. She returned to Leyte on 18 March and fueled transports in preparation for the invasion of Okinawa. Anchoring off Kerama Retto on 6 April, she set Condition I at 15:45. When Japanese air raiders came in at 16:30 her gunners opened fire, and after ten hours of intermittent air attack Neches gunners splashed a kamikaze off the starboard quarter. By mid-April Neches was again fueling ships out of her Ulithi anchorage.

When fleet units first bombarded the Japanese home islands on 10 July, Neches was in waters off northern Japan. She steamed into Tokyo Bay on 29 August, becoming the first oiler on the scene. Assigned duties there as station tanker, she fueled 120 ships through September. Departing for San Pedro on 15 October, she arrived the 31st and underwent overhaul in the Naval Shipyard, Terminal Island, San Francisco, until the end of December.

=== 1946–1955 ===
Neches continued to operate with the Service Force, Pacific Fleet, for the next two years. She was placed under administrative control of the Naval Transport Service in July 1947 and was shifted to the Military Sea Transportation Service (MSTS) two years later. During the post-war period she served as a point-to-point tanker, calling at Hawaii, the Philippine Islands, Japan, Southeast Asia, Arabia, Alaska, and the Canal Zone.

She decommissioned on 10 July 1950 and was placed in the Pacific Reserve Fleet, San Diego Group. Recommissioned on 3 January 1951 at Oakland, California, she operated as an MSTS tanker and served with the 6th Fleet in the Mediterranean. She again returned to the Pacific Reserve Fleet for inactivation at Stockton, California, in June 1955.

=== 1961–1970 ===
After extensive alterations to electronic and dock equipment, including the addition of five rigs for underway replenishment, Neches recommissioned on 24 November 1961 at the Naval Supply Depot, Seattle. She then rejoined the Service Force, Pacific Fleet, and was homeported in San Francisco.

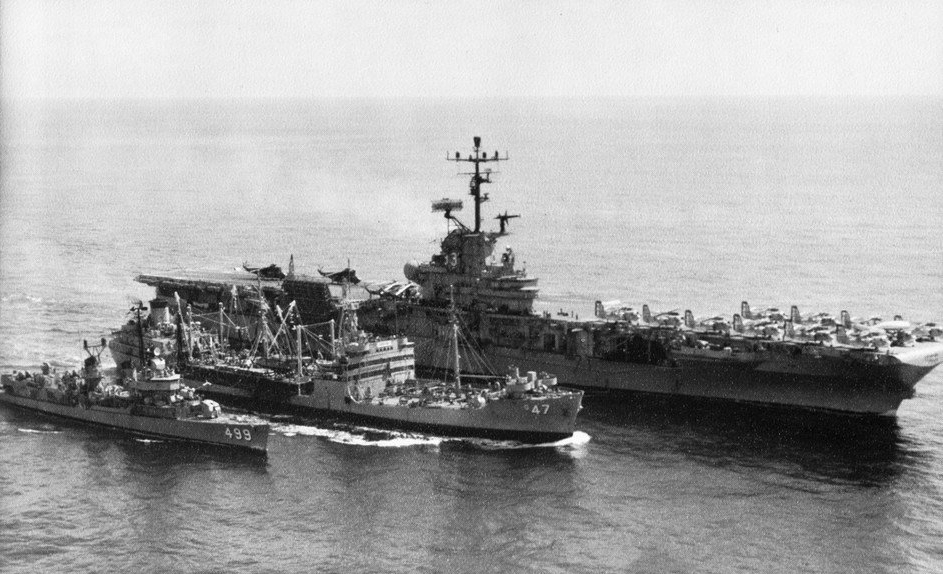
Neches refueling Kearsarge and Renshaw, 20 December 1966

The oiler commenced regular overhaul 6 May 1963, and through 1967 she deployed annually to WESTPAC and maintained herself in a state of readiness during training, upkeep, and leave periods in home waters. Her homeport remained at Hunters Point, San Francisco.

She steamed on 21 September 1967 for underway replenishment service in WESTPAC, operating on "Yankee Station" and servicing "Operation Market Time" craft in Southeast Asia. Her deployment lasted through 30 March 1968, when she tied up once again at San Francisco. Neches’ Yankee Station and Market Time operations had been punctuated by calls at Subic Bay, Sasebo, Kaohsiung, and Hong Kong.

Through September 1968 Neches operated off the West Coast, with a summer call at Portland, Oregon, for the Rose Festival. By the end of the first week of September she was underway for yet another seven-month deployment to WESTPAC.

Neches began her last deployment on 1 January 1970 from Hunter's Point Naval Shipyard. She arrived at Subic Bay later that month. From Subic Bay she left for the coast of Vietnam to support operations there. Off the coast of Vietnam she conducted a number of underway replenishments with ships of the U.S. and Australian navies, including the USS St. Paul (CA-73). One item of note occurred on 19 March 1970 during an underway replenishment with the USS Orleck (DD-886), in somewhat heavy seas. The replenishment began smoothly. Suddenly the Orleck closed with the Neches until the Orleck's bow struck the Neches aft of the Neches starboard midsection, and then continued to scrape along the side of the Neches further aft. Orleck dropped astern, leaving her port anchor on the tank deck of the Neches. There were no casualties on board the Neches. After repairs and an investigation at Subic Bay, Neches continued to fulfill her mission in support of 7th Fleet ships. She returned to Hunters Point in July 1970, and was moved up the San Francisco Bay to Vallejo, California for decommissioning soon after that. Her crew departed her for the last time at Vallejo on 1 October 1970.
