= USS Schuylkill =

Oiler of the United States Navy

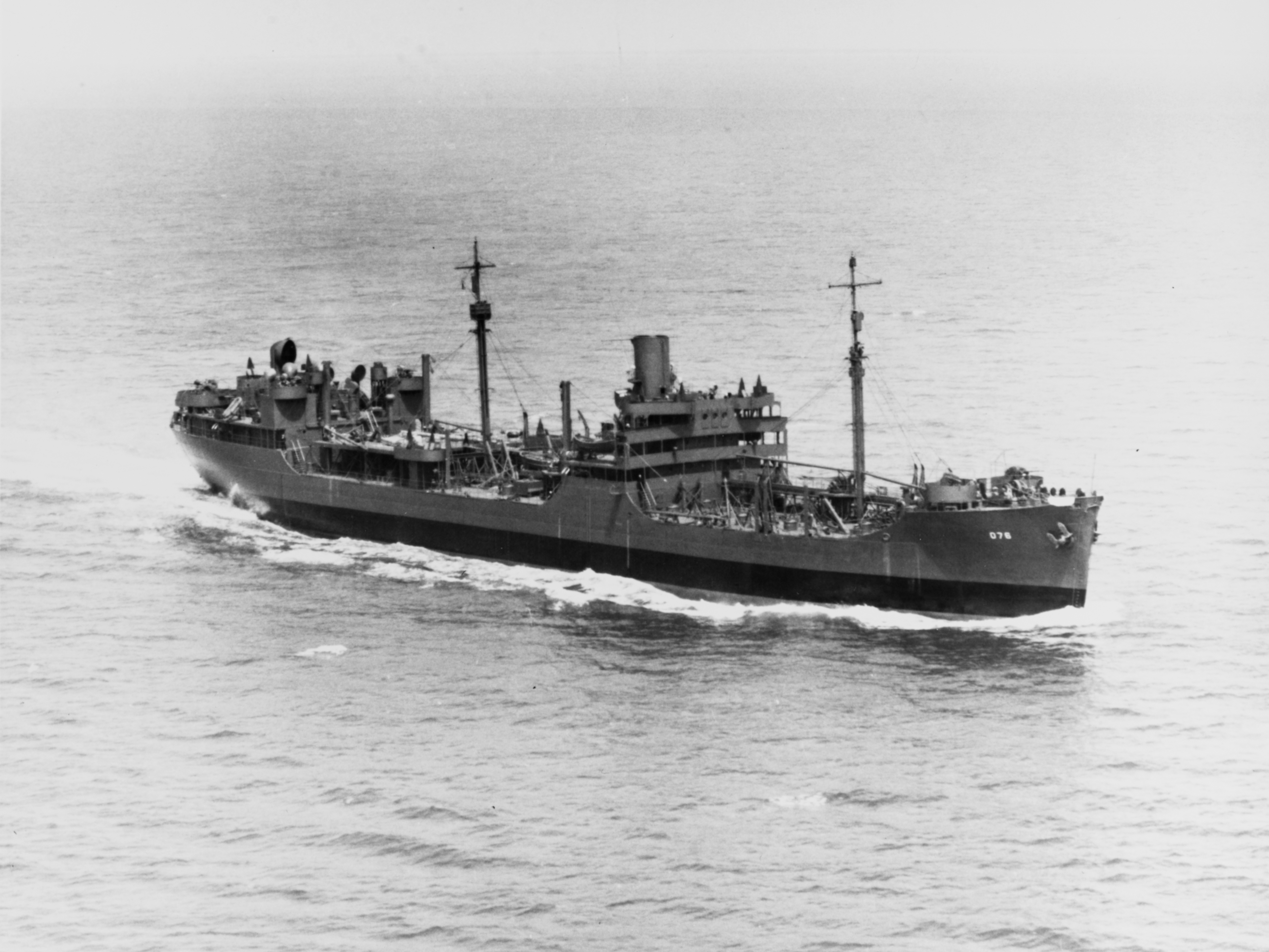
- USS Schuylkill (AO-76) underway at sea on 17 April 1943

History

United States
- Name: USS Schuylkill
- Namesake: Schuylkill River
- Builder: Sun Shipbuilding & Drydock Co., Chester, Pennsylvania
- Laid down: 24 September 1942
- Launched: 16 February 1943
- Acquired: 27 February 1943
- Commissioned: 9 April 1943
- Decommissioned: 14 February 1946
- Stricken: 31 March 1986
- Identification: IMO number: 7737444
- Honors and awards: 7 battle stars (World War II)
- Fate: Scrapped 8 October 1988

General characteristics
- Type: Suamico-class fleet replenishment oiler
- Displacement: 21,500 long tons (21,845 t) full
- Length: 523 ft 6 in (159.56 m)
- Beam: 68 ft (21 m)
- Draft: 30 ft 10 in (9.40 m)
- Propulsion: Turbo-electric, single screw, 8,000 hp (5,966 kW)
- Speed: 15 knots (28 km/h; 17 mph)
- Capacity: 140,000 barrels (22,000 m^{3})
- Complement: 253
- Armament: 1 × 5"/38 caliber gun; 4 × 3"/50 caliber guns; 4 × twin 40 mm AA guns; 4 × twin 20 mm AA guns

USS Schuylkill (AO-76), originally named the SS Louisburg, was a Type T2-SE-A1 Suamico-class fleet oiler of the United States Navy.

The ship was laid down under a Maritime Commission contract (MC hull 306) on 24 September 1943 by the Sun Shipbuilding & Drydock Co. of Chester, Pennsylvania and launched on 16 February 1943. Delivered on 27 February 1943, converted to Navy use, and commissioned at Baltimore, Maryland, on 9 April 1943.

== Service history ==
=== World War II, 1943–1945 ===
After shakedown operations off the east coast, Schuylkill departed Norfolk on 20 May 1943, picked up her first cargo of fuel at Baytown, Texas, and arrived at the Panama Canal on 1 June. Leaving Balboa on 4 June, Schuylkill sailed for Seattle, and thence proceeded to San Pedro, to load oil for the Aleutian Islands. Schuylkill got underway on 27 June and arrived via Unimak Pass at Dutch Harbor, Unalaska, on 5 July. She completed her first fueling at sea en route, when she replenished USCG Haida in the Gulf of Alaska.

Schuylkill departed Aleutian waters on 20 July and, from 1 to 10 September, fueled ships of a task group preparing to attack the Gilbert Islands. She operated in support of the Gilbert Islands campaign from 15 November until 14 December and of the Marshall Islands campaign from 4 to 25 February 1944. From 17 to 22 May, Schuylkill operated with a task group which made strikes on Marcus Island and Wake Island. Next, the oiler participated in the conquest of the Marianas, fueling ships fighting for that strategic island group from 15 to 27 June, from 2 to 25 July, and from 3 to 12 August, before turning to the western Carolines.

At 0434 on 10 September, while maneuvering in a hazy half-light, Schuylkill's bow struck her sister ship Millicoma (AO-73) on her quarter. Schuylkill received a large V-shaped hole on her starboard side. She immediately pumped about 25,000 US gallons (95,000 L) of fresh water from the fore peak tank and transferred cargo oil from forward to after tanks to raise her bow. Unable to proceed until her bulkheads were shored up, the oiler fueled five ships while stopped. After temporary repair, she was able to get underway at 4 knots; and, as the fueling of more vessels raised the hole further above her water line, she doubled her speed. In all, Schuylkill delivered 30,748 barrels (4,888.5 m^{3}) of fuel oil on that day, earning a "well done" from the task group commander. Schuylkill carried out her scheduled fuel replenishment duty until relief tankers arrived three days later. Then, her task done, she and Millicoma, with destroyer escorts, Waterman (DE-740) and Bangust (DE-739), steamed toward the Admiralties. She arrived at Manus on 15 September for repairs.

From 4 to 25 October and from 12 to 21 November, Schuylkill supported the 3rd Fleet during attacks on northern Luzon and Formosa. She operated in Lingayen Gulf during the Luzon landings from 28 December 1944 to 28 January 1945, and participated in the Iwo Jima campaign from 16 February to 3 March.

On 29 April, Schuylkill got underway from Ulithi toward the California coast. Steaming singly, she zigzagged her way across the Pacific and arrived at San Pedro on the morning of 17 May for an overhaul, repairs, and alterations. On 13 July, during post-repair sea trials, the replenisher oiler suffered an engine breakdown and was towed back to the harbor for repairs which were completed on 23 July.

Schuylkill departed San Pedro on 25 July, picked up cargo oil at Pearl Harbor on 1 August, got underway for the western Carolines on the 3d and arrived at Ulithi on the 15th. Five days later, Schuylkill got underway as part of a unit of the 3rd Fleet and entered Tokyo Bay on 10 September.

On the 16th, she got underway for the Marshalls, arriving at Eniwetok on 23 September. Schuylkill remained there, replenishing ships with fuel oil, diesel, and aviation gasoline until 1 November when she headed for the west coast. She arrived at San Francisco on 13 November.

=== 1946–1986 ===
Schuylkill was decommissioned on 14 February 1946 and turned over to the Maritime Commission on 27 April. Reacquired by the Navy on 30 January 1948 and assigned to the Military Sea Transport Service on 1 October 1949, the replenisher oiler served in waters ranging from the northern Pacific to the Persian Gulf, and from Baltimore to Bremerhaven. She saw active service in the western Pacific during the Korean War, making several voyages to Pusan. After hostilities ended, Schuylkill remained in the Pacific except for transiting the Panama Canal in June 1955 for service in the Gulf of Mexico until 22 October. She then departed for San Diego.

Schuylkill continued her service to the nation by her participation in the Arctic resupply operations in 1957. The replenisher oiler also served off Vietnam, and along both coasts of the United States. In 1974, Schuylkill was anchored at Savannah, Georgia, continuing her support of Naval forces worldwide.

Schuylkill was struck from the Naval Vessel Register on 31 March 1986, disposed of by Maritime Administration (MARAD) sale on 4 March 1988 and scrapped in Taiwan on 8 October 1988

== Awards ==
Schuylkill received seven battle stars for World War II service.
