= AO-44 =

AO-44 may refer to:

- APB, the silent variant of the Stechkin APS, had the factory name AO-44
- USS Patuxent (AO-44), a United States Navy refueling ship which saw service during World War I
