= USS Winooski (AO-38) =

Oiler of the United States Navy

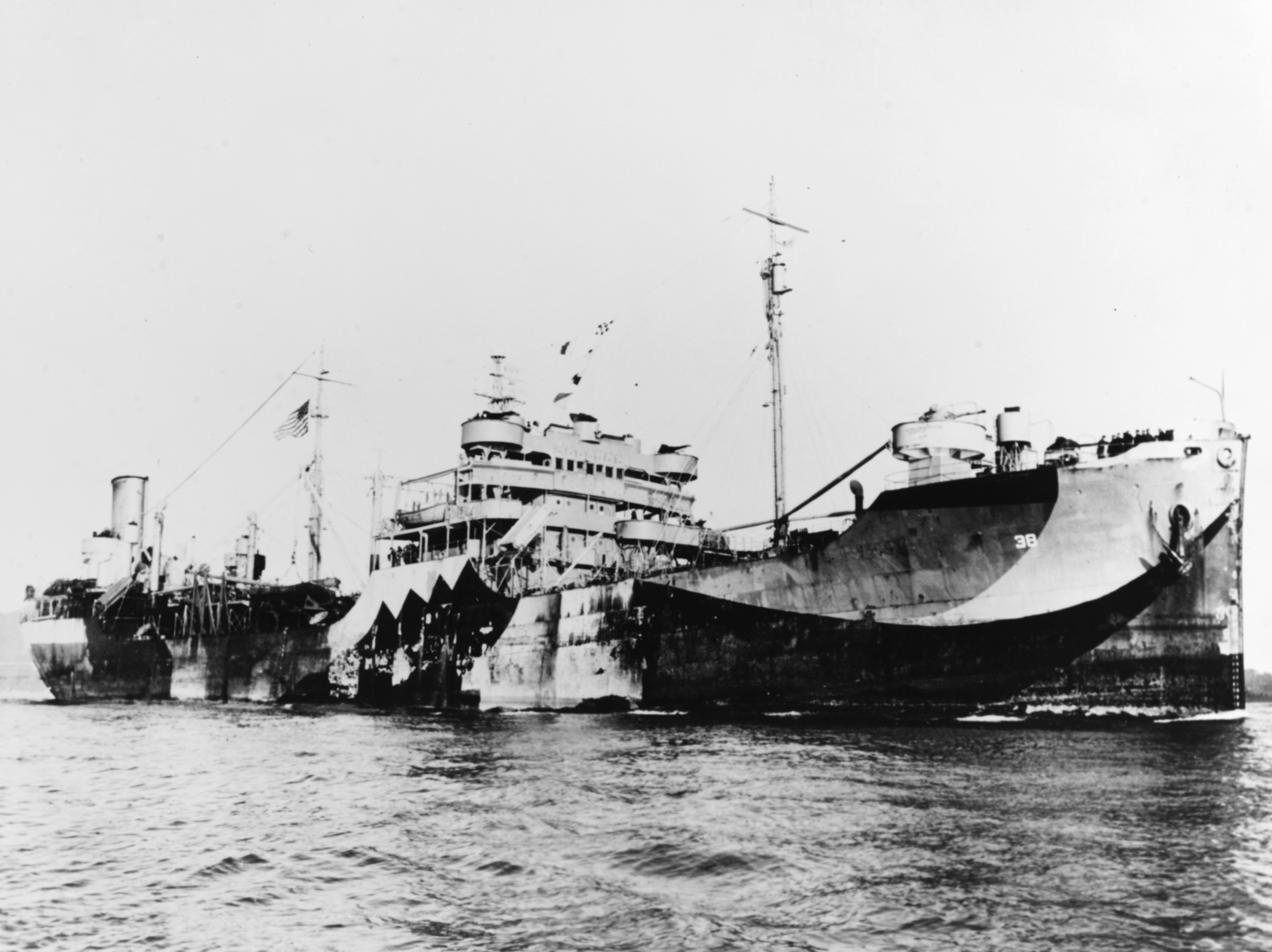

History

United States
- Name: USS Winooski
- Namesake: Winooski River in Vermont
- Laid down: 23 April 1941
- Launched: 12 November 1941
- Commissioned: 27 January 1942
- Decommissioned: 30 April 1946
- Stricken: 8 October 1946
- Honors and awards: 4 battle stars (World War II)
- Fate: Sold for scrap, 1965

General characteristics
- Class & type: Kennebec class oiler
- Type: MARAD T2
- Tonnage: 15,910 DWT
- Displacement: 21,077 tons
- Length: 501 ft 8 in (152.91 m)
- Beam: 68 ft (21 m)
- Draft: 29 ft 8.5 in (9.055 m)
- Depth: 37 ft (11 m)
- Installed power: 12,000 shp (8,900 kW)
- Propulsion: geared steam turbine; single screw
- Speed: 16.5 knots (30.6 km/h)
- Range: 8,000 nmi (15,000 km; 9,200 mi)
- Capacity: 130,000 bbl (~18,000 t)
- Complement: 214–247
- Armament: 1 × 5"/38 caliber gun mounts; 4 × 3"/50 caliber gun mounts; 8 × 40 mm AA gun mounts; 8 × 20 mm AA gun mounts; 2 × depth charge projectors

The second USS Winooski (AO-38) was a Kennebec-class oiler in the United States Navy.

Winooski was laid down as Calusa on 23 April 1941 at Sparrows Point, Maryland, by the Bethlehem Steel Company under a Maritime Commission contract (MC hull 144); launched on 12 November 1941; sponsored by Mrs. Laurence B. Levi; taken over by the Navy on 5 January 1942. She was renamed Winooski (AO-38) on 9 January 1942; and commissioned at Baltimore, Maryland, on 27 January 1942.

== Service history ==
=== 1942 ===
Following a brief period of shakedown training in the Chesapeake Bay, Winooski embarked upon her first mission in mid-February. She arrived in Baytown, Texas, on 25 February and began loading a cargo of fuel. The oiler departed Baytown on 2 March and arrived in Norfolk, Virginia on the 7th. The next day, Winooski got underway for Newport, Rhode Island, where she remained until the 25th. On that day, the ship got underway in company with USS Delta (AK-29) and USS Lea (DD-118), bound for Iceland. She and her consorts arrived in Reykjavík on 1 April and remained there until the 4th, at which time she returned to sea. The oiler arrived back at Norfolk on 13 April. Four days later, she stood out to sea en route to Baton Rouge, Louisiana. She loaded fuel at Baton Rouge from 23 to 25 April and then set a course back to Norfolk in which port she arrived on the 29th. She discharged her cargo at Craney Island and, on 4 May, embarked upon another voyage to Baytown. The oiler loaded fuel at Baytown from 9 to 11 May and stood out to sea on the return voyage. She reentered Norfolk on the 16th. Four days later, the ship steamed out of Chesapeake Bay again, on her way to NS Argentia, Newfoundland. She arrived at her destination on the 23rd and began almost a month of harbor fuelling duty there. On 15 June, Winooski cleared Argentia for Norfolk where she arrived on 29 June. After a nine-day availability at the Norfolk Navy Yard, the oiler resumed duty, starting out on a voyage to Deer Park, Texas, on 8 July. She returned to Norfolk from Deer Park on 21 July but, two days later, headed back to Argentia where she resumed duty as station oiler from 26 July to 13 August. She returned to Norfolk on 16 August and remained there until 2 September at which time she got underway for Iceland once again. She stopped at Reykjavík for one week, from 10 to 17 September, and reentered Norfolk on the 25th.

Following a yard availability, Winooski began preparations for the amphibious assault on the Moroccan coast. In addition to her cargo of fuel oil, the ship deck-loaded two high-speed fire support boats for use in the invasion. On 24 October, she rendezvoused with the other ships of Task Force (TF) 34 and set a course for North Africa. The fleet arrived off Fedhala early in the morning of 8 November. Winooski launched the fire support boats and, while they moved in to assist the troops assaulting the beaches, she proceeded to fuel the ships in the anchorage. She continued fueling operations unmolested until 11 November when the enemy launched a series of submarine counterattacks against the invasion fleet. At about 2000 hours that evening, a torpedo from German submarine U-173 struck the oiler just abaft of the bridge, punching a hole in her number 6 tank and damaging several other compartments as well. Winooski listed about eight degrees, but she corrected it almost immediately by shifting cargo and resumed her duties the following day. Further submarine attacks occurred on the 12th, but Winooski emerged unscathed and quickly put farther out to sea where she and the other ships maneuvered evasively to avoid submarine attacks. On 15 November, she put into port at Casablanca and resumed fueling operations. She remained in that port until 23 November at which time she got underway for Gibraltar for a three-month repair period.

=== 1943 ===
On 27 February 1943, Winooski joined a convoy headed for the United States, GUS-5. After a transatlantic voyage without incident, the oiler arrived back in Norfolk on 11 March. On the 21st, the ship stood out of Chesapeake Bay on her way to Beaumont, Texas. She arrived in Beaumont on 26 March and began loading cargo. Winooski returned to Norfolk on 2 April and remained there for five days. On the 8th, she got underway again, bound for Aruba in the Netherlands West Indies. At Aruba on the 13th, the oiler loaded cargo again and headed back to Norfolk, where she arrived on the 18th. After a brief yard period, during which four PT boats were deck-loaded on board her, Winooski departed Norfolk on 25 April for New York, there to join a convoy bound for the Mediterranean Sea. The convoy put to sea on 28 April. Winooski arrived in Casablanca on 16 May, loaded additional fuel oil – she had refueled escorts on the transatlantic run – and departed Casablanca on the 18th. The following day, she entered port at Oran, Algeria. That evening, her anchorage came under enemy air attack. The oiler brought every gun on board – including the light ma-chineguns on the deck-loaded PT's – to bear on the attackers but failed to score a kill. The enemy, however, did little better, for the harbor suffered very little damage. The oiler remained in North Africa until 22 July, providing distant support for the invasion and occupation of Sicily. She unloaded the PT boats on 22 May; and, on 1 June, she shifted to Mers El Kébir. On 21 July, the oiler moved back to Oran where she remained overnight before getting underway for Gibraltar. There, the ship joined up with a convoy and set a course for the United States. She arrived in Hampton Roads on 3 August.

On 12 August, she embarked upon another voyage to Beaumont, Texas, arriving there on the 18th. She loaded cargo and then got underway again on the 20th. The oiler arrived back at Norfolk on 25 August and began preparations for another transatlantic voyage. On 1 September, the ship headed for New York where she arrived on the following day. On 5 September, Winooski put to sea with a convoy bound for the British Isles. She provided refueling services to the convoy's escorts along the way and arrived in Belfast Lough, Ireland, on 14 September. After further refueling operations, she moved to Loch Long, Scotland, where she discharged the remainder of her oil to the dock. After a visit to Gourock, Scotland, the oiler departed the United Kingdom, bound for home. She reentered Norfolk on 1 October and remained there one week before embarking upon another voyage to Aruba. She reached the Dutch colony on 13 October, loaded oil, and headed back to Norfolk on the 14th. She returned to Hampton Roads on the 20th, discharged her cargo at the Standard Oil dock, and entered the Norfolk Navy Yard for a 20-day availability. She exited the yard on 11 November and anchored in Hampton Roads. Between 13 and 26 November, Winooski made another round-trip voyage from Norfolk to Texas and back. On 5 December, she rendezvoused with another transatlantic convoy, this time off Cape Henry, Virginia, and set a course for North Africa. She arrived in Casablanca on 20 December and remained there until the 28th, at which time she joined the homeward-bounty Convoy GUS-25.

=== 1944 ===
The oiler reentered Chesapeake Bay on 17 January 1944 and moored at Norfolk. On 4 February, Winooski departed Norfolk with a load of oil bound for Bermuda. She arrived at her destination on 6 February, discharged her cargo and, on 14 February, set a course for Baytown, Texas. She loaded cargo at Baytown between the 20th and the 24th and then shaped a course back to Norfolk, where she arrived on 1 March. From 5 to 19 March, the oiler made another Texas run, this time to Port Arthur and back to Norfolk. Six days after her return, she was on her way back to Texas. On the return voyage, however, the ship was diverted to Casco Bay, Maine, where she discharged her cargo. The ship entered New York on 9 April and remained there until the 12th at which time she headed back to Texas for another load of oil. Winooski reentered New York harbor on the 27th and began preparations for another transatlantic voyage. The convoy stood out of New York on 3 May, and Winooski arrived in Avonmouth, England, on the 16th. From there, she moved to Belfast whence she departed on the 19th to return to the United States. The oiler arrived back in New York on 28 May and remained there until 8 June when she stood out to sea with another convoy, bound for Europe. She arrived in Swansea, Wales, on the 19th. She discharged cargo there and returned to sea on the 22nd. After a brief stop at Belfast Lough, Winooski departed for home on 24 June and reentered Norfolk on Independence Day 1944.

She remained in the Norfolk area until 14 July when she returned to sea with a convoy bound for the Mediterranean, a part of the force being sent to invade southern France. Winooski reached the Strait of Gibraltar on 28 July and put into Mers El Kébir on the 30th. On 3 August, she set sail for Palermo, Sicily, and arrived there two days later. The oiler remained at Palermo providing logistics support for the bombardment and fire support units of the invasion fleet until 28 August. On that day she departed Palermo and, after visits to Bizerte and Oran, got underway to return home on 4 September. She entered New York harbor 10 days later. The ship stayed in the New York area until 18 September when she headed back to Norfolk. The ship arrived at her destination on the 19th and entered the navy yard for alterations. She completed modifications on 8 October and, after a series of trials, departed Norfolk on the 14th. The oiler made a stop at Aruba to load oil and aviation gasoline and then set a course for the Panama Canal. She arrived at Cristobal, Canal Zone, on 22 October and transited the canal that same day.

On 23 October, Winooski – by then a unit of the Pacific Fleet – embarked upon a long voyage to the Admiralty Islands. She arrived in Seeadler Harbor at Manus on 16 November and remained there for more than a month fueling American warships and conducting underway training. On 23 December, she departed Manus with Task Group (TG) 77.6 and arrived in Leyte Gulf on the 30th. She remained at Leyte until 2 January 1945 at which time she put to sea with TG 77.10, bound for Mindoro where she and the other units of Task Unit (TU) 77.10.5 were to establish a forward logistics base for the forces engaged in the assault and occupation of Luzon. The unit with which Winooski steamed came under air attack several times; and, though the oiler herself escaped unscathed, one ship – USS Ommaney Bay (CVE-79) – fell victim to the kamikaze attacks and suffered such severe damage that American ships had to sink her with torpedoes.

=== 1945 ===
Winooski arrived safely in Mangarin Bay, Mindoro, on 4 January; and, though she and her consorts had to put to sea each night because of the danger of air attacks, they remained in that vicinity until 8 January and provided fuel for the warships engaged in the Lingayen Gulf operation. On the 8th, she left Mindoro to rendezvous with TG 77.9, the Luzon Reinforcement Group, and set a course with that task group for Lingayen Gulf. The ships arrived in Lingayen Gulf on the morning of 11 January, but Winooski departed the gulf again that evening to join TG 77.4, the Escort Carrier Group, for several days of refueling operations before returning to the gulf on the 15th. She resumed anchorage fueling duty at Lingayen for the remainder of the month.

On 10 February, Winooski moved from Lingayen Gulf to recently captured Subic Bay. She resumed fueling operations at that location and remained there until near the end of the first week in April. She departed Subic Bay on 5 April and headed back to Leyte, arriving in San Pedro Bay on the 8th. There, the oiler loaded provisions, stores, and a cargo of fuel oil before getting underway for Zamboanga where she arrived on the 16th. Two days later, she departed Zamboanga in company with TU 78.2.15 for the landing at Pollac harbor on southern Mindanao. The ship arrived in the landing area on the 19th and conducted fueling operations until 29 April when she set sail for Tawi Tawi in the Sulu Archipelago. She arrived at her destination on the 30th and remained there awaiting the successful conclusion of Allied landings at Tarakan, Borneo. On 1 May, she received word that the landings at Tarakan were proceeding smoothly and got underway for Borneo. The oiler arrived at Tarakan on 2 May and remained there conducting fueling operations until the 7th at which time she headed back to the Philippines. Steaming via Tawi Tawi, Winooski arrived back in San Pedro Bay on the 10th and remained there until the 14th when she got underway to return to Tarakan. She resumed harbor fueling duty at Tarakan from 16 May to 1 June. From there, she moved back to Tawi Tawi where she conducted fueling operations for a day or two before sailing on to Zamboanga.

Winooski stayed at Zamboanga, making preparations for the landings at Brunei Bay, Borneo, from 5 to 7 June. On the latter day, she departed Zamboanga and joined TG 78.1. The task group arrived at Brunei Bay on the morning of 10 June. The landings went off smoothly, and the oiler began her usual routine of refueling the ships of the invasion fleet. She carried out those operations until 14 June at which time she headed back to Leyte. She replenished at Leyte on 17 and 18 June and returned to Brunei Bay on the 21st. She remained there until the 29th at which time she headed, via Zamboanga, back to Leyte. Winooski replenished at San Pedro Bay from 8 to 12 July and steamed via Guiuan, Samar, back to Brunei Bay. The ship served as station oiler at Brunei Bay from 16 to 19 July and returned to Leyte on the 24th.

For the remaining three weeks of the war and through the first four months of the postwar period, Winooski steamed the length and breadth of the Philippine Archipelago delivering fuel to American ships throughout the area. On 17 December, USS Monongahela (AO-42) relieved her of duty as station oiler at Manila. Three days later, Winooski began the long voyage home. En route, however, she received a change in orders; and, after a brief stop in Pearl Harbor to disembark passengers and load cargo, she reversed course for Japan on 5 January 1946.

=== 1946 ===
The oiler arrived at Yokosuka, Japan, on 17 January, discharged her cargo to ships at the naval base, and got underway for home again on the 24th. She arrived in San Francisco, California, on 8 February but remained only nine days. She set sail for Norfolk, Virginia, on the 17th. The ship transited the Panama Canal on the 26th and arrived in Norfolk early in March.

After almost two months of preparations, Winooski was placed out of commission at Norfolk on 30 April 1946. She was delivered to the War Shipping Administration for disposal on 1 August 1946, and her name was stricken from the Navy list on 8 October 1946.

Winooski earned four battle stars during World War II.

She was later returned to civilian service as Calusa (1946), Samuel L. Fuller (1947), Seanymph (1963), and Meracoulosa (1965).
