= Kennebec-class oiler =

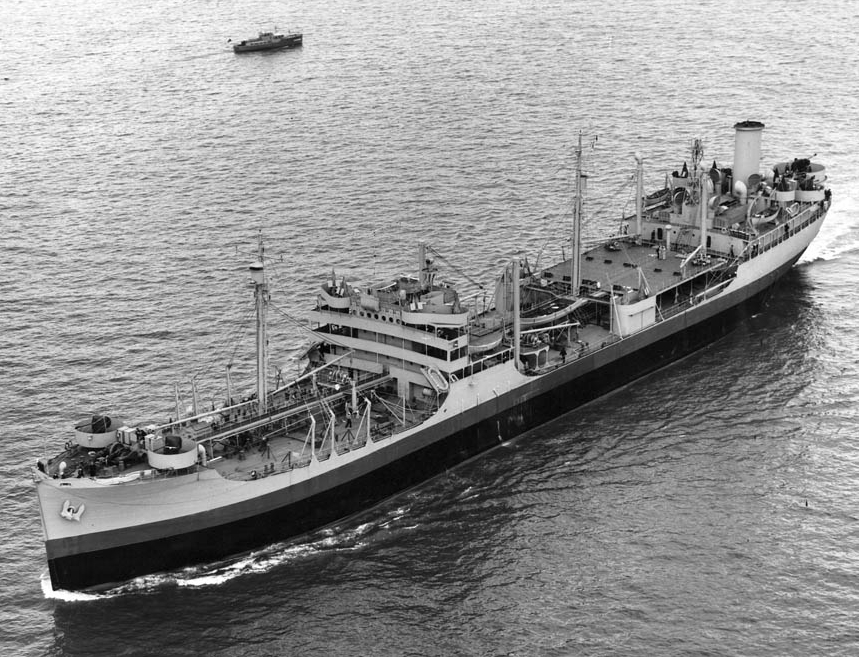
- Niobrara underway in March 1943

Class overview
- Name: Kennebec
- Builders: Bethlehem Sparrows Point Shipyard; Sparrows Point, Maryland; Sun Shipbuilding & Drydock Co.; Chester, Pennsylvania
- Preceded by: Chicopee class
- Succeeded by: Suamico class
- In commission: 1942–1970
- Completed: 16
- Active: 1 in commercial service as lake freighter
- Lost: 1
- Retired: 14

General characteristics
- Type: MARAD T2
- Tonnage: 15,910 DWT
- Displacement: 21,077 tons
- Length: 501 ft 8 in (152.9 m)
- Beam: 68 ft (20.7 m)
- Draft: 29 ft 8.5 in (9.1 m)
- Depth: 37 ft (11.3 m)
- Installed power: 12,000 shp (8,900 kW)
- Propulsion: geared steam turbine; single screw
- Speed: 16.5 knots (30.6 km/h; 19.0 mph)
- Range: 8,000 nmi (15,000 km; 9,200 mi)
- Capacity: 130,000 bbl (~18,000 t)
- Complement: 214–247
- Armament: 1 × 5"/38 caliber gun mounts; 4 × 3"/50 caliber gun mounts; 8 × 40 mm AA gun mounts; 8 × 20 mm AA gun mounts; 2 × depth charge projectors

General characteristics
- Class & type: Mattaponi-class oiler
- Type: MARAD T2-A
- Tonnage: 16,400 DWT
- Displacement: 21,750 tons
- Length: 520 ft (160 m)
- Beam: 68 ft (21 m)
- Draft: 29 ft 11.5 in (9.131 m)
- Depth: 37 ft (11 m)
- Installed power: 12,000 shp (8,900 kW)
- Propulsion: geared steam turbine; single screw
- Speed: 16.5 knots (30.6 km/h; 19.0 mph)
- Range: 7,200 nmi (13,300 km; 8,300 mi)
- Capacity: 133,000 bbl (~18,100 t)

General characteristics
- Class & type: Chiwawa-class oiler
- Type: MARAD T3-S-A1
- Tonnage: 16,543 DWT
- Displacement: 21,077 tons
- Length: 501 ft 7.75 in (152.9017 m)
- Beam: 68 ft (21 m)
- Draft: 29 ft 10.5 in (9.106 m)
- Depth: 37 ft (11 m)
- Installed power: 7,000 shp (5,200 kW)
- Propulsion: geared steam turbine; single screw
- Speed: 15.3 knots (28.3 km/h; 17.6 mph)
- Range: 14,500 nmi (26,900 km; 16,700 mi)
- Capacity: 133,800 bbl (~18,250 t)

The Kennebec-class oilers were 16 United States Navy medium oilers (replenishment tankers) built during World War II to three related designs at Bethlehem Sparrows Point Shipyard of Sparrows Point, Maryland, and Sun Shipbuilding & Drydock Co. of Chester, Pennsylvania, all of which survived the war. One is still in commercial service as of 2026.

All of the ships of the class initially were to be built for private companies, but at the outset of World War II, the ships were transferred to the United States Maritime Commission and given new names. Later, when allocated to the U.S. Navy, they were renamed again.

In some cases, the Kennebec class is divided into three subclasses, the Kennebec (AO-36 to AO-40, AO-48), the Mattaponi (AO-41 to AO-44, AO-47) and the Chiwawa (AO-68 to 72). The first two subclasses were of the T2 and T2-A designs, built by different shipbuilders, and the Chiwawas were of the T3-S-A1 design, mainly differing in having only a 7,000 shp (5,200 kW) engine and a top speed of 15.3 knots (28.3 km/h; 17.6 mph).

== History ==
One of the first acts of the War Shipping Administration (WSA), established in February 1942, was to address the Navy's pressing need for oilers by requisitioning five tankers in service or under construction for civilian companies. Three of these were 16.5-knot (30.6 km/h; 19.0 mph) Type T2 "national defense tankers" designed by the Maritime Commission with potential militarization in mind and built by Bethlehem Steel for Socony-Vacuum Oil Co: Corsicana, Caddo, and Calusa. A month later, the WSA requisitioned six more: Socony's Colina and Conastoga, together with four similar ships building at Sun Shipbuilding and Drydock for Keystone Tankships to an enlarged design, later called T2-A: Kalkay, Ellkay, Jorkay and Emkay. Corsicana was commissioned as USS Kennebec, becoming the lead ship of the class; Kalkay was renamed Mattaponi and gave that name to the T2-A subclass. In June, the WSA moved to acquire the remaining member of each group, Aekay and Catawba.

The T2 design had itself been based on two ships built by Bethlehem Steel in 1938–39, Mobilfuel and Mobilube; the T2's principal difference was MarCom's inclusion of more powerful engines to produce the Navy's desired 16.5 knots. In the meantime, MarCom, under a state of emergency, had ordered 13 duplicates of Mobilfuel for the merchant marine; the first few of these were nearing completion in late 1942 when the Navy, still very short of oilers, requisitioned the first five starting with Samoset (ex-Mobiloil), renamed USS Chiwawa. Other than being limited to 15 knots, the Chiwawas were effectively identical to the Kennebec class, despite being assigned the confusing design code T3-S-A1.

All 16 ships survived the war, but were decommissioned shortly afterwards in favor of the larger, faster Cimarron class. Kennebec, Merrimack, Kankakee, Mattaponi, Monongahela, Tappahannock, and Neches were recommissioned for the U.S. Navy after World War II. Mattaponi and Tappahanock were reactivated four times, serving until 1970.

Chiwawa (now Lee A. Tregurtha) is still in commercial service on the Great Lakes. Neshanic (now American Victory) was sold for scrap and towed away to Turkey in 2018.

== Ships of the class ==
Construction data
Name	Hull no.	Original name	Commissioned	Final decommission	Fate
Kennebec	AO-36	Corsicana	4 Feb 1942	1 Apr 1970	scrapped, 1982
Merrimack	AO-37	Caddo	4 Feb 1942	29 Nov 1957	scrapped, 1982
Winooski	AO-38	Calusa	27 Jan 1942	30 Apr 1946	sold commercial 1947, scrapped 1965
Kankakee	AO-39	Colina	4 May 1942	27 Jun 1968	scrapped, 1976
Lackawanna	AO-40	Conastoga	10 Ju 1942	14 Feb 1946	sold commercial 1947, scrapped 1967
Neosho	AO-48	Catawba	16 Sep 1942	13 Dec 1945	sold commercial 1947, scrapped 1964

Construction data for Mattaponi subclass
Name	Hull no.	Original name	Commissioned	Final decommission	Fate
Mattaponi	AO-41	Kalkay	10 May 1942	30 Sep 1970	scrapped, 1973
Monongahela	AO-42	Ellkay	11 Sep 1942	22 Aug 1957	scrapped, 1982
Tappahannock	AO-43	Jorkay	22 Jun 1942	6 Mar 1970	scrapped, 1987
Patuxent	AO-44	Emmkay	22 Oct 1942	21 Feb 1946	sold commercial 1947, scrapped 1985
Neches	AO-47	Aekay	16 Sep 1942	1 Oct 1970	scrapped, 1973

Construction data for Chiwawa subclass
Name	Hull no.	Original name	Commissioned	Final decommission	Fate
Chiwawa	AO-68	Samoset, ex-Mobiloil	24 Dec 1942	6 May 1946	converted to Great Lakes ore carrier, 1961; still in service
Enoree	AO-69	Sachem	23 Jan 1943	22 Oct 1957	scrapped, 1982
Escalante	AO-70	Shabonee	30 Jan 1943	12 Dec 1945	sold commercial 1947, sunk 1960
Neshanic	AO-71	Marquette	13 Mar 1943	19 Dec 1945	converted to laker; sold for scrap 2018
Niobrara	AO-72	Citadel	20 Feb 1943	12 Nov 1957	scrapped 1982
