= USS Monongahela (AO-42) =

Kennebec-class oiler of the United States Navy

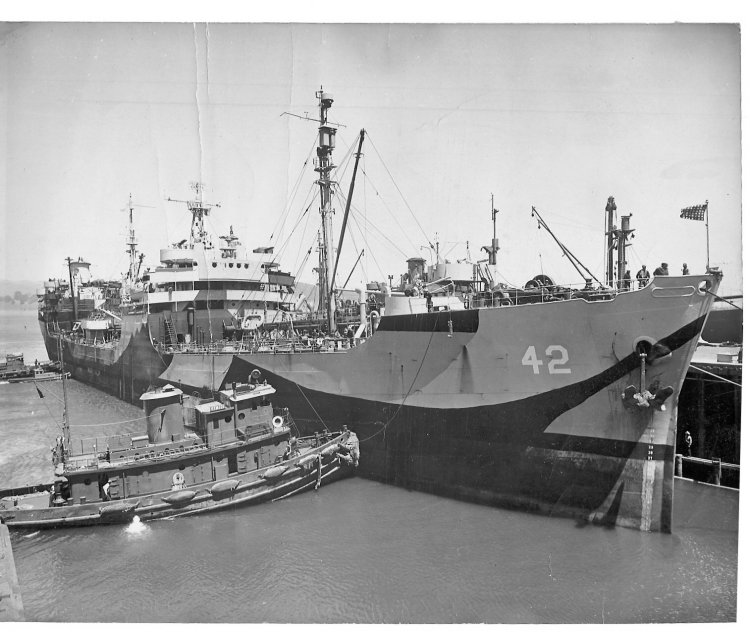

History

United States
- Name: USS Monongahela
- Namesake: Monongahela River
- Builder: Sun Shipbuilding & Drydock Co., Chester, Pennsylvania
- Launched: 1942
- Acquired: 1942-07-31
- Commissioned: 1942-09-11
- Decommissioned: 1950-06-09
- Recommissioned: 1951-01-09
- Decommissioned: 1955-06-10
- Recommissioned: 1956-12-28
- Decommissioned: 1957-08-22
- Stricken: 1959-02-01
- Honors and awards: 10 battle stars (World War II); 2 battle stars (Korea)
- Fate: Sold for scrapping, 1982-03-25

General characteristics
- Class & type: Mattaponi class oiler
- Type: MARAD T2-A
- Tonnage: 16,400 DWT
- Displacement: 21,750 tons
- Length: 520 ft (160 m)
- Beam: 68 ft (21 m)
- Draft: 29 ft 11.5 in (9.131 m)
- Depth: 37 ft (11 m)
- Installed power: 12,000 shp (8,900 kW)
- Propulsion: geared steam turbine; single screw
- Speed: 16.5 knots (30.6 km/h)
- Range: 7,200 nmi (13,300 km; 8,300 mi)
- Capacity: 133,000 bbl (~18,100 t)
- Complement: 249
- Armament: 1 × single 4"/50 caliber gun; 4 × single 3"/50 caliber dual purpose guns; 12 × 20 mm AA guns

The second USS Monongahela (AO-42) was a Kennebec-class oiler (Mattaponi subclass) in the United States Navy which saw service during World War II and the Korean War. She was the second U.S. Navy ship named for the Monongahela River in West Virginia and Pennsylvania.

The ship was built in 1942 as the commercial oil tanker ElKay, a type T2-A tanker, by the Sun Shipbuilding & Drydock Co. in Chester, Pennsylvania as hull number 227 and USMC number 158. Acquired by the United States Navy from the Maritime Commission on 31 July 1942, she was commissioned at Norfolk, Virginia, on 11 September 1942.

== Service history ==
=== 1942–1950 ===
Assigned to the Pacific Fleet, Monongahela departed Norfolk in November 1942 for Aruba, Netherlands West Indies, where she loaded oil and then steamed to Nouméa, New Caledonia, via the Panama Canal to supply American forces engaged in the struggle for Guadalcanal. For the next year, the tanker shuttled fuel oil, aviation gasoline, diesel oil, various dry cargoes, and ammunition between San Pedro, California, and Allied supply bases in the Solomons, New Caledonia, and New Zealand as part of the long seaborne pipeline supplying fuel for victory in the South Pacific. In January 1944, following a stateside overhaul and a Pearl Harbor fuel run, the big auxiliary joined the 5th Fleet support group for the invasion of the Marshall Islands, supplying various ships and small bases at Kwajalein, Eniwetok, and Majuro as those atolls were captured during the campaign.

In March 1944, Monongahela joined the At-Sea-Replenishment Group for Fast Carrier Task Force 58, for the remainder of the war operating continuously with the fast carriers, participating in every major central Pacific operation from the Hollandia, New Guinea, invasion in April 1944 to the invasion of Okinawa a year later. The oiler supported the flattops during the second strikes on Truk, the invasion of the Marianas, the Battle of the Philippine Sea, the Palaus invasion, the Leyte campaign, and the liberation of the Philippines. In November 1944, she was one of those oilers in Capt. Jasper T. Acuff's At-Sea-Refueling Group that made the perilous run through Surigao Strait into the East China Sea to refuel Admiral William F. Halsey's 3rd Fleet/TF 38 during its raids on the Indochinese and China coasts. The ship also supported the invasions of Iwo Jima and Okinawa, narrowly escaping damage from suicide air attacks at Kerama Retto, on 16 April 1945. At the end of the Okinawa operation in June, Monongahela steamed to San Francisco for a much needed overhaul which was still in progress when hostilities ceased on 15 August.

Following the war, the auxiliary remained active in the Pacific, participating in the occupation of Japan and operations in China in 1945–46 and then giving support to Pacific Fleet ships and stations for five years, decommissioning at San Diego on 9 June 1950.

=== 1951–1959 ===
The veteran tanker recommissioned on 9 January 1951 for the Korean War. Assigned to the Military Sea Transportation Service, Monongahela remained active in the Pacific, supplying U.N. forces in the Far East, until transferred to the Atlantic Fleet in March 1953, joining the 6th Fleet in the Mediterranean for extended operations 13 months later. On 9 June 1955, the ship arrived at Philadelphia where she decommissioned the next day and was placed in reserve.

The ship once again recommissioned as part of MSTS on 28 December 1956, operating along the Atlantic coast for eight months and then decommissioning on 22 August 1957 to enter the Maritime Administration's Reserve Fleet, at Beaumont, Texas. She was stricken from the Navy List on 1 February 1959, and sold for scrapping on 25 March 1982 to Eckhard and Co., Brownsville, Texas.

== Awards ==
Monongahela received ten battle stars for World War II service, and two battle stars for Korean War service.
