= USS Patuxent (AO-44) =

Oiler of the United States Navy

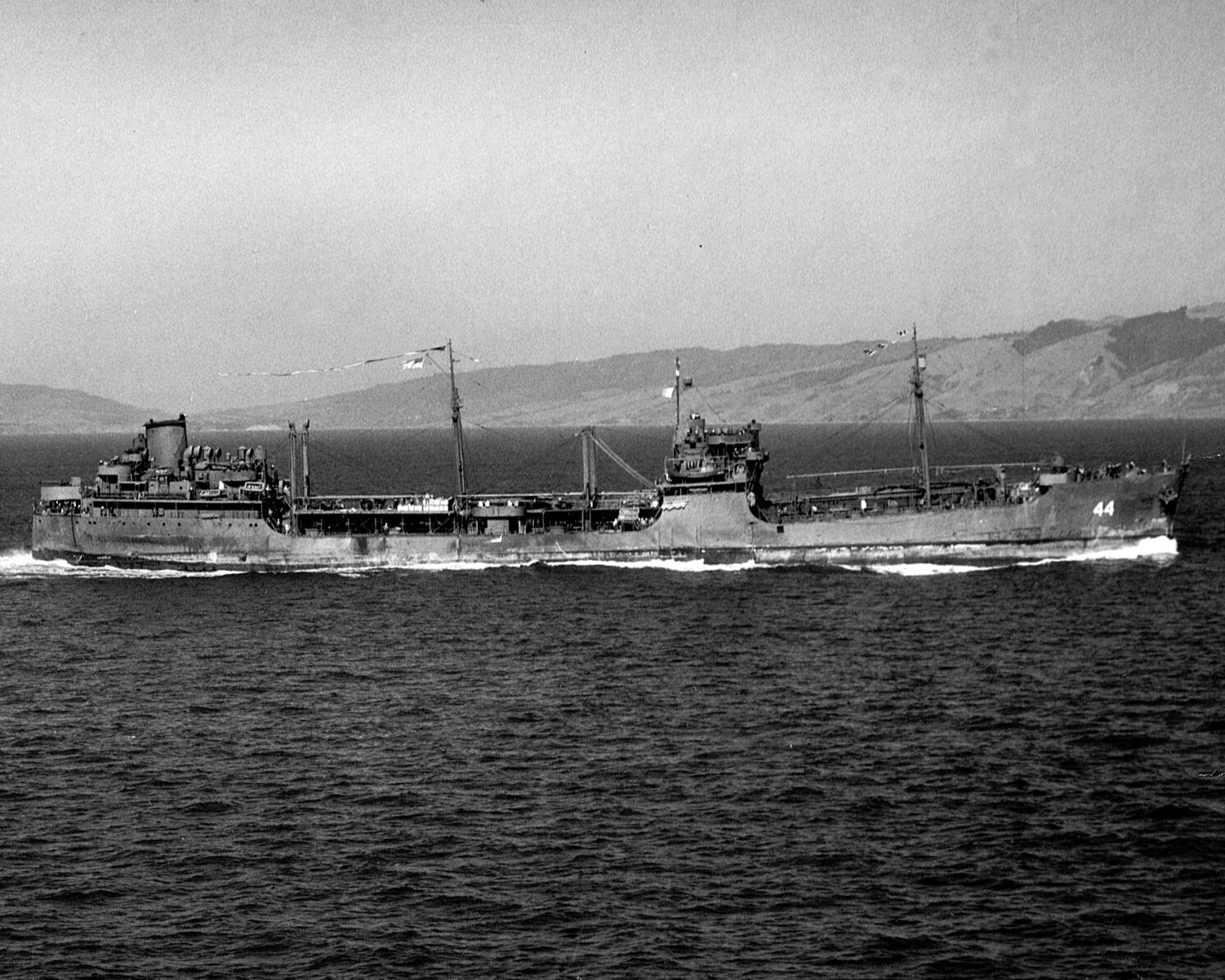
- USS Patuxent (AO-44) underway in October 1945

History

United States
- Name: USS Patuxent
- Namesake: Patuxent River
- Builder: Sun Shipbuilding & Drydock Co., Chester, Pennsylvania
- Laid down: 5 March 1942
- Launched: 25 July 1942
- Sponsored by: Mrs. W. H. Blanchard
- Acquired: 28 September 1942
- Commissioned: 22 October 1942
- Decommissioned: 21 February 1946
- Stricken: 12 March 1946
- Identification: IMO number: 5086877
- Honors and awards: 8 battle stars (World War II)
- Fate: Sold into commercial service, 1947

General characteristics
- Class & type: Mattaponi-class oiler
- Type: MARAD T2-A
- Tonnage: 16,400 DWT
- Displacement: 21,750 tons
- Length: 520 ft (160 m)
- Beam: 68 ft (21 m)
- Draft: 29 ft 11.5 in (9.131 m)
- Depth: 37 ft (11 m)
- Installed power: 12,000 shp (8,900 kW)
- Propulsion: geared steam turbine; single screw
- Speed: 16.5 knots (30.6 km/h)
- Range: 7,200 nmi (13,300 km; 8,300 mi)
- Capacity: 133,000 bbl (~18,100 t)
- Complement: 352
- Armament: 1 × single 4"/50 caliber gun; 4 × single 3"/50 caliber dual purpose guns; 12 × 20 mm AA guns

USS Patuxent (AO-44) was a Kennebec-class oiler in the United States Navy during World War II. She was the second U.S. Navy ship named for the Patuxent River in Maryland.

The type T2-A tanker was laid down under Maritime Commission contract (MC hull 159) on 5 March 1942 as SS Emmkay by the Sun Shipbuilding & Drydock Co. (hull number 228) at Chester, Pennsylvania, for the Keystone Co. She was launched on 25 July 1942, sponsored by Mrs. W. H. Blanchard, acquired by the Navy from the Maritime Commission on 28 September 1942, converted by the Maryland Drydock Company, Baltimore, Maryland, and commissioned on 22 October 1942.

== Service history ==
=== 1942–1944 ===
On 12 November 1942, Patuxent reported to the U.S. Naval Base, Norfolk, Virginia, for duty. On 17 December she sailed for Curaçao in the Dutch West Indies and on 27 December transited the Panama Canal. Steaming across the Pacific, she operated with Task Group 62.9 during February 1943 in the capture and defense of Guadalcanal. During this campaign she supplied aviation gasoline to the Guadalcanal airstrips.

She next sailed for the United States via the Fiji Islands arriving San Pedro, California, on 6 March. Following overhaul, she again departed for South Pacific. During the ensuing months, Patuxent fueled ships and airfields during consolidation operations in the southern Solomons. From 10 July to 20 November, she made runs between Espiritu Santo, New Hebrides, and Guadalcanal and Florida Islands, with two cruises to Nouméa, New Caledonia.

During these runs she fueled the fleet in Purvis Bay and Tulagi Harbor, Florida Island, and pumped aviation gasoline to Henderson Field and other fighter strips on Guadalcanal. She departed Nouméa on 20 November and carried gasoline to Wellington, New Zealand. Patuxent next made fueling runs which lasted throughout the month of December. On 30 December she got underway from Purvis Bay for her first rendezvous with major ships of the fleet for fueling-at-sea operations. Supporting strikes off Kavieng, New Ireland on 31 December 1943 to 1 January 1944, she fueled two carriers and three destroyers. She sailed to Espiritu Santo on 10 January 1944 and steamed between Guadalcanal and the New Hebrides until 9 March.

On 8 April 1944, Patuxent proceeded to her second refueling-at-sea rendezvous. She then returned via Purvis Bay, to the States, reaching San Pedro, California on 10 May 1944 for overhaul. Departing the West Coast on 19 June, she joined the logistic support group in the Marianas campaign supporting the occupation of Saipan.

She returned to Eniwetok on 8 August and joined a large group of fleet oilers, cargo ships, tugs, escorts and, 12 days later, sortied from Eniwetok for maneuvers, proceeding to Manus Island in the Admiralty Islands group.

Departing Manus on 6 September, Patuxent steamed with the logistic support group for the Palau Island campaign. After a week fueling-at-sea, she returned to Seeadler Harbor. On the 18th she returned to the Palau area, fueled, and headed to rendezvous east of the Philippine Islands to fuel the fast carrier task force striking there on 9–24 September. She returned to Seeadler Harbor on 8 October.

On 13 October she followed the Philippine invading forces out of Seeadler Harbor and proceeded to the Philippine area once more, participating in the logistic support operations off the east coast. Patuxent was with the task group off Luzon when the Japanese sent their fleet to wipe out the Leyte beachhead. Orders arrived to head east at flank speed. The task group raced to the Western Carolines, arriving at Ulithi on 30 October, Patuxent's home port for the next ten months.

Returning to the Philippine area again 2 November, she operated with the logistic support group. Typhoon Cobra hit the fueling area on 18 December, sent three destroyers to the bottom and badly damaged several other ships. Although handicapped with a damaged boom, Patuxent fueled the storm-battered ships and then set course for Ulithi.

=== 1945–1946 ===
Patuxent departed Ulithi on 7 January 1945. She joined the Fast Carrier Task Group, then preparing for a sortie into the South China Sea. During this period the fleet struck the China coast and Formosa, and also supported operations at Lingayen Gulf, Luzon. Under the cover of night, the oilers entered the South China Sea and fueled the 3rd Fleet. Japanese Army camps were in sight on the shore, and unidentified aircraft passed overhead during the night. This cruise into the South China Sea ended Patuxent's part in the recapture and liberation of the Philippine Islands.

Patuxent departed Ulithi on 8 February, for the Volcano Islands area and the Iwo Jima campaign. The task group swung southwest to stand by while the combat ships went in to support the beachheads.

After an explosion and fire forward, Patuxent steamed to Saipan for repairs, arriving on 19 February 1945, then steamed to Ulithi. Departing there on 22 March she rejoined her task group in the logistic support of the fleet for the Okinawa invasion. In the next two months, Patuxent made four voyages from Ulithi to fueling areas off Okinawa. After Okinawa had been secured, Patuxent steamed to the Philippines, arriving at San Pedro Bay on 14 June, before joining the logistic group of the 3rd Fleet at Ulithi the 24th.

Patuxent supported strikes against Japan from 10 July until 5 August. After replenishing at Ulithi the oiler was steaming to rejoin the support group off Honshū when the news of Japan's capitulation reached the ship. On 4 September, two days after the formal surrender ceremony there, she steamed into Tokyo Bay with the occupation forces.

On 16 September she headed home via Eniwetok, arrived at San Francisco on 24 October and reported for inactivation to the Commandant of the 12th Naval District.

On 18 January 1946, she was moved to the Graham Shipyards, Oakland, and decommissioned there on 21 February 1946. She was struck from the Navy List on 12 March 1946, and transferred to the War Shipping Administration for disposal on 1 July 1946. She was subsequently sold to the Pure Oil Co., Chicago, Illinois, and operated out of Baltimore as SS David D. Irwin.

== Awards ==
Patuxent received eight battle stars for World War II service.
