= USS Neshanic =

Oiler of the United States Navy

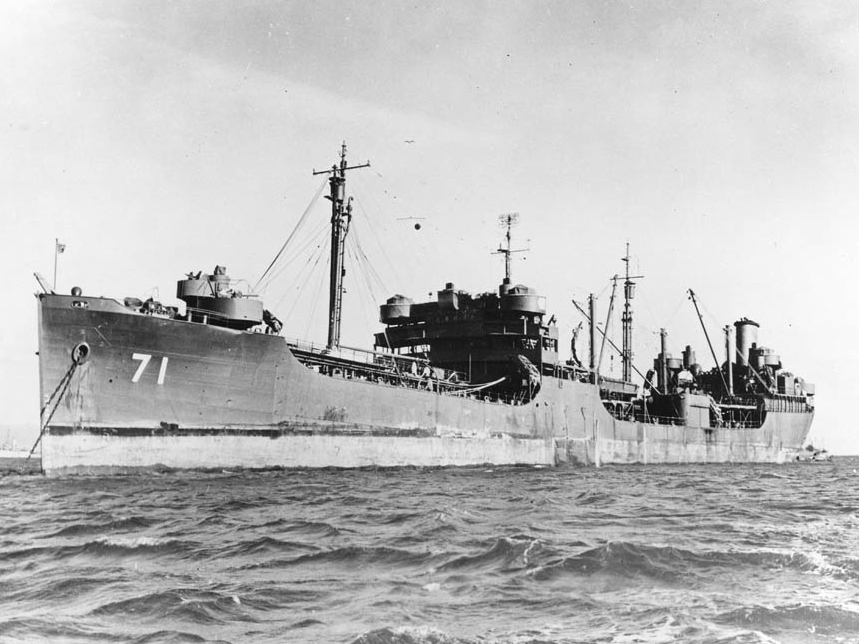
- USS Neshanic at San Francisco, California in November 1945

History

United States
- Name: Neshanic
- Namesake: Neshanic River
- Laid down: 11 June 1942
- Launched: 31 October 1942
- Commissioned: 20 February 1943
- Decommissioned: 19 December 1945
- Stricken: 8 January 1946
- Identification: IMO number: 5234395; Callsign: WDD2877
- Honours and awards: 9 battle stars for World War II service
- Fate: Sold by the MARAD in 1946 became a tanker, and later a Great Lakes freighter

General characteristics In US Navy service
- Class & type: Kennebec-class oiler
- Type: MARAD T3-S-A1
- Tonnage: 16,543 DWT
- Displacement: 21,077 tons
- Length: 501 ft 7.75 in (152.9017 m)
- Beam: 68 ft (21 m)
- Draft: 29 ft 10.5 in (9.106 m)
- Depth: 37 ft (11 m)
- Installed power: 7,000 shp (5,200 kW)
- Propulsion: 1x Bethlehem Steel turbine, single screw
- Speed: 15.3 knots (28.3 km/h; 17.6 mph)
- Range: 14,500 nmi (26,900 km; 16,700 mi)
- Capacity: 133,800 bbl (~18,250 t)
- Complement: 13 officers, 200 enlisted
- Armament: 1 × single 5"/38 caliber gun mount; 4 × single 3"/50 caliber gun mounts; 4 × twin 40 mm AA gun mounts; 6 × twin 20 mm AA gun mounts

USS Neshanic (AO-71) is a former T3 Kennebec-class oiler constructed for the United States Navy during World War II. She was the only U.S. Navy ship named for the Neshanic River in New Jersey.

== History ==
Neshanic was built as the SS Marquette, ex MC hull 519 under Maritime Commission contract by the Bethlehem Shipyard, Inc., Sparrows Point, Maryland. The ship was launched with the name Neshanic on 31 October 1942, sponsored by Mrs. Richard C. Culyer. The tanker was acquired by the US Navy and commissioned on 20 February 1943.

Following shakedown, Neshanic cleared Hampton Roads in convoy on 20 April 1943, and sailed for Aruba, Netherlands West Indies, whence she steamed, on the 27th, with a full cargo of petroleum products, for the Pacific to join the vital chain supplying American forces fighting in the Solomons. She arrived at Nouméa, New Caledonia, delivered part of her cargo, and then continued on to the New Hebrides to discharge the remainder at Espiritu Santo and Efate. From Efate, she returned to the United States, arriving at San Pedro, Los Angeles on 19 June. Thence she commenced a series of supply runs to the Hawaiian and Aleutian Islands. Operating amongst the latter, in August, she provided logistical support to the newly established Naval Operating Base, Adak, and the air facilities at Adak, Attu and Shemya, in addition to fueling, at sea and in harbors, ships assigned to the protection of and extension of American and Canadian control in those islands.

In October, the tanker returned to duty in the Central Pacific. Sailing from San Pedro on the 2nd, she arrived at Nadi, Fiji Islands, on the 31st to commence harbor fueling operations for the vessels preparing to rejoin the fighting in the Solomons and those preparing for the invasion of the Gilberts, at Tarawa and Makin, on 20 November. Before returning to San Pedro on 18 December, she completed two underway fueling missions in support of those operations.

After a brief respite at San Pedro, Neshanic returned to Pearl Harbor, underwent training exercises, and on 22 January 1944 set out to supply the fuel needed for the Marshalls' campaign. On 31 January, Marines and Army troops landed on Kwajalein and Majuro atolls, while Eniwetok came under attack by the fast carrier group. On 4 February, the tanker Neshanic arrived at the second named, reported to Task Group 50.17, and fueled ships. Between the 7th and 18th, she completed a replenishment trip to the Ellice Islands and then steamed to Kwajalein where she served as station tanker, at Roi, until departing for Pearl Harbor on 6 March. Back at Majuro on 26 March, she soon departed to refuel ships operating in the Carolines and off New Guinea, operating out of Seeadler Harbor, Manus, Admiralties, after 20 April. Refueling the fast carriers twice before heading back to Hawaii, she procured another cargo at Pearl Harbor and immediately sailed west again, to Eniwetok. Thence, on 13 June, she proceeded to a fueling area off Saipan.

Off Saipan on 18 June, her support force was subjected to almost continuous Japanese air attacks from 1640 to 1830. At 1641, several bombs landed close aboard Neshanic, with no damage to the tanker. A minute later, however, a 100 lb (45 kg) bomb landed on her cargo deck, aft on the starboard side, amongst drums containing lube oil. The bomb, without piercing the deck and the fuel oil tanks below, set off fires and blew fragments which cut fuel hoses and destroyed fueling station rigs and bridge fittings. The fires, which were brought under immediate control, caused 1st, 2nd and 3rd degree burns to 33 of the damage control party, while retaliation was gained, to some extent, by the splashing of a "Zeke" and a "Tony" by the gun crews. That night the damaged tanker refueled the vessels which, the next day, went out to meet the enemy in what would be known as the Battle of the Philippine Sea.

Neshanic sailed to Eniwetok for repairs and then returned to the Marianas to support the Guam offensive, retiring to Eniwetok again on 26 July. Proceeding from there to San Pedro, she underwent overhaul and returned to the Admiralties on 24 October to serve as station tanker at Manus until 29 January 1945. On that date she sailed for Ulithi, proceeding from there to Saipan, from which she sortied on 21 February to resupply the forces engaged in fighting in the Iwo Jima area.

She returned to Ulithi on 7 March, departing again on the 26th to rendezvous with the forces preparing the way for the Okinawa assault. On 1 and 2 April, she remained in the refueling area to the southeast of the Ryūkyūs, proceeding, on the 3rd, to Kerama Retto. For the next five months she continued to provide logistical support for Operation Iceberg, returning to Ulithi when necessary for replenishment.

At Ulithi when the war ended, on 14 August she conducted one more underway replenishment mission from that base before departing for Tokyo Bay on 21 September. Arriving in the Japanese home islands on the 26th, she remained until 24 October when she got underway for the United States. She arrived at Norfolk, Virginia on 28 November and decommissioned on 19 December. On 8 January 1946, she was struck from the Navy List.

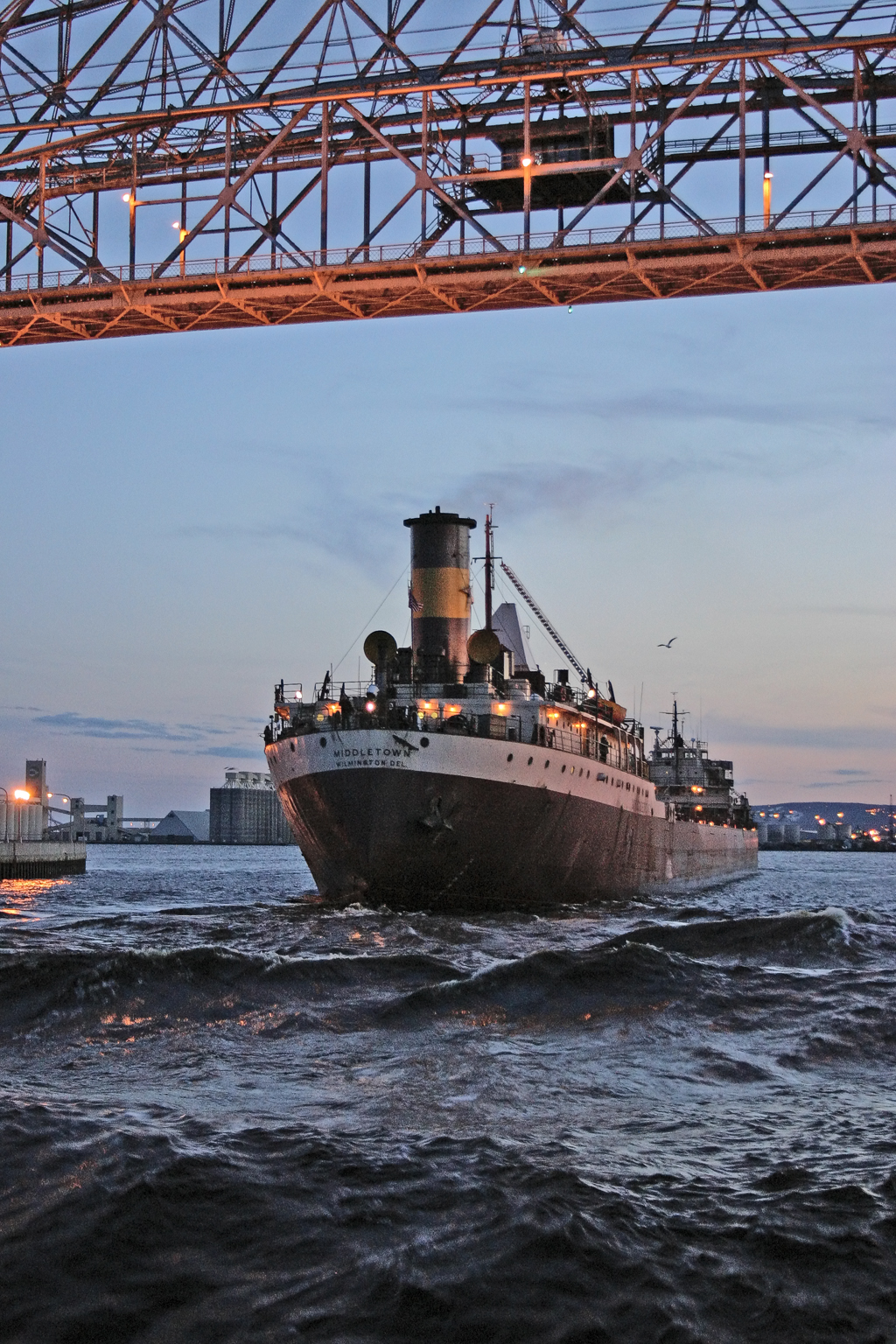
Sailing as Middletown into Duluth harbor

== Post-war ==
On 28 June 1946, was transferred to the custody of the Maritime Commission. Later sold by that agency, she was placed in service as SS Gulfoil by the Gulf Oil Corporation, Philadelphia, Pennsylvania. Gulfoil hauled oil until 7 August 1958, when the ship collided with the gasoline tanker S.E. Graham near Newport, Rhode Island. Both ships burst into flames and grounded with the Graham being a total loss, but her entire crew survived, however most of Gulfoil's crew died but the heavily damaged Gulfoil was salvaged and taken to Baltimore.

The ship was rebuilt as a straight deck bulk carrier and lengthened from 500 feet (150 m) to 730 feet (220 m), the maximum size for the new Saint Lawrence Seaway, re-entering service in 1961. She was sold to Pioneer Steamship Co., and renamed SS Pioneer Challenger. She was again resold in 1962 to the Oglebay Norton Corporation, renamed SS Middletown. In 1982, she was converted to a self-unloading bulk carrier by Bay Shipbuilding Company at Sturgeon Bay. In 1986, off Wisconsin, Middletown suffered an explosion in its boiler room caused by methane offgassing from its coal cargo. Several crewmembers were injured.

She was sold in 2006, to Liberty Steamship Company, a wholly owned subsidiary of American Steamship, and renamed SS American Victory. She was still operational on the Great Lakes in 2008, but was subsequently in long-term lay-up.

In December 2017 Algoma Central was reported to have purchased her and three others from American Steamship Company. However, in May 2018, was sold for scrap, and was towed to the Aliağa Ship Breaking Yard in June 2018.

During the construction of the latest ship on the Great Lakes, the MV Mark W. Barker, the Victory's self-unloader boom was recycled and put on the Barker.

== Awards and honors ==
Neshanic (AO-71) received nine battle stars for World War II service.

She was authorized:

Navy Occupation Service Medal (with Asia clasp)
