= USS Millicoma =

Oiler of the United States Navy

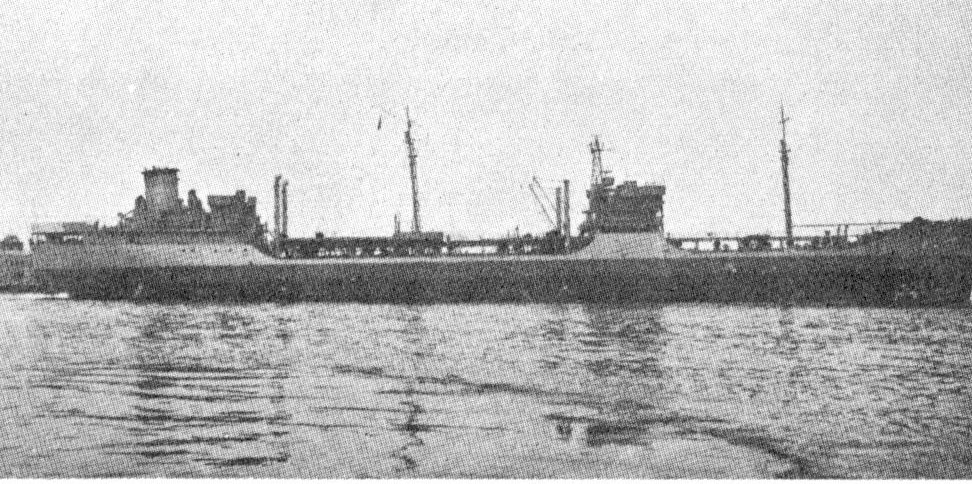

History

United States
- Name: USS Millicoma
- Namesake: Millicoma River, a tributary of the Coos River in southwestern Oregon.
- Ordered: as King’s Mountain
- Builder: Sun Shipbuilding & Drydock Co., Chester, Pennsylvania
- Laid down: 4 August 1942
- Launched: 21 January 1943
- Acquired: 30 January 1943
- Commissioned: 5 March 1943 at Baltimore, Maryland
- Decommissioned: 21 February 1946 at San Francisco, California
- Stricken: 31 March 1986
- Reinstated: 28 April 1950
- Identification: Hull number: T-AO-73; IMO number: 7737420
- Honors and awards: Eight battle stars for World War II service
- Fate: Transferred to MSTS, 1 October 1949, scrapped 1987

General characteristics
- Class & type: Suamico-class oiler
- Displacement: 5,730 tons light; 21,880 tons full load
- Length: 523 ft 6 in (159.56 m)
- Beam: 68 ft (21 m)
- Draft: 30 ft (9.1 m)
- Propulsion: Turbo-electric, single screw, 8,000 hp (5,966 kW)
- Speed: 15.5 knots (28.7 km/h; 17.8 mph)
- Capacity: 140,000 barrels (22,000 m^{3})
- Complement: 251 officers and enlisted
- Armament: 1 × 5"/38 caliber gun; 4 × 3"/50 caliber guns; 4 × twin 40 mm AA guns; 4 × twin 20 mm AA guns

USS Millicoma (AO-73) was a United States Navy fleet oiler which served in the Pacific Theatre during World War II, winning eight battle stars for her dangerous work. Post-war she was recommissioned and was placed under the control of the MSTS with a civilian crew until finally assigned for disposal in 1987.

Millicoma was laid down as King’s Mountain under United States Maritime Commission contract by Sun Shipbuilding & Drydock Co., Chester, Pennsylvania, on 4 August 1942; subsequently renamed USS Conestoga; launched as USS Millicoma on 21 January 1943; sponsored by Mrs. M. G. Hogan; acquired by the U.S. Navy on 30 January 1943; converted for Navy use by the Maryland Drydock Company of Baltimore, Maryland, and commissioned at Baltimore on 5 March 1943.

== Service in World War II ==
For more than two years Millicoma provided valuable at-sea logistics support as the might of American seapower moved westward across the Pacific Ocean to crush the warring Japanese Empire. Refueling and replenishment operations sent her throughout the Pacific to the islands of Polynesia, Melanesia, and Micronesia as well as to the home islands of Japan.

During her Pacific Ocean service she refueled scores of ships ranging in size from battleships and aircraft carriers to destroyers and auxiliaries. She transferred thousands of barrels of oil and thousands of gallons of gasoline to the fighting ships of the fleet and thus helped the Navy press the war to a successful conclusion.

Departing Norfolk, Virginia, on 20 April 1943, Millicoma steamed via the Dutch West Indies and the Panama Canal to carry a cargo of fuel oil and gasoline to the Fiji Islands. During the remainder of 1943 she continued to carry vital liquid cargoes to American bases in the South Pacific.

Operating out of San Pedro, California, she made several runs to the Society Islands, the New Hebrides, New Caledonia, and New Zealand. Thence, after completing a round trip to Hawaii and back, she departed San Pedro on 13 January 1944 to begin supporting the Navy's series of island‑hopping campaigns.

Millicoma refueled ships off the Marshall Islands prior to and during the invasion; thence, arriving Majuro on 4 February, she served as station oiler in the Marshalls until sailing for the New Hebrides on 2 March. Between 31 March and 15 April she cruised north of the Solomon Islands and refueled ships of Task Force 58 following intensive air strikes in the western Caroline Islands. After returning to San Pedro on 9 May, she underwent overhaul and on 20 June sailed to resume fleet oiler duty in the Marshall Islands.

Early in July she cruised for similar duty in the Marianas, and during the next month she supported fleet operations off Tinian, Guam, and Rota. She returned to Eniwetok on 12 August, and between 26 and 31 August steamed to the Admiralties for duty with the At Sea Logistics Support Group (Task Group 30.8). Early in September she refueled ships of the fast carrier task force during sweeping, hard-hitting strikes from the Palaus to the southern Philippines. At 0434 on 10 September, while maneuvering in a hazy half-light, she was involved in a collision with USS Schuylkill (AO-76). Schuylkill's bow struck her sister ship on her starboard quarter, which opened a 40-foot hole, including her steering engine room. Her 5" and 3" gun mounts were also demolished. She made repairs at Seeadler Harbor alongside the newly arrived USS Jason (AR-8) and sailed for Terminal Island, California 9 days later.

Millicoma returned to the U.S. West Coast on 19 October. Departing San Pedro, California, on 1 December, she steamed via Pearl Harbor and Eniwetok to Ulithi where she resumed duty with Task Group 30.8. She sortied 3 January 1945 and during the next three weeks cruised the replenishment areas in the western Pacific and refueled the fast carriers during far-reaching operations against Japanese installations on Luzon, Formosa, China, Indochina, and the Ryukyus.

Millicoma served out of Ulithi during the remainder of World War II as she continued a busy pace of fleet replenishment operations which carried her to the heart of the Japanese Empire. In late February and early March she replenished ships during the conquest of Iwo Jima. Besides fuel, she provided ships with foodstuffs, medical supplies, ammunition, and mail.

Thence, beginning on 13 March, she sailed on the first of four major fueling operations in support of the invasion and conquest of Okinawa. She carried out additional deployments on 30 March, 22 April, and 30 May, and each of the four runs lasted about two weeks.

While cruising with Task Group 30.8 on the fourth deployment, she battled typhoon seas on 4–5 June. Sixty-foot waves and winds in excess of 100 knots (190 km/h; 120 mph) destroyed her fueling booms and cracked her foremast. She returned to Ulithi on 11 June for repairs, thence departed for Okinawa on 28 June to begin shuttling fuel to the newest of the American bases in the western Pacific. She completed two round trips to the Ryukyus and returned to Ulithi where she received news of Japanese capitulation.

Millicoma steamed to Japanese waters on 8 September and refueled minesweep and support ships off Sasebo, Kyūshū. She replenished more than 60 ships in less than two days. She arrived Sasebo on the 29th to continue logistics support of minesweeping operations, and between 22 and 25 October she refueled ships in the Yellow Sea along the coast of Korea.

== Post-War operations ==
Millicoma arrived at San Francisco, California, on 19 November, and decommissioned there on 21 February 1946. Her name was struck from the Navy list on 12 March, and she was transferred to the Maritime Commission in June. Reacquired by the Navy in February 1948 for use as a naval tanker, she was transferred to MSTS on 1 October 1949. Her name was reinstated on the Navy list on 28 April 1950.

Millicoma, crewed by civilian sailors, operated under MSTS on a contract charter basis to carry liquid cargoes along the coasts of the United States and to American bases overseas. Between June 1952 and June 1954, she bolstered the sea supply lines between Japan and South Korea. After the Korean War she continued wide-ranging fueling runs under MSTS, primarily in the Atlantic Ocean and the Caribbean.

Millicoma was transferred to MARAD for disposal on 2 February 1987 and sold for scrap.

== Awards ==
Millicoma received eight battle stars for World War II service.
