= USS Kankakee =

Oiler of the United States Navy

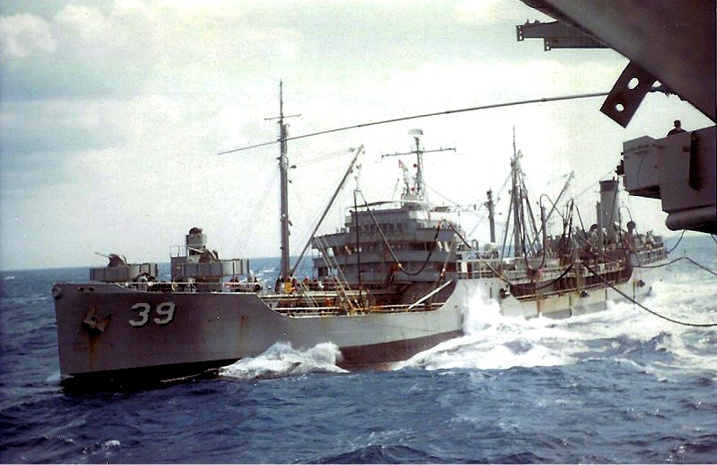
- USS Kankakee during underway replenishment

History

United States
- Name: USS Kankakee
- Namesake: Kankakee River
- Builder: Bethlehem Sparrows Point Shipyard
- Launched: 24 January 1942
- Acquired: 31 March 1942
- Commissioned: 4 May 1942
- Decommissioned: 30 November 1955
- Recommissioned: 20 December 1956
- Decommissioned: 4 November 1957
- Reinstated: 1 September 1961
- Recommissioned: 29 November 1961
- Stricken: 1 January 1973
- Honors and awards: 6 battle stars (World War II); 1 battle star (Korea)
- Fate: Scrapped May 1976

General characteristics
- Class & type: Kennebec class oiler
- Type: MARAD T2
- Tonnage: 15,910 DWT
- Displacement: 21,077 tons
- Length: 501 ft 8 in (152.91 m)
- Beam: 68 ft (21 m)
- Draft: 29 ft 8.5 in (9.055 m)
- Depth: 37 ft (11 m)
- Installed power: 12,000 shp (8,900 kW)
- Propulsion: geared steam turbine; single screw
- Speed: 16.5 knots (30.6 km/h)
- Range: 8,000 nmi (15,000 km; 9,200 mi)
- Capacity: 130,000 bbl (~18,000 t)
- Complement: 214–247
- Armament: 1 × 5"/38 caliber gun mounts; 4 × 3"/50 caliber gun mounts; 8 × 40 mm AA gun mounts; 8 × 20 mm AA gun mounts; 2 × depth charge projectors

USS Kankakee (AO-39) was a Kennebec-class fleet oiler of the United States Navy. The ship was built as SS Colina by Bethlehem Steel Co., Sparrows Point, Maryland (hull number 4358 and Maritime Commission number 146), launched on 24 January 1942, sponsored by Mrs. D. A. Little, acquired for the Navy on 31 March through the Maritime Commission from her owner, Socony-Vacuum Oil Company (later renamed Mobil Oil), New York City, and commissioned as Kankakee at Norfolk, Virginia, on 4 May.

== Service history ==
=== 1942–1943 ===
Departing Norfolk on 1 June 1942, Kankakee transported a cargo of fuel oil from Baton Rouge, Louisiana, to Coco Solo, Panama Canal Zone, and arrived San Francisco via San Pedro on 14 July for additional conversion.

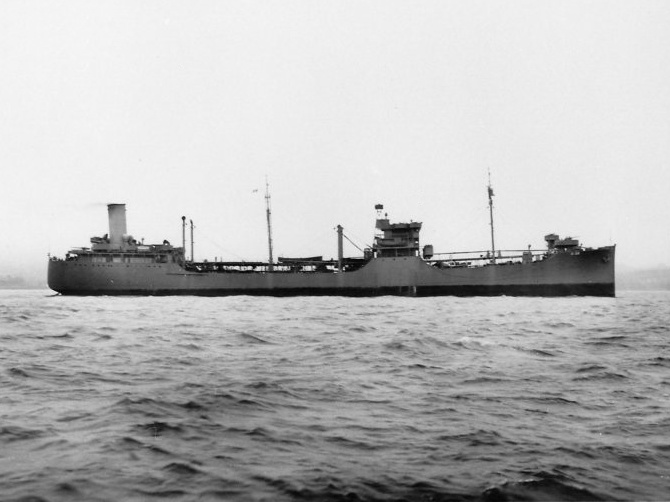
USS Kankakee (AO-39) in 1942.

She cleared the Golden Gate on 27 August and steamed to Nouméa, New Caledonia, arriving on 18 September to commence duty as a unit of ServRon 8. Sailing between New Caledonia, the New Hebrides, the Fijis, and Pearl Harbor, she spent the next seven months refueling combat ships and convoys engaged in the struggle for the Solomon Islands. She departed Nouméa on 18 April 1943 and arrived San Pedro on 3 May for a six-week overhaul before returning to the South Pacific on 19 June.

Reaching Nouméa on 8 July, she resumed refueling, cargo, and passenger runs, serving the 3rd Fleet between the New Hebrides and Solomon Islands. Sailing to the south of Guadalcanal on 1 November, she refueled Admiral Frederick C. Sherman's fast carriers, Saratoga (CV-3) and Princeton (CVL-23), on 3 to 4 November in preparation for a surprise air strike against Japanese shipping at Rabaul on the 5th.

=== 1944 ===
From 21 February to 2 March 1944 she replenished destroyers to the east of New Ireland as they attacked the Bismarck Barrier with bombardments on Kavieng and Rabaul. Captain Arleigh Burke, Commander of the "Little Beavers" (DesRon 23) and later Chief of Naval Operations, commended Kankakee as the "most efficient tanker we have met." And while on a similar mission on 22 to 30 March, she refueled carriers of a task force as they sailed to launch destructive air strikes on 30 March to 1 April against the enemy-held Palau, Yap, and Woleai Islands in the Western Carolines. Loaded with fuel oil and gasoline, she next refueled escort ships engaged in the Saipan landings. On 14 July she returned to San Diego for a short upkeep.

Kankakee departed the West Coast on 24 August; she arrived at Kossol Roads, Palaus, on 10 October to serve as station tanker until 1 November when she shifted her base to Ulithi, Western Carolines. From there she provided logistics support to ships that were hitting the enemy from the Philippines to the "home islands".

=== 1945 ===
Throughout November and December 1944 and January 1945 she replenished Task Force 38 during the attacks on Luzon, Formosa, the China Coast, and French Indochina. Departing Ulithi on 8 February, she steamed northward and remained at sea until 3 March to refuel carriers, battleships, cruisers, and destroyers of the 5th Fleet engaged in the savage struggle for Iwo Jima and the supporting carrier air strikes on Tokyo. After renewing her cargo at Ulithi, she sailed on 13 March to supply carriers, including Franklin (CV-13) and Langley (CVL-27) as they were conducting air strikes on Kyūshū, the Inland Sea, and the Ryukyus. On 1 April, as landings on Okinawa progressed, Kankakee departed Southern Anchorage, Ulithi, for logistic support duty off Okinawa. Under the operational command of Rear Admiral Donald B. Beary, Commander ServRon 6, she furnished fuel and supplies at sea to ships of the 5th Fleet. During much of the next three months she helped maintain their striking power and mobility in the last great amphibious campaign of the war. Completing her Ryukyus duty on 14 June, she resumed support on 3 July for the 3rd Fleet as Task Force 38 conducted devastating aerial and naval bombardments on the "home islands" from Hokkaidō to the Inland Sea. Kankakee steamed southeast of Japan as offensive operations ceased on 15 August; but she maintained logistic support until her return to Ulithi on 5 September. After putting into Tokyo Bay on 20 September, she proceeded to the United States, arriving San Pedro on 18 November for overhaul.

=== 1946–1955 ===
Assigned to the Naval Overseas Transportation Service (NOTS) on 28 February 1946, Kankakee departed San Pedro on 13 March to serve as station tanker in Japan and China. For much of the next five years, she cruised the North Pacific Ocean from Alaska to the Philippines. During 1946 and 1947 she transported fuel oil from Bahrein in the Persian Gulf to Japan and the Philippines.

Now assigned to the Military Sea Transportation Service (MSTS), she had an overhaul at Mare Island. Kankakee departed Seattle on 2 February 1951 for duty with the 6th Fleet. She loaded aviation gasoline at Marcus Hook, Pennsylvania, and sailed on 13 March to join Coral Sea (CVB-43) in the Mediterranean on 2 April. Spending four months in support of the 6th Fleet she returned to San Pedro on 7 September. She departed Wilmington, California, on 23 December with a cargo of Korea-bound gasoline. Reaching Pusan on 10 January 1952 after discharging her cargo, she returned via Sasebo, Japan, to San Francisco on 2 February.

Kankakee departed San Francisco on 1 April; after loading fuel oil at Houston, Texas, she sailed on 19 April for the Mediterranean, arriving Oran, Algeria, on 4 May to fuel 6th Fleet carriers. Completing this important duty on 21 November, she transported aviation gasoline from St. Rose, Louisiana, to the West Coast, arriving at Wilmington on 20 December. She conducted fueling operations along the Pacific coast and sailed from San Pedro on 26 August 1953 for deployment with the 6th Fleet. From her departure at Beaumont, Texas, on 12 September to her arrival at New York on 31 May 1955 she conducted two, seven-month deployments to the Mediterranean in support of 6th Fleet operations.

Placed in commission in reserve at Norfolk on 17 August, she was towed to Baltimore on 14 October, thence to Philadelphia on 29 November. She decommissioned on 30 November 1955 and entered the Atlantic Reserve Fleet.

=== 1956–1957 ===
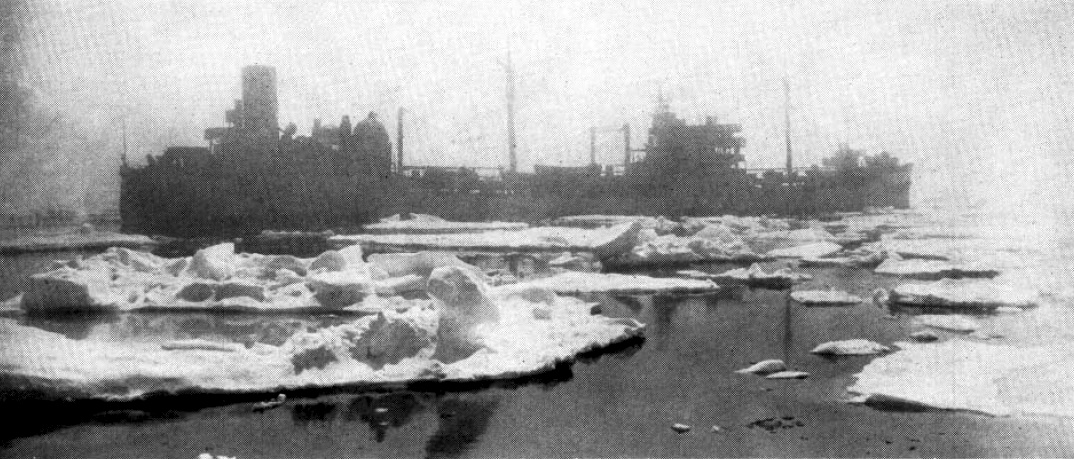
Kankakee in Arctic waters, 1958.

Kankakee recommissioned on 20 December 1956. Reassigned to MSTS, she departed Philadelphia on 26 December for eight months of Atlantic fuel-shuttle duty that carried her from the eastern seaboard and Venezuela to Newfoundland, Labrador, and the coast of western Europe. From 14 to 21 September 1957 she operated out of Portland, England, to support the NATO exercise "Operation Strikeback." Following return to Norfolk on 1 October, she sailed via New York for Port Arthur, Texas, arriving on 4 November. She decommissioned the next day and entered the Maritime Defense Reserve Fleet.

=== 1961–1973 ===
Placed in reserve on 1 February 1959, Kankakee was reinstated on 1 September 1961 and recommissioned on 29 November at New Orleans. Assigned to ServRon 4, she departed New Orleans on 9 December, arriving Newport, Rhode Island, on 15 December. After a Caribbean cruise from 8 January to 8 March 1962, she operated along the Atlantic coast. On 24 October, two days after President Kennedy imposed a naval quarantine against the shipment of Russian offensive missiles into Cuba, Kankakee departed Newport to furnish logistic support for the fleet swiftly assembled there. Before returning to Newport on 5 December, she refueled 89 ships at sea.

Operating out of Newport, the oiler engaged in a variety of missions between 25 February 1963 and 5 June 1964. During June 1963 she participated in joint U.S.-French convoy exercises, and in August she supported Atlantic anti-submarine warfare exercises. Kankakee deployed to the Mediterranean on 3 July. While serving with the 6th Fleet, she refueled and serviced 269 ships and supplied them with more than 29 million US gallons (110,000 m^{3}) of fuel oil and aviation gasoline. During August she supported the Fleet's Cyprus patrol as the United States continued its role of keeping the peace in the Middle East. Her deployment completed, Kankakee returned to Newport on 22 December.

Kankakee operated along the East Coast and in the Caribbean into 1967. One of the highlights of her service occurred in March 1965 when she acted as a recovery unit for NASA's Gemini 3 space flight. On this operation, besides her recovery duty, she refueled other ships of the recovery team. She was also one of the recovery ships for Gemini 12 in November 1966.

Kankakee was decommissioned (date unknown), and stricken from the Naval Vessel Register on 1 January 1973. Transferred to the Maritime Administration (MARAD) for lay up in the National Defense Reserve Fleet, she was sold on 1 April 1976 for scrap.

== Awards ==
Kankakee received six battle stars for World War II service and one for Korean War service.
