= MV Mark W. Barker =

American-built freighter ship

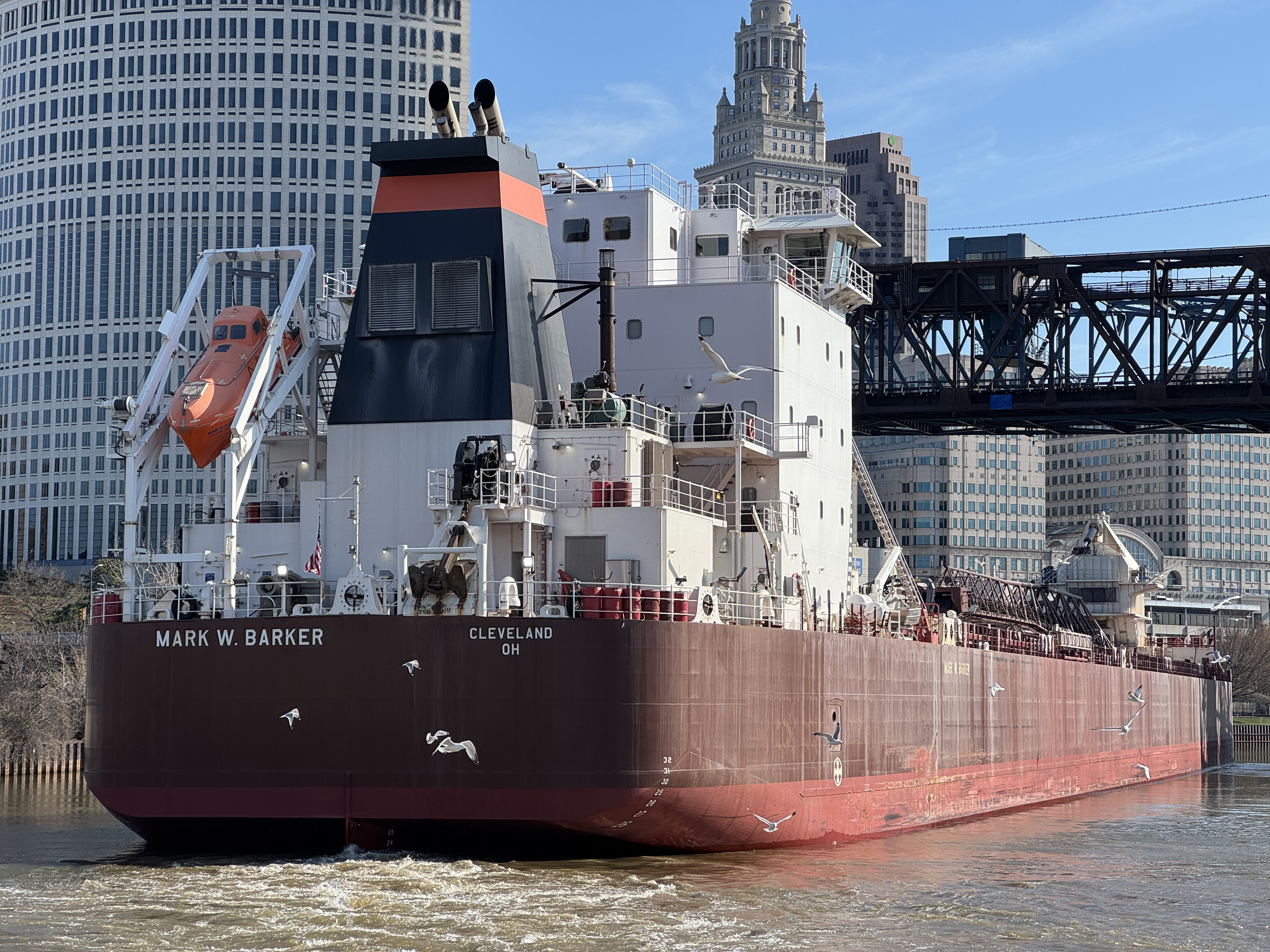
- MV Mark W. Barker sailing up the Cuyahoga River in Cleveland, Ohio, in 2025

History

United States
- Name: MV Mark W. Barker
- Owner: Interlake Steamship Company
- Operator: Interlake Steamship Company
- Port of registry: Cleveland, Ohio
- Builder: Bay Shipbuilding Company
- Launched: 1 July 2022
- Christened: 1 September 2022
- In service: 27 July 2022
- Identification: IMO number: 9962445; MMSI number: 368251670; Callsign: WDM9326
- Status: In service

General characteristics
- Class & type: River-class freighter
- Tonnage: 26,000 GT
- Length: 639 ft (195 m) (overall)
- Beam: 78 ft (24 m)
- Installed power: 8,000 hp (6,000 kW)
- Propulsion: Two Electro-Motive Diesel (EMD) diesel engines
- Speed: 15 miles per hour (13 kn; 24 km/h)
- Crew: 16–17

MV Mark W. Barker is a large diesel-powered lake freighter owned and operated by the Interlake Steamship Company. She is the first of the River-class freighters constructed for an American shipping company. MV Mark W. Barker is the first ship on the Great Lakes to be powered with engines that meet EPA Tier 4 standards. It is the first U.S.-flagged, Jones Act-compliant ship built on the Great Lakes since 1983. The ship is named after the president of the Interlake Steamship Company.

== Description ==
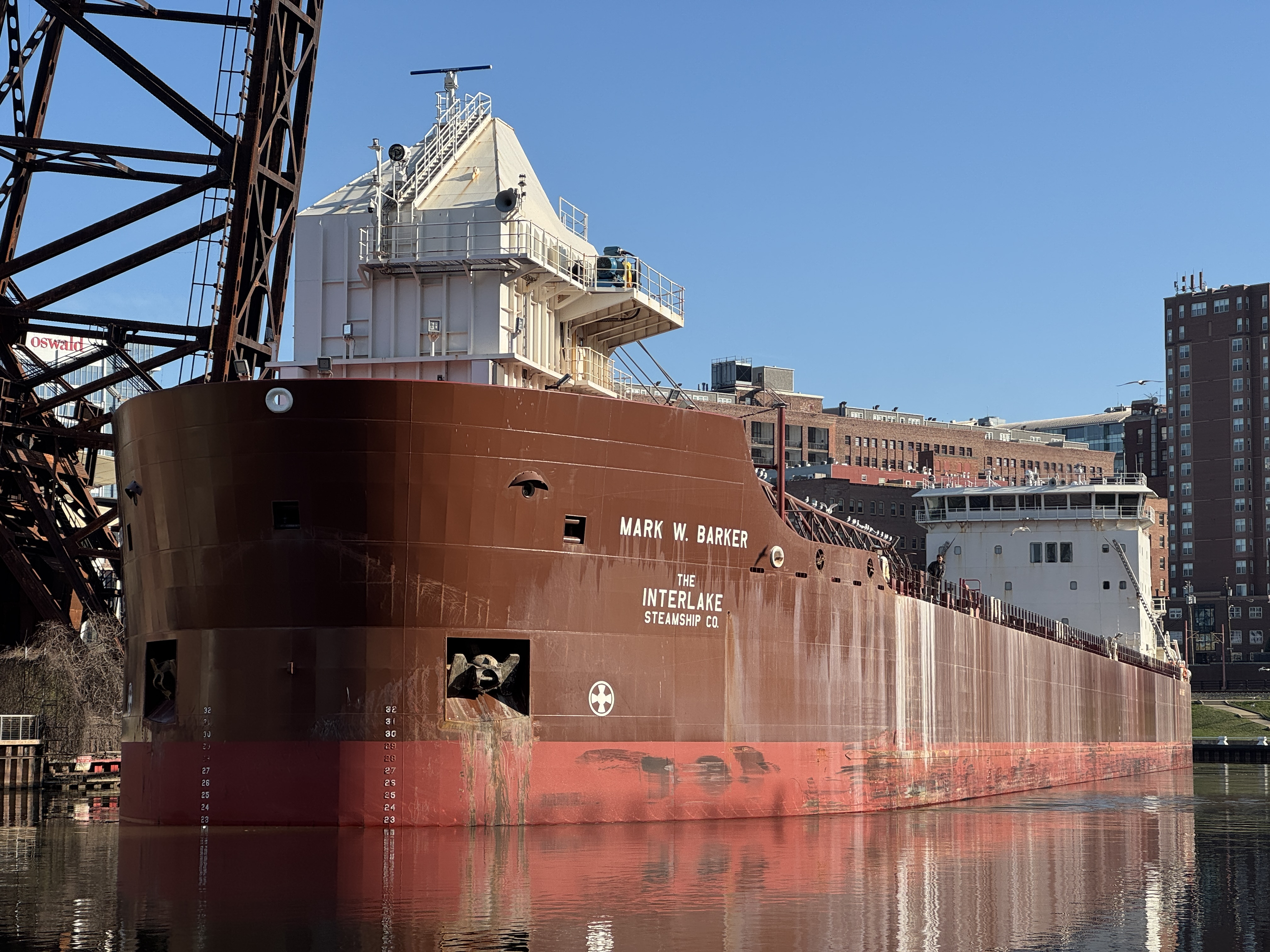
The ship's bow

The vessel was built by Fincantieri Bay Shipbuilding at Sturgeon Bay, Wisconsin. Construction began in mid-2019. Her self-unloader was SS American Victory's boom that was taken off before the ship was scrapped. The ship is 639 feet (195 m) long and has a 78-foot (24 m) beam, with a carrying capacity of 26,000 tons deadweight (DWT). She is designed to carry bulk cargo such as taconite, salt, or limestone, as well as other loads like wind turbine blades. MV Mark W. Barker is powered by two 4,000-horsepower (3,000 kW), 16-cylinder EMD diesel engines. In operation, she is designed for a complement of 16–17 crew.

== Service history ==
Launched in spring 2022, she became the first new American-built lake freighter since 1983, as well as Interlake's first American-built bulk freighter since 1981. The ship underwent sea trials in June and July 2022, sailing under her own power for the first time on July 1, 2022. On July 27, 2022, MV Mark W. Barker began her maiden voyage to Port Inland, Michigan, to load stone for Muskegon, Michigan, thus entering regular service. She was christened on 1 September 2022, in Cleveland, Ohio.

On May 17, 2023, she ran aground in the Detroit River near Belle Isle. She was refloated shortly before 12:30pm local time.
