= USS Lackawanna (AO-40) =

Oiler of the United States Navy

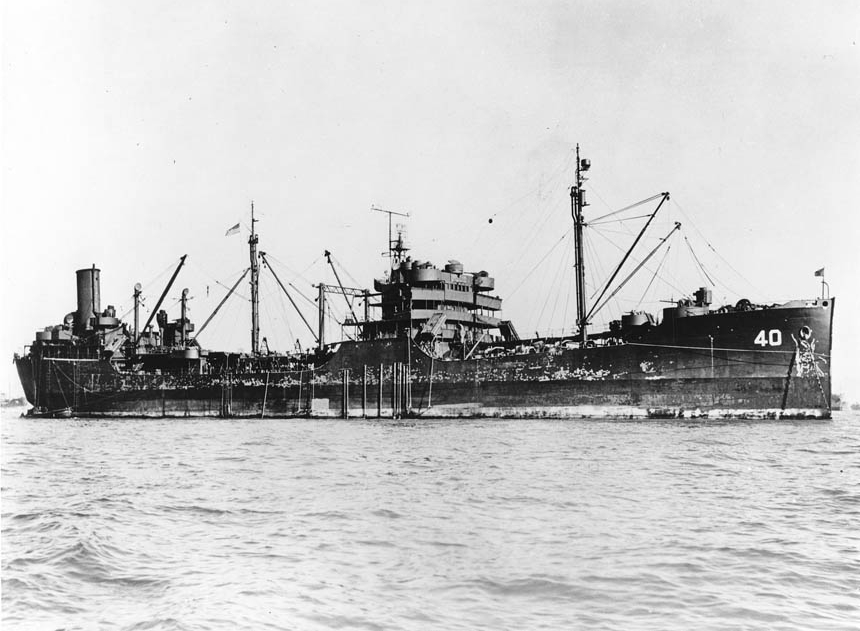
- USS Lackawanna (AO-40) in San Francisco Bay after returning from the Western Pacific in October 1945.

History

United States
- Name: USS Lackawanna
- Namesake: Lackawanna River in Pennsylvania
- Builder: Bethlehem Sparrows Point Shipyard
- Laid down: 27 December 1941
- Launched: 16 May 1942
- Acquired: 20 June 1942
- Commissioned: 10 July 1942
- Decommissioned: 14 February 1946
- Honors and awards: 8 battle stars (World War II)
- Fate: Returned to the Maritime Commission 1 July 1946; Sold, 1947

General characteristics
- Class & type: Kennebec class oiler
- Type: MARAD T2
- Tonnage: 15,910 DWT
- Displacement: 21,077 tons
- Length: 501 ft 8 in (152.91 m)
- Beam: 68 ft (21 m)
- Draft: 29 ft 8.5 in (9.055 m)
- Depth: 37 ft (11 m)
- Installed power: 12,000 shp (8,900 kW)
- Propulsion: geared steam turbine; single screw
- Speed: 16.5 knots (30.6 km/h)
- Range: 8,000 nmi (15,000 km; 9,200 mi)
- Capacity: 130,000 bbl (~18,000 t)
- Complement: 214–247
- Armament: 1 × 5"/38 caliber gun mounts; 4 × 3"/50 caliber gun mounts; 8 × 40 mm AA gun mounts; 8 × 20 mm AA gun mounts; 2 × depth charge projectors

USS Lackawanna (AO-40) was a Kennebec-class type T2 fleet oiler of the United States Navy. The ship was laid down 27 December 1941, as SS Conastoga (hull number 4359), by the Bethlehem-Sparrows Point Shipyard Inc., Sparrows Point, Maryland, under Maritime Commission contract number 147. Launched on 16 May 1942, sponsored by Mrs. S. J. Dickey, acquired by the Navy on 20 June 1942, and commissioned on 10 July 1942 at Baltimore, Lt. Comdr. S. R. Sands Jr., USCG, in command.

== Service history ==
=== 1942–1943 ===
After shakedown Lackawanna departed Norfolk, Virginia, on 15 August 1942 bound for fueling operations in the Pacific. Arriving at New Caledonia on 18 September, the oiler replenished ships out of Nouméa for the next three months. Following overhaul at San Pedro, California, Lackawanna resumed operations as a unit of ServRon 8 in the Central Pacific on 16 February 1943.

The oiler replenished fighting ships for eight months prior to sailing in support of the Gilbert Islands invasion during November. The allied objective of this campaign was to neutralize the threat of Japanese air and seaplane bases on the islands.

=== 1944–1946 ===
Lackawanna's next mission was to refuel units engaged in the invasion of Kwajalein and Majuro. Departing Espiritu Santo on 20 January 1944, she continued support missions in the Marshalls through March. Turning her attention to the removal of other barriers "on the road to Japan," Lackawanna refueled the carrier task forces as they unleashed their devastating raids on Palau, Yap, and Truk during April and May.

As expanding operations established the need for additional staging areas, the fleet prepared for the invasion of the Marianas. On 15 June amphibious assault forces landed on Saipan, and once again the lifeline of the fleet was on hand to refuel the thirsty ships. When Saipan, Tinian, and Guam fell into American control, the stage was set for the return to the Philippines.

The need for advance bases necessitated the invasion of the Palaus, and Lackawanna supported the 3rd Fleet in this operation. With preliminaries complete, the oiler departed Seeadler Harbor in mid-October bound for a refueling area off the Philippines. Providing replenishment services for almost two months, she played a vital role in the successful Philippine campaign.

Lackawanna took departure from Ulithi on 10 December for a brief repair period at San Pedro, California. Returning to the war zone on 6 March, she arrived in time to participate in the largest operation of the Pacific war — Okinawa. Departing Ulithi on 13 March, Lackawanna supported units of the fleet as they made their way to Japan's last stronghold. She continued operations off Okinawa until the island was secure in late June.

With Japan itself the only remaining target, Lackawanna sailed on 3 July to refuel the 3rd Fleet units engaged in raids on the enemy homeland. Following the cessation of hostilities on 14 August, the oiler continued operations in the Far East until she departed Tokyo Bay on 12 October. Arriving at San Francisco two weeks later, Lackawanna remained on the west coast until she decommissioned at Oakland on 14 February 1946.

=== Decommissioning and sale ===
Lackawanna was returned to the Maritime Commission on 1 July 1946. Subsequently, sold to the Socony-Vacuum Oil Company (later renamed Mobil Oil) in 1947, she was renamed SS Tatarrax, then Thomas A. (1962), and Padre Island (1965). The ship was scrapped in Vinaròs, Spain, in January 1967.
