= USS Merrimack (AO-37) =

Kennebec-class fleet oilers built during World War II

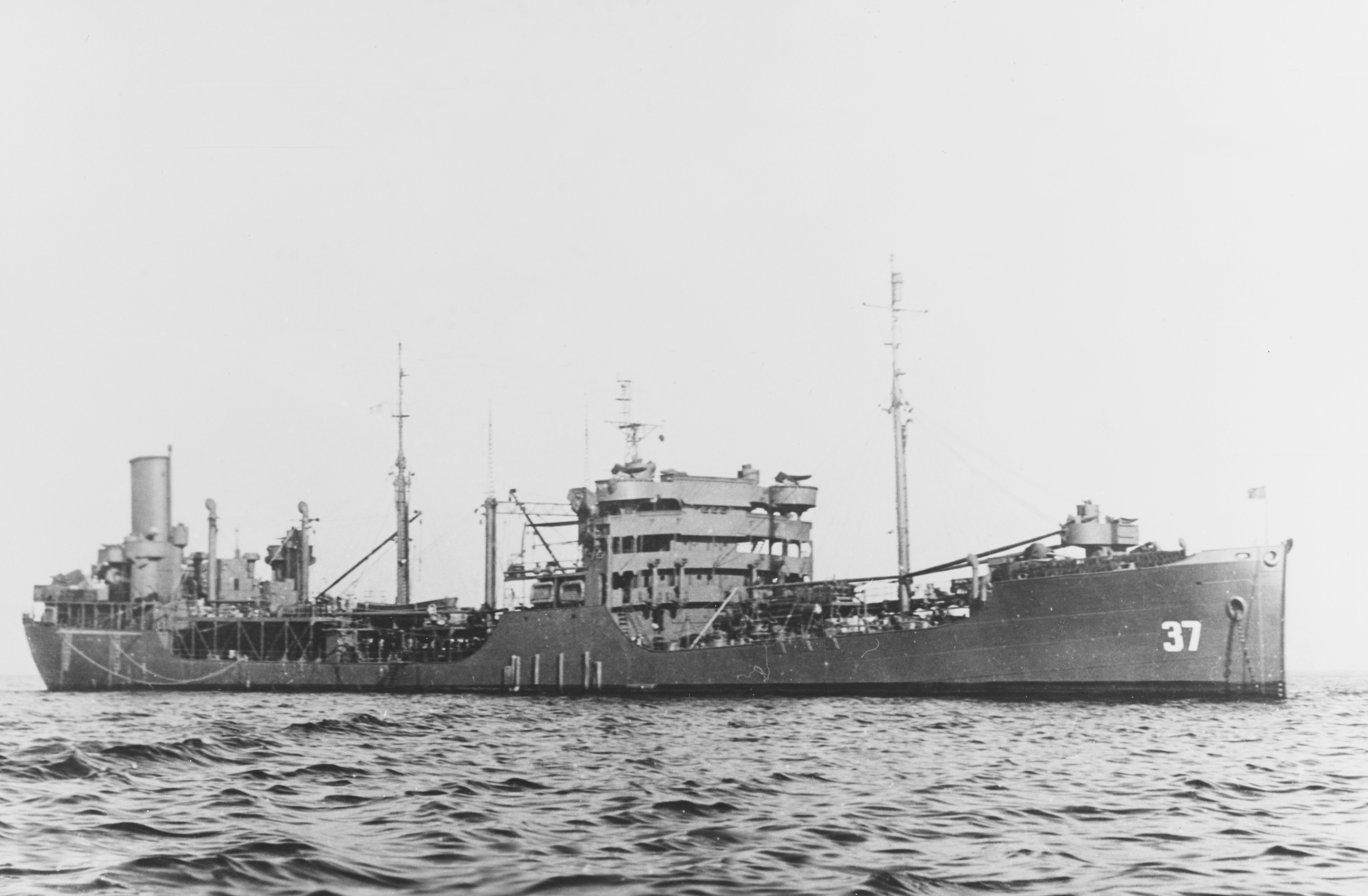
- USS Merrimack (AO-37)

History

United States
- Name: SS Caddo
- Namesake: The Caddo River in Arkansas
- Ordered: 12 September 1940
- Builder: Bethlehem Sparrows Point Shipyard
- Launched: 1 July 1941
- Acquired: 31 December 1941
- Commissioned: 4 February 1942
- Renamed: USS Merrimack 9 February 1942
- Namesake: The Merrimack River in Massachusetts and New Hampshire
- Decommissioned: 8 February 1950
- Recommissioned: 6 December 1950
- Decommissioned: 20 December 1954
- Honors and awards: 8 battle stars (World War II)
- Fate: Sold 19 March 1982

General characteristics
- Class & type: Kennebec class oiler
- Type: MARAD T2
- Tonnage: 15,910 DWT
- Displacement: 21,077 tons
- Length: 501 ft 8 in (152.91 m)
- Beam: 68 ft (21 m)
- Draft: 29 ft 8.5 in (9.055 m)
- Depth: 37 ft (11 m)
- Installed power: 12,000 shp (8,900 kW)
- Propulsion: geared steam turbine; single screw
- Speed: 16.5 knots (30.6 km/h)
- Range: 8,000 nmi (15,000 km; 9,200 mi)
- Capacity: 130,000 bbl (~18,000 t)
- Complement: 214–247
- Armament: 1 × 5"/38 caliber gun mounts; 4 × 3"/50 caliber gun mounts; 8 × 40 mm AA gun mounts; 8 × 20 mm AA gun mounts; 2 × depth charge projectors

The third USS Merrimack (AO-37) (ex-Caddo) was one of five Kennebec-class fleet oilers (also known as a type T2 tanker) built during World War II for service in the United States Navy. She also service in the Cold War. She was named after the Merrimack River in Massachusetts and New Hampshire.

== Construction, acquisition, and commissioning ==
Merrimack was laid down as SS Caddo under Maritime Commission contract on 12 September 1940 by Bethlehem Steel Company, Sparrows Point, Maryland. She was launched on 1 July 1941 and acquired by the U.S. Navy from Socony-Vacuum Oil Company (later Mobil Oil) on 31 December 1941. She was renamed Merrimack on 9 January 1942, and commissioned 4 February 1942.

== Service history ==
Assigned to the Atlantic Fleet, the new fleet oiler spent the next two-and-a-half years steaming the Atlantic seaways carrying oil for Allied ships from Argentia, Newfoundland to Montevideo, Uruguay, and from ports along the United States East Coast to staging areas in the British Isles and the Mediterranean. Her primary duty was fueling the escorts which protected Allied convoys from German U-boats.

Merrimack's most memorable crossing began on 23 October 1942 from Hampton Roads, Virginia, when she sailed with the Southern Attack Group of the Western Naval Task Force for Operation Torch, the invasion of North Africa. Twice during the passage she refueled the ships of the task force. A heavy storm broke on 4 November 1942 threatening the landings, but Admiral H. Kent Hewitt kept to the original plan. The task force's mission was to capture the harbor at Safi, Morocco, to cut off French forces in southern Morocco, and to enable the landing of Major General George S. Patton's tanks for operations against Casablanca.

For more than a year and a half after the landings in Morocco, Merrimack carried oil to support operations in North Africa, Sicily, Italy, and France. On her transatlantic voyages, besides oil, she carried passengers and a wide variety of equipment including PT boats, patrol craft, and aircraft. While steaming toward Casablanca on 22 June 1943, she joined the minesweeper USS Pilot (AM-104) in rescuing 113 survivors from Lot, a French oiler that had been torpedoed.

Merrimack departed Norfolk, Virginia, on 14 October 1944 for the Panama Canal and Ulithi in the Pacific, arriving on 1 December 1944. Allied forces were retaking the Philippine Islands and preparing for operations even closer to the Japanese Home Islands. Merrimack joined the United States Third Fleet's At-Sea Logistics Support Group to fuel the fast carrier task force. She began the new year of 1945 supporting raids on Formosa on 3 and 4 January 1945. The U.S. carriers struck enemy airbases on Luzon, Philippines, on 6 and 7 January to help neutralize Japanese resistance to the invasion of that strategic island which began on the beaches of Lingayen Gulf on 9 January 1945. Naval aircraft which she supported returned to Formosa on the 15th and hit targets along the China coast the following day. They again lashed out at Formosa on the 21st.

From 16 February through 2 March, Merrimack supported the ships covering the landings on Iwo Jima. During the fight for Okinawa, Merrimack alternated between fueling ships involved directly in the landings and the aircraft carriers during raids to on the Japanese Home Islands.

After Okinawa was secured, the Third Fleet concentrated on operations against Japan itself. From 10 through 29 July 1945, Merrimack supported raids of overwhelming force on Japanese targets which hastened the end of the war. Following Japan's capitulation on 15 August 1945, Merrimack made several cruises between the United States West Coast and East Asia bringing oil for ships supporting the occupation of Japan and operating along the coasts of China and Korea. She was assigned to Military Sea Transportation Service (MSTS) in October 1949, shortly before beginning pre-inactivation overhaul. Merrimack was decommissioned on 8 February 1950 and entered the Atlantic Reserve Fleet at Orange, Texas.

After the Korean War began on 25 June 1950 when North Korean forces invaded South Korea, Merrimack was recommissioned on 6 December 1950. Assigned to MSTS, she served the Atlantic Fleet, making periodic deployments to the Mediterranean until she was decommissioned again on 20 December 1954, and entered the Pacific Reserve Fleet at San Diego, California. She was stricken from the Navy List on 4 February 1959, transferred to the Maritime Administration (MARAD), and placed in the National Defense Reserve Fleet at Beaumont, Texas.

Merrimack was disposed of by MARAD exchange on 19 March 1982. She was sold to Eckhardt & Company GmbH, Hamburg, West Germany, for scrapping, and delivered on 29 March 1982 at Beaumont.

== Honors and awards ==
Merrimack received eight battle stars for World War II service.
