= USS Kennebec (AO-36) =

Oiler of the United States Navy

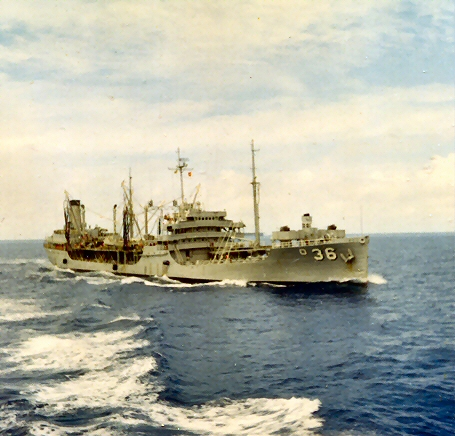
- USS Kennebec

History

United States
- Name: USS Kennebec
- Namesake: Kennebec River
- Ordered: 1 November 1939
- Builder: Bethlehem Sparrows Point Shipyard
- Laid down: 12 August 1940
- Launched: 19 April 1941
- Acquired: 13 January 1942
- Commissioned: 4 February 1942
- Decommissioned: 29 June 1970
- Stricken: 15 July 1976
- Motto: Service God, Country, Fleet
- Honors and awards: 1 battle star (World War II); 7 campaign stars (Vietnam)
- Fate: Scrapped, 1982

General characteristics
- Class & type: Kennebec class oiler
- Type: MARAD T2
- Tonnage: 15,910 DWT
- Displacement: 21,077 tons
- Length: 501 ft 8 in (152.91 m)
- Beam: 68 ft (21 m)
- Draft: 29 ft 8.5 in (9.055 m)
- Depth: 37 ft (11 m)
- Installed power: 12,000 shp (8,900 kW)
- Propulsion: geared steam turbine; single screw
- Speed: 16.5 knots (30.6 km/h)
- Range: 8,000 nmi (15,000 km; 9,200 mi)
- Capacity: 130,000 bbl (~18,000 t)
- Complement: 214–247
- Armament: 1 × 5"/38 caliber gun mounts; 4 × 3-inch/50-caliber gun mounts; 8 × 40 mm AA gun mounts; 8 × 20 mm AA gun mounts; 2 × depth charge projectors

USS Kennebec (AO-36) was originally the SS Corsicana, a Kennebec class T2 tanker that was built by Bethlehem Sparrows Point Shipyard in Sparrows Point, Maryland. It was delivered to Socony-Vacuum Oil Company (later Mobil Oil) on 8 August 1941. It was purchased by the United States Navy on 13 January 1942 and renamed Kennebec.

== Service history ==
The fleet oiler later had an eventful career, in so far as it was decommissioned four times and twice stricken from the Naval Vessel Register. Kennebec was decommissioned on 4 September 1950 at San Diego, California, and laid up in the Pacific Reserve Fleet for only four months. It was already recommissioned on 11 January 1951, at Oakland, California. On 25 September 1954 it was decommissioned, again at San Diego and laid up in the Pacific Reserve Fleet, San Diego Group. It was recommissioned on 14 December 1956, only to be decommissioned again on 31 October 1957. This time the ship was stricken from the Naval Register on 14 January 1959 and transferred to the Maritime Administration (MARAD) for laying up in the National Defense Reserve Fleet. However, Kennebec was reacquired by the U.S. Navy and recommissioned on 16 December 1961. It served the Pacific Fleet during the Vietnam War up to 1970.

The ship decommissioned for the last time on 29 June 1970 at the Naval Inactive Ship Maintenance Facility, Mare Island, Vallejo, California, and transferred to the Maritime Administration (MARAD) for laying up in the National Defense Reserve Fleet. Kennebec was again stricken from the Naval Register on 15 July 1976. On 6 April 1982 it was sold by MARAD to Levin Metals Corporation for $180,077.00, and subsequently scrapped.

== Propeller ==
Today, the ship's only propeller sits outside the Building 1503 at the Norfolk Naval Shipyard. It is a 19 ft 8 in (5.99 m) diameter prop with a 18 ft 10 in (5.74 m) pitch. It was made by Bethlehem Steel Co. at the Staten Island plant. The finish weight was 41,775 lb (18,949 kg).

== Ships Bell ==
Today, the ships bell sits inside the Naval Talent Acquisition Group Pacific Northwest HQ office in Seattle, WA.
