= Sun Shipbuilding & Drydock Co. =

Former American shipbuilding company

Coordinates: 39°50′56″N 75°21′05″W

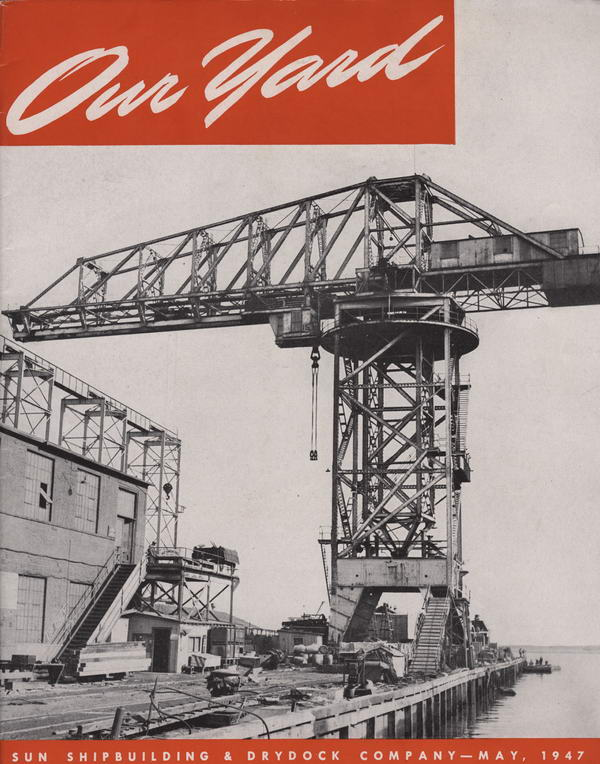
A photo of the "Hammer-head" crane on the cover of the company's newsletter "Our Yard" in 1947.

Sun Shipbuilding & Drydock Company (1917–1982) was a major shipbuilding company in Chester, Pennsylvania with a large shipyard on the Delaware River. Originally built to supply tankers for the Sun oil company (Sunoco), it would later build tankers for their US government and other oil companies, before building many different types of ship's over its 70-year history. During World War II, it participated in the U.S. Government's Emergency Shipbuilding Program. At the height of its operation in the Second World War, the Sun campus was the largest shipyard in the world, employing some 40,000 workers.

The company was also part of the U.S. aerospace industry during the Cold War; it built various propulsion research & development structures, including the largest U.S. rocket test chamber, for Aerojet General in 1963.

== History ==
The company was developed in 1916 by Sun Oil Company under the leadership of J. Howard Pew and the Pew family, with a view to producing tankers for the delivery of petroleum products from the Sun Texas wells to their refinery at Marcus Hook, Pennsylvania. The company launched its first ship, Chester Sun, an oil tanker on 30 October 1917, just a few months after the United States entered World War I. The launching took place off the banks of the Delaware River in heavy rainfall as it was felt that delaying the launch would bring bad luck to the ship and yard.

By the end of World War I in 1918, the shipyard had increased significantly, with some 16,000 workers employed on the site and with hundreds of ships built or in the process of being built. Under the direction of its president, John Glenn Pew, the company experienced tremendous success over the following decades. In the 1920s, it had become a large shipyard that built tankers for the Standard Oil Company. In 1936, the Pew family offered John J. McClure and his Republican political machine control over hiring at Sun Shipbuilding as patronage to lure him out of retirement after the scandal involving the Rum Ring Trial.

By the start of World War II, Sun was the largest among the country's five largest shipyards, with eight slipways. Twenty slipways were added during the war, making Sun Ship the country's largest shipyard. At its peak, the company employed more than 40,000 workers at four shipyards. During World War II, Sun Shipbuilding was the largest private-sector employer of African-Americans in the United States and controversially segregated many of the black workers to yard #4. Sun Shipbuilding built 281 T2 tankers during World War II, about 40% of the U.S. wartime total. It also built hospital ships, cargo ships, and escort carriers for the United States Maritime Commission (MARCOM). On 27 September 1941, it contributed one of the 14 ships launched on Liberty Fleet Day: SS Surprise. Sun Shipbuilding originally had a contract to build 30 of the C4 ships. MARCOM prioritized Sun's expertise in building urgently needed T2-SE-A1 tankers and withdrew 20 C4s from Sun and assigned them to Kaiser's Richmond, California yard. The Sun ships, designated C4-S-B2, became War Shipping Administration troopships operated by commercial agents or Navy hospital ships. The yard was also notable for its refinement of the all-welded ship during the war. In 1944 alone, Sun shipyard launched 75 ships. By 1945, 40% of the US tanker fleet had been built there.

Sun continued as a merchant shipbuilder after the war, but sold the South and #4 Yards for industrial development.

In the 1970s, Sun built ten roll-on/roll-off (ro/ro) ships (Ponce de Leon Class) for various operators. One of them, sailing under the name SS El Faro, was lost in a hurricane on October 1, 2015, while steaming from Jacksonville, Florida, to San Juan, Puerto Rico.

On 4 November 1972, Sun launched the Glomar Explorer, designed and built under a cover story concerning deep-sea resource extraction but in reality for the CIA to raise a sunken Soviet submarine lost in 1968 in the Pacific. The ship's construction required a purpose-built crane ship, Sun 800, to lift its 630-ton gimbal into place.

=== Pennsylvania Shipbuilding Company ===
The company was sold to Pennsylvania Shipbuilding in 1982, and closed in 1989. The last ship launched from the yard was the John B. Waterman (hull number 679), a Roll-on/roll-off vessel although it was delivered later under Pennsylvania Shipbuilding's ownership.

The Central Yard site has been sold or leased for multiple uses, while the North Yard is now an independent cargo terminal.

=== Harrah's Philadelphia ===
In 2006, a new casino then named "Harrah's Chester" opened on the Sun Ship site and after a rename in May 2012 it is currently in operation as the casino, entertainment and race track complex "Harrah's Philadelphia".

== Legacy ==
The yard resulted in instances of long-term pollution, primarily as a result of the common practice of using asbestos in shipbuilding in the mid 20th century, leading to instances of workers with asbestosis.

== See also ==
Category: Ships built by the Sun Shipbuilding & Drydock Company
