= Sachem (disambiguation) =

Sachem is a title given to a Algonquian leaders.

Sachem may also refer to:

- Butterflies in the genus Atalopedes:
  - Atalopedes campestris, also known as the sachem
  - Atalopedes huron, also known as the huron sachem
- Sachem - novel written by Henryk Sienkiewicz
- The Sachem, a Canadian newspaper
- The Sachems, a secret society at Columbia University
- SS Sachem, ships with the name
- USS Sachem, US Navy vessels with the name
- A leader of Tammany Hall

== See also ==
- Sachem Award, Indiana's highest civilian honor
- Sachem School District in Long Island, New York, United States
