= Chiwawa-class oiler =

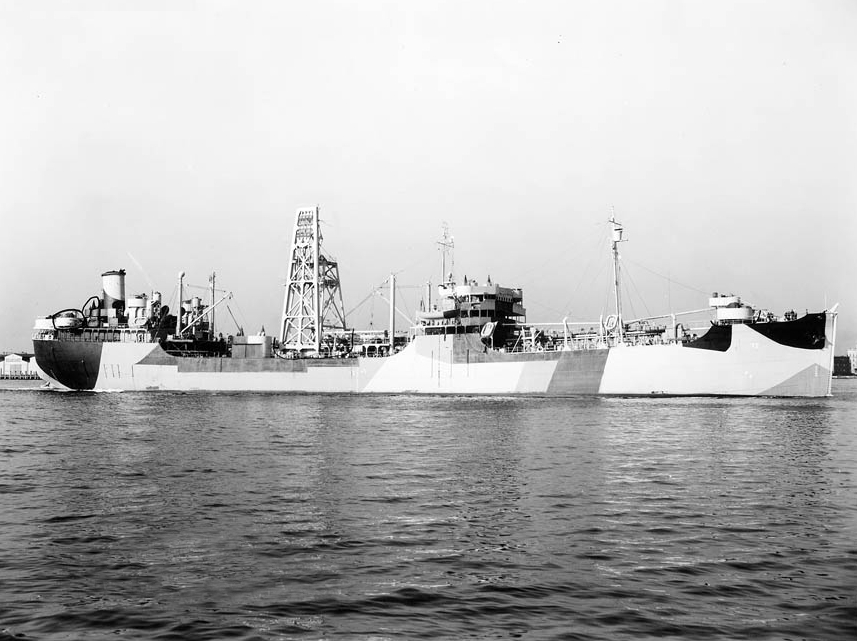
- USS Niobrara AO-72

Class overview
- Name: Chiwawa
- Builders: Bethlehem Sparrows Point Shipyard; Sparrows Point, Maryland
- In commission: 24 December 1942 - 12 November 1957
- Completed: 5
- Active: 2 in commercial service as lake freighters
- Lost: 1

General characteristics
- Class & type: Chiwawa class oiler
- Type: MARAD T3-S-A1
- Tonnage: 16,543 DWT
- Displacement: 21,077 tons
- Length: 501 ft 7.75 in (152.9 m)
- Beam: 68 ft (20.7 m)
- Draft: 29 ft 10.5 in (9.1 m)
- Depth: 37 ft (11.3 m)
- Installed power: 7,000 shp (5,200 kW)
- Propulsion: geared steam turbine; single screw
- Speed: 15.3 knots (28.3 km/h)
- Range: 14,500 nmi (26,900 km; 16,700 mi)
- Capacity: 133,800 bbl (~18,250 t)
- Complement: 214–247
- Sensors & processing systems: 1 × SC radar
- Armament: 1 × 5"/38 caliber gun mounts; 4 × 3"/50 caliber gun mounts; 8 × 40 mm AA gun mounts; 8 × 20 mm AA gun mounts; 2 × depth charge projectors

The Chiwawa-class oilers were United States Navy T3 Tanker oilers of the T3-S-A1 design built during World War II at Bethlehem Sparrows Point Shipyard of Sparrows Point, Maryland. The class consisted of five ships, all of which survived the war.

All of the ships of the class initially were to be built for private companies, but the outset of World War II, the ships were transferred to the United States Maritime Commission and given new names. Later, when allocated to the U.S. Navy, they were renamed again.

Often the Chiwawa class is seen as part of the Kennebec class. In some cases the Kennebec class is divided into three classes, the Kennebec class (AO-36 to AO-40, AO-48), the Mattaponi class (AO-41 to AO-44, AO-47) and the Chiwawa class. The first two classes were of the T2 and T2-A designs whereas the Chiwawas were of the T3-S-A1 design, mainly differing in having only a 7,000 shp engine and a top speed of 15.3 knots.

Three of the ships — Chiwawa (AO-68), Escalante (AO-70), and Neshanic (AO-71) — were decommissioned at the end of the war. The remaining two — Enoree (AO-69) and Niobrara (AO-72) — were in and out of commission until late 1957. Chiwawa (now Lee A. Tregurtha) is still in commercial service on the Great Lakes. Neshanic sailed under various names—the last being the American Victory—through 2008 before being scrapped in 2018. Enoree and Niobrara were both eventually scrapped while Escalante, then known as George MacDonald, sank in 1960.

== Ships of the class ==
Construction data
| Name | Hull no. | Original name | Commissioned | Final decommission | Fate |
|---|---|---|---|---|---|
| Chiwawa | AO-68 | Samoset | 24 December 1942 | 6 May 1946 | converted to laker, 1961; still in service |
| Enoree | AO-69 | Sachem | 23 January 1943 | 22 October 1957 | scrapped, 1982 |
| Escalante | AO-70 | Shabonee | 30 January 1943 | 12 December 1945 | sunk, 1960 |
| Neshanic | AO-71 | Marquette | 13 March 1943 | 19 December 1945 | converted to laker; Scrapped in Turkey, December 2018 |
| Niobrara | AO-72 | Citadel | 20 February 1943 | 12 November 1957 | Scrapped after 1982 |
