= SS Shabonee =

SS Shabonee may refer to one of two Type T3-S-A1 tankers built for the United States Maritime Commission by Bethlehem Sparrows Point Shipyard:

- SS Shabonee (1942) (MC hull number 518), became USS Escalante (AO-70); sold for commercial use in 1947 as SS George MacDonald; exploded and sank in June 1960
- SS Shabonee (1943) (MC hull number 524), scrapped in 1965
