= SC radar =

Radar of the United States Navy

SC (radar)
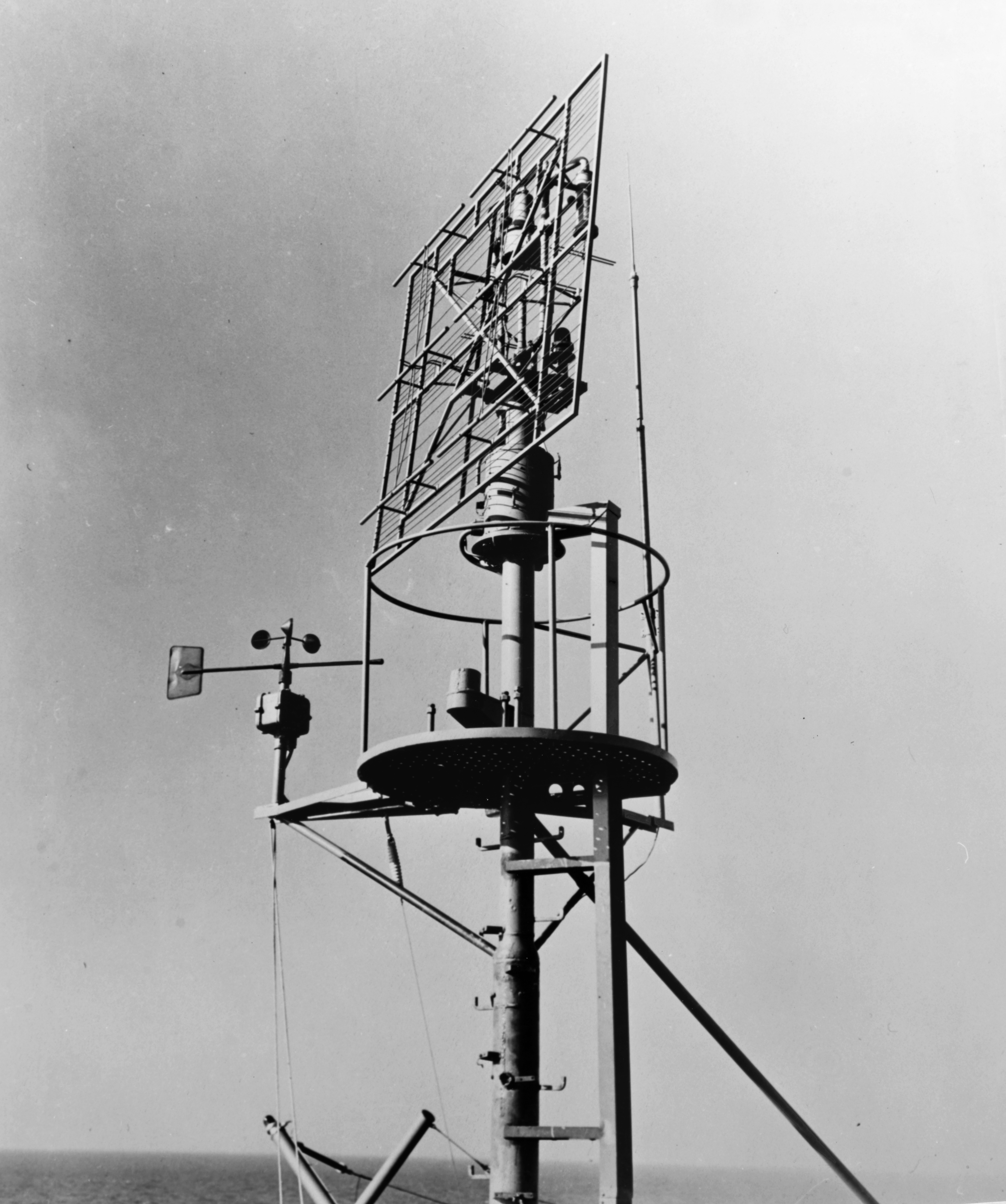
- SC-1 aboard USS Long Island
- Country of origin: United States
- Manufacturer: General Electric
- Introduced: 1942
- Type: Air/Surface-search radar
- Frequency: VHF band
- PRF: 60 Hz
- Beamwidth: 10–25°
- Pulsewidth: 4–5 μs
- Range: 48–120 km (30–75 mi)
- Precision: 90–180 m (98–197 yd)
- Power: 220 kW

SC was an American-made air and surface-search radar used during World War II by the United States Navy. Variations include SC-1, SC-2 and SC-3.

== Overview ==
They were very high frequency search sets, installed on destroyers and larger ships to search for planes and surface vessels and for control of interception. All sets have an "A" scope, provision for Identification friend or foe (IFF) connections, and work with a gyro-compass repeater. SC-2 and SC-3 also have PPI scopes, remote PPI's, and built-in BL and BI*antennas.

With antennas at 100', SC and SC-1 (without preamplifier) have a reliable maximum range of 30 miles on medium bombers at 1,000' altitude. With preamplifier, SC-1's range is extended to 75 miles – the same as that of SC-2 and SC-3. Range accuracy of SC is ± 200 yards; later models have an accuracy of ± 100 yds. bearing accuracy of SC and SC-21 is ± 5°; of SC-2 and SC-3, ± 3°. There is no elevation control on any of the sets, but height can be estimated roughly from positions of minimum signal strength.

Shipment includes spares for each set. If separate generator is needed, it is included in shipment. Not air transportable.

Both SC and SC-1 have 5 components weighing a total of 1800 lbs. SC-2 has 6 components weighing a total of 3,000 pounds. Weights and dimensions of antenna assemblies are 450 lbs. 6'11-1/2" x 8'6" for SC and SC-1; 478 lbs. 4'6" x 15' for SC-2 and SC-3. Antennas should be mounted as high as possible, preferably 100 feet or more, above other superstructures.

One operator per shift is minimum on all 3 sets. SC and SC-1 require primary power of 1500 watts at 115 volts, 60 cycles. SC-2 and SC-3 require 2500 watts at 115 volts, 60 cycles. All sets use ship's power of 115 volts, 60 cycles; transformer, if ship's power is 440 volts AC or 220 volts AC; motor generator if ship's power is DC.

== On board ships ==
=== United States ===
- Essex-class aircraft carrier
- Independence-class aircraft carrier
- Yorktown-class aircraft carrier
- Avenger-class escort carrier
- Casablanca-class escort carrier
- Long Island-class escort carrier
- Iowa-class battleship
- South Dakota-class battleship
- Colorado-class battleship
- USS Tennessee (BB-43)
- New York-class battleship
- USS Arkansas (BB-33)
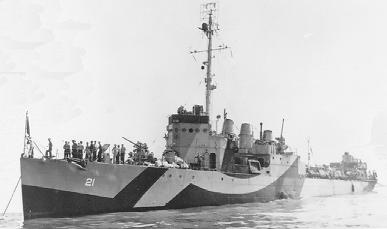
  SC-1 aboard USS Sicard
- Gearing-class destroyer
- Allen M. Sumner-class destroyer
- Fletcher-class destroyer
- Gleaves-class destroyer
- Benson-class destroyer
- Sims-class destroyer
- Benham-class destroyer
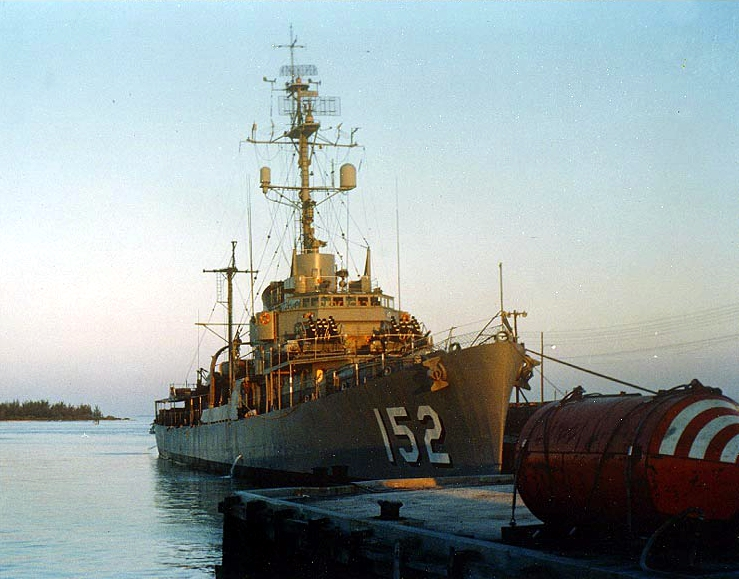
- SC-3 aboard USS Peterson
  Somers-class destroyer
- Bagley-class destroyer
- Porter-class destroyer
- Mahan-class destroyer
- Farragut-class destroyer
- Wickes-class destroyer
- Sampson-class destroyer
- John C. Butler-class destroyer escort
- Rudderow-class destroyer escort
- Buckley-class destroyer escort
- Edsall-class destroyer escort
- Chiwawa-class oiler
- Kennebec-class oiler
- Patapsco-class gasoline tanker

=== Australia ===
- River-class frigate

== Gallery ==
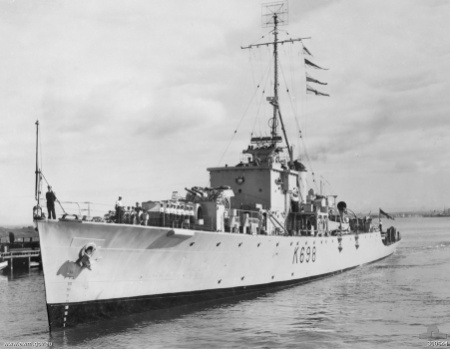
SC-1 aboard HMAS Condamine

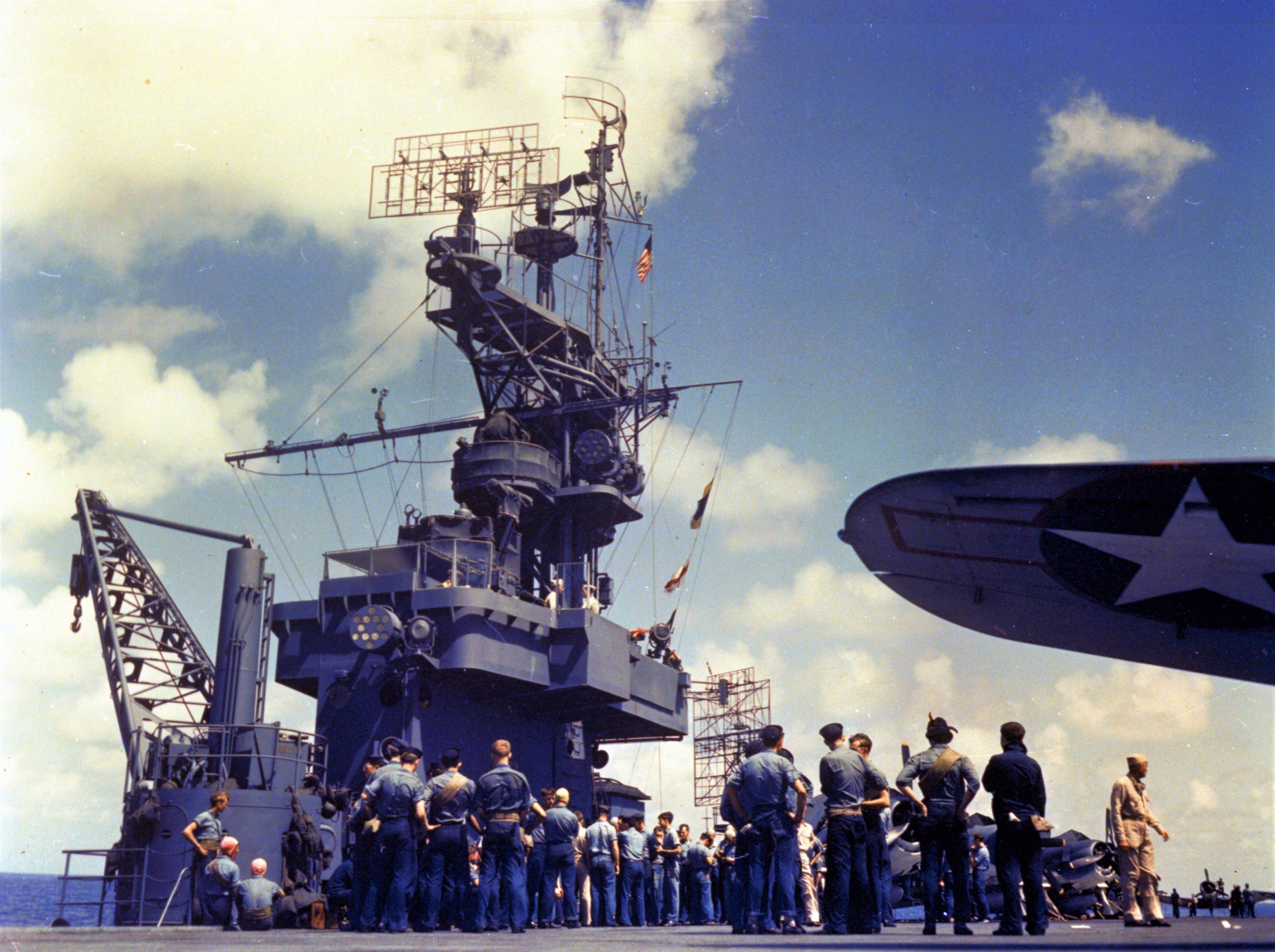
SC-2 aboard USS Cowpens

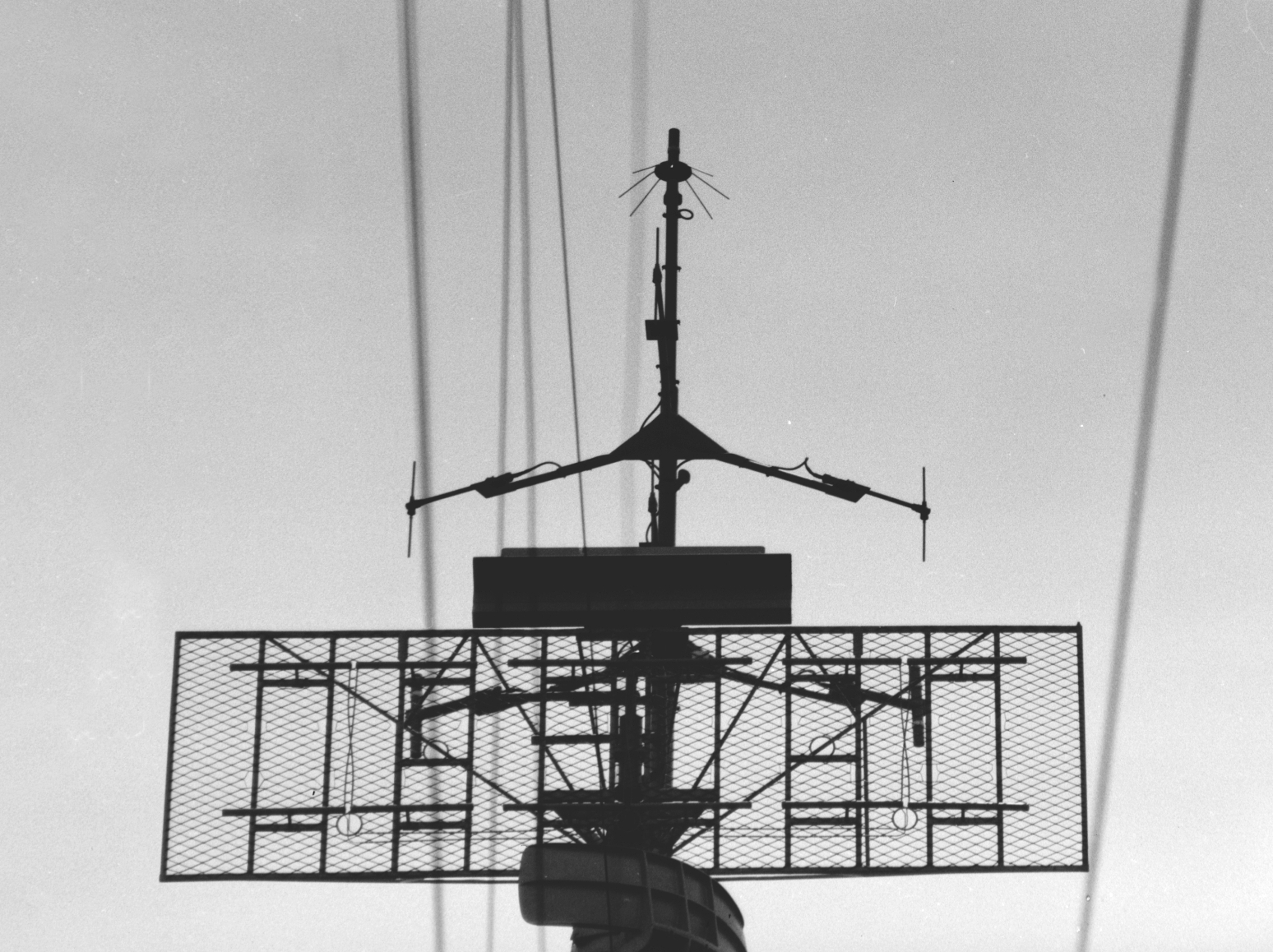
SC-3 aboard USS Niobrara

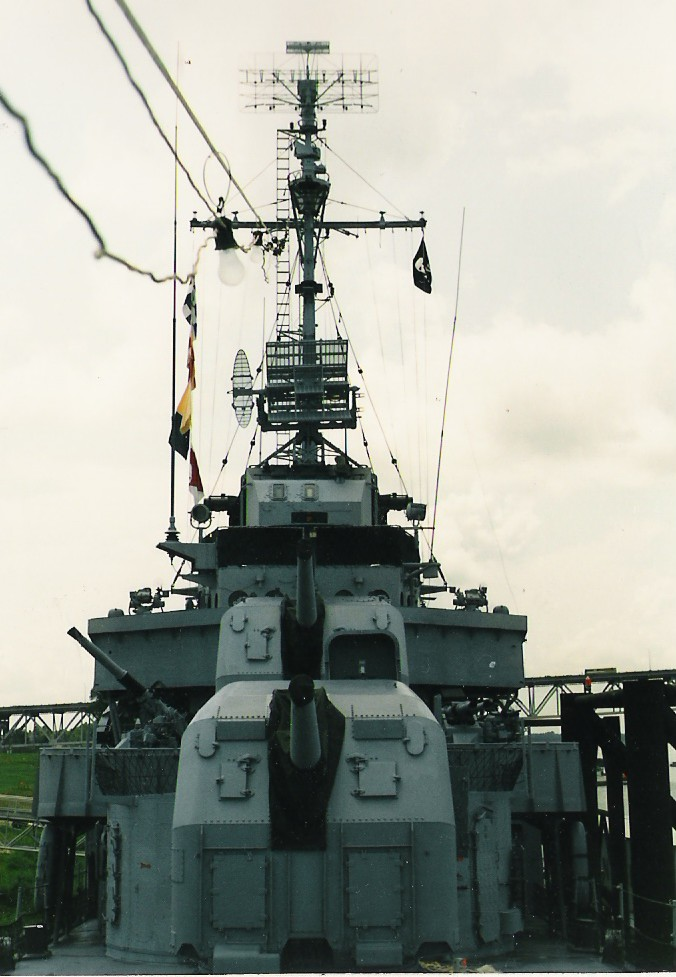
SC-3 aboard USS Kidd

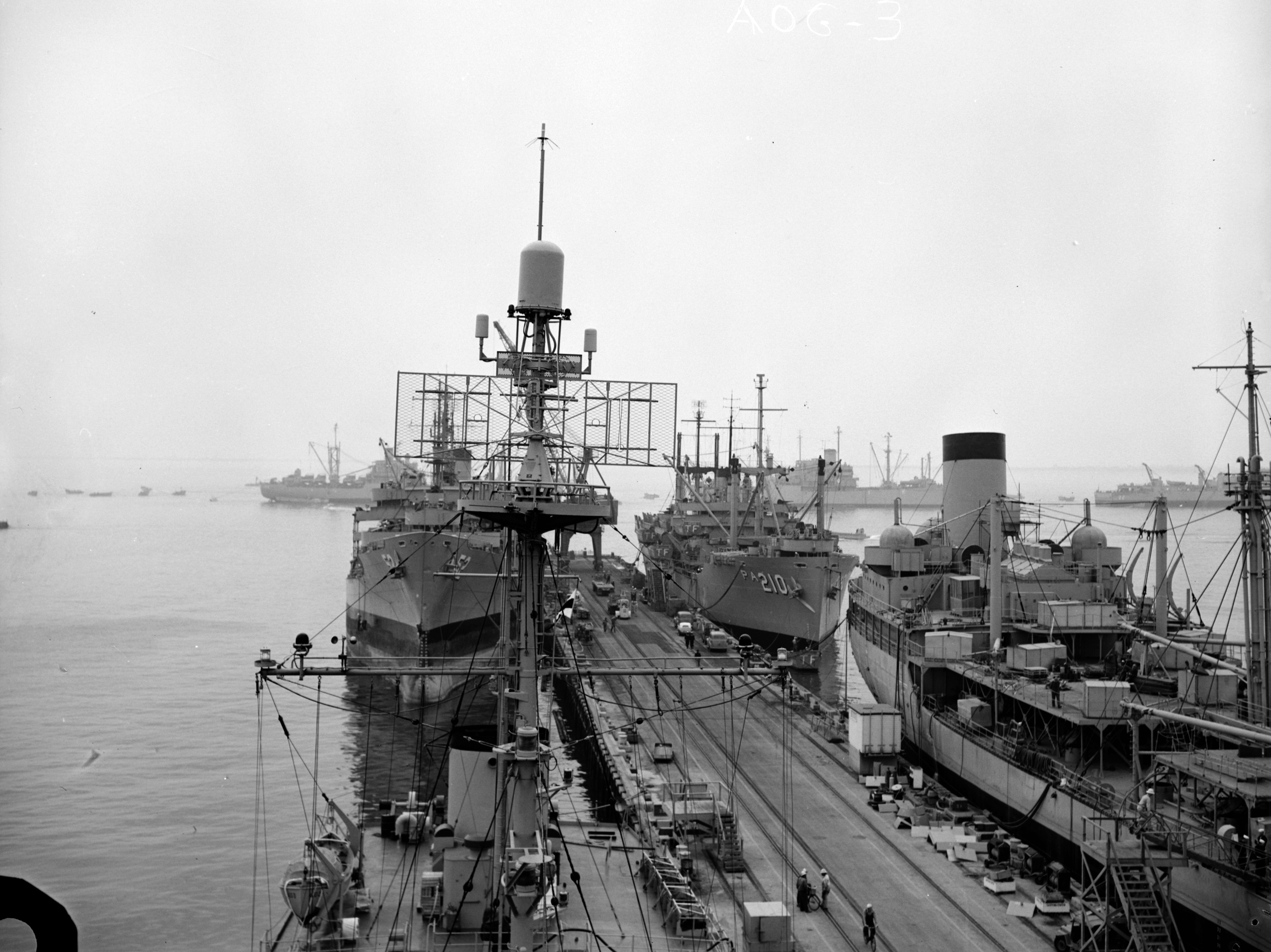
SC-3 aboard USS Rio Grande

== See also ==
- List of radars
- Radar configurations and types
- Surveillance radar
