= Enoree =

Enoree may refer to:

- Enoree, South Carolina, a Census-designated place in Spartanburg County in South Carolina in the United States
- The Enoree River in South Carolina in the United States
- USS Enoree (AO-69), a United States Navy oiler in commission from 1943 to 1947, from 1950 to 1954, and from 1956 to 1957
