= SS Sachem =

SS Sachem may refer to one of two Type T3-S-A1 tankers built for the United States Maritime Commission by Bethlehem Sparrows Point Shipyard:

- SS Sachem (1942) (MC hull number 517), became USS Enoree (AO-69); placed in National Defense Reserve Fleet in 1958; scrapped in 1976
- SS Sachem (1943) (MC hull number 523), scrapped in 1964

or to:

- SS Sachem (1893), passenger ship built by Harland and Wolff for Geo Warren & Co and completed on 28 October 1893
