= USS Enoree =

Oiler of the United States Navy

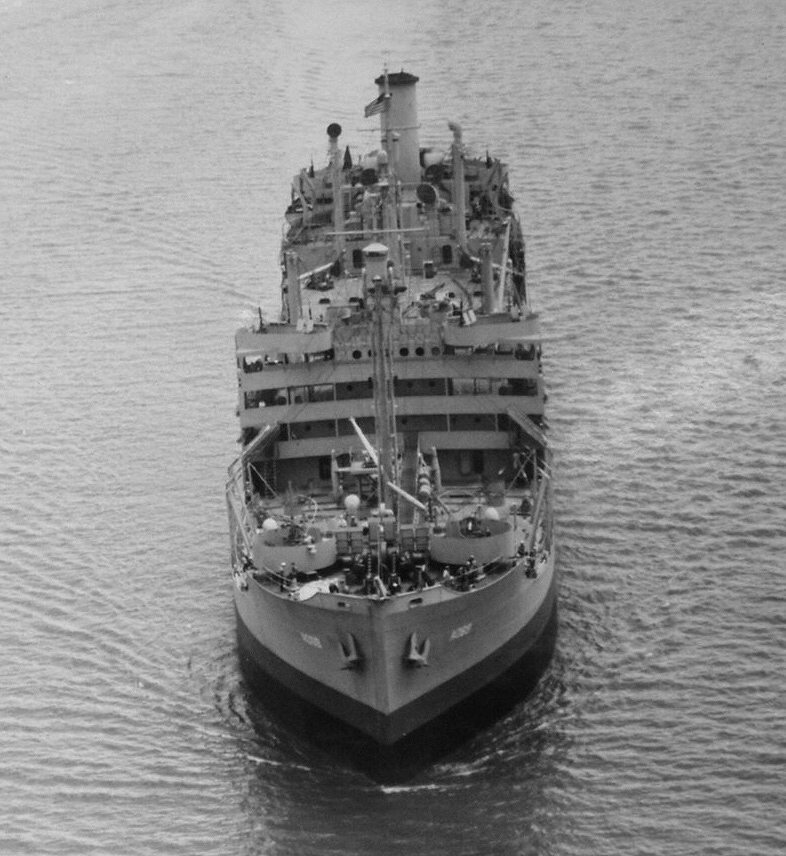
- Aerial view of USS Enoree (AO-69) near Norfolk, Virginia, on 17 May 1943

History

United States
- Name: USS Enoree
- Namesake: The Enoree River in South Carolina
- Ordered: as T3-S-A1 tanker hull; MC hull 517
- Builder: Bethlehem Steel Company, Sparrows Point, Maryland.
- Laid down: as SS Sachem
- Launched: 29 August 1942
- Acquired: 23 January 1943
- Commissioned: as USS Enoree (AO-69), 23 January 1943
- Decommissioned: 27 March 1947
- Recommissioned: 18 October 1950
- Decommissioned: 10 December 1954
- Recommissioned: 10 December 1956
- Decommissioned: 22 October 1957
- Stricken: 1 February 1959
- Identification: Call Sign: Nan Zebra King Charley
- Honors and awards: Five battle stars for World War II
- Fate: Sold for scrapping 27 April 1976

General characteristics
- Class & type: Chiwawa-class oiler
- Type: MARAD T3-S-A1
- Tonnage: 16,543 DWT
- Displacement: 21,077 tons
- Length: 501 ft 7.75 in (152.9017 m)
- Beam: 68 ft (21 m)
- Draft: 29 ft 10.5 in (9.106 m)
- Depth: 37 ft (11 m)
- Installed power: 7,000 shp (5,200 kW)
- Propulsion: geared steam turbine; single screw
- Speed: 15.3 knots (28.3 km/h)
- Range: 14,500 nmi (26,900 km; 16,700 mi)
- Capacity: 133,800 bbl (~18,250 t)
- Complement: 13 officers 200 enlisted
- Armament: 1 × 5"/38 dual purpose gun mount; 4 × 3 in (76 mm) guns, 4 × twin 40 mm gun mounts; 4 × twin 20 mm gun mounts

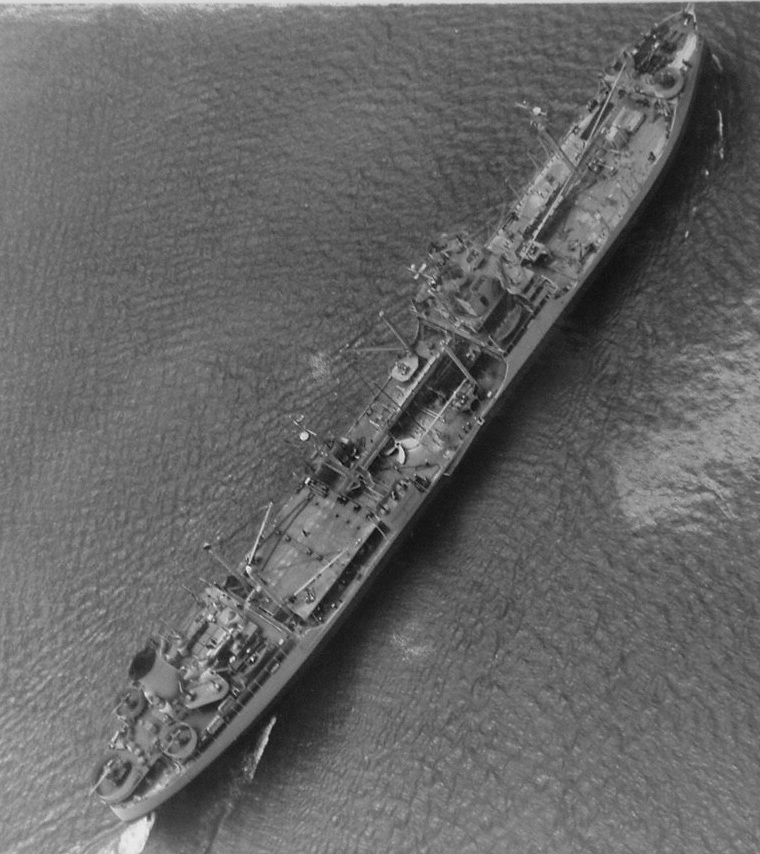
Aerial view of USS Enoree (AO-69) near Norfolk, Virginia, on 17 May 1943.

USS Enoree (AO-69) was a Chiwawa-class oiler constructed for the United States Navy during World War II. She was the only U.S. Navy ship named for the Enoree River in South Carolina.

== Construction and commissioning ==
The tanker SS Sachem – T3 laid down under a Maritime Commission contract (MC Hull No. 517) on 8 April 1942 at Sparrows Point, Maryland, by the Bethlehem Steel Company and launched on 29 August 1942 – was renamed SS Enoree and designated as a fuel oil tanker (AO-69) on 17 September 1942. Acquired by the U.S. Navy on 23 January 1943, Enoree was commissioned the same day.

== Service history ==
=== World War II ===
Departing Baltimore, Maryland, on 27 January 1943 for Norfolk, Virginia, her conversion having been completed the previous day, Enoree proceeded thence to Tompkinsville, Staten Island, New York, arriving on 3 March 1943, where she was involved in a minor collision with the U.S. Navy oiler USS Sapelo. While Enoree suffered no damage in the mishap, Sapelo required minor repairs. Shifting thence to the waters off Ambrose Light, Enoree, escorted by the destroyer Niblack departed on 8 March 1943 for Hampton Roads, Virginia, arriving the following day. Her loading delayed, however, she returned to New York City, arriving on 17 March 1943. She ultimately sailed on her maiden transatlantic run on 1 April 1943, departing the United States East Coast with Task Force 69 as it escorted convoy UGS-7, and arriving at its destination, Casablanca, French North Africa, on 19 April 1943. Enoree returned to the United States, via Gibraltar (which she visited on 22–23 April 1943), with convoy GUS-6A, reaching Norfolk on 10 May 1943.

Enoree shuttled between Norfolk, Aruba in the Netherlands West Indies, and Port Arthur Texas, for the balance of May and through mid-June 1943 before she departed Hampton Roads with Task Force 62, the escort for convoy UGS-11, on 27 June 1943, bound, once more, for Casablanca, which she reached on 18 July. Sailing for home with convoy GUS-10 on 23 July 1943, she paused briefly at Bermuda, shepherded by the destroyer escorts USS Pope and Walter S. Brown, ultimately arriving back in Hampton Roads on 11 August 1943. Subsequently, she made her third voyage to Casablanca, that time with Task Force 61 as it escorted UGS-16, arriving at its destination on 13 September 1943, and returning home with GUS-15.

Putting into New York City with that section of GUS-15 on 4 October 1943, Enoree then made her first voyage to Belfast, Northern Ireland, with Task Force 69 as it escorted troop convoy UT-4, departing the East Coast of the United States on 21 October 1943 and reaching its destination on 31 October 1943. Returning to New York City on 18 November 1943, she dropped down the coast to Norfolk, arriving there on 23 November 1943 with the New York section of convoy UGS-25. She then shuttled between Norfolk, Houston, Texas, and Port Arthur into the second week of January 1944. Ultimately, she returned to New York City on 22 January 1944 and there joined Task Force 60, the escort force for the troop convoy UT-8, sailing for the United Kingdom on 12 February 1944. Three days later, during the passage, Enoree topped off the escort force's destroyers.

Returning to New York City from Belfast on 9 March 1944, Enoree departed that port on 11 March with the New York section of UGS-36 and reached Norfolk on 12 March. Less than a fortnight later, on 26 March 1944, she was earmarked for future assignment to Service Squadron Eight, United States Pacific Fleet. Enoree remained at Norfolk into late April 1944, and received an overhaul during that time, the work being completed on 15 April 1944. Plans for her conversion to a crane vessel having been contemplated since at least early December 1943, she was the recipient of a 160-ton capacity crane during that period of yard work. Enoree departed Norfolk on 25 April 1944 with the similarly derrick-configured oiler Niobrara, escorted by the destroyer USS Paul Hamilton. Pausing briefly at Aruba from 30 April to 1 May 1944, Enoree pushed on for the Panama Canal Zone, which she reached on 3 May 1944. After transiting the Panama Canal, she cleared Balboa and reported for duty with the Pacific Fleet on 5 May 1944, bound for Oahu, Territory of Hawaii.

Arriving at Pearl Harbor on 19 May 1944, Enoree sailed in convoy for the Marshall Islands on 27 May 1944. Arriving at Eniwetok on 5 June 1944, the ship dispensed fuel oil and ammunition to ships present on a daily basis over the next twelve days. Departing Eniwetok on 17 June 1944 with Task Unit 16.7.6, Enoree conducted fueling operations at sea subsequently. Detached from Task Group 60.17 upon completion of those services, she returned to Eniwetok, escorted by the destroyer escort USS Parks (DE-165), dropping anchor on 1 July 1944. Enoree based out of Eniwetok over the next three months, proceeding to sea at intervals to conduct logistical work as required, those and the previous evolutions in support of the unfolding campaign to secure the Mariana Islands, and, subsequently, the western Caroline Islands.

Enoree shifted her base of operations to Ulithi, in the recently secured western Carolines, sailing from Eniwetok on 8 October 1944 and arriving at her destination on 13 October 1944. From Ulithi, she supported the United States Third Fleet (under Admiral William F. Halsey, Jr.) as it carried out its devastating attacks against Formosa, the coast of China, and in the Nansei Shoto group during January 1945. Ultimately departing the western Carolines on 7 February 1945, she reached Saipan, in the Marianas, two days later. She remained there until 30 March 1945, when she got underway to return to Ulithi, arriving on 1 April 1945 as operations began against Okinawa in the Ryukyu Islands.

With the establishment of a logistics base at Kerama Retto, Enoree sailed for that place on 3 April 1945, taking up her duties there a week later, on 10 April. Departing Kerama Retto three days later, Enoree returned to Ulithi on 20 April 1945, where she remained until 24 May 1945. Joining Task Unit 30.18.11 on 31 May 1945, Enoree discharged fuel oil, aviation gasoline, and some of her crew to the mobile storage tanker USS Marmora for transportation. Arriving at Okinawa on 1 June 1945, she got underway the following day for the fueling rendezvous off Hagushi beach, fueled a convoy underway, and then returned whence she had come. Departing Okinawa on 5 June 1945, she returned to Ulithi to load a cargo of oil, arriving on 11 June 1945. She shuttled to Kerama Retto and back into mid-July 1945. After having loaded a cargo of fuel oil from the merchant tanker SS Skullbar, Enoree sailed from Ulithi on 19 July 1945 for Okinawa in convoy UOK-39, and resumed operations in Buckner Bay soon thereafter. In addition to her regular fueling duties, the large cruiser USS Guam being one of her customers, Enoree, with her heavy-lift capacity, easily unloaded five 27-ton (24.1-long ton; 24.5-metric ton) pontoon barges for the medium landing ship USS LSM-329 on 26 July 1945, and on 5 August 1945, lifted the 105-ton (94-long ton; 95-metric ton) tank landing craft USS LCT-591 from the deck of the tank landing ship USS LST-534.

Enoree departed Okinawa on 6 August 1945 with convoy OKU-17, arriving at Ulithi on 10 August, only to put to sea again, Okinawa-bound with convoy UOK-48 on 14 August, the day before Japan accepted the provisions of the Potsdam Declaration and agreed to surrender.

=== Postwar ===
The cessation of hostilities and the occupation of the Japanese homeland required Enoree’s presence in the Pacific and cancelled her projected 15 July-1 September 1945 overhaul at San Pedro, California. Enoree thus shuttled back and forth between Okinawa and Ulithi into the autumn of 1945, departing Buckner Bay on 5 October 1945 for Japanese waters to support the occupation. Enoree then operated out of Kure, Hiro Wan, Yokohama, Yokosuka, Sasebo, and Wakayama. Departing Wakayama on 19 December 1945, Enoree arrived off Okinawa on 23 December 1945. She remained there until sailing for Guam, in the Marianas, on 18 March 1946. Proceeding thence via Manila, Philippine Islands, and a brief six-hour liberty call at Singapore, Straits Settlements, Enoree ultimately reached Bahrain, in the Persian Gulf, to load a cargo of fuel, on 15 May 1946. Sailing for Manila on 17 May, she called at Ceylon from 24 to 26 May 1946 en route, and arrived in Philippine waters on 3 June 1946.

Assigned to the Repair and Service Unit (Task Unit 1.8.1) of Joint Task Force 1, for Operation Crossroads, the atomic bomb tests at Bikini Atoll, Enoree departed Manila on 4 June 1946, and arrived at Bikini on 13 June 1946. She provided fuel for the other units assigned to the work there for the next two weeks before shifting to Kwajalein on 29 June 1946. During Test Able, on 1 July 1946, she lay at Kwajalein, about 155 nautical miles (287 km; 178 mi) southeast of Bikini, and because of the favorable weather conditions and the relatively small size of the bomb, received no contamination from the atomic blast. Underway on 3 July 1946, Enoree returned to Bikini the following day, and remained anchored there until the second dog watch on 13 July 1946, when she again got underway to return to Kwajalein. Reaching her destination the following afternoon, she replenished her fuel supplies there and then set course for Bikini on the 16th, arriving the following morning. Between 20 and 23 July 1946, she supplied oil to various units of the task force. Underway late in the afternoon watch on 24 July 1946, Enoree was underway the following morning (25 July 1946) in company with the destroyer tender USS Dixie (AD-14), and observed Test Baker, the shallow underwater detonation, from a distance in excess of 17 nautical miles (19.5 statute miles; 31.5 km). Enoree ultimately returned to Bikini lagoon during the morning watch on 29 July 1946, and resumed dispensing fuel oil, a vital logistical task that occupied her throughout much of the month of August 1946. She left Bikini for the last time on 24 August 1946, when she sailed for Kwajalein, arriving the next day. A radiological monitoring team boarded the ship on the morning of 28 August 1946, and declared her radiologically safe, clearing her to sail. She was detached from Operation Crossroads on 29 August 1946.

After a brief visit to Eniwetok from 29 August to 3 September 1946, Enoree departed Kwajalein for Pearl Harbor with the barrack ship USS APL-30 in tow on 7 September 1946, delivering her charge upon arrival on 20 September. Departing Pearl Harbor a week later on 27 September 1946, Enorree reached San Francisco, California, her decontamination port, on 4 October 1946. Assigned a restricted availability commencing 14 November 1946 at Mare Island Naval Shipyard, Vallejo, California. for urgent repairs to her number one boiler, with other work to be performed by the repair ship USS Cebu, Enoree received operational and radiological clearance by 11 December 1946. Departing San Francisco on 22 December 1946, the oiler reached San Diego the following day, where she remained into 1947.

With the floating workshop YR-37 in tow, Enoree departed San Diego on 2 January 1947 bound for the Panama Canal Zone. Transiting the Panama Canal between 13 and 16 January 1947, and reporting for duty with the Service Force, United States Atlantic Fleet, the oiler dropped off YR-37 at Charleston, South Carolina, on 26 January 1947. Pushing on the same day for Norfolk, the ship paused briefly at that port on 28–29 January 1947 before departing for her ultimate destination, the Philadelphia Naval Shipyard, Philadelphia, Pennsylvania, which she reached on 30 January 1947 to begin preparations to join the inactive reserve fleet. Placed out of commission, in reserve, on 27 May 1947, with preservation 37% completed, Enoree was formally inactivated on 23 June 1947.

=== Cold War ===
Ordered activated on 7 August 1950, Enoree, preparations to return her to active service still in progress, was recommissioned at Philadelphia on 18 October 1950. After a visit to Norfolk from 8 November to 14 December 1950, Enoree returned to Philadelphia on the latter date and continued fitting out into the new year of 1951. Sailing from her activation yard on 25 January 1951, the ship paused at Norfolk from 26 January to 2 February 1951 before pushing on for the Panama Canal Zone. Transiting the Panama Canal on 9–10 February 1951, Enoree reached Pearl Harbor on 26 February 1951.

Reassigned to the Military Sea Transportation Service (MSTS) on 30 March 1951, she would operate as United States Naval Ship (USNS) Enoree (T-AO-69) for the remainder of her operational service. Having reported to Commander, MSTS, for operational control and Commander, MSTS, Pacific, for administrative control, meanwhile, Enoree departed Pearl Harbor on 31 March 1951 for San Francisco, arriving there on 7 April 1951. Her departure thence delayed until 28 April 1951, the ship sailed for Balboa, Panama Canal Zone, on that date, and retransited the Panama Canal, Aruba-bound, on 8–9 May 1951. Over the remainder of the year 1951, Enoree picked up petroleum cargoes at Aruba; Marcus Hoo, Pennsylvania; Houston; Port Arthur; and Perth Amboy, New Jersey, delivering them to Norfolk; Melville, Rhode Island; Newport, Rhode Island; Savannah, Georgia; Boston, Massachusetts; Guantanamo Bay, Cuba; Roosevelt Roads, Puerto Rico; and Trinidad. She arrived at the New York Naval Shipyard, Brooklyn, New York, on 8 November 1951, where she remained into 1952.

Enoree visited New York City from 10 to 15 January 1952, Leonardo, New Jersey, from 15 to 16 January 1952, and Norfolk from 17 to 28 January 1952 before she returned to the West Indies, and her first visit to Aruba for the year from 2 to 3 February 1952, steaming thence to the Panama Canal Zone. She transited the Panama Canal between 4 and 6 February 1952, departing Balboa on the latter date for Galveston, Texas, which she reached on 10 February 1952. Remaining there until 20 February 1952, Enoree then visited Freeport, Texas, at the mouth of the Brazos River, before she proceeded on to return to the Panama Canal Zone, bound for the United States West Coast. Transiting the Panama Canal on 26–27 February 1952, she reached El Segundo, California, on 8 March 1952. She operated in the El Segundo-Long Beach-San Diego area until 28 March 1952, when she took departure for the Panama Canal Zone, transiting the Panama Canal on 5 April 1952. After shuttling between Aruba and Guantanamo Bay, Enoree loaded a cargo of oil at Aruba and sailed for Norfolk, and thence to the northward, to Thule Air Base, Greenland, which she visited from 30 June to 13 August 1952, and Naval Station Argentia, Newfoundland. Canada, from 30 to 31 August 1952. After a period at New York from 3 to 19 September 1952, the tanker sailed once more for Aruba, and during the autumn of 1952 carried cargoes between Aruba and San Juan, Puerto Rico (twice); Trinidad' Roosevelt Roads; Coco Solo, Panama Canal Zone; and Norfolk. During December 1952, she made two round trips between Aruba and Guantanamo Bay. Ultimately reaching New York on 19 December 1952, Enoree remained there into the second week of March 1953.

During 1953, Enoree voyaged to and from Aruba ten times, Houston five times, and Port Arthur once, calling at Norfolk eleven times, Mayport and Key West, Florida; Melville; New York City; and Cristóbal, Panama Canal Zone, once apiece; the only variation to the usual succession of United States ports was Hvalfjordur, Iceland, from 1 to 4 October 1953. Offloading at Earle, New Jersey on 19 January 1954, Enoree entered the Todd Plant, Erie Basin, yard at Brooklyn, New York, the same day, for overhaul; she remained there until 9 March 1954.

Enoree continued shuttling between oil ports like Aruba, Houston, and Galveston, and locales of fleet activity like Gonaïves, Haiti; San Juan; Melville (twice); Key West; and Norfolk (twice) into the spring of 1954. On 5 May 1954, however, she received word that, effective 11 May 1954, her home yard was to be changed from Norfolk to Long Beach. Departing Norfolk for the last time on 12 May 1954, Enoree transited the Panama Canal between 17 and 19 May 1954 and reached San Francisco on 29 May 1954, where she remained until 5 August 1954. Underway for Long Beach on that date, she reached her destination the next day, and remained there for four months, her inactivity reflecting decreased military shipping requirements. Underway for San Diego on 7 December 1954, she arrived at that port the next day. She was decommissioned and placed in the San Diego group of the Pacific Reserve Fleet on 10 December 1954.

Ordered activated and transferred to MSTS on 6 November 1956, Enoree was recommissioned on 10 December 1956 at Long Beach Naval Shipyard with Commander Richard H. Tibbets . She sailed to begin her third tour of active service on 27 December 1956. Transiting the Panama Canal on 4 January 1957, she reached Aruba three days later. Over the months that followed, Enoree conducted seven voyages from Aruba to Norfolk, three to Guantanamo Bay, one to Jacksonville, Florida, and one to Cristóbal. In addition, she made one deployment to the Mediterranean, departing Aruba on 5 April 1957 and reaching the Bay of Pozzuoli, west of Naples, Italy, on 21 April 1957. Port visits to Amuay, Venezuela, from 11 to 12 June 1957 and New York City from 19 to 21 June and 14 August to 2 September 1957 punctuated those routine voyages in the summer of 1957. Her final visit to New York City occurred between 25 September and 16 October 1957, after which she departed on her final voyage, proceeding via Sabine Pass and Port Arthur, and arriving at Orange, Texas, on 22 October 1957, where she was decommissioned and placed in reserve the same day. She was transferred to Maritime Administration custody at Beaumont, Texas, on 13 November 1957.

== Disposal ==
Stricken from the Naval Vessel Register on 1 February 1959, Enoree remained in the National Defense Reserve Fleet’s Beaumont berthing area until sold for scrapping on 27 April 1976 to Luria Brothers and Company, Inc., of Cleveland, Ohio.

== Honors and awards ==
Enoree received five battle stars for her World War II service in the Pacific Theater of Operations. She was also authorized:

- American Campaign Medal
- European-African-Middle Eastern Campaign Medal (1)
- Asiatic-Pacific Campaign Medal (5)
- World War II Victory Medal
- Navy Occupation Service Medal (with Asia and Europe clasps)
- National Defense Service Medal
- Philippines Presidential Unit Citation
