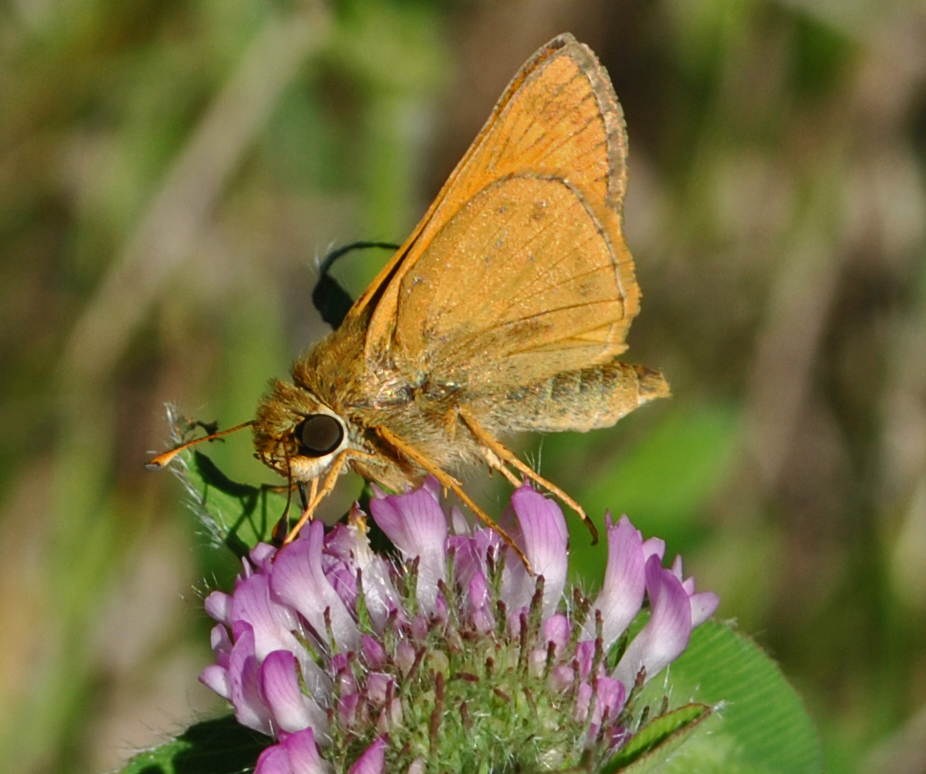
- Atalopedes campestris

Scientific classification
- Kingdom: Animalia
- Phylum: Arthropoda
- Class: Insecta
- Order: Lepidoptera
- Family: Hesperiidae
- Tribe: Hesperiini
- Genus: Atalopedes; Scudder, 1872

Synonyms
- Pansydia Scudder, 1872; Linka Evans, 1955

= Atalopedes =

Genus of butterflies

Atalopedes is a genus of skipper butterflies in the family Hesperiidae.

== Species ==
- The campestris species group
  - Atalopedes campestris (Boisduval, 1852)
  - Atalopedes huron
- The mesogramma species group
  - Atalopedes carteri Evans, 1955
  - Atalopedes mesogramma (Latreille, [1824])
- The clarkei species group
  - Atalopedes bahiensis (Schaus, 1902)
  - Atalopedes flaveola (Mabille, 1891)
- Group name unassigned/unknown:
  - Atalopedes lina (Plötz, 1883)
