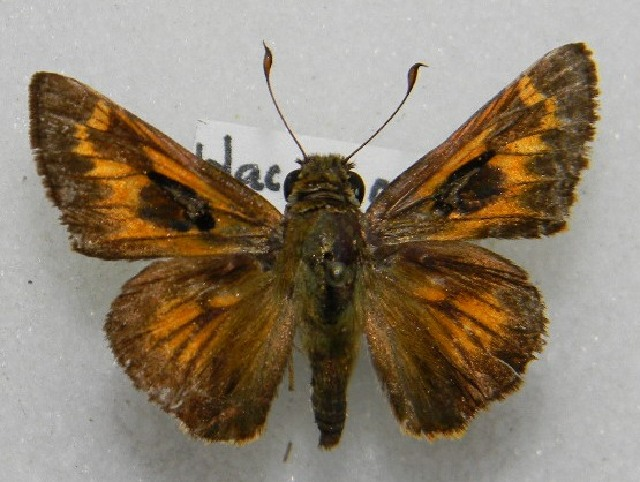

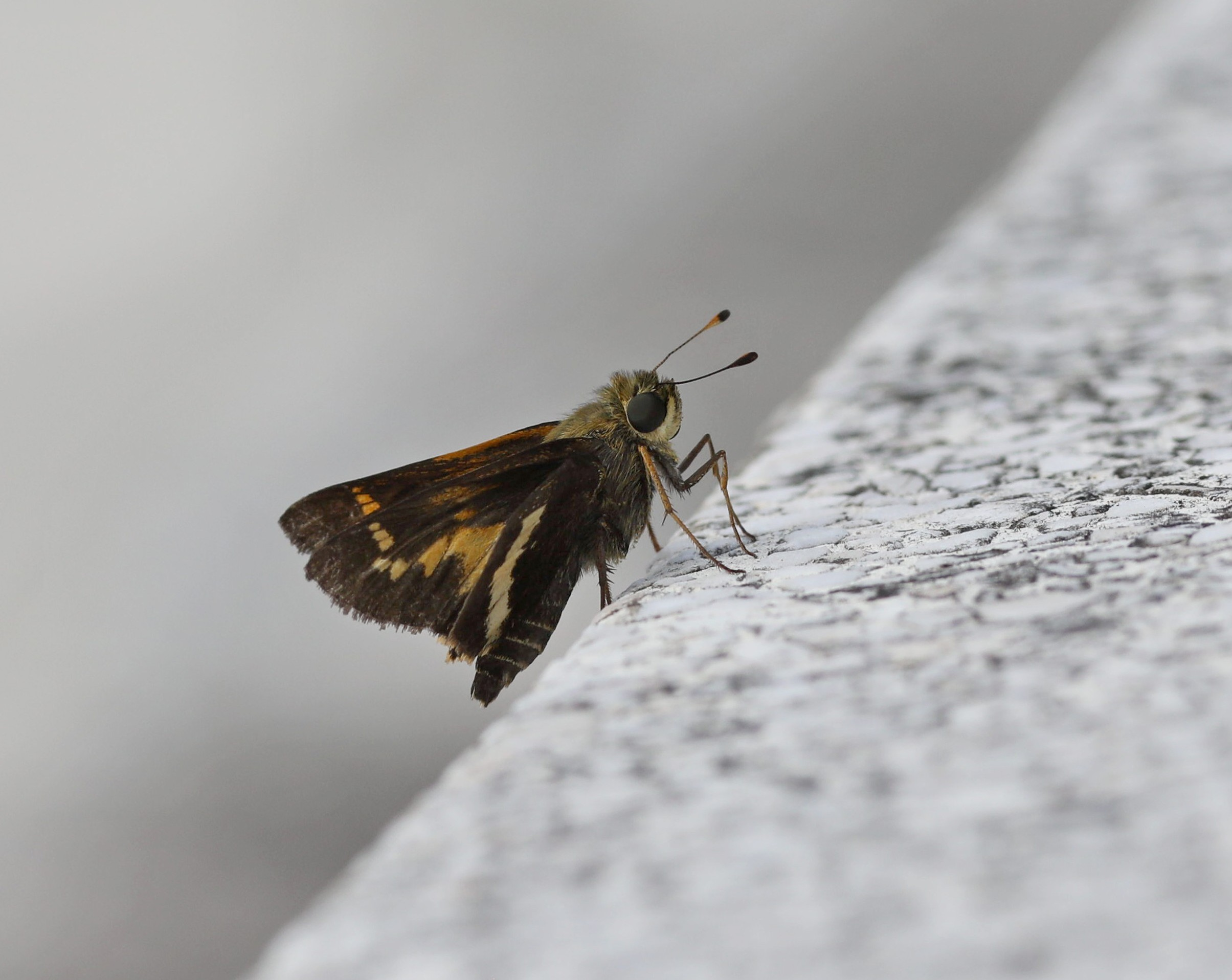

Scientific classification
- Kingdom: Animalia
- Phylum: Arthropoda
- Clade: Pancrustacea
- Class: Insecta
- Order: Lepidoptera
- Family: Hesperiidae
- Genus: Atalopedes
- Species: A. mesogramma

Binomial name
- Atalopedes mesogramma (Latreille, [1824])

Synonyms
- Hesperia mesogramma Latreille, [1824]; Hesperia alameda Lucas, 1857; Hesperia cunaxa Hewitson, [1866]; Goniloba conformis Herrich-Schäffer, 1869; Atalopedes mesogramma apa Comstock, 1944

= Atalopedes mesogramma =

Species of butterfly

Atalopedes mesogramma is a butterfly in the family Hesperiidae. It is found on the Greater Antilles and Cuba.

== Subspecies ==
- Atalopedes mesogramma mesogramma (Cuba)
- Atalopedes mesogramma apa Comstock, 1944 (Puerto Rico)
