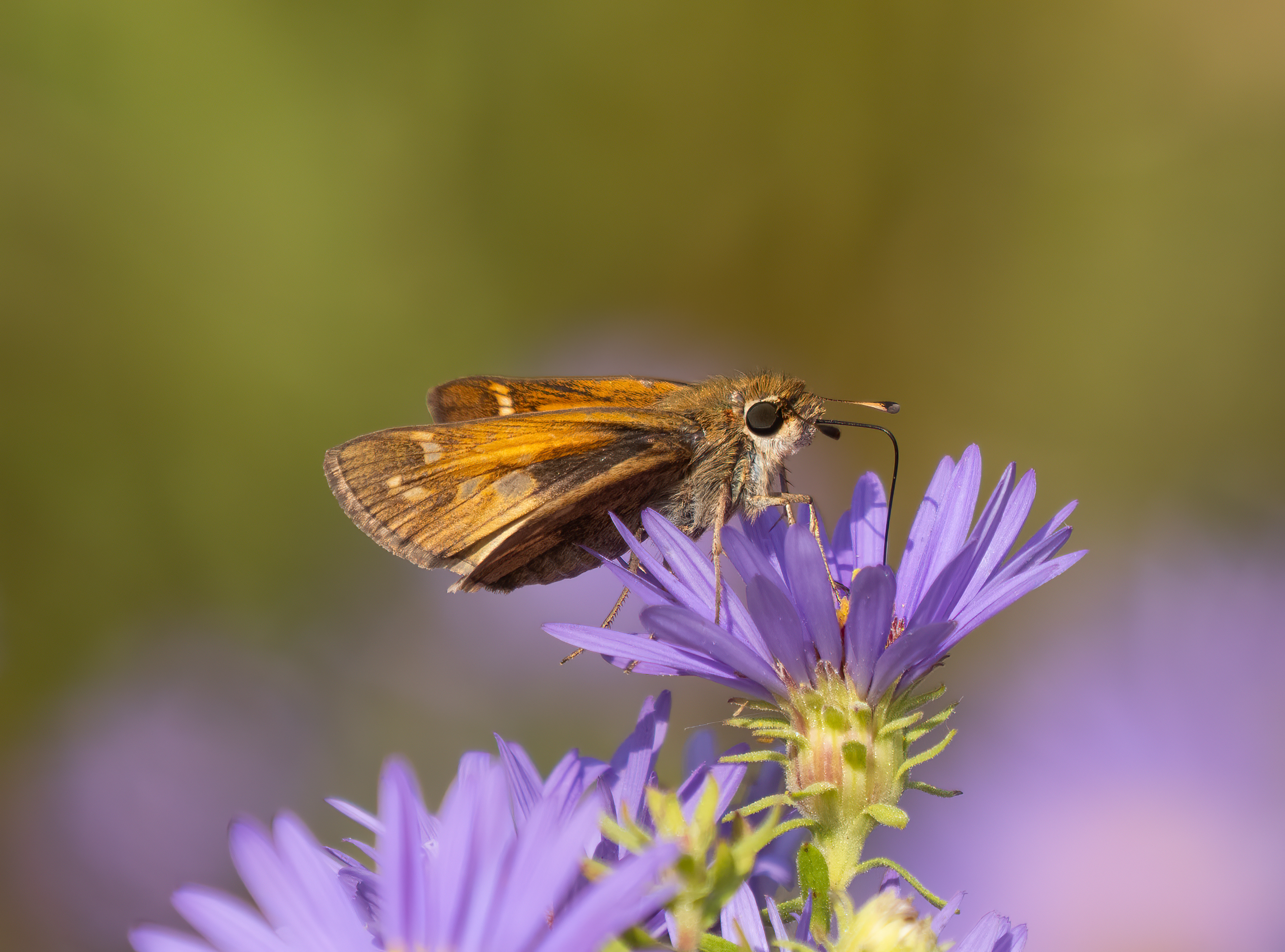
- Female in New York

Scientific classification
- Kingdom: Animalia
- Phylum: Arthropoda
- Clade: Pancrustacea
- Class: Insecta
- Order: Lepidoptera
- Family: Hesperiidae
- Genus: Atalopedes
- Species: A. huron

Binomial name
- Atalopedes huron Edwards, 1863

= Atalopedes huron =

- Male in New York

Species of butterfly

Atalopedes huron (commonly known as huron skipper or huron sachem) is a small grass skipper butterfly. Formerly treated as a subspecies of Atalopedes campestris, it was upgraded to full species status by Zhang et al. in 2022.

== Description ==
Wingspan is 1 to 1 1/2 inches (2.5 to 3.8 cm). The males are tawny orange with wide dark borders with prominent wide black stigma on the dorsal view of their wings. Hingwings have dark veins. Females are dark with orange forewing edges; two glassy (hyaline) spots near the center and smaller spots near tip. Ventrally the wings are yellow brown with faint hindwing chevron patterns that frame a yellow brown spot in middle of the hindwing bottom edge. Females are muddier and more olive with the chevron pattern more pronounced.

== Range ==
Resident in southeastern United States, west to Colorado and SE Arizona, and south all the way to South America. Stages a late summer/fall migration every year, rarely reaching as far as southern Canada. (Note that Atalopedes campestris is now the western species, and AZ is the only state where both species are present.)
