= USS Marmora (IX-189) =

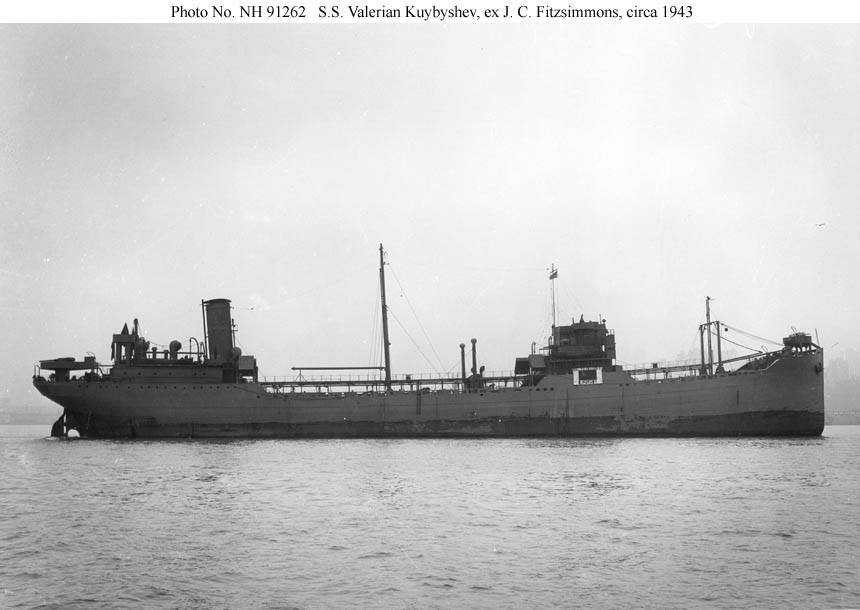
- The Soviet tanker SS Valerian Kuybyshev at San Francisco, California, ca. 1943. She served in the United States Navy from 1944 to 1946 as USS Marmora (IX-189).

History

United States
- Name: USS Marmora
- Namesake: Variant spelling of Marmara, an island in the Sea of Marmara
- Builder: American Shipbuilding Company, Seattle, Washington
- Completed: 1918
- Acquired: 13 December 1944
- Commissioned: 13 December 1944
- Decommissioned: 11 February 1946
- Fate: Delivered for scrapping 1 February 1947

General characteristics
- Type: Tanker
- Displacement: 14,000 tons (lim.)
- Length: 436 ft 6 in (133.05 m)
- Beam: 57 ft 2 in (17.42 m)
- Draft: 24 ft 0 in (7.32 m) (lim.)
- Installed power: 2,800 shp (2,100 kW)
- Propulsion: one Hooven, Owens, Rentschler Company vertical triple expansion steam engine; three single-end Scotch boilers, 200psi Sat°; two recip-drive 20 kW 120 V DC Ship's Service Generators; one shaft
- Speed: 9.0 knots (16.7 km/h)
- Capacity: 7,700 bbl (~1,100 t)
- Complement: 8 officers and 88 enlisted men
- Armament: 1 × single 4"/50 caliber gun or 5"/51 caliber gun (sources differ); 1 × single 3"/50 caliber dual purpose gun; 6 × 20 mm AA guns; 2 × .50-caliber machine guns

The second USS Marmora (IX-189) was a United States Navy tanker in commission from 1944 to 1946. She saw service as a mobile floating storage ship during and in the immediate aftermath of World War II.

== Construction and early history ==
The ship was built as SS Montrolite by the American Shipbuilding Company at Seattle, Washington, in 1918. She operated in commercial service and was renamed SS J. S. Fitzsimmons in 1926.

After the outbreak of World War II, Standard Oil of California chartered J.S. Fitzsimmons on 22 April 1942. Under the Lend-Lease program, the United States transferred her to the Soviet Union on 14 October 1942. In Soviet service she was renamed SS Valerian Kuybyshev. The Soviet Union returned her to the United States at Pearl Harbor, Territory of Hawaii, on 13 December 1944, and the U.S. War Shipping Administration took control of her under her former name, SS J. S. Fitzsimmons. The same day, the U.S. Navy acquired her from the War Shipping Administration under a bareboat charter and commissioned her as the miscellaneous unclassified ship USS Marmora (IX-189) for use as a mobile floating storage ship.

== Service history ==
=== World War II ===
Assigned to the Service Force, United States Pacific Fleet, Marmora departed Pearl Harbor on 28 January 1945 bound for the Marshall Islands, arriving at Eniwetok on 13 February 1945 for duty as a mobile floating storage ship. Four days later she continued on to Saipan in the Mariana Islands, anchoring there on 27 February to begin unloading aviation gasoline she had brought from Pearl Harbor.

On 31 March 1945, Marmora departed for the Caroline Islands, reaching Ulithi on 3 April 1945. She next stopped at the Ryukyu Islands, operating out of Okinawa from 28 May 1945 through the Japanese surrender on 15 August 1945.

=== Postwar ===
Marmora continued to operate from Okinawa until 1 November 1945, when she departed bound for the United States Gulf Coast via Pearl Harbor and the Panama Canal. She arrived at Mobile, Alabama, on 4 January 1946.

== Disposal ==
On 11 February 1946, Marmora decommissioned at Mobile and was delivered to the War Shipping Administration, returning to her former name SS J. C. Fitzsimmons. She later was sold to the Pinto Island Metals Company for scrapping. She was delivered to Pinto Island Metals on 1 February 1947, and subsequently scrapped.
