= Atalopedes campestris =

Conservation status
- Secure (NatureServe)

Scientific classification
- Kingdom: Animalia
- Phylum: Arthropoda
- Clade: Pancrustacea
- Class: Insecta
- Order: Lepidoptera
- Family: Hesperiidae
- Genus: Atalopedes
- Species: A. campestris

Binomial name
- Atalopedes campestris Boisduval, 1852

Species of butterfly

Atalopedes campestris (commonly known as the sachem or field skipper) is a small grass skipper butterfly. It has a wingspan of 35–41 mm (1 3/8–1 5/8 in). Male is orange, edged with brown, and has a large brown-black stigma. Female is darker with lighter markings in the center of the wing.

== Description ==
The sachem's wingspan is 35–41 mm (1 3/8–1 5/8 in). The sexes are dissimilar but both have elongated wings. The uppersides of the male forewing are orange bordered with brown and have a large four sided black stigma. The color of the uppersides of the female wings are dark brown with golden spots in the center but are highly variable, light to very dark. The uppersides of the female forewing have a black median spot and several semi-transparent spots. Females can always be identified by the square white transparent spot at the end of the forewing cell.

Underside of wings on both sexes are variable but the female hindwing is brown with light colored four-sided spots.

The sachem is often mistaken for other skipper butterflies in the genus Hesperia.

In 2022, the population in the eastern part of the continent was designated a separate species, A. huron, the huron sachem.

== Distribution and habitat ==
Atalopedes campestris can be found in open, disturbed areas such as roadsides, lawns, pastures, parks, oil fields, and landfills.

It had been observed that the sachem expanded its range northward rapidly during the beginning of the 21st century. A study by Crozier shows that this expansion is due to the winter warming trend of climate change rather than evolution of cold tolerance for this species.

== Life cycle ==
The sachem butterfly undergoes fours stages of complete metamorphosis:

=== Eggs ===
Eggs are greenish-white and are laid singly on or near the host plant leaves. The height of the egg is 0.9–1.0 mm (1/32–3/64 in). The width of the egg is 0.6–0.7 mm (1/48–1/32 in). The egg has polygonal sculpturing on its surface.

=== Larvae ===
The Atalopedes campestris larva (or caterpillar) goes through five stages called instars. Each caterpillar must shed its exoskeleton in order to grow. Differences between instars can be seen in altered body proportions, colors, patterns, changes in the number of body segments, or head width.

Larvae of the Family Hesperiidae "have a head, three thoracic segments, and ten abdominal segments." Each segment in the thorax has a pair of true legs. Segments three to six and ten in the abdomen have prolegs. Respiration openings, called spiracles, can be found on the first segment of the thorax and segments one to eight of the abdomen.

The last abdominal segment, segment ten, features an anal comb. The anal comb is shaped like a fan and located near the anus to launch the caterpillar excrement, or frass, away from the caterpillar. Sometimes the frass is propelled several feet away.

The sachem caterpillar's head is black. Its body is dark olive green with black dots or bumps and a dark dorsal line. The legs are brown. The length of the larvae in the last instar varies from 18 to 40 mm (3/4 to 1 5/8 in).

The larvae construct nests made of a host plant leaf (or leaves) and silk that they excrete. They build new shelters as they grow and move through their different instars. The larvae spend most of their lives in these shelters.

=== Pupa ===
The sachem larva pupates in the same silked-leaf nest where it spends most of its life.

The pupa is dark brown, almost black and is cream colored on the end of the abdomen which has brown dots. The proboscis extends 2 mm (5/64 in) beyond the wings. The length of the pupa is 18.0–22.5 mm (23/32–7/8 in) with a width of 4.30–5.83 mm (1/8–1/4 in).

The pupae of hesperiid have the same basic structure as the larvae—a head, three thoracic segments, and ten abdominal segments. The last abdominal segment is modified into the cremaster which is used to cement the pupa to the nest. Before an adult butterfly emerges from the pupa, the legs, wing, and antennae of the butterfly can be seen in the pupa; these are cemented to the body.

=== Adult ===
An adult butterfly emerges from the pupa. The time that adult sachems take flight, mate, and the female lays fertilized eggs is known as a flight. This happens three times, May through November, in the northern part of their range. In the southern part of their range, flights occur four to five times, March through December. Males perch on grasses during the day to await females. Migration occurs to the north and only one mass migration is known to occur in late summer.

== Larval host plants ==
The host plants used by the sachem caterpillar are various grasses including Bermuda grass, hairy crabgrass, red fescue, St. Augustine grass, Indian goosegrass, seashore saltgrass, and Imperata cylindrica.

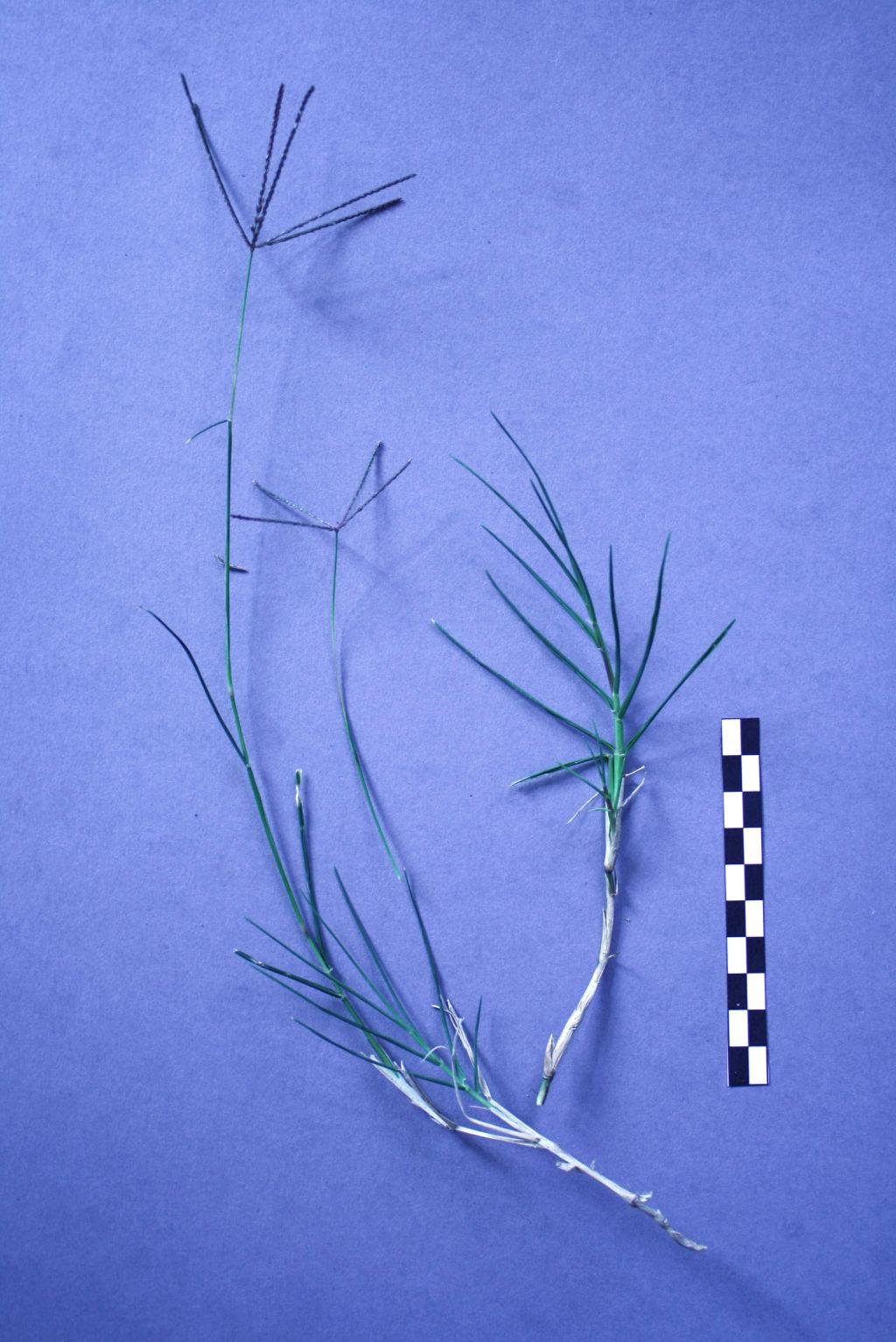
Bermuda grass (Cynodon dactylon)

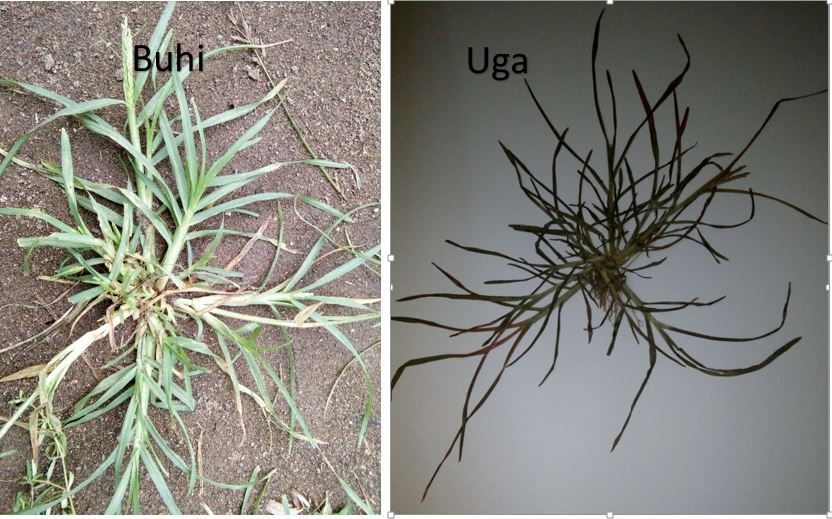
Crab grass (Digitaria sanguinalis)

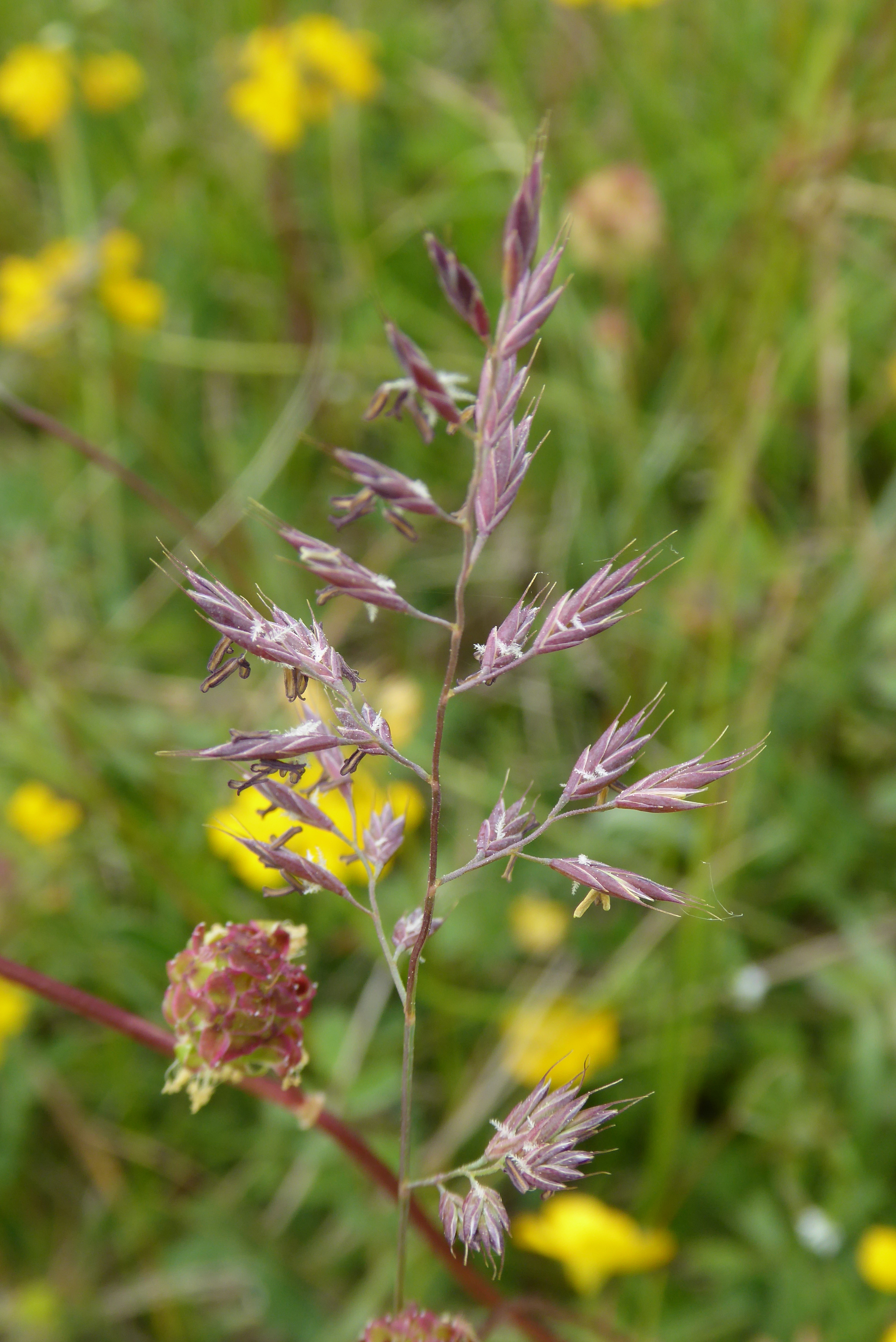
red fescue (Festuca rubra)

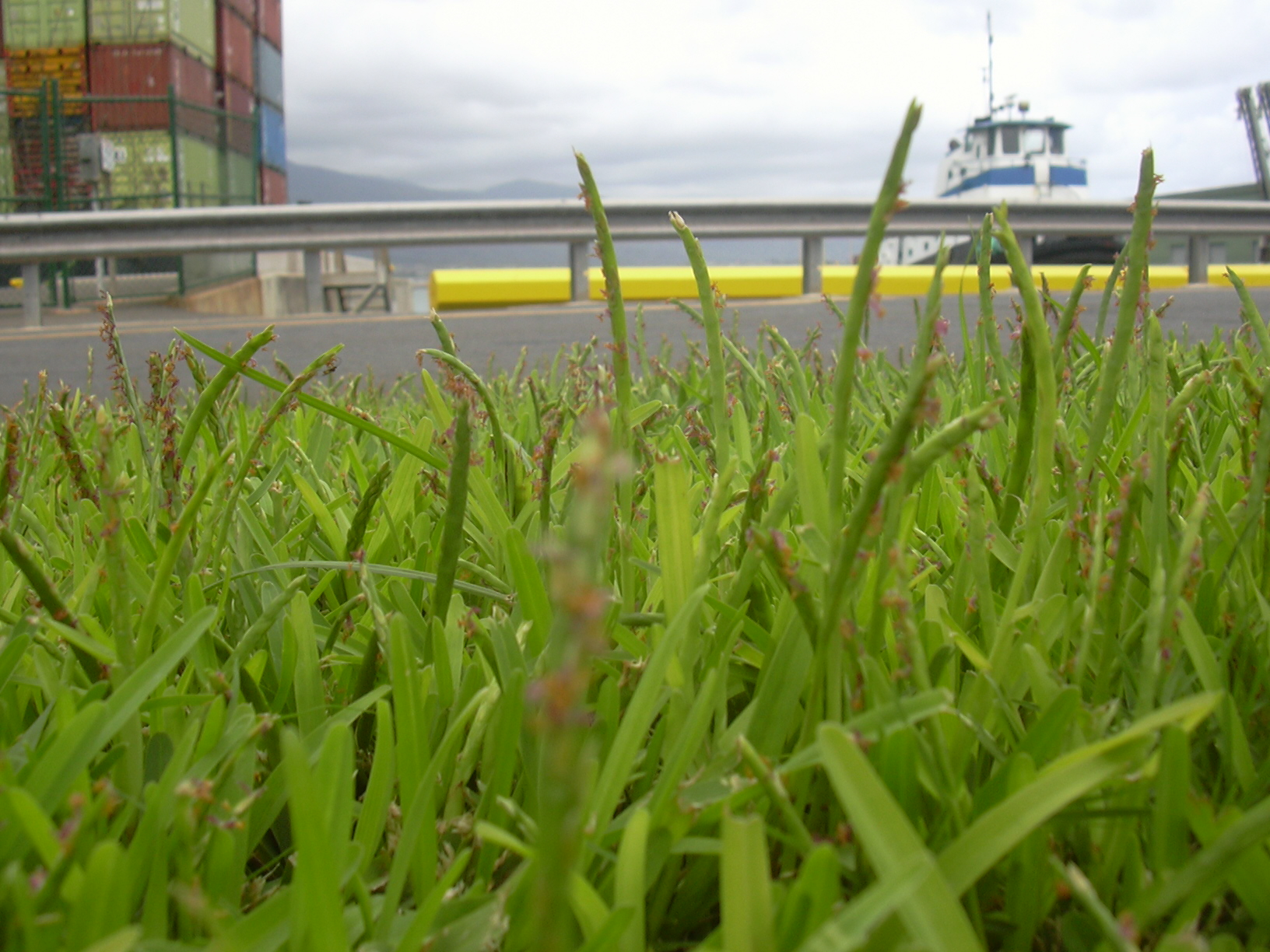
St. Augustine grass (Stenotaphrum secundatum)

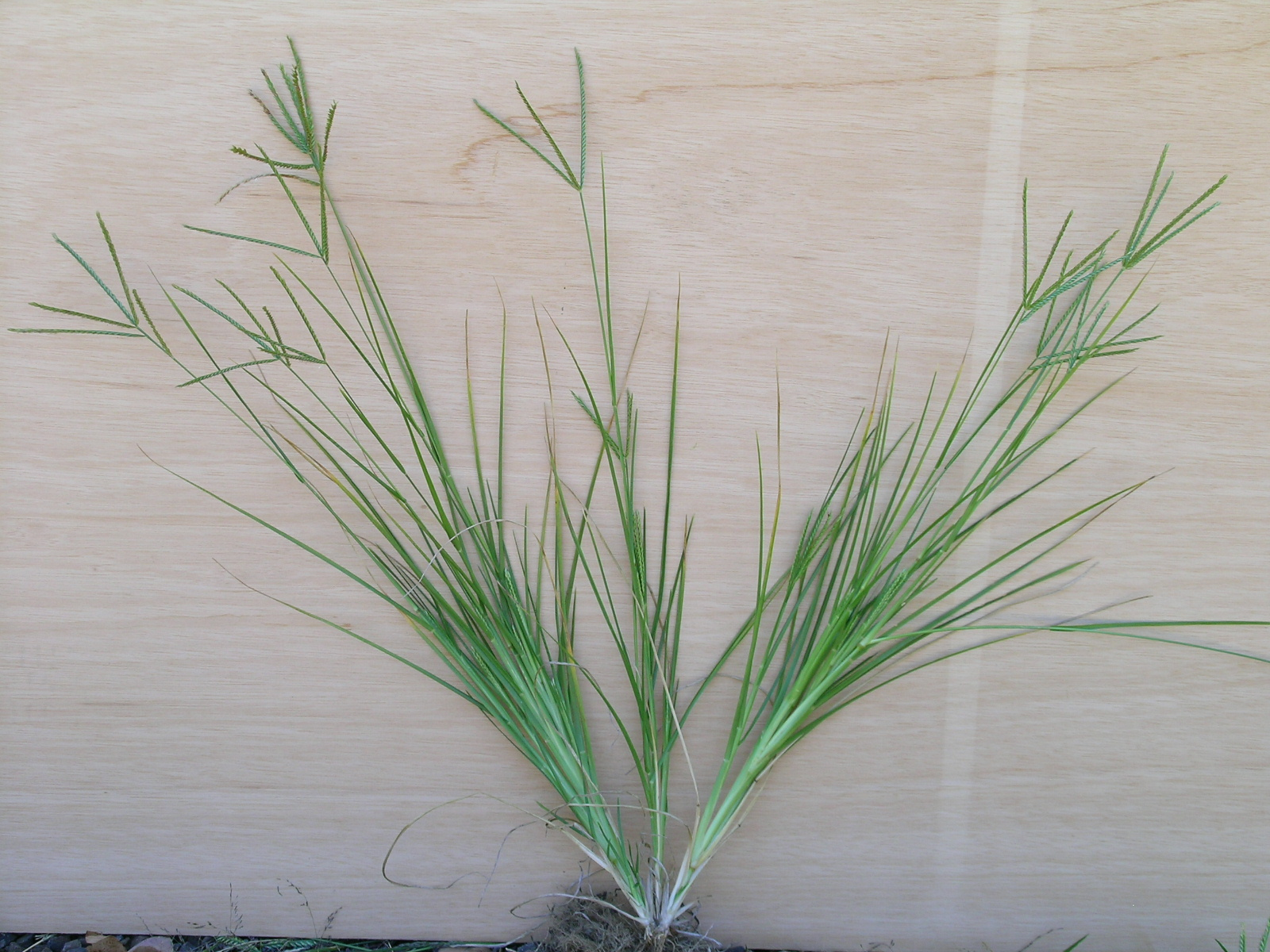
Indian goosegrass (Eleusine indica)

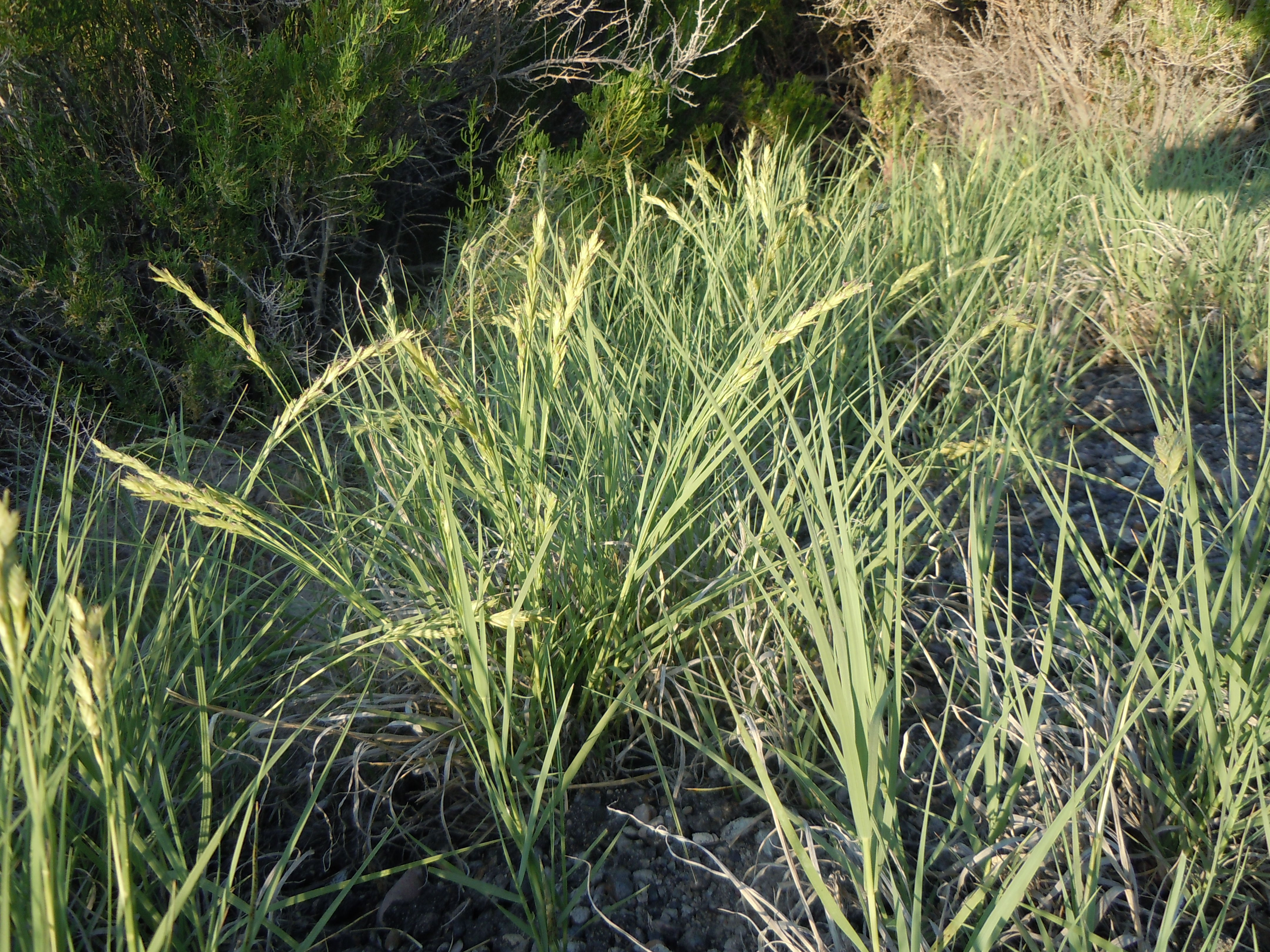
seashore saltgrass (Distichlis spicata)

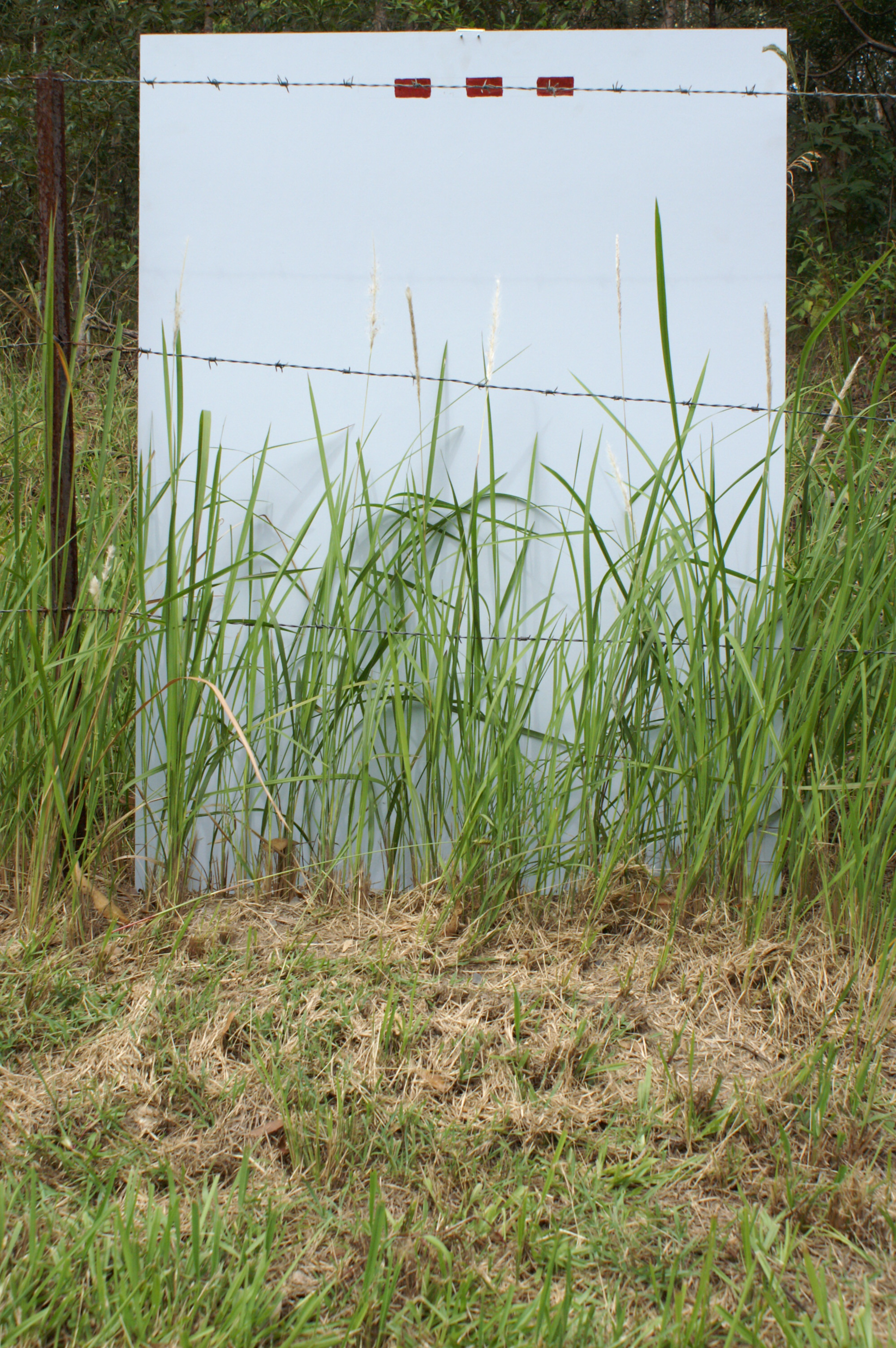
Imperata cylindrica
