= USS Escalante =

Oiler of the United States Navy

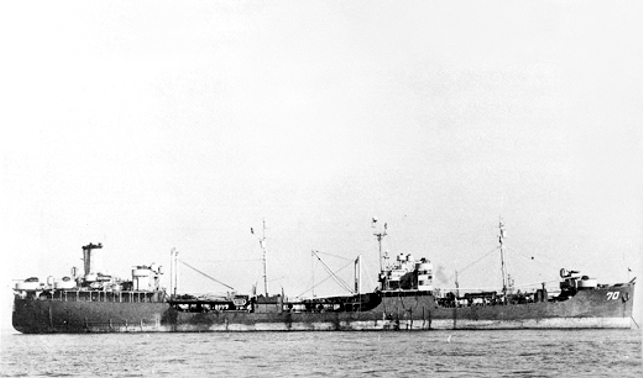
- USS Escalante (AO-70) at anchor c1945

History

United States
- Name: USS Escalante
- Namesake: Escalante River in Utah
- Ordered: as T2-SE-A1 tanker hull
- Laid down: in 1942 as SS Shabone
- Launched: 29 September 1942
- Commissioned: 30 January 1943
- Decommissioned: 12 December 1945
- Stricken: date unknown
- Fate: transferred to the Maritime Commission

General characteristics
- Class & type: Chiwawa class oiler
- Type: MARAD T3-S-A1
- Tonnage: 16,543 DWT
- Displacement: 21,077 tons
- Length: 501 ft 7.75 in (152.9017 m)
- Beam: 68 ft (21 m)
- Draft: 29 ft 10.5 in (9.106 m)
- Depth: 37 ft (11 m)
- Installed power: 7,000 shp (5,200 kW)
- Propulsion: geared steam turbine; single screw
- Speed: 15.3 knots (28.3 km/h)
- Range: 14,500 nmi (26,900 km; 16,700 mi)
- Capacity: 133,800 bbl (~18,250 t)
- Complement: 13 officers 200 enlisted
- Armament: one 5 in (130 mm) dual purpose gun mount, four 3 in (76 mm)/50 guns, four twin 40 mm gun mounts, four twin 20 mm gun mounts

USS Escalante (AO-70) was a T3 Kennebec-class oiler built for the United States Navy during World War II. She was the only U.S. Navy ship named for the Escalante River in Utah.

== History ==
Escalante (AO-70), formerly SS Shabone, was constructed for the Maritime Commission by the Bethlehem Steel Sparrows Point Shipyard, Inc., Sparrow's Point, Maryland, in 1942 and sponsored by Mrs. Walter E. Than. She was acquired by the Navy and commissioned on 30 January 1943.

After a brief shakedown cruise in the Chesapeake Bay area, she transported a cargo of aviation gasoline from Houston, Texas, to the Panama Canal Zone. She was then assigned to duty with the Atlantic Fleet, with Task Forces 60 and 61. Between May 1943 and 30 October 1944 she made six trips to North Africa and two to United Kingdom ports where she fueled ships for the Normandy invasion.

Escalante returned to Norfolk Navy Yard for overhaul to fit her for duty in the Pacific. On 4 December 1944 she loaded fuel at Aruba, passed through the Panama Canal and arrived at Pearl Harbor on 26 December. She reported to Service Squadron 10 to operate mainly from Ulithi in refueling units of the U.S. 3rd Fleet and the U.S. 5th Fleet at sea and thereby taking part in the action against Luzon, Iwo Jima, Okinawa and the Japanese homeland. From 26 September 1945 until 20 October she fueled ships in Tokyo Bay and then set sail for San Francisco, California, arriving on 31 October.

She was placed out of commission on 12 December 1945 and transferred to the Maritime Commission for disposal. She served in commercial service as the SS George McDonald until 30 June 1960 when she foundered approximately 165 miles east of Savannah, GA.

== Awards and honors ==
Escalante received four battle stars for World War II service.
