= USS Niobrara =

Oiler of the United States Navy

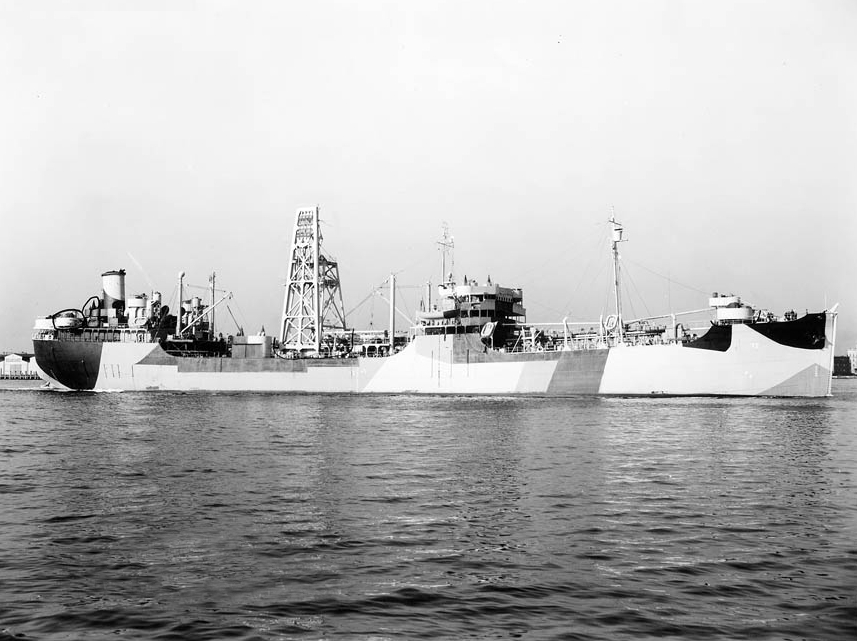
- No Photo Available

History

United States
- Name: USS Niobrara
- Namesake: Niobrara River
- Builder: Bethlehem Sparrows Point Shipyard
- Laid down: 29 June 1942
- Launched: 28 November 1942
- Acquired: 13 March 1943
- Commissioned: 13 March 1943
- Decommissioned: 24 September 1946
- Recommissioned: 5 February 1951
- Decommissioned: 30 November 1954
- Recommissioned: 14 December 1956
- Decommissioned: 12 November 1957
- Stricken: 1 February 1959
- Honors and awards: 4 battle stars (World War II)
- Fate: Sold for scrap, 22 March 1982

General characteristics
- Class & type: Chiwawa class oiler
- Type: MARAD T3-S-A1
- Tonnage: 16,543 DWT
- Displacement: 21,077 tons
- Length: 501 ft 7.75 in (152.9017 m)
- Beam: 68 ft (21 m)
- Draft: 29 ft 10.5 in (9.106 m)
- Depth: 37 ft (11 m)
- Installed power: 7,000 shp (5,200 kW)
- Propulsion: geared steam turbine; single screw
- Speed: 15.3 knots (28.3 km/h)
- Range: 14,500 nmi (26,900 km; 16,700 mi)
- Capacity: 133,800 bbl (~18,250 t)
- Complement: 247
- Armament: 1 × 5"/38 caliber gun; 4 × 3"/50 caliber guns; 4 × twin 40 mm AA guns; 6 × twin 20 mm AA guns

USS Niobrara (AO-72) was a T3 Kennebec-class oiler constructed for the United States Navy during World War II. She was the only U.S. Navy ship named for the Niobrara River in Nebraska.

The ship was laid down on 29 June 1942 by Bethlehem Steel Co., Sparrows Point, Maryland, as a type T3-S-A1 tanker named SS Citadel, under a Maritime Commission contract (MC hull 520). Launched on 28 November 1942, sponsored by Mrs. Mark O'Dea, she was acquired by the Navy and commissioned as USS Niobrara on 13 March 1943.

== Service history ==
=== World War II, 1943–1945 ===
Shakedown and fueling-at-sea training completed, Niobrara sailed from Norfolk, Virginia, on 17 April 1943 to carry oil to Argentia, Newfoundland, then ferried oil from ports in Texas and Aruba, Netherlands West Indies, to Mediterranean ports to support operations in the invasions of North Africa and Sicily. In March 1944 she was altered at Norfolk for Pacific service, and sailed for the Panama Canal, Pearl Harbor, and Kwajalein where she fueled transports bound for the Marianas invasions begun in June 1944.

Niobrara served as station tanker at Eniwetok until July, then operated from that base fueling ships at sea, thus enabling carrier task forces to roam the western Pacific and the Philippine Sea without interrupting their strikes to return to port. On 1 October she arrived in Kossol Roads, Palaus, to serve as station tanker for smaller combatants patrolling during the assault and occupation of the Palaus, then for forces preparing for the return to the Philippines. On 8 January 1945, she herself proceeded to Leyte, then into the South China Sea to fuel task force TF 38, then attacking the China coast.

During the next two months, she served at Ulithi and Saipan fueling ships for the Iwo Jima invasion and preparing for the Okinawa campaign. She sailed 26 March from Ulithi for Okinawa, and after refueling 5th Fleet striking units at sea, closed Hagushi Beach on 5 April to fuel radar picket destroyers. Air and submarine alerts, as well as gunfire close ashore, required expert seamanship to refuel ships alongside while maneuvering to protect the ship. She continued to support ships patrolling off Okinawa and carrier striking forces until the end of the war.

=== Post-war activities, 1945–1946 ===
Niobrara entered Tokyo Bay on 30 August to witness the surrender, and after three months' occupation duty, sailed for Guam, where she aided in salvage work. On 10 December she sailed for the Panama Canal and the east coast, along which she operated until decommissioning on 24 September 1946.

=== Atlantic Fleet, 1951–1954 ===
She lay in reserve at Philadelphia, Pennsylvania, until recommissioning on 5 February 1951 for three years' service with the Atlantic Fleet along the east coast, in the Caribbean, and in the Mediterranean. On 13 June 1954 she arrived in San Diego, California, to join the Pacific Fleet's operations until decommissioning on 30 November 1954.

=== Pacific Fleet, 1956–1957 ===
She recommissioned at San Francisco, California, on 14 December 1956 and again served in the Pacific Fleet until sailing to Galveston, Texas, where she decommissioned on 12 November 1957.

=== In reserve and disposal ===
She transferred to the Maritime Administration on 5 December 1957 and joined the National Defense Reserve Fleet at Beaumont, Texas. She was struck from the Naval Vessel Register on 1 February 1959, and disposed of by MARAD (Trade-in-exchange) on 22 March 1982, and then scrapped in Germany.

== Awards ==
Niobrara received 4 battle stars for World War II service.
