= Motor Torpedo Boat Squadron Two =

World War II Motor Torpedo Boat Squadron of US Navy

- Allegiance: United States
- Branch: United States Navy
- Operating Base: PT Boat Base Taboga Island; Torokina PT Boat Base; Naval Base Noumea; Naval Base Espiritu Santo
- Equipment: PT boats
- Engagements: Naval Battle of Guadalcanal; Guadalcanal campaign Solomons campaign Ironbottom Sound; The Slot

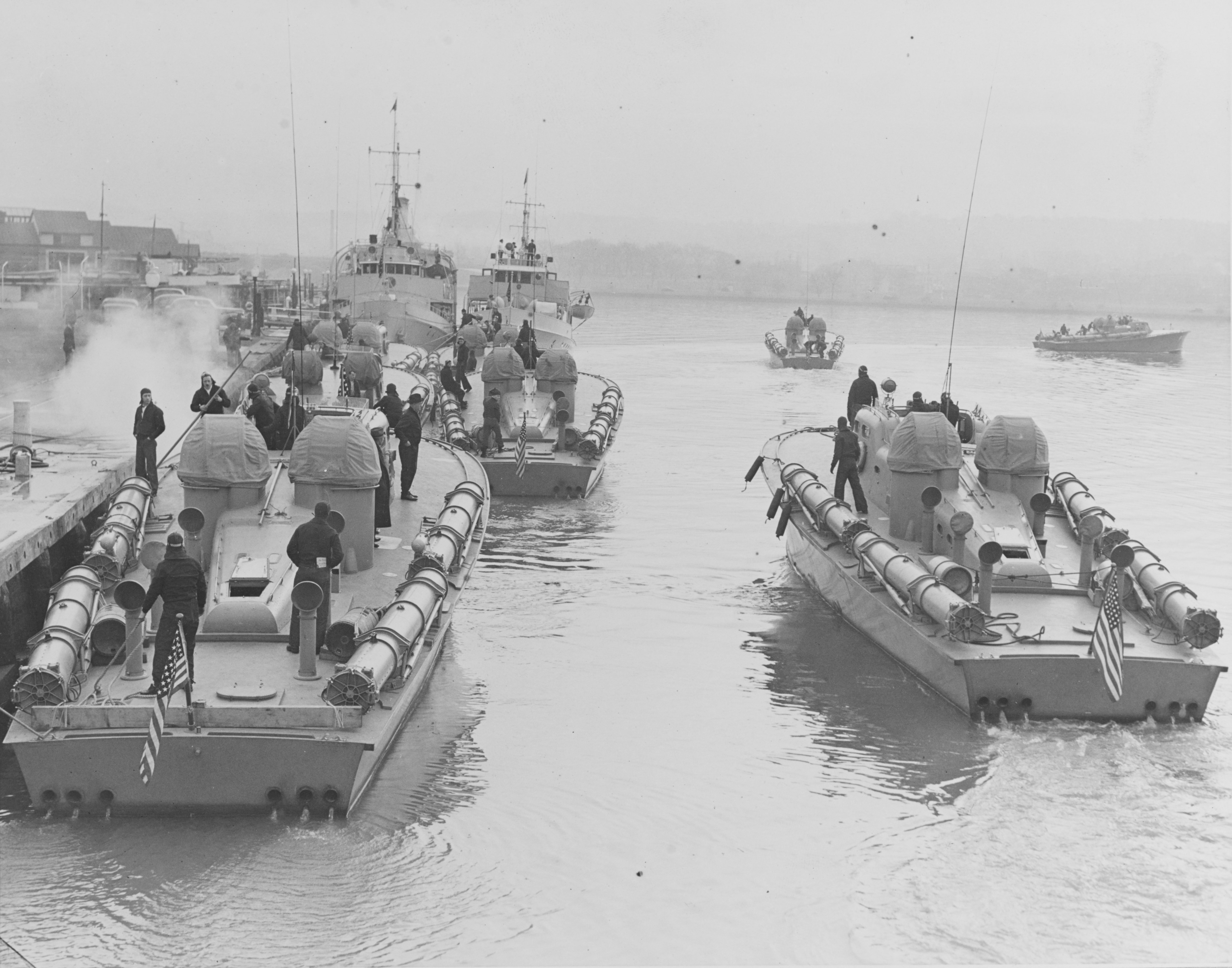
Navy PT Boats of Motor Torpedo Boat Squadron Two, Washington Navy Yard DC December 1940

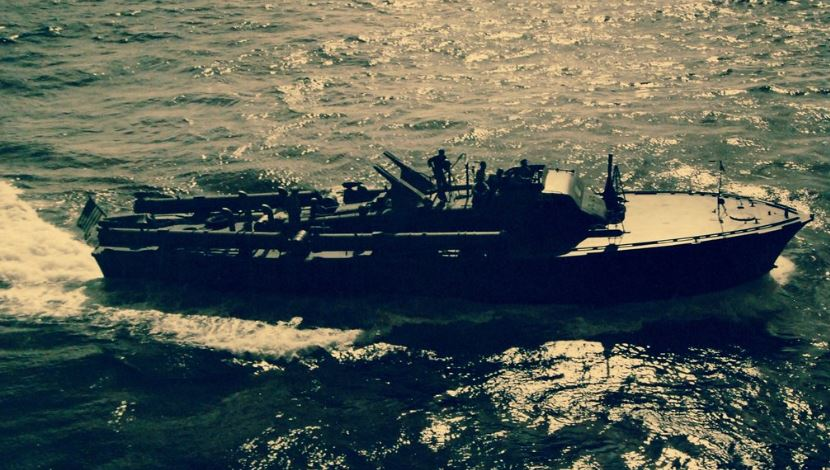
Patrol torpedo boat PT-30

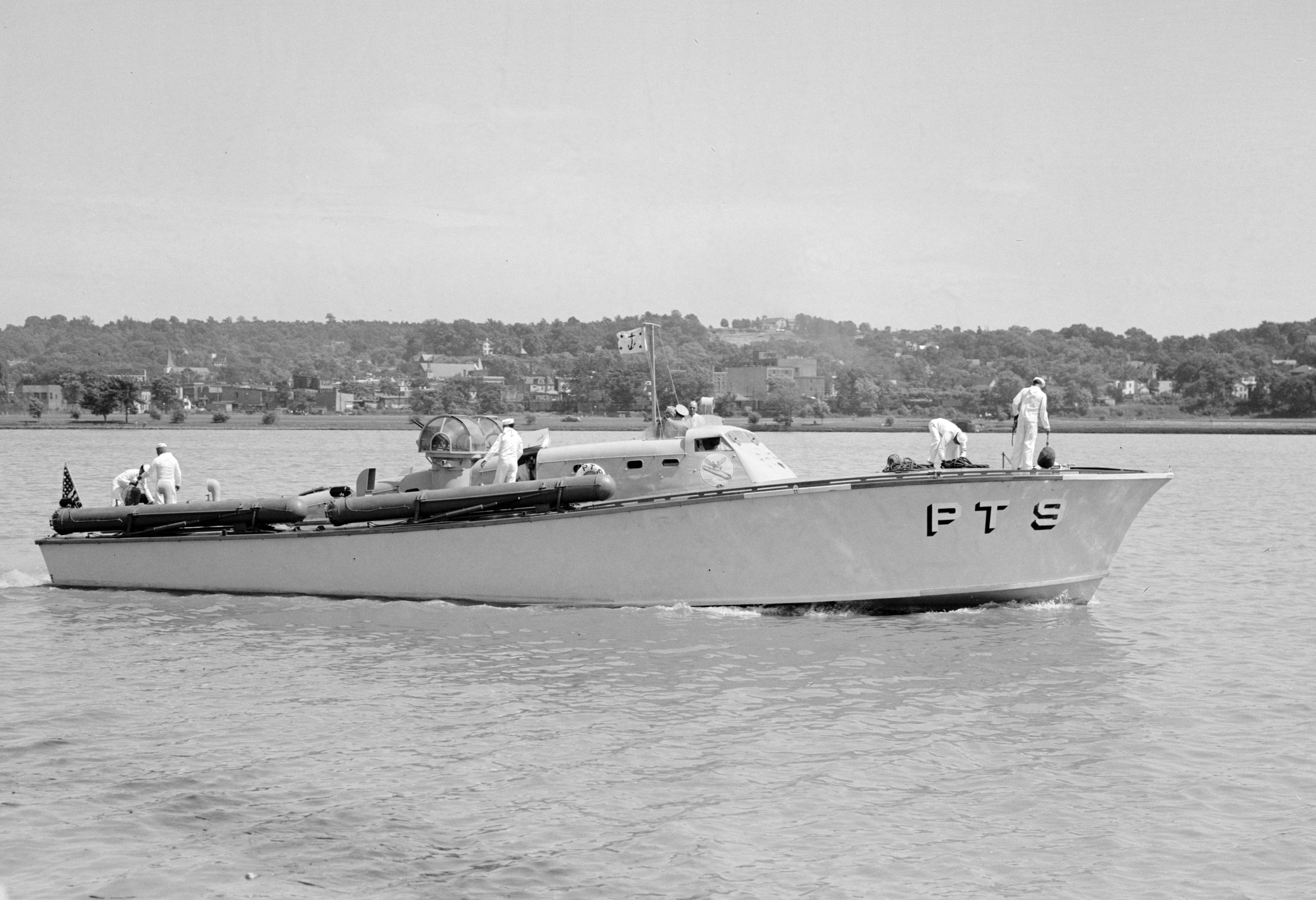
PT-9 torpedo boat in Washington DC in 1940

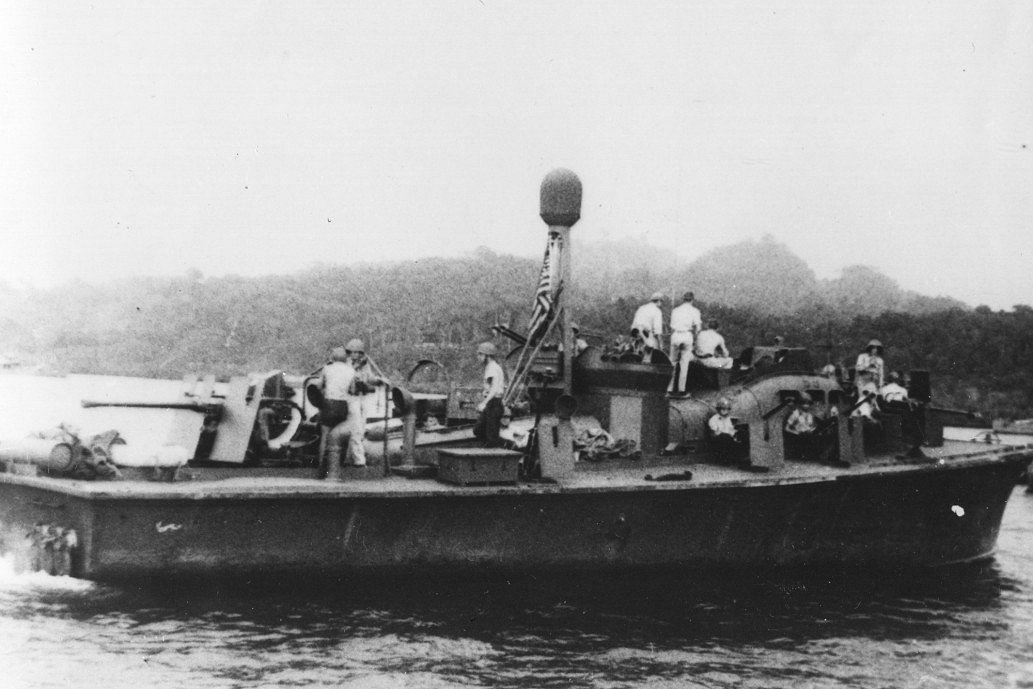
Patrol torpedo boat PT-59 afrer gunboat conversion Solomon Islands

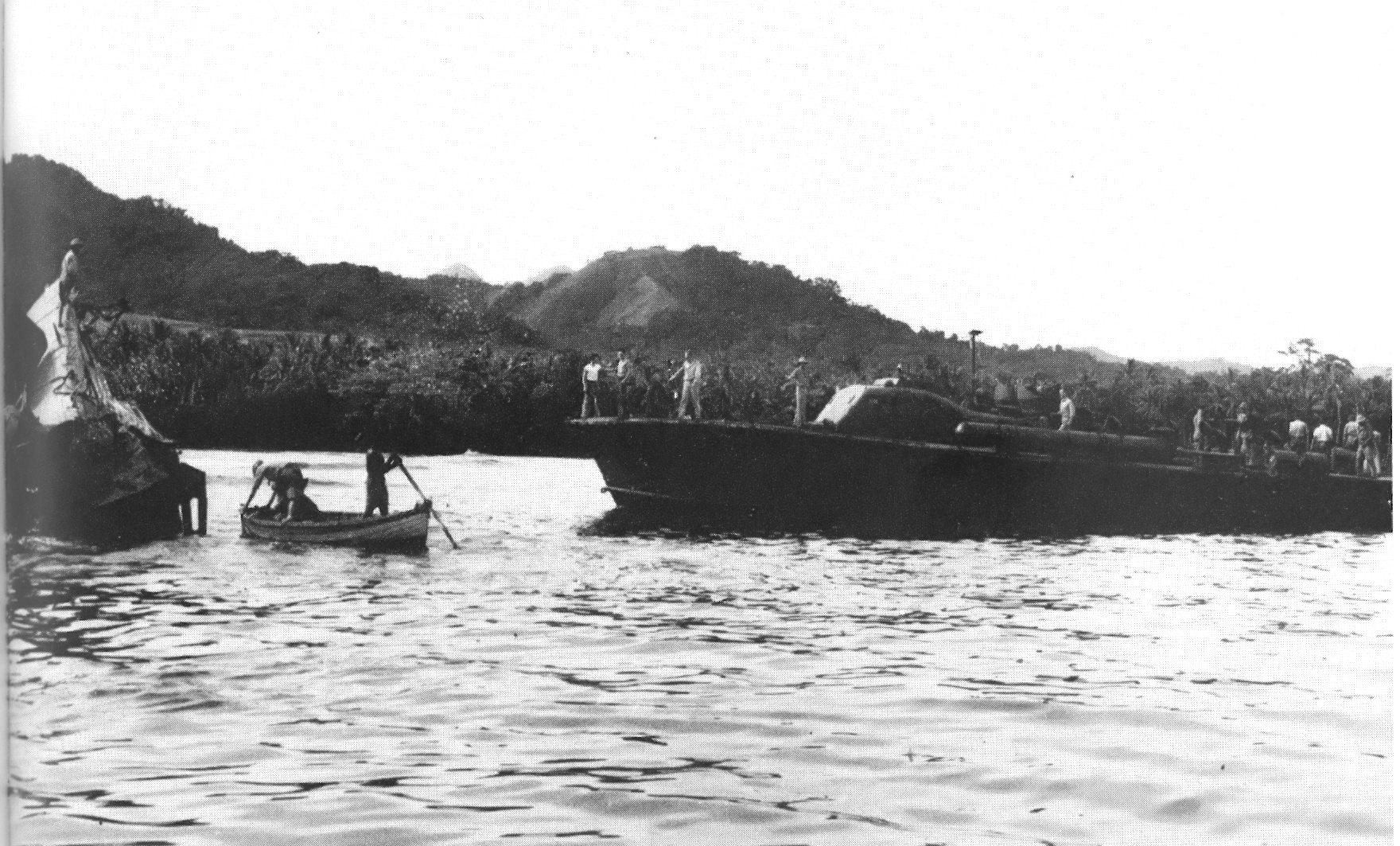
The crew of PT 59 inspects the wreckage of the Japanese submarine I-1, sunk on 29 January 1943 at Kamimbo on Guadalcanal by HMNZS Kiwi and Moa after Operation Ke

Motor Torpedo Boat Squadron Two (MTBRon 2) was a United States Navy PT boat squadron first based at Panama Sea Frontier in December 1941 with 11 new Elco Naval Division boats. Before Panama deployment MTBRon 2 tested new PT boats in Florida and the Caribbean. In fall 1942 with six of MTBRon 2 77-foot Elco boats and six 80-foot Elco boats were shipped to the South Pacific War operating against the Tokyo Express in the defense of Guadalcanal in the Solomons campaign.

== History ==
Motor Torpedo Boat Squadron Two was commissioned November 8, 1940 and decommissioned November 11, 1943. On November 8, 1940, Motor Torpedo Boat Squadron Two duty was to test new PT boats after the PT Boat design competition. A Plywood Derby was held to see which PT boat design was the best. Motor Torpedo Boat Squadron Two did testing in March 1941 in a boat run from Key West to New York. During the trip there was heavy weather with 8-to-10-foot (2.4 to 3.0 m) waves. The waves broke high over the PT boat's bows. All PT boats had sort of structural failure, was due to poor ballast attachment, some due to design problems. Motor Torpedo Boat Squadron One also took part in the testing. After the Plywood Derby testing, MTBRon 2 tested the first 70-foot Elc1o boats in Florida and the Caribbean under the command of Lt. Comdr. Earl S. Caldwell, USN. In December 1941, Motor Torpedo Boat Squadron Two was given 11 new 77-foot Elco boats and sent to Panama Sea Frontier, to protect the Panama Canal. The boats were loaded on the Aircraft Transport ship, USS Hammondsport (AKV-2), and USS Kitty Hawk at Brooklyn Navy Yard for the trip Panama. The PT boats were base out of PT Boat Base Taboga Island. On 10 Oct. 1942, Motor Torpedo Boat Squadron Two with six 77' Elco boats and six 80' Elco boats, were was shipped to the South Pacific on the Liberty ship SS Roger Williams. The Roger Williams arrived at Naval Base Noumea on 11 Nov. 1942. PT-111 and PT-112 were loaded aboard Tallulah (AO-50) for the trip to Noumea. The boats PT-38, PT-46, PT-48 and PT-60 were shipped on the ships USS Lackawanna (AO-40) and Tappahannock (AO-43) departing on August 29, 1942, arriving at Noumea on September 19, 1942.
The PT boats operated between Noumea and Naval Base Espiritu Santo, which had two bases. Motor Torpedo Boat Squadron Two was give the task of attacking the enemy ship in the Tokyo Express at night. The Motor Torpedo Boat Squadron Two was active in the Solomon Islands campaign in the defense of Guadalcanal. PT boats work to protect Lunga Point and Tulagi, Guadalcanal. John Kennedy transferred to Motor Torpedo Boat Squadron 2 on 23 February 1943 which was based at Tulagi Island in the Solomons at that time. Kennedy arrived at Tulagi on 14 April and took command of PT-109 on 23 April 1943. On 30 May 1943, some MTBRon 2 PT boats, with PT-109 were sent to the Russell Islands in preparation for the New Georgia campaign. After the Landings on Rendova, PT 109 was sent to Lumbari Island. Japanese destroyer Amagiri traveling at 40 knots as part to of the Tokyo Express cut PT-109 two. Other PT boats were lost: PT-111 was sunk by gunfire of the Japanese destroyer Kawakaze off Guadalcanalon 1 February 1943, near Savo Island and Cape Esperance, Russel J. Wackler was killed in attack. PT-112 was sunk off Guadalcanal, in Ironbottom Sound, by the Japanese destroyers Hatsukaze and Tokitsukaze on 11 January 1943, with no loss of life. Hatsukaze was severely damaged by a torpedo from PT-112. PT-43 was destroyed by its crew to prevent the boat from being capture on 11 January 1943 at Guadalcanal. PT-43 had suffering damages from Japanese destroyer Tokitsukaze the previous day. On 7 November 1942 PT-43 (Nicknamed Prep Tom and Deuce) hit a Japanese destroyer with two torpedoes off Koli Point. PT-37 was destroyed 1 February 1943 by Japanese destroyer Kawakaze off Guadalcanal PT-60 was damage in action on 14 October 1942 around 2:30 AM, grounding after attacking a Japanese destroyer, she was repaired at PT Boat Base Taboga Island. Some of MTBRon 2 boats operated out of Torokina PT Boat Base. On February 11, 1943, PT-60 under Lt. Jack Searles took a US Army intelligence team including Major General Alexander Patch to inspect the wreckage of Japanese submarine I-1 sunk in Kamimbo Bay off Guadalcanal. During the submarine I-1 mission PT-59 ran aground and had to be assisted off a reef. PT-44 was destroyed by enemy warships on 12 December 1942 shortly after midnight. PT-44 was hit by gunfire from Japanese destroyers Suzukaze and Kawakaze southwest of Savo Island at Iron Bottom Sound. PT-44 lost two officers and seven enlisted men. By 8 February 1943 Japanese ships depart Guadalcanal.

=== Motor Torpedo Boat Squadron Two (2) ===
Motor Torpedo Boat Squadron Two(2)- MTBRon 2(2) was commissioned March 23, 1944 and decommissioned September 21, 1945. MTBRon 2(2) was sub division of MTBRon 2(2) made for duty in the English Channel. MTBRon 2(2) operated in the English Channel from May 1944 to October 1944. MTBRon 2(2) did 20 special missions, including special operations landing personnel and supplies in enemy-occupied territory. With just three PT boat it was not given it own Motor Torpedo Boat Squadron number, the smallest MTBRon 2 in the war.

  - Squadron Commanders of MTBRon 2(2):
- Comdr. John D. Bulkeley—March 23 to July 15, 1944
- Lt. Robert R. Read, USNR—July 15, 1944 to February 2, 1945
- Lt. Joseph R. Ellicott, USNR—February 2 to September 21, 1945
  - Assigned PT boats to MTBRon 2(2):
  - Three 78' Higgins PT boats:
- PT-71 Transferred 18 March 1944 to MTBRon 2[2] under Comdr. John D. Bulkeley, USN
- PT-72 Transferred from MTBRon 4, March 18, 1944. Stricken October 11, 1945.
- PT-199 Transferred from MTBRon 4, March 18, 1944. Placed out of service September 21, 1945.

== MTBRon 2 commanders ==
  - Motor Torpedo Boat Squadron Two commanders during World War II:
- Lt. Comdr. Earl S. Caldwell: November 8, 1942 to 1940-May 1942
- Lt. Hugh M. Robinson: May 1942 to June 1942
- Lt. Comdr. Alan R. Montgomery: June 1942 to July 1942
- Lt. George A. Brackett, USNR: July 1942 to September 1942
- Lt. Rollin E. Westholm: September 1942 to December 1942
- Lt. Allen H. Harris, USNR" December 1942 to April 1943
- Lt. Alvin P. Cluster: April 1943 to November 11, 1943

== MTBRon 2 assigned PT boats ==
  - Some of MTBRon 2 PT boats were Transferred to Great Britain under the Lend-Lease act.
- PT-8 Prototype PT boat tested by MTBRon 2, Transferred from MTBRon 1 August 13, 1941. Reclassified as district patrol vessel, YP 110, October 14, 1941.
- PT-9 Prototype PT boat tested by MTBRon 2, Transferred from MTBRon 1, November 8, 1940. To Britain April 11, 1941.
- PT-10 Navy on November 7, 1940. To Britain, April 11, 1941.
- PT-11 Navy on November 12, 1940. To Britain April 11, 1941.
- PT-12 Navy on November 14, 1940. To Britain April 11, 1941.
- PT-13 Navy on November 26, 1940. To Britain April 11, 1941.
- PT-14 Navy on November 29, 1940. To Britain April 11, 1941.
- PT-15 Navy on December 5, 1940. To Britain April 11, 1941.
- PT-16 Navy on December 31, 1940. To Britain July 11, 1941.
- PT-17 Navy on December 16, 1940. To Britain July 11, 1941.
- PT-18 Navy on December 30, 1940. To Britain July 11, 1941.
- PT-19 Navy on December 31, 1940. Placed out of service July 2, 1941; To Britain.
- PT-20: Navy on June 20, 1941. Transferred to MTBRon 1 August 13, 1941.
- PT-22 Navy on June 21, 1941. Transferred to MTBRon 1 August 13, 1941. Called Flying Dueces badly damaged in Aleutian campaign by storm off Adak, AK 11 June 1943 and scrapped.
- PT-23 Transferred from S MTBRon 3 September 27, 1943. Reclassified as a Small Craft C-55047
- PT-24 Navy on June 26, 1941. Transferred to MTBRon 1 August 13, 1941. called Blue Bitch, struck 1947,
- PT-25 Transfer to MTBRon 3, later C55048 October 6, 1943
- PT-26 Navy on June 18, 1941. Transferred to MTBRon 1 August 13, 1941. Transferred MTBRon 3, September 27, 1943. Reclassified small boat October 6, 1943.
- PT-28 Navy on June 30, 1941. Transferred to MTBRon 1 August 13, 1941.
- PT-30: Transferred to MTBRon 1 August 13, 1941., sold in 1947 but fate is unknown.
- PT-32 Navy on July 10, 1941. Transferred to MTBRon 3 August 12, 1941.
- PT-34 Navy on July 12, 1941. Transferred to MTBRon 3 August 12, 1941.
- PT-36 Navy on August 27, 1941. Transferred to MTBRon 3 November 11, 1943.
- PT-37: Transferred 13 August 1941 to MTBRon 2, destroyed 1 February 1943 by Japanese off Guadalcanal
- PT-38 Navy on July 18, 1941. Transferred to MTBRon 3 July 27, 1942.
- PT-39 Transferred from MTBRon 1, August 13, 1941. Transferred to MTBRon 3 July 27, 1942.
- PT-40 Navy on July 22, 1941. Transferred to MTBRon 3 November 11, 1943.
- PT-42 Navy on July 25, 1941. Transferred to MTBRon 1, August 13, 1941. Transferred 12 August 1941 to MTBRon 3, struck December 12, 1944.
- PT-43 Transferred 13 August 1941 to MTBRon 2, destroyed to prevent capture 11 January 1943 at Guadalcanal
- PT-44 Navy July 31, 1941. Destroyed by enemy warships, December 12, 1942.
- PT-45 Navy September 3, 1941. Transferred to MTBRon 3, July 27, 1942.
- PT-46 Navy September 6, 1941. Transferred to MTBRon 3, July 27, 1942.
- PT-47 Navy September 9, 1941. Transferred to MTBRon 3, November 11, 1943.
- PT-59 Transferred from Squadron 4, May 7, 1942. Transferred to MTBRon 3, November 11, 1943.
- PT-48 Completed 15 September 1941, MTBRon 2 under Lt. Comdr. Earl S. Caldwell, USN. Kitty Hawk (APV 1) at Brooklyn Navy Yard 15 December 1941 for transit to Balboa, Canal Zone, arrived at Balboa 25 December 1941, Transferred 27 July to MTBRon 3(2)
- PT-60 MTBRon 2 tested in Florida and Caribbean 1940/41, 27 July 1942 to MTBRon 3
- PT-61 Transferred from Squadron 4, May 7, 1942. Transferred to MTBRon 3, July 27, 1942.
- PT-109 Transferred from MTBRon 5, September 22, 1942. Destroyed by enemy warship, August 2, 1943.
- PT-110 Transferred from MTBRon 5, September 22, 1942. Transferred to MTBRon 8, June 1, 1943.
- PT-111 Transferred from MTBRon 5, September 22, 1942. Destroyed by enemy warships, February 1, 1943.
- PT-112 Transferred from MTBRon 5, September 22, 1942. Destroyed by enemy warships, January 11, 1943.
- PT-113 Transferred 22 September 1942 to (PTRon 2) under Lt. George A. Brackett, USNR, Transferred 1 April 1943 to Motor PTRon 8
- PT-114 Transferred from MTBRon 5, September 22, 1942. Transferred to MTBRon 8, April 1, 1943.
- PT-144 Transferred from MTBRon 8, January, 1943. Transferred to MTBRon 8, June 1, 1943.
- PT-145 Transferred in January 1943 to MTBRon 2 under Lt. Allen H. Harris, USNR, Transferred 1 June 1943 to MTBRon 12.
- PT-146 Transferred from MTBRon 8, January, 1943. Transferred to Squadron 12, June 1, 1943.
- PT-147 Transferred in January 1943 to MTBRon 2 under Lt. Allen H. Harris, USNR, Transferred 1 June 1943 to MTBRon 18
- PT-148 Transferred from MTBRon 8, January, 1943. Transferred to Squadron 18, June 1, 1943.

== Surviving boat ==
Of the PT boats in Motor Torpedo Boat Squadron Two only one boat survived. At the end of the war PT boats were not needed and they used vast amount of fuel, so almost all were scrapped at the end of the war. Patrol torpedo boat PT-48 was the only Motor Torpedo Boat Squadron Two boat to survive. She is a Fleet Obsolete Kingston, New York for restoration. Fleet Obsolete is vessel restoration nonprofit 501(c)(3) organization that rescues and restores rare artifacts and boats from the World War II era.

== Gallery ==
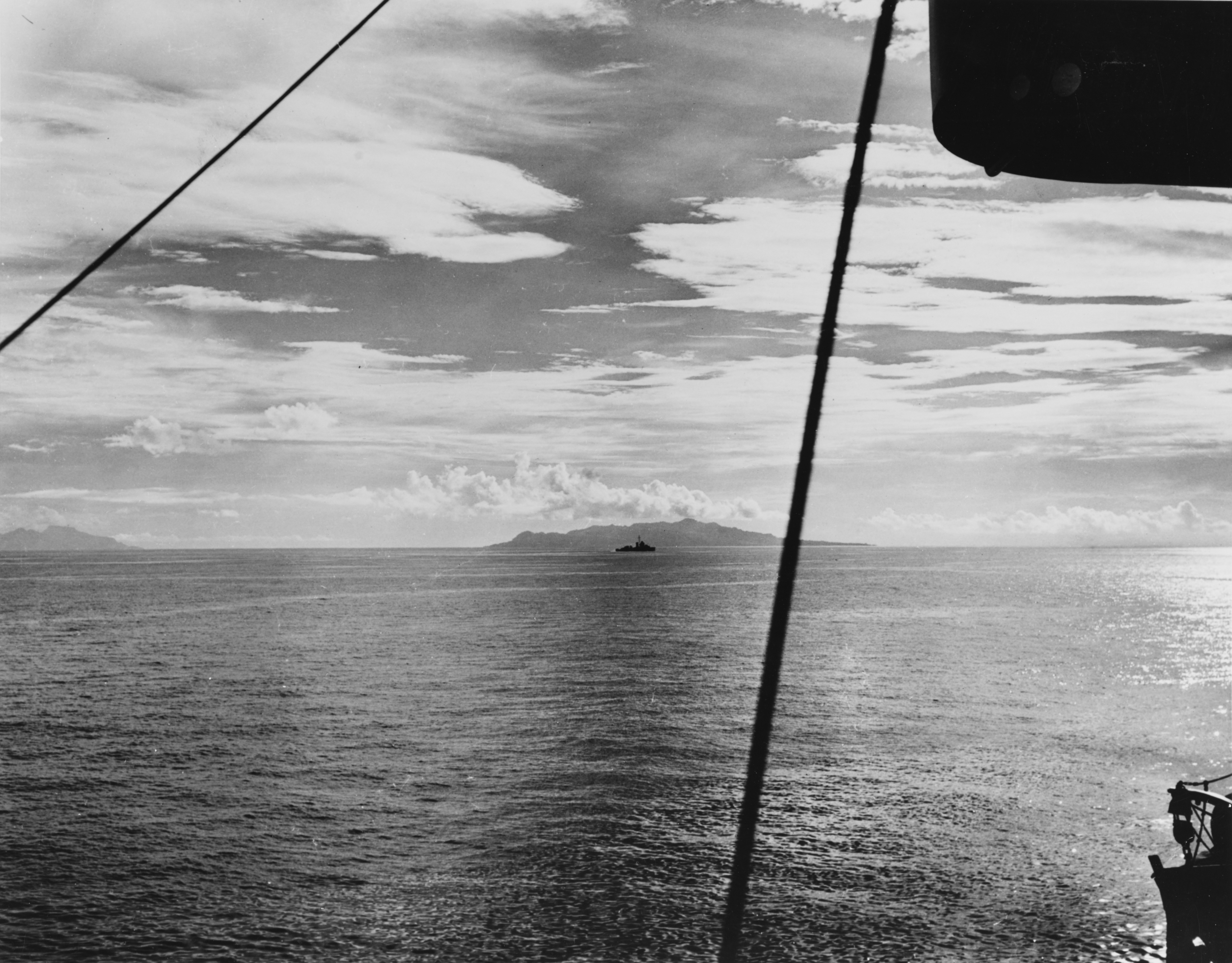
Ironbottom Sound, Savo Island (center), and Guadalcanal (left) on 7 August 1942, the day Allied forces landed on Guadalcanal and Tulagi

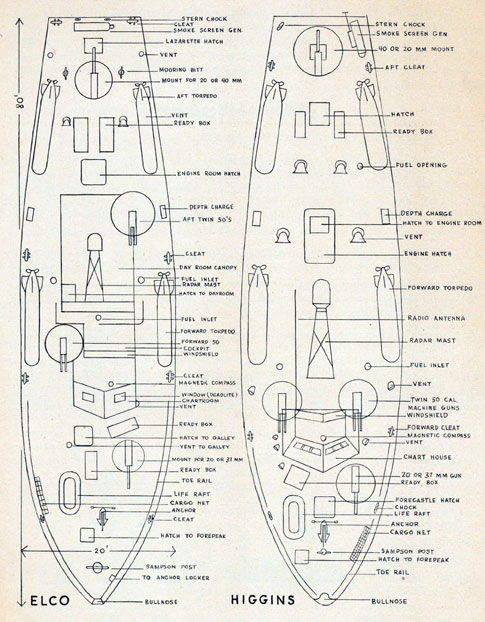
ELCO and Higgins PT boats, Know Your PT Boat US Navy July 1945

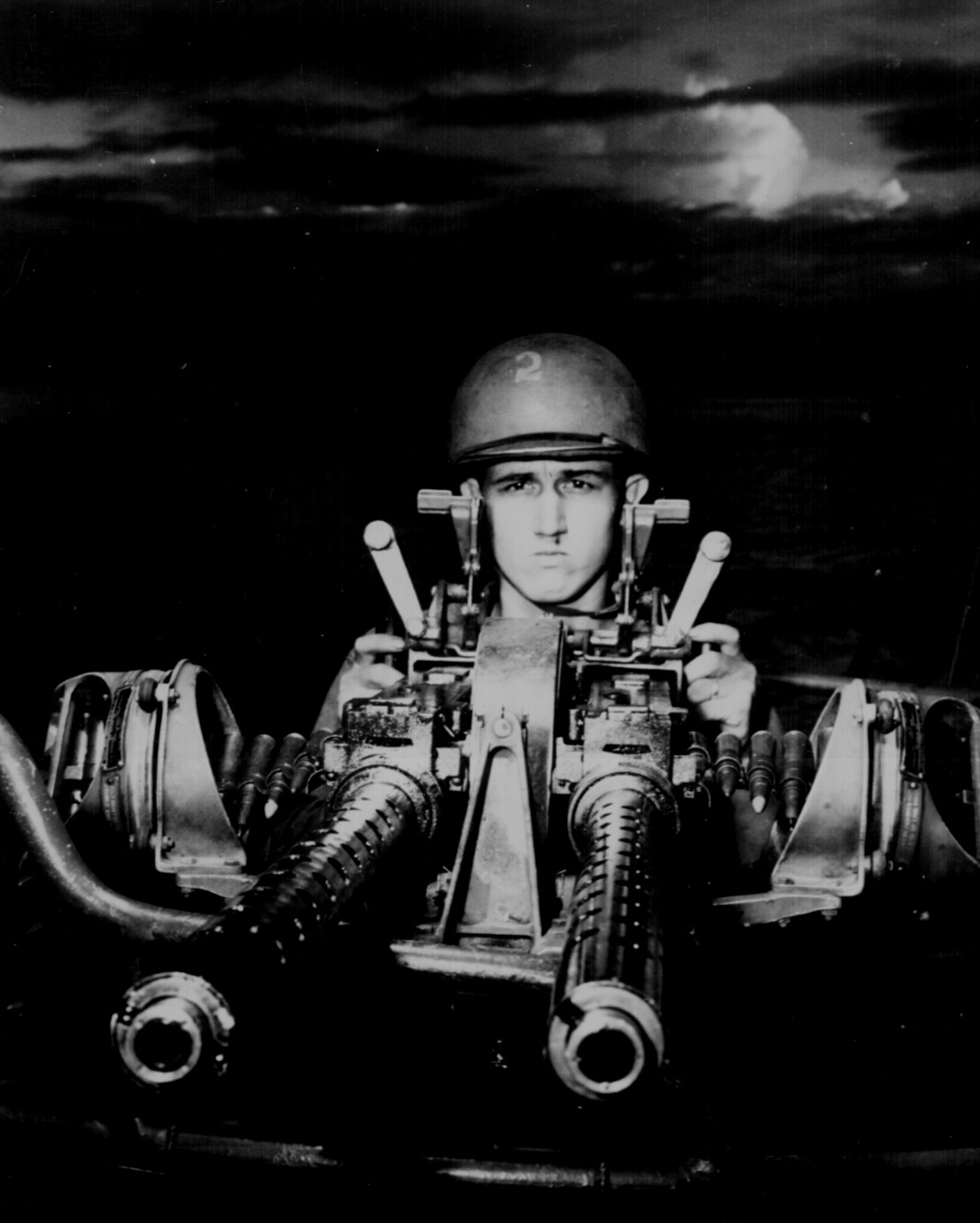
PT Boat 50 cal. gun M2 Browning

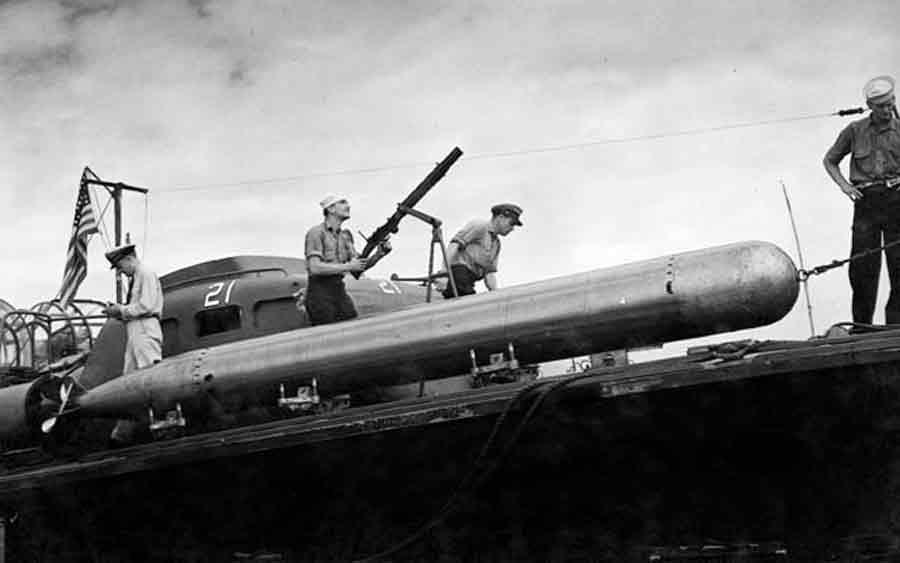
PT Mark 8 torpedo

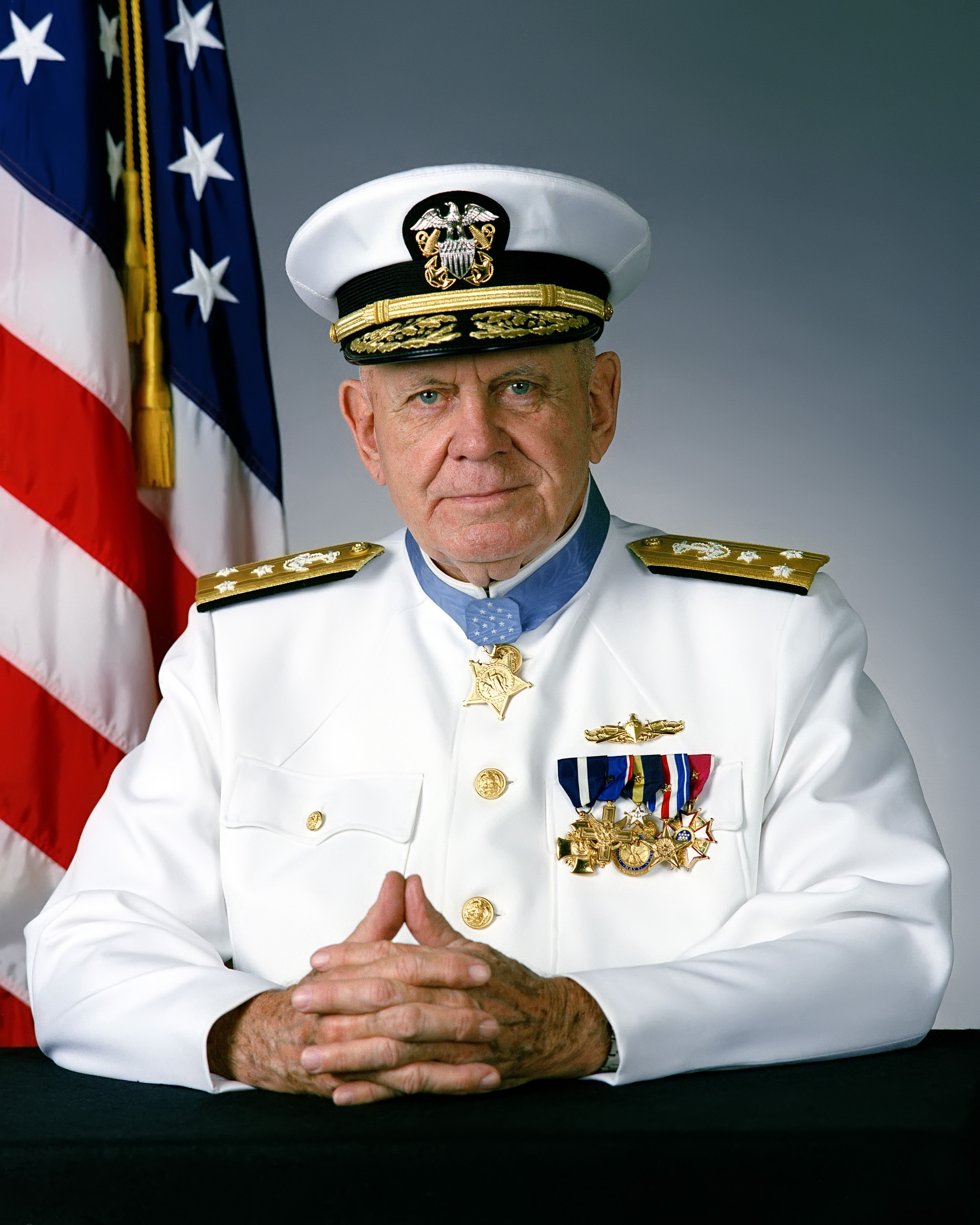
John D. Bulkeley

== See also ==
- New Guinea campaign
- New Britain campaign
- Gilbert and Marshall Islands campaign
- Operation Vengeance
- AirSols
- Battle of the Coral Sea
- Battle of the Treasury Islands

== Bibliography ==
- White, William L. (1942). They Were Expendable. London: H. Hamilton. LCCN 43008243.
- Bulkley, Robert J. Jr. (2012). "The Fleet Withdraws". At Close Quarters: PT Boats in the United States Navy. Historical Studies. ISBN 9781622800049.
- War Thunder Naval video
