= Fleet Obsolete =

Restoration organization of Torpedo boat of the U.S. Navy

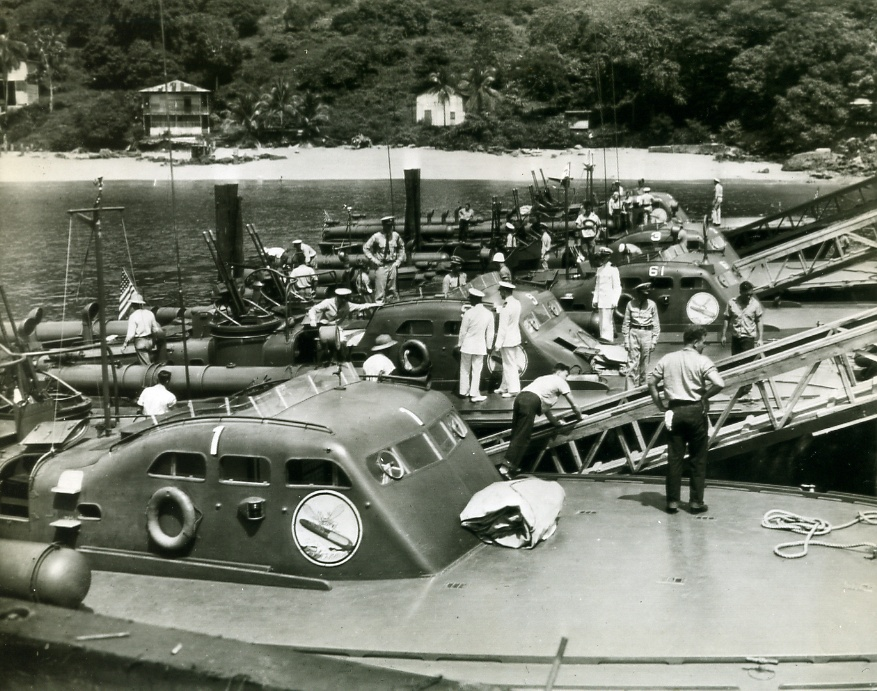
- Patrol torpedo boat PT-48, owned by Fleet Obsolete, in Panama in 1942. PT-48 is the last 77-foot Elco boat in the world.

- Location within New York
- Location: 108 East Strand, Kingston, New York, 12401
- Coordinates: 41.920333°N 73.978750°W
- Website: Fleet Obsolete website

Fleet Obsolete is vessel restoration nonprofit 501(c)(3) organization in Kingston, New York. Fleet Obsolete rescues and restores rare artifacts and boats from World War II era. Fleet Obsolete owns and is restoring four of the rare PT boats. Fleet Obsolete is housed in the historical Cornell Shops Building on the waterfront of the Hudson River at the mouth of Rondout Creek. Cornell Steamboat Company was founded in 1827 and used the Cornell Building as a machine shop. Fleet Obsolete was founded by Robert Iannucci in 2005. Robert Iannucci purchased five PT boats built during World War II. Robert Iannucci worked on racing teams for classic motorcycless and is now a retired Brooklyn attorney. Iannucci passion for United States Navy boats came from his time as a Sea Scout in Hackensack, New Jersey

== Fleet Obsolete boats ==
Fleet Obsolete boats as boat in restoration:

- Patrol torpedo boat PT-48 the last of the 77-foot Elco Naval Division, completed 15 September 1941
- Patrol torpedo boat PT-459, 78-foot Higgins Industries, New Orleans, completed 23 March 1944. Past names: Mahogany Menace and Beachcomber IV.
- Patrol torpedo boat PT-486, 80-foot Elco Naval Division, completed 25 November 1943, past name US Navy C105335.
- Patrol torpedo boat PT-615 80-foot Elco PT boat, completed 25 November 1943. Past names: C105341, Huckster, Tarbaby and Flagship III.
- U.S. Army Tug ST-2201 built by Smith's Basin in Florida, The tugboat was completed in 1956, later named Falmouth, sold 2003, then Gowanus Bay. ST-2201 is a 65-foot, single-screw tug, powered with a 600-horsepower direct-reversing Atlas-Imperial diesel. ST-2201 was based in Fort Eustis until 2002. Tug design 3004, 72 GRT, 57 NRT, beam of 19.5 feet and draft of 8.5 feet.
- Seven Packard engines that will be used for the PT Boat restorations, 1,500 shp V12 M2500 gasoline engines,
  - Former boat:
- Patrol torpedo boat PT-728, a 70-foot Annapolis Yacht Yard, Annapolis, Maryland, completed 20 October 1945, was Endeavor II, acquired in 1967 by Fleet Obsolete, sold in 2012 to Liberty Aviation Museum. This was Iannucci first boat acquired in 2006, which he had restored.

== Gallery ==
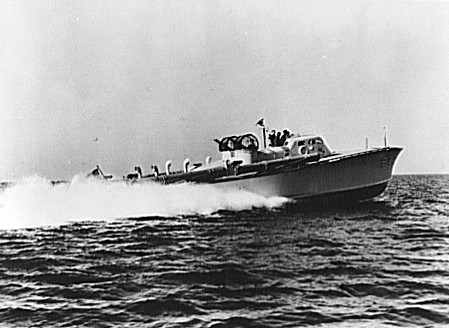
PT-48 sister PT boat PT-10 in 1941

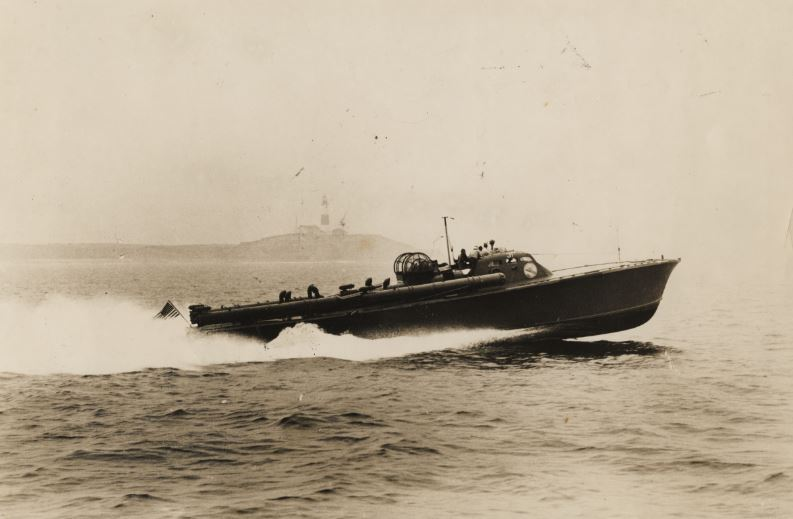
PT-48 sister boat PT-31 at Montauk Point, Long Island in 1941

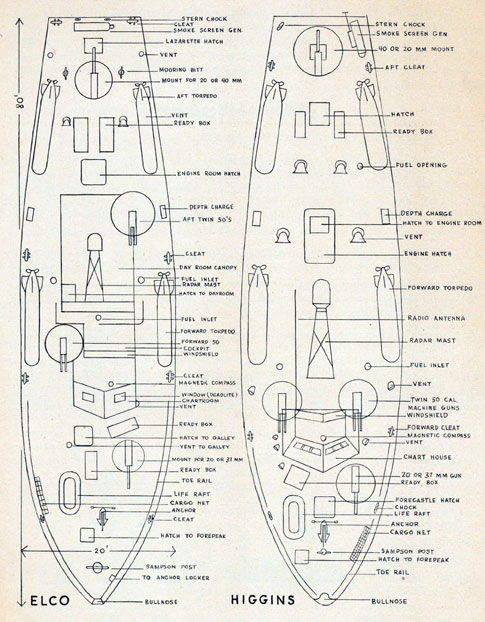
ELCO PT Boat US Navy July 1945

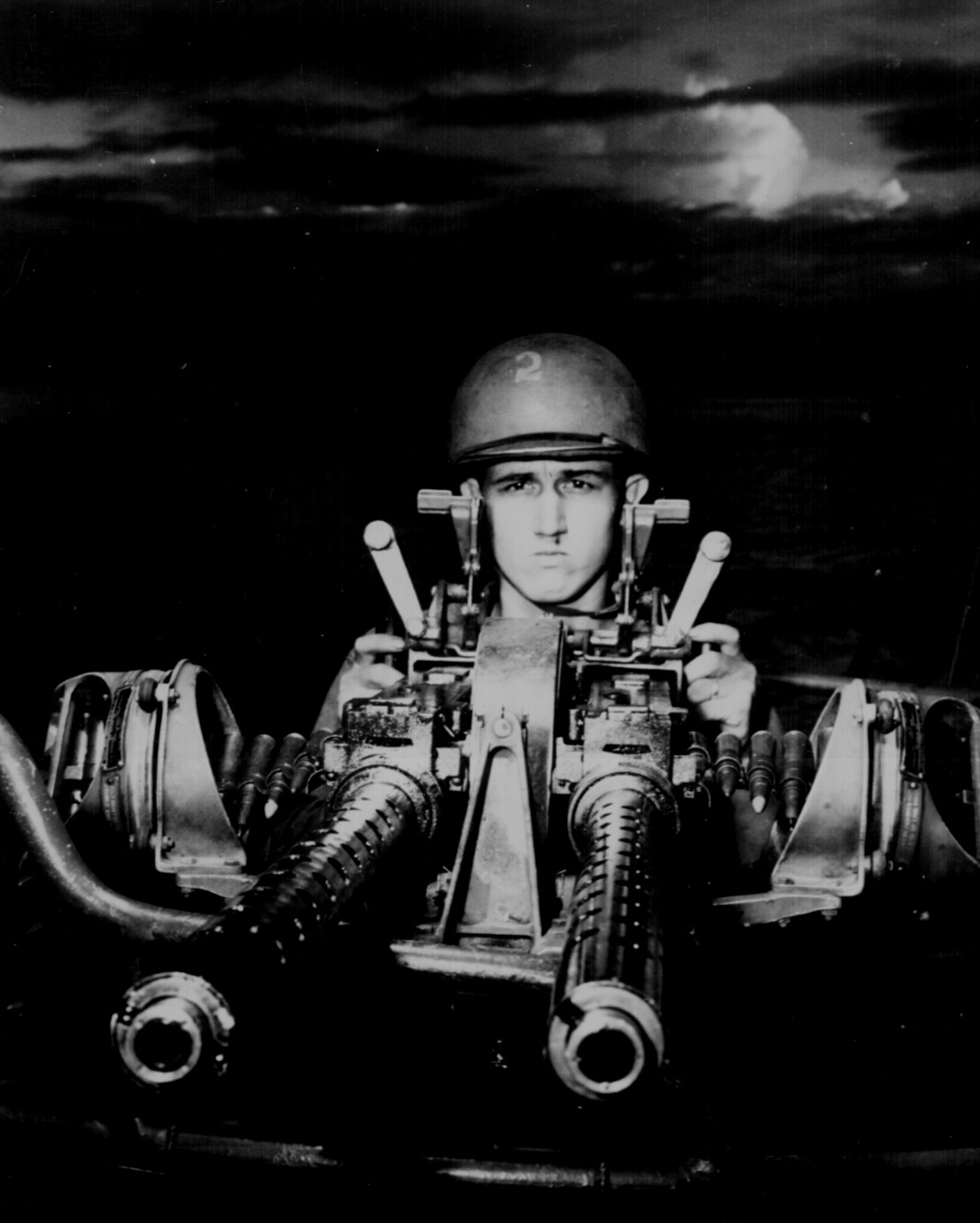
PT boat gunner mans a twin .50 caliber Browning M2 machine gun off New Guinea

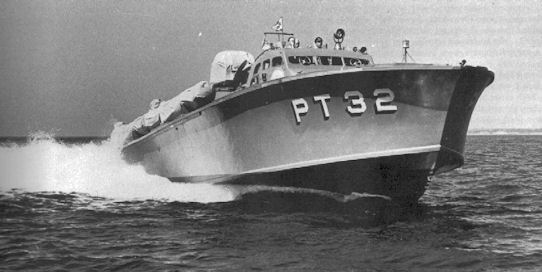
PT-48 sister boat PT-32

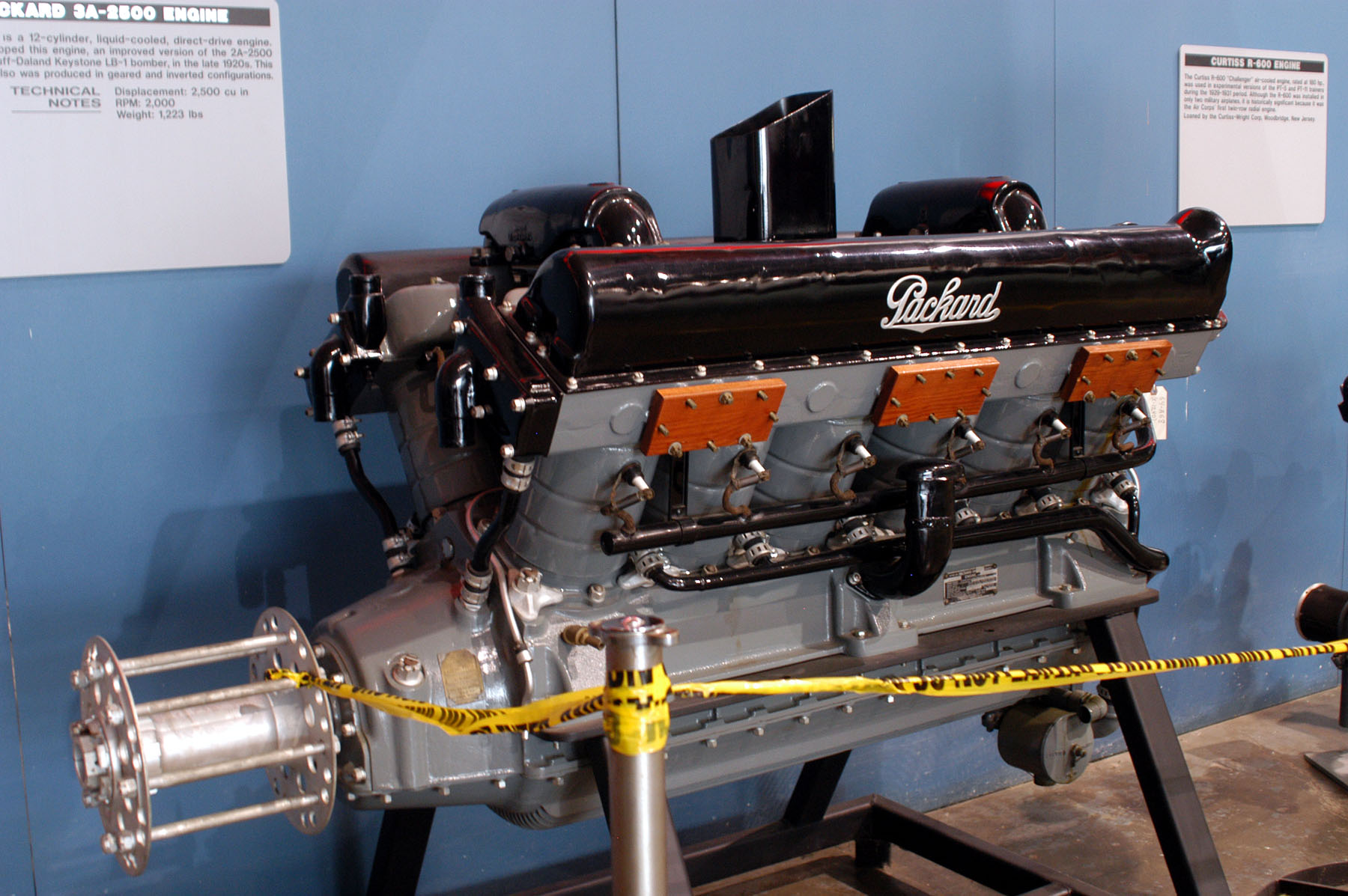
Packard 3A-2500 engine

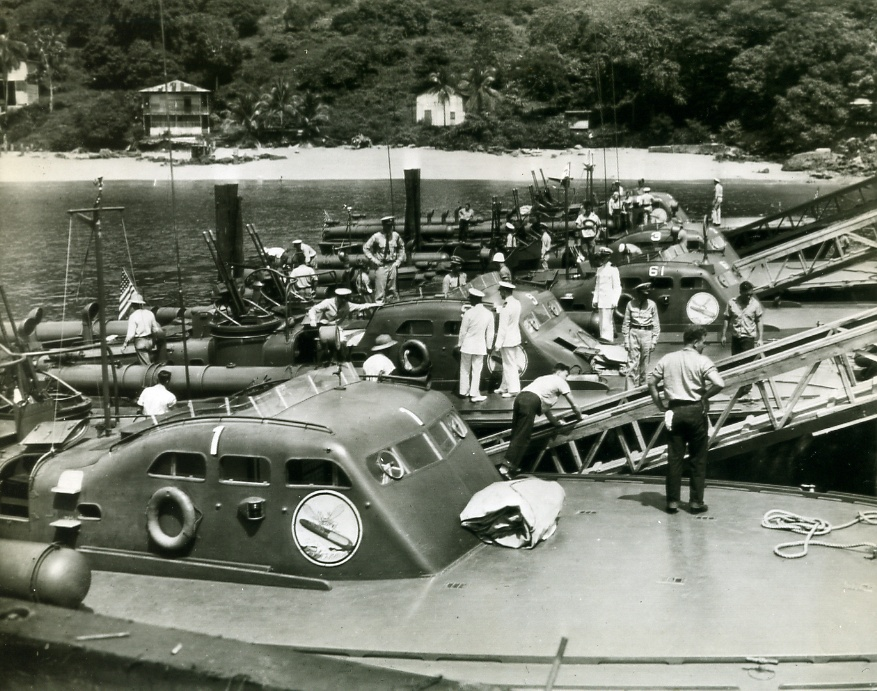
PT-46 (No. 1); PT-40 (No. 9); PT-61; PT-48 (No. 3) and PT-45 (No. 2) during commissioning ceremonies at the newly established PT Boat Base Taboga Island on 1 August 1942. To mislead possible Japanese spies in Panama, and presumably German agents in New York, the hull numbers displayed on the cabins were changed. The eleven boats of Motor Torpedo Boat Squadron Two were numbered 0 - 10.

== See also ==
- List of museum ships in North America
- List of patrol vessels of the United States Navy
- Clarence W. Spangenberger with Cornell Steamboat Company
