= Patrol torpedo boat PT-48 =

Torpedo boat of the U.S. Navy

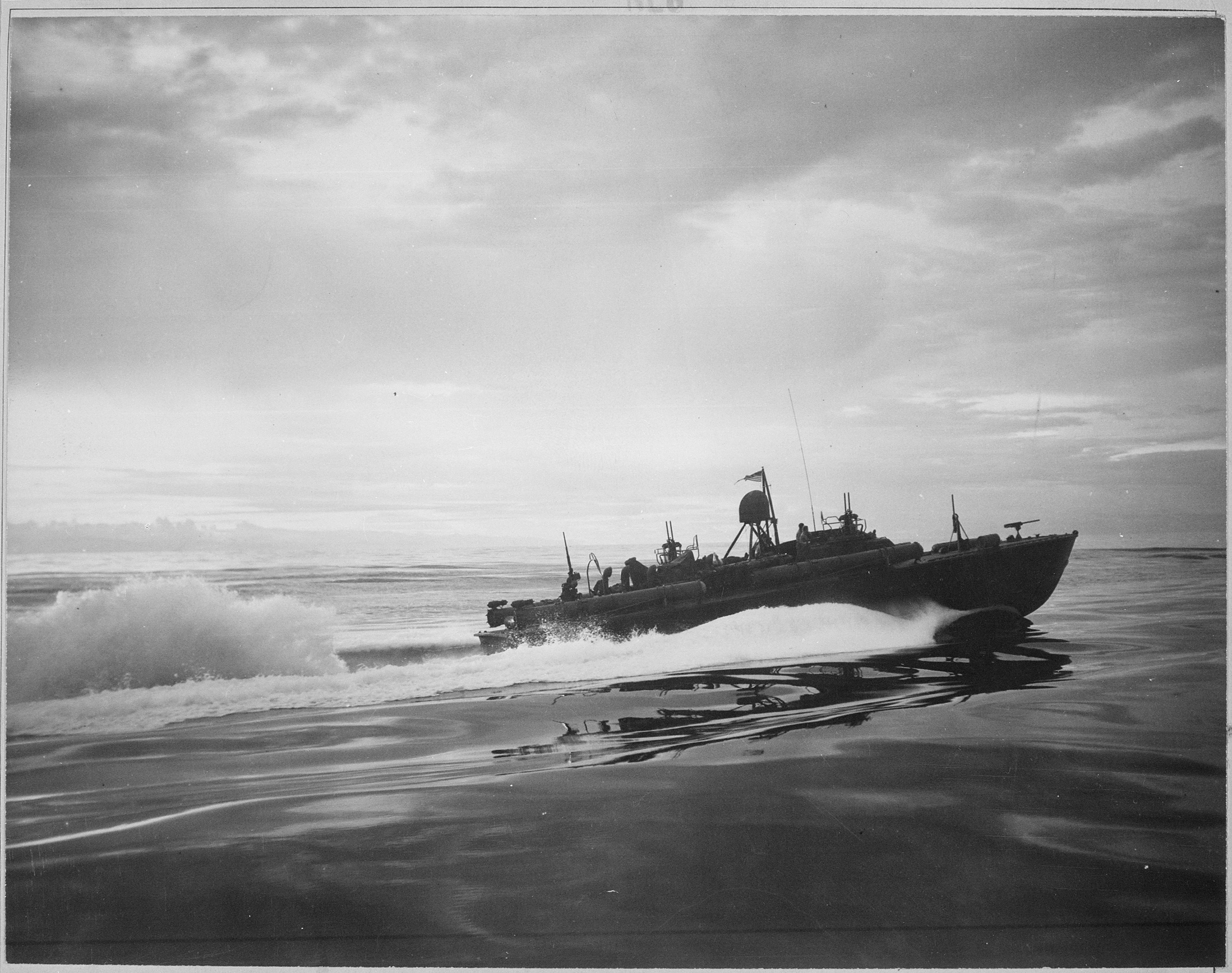
- Motor Torpedo Boat patrolling off coast of New Guinea

History

United States Navy
- Name: PT-48
- Builder: Electric Launch Company, Bayonne, New Jersey
- Laid down: 6 June 1941
- Launched: 21 August 1941
- Completed: 15 September 1941
- Nickname(s): "Prep Tom" - "Deuce"
- Fate: Museum ship at Fleet Obsolete in Kingston, New York
- Notes: Call Sign: Nan - William - King - Sugar

General characteristics
- Class & type: Elco 77-foot PT boat
- Displacement: 40 long tons (41 t)
- Length: 77 ft (23 m)
- Beam: 19 ft 11 in (6.07 m)
- Draft: 4 ft 6 in (1.37 m)
- Propulsion: 3 × 1,500 shp (1,119 kW) Packard V12 M2500 gasoline engines, 3 shafts
- Speed: 41 knots (76 km/h; 47 mph)
- Complement: 15
- Armament: 4 × 18 in (457 mm) torpedoes; 2 × twin .50 cal. M2 Browning machine guns in Dewandre turrets; 2 × .303 cal. Lewis guns

Patrol torpedo boat PT-48 is a PT-20-class motor torpedo boat of the United States Navy, built by the Electric Launch Company of Bayonne, New Jersey. PT-48 was laid down on 6 June 1941, launch on 8 July 1941, and was completed on 21 August 1941. PT-48 was assigned to Motor Torpedo Boat Squadron 2` (MTBRon 2) under the command of Lieutenant commander Earl S. Caldwell. PT-48 was part of 11 new 77-foot Elco boats that were assigned to the Panama Sea Frontier, to protect the Panama Canal, starting in December 1941. PT-48 was shipped to the Balboa, Canal Zone on the deck of USS Kitty Hawk (APV 1) at the Brooklyn Navy Yard, departing on 15 December 1941. PT-48 arrived at Balboa on 25 December 1941 and was transferred 27 July to Motor Torpedo Boat Squadron Three under the command of Lieutenant commander Alan R. Montgomery. PT-48 operated out of Balboa and Taboga, Panama. On Taboga Island was PT Boat Base Taboga Island. At its peak the PT Boat Base Taboga Island had 47 PT boats and 1,200 troops. After the crew was trained and the PT Boat completed sea trails, they would be sent to other US Naval Advance Bases. PT-48 commander, Lieutenant Lester H. Gamble USNR was awarded the Navy Cross and the Silver Star in 1943.

On 27 August 1942 PT-48 was loaded on the deck of the USS Tappahannock (AO-43) at Balboa and arrived at Naval Base Noumea at Noumea, New Caledonia on 27 September 1942. Naval Base Noumea became a major Naval training center. On 7 August 1944, PT-48 transferred to Motor Torpedo Boat Squadrons Training Center, in Melville, Rhode Island. At the training Center PT-48 was used to train repair personnel. On 14 October 1944 PT-48 was reclassified as a Small Boat. Bob and Marsha Hostetler of Fruitland Park, Florida, took ownership of PT-48 in 1999. In 2009, PT-48 was donated to Fleet Obsolete, Kingston, New York to be restored. PT-48 is one of the few surviving 77-foot Elco boats.

== Gallery ==
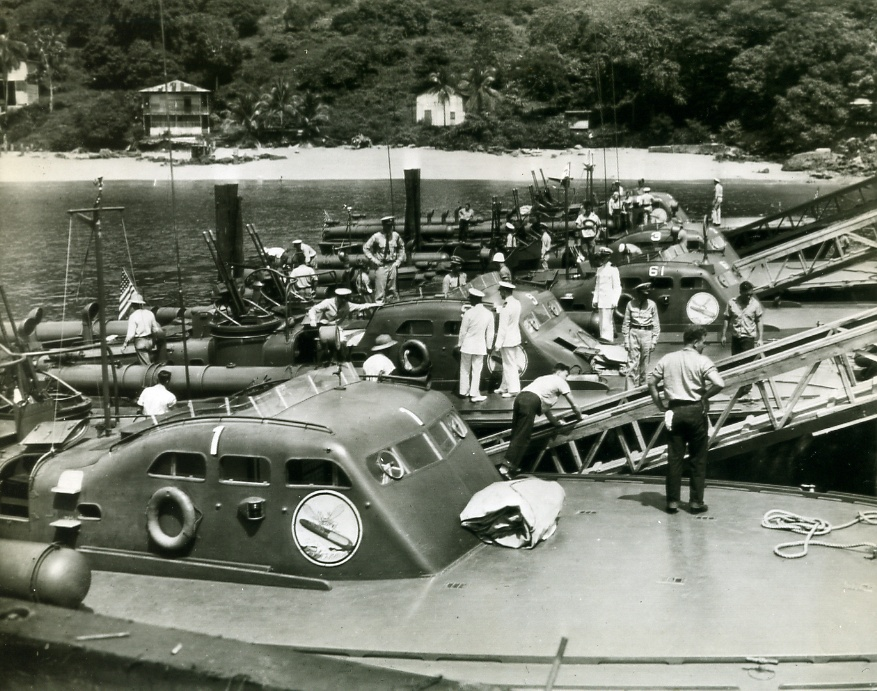
PT-46 (No. 1); PT-40 (No. 9); PT-61; PT-48 (No. 3) and PT-45 (No. 2) during commissioning ceremonies at the newly established PT Boat Base Taboga Island on 1 August 1942. To mislead possible Japanese spies in Panama, and presumably German agents in New York, the hull numbers displayed on the cabins were changed. The eleven boats of Motor Torpedo Boat Squadron Two were numbered 0 - 10.

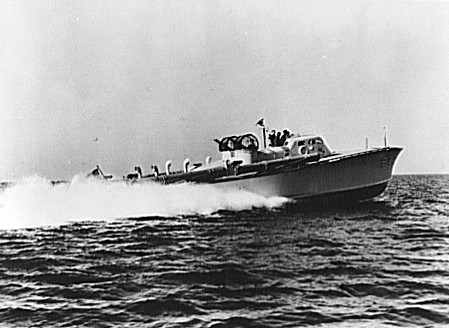
PT-48 sister PT boat PT-10 in 1941

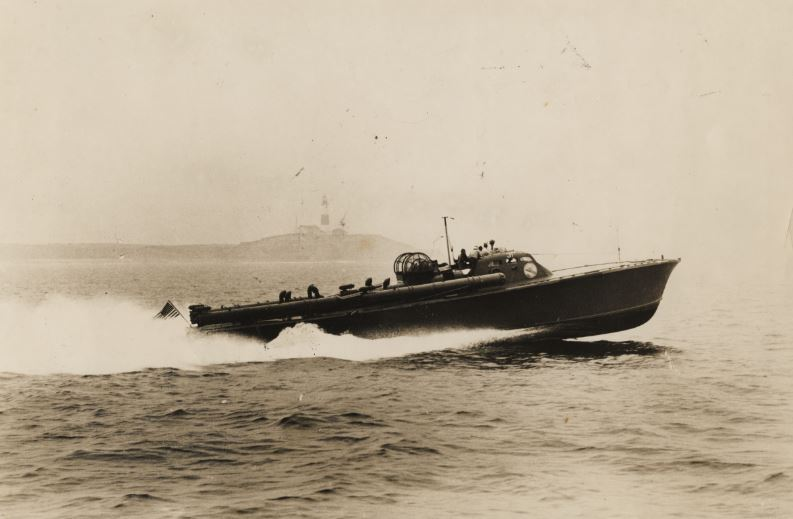
PT-48 sister boat PT-31 at Montauk Point, Long Island in 1941

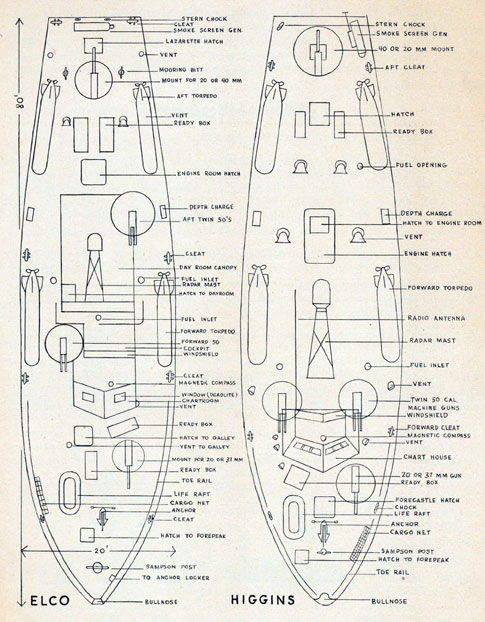
ELCO PT Boat US Navy July 1945

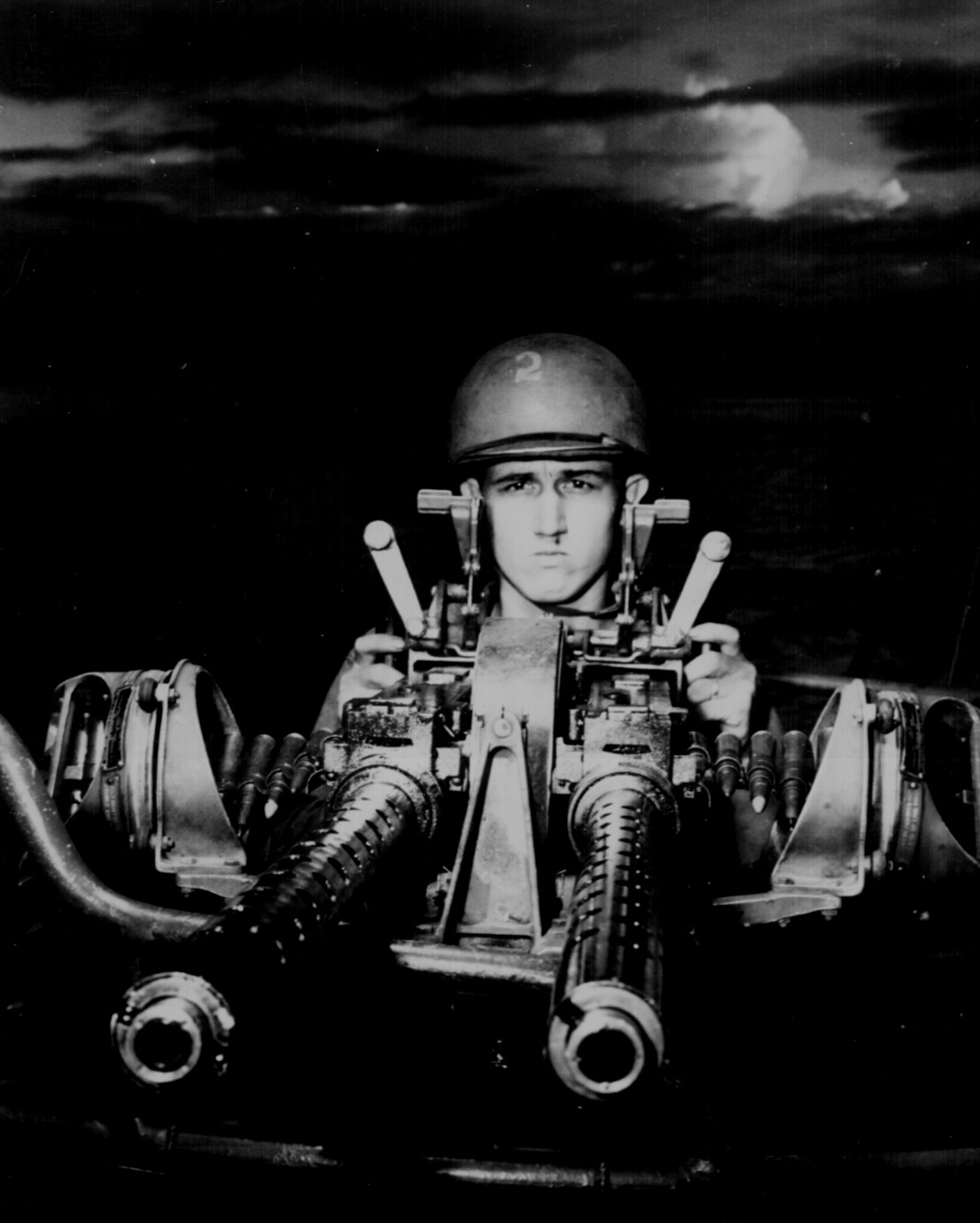
PT boat gunner mans a twin .50 caliber Browning M2 machine gun off New Guinea

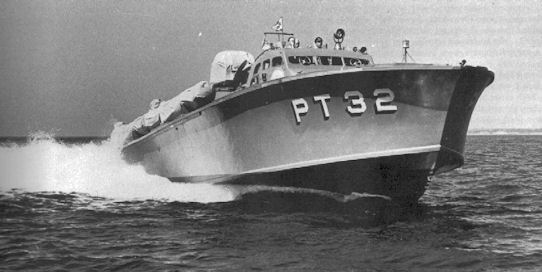
PT-48 sister boat PT-32

== See also ==
- List of museum ships in North America
- PT-59
- PT-42
- PT-29
- PT-32
