= Cornell Steamboat Company =

Historical place in Rondout, New York, United States

Cornell Steamboat Company Building
- Cornell Steamboat Company Ferryboat Transport at Rondout dock, NY, in 1910 with Cornell Steamboat Company tugboat C.W. Morse and other Cornell tugs in winter ice.

- Location within New York Location within the United States
- 41°55′12″N 73°58′44″W
- Location: 108 East Strand, Kingston, New York, 12401

History
- Built: 1875, 176 years ago

Site notes
- Architectural style: Brick
- Governing body: Fleet Obsolete

The Cornell Steamboat Company was founded by Thomas Cornell (1814–1890) in Rondout, New York in the late 1840s, as a major passenger ship and cargo company. Thomas Cornell was President of Cornell Steamboat Company from 1865 to 1870.

== Buildings ==
Cornell Shops Building has three sections, each built at different times. The center section of the building, a brick building, was built in about 1875. The main section brick building was built in 1901. The newest addition the, concrete block building was built in 1961. Cornell used the 1875 building for its work shops. Cornell had a complex of buildings on the Hudson River riverfront. The Cornell Shops Building and the boiler shop, now the Steel House Restaurant (100 Rondout Lndg, Kingston) are the only two buildings of the complex remaining.

== Activity ==
Cornell Steamboat Company rebuild entire boats, engines, and boiler in the Cornell complex. Thomas Cornell arrived at Rondout in 1837 and started a shipping company with his sloop. Cornell transported coal on the Delaware and Hudson Canal. Cornell also transported wood, stone, plaster, tanning bark, animal hides, millstones, glass, charcoal, lead, and stoneware. Cornell Steamboat Company also operated a fleet of river tugboats. By 1900 Cornell was operating 60 tugs and ended his passenger ship service. Cornell also had a ferry service between Rhinecliff and Kingston Point/Rondout, the Kingston-Rhinecliff ferry. He has two ferries in his service the Transport (1881) and Kingston (1930). The ferry ended in 1957 after the opening of the Kingston-Rhinecliff Bridge. Transport ran on the ferry line from 1881 to 1938. Cornell built and ran railroad lines on both sides of the Hudson River, including the Kingston City trolley system. The Kingston Point station was the largest and busy trolley station. Cornell was a partner is starting two banks (Rondout Savings Bank and a commercial bank) and the large Catskill Mountain hotel. Cornell served two terms in Congress from March 4, 1867, to March 3, 1869, and from March 4, 1881, to March 3, 1883. S.D. Coykendall (1837-1913, Samuel Decker Coykendall), was son-in-law of Thomas Cornell and second president of the Cornell Steamboat Company. Mary Augusta Cornell (1842-1919) was Thomas Cornell Daughter.

== Closure ==
In 1958, Cornell closed and sold its boats to New York Trap Rock Corporation. Some of the tugs operated by Cornell were: Knickerbocker, Mohawk, Rockland County,Belle, C.W. Morse, J.G. Rose, R.G. Townsend, and Thomas Cornell. The 1875 work shop building now houses the Fleet Obsolete since 2005. Fleet Obsolete restores rare Torpedo boat, PT Boats of the U.S. Navy. The Hudson River Maritime Museum houses many the Cornell Steamboat Company historical records.

== Gallery ==
Cornell Steamboat Company boiler house in 1890, later became the Ole Savannah restaurant on the Hudson River riverfront.

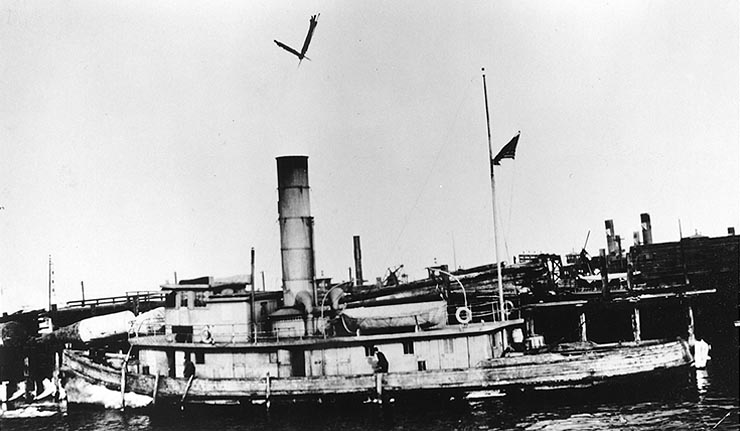
Knickerbocker, a 1873 Cornell Steamboat Company tug acquired by U.S. Navy for World War I service on 5 May 1917.

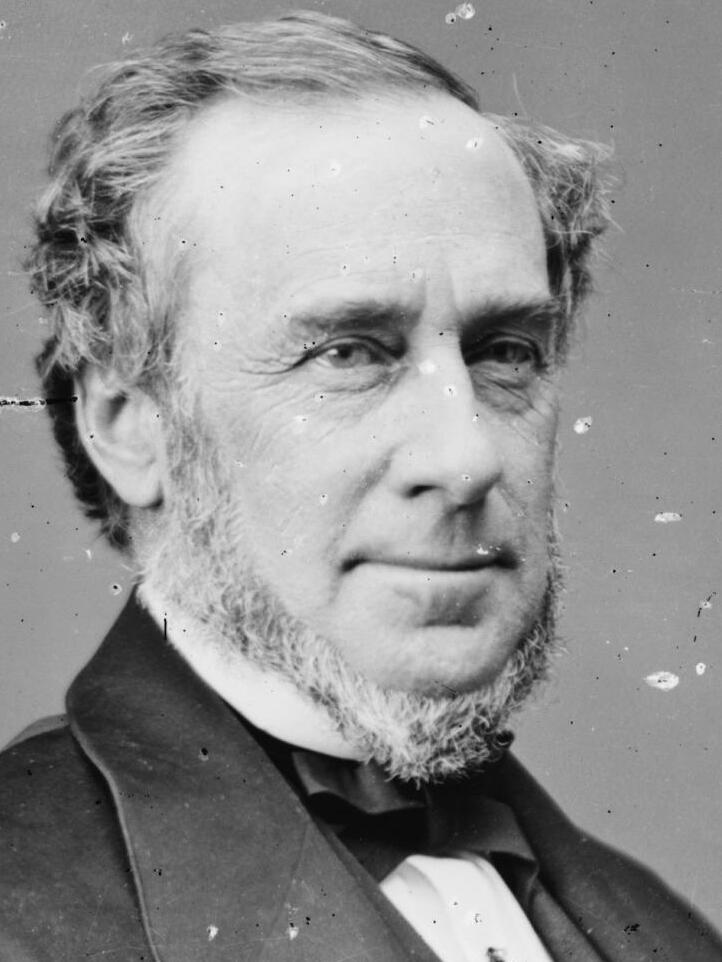
Thomas C. Cornell founder of the Cornell Steamboat Company

Kingston City trolley system in 1906 at Kingston Point Park, owned by Cornell Steamboat Company, run by S.D. Coykendall, son-in-law of founder Thomas Cornell and second president of the Cornell Steamboat Company.

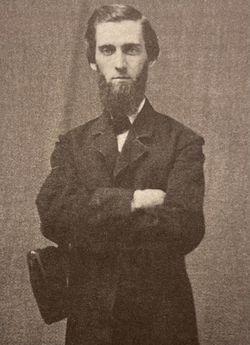
Samuel Decker Coykendall (1837-1913) in 1889, was son-in-law of Thomas Cornell and second president of the Cornell Steamboat Company and Kingston City trolley system

Cornell Steamboat Company's Steamboat Thomas Cornel run up on Danskammer Point on March 27, 1882.

Cornell Steamboat Company tug John H. Cordts at Cornell docks on Rondout Creek and the Hudson River

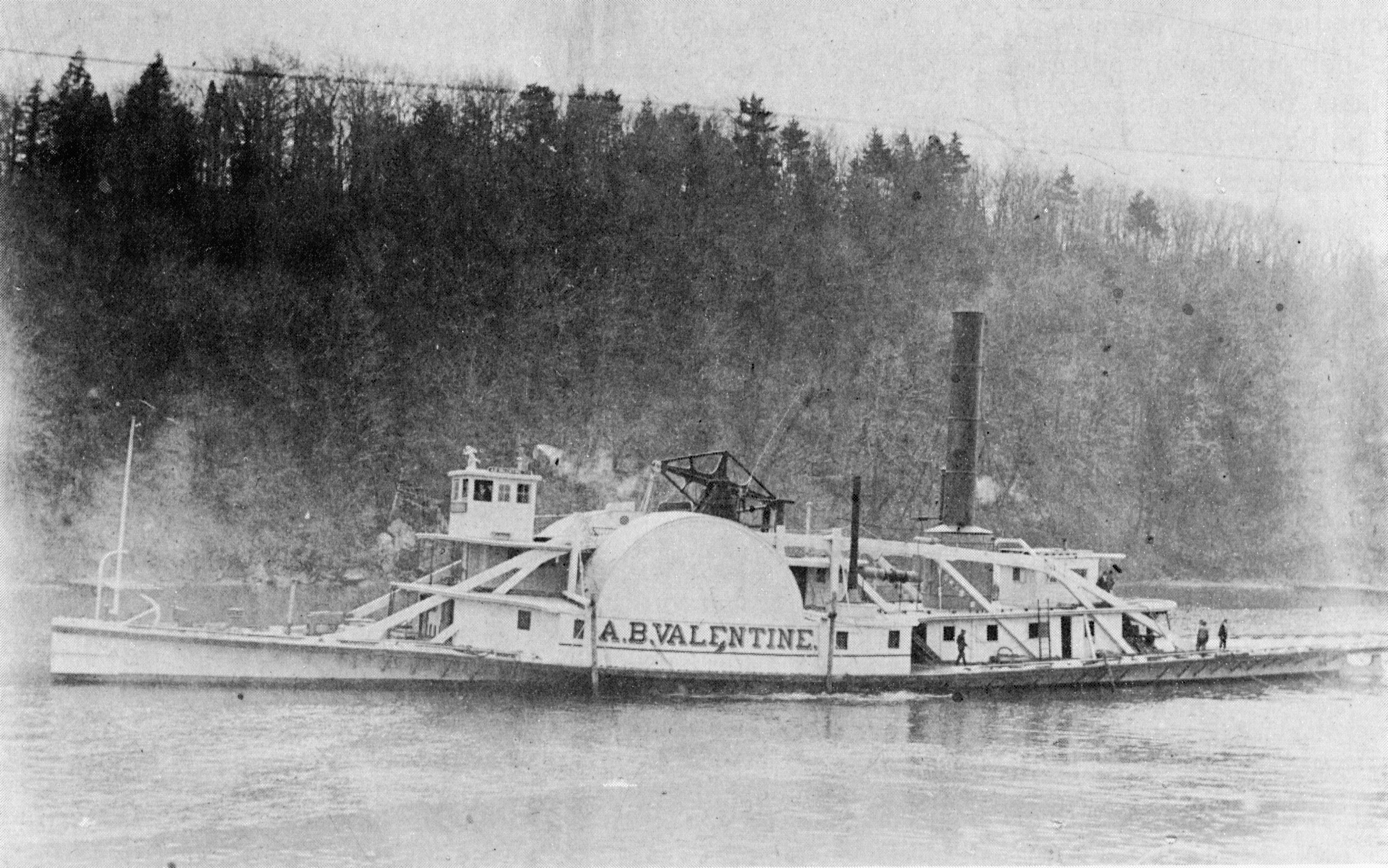
Cornell Steamboat Company Santa Claus steamboat

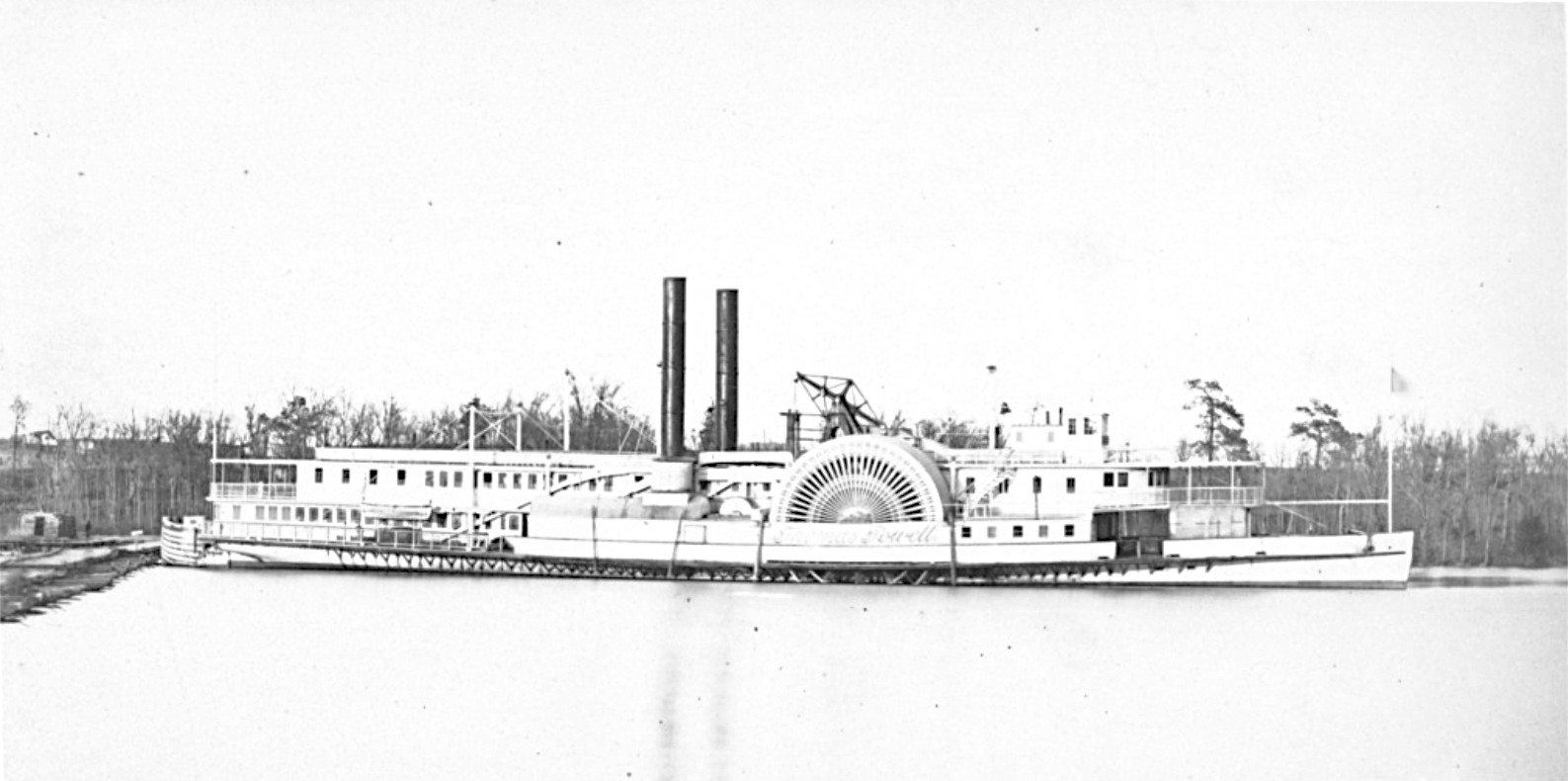
Thomas Powell (1846 steamboat) at Broadway Landing

== See also ==
- Clarence W. Spangenberger with Cornell Steamboat Company
- Ulster and Delaware Railroad
