= USS SC-521 =

Coordinates: 11°03′S 164°50′E

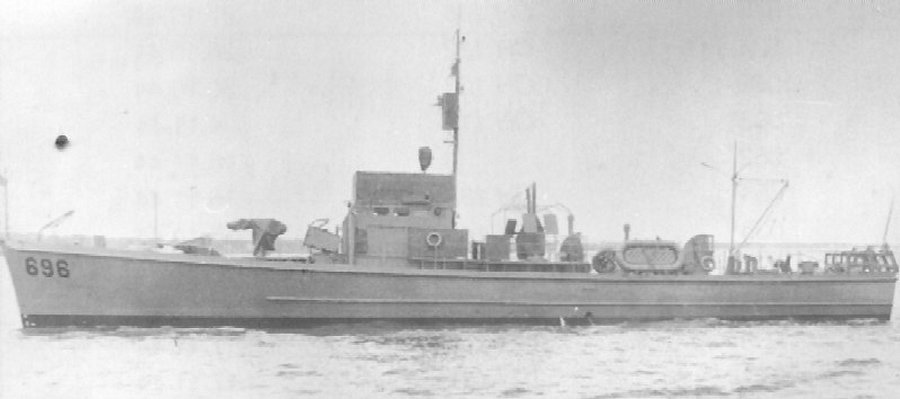
- USS SC-696, a fellow SC-497-class submarine chaser

History

United States
- Name: SC-521
- Laid down: 5 May 1941
- Launched: 1 February 1942
- Commissioned: 15 April 1942
- Fate: Foundered 10 July 1945

General characteristics
- Class & type: SC-497-class submarine chaser
- Displacement: 148 tons
- Length: 110 ft 10 in (33.8 m)
- Beam: 17 ft (5.2 m)
- Height: 10 ft 10 in (3.3 m)
- Draft: 6 ft 6 in (2.0 m)
- Propulsion: 2 × 880 bhp (660 kW) General Motors 8-268A diesel engines; 1 × Snow and Knobstedt single reduction gear; 2 × shafts
- Speed: 15.6 knots (28.9 km/h; 18.0 mph)
- Complement: 28
- Armament: 1 × 40 mm gun mount; 2 × .50 cal (12.7 mm) machine guns; 2 × DCP Y guns; 2 × DCT

USS SC-521 was a SC-497-class submarine chaser that served in the United States Navy during World War II. She was laid down on 5 May 1941 by the Annapolis Yacht Yard, Inc. in Annapolis, Maryland and launched on 1 February 1942. She was commissioned on 15 April 1942. She foundered on 10 July 1945 off Santa Cruz, Solomon Islands.
