= Annapolis Yacht Yard =

Marine service provider and shipbuilder in Annapolis, Maryland

- Industry: Shipbuilding; Marine repair
- Founded: January 1937; 89 years ago
- Founder: Chris Nelson
- Defunct: 1947
- Fate: Sold
- Successor: John Trumpy & Sons
- Headquarters: Annapolis, Maryland, USA
- Area served: US Navy and Annapolis
- Products: PT Boats, sub chasers, yachts
- Services: Boat building and repair

Annapolis Yacht Yard was founded in 1937 by Nelson-Reid, Inc, naval architects and yacht brokers in New York City. Annapolis Yacht Yard was across the Severn River from the Annapolis Naval Academy.

== History ==
Annapolis Yacht Yard was a major builder of sub chasers and PT boats during World War II. In 1947, after the death of Chris Nelson, Annapolis Yacht Yard sold to John Trumpy & Sons. The site today is called the Yacht Yard. Patrol torpedo boat PT-728 built by Annapolis Yacht Yard is a rare surviving PT boats at the Liberty Aviation Museum. On 1 April 1941, Annapolis Yacht Yard and Chris Nelson, its president, was give its first contract to build two 110-foot submarine chasers. BPT are Motor Torpedo Boat built for Great Britain, renamed HM MTB boats, a Vosper & Company design. In 1962, Annapolis yard was destroyed in a fire, in 1974 John Trumpy & Sons closed. Nelson, graduated from MIT in 1918 with a degree in naval architecture. Nelson designed the yachts that Reid and Almen sold to wealthy New York businessmen during the 1920s and 1930s. Annapolis Yacht Yard first customer was James Roosevelt, son of President Franklin Roosevelt, he had his yacht the Sewauna overhauled in the boatyard in July 1937. Nelson most popular model designed was the American Cruiser, a 60-foot twin diesel motor yacht.

== Boats ==
Annapolis Yacht Yard built for World War II:

- PT boats BPT-2 to BPT-68, PT-400 to PT-429, and PT-661 to PT-730
- Submarine chaser SC-521 to SC-691 and SC-1309 to SC 1314
  - Boat built:
- USS SC-521

== Chance Boatyard ==
- Chance Boatyard (Annapolis Yacht Yard in 1937)
- U.S. National Register of Historic Places
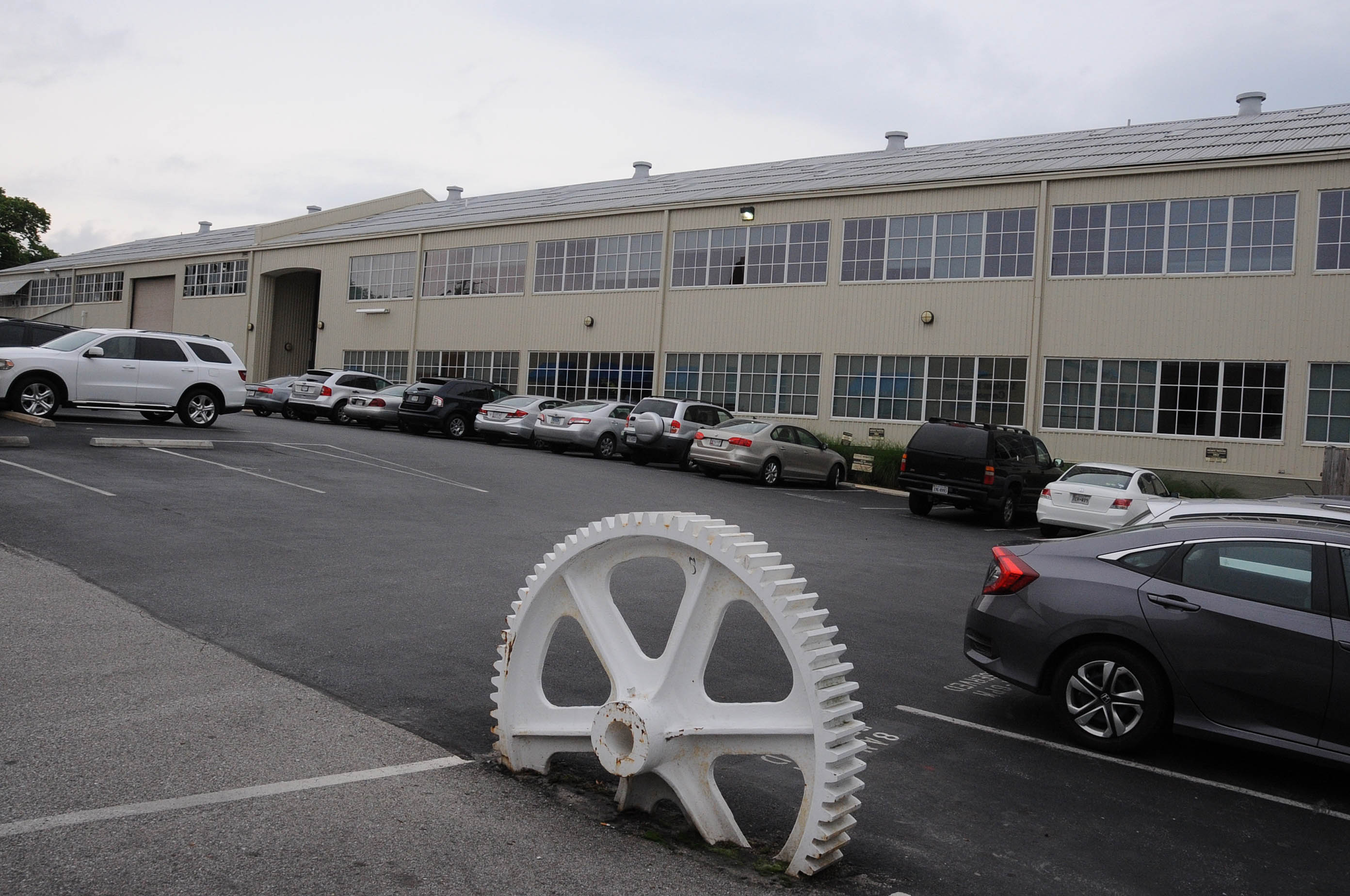
- Main building

- Location within Maryland Location within the United States
- Location: 222 Severn Ave., Annapolis, Maryland
- Coordinates: 38°58′22″N 76°28′54″W
- Built: 1913
- Architect: Harold M. Simmons
- NRHP reference No.: 99000421
- Added to NRHP: April 14, 1999

The site of Annapolis Yacht Yard was the Chance Boatyard when Chris Nelson acquired the Chance Boatyard for the Annapolis Yacht Yard. The site has become a U.S. National Register of Historic Places.

== Gallery ==
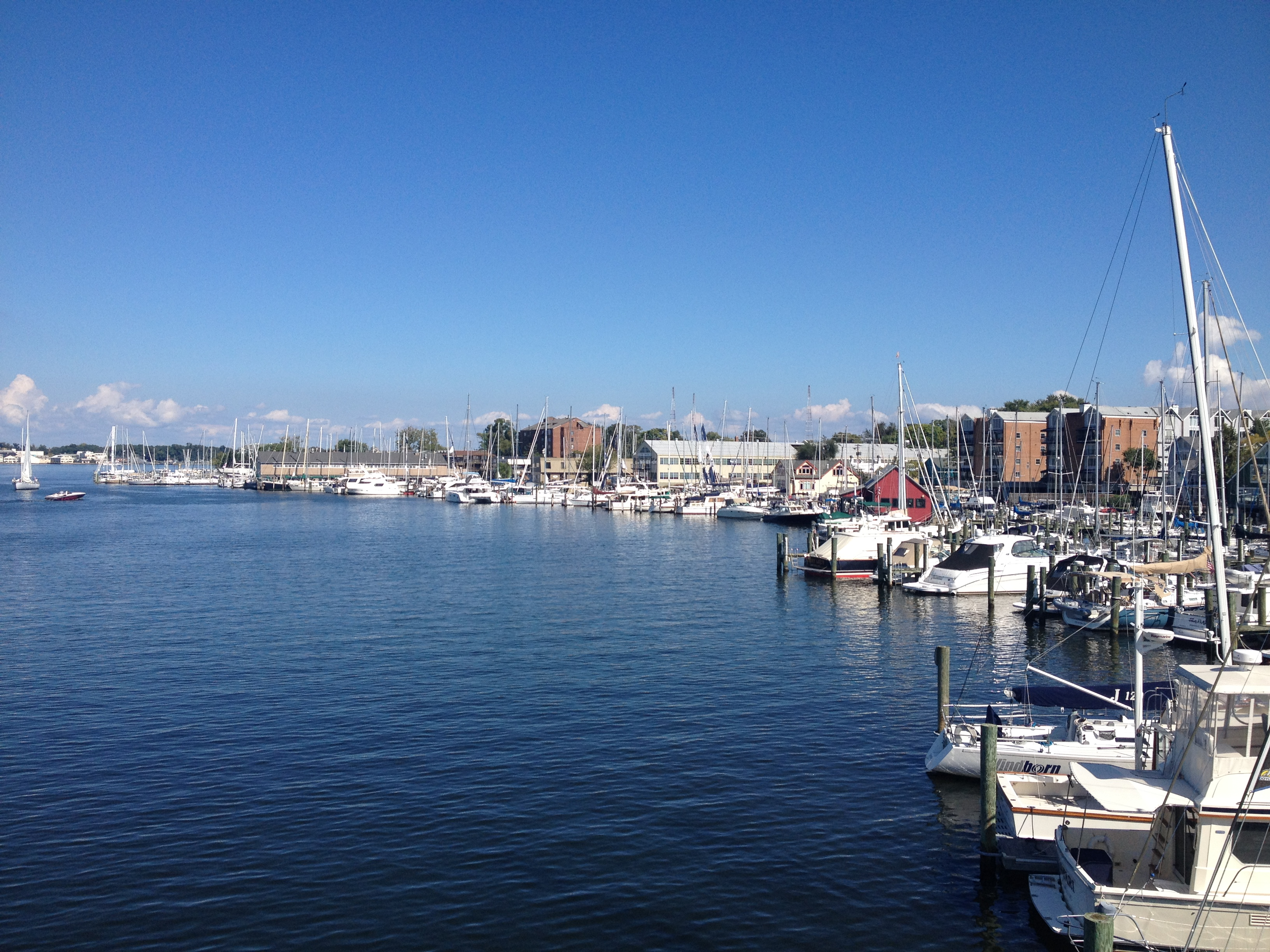
Yacht Yard view from Compromise Street Bridge

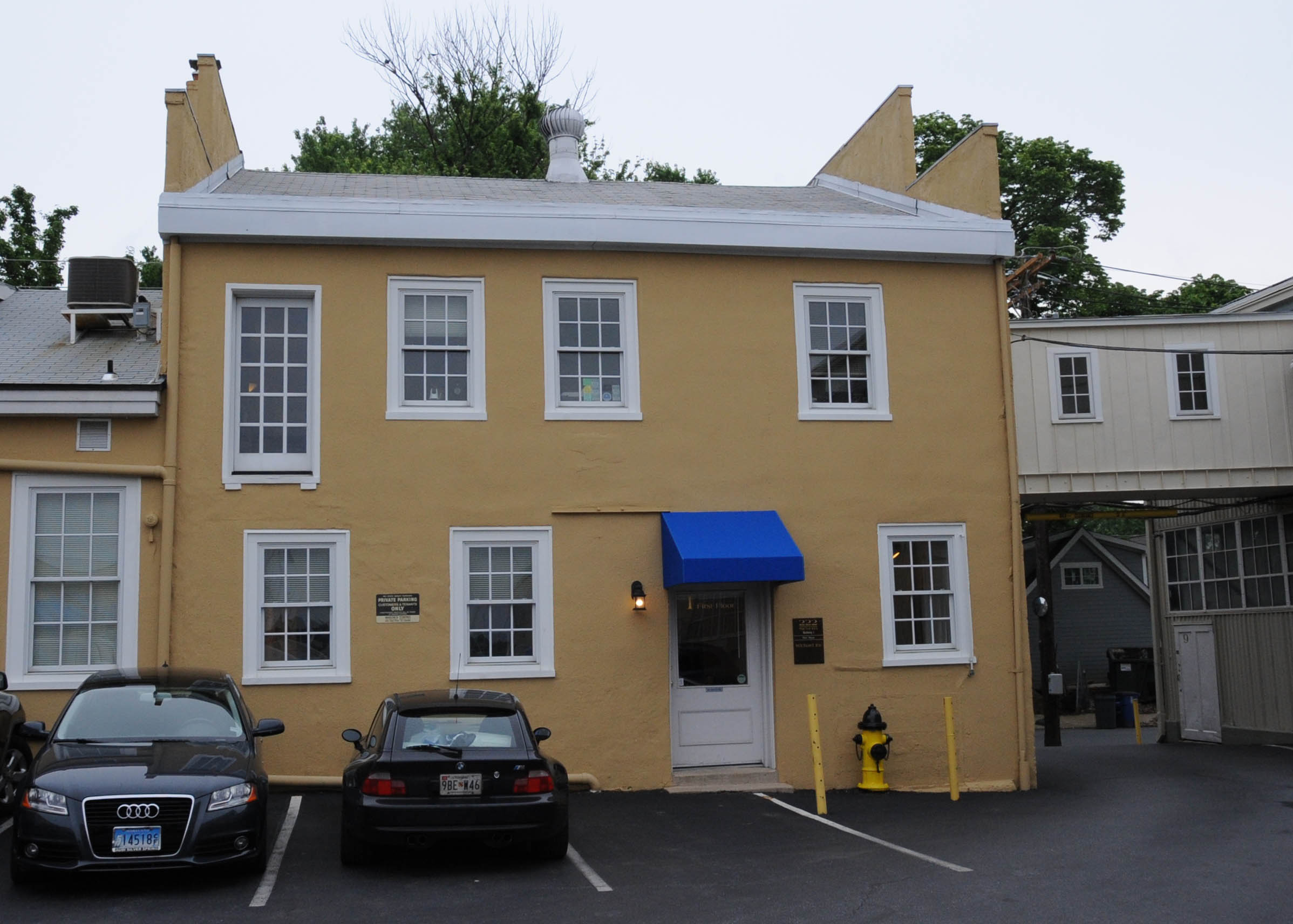
Yacht Yard older building

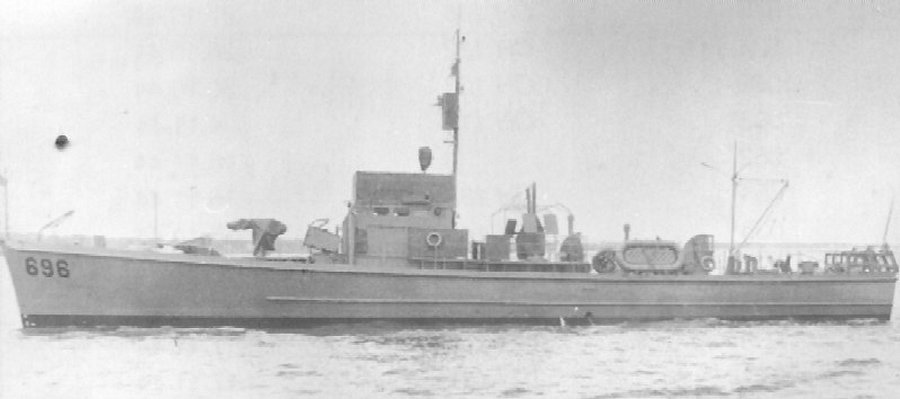
USS SC-521 built by Annapolis Yacht Yard

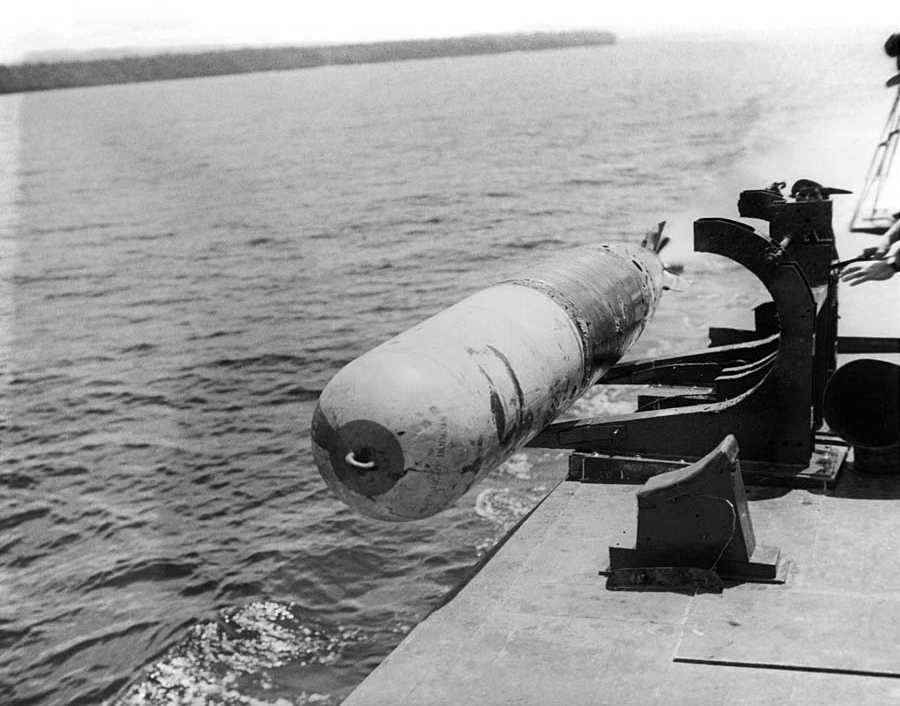
Mk 13 torpedo launch from PT boat in 1943

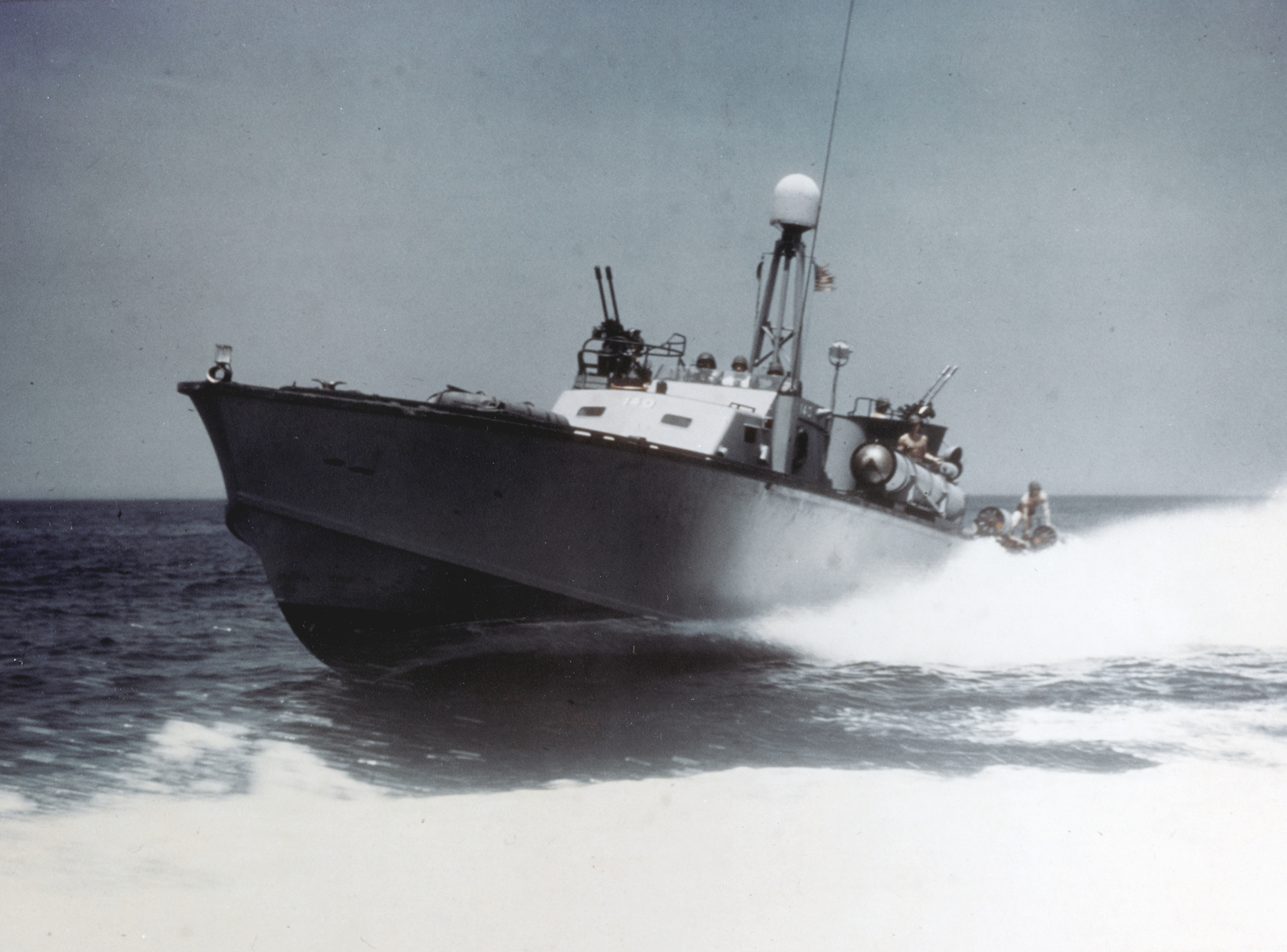
PT boat in 1943

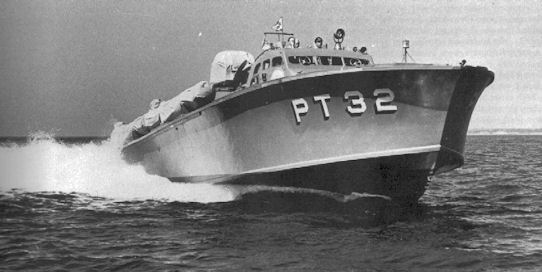
PT Boat

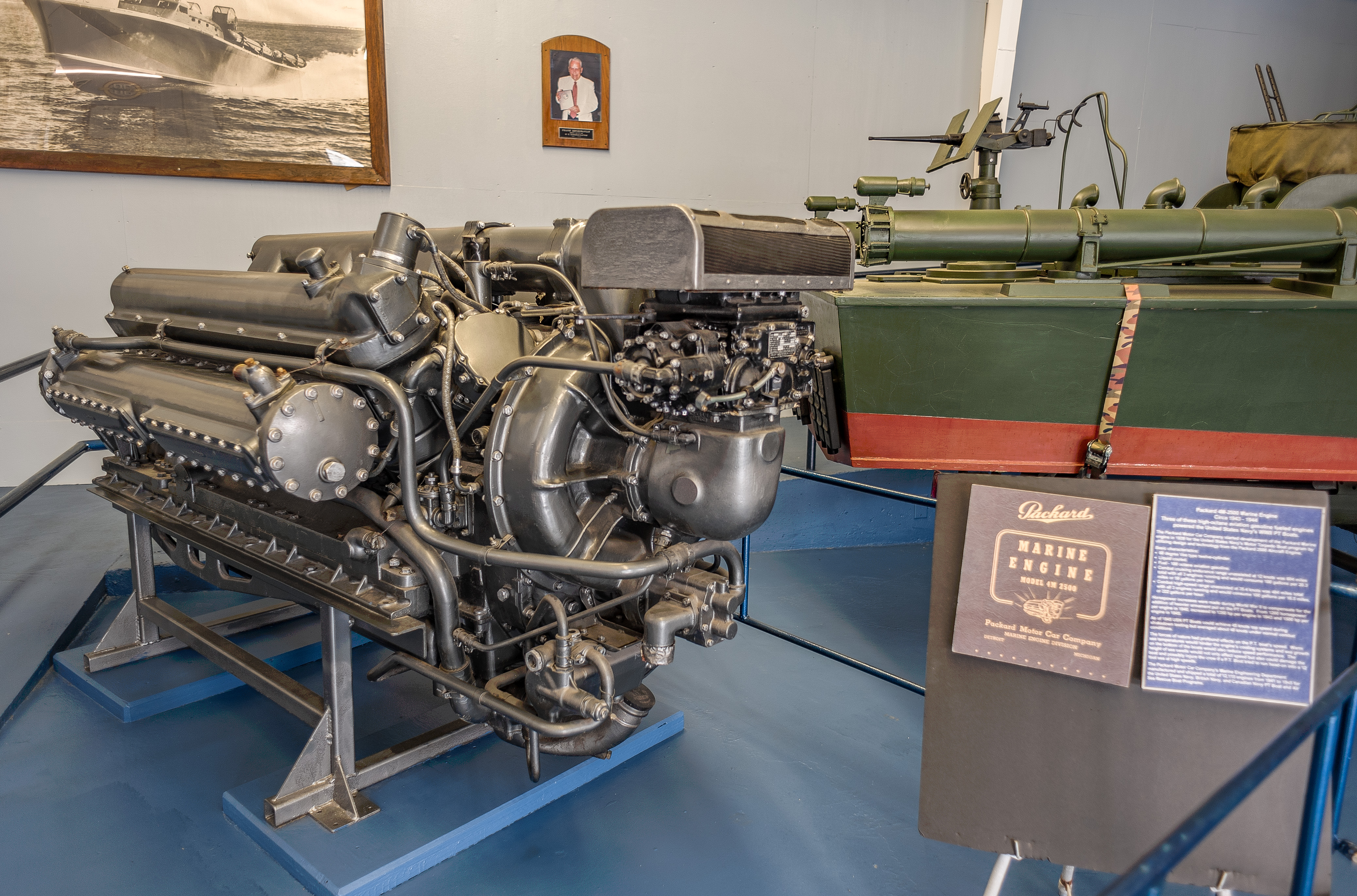
Packard Marine Engine M4 2500 at Battleship Cove in Falls River, Massachusetts use in PT boats
