= USS Knickerbocker =

Minesweeper of the United States Navy

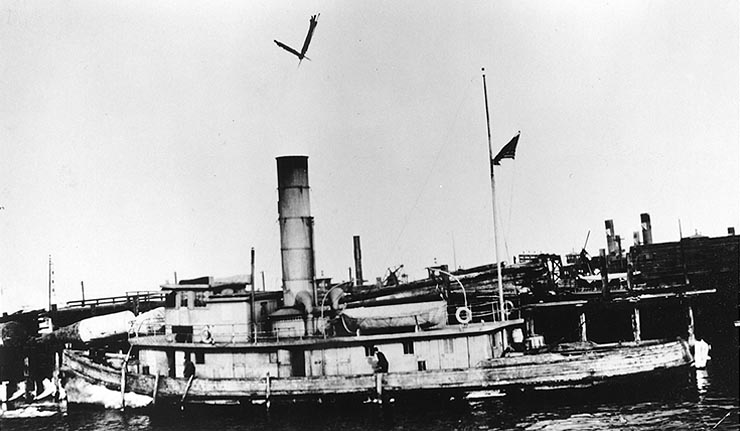
- Knickerbocker around the time the U.S. Navy acquired her for World War I service on 5 May 1917.

History

United States
- Name: USS Knickerbocker
- Namesake: Previous name retained
- Builder: Neafie & Levy, Philadelphia, Pennsylvania
- Completed: 1873
- Acquired: Leased 2 May 1917; Purchased 13 September 1917
- Commissioned: 22 September 1917
- Stricken: 16 March 1918
- Reinstated: April 1918
- Stricken: 15 February 1919
- Decommissioned: 18 February 1919
- Fate: Sold 18 February 1919
- Notes: Operated as commercial tug Knickerbocker 1873–1917 and from 1919

General characteristics
- Type: Patrol vessel
- Tonnage: 123 gross register tons
- Length: 110 ft (34 m)
- Beam: 23 ft 11 in (7.29 m)
- Draft: 11 ft (3.4 m)
- Propulsion: Steam engine
- Speed: 9 knots

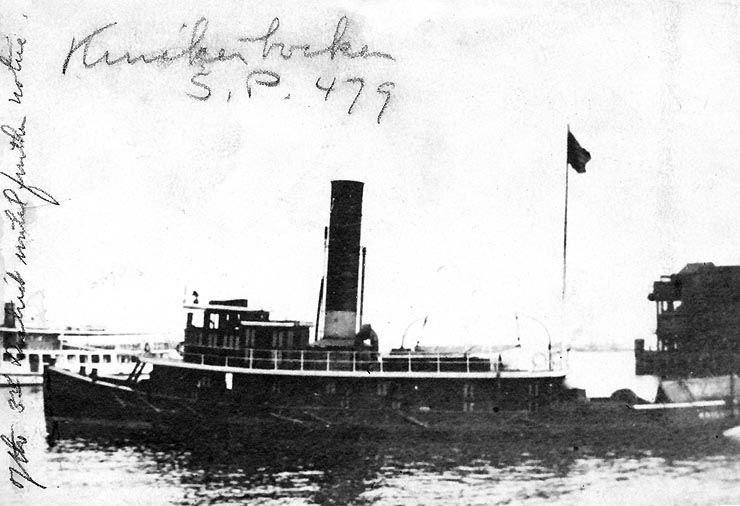
Knickerbocker as a commercial tug sometime between 1873 and 1917.

USS Knickerbocker (SP-479), was a United States Navy tug, minesweeper, and dispatch ship in commission from 1917 to 1919.

== Construction and acquisition ==
Knickerbocker was built as a commercial tug of the same name in 1873 by Neafie & Levy at Philadelphia, Pennsylvania. She was rebuilt in 1904.

The U.S. Navy leased Knickerbocker from her owner, the Cornell Steamboat Company of New York City, on 2 May 1917 for use during World War I and enrolled her in the Navy Coast Defense Reserve, then purchased her outright from Cornell Steamboat on 13 September 1917. She was commissioned at New York City as USS Knickerbocker (SP-479) on 22 September 1917 .

== Operational history ==
Assigned to the 3rd Naval District, Knickerbocker operated on the Hudson River and in New York Harbor as a minesweeper, tug, and dispatch ship.

Though Knickerbocker was ordered stricken from the Navy List on 14 March 1918 due to her poor material condition and accordingly was stricken on 16 March 1918, a scarcity of tugs resulted in her retention for harbor duty, and she was reinstated on the Navy List in April 1918.

On 30 December 1918, Knickerbocker was assigned as tender to the training and guard ship USS Amphitrite and served as a dispatch ship.

== Disposal ==
Knickerbocker was decommissioned on 18 February 1919 and was sold the same day to Francis J. McDonald of Ardmore, Pennsylvania.
