= Lumbari Island =

Island in Solomon Islands

Coordinates: 8°24.182′S 157°18.615′E

Lumbari Island is a small island off the north coast of Rendova Island in Western Province, Solomon Islands.

It was the base of operations for PT boats such as John F. Kennedy's PT 109

== See also ==
- Western Province topics
- 08°24.182'S, 157°18.615'E.
