= Clarence W. Spangenberger =

Clarence W. Spangenberger (December 9, 1905 – October 21, 2008) was the last president of the Cornell Steamboat Company, whose more than sixty vessels made it the largest tugboat company in the United States.

== Early life and education ==
Spangenberger was born in Kingston, New York, on December 9, 1905. His parents both earned their incomes serving the shipyard workers and boatmen in Rondout, New York, with his mother selling bread and his father working as a barber. Spangenberger graduated from New York University, majoring in business.

== Career ==
He first worked as a sales representative for the Standard Oil Company, before being hired in 1933 by the Cornell Steamboat Company, a firm whose history dated back to 1847. He started in the accounts-receivable department and later supervised the firm's engineers, firemen and oilers.

Spangenberger pushed the firm's management to convert to oil power instead of steam. With the change, the company's tugboats could push twenty-one barges that were grouped three across, rather than having all twenty-one barges towed end-to-end. He was selected by the firm's trustees to become the head of Cornell in December 1954, at a time when trucks and railroads were changing the dynamics of the shipping business. His efforts to revive the company included dismissing hundreds of employees, all of whom he notified in person.

New York Trap Rock Corporation, a producer of crushed stone that was the business's largest customer, acquired Cornell in 1958, in a merger that combined two of the Hudson River Valley's oldest companies. The Cornell Steamboat Company name was retained and Spangenberger remained in charge of the towing division. Even with more powerful tugboats and other efficiencies, Cornell went out of business in 1963.

== Death ==
He died at age 102 in Rhinebeck, New York, on October 21, 2008.
