= USS Tappahannock =

Oiler of the United States Navy

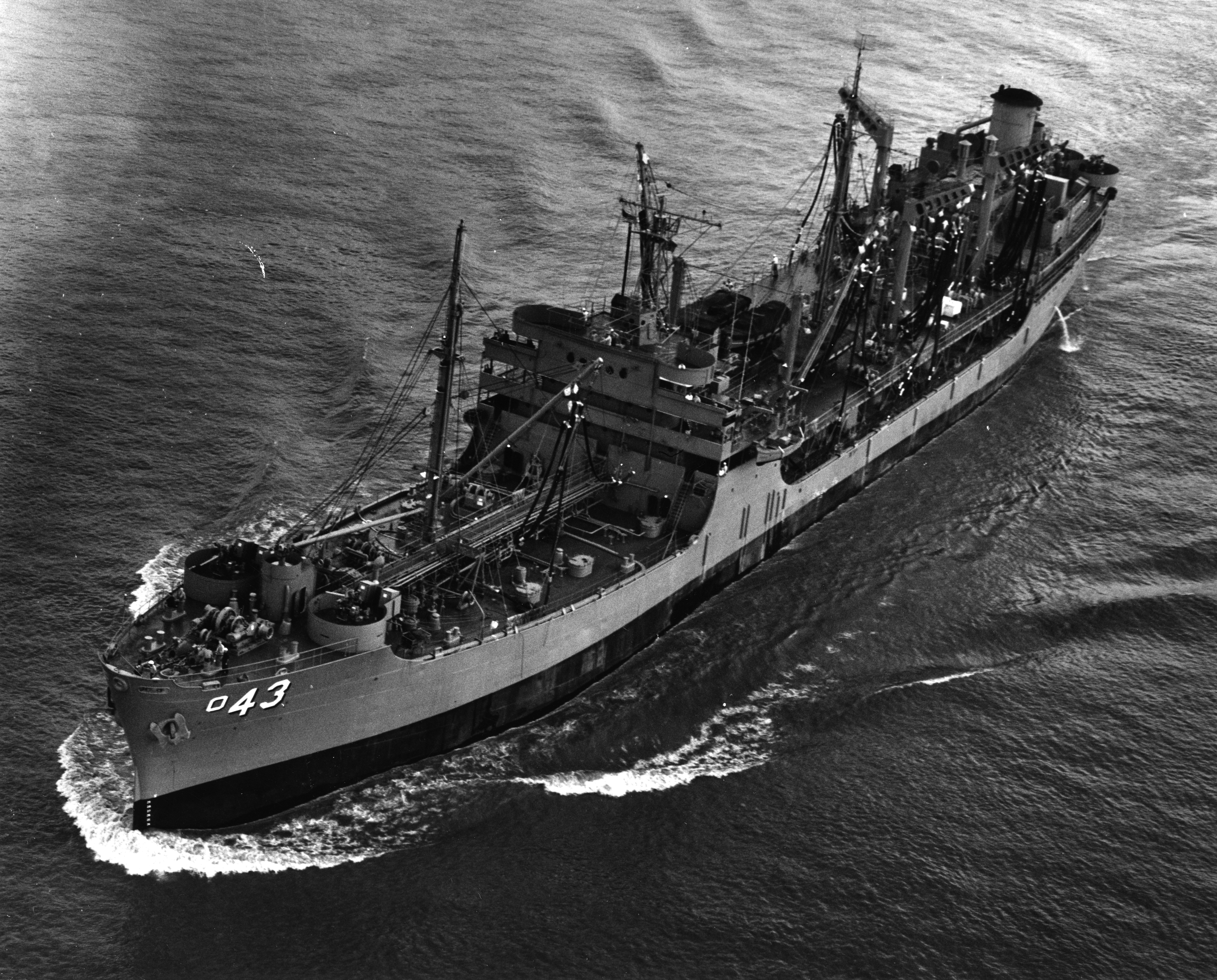
- Tappahannock in 1966

History

United States
- Name: USS Tappahannock
- Builder: Sun Shipbuilding & Drydock Co., Chester, Pennsylvania
- Laid down: 24 December 1941
- Launched: 18 April 1942
- Acquired: 29 May 1942
- Commissioned: 22 June 1942
- Decommissioned: 3 February 1950
- Recommissioned: December 1950
- Decommissioned: January 1955
- Recommissioned: 12 December 1956
- Decommissioned: 18 November 1957
- Recommissioned: 31 May 1966
- Decommissioned: 6 March 1970
- Stricken: 15 July 1976
- Honors and awards: 9 battle stars (World War II); 9 campaign stars (Vietnam)
- Fate: Disposed of by MARAD, 2 February 1987

General characteristics
- Class & type: Mattaponi class oiler
- Type: MARAD T2-A
- Tonnage: 16,400 DWT
- Displacement: 21,750 tons
- Length: 520 ft (160 m)
- Beam: 68 ft (21 m)
- Draft: 29 ft 11.5 in (9.131 m)
- Depth: 37 ft (11 m)
- Installed power: 12,000 shp (8,900 kW)
- Propulsion: geared steam turbine; single screw
- Speed: 16.5 knots (30.6 km/h)
- Range: 7,200 nmi (13,300 km; 8,300 mi)
- Capacity: 133,000 bbl (~18,100 t)
- Complement: 213
- Armament: 1 × single 4"/50 caliber gun; 4 × single 3"/50 caliber dual purpose guns; 12 × 20 mm AA guns

USS Tappahannock (AO-43) was a Kennebec-class oiler in the United States Navy that served during World War II, the Korean War, and the Vietnam War. She was sold for scrap in 1987.

== Service history ==
Tappahannock was laid down as SS Jorkay, a type T2-A tanker, under a Maritime Commission contract (MC hull 157) on 24 December 1941 at Chester, Pennsylvania, by the Sun Shipbuilding & Drydock Co. (hull number 226). Renamed Tappahannock and designated AO-43 on 31 March 1942, she was launched on 18 April 1942, sponsored by Mrs. George Jessup, acquired by the Navy from the War Shipping Administration on 29 May 1942, and converted for Navy service at the Philadelphia Navy Yard between 1 June and 17 July. Nearly midway through this conversion period, the oiler was commissioned on 22 June 1942. She was the only U.S. Navy ship named with the cognate name for the Rappahannock River in eastern Virginia.

=== 1942 ===
Following her shakedown cruise, Tappahannock reported for duty with Commander, Service Force, Atlantic (ComServLant), on 13 August, and soon got underway south for Panama. In the Canal Zone, the oiler took on board 300 tons of stores for Motor Torpedo Boat Squadron (MTBRon) 3, as well as two PT boats, and left Balboa on 29 August, bound for the South Pacific

Tappahannock unloaded her cargo at Nouméa, New Caledonia, on 18 September; and then visited Auckland, New Zealand; Pago Pago, Samoa; and Nadi, Fiji, before becoming station tanker at Nouméa. There, she fueled a wide variety of ships until 20 November, when she headed for the west coast.

Tappahannock arrived at San Pedro on 11 December and then moved to San Diego, where she remained through the end of the year.

=== 1943 ===
Getting underway again on 2 January 1943, the oiler operated briefly out of Dutch Harbor, Alaska, before returning south to San Pedro and San Francisco en route back to the South Pacific.

By early spring, Tappahannock was in the Guadalcanal area, as American forces sought to consolidate their hold on the bitterly contested Solomons. On 1 April, a Grumman J2F Duck seaplane, attached to Enterprise (CV-6), crashed into the oiler's mainmast and damaged her radar tower and antenna. The ship then shifted her berth from Espiritu Santo to Tulagi Harbor.

On 6 April, she proceeded to Lunga Point, off Guadalcanal, and then commenced transferring fuel and diesel oil to Kanawha (AO-1) and Fuel Oil Barge YO-147, as well as transferring highly volatile aviation gas to shore tanks. Later in the day, at 1930, Japanese aircraft succeeded in dropping a few bombs astern of Tappahannock's berth during a nuisance raid, but did no damage.

The following day found the oiler still off Lunga, pumping aviation gasoline to tanks ashore. At 1130, the ship received an air raid alert for a Japanese attack expected at 1245. Fifteen minutes later, Tappahannock intercepted a dispatch ordering all ships in the vicinity to get underway immediately. The oiler disconnected her fueling hose and quickly got underway, in company with destroyers Woodworth (DD-460) and Farenholt (DD-491). The trio then proceeded through the Lunga Channel at their best sustained smokeless speed of 17 knots. Unknowingly the American sailors were steaming directly in the path of a segment of Admiral Isoroku Yamamoto's force as he made his last thrust against the American Navy in the Solomon Islands.

At 1510, as the three-ship convoy steamed through a smooth sea, beneath an overcast sky, a "Condition-Red" warning sounded from Guadalcanal. Four minutes later, lookouts noted tell-tale bursts far astern, and then spotted seven aircraft milling about, as if engaged in a "dog fight." But suddenly the apparent melee became an orderly formation of Aichi D3A "Vals."

For the next five minutes, Tappahannock, the key target of the Japanese dive bombers, fought for her life. The first Japanese dive bomber came in from off the port quarter — as the ship was swinging to starboard to evade the attack — and dropped her bomb abaft the bridge. The oiler shuddered as the explosion sent up a geyser of water higher than the mainmast. Three cane fenders and a Franklin lifebuoy were carried away topside while a fountain of water showered the bridge. Below, thermo overload switches went dead in the machinery spaces, and the oiler began to lose way.

In the meantime, Tappahannock's gunners concentrated their fire on the Japanese aircraft; and it dipped lower and lower until it splashed into the water. At the same time, a quick glance in Woodworth's direction revealed that the destroyer was keeping up her share of anti-aircraft fire.

While Tappahannock's "black gang" below valiantly fought to get underway again, a second attacker came in from off the oiler's starboard bow, on a course diagonally across the ship and soon entered the concentrated gunfire of one three-inch and three 20-millimeter guns. However, the "Val" stubbornly remained airborne and escaped the hail of gunfire; but no sooner had the second aircraft been driven off when three of the oiler's 20-millimeter guns jammed.

Her engineers soon were able to get the ship underway again, and Tappahannock began to pick up steam. Putting her helm over hard-a-port, the ship prepared to face a third tormentor which came in from directly astern.

A fourth "Val" followed the third one, and, in the disbelieving eyes of the gunners astern, "walked right into" the fire of their guns, coming, in the astonished view of one gun captain — "right down the tracer trajectory." Hit after hit began to tear pieces off the "Val" as it wobbled through the hail of gunfire. Its bomb exploded off the oiler's starboard quarter, and Tappahannock's number six 20-millimeter mount on the bridge "polished off" the enemy dive bomber, sending it spinning into the water where it exploded, leaving only a fleeting pall of smoke to mark its passing.

The fifth and final "Val" crossed the ship from starboard to port, on a path directly across her well-deck aft. His bomb detonated just alongside, causing more severe vibrations than the first near miss and leading to fears that, this time, the ship had suffered serious harm. However, a subsequent check of the damage revealed only some dished hull-plates. As suddenly as it had begun, the attack was over.

The oiler's companions had also emerged unscathed, and Woodworth claimed downing one "Val". However, behind them at Tulagi, others had not fared as well. Kanawha and Aaron Ward (DD-483) had been struck and sunk.

The oiler arrived at Espiritu Santo soon thereafter, and repair crews from Vestal (AR-4) remedied her topside damage and patched her hull below the waterline. After her repairs had been completed, Tappahannock resumed active service as American forces continued to strengthen their hold on the Solomon Islands. At 0023 on the morning of 24 May, the oiler was again the target of a Japanese air attack, but the nocturnal raider dropped only a single bomb and missed.

The oiler continued supporting Allied operations in the South Pacific until late August when she headed home to the west coast. She then conducted two voyages from San Pedro to Pearl Harbor before heading west to support the American invasion of the Gilbert Islands in November and December.

=== 1944 ===
For the remainder of the war, Tappahannock conducted vital fueling duties for the Fleet as it pounded westward and northward against the Japanese empire. She earned the remainder of her Pacific battle stars by supporting operations which ranged from the Gilbert Islands to Okinawa Gunto. She supported the occupations of Kwajalein, Majuro, Guam, Tinian, the Southern Palaus, Luzon, Okinawa and aided the fast carriers in their raids on the Bonins, Philippines, and Formosa.

In the course of these operations, she conducted underway replenishments with the task forces and served as station tanker in newly occupied lagoons and harbors. Her task was unglamorous, but dangerous and one of the most vital to be entrusted to a support ship. Without "beans, bullets, and black oil," the fast-moving task forces could not have pounded the Japanese empire into submission.

On 18 October 1944, Tappahannock refueled ships of Task Group (TG) 58.3 during their retirement from air strikes on Formosa. The Japanese struck back with torpedo plane attacks on the American forces which damaged cruisers Canberra (CA-70) and Houston (CL-81). On that day, the oiler took on board 185 enlisted men and 12 officers from the stricken Houston and, three days later, disembarked them at Ulithi as she reloaded to resume replenishment duties which she faithfully discharged for the next few weeks.

On 20 November 1944, Tappahannock again lay at anchor at Ulithi. Her war diary noted that, at 0540, Case (DD-370) reported ramming and sinking a submarine. Six minutes later, Mississinewa (AO-59) was torpedoed and immediately enveloped in flames. Tappahannock went to general quarters immediately to be ready should another attack be launched. At 0824, the oiler picked up 36 survivors from Mississinewa which had capsized and sunk.

=== 1945–1948 ===
Between deployments supporting the fast carrier task forces at sea, Tappahannock returned to the west coast of the United States calling at the familiar ports of San Pedro and San Diego, California, as well as at Astoria, Oregon, before heading west on 21 February 1945 and arriving at Pearl Harbor five days later. Subsequently, operating out of Eniwetok, Kerama Retto, and Ulithi, the oiler supported 3rd and 5th Fleet operations against the Japanese homeland — duties which she continued as the war progressed closer and closer to Japan.

After the cessation of hostilities on 14 August, Tappahannock continued in her vital support role during the occupation of the erstwhile enemy's homeland. She arrived at Tokyo Bay on 26 August 1945 and remained there until 22 November when she steamed for Yokosuka. She proceeded thence to Tsingtao, China, where she arrived seven days before Christmas. The oiler remained, as station tanker, at the one-time German colonial showplace city until 26 April 1946, when she got underway for the Near East to load a cargo of oil.

Tappahannock returned to the China Coast in the late spring, making port at Hong Kong, British Crown Colony, on 7 June. She remained there for the rest of that month and into the next, before a typhoon swirled up the South China Sea, forcing the oiler to sea on 16 July for typhoon evasion. Departing Hong Kong on 6 August, she sailed again for the Near East, for Ras Tanura and Colombo, to load another cargo of petroleum products for delivery to the fleet serving on occupation duty in Japanese and Chinese coastal waters.

On 17 September, Tappahannock put into Sasebo, Japan, before heading for Shanghai, China, two days later. She remained there from 22 to 28 September, before sailing for Yokosuka, from which port she operated until 15 October, when she set sail for the west coast, via Pearl Harbor. Tappahannock then conducted local operations out of San Pedro and San Francisco into 1947, before getting underway for Yokosuka in April.

Subsequently, moving to North China, she arrived at Tsingtao on 20 May and began operations at that China port. While engaged in these duties, she was assigned to the Naval Transportation Service on 1 July and shifted her base to Yokohama, Japan. She remained on duty there until sailing for Norfolk, Virginia, on 9 September. She steamed via the Suez Canal to the Mediterranean Sea and made port at Norfolk on 10 January 1948.

=== 1948–1950 ===
The oiler returned to the Mediterranean soon thereafter, transited that body of water and the Suez Canal, and arrived at the Persian Gulf port of Bahrain on 5 April. After filling her tank with petroleum products, she sailed for the east coast of the United States soon thereafter and returned home via the Mediterranean to unload at Portsmouth, New Hampshire, and Norfolk, via Gibraltar, before returning to the Mediterranean in the summer.

For the remainder of the year 1948, Tappahannock operated in the Far East, the Mediterranean, and the Near East, calling at ports ranging from Suez to Yokosuka, before eventually returning to the west coast on 1 August. She remained at San Pedro through the summer, fall, and early winter, before shifting to San Diego on 18 December. Early in 1949, she again headed west for the Far East and thence proceeded across the Mediterranean to operate for a time in northern European waters, calling at Bremerhaven, Germany, and Cherbourg, France, before returning to Norfolk on 4 June.

She next operated for a time in the Caribbean — Aruba, Netherlands West Indies; Roosevelt Roads, Puerto Rico; and Trinidad, British West Indies, before making two round-trip voyages from Houston and Port Arthur, Texas, with petroleum products for Norfolk. She again called at Bremerhaven and Naples before she moved to the Far East, transiting the Suez Canal, calling at Bahrain, transiting the Strait of Malacca, and arriving at Manila on 23 October 1949. While en route to the Philippines, Tappahannock was transferred to the Military Sea Transportation Service (MSTS) and designated T-AO-43.

From Manila, the oiler travelled to the west coast and arrived at San Francisco on 15 November 1949. She remained on the west coast through the end of the year, until she was decommissioned at San Diego on 3 February 1950 and placed in reserve.

=== 1950–1955 ===
However, Tappahannock's sojourn in reserve was brief; for, before mid-year, communist aggression in Korea triggered a build-up of the Navy's fleets in both oceans to respond to the threat. Auxiliary ocean tug Cahokia (ATA-168) towed the veteran oiler to San Francisco, and arrived on 14 December 1950. Soon thereafter, Tappahannock was recommissioned and rejoined MSTS. She proceeded to the east coast and served from there for four years. During the course of these operations, she ranged from the Canal Zone to the Firth of Forth; from Argentia, Newfoundland to Port Arthur, Texas; and in the North Atlantic to the Caribbean and the eastern seaboard of the United States. In January 1955, Tappahannock was again decommissioned and placed in reserve.

=== 1956–1957 ===
On 27 November 1956, Tappahannock was towed to the Todd Shipyard, San Pedro, California, where she was prepared for reactivation. She was recommissioned on 12 December 1956.

She arrived at Aruba on 14 January 1957, picked up a cargo, got underway on the 16th, and proceeded toward Melville, Rhode Island. En route she was diverted to Norfolk. She then conducted one more round trip to Aruba. During the year, her operations ranged from frigid waters inside the Arctic Circle to the warm Caribbean and took her to the Mediterranean. She visited ports in Scotland, Italy, Trinidad, and Germany. On 18 November 1957, Tappahannock was decommissioned at Orange, Texas.The oiler remained laid-up there for over eight years.

=== 1966–1970 ===
In 1966, she was towed to the Naval Support Activity, Algiers, Louisiana, and fitted out for active service. Tappahannock was commissioned at Algiers on 31 May 1966. The ship got underway for the west coast on 11 July, and arrived at San Diego, her home port, on 6 August.

After operations on the coast of southern California, Tappahannock deployed to the Western Pacific (WestPac) on 25 November 1966 and reached Subic Bay, Philippine Islands, en route to service off the Vietnamese coast. On the day before Christmas — after first topping-off with liquid cargo, mail, and provisions — she headed for "Yankee Station" off the coast of Vietnam. Tappahannock supported the 7th Fleet's "Yankee Team" and "Market Time" operations interdicting communist seaborne supply lanes. As in World War II, Tappahannock's duties were not glamorous, but they were vital. In spite of her advancing age and the arrival of newer oilers and replenishment ships, the veteran oiler remained a vital cog in the operations off Vietnam. During the deployment, she steamed 15,000 miles (24,000 km) and delivered nearly 135,000 barrels (21,500 m^{3}) of oil and gasoline.

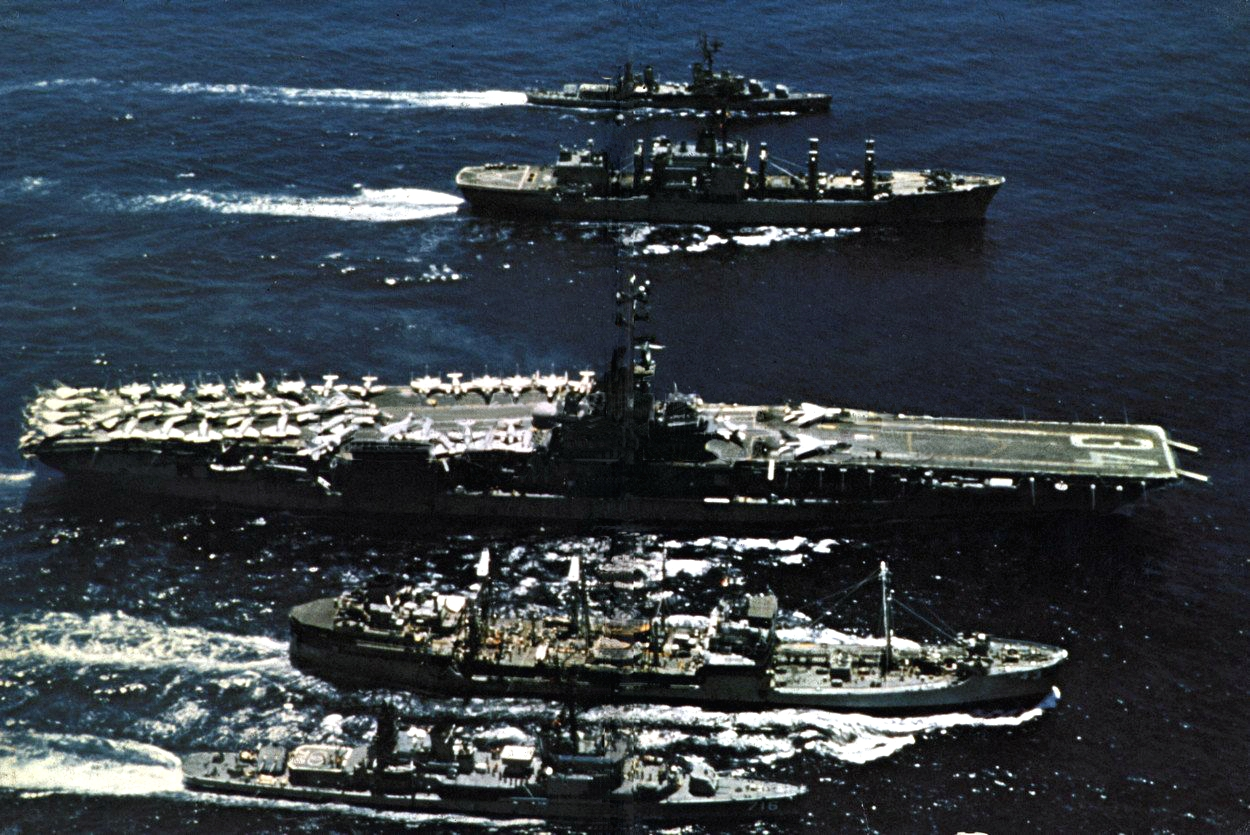
Ships of the 7th Fleet replenishing off Vietnam in May 1969: (from front to back) Wiltsie, Tappahannock, Oriskany, Mars and Perkins.

Returning to the west coast between cruises to the Far East, Tappahannock conducted two more WestPac cruises, continuing her operations in support of 7th Fleet units in the ongoing task of sweeping the sea lanes off South Vietnam. During her second cruise, from March to September 1968, Tappahannock transferred 30,305,196 US gallons (114,717.65 m^{3}) of fuel oil and steamed 42,627 miles (68,602 km) in the course of her operations. She returned to the west coast following the second deployment, underwent much-needed repairs, and served as duty oiler for the Fleet Training Group, and engaged in Fleet exercise Operation "Behavior Pattern." Underway on 6 March 1969, Tappahannock proceeded westward for her third and last WestPac deployment.

Initially based at Sasebo, Tappahannock went to sea in the third week of April as part of Task Force 71 which was hastily assembled after North Korean MiG-15 fighters had shot down a Navy EC-121 Constellation reconnaissance aircraft over the Sea of Japan, killing its entire Navy crew. Once the tensions had abated in the Far East, the oiler headed southward for operations off Vietnam.

These duties on her WestPac deployments were repetitious and never garnered headlines; yet they were necessary and not without a share of danger. On 13 June 1967, during an underway replenishment in the South China Sea, USS Repose (AH-16) suffered a rudder failure and collided with Tappahannock. On another occasion, on 4 October 1967, two fueling booms were carried away during an emergency breakaway from Ranger (CVA-61). That day, quick action by one of Tappahannock's men averted possible tragedy and loss of life.

Tappahannock supported TG 73.5 on "Market Time" interdiction operations off the South Vietnamese Coast during most of her third deployment. The oiler, by now one of the oldest active-duty ships on the Navy list, was clearly aging; and replacements for many of her worn-out parts were hard to find or unavailable. She nevertheless was able to deliver some 10,000,000 US gallons (38,000 m^{3}) of oil and 50 tons of mail during 138 underway replenishments. At the end of her eventful and memorable last cruise, she returned to Long Beach, California, on 21 September 1969. Tappahannock was decommissioned at San Diego on 6 March 1970 and went into reserve at the Maritime Administration's berths at Suisun Bay. Struck from the Navy List on 15 July 1976, the globe-travelling veteran of World War II, the Cold War, and Vietnam, remained at Suisun Bay until disposed of by MARAD on 2 February 1987.

== Awards ==
Tappahannock received nine battle stars for World War II service and nine for Vietnam service.
