= Motor Torpedo Boat Squadron One =

World War II Motor Torpedo Boat Squadron of US Navy

- Allegiance: United States
- Branch: United States Navy
- Operating Base: Pearl Harbor PT Boat Base; Midway Atoll; Adak Island
- Equipment: PT boats
- Engagements: Attack on Pearl Harbor; Battle of Midway; Aleutian campaign

Commanders
- Commander: Lieutenant William C. Specht 1941

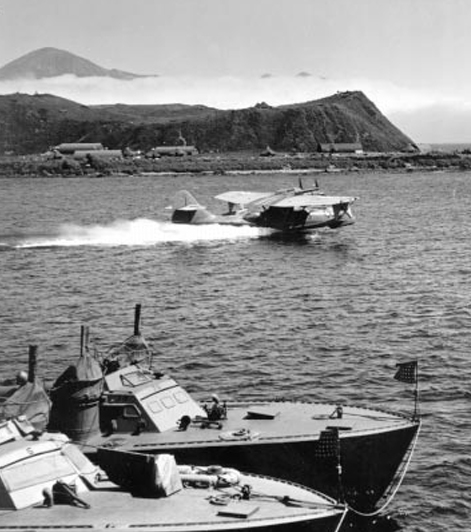
A PBY Seaplane with VPB-61 taxiing past two PT boats in the Aleutians in September 1943

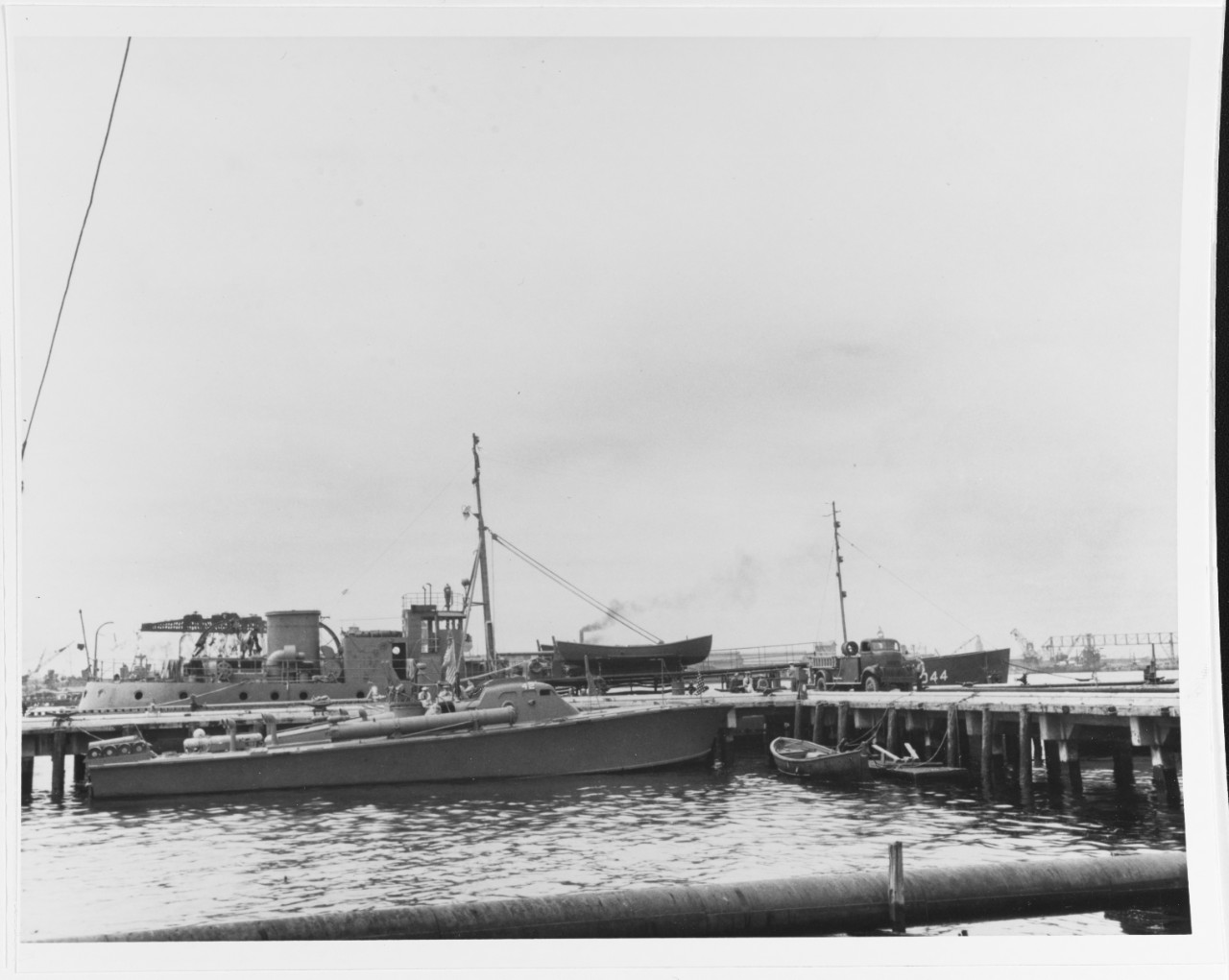
PT-42 at a fueling dock at Pearl Harbor

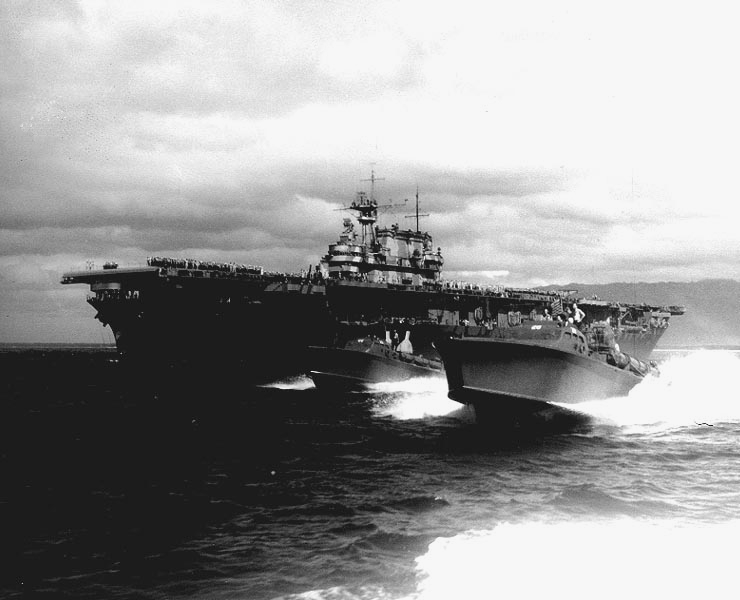
The U.S. Navy aircraft carrier USS Hornet (CV-8) off Pearl Harbor after the Doolittle Raid on Japan, 30 April 1942. PT-28 and PT-29 in the foreground

Motor Torpedo Boat Squadron One (MTBRon 1) was a World War II United States Navy PT boat squadron based at Naval Base Hawaii's Pearl Harbor PT Boat Base on 7 December 1941 during the Attack on Pearl Harbor. It was commanded by Lieutenant Lt. Comdr. William C. Specht and made up of 12 PT boats. After Pearl Harbor, MTBRon 1 was sent to Midway Atoll and took part in the Battle of Midway. MTBRon 1 was then sent to take part in the Aleutian campaign. MTBRon 1 was commissioned 24 July 1940 and decommissioned 9 February 1945.

== History ==
In April 1940 the US Navy designed the idea of PT boat squadrons. PT boat squadrons would have 12 boats each with its own commanding officer. The PT boat captain, called officers-in-charge and the boat's crew in the squadron would move from boat to boat within their squadron, depending on availability of boats and crews. Boats could be transferred from squadron to squadron as needed based on need and losses. A total of 690 PT boats were built between 7 December 1941, and 1 October 1945. The PT boats were put in 43 Motor Torpedo Boat Squadrons. Motor Torpedo Boat Squadron one originally was made up of experimental boats: PT-1, PT-2, PT-3, PT-4, PT-5, PT-6, PT-7, PT-8, and PT-9. After these early prototype boats had been tested and evaluated, MTBRon 1 boats were replaced with new 77-foot Elco Naval Division PT boats. At the outbreak of World War II between the United States and Imperial Japan on 7 December 1941, the squadron one was at the Pearl Harbor PT Boat Base. Of the 12 PT boats at the base, six were at the dock S-13, in Magazine Loch, next to the Pearl Harbor Submarine Base. The other six were at dock B-12 being loaded on the replenishment oiler USS Ramapo to be taken to Naval Base Philippines. A Naval Yard crane was being used to load the boats onto Ramapo. Squadron one personnel were completing breakfast on a submarine barge YR-20. YR-20 was being used as PT boat tender for squadron one. PT boats were moored on the side of and ahead of the barge in three nests of two each. YR-20 was at Berth S-13, at the Pearl Harbor PT Boat Base. At that time the PT boats used the same torpedoes as the submarines, so the PT Boat base shared space with the Submarine Base. At the 7 December 1941 attack the six PT boats at the Pearl Harbor PT Boat Base were: PT-20, PT-21, PT-22, PT-23, PT-24, and PT-25. As the attack began PT Boats were the first to use their anti-aircraft guns to shoot at the attacking planes. Of the six boats on or being loading on to Ramapo, PT-26, PT-27, PT-28, PT-29, PT-30 and PT-42, were able to shoot at the attacking Val bomber, Kate and A6M Zero. The air compressors on each boat had to be start as compressed air is need to operate the two twin .50 caliber turrets on each PT boat. Squadron One Duty Officer in the attack was Ens. N. E. Ball. In the attack, Joy Van Zyll de Jong was credited with assisting in the shooting down of one enemy torpedo plane. George B. Huffman, TM1c was credited with assisting in the shooting down of one enemy torpedo plane with PT-23. The 12 PT Boats fired over 4,000 rounds at the attack planes. PT-23 shot down the first Mitsubishi A6M Zero in the attack. After the attack some of the boats did anti-submarine patrols in and out of Pearl Harbor. The Philippines fell to Japan so the 12 PT Boats were not sent to the Philippines. In May 1942 under their own power they were sent to help defend Midway Atoll, a 1,385 mile trip. On the way PT-23 broke down with a broken crankshaft and returned to Pearl Harbor for repair. PT Boats have a range of about 500 miles, so MTBRon 1 stopped for refueling at Necker Island, French Frigate Shoals, and Lisianski Island.
For the Battle of Midway (4–7 June 1942), MTBRon 1 performed anti-aircraft support. PT-21 and PT-22 were credited with shooting down an A6M Zero fighter plane. MTBRon 1 was assigned Midway Island perimeter patrol. MTBRon 1 also acted as crash boats and doing sea rescue, rescuing downed pilots. Lieutenant Clinton McKellar Jr. was in command of MTBRon 1 for the Battle of Midway, with a base on Sand Island. PT-29 and PT-30 were assigned to Kure Atoll, 55 miles west of Midway. After the battle, on 15 July 1942, MTBRon 1 returned to Pearl Harbor.
MTBRon 1 with just PT Boats: PT-22, PT-24, PT-27, and PT-28 were sent to Adak Island to take part the Aleutian campaign starting in July 1942. The PT boat base was at Finger Bay on Adak Island. At Adak Island was US Navy Base, an airfield, replenishment facilities, a hospital, seaplane base in Andrew Lagoon, a port at Sweeper Cove, and recreational center.

== Squadron One commanders ==
  - Motor Torpedo Boat Squadron one commanders during World War II:
- Lt. Earl S. Caldwell: July 24, 1940 to February 1941, - Testing of PT boats
- Lt. William C. Specht: February 1941 to February 19, 1942, - Attack on Pearl Harbor
- Lt. Clinton Mckellar Jr.: February 19 to 24, 1942
- Lt. John Harllee: February 24 to March 12, 1942
- Lt. Comdr. Clinton Mckellar Jr.: March 12, 1942 to May 1943
- Lt. Herbert J. Sherertz, USNR: May 1943 to October 1943, Battle of Midway (4–7 June 1942)
- Lt. Edward M. Erikson, USNR: October 1943 to February 9, 1945, Aleutian campaign

== Assigned PT boats ==
- PT-20: Transferred 13 August 1941 to MTBRON 1, participated in Dec. 7, Battle of Midway and Aleutian campaign. Struck 22 December 1944.
- PT-21: Transferred 22 December 1942 to MTBRon 3. Struck 11 October 1943
- PT-22: Dec. 7, called Flying Dueces badly damaged in Aleutian campaign by storm off Adak, AK 11 June 1943 and scrapped.
- PT-23: Dec. 7, Battle of Midway, MTBRon 3 transfer on 22 December 1942, reclassified as a Small Craft C-55047
- PT-24: Dec. 7, Battle of Midway, called Blue Bitch, struck 1947,
- PT-25: Dec. 7, Battle of Midway, transfer to MTBRon 3, later C55048
- PT-26: Dec. 7, Battle of Midway, Aleutian campaign, transfer to MTBRon 327 September 1943.
- PT-27: Dec. 7, Battle of Midway, Aleutian campaign, called Sandra Lee, later Small Craft
- PT-28: Dec. 7, Battle of Midway, Aleutian campaign. Wrecked in a storm 12 January 1943 in Dora Harbor, Unimak Island
- 'PT-29: Dec. 7, Battle of Midway, struck 1944
- PT-30: Dec. 7, Battle of Midway, sold in 1947 but fate is unknown.
- PT-42: Dec. 7, Battle of Midway, struck 12 December 1944
- PT-31: Transferred 12 August 1941 in MTBRon 3. Burned by crew to prevent capture 20 January 1942
- PT-33: Transferred 12 August 1941 to MTBRon 3, destroyed to prevent capture 26 December 1941 off Point Santiago, Philippines
- PT-35: Transferred 12 August 1941 to MTBRon 3. Scuttled 12 April 1942 at Cebu, Philippines to prevent capture.
- PT-37: Transferred 13 August 1941 to MTBRon 2, destroyed 1 February 1943 by Japanese off Guadalcanal
- PT-39: Transferred 13 August 1941 to MTBRon 2, destroyed 1945
- PT-41: Transferred 12 August 1941 to MTBRon 3, scuttled 15 April 1942 at Lake Danao, Philippines to prevent capture.
- PT-42: Transferred 12 August 1941 to MTBRon 3, struck December 12, 1944.
- PT-43: Transferred 13 August 1941 to MTBRon 2, destroyed to prevent capture 11 January 1943 at Guadalcanal

== Prototype PT boats ==
Motor Torpedo Boat Squadron one was commissioned July 24, 1940 from new types of prototype PT boats. The Prototype PT boats came from a PT Boat design competition. Two design proposals were picked to be tested 54-foot and 70-foot PT boats. There were wood and aluminium hull designs. The PT boats were built by Miami Shipbuilding in Miami, Florida, Fisher Boatworks in Detroit, Michigan, Higgins Industries in New Orleans and Philadelphia Naval Shipyard in Philadelphia and Hubert Scott-Paine-British Power Boat Company in the Hythe, Hampshire, United Kingdom (used by Electric Launch Company). The Boats were tested in a Plywood Derby by Motor Torpedo Boat Squadron 1 and Motor Torpedo Boat Squadron 2. The Plywood Derby testing at New London Harbor in July 1941 included Higgins PT-6; Philadelphia Navy Yard PT-8; Elco PT-20, PT-26, PT-30, PT-31; Huckins PT-33, PT-69; and Higgins PT-70, as the shorter 54-foot boats were determined to be too small for use. By April 1941 Motor Torpedo Boat Squadron 1 report that the PT-6, the 81-foot Higgins Boat was the best of the prototype PT boats. Motor Torpedo Boat Squadron 1 prototype PT boats were replaced with Elco PT boats from 21 June 1941 to 13 August 1941.

Prototype PT boats
Boat	Length feet	Builder	US Navy Delivery date	Fate - Notes
PT-1	58	Miami Shipbuilding	Nov. 1941	Prototype, not used in MTBRon 1. Wet Dream, later "Small Boat" C6083, training craft and ervice launch at Melville PT Center
PT-2	58	Miami Shipbuilding	Nov. 1941	Prototype, not used in MTBRon 1, later C6084, service launch at Naval Station Newport
PT-3	58	Fisher Boatworks	June 1940	July 24, 1940 Prototype, to Britain in 1941 as MTB-273,Bras D'Or in Canada, now at Flanigan Brothers Boatyard, Fairton, New Jersey for restoration.
PT-4	58	Fisher Boatworks	June 1940	Prototype, Old Faithful & Get In Step then to Britain in 1941 as MTB 274
PT-5	81	Higgins Industries	March 1941	Prototype March 17, 1941, to Britain April 19, 1941 as MTB-269, Abadik in Canada, then yacht Gloria in 1948. Won
PT-6	81	Higgins Industries	Feb. 1941	Prototype March 6, 1941 Prime, to Britain July 29, 1941 as MTB-270
PT-7	81	Philadelphia NSY	April 1941	Prototype (aluminum, not wood) November 20, 1940, to Britain July 19, 1941. as MTB-271, Banoskik in Canada
PT-8	81	Philadelphia NSY	April 1941	Prototype (aluminum, not wood) October 29, 1940, Squadron 2, August 13, 1941, classed as YP-110, District Patrol Craft in October 1941, Sold June 2008 in Franklin, Louisiana
PT-9	81	Scott-Paine	June 1940	First Prototype July 24, 1940, Transferred to Squadron 2, November 8, 1940, to Britain 1940 as MTB 258, V-264 and S-09 in Canada 1942, scrapped 1946. Won.

== Surviving boats ==
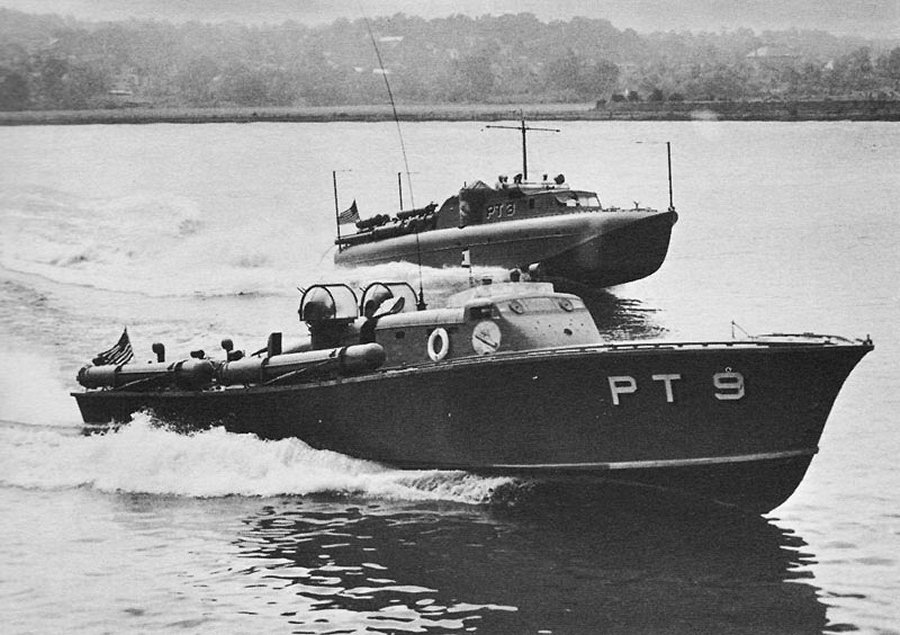
PT-3 in July 1940 back boat built by Fisher Boatworks, (PT-9 in front)

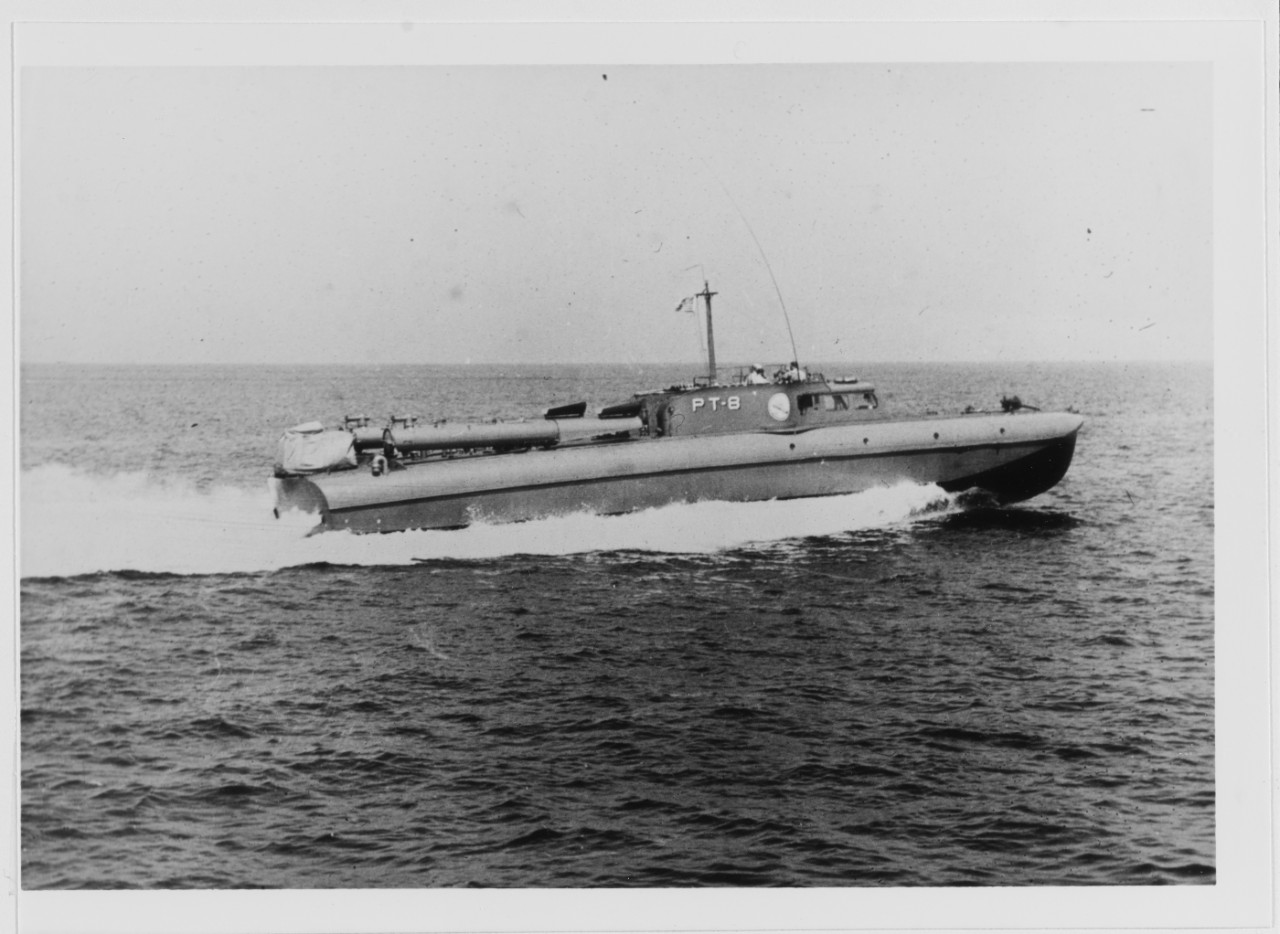
PT-8 Underway in 1941, built by Philadelphia Navy Yard

Of the PT boats in Motor Torpedo Boat Squadron One only two have survived Boats. At the end of the war PT boats were not needed and they used vast amount of fuel, so almost all were scrapped at the end of the war. PT-3 and PT-8 two of Motor Torpedo Boat Squadron One prototype PT boats have survived. PT-3 and PT-8 were part of the PT Boat design competition and PT-8 was part of the Plywood Derby, with PT-3 at 58-feet long was not put in the Plywood Derby.

=== PT-3 ===
- PT-3 built by Fisher Boatworks in Detroit, Michigan. PT-3 has a displacement of 25 tons, she has a length of 58-feet and beam of 18-foot. PT-3 was placed in US Navy service 24 July 1940 and assigned to Motor Torpedo Boat Squadron ONE (MTBRon 1) for evaluations. MTBRon 1, was under the command of Lt. Earl S. Caldwell. MTBRon 1 was the first PT squadron commissioned and originally was made up of experimental boats PT-3 was transferred 19 April 1942 to the Royal Navy and reclassified HM MTB-273, but the transfer to the Royal Navy was canceled, transferred to the Royal Canadian Air Force and named Bras D'Or (M-413) for use as a High Speed Rescue Boat, reclassified B-119. Returned to U.S. Navy 10 April 1945. Transferred to the War Shipping Administration 2 May 1946, and sold. In 2012 was at Flanigan Brothers Boatyard, in Fairton, New Jersey, for restoration.

=== PT-8 ===
- PT-8 was built by Philadelphia Navy Yard with an experimental aluminum-hulled. She has a displacement 51.93 tons, length of 80-feet and 7.75 inches, beam of 16-feet and 8 inches, and a draft of 3-feet. She has a top speed 41 knots. Has built she had four Allison V-12 gasoline engines with 1000 hp each, arranged in X-configuration. Later she was upgraded to have standard PT Boat engines: two Packard 4M-2500 two shafts. PT-8 was put in the US Navy's Motor Torpedo Boat Squadron One on 25 February 1941. PT-8 was ordered on 23 June 1939, laid down on 29 December 1939 and launched on 29 October 1940. She was transferred to Motor Torpedo Boat Squadron Two on 13 August 1941 for more testing. Her design was not selected to be a PT boat. So, she was reclassified a District Patrol Craft, and renamed YP-110, on 14 October 1941 and assigned to inshore patrol with the Fourth Naval District in 1942 in Philadelphia. PT-8 was struck from the Naval Register on 10 January 1943. She was set for salvage on 1 February 1943. But she was retained at Philadelphia Navy Yard for more tests and use. The Navy later sold her postwar. She was sold on eBay in June 2008 and in Franklin, Louisiana, in 2010.

== Gallery ==
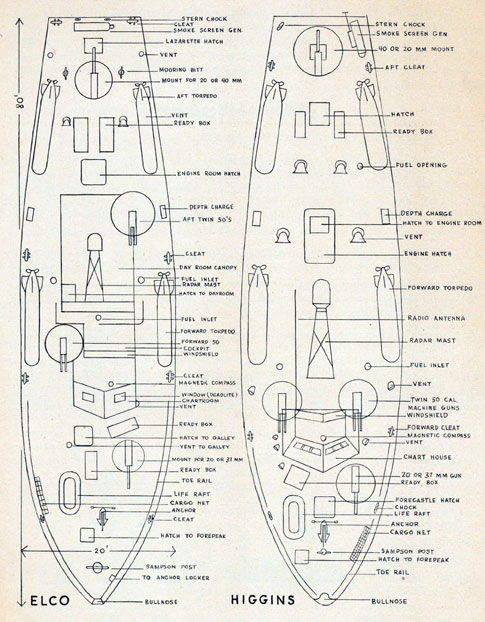
ELCO and Higgins PT boats, Know Your PT Boat US Navy July 1945

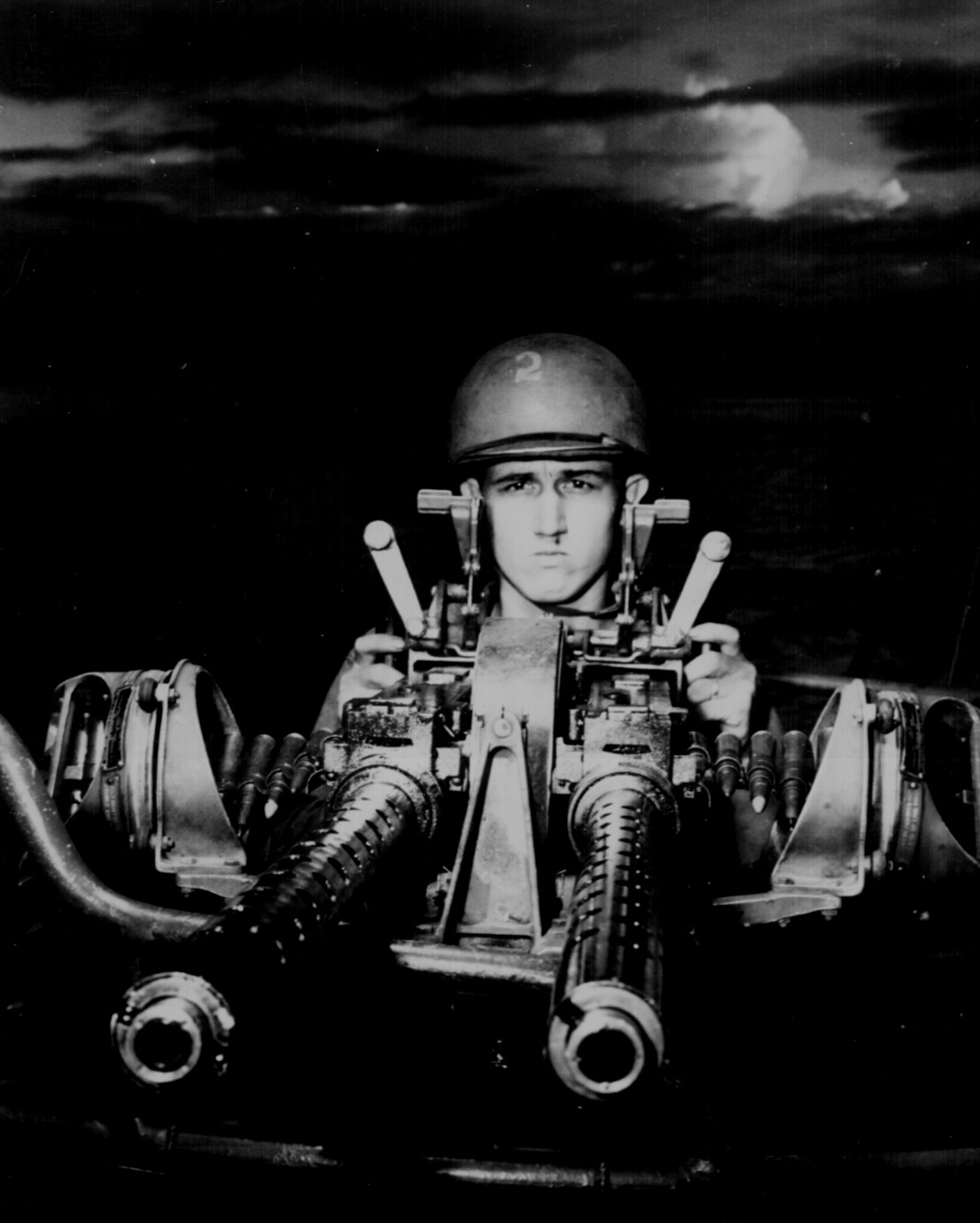
PT Boat 50 cal. gun M2 Browning

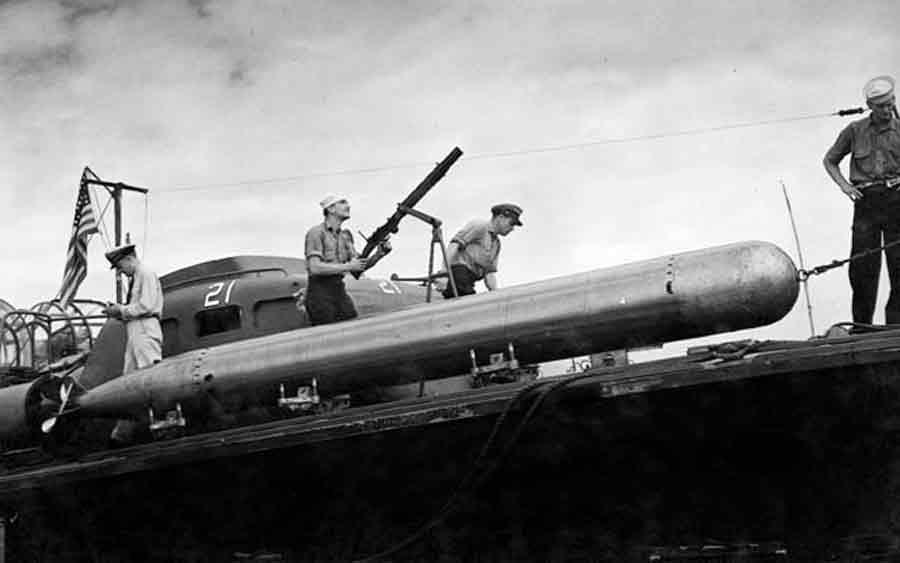
PT Mark 8 torpedo

== Bibliography ==
- White, William L. (1942). They Were Expendable. London: H. Hamilton. LCCN 43008243.
- Bulkley, Robert J. Jr. (2012). "The Fleet Withdraws". At Close Quarters: PT Boats in the United States Navy. Historical Studies. ISBN 9781622800049.
