= Patrol torpedo boat PT-42 =

Torpedo boat of the United States Navy

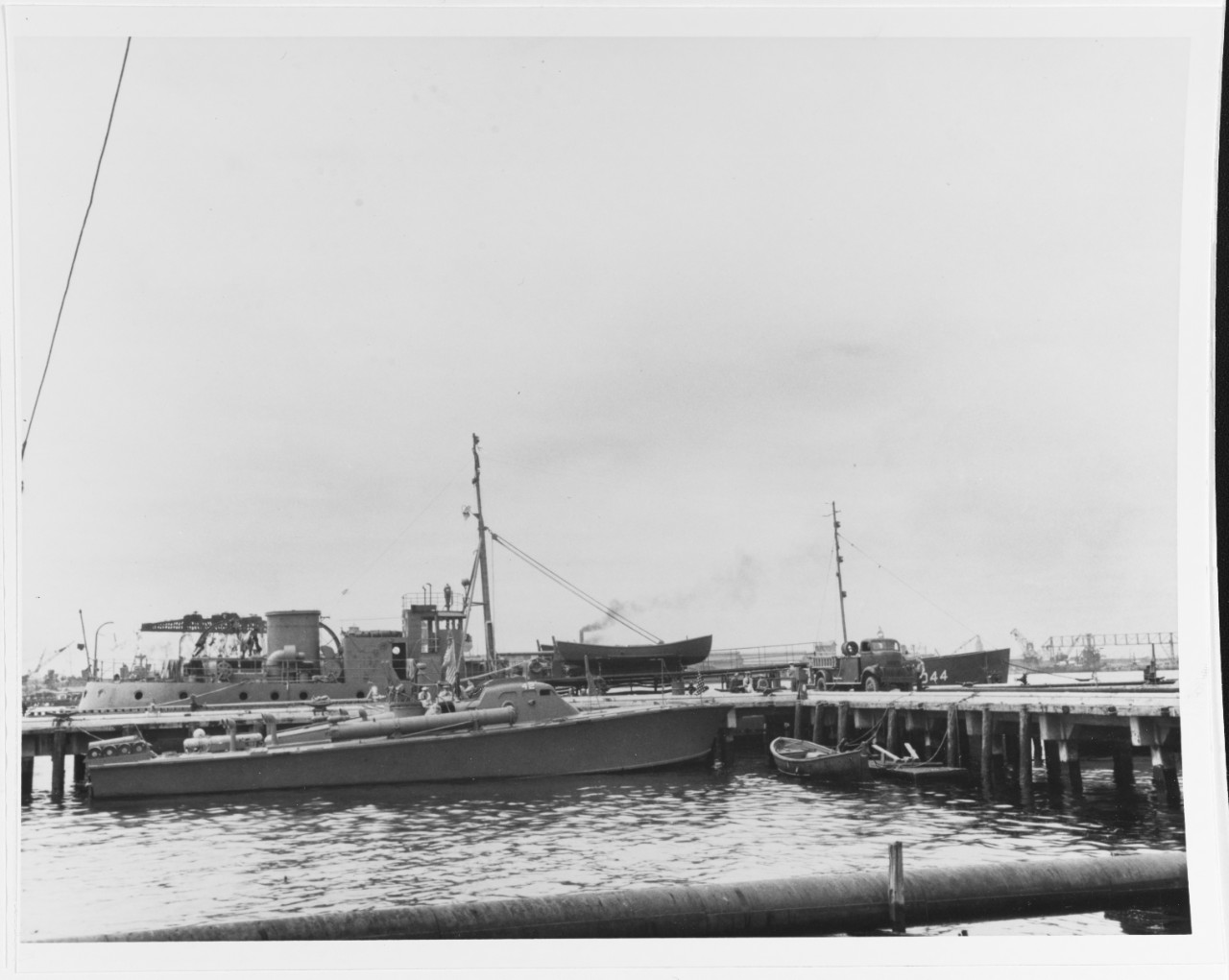
- PT-42 at a fueling dock at Pearl Harbor, April 1944. YO-44 is on the opposite side of the pier.

History

United States
- Name: PT-42
- Builder: Electric Boat Company
- Laid down: 5 May 1941
- Launched: 12 July 1941
- Completed: 25 July 1941
- Stricken: 12 December 1944
- Notes: Call sign: NUPI

General characteristics
- Type: Patrol torpedo boat
- Tonnage: 40 GRT
- Length: 77 ft (23 m) o/a
- Beam: 19 ft 11 in (6.07 m)
- Height: 4 ft 6 in (1.37 m)
- Propulsion: Three 1,500 hp (1,100 kW) Packard V12 M2500 gasoline engines, three shafts.
- Armament: 2 × twin .50 caliber Browning M2 machine guns; 2 × .303 caliber Lewis machine guns; 2 × 21 in (533 mm) torpedo tubes; Four torpedoes

Service record
- Operations: Battle of Pearl Harbor; Battle of Midway

PT-42 was a PT-20-class motor torpedo boat of the United States Navy that served during World War II.

== History ==
PT-42 was commissioned by the United States Navy and laid down on 5 May 1941 at the Elco Works of the Electric Launch Company (now Electric Boat Company) at their Bayonne, New Jersey shipyard; launched on 12 July 1941; and completed on 25 July 1941. She was commissioned and attached to Motor Torpedo Boat Squadron Two (MTBRon 2) under the command of Lt. Comdr. Earl S. Caldwell and assigned to patrol the Panama Canal Zone. On 13 August 1941, she was transferred to Motor Torpedo Boat Squadron One (MTBRon 1) under the command of Lt. William C. Specht and assigned to Pearl Harbor. During the attack on Pearl Harbor, PT-42 was already loaded on the replenishment oiler Ramapo for MTBRon 1's assignment to the Philippines and as she could not get her motors started, the hydraulics on their gun turrets were not operative. Crewmembers cut the hydraulic lines and operated the turrets manually. All 12 boats of the squadron fired on the attacking Japanese aircraft with one, PT-23, credited with shooting down two Nakajima B5N "Kate" torpedo bombers.

In May 1942, the squadron was reassigned to Lt. Clinton McKellar Jr. and tasked with the defense of Midway Island being led by Marine Corps Colonel Harold D. Shannon. The squadron made the 1,385-mile (2,229 km) trip under their own power, then the longest made by PT boats to date refueling at Necker Island, French Frigate Shoals, and Lisianski Island. 11 of the 12 PT boats of MTBRon 1 made it to Midway (PT-23 had broken a crankshaft en route and was forced to return to Pearl Harbor). PT-42 along with PT-20, PT-21, PT-22, PT-24, PT-25, PT-26, PT-27, PT-28 were assigned to Midway Island while PT-30 and PT-29 were assigned to Kure Atoll (55 mi, 89 km west of Midway Island). During the Battle of Midway, they were tasked with providing anti-aircraft support (PT-21 and PT-22 were credited with downing a Mitsubishi A6M Zero fighter), patrolling the perimeter of the island, and the rescuing of downed pilots. After the battle, the squadron was sent to attack the remainder of the Japanese task force but was unable to locate the target. On 15 July 1942, the squadron returned to Pearl Harbor and then was divided: PT-21, PT-23, PT-25, and PT-26 (along with motor torpedo boat tender Hilo) were deployed to Palmyra Atoll; PT-22, PT-24, PT-27, and PT-28 were deployed to Adak Island in the Aleutians; while PT-42, along with PT-20, PT-29, and PT-30 remained at Pearl Harbor.

On 12 December 1944, PT-42 was struck from the Navy list due to obsolescence.
