= USS Suwannee (CVE-27) =

Sangamon class escort carrier

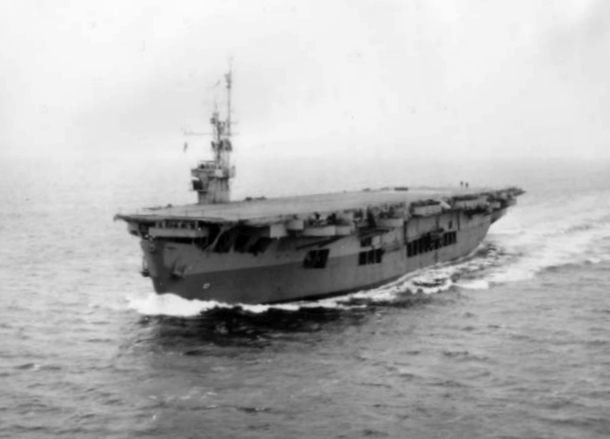
- USS Suwannee underway, after repairs from the kamikaze attacks of October 1944.

History

United States
- Name: Markay
- Owner: Keystone Tankship Corp.
- Ordered: as type (T2-S2-A1) hull, MCE hull 5
- Awarded: 3 January 1938
- Builder: Federal Shipbuilding and Dry Dock Company, Kearny, New Jersey
- Cost: $879,864.31
- Yard number: 151
- Way number: 5
- Laid down: 3 June 1938
- Launched: 4 March 1939
- Sponsored by: Mrs. Howard L. Vickery
- In service: 25 May 1939
- Out of service: 22 October 1940
- Fate: Sold to US Navy, 26 June 1941

United States
- Name: Suwannee
- Namesake: Suwannee River, in Georgia and Florida
- Acquired: 26 June 1941
- Commissioned: 16 July 1941
- Decommissioned: 21 February 1942
- Refit: Philadelphia Navy Yard, Philadelphia, Pennsylvania
- Identification: Hull symbol: AO-33; Callsign: NICO
- Recommissioned: 24 September 1942
- Decommissioned: 8 January 1947
- Refit: Newport News Shipbuilding and Drydock Co., Newport News, Virginia
- Stricken: 1 March 1959
- Identification: Hull symbol: AVG-27 (14 February 1942); ACV-27 (20 August 1942); CVE-27 (15 July 1943); CVHE-27 (12 June 1955); Callsign: NWQD
- Fate: Sold, May 1961, scrapped in Bilbao, Spain, June 1962

General characteristics as fleet oiler
- Class & type: Cimarron-class oiler
- Displacement: 7,470 long tons (7,590 t) light; 25,425 long tons (25,833 t) full load
- Length: 525 ft (160 m) wl
- Beam: 75 feet (23 m)
- Draft: 32 ft 3 in (9.83 m)
- Installed power: 4 × Babcock & Wilcox steam boilers (450 psi (3,100 kPa)); 13,500 shp (10,100 kW)
- Propulsion: 2 × Westinghouse geared steam turbines; 2 × shafts
- Speed: 18.3 kn (33.9 km/h; 21.1 mph)
- Capacity: 122,400 bbl (19,460 m^{3}) of oil; 805,000 US gal (3,050,000 L; 670,000 imp gal) of gasoline
- Complement: 301 officers and men
- Armament: 4 × single 5 in (130 mm)/51 cal guns]; 4 × twin Bofors 40 mm (1.6 in) anti-aircraft guns; 4 × twin Oerlikon 20 mm (0.79 in) anti-aircraft cannons

General characteristics as escort carrier
- Class & type: Sangamon-class escort carrier
- Displacement: 11,400 long tons (11,583 t) standard; 24,275 long tons (24,665 t) full
- Length: 553 ft 6 in (168.71 m) oa; 503 ft (153 m) flight deck
- Beam: 75 ft (23 m); 105 ft (32 m) flight deck
- Draft: 30 ft 7 in (9.32 m)
- Range: 23,920 nmi (44,300 km; 27,530 mi) at 15 kn (28 km/h; 17 mph)
- Complement: 830 officers and men
- Armament: 2 × 5"/51 caliber guns; 4 × twin Bofors 40 mm L/60 anti-aircraft guns; 12 × single Oerlikon 20 mm cannons
- Aircraft carried: 25
- Aviation facilities: 1 × hydraulic catapult; 2 × elevators

General characteristics 1945
- Complement: 1,080 officers and men
- Armament: 2 × quad Bofors 40 mm L/60 anti-aircraft guns; 10 × twin Bofors 40 mm L/60 anti-aircraft guns; 19 × single Oerlikon 20 mm cannons
- Aircraft carried: 32
- Aviation facilities: 2 × hydraulic catapults

Service record
- Commanders: Joseph J. Clark (1942–43)
- Operations: World War II
- Awards: 13 battle stars

USS Suwannee (AVG/ACV/CVE-27), was a US Navy escort carrier of World War II. Originally built as Markay, one of twelve tankers built by a joint Navy-Maritime Commission design. This design was later duplicated and designated a T3-S2-A1 oiler. She was acquired by the Navy in 1941, and renamed Suwannee (AO-33), a Cimarron-class fleet oiler. In 1942, she was converted to a Sangamon-class escort carrier. Originally classified as an "Aircraft Escort Vessel", AVG-27, on 14 February 1942, she was reclassified an "Auxiliary Aircraft Carrier", ACV-27, 20 August 1942, before finally being classified as an "Escort Carrier", CVE-27, 15 July 1943. After the war, she was later classified an "Escort Helicopter Aircraft Carrier" and again redesignated, CVHE-27, 12 June 1955. She was named after the Suwannee River, in Georgia and Florida.

== Construction ==
Markay was laid down on 3 June 1938, at Kearney, New Jersey, by the Federal Shipbuilding & Dry Dock Company, MC hull 5; launched on 4 March 1939; sponsored by Mrs. Marguerite Vickery (née Blanchard), wife of Howard L. Vickery; delivered to the Keystone Shipping Company's subsidiary Keystone Tankship Corporation.

== Service history ==
On 26 June 1941, the US Navy acquired Markay and renamed her Suwannee (AO-33), the ship was commissioned "in ordinary", an inactive status, on 9 July 1941, then placed in commission, on 16 July 1941, as a Cimarron-class fleet oiler.

=== Fleet oiler service ===
After fitting out at the Philadelphia Navy Yard, from 23 to 31 July 1941, Suwannee transported passengers to Hampton Roads, then on 9 August, she continued on to the Gulf of Mexico, proceeding to New Orleans, Louisiana, from 14 to 16 August, before she returned to Norfolk, on 21 August, setting course later the same day for the New York Navy Yard, Brooklyn, New York. Suwannee there embarked officers and men of Motor Torpedo Boat Squadron 1 (MTBRon 1), and loaded six 77-foot Elco Motor Yachts (ELCO) torpedo boats: PT-20, PT-21, PT-22, PT-23, PT-24, and PT-25, from 24 to 26 August. The oiler and her passengers and deck cargo began their voyage when she stood out on 26 August.

After transiting the Panama Canal, from 31 August—1 September 1941, Suwannee proceeded directly to San Pedro, California, from 9—11 September, whence she sailed on 11 September for Oahu, Territory of Hawaii. She steamed to Pearl Harbor, where she disembarked the officers and men and offloaded MTBRon 1's six ELCOs, completing that operation on 18 September. Shifting to Honolulu, on 20 September, the oiler sailed for San Pedro, with two leave-bound USMC non-commissioned officers and one enlisted marine, from Marine Aircraft Group 21, later the same day.

Reaching San Pedro, on 26 September 1941, Suwannee embarked east coast-bound travelers on that day and the next, disembarking the three USMC passengers who had ridden the ship from Hawaiian waters. The new passengers’ destinations ranged from new construction, like the carrier Hornet, the destroyer Hambleton, and the submarine Finback, to the gunboat Erie. A Sea2c, however, who embarked on 26 September with orders to report to the light cruiser Savannah, deserted before the oiler cleared San Pedro, for the Canal Zone, on 28 September.

Suwannee paused briefly at the Canal Zone, from 6—9 October 1941, disembarking four passengers during her time there, a PhM2c to the US Naval Hospital, Balboa, and an MM2c to the gunboat Erie, on 6 October, and an OS3c to the Submarine Base, Coco Solo, Canal Zone, on 8 October; then continued on for Galveston, Texas. Shifting thence to Baytown, Texas, she took on cargo, after which she took departure on 15 October. Disembarking three more passengers at Bayonne, New Jersey, on 21 October, Suwannee sailed for Hampton Roads, the next day. Following her arrival, the oiler disembarked more passengers from 23 to 25 October.

Clearing Norfolk, for the Gulf Area, on 3 November 1941, Suwannee arrived at her destination after a passage of five days, after which she sailed down the Houston Ship Channel, setting course for Argentia, Newfoundland, on 10 November, where she provided services to the Atlantic Fleet's ships as the fleet's involvement in the Battle of the Atlantic intensified. Arriving at her destination on 17 November, she remained at Argentia, until she sailed for Hampton Roads, on 4 December, with passengers, the largest group of which, 29, held orders to the carrier Yorktown. Suwannee's work at Argentia would earn her the American Defense Service Medal, from 16 to 22 November 1941.

Suwannee disembarked her passengers, then underwent a restricted availability at the Norfolk Navy Yard, during which time the Japanese unleashed their onslaught in the Pacific, 7—8 December 1941, and Germany joined its Axis partner on 11 December. Against that backdrop of the United States' being at war in both oceans, the oiler sailed from Hampton Roads, on 13 December, and set course for New Orleans, and there loaded a cargo of oil. Departing that port on 19 December, Suwannee touched at San Juan, Puerto Rico, then returned to Norfolk. Suwannee cleared Norfolk, on 11 January 1942, for Bermuda, with passengers that included six bound for the carrier Ranger, five for Savannah, and two for the destroyer Rhind. Disembarking her passengers on 14 January, she provided fueling services there before returning to Hampton Roads, where, upon completion of unloading, she began preparations to undergo conversion.

=== Conversion to escort carrier ===
After operating for six months as an oiler with the Atlantic Fleet, Suwannee was designated an "Aircraft Escort Vessel", AVG-27, on 14 February 1942, and decommissioned, on 21 February, at Newport News, Virginia, for conversion to a Sangamon-class escort carrier, at Newport News Shipbuilding & Dry Dock Co. On 20 August, she was redesignated an "Auxiliary Carrier", ACV-27, and was recommissioned as such on 24 September 1942.

=== Escort carrier service ===
==== 1942 ====
Less than a month after commissioning, Suwannee was underway from Hampton Roads, for the invasion of North Africa. She joined Ranger, as the other carrier attached to the Center Attack Group, whose specific objective was Casablanca, itself, via Fedhala, just to the north. Early in the morning of 8 November, she arrived off the coast of Morocco, and for the next few days, her Grumman F4F Wildcats maintained combat (CAP) and anti-submarine (ASW) air patrols, while her Grumman TBF Avengers joined Ranger's in bombing missions. During the Naval Battle of Casablanca from 8–11 November, Suwannee sent up 255 air sorties and lost only five planes, three in combat and two to operational problems.

On 11 November, off Fedhala Roads, her ASW patrol sank what was reported to be a German U-boat, but which was later determined to have been Sidi Ferruch, one of the three French submarines which sortied from Casablanca, on the day of the assault. She was the first escort carrier to score against an enemy submarine, and she helped to prove the usefulness of her type in ASW.

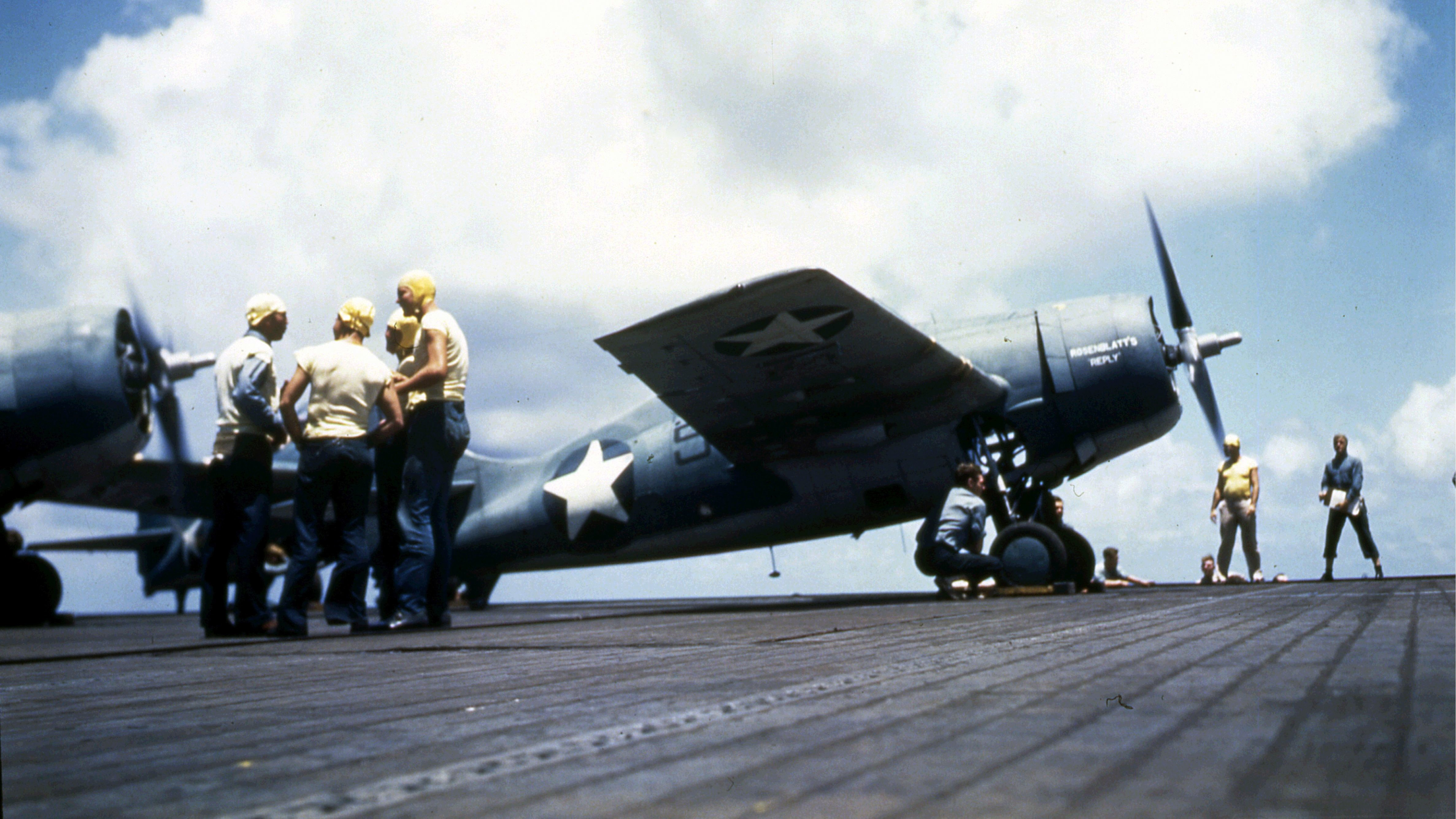
F4F "Rosenblatt's Reply" on Suwannee, 1942–1943

Suwannee remained in North African waters until mid-November, then sailed, via Bermuda, for Norfolk. She arrived back at Hampton Roads, on 24 November, and stayed until 5 December, when she got underway for the South Pacific.

==== 1943 ====
The auxiliary carrier transited the Panama Canal, on 11–12 December, and arrived at New Caledonia, on 4 January 1943. For the next seven months, she provided air escort for transports and supply ships replenishing and bolstering the Marines on Guadalcanal, as well as for the forces occupying other islands in the Solomons group. During that span of time, she visited Guadalcanal, Efate, and Espiritu Santo, in addition to New Caledonia. She was reclassified as an "Escort Carrier", CVE-27, on 15 July 1943.

She returned to the United States at San Diego, in October, and by 5 November, was back at Espiritu Santo. On 13 November, she departed to participate in the Gilbert Islands operation. From 19 to 23 November, she was a part of the Air Support Group of the Southern Attack Force, and her planes bombed Tarawa, while the ships in the Northern Attack Force engaged the enemy at Makin. Following the occupation of the Gilberts, the escort carrier returned to the US, via Pearl Harbor, arriving in San Diego, on 21 December.

==== 1944 ====
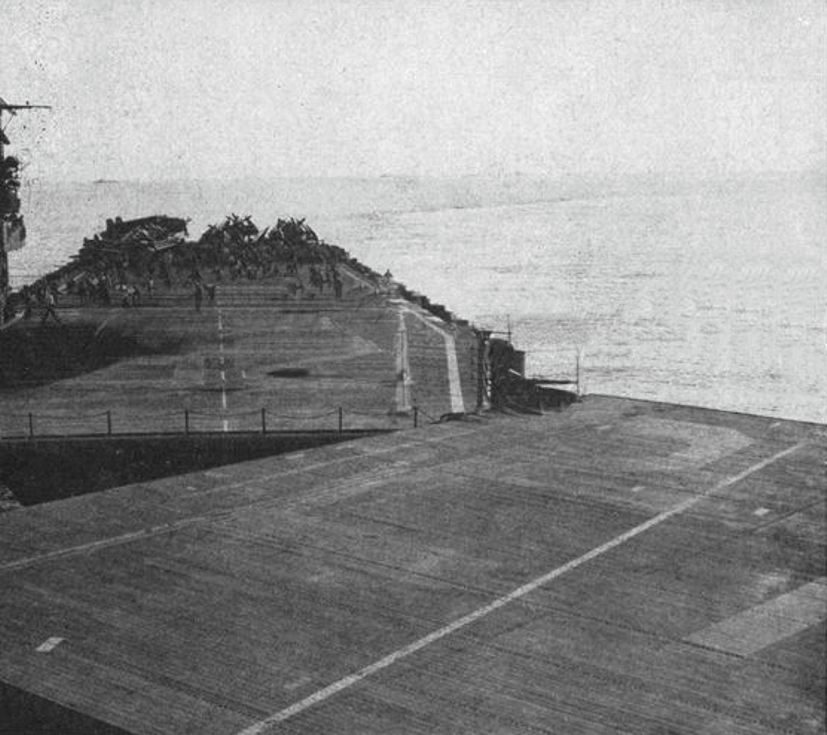
Collision between Sangamon and Suwannee, 26 January 1944

She remained on the west coast for two weeks, into the new year, then set a course for Lahaina Roads, in the Hawaiian Islands. She departed Hawaii, on 22 January 1944, and headed for the Marshalls. During that operation, Suwannee joined the Northern Attack Force, and her planes bombed and strafed Roi and Namur Islands, in the northern part of Kwajalein Atoll, and conducted anti-submarine patrols for the task force.

On the 26 January there was a collision with her sister ship, the Sangamon. No personnel were injured but 20 ft (6.1 m) of her flight deck was buckled and some parts of the ship torn off and lost. Both carriers were able to continue air operations. Suwannee's captain was found to be responsible, but this had little effect on his career and he was later promoted.

Suwannee remained in the vicinity of Kwajalein for the first 15 days of February, then spent the next nine days helping out at Eniwetok. On 24 February, she headed east again and arrived at Pearl Harbor, on 2 March, for a two-week stay.

By 30 March, she was in the vicinity of the Palau Islands as the 5th Fleet subjected those islands to two days of extensive bombing raids. A week later, she put into Espiritu Santo, for four days. After short stops at Purvis Bay, in the Solomons, and at Seeadler Harbor, Manus, the escort carrier headed for New Guinea. For two weeks, she supported the Hollandia landings by shuttling replacement aircraft to the larger fleet carriers actually engaged in air support of the landings. She returned to Manus, on 5 May.

Following two voyages from Espiritu Santo, one to Tulagi, and the other to Kwajalein, Suwannee arrived off Saipan, in mid-June. For the next one and a half months, she supported the invasion of the Marianas, participating in the campaigns against Saipan and Guam. On 19 June, as the Battle of the Philippine Sea began to unfold, Suwannee was one of the first ships to draw enemy blood when one of her planes flying combat air patrol attacked and sank the Japanese submarine I-184, while she was on the surface, with four 325 lb (147 kg) depth charges. Suwanee's planes did not actually become engaged in the famous battle of naval aircraft, because they remained with the invasion forces in the Marianas providing ASW and CAPs.

On 4 August, she cleared the Marianas for Eniwetok and Seeadler Harbor, reaching the latter port on 13 August. Almost a month later, on 10 September, she put to sea to support the landings on Morotai in the Netherlands East Indies. Those landings went off without opposition on 15 September, and Suwannee returned to Seeadler Harbor, to prepare for the invasion of the Philippines.

On 12 October, the escort carrier got underway from Manus, in Rear Admiral Thomas L. Sprague's Escort Carrier Group to provide air support for the landings at Leyte Gulf. She reached the Philippines several days later, and her planes began strikes on enemy installations in the Visayas, until 25 October. She provided air support for the assault forces with ASW and CAPs and strikes against Japanese installations ashore.

On 24–25 October 1944, the Japanese launched a major surface offensive from three directions to contest the landings at Leyte Gulf. While Admiral Jisaburo Ozawa's Mobile Force sailed south from Japan and drew the bulk of Admiral William Halsey's 3d Fleet off to the north, Admiral Shima's 2nd Striking Force, along with Admiral Shoji Nishimura's Force, attempted to force the Surigao Strait from the south. This drew Admiral Jesse B. Oldendorf's Bombardment Group south to meet that threat in the Battle of Surigao Strait. With Admiral Oldendorf's old battleships fighting in Surigao Strait and Halsey's 3rd Fleet scurrying north, Suwannee, with the other 15 escort carriers and 22 destroyers and destroyer escorts, formed the only Allied naval force operating off Leyte Gulf when Vice Admiral Takeo Kurita's 1st Striking Force sneaked through the unguarded San Bernardino Strait into the Philippine Sea.

===== Battle off Samar =====
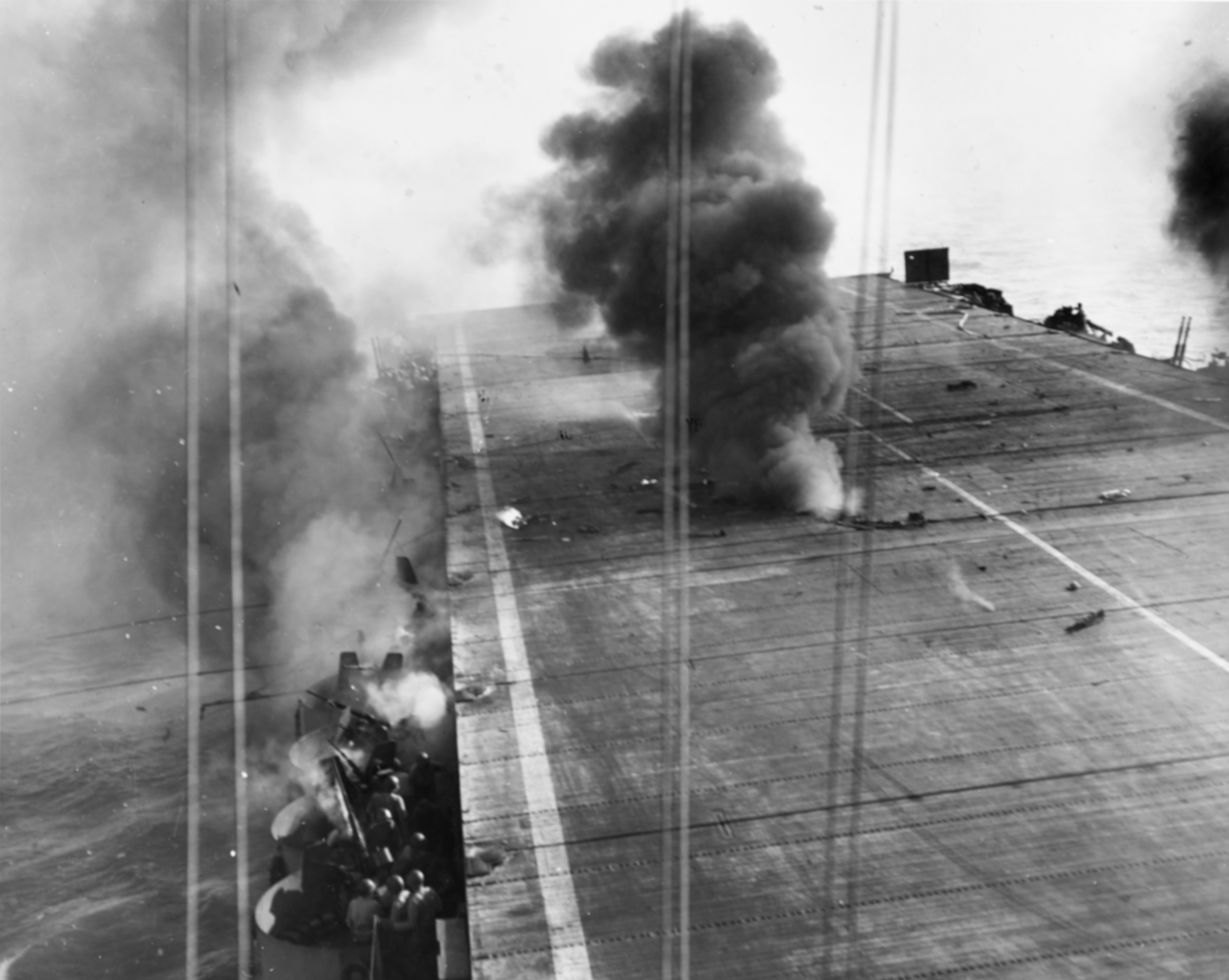
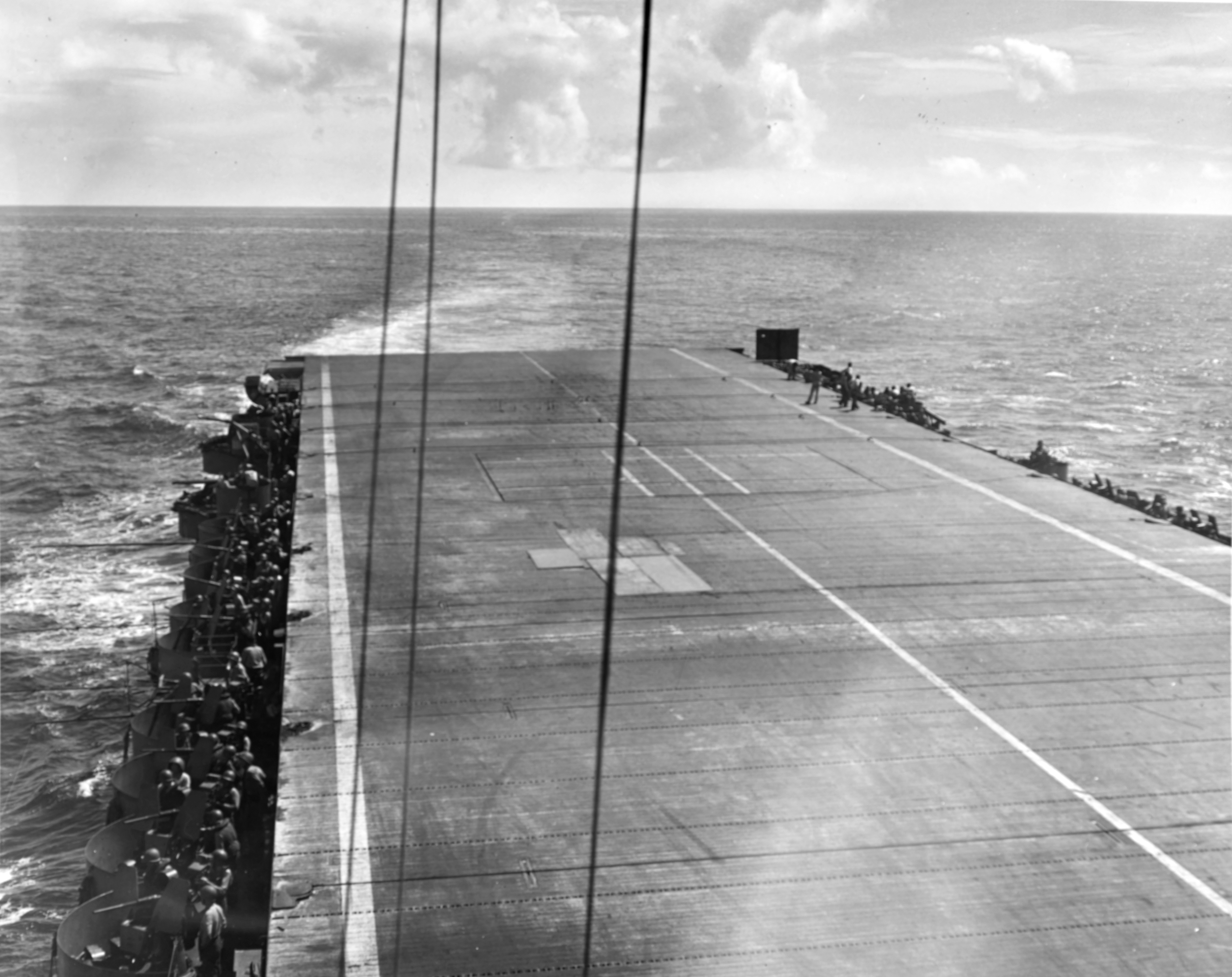
The Kamikaze hit on Suwannee, 25 October. And the repaired flight deck two hours later, with the ship about to resume air operations

Just before 07:00, on 25 October, one of Kadashan Bay's planes reported a Japanese force of four battleships, eight cruisers, and 11 destroyers. This force, Kurita's, immediately began a surface engagement with Rear Admiral Clifton Sprague's "Taffy 3", the northernmost group of escort carriers. Suwannee was much farther south as an element of Rear Admiral Thomas Sprague's "Taffy 1". Consequently, though she did not participate in the running surface Battle off Samar, her air group of TBMs and F6Fs carried out persistent attacks on Japanese capital ships.

Her problems came from another quarter. At 07:40, on 25 October, "Taffy 1" was attacked by land-based planes from Davao in the first deliberate kamikaze attack of the war. The first aircraft crashed into Santee; 30 seconds later, Suwannee shot down a kamikaze during his run on Petrof Bay. Suwannee's gunners soon shot down another enemy plane, then an engaged a third that was circling in the clouds at about 8,000 ft (2,400 m). They hit the aircraft, but it rolled over, dove at Suwannee and crashed into her at 08:04, about 40 ft (12 m) forward of the after elevator, opening a 10 ft (3.0 m) hole in her flight deck. The kamikaze's bomb compounded the fracture when it exploded between the flight and hangar decks, tearing a 25 ft (7.6 m) gash in the latter and causing a number of casualties.

Medical officer Lieutenant Walter B. Burwell wrote:

One of our corpsmen tending the wounded on the flight deck saw the plight of those isolated by fire on the forecastle. He came below to report that medical help was critically needed there. It seemed to me that we would have to try to get through to them. So he and I restocked our first aid bags with morphine syrettes, tourniquets, sulfa, Vaseline, and bandages, commandeered a fire extinguisher and made our way forward, dodging flames along the main deck. Along part of the way, we were joined by a sailor manning a seawater fire hose with fairly good pressure, and though the seawater would only scatter the gasoline fires away from us, by using the water and foam alternatively as we advanced, we managed to work our way up several decks, through passageways along the wrecked and burning combat information center and decoding area, through officers' country, and finally out on the forecastle. Many of the crew on the forecastle and the catwalks above it had been blown over the side by the explosions. But others trapped below and aft of the forecastle area found themselves under a curtain of fire from aviation gasoline pouring down from burning planes on the flight deck above. Their only escape was to leap aflame into the sea, but some were trapped so that they were incinerated before they could leap. By the time we arrived on the forecastle, the flow of gasoline had mostly consumed itself, and flames were only erupting and flickering from combustible areas of water and oil. Nonetheless, the decks and bulkheads were still blistering hot and ammunition in the small arms locker on the deck below was popping from the heat like strings of firecrackers. With each salvo of popping, two or three more panicky crew men would leap over the side, and we found that our most urgent task was to persuade those poised on the rail not to jump by a combination of physical restraint and reassurance that fires were being controlled and that more help was on the way. Most of the remaining wounded in the forecastle area were severely burned beyond recognition and hope.

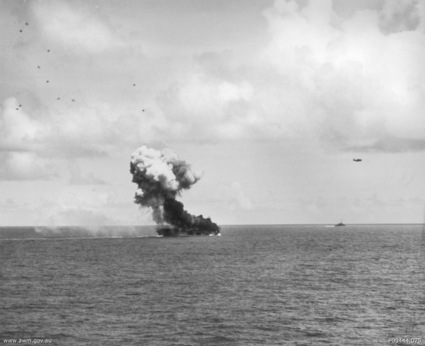
The moment a kamikaze struck Suwannee on 26 October, the second strike on the ship in two days

Within two hours, her flight deck was sufficiently repaired to enable the escort carrier to resume air operations. Suwannee's group fought off two more air attacks before 13:00; then steamed in a northeasterly direction to join Taffy 3 and launch futile searches for Kurita's rapidly retiring force.

Just after noon on 26 October, another group of kamikazes attacked Taffy 1. A Zero crashed into Suwannee's flight deck at 1240 and careened into a torpedo bomber which had just been recovered. The two planes erupted upon contact as did nine other planes on her flight deck. The resulting fire burned for several hours, but was finally brought under control. The casualties for 25–26 October were 107 dead and 160 wounded. The escort carriers put into Kossol Roads, in the Palaus, on 28 October, then headed for Manus, for upkeep, on 1 November.

==== 1945 ====
After five days in Seeadler Harbor, Suwannee got underway to return to the west coast for major repairs. She stopped at Pearl Harbor, overnight on 19–20 November, and arrived at Puget Sound Navy Yard, on 26 November. Her repairs were completed by 31 January 1945; and, after brief stops at Hunter's Point and Alameda, California, she headed west and back into the war. The escort carrier stopped at Pearl Harbor, from 16 to 23 February, at Tulagi, from 4–14 March, and at Ulithi, from 21 to 27 March, before arriving off Okinawa, on 1 April.

Her first assignment was close air support for the invasion troops, but, within a few days, she settled down to a routine of pounding the kamikaze bases at Sakishima Gunto. For the major portion of the next 77 days, her planes continued to deny the enemy the use of those air bases. Periodically, she put into the anchorage at Kerama Retto, to rearm and replenish, but she spent the bulk of her time in air operations at sea.

On 16 June, she headed for San Pedro Bay, in Leyte Gulf. She remained there for a week, then returned to the Netherlands East Indies, at Makassar Strait, to support the landings at Balikpapan, Borneo. The carrier reentered San Pedro Bay, on 6 July, and spent the next month there. On 3 August, she got underway for Okinawa, arriving in Buckner Bay, three days later.

Hostilities ended on 15 August, but Suwannee remained at Okinawa, for the next three weeks. On 7 September, Van Valkenburgh stood out of Buckner Bay, in company with Anthony, Wadsworth, Beale, and Ammen, as screen for the carriers Suwannee, Chenango, Cape Gloucester, and the cruiser Birmingham, bound for Japan, and occupation duty in the erstwhile enemy's waters. For the week that followed, the group operated off the coast of Kyushu, southwest of Nagasaki, Japan, while aircraft from the carriers patrolled the island and coast and assisted in locating mines in the clearance operations paving the way for entry into the harbor at Nagasaki. The ships had entered Nagasaki Harbor by 15 September, while Allied prisoners of war from New Zealand, were taken on board the hospital ship Haven. The carriers were sent there because of their medical facilities and doctors. Chenango left Nagasaki, on the morning of 15 September, with war prisoners. Crew members of Suwannee were given shore leave during their stay and observed the devastation of ground zero first hand. Suwannee and all the other ships in port experienced very difficult circumstances when typhoon Ida hit on 17 September. While moored between two buoys with two 1 1/4 inches (32 mm) steel cables and an 8 inches (20 cm) hawser both bow and stern, she lost all contact with the stern buoy and moved dangerously close to shore. The bow cables and hawser held and she remained safely in place by turning the screws to maintain position.

On 21 September, Suwannee departed Nagasaki, and remained at sea until she made a quick seven-hour stop at the outer harbor of Nagasaki, before heading toward Kobe. That stop was aborted because of a minefield on the path there, so they returned south to Wakayama, on 27 September. On 2 October, Suwannee's Captain, Charles C. McDonald, and Rear Admiral William Sample, who headed COMCARDIV 22 on board Suwannee, took off in a Martin PBM Mariner to maintain their flight qualifications and never returned. They were declared dead on 4 October, of the following year. They and the seven members of the flight crew were discovered in the wreckage of the aircraft on 19 November 1948, and their bodies were recovered.

During this time Suwannee was transferred from the 9th Fleet to the 5th Fleet. They remained at Wakayama, until the morning of 4 October, and ran into tropical storm Kate. They then spent a few days in the port of Kure, just south of Hiroshima, and then they returned near Wakayama, on 10 October, for "typhoon anchorage" as another storm, typhoon Louise, was approaching. They once again anchored in Wakayama, on 13 October, for about two days and then headed north to Tokyo, arriving on the evening of 18 October. About this time Suwannee received orders detaching them from the fleet and assigned her to Operation Magic Carpet.

The ship reached Saipan, around 15:00, on 28 October, and stayed just long enough, 15 hours, to load stores and 400 troops. Then on to Guam, arriving at 17:00, on 29 October, to load approximately 35 planes, for a total complement of around 70 planes, then on to Pearl Harbor. For her November participation in Operation Magic Carpet, she was part of a much larger contingency of ships. In the Pacific, all the 1,430,000 Navy, Coast Guard, and Marine personnel and the 1,360,000 Army troops, on 1 November, except those in occupation units were scheduled to be returned by June 1946. Engaged in the Pacific operations, as of 10 November, were 489 ships, having space for slightly under 700,000 passengers. Included were: 6 battleships, 7 large carriers, 4 Independence-class aircraft carriers, 45 escort carriers, 21 light cruisers, 164 troopships, 165 assault transports, 30 hospital transports, 7 converted Liberty ships and 40 miscellaneous craft.

After a stop in Hawaii, Suwannee was sent to Long Beach, and had a short dry-dock period. Then it was back to Operation Magic Carpet, on 4 December. This trip was to be a non-stop return to Okinawa, to pick up 1,500 troops on an overnight stop, and then return to Seattle. Because of bad weather they did not arrive in Okinawa until 21 December. In mid-January Suwannee unloaded many grateful troops in Los Angeles, and then headed north. After a few days off San Francisco, she headed for Pier 91, in Seattle, and then on to Bremerton. On 28 October, the carrier was placed in a reserve status with the 16th Fleet, at Boston, and just over two months later, on 8 January 1947, she was placed out of commission.

== Fate ==
Suwannee remained in reserve at Boston, for the next 12 years. She was designated an "Escort Helicopter Aircraft Carrier", CVHE-27, on 12 June 1955, while in reserve. Her name was struck from the Navy List on 1 March 1959. Her hulk was sold to the Isbrantsen Steamship Company, of New York City, on 30 November 1959, for conversion to merchant service. The project was subsequently canceled, and in May 1961, her hulk was resold to the J.C. Berkwit Company, also of New York City. She was finally scrapped in Bilbao, Spain, in June 1962.

== Awards ==
Suwannee and her embarked air units for the pertinent periods: VGS-27, VGF-27, VGS-30, VGF-28, CVEG-60, and CVEG-40, received the Presidential Unit Citation and 13 battle stars for her World War II service: North Africa occupation, Algeria-Morocco Landings, 8—11 November 1942, Anti-submarine action, planes S-10, S-11, and S-12, of VGS-27, 11 November 1942; Battle of Rennell Island, 29—30 January 1943; Gilbert Islands operation, 20 November—8 December 1943; Marshall Islands occupation: Occupation of Kwajalein and Majuro Atolls, 31 January—8 February 1944, and Eniwetok, 17—24 February 1944; Pacific Raids: Palau, Yap, Ulithi and Woleai, 30 March—1 April 1944; Hollandia operation, Aitape, Humboldt Bay, and Tanahmerah Bay, 22 April—5 May 1944; capture and occupation of Saipan, 23 June—11 July 1944; occupation and capture of Tinian, 12 July—1 August 1944; Morotai Landings, 15 September 1944; Leyte landings, 10 October—29 November 1944; Assault and occupation of Okinawa Gunto, 25 March—4 June 1945; and Balikpapan operation, 26 June—6 July 1945.

== Bibliography ==
- Cressman, Robert J. (11 June 2021). "Suwannee III (AO-33)". This article incorporates text from this source, which is in the public domain.
- Yarnall, Paul (15 June 2025). "USS SUWANNEE (ACV-27)". NavSource.
- Y'Blood, William T. (1987). The Little Giants: U.S. Escort Carriers Against Japan. Annapolis, Maryland: Naval Institute Press. ISBN 978-0-87021-275-8.
- "All Hands Naval Bulletin - Dec 1945 | PDF | Pacific War | United States Navy". All Hands. December 1945 – via Scribd.
