= USS Kuwana II =

Patrol vessel of the United States Navy

History

United States
- Name: USS Kuwana II
- Namesake: Previous name retained
- Builder: Electric Launch Company (Elco), Bayonne, New Jersey
- Completed: 1911
- Acquired: 2 June 1917
- Commissioned: 2 June 1917
- Stricken: 5 December 1918
- Fate: Returned to owner
- Notes: Operated as private motorboat Kuwana II 1911-1917and from 1918

General characteristics
- Type: Patrol vessel
- Tonnage: 34 gross register tons
- Length: 76 ft (23 m)
- Beam: 13 ft (4.0 m)
- Draft: 2 ft 9 in (0.84 m)
- Speed: 23 knots
- Complement: 8
- Armament: 1 × 1-pounder gun

USS Kuwana II (SP-594) was a United States Navy patrol vessel in commission from 1917 to 1918.

Kuwana II was built as a private motorboat of the same name by the Electric Launch Company (Elco) at Bayonne, New Jersey, in 1911. In 1917, the U.S. Navy leased her from her owner, Frank E. Masland of Philadelphia, Pennsylvania, for use as a section patrol boat during World War I. The Navy took delivery of her on 2 June 1917 and she was commissioned the same day as USS Kumara II (SP-594). She was enrolled in the Naval Coast Defense Reserve on 8 June 1917.

Assigned to the 4th Naval District, Kuwana II was based at Cold Spring Harbor, New Jersey. For the rest of World War I, she patrolled the Delaware Bay and Delaware River from Cape May, New Jersey, to Wilmington, Delaware, guarded the submarine net at Fort Delaware, and patrolled coastal waters near her base. She also served as a dispatch boat and training ship.

Kuwana II was stricken from the Navy List on 5 December 1918 and returned to Masland.
