= USS Cyrene =

Tender of the United States Navy

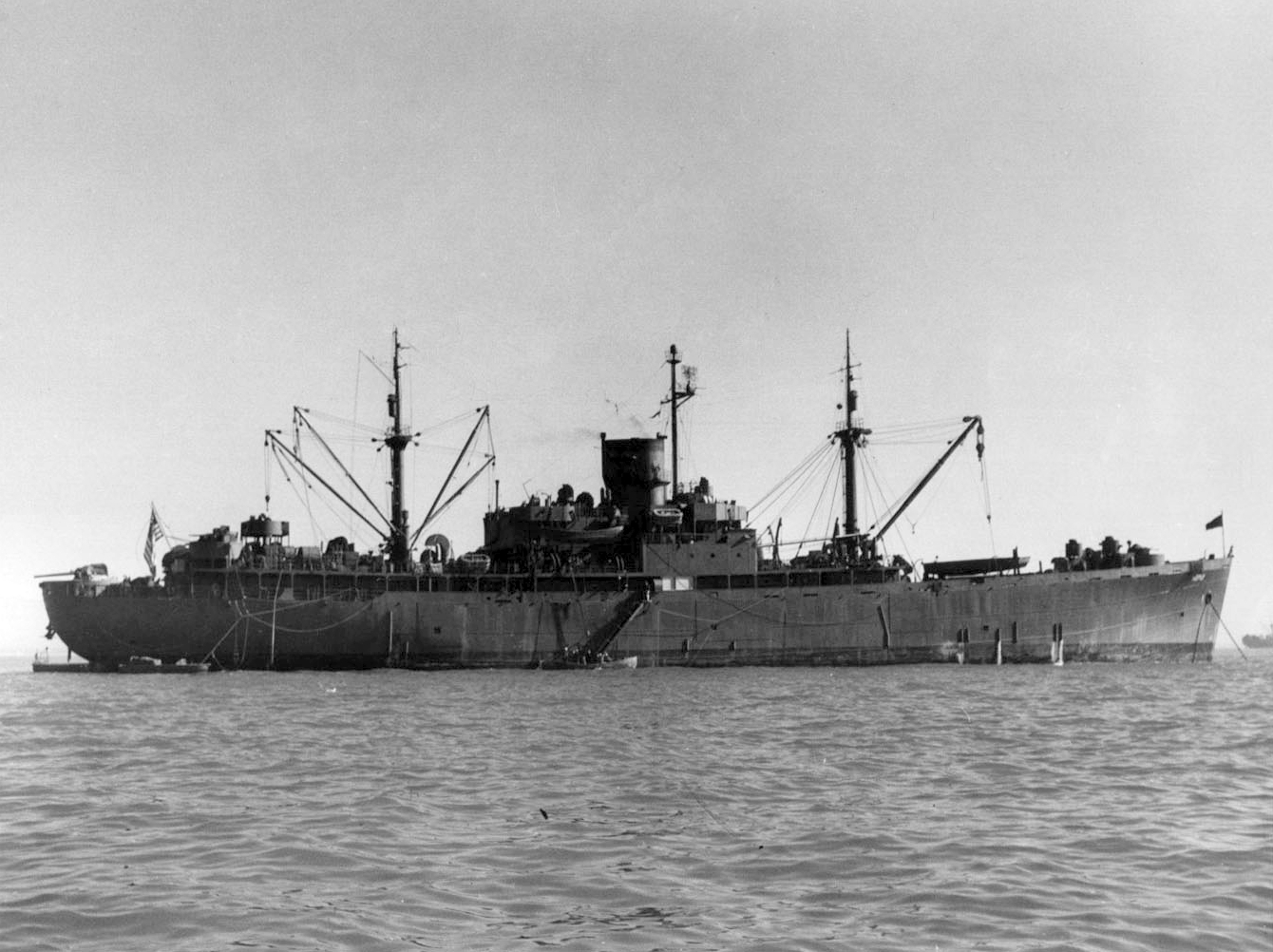
- USS Cyrene (AGP-13)

History

United States
- Name: Cape Farewell (1944); Cyrene (1944-1976)
- Namesake: Cape Farewell, Greenland; A nymph In Greek mythology
- Builder: Pusey and Jones Corporation, Wilmington, Delaware
- Laid down: as Cape Farewell (C1-A)
- Launched: 8 February 1944 as Cape Farewell
- Acquired: 28 April 1944
- Commissioned: 27 September 1944
- Decommissioned: 2 July 1946
- Renamed: Cyrene 27 September 1944
- Fate: Transferred to the Maritime Commission, 2 July 1946; Scrapped 1978

General characteristics
- Type: Motor torpedo boat tender
- Tonnage: 5,124 GRT, 2,851 Net
- Displacement: 5,236 long tons (5,320 t) light; 11,000 long tons (11,177 t) full load
- Length: 413 ft (126 m)
- Beam: 60 ft (18 m)
- Draft: 22 ft 6 in (6.86 m)
- Propulsion: Geared turbine engine, single propeller, 4,000 shp (2,983 kW)
- Speed: 14 knots (26 km/h; 16 mph)
- Complement: 289
- Armament: 1 × single 5"/38 caliber gun; 4 × twin 40 mm guns; 12 × single 20 mm guns

USS Cyrene (AGP-13) was a motor torpedo boat tender for the United States Navy. She was laid down as Cape Farewell, (Note: See SS Cape Farewell (AK-5073) for the C9 Military Sealift Command Ready Reserve Force Ship.) a Maritime Commission type (C1-A) hull under a Maritime Commission contract, at Pusey and Jones Corp., Wilmington, Delaware. Cyrene served in the Pacific from New Guinea to the Philippines from December 1944 to December 1945. The ship was decommissioned and placed in the Suisun Bay Reserve Fleet in July 1946 then withdrawn from the reserve fleet after sale to American Ship Dismantlers in December 1976.

== Construction ==
Cape Farewell, Maritime Commission hull 891, contract 1095, was launched 8 February 1944 sponsored by Mrs. G. L. Coppage. The ship was completed 28 April 1944, delivered to the Maritime Commission and immediately transferred to the Navy.

== Service history ==
The ship was acquired by the Navy on 28 April 1944 and commissioned as Cyrene 27 September 1944.

Departing Norfolk, Virginia, 10 November 1944, Cyrene arrived at Manus on 13 December to escort two squadrons of motor torpedo boats to Hollandia, New Guinea. She then sailed on convoy duty to Leyte, arriving 1 January 1945.

Cyrene served as tender for motor torpedo boats, and on 17 January 1945 became flagship for Commander, Motor Torpedo Boat Squadrons, 7th Fleet. The actor and comedian Don Rickles served as a Seaman First Class aboard Cyrene.

== Fate ==
After the war ended, the ship sailed from Samar on 21 December 1945 and arrived at San Francisco on 7 January 1946, where it reported to the 12th Naval District for repair work in decommissioning small craft. Cyrene was decommissioned 2 July 1946 and delivered to the War Shipping Administration for disposal and placed in the Suisun Bay Reserve Fleet the same day. The ship was purchased by American Ship Dismantlers, Inc., awarded under PD-X-1011 17 November 1976 for non transportation use at $85,166.82, and physically delivered to the company 7 December 1976 for scrapping.

One of her lifeboats is now in use at Rochester, England, where it has been converted into a live-aboard vessel.
