= USS Hilo =

Gunboat of the United States Navy

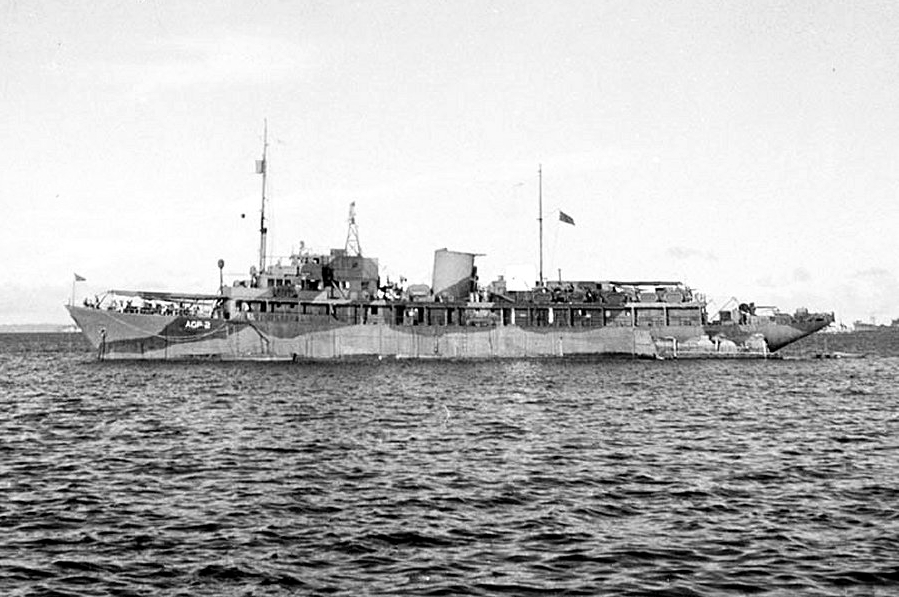
- USS Hilo

History

United States
- Name: Caroline
- Owner: Eldridge R. Johnson
- Builder: Bath Iron Works
- Yard number: 141
- Laid down: 1 September 1930
- Launched: 18 July 1931
- Completed: 28 September 1931 (Delivered)
- Identification: Official number: 231135; Signal & radio call letters: WDEC
- Fate: Sold in 1938

General characteristics (Caroline)
- Type: Motor yacht
- Tonnage: 1,839 GRT
- Length: 278 ft 11 in (85.01 m)
- Beam: 38 ft 3 in (11.66 m)
- Draft: 17 ft (5.2 m)
- Depth: 22.7 ft (6.9 m)
- Installed power: 2 × 150 kW (200 hp) Diesel electric generators; 1 × 50 kW (67 hp) Diesel electric generators
- Propulsion: 2 × 1,500 shp (1,100 kW) Cooper-Bessemer diesel engines; 2 screws
- Speed: 14.5 knots (16.7 mph; 26.9 km/h)
- Range: 25,000 nautical miles (29,000 mi; 46,000 km)
- Crew: 42

United States
- Name: Moana
- Owner: William B. Leeds
- Acquired: 1938
- Fate: Acquired by the US Navy, 28 November 1941

United States
- Name: USS Hilo
- Namesake: Hilo, Hawaii
- Acquired: 28 November 1941
- Commissioned: 11 June 1942
- Decommissioned: 3 March 1946
- Stricken: 20 March 1946
- Identification: Callsign: NAVZ
- Fate: Sold to Pillsbury & Martingnoni, San Francisco, California on 1 July 1946; Scrapped 1958

General characteristics (USS Hilo)
- Type: Motor torpedo boat tender
- Displacement: 2,350 long tons (2,390 t)
- Length: 278 ft 11 in (85.01 m)
- Beam: 38 ft 3 in (11.66 m)
- Draft: 17 ft (5.2 m)
- Installed power: 2 × 150 kW (200 hp) Diesel electric generators; 1 × 50 kW (67 hp) Diesel electric generators
- Propulsion: 2 × 1,500 shp (1,100 kW) Cooper-Bessemer diesel engines; 2 screws
- Speed: 14.5 knots (16.7 mph; 26.9 km/h)
- Complement: 105 officers and enlisted
- Armament: 1 × 3 in (76 mm)/50 cal dual purpose gun

USS Hilo (AGP-2) was a converted yacht that saw service as a motor torpedo boat tender in the United States Navy during World War II. It was originally the yacht Caroline built for Eldridge R. Johnson and launched 18 July 1931. Caroline was at the time the second largest yacht and largest American built Diesel yacht. It was built with a laboratory as well as palatial quarters and was loaned and equipped by Johnson for the Johnson-Smithsonian Deep-Sea Expedition of 1933 that explored the Puerto Rico Trench. The yacht was sold in 1938 to William B. Leeds and renamed Moana replacing an earlier Leeds yacht of the same name.

It was purchased by the US Navy in 1941 and commissioned as USS Hilo, first designated as Patrol Gunboat (PG) 58 and then functioning and designated as Motor Torpedo Boat Tender (AGP) 2 supporting the torpedo boats for the duration of World War II.

== Yacht Caroline ==
Caroline was built in 1931 by Bath Iron Works, Bath, Maine at a cost of 1.5 million dollars for the Victor Talking Machine Company founder Eldridge R. Johnson. The yacht's keel was laid 1 September 1930 as Bath's hull number 141 with launch on 18 July 1931 and delivery to the owner on 28 September 1931. The yacht, replacing a smaller yacht of the same name, was named for Johnson's mother, Caroline Reeves Johnson, and christened by his grand niece, Caroline Fenimore Fitler, also named for his mother. On registration Caroline was assigned official number 231135 and the signal and radio call letters WDEC.

=== Description ===
The yacht was designed by Henry J. Gielow's company with unusually large owner's quarters, extending the full width amidships with two baths, seven guest staterooms, quarters for two maids and two valets, and a crew of forty. The guest staterooms, all with private bath, were aft with those on port and starboard sides connected by 7 ft (2.1 m) sliding doors enabling them to be connected into larger suites. On the main deck was a 36 ft (11.0 m) by 26 ft (7.9 m) living room with a fireplace forward. Aft was a partially sheltered deck with a lobby and elevator connecting the owner's quarters below and a laboratory on the deck above on the upper deck. Aft of that were a smoking room and 29 ft (8.8 m) by 26 ft (7.9 m) dining room with a dressing room and shower for owner and guests, quarters for the chief engineer, dining room for the maids and galley between smoking room and dining room. Captain and radio operators had quarters on the upper deck where there was also a radio room and a lounge and observation room as well as the laboratory. The pilot house and chart room occupied the bridge deck.

Caroline had a 235 ft (71.6 m) waterline length with 278 ft 11 in (85.0 m) length overall, 38 ft (11.6 m) beam, draft of 15 ft (4.6 m) (Navy 17 ft (5.2 m)) and displacement tonnage of 2,350. Registry information showed 1,839 GRT, 247.3 ft (75.4 m) length, 38.2 ft (11.6 m) breadth and depth of 22.7 ft (6.9 m) with a crew of forty-two. She was the largest Diesel powered yacht built in America and the second largest private yacht in America at that time.

Power was provided by two Cooper-Bessemer 1,500-horsepower diesel engines driving two screws with a maximum speed of 14 knots. Fuel capacity was sufficient for a cruising range of 25,000 nautical miles (29,000 mi; 46,000 km). In addition the yacht had one of the largest Sperry Gyroscope Company gyroscopic-stabilizers built for a private vessel. The gyroscope wheel itself weighed 88,000 pounds (40,000 kg) spun by a 210-horsepower Diesel-electric motor at 13,000 revolutions a minute and taking one and a half hours to reach that maximum speed. The device was designed to counter five and a half degrees of roll. The total weight of the two engines and gyroscope was approximately 400,000 pounds (180,000 kg) Two 150-kilowatt and one 50-kilowatt diesel–electric generating sets provided electrical power. A carbon dioxide fire extinguishing system was installed for fire protection.

=== History ===
Johnson offered the use of the Caroline for scientific research including a 1932 archeological expedition to South America and Easter Island. In October 1932 Johnson equipped and offered for use the yacht for what was expected to be a series of expeditions in cooperation with the Smithsonian Institution to be known as the Johnson-Smithsonian Deep-Sea Expedition. The first was to the Puerto Rico Trench embarking investigators from several disciplines and government agencies and institutions interested in oceanographic work. Those included the Naval Research Laboratory, Agriculture and Commerce Departments as well as The American Museum of Natural History, Carnegie Institution and the Oceanographic Institution of Woods Hole.

The expedition, under the leadership of Dr. Paul Bartsch of the Smithsonian, sailed from New York on 21 January 1933. In addition to the scientific party Johnson and his son, E. R. Fenimore Johnson who had helped prepare the yacht, and invited guest went with the expedition. Aside from description and addition of new species to collections three lines of echo soundings were gathered across the trench with the Navy echo sounding device operated by US Navy seaman Thomas Townsend Brown and water samples were taken at various depths. E. R. Fenimore Johnson assisted with the sounding work and had his own interests in ocean research, equipping his own yacht, Elsie Fenimore for such work. Both he and Elsie Fenimore served in World War II in mine warfare work. Further expeditions did not take place due to the economic depression and the European situation.

Caroline was engaged in pleasure cruising as well as science. One example was a 1935 cruise in which Douglas Fairbanks and Lady Ashley and other film personalities, departing at Tahiti, were Johnson's guests aboard on a cruise in which the yacht continued to Suva, the Solomon Islands, Japan, China, and the East Indies before continuing to Southampton. Johnson loved the Caroline and the Johnson Victrola Museum, Dover, Delaware, features a song written about the yacht played with 78-rpm records on authentic Victor Talking Machines.

By March 1937, with the earlier 171 ft (52.1 m) Caroline (Note: This yacht, official number 225885, was sold to quack John R. Brinkley of Del Rio, Texas, renamed Doctor Brinkley which was purchased by the Navy to serve during World War II as USS Jade (PY-17).) being sold to Joseph M. Shenck of Los Angeles, Johnson chartered his later Caroline for the winter cruising season.

== Yacht Moana ==
In 1938 Caroline was advertised as Caroline II for sale and bought by William B. Leeds who named the yacht Moana, replacing a smaller yacht, 159.9 ft (48.7 m) (Official number 226065/KGCK), of the same name. (Note: On line references to celebrities such as Errol Flynn and Ernest Hemingway aboard Leeds' Moana predating 1938 refer to the smaller, earlier yacht. The same celebrities may be found in references to events after 1938 and those would be aboard ex-Caroline.)

== World War II Pacific Theatre operations ==
Moana was purchased by the Navy on 28 November 1941 and converted to Navy use at Craig Shipbuilding, Long Beach, California, she commissioned as USS Hilo (PG-58) on 11 June 1942. One of the first ships to be used as a motor torpedo boat tender, Hilo departed Long Beach, California, to load supplies at San Diego, California on 19 June and sailed for Pearl Harbor on 28 June.

The ship arrived Pearl Harbor on 5 July 1942, and was immediately sent to Palmyra Island to tend to torpedo boat squadron 1B (consisting of PT-21, PT-23, PT-25, and PT-26). Hilo remained in the vicinity fueling and providing supplies to the boats then under training until returning to Pearl Harbor again on 4 October. She was soon underway, however, steaming by way of Palmyra Island to Canton Island, where she arrived on 29 October. There she took on passengers and proceeded to Funafuti, arriving on 2 November 1942 with Squadron 1B.

=== Tending torpedo boats ===
The ship remained at Funafuti until 25 November, tending torpedo boats and engaging in rescue operations as American forces prepared for the coming assault on the Gilberts and Marshalls. On 12 November the Hilo and other units from Funafuti rescued Eddie Rickenbacker and the crewmen of a crashed B-17 after they were adrift at sea in rubber boats for 21-days. She next sailed for Noumea, New Caledonia, arriving on 2 December, and from there escorted four PT boats to Cairns, Queensland, where she moored on 11 December.

=== Setting up her base in New Guinea ===
Hilo was then sent to set up the first torpedo boat base in New Guinea, at Milne Bay, arriving on 17 December. Commencing operations soon after their arrival, Hilo's boats contributed to the hard-fought Buna-Gona campaign in New Guinea as allied forces began their return to the Philippines. The boats fired at Japanese ashore, destroyed barges loaded with men and supplies, and even fought submarines in support of the troops ashore. On 13 January 1943, her designation was changed to AGP-2.

In February 1943, Hilo explored the coast for a suitable advance PT boat base, and by the 28th had established one at Kana Kope. The torpedo boats stationed there with Hilo soon had a chance to fight, as Japanese efforts to reinforce their Lae and Salamaua garrisons led to the Battle of the Bismarck Sea from 2–4 March. The tender remained at Kana Kope until late April, when she began to move up the New Guinea coast to various anchorages. As Hilo's torpedo boats continued to take part in the successful New Guinea campaign, Hilo herself underwent many air raids and endured extremes of climate and disease before being relieved on 20 October. The tender sailed to Sydney, Australia, arriving on 13 November, and sailed again on 9 February 1944 for Milne Bay.

=== Moving her base to New Britain ===
Hilo again took up her tending duties in the New Guinea area and was transferred to Talasea, New Britain on 26 March. She remained there until 4 June tending two squadrons of torpedo boats, after which she shifted her operations to Mios Woendi and became a command ship for torpedo boat operations in the U.S. 7th Fleet her tender equipment removed. The ship remained there until 6 November.

=== Supporting PT-boat operations in the Philippines ===
With the invasion of the Philippines underway, Hilo sailed to Leyte Gulf, arriving on 12 November. During the next months the ships in the Gulf were under almost constant air attack. Hilo was nearly hit on 26 November as kamikaze attacked San Juanico Straits; one kamikaze crashed some 250 yd (230 m) ahead of the tender. Hilo's gunners scored several kills during this period.

Commander, Motor Torpedo Boat Squadrons, 7th Fleet, shifted his flag to Cyrene on 16 January, and for the next nine months Hilo was occupied with passenger voyages to various islands, including Mios Woendi and the Palaus. She departed Samar on 26 October 1945 for the United States via Eniwetok and Pearl Harbor. Hilo received four battle stars for service in World War II.

== Post-war decommissioning ==
Hilo arrived on 1 December and was decommissioned on 3 March 1946. The ship entered the Suisun Bay National Defense Reserve Fleet on 30 June 1946 and was sold on 6 November 1947 by the United States Maritime Commission to Pillsbury & Martingnoni, San Francisco, California. The ship was scrapped in 1958.
