= USS Shannon =

Robert H. Smith-class destroyer minelayer

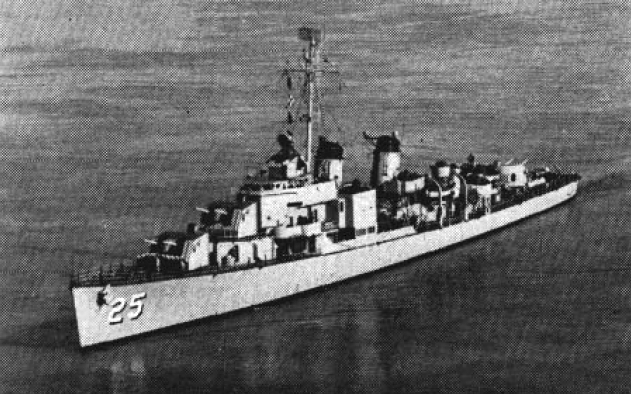
- Shannon

History

United States
- Name: Shannon
- Namesake: Harold D. Shannon
- Builder: Bath Iron Works
- Laid down: 14 February 1944
- Launched: 24 June 1944
- Commissioned: 8 September 1944
- Decommissioned: 24 October 1955
- Stricken: 1 November 1970
- Fate: Sold for scrap, May 1973

General characteristics
- Class & type: Robert H. Smith-class destroyer
- Displacement: 2,200 tons
- Length: 376 ft 6 in (114.76 m)
- Beam: 40 ft 10 in (12.45 m)
- Draft: 18 ft 10 in (5.74 m)
- Speed: 34 knots (63 km/h; 39 mph)
- Complement: 363 officers and enlisted
- Armament: 6 x 5 in (127 mm)/38 cal. guns; 12 x 40 mm guns; 8 x 20 mm cannons; 2 x depth charge tracks; 4 x depth charge projectors

USS Shannon (DD-737/DM-25/MMD-25) was a Robert H. Smith-class destroyer minelayer in the United States Navy.

== Namesake ==
Harold Douglas Shannon was born on 16 September 1892 in Chicago, Illinois. He enlisted in the United States Marine Corps on 17 October 1913 and served in Mexico in 1914. On 5 July 1917, he was appointed Second Lieutenant in the Marine Corps Reserve and was subsequently commissioned Second Lieutenant in the Marine Corps. From October 1917 through the end of World War I, he served in France and was awarded the Silver Star and the Croix de Guerre for his actions during the Belleau Wood Campaign. In October 1919, he returned to the United States.

Over the next 20 years, he served at various stations in the United States and completed tours in Santo Domingo, Nicaragua, and the Panama Canal Zone. In July 1941, he was transferred from San Diego, California to Pearl Harbor; and, in September 1941, to Midway Island. Shannon was promoted to Colonel in May 1942. He was awarded the Navy Distinguished Service Medal for his leadership of the 6th Defense Battalion during the Battle of Midway (4 June 1942 – 7 Jun 1942). He is shown in John Ford's 1942 film, The Battle of Midway, attending a service for deceased American servicemen at the conclusion of the battle.

Colonel Shannon remained on Midway into August 1942. He was then transferred to Pearl Harbor; and, in October 1942, to San Diego, California, where he died on 16 February 1943 from pneumonia.

== Construction and commissioning ==
Shannon (DD-737) was laid down on 14 February 1944 by the Bath Iron Works, Bath, Maine and launched on 24 June 1944; sponsored by Mrs. Harold D. Shannon The ship was reclassified DM-25 on 19 July 1944; and commissioned on 8 September 1944.

== Service history ==
=== Transfer to Pacific ===
Completing shakedown in the Bermuda area in late October, Shannon was ordered to overtake convoy GUS-54 and deliver election ballots before proceeding to Norfolk, Virginia for availability. She accomplished her mission; completed the yard work; and, on 21 November, sailed for the Pacific. On 25 November, she rescued two crewmen of a downed scout plane launched from the cruiser USS Tuscaloosa. She arrived in the Panama Canal Zone on 27 November.

From there, she continued on to California and Hawaii. On 27 January, Shannon, flagship of Mine Division (MinDiv) 7 and a unit of Task Force 51, departed Pearl Harbor for Eniwetok, Saipan, and Iwo Jima. At the latter island, on 19 February, she conducted antisubmarine patrols as Marines landed; then, during the afternoon, she moved in to provide fire support. For the next five days, she rotated between those duties; then returned to Saipan to escort reinforcement and resupply echelons to the embattled island.

She returned to Iwo Jima on 3 March and resumed duty-night illumination, harassing fire, and call fire- in support of the 4th Marine Division for another five days. On 8 March, she sailed for Ulithi; and, on 19 March, she left the Western Carolines for the Ryukyu Islands and Operation Iceberg, the invasion of Okinawa.

=== Okinawa ===
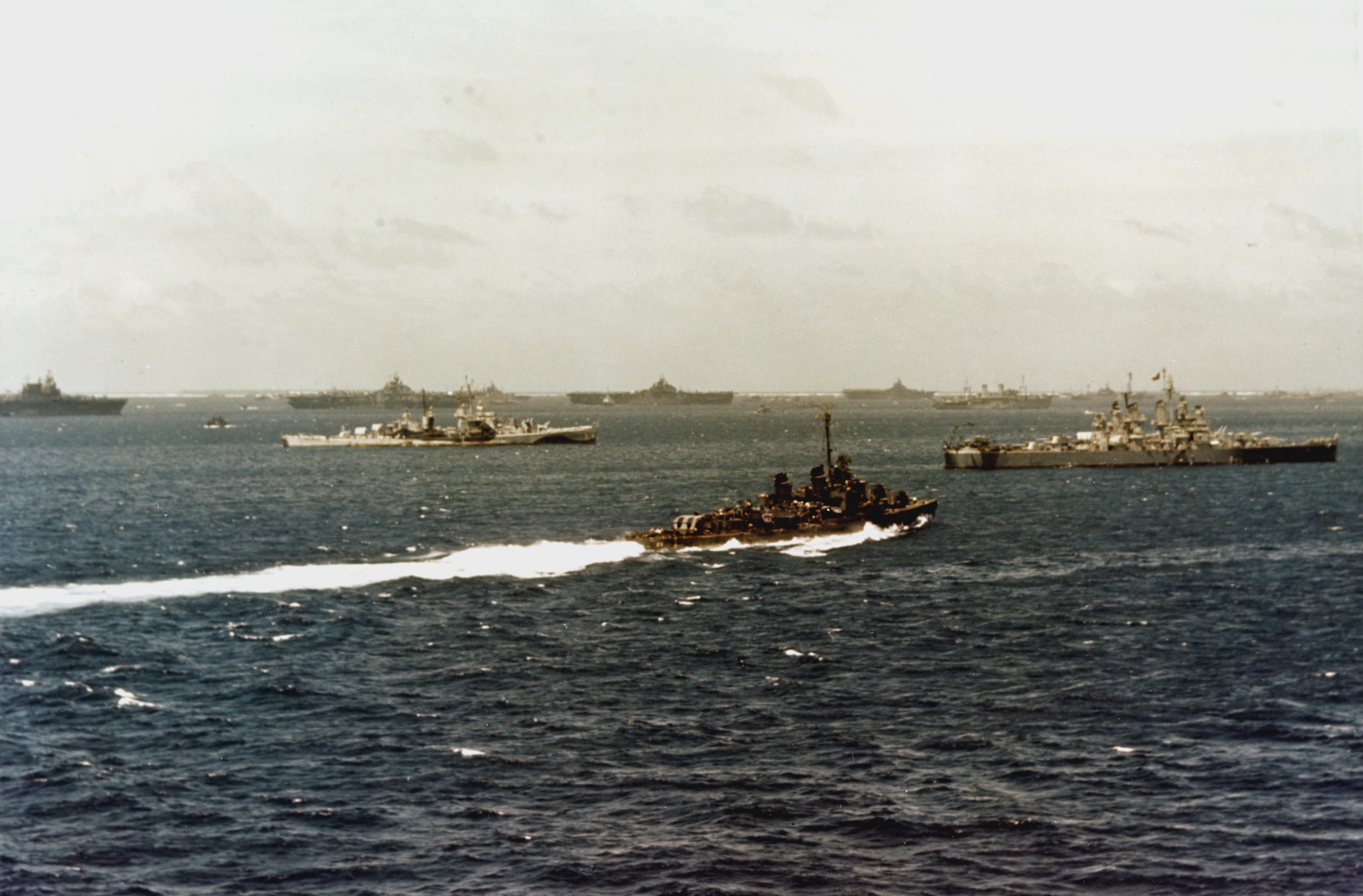
Shannon steams past task forces gathering for the Okinawa Operation, circa March 1945. Location is probably Ulithi Atoll.

Shannon arrived off Kerama Retto, an island group west of Okinawa, on 25 March and covered minesweeping units and underwater demolition teams until that base was secured. She then protected the minesweepers as they prepared the way for the landings on Okinawa. On 1 April, when the troops were landed on the Hagushi beaches, she patrolled to the east of Kerama Retto; then moved to the southern coast of Okinawa to screen the demonstration landings there. Further screening duties followed; and, on the 4th, she retired to the rear area. On 15 April, she returned to Okinawa and resumed screening duties. On 21 April, she commenced anti-small-boat patrols off southeastern Okinawa. She alternated that duty with radar picket duty until mid-June with interruptions only to cover minesweepers in the Tori Shima area on 11 May and in the Iheya Shima area from 30 May to 3 June.

From mid-June through the end of July, Shannon accompanied minesweeping units as they continued sweeping operations in the immediate Okinawa area and in the East China Sea. During the first part of August, she was at Buckner Bay for availability. On 12 August, she resumed operations with the minesweepers which continued until the war ended on 15 August.

=== Yellow Sea ===
After the cessation of hostilities in the Pacific, Shannon moved into the Yellow Sea with mine units to clear the fields off Korea. On 7 September, she got underway for Japan; and, into November, she assisted the minesweeping detachments as they cleared the sea-lanes to the major ports of that country. Then, having relinquished flagship duties in October, she headed back for the United States. After stops in Hawaii and on the west coast, she continued on to the east coast to join the Atlantic Fleet.

=== Post World War II and fate ===
Arriving in Chesapeake Bay in April 1946, she conducted limited operations under ComDesLant and Com-SubLant into June. She then proceeded to Charleston, South Carolina for duty in MinDiv 2. During 1947, her operations were extended; and, that summer, she escorted the escort carrier Palau on a goodwill visit to Liberia. Availability and limited operations followed that cruise; then, from November 1947 into August 1948, she remained immobilized at Charleston. In August 1948, she resumed operations with Mine Force, Atlantic Fleet which she continued for the next seven years. During that time, she participated in various exercises—type, fleet, and international; conducted midshipmen cruises; and deployed to the Mediterranean Sea once, from September 1950 to January 1951. Ordered inactivated in 1955, she joined the Charleston Group, Atlantic Reserve Fleet, on 7 July and was decommissioned on 24 October 1955. Reclassified MMD-25 on 14 August 1968, she remained in the reserve fleet until struck from the Navy list on 1 November 1970. She was subsequently sold for scrapping to the Boston Metals Company, Baltimore, Maryland, and was delivered to that firm in May 1973.

Shannon earned four battle stars during World War II.
