= Motor torpedo boat tender =

Ship used to service fast patrol vessels during WWII and the Vietnam War

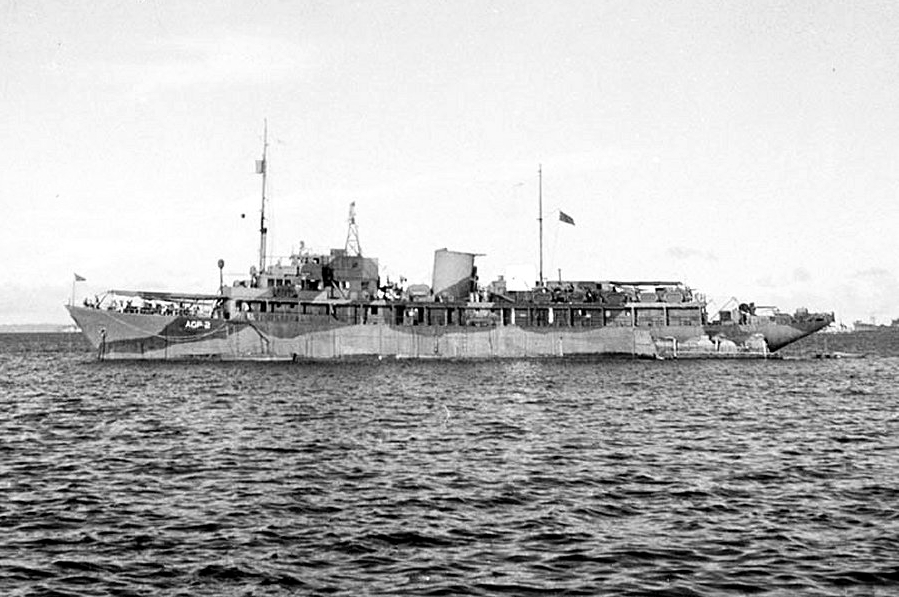
USS Hilo (AGP-2) in 1944

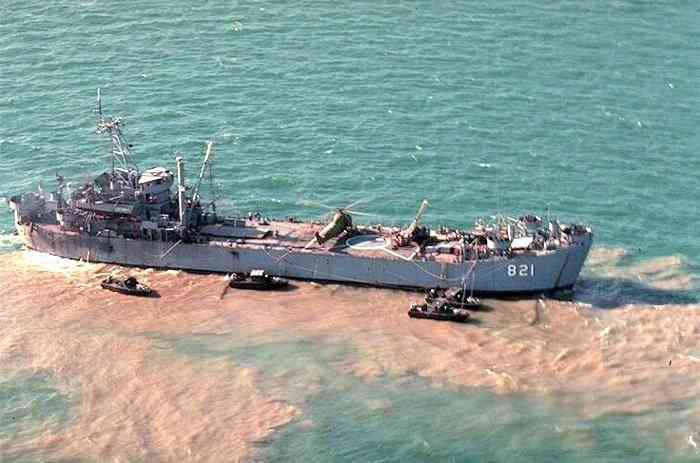
USS Harnett County (AGP-821) in South Vietnamese waters

Motor torpedo boat tender is a type of ship used by the U.S. Navy during World War II and Vietnam War. The motor torpedo boat tender's task was to act as a tender in remote areas for patrol boats (PT-boats) and to provide the necessary fuel and provisions for the torpedo boats she was responsible for. The type finds its root in the torpedo boat tender, developed in the 19th century.

This type of ship was classified as "AGP" and is sometimes called a "patrol craft tender."

== See also ==
- USS Hilo (AGP-2) example with a description of the functioning of this type of vessel
- USS Cyrene (AGP-13) upon which comedian Don Rickles served during WWII
