= USS Ramapo =

Oiler of the United States Navy

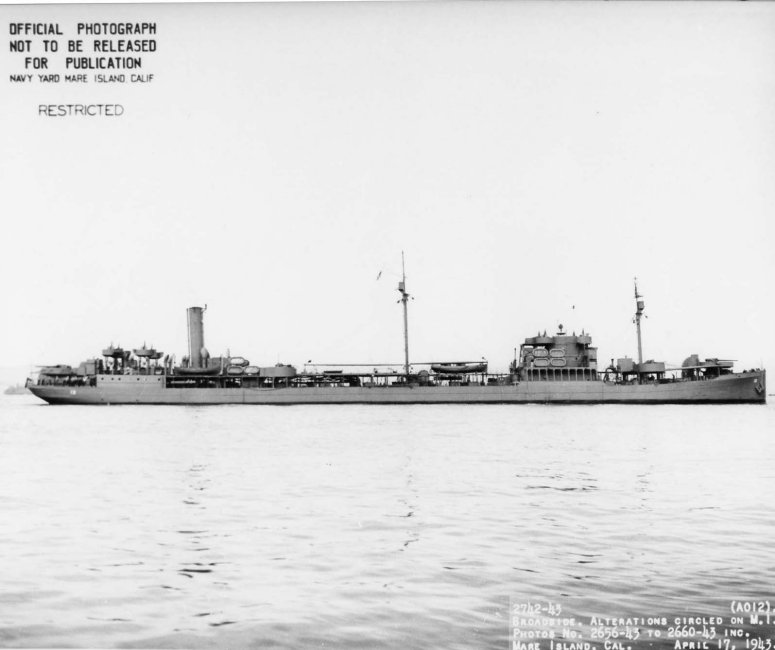

History

United States
- Name: Ramapo
- Namesake: Ramapo River
- Builder: Newport News Shipbuilding & Dry Dock Co.
- Laid down: 16 January 1919
- Launched: 11 September 1919
- Commissioned: 15 November 1919
- Decommissioned: 10 January 1946
- Stricken: 21 January 1946
- Fate: Sold into commercial service, 1948

General characteristics
- Class & type: Patoka Replenishment oiler
- Displacement: 16,800 long tons (17,070 t) (full)
- Length: 477 ft 10 in (145.64 m)
- Beam: 60 ft (18 m)
- Draft: Max. 29 ft (8.8 m)
- Speed: 11.2 knots (20.7 km/h; 12.9 mph)
- Capacity: 70,000 barrels
- Complement: 90
- Armament: 2 × single 5"/38 caliber guns; 4 × twin 20 mm guns

USS Ramapo (AO-12), was a Patoka-class replenishment oiler. It was built under U.S. Shipping Board contract, was laid down on 16 January 1919 by the Newport News Shipbuilding & Dry Dock Co., Newport News, Virginia; launched on 11 September 1919; and commissioned on 15 November 1919.

== Service history ==
Assigned to Caribbean shuttle runs after commissioning, Ramapo carried petroleum products from Port Arthur, Texas, to Guantanamo Bay and the Canal Zone until April 1920. Through 1922, Ramapo was employed to deliver fuel to ships and bases on the US Gulf and East coasts and in European waters. Transferred to the Pacific in 1922, Ramapo carried oil to ships and stations of the Pacific Fleet and made occasional trips to the Canal Zone and to the east coast until mid-1928, when the tanker began to supply the Asiatic Fleet on a regular schedule. Beginning on 21 June, she carried oil from San Pedro to the Philippines and China and, for the next nine years, averaged four round-trips annually. En route she performed collateral duties as a survey ship and collected data in central and western Pacific island groups for the Hydrographic Office.

On 7 February 1933, while cruising across the Pacific Ocean from Manila to San Diego, the ship encountered the tallest rogue wave ever recorded at the time, measuring 34 metres (112 ft) in height.

In late 1937, Ramapo briefly interrupted her transpacific runs to discharge oil to ships and stations in the Aleutians, then resumed runs to East Asia, continuing them until the spring of 1941 when she was shifted to Hawaiian shuttle service. At Pearl Harbor when the Japanese attacked on 7 December, the tanker returned to San Pedro and made two round-trips to Bora Bora before resuming Alaskan shuttle runs. Arriving at Kodiak on 29 July 1942 on her first such run since 1937, she plied between Port Townsend and various mainland and Aleutian stations throughout World War II. Ramapo received one battle star for World War II service.

The Ramapo is credited with the rescue of the entire crew of the USS Wasmuth (DMS-15) on 27 December 1942. Wasmuth was escorting a convoy through a heavy Alaskan storm when two depth charges were wrenched from their tracks by the pounding sea, fell over the side, and exploded beneath the ship's fantail. The blasts carried away part of the ship's stern and the ship began to founder; in the gale, the pumps could not make headway against the inexorably rising water below. Despite the heavy sea, Ramapo came alongside the foundering Wasmuth. For three and a half hours, the tanker remained with the sinking high-speed minesweeper, battling the waves while successfully transferring his crew and two passengers.

The Ramapo completed her last run of the war at Seattle on 23 September 1945. On the 27th, she steamed south and on the 30th reported at San Francisco for inactivation. Decommissioned on 10 January 1946, Ramapo was struck from the list on 21 January and transferred to the Maritime Commission on 1 July.
