= Electric Launch Company =

US boat building and electric motor company

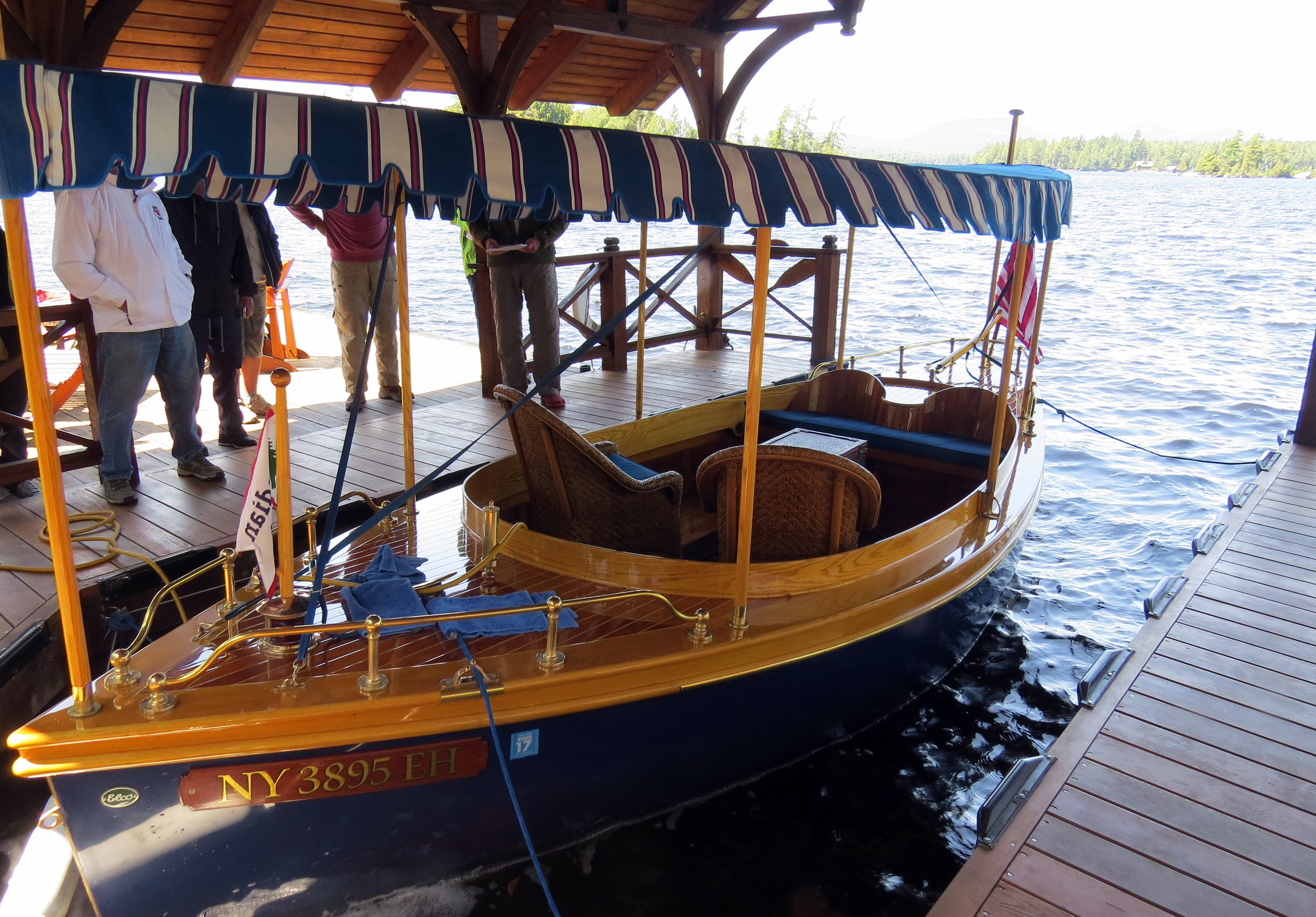
An Elco Electric Launch on Raquette Lake in the Adirondacks

The Electric Launch Company, later renamed Elco Motor Yachts ("Elco"), is an American boat building and electric motor company that has operated from 1893 to 1949 and from 1987 to the present.

== History ==
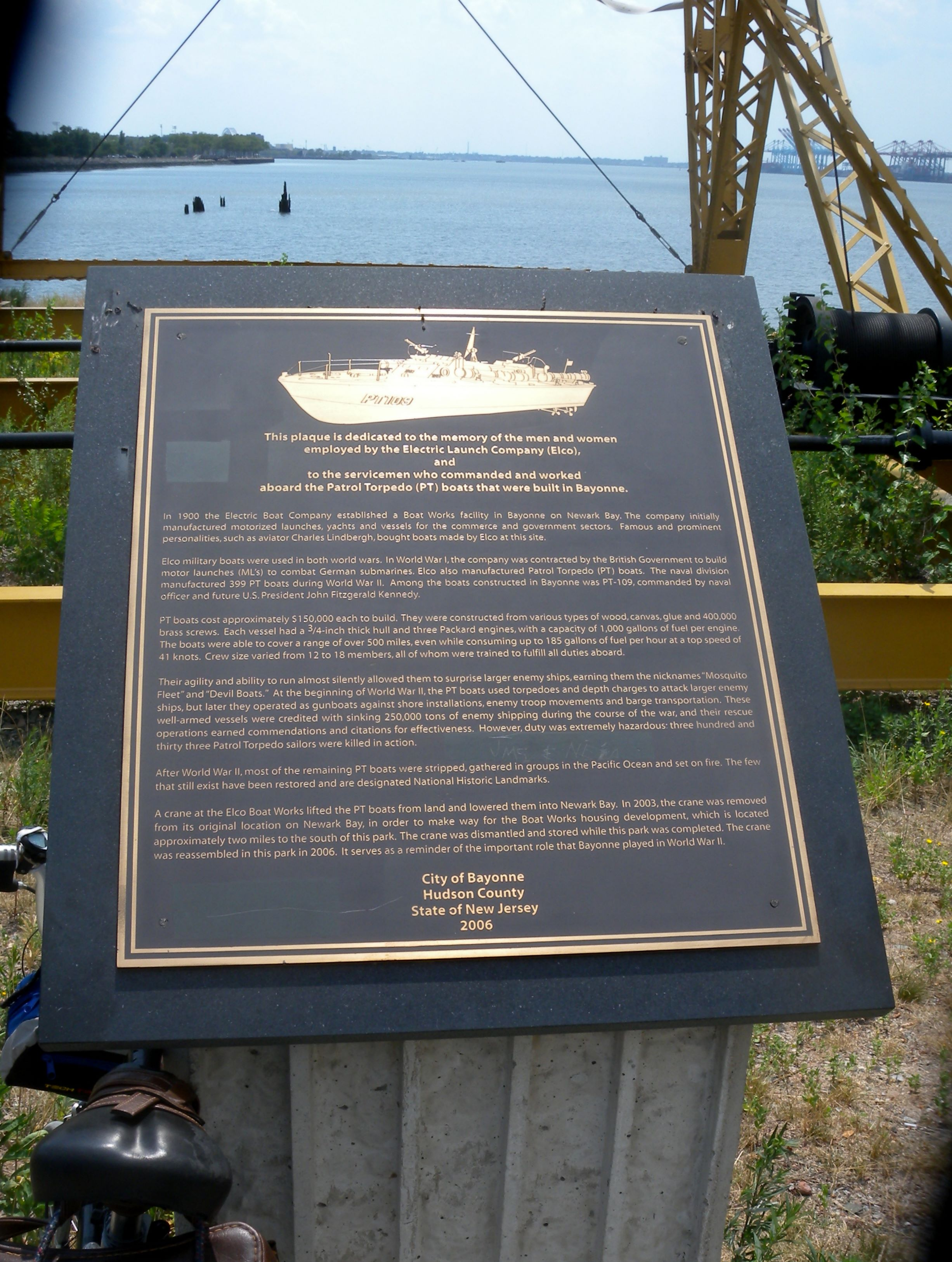
Plaque in Bayonne commemorates Elco

Elco first made its mark at the World's Columbian Exposition of 1893 in Chicago. Fifty-five launches, each 36 feet long and powered by battery-driven electric motors, carried over a million passengers.

In 1899 Isaac Rice, president of the Electric Storage Battery Company and owner of Electric Boat Company, now Electro-Dynamic Company, (both suppliers to Elco), acquired Elco as a subsidiary of his new Electric Boat Company. Elco built a new boatyard in Bayonne, New Jersey soon afterward. Previously, Elco boats had been built in subcontracted facilities.

By 1900, electric-powered pleasure boats outnumbered the combined number of boats powered by steam and explosive engines (as gasoline-powered motors were called). By 1910, the advantages of the range and power of gasoline came to dominate the market and Elco converted to motor boats.

The company built the first diesel powered yacht in America, Idealia, built during 1911 and launched in 1912. Idealia was owned by the company into 1916 and used for demonstrating the application of two stroke diesel engines in yachts. On 22 October 1913 under ELCO corporate manager Henry R. Sutphen Idealia performed a trial on the Hudson River witnessed by naval engineers and architects on a run of about sixty miles from the Columbia Yacht Club at 86th Street to Croton Point and back. The original Idealia installation was a reversible, air started, two cycle engine with six working cylinders and one two stage air compression cylinder that was rated at 150 horsepower at 550 revolutions per minute. The original engine was replaced by a NELSECO 120 horsepower four cycle engine by February 1915.

During World War I, the company built five hundred and eighty 80-foot submarine chasers (aka Motor Launches) for the British Admiralty, and 448 110-foot submarine chasers and 284 boats of other types for the US Navy.

Between the wars, it introduced the 26-foot Cruisette, a cabin cruiser which became successful. This was followed in the 1930s with 30-foot to 57-foot Veedettes and Flattops.

During World War II, Elco formed the Elco Naval Division in Bayonne, New Jersey. Nearly 400 Elco PT boats were produced for the U.S. Navy. After experimentation, the first PT boat built in any quantity was the 73-foot type. Later 77-foot and 80-foot types were built. More 80-foot Elco boats were built than any other type of US motor torpedo boat.

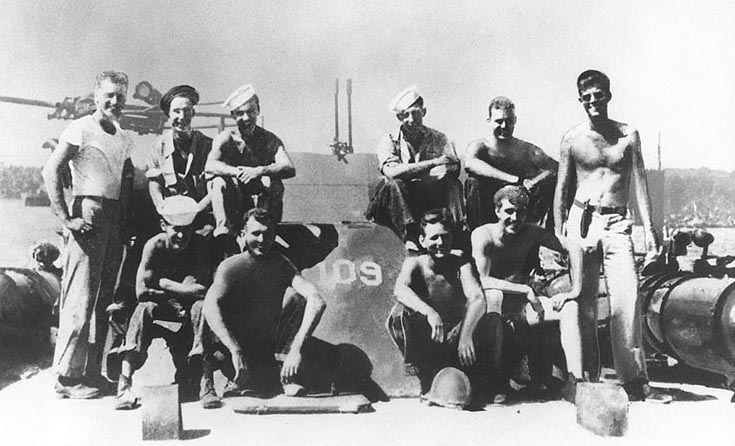
Lt (jg). Kennedy (right) with crew of PT-109

Perhaps the most notable 80-foot PT boat was PT-109, commanded by future president John F. Kennedy. Even though 85' Elco crash rescue boats were substituted in the 1963 film PT 109, the "Elco" script logo can be seen on the cockpit throttle housing in several scenes in the picture.

At the end of the war, the company merged with its sister company, Electric Boat, under John Jay Hopkins. In 1949, Electric Boat decided to focus on government contracts for submarines, and Elco was closed until 1987.

== Today ==
Today Elco produces hand-crafted replicas of some of its classic launches in Athens, New York. The company also still makes electric motors, mainly used to repower sailboats and heavy displacement powerboats as a replacement for diesel engines. Their EP Motors range in power from 1–35 kW, which is the diesel equivalent of 2–70 hp. Elco has also worked on recent projects with Hunter Marine to outfit some of their yachts with Elco motors and a combination of solar panels and wind turbines.

== See also ==
- Fairmile Marine
- Vospers
- British Power Boat Company
- Electro-Dynamic Company - fellow former subsidiary of Electric Boat which manufactured electric motors and generators
- Submarine Boat Company - fellow former subsidiary of Electric Boat which ran a shipyard during WWI producing steel cargo vessels, and slightly beyond
- New London Ship and Engine Company sister company
