= Melville Motor Torpedo Boat Squadrons Training Center =

Rhode Island training base during World War II

Motor Torpedo Boat Squadrons Training Center
- Part of US Navy
- Melville, Rhode Island on Narragansett Bay.
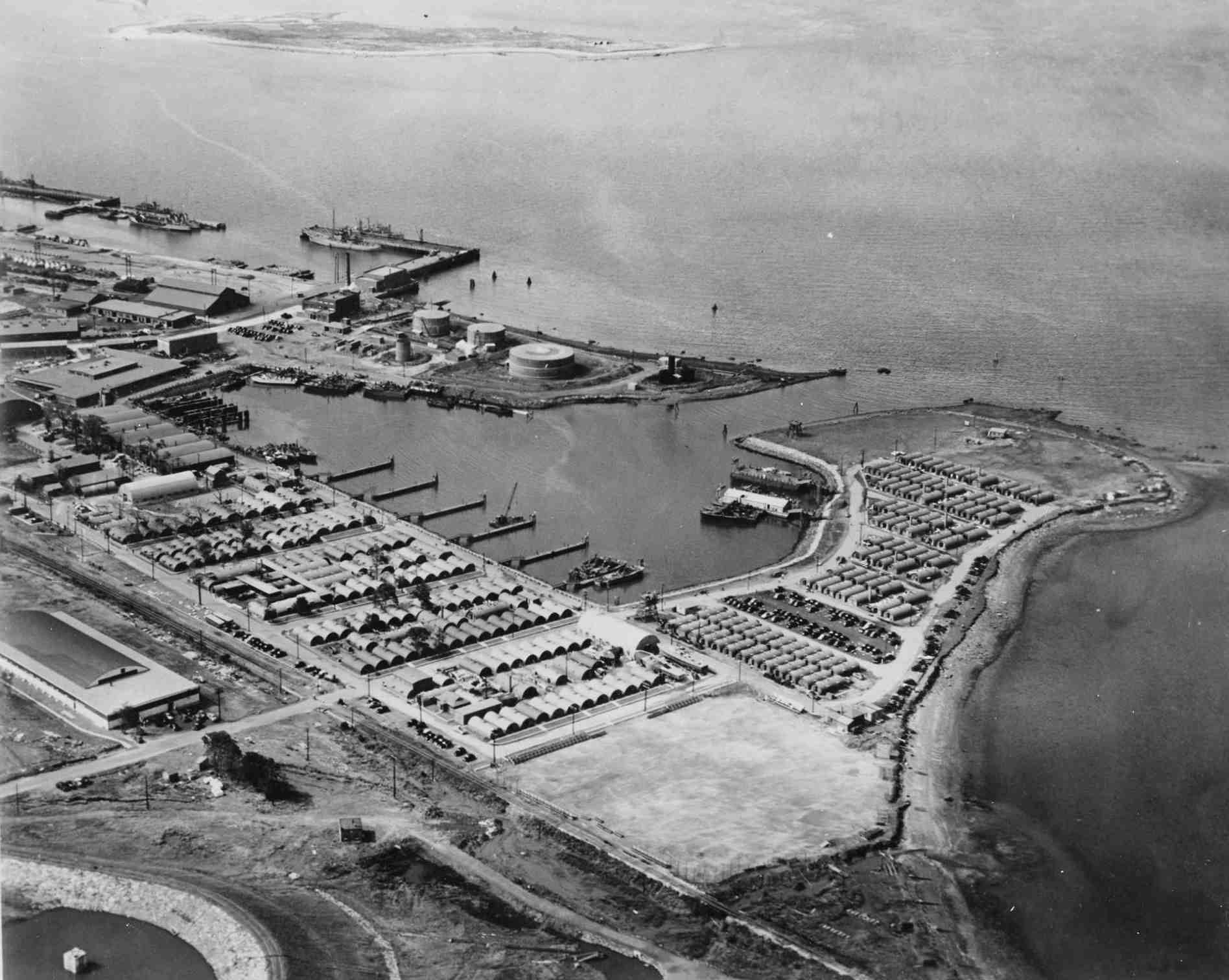
- MTB Training Center Melvill (MTBSTC) in 1943

Site information
- Type: Military training base
- Owner: United States
- Controlled by: United States Navy

Location
- Coordinates: 41.590639°N 71.282972°W

Site history
- Built: 1942
- Built by: US Navy
- In use: 1942-1945
- Fate: Closed November 1945
- Demolished: 1947
- Events: PT Boat Training for World War II

Melville Motor Torpedo Boat Squadrons Training Center in 1942

Melville Motor Torpedo Boat Squadrons Training Center (MTBSTC) was a PT boat Motor Torpedo Boat Squadrons Training Center found on February 17, 1942, by the United States Navy for World War II. The MTB Training Center Melville was at Melville, Rhode Island on Narragansett Bay. MTB Training Center Melville nickname was Spect Tech after its first commander, Lieutenant commander William C. Specht.

== History ==
MTB Training Center Melville training started in March 1942 with 51 officers and 177 enlisted men. This first Training was with ten PT boats of MTB Squadron Four using Elco Naval Division built 77-footers boat: PT-59 to PT-68. The men lived and worked in quonset huts. MTB Training Center Melville had buildings for 34 classrooms, PT maintenance, and 197 huts for living quarters. At is peak it had 90 officers and 860 sailors in a three-month training time spans. By March 1945 the MTB Training Center Melville trained 1,797 officers and 11,668 enlisted men, with 28 PT boats. The 28 PT boats included: Elco 80-foot boats, Higgins 78-foot boat, Huckins 78-foot boats, and 70-foot Higgins Hellcat boats. A the MTB Training Center Melville men practiced PT Boat formation and maneuvers; PT repairs and live fire gunnery. The Japanese called PT boat Devil Boats, the Navy called them the Mosquito Fleet, after their logo. At the MTB Training Center Melville, was the Motor Torpedo Boat Repair Training Unit (MTBRTU). Motor Torpedo Boat Repair Training Unit was staffed by 30 officers and 950 enlisted men. Motor Torpedo Boat Repair Training Unit trained men on repair of the three 1,500-horsepower Packard 4M-2500 engines built by Packard. MTB Training Center Melville also had a Naval Fuel Depot with high-octane fuel for the boats. Also by the Training Base was a Naval Net Layer Depot. Near by on Goat Island was the Newport Torpedo Station, which supplied the PT-Boats and submarines. The Navy, by this end of the war had 44 PT boat squadrons, generally comprising 12 boats. All told, the Navy commissioned over 650 PT boats by the end of the war. Gunnery training at the Anti-Aircraft Center took place a Price's Neck on Newport's Ocean Drive. After the war most PT boats were scrapped due to the lack of need and the vast fuel use of the three engines, thus the base was closed under the command of Naval Station Newport in November 1945. The site was Lovell Hospital during the Civil War and in the 1890s it was the Bradford Coaling Station. The Torpedo Station closed in 1951. Today part of the base is the Melville Marina and Safe Harbor New England Boatworks and fuel depot.

== Notable events ==
- In 1943, a PT boat launched a torpedo that went off course and sank a freighter anchored off the Quonset Point Naval Air Station.
- PT-200 hit a submerged object and sank, while patrolling Rhode Island coastal waters.
- In 1942, PT-59 launched a torpedo in error, it traveled seven miles and hit the cargo ship USS Capella at Jamestown, Rhode Island she was repaired and returned to service. Capella was beached to stop her from sinking.

== Sports ==
During the 1944 college football season, the Melville PT Boats football team scored victories over Boston College, Harvard, and Holy Cross. The following season, the team lost to Army 55–13.

== Motor Torpedo Boat Squadron 4 ==
Motor Torpedo Boat Squadron 4 (MTBRon-4), was the Motor Torpedo Boat Squadron (group) assigned to run the training center at Melville Motor Torpedo Boat Squadrons Training Center. MTBRon-4 operated with the most PT boats to support the training. MTBRon-4 was commissioned 13 January 1942 and decommissioned 15 April 1946. The PT Boats assigned to MTBRon-4 durning the war were: PT- 59–68, 71, 72, 95–102, 139–141, 199, 200, 295, 296, 314–317, 450–452, 486, 487, 505, 545, 557–559, 564, 613, 616, 619, and 620. After the war in April 1946 MTBRon-4 consisted of PT 613, 616, 619, and 620 these PT boats were transferred to the US Navy's Operational Development Force.

  - MTBRon-4 were Squadron Commanders:
- Lt. Rollin E. Westholm—January 13 to February 2, 1942
- Lt. Comdr. Alan R. Montgomery—February 2 to May 25, 1942
- Lt. Comdr. William C. Specht—May 25, 1942 to February 20, 1943
- Lt. Comdr. S. Stephen Daunis—February 20 to September 11, 1943
- Lt. Comdr. Francis D. Tappaan, USNR—September 11, 1943 to March 1, 1944
- Lt. Charles E. Tilden, USNR—March 1 to July 15, 1944
- Comdr. James B. Denny—July 15 to September 27, 1944
- Lt. Arthur H. Berndtson—September 27 to October 31, 1944
- Lt. Comdr. Jack E. Gibson—October 31, 1944 to June 15, 1945
- Lt. Comdr. Glenn R. Van Ness, USNR—June 15 to September 17, 1945
- Lt. Comdr. John K. Williams, USNR—September 17, 1945 to April 15, 1946

== Gallery ==
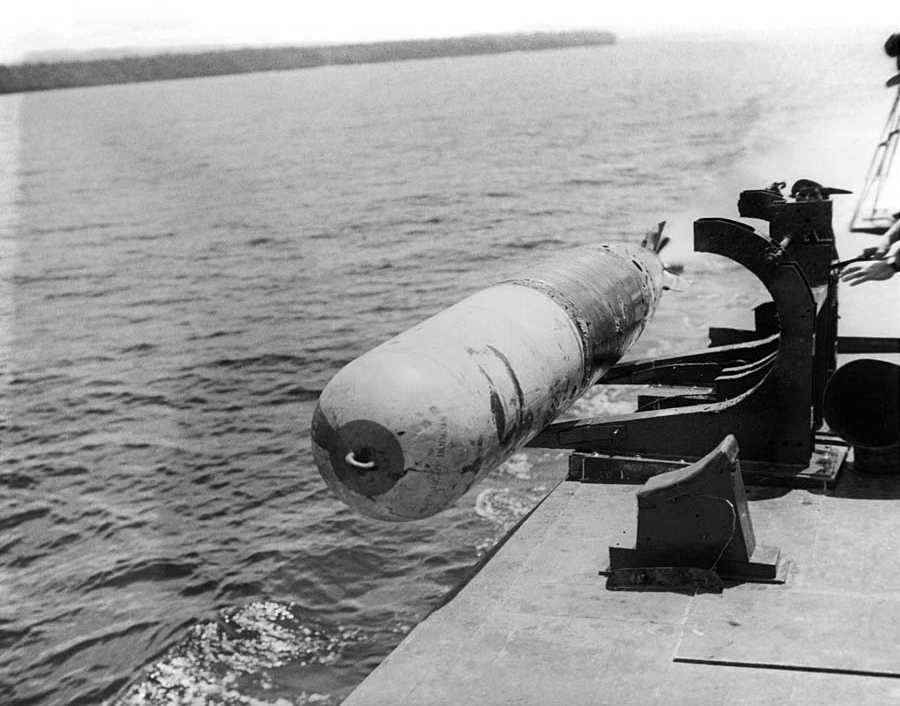
Mk 13 torpedo launch from PT boat in 1943

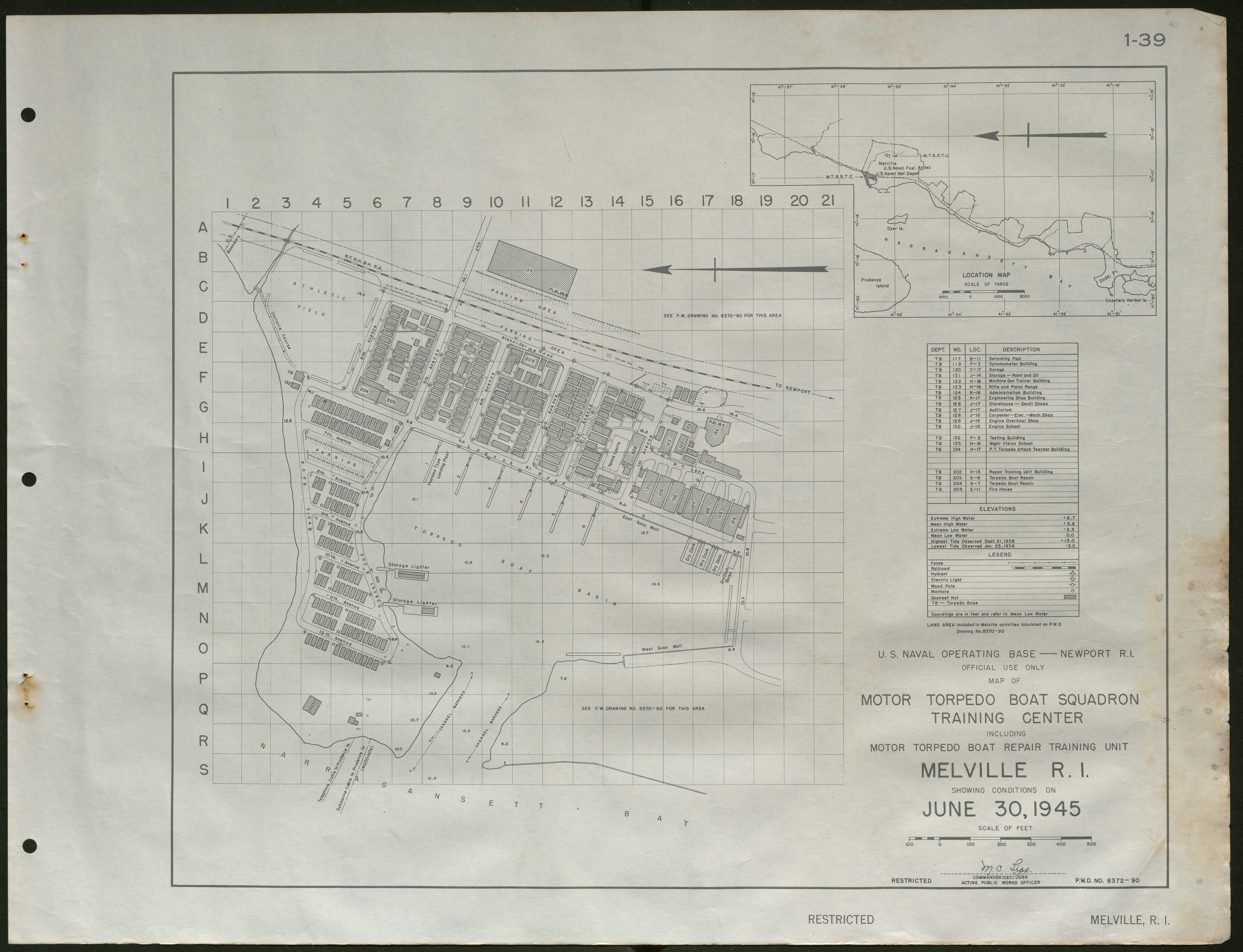
Map of MTBSTC, US Navy June 30, 1945

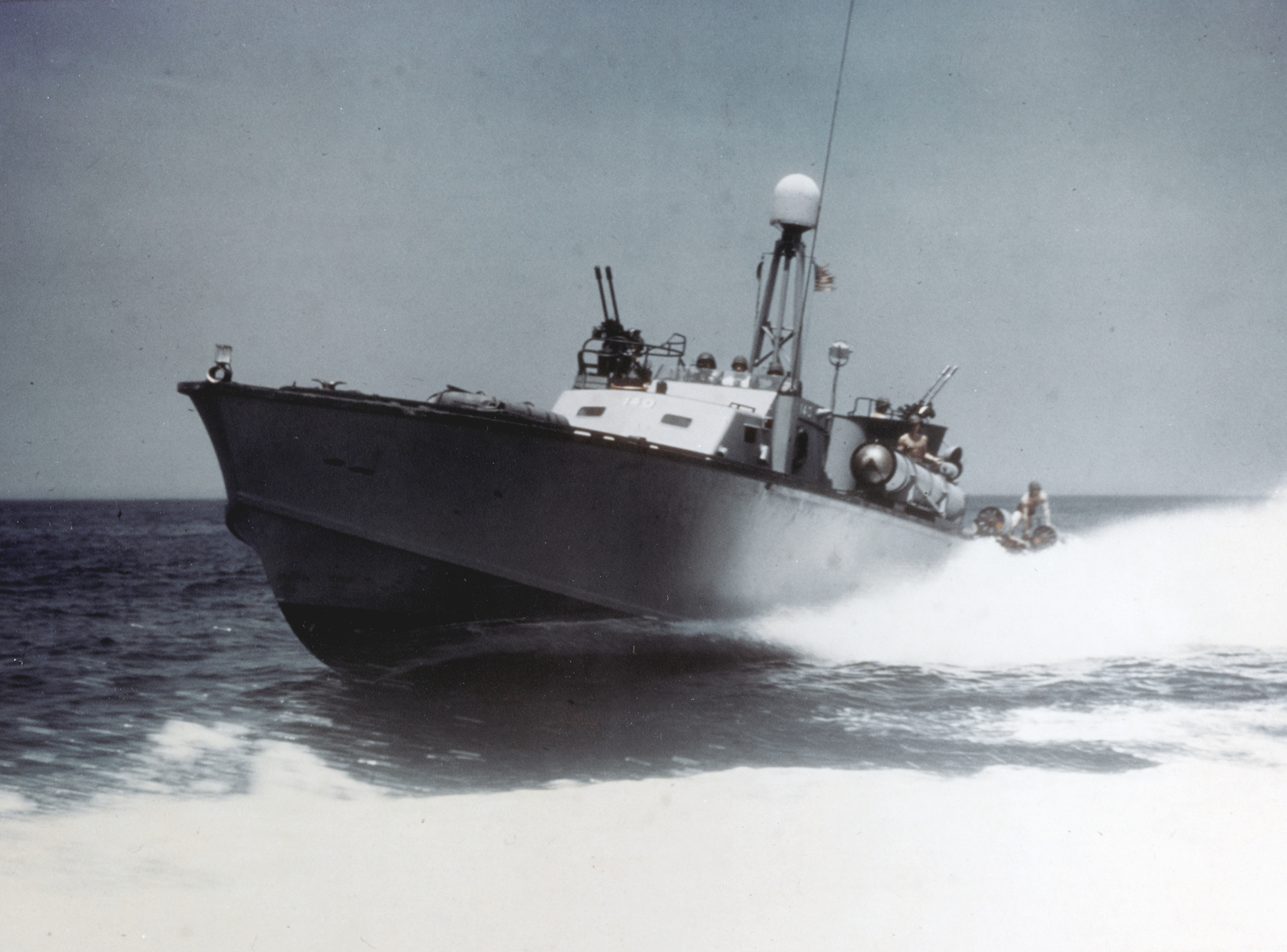
PT-140 underway off Melville in 1943

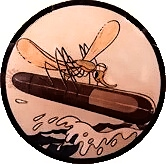
PT Boat Seal

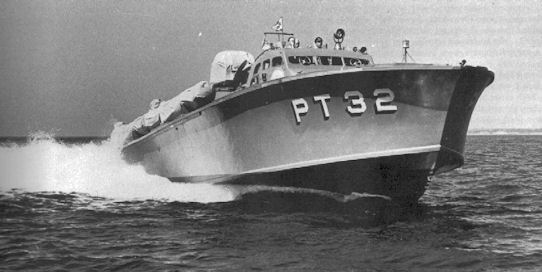
PT-32

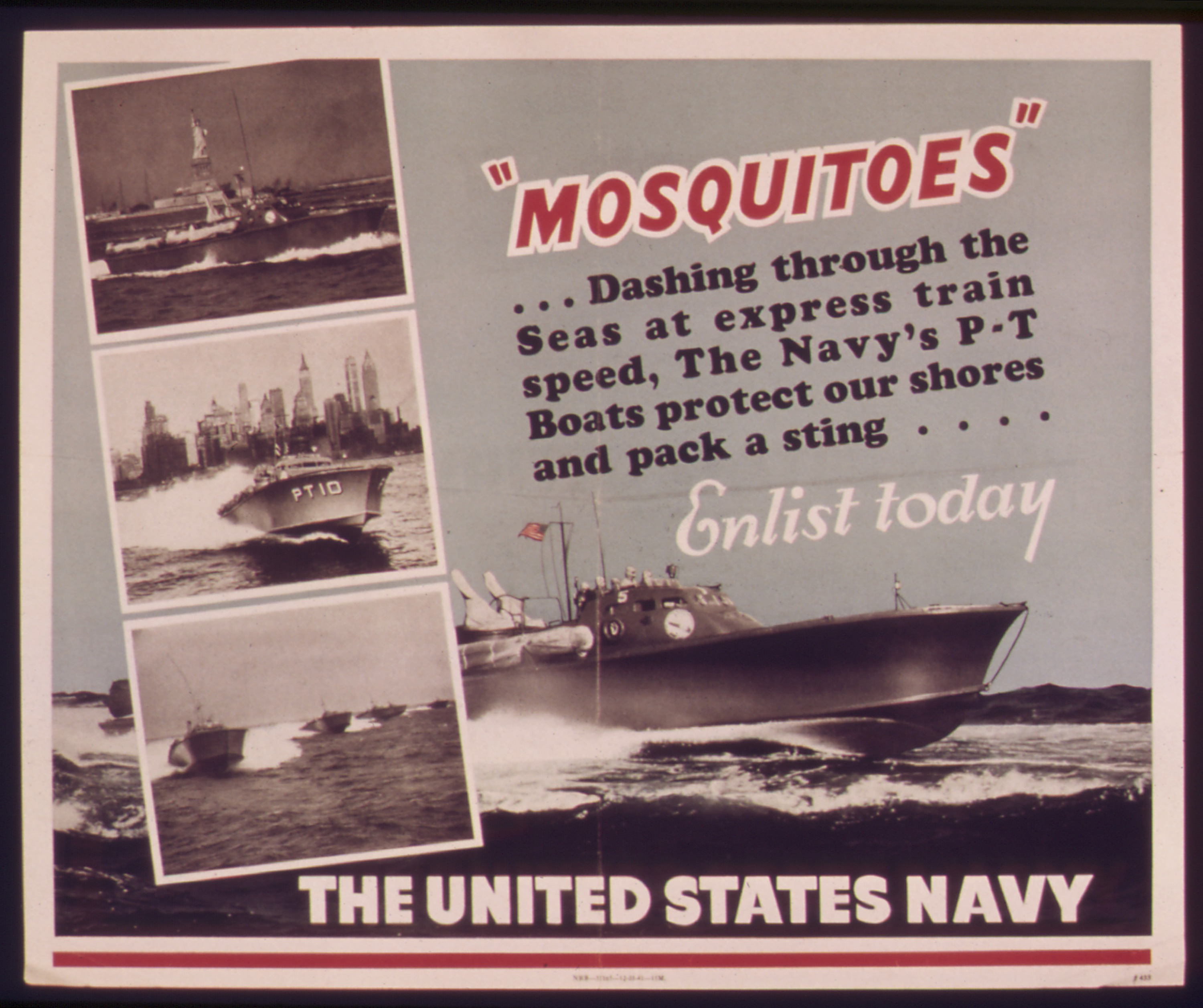
Mosquitoes, dashing through the seas at express train speed

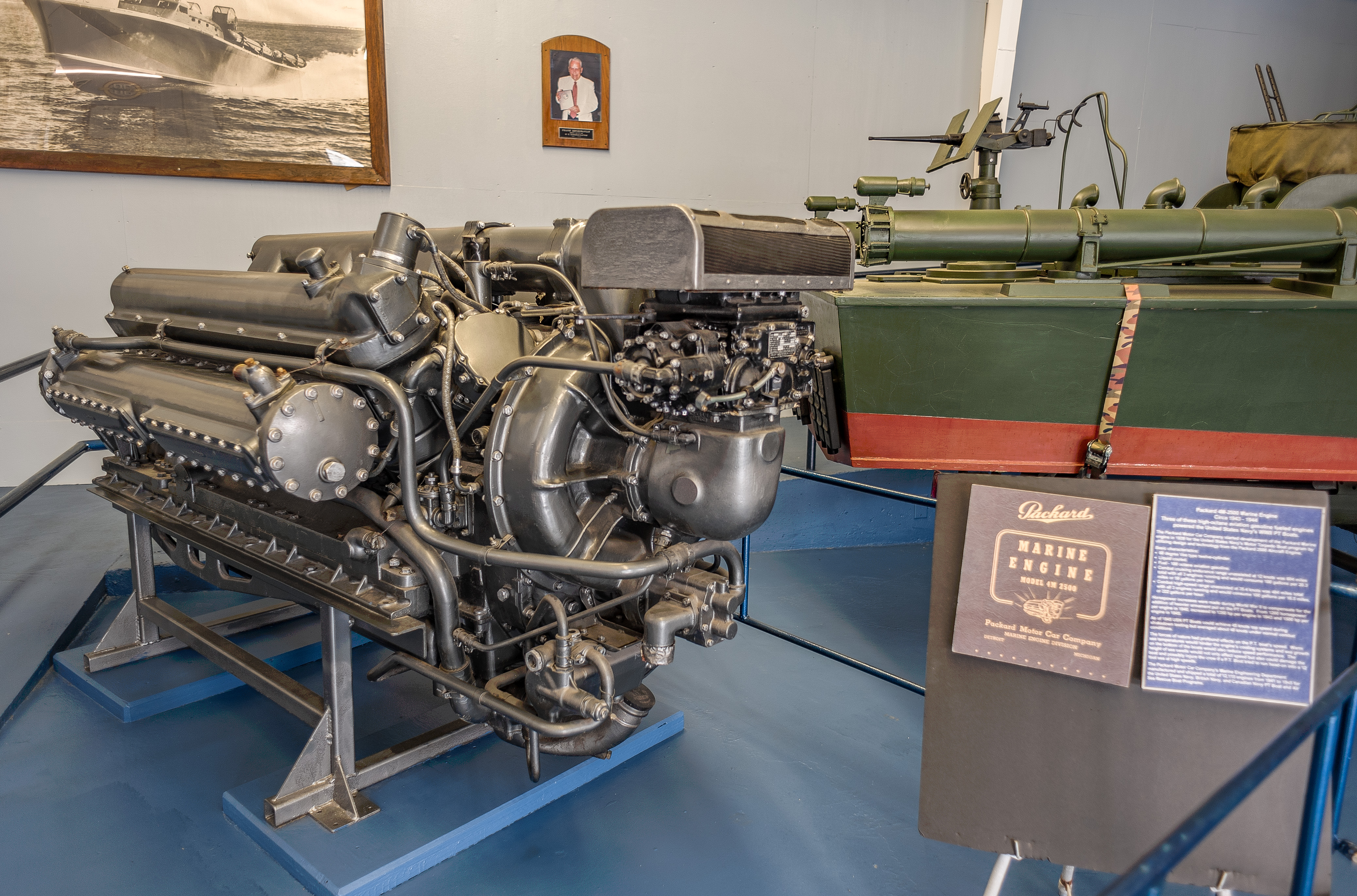
Packard Marine Engine M4 2500 at Battleship Cove in Fall River, Massachusetts

== See also ==
- PT Boat Museum
