= Jack Watt =

Jack Watt may refer to:

- Jack Watt (footballer, born 1890) (1890–1964), Australian rules footballer for Geelong, Melbourne and St Kilda
- Jack Watt (footballer, born 1907) (1907–1997), Australian rules footballer for Footscray
- Jack Watt (actor)

== See also ==
- Jack Watts (disambiguation)
- John Watt (disambiguation)
