= John Watts =

John Watts may refer to:

== Politics ==
- John Watts (1715–1789), member of the New York General Assembly
- John Watts (New York politician) (1749–1836), U.S. representative from New York
  - Statue of John Watts, an 1893 outdoor bronze sculpture
- John Watts (Australian politician) (1821–1902), Queensland politician
- John Watts (British politician) (1947–2016), British MP from Slough
- John Watts (Stoke politician) (1864–1951), British political activist and mine rescue hero
- John Watts (Grenadian politician) (1921/22-2015), Grenada MP
- John C. Watts (1902–1971), U.S. representative from Kentucky
- John Sebrie Watts (1816–1876), U.S. House delegate from New Mexico Territory

== Sports ==
- John Watts (athlete) (born 1939), British Olympic athlete
- John Watts (jockey) (1860–1902), British jockey
- Johnny Watts (English footballer) (1931–2006), English football player for Birmingham City F.C.
- Johnny Watts (Australian footballer) (1883–1952), Australian rules footballer
- John K. Watts (1937–2017), Australian sportsman and broadcaster
- John Watts (judoka) (born 1944), British judoka

== Military ==
- John Watts (military architect) (1786–1873), British military officer and colonial architect in New South Wales
- John Watts (British Army officer) (1930–2003), British general

== Others ==
- John Watts (merchant) (died 1616), English merchant and shipowner
- John Watts (Royal Navy officer) (1755–1801), midshipman on James Cook's third voyage to the Pacific
- John Watts (Cherokee chief) (died 1802), also known as "Young Tassel"
- John Watts (sailor) (c. 1778–1823), U.S. merchant captain from Virginia
- John Watts (reformer) (1818–1887), English educational and social reformer
- John Watts (composer) (1929–1982), American composer
- John Watts (singer) (born 1954), British singer/guitarist and member of Fischer-Z
- John Watts (historian), late medieval historian
- John D. W. Watts, Baptist theologian and Old Testament scholar
- John W.H. Watts, curator and architect

== See also ==
- Jon Watts (born 1981), American filmmaker
- Jack Watts (disambiguation)
- John Watt (disambiguation)
- John Watts de Peyster (1821–1907), author on the art of war, philanthropist; early Adjutant General of the New York National Guard
- John Watts de Peyster Jr. (1841–1873), Union Army officer during the American Civil War
