= John Watt =

John Watt may refer to:

- John Watt (politician) (1826–1897), Australian politician, member of the New South Wales Legislative Council
- John Watt (physicist) (born 1932), Australian physicist
- John Watt (cricketer) (1858–1914), Australian cricketer
- John Alexander Watt (1868–1958), Australian geologist and mineralogist
- John Charles Watt (1884–1961), Australian cricketer and son of the above cricketer
- John Watt (broadcaster) (1901–1960), British broadcaster and producer
- John Millar Watt (1895–1975), British painter, illustrator and comics artist
- John Mitchell Watt (1892-1980) South African pharmacologist and author

== See also ==
- John Watts (disambiguation)
- Jack Watt (disambiguation)
