= Patrol torpedo boat PT-59 =

Torpedo boat of the United States Navy

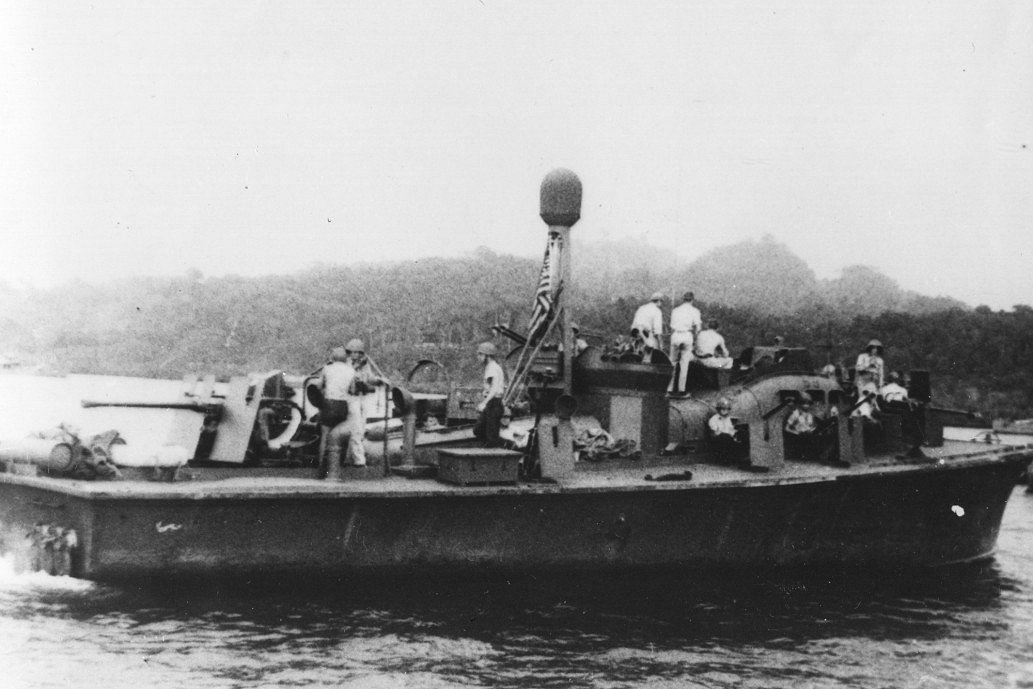
- PT-59 after conversion into a gunboat, October 1943

History

United States
- Name: PT-59
- Builder: Electric Launch Company, Bayonne, New Jersey
- Laid down: 26 July 1941
- Launched: 8 October 1941
- Completed: 5 March 1942
- Fate: Sold, 1947, Sunk, 1976, remains raised and on display at Battleship Cove

General characteristics
- Class & type: Elco 77-foot PT boat
- Displacement: 40 long tons (41 t)
- Length: 77 ft (23 m)
- Beam: 19 ft 11 in (6.07 m)
- Draft: 4 ft 6 in (1.37 m)
- Propulsion: 3 × 1,500 shp (1,119 kW) Packard V12 M2500 gasoline engines, 3 shafts
- Speed: 41 knots (76 km/h; 47 mph)
- Complement: 15 as built, 18–20 as PT gunboat
- Armament: As built: 4 × 18 in (457 mm) Mark 8 torpedoes; 2 × twin .50 cal. M2 Browning machine guns in Dewandre turrets; 2 × .303 cal. Lewis guns; 2 × depth charges; As PT gunboat: 6 × .50 cal. machine guns, three on each side; 2 × 40 mm guns (fore and aft) suitable as anti-aircraft guns; 2 × twin .50 cal. machine guns in elevated circular Dewandre turrets, behind and on each side of the cockpit Also suitable as anti-aircraft; 2 × single .30 cal. machine guns, forward of the cockpit, on each quarter
- Armor: Gunboat on gunwales, gas tanks

Service record
- Commanders: Lt. David M. Levy (5/1942–9/1943); Lt. John F. Kennedy (9/1943–11/1943)

PT-59 / PTGB-1 was an S-Class Patrol Torpedo boat (PT boat) of the United States Navy, built by the Electric Launch Company of Bayonne, New Jersey. The boat was laid down as Motor Boat Submarine Chaser PTC-27, and was reclassified as BPT-11 when assigned to transfer to Britain under Lend-Lease. However, this was cancelled, and she was reclassified as PT-59 prior to launch on 8 October 1941, and was completed on 5 March 1942.

After serving in a training squadron in Rhode Island, PT-59 was reassigned to Motor Torpedo Boat Squadron Two for the protection of the Panama Canal before being transported by oceangoing ship to the Solomon Islands in the South Pacific. It arrived at its home base of Tulagi and served successfully, sinking a Japanese submarine by torpedo.

In the fall of 1943, PT-59 was converted into a gunboat under the direction of its new commander, Lieutenant (and future U.S. President) John F. Kennedy when the chronic inaccuracy of the era's torpedoes and under-arming of the resulting craft were both recognized. She had all four of her torpedo tubes removed, as well as her two depth charges. The refit added two 40-millimeter Bofors cannon fitted fore and aft with shields added to the mounts. Also added were six .50-caliber machine gun nests, with three on each side, behind shields, as well as additional weaponry.

The partially armored craft was then notably used to rescue marines stranded under heavy Japanese gunfire on Choiseul Island, and attack both Japanese barges and shore batteries.

== Service history ==
=== 1941 to 1943 ===
PT-59 was first assigned to Motor Torpedo Boat Squadron Four, the training squadron based at Melville Motor Torpedo Boat Squadrons Training Center. On 9 April 1942, one of its torpedoes was accidentally fired, hitting the supply ship USS Capella and causing eight injuries, but no deaths.

It was transferred to Motor Torpedo Boat Squadron Two on 7 May 1942. At the end of May 1942, Ensign David M. Levy took over PT-59 and the squadron was sent on anti-submarine duty to Panama to guard the Panama Canal and the Central and South American coast. In October 1942 PT-59 departed for the South Pacific on board the Liberty ship SS Roger Williams. In November 1942 PT-59 arrived at the Solomon Islands with MTB Squadron 2, numbering 8 boats. The squadron was based at Sesapi on Tulagi Island.

On the night of 9 December, Lt. (j.g.) John M. Searles USNR, in the 59, patrolling with PT-44 at Kamimbo Bay, sighted an enemy barge. As the PT-boats opened fire on the barge, Searles saw a surfaced submarine. He quickly fired two torpedoes, one of which struck it amidships. A geyser of water spouted high in the air, followed by tremendous explosions and a huge oil slick that spread for an hour and a half. It was confirmed that Searles had sunk the submarine I-3, a vessel 320 feet (97.5 m) long, of 1,955 tons standard surface displacement.

In March 1943 PT-59 was sent forward to the Russell Islands. In the fall of 1943, David M. Levy returned to the United States and was succeeded as commanding officer by Lt. (j.g.) John F. Kennedy.

=== Under Kennedy's command ===
In September 1943, Kennedy took command of PT-59. Though he had earned the right by Navy custom to be returned to the States, he chose to stay and fight in the Pacific Theater (PTO) after his second command, PT-109, was rammed and sunk by the Amagiri on the early morning of 2 August 1943. At 74 feet, the PT-59 was six feet shorter than the PT-109, but it would soon bristle with far more and heavier guns and armament, which required a larger crew to operate.

=== Crew of PT-59 gunboat ===
- John F. Kennedy, Lieutenant, Commanding Officer (Boston, Massachusetts).
- Robert Lee "Dusty" Rhoads, Lieutenant JG, Executive Officer, helped test armor of PT gunboat
- I.J. Mitchell, Ensign, Gunnery Officer, former skipper of PT-21 that had been lost running aground on a coral reef
- Glen Christiansen, Chief Gunner's Mate, formerly sunk at Pearl Harbor
- John E. Maguire, Radioman 2/c (RM2), previously sunk on PT-109, (Dobbs Ferry, New York).
- Edman Edgar Mauer, Quartermaster 3/c (QM3), previously sunk on PT-109, (St. Louis, Missouri).
- Edmund Drewich, had crewed on the 109, but not on the night it was lost
- John Klee, Gunner's Mate, who crewed on the 59 in November, and was likely present at the rescue at Choiseul
- Maurice Kowal, had crewed on the 109, but not on the night it was lost. He was later appointed to a National Park Service job by Kennedy as President.
- Leon Drawdy, had crewed on the 109, but not on the night it was lost
- Five additional crew were assigned by Lieutenant Alvin Cluster, from the lost and scrapped PT-21

==== Conversion to a gunboat ====
On Tulagi Island, under Kennedy's supervision and with his help, PT-59 had all four of her torpedo tubes removed, as well as her two depth charges, and was converted into a more powerful gunboat, and re-designated as PTGB-1. She received two heavy 40-millimeter Bofors cannon anti-aircraft guns now fitted fore and aft. The refit also added six .50-caliber machine gun nests, with three on each side, behind shields. Shielded twin fifty caliber machine guns were placed behind and on each side of the cockpit elevated on circular mounts, and by some accounts, 2 additional thirty caliber machine guns forward of the cockpit in the front of the boat on each side. The higher caliber guns were added to increase range and power and to make the 59 more effective against both Japanese barge traffic, which had powerful guns, and heavy caliber Japanese land and shore based garrisons. Admiral William Halsey and other high ranking naval officers had concluded that the torpedo tubes and Bliss–Leavitt Mark 8 torpedoes assigned the old PTs, were highly unreliable and inaccurate; the torpedoes very rarely hit their mark against larger craft, particularly Japanese destroyers and cruisers. The new PT gunboat was given slightly higher quality radar, and a taller radar mast that could, in theory, boost reception and transmission to 75 miles (121 km). Kennedy lived on the boat during its refit, and worked extremely hard according to Lieutenant Alvin Cluster, who stated, "I never saw a guy work harder, longer hours". Kennedy's gunboat, sometimes referred to as PT-0001 was the first completed, and it carefully followed the design and planning of both Kennedy and squadron commander Cluster. Another PT gunboat was given to Lenny Thom, who helped in the refit, and later commanded. Thom had been Kennedy's former executive officer on PT-109.

PT-59's cramped engine room

Both sides of PT-59's highly flammable 3000 gallon gas tanks, housed below decks and immediately behind the cockpit, and the gunwales were reinforced with armor plate to protect them from return fire. Kennedy was aware that the PT's wooden hulls without armor plating could not withstand even a single bullet or bomb fragment, and that the tiniest shard of hot metal could ignite the gas tanks, instantly destroying the boat and killing the crew. The 59's crew set up some of the armor for live fire tests and found they could be breached at short range by .30 and .50-caliber machine guns at a frontal angle. On 7 October 1943, the five-week redesign of PT-59 was completed, and on the following day Kennedy was promoted to full lieutenant.

Kennedy's new executive officer was Lt. (j.g.) Robert Lee "Dusty" Rhoads. Rhoads later stated he was impressed that so many men (five) from PT-109 followed Kennedy to his new command. Kennedy's loss of the 109 was not viewed as a shortcoming by his crew, many of whom had been on other craft that had sunk or been run aground. Two other gunboats were also converted. The plan was to attach one new gunboat to each PT boat section to add firepower and range, though the extra armor and guns reduced their speed.

=== Operation Blissful ===
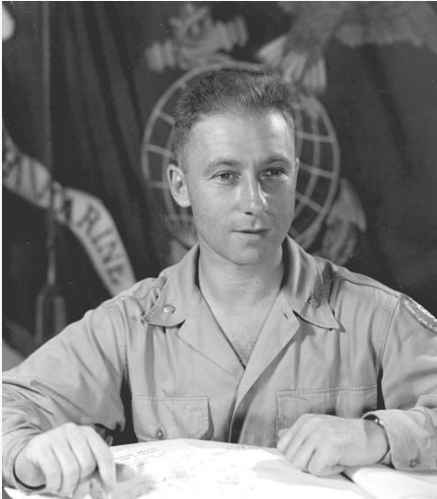
Lt. Col. Krulak, Operation Blissful

On 18 October 1943, as American Marine paratroopers first landed on Choiseul Island as a diversionary tactic, PT-59 and crew were ordered to move northwest from their base on Tulagi, to Lambu Lambu Cove, on Vella Lavella Island, a new advanced PT boat base. Over the next month, PT-59 took part in thirteen patrols, initially expected to discourage Japanese barge traffic in the north of Choiseul Island. Kennedy described his month on patrol as "packed with a great deal in the way of death". Constantly tracked by aircraft, Kennedy's refitted PT-59 evaded bombs dropped by Japanese floatplanes on 26 October, though one bomb landed only 150 yards (140 m) away.

Operation Blissful was a diversionary raid on Choiseul Island by Marine forces led by Lt. Col. Victor H. Krulak, on 28 October. It was hoped that the raid would convince the Japanese that they needed to send more troops to Choiseul from Bougainville—the Allies' real objective because of its airfields.

=== Rescuing trapped marines near Warrior River ===
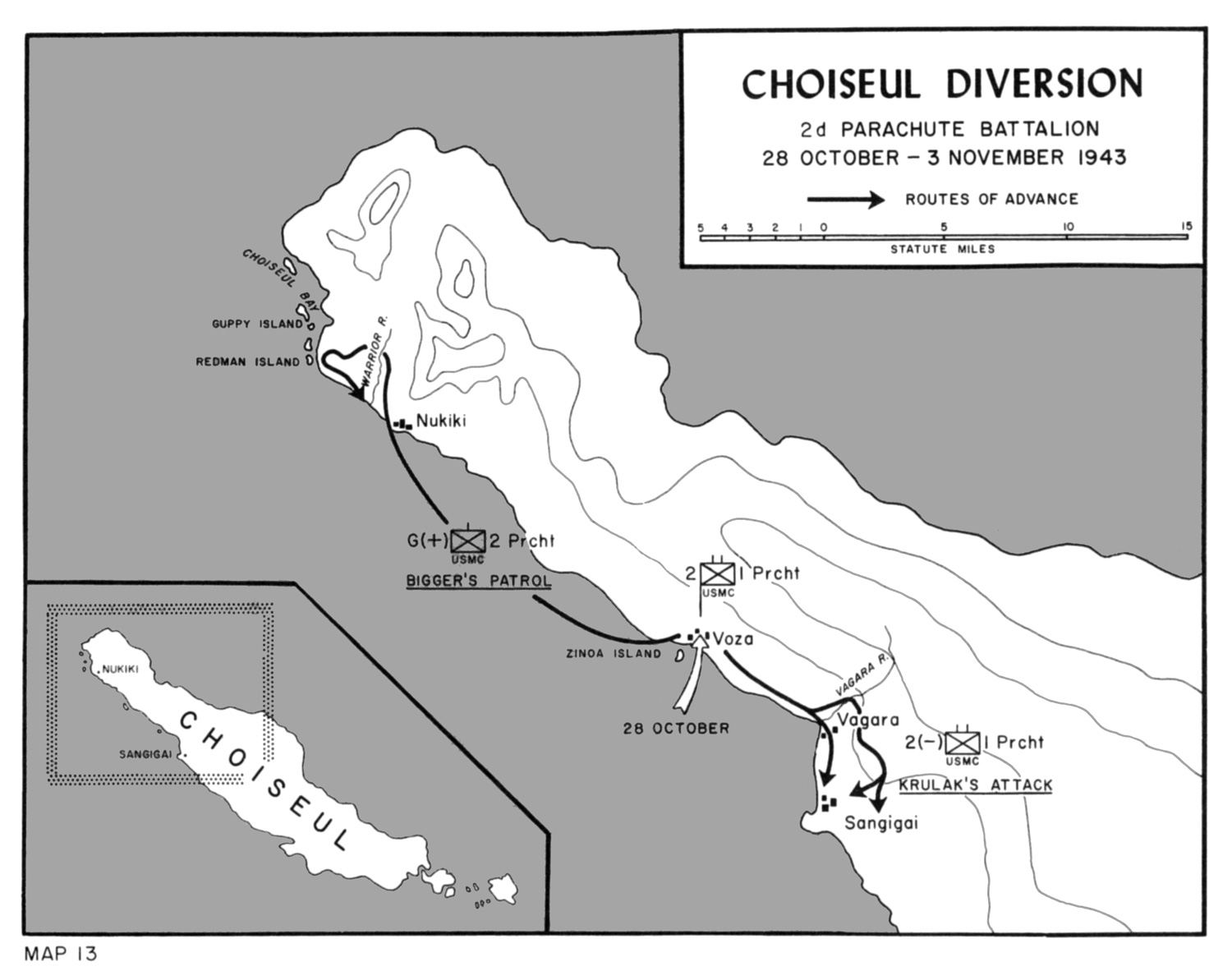
Map of Choiseul raid and rescue, Warrior River in the North near Redman Island, Voza southeast, and Krulak's attack at bottom

On the evening of 1 November 1943, Kennedy was asked by Lt. Arthur Berndsten, the temporary base commander at Lambu Lambu, on the northeast side of Vella Lavella Island, if he would take PT-59 to support a rescue operation around 65 miles (105 km) north near the base of Choiseul Island's Warrior River. Berndsten had been contacted by Krulak, the leader of Operation Blissful, who had requested rescue for marines trapped near the base of Choiseul's Warrior River. (Berndsten had formerly skippered PT-171 when it helped in the rescue of Kennedy and his 109 crew the previous August.)

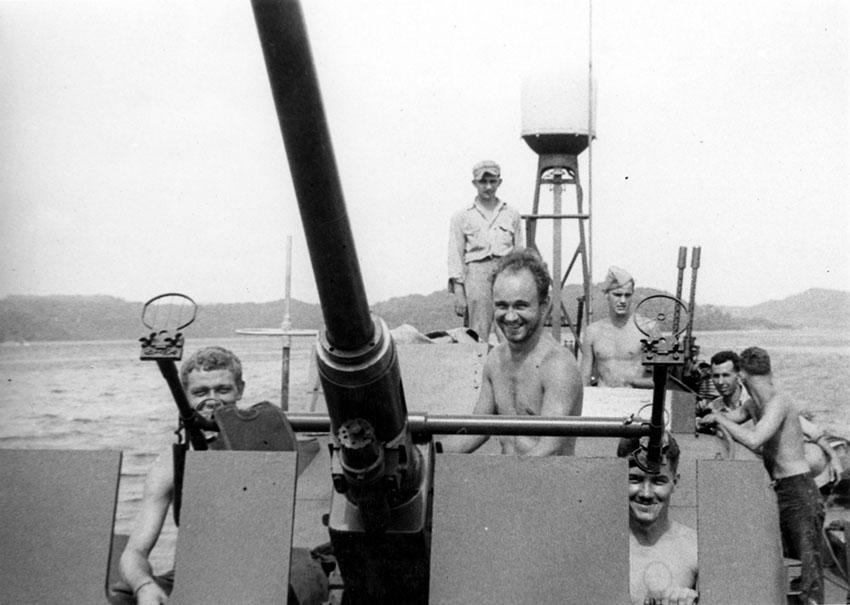
PT-59 (front view) was low on gas at the Choiseul rescue, in view are a Bofors 40 mm gun and twin .50 Brownings

Choiseul Island became a very new Allied target, as the Navy and Marines pushed farther northwest into territories in the Solomons formerly held by the Japanese. With time of the essence, Kennedy was not able to fully re-fuel his boat. Berndsten knew Kennedy did not have enough fuel to make the trip there and back with his gas tanks less than a third full, around seven hundred gallons, so he sent two additional PT's to accompany him and provide support if necessary. Completing their Northbound route to Choiseul, PT-59 first arrived near the shore of the Marine outpost at Voza Village and picked up Kennedy's friend from Rendova, Lieutenant Richard Keresey, and Lt. Col. Krulak, who acted as guides. The officers were picked up from a landing craft near the shore. Motoring around 25 miles (40 km) further northwest, and following Choiseul's coastline, the 59 arrived in the rain and darkness at the base of the Warrior River around 6:00 p.m. on 1 November, and helped personnel landing craft evacuate 40 to 50 marines from a company led by Marine Major Warren T. Bigger.

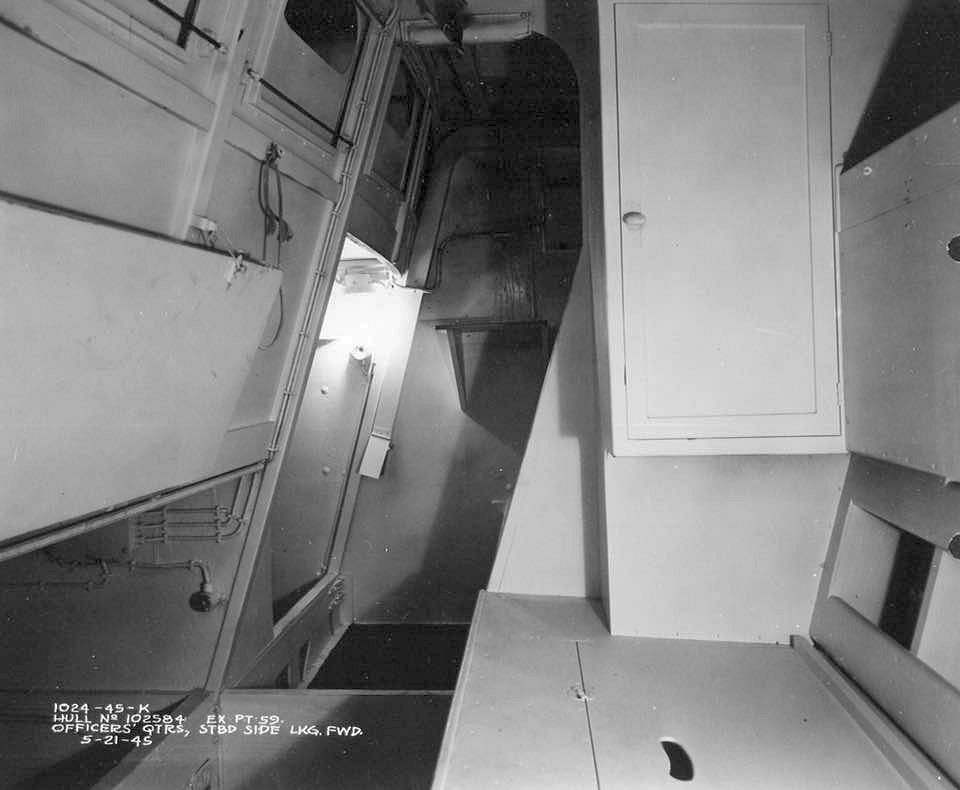
PT-59 Officer's Quarters where Corporal Schnell and Kennedy bunked in 1943

Several marines were wounded, and came from the 2nd Parachute Battalion of the 1st Marine Parachute Regiment that had been lost in the jungle and trapped by Japanese shore fire during the recent raid on Choiseul Island, still in progress. The trapped marines originally numbered around 87, and had faced as many as 900 Japanese during the height of the fighting. Kennedy was reluctant to have his gunners fire on the shoreline, afraid of hitting any of the marines waiting to evacuate. The 59 acted as a shield, positioning itself between the Japanese shore battery and both the escaping marines in the water and one landing craft bearing marines, 250 yards (230 m) from shore, that had been damaged after running aground on the coral reef. PT-59 took aboard ten marines near the crippled craft and fed them canned peaches, the first meal they had had in days. Three marines were wounded, including Corporal Schnell who died in Kennedy's bunk that night, attended by his Marine doctor, whom Kennedy had also picked up.

One of PT-59's large 40 mm

Kennedy's PT may have slowly departed, as she carried the extra weight of ten marines. Several of the unwounded marines held on to gun mounts to steady themselves as the 59 departed. The two PT's, including Kennedy's, then escorted the slow-moving landing craft they had shielded from fire back to Voza, and when it was clear they would safely reach their destination, they left the landing craft and returned to their base at Lambu Lambu.

With their speed and maneuverability, the mission demonstrated the PTs' suitability for search and rescue operations, their greatest strength throughout the war. Around 3:00 a.m. on 2 November, PT-59 ran out of gas about halfway back to Lambu Lambu and had to be towed by PT-236. Both PT's were vulnerable to Japanese airstrikes during the slow towing process, and Kennedy called for air support. To Kennedy's dismay, all of the 4-6 Australian P-40's that responded were eventually shot down.

On the evening of 3 November, PT-59 and four other craft traveled around 45 miles (72 km) from Lambu Lambu back to the Marine base at Voza Village and screened and escorted several landing craft that carried additional marines back to Vella Lavella Island. The 59 and several other PT's arrived in darkness at Voza around 11:30 p.m. and interspersed themselves around the landing craft waiting to pick up the marines. The Japanese were stationed near the shore, and began setting off booby traps. By around 1:50 a.m., the marines began boarding the landing craft, having been ordered to withdraw by Lt. Col. Krulak, who was concerned the Japanese might begin to mortar his troops. When the marines had fully boarded the landing crafts, the 59 and other PT's escorted them around 45 miles (72 km) back to Vella Lavella island.

Operation Blissfull's diversionary raid on Choiseul was, for the most part, a success. The Japanese did send reinforcements to Choiseul, weakening their reaction to the Allied Bougainville landing. The Choiseul operation destroyed several hundred tons of enemy fuel and supplies, sank two barges, and destroyed the barge station at Sangigai, Choiseul, disrupting Japanese barge traffic along the coast of Choiseul.

==== Attacks on barges and shore batteries ====
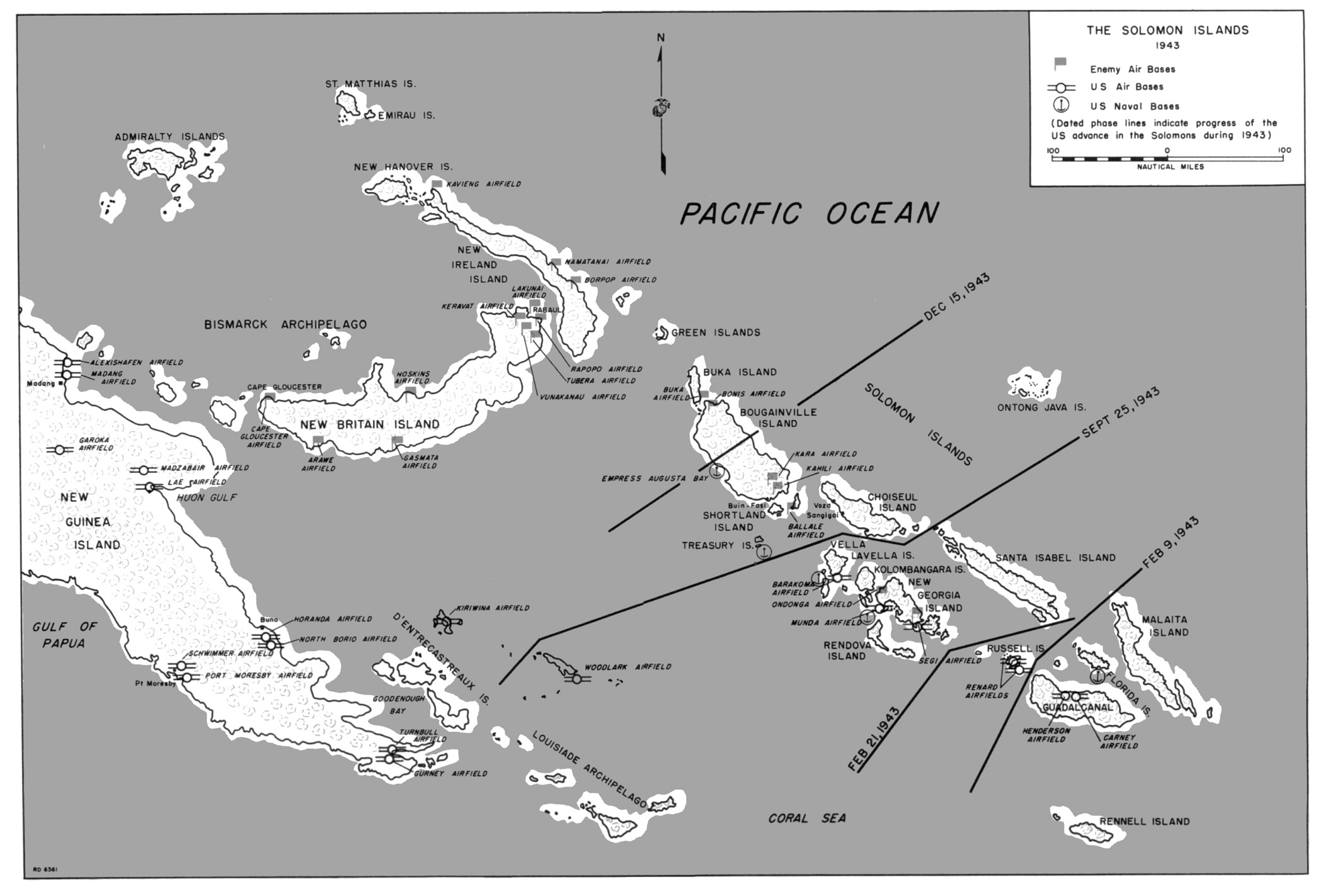
Choiseul, Vella Lavella Islands near 9/25/1943 line

At 5:30 a.m on 5 November, PT-59, accompanied by two other PT's, destroyed three Japanese barges they found beached on Moli Island on the Northeast coast of Choiseul Island, near the base of the Warrior River. Though the barges were believed to be unmanned, they would likely never return to duty. Attacking manned barges required the superior use of firepower, and then a quick retreat, and were usually brief, but important actions as barges could ferry both troops and supplies.

On the night of 11 November, the 59's gunners fired at two Japanese armored barges emerging from the Warrior River on Choiseul, but they quickly fled. Barge traffic in the vicinity had begun to diminish slightly by this period in the Solomon campaign, as thousands of exhausted Japanese troops on Choiseul began to hope for evacuation northwest to Bouganville Island.

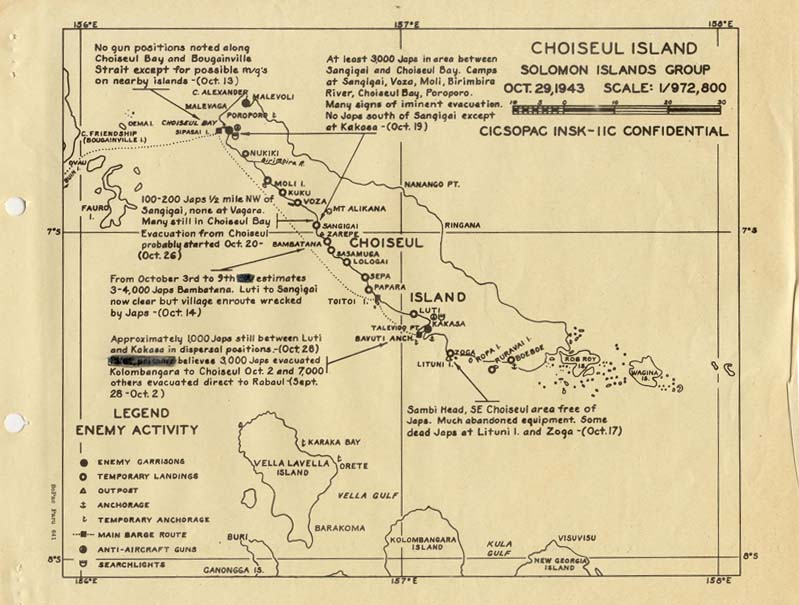
Japanese troop strength on Choiseul. Note Vella Lavella Island below, Voza near center, above the word Choiseul, and Moli I. above Voza

On 13 November, PT-59 had success shelling Sipassa and Guppy Island at the mouth of Choiseul Bay, only 2–3 miles northwest of the Warrior River, shown in map at right. According to Christiansen, the 59 then saw the flash of a muzzle farther back on the high bluffs of the Warrior River on northern Choiseul Island during return fire, and pinpointed heavy automatic fire at the flash, likely knocking out the shore battery. Flushed with his successes, Kennedy, developed a plan for a daylight raid up the Choiseul's Warrior River, shown in the raid on Choiseul map, above. The concept of a daylight raid was rejected by both his Chief Petty Officer, Christiansen, and his senior squadron commander, Lieutenant Alvin Cluster, who considered the plan risky to the extreme. Though the Warrior River acted as a base of operations for many of their barges, it was fortified by large numbers of Japanese shore batteries, and would have been a deadly mission in daylight. As evidenced by his plan for a daylight raid, many of the 59's crew were concerned that Kennedy volunteered for the riskiest missions and constantly sought out danger, but they were usually willing participants.

Cluster gave Kennedy a perfect 4.0 for his leadership as PT-59's commanding officer, writing that Kennedy "demonstrated a cool effectiveness under fire and exhibited good judgement and determination in entirely strange conditions." With Kennedy suffering from a host of ailments, Cluster relieved him of command on 18 November, after a routine patrol off Redman Island in Choiseul Bay. Kennedy had lost twenty pounds in the three previous months and had put back little of the weight, weighing only around 145 pounds at six feet of height. In Lambu Lambu's hospital, Dr. Wharton, concerned about Jack's worsening back problems and continued weight loss, diagnosed "chronic disk disease" and colitis, and passed the news to Cluster who worked to get Kennedy back to the states. First sent to Tulagi for medical care and diagnosis, Kennedy was sent home to the States on 23 December 1943, aboard the USS Breton, and arrived in San Francisco on 7 January. He obtained a Navy desk job at the Submarine Chaser Training Center in Miami in March, was transferred to the Chelsea Naval Hospital near Boston by May, and, after months of recuperation, was finally given an honorable discharge in December 1944. After working as a journalist, he would begin his run for the House of Representatives in 1946, using his war time experience as a major feature of his candidacy.

=== After Kennedy's command ===
PT-59 remained in the Solomons until August 1944, when she and five other 77-ft Elco PT boats, including PT-36 and PT-47 were transported back to the Motor Torpedo Boat Squadrons Training Center at Melville, Rhode Island. It is safe to assume repairs were performed on the boat by the MTB Base Repair Training Unit. PT-59 was redesignated as a "Small Boat" and renumbered C102583 on 14 October 1944, and along with ex-PT-47, used briefly as a crash rescue boat at NAS Norfolk, before being transferred to the Philadelphia Navy Yard on 15 December 1944 to serve as a test subject for dehydration tests. Surveyed on 21 March 1947, she was then stricken and sold.

== Fate ==
PT-59, converted to a fishing boat, decaying in Harlem River

PT-59 quietly ended her days in the 1970s after having served as a fishing boat in Manhattan. Because PT-59 was thought to be the former PT-95, a 78-foot Huckins PT boat of very different design, no efforts were made to save or salvage her. The actual PT-95 had been scrapped in Newport, Rhode Island, after her services were no longer needed, in September 1945. When the actual identity of the fishing boat was discovered, James "Boat" Newberry, founder of PT Boats Inc., attempted to obtain her; however, her ownership was tangled up in NYC probate court. After an unexpected fire, the boat sank at its moorings, beside the 207th St. Bridge over the Harlem River, around 1976. The hull sat for years at the bottom of the river and slowly rotted away.

In May 2017, Kennedy biographer William Doyle announced preliminary explorations in the Harlem River near 208th Street indicated a strong possibility that PT-59 could be found and recovered. He was looking to raise funds from Kennedy focused organizations to fully explore the area. In June 2020 the Metropolitan Transportation Authority announced that parts of the boat had been recovered during preparations to construct a seawall.

== Legacy ==
Byron "Whizzer" White served as deputy attorney general under Kennedy, who later appointed White as an associate justice to the Supreme Court in the early 1960s. White had acted as the intelligence officer for Commander Thomas Warfield, Kennedy's commanding officer while he served in Rendova, and had investigated the sinking of the PT-109. He joined Kennedy on several patrols of PT-59, while Kennedy captained the boat from Lambu Lambu. Kennedy appointed Paul Burgess ("Red") Fay Jr., skipper of PT-167, as Under Secretary of the Navy. Several of the crew of PT-109 rode on a patrol boat float at his inauguration. In 1948, as a member of the House of Representatives, Kennedy came out strongly in favor of retaining the Marines as a separate division of the armed services.

== Awards ==
- American Campaign Medal
- Asiatic-Pacific Campaign Medal with three battle stars
- World War II Victory Medal
