= SS Comerant =

Two ships built by American International Shipbuilding in were named Comerant at launch. They are disambiguated by month of delivery:

- SS Comerant (March 1920)
- SS Comerant (April 1920)
