= USS Platte (AO-24) =

Oiler of the United States Navy

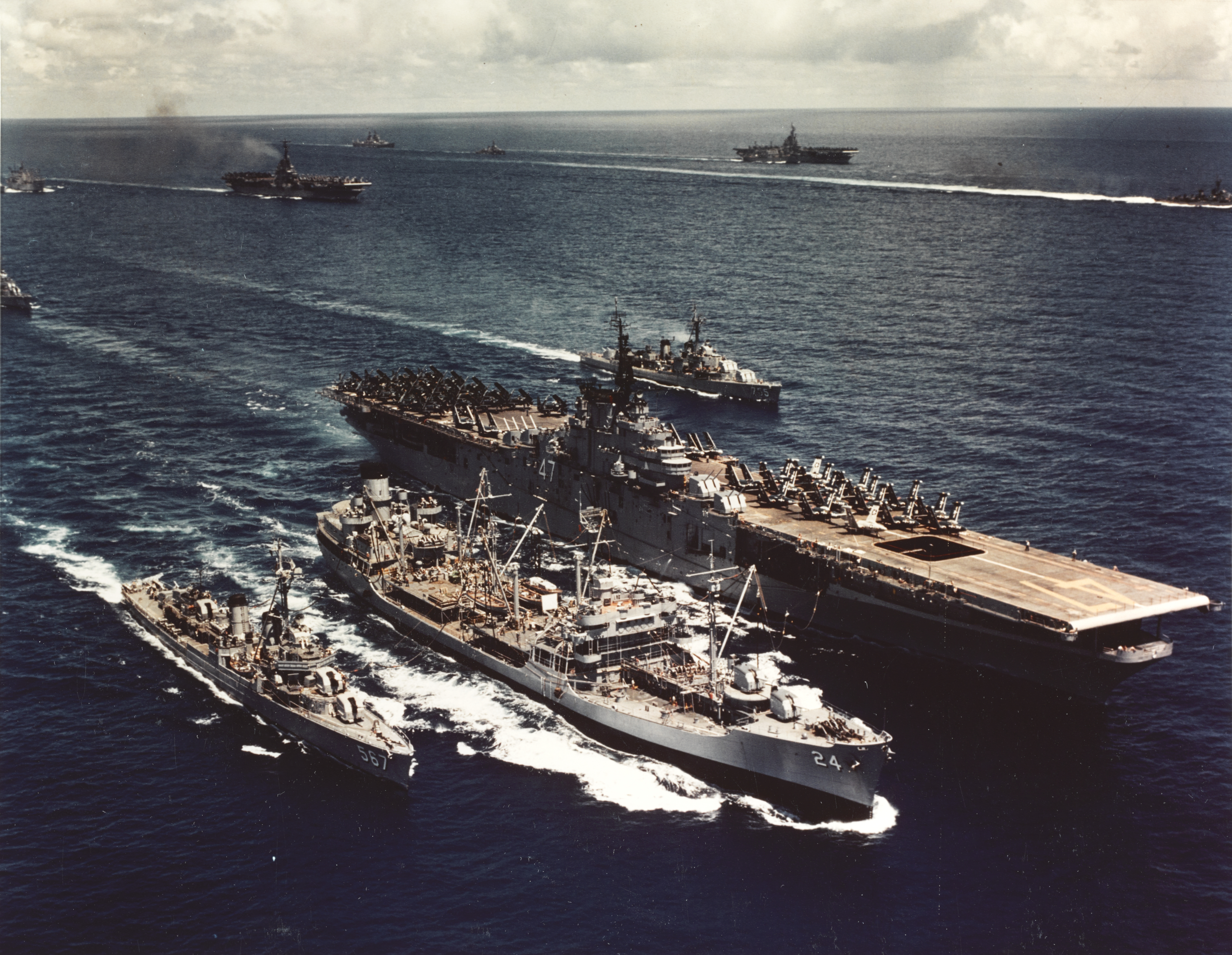
- Platte refueling Philippine Sea and Watts, 19 July 1955

History

United States
- Name: USS Platte
- Namesake: Platte Purchase
- Builder: Bethlehem Steel Company, Baltimore, Maryland
- Launched: 8 July 1939
- Sponsored by: Mrs. Harold R. Stark
- Commissioned: 1 December 1939
- Fate: Sold for scrapping, 14 May 1971

General characteristics
- Class & type: Cimarron-class oiler
- Displacement: 7,470 long tons (7,590 t) light; 24,830 long tons (25,228 t) full load
- Length: 553 ft (169 m)
- Beam: 75 ft (23 m)
- Draft: 32 ft 4 in (9.86 m)
- Propulsion: Twin screws, 30,400 shp (22,669 kW); Steam, 600 psi (4,100 kPa), NSFO
- Speed: 18 knots (21 mph; 33 km/h)
- Complement: 304
- Armament: 4 × 5 in (130 mm)/38 cal. guns (4×1); 4 × 40 mm AA guns; 4 × 20 mm AA guns

Service record
- Operations: World War II, Korean War, Vietnam War
- Awards: 11 battle stars (World War II); 6 battle stars (Korea); 8 campaign stars (Vietnam)

USS Platte (AO-24) was a Cimarron-class oiler serving with the United States Navy, named for the 1836 Platte Purchase that included the Platte Rivers in Iowa, Missouri and Nebraska. Her memorial in Platte County, Missouri honors all four rivers that share the name recorded by Lewis and Clark in 1803.

== Construction and commissioning ==
Platte was built by the Bethlehem Steel Company, Baltimore, Maryland; launched 8 July 1939; sponsored by Mrs. Harold R. Stark; and commissioned at Norfolk, Virginia 1 December 1939.

== Service history ==
After fitting out in the Philadelphia Navy Yard Platte departed Norfolk 27 March 1940, making two voyages to the oil docks of Houston, Texas, then supported the fleet operating from the Panama Canal Zone. During the next forty-five days she replenished fleet tugs USS Capella and USS Navajo who towed the huge floating drydock YFD–2 to Pearl Harbor, Hawaii. Platte reached her new base of San Pedro, California 4 September. For the next fourteen months she carried liquid cargo, passengers and freight to Pearl Harbor. Her last voyage to Hawaii prior to outbreak of war terminated at San Diego, California 26 November 1941 and she was in that port when the Japanese struck Pearl Harbor.

=== World War II ===
On 17 December, Platte put to sea with a convoy for Pearl Harbor and was underway on 11 January 1942 in company with the aircraft carrier USS Enterprise (CV-6), flagship of Admiral William F. Halsey, Jr., commander of Task Force 8. She provided underway replenishment services for this carrier task force as it guarded troop and cargo ships reinforcing the Samoan Islands.

Platte spent the next months refueling task forces on offensive patrol in the Coral Sea. She fueled the Australian squadron along with the Lexington carrier task force and the Yorktown (CV-5) carrier task force prior to the carrier strikes on Salamaua and Lae, New Guinea. She then stood out to sea with Enterprise on 28 May as all fleet units prepared to turn back the expected Japanese attack on Midway Island, fueling the Enterprise task force and the Yorktown task force just before the Battle of Midway.

Platte then began her support of Solomon Islands operations. She was in the ocean approaches to the Solomons on the morning of 10 August, delivering fuel to the Enterprise carrier task group, then the Saratoga carrier group two days later. Platte returned to Noumea on 14 August to replenish her tanks, then subsequently fueled Saratoga Wasp, and Enterprise carrier task groups. After a return to the West Coast, she operated in support of fleet units engaged in the Guadalcanal Campaign.

Platte departed San Pedro on 9 April 1943 to provide logistic support for the Aleutian Islands Campaign, serving as station tanker in Kulak Bay, Adak. After several runs between the West Coast and Pearl Harbor, Platte served with twelve other fleet oilers of Service Squadron 8 as part of a task group refueling warships involved in the Gilbert and Marshall Islands campaign.

Platte was underway for the Marshall Islands the afternoon of 31 January 1944, fueling the battleship USS Pennsylvania and six destroyers, before standing out to sea on 11 February. On 6 June, Platte cleared Majuro Atoll with Fast Carrier Task Forces for the Marianas Islands, and on 14 June fueled the Yorktown (CV-10) carrier task group while in sight of Tinian Island. She completed her last fueling and third replenishment cruise for logistic support of the Marianas Operation on 14 August.

Platte loaded fuel and cargo at Eniwetok, then made passage to Seeadler Harbor, Manus, Admiralty Islands. This harbor was her base of logistic operations in support of the occupation of certain Palau Islands; Ulithi, in the Caroline Islands; and Leyte and Samar in the Philippines. She cleared that base on 4 September and was off Palau to fuel numerous ships. Platte was underway from Manus on 20 October with five other oilers and escorts to support the liberation of the Philippines.

After overhaul in the United States, Platte provided logistic support to combat ships in the forward area to the northeast of the Marianas Islands where she fueled carriers, cruisers, battleships and destroyers engaged in the Battle of Iwo Jima and the carrier strikes on Tokyo.

Platte stood out to sea on 13 March to commence support of Fast Carrier Task Forces in the conquest of Okinawa. She terminated her support of the Battle of Okinawa upon her arrival at Ulithi on 14 June and departed that port 3 July as part of the logistic support force of Fast Carrier Task Force 38 for the strikes against Honshū, Japan. On 15 August word was received that President Harry S. Truman had announced the agreement of Japan to surrender. Platte entered Tokyo Bay on 10 September to act as station tanker in that port until 29 September when she got underway for return to the United States.

=== Post-War ===
She arrived at Yokohama, Japan, to support the occupation forces 4 February 1946. During the next twelve months she constantly shuttled from the oil docks of Bahrain and Saudi Arabia, to support fleet operations at principal ports of Japan, Korea, and the Philippine Islands. In the following months she gave logistic support to the fleet at ports of Japan; Buckner Bay, Okinawa; and Tsingtao, China. Fleet tactics off the coast of Southern California and upkeep in the Long Beach Naval Shipyard and Mare Island Navy Yards were followed by another cruise to the Far East.

=== Korea ===
On 22 February 1951 Platte left the Hawaiian Islands astern and set her course by way of the Marshall Islands and Okinawa for Sasebo, Japan. She reached the last named port 2 April and was off Songjin, Korea, 4 April to deliver fuel to the cruiser USS Saint Paul and five destroyers of the United Nations Escort and Blockade Force on the east coast of Korea. This was the first of an endless chain of logistic support runs from Sasebo to the coast of Korea where she also gave vital fuel and aviation gasoline to the fast attack carriers Boxer, Philippine Sea, and Bon Homme Richard. Platte entered the harbor of Keelung, Formosa, 17 May to serve as station tanker for the ships on Formosa Patrol. She resumed replenishment of the fleet off Korea from Sasebo 30 June.

Platte commenced a second tour of service in support of the warships on Formosa Patrol and those operating in combat areas off the coast of Korea 3 January 1952. She reached Sasebo 3 May 1953 for a third tour of duty in support of the United Nations Forces in Korea. She continued operations in the East China Sea and off Inchon after the truce agreement and put to sea from Yokosuka 24 October for return to Long Beach, California 10 November.

Platte stood out of San Diego Harbor 17 March 1954 and touched at Yokosuka on her way to Subic Bay in the Philippine Islands, thence to Formosa and Hong Kong before arrival at Sasebo. She returned to Long Beach 2 October and had completed six similar tours in support of US 7th Fleet operations in the Far East by 28 June 1960. A unit of Service Squadron 3 on each of these tours in the Far East, her operations in support of the 7th Fleet carried her to every principal port of Japan, the Philippines, Okinawa, Formosa and Korea. Her operations on the West Coast which intervened this service were under Service Squadron 1.

=== Vietnam ===
Platte made almost yearly deployments to the western Pacific Ocean from 1960 to 1968, including extensive operations in Vietnamese waters and refueling the Enterprise (CVN-65) task group off Korea during the Pueblo incident as part of Operation Formation Star. Platte served with the Pacific Fleet into 1970. She was sold for scrapping on 14 May 1971.

== Awards ==
- Navy Meritorious Unit Commendation
- China Service Medal
- American Defense Service Medal with "A" device
- American Campaign Medal
- Asiatic-Pacific Campaign Medal with 11 battle stars
- World War II Victory Medal
- Navy Occupation Service Medal (with "ASIA" clasp)
- National Defense Service Medal (two awards)
- Korean Service Medal with six battle stars
- Armed Forces Expeditionary Medal (two awards)
- Vietnam Service Medal with seven service stars
- Republic of Vietnam Gallantry Cross (Republic of Vietnam)
- United Nations Service Medal (United Nations)
- Vietnam Campaign Medal (Republic of Vietnam)
- Korean War Service Medal (Republic of Korea)
