= Huckins Yacht Corporation =

Boat builder company in America

Huckins Yacht Corporation is one of the oldest boat builders in the United States. The company is located on the Ortega River in Jacksonville, Florida, and is run by its third-generation owners, Cindy and Buddy Purcell. Huckins manufactures custom yachts ranging from 40 to 90 feet that combine classic design and traditional workmanship with modern technology and amenities. It has built a total of 457 yachts during its 80 years of operation, crafting vessels one at a time.

Huckins Yacht Corporation hosts an annual rendezvous which provides an opportunity for Huckins owners to gather together and share their boating experiences.

== History ==
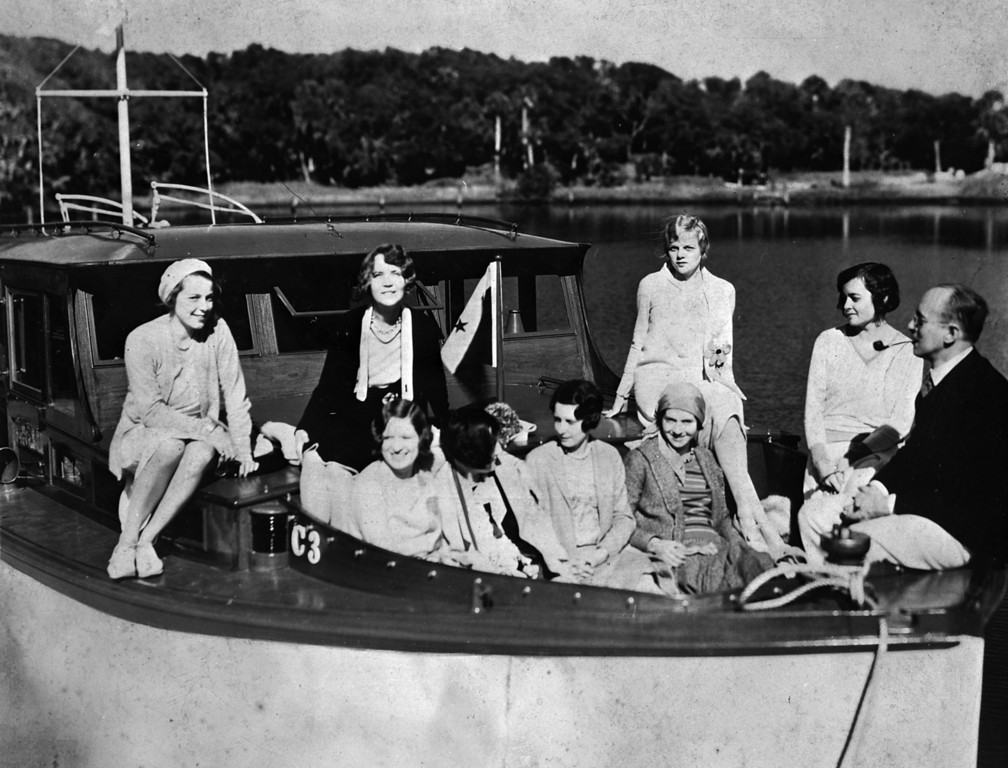
Maiden voyage of the Fairform Flyer. Frank Huckins, founder of Huckins Yacht Corporation, is seated on the right with a pipe.

Frank Pembroke Huckins came from a family that had been in the lumber business in Maine ever since his grandfather Pembroke Somerset Huckins, and his great-grandfather John Huckins, of Bangor, founded the P. S. Huckins Company in 1854.

The Boston concern dealt in ship timbers and planking during the years prior to the rise of iron- and then steel-hulled ships. After the Civil War, wooden shipbuilding waned and a new demand arose for factory timbers. The Huckins company adapted itself to the new field with a stock of suitable southern yellow pine timber and plank.

Frank Pembroke Huckins, the fourth generation scion, left Harvard College in his junior year and went to work in the "Marine Gasolene (sic) Engine Business". In December, 1908, he went to work for P.S. Huckins Company, where he became the tallyman and surveyor in the company's lumber yard. All of the yellow pine timber sold by the Huckins family business was shipped in schooners from Jacksonville and Fernandina to East Boston. Huckins was made assistant treasurer of the company in 1911, and president in 1912.

Huckins sold the P.S. Huckins Company in 1923 and moved to Jacksonville in 1924. In 1926 he became a partner in the Drayer–Warren Company, an architectural millwork firm supplying materials for the construction boom in Florida, and the name was changed to the Warren–Huckins Company. In 1928, Warren–Huckins was reincorporated as the Huckins Yacht Corporation by Huckins, Harold l. Perrin of Boston, and Henry Skinner Baldwin of Springfield. A slogan used by the former company, "Florida Fairform Finish", inspired the new firm's yacht brand name, "Fairform Flyer".

Huckins hired Florida boat builder Herschel B. Ward as foreman, and construction of the Fairform Flyer Hull No. 1 began in April, 1928. Around this time, his partner Ling Warren decided that he wanted out of the yacht building business, and Huckins bought him out. The Fairform Flyer 42' Express Cruiser was launched in July 1928, captained by Huckins himself on its maiden voyage from Fernandina, Florida to New York City. It was sold in the autumn for $15,000 to David M. Goodrich of the B.F. Goodrich Rubber Company, who became a repeat customer. A company booth at the 1929 New York Boat Show took six orders for yachts, and to expedite the work Huckins used modular construction.

The onset of the Great Depression motivated Huckins to build smaller boat designs and to seek more efficient construction methods for larger vessels, such as mounting engines on I-beams supported by the engine room bulkheads, and using belt driven V-drive propulsion systems.

In 1943 the U.S. Navy commissioned Huckins Yacht Corporation to build two squadrons of PT boats, a total of 18 boats for service during World War II.

John F. Kennedy was in command of a Huckins-built vessel, PT-101, when he served as an instructor at the Motor Torpedo Boat Squadrons Training Center in Melville, Rhode Island. He also delivered PT boats from Melville, Rhode Island, to Jacksonville and then to the breaking-in center in Miami.

In 1969, Huckins built the largest sportfishing yacht in the United States, measuring 80 feet in length.

In 1976, Huckins Yacht Corporation constructed the largest motor yacht in the United States, built with an Airex-cored fiberglass hull.

In 1986, Huckins built a specialty 78-foot sport cruising yacht, which included wide doors and an elevator, designed for an owner confined to a wheel chair.

The oldest existing boat built by Huckins Yacht Corporation, the 1931 Offshore 48' Avocette III, was honored in July 2008 by the Museum of Yachting.

Original boat designs are still available at Huckins Yacht Corporation as it continues to build fine custom yachts. The complete history of the company can be found in the book, Huckins: The Living Legacy, by Andreé Conrad and Anders Jonsson.

== PT boats ==
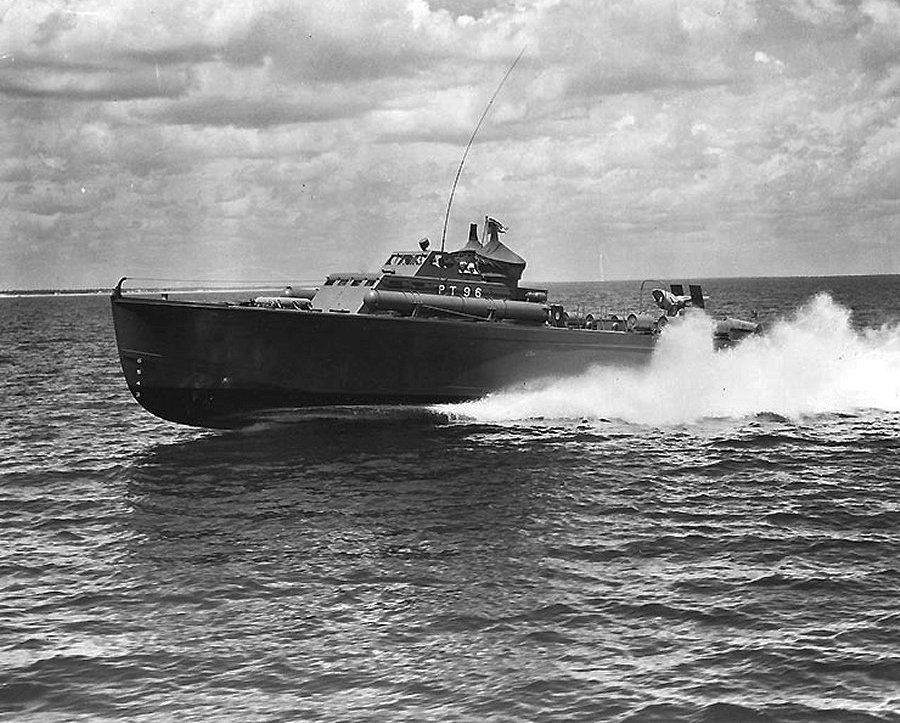
USS PT-96, built by Huckins at Jacksonville, Florida, underway at high speed, circa 1942

Huckins Yacht Corporation built PT boats for two squadrons during World War II. In 1940, three governing bodies – the Bureau of Ships, the Board of Inspection and Survey, and the Navy Personnel Command – had agreed that all PT boats developed up to that time were defective. Confident he had a solution, Frank Pembroke Huckins utilized his company's own "Quadraconic" Hull to build a boat that met the Navy's PT boat guidelines. The Quadraconic design, supported by 15 years of in-house research and experimentation, was developed using a conic method worked out by Lindsay Lord, and resulted in slightly concave bottom sections and a sharp bow entry. The Huckins PT 69 was compared to those being constructed by Elco, Higgins and the Philadelphia Navy Yard in a series of comparative performance tests conducted by the Board of Inspection and Survey off New London, Connecticut, in July 1941, known as the "Plywood Derby". The tests allowed boats of various classes from the three manufacturers to demonstrate their seakeeping qualities and hull strength by making a run at maximum sustained speed in the open ocean. Accelerometers were installed in the pilot house of each design to record "pounding" of the hull against the water in like sea conditions. The seaway course of the open-water trial, 190 nmi (350 km; 220 mi) at full throttle, started from the mouth of New London Harbor and finished at Montauk Point Whistling Buoy.

The Elco and Huckins boats made the best showing; although the Huckins edged the Elco 77-footer in speed (41.5 versus 40.2 knots), turning circle (305 yards in diameter compared to 407 yards) and pounding factor (the Elco pounded 60% more than the Huckins), Elco took first place, and was awarded a contract to build 385 boats.

Huckins won its design contract in 1941, just when the Navy was ready to scrap the PT program, and licensed the use of the Quadraconic hull in PT boat construction. They also granted permission for Elco, Higgins and the Philadelphia Navy Yard to use their patented laminated keel, which increased hull strength. A total of 18 78-foot (24 m) boats for squadrons 14 and 26 were commissioned in early 1943. They were assigned to specific outposts in the Panama Canal, Miami, Florida, the Hawaiian Sea Frontier at Pearl Harbor, in the Central Pacific, and a training center in Melville, Rhode Island.

The Huckins patrol torpedo boat platform was designed to handle four torpedoes, two 50-caliber gun turrets and depth charges on the stern. The Huckins boats were generally well-regarded by the sailors who crewed them. They had relatively high freeboard, with good headroom below the decks. A man could stand in the engine room, so engineers had plenty of space to work. Sleeping quarters on the Huckins PT vessels were considered to be comfortable by their captains and crews, who called them "the yachts".

=== Technical specifications ===
Lindsay Lord, a commander in the United States Navy who was stationed in Hawaii during the war, examines wartime PT boat design in his Naval Architecture of Planing Hulls and records the Navy's planing hull research and findings. This is the most complete source of information on PT boat hull design and construction, and provides hull test data as well as detailed analysis and comparisons of the various PT boat designs.

U.S. Navy technical specifications of the Huckins PT Boat (Patrol Torpedo) Motorized Torpedo Fast Boat:

- Crew: 11
- Length: 78 ft (24 m)
- Beam: 19.6 ft (6.0 m)
- Draught: 5 ft (1.5 m)
- Displacement: 42 tons
- Machinery: 3 Packard 12-cylinder gasoline engines delivering 1,350 horsepower each to 3 shafts.
- Surface Speed: 40 kn (46 mph)
- Range: 0 miles (0 km)
- Armament:
  - 4 x 21-inch (533mm) torpedo tubes for 4 x Mark 8/13 torpedoes, launchers arranged as inline pairs along port and starboard sides.
  - 1 x 37mm OR BOFORS 40mm Dual-Purpose cannon fitted on forecastle.
  - 1 x 20mm Oerlikon anti-aircraft cannon at stern
  - 4 x 0.50 caliber (12.7mm) anti-aircraft, air-cooled heavy machine guns in dual mounts (2x2), one emplacement amidships and one forward, offset to starboard
  - Optional 0.30 caliber machine guns, mortar launchers, rocket projectors and additional 20mm cannons (and captured 23mm anti-tank guns) as required/available.
- Ship class: PT 95
- Number-in-class: 18
- Ships-in-class: PT 95-102; PT 255-264
- Initial year of service: 1942
