= V-drive =

Gearbox and drive configuration for marine propulsion

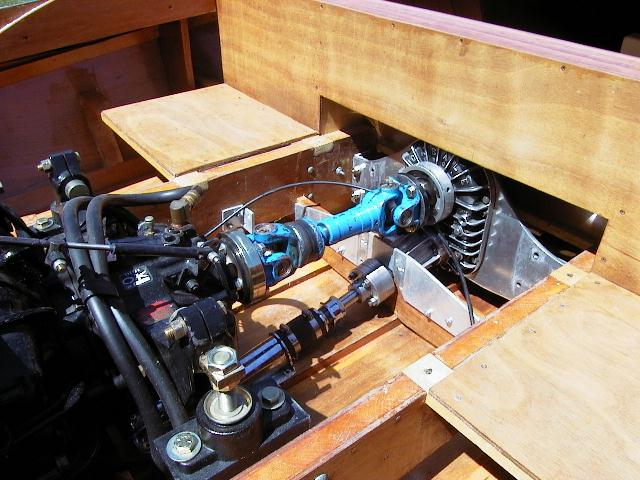
Conventional V-drive with two shafts

A V-drive is a marine power transmission system that consists (usually) of two gearboxes, two drive shafts, and a propeller as follows (in order): there is a standard gearbox, a primary shaft, a V-gearbox, a prop shaft, and a propeller.

Whereas the conventional arrangement sites the engine with its gearbox aft, driving the propeller shaft directly, in a "V-drive" layout, the engine is reversed, to have the gearbox in front. This primary gearbox typically drives a short shaft forward to a transfer gearbox which reverses the transmission to the main tailshaft which is directed rearwards the propeller, at a "V" angle to the short shaft.

Most V-drives do not include a built-in thrust bearing; a separate thrust bearing may be required if the V-drive is located remotely from the engine. However, depending on the design, some V-drives may have built-in thrust bearings.

A V-drive system variation is for the tailshaft to drive a saildrive propeller, mounted on a skeg below the hull. This is common on Lagoon catamarans.

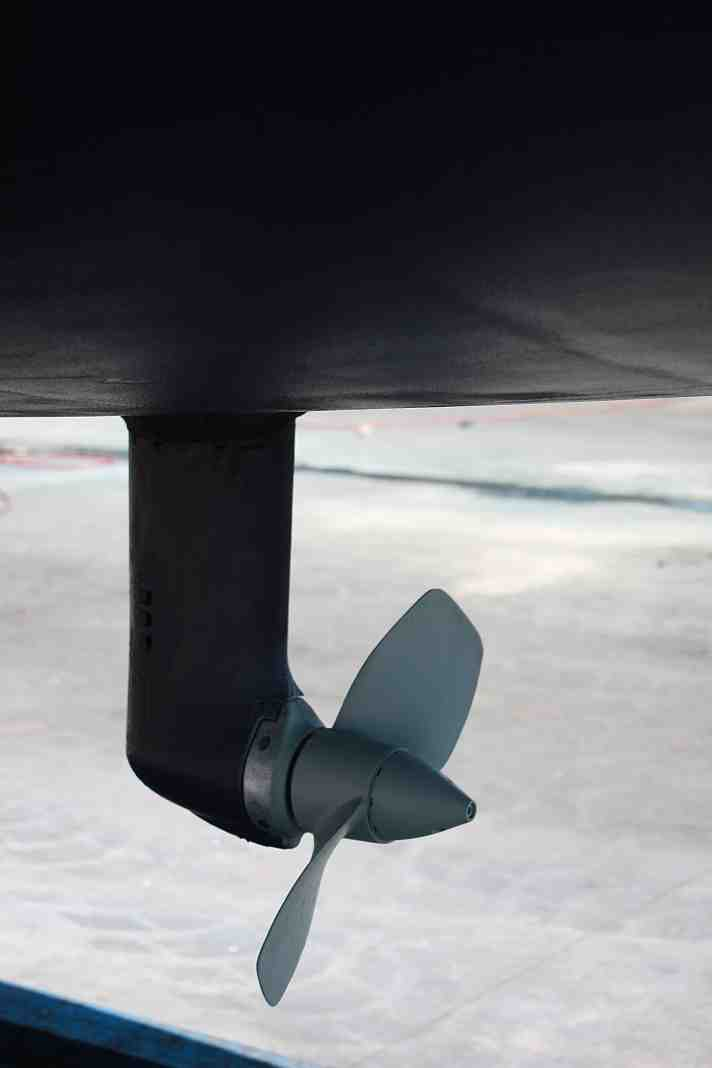
A Volvo saildrive

A variation of the two-shaft V-Drive layout is the "close-coupled V-drive" whereby the engine is still mounted "back-to-front", but the main gearbox incorporates an output flange that has already been reversed. This system obviates the need for any short primary shaft.

Counter-intuitively, a V-drive system will not necessarily mean that the engine is sited further rearward; the whole engine/transmission may be sited forward than in a conventional arrangement.

== V-drive rationales ==
V-drives are typically fitted to (i) sport motorboats or (ii) cruising yachts and catamarans. The pros and cons tend to be different for each type.

For sportboats, a V-drive may be an alternative to an inboard/outboard (I/O) drive. Here the V-drive will allow the engine to be moved further forwards and the propeller (& rudder) will be under the boat. This can give a flatter ride (getting the boat planing earlier), greater choice of propellers, and a safer stern access for swimmers.

For cruising yachts, the rationale of the V-drive installation may include:

- the propeller can be mounted further forward in deeper "quieter water".
- the engine can be mounted in a more space-efficient position.
- the position of the hull's centre of gravity may be optimised,

In all cases, maintenance may be more difficult with a V-drive, since the main propshaft beneath the engine may be somewhat inaccessible. Also, when installing a V-drive, it can be a difficult process to ensure accurate alignment.

== Boats with V-drives ==
Fred Cooper's 1935 design for Malcolm Campbell's Blue Bird used a V-drive designed by Reid Railton for its 2,000 bhp engine.

== See also ==
- Sterndrive
