= Jack Watt (footballer, born 1907) =

Australian rules footballer, born 1907

Personal information
- Full name: John Watt
- Born: 19 June 1907; Northcote, Victoria
- Died: 8 October 1997 (aged 90)
- Original team: Preston
- Height: 177 cm (5 ft 10 in)
- Weight: 74 kg (163 lb)

Playing career^{1}
Years	Club	Games (Goals)
1928–29	Footscray	35 (4)
- ^{1} Playing statistics correct to the end of 1929.

Jack Watt (19 June 1907 – 8 October 1997) was an Australian rules footballer who played with Footscray in the Victorian Football League (VFL).
