= John Watt (cricketer) =

Australian cricketer

Personal information
- Born: 16 February 1858; Hobart, Tasmania, Australia
- Died: 14 November 1914 (aged 56); Glebe, Tasmania, Australia

Domestic team information
- Years: Team
- 1893-1896: Tasmania
- Source: Cricinfo, 16 January 2016

John Watt (16 February 1858 – 14 November 1914) was an Australian cricketer. He played three first-class matches for Tasmania between 1893 and 1896. His son, John Charles Watt, also played first-class cricket for Tasmania.

== See also ==
- List of Tasmanian representative cricketers
