= John Charles Watt =

Australian cricketer

Personal information
- Born: 6 July 1884; Hobart, Tasmania, Australia
- Died: 4 August 1961 (aged 77); Hobart, Tasmania, Australia

Domestic team information
- Years: Team
- 1904/05: Tasmania
- Source: Cricinfo, 16 January 2016

John Charles Watt (6 July 1884 – 4 August 1961) was an Australian cricketer. He played one first-class match for Tasmania in 1904/05. His father, John Watt, also played first-class cricket for Tasmania.

== See also ==
- List of Tasmanian representative cricketers
