= USS Watts =

Fletcher-class destroyer

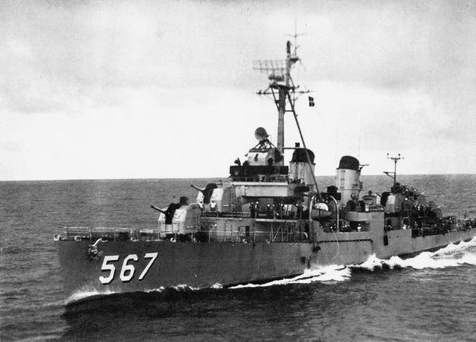
- USS Watts (DD-567) underway, circa 1955

History

United States
- Namesake: John Watts
- Builder: Seattle-Tacoma Shipbuilding Corporation
- Laid down: 26 March 1943
- Launched: 31 December 1943
- Commissioned: 29 April 1944
- Decommissioned: December 1964
- Stricken: 1 February 1974
- Fate: Sold for scrap, 5 September 1974

General characteristics
- Class & type: Fletcher-class destroyer
- Displacement: 2,050 tons
- Length: 376 ft 6 in (114.7 m)
- Beam: 39 ft 8 in (12.1 m)
- Draft: 17 ft 9 in (5.4 m)
- Propulsion: 60,000 shp (45 MW); 2 propellers
- Speed: 35 knots (65 km/h; 40 mph)
- Range: 6500 nmi. (12,000 km) at 15 kt
- Complement: 329
- Armament: 5 × 5 in (130 mm) guns; 4 × 40 mm AA guns; 4 × 20 mm AA guns; 10 × 21 inch (533 mm) torpedo tubes; 6 × depth charge projectors; 2 × depth charge tracks

USS Watts (DD-567) was a Fletcher-class destroyer of the United States Navy.

== Namesake ==
Little is known about John Watts other than that he was an American merchant captain at the end of the eighteenth century and the beginning of the nineteenth. Probably born about 1778, location unknown but most likely in Virginia, he was captain of the 18-gun, armed merchantman Planter in 1799. Watts is remembered for an action between Planter and a 22-gun French privateer which took place on 10 July 1799 in the eastern Atlantic during the Quasi-War with France. During that five-hour engagement, Watts and Planter's 43-man crew successfully fought off two concerted attacks by the more heavily armed Frenchman and thwarted the privateers' attempt to take the American ship. Watts and his crew received a generous reward for their efforts from Lloyd's Coffee House in London, the forerunner of the world-famous insurance company Lloyd's of London.Watts presumably continued in merchant service after the adventure with the French privateer, but he never served in the United States Navy. John Watts died in 1823, again location unknown.

== Construction and commissioning ==
Watts was laid down on 26 March 1943 at Seattle, by the Seattle-Tacoma Shipbuilding Corp.; launched on 31 December 1943, sponsored by Mrs. Judith Bundick Gardner; and commissioned on 29 April 1944.

== 1944 ==
Following two weeks of testing and calibrating equipment in Puget Sound, Watts embarked upon her first voyage on 17 May. She headed for San Diego and a month of shakedown training. She returned to Bremerton, Wash. on 26 June and underwent three weeks of post-shakedown availability. On 12 July, she departed Bremerton in company with battleships Mississippi (BB-41) and West Virginia (BB-48) bound for San Diego. The destroyer remained at San Diego until the 22d, at which time she put to sea in the screen of a Hawaii-bound convoy of troop transports. She arrived in Pearl Harbor on 29 July and remained only until 3 August when she stood out with Destroyer Division 113 (DesDiv 113) and shaped a course for Aleutian waters. On 8 August, Watts led her division mates into port at Adak, Alaska.

During the next seven months, the destroyer operated with the other units of DesDiv 113 as a part of the Navy's North Pacific Force. Since her assignment there came well after America had consolidated her hold on the Aleutians chain, the bulk of Watts' duties consisted of patrols and supply convoy-escort missions between the various outposts scattered across the fog and snow-bound archipelago. On the other hand, she and her division mates did, on occasion, conduct offensive operations against the Japanese Empire—primarily against the northern Kuril Islands.

Her first attempt came after more than two months of operations which might be characterized as routine—as much so as possible in the stormy northern Pacific. On 14 October, she departed Massacre Bay, Attu, for her first bombardment mission with the cruisers and destroyers of the North Pacific Force. Bad weather foiled that mission and the next which began on 24 October. Late in November, however, she departed Attu for her third attempt at bombarding the Kurils. That one proved successful; and, on the night of 23 and 24 November, her guns joined those of the other warships of the force in pounding airfields and installations on Matsuwa To. During the retirement from the Kurils, heavy seas lashed the task force. Fortunately, the same storms which buffeted Watts and her sister ships kept enemy air power grounded, and the bombardment group arrived safely back at Attu on 25 November. After two weeks of badly needed repairs at Dutch Harbor, she returned to Attu on 21 December, following a brief stop at Adak.

== 1945 ==
On 3 January 1945, the destroyer steamed out of Massacre Bay for another sweep of the waters surrounding the northern Kurils. The climax of that operation came on 5 January when she joined in successful shelling of the Suribachi area of Paramushiro. After a brief stop at Attu, Watts moved on to Dutch Harbor with the rest of DesDiv 113. The following month, February, brought two more forays into the waters around the Kurils. However, only the second, which began on 16 February, ended with a bombardment. That one—on the 18th—hit installations in the Kurabi Zaki area of Paramushiro.

After a brief return to Attu, Watts departed the Aleutians on 22 February and headed for Hawaii with Jarvis (DD-799). The two destroyers reached Pearl Harbor on 1 March and began a fortnight of training and voyage repairs. On the 15th, Watts stood out of Pearl Harbor and headed back to the Aleutians for less than a month of operations. On 18 April, DesDiv 113 left the northern Pacific for good. From there, Watts and her division mates headed for Hawaii and three weeks of training in preparation for duty in the recently launched Okinawa invasion. On 5 May, she cleared the Hawaiian Islands and steamed west by way of Eniwetok and Ulithi.

On 21 May, when she arrived at Okinawa, the campaign had been in progress for almost two months, but the Japanese still hung on tenaciously. The members of the Kamikaze Corps continued to hurl themselves at the ships supporting the troops ashore. Watts proved to be a lucky ship while on radar picket station. Not only did her guns help to shoot down six aerial attackers, but she suffered only one really close call. A suicide plane almost managed to crash into her port side forward, but accurate 20-millimeter fire splashed him at the last possible instant, only 10 yards off the destroyer's port bow.

Mercifully, her stay at Okinawa proved brief. In mid-June, she received orders to join the screen of TF 38 at Leyte Gulf, where she arrived on 17 June. For the remainder of the war, Watts screened the fast carriers of TF 38 while their planes flew their last series of sorties against the Japanese home islands. Ranging from Hokkaidō in the north to Kyūshū in the south, those planes helped to decimate enemy shipping, land communications, and military and manufacturing installations. On 23 July, Watts made her own personal contribution to the destruction visited upon the enemy when her guns joined in a bombardment of the outpost island, Chichi Jima, in the Bonins.

The Japanese capitulation on 15 August 1945 found the ship steaming in Japanese waters screening TF 38.

A bit under a month later, on 10 September, she entered Tokyo Bay to begin participation in the occupation of Japan. She remained on that duty until mid-November; then headed back to the United States. After brief stops at Pearl Harbor and San Diego, the destroyer transited the Panama Canal on 7 December and headed for Philadelphia, Pa. on the 18th. Watts arrived at the Philadelphia Naval Shipyard on 23 December and began a three-month inactivation overhaul. In mid-March, she shifted to the Charleston Naval Shipyard, where she was placed out of commission on 12 April 1946.

== 1951–1957 ==
Watts remained in reserve until—to bolster the Navy during the Korean War—she was recommissioned on 6 July 1951.

During the first 42 months of the second phase of her career, Watts operated with the Destroyer Force, Atlantic Fleet. In the late summer and fall of 1951, the warship was fitted out, conducted shakedown, and made a cruise to Guantanamo Bay, Cuba. The spring of 1952 brought a round of exercises, notably "Convex III". That summer, she went into the yard at Philadelphia for overhaul. Refresher training at Guantanamo Bay followed, and then the destroyer resumed normal operations which she continued until the beginning of 1953.

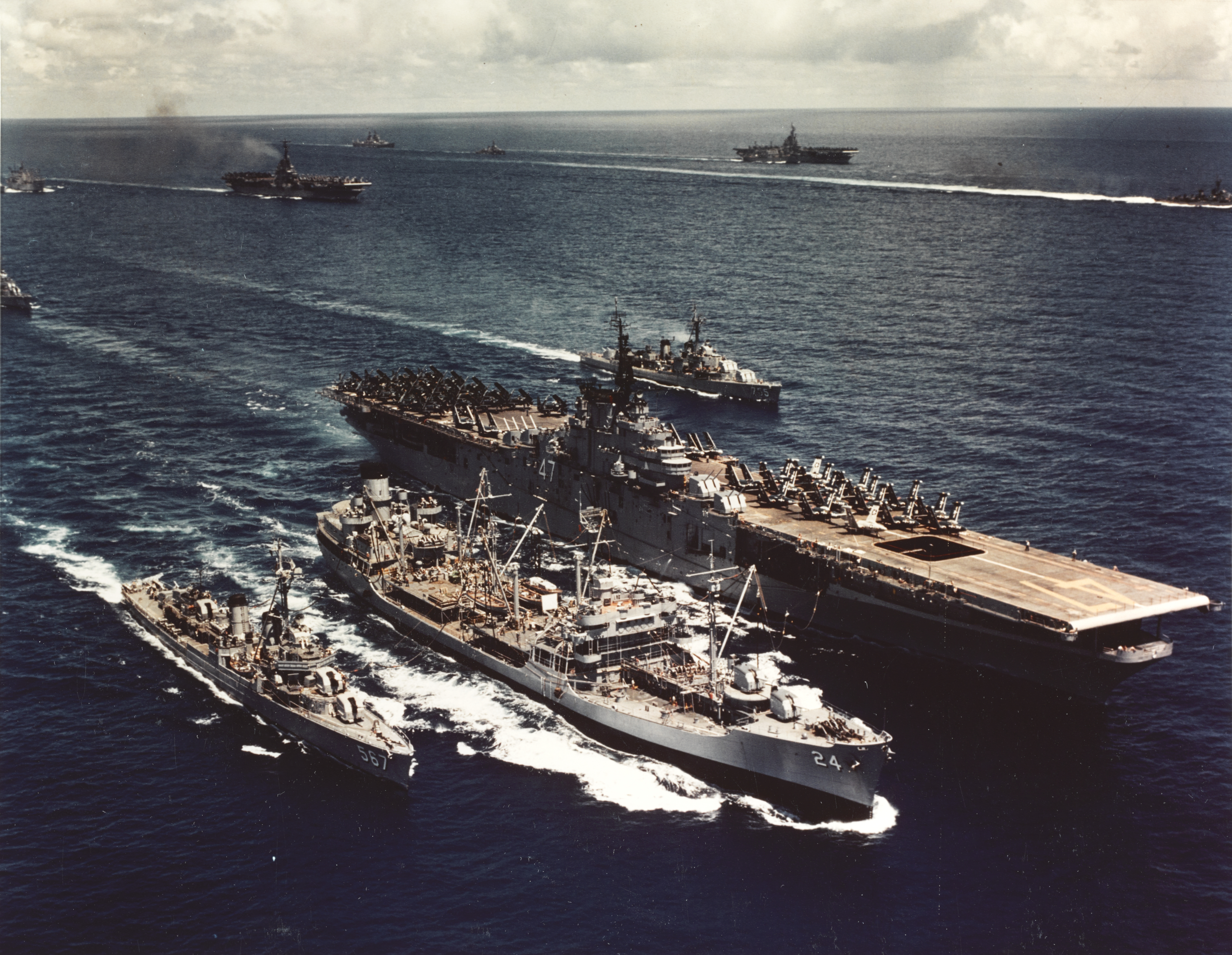
Platte refueling Philippine Sea and Watts, 19 July 1955.

On 7 January, she put to sea from Norfolk, Va. for her first deployment with the 6th Fleet in the Mediterranean Sea. That May, after visits to northern European ports, Watts returned to Norfolk and began operations in the western Atlantic. Her assignment for almost a year centered upon antisubmarine warfare training with the Hunter/Killer Force, Atlantic Fleet. During that time, she made at least one cruise to the West Indies and visited Kingston, Jamaica, and San Juan, Puerto Rico. Her tour of duty with the Hunter/Killer Force ended on 12 April 1954 when she entered the Norfolk Naval Shipyard for another overhaul. The destroyer completed that yard period on 7 July and conducted refresher training in the vicinity of Guantanamo Bay from late July to mid-September, when she resumed duty out of Norfolk.

That assignment continued until December at which time Watts was reassigned to the Cruiser-Destroyer Force, Pacific Fleet. After a voyage which took her to Guantanamo Bay and Havana, Cuba, as well as through the Panama Canal, she arrived in her new home port—Long Beach, Calif.—on 28 January 1955. Between January 1955 and December 1957, the destroyer alternated three deployments to the western Pacific with operations out of Long Beach along the western coast of the United States. During each of her tours of duty with the 7th Fleet, Watts divided her time between escort duty with the carriers of TF 77 and assignments with the Taiwan Strait patrol. Overhauls, type training, and refresher training filled her schedule when she returned to the west coast.

== 1958–1964 ==
In December 1957, the destroyer entered the Long Beach Naval Shipyard for what was to have been her decommissioning overhaul. In June 1958, however, a reprieve arrived in the form of orders to shift home port to Seattle, Wash., and become a Naval Reserve training ship as the flagship of Reserve Escort Squadron 1 (ResCortRon 1). Watts served with the reserve training program for almost four years, from June 1958 to March 1962. Throughout the entire period, the Seattle-Tacoma area remained her base of operations. She provided a platform upon which naval reservists could reacquaint themselves with the intricacies of and skills necessary to constructive Navy service. During her more than three years of reserve training cruises, she ranged the length of the western coast of the United States from San Diego, Calif. in the south to the Canada–US border. She also cruised farther north to make goodwill calls at Canadian ports such as Victoria, British Columbia. During the summer of 1959, she became the first Naval Reserve training ship to participate in a regular Fleet exercise with her reserve crew embarked.

In December 1961, the destroyer was undergoing a yard period when the Berlin crisis developed in Europe. Her reserve crew was called to active duty; and, upon completing the overhaul on 8 January 1962, she departed Puget Sound to return to Long Beach. She completed refresher training out of San Diego on 1 March and departed the west coast for a tour of duty with the 7th Fleet in the Orient. During that cruise, she participated in at least one training operation, a combined antiaircraft-antisubmarine exercise, and visited Midway, Guam, Hong Kong, and Kobe, Sasebo, and Yokosuka, Japan. The easing of tensions in Europe late that spring allowed her to head home at the end of June. The destroyer arrived back in Long Beach on 9 July and, on 16 July, she resumed Naval Reserve training duty at Tacoma.

Watts completed another 30 months training reservists out of the Seattle-Tacoma area. In mid-1963, one of her training cruises took her to Hawaii; but, for the most part, she operated just off the west coast. In December 1964, Watts was decommissioned and placed in reserve at Bremerton. She remained there for almost a decade. On 1 February 1974, her name was struck from the Navy list, and she was sold on 5 September 1974 to General Metals Co., of Tacoma, Wash., for scrapping.

Watts earned three battle stars for her World War II service.
