= Johnny Watts (Australian footballer) =

Australian rules footballer

Personal information
- Full name: John Watts
- Born: 27 September 1883; St Kilda, Victoria
- Died: 25 July 1952 (aged 68); Melbourne, Victoria
- Original team: Sherwood Collegians

Playing career^{1}
Years	Club	Games (Goals)
1905–06, 1910	St Kilda	14 (3)
1907–10	Prahran (VFA)	40 (37)
- ^{1} Playing statistics correct to the end of 1910.

Johnny Watts (27 September 1883 – 25 July 1952) was an Australian rules footballer who played with St Kilda in the Victorian Football League (VFL).
