= Jack Watts =

Jack Watts may refer to:

- Jack Watts (baseball) (active 1913–1921), American baseball catcher
- Jack Watts (politician) (born 1909), New Zealand politician
- Jack Watts (footballer) (born 1991), Australian rules footballer

== See also ==
- John Watts (disambiguation)
