= USS Capella (AK-13) =

Cargo ship of the United States Navy

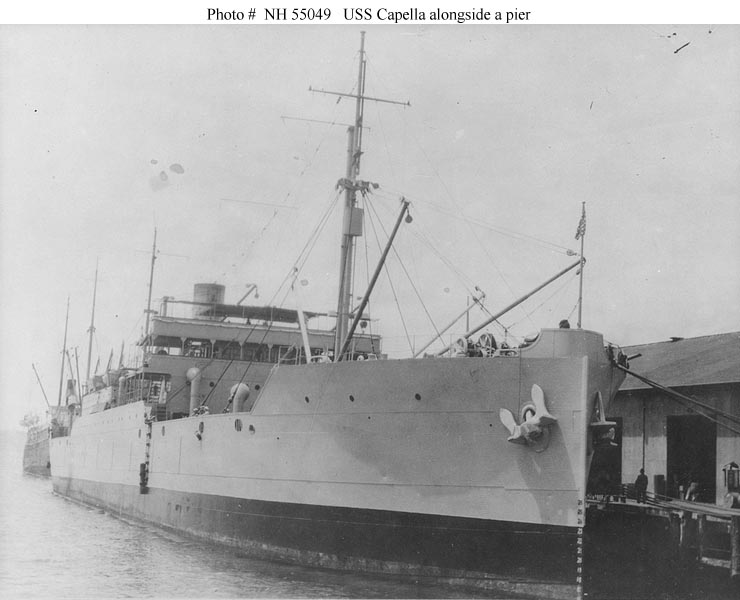
- USS Capella (AK-13) Photographed pierside, probably between 1922 and 1924

History

United States
- Name: Comerant; Capella
- Namesake: Capella (star)
- Builder: American International Shipbuilding Corporation, Hog Island, Pennsylvania
- Laid down: 1 July 1919
- Launched: 3 March 1920
- Completed: 17 April 1920, 77th in the series, and was given the ID number 4215-W
- Acquired: 20 November 1921
- Commissioned: 8 December 1921, as USS Capella (AK-13)
- Recommissioned: 10 November 1938
- Decommissioned: 1 September 1924; 30 November 1945
- Stricken: 19 December 1945
- Identification: Hull symbol:AK-13
- Fate: Sold for scrapping, 2 October 1947, to H.H. Buncher for scrapping by Boston Metals, Baltimore, MD.

General characteristics
- Type: Design 1022 ship
- Displacement: 4,037 t (3,973 long tons) (standard); 11,500 t (11,300 long tons) (full load)
- Length: 401 ft (122 m)
- Beam: 54 ft 1 in (16.48 m)
- Draft: 24 ft 5 in (7.44 m)
- Installed power: 2,500 shp (1,900 kW)
- Propulsion: 1 × General Electric-Curtis steam turbines; 3 × Babcock & Wilcox boilers header-type boilers, 215psi 475°; 1 × shaft
- Speed: 11 kn (13 mph; 20 km/h)
- Capacity: 4,960 DWT
- Complement: 18 officers 253 enlisted
- Armament: 2 × 5 in (130 mm)/51 caliber single-purpose guns (replaced with 1 × 5 in (130 mm)/38 caliber dual-purpose gun); 4 × 3 in (76 mm)/50 caliber dual-purpose guns (added at the end of 1940); 8 × 20 mm (0.79 in) Oerlikon cannons anti-aircraft gun mounts (added in 1942)

USS Capella (AK-13) was a cargo ship in the United States Navy during World War II. She was named for Capella, the star.

== Built in Pennsylvania ==
Capella was built in 1920 as Comerant by American International Shipbuilding Corporation, Hog Island, Pennsylvania, under a Shipping Board contract; acquired by the Navy 20 November 1921; and commissioned 8 December 1921.

== Relief supplies to Japan ==
Capella arrived at San Diego, California, 19 March 1922 to carry cargo along the west coast until July, when she returned to the east coast for similar duty in the next 4 months. Back in California waters in November, Capella sailed to Japan in October 1923 to bring food and medical supplies, donated by American citizens, as well as water for the relief of earthquake-desolated Yokohama.

== Placed in reserve ==
The cargo ship resumed west coast operations until February 1924 when she returned to Norfolk, Virginia. Capella was decommissioned and placed in reserve there 1 September 1924. She was recommissioned 10 November 1938, and resumed supply runs along the east and west coast in alternate periods, on occasion penetrating Alaskan waters.

== Pre-WWII and WWII service ==
During July and August 1940 Capella assisted in the tow of the Navy's 10,700 ton New Orleans floating drydock from Balboa, Panama Canal Zone to Pearl Harbor, Hawaii. Capella and USS Navajo (AT-64) conducted an in-line, tandem tow with logistics support from USS Platte (AO-24). The duration of the operation was 44 days and covered 4,771 nautical miles at an average speed of 4.5 knots.

As war threatened and the United States began the buildup of Western Hemisphere bases acquired from the British, Capella was recalled to the east coast late in September 1940. The veteran cargo ship supported bases from the Panama Canal Zone to Newfoundland with cargoes brought from Atlantic ports until 1944. In June she cleared on the first of four transatlantic convoy crossings to Scotland, and North and West Africa, all so safely guarded as to be made without incident.

On 9 April 1942, while at Jamestown, Rhode Island, Capella was hit by a friendly torpedo accidentally fired from PT-59, causing eight injuries, but no deaths. She was beached to prevent her sinking, repaired, and returned to service.

== Post WWII and decommissioning ==
Capella returned to Caribbean cargo duty in June 1945, and on 30 November 1945 was decommissioned at Norfolk, Virginia. She was transferred to the War Shipping Administration in July 1946.
