= Melville, Rhode Island =

Census-designated place in Rhode Island, United States

- CDP
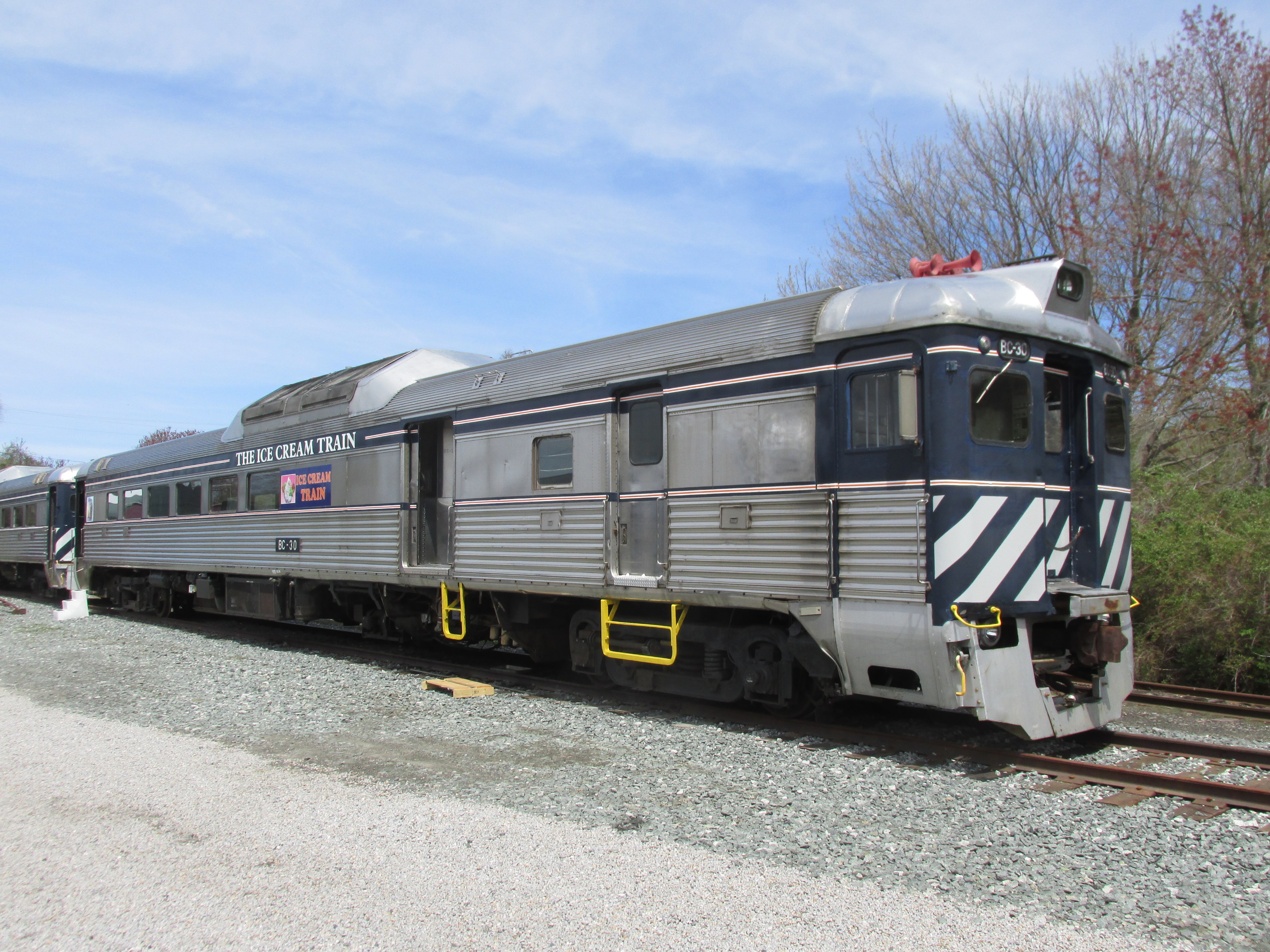
- The Ice Cream Train

- Location in the state of Rhode Island
- Coordinates: 41°35′16.37″N 71°17′3.67″W
- Country: United States
- State: Rhode Island
- County: Newport

Area
  - Total: 5.13 sq mi (13.29 km^{2})
  - Land: 2.10 sq mi (5.43 km^{2})
  - Water: 3.03 sq mi (7.85 km^{2})
- Elevation: 36 ft (11 m)

Population (2020)
  - Total: 1,609
  - Density: 766.9/sq mi (296.12/km^{2})
- Time zone: UTC-5 (Eastern (EST))
  - Summer (DST): UTC-4 (EDT)
- FIPS code: 44-45010
- GNIS feature ID: 2378109

Melville is a census-designated place (CDP) in the towns of Middletown and Portsmouth in Newport County, Rhode Island, United States. It lies along the shore of Narragansett Bay. As of the 2020 census, Melville had a population of 1,609. The CDP is named after Admiral George Wallace Melville. Past names for the area include Portsmouth Grove and Bradford.

== Military history ==
Melville was the site of the Lovell General Hospital during the American Civil War.

In the late 1800s Melville became the site of a U.S. Navy coaling station which was later converted for use as a fuel oil depot.

During World War II, Melville was the site of a PT boat officer training center, the Motor Torpedo Boat Squadrons Training Center. It was closed after World War II ended. Among the officers trained there was future President of the United States John F. Kennedy.

After the Navy's withdrawal from Melville in 1973, the site was redeveloped into a boat yard.

The Navy, as of 2020, uses land in Melville for housing and recreation areas.

== Geography ==
According to the United States Census Bureau, the CDP has a total area of 13.1 km^{2} (5.1 sq mi), of which 5.6 km^{2} (2.2 sq mi) is land and 7.5 km^{2} (2.9 sq mi) (57.23%) is water.

== Places of interest ==
Some locations within Melville CDP include:

- Dyer Island (uninhabited)
- Melville Marina District, also known as Bend Boat Basin, at Coggeshall Point.
- Melville Park, Melville Ponds Campground, and Portsmouth Dog Park, located near a string of ponds
- N&NB Railroad Melville Station (Portsmouth Junction Station), also serving as the headquarters of the RI branch of Rail Explorers.
- Parts of the Naval Station Newport area, including the Naval Undersea Warfare Center, are located within the southern part of the CDP boundaries.

== Demographics ==
Historical population
Census	Pop.	Note	%±
2020	1,609		—
U.S. Decennial Census

=== 2020 census ===
The 2020 United States census counted 1,609 people, 514 households, and 494 families in Melville. The population density was 766.9 people per square mile (296.1 people/km^{2}). There were 550 housing units at an average density of 262.2 units per square mile (101.2 units/km^{2}). The racial makeup was 66.31% (1,067) white or European American (61.59% non-Hispanic white), 9.14% (147) black or African-American, 0.5% (8) Native American or Alaska Native, 6.28% (101) Asian, 0.5% (8) Pacific Islander or Native Hawaiian, 3.85% (62) from other races, and 13.42% (216) from two or more races. Hispanic or Latino of any race was 14.29% (230) of the population.

Of the 514 households, 61.5% had children under the age of 18; 70.6% were married couples living together; 9.9% had a female householder with no spouse or partner present. 11.1% of households consisted of individuals and 3.5% had someone living alone who was 65 years of age or older. The average household size was 3.2 and the average family size was 3.5. The percent of those with a bachelor's degree or higher was estimated to be 40.3% of the population.

35.4% of the population was under the age of 18, 8.2% from 18 to 24, 38.0% from 25 to 44, 14.0% from 45 to 64, and 4.4% who were 65 years of age or older. The median age was 28.6 years. For every 100 females, the population had 101.1 males. For every 100 females ages 18 and older, there were 99.8 males.

The 2016–2020 5-year American Community Survey estimates show that the median household income was $84,550 (with a margin of error of +/- $11,553) and the median family income was $84,300 (+/- $13,598). Males had a median income of $61,521 (+/- $13,570) versus $37,739 (+/- $13,093) for females. The median income for those above 16 years old was $48,486 (+/- $11,432). Approximately, 3.6% of families and 4.7% of the population were below the poverty line, including 6.4% of those under the age of 18 and 40.0% of those ages 65 or over.

=== 2000 census ===
As of the census of 2000, there were 2,325 people, 764 households, and 637 families residing in the CDP. The population density was 415.6 people /km^{2} (1,076 people/mi^{2}). There were 1,012 housing units at an average density of 180.9 units /km^{2} (469 units/mi^{2}). The racial makeup of the CDP was 78.97% White, 9.46% African American, 0.47% Native American, 4.65% Asian, 0.13% Pacific Islander, 2.92% from other races, and 3.40% from two or more races. Hispanic or Latino of any race were 8.39% of the population.

There were 764 households, out of which 61.5% had children under the age of 18 living with them, 74.7% were married couples living together, 6.8% had a female householder with no husband present, and 16.6% were non-families. 14.3% of all households were made up of individuals, and 1.8% had someone living alone who was 65 years of age or older. The average household size was 3.02 and the average family size was 3.36.

In the CDP, the population was spread out, with 37.8% under the age of 18, 9.5% from 18 to 24, 45.9% from 25 to 44, 5.4% from 45 to 64, and 1.4% who were 65 years of age or older. The median age was 26 years. For every 100 females there were 101.6 males. For every 100 females age 18 and over, there were 103.4 males.

The median income for a household in the CDP was $37,314, and the median income for a family was $40,134. Males had a median income of $42,500 versus $20,813 for females. The per capita income for the CDP was $14,789. About 7.7% of families and 7.3% of the population were below the poverty line, including 9.5% of those under age 18 and none of those age 65 or over.
