= PT boat =

World War II patrol torpedo boat

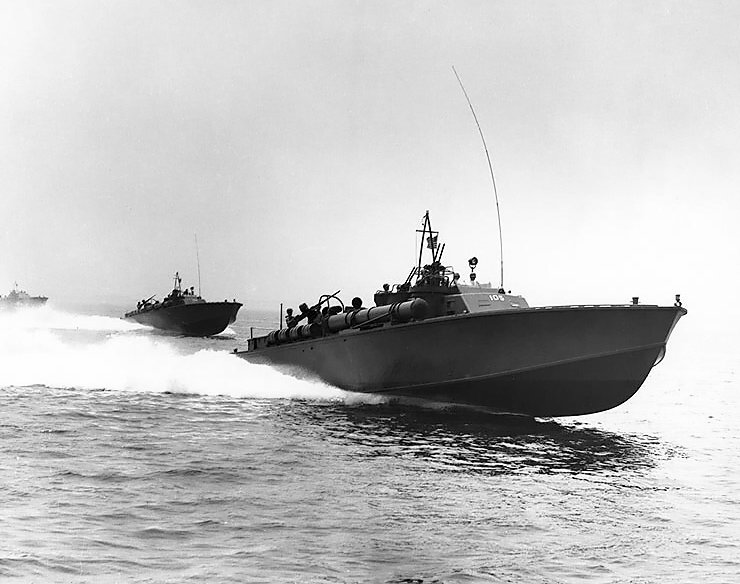
PT-105, an 80' Elco boat, under way

A PT boat (short for patrol torpedo boat) is a motor torpedo boat used by the United States Navy in World War II. These vessels were small, fast, and inexpensive to build, and were valued for their maneuverability and speed. However, PT boats were hampered at the beginning of the war by ineffective torpedoes, limited armament, and comparatively fragile construction that limited some of the variants to coastal waters. In the US Navy they were organized in Motor Torpedo Boat Squadrons (MTBRONs).

PT boats were very different from the first generation of torpedo boats, which had been developed at the end of the 19th century and featured a displacement hull form. These first generation torpedo boats rode low in the water, displaced up to 300 tons, and had a top speed of 25 to 27 kn (46 to 50 km/h). During World War I, Italy, the US, and UK developed the first high-performance, gasoline-powered motor torpedo boats (often with top speeds over 40 kn (74 km/h)) and corresponding torpedo tactics, but these projects were all quickly disbanded after the Armistice. Design of World War II PT boats continued to exploit some of the advances in planing hull design borrowed from offshore powerboat racing and used multiple lightweight but more powerful marinized aircraft-derived V-12 engines, and thus were able to advance in both size and speed.

During World War II, PT boats engaged enemy warships, transports, tankers, barges, and sampans. Some were converted into gunboats which could be effective against enemy small craft, especially armored barges used by the Japanese for inter-island transport. Several saw service with the Philippine Navy, where they were named "Q-boats". Primary anti-ship armament on the standard PT boat was four 21-inch Mark 8 torpedoes, each of which had a 466-pound (211 kg) TNT warhead and a range of 16,000 yards (15,000 m) at 36 knots (67 km/h). Two twin .50-inch (12.7 mm) M2 Browning heavy machine guns were mounted for anti-aircraft defense and general fire support. Some boats carried a 20 mm (0.79 in) Oerlikon cannon. Propulsion was via a trio of Packard 4M-2500 and later 5M-2500 supercharged gasoline-fueled, liquid-cooled V-12 marine engines.

Nicknamed "the mosquito fleet" and "devil boats" by the Japanese, the PT boat squadrons earned a place in the public that remains into the 21st century. Their role was replaced in the U.S. Navy by fast attack craft.

== Development ==
At the outbreak of war in August 1914, W. Albert Hickman devised the first procedures and tactics for employing fast maneuverable seaworthy torpedo motorboats against capital ships, and he presented his proposal to Rear Admiral David W. Taylor, the chief of the US Navy's Bureau of Construction and Repair. In September 1914, Hickman completed plans for a 50-foot (15 m) "Sea Sled" torpedo boat and submitted these to the Navy in hopes of obtaining a contract. While favorably received, Secretary of the Navy Josephus Daniels rejected the proposal since the US was not at war, but Hickman was advised to submit his plans and proposal to the British Admiralty, which was done the following month. The Admiralty found it interesting but thought that "no fast boat of 50' to 60' length would be sufficiently seaworthy", so Hickman built and launched his own privately financed 41-foot (12 m) sea sled capable of carrying a single 18-inch Whitehead Mark 5 torpedo. In February 1915, this Hickman sea sled demonstrated 35 kn (65 km/h; 40 mph) speeds in rough winter seas off Boston to both US and foreign representatives, but again he received no contracts. The Admiralty representative for this sea sled demonstration was Lieutenant G. C. E. Hampden. In the summer of 1915, Lieutenants Hampden, Bremner, and Anson approached John I. Thornycroft & Company about developing a small high speed torpedo boat, and this effort eventually led to the Coastal Motor Boat which first went into service in April 1916.

Meanwhile, in August 1915, the General Board of the United States Navy approved the purchase of a single experimental small torpedo boat that could be transportable. This contract for C-250 ended up going to Greenport Basin and Construction Company. When it was delivered and tested in the summer of 1917, it was not deemed a success, so a second boat (C-378) of the sea sled design was ordered from Hickman in either late 1917 or early 1918 (conflicting dates). Using his previous design from September 1914 and the previous unsuccessful bid for C-250, the C-378 was completed and fully tested just in time to be cancelled as a result of the Armistice. With a full loaded weight of 56,000 lb (25,000 kg), C-378 made a top speed of 37 kn (69 km/h; 43 mph) with 1,400 horsepower (1,000 kW), and maintained an average speed of 34.5 kn (63.9 km/h; 39.7 mph) in a winter northeaster storm with 12-to-14-foot (3.7 to 4.3 m) seas, which would still be considered exceptional even 100 years later.

The sea sled did not surface again as a torpedo boat topic until 1939 but continued to be used by both the Army and Navy as rescue boats and seaplane tenders during the 1920s and 1930s. In 1922, the US Navy reconsidered using small internal combustion engine powered torpedo boats. As a result, two types—45-foot (14 m) and 55-foot (17 m)—of British Royal Navy Coastal Motor Boats were obtained for testing. The larger boat was used for experiments until 1930. In 1938, the US Navy renewed their investigation into the concept by requesting competitive bids for several different types of motor torpedo boats but excluded Hickman's sea sled. This competition led to eight prototype boats built to compete in two different classes. The first class was for 54-foot (16 m) boats, and the second class was for 70-foot (21 m) boats. The resulting PT boat designs were the product of a small cadre of respected naval architects and the Navy.

=== Design competition ===
On 11 July 1938 the Navy solicited design proposals for four separate types of boat: a 165-foot (50 m) subchaser, a 110-foot (34 m) subchaser, a 70-foot (21 m) motor torpedo boat, and a 54-foot (16 m) motor torpedo boat. The winning design proposals would each receive a prize of $15,000 with $1,500 for designs that reached the final part of the competition each to be given out on 30 March 1939.

The larger boat proposal required vessels not to exceed 80 feet in length and to carry at least two 21-inch (53 cm) torpedoes, four depth charges, and two .50-cal machine guns. The performance specification was to achieve 40 knots (74 km/h) with an operating radius of 275 miles (443 km) at top speed and 550 miles (890 km) at cruising speed. The smaller boat proposal required craft to weigh no more than 20 tons so that they could be easily transported by larger cargo ships. Top speed was also to be 40 knots, but specified operating radius was to be 120 miles (190 km) at top speed and 240 miles (390 km) at cruising speed. Armament for the smaller boats was to be either two torpedoes and two depth charges, or .50-cal machine guns and a smokescreen generator.

By September 1938 the U.S. Navy had received 24 design proposals for the small boat and 13 design proposals for the larger 70-foot (21 m) boat. Of those proposals submitted, three 54-ft designs and five 70-ft designs were of interest, and the designers were asked to submit more detailed plans for both the 54 and 70 foot boats by no later than 7 November. On 21 March 1939 Sparkman & Stephens won the prize in the 70-foot class, and George Crouch (for Henry B. Nevins, Inc.) had won the design proposal for the 54-foot class. After winning the design competition for the smaller PT boat, Crouch wrote that Hickman's sea sled design would be far superior "in either rough or smooth water to that of the best possible V-bottom or hard chine design". Earlier when sea sleds were specifically excluded, Crouch had informed the Bureau of Ships that the sea sled was the best type of vessel for the job.

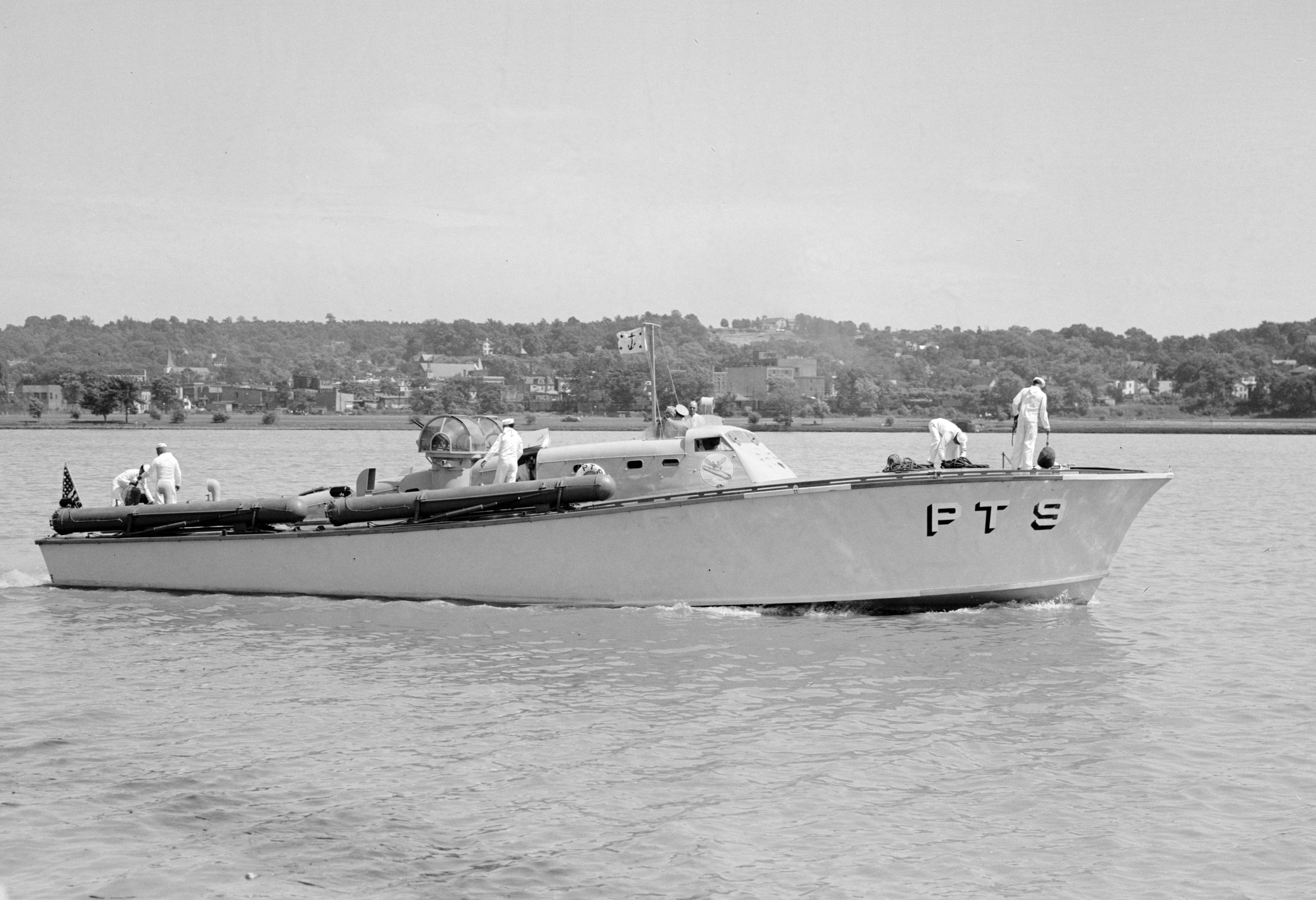
PT-9 in June 1940

Following the competition, contracts were placed for construction of boats: 25 May 1939 to Higgins Industries for two boats (PT5 and PT6) of the Sparkman & Stephens design, scaled up to an overall length of 81 feet (25 m); 8 June 1939 to Miami Shipbuilding (PT-1 and PT-2) and Fisher Boatworks (PT-3 and PT-4) for the Crouch design; to the Philadelphia Navy Yard (PT-7, PT-8) for 81-foot boats designed by the Bureau of Ships. These last two boats were constructed mainly out of aluminum and had 4 engines. Higgins built an additional PT-6 "Prime" redesigned by Andrew Higgins personally using his own methods. Later that same year, Higgins built PT-70 (at their own expense) that incorporated slight improvements over PT-6 Prime.

Later, testing revealed shortcomings that had to be fixed before the designs could meet performance specifications. As a result, the Navy ordered further investigation and refinement of the existing designs until a satisfactory working design could be obtained. At the same time, Henry R. Sutphen of Electric Launch Company (Elco) and his designers (Irwin Chase, Bill Fleming, and Glenville Tremaine) visited the United Kingdom in February 1939 at the Navy's request to see British motor torpedo boat designs with a view to obtaining one that could be used as a check on the Navy's efforts. While visiting the British Power Boat Company, they purchased a 70-foot (21 m) private venture motor torpedo boat (MTB) design—PV70, later renamed PT-9—designed by the power boat racer Hubert Scott-Paine. PT-9 was to serve as the prototype for all the early Elco PT boats. After the initial competition, in late 1939 the Navy contracted Elco to build 11 copies of PT-9.

On 11 October 1940 an agreement between the Navy and Huckins Yacht Corporation was finalized. The Navy would provide engines and Huckins would build a PT boat at their own expense, with the caveat that the boat (upon completion) would be offered to the Navy for a later sum. This 72-foot (22 m) boat (designated MT-72) later became PT-69. Huckins reported a profit of $28.60 on this transaction.

=== Plywood Derby ===
==== Background ====
In March 1941, during a heavy weather run from Key West to New York by Motor Torpedo Boat Squadron 2 (MTBRON 2), Elco 70-footers pounded heavily in 8-to-10-foot (2.4 to 3.0 m) waves even at moderate speeds, and seas continuously broke high over the bows. Operating personnel reported extreme discomfort and fatigue. All boats suffered from some sort of structural failure: forward chine guards ripped away, bottom framing under bows broken, side planking cracked [indicating lack of longitudinal strength], and other weaknesses were reported. In April MTBRON 1 reported enthusiasm over the 81-foot Higgins (PT-6), and with the PT-6 showing such good seakeeping, further purchase of Scott-Paine boats was unnecessary. In early 1941 the U.S. Navy Bureau of Ships lent Packard engines to both Huckins and Higgins, which wanted to build competitive boats at their own expense.

A Chief of Naval Operations PT Boat Conference convened in May 1941 to discuss future PT characteristics. All PTs prior to the 77 ft (23 m) Elcos had been found defective, and it was probable the extended 70 ft (21 m) Elco would not be an improvement. The conference recommended a series of comparative tests to evaluate what turned out to be five new designs of motor torpedo boats. The conference strongly recommended that no more Elco 77-footers be ordered until the tests had shown that they were indeed satisfactory.

==== Board of Inspection and Survey ====
The Board of Inspection and Survey, headed by Rear Admiral John W. Wilcox Jr., conducted comparative service tests off New London, Connecticut, from 21 to 24 July 1941, using the following boats:

- PT-6: 81 ft (25 m) Higgins; 3 Packard 1,200 hp (890 kW) engines.
- PT-8: 81 ft (25 m) Philadelphia Navy Yard; aluminum hull; 2 Allison 2,000 hp (1,500 kW) engines, 1 Hall-Scott 550 hp (410 kW) engine.
- PT-20: 77 ft (23 m) Elco; 3 Packard 1,200 hp (890 kW) engines; equipped with special propellers; special strengthening added to hull framing and deck.
- PT-26, -30, -31, -33: Same as PT-20, except with standard propellers and without special strengthening.
- PT-69: 72 ft (22 m) Huckins; 4 Packard 1,200 hp (890 kW) engines.
- PT-70: 76 ft (23 m) Higgins; 3 Packard 1,200 hp (890 kW) engines.
- One 70 ft (21 m) MRB-8 (Motor Rescue Boat), built for the Royal Navy by Higgins; 3 Hall-Scott 900 hp (670 kW) engines.

Each member of the board conducted an independent inspection of every boat class, evaluating them for structural sufficiency, habitability, access, arrangement for attack control, and communication facilities. Boats were also evaluated under two conditions of armament loading: loaded and fully equipped with four 21 in (53 cm) torpedoes and sufficient fuel to operate 500 NM at 20 knots; and fully loaded with two 21 in (53 cm) torpedoes and ten 300 lb (140 kg) depth charges with sufficient fuel to operate 500 nmi (930 km; 580 mi) at 20 kn (37 km/h; 23 mph). Boats would have their tactical parameters of each design determined by photographs from an airship.

==== First open-ocean trial ====
Lastly, there was a demonstration of seakeeping qualities and hull strength by making a run at maximum sustained speed in the open ocean. An accelerometer was installed in the pilot house of each boat to record "pounding". Conducted on 24 July 1941, this open-water trial, 190 nmi (350 km; 220 mi) at full throttle, was referred to by PT personnel as the "Plywood Derby". The course started from the mouth of New London Harbor, to Sarah Ledge, then led around the eastern end of Block Island, then around Fire Island Lightship, finishing at Montauk Point Whistling Buoy.

At the time, only the Elco 77-footers were loaded with armament. The other competitors had copper ingots added topside (mostly in the turrets) to make up the difference. This resulted in severe conditions for several of the boats during the trial and accounted for the transverse failure in PT-70's deck and subsequent hull failure as the copper fell into the hull. Nine boats participated in the trial. (Note: PT-26 had previously developed deck failures while conducting standardization trials off Block Island on 21 July 1941.) Six boats completed the trial, while three withdrew: PT-33 suffered structural damage off Block Island; PT-70 was damaged by loose copper ingots; and MRB developed engine trouble at the start of the run.

By class, PT-20, an Elco 77-footer, came in first with an average speed of 39.72 kn (73.56 km/h; 45.71 mph); followed by PT-31, with an average speed of 37.01 kn (68.54 km/h; 42.59 mph); PT-69, the Huckins 72-foot (22 m) boat, was third with an average speed of 33.83 kn (62.65 km/h; 38.93 mph); (Note: The Huckins boat experienced a high pressure oil failure and had to go "Dead in the Water" in order to effect the repair.) PT-6, the Higgins 81-footer, with an average speed of 31.4 kn (58.2 km/h; 36.1 mph) was fifth; and PT-8, the Philadelphia Navy Yard boat, was last, at 30.75 kn (56.95 km/h; 35.39 mph). The other two Elco boats, PT-30 and PT 23 (standby boat), followed PT-31, placing before PT-69.

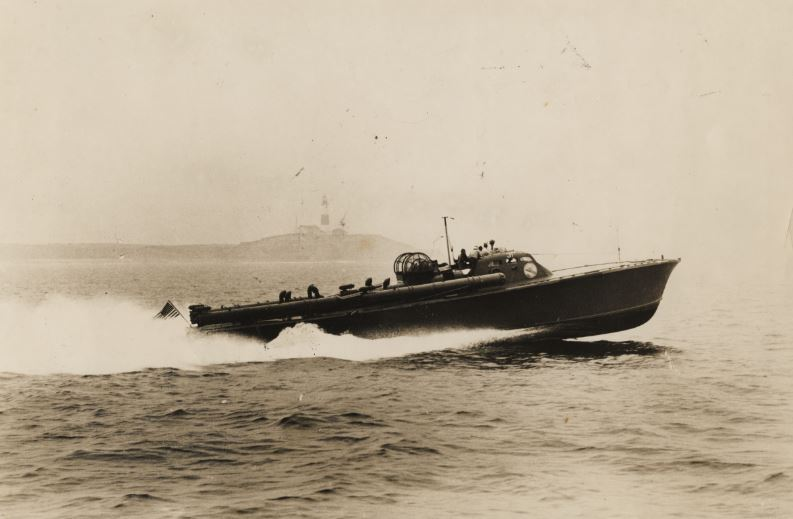
Second place PT-31 crossing the finish line during the "Plywood Derby".

The accelerometers ranked the boats as follows: first was the Philadelphia Navy Yard PT-8 with the least pounding, second was the Huckins PT-69, third was the Higgins PT-6, and last were the Elco 77-footers.

==== Second open-ocean trial ====
Because of the problem with ingot loading, a 185 nmi (343 km; 213 mi) trial with the PTs fully fitted out was conducted on 12 August 1941. Four boats—PT-8, PT-69, PT-70, and MRB—returned and Elco sent two new boats, PT-21 and PT-29. During this trial, boats faced heavier seas, as high as 16 ft (4.9 m). All except the Huckins (PT-69) completed the run. The Huckins withdrew because of a bilge stringer failure. The Higgins 76-footer (PT-70) completed the entire run but also suffered structural failures: attachments between planking and web frames pulled loose and deck fastenings near engine hatches showed extensive failures. PT-21 suffered minor cracks in the deck in the same location, but not to the same extent, as previously observed in PT-26, PT-30, and PT-33. PT-29 was assigned as a pace boat with PT-8 in order to generate a pounding comparison.

The average speed results from the 185 nmi (343 km; 213 mi) course were: Elco 77-footer (PT-21), 27.5 kn (50.9 km/h; 31.6 mph); Higgins 76-footer (PT-70), 27.2 kn (50.4 km/h; 31.3 mph); Higgins MRB and Philadelphia Navy Yard boat (PT-8), 24.8 kn (45.9 km/h; 28.5 mph). Accelerometers were again installed in the pilot house of each boat, but the readings were incomplete because the violent motion of the boats made observations difficult and in some cases necessitated abandonment of the observing stations. Further, many of those taken were beyond the normal range of the instruments and were considered inaccurate. Elco boats were found to pound heavily and confirmed previous reports of crew discomfort.

==== Findings ====
The Elco 77-Footer Design Demonstrates:

1. Ability to make a maximum sustained speed of 39.7 knots; maximum speed 44.1 knots with heavy ordnance load.
2. Maneuverability satisfactory except for a large turning circle of 432 yards (395 m).
3. Space available for four 21" torpedo tubes.
4. Structural weaknesses resulting in transverse fractures of deck planking.
5. Tendency to pound heavily in a seaway.
6. Fittings and finish unnecessarily refined.
7. Cost to the Government fully equipped $302,100.

The Huckins 72-Foot Design Demonstrates:

1. Ability to make a maximum sustained speed of 33.8 knots; maximum speed 43.8 knots with light ordnance load.
2. Maneuverability satisfactory with a turning circle of 336 yards (307 m).
3. Space available for two 21" torpedo tubes and ten 300-pound (140 kg) depth charges.
4. Structural weaknesses resulting in fracture of bilge stringers.
5. Very little tendency to pound in a seaway.
6. Fittings and finish appropriate for a motor torpedo boat.
7. Cost to the Government fully equipped $263,500.

The Navy Yard Philadelphia 81-Foot Design Demonstrates:

1. Ability to make a maximum sustained speed of 30.7 knots; maximum speed 33.9 knots with light ordnance load.
2. Maneuverability unsatisfactory due to inability to reverse outboard engines with a large turning circle of 443 yards (405 m)
3. Space available for two 21" torpedo tubes and ten 300-pound (140 kg) depth charges.
4. Structural strength is adequate.
5. Tendency to pound severely in a seaway.
6. Fittings (Navy standard for combatant ships) entirely too heavy and cumbersome for this type of craft. Finish adequate.
7. Cost to the Government fully equipped $756,400.

The Higgins 81-Foot Design Demonstrates:

1. Ability to make a maximum sustained speed of 31.4 knots; maximum speed 34.3 knots with heavy ordnance load.
2. Maneuverability satisfactory with a turning circle of 368 yards.
3. Space available for four 21" torpedo tubes.
4. Structural strength adequate.
5. Moderate tendency to pound in a seaway.
6. Fittings and finish satisfactory.
7. Cost to the Government fully equipped $206,600.

The Higgins 76-Foot Design Demonstrates:

1. Maximum sustained speed of 27.2 knots in rough seas; maximum speed 40.9 knots.
2. Maneuverability satisfactory, turning circle not determined photographically, estimated 300 yards.
3. Space available for four 21" torpedo tubes.
4. Structural weaknesses caused failures in transverse bottom framing, separation of side planking from framing and extensive failures of deck fastenings.
5. Moderate tendency to pound in a seaway.
6. Fittings and finish satisfactory.
7. Cost to the Government fully equipped $265,500.

The board arrived at the following recommendations:

1. That the Packard power plant having been found highly satisfactory be adopted as standard for future construction.
2. That the ordnance installation of future motor torpedo boats consist of two torpedo tubes, machine guns and depth charges.
3. That the Huckins 78-foot (PT-69) design be considered acceptable for immediate construction.
4. That the Higgins 80-foot (PT-6) design suitably reduced in size to carry such ordnance loads as are required by our Navy be considered acceptable for immediate construction.
5. That the Elco 77-foot design be considered acceptable for future construction provided changes in the lines are made to reduce the tendency to pound in a seaway, and the structure be strengthened in a manner acceptable to the Bureau of Ships.
6. That the Philadelphia 81-foot boat (PT-8) be stripped of excess weight and be re-engined with three Packard engines.

The board also had the following opinion on structural sufficiency: "During the first series of tests (21–24 July) the Huckins design (PT-69), the Philadelphia design (PT-8) and the Higgins design (PT-6) completed the open sea endurance run without structural damage. The Higgins 70' (British) boat did not complete this run because of engine trouble. The Higgins 76' (PT-70) and boats of the Elco 77' (PT-20 Class) developed structural failures even under moderate weather conditions prevailing. In the interval between the first and second test periods the PT-70 was repaired and an effort made to eliminate the causes of the structural failures. However, during the second endurance run, which was made in a very rough sea for this size boat, structural failures again occurred in PT-70. PT-69 and PT-21 experienced structural failures during the second run though these were much more localized as compared with those found on PT-70. The Board is of the opinion that certain changes in design are required to enable PT-69 and boats of the PT-20 Class to carry safely their military loads in rough weather."

The board results provided very important benchmarks in the infancy of PT boat development. This type of craft presented design challenges that were still issues decades after, but there are some significant conclusions from the above recommendations and their order of merit. Those are:

1. The Packard were the engines of choice.
2. The Huckins 72-foot (PT-69) and a reduced Higgins 81-foot (PT-6) design were to be placed into production. Following an October 1941 BuShips conference and its new set of navy design requirements which included room to support four 21 in (53 cm) torpedoes and an upper length restriction of 82', the next two orders for pre-war PT boats (PT-71 through PT-102) were awarded to Higgins and Huckins.
3. Even though the Elco 77-footers posted the fastest speeds, all seven Elcos suffered from structural damage and severe pounding causing the Board to recommend a redesign to correct these deficiencies. Elco competed for the PT-71 to PT-102 contract but did not win due to their higher unit price. After the start of the war and significantly revising their unit cost, Elco received the next PT boat order after Higgins and Huckins. This was to be their new Elco 80-foot design.

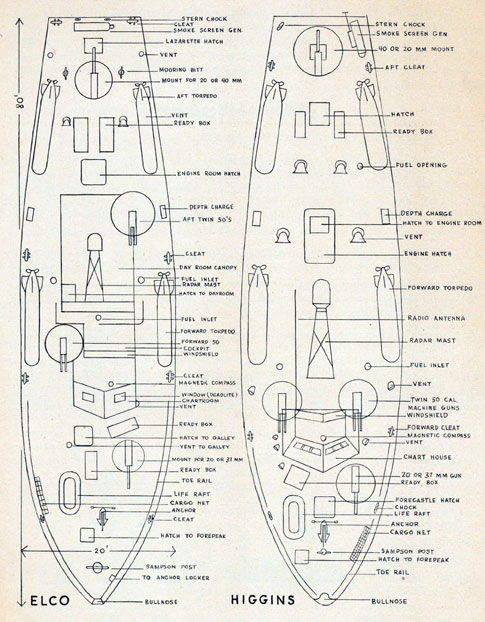
Elco and Higgins PT boats, as published in a 1945 training manual

=== Elco ===
The newly designed 80 ft (24 m) Elco Naval Division boats were the longest of the three types of PT boats built for the Navy used during World War II. By war's end, more of the Elco boats were built (326 in all) than any other type of motor torpedo boat. While comparable in size to many wooden sailing ships in history, these 20 ft 8 in (6.30 m) beam wooden-hulled craft were classified as boats in comparison with much larger steel-hulled destroyers, destroyer escorts, and corvettes. Five Elco boats were manufactured in knock-down kit form and sent to Long Beach Boatworks for assembly on the West Coast as part of an experiment and as a proof of concept.

=== Higgins ===
Higgins Industries produced 199 78 ft (24 m) boats of the PT-71/PT-235, PT-265 and PT-625 classes. The Higgins boats had the same beam, full load displacement, engines, generators, shaft horsepower, trial speed, armament, and crew accommodation as the 80 ft (24 m) Elco boats. Many Higgins boats were sent to the Soviet Union and Great Britain at the beginning of the war, so many of the lower-numbered squadrons in the U.S. Navy were made up exclusively of Elcos. U.S. Navy PT boats were organized into MTBRONs. The first Higgins boats for the U.S. Navy were used in the battle for the Aleutian Islands (Attu and Kiska) as part of Squadrons 13 and 16, and others (MTBRON15 and MTBRON22) in the Mediterranean against the Germans. They were also used during the D-Day landings on 6 June 1944.

Even though only half as many Higgins boats were produced, far more survive (seven hulls, three of which have been restored to their World War II configuration) than the more numerous Elco boats. Of the Elco boats, only three hulls (one restored) were known to exist as of 2016.

=== Huckins Yacht Corporation ===
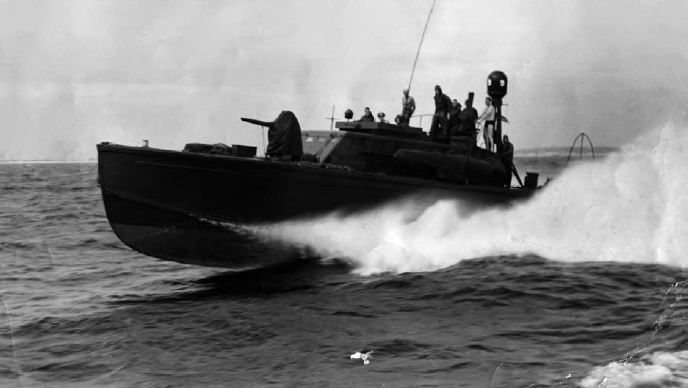
Huckins 78-foot (24 m) PT-259 underway near Midway c.1944

Huckins and his innovative Quadraconic planing hull design were latecomers to PT boat design. Not invited to participate in the original design competition, by late 1940, Huckins had a meeting with Captain James M. Irish, Chief of Design, and offered to build a "planing seagoing hull" PT boat, on the condition the Navy loan Huckins engines and agree to look at the Huckins boat. In early July 1941, the Navy accepted PT-69.

After obtaining excellent testing results at the Plywood Derby, the Navy awarded Huckins Yacht Corporation a contract in 1941 for 8 boats, and later added 10 more. The design was enlarged and modified to meet the new requirements. The first three of the new design (PT-95 through PT-97) were initially kept in the Jacksonville, Florida, area for testing, resulting in several important modifications to the overall design (these boats were later assigned to Squadron 4 in 1942).

Huckins ended up building just two squadrons of PT boats during World War II. Five 78-foot (24 m) boats were assigned to Squadron 14 (PT-98 through PT-102) which was commissioned in early 1943; and ten boats assigned to Squadron 26 (PT-255 thru PT-264) which was commissioned in mid 1943. They were assigned to specific outposts in the Panama Canal Zone, Miami, Florida, the Hawaiian Sea Frontier at Pearl Harbor and Midway, and a Melville Motor Torpedo Boat Squadrons Training Center.

Although not used in any other PT boat design, Huckins licensed the use of his patented Quadraconic hull in his PT boat construction. He also granted permission for Elco, Higgins, and the Philadelphia Navy Yard to use his patented laminated keel, which increased hull strength, although neither Elco nor Higgins chose to use it on their boats. Most probably due to the lateness in joining the PT boat program and unlike Elco and Higgins, the Huckins yard was not provided government support to construct a larger facility prior to the war. The handcrafted Huckins PT was produced at their civilian facility at a speed of one per month. The success and ruggedness of the Huckins' 78-foot seagoing design is demonstrated by Squadron 26's constant ready-boat operations and fleet torpedo boat training in the oceans around Midway and Hawaii during the last two years of the war.

=== Vosper and other types of PT boats ===
Vospers of Great Britain arranged for several boatyards in the United States to build British-designed 70 ft (21 m) motor torpedo boats under license to help the war effort. The boatyards were located in Annapolis, Bristol, City Island, Miami, and Los Angeles. 146 boats, armed with 18 in (460 mm) torpedoes, were built for Lend Lease, and exported to Allied powers such as Canada, Britain, Norway, and the Soviet Union. These boats were never used by the U.S. Navy, and only about 50 were used by the Royal Navy; most were passed to other countries. The Canadian Power Boat Company produced four Scott-Paine designed PTs for the U.S. These were to be provided to the Dutch forces under Lend Lease but were re-requisitioned to the USN as PT 368–371 after the fall of the Netherlands to German forces.

== Construction ==
PT boats offered accommodation for three officers and 14 enlisted men. Crews varied from 12 to 17, depending upon the number and type of weapons installed. Full-load displacement late in the war was 56 tons.

The hull shapes of the Elco and Higgins PT boats were similar to the contoured "planing hull" found in pleasure boats of the time (and still in use today): a sharp V at the bow softening to a flat bottom at the stern. A common characteristic of this type of contoured hull is the "rooster tail" in the wake. Unlike the actual "planing hull" Huckins, which planed at 10-11 knots, the Elco and Higgins PT boats were intended to plane at higher speeds (PT 71 and PT-103 classes at around 27 knots, and the PT-265 and 625 classes at around 23 knots).

The Elco, Higgins and Huckins companies used varying lightweight techniques of hull construction. Though often said to be made of plywood, the hulls were actually made of two diagonal layered 1 in (25 mm) thick mahogany planks, with a glue-impregnated or lead-painted layer of canvas in between. Holding all this together were thousands of bronze screws and copper rivets. This type of construction made it possible for damage to the wooden hulls of these boats to be easily repaired at forward operating bases by base force personnel. According to Robert McFarlane, the US Navy built the hulls of some PT boats partially from 3,000-year-old white cedar logs recovered from sphagnum bogs in New Jersey.

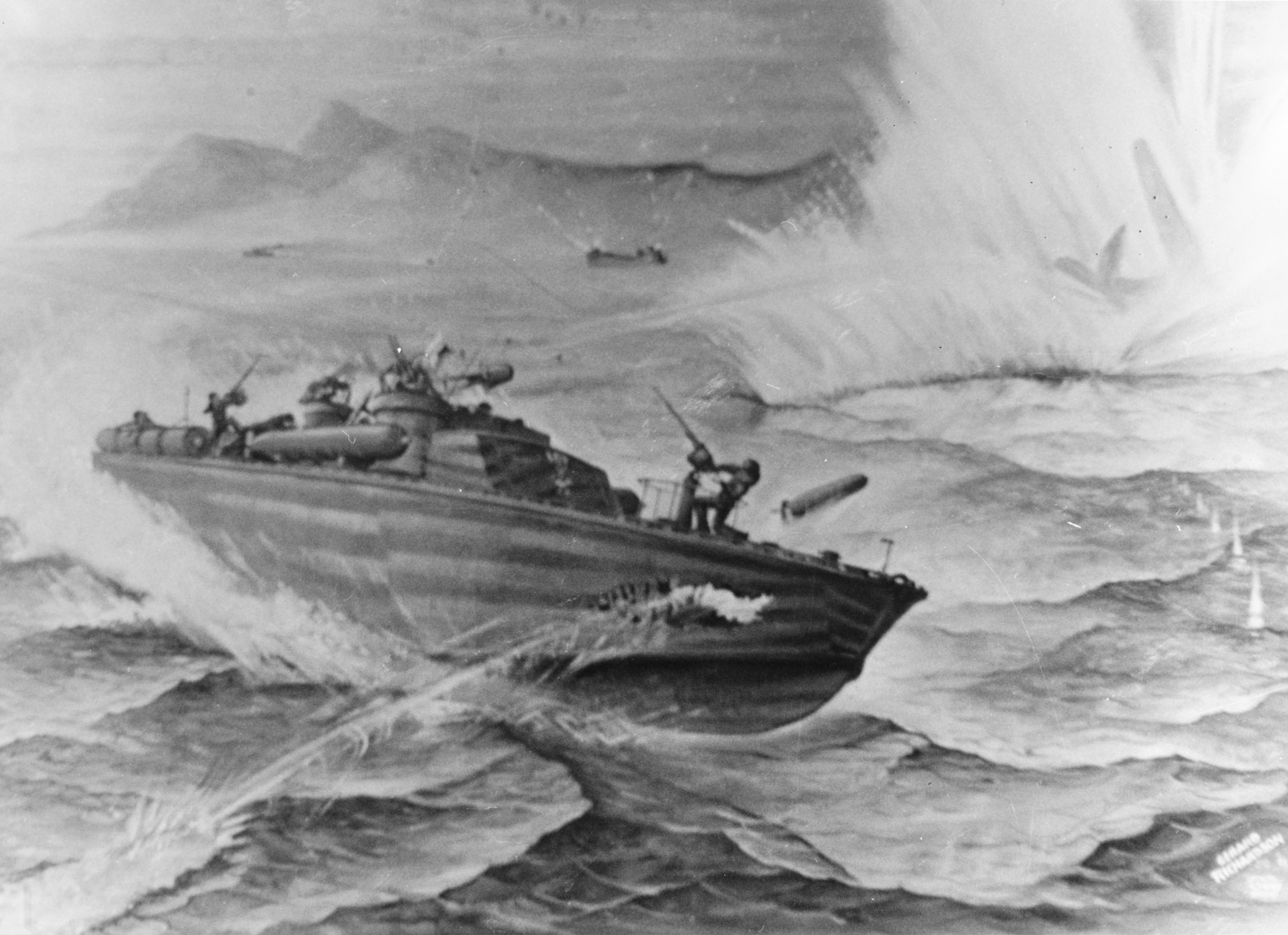
USS PT-167 is holed by an enemy torpedo that failed to detonate, 5 November 1943. Painting by Gerard Richardson

As a testament to the strength of this type of construction and watertight bulkheads, several PT boats withstood catastrophic battle damage and still remained afloat. For example, the forward half of future President John F. Kennedy's PT-109 (Elco) stayed afloat for 12 hours after she was cut in half by the Japanese destroyer Amagiri. PT-323 (Elco) was cut in half by a kamikaze aircraft on 10 December 1944 off Leyte, yet remained floating for several hours. PT-308 (Higgins) had her stern sheared off by a collision with PT-304 during a night mission in the Mediterranean on 9 March 1945 and yet returned to base for repairs. PT-167 (Elco) was holed through the bow off Bougainville Island on 5 November 1943 by a torpedo which failed to detonate; the boat remained in action and was repaired the next day.

In 1943, an inquiry was held by the Navy to discuss planing, hull design, and fuel consumption issues. This resulted in the November 1943 Miami test trial between two Higgins and two Elco boats, but no major additional modifications were made before the end of the war. During the war, Elco came up with stepped hull designs ("ElcoPlane") which achieved significant increase in top speed. Higgins developed the small and fast 70-foot (21 m) Higgins Hellcat, which was a slight variation on their original hull form, but the Navy rejected them for full production because of increased fuel consumption and other considerations.

After the war, Lindsay Lord, who was stationed in Hawaii during the war, recorded the Navy's planing hull research and findings in Naval Architecture of Planing Hulls. It covers PT boat hull design and construction and provides hull test data as well as detailed analysis of the various PT boat designs.

== Armament ==
The primary anti-ship armament was two to four Mark 8 torpedoes, which weighed 2,600 pounds (1,179 kg) and contained a 466-pound (211 kg) TNT warhead. These torpedoes were launched by Mark 18 21-inch (530 mm) steel torpedo tubes. Mark 8 torpedoes had a range of 16,000 yards (14,630 m) at 36 knots (67 km/h; 41 mph). These torpedoes and tubes were replaced in mid-1943 by four lightweight 22.5-inch-diameter (570 mm) Mark 13 torpedoes, which weighed 2,216 pounds (1,005 kg) and contained a 600-pound (270 kg) Torpex-filled warhead. These torpedoes were carried on lightweight Mark 1 roll-off style torpedo launching racks. The Mark 13 torpedo had a range of 6,300 yards (5,800 m) and a speed of 33.5 knots (62.0 km/h; 38.6 mph).

PT boats were also armed with numerous automatic weapons. Common to all US PT boats were the two twin M2 .50 cal (12.7 mm) machine guns. Early PT boats (Elco PT20 through PT44) mounted Dewandre plexiglas-enclosed hydraulically operated rotating turrets. Almost immediately after the attack on Pearl Harbor, the Dewandre turrets were replaced on the entire PT boat fleet with open-ring twin mounts. The ring mount was designed by both Elco and Bell and designated Mark 17 Twin 50 caliber aircraft mount. Part of the Mark 17 Mod 1 and Mod 2 ring mount consisted of the Bell Mark 9 twin cradle. Another automatic weapon commonly mounted on PT boats was the 20 mm Oerlikon cannon. On early series of boats, the cannon was mounted on the stern. Later in the war, several more of these 20 mm cannons were added amidships and on the forward deck.

Forward of the chart house of some early Elco 77-foot (23 m) boats (PT20 through PT44) were twin .303 cal (7.7 mm) Lewis machine guns on pedestal mounts. Beginning in mid-1943, some boats were fitted with one or two .30 cal Browning machine guns on the forward torpedo racks on pedestal mounts.

Occasionally, some front line PT boats received ad hoc up-fits, where they mounted such weapons as 37 mm aircraft cannons, rocket launchers, or mortars. When these weapons were found to be successful, they were incorporated onto the PT boats as original armament. One such field modification was made to Kennedy's PT-109, which was equipped with a single-shot Army M3 37 mm anti-tank gun that her crew had commandeered; they removed the wheels and lashed it to 2x8 timbers placed on the bow only one night before she was lost. The larger punch of the 37 mm round was desirable, but the crews looked for something that could fire faster than the single-shot Army anti-tank weapon. Their answer was found in the 37 mm Oldsmobile M4 aircraft automatic cannon cannibalized from crashed P-39 Airacobra fighter planes on Henderson Field on Guadalcanal. After having demonstrated its value on board PT boats, the M4 (and later M9) cannon was installed at the factory. The M4/M9 37 mm auto cannon had a relatively high rate of fire (125 rounds per minute) and large magazine (30 rounds). These features made it highly desirable because of the PT boat's ever-increasing requirement for increased firepower to deal effectively with the Japanese Daihatsu-class barges, which were largely immune to torpedoes because of their shallow draft. By the war's end, most PTs had these weapons.

The installation of larger-bore cannons culminated in the fitting of the 40 mm Bofors gun on the aft deck. Starting in mid-1943, the installation of this gun had an immediate positive effect on the firepower available from a PT boat. The Bofors cannon had a firing rate of 120 rounds per minute (using 4-round clips) and had a range of 5,420 yards (4,960 m). This gun was served by a crew of 4 men and was used against aircraft as well as shore bombardment or enemy surface craft.

=== Gunboats ===
In the Solomon Islands in 1943, three 77-foot (23 m) PT boats, PT-59, PT-60, and PT-61, were converted into "PT gunboats" by stripping them of all original armament except the two twin .50 cal (12.7 mm) gun mounts, then adding two 40 mm and four twin .50 cal (12.7 mm) mounts. Lieutenant Kennedy was the first commanding officer of PT-59 after its conversion. On 2 November 1943, PT-59 participated in the rescue of 40 to 50 Marines during the raid on Choiseul and a foundering Landing Craft, Personnel (Ramp) (LCP(R)) which was under fire from Japanese soldiers on the beach.

Late in the war, a new electrically powered multiple gun mounting was developed by Elco for PT boats, known as the 'Thunderbolt'. At least three different versions appear to have been built and tested; one with six .50-cal Browning M2 machine-guns and two 20 mm Oerlikon cannon, another with two .50-cal machine-guns and four 20 mm cannon and a version with just the four cannon. In mid-1944, the cannon-only version of the Thunderbolt was experimentally fitted to four operational 80 ft Elco boats which served with PTBRON 29 in the Mediterranean theatre: These were PTs 556-559. Photographic evidence shows that these boats landed their torpedoes and did not operate as torpedo craft when shipping the large and heavy Thunderbolt. According to Bulkley in chapter 18 of 'At Close Quarters' the multiple 20 mm mounting was anticipated to be "of limited usefulness" against "well compartmented F-lighters" where even the 40 mm Bofors struggled to inflict serious damage.

The weapon was trialled operationally on the nights of July 16/17 and July 18/19, when PT 558 (Ens. Aalton D. Monaghan) patrolled off the Antibes area with two regular 40 mm-armed boats and on both occasions engaged small single patrol boats; both craft were sunk by the combined gunfire of the American patrol. Lt Cmdr Daunis reported that "The Elco Thunderbolt mount has been used in two gunnery attacks and has proven to be an exceptional weapon."

=== Other armament ===
Towards the end of the war, beginning in 1945, PTs received two eight-cell Mark 50 rocket launchers, launching 5 in (130 mm) spin-stabilized flat trajectory Mark 7 and/or Mark 10 rockets with a range of 11,000 yards (10,000 m). These 16 rockets plus 16 reloads gave them as much firepower as a destroyer's 5-inch (127 mm) guns broadside (albeit without their accuracy). By war's end, the PT boat had more "firepower per ton" than any other vessel in the U.S. Navy fleet. PT boats also commonly carried between two and eight Mark 6 depth charges in roll-off racks. A few PT boats were equipped to carry naval mines launched from mine racks, but these were not commonly used.

== Engines ==
With the exception of the experimental PT boats, all US PT boats were powered by three marine-modified derivations of the Packard 3A-2500 V-12 liquid-cooled, gasoline-fueled aircraft engine. Improvements upon Packard's World War I Liberty L-12 2A engine, the successive "M" for "marine" designated 3M-2500, 4M-2500, and 5M-2500 generations all featured slight changes and more power. Their superchargers, intercoolers, dual magnetos, and two spark plugs per cylinder reflected their aircraft origins.

Packard's licensed manufacture of the famed Rolls-Royce Merlin aircraft engine alongside the marine 4M-2500 has long been a source of confusion. Only the British-built PT-9 prototype boat brought from England for Elco to examine and copy featured a Merlin. The 4M-2500 initially generated 1,200 hp (890 kW). It was subsequently upgraded in stages to 1,500 hp (1,100 kW), allowing a designed speed of 41 knots (76 km/h). The 5M-2500 introduced in late 1945 had a larger supercharger, aftercooler, and increased power output of 1,850 hp (1,380 kW). It could push fully loaded boats at 45 to 50 knots (83 to 93 km/h). However, subsequent additions of weaponry offset this potential increase in top speed.

Fuel consumption of any version of these engines was exceptionally heavy. A PT boat carried 3,000 US gallons (11,400 L) of 100 octane aviation fuel, enough for a 4M-2500 equipped boat to conduct a maximum 12-hour patrol. Some 200 US gallons (760 L) per hour were consumed at a cruising speed of 23 knots (43 km/h), increasing to 500 US gallons (1,900 L) per hour at top speed. Hull fouling and engine wear could both decrease top speed and increase fuel consumption materially.

== Service ==
PT boats operated in the southern, western, and northern Pacific, as well as in the Mediterranean Sea and the English Channel.

=== Early use ===
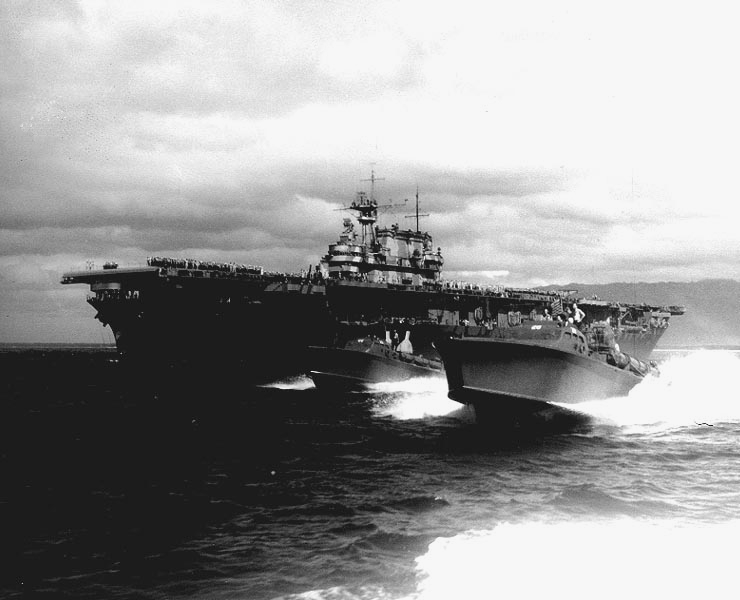
USS Hornet with PT-28 and PT-29

Originally conceived as anti-ship weapons, PT boats were publicly credited with sinking several Japanese warships during the period between December 1941 and the fall of the Philippines in May 1942—even though the Navy knew the claims were all false. The exaggerated claims by Lieutenant John D. Bulkeley, commanding officer of Motor Torpedo Boat Squadron Three (MTBRON 3), about the effectiveness of the PTs in combat against larger craft allowed him to recruit top talent, raise war bonds, and caused overconfidence among squadron commanders who continued to pit PTs against larger craft. The reality was his claims that PTs had sunk a Japanese cruiser, a troopship, and a plane tender in the Philippines were untrue.

Compounding the difficulty with the early torpedoes, PT boat crews attacking at night may have sometimes failed to note a possible torpedo failure. Although the American Mark 8 torpedo did have problems with porpoising and circular runs, it could and did have success against common classes of targets. The Mark 3 and Mark 4 exploders were not subject to the same problems as the Mark 6 exploders on U.S. submarines' Mark 14 torpedoes. Difficulties remained in spite of Bulkeley's claim that introduction of the Mark 13 torpedo to PT boats in mid-1943 all but eliminated the early problems that PT boats had with their obsolete Mark 8s. In the August 1943 engagement in which PT-109 was lost, fifteen boats shipping 60 torpedoes fired over half with no hits on an enemy vessel.

=== Night attacks ===
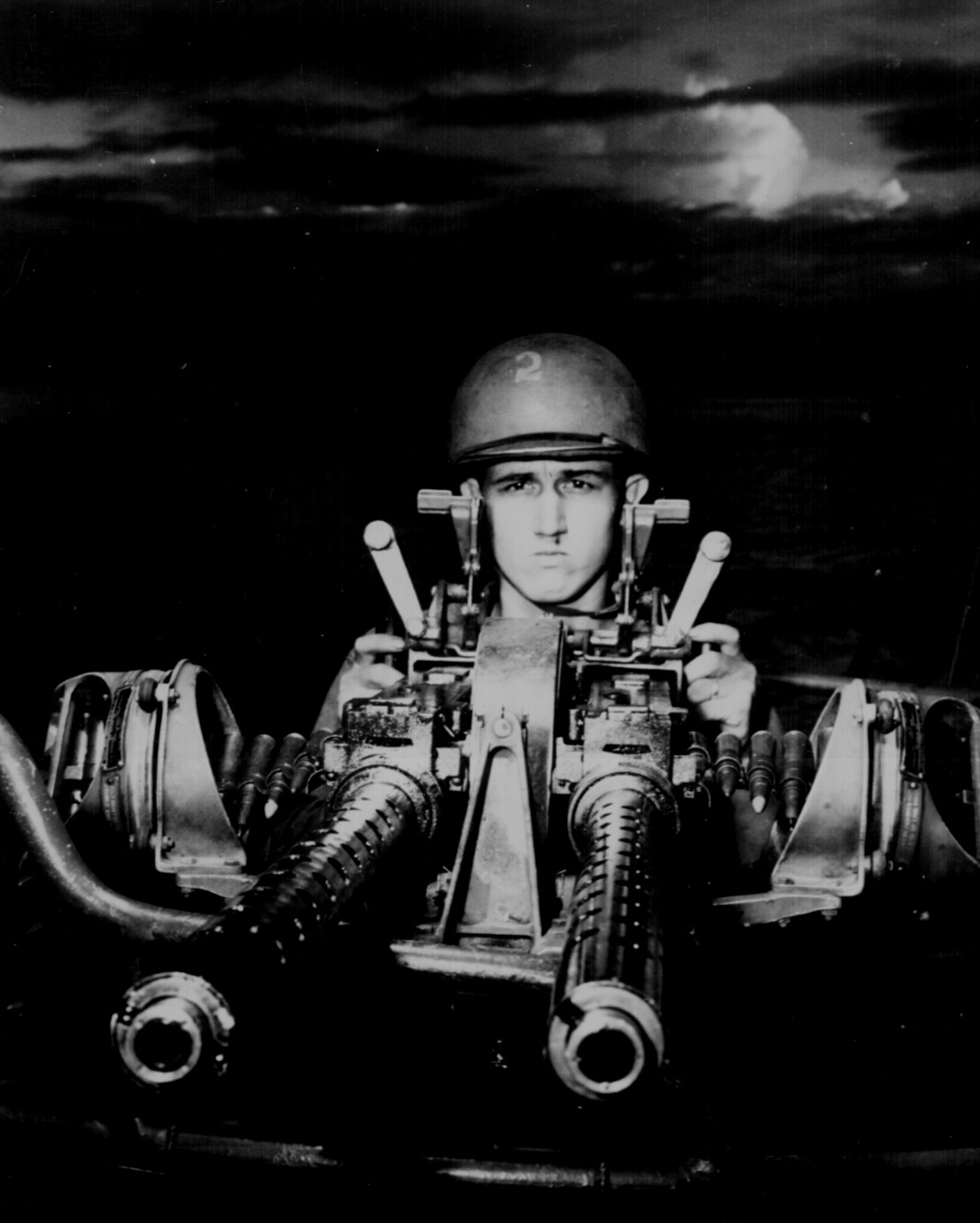
PT boat gunner mans a twin .50 caliber M2 Browning machine gun off New Guinea

PTs usually attacked at night. The cockpits of PT boats were protected by armor plate against small arms fire and splinters. Direct hits from Japanese guns sometimes caused catastrophic gasoline explosions with near-total crew loss. Crews feared attack by Japanese seaplanes, which were difficult to detect even with radar, but which could easily spot the phosphorescent wake left by PT propellers. Bombing attacks killed and wounded crews even with near misses. There are several recorded instances of PT boats trading fire with friendly aircraft. Several PT boats, such as PT-346, were lost by friendly fire from both Allied aircraft and destroyers. Enemy forces used searchlights or seaplane-dropped flares to illuminate fleeing PT boats.

Initially, a few boats were issued primitive radar sets. U.S. Navy PTs were eventually fitted with Raytheon SO radar, which had about a 17 nmi (20 mi; 31 km) range. Radar gave Navy PTs a distinct advantage in intercepting enemy supply barges and ships at night. As more PTs were fitted with dependable radar, they developed superior night-fighting tactics, allowing them to locate and destroy many enemy targets.

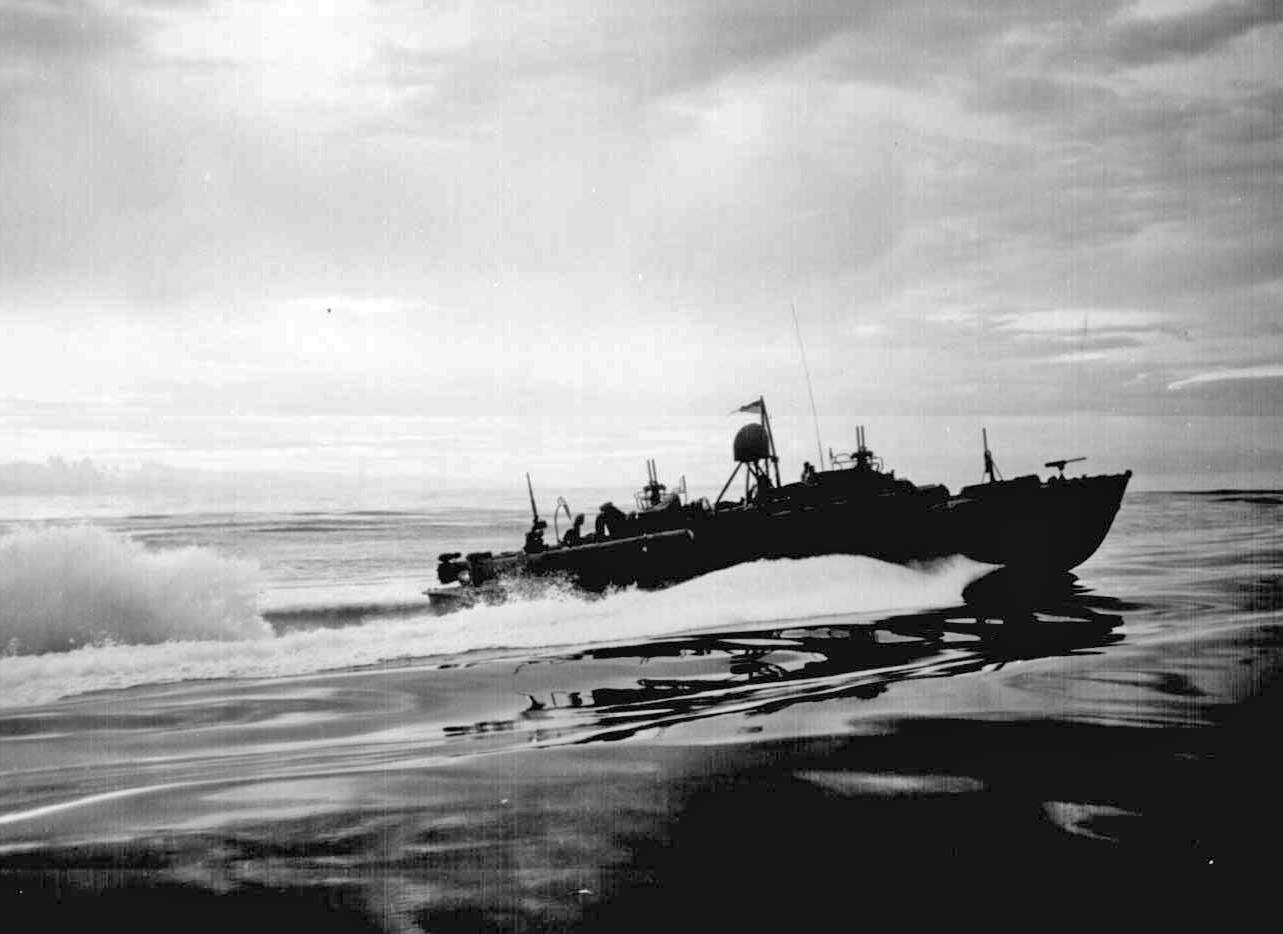
An 80-foot (24 m) Elco PT boat with original Mark 18 torpedo tubes on patrol off the coast of New Guinea, 1943

During some of these nighttime attacks, PT boat positions may have been given away by a flash of light caused by grease inside the black powder-actuated Mark 8 torpedo tubes catching fire during the launching sequence. In order to evade return fire from the enemy ships, the PT boat could deploy a smoke screen using stern-mounted generators. Starting in mid-1943, the old Mark 18 torpedo tubes and Mark 8 torpedoes began to be replaced by the new Mark 1 roll-off torpedo launcher rack loaded with an improved Mark 13 aerial torpedo. This eliminated the telltale flash of light from burning grease, did not use any form of explosive to launch the torpedo, and weighed about 1,000 lb (450 kg) less than the previous tubes.

=== Solomon Islands campaign ===
The effectiveness of PT boats in the Solomon Islands campaign, and countering "Tokyo Express" Japanese resupply in New Georgia Sound, was substantially undermined by defective Mark 8 torpedoes. The Japanese were cautious when operating their capital ships in areas known to have PT boats, knowing how dangerous their own Type 93 torpedoes were and assuming the Americans had equally lethal weapons.

The PT boats off Guadalcanal were given credit for several sinkings and successes against the Tokyo Express. In several engagements, the mere presence of PTs was sufficient to disrupt heavily escorted Japanese resupply activities at Guadalcanal. Squadrons (MTBRON) 2, 3, 5 and 6 would lie in wait to ambush targets from torpedo range, generally about 1,000 yards (910 m). Afterwards, the PT mission in the Solomon Islands was deemed a success.

=== D-Day invasion ===
Some PT boats served during the Battle of Normandy. During the D-Day invasion, PTs patrolled the "Mason Line", forming a barrier against the German S-boats attacking the Allied landing forces. They also performed lifesaving and anti-shipping mine destruction missions during the invasion.

=== Barge attacks ===
Perhaps the most effective use of PTs was as "barge busters." Since both the Japanese in the New Guinea area and the Germans in the Mediterranean had lost numerous resupply vessels to Allied air power during daylight hours, each attempted to resupply their troop concentrations by using shallow draft barges at night in very shallow waters. The shallow depth meant Allied destroyers were unable to follow them, and the barges could be protected by an umbrella of shore batteries.

The efficacy of the PT boats at sinking the Japanese supply barges was considered a key reason that the Japanese had severe food, ammunition, and replacement problems during the New Guinea and Solomon Island campaigns, and made the PT boats prime targets for enemy aircraft. The use of PT boat torpedoes was ineffective against these sometimes heavily armed barges, since the minimum depth setting of the torpedo was about 10 feet (3 m) and the barges drew only 5 feet (1.5 m). To accomplish the task, PTs in the Mediterranean and the Pacific (and Royal Navy and Royal Canadian Navy motor torpedo boats in the Mediterranean) installed more and heavier guns which were able to sink the barges.

Although their primary mission continued to be attack on surface ships and craft, PT boats were also used effectively to lay mines and smoke screens, coordinate in air-sea rescue operations, rescue shipwreck survivors, destroy Japanese suicide boats, destroy floating mines, and carry out intelligence or raider operations.

=== Repair training ===
In 1944, several Higgins 78-foot (24 m) boats (PT222, PT-283, PT-284, PT-285, and PT-282) were converted, releasing PT-59, PT-60, and PT-61 for transfer back home to the Motor Torpedo Boat Squadrons Training Center in Melville, Rhode Island, for use in training in hull repair techniques.

== Boats ==
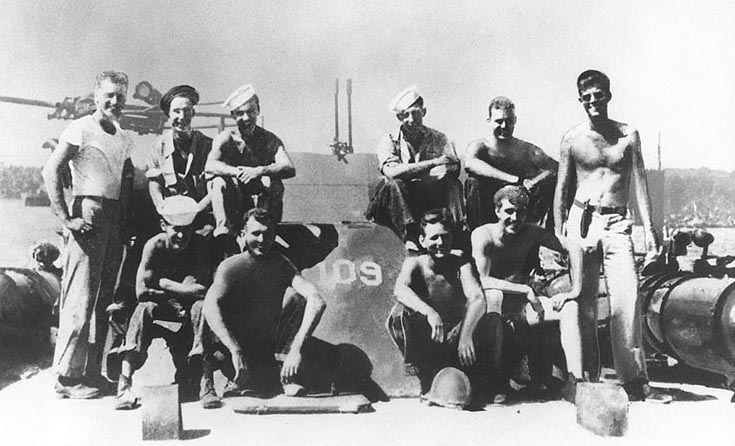
Lieutenant (junior grade) John Kennedy (right) with his PT-109 crew

Many PT boats became famous during and after World War II:

- PT-41, commanded by Ensign George E. Cox, Jr. USNR, carried General Douglas MacArthur in his escape from Corregidor Island, Philippines. Lieutenant John D. Bulkeley, commanding officer of MTBRON 3, was awarded the Medal of Honor for his operations in the Philippines before rescuing MacArthur. Bulkeley's story inspired a book and the movie They Were Expendable, which was based on it. PT-41 was the flagship of MTBRON 3, based in the Philippines in 1941–1942.
- Life magazine published an article about the PT boat captains in the battles off Guadalcanal, featuring the exploits of Lieutenants "Stilly" Taylor, Leonard A. Nikoloric, Lester Gamble, and Robert and John Searles; the article mentioned many boats in MTB Squadrons Two and Five (in particular, PT-36, PT-37, PT-39, PT-44, PT-46, PT-48, PT-59, PT-109, PT-115, and PT-123).
- Other PT boats gaining fame during the war were PT-363 and PT-489, the boats used by Lieutenant Commander Murray Preston to rescue a downed aviator in Wasile Bay off Halmahera Island, for which Preston was awarded the Medal of Honor.
- PT-109, commanded by Lieutenant, junior grade, John F. Kennedy, was made famous through Robert J. Donovan's 1961 book PT-109: John F. Kennedy in World War II and the 1963 film based on it, PT 109.
- PT-59 was commanded by Kennedy after the loss of PT-109. Its remains have (possibly) been discovered in the Harlem River in the Inwood, Manhattan, section in New York City.

== Losses ==
According to the book "At Close Quarters: PT Boats in the United States Navy," 99 of the 531 PT boats that served during World War II were lost to various causes.

- Accidents, friendly fire, sea conditions – 32
- Scuttled to prevent capture – 27
- Rammed by the enemy – 8
- Kamikaze – 2
- Hit naval mine – 9
- Enemy coastal artillery – 6
- Strafed – 8
- Enemy naval gunfire – 7

== Surviving boats ==
At the end of the war, almost all surviving U.S. PT boats were disposed of shortly after V-J Day. Hundreds of boats were stripped of all useful equipment and then dragged up on the beach and burned. This was done to minimize the amount of upkeep the Navy would have to do, since wooden boats require much continuous maintenance, and they were not considered worth the effort. The boats also used a lot of high octane fuel for their size, making them too expensive to operate for a peacetime Navy. Much of this destruction (121 boats) occurred at PT Base 17 on Samar, Philippines, near Bobon Point.

=== Production boats ===
A few (one 80' Elco, one 72' Vosper, and three 78' Higgins) were cut up and destroyed between 1998 and 2008, leaving (a known) total of 12 PT boats, and 2 experimental PT boat hulls in various states of repair, surviving today in the U.S.:

PT-48

PT-48 is possibly the last surviving 77-foot (23 m) Elco PT boat. In July 1942, PT-48 (nicknamed "Prep Tom" and "Deuce") was assigned to MTBRON 3(2). This second Squadron 3 was the first to arrive in the Solomons and saw heavy engagement with the "Tokyo Express". PT-48 was one of the first 4 boats to arrive at Tulagi on 12 October 1942. On the night of 13/14 October 1942, PT-48 engaged a Japanese destroyer at 200 yards (180 m). PT-48 is today in need of major restoration, after having been cut down to 59 feet (18 m) and used as a dinner cruise boat. Because of this boat's extensive combat history, having survived 22 months in the combat zone at Guadalcanal (more time in combat than any other surviving PT boat), a preservation group, "Fleet Obsolete" of Kingston, New York, acquired and transported it to Rondout Creek in 2009 for eventual repair.

PT-305

One of two fully restored and operational PT boats and the only combat veteran of the two, PT-305 ("Half Hitch", "Barfly", "USS Sudden Jerk") is a Higgins 78-foot (24 m) boat, assigned during the war to MTBRON-22, and saw action against the Germans in the Mediterranean Sea. Squadron 22 was operating with the British Royal Navy Coastal Forces, and saw action along the northwest coast of Italy and southern coast of France. In June 1945 the squadron was shipped to the U.S. for refitting and transfer to the Pacific, but the war ended while still in New York. PT-305 was cut down to 65 feet (20 m) for use as an oyster seed boat in Crisfield, Maryland. PT-305 was acquired by the Defenders of America Naval Museum (DOANM), and then sold in May 2007 to the National World War II Museum in New Orleans. After a lengthy restoration PT-305 has been restored to a seaworthy, operational vessel. It was relaunched in March 2017.

PT-309

A 78-foot (24 m) Higgins, PT-309 ("Oh Frankie!") was assigned during the war to MTBRON 22 and saw action against the Germans in the Mediterranean Sea. The squadron was operating under the British Coastal Forces and saw action along the northwest coast of Italy and southern coast of France. In April 1945 the squadron was shipped to the U.S. for refitting and transfer to the Pacific, but the war ended while still in New York. PT-309 was named in honor of Frank Sinatra, who the boat's commanding officer met at a nightclub shortly before MTBRON 22 left New York for the Mediterranean Theatre. PT-309 is located at the National Museum of the Pacific War in Fredericksburg, Texas, and was restored by the Defenders of America Naval Museum. PT-309 is restored (but non-operational) in a static diorama display without engines installed. Her external restoration was completed in 2002.

PT-459

PT-459 ("Mahogany Menace") a Higgins 78-foot (24 m) boat, was assigned to MTBRON 30 on 15 February 1944. MTBRON 30 saw action in the English Channel as part of the Invasion of Normandy. In late June 1945 the squadron was shipped to the U.S. for refitting and transfer to the Pacific, but the war ended while still in New York. After the war, she was cut down to 65 ft (20 m) and highly modified into a sightseeing boat and fishing trawler. She was acquired by Fleet Obsolete in June 2008 and moved to Kingston, New York, for possible restoration.

PT-486

PT-486, an 80-foot (24 m) Elco boat, was placed in service on 2 December 1943. It was used in the training squadron MTBRON 4 in Melville, Rhode Island, during World War II until it was placed out of service 16 January 1946. In 1952 it was used as an excursion vessel from Otten's Harbor in Wildwood, New Jersey. The boat was renamed "Big Blue" and used until 2002. It is currently owned by Fleet Obsolete, with plans for possible restoration.

PT-615

PT-615, an 80-foot (24 m) Elco originally assigned to MTBRON 42, was commissioned after the war ended. PT-615 was returned to Elco after being sold and was heavily modified into a yacht, which was leased to actor Clark Gable. He named the boat Tarbaby VI and used her through the 1950s. The boat was serviced and stored by Elco. She was sold several times, and moved to Kingston, New York for possible restoration.

PT-617

PT-617 is an 80-foot (24 m) Elco boat located at the Battleship Cove Naval Museum in Fall River, Massachusetts. She was obtained from the backwaters of Florida and moved to its current location by PT Boats Inc. Full restoration was completed in 1989. She is available for public viewing and has portions of her hull cut away to display the cramped interior of the crew's quarters.

PT-657

PT-657, a Higgins 78-foot (24 m) boat, has been converted into a charter fishing boat. She is located in San Diego and is now named Malihini.

PT-658, a 78' Higgins boat, in Measure 31-20L Camouflage, Portland, Oregon

PT-658

PT-658 is a 78-foot (24 m) Higgins boat, and along with PT-305, is one of two authentically restored and operational U.S. Navy PT boats afloat today. Relaunched after hull restoration in 2005, it is located at Pier 308, Vigor Shipyard in Portland, Oregon's Swan Island Lagoon. Maintained by an all volunteer group, it is powered by the three Packard V12 5M-2500 gas engines and includes all weapons, electronics, equipment and accessories restored to appear as they did when she went into service. PT-658 was added to the National Register of Historic Places in 2012.

PT-724

PT-724, a surviving Vosper built at the Annapolis Boat yard in Maryland, has been used as a yacht and has since been acquired by the Liberty Aviation Museum to be restored back to its original Vosper configuration.

PT-728

PT-728, a surviving Vosper boat built under license at the Annapolis Boat Yard in Maryland, was restored in Key West, Florida. Her deck house was reconfigured to partially resemble an 80-foot (24 m) Elco instead of its original Vosper 70 ft configuration. PT-728 was acquired by Fleet Obsolete and moved to Kingston. There PT-728 allows up to 49 tourists the chance to ride on a "PT boat". This boat is the only U.S. Coast Guard regulation-approved PT boat licensed to take passengers for hire, and the only surviving U.S.-built Vosper design. In spring of 2012, PT-728 was acquired by the Liberty Aircraft Museum of Port Clinton, Ohio, for further restoration.

PT-766

PT-766 is an 80-foot (24 m) Elco boat that is a private yacht ("Finished Business") located in Washington D.C. She represents the final class of Elco's with significant updates to the superstructure and radar and was intended for MTBRON 44 but was cancelled due to the end of the war.

PT-796

PT-796 ("Tail Ender") is a 78-foot (24 m) Higgins. After the war ended PT-796 was used in the Key West/Miami area for experimental purposes. She was retired from service in the late 1950s. Shortly after her retirement from service, the PT-796 was used as a float during President John F. Kennedy's inaugural parade to represent PT-109, with the PT-109 hull number painted on the bow, and several of PT-109's surviving crew members manning the boat. Today, PT-796 is located at the Battleship Cove Naval Museum in Fall River, Massachusetts, in a Quonset hut-style building, protected from the weather and up on blocks. The boat is owned by PT Boats, Inc., a World War II PT veterans organization headquartered in Germantown, Tennessee.

=== Experimental boats ===
PT-3

Two experimental PT boats survive, PT-3 (built by Fisher Boat Works) in New Jersey and PT-8. PT-3 was designed by George Crouch and employed lightweight planing hull construction methods. A 59-foot (18 m) barrel-back (which provided increased strength to the sides and deck), a unique double longitudinal planked (mahogany outer planking and Port Orford cedar inner planking) lightweight hull on bent laminated oak framing, she was the "featherweight" of transportable PT boat design, but was later rejected by the Navy during trials in 1941 after being deemed too short to carry 4 torpedoes, as well as being able to only launch torpedoes stern first, which was a procedure considered too dangerous by BuOrd. PT-3 and PT-8 were both part of Motor Torpedo Boat Squadron 1 (MTBRON 1) during the testing period. After testing was completed, PT-3 was transferred to Canada in April 1941 under lend-lease. PT-3 served with the RCAF Fleet as the RCAF Bras d'Or M413 (B119) based at Eastern Air Command in Halifax. She was transferred back to the United States in April 1945.

PT-8

PT-8 (built at Philadelphia Naval Shipyard) in Louisiana was built entirely from aluminum but did not pass the speed acceptance criteria for use as a PT boat for the U.S. Navy because of its weight. She was reclassified as a harbor patrol boat (YP 110) for the duration of the war. PT-8 was stored in a yard for several decades in Baytown, Texas, but has since moved.

UK Vosper

The two Vosper boats in England were built by Vosper, and the first is in fairly good condition at Portsmouth. The second UK built boat is in private hands, floating on a canal north of London and being used as a private residence, though it is remarkably intact in its World War II configuration.

=== Exported PT boats ===
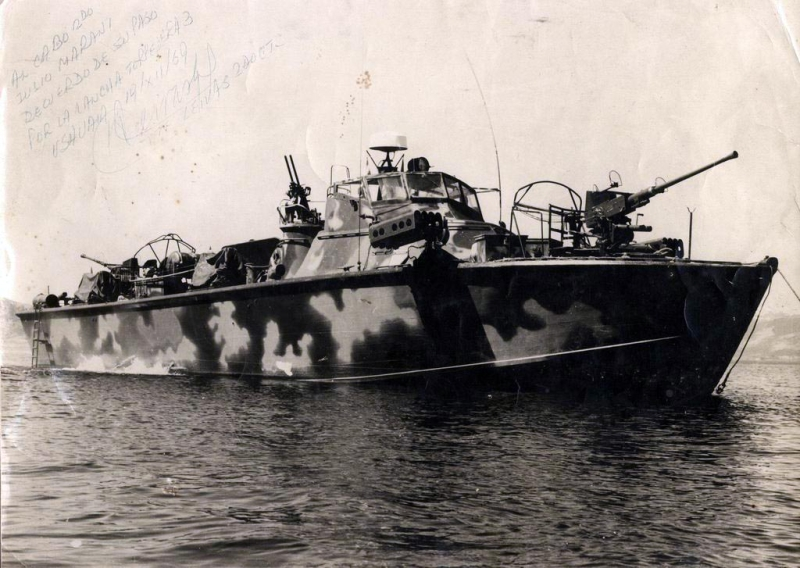
ARA Alakush, Ushuaia, Argentina (1962)

Ten Higgins boats were delivered in 1948 for use by the Argentine Navy during the late 1940s up until the late 1970s. All of these boats are now retired from naval use, with two still in civil use today as sightseeing boats on Mar del Plata: the Leonardo da Vinci and the Mar de la Plata. The other six boats, including the Alakush and Ara Towwora, are in various states of disrepair, sunk or scrapped. The Ara Towwora, is in state of disrepair at Ushuaia Harbor.

== Movie stand-ins ==
The original 1962–66 McHale's Navy TV series used a Vosper design PT-694 Prior to starring in the television series this boat was purchased as war surplus by Howard Hughes and was used as the camera chase boat when the Spruce Goose made its only flight. The stern of the Vosper boat is visible in the footage of that event.

In John Ford's 1945 war film, They Were Expendable, two 80-foot (24 m) Elcos were used during filming along with four former MTBRON 14 78-foot Huckins.

The 1943 film Crash Dive, filmed during World War II, featured a full squadron of PT boats.

For the 1962 movie PT 109, several 82-foot (25 m) USAF crash rescue boats were converted to resemble 80-foot Elcos when the few surviving boats were found to need too much work to make them seaworthy for use during the film.

== See also ==
- British Power Boat Company, producer of the PT boat prototype
- Fairmile D motor torpedo boat (British "Dog Boats")
- E-Boats (German equivalent)
- MAS (motorboat) (Italian equivalent)
- Wooden boats of World War 2
- List of patrol vessels of the United States Navy
