= USS Claude V. Ricketts =

Charles F. Adams-class destroyer

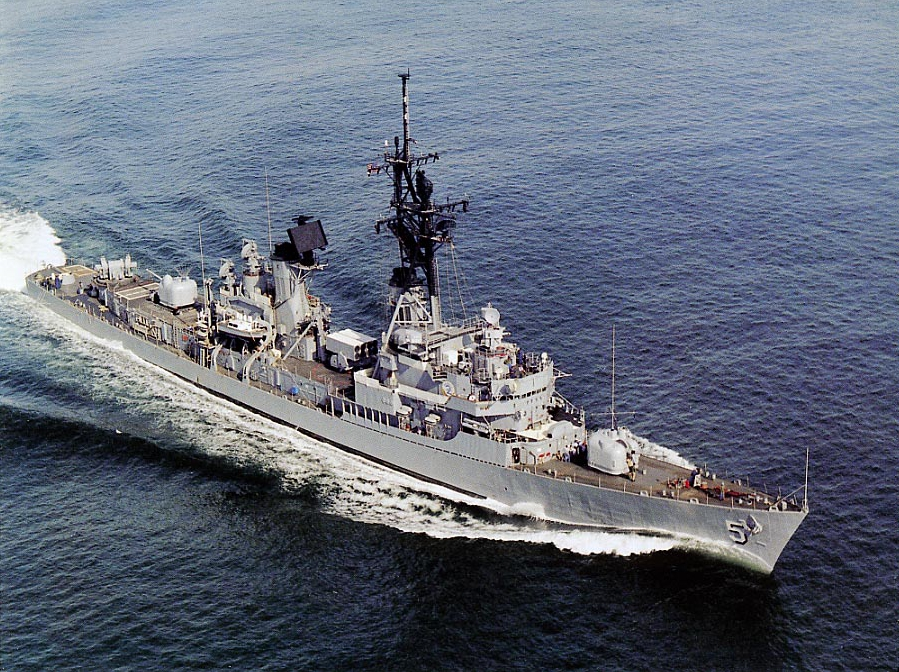
- USS Claude V. Ricketts underway in 1986

History

United States
- Name: Biddle
- Namesake: Nicholas Biddle
- Ordered: 28 March 1957
- Builder: New York Shipbuilding Corporation
- Laid down: 18 May 1959
- Launched: 14 June 1960
- Acquired: 2 May 1962
- Commissioned: 5 May 1962
- Renamed: Claude V. Ricketts
- Identification: Callsign: NDRO; Hull number: DD-955
- Namesake: Claude V. Ricketts
- Decommissioned: 31 October 1989
- Reclassified: DDG-5, 23 April 1957
- Stricken: 1 June 1990
- Honors and awards: See Awards
- Fate: Scrapped, 8 November 2002

General characteristics
- Class & type: Charles F. Adams-class destroyer
- Displacement: 3,277 tons standard, 4,526 full load
- Length: 437 ft (133 m)
- Beam: 47 ft (14 m)
- Draft: 15 ft (4.6 m)
- Propulsion: 2 × Westinghouse steam turbines providing 70,000 shp (52 MW); 2 shafts; 4 × Foster-Wheeler 1,275 psi (8,790 kPa) boilers
- Speed: 33 knots (61 km/h; 38 mph)
- Range: 4,500 nautical miles (8,300 km) at 20 knots (37 km/h)
- Complement: 354 (24 officers, 330 enlisted)
- Sensors & processing systems: AN/SPS-39 3D air search radar; AN/SPS-10 surface search radar; AN/SPG-51 missile fire control radar; AN/SPG-53 gunfire control radar; AN/SQS-23 Sonar and the hull mounted SQQ-23 Pair Sonar for DDG-2 through 19; AN/SPS-29 Air Search Radar
- Armament: 1 Mk 11 missile launcher for RIM-24 Tartar SAM system, or later the RIM-66 Standard (SM-1) and Harpoon antiship missile; 2 × 5"/54 caliber Mark 42 (127 mm) gun; 1 × RUR-5 ASROC Launcher; 6 × 12.8 in (324 mm) ASW Torpedo Tubes (2 x Mark 32 Surface Vessel Torpedo Tubes)

USS Biddle/Claude V. Ricketts (DD-955/DDG-5), was a Charles F. Adams-class guided missile destroyer of the United States Navy. She was the third US Naval ship named after Nicholas Biddle, one of the first five captains of the Continental Navy.

Originally to be designated as DD-955, the ship was laid down as DDG-5 by the New York Shipbuilding Corporation at Camden, New Jersey on 18 May 1959, launched on 4 June 1960 and commissioned as USS Biddle on 5 May 1962, at Philadelphia Naval Shipyard. Biddle was renamed to Claude V. Ricketts on 28 July 1964 in honor of Admiral Claude V. Ricketts, who had died on 6 July 1964.

== Service history ==
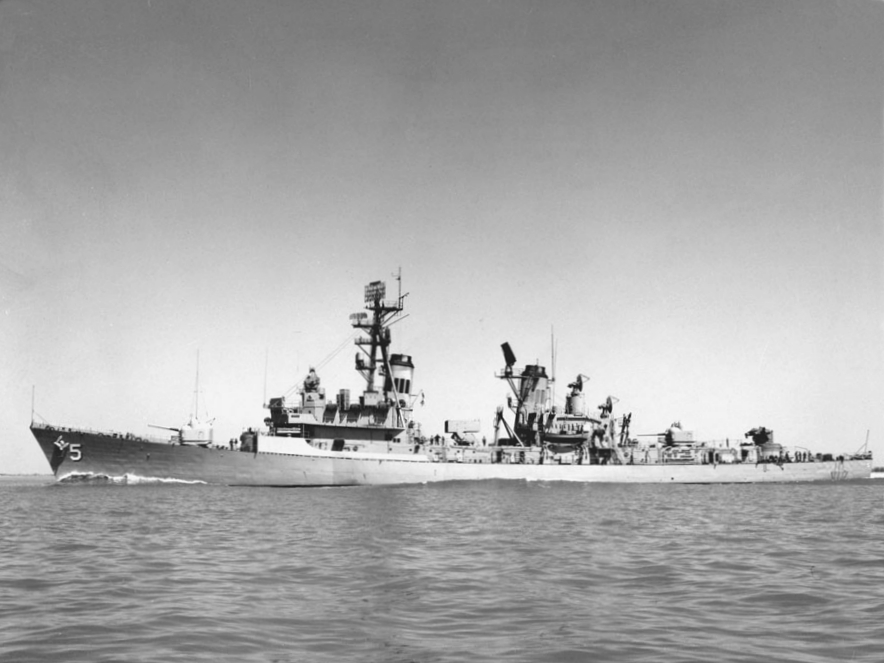
Biddle during sea trials, 1962.

=== As USS Biddle ===
Biddle operated in the Atlantic Ocean and Caribbean Sea as part of the Second Fleet until the end of 1963. Biddle participated in naval activity near Cuba in weeks before the Cuban Missile Crisis.

A Navy Expeditionary Medal was awarded for service from 19 August 1962 to 28 September 1962. Biddle made her first deployment to the Mediterranean Sea at the close of 1963 returning to Norfolk in March 1964.

=== Mixed manning experiment and the decade that followed ===
From June 1964 to end of 1965 Claude V. Ricketts was part of a mixed-manning experiment for a proposed Multilateral Force (MLF). Its crew consisted of 10 officers and 164 crew from the US Navy with the remainder filled by sailors from West Germany, Italy, Greece, the United Kingdom, the Netherlands, and Turkey. Though the MLF never was created, Secretary of the Navy Paul Nitze stated that the project on Claude V. Ricketts was successful. The ship's crest includes the NATO insignia. A Navy Unit Commendation was awarded for the 18-month period.

According to Secretary of the Navy Paul Nitze, Admiral Claude V. Ricketts had made great contributions to the concept of mixed manning and a Multilateral Force. Because of this, he thought it appropriate to rename USS Biddle in Ricketts' honor while the ship was conducting a mixed-manning experiment on 28 July 1964.

Her visit to Washington, D.C. in October 1964, was memorialized by painter, Gerard Richardson.

After the manning experiment, Claude V. Ricketts made deployments to the Mediterranean Sea from 1966 to 1973. She also made a northern European cruise in July 1972. Claude V. Ricketts deployed to the Mediterranean Sea in August 1973 and returned to Norfolk in January 1974. Shortly after her return, the ship entered the Norfolk Naval Shipyard for a ten-month overhaul returning to service in January 1975. She completed refresher training and ship trials in the Caribbean Sea from March to May 1975.

=== Belknap collision ===
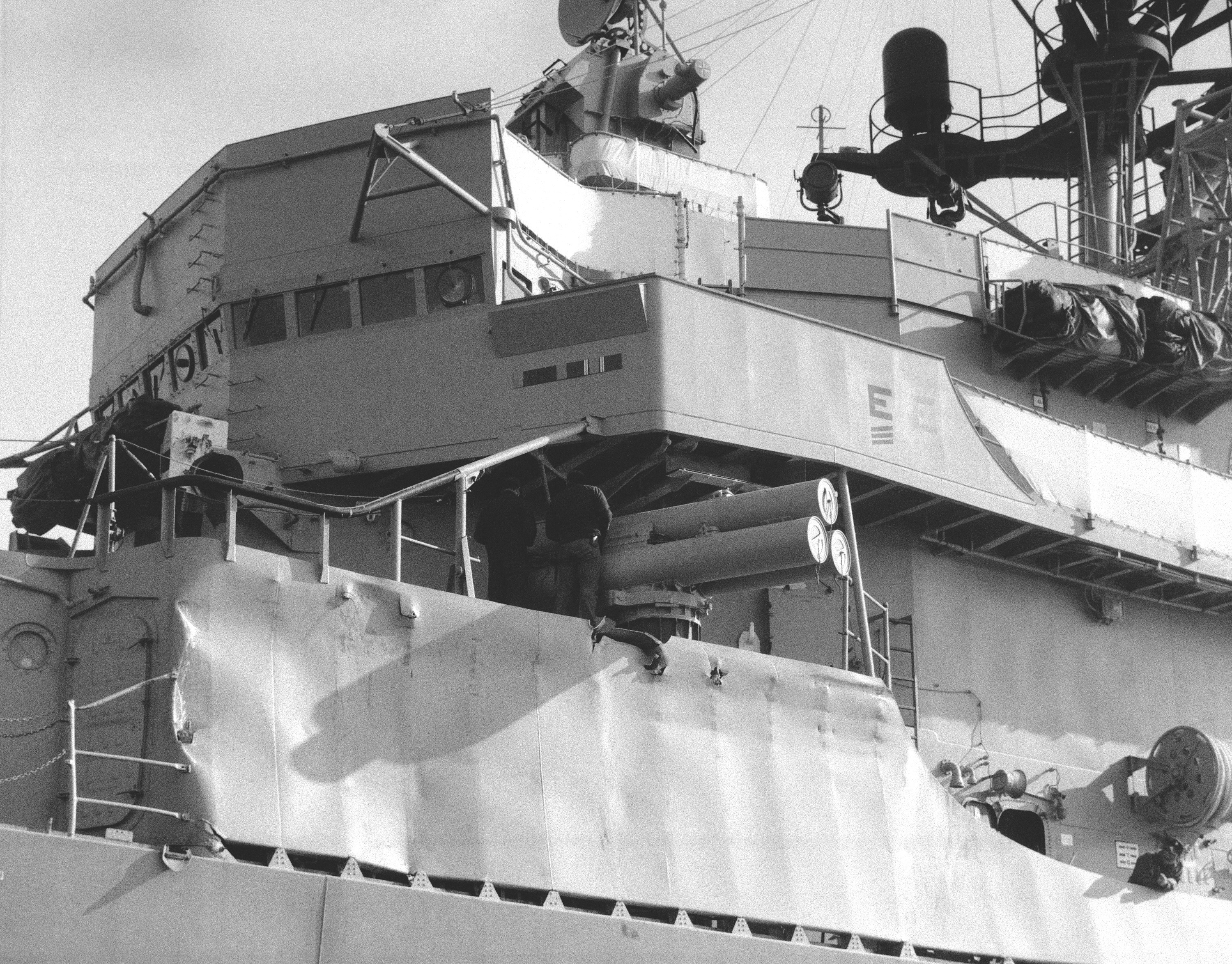
Damage received while fighting fires on Belknap.

In July 1975, Claude V. Ricketts deployed to the Mediterranean Sea. Claude V. Ricketts served as the rescue unit and tied up alongside USS Belknap (CG-26) after her collision with USS John F. Kennedy (CV-67) on the night of 22 November 1975. Belknap was ablaze with exploding ammunition from the storage lockers for her two 3-inch guns, but the crew of the Claude V. Ricketts battled the conflagration for 7 hours and limited the damage, evacuating the injured while fragments from exploding ammunition showered down upon her decks. In the end, CG-26 was knocked and melted nearly to her main deck. Seven crew members aboard Belknap and one aboard John F. Kennedy were killed. A Navy Unit Commendation was awarded for service during the time period. Claude V. Ricketts returned to Norfolk in January 1976.

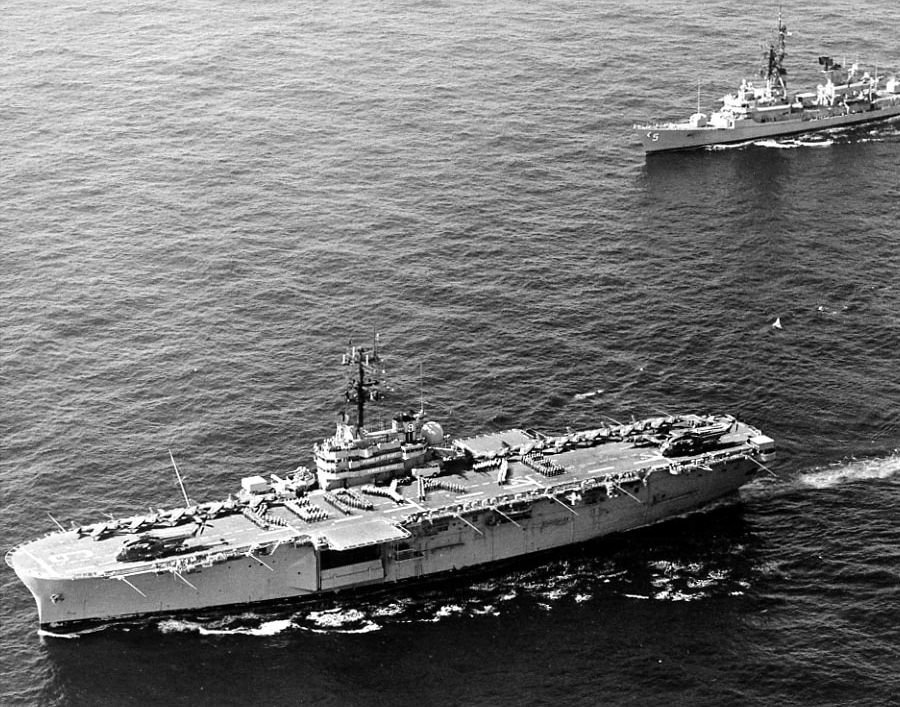
Claude V. Ricketts and USS Guam (LPH-9) visit Kenya, 1976.

On October 4, 1976, Claude V. Ricketts deployed to the Mediterranean Sea. There was also a trip to Kenya to commemorate the 13th anniversary of their independence. Just six weeks after returning to Norfolk, the ship deployed for a six-week operation with the Brazilian Navy. A Navy Expeditionary Medal was awarded for service from 1 October 1976 to 30 September 1977. From September 1977 to October 1978, Claude V. Ricketts was in the Philadelphia Naval Shipyard for an overhaul. She returned to Norfolk in April 1979 after refresher training and trials.

=== Iran Hostage Crisis ===
Claude V. Ricketts deployed for seven months to the US Middle East Force and Sixth fleet at the start of September 1979. During the first part of the cruise, the ship made ports of call to Djibouti, Kenya, and Karachi, Pakistan On 4 November 1979, Claude V. Ricketts was making a port visit to Karachi, Pakistan when radical students invaded and occupied the US Embassy in Tehran, Iran and took the embassy staff hostage initiating the Iran hostage crisis. Claude V. Ricketts was immediately tasked to proceed to the Persian Gulf area of operations to join with USS La Salle (AGF-3) and remained continuously at sea for more than 10 weeks over the Thanksgiving, Christmas and New Years Holidays.Finally after 72 days of being at sea, ended with a two-day visit in Sitra, Bahrain Claude V. Ricketts was back in the Mediterranean Sea in February 1980 and returned to Norfolk in April 1980. A Navy Expeditionary Medal was awarded for service relating to the crisis from 21 November 1979 to 2 February 1980.

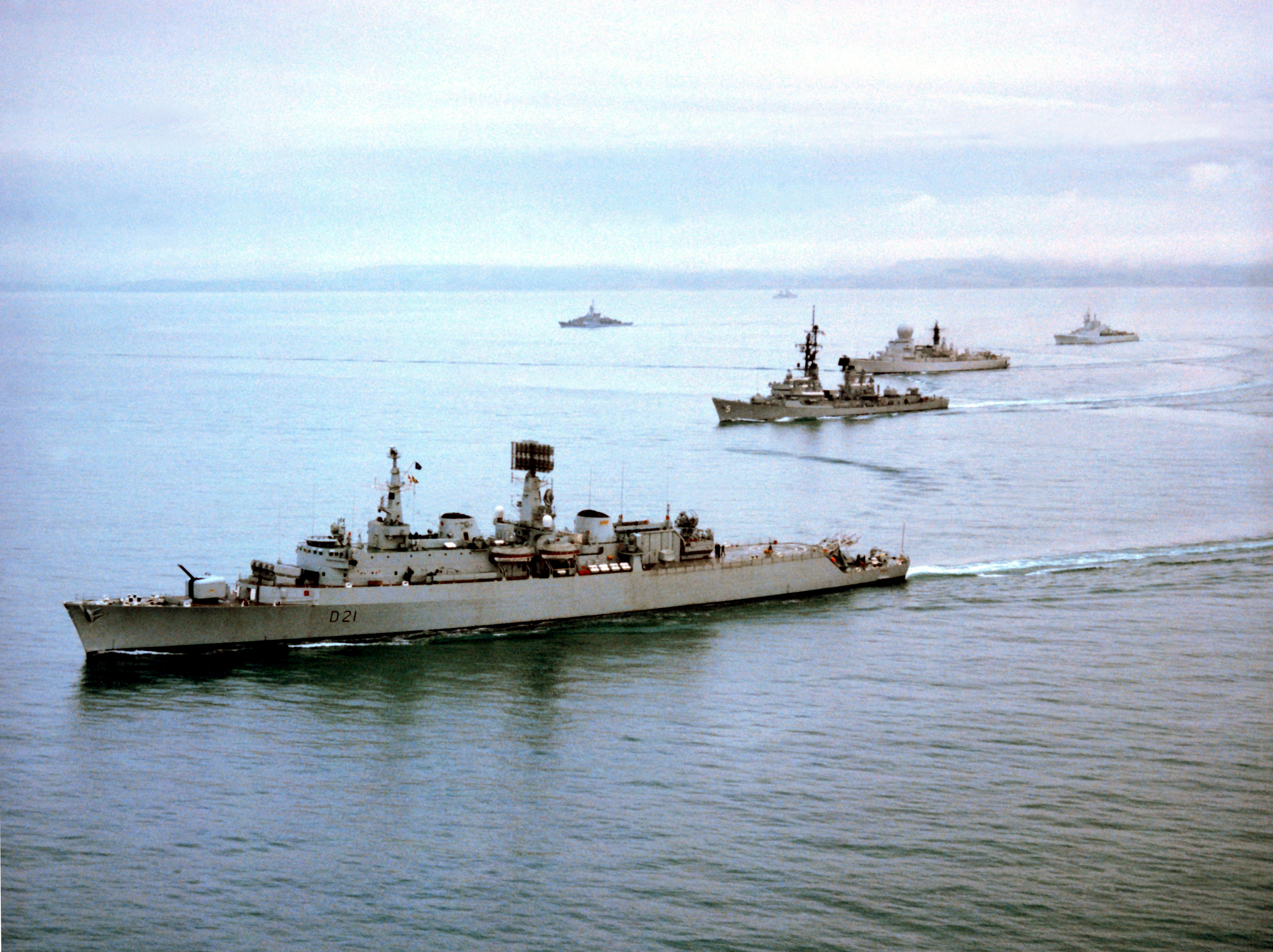
Claude V. Ricketts (second from front) operating with Standing Naval Force Atlantic, July 1982.

Claude V. Ricketts deployed to Northern Europe in January 1981 and operated with the Standing Naval Force Atlantic. The ship visited 8 countries and 15 different cities and conducted exercises from Gibraltar to Norway, north of the Arctic Circle and west to Halifax, Nova Scotia. She returned to Norfolk in June 1981. A Meritorious Unit Commendation was awarded for service from 7 January 1981 to 24 June 1981.

==== Lebanon ====
During late 1983 and early 1984, Claude V. Ricketts deployed in support of operations of the coast of Lebanon in the months after the 1983 Beirut barracks bombing. The Armed Forces Expeditionary Medal was awarded for three time periods relating to Lebanon during this deployment.

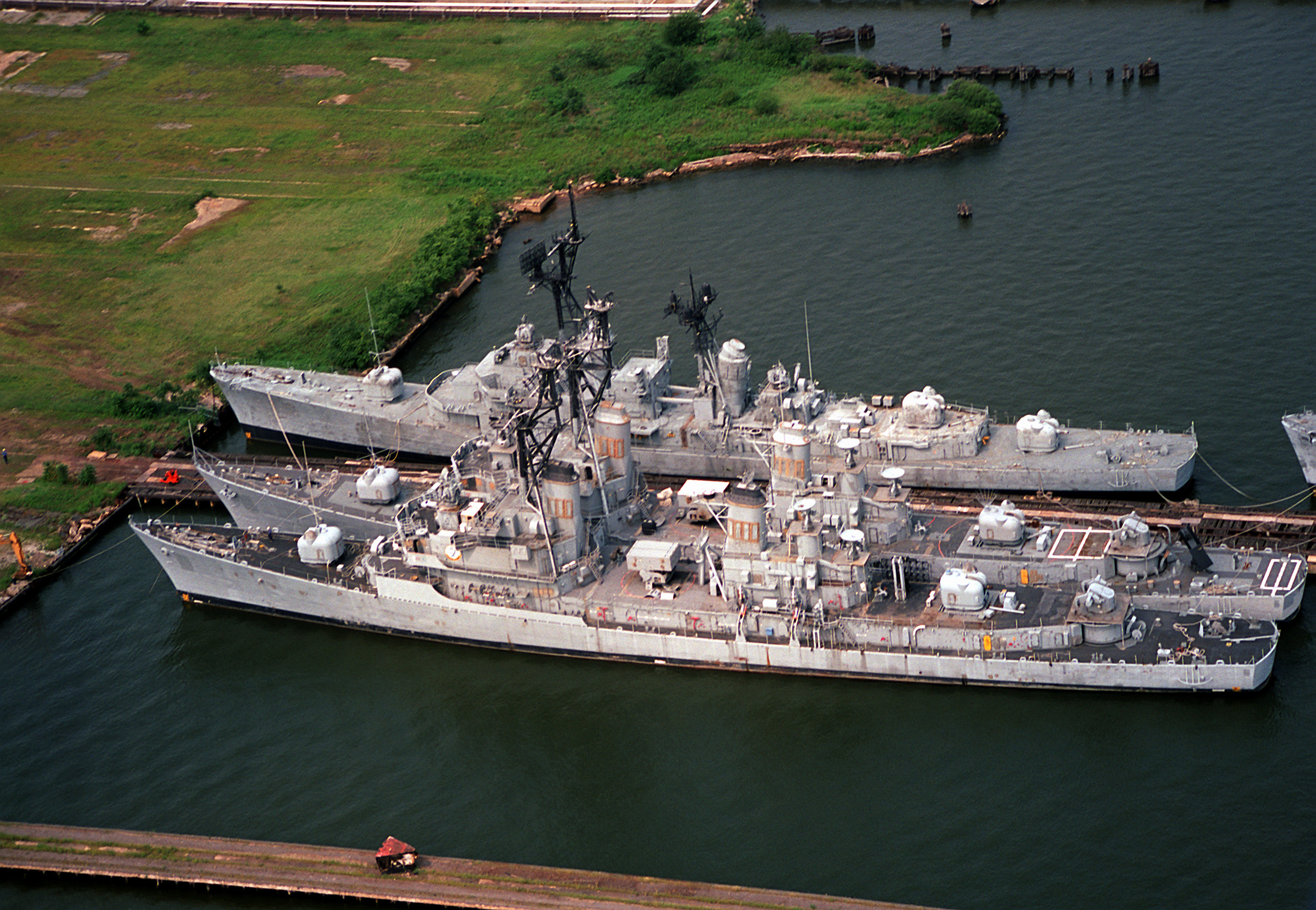
Claude V. Ricketts (front) awaits her fate at Baltimore, 1994.

Claude V. Ricketts deployed to the Mediterranean Sea in late 1987 and returned to Norfolk, 29 March 1988.

=== Decommissioning ===
Claude V. Ricketts was decommissioned on 31 October 1989 at Norfolk Naval Station, Norfolk, VA, stricken from the Naval Vessel Register on 1 June 1990 and sold for scrap on 15 April 1994, to NR Acquisitions of NYC and towed to Bethlehem Steel's old Fairfield yard in Baltimore, MD for scrapping by Wilmington Resources, Inc. of Wilmington, NC. Sale price $184,550.66. The scrap contract was terminated on 1 October 1996, and the Navy repossessed the ship on 18 October, and returned to NISMF Philadelphia and the ship was resold to Metro Machine, Incorporated, of Philadelphia Pennsylvania on 5 December 2001 . Scrapping was completed on 8 November 2002.

== Awards ==
According to the Navy Unit awards list, Claude V. Ricketts and her crew received the following awards:

- Navy Expeditionary Medal, for service from 19 August 1962 to 28 September 1962, for Cuba (3 Jan 61 – 23 Oct 62)
- Navy Unit Commendation, for service from 1 June 1964 to 1 December 1965, Mixed manning experiment
- Navy Unit Commendation, for service from 22 November 1975 to 23 November 1975, Belknap collision
- Navy Expeditionary Medal, for service from 1 October 1976 to 30 September 1977
- Navy Expeditionary Medal, for service from 21 November 1979 to 2 February 1980, relating to Iran/Indian Ocean (21 Nov 79 – 20 Oct 81)
- Meritorious Unit Commendation, for service from 7 January 1981 to 24 June 1981
- Meritorious Unit Commendation, for service from 30 July 1981 to 20 December 1981
- Armed Forces Expeditionary Medal, for service from 5 November 1983 to 13 December 1983, 4 January 1984 to 3 February 1984 and 9 February 1984 to 28 February 1984, relating to Lebanon (1 Jun 83 – 1 Aug 84)
- Coast Guard Special Operations Service Ribbon, for service from 1 July 1987 to 30 September 1987

== See also ==
For other ships named Biddle, see USS Biddle. As of 2015, there have been no other ships named for Claude V. Ricketts.
