= Claude V. Ricketts =

United States Navy admiral

Claude Vernon Ricketts
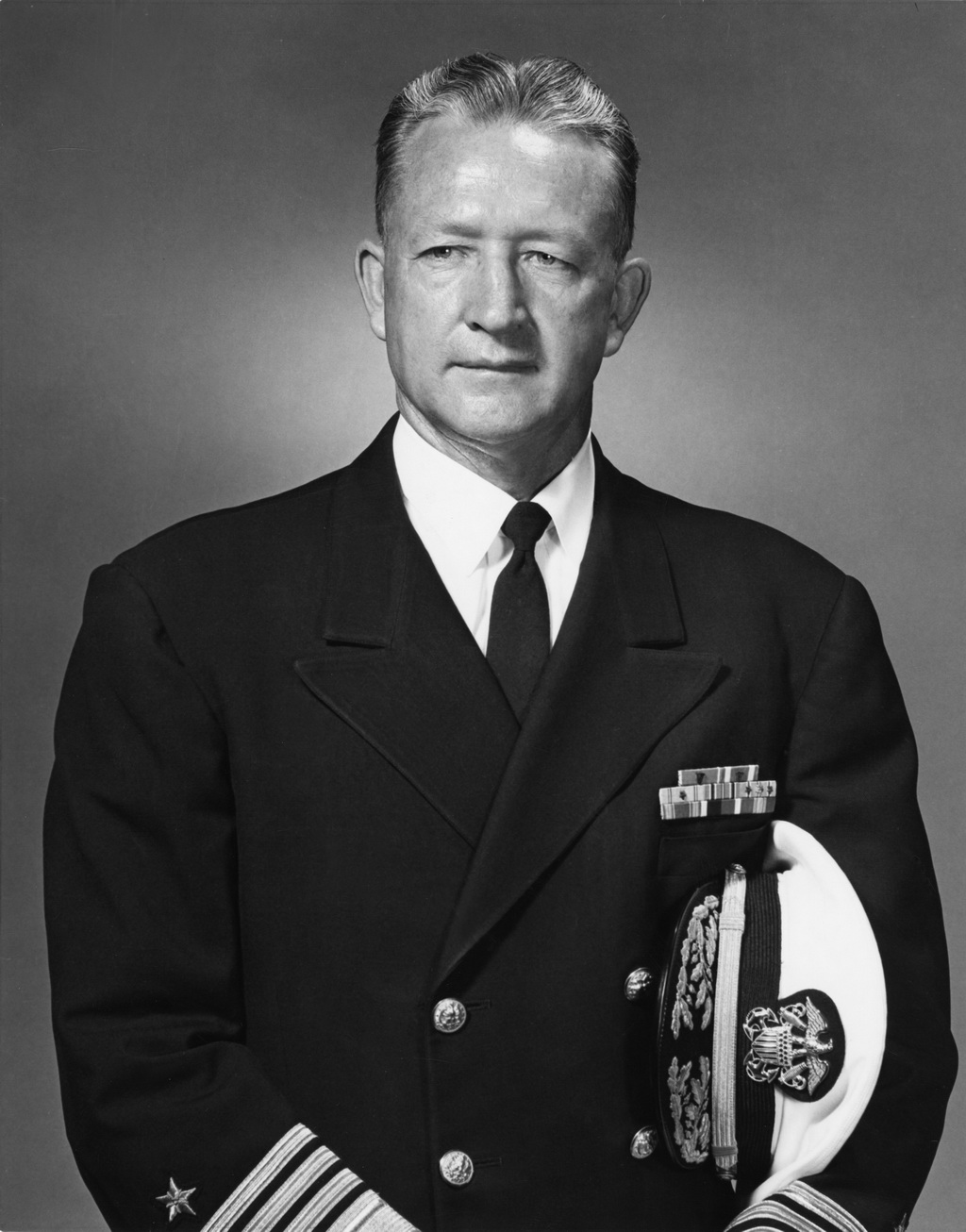
- Born: February 23, 1906; Missouri, US
- Died: July 6, 1964 (aged 58)
- Relatives: RADM Myron Ricketts (son)
- Military career
- Branch: United States Navy
- Service years: 1929–1964
- Rank: Admiral
- Commands: Vice Chief of Naval Operations
- Conflicts: World War II: Attack on Pearl Harbor; Cold War
- Awards: Distinguished Service Medal; Legion of Merit; Navy Commendation Medal

Claude Vernon Ricketts (February 23, 1906 – July 6, 1964) was a four-star admiral in the United States Navy, who served as the Vice Chief of Naval Operations from 1961 to 1964.

== Biography ==
Ricketts graduated from high school in Kansas in 1922. He enlisted in the Navy, attended the United States Naval Academy, and became an officer upon his graduation in 1929. He was captain of the boxing team for two years at Annapolis. As a lieutenant, he was the gunnery officer on board the USS West Virginia (BB-48) during the attack on Pearl Harbor. In addition to his duties with the anti-aircraft battery, he helped attend dying captain Mervyn Bennion, with the aid of Doris Miller; assisted in counter-flooding the ship after it heeled over from six torpedoes and two bombs; and assisted in fire fighting. He was awarded with the Legion of Merit and the Navy Commendation Medal for his service in World War II.

Ricketts commanded USS Saint Paul (CA-73) during 1955. In July 1952 he became head of the Amphibious Warfare Branch in the Office of the Chief of Naval Operations under command of Admiral William Fechteler. He later became commander of the Second Fleet and then assumed duties as the Vice Chief of Naval Operations in September 1961. He succeeded admiral James Sargent Russell in this capacity.

Admiral Claude Vernon Ricketts died of a massive heart attack on July 6, 1964, while still in office. He was posthumously awarded the Navy Distinguished Service Medal for his service as Vice Chief of Naval Operations. After his death, the destroyer USS Biddle was renamed USS Claude V. Ricketts (DDG-5) in his honor, as was Ricketts Hall at the Naval Academy.

Claude's son Rear Admiral Myron Ricketts, USN Ret., designed and engineered many ships.

== Decorations ==
Here is the ribbon bar of Admiral Claude V. Ricketts:

Naval Aviator Badge
1st Row	Navy Distinguished Service Medal	Legion of Merit with "V" Device	Navy Commendation Medal with "V" Device
2nd Row	American Defense Service Medal with Fleet Clasp	American Campaign Medal	Asiatic-Pacific Campaign Medal with seven Service stars
3rd Row	World War II Victory Medal	Navy Occupation Service Medal	National Defense Service Medal with one service star

== See also ==
Military offices
Preceded by James S. Russell	Vice Chief of Naval Operations; 1961–1964	Succeeded by Horacio Rivero, Jr.
