= Patrol torpedo boat PT-346 =

Torpedo boat of the United States Navy

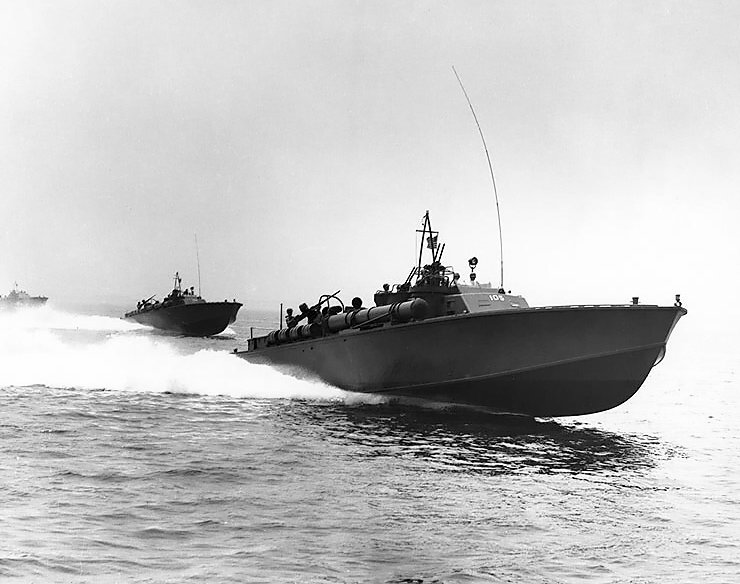
- PT-105, an 80' Elco boat similar to PT-346

History

United States
- Name: PT-346
- Builder: Electric Launch Company (Elco), Bayonne, New Jersey USA
- Laid down: 13 March 1943
- Launched: 21 May 1943
- Commissioned: 10 June 1943
- Fate: Destroyed by friendly fire, 29 April 1944

General characteristics
- Displacement: 51 BRT
- Length: 80 ft
- Beam: 23 ft
- Draft: 5 ft
- Propulsion: 3 engines, 3 propellers
- Speed: 43 knots
- Complement: 11 men
- Armament: 2x20mm guns; 4 Machine guns; 4x21" torpedo tubes

PT-346 was an 80 ft Electric Launch Company (Elco) motor torpedo boat which suffered the worst PT-boat friendly-fire casualties of World War II, with nine men killed and nine wounded by airstrike.

== The incident ==
The majority of all friendly fire PT boat casualties during World War II occurred in the Southwest Pacific in two separate incidents occurring over the span of one month- the first on 27 March 1944, and the second on 29 April 1944. PT-346, skippered by Lieutenant James Burk, USNR, was the rescue vessel in March and the victim in April. PT boat Squadron 25 took the brunt of both incidents, which resulted in 22 men killed, including Burk, and 28 wounded.

On 27 March 1944, PT-346 and PT-354 rescued the survivors of PT-353 and PT-121, which had been mistakenly destroyed during a mission off the coast of New Britain by five fighter planes under the command of the Royal Australian Air Force.

Just over a month later, PT-346 itself became the victim of friendly fire. The morning of 29 April 1944, PT-346 was sent to the aid of PT-347, commanded by Lieutenant Robert J. Williams, USNR, and PT-350, skippered by Stanley L. Manning, USNR. PT-347 had become stuck on a reef during a night patrol to intercept enemy barges and destroy shore installations off the coast of Rabaul in Lassul Bay, located off the northwest corner of New Britain Island in New Guinea. (The waters of the Pacific were not well charted and during World War II, more PT boats were lost to reefs than to enemy fire.)

At 0700, PT-350 was attempting to dislodge PT-347 from the reef, when two American Marine Corsair planes mistook the PT boats for Japanese gunboats and attacked. Taking heavy fire from the planes, PT-350 shot down one of the two attacking fighters, believing them to be A6M Zeros. With three dead and four wounded and serious mechanical problems, PT-350 headed back to base. PT-347 remained stuck on the reef. Lieutenant Burk headed out with his crew and the base commander of the 25th Squadron, Lieutenant James R. Thompson, USNR, and Chief Pharmacist First Class John Frkovich, USNR, to render medical aid. When PT-350 could not be boarded because of extensive damage, PT-346 headed out to PT-347 to provide assistance. PT-346 arrived at 1230, and at 1400 was still attempting to dislodge PT-347 from the coral heads when planes appeared. The Corsair plane from the morning run brought back an entire squadron of 21 aircraft (four Corsairs, six Grumman TBF Avenger torpedo bombers, four Grumman F6F Hellcat fighters, and eight Douglas SBD Dauntless dive bombers). Recognizing the planes as American and thinking they were the air cover he had ordered, the squadron commander ordered the men to keep working; however, the planes attacked the two boats, still mistaking them for Japanese gunboats. PT-346 did not respond defensively until it was too late, and took heavy casualties. The skipper of PT-347, Lieutenant Williams, who had experienced the earlier attack, ordered his men into the water and to stay dispersed, but two men were killed and three wounded. PT-346 and PT-347 were completely destroyed by bombs, and the men were strafed in the water for approximately one hour, continuing to dive under the water to survive as the planes approached.

Wilbur Larsen, USNR, motor machinist's mate third class of PT-347, received the Navy Marine Corps medal for saving wounded non-swimmer Forrest May's life, and Lieutenant James Burk received the Purple Heart. Mortally wounded, Burk ordered medic John Frkovich to take his life jacket so he could survive and treat the wounded.

== Causes and inquiry ==
Factors that contributed to the incident included an influx of new pilots who lacked experience in recognizing PT boats, poor communications between the planes and PT boats, and the fact that the incident occurred in an area of the Pacific which was the "line of demarcation" between Nimitz and MacArthur's Pacific commands, which meant that coordination of reports between the two commands did not always occur. A formal inquiry into the incident was conducted and improvements instituted as a result of the tragedy.
