= Gerard Richardson =

American painter (1910–1971)

Gerard Richardson (1910–1971) was an American painter and designer. He was born in New York City. Richardson has been recognized as an important naval artist of the twentieth century. He was married to Alicia Richardson. They had no children, however Richardson had a son, Gerard W Richardson, II (aka Gerard Arthur 1929-2013) with his first wife, Ridie LeClair Richardson.

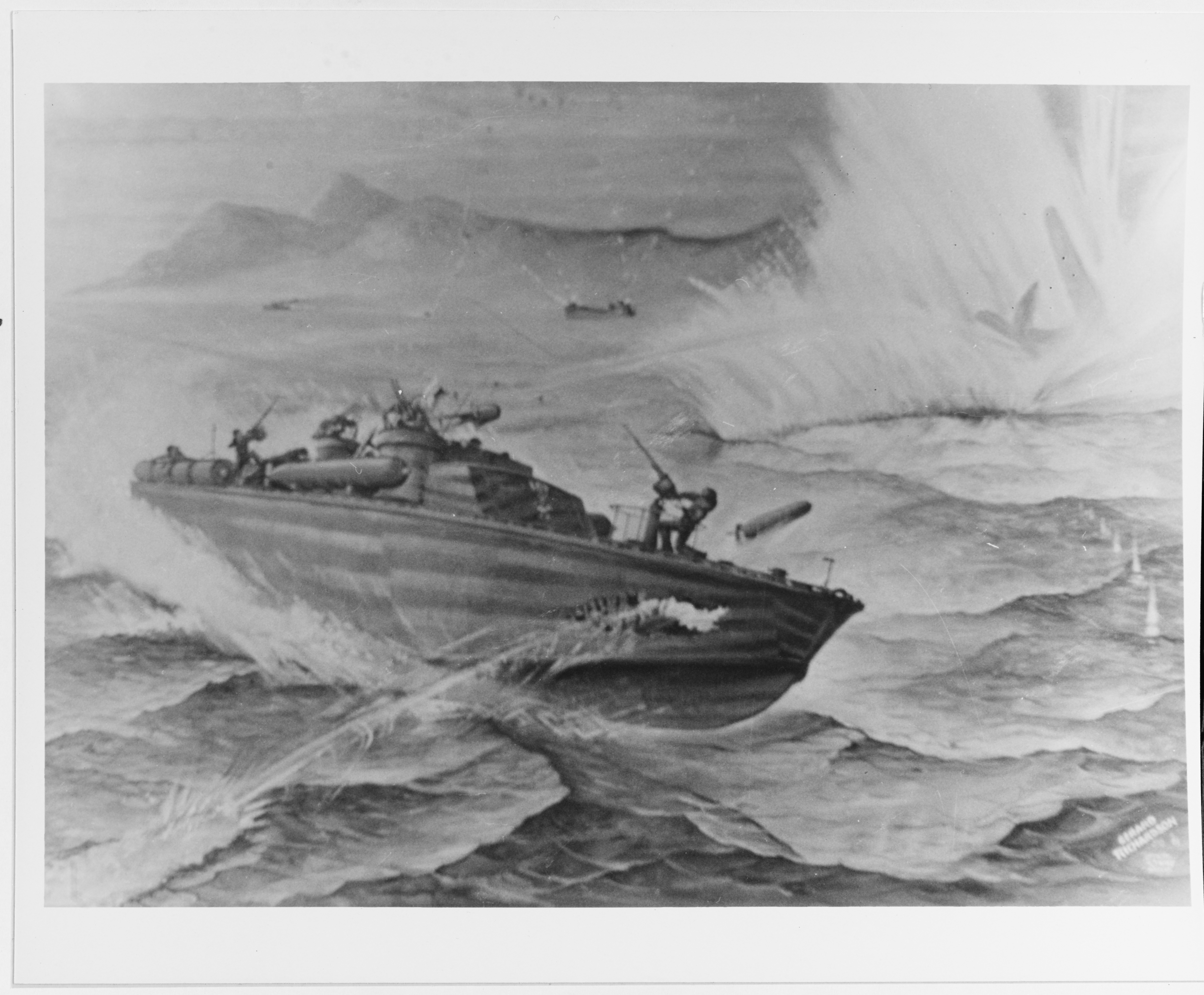
NH 64787-KN USS PT-167 by Gerard Richardson

== Career ==
Richardson was a Commander, later Captain, in the US Navy during World War II. He mostly did original paintings on a commission basis. There are few signed prints ever authorized by him, but as the official U S Navy Artist during World War II he did thousands of unsigned prints of naval ships during World War II for the sailors who served aboard them. The originals of these ships reside in the U S Navy Museum. Richardson did several large murals in the Washington D.C. area where he and his wife lived after World War II.

He generally signed his oil paintings in upper case letters "GERARD RICHARDSON", usually in red, on the lower right hand corner with a year date.

=== Heavenly Mist ===
His painting, Heavenly Mist, is a rendering of the sinking of John F. Kennedy's PT Boat 109 by the Japanese Destroyer, Amagiri. The painting was commissioned by George E. Lowe in the summer of 1960. The painting was featured in Robert J. Donovan's book, PT-109, John F. Kennedy in World War II. The painting was a favorite of the President's and remained in the White House until the Johnson Administration.

As of 2016 the work is in the John F. Kennedy Presidential Library.

== Collections ==
The Syracuse University Library has a special collection of his papers and copies of some of his art works. Many of his paintings of ships and naval battles reside in the U.S. Navy Museum. Other works in Public Collections are in the French Naval Club, Paris, France; National Naval Memorial Museum, Washington, DC; Admiral Jerauld Wright Building, Washington DC; Norfolk Naval Base, Norfolk, VA; Lyndon B. Johnson Ranch, Texas; Sam Rayburn Library, Texas; In the 1960s, he did the covers for many of the Motor Boating Magazine, a Hearst publication. The originals hang in the Hearst Building in New York City.
