= Patrol torpedo boat PT-105 =

Torpedo boat of the United States Navy

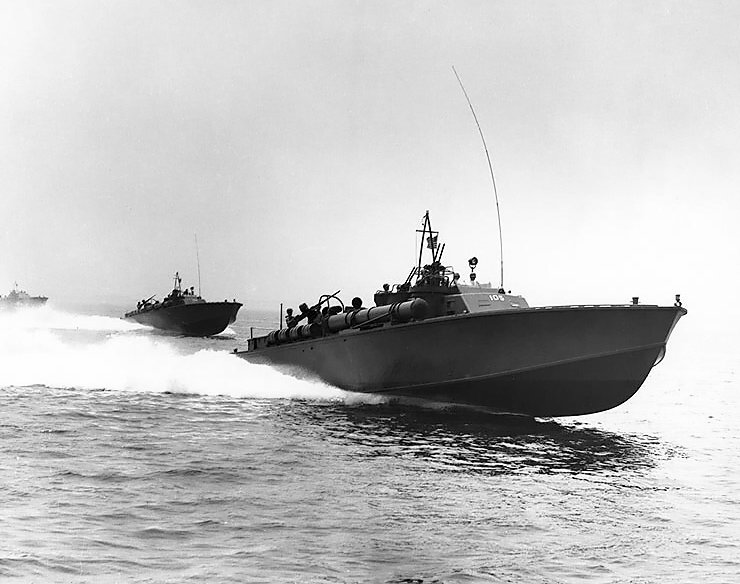
- USS PT-105

History
- Name: PT-105
- Builder: Elco Motor Yachts, Bayonne, New Jersey
- Laid down: 5 February 1942
- Launched: 4 June 1942
- Completed: 26 June 1942
- Commissioned: June 1942
- Decommissioned: November 1945
- Fate: Scrapped, 1945

General characteristics
- Type: PT boat
- Displacement: 56 long tons (57 t) (full load)
- Length: 80 ft (24 m) (overall)
- Beam: 20 ft 8 in (6.30 m)
- Draft: 3 ft 6 in (1.07 m) maximum (aft)
- Propulsion: 3 × 1,500 hp (1,119 kW) 12-cylinder Packard gasoline engines; 3 shafts
- Speed: 41 knots (76 km/h; 47 mph) maximum (trials)
- Endurance: 12 hours, 6 hours at top speed
- Complement: 3 officers, 14 enlisted men
- Armament: 4 × 21 in (533 mm) torpedo tubes; 4 × Mark 8 torpedoes; 1 × 37 mm (1.5 in) M4 cannon mounted forward; 1 × Oerlikon 20 mm (0.79 in) cannon aft; 2 × twin M2 Browning .5 in (13 mm) machine guns
- Armor: Deck house fitted with armor plate to protect against rifle bullets and splinters

PT-105 was a PT boat of the United States Navy during World War II. The 80-foot (24 m) motor torpedo boat was built by the Elco Motor Yacht Company of Bayonne, New Jersey, in early 1942, and served until the end of the war.

== Service history ==
PT-105 was commissioned in June 1942, as part of Motor Torpedo Boat Squadron 5, under the command of Cdr. Henry Farrow. From September 1942 until early in 1943 she served on the Panama Sea Frontier, when she was transferred to the Solomon Islands. PT-105, under the command of Lt. Richard E. Keresey, was present during the action with Japanese destroyers in the Blackett Strait on the night of 1–2 August 1943, in the aftermath of which PT-109 (commanded by Lieutenant (junior grade) John F. Kennedy, future US president) was sunk. On the 22nd of that month, PT-105 participated in a daylight raid on the Kolombangara coast that provoked a considerable fight between PT boats and enemy coastal guns. At the end of 1944 MTB Squadron 5 was disbanded and its remaining boats distributed to other squadrons.

On 15 February 1945 PT-105 was transferred to MTB Squadron 18, under the command of Lt. Edward Macauley III, and saw action in New Guinea; at Manus Island in the Admiralties; and at Morotai in the Halmaheras. She was also based for a time at Kana Kopa, New Guinea, and in San Pedro Bay, Philippines, but saw no action there.

25 March 1945 a USO show was in Morotai and one of the performers was dancer Betsy Seligman (aka Betsy Berkely) - during the show she recognized among the servicemen her high school classmate from Seguin, TX, Lt (jg) Clarence Saegert, then the skipper of the PT 105. The crew took Betsy on a fast tour of the harbor and made her an honorary member of the crew, complete with a certificate signed by all the crew. PT 105 became known among the squadron as the USS 'Betsy'.

The vessel was placed out of service on 1 November 1945, and later stripped and scrapped at Samar, Philippines.
