= Robert J. Donovan =

American journalist and historian

Robert John Donovan (August 21, 1912 – August 8, 2003) was an American correspondent, author, and presidential historian.

== Biography ==
Donovan attended Lafayette High School in Buffalo, New York, where he was captain of the Hocke Herald Tribune after the war and served as a foreign correspondent and Washington, D.C., bureau chief. During the latter period he was president of the White House Correspondents' Association. From the Tribune, he moved to the Los Angeles Times as Washington bureau chief and for a short time as associate editor in Los Angeles.

Donovan began writing books on the Washington political scene while still a reporter and continued that after retirement. He also served a year as a Woodrow Wilson Fellow and a year as a visiting professor at Princeton University. He liked to joke that he was the only professor at Princeton never to have attended a single day of college in his life. In 1984, on the occasion of the 100th anniversary of the birth of Harry S. Truman, Donovan addressed a Joint Session of Congress as Truman's principal biographer. At the time, he was the only active journalist to have ever had that distinction.

Donovan's works include The Assassins (1955), Eisenhower: The Inside Story (1956), PT-109: John F. Kennedy in World War II (1961), Six Days in June. Israel's Fight for Survival (1967), The Future of the Republican Party (1976), Conflict and Crisis: The Presidency of Harry S. Truman, 1945-48 (1977), Tumultuous Years: The Presidency of Harry S. Truman, 1949-53 (1982), Nemesis: Truman and Johnson in the Coils of War in Asia (1984), The Second Victory: The Marshall Plan and the Postwar Revival of Europe (1987), Confidential Secretary: Ann Whitman's Twenty Years with Eisenhower and Rockefeller (1988), Unsilent Revolution: Television News and American Public Life, 1948-1991 (1992, with Ray Scherer), and Boxing the Kangaroo: A Reporter's Memoir (2000).

Donovan died in 2003 from complications from a stroke.
