= PT 109 (disambiguation) =

PT-109 may refer to:

- Patrol torpedo boat PT-109, the boat commanded by John F. Kennedy during World War II

== Books ==
- PT 109: An American Epic of War, Survival, and the Destiny of John F. Kennedy a 2015 book about the sinking of the boat and resulting events
- PT 109: John F. Kennedy in World War II, a 1961 book by Robert J. Donovan
- John F. Kennedy and PT-109, a 1962 book by Richard Tregaskis
- Collision With History: The Search for John F. Kennedy's PT 109, a 2002 book by Robert Ballard

== Other ==
- PT 109 (film), a 1963 film about John F. Kennedy's service commanding PT 109 based on the 1961 book by Robert J. Donovan
- The Search for Kennedy's PT 109, a television documentary made in conjunction with Robert Ballard's 2002 book
- "PT-109" (song), a 1962 song by Jimmy Dean about the sinking of the boat
- PT-109 (video game), a 1987 torpedo boat simulator
- PT-109 (comics), a 1964 comic book
