= PT 109: An American Epic of War, Survival, and the Destiny of John F. Kennedy =

2015 non-fiction book on the PT-109 by William Doyle

- First edition cover
- Author: William Doyle
- Illustrator: Photos courtesy of the US Navy, and the John F. Kennedy Presidential Library and Museum
- Cover artist: Jacket Design by Adam Johnson
- Language: English
- Subject: John Kennedy's shipwreck on PT-109 and its effect on his political career
- Genre: Nonfiction
- Publisher: William Morrow, imprint of Harper-Collins
- Publication date: 2015
- Publication place: New York, USA
- Media type: Print (hardback)
- Pages: 330 (With index)

PT 109: An American Epic of War, Survival, and the Destiny of John F. Kennedy is a non-fiction book by best-selling author William Doyle released by Harper-Collins in 2015 that describes the ramming and sinking of future President John F. Kennedy's Patrol Torpedo Boat 109 by the Japanese destroyer Amagiri off the coast of Kolombangara Island in the Solomon Island Chain on August 2, 1943. The book also chronicles the crew's difficult three mile swim to Plum Pudding Island and the subsequent week of living there and on adjacent Olasana Island until Patrol Torpedo Boat PT-157 rescued them on August 8. The book also discusses the considerable impact the experience had in helping to launch Kennedy's political career, beginning with his election to the House of Representatives in 1946. JFK's aid David Powers has written, "without PT 109, there never would have been a President John F. Kennedy".

== Crew on PT-109's last mission ==
The following men were aboard on PT-109's last mission:

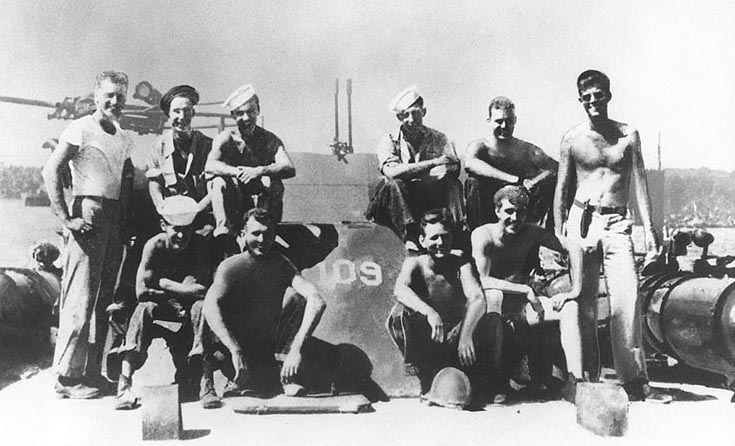
Top L to R, Ensign Al Webb, Leon Drawdy, Edger Mauer, Edmund Drewitch, John Maguire, Kennedy. Bottom L to R, Charles Harris, Maurice Kowal, Andrew Kirksey, Ensign Lenny Thom. (Webb, Drewitch, Drawdy, and Kowal not aboard during collision, Barney Ross not in photo), 1943

- John F. Kennedy, Lieutenant, Junior Grade (LTJG), commanding officer (Boston, Massachusetts).
- Leonard J. Thom, ensign (ENS), Ohio State football athlete, and excellent swimmer, executive officer (Sandusky, Ohio).
- George H. R. "Barney" Ross, Ensign (ENS) On board as an observer after losing his own boat. Attempted to operate the 37 mm gun but suffered from night blindness. (Highland Park, Illinois).
- Raymond Albert, Seaman 2/c, gunner. Killed in action 8 October 1943 (Akron, Ohio).
- Charles A. "Bucky" Harris, gunner's mate 3/c (GM3) (Watertown, Massachusetts).
- William Johnston, Motor Machinist's Mate 2/c (MM2) (Dorchester, Massachusetts).
- Andrew Jackson Kirksey, Torpedoman's Mate 2/c (TM2) Killed in collision. (Reynolds, Georgia).
- John E. Maguire, Radioman 2/c (RM2) (Dobbs Ferry, New York).
- Harold William Marney, Motor Machinist's Mate 2/c (MM2). Killed in collision, manning turret closest to impact point. (Springfield, Massachusetts)
- Edman Edgar Mauer, Quartermaster, cook, 3/c (QM3) (St. Louis, Missouri).
- Patrick H. "Pappy" McMahon, Motor Machinist's Mate 1/c (MM1) (Wyanet, Illinois). Only man in engine room during collision, was badly burned, but recovered from his wounds. Only member of the crew besides Kennedy mentioned by name in the popular 1960's PT-109 song.
- Ray L. Starkey, Torpedoman's Mate 2/c (TM2) (Garden Grove, California).
- Gerard E. Zinser, Motor Machinist's Mate 1/c (MM1) (Belleville, Illinois). Erroneously called "Gerald" in many publications, Zinser remained in the Navy for a career following the end of World War II, eventually retiring as a Chief Petty Officer. The last living survivor of PT-109, he died in Florida in 2001.

== Content ==
=== Shipwrecked August 2 ===
Off the coast of the round volcanic island, Kolombangara in the Solomons in the early morning hours of August 2, 1943, the Japanese destroyer Amagiri cut through John F. Kennedy's Motor Torpedo Boat 109, creating a 100 foot high ball of flame, and instantly killing two deckhands, nineteen year old William Marney, and twenty-five-year-old father, Andrew Kirksey.

=== Swims to Ferguson Passage, Olasana and Naru Islands ===
Plum Pudding, Olasana, and Naru Islands

After the collision, Kennedy and Ensign Thom gathered the crew by the sinking bow of PT-109 and later completed a 3.5 mile swim to Plum Pudding Island with Kennedy towing badly burned crewman Patrick McMahon. After resting, Kennedy swam 2 miles (3.2 km) on August 2, to Ferguson Passage to attempt to hail a passing American PT boat, though none appeared that night. On 4 August, he and Ensign Lenny Thom assisted his injured and hungry crew on a demanding swim 3.75 miles (6.04 km) south to Olasana Island which was visible to all from Plum Pudding Island. They swam against a strong current, and once again, Kennedy towed McMahon by his life vest. They were pleased to discover Olasana had ripe coconuts, though there was still no fresh water.

On the following day, 5 August, Kennedy and George Ross swam for one hour to Naru Island, visible at an additional distance of about .5 miles (0.80 km) southeast from Olasana, in search of help and food and because it was closer to Ferguson Passage where Kennedy might see or swim to a passing PT boat on patrol. Kennedy and Ross discovered a small canoe, packages of crackers and candy, and a fifty-gallon drum of potable water left by the Japanese, and Kennedy paddled both back to Olasana in the acquired canoe to provide his crew. It was then that Kennedy first spoke to native Melanesian coastwatchers Biuku Gasa and Eroni Kumana on Olasana Island.

Fearing the castaways were Japanese, but finally realizing they were with Americans, the coastwatchers brought a few yams, vegetables, and cigarettes from their dugout canoe and vowed to help the starving crew. But it would take two more days for a full rescue.

=== Messages received by Coastwatchers Kevu and Evans ===
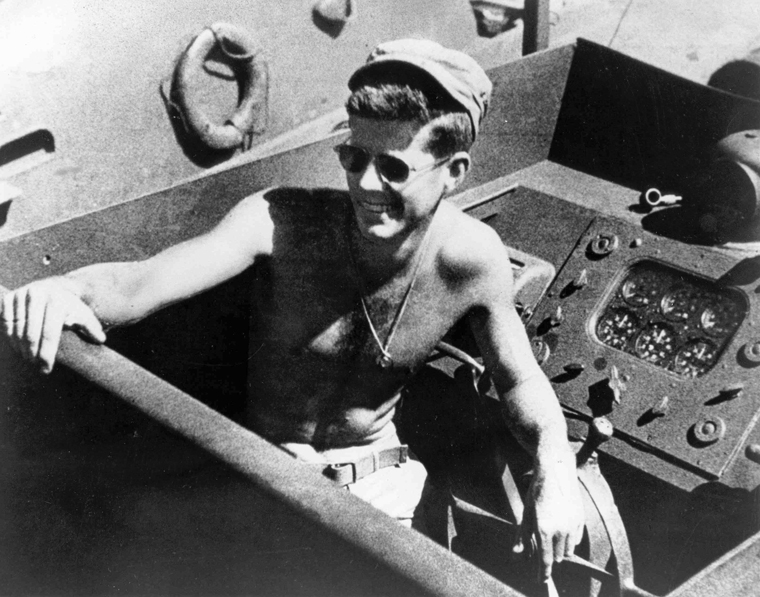
Kennedy at helm of PT-109

On 6 August, native coastwatchers Biaku Gasa and Eroni Kumana left Olasana and headed east, carrying a penciled note written by Ensign Lenny Thom describing the approximate location and number of the shipwrecked crew, and Kennedy's message written on a coconut with the same content, ten nautical miles (12 mi; 19 km) to Wana Wana Island, south of Kolombangara and 1/4 of the way to Kennedy's PT Naval base on Rendova Island. There they took little time to rest but linked up with Senior Scout Benjamin Kevu who they told they had found the crew of the 109. Ben Kevu sent another scout to inform Australian officer and Coastwatcher Reginald Evans, north on Kolombangara Island, of the discovery. Gasa and Kumana departed Wana Wana with scout John Kari in a better canoe given them by Kevu, carrying both Thom's and Kennedy's messages to a military outpost on Roviana Island, close to the PT Rendova base in a total of fifteen hours by paddling their canoe all night through 38 mi (61 km) of rough seas, and hostile waters patrolled by the Japanese. From the content of the messages, it is clear both Thom and Kennedy trusted the coastwatchers with their lives, as neither message contained the exact coordinates of their location, nor the name of Olasana Island. Traveling in an arranged boat, Gasa and Kumana were at last sent south to the PT base at Rendova from Roviana Island, a distance of only 3 miles (4.8 km) from the Rendova PT base, with Gasa still clutching the coconut.

Around 6 August, after speaking to Kevu about the eleven found on Olasana, Evans sent a canoe with fresh fish, yams, potatoes, corned beef hash, and rice to Kennedy and his crew with a message to return to him on Kolumbangara's Gomu Island in the canoe immediately. Kennedy was instructed to lie underneath palm fronds in the canoe so he would not be spotted by Japanese planes. In total, Kennedy swam an impressive total distance of around 8 miles and paddled a canoe around 2, searching for food, or water for his crew, or hoping to hail a passing PT boat. It was not until the morning of 7 August, that Evans was able to radio Rendova to confirm the news that Kennedy and his crew had been discovered.

=== Rescue ===
Finally on August 8, Commander Thomas Warfield at the PT Base on Rendova Island sent Bud Liebenow's PT-157 to rescue the stranded crew of the PT-109 from Olasana Island, and return them to the PT Base. The rescue party included the full crew of the PT-157 including her skipper Bud Libenow, two additional PT officers, three coastwatchers, including natives Eroni and Gasa, two Pharmacist's mates to provide medical care, and two reporters.

== Critical reviews ==
The online website Bookreporter gives an excellent rating to the book and considers it "a thrilling and definitive account of the sinking of PT 109 and its shipwrecked crew's heroics". The review attributes the book's value and authenticity to best selling author William Doyle's "original interviews with the last living links to the events, previously untapped Japanese wartime archives, and a wealth of archival documents from the Kennedy Library, including a lost first-hand account by JFK himself". The novel's real strength is its exceptional readability, which is enhanced and never hampered by its level of detail. Previous authors attempting to portray the PT-109 adventure lacked a comparable level of detail, and historical accuracy, and were unable to plumb the depth of emotions of the central characters as accurately as Doyle.

Incorporating an interview with Doyle, Randy Dotinga's review in the Christian Science Monitor described the importance the PT-109 saga had on Kennedy's future career. Dotinga noted that "The heroic saga of PT 109 – which was immortalized in a classic 1944 New Yorker article by John Hersey... relentlessly distributed by the Kennedy campaigns – perfectly insulated Kennedy from charges of being an undistinguished playboy politician by transfiguring him into a mythic action-war-hero." Dotinga also described the important role the PT-109 story played in Kennedy's Presidential primary victories further noting that "in the May 1960 Democratic presidential primary in West Virginia when it looked like Hubert Humphrey might force JFK out of the race, the Kennedy campaign "Swift Boated" Humphrey by falsely implying he was a draft dodger, using the PT 109 story as the coup de grace that forced Humphrey to quit the race in disgust and despair. That cleared the way for Kennedy to seize the Democratic nomination."

James Endrst of the USA Today Journal News, noted that JFK's father was largely responsible for launching JFK into political prominence using the PT-109 saga. He wrote "For Joseph P. Kennedy Sr., it was the break he had been looking for and the story became the vessel that would launch JFK into political prominence (after the death of eldest son Joseph P. Kennedy Jr. on a flying mission in 1944). It would empower the family dynasty, and eventually lead to the oval office." Joseph Kennedy used his knowledge of public relations, and his contacts in the media to get William Hershey's story of the PT-109 saga into American media including the widely read Reader's Digest.

Author David Resins wrote a positive review, emphasizing the added detail and new research in the new novel. He noted, "The hallmark of a terrific history is when you think you know the story and discover that there's so much more. William Doyle's PT 109 infuses an iconic tale with new information and insights, and in the telling deepens our understanding of the young John F. Kennedy's courageous 'origin' story".

Author Douglas Brinkley also praises the new insights into Kennedy provided by the book's original research when he writes "William Doyle's PT-109 is a masterfully written book on John F. Kennedy's World War II service. Every page sparkles with keen insight and fresh research. Highly recommended."
