= PT-109 (song) =

Single by Jimmy Dean

from the album Portrait of Jimmy Dean
- B-side: "Walk On, Boy"
- Released: 1962
- Recorded: 1962
- Length: 3:09
- Label: Columbia
- Songwriters: Marijohn Wilkin and Fred Burch

Jimmy Dean singles chronology
"To a Sleeping Beauty" (1962)	"PT-109" (1962)	"Steel Men" (1962)

"PT-109" is a 1962 song by Jimmy Dean about the combat service of John F. Kennedy and the crew of the PT-109 in World War II. The boat was famous even before Kennedy ran for office, because Kennedy and most of the crew had survived after it was rammed and cut in two by a Japanese destroyer. After several days on a tiny uninhabited island, Kennedy and the crew were rescued by two native Solomon Islanders—Biuku Gasa and Eroni Kumana, part of an allied Coastwatchers team led by Australian Reg Evans—although the islanders are not mentioned in the song.

In 1961, Dean had recorded "Big Bad John," a song that would become his biggest hit, peaking at number one on the country and pop charts; in "PT-109", he would inject "Big Bad John" by singing the last line "Big John, Big John, Big Bad John" at the end in reference to Kennedy. Dean had five more top forty songs in 1962. "PT-109" was his biggest hit in 1962, reaching the top ten with Kennedy still in the White House — it preceded the 1963 film of the same title. The song was Dean's sixth release on the country chart; it peaked at number three and stayed on the country chart for thirteen weeks. "PT-109" also went to number eight on the pop chart and number two on the Hot Adult Contemporary chart. It was one of several military-themed singles of the 1960s — some pro-military, some anti-military. Others include "Ballad of the Green Berets," "Sink the Bismark," "Billy and Sue," "Gonna Raise a Ruckus Tonight," "Sky Pilot," "Navy Blue," and "Soldier Boy."

== Chart performance ==
Chart (1962)	Peak position
Canada CHUM Chart	33
U.S. Billboard Hot Country Singles	3
U.S. Billboard Hot 100	8
U.S. Billboard Easy Listening	2

== See also ==
- Cultural depictions of John F. Kennedy
