= Arthur Reginald Evans =

Australian coastwatcher

- Born: 14 May 1905; Sydney, New South Wales, Australia
- Died: 31 January 1989 (aged 83)
- Education: Royal Australian Naval College, HMAS Creswell
- Military career
- Allegiance: Australia
- Conflicts: Second World War

Arthur Reginald Evans, DSC (14 May 1905 – 31 January 1989) was an Australian coastwatcher in the Pacific Ocean theatre in World War II. He is chiefly remembered for having played a significant part in the rescue of future US President John F. Kennedy and his surviving crew after their motor torpedo boat, PT-109, was sunk by the Japanese in August 1943.

== Early life ==
Evans was born in Sydney, New South Wales, on 14 May 1905, the oldest of three children to parents Stuart and Edith. Interested in being a sailor, after high school, he was rejected for a cadetship at the naval college in Jervis Bay, so joined as a senior cadet in the local militia instead, eventually becoming a second lieutenant.

In 1929, he went to Vanuatu as the assistant manager of a coconut plantation. He later returned to Sydney and worked for the shipping company, Burns Philp. He worked as a manager for them in the Solomon Islands for the next decade.

== Military career ==
After the outbreak of World War II in Europe, he returned to Australia to enlist in the navy in 1940 but was knocked back. On 25 July 1940, Evans enlisted in the Australian Imperial Force (AIF) and served with the 2/9th Army Field Regiment, Royal Australian Artillery, becoming a Warrant Officer Class 2. He sailed to the Middle East in 1941 with the AIF. When the Pacific war started, his unit was recalled to defend Australia.

After suffering a bout of malaria, he applied for a transfer to the navy. He was discharged from the AIF on 9 October 1942. Two days later he was commissioned as a sub-lieutenant in the Royal Australian Naval Volunteer Reserve (RANVR). He was quickly assigned to serve in the secretive Coast Watch Organisation since his knowledge of the Solomon Islands meant he was of value to Naval Intelligence.

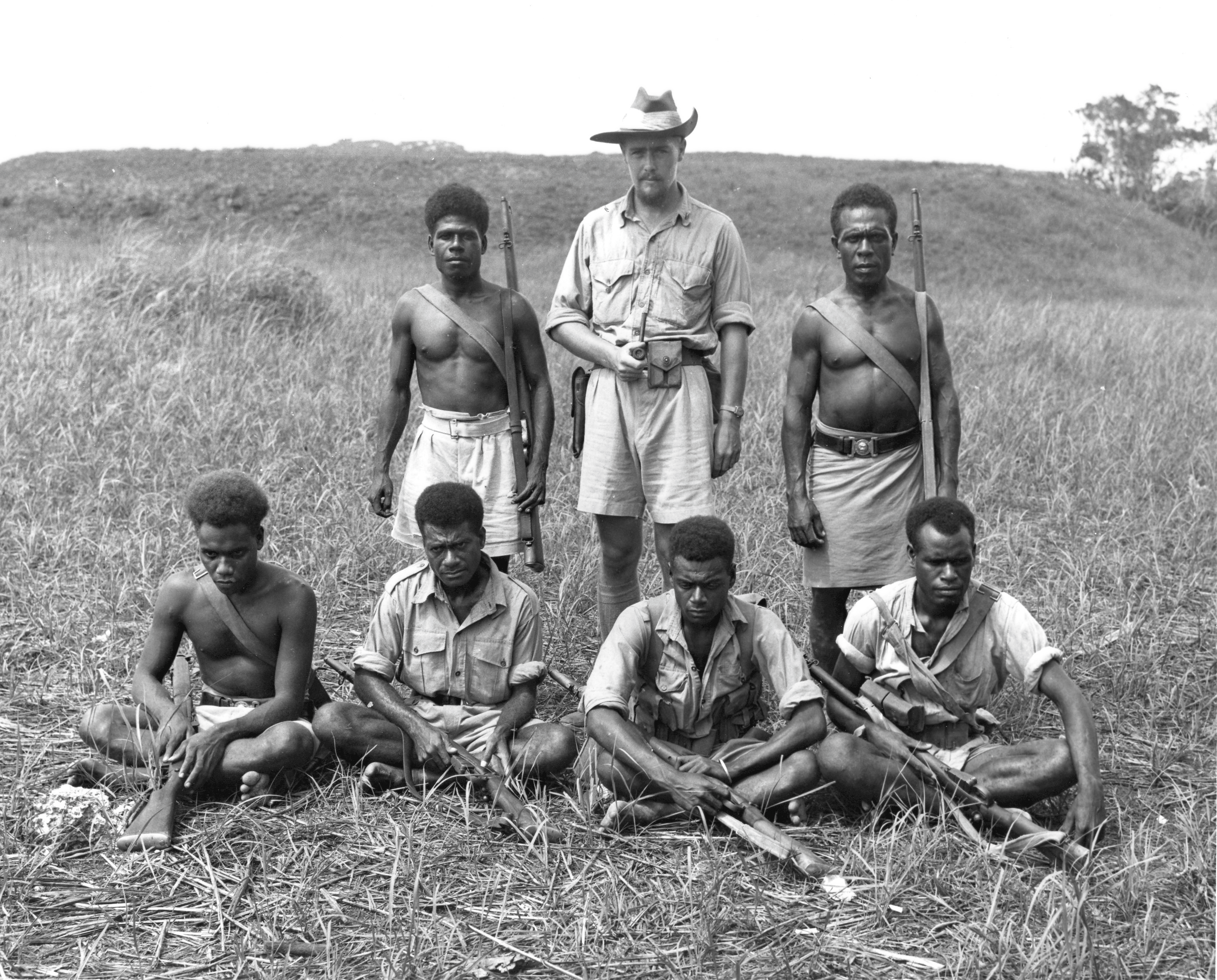
An Australian coastwatcher on Guadalcanal, 1942. The image shows Captain Martin Clemens and native members of the Solomon Islands police force.

In his new role, he was sent to Guadalcanal in December 1942 for further training. He then covertly manned an observation post atop Mount Veve volcano on Kolombangara, a small circular volcanic island, with the aid of local Melanesian guides. Here, he observed the airstrips and the 10,000 Japanese soldiers who were camped at Vila, on the island's southeastern tip. In May 1943, he was joined by Frank Nash, an American sent to assist him. In order to increase the area observed, he requested a relocation to nearby Gomu Island across the Blackett Strait.

=== PT-109 incident ===
In the moonless early hours of 2 August 1943, as Evans was planning to leave for Gomu, he spotted the explosion of John F. Kennedy's boat PT-109, although he did not realise at the time it was an Allied loss. At 9:30 am he received and decoded the Playfair-encrypted message, "PT Boat 109 lost in action in Blackett Strait two miles SW Meresu Cove. Crew of twelve. Request any information."

Evans dispatched one of his five teams of Solomon Islander scouts, Biuku Gasa and Eroni Kumana, in dugout canoes to locate the crew. On 5 August, they located the survivors and returned to Rendova with a message written on a coconut. It read:

NAURO ISL COMMANDER NATIVE KNOWS POS'IT HE CAN PILOT 11 ALIVE NEED SMALL BOAT KENNEDY

On 6 August, Evans sent another canoe with fresh fish, yams, potatoes, corned beef hash, and rice to Kennedy and his crew, with a message stating:

To Senior Officer, Naru Is. Friday 11 pm. Have just learnt of your presence on Naru Is. and also that two natives have taken news to Rendova. I strongly advise you return immediately to here in this canoe and by the time you arrive here I will be in radio communication with authorities at Rendova and we can finalise plans to collect balance your party. (signed) A. R. Evans Lt. R.A.N.V.R. Will warn aviation of your crossing Ferguson Passage.

Kennedy reluctantly returned with the scouts in their canoe, hidden under palm fronds, as Japanese planes patrolled overhead. On Gomu, Evans was waiting at the beach and around 6 pm the two met. He suggested Kennedy proceed to Rendova with some natives but this was rejected. The next morning, he contacted PT headquarters in Rendova and coordinated the rescue efforts via encrypted messages until PT-157 collected Kennedy. With Kennedy aboard, PT-157 rescued the other crew members on Olasana Island in the early morning of 8 August, after dispatching rowing boats to pick them up.

== Post-war ==
Evans continued in his service. He was discharged from the navy in Adelaide on 16 May 1946. He became an accountant for a firm in Sydney.

Although Evans' letter to Kennedy was kept after the rescue, his identity remained obscure in the media for the next 17 years, as his name from the signature was misread, and other details obscured during the war to protect his identity. Searches for him eventually narrowed the possible candidates, and his identity was confirmed after a congratulatory card he sent for the 1961 presidential inauguration was matched by a handwriting expert to the letter.

Evans was then invited to the US, and met with PT-boat veterans in New York in April 1961, and with Kennedy, visiting the White House on 1 May. Earlier, the scouts Gasa and Kumana had been invited to attend his inauguration, but were prevented from attending.

While in the US, Evans appeared on various TV shows and was interviewed by several newspapers. In 1961, Robert J. Donovan interviewed Evans for his 1961 book PT-109: John F. Kennedy in World War II. Evans was mentioned by name in 1962 in Jimmy Dean's "PT-109" song. In 1962, he returned to the Solomons along with celebrity Jack Paar and was able to reunite with his scout friends.

He became best known via the 1963 film PT-109, a Warner Brothers adaptation of Donovan's book, where he was portrayed by Australian Michael Pate. In the film, it was remarked what kind of a job it would be: "it's a lonely job, if he's found, that's how he's going to die". Evans was also depicted in an episode of Adventure Unlimited.

After the death of Kennedy, the framed letter, and the famous coconut message, was sent to the president's library. In 1973, Walter Lord met Evans while researching his 1977 coastwatcher book, Lonely Vigil. He was featured in a 2002 National Geographic special, The Search for Kennedy's PT 109 and the 2010 Patrick Lindsay book, The Coast Watchers, Behind Enemy Lines: The Men Who Saved the Pacific. He appeared in the 2015 William Doyle book, PT 109: An American Epic of War, Survival, and the Destiny of John F. Kennedy.

== Personal life ==
Evans met Getrude Slaney Poole, an amateur actress from Adelaide, who was working in the Solomons in the late 1930s as a secretary to a female lawyer. The couple married in August 1940, three weeks after he joined the army. Gertrude died on 24 June 1963, a month prior to the PT-109 film's Australian premiere. No mention was made of children in the funeral notice.

Evans later remarried another woman, Fran, who also predeceased him. He died aged 83 on 31 January 1989.

== Portrayals ==
- Michael Pate (1963) - PT 109
