= PT 109 (film) =

1963 film by Leslie H. Martinson

- Film poster by Frank McCarthy
- Directed by: Leslie H. Martinson; Lewis Milestone
- Written by: Screenplay: Richard L. Breen; Adaptation: Vincent X. Flaherty; Howard Sheehan
- Based on: John F. Kennedy in World War II by Robert J. Donovan
- Produced by: Bryan Foy
- Starring: Cliff Robertson
- Narrated by: Andrew Duggan (uncredited)
- Cinematography: Robert Surtees
- Edited by: Folmar Blangsted
- Music by: David Buttolph; William Lava
- Production company: Warner Bros. Pictures
- Distributed by: Warner Bros. Pictures
- Release date: June 19, 1963 (U.S.)
- Running time: 140 minutes
- Language: English
- Budget: $4 million
- Box office: est. $3.5 million (US/Canada rentals)

PT 109 is a 1963 American Technicolor Panavision biographical war film depicting the actions of John F. Kennedy as an officer of the United States Navy in command of Motor Torpedo Boat PT-109 in the Pacific theater of World War II. The film was adapted by Vincent Flaherty and Howard Sheehan from the book PT 109: John F. Kennedy in World War II by Robert J. Donovan, and the screenplay was written by Richard L. Breen. Cliff Robertson stars as Kennedy, with featured performances by Ty Hardin, James Gregory, Robert Culp and Grant Williams.

PT 109 was the first commercial theatrical film about a U.S. president released while he was still in office (although FDR was often depicted in small roles during his administration, most notably in Yankee Doodle Dandy). It was released domestically on June 19, 1963, five months before Kennedy was assassinated in Dallas, Texas.

== Plot ==
In August 1942 the American forces are fighting the Japanese in the South Pacific during World War II. Fresh out of PT boat training school in Melville, Rhode Island, U.S. Navy Lieutenant, junior grade John F. Kennedy used his wealthy and powerful family's influence to get himself assigned to the fighting in the Solomon Islands, a hotbed in the Pacific Theater.

Once there he lobbies for command and is given the well worn PT 109. Initially, Tulagi's irascible boat maintenance officer Commander C. R. Ritchie is unimpressed with the young, untested Kennedy, but the lieutenant is undaunted. With a hodge-podge crew anchored by Ensign Leonard J. Thom as executive officer and initially skeptical sailors "Bucky" Harris and Edmund Drewitch he gets the 109 seaworthy again.

Without enough fuel for the return trip, the PT 109 is dispatched on an emergency mission to evacuate paramarines pinned down on a distant beach after disrupting the Japanese in the Raid on Choiseul. Under heavy fire Kennedy rescues the survivors, but barely gets out of range before his engines run out of fuel. Drawn shoreward by an incoming tide, the boat and its passengers are saved from disaster when a tow arrives just in time.

The 109 is then relocated to a base on Rendova. While on patrol one dark, moonless night in August 1943, the radar-less boat is throttled down and searching for a Japanese convoy returning from a supply mission via "The Slot". Out of nowhere an Imperial Navy destroyer appears, and before Kennedy can react the PT 109 is rammed and sliced in half, killing two of her 13 crewmen.

Towing a badly burned crew member by a life jacket strap clenched in his teeth, Kennedy leads the survivors to Plum Pudding Island. The next day the abandoned wreckage is spotted by a reconnaissance plane, and the 109's crew is presumed lost with all hands. After dark, Kennedy swims out into the channel with a signal lantern, staying out all night in the hope of flagging down a passing U.S. vessel. The next night, he sends out a friend who tagged along on the mission, Ensign George Ross.

After several fruitless days morale drops and Kennedy is forced to quell an uprising determined to surrender. Hoping for better prospects of food and water on a nearby island, he leads the crew on another three-mile swim. There two rifle-armed natives show up in a canoe and hold the men at gunpoint, confused as to their identity and affiliation. As the pair do not understand English but appear receptive, Kennedy carves a message on a coconut requesting rescue and gives it to them. They take it to Australian coastwatcher Lieutenant Reginald Evans. Evans notifies the U.S. Navy, and the men are rescued by PT boat without any further loss of life.

As a result of their ordeal Kennedy and his men are eligible for leave back in the U.S., but he and several loyal crewmembers elect to stay and continue the fight on a new combat-weathered boat.

== Cast ==
- Cliff Robertson as Lieutenant (j.g.) John F. Kennedy, skipper of PT Boat 109.
- James Gregory as Commander C. R. Ritchie, base boat maintenance officer of Tulagi Naval Base.
- Ty Hardin as Ensign Leonard J. Thom, XO of PT Boat 109.
- Robert Culp as Ensign George "Barney" Ross
- Grant Williams as Lieutenant Alvin Cluster, Commander MTB Squadron 2.
- Michael Pate as Lieutenant Reginald Evans, RANVR.
- Lew Gallo as Yeoman Rogers
- John Ward as John Maguire, Radioman 2nd class.
- Biff Elliot as Edgar E. Mauer, Seaman 1st class.
- David Whorf as Raymond Albert, Seaman 2nd class.
- Sam Reese as Andrew Kirksey, Torpedoman's Mate 2nd class.
- Robert Blake as Charles "Bucky" Harris, Gunner's Mate 2nd class.
- Buzz Martin as Maurice Kowal, Gunner's Mate 3rd class.
- Norman Fell as Edmund Drewitch. Motor Machinist Mate 2nd class.
- Clyde Howdy as Leon Drawdy, Motor Machinist Mate 2nd class.
- Joseph Gallison as Harold Marney, Motor Machinist Mate 2nd class.
- Errol John as Benjamin Kevu
- Sam Gilman as Raymond Starkey
- William Douglas as Gerard Zinser
- James McCallion as Pat McMahon
- Glenn Sipes as William Johnson
- Dean Smith as Lieutenant Liebenow
- Andrew Duggan as the narrator (uncredited)
- George Takei as helmsman of the Japanese destroyer (uncredited)
- George Gaynes as Commander, Motor Torpedo Boat Flotilla One (uncredited)

== Production ==
=== Development ===
Kennedy's father, Joseph Kennedy Sr., had been the U.S. ambassador to Great Britain at the onset of World War II, as well as an influential Hollywood producer and former head of RKO studio. He negotiated the film rights to Donovan's 1961 biography of his son. The film was made under the "personal supervision" of Warner's head of production, Jack L. Warner. The White House sent former PT boat commander Alvin Cluster, a wartime buddy of President Kennedy and his former commanding officer, to act as a liaison between Warner Bros. Pictures and the White House.

Among other actors considered for the lead were Peter Fonda, who objected to having to deliver his screen test using an impersonation of Kennedy's voice; Warren Beatty (Jacqueline Kennedy's choice); Jeffrey Hunter, who had just finished playing Jesus Christ in King of Kings; and Warner Bros Television contract stars Edd Byrnes, Peter Brown, Chad Everett and Roger Smith. Kennedy set three conditions on the film: that it be historically accurate, that profits go to the survivors of the PT 109 and their families, and that he would have the final choice of lead actor. He selected and then met with Robertson after viewing the screen tests.

Though Robertson was stockier and 13 years older than Kennedy had been in the South Pacific, having served in the Merchant Marine as a third mate during World War II, he was chosen because (as Alvin Cluster told him), "The President picked you not only because you were a fine actor but because you're young looking, yet mature enough so that the world won't get the idea the President was being played by a parking lot attendant or something." This was a reference to Edd Byrnes, who played "Kookie" in that role on the then hit television series 77 Sunset Strip.

Kennedy also vetoed Raoul Walsh as director after screening and panning Walsh's Marines Let's Go.

=== Filming ===
Original director Lewis Milestone, who had previously filmed All Quiet on the Western Front, A Walk in the Sun and Pork Chop Hill, left the production, either because Milestone thought that the script was inadequate or because the studio was unhappy with cost overruns. Milestone was replaced by Leslie Martinson, a television director with little experience making films.

The exteriors were filmed at Little Palm Island (formerly Little Munson Island), now a resort in the Florida Keys. Power and fresh water were run out to the island for the film, allowing the resort to be built years later. The construction of the sets and the presence of boats and other paraphernalia during filming gave rise to rumors of another U.S. invasion of Cuba.

Australian actor Michael Pate played a real Australian coastwatcher who helped save Kennedy.

At the time the film was being planned it was found that the few surviving 80-foot Elco PT boats were not in operational condition. Though a further search was conducted it was determined that none could be located for use in the film, as almost all had been destroyed in-Theatre at the end of World War II. Former World War II-era United States Army Air Forces 85-foot crash rescue boats were converted to resemble Elco PT boats. These were designed by Dair N. Long in 1944, and their use as movie props was ideal because they possessed performance and profiles similar to the Elcos. American AT-6 Texan training planes stood in for Japanese Zeros.

U.S. Navy support included the destroyer USS Saufley, the landing ship USS Duval County and smaller vessels, such as landing craft and motor whaleboats from nearby Naval Station Key West.

After seeing the film, Kennedy called PT 109 a "good product," but worried about the two hour, 20-minute length. "It's just a question of whether there's too much of it."

== Accuracy ==
In the film the PT 109 and all other PT boats are painted in the same standard gray paint scheme used by larger warships of the U.S. Navy. Although many Higgins and Elco PT boats were likely delivered from the manufacturer (to be shipped upon oceangoing navy cargo vessels) with such a paint scheme, historical records indicate that PT 109 and the other boats in its squadron were painted dark green once in the Solomons in order to better blend into jungle backdrops at forward operating bases.

The film also depicts PT 109 as reported missing and a search is started. According to National Geographic and the original book, though the boat explosion was observed from other PT boats in the vicinity and the vessel was given up as lost, at least an air reconnaissance was later conducted. When it was unsuccessful, a memorial service was held at the motor torpedo boat squadron's forward operating base at Rendova while the crew was still marooned on the islands in the vicinity of Japanese-held Kolombagara Island.

Solomon Islanders Biuku Gasa and Eroni Kumana are portrayed as random natives, when in fact they were dispatched by the coastwatcher, Reg Evans, to find the sailors. The film shows Ensign Ross first suggesting the idea of using a coconut for a message, using a knife to carve it. Gasa later claimed to have suggested the idea and to have sent Kumana to pluck a fresh coconut. The actors playing Gasa and Kumana were not credited, though the senior native is mentioned by name when the large canoe arrives.

The scene showing the rescue of ambushed Marines actually occurred after the sinking of the PT 109, when Kennedy had been given command of PT 59. It was an older model 77-foot Elco PT boat that had had its torpedo launchers removed and was reconfigured into a heavily armed gunboat at Kennedy's request, as U.S. Navy Mark 8 torpedoes of that era were notoriously inaccurate and Kennedy had already provisionally mounted a 37 mm antitank gun on the bow of the 109 before its loss. It was the 59's exceptional firepower that allowed it to be successful in its rescue of Marines pinned down in close quarters on Choiseul.

== Reception ==
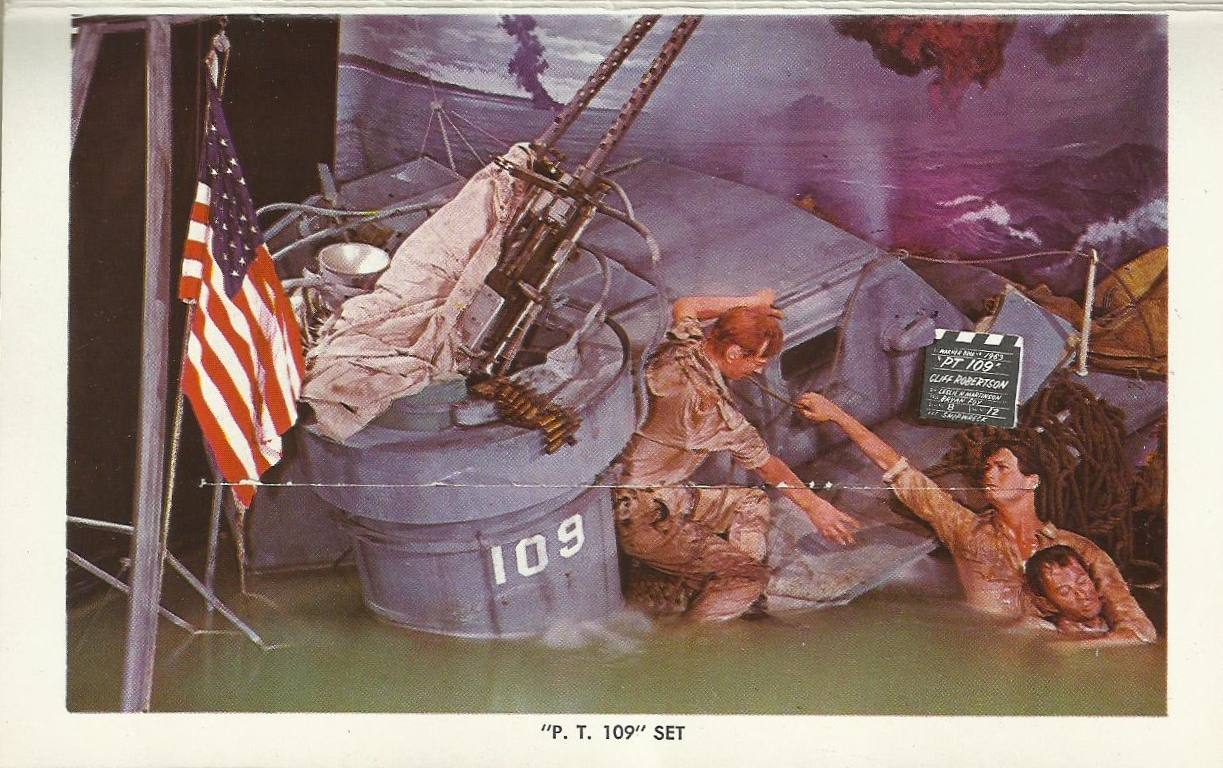
PT 109 in Movieland Wax Museum

PT 109 was released to lukewarm critical response, although Robertson received good reviews. As of September 2020, Rotten Tomatoes rates the film at 64% approval. One review comments that "One of the screenplay's pluses ... is its concentration on the minor but still deadly activities that were undertaken by thousands of men during World War II. Not everyone was involved with the major assaults; many spent their time risking their lives in places and situations of which most people are totally unaware, and it's a nice change of pace to see this aspect of the war dramatized."

During its initial run, prior to Kennedy's assassination, a theater marquee in Georgia showing the film declared "See how the Japs almost got Kennedy."

The film earned theatrical rentals of $2.7 million in the United States and Canada before it was withdrawn following Kennedy's assassination. They estimated it would go on to earn $3.5 million.

== Canadian release ==
In some Canadian cities, such as Saskatoon, Saskatchewan, PT 109 premiered in theaters on November 22, 1963, the day that Kennedy was assassinated.

== Home media ==
Warner Home Video released the film on VHS on February 9, 1983, as part of its "A Night At the Movies" series, featuring a Hearst Metrotone Newsreel, the Warner Bros. animated short Banty Raids and a trailer of films from 1963. Warner Archives released the film on DVD in the United States on May 10, 2011.

The film has occasionally aired on Turner Classic Movies and has also periodically aired in letterbox format on the Military Channel in the United States.

According to Oliver Stone during a 2013 interview with Nerdist, PT 109 would be included in his Untold History documentary miniseries box set.

== Comic book adaption ==
- Gold Key: PT 109 (September 1964)

== See also ==
- List of American films of 1963
- Cultural depictions of John F. Kennedy
