= USS Duval County =

1944 LST-542-class tank landing ship

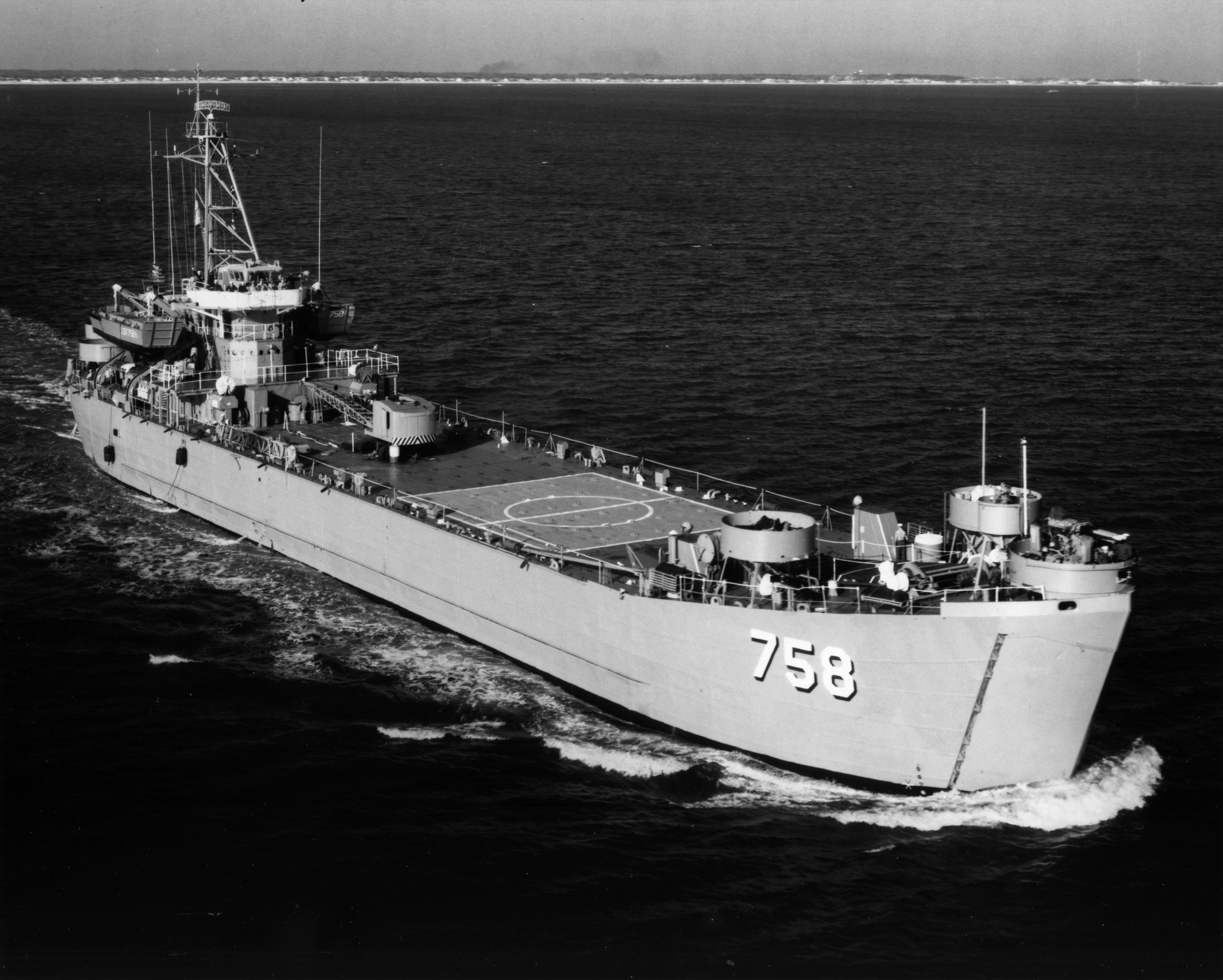
- Duval County (LST-758) off the Virginia Capes, 27 March 1968

History

United States
- Name: USS LST-758
- Builder: American Bridge Company, Ambridge, Pennsylvania
- Laid down: 5 June 1944
- Launched: 25 July 1944
- Commissioned: 19 August 1944
- Decommissioned: 13 July 1946
- Recommissioned: 3 November 1950
- Decommissioned: 28 October 1969
- Renamed: USS Duval County (LST-758), 1 July 1955
- Stricken: 1 November 1976
- Honours and awards: 2 battle stars (World War II); 4 battle stars (Korea)
- Fate: Sold, 18 August 1981

General characteristics
- Class & type: LST-542-class tank landing ship
- Displacement: 1,625 long tons (1,651 t) light; 3,640 long tons (3,698 t) full
- Length: 328 ft (100 m)
- Beam: 50 ft (15 m)
- Draft: 8 ft (2.4 m) forward; 14 ft 4 in (4.37 m) aft
- Propulsion: 2 × General Motors 12-567 diesel engines, two shafts
- Speed: 12 knots (22 km/h; 14 mph)
- Boats & landing craft carried: 2 LCVPs
- Troops: Approximately 130 officers and enlisted men
- Complement: 8-10 officers, 89-100 enlisted men
- Armament: 1 × single 3-inch/50-caliber gun mount; 8 × 40 mm guns; 12 × 20 mm guns

The USS Duval County (LST-758) was an LST-542-class tank landing ship that was built for the United States Navy during World War II. Named after counties in Florida and Texas, she was the only U.S. naval vessel to bear the name.

The LST-758 was laid down on June 5, 1944, at Ambridge, Pennsylvania by the American Bridge Company. Launched on July 25, 1944, it was sponsored by Mrs. F. D. Colburn and commissioned on August 19, 1944.

== Service history ==
During World War II, the LST-758 was assigned to the Asiatic-Pacific theater and participated in the assault and occupation of Iwo Jima in February 1945, and the assault and occupation of Okinawa Guntō in April through June 1945.

After the war, she performed occupation duty in the Far East until mid-September 1945. The LST-758 was decommissioned on July 13, 1946, and recommissioned on November 3, 1950, for service in the Korean War. She was stationed in Korea until late November 1953. James E. Thompson boarded the 758 in November 1950, and was discharged from it on February 1, 1954.

She was scheduled to leave Korea in July 1953. When the armistice was signed in June, however, she was held over to return prisoners from Koje Do Island to Inchon. Pens were built on the tank deck that held six hundred prisoners. She made three trips to Inchon. She subsequently sailed to Long Beach, California in November.

On July 1, 1955, the ship was redesignated as the USS Duval County (LST-758). Following the Korean War, she saw extensive service with the Pacific and Atlantic Fleets through 1969. She was utilized in the filming of the opening action sequences in the movie "PT 109" in 1962. The Duval County was decommissioned on October 28, 1969. Laid up in the Reserve Fleet, the ship was struck from the Naval Vessel Register on November 1, 1976. After custody was transferred to MARAD for lay up in the National Defense Reserve Fleet, she was sold by MARAD on August 18, 1981. Her final fate is unknown.

The LST-758 earned two battle stars for World War II service and four battle stars during the Korean War.

She made a brief appearance in the movie PT 109 (film).

== See also ==
- List of United States Navy LSTs
- Duval County, Florida
- Duval County, Texas

== Gallery ==
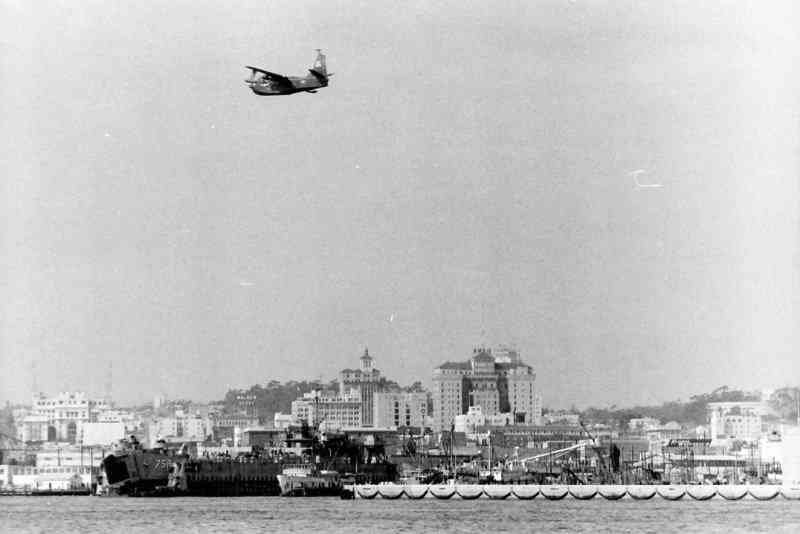
USS Duval County (LST-758) in drydock at San Diego, September 1960, with Martin P5M Marlin flying boat passing overhead
