= The Search for Kennedy's PT 109 =

2002 television film of the search for PT-109

The Search for Kennedy's PT 109 is a National Geographic television special and video on DVD, directed by Peter Getzels. It documents the true story of John F. Kennedy's PT-109 from World War II, and the successful search for the ship by Dr. Robert Ballard.

== Details ==
The wreckage of PT-109 was located in May 2002, when a National Geographic Society expedition, headed by Ballard, found a torpedo tube amongst wreckage that matched the description, and location, of Kennedy's vessel in the Solomon Islands. The boat was identified by Dale Ridder, a weapons and explosives expert on the U.S. Marine Forensics Panel. The forward section was later found using remote-viewing equipment, however, the stern was never discovered. Much of the half-buried wreckage and grave site was left undisturbed in accordance with Navy policy.

During the expedition, they meet and interview Biuku Gasa and Eroni Kumana, the original two natives who were dispatched by coastwatcher Reg Evans to find Kennedy's shipwrecked crew after the Navy had given them up for dead. Max Kennedy, Kennedy's nephew, who joined Ballard on the expedition, presented a bust of Kennedy to the two men.

== Media ==
A DVD of the National Geographic television special and book of the expedition were later released.

== See also ==
- Cultural depictions of John F. Kennedy
