= Biuku Gasa and Eroni Kumana =

Solomon Islanders who found the survivors of the PT-109 crew

Biuku Gasa (27 July 1923 – 23 November 2005) and Eroni Kumana (c. 1918 – 2 August 2014) were Solomon Islanders of Melanesian descent who found John F. Kennedy and his surviving PT-109 crew following the boat's collision with the Japanese destroyer Amagiri near Plum Pudding Island on 1 August 1943. They were from the Western Province of the Solomon Islands.

== PT-109 search and rescue ==
During World War II, Gasa and Kumana were tasked with patrolling the waters of the Solomon Sea near Gizo by Australian coastwatcher Sub-Lieutenant Reg Evans, who manned a secret observation post at the top of Kolombangara island's Mount Veve volcano, and had five two-man teams of islanders working for him. Evans had spotted an explosion on 1 August, and later that morning decoded news that the explosion he had witnessed was probably from the lost PT-109. On 2 August, Gasa and Kumana were dispatched by Evans to search in their dugout canoe for possible PT-109 survivors.

Abandoning their sinking ship, Kennedy and his men swam first to Plum Pudding island – which was later named after him. They later abandoned the tiny island and swam to tiny Olasana Island in search of food and water. There, they found coconuts and fresh water which were of some small help to his men, and it was where they were discovered by the two islander men. The canoe couldn't accommodate all of the PT-109 crewmen safely, and all had difficulty communicating with each other.

In the absence of writing utensils, Gasa suggested that Kennedy should inscribe a message on the husk of a coconut he had taken from a nearby palm tree: "NAURO ISL... COMMANDER... NATIVE KNOWS POS'IT... HE CAN PILOT... 11 ALIVE... NEED SMALL BOAT... KENNEDY".

This message, after rowing their dugout canoe at great risk through 35 nmi (65 km) of hostile waters patrolled by the Japanese, was then delivered to the nearest Allied base at Rendova. They enabled the ensuing return to Olasana and the successful American rescue operation on 7 August.

== Later years ==
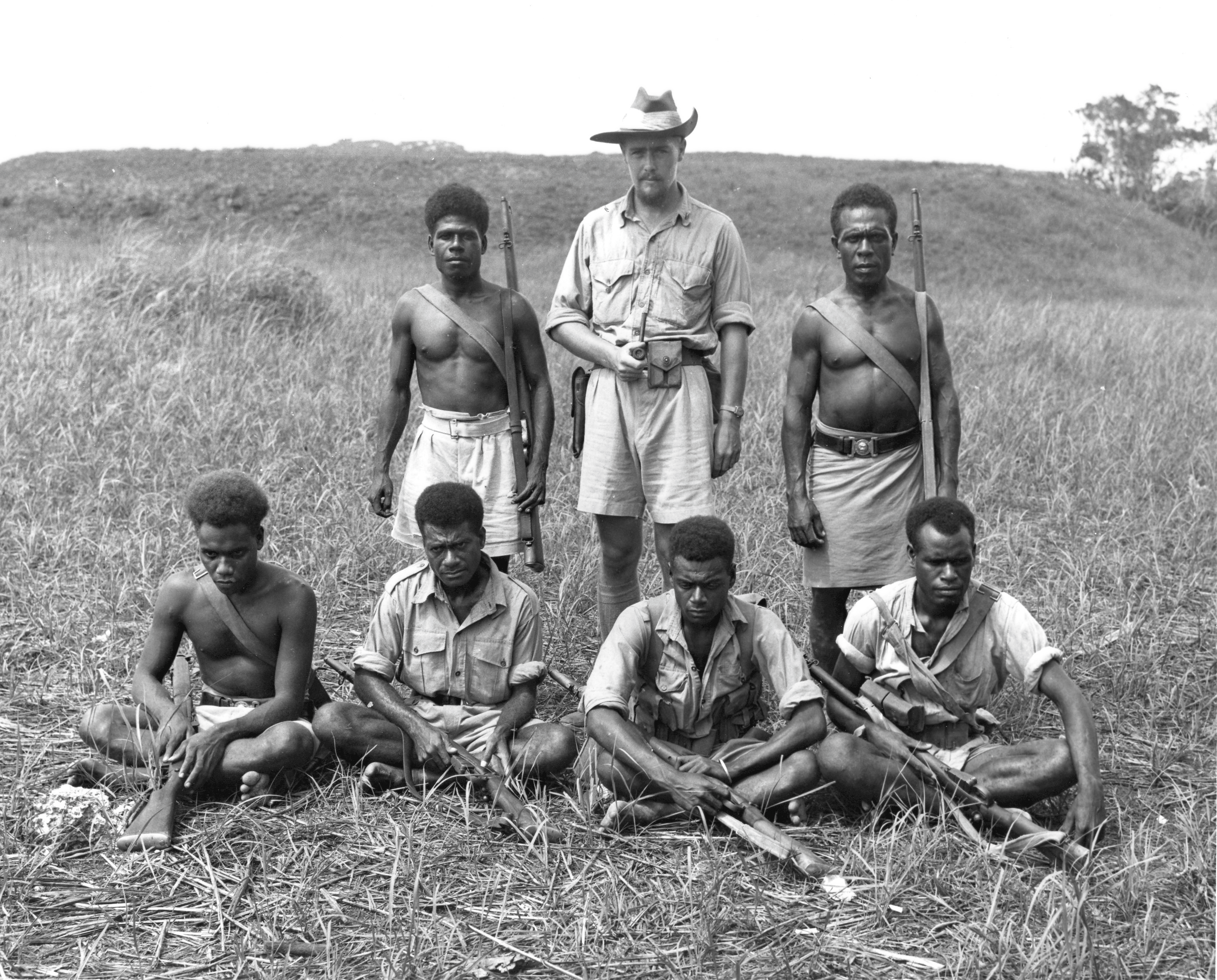
Captain Martin Clemens and six fellow members of the British Solomon Islands Protectorate Defence Force (BSIPDF). Gasa and Kumani would have dressed in a similar manner during World War II.

Kennedy later invited them to attend his presidential inauguration on 20 January 1961, but after the pair arrived in Honiara, the capital of the Solomon Islands, they were "duped" by colonial officials who sent other people as representatives instead. Kumana claimed that after they arrived at the airport, a clerk met with the pair and informed them that they could not attend the inauguration due to their inability to speak English, which saddened Kumana.

=== Recognition ===
Another scout, Alesasa Bisili, wrote of his experience during the 1942 Japanese landing at Munda in Scouting in Western Solomons. He expressed sadness and anger over the unjust lack of recognition or award given to Solomon Islanders for their services during the war.

However, in recognition of his help, Gasa lived in a house paid for by the Kennedy family ($5,000), National Geographic ($5,000) and the balance ($15,000) by Brian and Sue Mitchell. (The BBC reference that the Kennedy family paid for the entire house is incorrect.) The house was designed by Brian Mitchell in co-operation with a Brisbane-based Australian architect. Melody Miller, Senator Edward Kennedy's Press Secretary, was responsible for pulling all the parties together after being approached by the Mitchells. The Kennedys also constructed a house for Eroni Kumana. It collapsed in the 2007 tsunami, but Kumana survived the storm.

Gasa and Kumana were interviewed by National Geographic in 2002, and can be seen on the DVD of the television special. They were presented a bust by Max Kennedy, a son of Robert F. Kennedy. The National Geographic had gone there as part of an expedition by Robert Ballard, the discoverer of the wreck of the Titanic, who did find the remains of the PT-109. The special was called The Search for Kennedy's PT 109.

Ambassador Caroline Kennedy met John Koloni, the son of Kumana, and Nelma Ane, daughter of Gasa at a ceremony in August 2023 in Honiara to mark the 80th anniversary of the battle of Guadalcanal. She also visited the places that her father had swum to after the sinking of PT 109.

== Lives ==
Biuku Gasa was born 27 July 1923, in Madou, Solomon Islands, and lived in Vavudu Village, Kauvi Island, in the Western Solomons. He went to a Seventh-day Adventist missionary school, but did not speak English well. After the war Gasa and his wife Nelma had six children. They lived off coconuts and crops. They also caught fish in Vonavona lagoon. Gasa was the local patriarch, as most of the residents are descendants of the "old man" – as he was known – and he rarely left the island.

Gasa was still alive in August 2005 when the Pacific edition of Time magazine wrote that he was sick in the hospital. His children built a dugout canoe just like the ones the old man had made in his youth, to send to the United States "so they would not forget". Gasa died on 23 November 2005, the 42nd anniversary of Kennedy's assassination (for countries west of the International Date Line).

Eroni Kumana said he was 78 in 2003, and would have been 18 in 1943. Also schooled by Adventist missionaries, he lived in Konqu Village, Ranongga Island. He was seen in National Geographic photographs with a hat and a T-shirt that read "I rescued JFK". Kumana created a shrine with an obelisk to JFK, and appointed him honorary chief. Kumana died on 2 August 2014, 71 years to the day after the search mission began. He was 96.

== See also ==
- History of Solomon Islands
