= Melody Miller =

Aide to the Kennedy family (1945–2022)

Melody Jean Miller (February 19, 1945 – November 8, 2022) was an American political staffer. She was an aide to the Kennedy family from the time she was a college intern for Jacqueline Kennedy Onassis.

== Biography ==
Miller was born in Seattle, Washington, on February 19, 1945. She grew up in Arlington, Virginia, graduated from Yorktown High School and attended Pennsylvania State University, studying education and political science.

Miller married Paul McElligott and James Rogers before marrying William P. Wilson who worked for JFK and died in 2014. Wilson "negotiated the terms of Kennedy’s historic first televised debate with Richard M. Nixon in 1960".

Miller was found dead from a heart attack in her home in Washington, D.C., on November 8, 2022. She was 77.

== Career ==
In 1968, she was the last person to turn out the lights in Robert F. Kennedy’s Senate office after he was assassinated. Miller went to work for him after she graduated from Penn State. She then spent thirty seven years working for Ted Kennedy as a legislative and press aide and then deputy press secretary. Some of the jobs she did was help Jackie Kennedy handle the condolences sent after John F. Kennedy’s death and Rose Kennedy’s 100th birthday celebration.
