= PT-109 (video game) =

1987 video game

- Developer: Digital Illusions
- Publisher: Spectrum HoloByte
- Platforms: MS-DOS, Classic Mac OS
- Release: NA: 1987
- Genre: Naval simulation
- Mode: Single-player

PT-109 is a naval simulation video game developed by Digital Illusions and published by Spectrum HoloByte in 1987 for Classic Mac OS and MS-DOS. This game is roughly based on the events involving the Motor Torpedo Boat PT-109.

== Gameplay ==
PT-109 is a torpedo-boat simulation game which starts in the practice-tactics mode to teach new players how to operate the boat, fire torpedoes, read radar on different displays, using the engine muffler to approach quietly, operating smoke screens, and locate other weaponry. Players also learn about the history of the ship, because some of the patrol boats were only available at specific stages during World War II. The game has four levels of difficulty, and it also gives the player the ability to send radio messages to the base to request air or ship support, an automatic pilot feature, and assignment of patrols.

== Reception ==
A Computer Gaming World reviewer in 1988 called PT-109 "a remarkable achievement", but stated that he no longer played the game because he had played all of the preprogrammed patrols several times and knew what would happen. He recommended using the practice mode to become familiar with the game, instead of the lowest difficulty level, to maximize its lifetime. 1991 and 1993 surveys of strategy and war games gave it two and a half stars out of five. In 1988, Dragon gave the Macintosh version of the game 4 out of 5 stars. They in 1989 gave the MS-DOS version 4½ out of 5 stars. The Palm Beach Post in 1988 approved of the Macintosh version's improved graphics compared to Gato, but reported that campaign enemies did not correctly react to the player.

== Legacy ==
A remake of PT-109, called PT Boat Simulator, was released for MS-DOS in 1994.
