= SS Joseph Stanton =

Liberty ship of WWII

History

United States
- Name: Joseph Stanton
- Namesake: Joseph Stanton
- Owner: War Shipping Administration (WSA)
- Operator: Agwilines Inc.
- Ordered: as type (EC2-S-C1) hull, MCE hull 304
- Awarded: 1 May 1941
- Builder: Bethlehem-Fairfield Shipyard, Baltimore, Maryland
- Cost: $1,074,509
- Yard number: 2054
- Way number: 14
- Laid down: 2 May 1942
- Launched: 4 July 1942
- Sponsored by: Miss Ruth Reece
- Completed: 18 July 1942
- Identification: Call sign: KFJX
- Fate: Laid up in the National Defense Reserve Fleet, Wilmington, North Carolina, 29 March 1948; Sold for scrapping, 27 March 1964, withdrawn from fleet, 17 April 1964

General characteristics
- Class & type: Liberty ship; type EC2-S-C1, standard
- Tonnage: 10,865 LT DWT; 7,176 GRT
- Displacement: 3,380 long tons (3,434 t) (light); 14,245 long tons (14,474 t) (max)
- Length: 441 feet 6 inches (135 m) oa; 416 feet (127 m) pp; 427 feet (130 m) lwl
- Beam: 57 feet (17 m)
- Draft: 27 ft 9.25 in (8.4646 m)
- Installed power: 2 × Oil fired 450 °F (232 °C) boilers, operating at 220 psi (1,500 kPa); 2,500 hp (1,900 kW)
- Propulsion: 1 × triple-expansion steam engine, (manufactured by Worthington Pump & Machinery Corp, Harrison, New Jersey); 1 × screw propeller
- Speed: 11.5 knots (21.3 km/h; 13.2 mph)
- Capacity: 562,608 cubic feet (15,931 m^{3}) (grain); 499,573 cubic feet (14,146 m^{3}) (bale)
- Complement: 38–62 USMM; 21–40 USNAG
- Armament: Varied by ship; Bow-mounted 3-inch (76 mm)/50-caliber gun; Stern-mounted 4-inch (102 mm)/50-caliber gun; 2–8 × single 20-millimeter (0.79 in) Oerlikon anti-aircraft (AA) cannons and/or, 2–8 × 37-millimeter (1.46 in) M1 AA guns

SS Joseph Stanton was a Liberty ship built in the United States during World War II. She was named after Joseph Stanton, an American military officer during the American Revolutionary War, raising to the rank of major general, in the Continental Army, in command of the Rhode Island Militia. He was a delegate to the Rhode Island Constitutional Convention in 1790, which ratified the United States Constitution and enabled Rhode Island, to be the last of the 13 colonies to join the Union. He was elected by the General Assembly to serve as one of the first two US Senators from Rhode Island, and served from 12 June 1790 to 3 March 1793, as a member of the Anti-Administration Party. He was later elected to the United States House of Representatives, where he served from 4 March 1801 to 3 March 1807, as a member of the Jeffersonian Democrat-Republican Party.

== Construction ==
Joseph Stanton was laid down on 2 May 1942, under a Maritime Commission (MARCOM) contract, MCE hull 304, by the Bethlehem-Fairfield Shipyard, Baltimore, Maryland; she was sponsored by Miss Ruth Reece, the niece of J.A. Bouslog, the manager of the Middle Atlantic District for MARCOM, and was launched on 4 July 1942.

== History ==
She was allocated to Agwilines Inc., on 18 July 1942. On 24 October 1947, she was laid up in the National Defense Reserve Fleet, Wilmington, North Carolina. On 27 March 1964, she was sold for scrapping to Northern Metal Co., for $45,045. She was removed from the fleet on 17 April 1964.

== Bibliography ==
- "Bethlehem-Fairfield, Baltimore MD". www.ShipbuildingHistory.com. 14 August 2008.
- Maritime Administration. "Joseph Stanton". Ship History Database Vessel Status Card. U.S. Department of Transportation, Maritime Administration.
- Davies, James (May 2004). "Specifications (As-Built)" (PDF). p. 23.
- "SS Joseph Stanton".
