= Mount Veve =

Mountain in the Solomon Islands

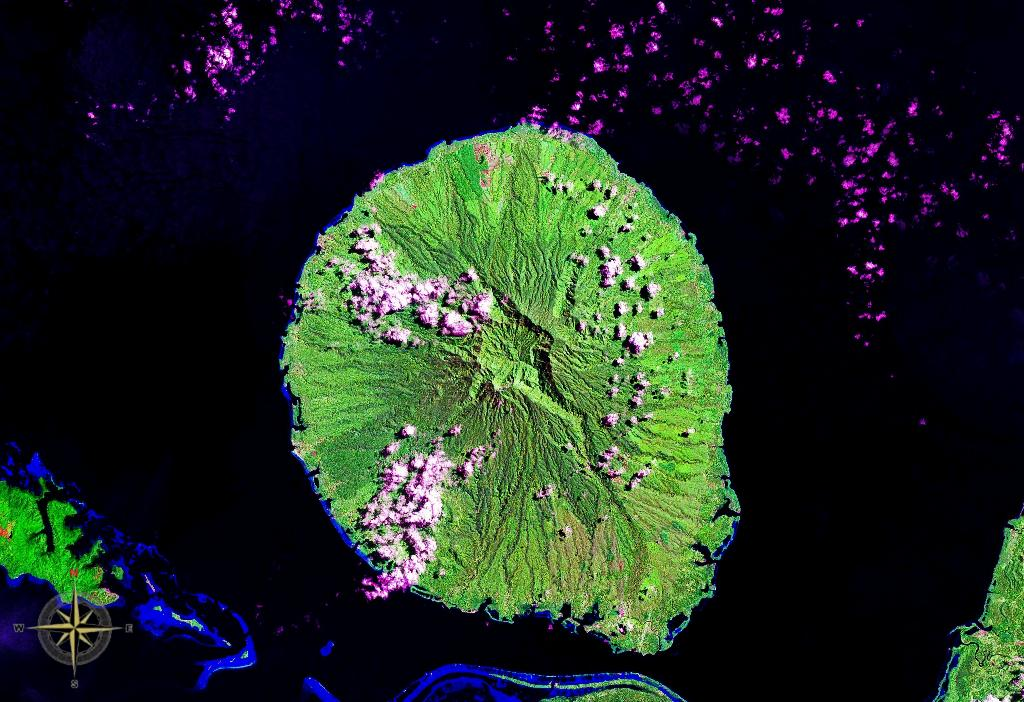
- Kolombangara seen from space (false color). Mount Veve is clearly visible.

Highest point
- Elevation: 1,768 m (5,801 ft)
- Prominence: 1,768 m (5,801 ft)
- Listing: Ultra; Ribu
- Coordinates: 7°57′00″S 157°04′30″E

Geography
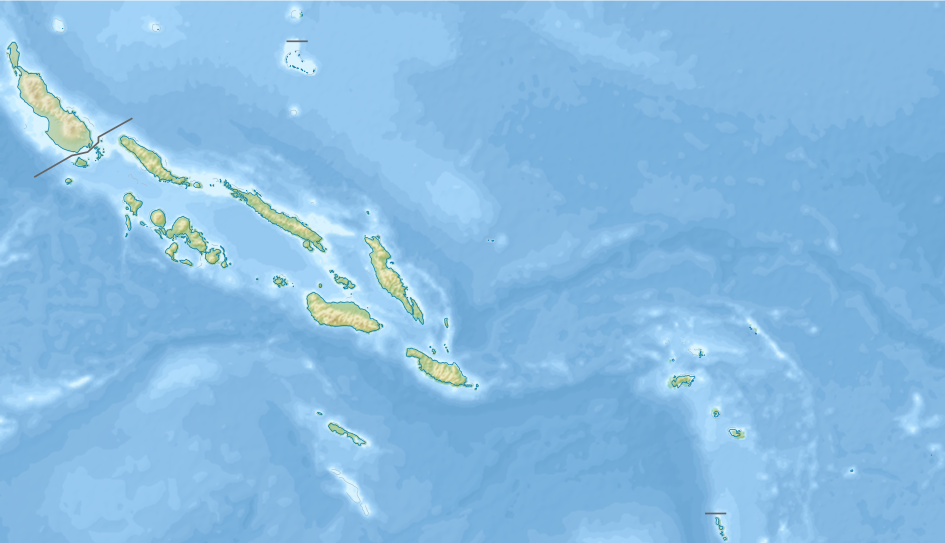
- Location within Solomon Islands
- Location: Kolombangara, Solomon Islands

Geology
- Mountain type: Stratovolcano
- Last eruption: Pleistocene

Mount Veve is a dormant stratovolcano on the island of Kolombangara, in the Solomon Islands. With an elevation of 1,768 metres (5,801 ft), it is the island's highest point.

== See also ==
- List of ultras of Oceania
- List of islands by highest point
