= Kolombangara =

Island in Solomon Islands

Native name: Nduke
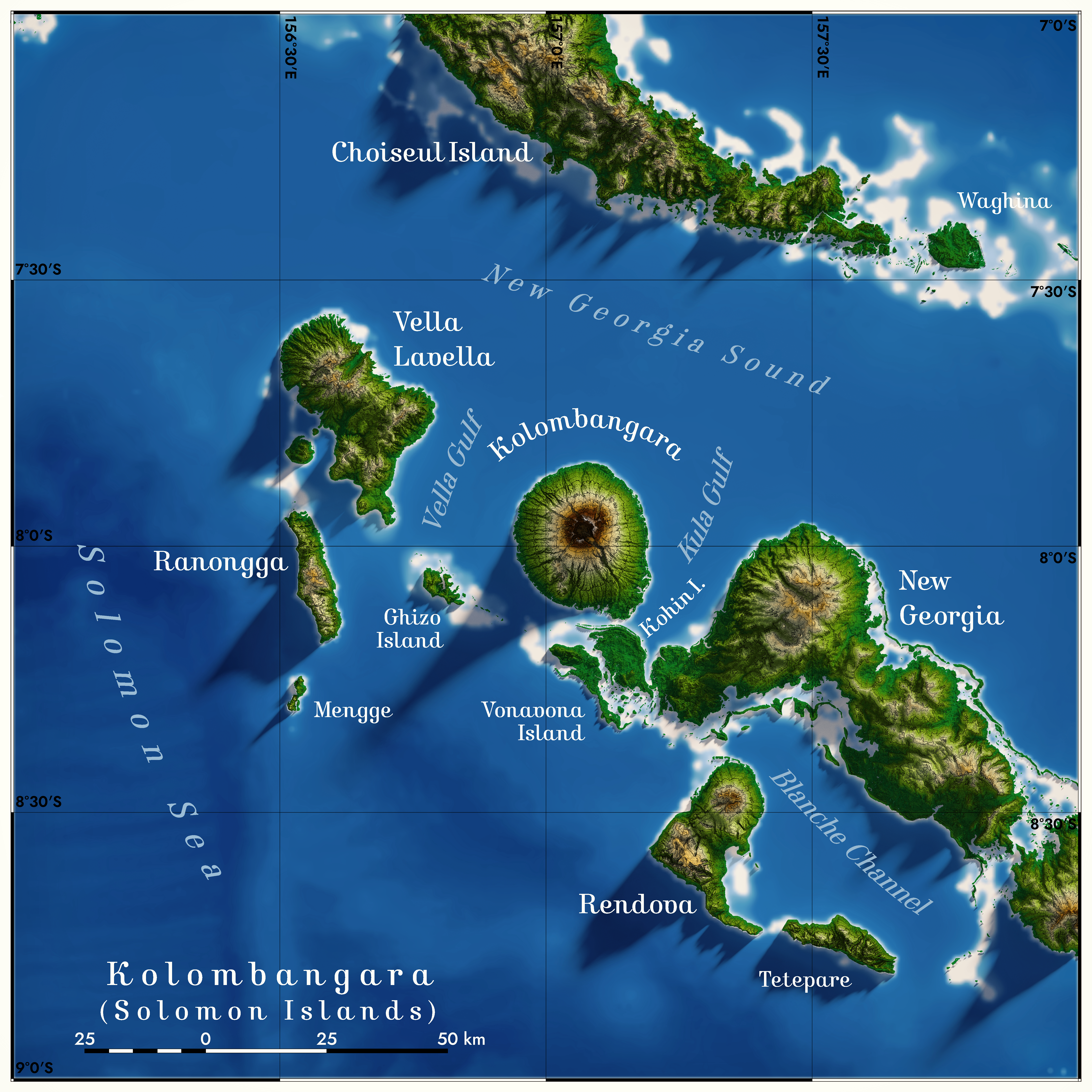
- General map of Kolombangara with neighbouring islands

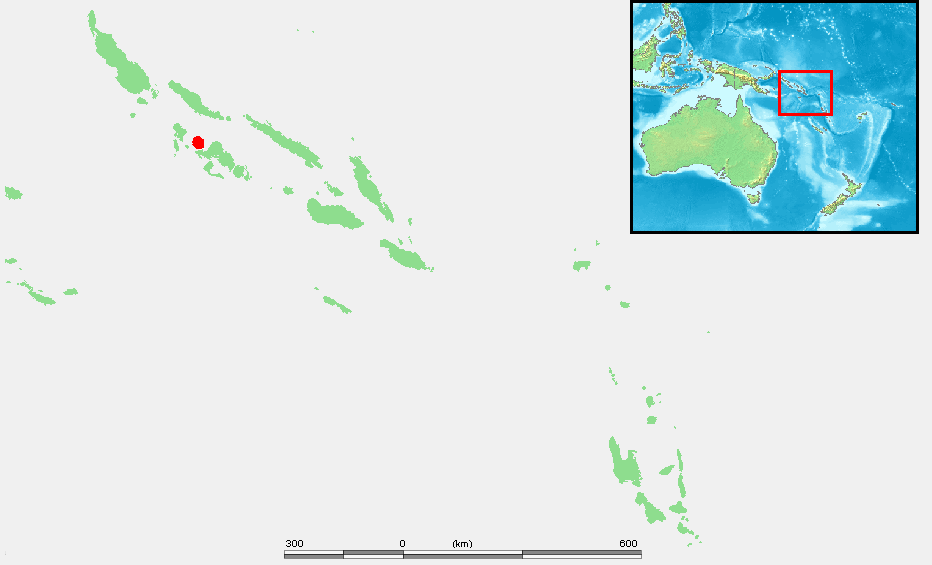

Geography
- Location: South Pacific Ocean
- Coordinates: 7°58′S 157°04′E
- Archipelago: New Georgia Islands
- Area: 687.8 km^{2} (265.6 sq mi)
- Length: 30 km (19 mi)
- Highest elevation: 1,770 m (5810 ft)
- Highest point: Mount Veve

Administration
- Solomon Islands
- Province: Western

Kolombangara (sometimes spelled Kulambangara) is an island in the New Georgia Islands group of the nation state of Solomon Islands in the southwestern Pacific Ocean. The name is from a local language, a rough translation of its meaning is "Water Lord" with approximately 80 rivers and streams running down its flanks.

== Geography ==
Almost perfectly round in shape and about 30 km (19 miles) across, the island is a stratovolcano that reaches an elevation of 1,770 metres (5,807 ft) at Mount Veve. The island forms part of the southern boundary of the New Georgia Sound; to the northwest the Vella Gulf separates it from Vella Lavella and Gizo, while to the southeast New Georgia lies across the Kula Gulf. West-southwest of Kolombangara is Ghizo Island, upon which the Western provincial capital Gizo is located. The island is heavily forested, with few inhabitants. There are two notable settlements, Ringgi and Mongga, the former being the larger. The most significant industry on the island is logging, principally based at Poitete.

== Environment ==
Two sites associated with the island have been identified by BirdLife International as Important Bird Areas (IBAs) because they support populations of threatened or restricted range bird species. The Kolombangara Upland Forest IBA comprises 30,963 ha of forested land covering the central caldera and the high ridges of Mounts Veve and Rano, with four corridors down through lowland forest to the coast. The birds include yellow-legged pigeons, crested cuckoo-doves, Mayr's swiftlets, Roviana rails, Heinroth's shearwaters, Sanford's sea eagles, Meek's lorikeets, black-faced pittas, North Melanesian cuckooshrikes, white-winged fantails, Kolombangara monarchs, Kolombangara leaf warblers and Kolombangara white-eyes. The Kolombangara Marine IBA covers some 80,000 ha of marine waters around the island, the site boundaries based on a seaward extension of 7 km from the coast, to encompass foraging and transit areas for the Heinroth's shearwaters that are believed to breed in the uplands of the island.

== History ==
The first recorded sighting of Kolombangara by western explorers was in 1568 by the Spanish explorer Álvaro de Mendaña de Neira. On March 15, 1893, Kolombangara was declared part of the British Solomon Islands protectorate. The island was occupied by the Empire of Japan in the early stages of the Pacific War.

At some point between 1902 and 1914, two-thirds of the island was declared "wasteland" by the government and so alienated, becoming state property rather than being under customary ownership.

=== World War II ===
During World War II the island and the waters around it were the scene of much fighting. The Imperial Japanese Army used an airstrip on some flat ground at Vila on the south shore of the island, and in May 1943 based several military units with over ten thousand troops garrisoned on the southeast side of the island under the command of Major General Minoru Sasaki, in an attempt to establish a defence line through the Central Solomons. Naval battles nearby included the Battle of Kula Gulf and the Battle of Kolombangara.

The most famous battle was the mission to intercept the Tokyo Express supply convoy which resulted in the ramming and explosion of USN patrol torpedo boat PT-109 commanded by John F. Kennedy. Australian coastwatcher Sub-lieutenant Arthur Reginald Evans, who manned a secret observation post at the top of the island's Mount Veve volcano, spotted the explosion. After decoding news that the explosion he had witnessed was probably from the lost PT-109 he dispatched Solomon Islanders Biuku Gasa and Eroni Kumana in a dugout canoe to look for possible survivors. Their efforts led to the subsequent discovery and rescue of John F. Kennedy and the surviving crew.

After destroyers succeeded in sinking the supply ships three nights later and isolating the garrison of 12,400 there, US forces were able to "leapfrog" Kolombangara to land on Vella Lavella to the west. The Japanese evacuated Kolombangara between September 23 and October 4, 1943.

In January 1944 a detachment of one officer and six enlisted men from the 350th Engineer General Service Regiment stationed at Munda established a vegetable farm on the abandoned Japanese airstrip at Vila. The British government assigned sixteen Solomon Island men to help with the project. With seeds acquired through the Red Cross, many vegetables were sent back to the base hospital to supplement the dehydrated meals served the recuperating veterans. The main item was watermelons.

=== Post-World War II ===
Since 1978, the island has been part of the independent state of Solomon Islands.

Beginning in 2019, the Chinese state-owned China Forestry Group Corporation expressed interest in purchasing the hardwood forestry plantation that makes up much of the island, including a port and former airstrip that could be used as a base for Chinese military assets.
