= Patricia Barry filmography =

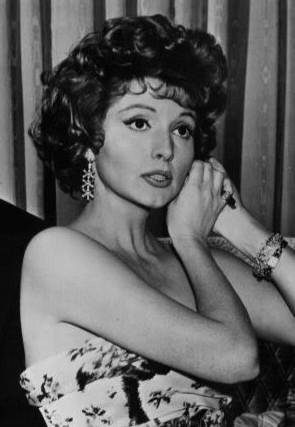
Barry as Leila from The Twilight Zone episode "The Chaser".

Patricia Barry (November 16, 1921 – October 11, 2016) was an actress best remembered for her matriarch roles in soap operas like All My Children, Days of Our Lives, and Guiding Light.

== Film and television appearances ==
- 1946: Her Kind of Man as Showgirl (uncredited)
- 1946: Two Guys from Milwaukee as Nurse (uncredited)
- 1946: Deception as Music Student (uncredited)
- 1946: The Beast with Five Fingers as Clara (as Patricia White)
- 1946: Humoresque as Fritzie - Bauer's Secretary (uncredited)
- 1947: The Man I Love as Chorine (uncredited)
- 1947: Cry Wolf as Angela (as Patricia White)
- 1947: Variety Girl as Variety Girl (uncredited)
- 1947: When a Girl's Beautiful as Ellen Trennis (Credited as Patricia White)
- 1947: Rose of Santa Rosa as Dolores de Garfias (Credited as Patricia White)
- 1948: The Wreck of the Hesperus as Deborah Allen (Credited as Patricia White)
- 1948: Trapped by Boston Blackie as Joan Howell (Credited as Patricia White)
- 1948: Flat Feat (Short) as Mary, Police Operator (Credited as Patricia White)
- 1948: Blazing Across the Pecos as Lola Carter (Credited as Patricia White)
- 1948: Singin' Spurs as Joan Dennis (Credited as Patricia White)
- 1948: Go Chase Yourself (Short) as Co-Ed (Credited as Patricia White)
- 1949: Slightly French as Hilda (uncredited)
- 1949: Riders of the Whistling Pines as Helen Carter (Credited as Patricia White)
- 1949: Manhattan Angel as Maggie Graham (Credited as Patricia White)
- 1949: The Undercover Man as Muriel Gordon (Credited as Patricia White)
- 1949: Kraft Theatre (TV Series) (Season 2 Episode 33: "Adam and Eva")
- 1950: The Tattooed Stranger as Mary Mahan (Credited as Patricia White)
- 1950: The Philco-Goodyear Television Playhouse (TV Series) (Season 2 Episode 27: "The Life of Vincent Van Gogh")
- 1950: Robert Montgomery Presents (Season 1 Episode 8: "Pitfall") (Credited as Patricia White)
- 1952: Armstrong Circle Theatre (TV Series) (Season 2 Episode 36: "The Portrait")
- 1952: Man Against Crime (TV Series) (Season 4 Episode 2: "Murder in Rhyme")
- 1953–1954: Suspense (TV Series)
  - (Season 6 Episode 10: "Laugh It Off") (1953)
  - (Season 6 Episode 26: "The Tenth Reunion") (1954)
- 1954: The Motorola Television Hour (TV Series) (Season 1 Episode 9: "The Muldoon Matter") as Polly
- 1954–1955: First Love (TV Series) (388 episodes) as Laurie James
- 1955: The Elgin Hour (TV Series) (Season 1 Episode 13: "The $1,000 Window") as Betty
- 1955–1958: Studio One in Hollywood (TV Series) (2 episodes)
  - (Season 8 Episode 3: "A Likely Story") (1955) as Ethel Cascade
  - (Season 10 Episode 26: "The Shadow of a Genius") (1958) as Deborah
- 1956–1957: Goodyear Playhouse (TV Series)
  - (Season 5 Episode 23: "Country Time Fair") (1956)
  - (Season 6 Episode 16: "Weekend on Vermont") (1957) as Grace Barre
- 1956–1957: The Alcoa Hour (TV Series) (3 episodes)
  - (Season 1 Episode 11: "Man on Fire") (1956) as Nina
  - (Season 2 Episode 1: "Flight Into Danger") (1956) as Stewardess
  - (Season 2 Episode 23: "Weekend in Vermont") (1957) as Grace Barre
- 1957–1958: Matinee Theatre (TV Series) (2 episodes)
  - (Season 2 Episode 78: "Dark Victory") (1957) as Judith Traherne
  - (Season 3 Episode 100: "The Sixty-Fifth Floor") (1958) as Sally Collier
- 1958: Playhouse 90 (TV Series) (2 episodes)
  - (Season 2 Episode 17: "Reunion") as Lucille
  - (Season 2 Episode 39: "The Great Gastby") as Jordan Baker
- 1958–1959: Maverick (TV Series) (2 episodes)
  - (Season 2 Episode 12: "Prey of the Cat") (1958) as Kitty Stillman
  - (Season 2 Episode 17: "Two Beggars on Horseback") (1959) as Jessamy Longacre
- 1958–1970: Gunsmoke (TV Series) (3 episodes)
  - (Season 3 Episode 24: "The Cabin") (1958) as Belle
  - (Season 6 Episode 5: "Shooting Stopover") (1960) as Laura Rand
  - (Season 15 Episode 20: "Albert") (1970) as Kate Schiller
- 1959: The Third Man (TV Series) (Season 1 Episode 3: "The Hollywood Incident") as Miss Page
- 1959: 77 Sunset Strip (TV Series) (Season 1 Episode 19: "Eyewitness") as Audrey King
- 1959: Sugarfoot (TV Series) (Season 2 Episode 13: "The Giant Killer") as Doreen Bradley
- 1959: Yancy Derringer (TV Series) (Season 1 Episode 23: "Thunder on the River") as Patricia Tappworth
- 1959: Westinghouse Desilu Playhouse (TV Series) (Season 1 Episode 19: "The Hard Road") as Ellie
- 1959: Richard Diamond, Private Detective (TV Series) (Season 3 Episode 17: "Family Affair") as Claire Powers
- 1959: True Story (TV Series) (Episode: "Dark Lantern") as Lorry
- 1959: Laramie (TV Series) (Season 1 Episode 5: "The Star Trail") as Evie
- 1959: Goodyear Theatre (TV Series) (Season 3 Episode 5: "The Golden Shanty") as Adie Walker
- 1959: Startime (TV Series) (Season 1 Episode 6: "The Wicked Scheme of Jebal Deeks") as Miss Calhoun
- 1959–1960: The Millionaire (TV Series) (2 episodes)
  - (Season 5 Episode 23: "The Hank Butler Story") (1959) as Judy Butler
  - (Season 6 Episode 23: "Millionaire Larry Maxwell") (1960) as Connie Norton Maxwell
- 1959–1960: The Rifleman (TV Series) (3 episodes)
  - (Season 1 Episode 30: "Three Legged Terror") (1959) as Adele Adams
  - (Season 1 Episode 32: "The Woman") (1959) as Adele Adams
  - (Season 2 Episode 24: "A Time for Singing") (1960) as Laurie Hadley
- 1959–1962: General Electric Theater (TV Series) (4 episodes)
  - (Season 7 Episode 17: "Bill Bailey Won't You Please Come Home") (1959) as Sarah Wilson
  - (Season 8 Episode 19: "They Like Me Fine") (1960) as Kathy
  - (Season 9 Episode 17: "The Devil You Say") (1961) as Geraldine Willoughby
  - (Season 10 Episode 22: "The Free Wheelers") (1962) as Monica Wheeler
- 1960: Bronco (TV Series) (Season 2 Episode 12: "Every Man a Hero") as Amy Carter
- 1960: Tales of Wells Fargo (Season 4 Episode 33: "Dealer's Choice") as Phyllis Randolph
- 1960: Markham (TV Series) (Season 1 Episode 48: "The Silken Cord") as Dr. Miriam Holloway
- 1960: Diagnosis: Unknown (TV Series) (Season 1 Episode 1: "The Case of the Radiant Wine") as Aurora Farnum
- 1960: Hong Kong (TV Series) (Season 1 Episode 11: "Nine Lives") as Maria
- 1960–1961: Bachelor Father (TV Series) (2 episodes)
  - (Season 3 Episode 30: "Bentley Meets the Perfect Woman") (1960) as Melissa Trent
  - (Season 4 Episode 24: "Bentley Swims Upstream") (1961) as Lisa Trent
- 1960–1961: Outlaws (TV Series) (2 episodes)
  - (Season 1 Episode 4: "The Rape of Red Sky") (1960) as Aimie Cutter
  - (Season 1 Episode 18: "No More Pencils - No More Books") (1961) as Laurie Palmer
- 1960–1962: My Three Sons (TV Series) (2 episodes) as Pamela MacLish
  - (Season 1 Episode 1: "Chip Off the Old Block") (1960)
  - (Season 2 Episode 17: "Second Time Around") (1962)
- 1960–1962: Thriller (TV Series) (3 episodes)
  - (Season 1 Episode 7: "The Purple Room") (1960) as Rachel Judson
  - (Season 1 Episode 31: "A Good Imagination") (1961) as Louise Chase Logan
  - (Season 2 Episode 19: "A Wig for Miss Devore") (1962) as Sheila Devore
- 1960–1963: Rawhide (TV Series) (2 episodes)
  - (Season 2 Episode 22: "Incident of the Champagne Bottles") (1960) as Susan Parker
  - (Season 5 Episode 22: "Incident of the Married Widow") (1963) as Abigail Fletcher
- 1960–1963: Perry Mason (TV Series) (3 episodes)
  - (Season 3 Episode 12: "The Case of the Frantic Flyer") (1960) as Janice Atkins
  - (Season 4 Episode 27: "The Case of the Grumbling Grandfather") (1961) as Dorine Hopkins
  - (Season 6 Episode 22: "The Case of the Velvet Claws") (1963) as Eva Belter
- 1960–1963: The Twilight Zone (TV Series) (2 episodes)
  - (Season 1 Episode 31: "The Chaser") (1960) as Leila
  - (Season 4 Episode 12: "I Dream of Genie") (1963) as Ann
- 1961: Zane Grey Theater (TV Series) (Season 5 Episode 21: "The Scar") as Beth Martin
- 1961: Michael Shayne (TV Series) (Season 1 Episode 26: "Marriage Can Be Fatal") as Laura Endicott
- 1961: The Americans (TV Series) (Season 1 Episode 14: "Long Way Back") as Jessica
- 1961: The Tall Man (TV Series) (Season 2 Episode 3: "Where is Sylvia?") as Sylvia
- 1961: The Donna Reed Show (TV Series) (Season 4 Episode 8: "All Is Forgiven") as Millie Corwin
- 1961: Ben Casey (TV Series) (Season 1 Episode 10: "The Sweetest Kiss of Madness") as Ruth Reynolds
- 1962: Route 66 (TV Series) (Season 2 Episode 20: "You Never Had It So Good") as Terry Prentiss
- 1962: Safe at Home! as Johanna Price
- 1962: Walt Disney's Wonderful World of Color (TV Series) (2 episodes) as Helen Loomis
  - (Season 9 Episode 6: "Sammy, the Way-Out Seal: Part 1")
  - (Season 9 Episode 7: "Sammy, the Way-Out Seal: Part 2")
- 1962–1965: Dr. Kildare (TV Series) (6 episodes)
  - (Season 2 Episode 1: "Gravida One") (1962) as Doris Manning
  - (Season 4 Episode 28: "The Time Buyers") (1965) as Dr. Edith Burnside
  - (Season 5 Episode 26: "From Nigeria with Love") (1965) as Lydia McGuire
  - (Season 5 Episode 27: "In the Roman Candle's Bright Glare") (1965) as Lydia McGuire
  - (Season 5 Episode 28: "When Shadows Fall") (1965) as Lydia McGuire
  - (Season 5 Episode 29: "With This Ring") (1965) as Lydia McGuire
- 1963: The Virginian (TV Series) (Season 1 Episode 17: "The Judgment") as Alice Finley
- 1963: The Eleventh Hour (TV Series) (Season 1 Episode 22: "Five Moments Out of Time") as Claudeen Lebowski
- 1963: Going My Way (TV Series) (Season 1 Episode 30: "A Tough Act to Follow") as Kathryn Fontaine
- 1963: The Alfred Hitchcock Hour (TV Series) (Season 2 Episode 10: "Good-Bye, George") as Lana Layne / Rosemary 'Peaches' Cassidy
- 1964: Destry (TV Series) (Season 1 Episode 5: "The Nicest Girl in Gomorrah") as Sarah Sprague
- 1964: The Farmer's Daughter (TV Series) (Season 1 Episode 33: "Rendezvous for Two") as Betty Ames
- 1964: The DuPont Show of the Week (TV Series) (Season 3 Episode 15: "More, More, More, More") as Alice Adams
- 1964: Send Me No Flowers as Linda
- 1964: Kitten with a Whip as Vera
- 1964: Dear Heart as Mitchell
- 1964–1965: Harris Against the World (TV Series) (Recurring role, 13 episodes) as Kate Harris
- 1965: The Alfred Hitchcock Hour (TV Series) (Season 3 Episode 23: "Completely Foolproof") as Lisa Brisson
- 1967: The Girl from U.N.C.L.E. (TV Series) (Season 1 Episode 19: "The Drublegratz Affair") as Princess Rapunzel
- 1967: The Green Hornet (TV Series) (Season 1 Episode 22: "Alias the Scarf") as Hazel Schmidt / Vina Rose
- 1967: Iron Horse (TV Series) (Season 1 Episode 29: "The Golden Web") as Helen Garth
- 1967: The Felony Squad (TV Series) (Season 2 Episode 9: "Time of Trial") as Ellen Vincent
- 1967: The High Chaparral (TV Series) (Season 1 Episode 13: "The Widow from Red Rock") as Melanie Cawthorne
- 1967: CBS Playhouse (TV Series) (Season 1 Episode 3: "Dear Friends") as Sally Lambert
- 1967: The Guns of Will Sonnett (TV Series) (Season 1 Episode 17: "The Hero") as Alice Butler
- 1967–1975: Insight (6 episodes)
  - (Episode 163: "With a Long Gray Beard") (1967) as Girl
  - (Episode 195: "He Lived with Us, He Ate with Us, What Else, Dear?") (1968) as Connie Ford
  - (Episode 333: "Prayer from the Abyss") (1971) as Mrs. Dilger
  - (Episode 342: "A Box for Mr. Lipton") (1972) as Martha Lipton
  - (Episode 359: "Truck Stop") (1973) as Bea
  - (Episode 385: "The Last of the Great Male Chauvinists") (1975) as Peggy
- 1968: Judd for the Defense (TV Series) (Season 1 Episode 22: "Kingdom of the Blind") as Kathryn Storm
- 1968: Ironside (TV Series) (Season 2 Episode 7: "I, the People") as Martha Webb
- 1969: Mannix (TV Series) (Season 2 Episode 15: "Only Giants Can Play") as Claire Hanley
- 1969: The Flying Nun (TV Series) (Season 2 Episode 15: "A Star Is Reborn") as Sabrina Lewis
- 1970: Crowhaven Farm (TV Movie) as Felicia
- 1971: Eddie (TV Movie) as Mrs. Milburn
- 1971: The Marriage of a Young Stockbroker as Dr. Sadler
- 1971: Monty Nash (TV Series) (Recurring role, 3 episodes) as Molly
  - (Season 1 Episode 10: "The Time of the Eagle") (voice)
  - (Season 1 Episode 13: "Brother Zachary") (uncredited)
  - (Season 1 Episode 14: "A Killer Among Us")
- 1971: Dead Men Tell No Tales (TV Movie) as Lisa Martin
- 1972: The Bold Ones: The Lawyers (TV Series) (Season 3 Episode 9: "The Long Morning After: Part 2") as Marian Sternwood
- 1972–1973: Days of Our Lives (TV Series) (Recurring role, 257 episodes) as Addie Horton Williams
- 1973: The Great American Beauty Contest (TV Movie) as Kay Earnshaw
- 1975: Police Woman (TV Series) (Season 1 Episode 18: "Nothing Left to Lose") as Mrs. Fontaine
- 1975: Columbo (TV Series) (Season 4 Episode 5: "Playback") as Francine
- 1976: Visions (TV Series) (Season 1 Episode 9: "Scenes from the Middle Class") as Leonore Bishop
- 1977: Charlie's Angels (TV Series) (Season 2 Episode 3: "Pretty Angels All in a Row") as Millicent Farber
- 1978: For Richer, for Poorer (TV Series) (Episode 230) as Viola Brewster
- 1978: First, You Cry as Anne
- 1979: The French Atlantic Affair (TV Mini-Series) (Recurring role, 3 episodes) as Bee
  - (Season 1 Episode 1)
  - (Season 1 Episode 2)
  - (Season 1 Episode 3)
- 1979: Three's Company (TV Series) (Season 4 Episode 14: "The Reverend Steps Out") as Mrs. Claremont
- 1980: Bogie (TV Movie) as Zelda O'Moore
- 1980: Cheaters (TV Movie)
- 1980: A Cry for Love (TV Movie) as Jennifer Harris
- 1980: Quincy M.E. (TV Series) (Season 6 Episode 4: "The Night Killer") as Dr. Hotchkiss
- 1981: The Girl on the Edge of Town (TV Movie) as Mrs. Panich
- 1981: The Texas Rangers (TV Movie) as Blanche
- 1981: All My Children (TV Series) (Recurring role, 4 episodes) as Peg English
  - (Episode 2876)
  - (Episode 2946)
  - (Episode 2979)
  - (Episode 3013)
- 1982: The End of August as Mrs. Merriman
- 1983: Twilight Zone: The Movie (segment "It's a Good Life") as Mother
- 1984: The Jerk, Too (TV Movie) as Mrs. Van Buren
- 1984: Her Life as a Man (TV Movie) as Gloria Rogers
- 1985: Evergreen (TV Mini-Series) (Season 1 Episode 1) as Mrs. Lerner
- 1985: Finder of Lost Loves (TV Series) (Season 1 Episode 20: "Surrogates") as Elaine Mailand
- 1985–1987: Guiding Light (TV Series) (Main Recurring Role, 32 episodes) as Sally 'Miss Sally' Gleason
- 1986: Simon & Simon (TV Series) (Season 6 Episode 3: "Still Phil After All These Years") as Eleanor Finley
- 1987: Nine to Five (TV Series) (Season 4 Episode 18: "Move Over Millie Maple") as Margaret
- 1988: For Keeps as Adoption Official
- 1988: Aaron's Way (TV Series) (Season 1 Episode 12: "Invisible People")
- 1989: City Rhythms as Mrs. Sullivan
- 1989: Sea of Love as Older Woman
- 1989–1994: Murder, She Wrote (TV Series) (2 episodes)
  - (Season 5 Episode 9: "Something Borrowed, Someone Blue") (1989) as Mrs. Belle Pentworth
  - (Season 11 Episode 7: "Fatal Paradise") (1994) as Melanie Venable
- 1991 Knots Landing (TV Series) (Season 12 Episode 13: "The Unknown") as Woman
- 1991: Dallas (TV Series) (Season 14 Episode 10: "Lock, Stock and Jock") as Janine
- 1991: Hunter (TV Series) (Season 7 Episode 19: "All That Glitters") as Adele Hauser
- 1992: She Woke Up (TV Movie) as Marcie Beauchamp
- 1992: Invasion of Privacy (Video) as Drama Coach
- 1992–1994: Loving (TV Series) (Recurring role, 174 episodes) as Isabella Alden
- 1993: Ghostwriter (TV Series) (Recurring role, 4 episodes) as Lana Barnes
  - (Season 1 Episode 23: "Who's Who: Part 1")
  - (Season 1 Episode 24: "Who's Who: Part 2")
  - (Season 1 Episode 25: "Who's Who: Part 3")
  - (Season 1 Episode 26: "Who's Who: Part 4")
- 2001: Providence (TV Series) (Season 4 Episode 9: "Gobble, Gobble") as Margery York-Gladwell
- 2014: Delusional as Older Annie Walton (final film role)
