= George Grizzard =

American actor (1928–2007)

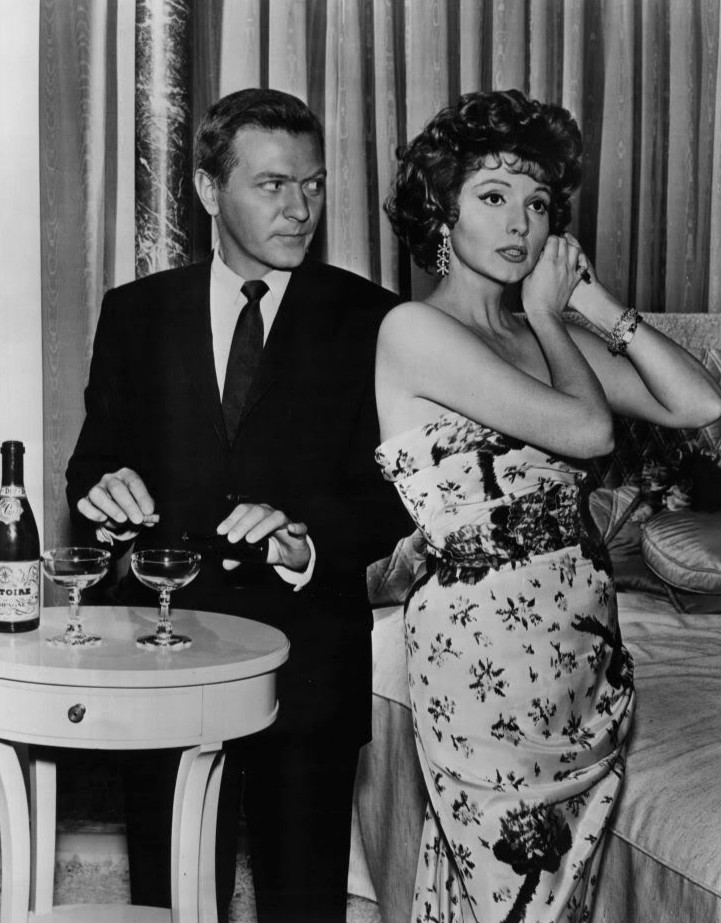
- Grizzard and Patricia Barry in the episode "The Chaser" of the television series The Twilight Zone
- Born: George Cooper Grizzard Jr. April 1, 1928; Roanoke Rapids, North Carolina, U.S.
- Died: October 2, 2007 (aged 79); Manhattan, New York City, U.S.
- Education: University of North Carolina at Chapel Hill
- Occupation: Actor
- Years active: 1955–2006
- Partner: William Tynan

George Cooper Grizzard Jr. (April 1, 1928 – October 2, 2007) was an American actor. He was the recipient of a Tony Award, a Grammy Award, and a Primetime Emmy Award, among other accolades.

== Life and career ==
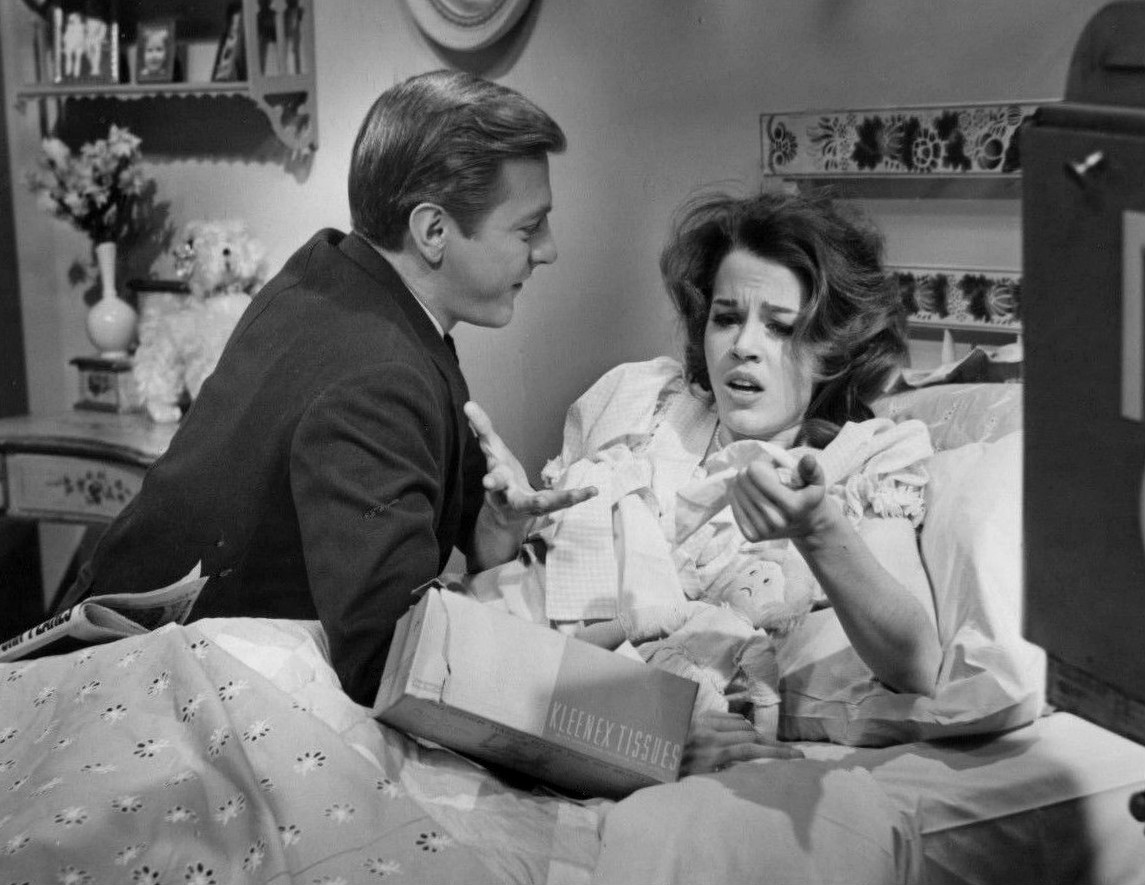
Grizzard and Jane Fonda in a 1961 presentation of W. Somerset Maugham's A String of Beads

=== Early years and education ===
Grizzard was born in Roanoke Rapids, North Carolina and raised in Washington, DC. He once told an interviewer that he was "an only child and probably very lonely, so I made up children to play with — Gene and Bounds and Mrs. Pig and Mrs. Hog and their children and a town called Scottina. It was all a child's fantasy, but I guess that just kind of developed into wanting to create people." He appeared in student productions in junior high school and decided to become an actor while attending Woodrow Wilson High School in Washington, where he was president of the drama club. He went on to the University of North Carolina at Chapel Hill, where he studied advertising and drama.

=== Career ===
He returned to Washington after graduation to work in advertising while appearing in amateur productions. He began his professional acting career in 1950 at Washington's Arena Stage, appearing in some of its earliest productions, with his first leading role in Dark of the Moon. He went to New York frequently for stage roles, and studied with Sanford Meisner, Philip Burton, and Alan Schneider.

Grizzard's stage debut was as the Miner in The Corn Is Green in 1944. He made his Broadway debut in The Desperate Hours in 1955, about jailbreakers terrorizing a family, in which he played Hank Griffith, the younger brother of a character played by Paul Newman. He frequently appeared in the plays of Edward Albee, and was in the original 1962 production of Who's Afraid of Virginia Woolf? He played Nick alongside Melinda Dillon as his wife Honey, a young couple visiting Uta Hagen and Arthur Hill as the warring spouses, Martha and George. The role won him a Grammy Award for Best Spoken Word Album along with his castmates.

Grizzard played an unscrupulous United States Senator in the film Advise and Consent in 1962. Beginning in 1963, Grizzard was a member of the original company of the Guthrie Theater in Minneapolis, which also included Jessica Tandy and Hume Cronyn. He played the title role in the Guthrie's inaugural production of Hamlet alongside Tandy, and featured in many productions from the Guthrie's first two seasons, including roles in Henry V, Three Sisters, and Saint Joan.

Grizzard also appeared on Broadway in The Disenchanted in 1958, Face of a Hero in 1960 and Big Fish, Little Fish in 1961.

His film roles included the drama From the Terrace with Paul Newman (1960), the Western Comes a Horseman with Jane Fonda (1978), and a Neil Simon comedy, Seems Like Old Times (1980).

He also appeared in the 1996 revival of A Delicate Balance and the 2005 revival of Seascape. He also starred in You Know I Can't Hear You When the Water's Running. He won the 1996 Tony Award for Best Actor in a Play for A Delicate Balance. Additional Broadway credits include The Creation of the World and Other Business, The Glass Menagerie, The Country Girl, The Royal Family, and California Suite.

His many television credits include guest-starring roles on shows such as The Twilight Zone, Alfred Hitchcock Presents, Ironside, Rawhide, Hawaii Five-O, Ben, Dr. Kildare, The Golden Girls, The Cosby Show, Murder, She Wrote and Law & Order.

Grizzard guest-starred several times during the 1990s on the NBC television drama Law & Order as defense attorney Arthur Gold. He also portrayed President John Adams in the Emmy Award winning PBS miniseries The Adams Chronicles, produced by WNET. In 1980, he won an Emmy for his work in The Oldest Living Graduate. He starred as reporter Richard Larsen in The Deliberate Stranger, a television movie about serial killer Ted Bundy.

Grizzard declined to discuss his acting technique, saying it was intensely personal, and that he "didn't think it was anybody's business." But he once said that actors needed to "have this mystery to lure an audience in order for them to do part of your work, to involve them. Don't do it all for them."

He was inducted into the American Theater Hall of Fame in 2002.

=== Death ===
Grizzard died in Manhattan of complications from lung cancer in 2007. According to his New York Times obituary, his only survivor was his partner, William Tynan.

== Filmography ==
=== Film ===
Year	Title	Role	Notes
1960	From the Terrace	Alexander "Lex" Porter	
1962	Advise & Consent	Senator Fred Van Ackerman	
1967	Warning Shot	Walt Cody	
1971	Happy Birthday, Wanda June	Dr. Norbert Woodley	
1978	Comes a Horseman	Neil Atkinson	
1979	Firepower	Leo Gelhorn	
1980	Seems Like Old Times	Governor	
1982	Wrong is Right	President Bedford Forrest "Frosty" Lockwood	
1984	Bachelor Party	Ed Thompson	
2000	Wonder Boys	Fred Leer	
2000	Small Time Crooks	George Blint	
2006	Flags of Our Fathers	Older John Bradley	Final film role

=== Television ===
Year	Title	Role	Notes
1956-1962	Alfred Hitchcock Presents	Ted Lambert; Hubert Winter; Alan Chatterton	Season 2 Episode 2: "Fog Closing In" as Ted Lambert (1956) Season 5 Episode 22: "Across the Threshold" as Hubert Winter (1960) Season 7 Episode 27: "Act of Faith" as Alan Chatterton (1962)
1960	The Millionaire	Jerry Mitchell	Season 6 Episode 21: "The Story of Jerry Mitchell"
1960	Thriller	Merle Jenkins	Season 1 Episode 1: "The Twisted Image"
1960	The Twilight Zone	Roger Shackleforth	Season 1 Episode 31: "The Chaser"
1963	The Twilight Zone	Alan Talbot / Walter Ryder, Jr.	Season 4 Episode 1: "In His Image"
1963	Espionage	Lieutenant Bridger	Season 1 Episode 10: "Festival of Pawns"
1963	Ben Casey	Jonas King	Season 3 Episode 16: "The Last Splintered Spoke of the Old Burlesque Wheel"
1964	Dr. Kildare	Douglas Martin	Season 3 Episode 24: "A Hundred Million Tomorrows"
1965	Rawhide	Captain George Ballinger	Season 7 Episode 16: "A Time for Waiting"
1971	Marcus Welby, MD	George Adams	Season 3 Episode 2: "A Portrait of Debbie"
1974	The Stranger Within	David Collins	Television movie
1975	Attack on Terror: The FBI vs. the Ku Klux Klan	Attorney Clay	Television movie
1975	The Lives of Jenny Dolan	Ralph Stantlow	Television movie
1976	The Adams Chronicles	John Adams	Television miniseries Nominated – Primetime Emmy Award for Outstanding Lead Actor in a Limited Series (1977)
1978	Hawaii 5-0	Al Marsh	Season 10 Episode 16: "Head to Head"
1980	The Oldest Living Graduate	Floyd Kincaid	Television movie Primetime Emmy Award for Outstanding Supporting Actor in a Limited Series or Movie (1981)
1982	American Playhouse	Mr. Wooster	Season 1 Episode 1: "The Shady Hill Kidnapping"
1984	Trapper John, M.D.	Vernon Shaw	Season 5 Episode 13: "Play Your Hunch"
1985	Spenser: For Hire	Frank Silverman	Season 1 Episode 3: "The Choice"
1985	The Cosby Show	Mr. Barker	Season 2 Episode 10: "Clair's Toe"
1985	Murder, She Wrote	Dr. Aubrey Benton	Season 2 Episode 11: "Murder Digs Deep"
1986	The Deliberate Stranger	Richard Larsen	Television movie
1987	Murder, She Wrote	Professor Tyler Stoneham	Season 3 Episode 14: "Murder in a Minor Key"
1988	Murder, She Wrote	Edmund Hall	Season 4 Episode 22: "The Body Politic"
1988	David	Dr. Achauer	Television Movie
1989-1990	The Golden Girls	Jamie/George Devereaux	Season 5 Episode 8: "That Old Feeling" Season 6 Episode 9: "Mrs. George Devereaux"
1990	Caroline?	Paul Carmichael	Television movie
1990	An Enemy of the People	Mayor Peter Stockman	Television movie
1991	Iran: Days of Crisis	President Jimmy Carter	Television movie
1992–2000	Law & Order	Defense Attorney Arthur Gold	Season 2 Episode 13: "Severance" (1992) Season 3 Episode 22: "Benevolence" (1993) Season 4 Episode 14: "Censure" (1994) Season 7 Episode 13: "Matrimony" (1997) Season 10 Episode 8: "Blood Money" (1999) Season 11 Episode 3: "Dissonance" (2000)
1993	American Experience	John W. Davis	Season 5 Episode 8: "Simple Justice"
1993	Alex Haley's Queen	Mr. Cherry	Television movie
1993	Not in the Family	Malcolm Worth	Television movie
1994	Scarlett	Henry Hamilton	Television miniseries Sequel to Gone With the Wind
1994	The 5 Mrs. Buchanans	Frank Collins	Season 1 Episode 10: "Emma in Love"
1997	Sisters and Other Strangers	Ben Strickland	Television movie
1997–1998	3rd Rock from the Sun	George Albright	Season 3 Episode 4: "Dick-In-Law" Season 3 Episode 20: "My Daddy's Little Girl"
1998	Touched by an Angel	Charley Nott	Season 5 Episode 11: "An Angel on the Roof"
2006	Haskett's Chance	Peyton Haskett	Television movie

=== Stage ===
Year	Title	Role	Notes
1955	The Desperate Hours	Hank Griffin	Ethel Barrymore Theatre, Broadway
1956	The Happiest Millionaire	Angier Duke	Lyceum Theatre, Broadway
1958	The Disenchanted	Shep Stearns	Coronet Theatre, Broadway
1960	Face of a Hero	Harold Rutland Jr.	Eugene O'Neill Theatre, Broadway
1961	Big Fish, Little Fish	Ronnie Johnson	Anta Theatre, Broadway
1962	Mary, Mary	Bob McKellaway (Replacement)	Helen Hayes Theater, Broadway
1962	Who's Afraid of Virginia Woolf?	Nick	Billy Rose Theatre, Broadway
1963	Hamlet	Hamlet	Guthrie Theater
1964	Henry V	Henry V	Guthrie Theater
1964	Saint Joan	Dauphin	Guthrie Theater
1964	Volpone	Mosca	Guthrie Theater
1965	The Glass Menagerie	The Son	Brooks Atkinson Theatre, Broadway
1967	The Shock of Recognition	Jack Barnstable	Ambassador Theatre
1967	I'm Herbert	Herbert	Ambassador Theatre
1967	The Footsteps of Doves	Salesman	Ambassador Theatre, Broadway
1968	Noël Coward's Sweet Potato	Performer	Ethel Barrymore Theatre, Broadway
1969	The Gingham Dog	Vincent	John Golden Theatre, Broadway
1970	Inquest	Julius Roseberg	Music Box Theatre, Broadway
1971	The Country Girl	Bernie Dodd	The Kennedy Center
1972	The Country Girl	Bernie Dodd	Billy Rose Theatre, Broadway
1972	The Creation of the World and Other Business	Lucifer	Sam S. Shubert Theatre, Broadway
1973	Crown Matrimonial	King Edward VIII	Helen Hayes Theater, Broadway
1976	California Suite	Sidney Nichols/Stu Franklyn/William Warren	Eugene O'Neill Theatre, Broadway
1978	Man and Superman	John Tanner	Circle in the Square Theatre, Broadway
1996	A Delicate Balance	Tobias	Plymouth Theatre, Broadway
1998	Show Boat	Cap'n Andy Hawks	Prince Edward Theatre
2001	Judgement at Nuremberg	Judge Haywood	Longacre Theatre, Broadway
2002	Seascape	Charlie	Booth Theatre, Broadway
2004	Cat on a Hot Tin Roof	Big Daddy	The Kennedy Center
2006	Regrets Only	Hank Hadley	Manhattan Theatre Club, Off-Broadway

== See also ==
- List of Primetime Emmy Award winners
