= Gunfighters (film) =

1947 film

- Theatrical release poster
- Directed by: George Waggner
- Screenplay by: Alan Le May
- Based on: Twin Sombreros; 1941 novel by Zane Grey
- Produced by: Harry Joe Brown
- Starring: Randolph Scott; Barbara Britton; Dorothy Hart
- Cinematography: Fred Jackman Jr.
- Edited by: Harvey Manger
- Music by: Rudy Schrager
- Color process: Cinecolor
- Production company: Producers-Actors Corporation
- Distributed by: Columbia Pictures
- Release date: July 15, 1947
- Running time: 89 minutes
- Country: United States
- Language: English

Gunfighters is a 1947 American Western film directed by George Waggner and starring Randolph Scott and Barbara Britton. Based on the novel Twin Sombreros by Zane Grey (the sequel of Knights of the Range) and with a screenplay by The Searchers author Alan Le May, the film is about a gunfighter who lays down his guns after being forced to shoot his best friend, and decides to become a cowhand on a ranch. The film was released in the United Kingdom as The Assassin.

== Plot ==
Trying to put his life as a gunfighter behind him, Brazos Kane goes off to join old pal Bob Tyrell at the Inskip ranch. As Brazos approaches the spread, he hears a gunshot and sees two people riding off. He finds his friend shot dead.

Brazos takes the body to the Banner ranch, but the ruthless Banner has him arrested for the murder by Yount, a corrupt deputy. Brazos has the bullet that killed his friend and slips it to Jane Banner, the rancher's daughter.

Inskip frees Brazos before he can be lynched. Brazos goes into town with Inskip and clears himself with the sheriff. Brazos later makes the mistake of trusting Bess, Jane's sister, with his suspicions about the murder, but she is in love with ranch foreman Bard Macky, the man who killed Tyrell.

Brazos refuses to strap on his guns, but Yount and hired gun Orcutt try to ambush him or run him off. Inskip is murdered in cold blood which is the last straw for Brazos. He arms himself and goes to town after the bad guys, wounding acting sheriff Yount (the regular sheriff is out of town on business) several times to make him talk since, as he guessed, Yount was on the Banner payroll. Johnny O'Neil, a young cowhand on the Inskip ranch, follows Brazos into town and is killed drawing the deputies away so that Brazos can get out of town. Brazos then goes to the Banner ranch, calling out Orcutt and Bard for a final showdown. After Brazos kills both of them, the sheriff shows up and tells Brazos that Banner will be indicted for murder and he wants Brazos to leave for California. As Brazos rides off, Jane joins him, no longer wanting any part in the corruption of her father and sister.

== Cast ==
- Randolph Scott as Brazos Kane
- Barbara Britton as Bess Banner
- Bruce Cabot as Bard Macky
- Charley Grapewin as Rancher Inskip
- Steven Geray as Jose aka Uncle Joe
- Forrest Tucker as Hen Orcutt
- Charles Kemper as Sheriff Kiscaden
- Grant Withers as Deputy Bill Yount
- John Miles as Johnny O'Neil
- Griff Barnett as Mr. Banner
- Dorothy Hart as Jane Banner

== Production ==
Gunfighters was filmed on location at Andy Jauregui Ranch and Monogram Ranch in Newhall, California, Vasquez Rocks Natural Area Park in Agua Dulce, California, and Sedona, Arizona.
