= John Garfield =

American actor (1913–1952)

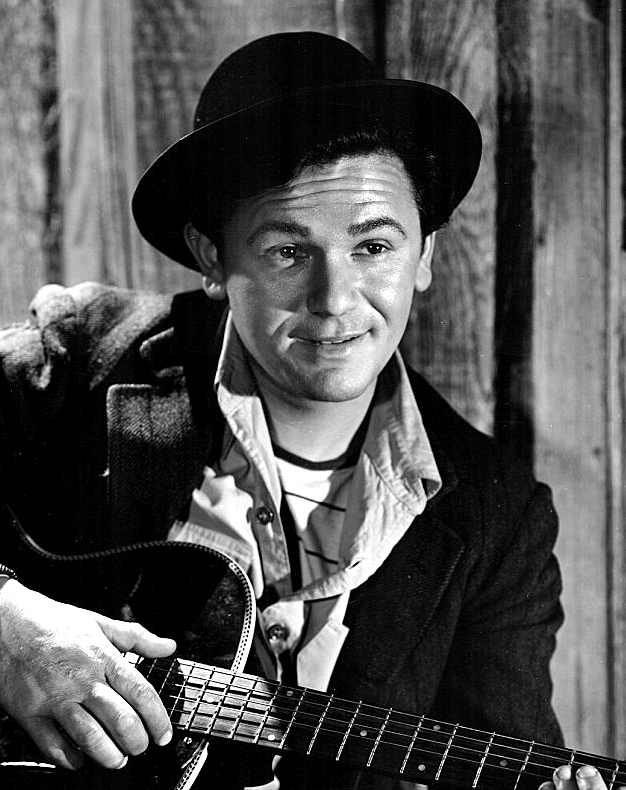
- Garfield in Tortilla Flat (1942)
- Born: Jacob Julius Garfinkle; March 4, 1913; New York City, U.S.
- Died: May 21, 1952 (aged 39); New York City, U.S.
- Resting place: Westchester Hills Cemetery
- Occupation: Actor
- Years active: 1932–1952
- Spouse: Roberta Seidman (m. 1935)
- Children: 3

John Garfield (born Jacob Julius Garfinkle; March 4, 1913 – May 21, 1952) was an American actor who played brooding, rebellious, working-class characters. He grew up in poverty in New York City. In the early 1930s, he became a member of the Group Theatre. In 1937, he moved to Hollywood, eventually becoming one of Warner Bros.' stars. He received Academy Award nominations for his performances in Four Daughters (1938) and Body and Soul (1947).

Called to testify before the U.S. House Committee on Un-American Activities (HUAC), he denied communist affiliation and refused to "name names", effectively ending his film career. Some have alleged that the stress of this persecution led to his premature death at 39 from a heart attack. Garfield is acknowledged as a predecessor of such Method actors as Marlon Brando, Montgomery Clift, and James Dean.

== Early life ==
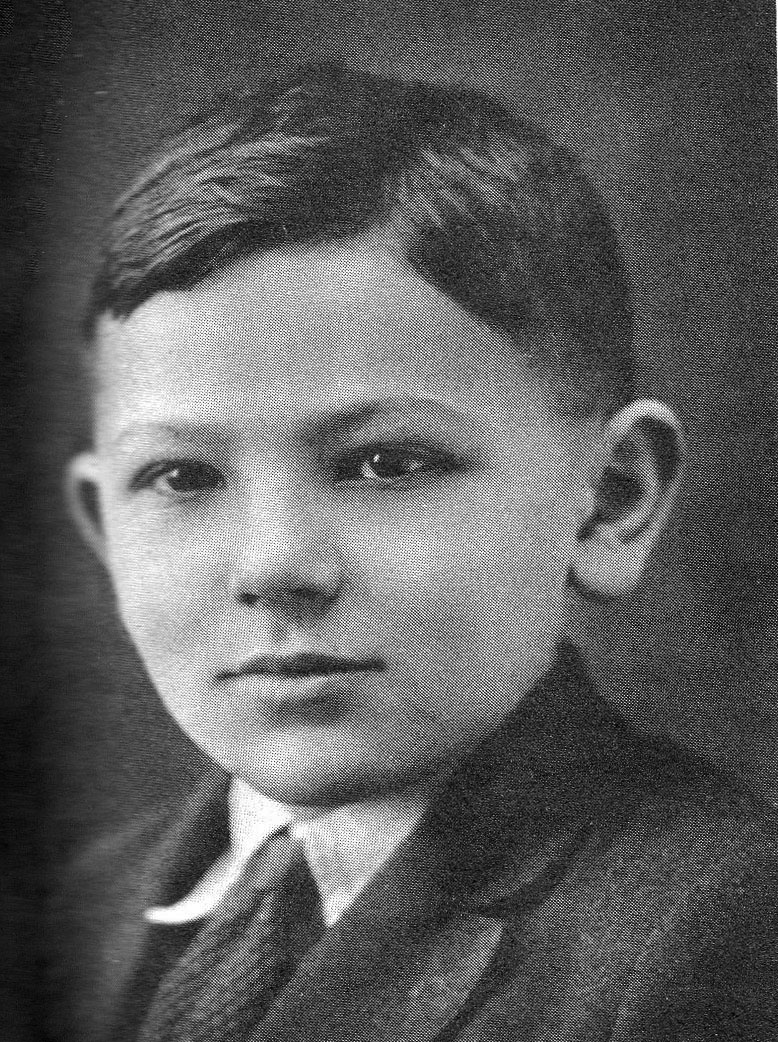
Garfield as a child

Jacob Garfinkle (Yiddish: יעקבֿ גאַרפֿינקל) was born in a small apartment on Rivington Street in Manhattan's Lower East Side, to David and Hannah Garfinkle, Russian Jewish immigrants, and grew up in the heart of the Yiddish Theater District. In infancy, a middle name—Julius—was added, and for the rest of his life those who knew him well called him Julie. His father, a clothes presser and part-time cantor, struggled to make a living and to provide even marginal comfort for his small family. When Garfield was five, his brother Max was born. Their mother never fully recovered from what was described as a "difficult" pregnancy and birth. She died two years later, and the young boys were sent to live with various relatives, all poor, scattered across the boroughs of Brooklyn, Queens and The Bronx. Several of the relatives lived in tenements in theBrownsville section of East Brooklyn, and there Garfield lived in one house and slept in another. At school, he was judged a poor reader and speller, deficits that were aggravated by irregular attendance. He would later say of his time on the streets, that he learned "all the meanness, all the toughness it's possible for kids to acquire."

"If I hadn't become an actor, I might have become Public Enemy Number One."

His father remarried and moved to the West Bronx, where Garfield joined a series of gangs. Much later, he would recall: "Every street had its own gang. That's the way it was in poor sections ... the old safety in numbers." He soon became a gang leader. At this time, people started to notice his ability to mimic well-known performers, both physically and facially. He also began to hang out and eventually spar at a boxing gym on Jerome Avenue. At some point, he contracted scarlet fever (it was diagnosed later in adulthood), causing permanent damage to his heart and causing him to miss a lot of school. After he was expelled three times and expressed a wish to quit school altogether, his father and stepmother sent him to P.S. 45, a school for difficult children. It was under the guidance of the school's principal—the educator Angelo Patri—that he was introduced to acting. Noticing Garfield's tendency to stammer, Patri assigned him to a speech therapy class taught by a charismatic teacher named Margaret O'Ryan. She gave him acting exercises and made him memorize and deliver speeches in front of the class and, as he progressed, in front of school assemblies. O'Ryan thought he had a natural talent and cast him in school plays. She encouraged him to sign up for a citywide debating competition sponsored by The New York Times. To his own surprise, he took second prize.

With Patri and O'Ryan's encouragement, he took acting lessons at a drama school that was part of The Heckscher Foundation and began to appear in their productions. At one of the latter, he received back-stage congratulations and an offer of support from the Yiddish actor Jacob Ben-Ami, who recommended him to the American Laboratory Theatre. Funded by the Theatre Guild, "the Lab" had contracted with Richard Boleslavski to stage its experimental productions and with Russian actress and expatriate Maria Ouspenskaya to supervise classes in acting. Former members of the Moscow Art Theatre, they were the first proponents of Konstantin Stanislavski's 'system' in the United States, which soon developed into what came to be known as "the Method". Garfield took morning classes and began volunteering time at the Lab after hours, auditing rehearsals, building and painting scenery, and doing crew work. He would later view this time as beginning his apprenticeship in the theater. Among the people becoming disenchanted with the Guild and turning to the Lab for a more radical, challenging environment were Stella Adler, Lee Strasberg, Franchot Tone, Cheryl Crawford and Harold Clurman. In varying degrees, all would become influential in Garfield's later career.

After a stint with Eva Le Gallienne's Civic Repertory Theater and a short period of vagrancy, involving hitchhiking, freight hopping, picking fruit, and logging in the U.S. Northwest, (Preston Sturges conceived the film Sullivan's Travels after hearing Garfield tell of his hobo adventures), Garfield made his Broadway debut in 1932 in a play called Lost Boy. It ran for only two weeks but gave Garfield something critically important for an actor struggling to break into the theater: a credit.

There is a claim that he was a patron of Polly Adler's bordello or brothel in New York.

== New York theater and the Group ==
Garfield received feature billing in his next role, that of Henry the office boy in Elmer Rice's play Counsellor-at-Law, starring Paul Muni. The play ran for three months, made an Eastern tour and returned for an unprecedented second, repeat engagement, only closing when Muni was contractually compelled to go back to Hollywood to make a film for Warners. At this point, Warners expressed an interest in Garfield and sought a screen test. He turned them down.

Garfield's former colleagues Crawford, Clurman and Strasberg had launched a new theater collective, calling it simply "the Group", and Garfield lobbied his friends hard to get in. After months of rejection, he began frequenting the inside steps of the Broadhurst Theater where the Group had its offices. Cheryl Crawford noticed him one day and greeted him warmly. Feeling encouraged, he made his request for apprenticeship. Something intangible impressed her, and she recommended him to the other directors. They made no objection.

Clifford Odets had been a close friend of Garfield from the early days in the Bronx. After Odets' one-act play Waiting for Lefty became a surprise hit, the Group announced it would mount a production of his full-length drama Awake and Sing. At the playwright's insistence, Garfield was cast as Ralph, the sensitive young son who pleads for "a chance to get to first base". The play opened in February 1935, and Garfield was singled out by critic Brooks Atkinson for having a "splendid sense of character development". Garfield's apprenticeship was officially over; he was voted full membership by the company. Odets was the man of the moment, and he claimed to the press that Garfield was his "find" and that he would soon write a play just for him. That play would turn out to be Golden Boy, but when Luther Adler was cast in the lead role instead, a disillusioned Garfield began to take a second look at the overtures being made by Hollywood.

== Warner Bros. ==
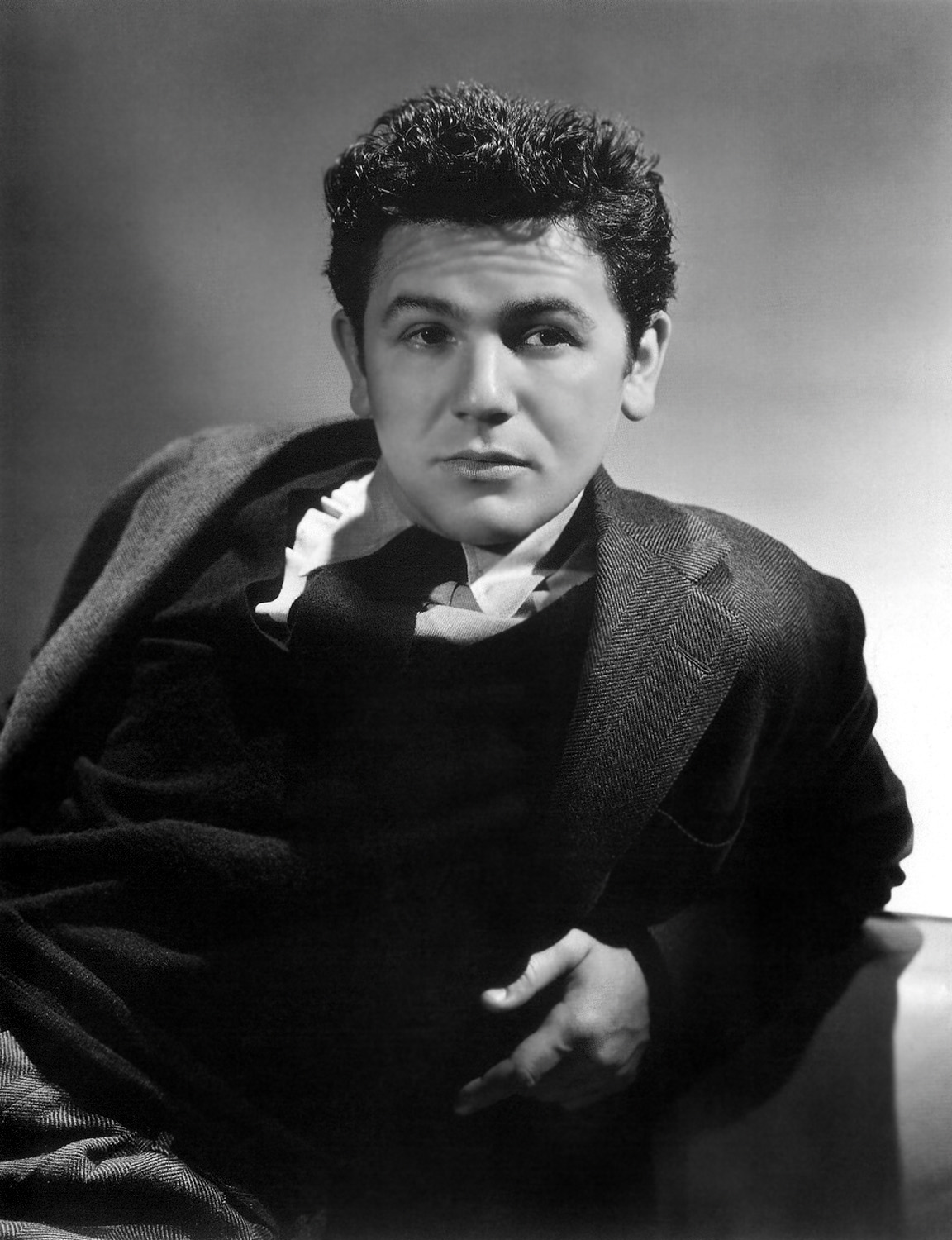
Warner Bros. publicity photo, c. 1938

Garfield had been approached by Hollywood studios before—both Paramount and Warners offering screen tests—but talks had always stalled over a clause he wanted inserted in his contract, one that would allow him time off for stage work. Now Warner Bros. acceded to his demand, and Garfield signed a standard feature-player agreement—seven years with options—in Warners' New York office. Many in the Group were livid over what they considered his betrayal. Elia Kazan's reaction was different, suggesting that the Group did not so much fear that Garfield would fail, but that he would succeed. Jack Warner's first order of business was a change of name to John Garfield.

After many false starts, he was finally cast in a supporting, yet crucial role as a tragic young composer in a Michael Curtiz film titled Four Daughters (1938). After the picture's release, he received very positive notices and a nomination for the Academy Award for Best Supporting Actor. The studio quickly revised Garfield's contract—designating him a star player rather than a featured one—for seven years without options. They also created a name-above-the-title vehicle for him titled They Made Me a Criminal (1939). Before the success of Daughters, Garfield had made a B movie feature called Blackwell's Island (also 1939). Not wanting their new star to appear in a low-budget film, Warners ordered an A movie upgrade by adding $100,000 to its budget and recalling director Michael Curtiz to shoot newly scripted scenes.

Garfield's debut had a cinematic impact difficult to conceive in retrospect. As biographer Lawrence Swindell put it:

Garfield's work was spontaneous, non-actory; it had abandon. He didn't recite dialogue, he attacked it until it lost the quality of talk and took on the nature of speech ... Like Cagney, he was an exceptionally mobile performer from the start of his screen career. These traits were orchestrated with his physical appearance to create a screen persona innately powerful in the sexual sense. What Warners saw immediately was that Garfield's impact was felt by both sexes. This was almost unique.

His "honeymoon" with Warners over, Garfield entered a protracted period of conflict with the studio, with Warners attempting to cast him in crowd-pleasing melodramas such as Dust Be My Destiny (also 1939) and Garfield insisting on quality scripts that would offer challenges and highlight his versatility. The result was often a series of suspensions, with Garfield refusing an assigned role and Warners refusing to pay him. Garfield's problem was shared by any actor working in the studio system of the 1930s: by contract, the studio had the right to cast him in any project they wanted to. But, as Robert Nott explains:

To be fair, most of the studios had a team of producers, directors, and writers who could pinpoint a particular star's strengths and worked to capitalize on those strengths in terms of finding vehicles that would appeal to the public—and hence make the studio money. The forces that prevented him from getting high quality roles were really the result of the combined willpower of the Warner Bros., the studio system in general, and the general public, which also had its own perception of how Garfield (or Cagney or Bogart for that matter) should appear on screen.

A notable exception to this trend was Daughters Courageous (also 1939), a not-quite-sequel (same cast, different story and characters) to his debut film. The film did well critically, but failed to find an audience, the public being dissatisfied that it was not a true sequel (hard to pull off, since the original character Mickey Borden died in the first picture). The director, Curtiz, called the film "my obscure masterpiece".

At the onset of World War II, Garfield immediately attempted to enlist in the armed forces, but was turned down because of his heart condition. Frustrated, he turned his energies to supporting the war effort. He and actress Bette Davis were the driving forces behind the opening of the Hollywood Canteen, a club offering food and entertainment for American servicemen. He traveled overseas to help entertain the troops, made several bond selling tours and starred in a string of patriotic box-office successes including Air Force, Destination Tokyo (both 1943) and Pride of the Marines (1945). He was particularly proud of the last film, based on the life of Al Schmid, a war hero blinded in combat. In preparing for the role, Garfield lived for several weeks with Schmid and his wife in Philadelphia and would blindfold himself for hours at a time.

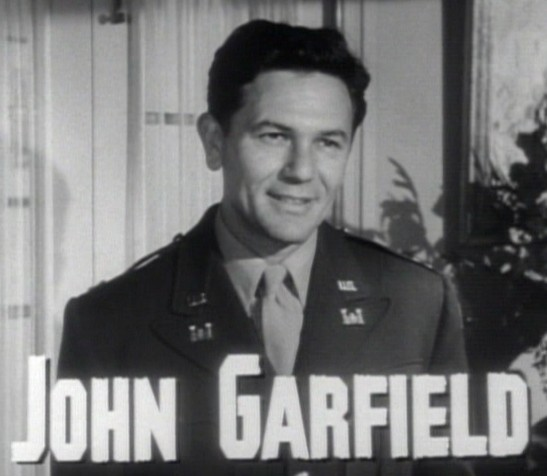
Gentleman's Agreement (1947)

After the war, Garfield starred in a series of successful films such as The Postman Always Rings Twice (1946) with Lana Turner, Humoresque (also 1946) with Joan Crawford, and Gentleman's Agreement (1947), which was nominated for Best Picture by the Academy. In Gentleman's Agreement, Garfield took a featured, but supporting, part because he believed deeply in the film's exposé of antisemitism in America. He was nominated for the Academy Award for Best Actor for his starring role in Body and Soul (1947). That same year, Garfield returned to Broadway in the play Skipper Next to God. Strong-willed and often verbally combative, Garfield did not hesitate to venture out on his own when the opportunity arose. In 1946, when his contract with Warner Bros. expired, Garfield decided not to renew it and opted to start his own independent production company.

In 1949, he would again star in a Clifford Odets play, The Big Knife.

== Politics ==
"I have nothing to hide and nothing to be ashamed of. My life is an open book. I am no Red. I am no 'pink.' I am no fellow traveler. I am a Democrat by politics, a liberal by inclination, and a loyal citizen of this country by every act of my life."

— from his statement read before the HUAC

Long involved in liberal politics, Garfield supported the Committee for the First Amendment, which opposed governmental investigation of communist activity in Hollywood. When called to testify in 1951 before the House Committee on Un-American Activities, Garfield declined to name Communist Party members or followers, testifying that he knew none in the film industry. Garfield claimed to reject communism and, just prior to his death in an effort to redeem himself, wrote that he had been duped by communist ideology in an unpublished article titled "I Was a Sucker for a Left Hook", a reference to Garfield's boxing films. However, his forced testimony before the committee had severely damaged his reputation. He was listed in Red Channels and allegedly barred from future employment by Hollywood studio bosses for the remainder of his career.

With film work scarce, Garfield returned to Broadway and starred in a 1952 revival of Golden Boy, finally cast in the lead role that had been denied to him years before.

Near the end of his life, in an effort to clear his name, Garfield drafted an article for Look magazine in which he would denounce communism without providing names. His lawyer advised him to concede he had been duped into contributing time and money to communist front groups. Garfield met with the FBI to press his case, but at the meeting, the FBI showed him a dossier on his wife Roberta (known as "Robbe"), which included her old Communist Party membership card and canceled checks to events sponsored by the party. The FBI offered to clear him if he would sign a statement asserting that his wife was a communist. Garfield responded with an angry expletive and left the meeting. Writer-director Abraham Polonsky, who worked with Garfield on two films, stated that Garfield "defended his street boy's honor and they killed him for it."

== Personal life ==
Garfield married Roberta Seidman in February 1935. She had been a member of the Communist Party. They had three children: Katherine Garfield (1938 – March 18, 1945) who died of an allergic reaction, David Patton Garfield who became an actor and later a film editor, and Julie Garfield (born 1946) who became an actress.

In 1954, his widow Roberta married motion picture and labor lawyer Sidney Cohn, who died in 1991; Roberta died in a Los Angeles nursing home in 2004. At the time of Roberta's death, Julie Garfield told the Los Angeles Times that her mother was embittered over Garfield's treatment by studio executives, who she believed, "had used Garfield as a scapegoat to take attention from others in Hollywood because he had 'formed his own production company and they felt threatened by him.'"

== Death ==
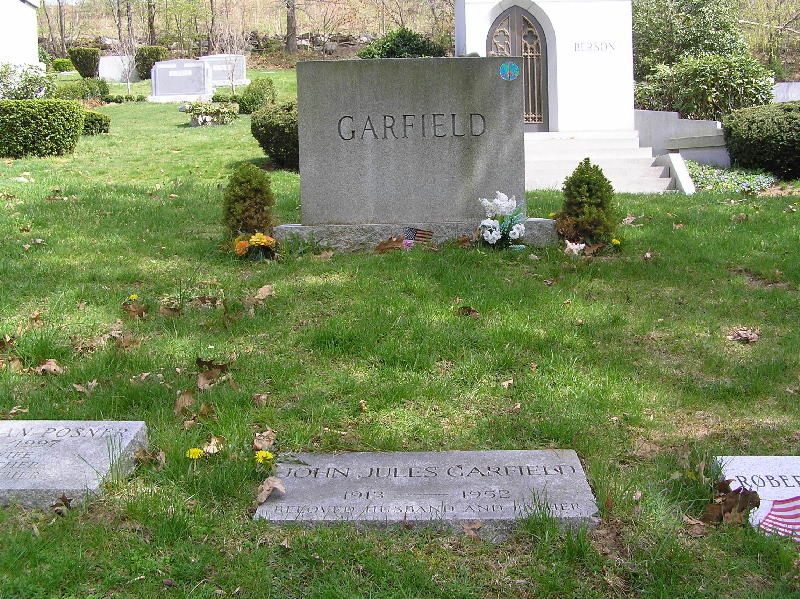
John Garfield's grave in Westchester Hills Cemetery

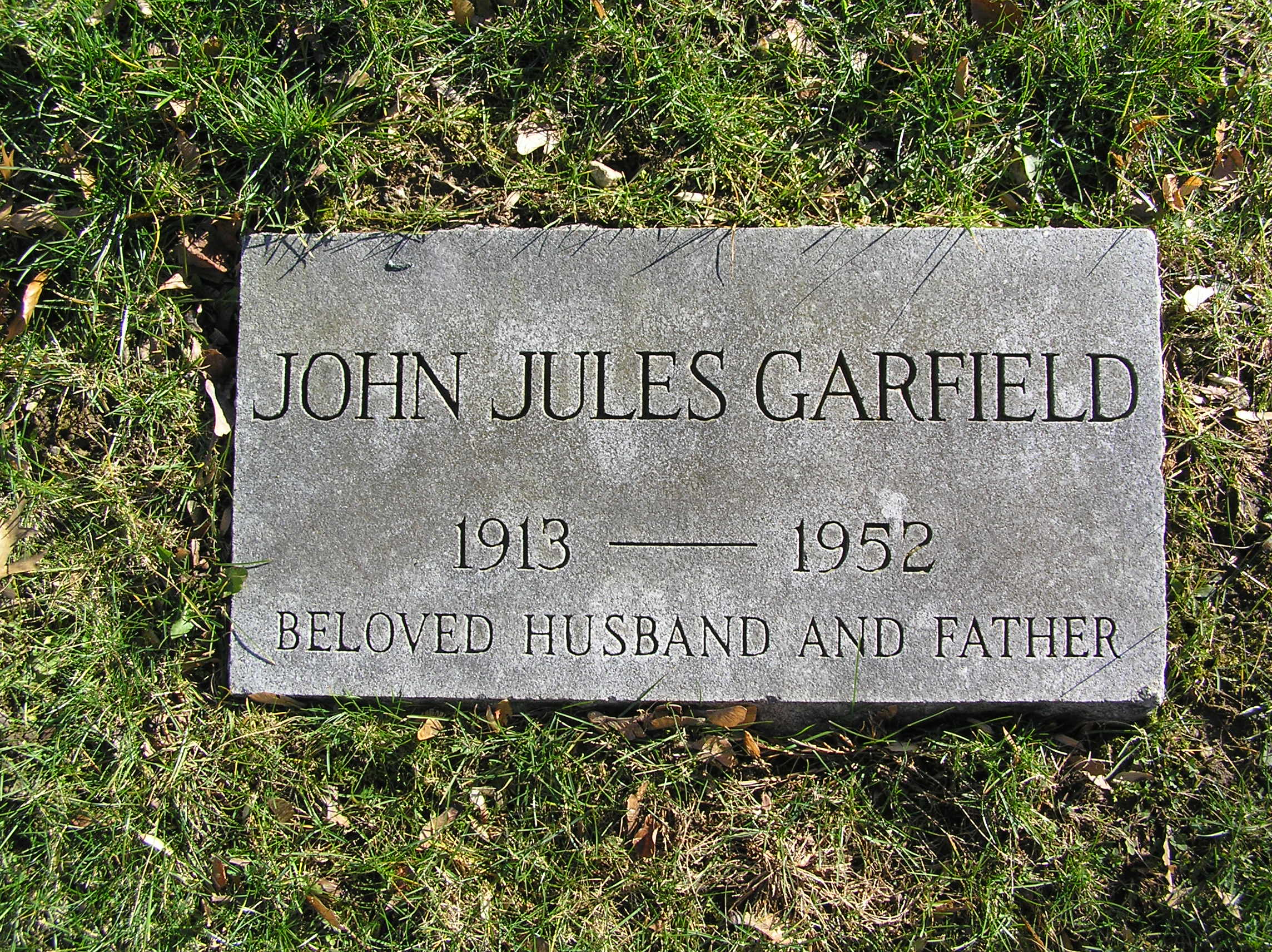
John Garfield's footstone

On May 9, 1952, Garfield moved out of his New York apartment for the last time, indicating to friends that the separation from his wife Robbe was not temporary. He confided to columnist Earl Wilson that he would soon be divorced. Close friends speculated that it was his wife's opposition to his planned confession in Look magazine that triggered the separation. He heard that a HUAC investigator was reviewing his testimony for possible perjury charges. His agent reported that Twentieth Century-Fox wanted him for a film titled Taxi but would not begin talks unless the investigation concluded in his favor.

On the morning of May 20, Garfield, against his doctor's strict orders, played several strenuous sets of tennis with a friend, mentioning that he had not slept well the night before. He met actress Iris Whitney for dinner and afterward became ill, complaining that he felt chills. She took him to her apartment, where he refused to allow her to phone a doctor and instead went to bed. The next morning, she found him dead. Long-term heart problems, which some believed to have been aggravated by the stress of the congressional inquiry, had caused his death at the age of 39.

Garfield's funeral was the largest in New York since that of Rudolph Valentino, with more than 10,000 crowding the streets outside. The media coverage of Garfield's death led to a running joke, "John Garfield Still Dead Syndrome", that parodied the phenomenon; it would later inspire "Generalissimo Francisco Franco is still dead" in the 1970s after Francisco Franco's protracted terminal illness. Garfield's estate, valued at more than $100,000, was left entirely to his wife. Shortly afterward, the HUAC closed its investigation of Garfield, leaving him in the clear. He was interred at Westchester Hills Cemetery in Hastings-on-Hudson, Westchester County, New York.

== Filmography ==
=== Feature films ===
Year	Title	Role	Director	Notes
1938	Four Daughters	Mickey Borden	Michael Curtiz	Film debut Nominated—Academy Award for Best Supporting Actor; Nominated—New York Film Critics Circle Award for Best Actor
1939	They Made Me a Criminal	Johnnie Bradfield	Busby Berkeley	
1939	Blackwell's Island	Tim Haydon	William C. McGann	
1939	Juarez	Porfirio Díaz	William Dieterle	
1939	Daughters Courageous	Gabriel Lopez	Michael Curtiz	
1939	Dust Be My Destiny	Joe Bell	Lewis Seiler	
1939	Four Wives	Mickey Borden	Michael Curtiz	
1940	Castle on the Hudson	Tommy Gordon	Anatole Litvak	Alternate title: Years Without Days
1940	Saturday's Children	Rims Rosson	Vincent Sherman	
1940	Flowing Gold	John Alexander / Johnny Blake	Alfred E. Green	
1940	East of the River	Joseph Enrico "Joe" Lorenzo	Alfred E. Green	
1941	The Sea Wolf	George Leach	Michael Curtiz	
1941	Out of the Fog	Harold Goff	Anatole Litvak	
1941	Dangerously They Live	Dr. Michael "Mike" Lewis	Robert Florey	
1942	Tortilla Flat	Daniel "Danny" Alvarez	Victor Fleming	
1943	Air Force	Sgt. Joe Winocki, Aerial Gunner	Howard Hawks	
1943	The Fallen Sparrow	John "Kit" McKittrick	Richard Wallace	
1943	Thank Your Lucky Stars	Himself (cameo)	David Butler	
1943	Destination Tokyo	Wolf	Delmer Daves	
1944	Between Two Worlds	Tom Prior	Edward A. Blatt	
1944	Hollywood Canteen	Himself (cameo)	Delmer Daves	
1945	Pride of the Marines	Al Schmid	Delmer Daves	
1946	The Postman Always Rings Twice	Frank Chambers	Tay Garnett	
1946	Nobody Lives Forever	Nick Blake	Jean Negulesco	
1946	Humoresque	Paul Boray	Jean Negulesco	
1947	Body and Soul	Charley Davis	Robert Rossen	Nominated—Academy Award for Best Actor; Nominated—New York Film Critics Circle Award for Best Actor
1947	Gentleman's Agreement	Dave Goldman	Elia Kazan	
1947	Daisy Kenyon	Himself (cameo)	Otto Preminger	Uncredited
1948	Difficult Years	Narrator (American version)	Luigi Zampa	Originally titled Anni difficili
1948	Force of Evil	Joe Morse	Abraham Polonsky	
1949	Jigsaw	Loafer with Newspaper (cameo)	Fletcher Markle	Uncredited
1949	We Were Strangers	Tony Fenner	John Huston	
1950	Under My Skin	Dan Butler	Jean Negulesco	
1950	The Breaking Point	Harry Morgan	Michael Curtiz	
1951	He Ran All the Way	Nick Robey	John Berry	Final film role

=== Short subjects ===
- Swingtime in the Movies (1938)
- Meet the Stars #1: Chinese Garden Festival (1940)
- Show Business at War (1943)
- Screen Snapshots: The Skolsky Party (1946)
- Screen Snapshots: Out of This World Series (1947)

=== Documentary ===
- The John Garfield Story (2003) (available on Warner Home Video's 2004 DVD of The Postman Always Rings Twice)

== Radio Appearances ==
Date	Program	Episode	Ref.
April 14, 1941	Lux Radio Theatre	"Dust Be My Destiny"	
May 10, 1943	The Front Line Theater	Johnny Eager	
December 28, 1943	Burns and Allen	"John Garfield The Gangster"	
May 19, 1946	Theatre Guild on the Air	"They Knew What They Wanted"	
1946	Academy Award	"Blood on the Sun"	
1947	Screen Guild Players	"Saturday's Children"	
1948	Suspense	"Death Sentence"	

== Awards and nominations ==
Year	Award	Category	Nominated work	Result	Ref.
1938	Academy Awards	Best Supporting Actor	Four Daughters	Nominated	
1947	Academy Awards	Best Actor	Body and Soul	Nominated	
1938	National Board of Review Awards	Best Acting	Four Daughters	Won	
1938	New York Film Critics Circle Awards	Best Actor	Four Daughters	Nominated	
1947	New York Film Critics Circle Awards	Best Actor	Body and Soul	Nominated	

- He was given a star on the Hollywood Walk of Fame at 7065 Hollywood Boulevard.

== Cultural references ==
- In The Exorcist (1973), Detective Kinderman says Father Damien Karras "looks like a boxer", and more specifically John Garfield as he appeared in Body and Soul.
- In the film Hustle (1975), Burt Reynolds' character references Garfield during a discussion of screen heroes.
- In the film Indecent Proposal (1993), when discussing the contract for one night with his wife, there is a "John Garfield" clause in the contract stating he pays even if he dies during the event.
- The John Prine song "The Late John Garfield Blues" (ca. 1997) is inspired by Garfield. The actor is also mentioned by Prine in "Picture Show", a song in the musician's Grammy Award-winning album The Missing Years.
- Garfield is a character in Names (1997), Mark Kemble's play about former Group Theatre members' struggles with the House Un-American Activities Committee.
- The protagonist in Thomas Pynchon's novel Inherent Vice (pub. 2009), Larry "Doc" Sportello, discusses Garfield's film appearances throughout the detective story.
- The narrator of Philip Roth's Portnoy's Complaint (pub. 1969), Alexander Portnoy at one point notes his cousin Harold's strong resemblance to Garfield.
