= Battle of the Tenaru =

1942 World War II battle

Coordinates: 9°25′46″S 160°04′59″E

- Part of the Pacific Theater of World War II
- Japanese soldiers, killed while assaulting US positions, lie dead on the sandbar at the mouth of Alligator Creek. These troops most likely belong to the ad-hoc unit of volunteers who survived the previous attacks, christened as the 'Sea Riding Unit', ordered to attempt to outflank the US positions by wading through the ocean at about 05:30.
Date	21 August 1942
Location	Guadalcanal in the Solomon Islands
Result	Allied victory

Belligerents
United States; United Kingdom; British Solomon Islands	Japan

Commanders and leaders
(United States) Alexander Vandegrift; (United States) Clifton B. Cates	(Empire of Japan) Harukichi Hyakutake; (Empire of Japan) Kiyonao Ichiki

Units involved
1st Marine Regiment	28th Infantry Regiment: Ichiki Detachment

Strength
3,000; 4 tanks	917; c. 800 in the attacking force

Casualties and losses
41–44 killed; 71 wounded	c. 774–800 killed; 15 captured

The Battle of the Tenaru, sometimes called the Battle of the Ilu River or the Battle of Alligator Creek, was a land battle between the Imperial Japanese Army and Allied ground forces that took place on 21 August 1942, on the island of Guadalcanal during the Pacific campaign of World War II. The battle was the first major Japanese land offensive during the Guadalcanal campaign.

In the battle, U.S. Marines, under the overall command of U.S. Major General Alexander Vandegrift, repulsed an assault by the "First Element" of the "Ichiki" Regiment, under the command of Japanese Colonel Kiyonao Ichiki. The Marines were defending the Lunga perimeter that guarded Henderson Field which had been captured by the Allies in landings on Guadalcanal on 7 August. Ichiki's unit was sent to Guadalcanal in response to the Allied landings there with the mission of recapturing the airfield and driving the Allied forces off the island.

Underestimating the strength of Allied forces on Guadalcanal, which at the time numbered about 11,000 personnel, Ichiki's 900-man unit conducted a nighttime frontal assault on Marine positions at Alligator Creek on the east side of the Lunga perimeter. Jacob Vouza, a Coastwatcher scout, warned the Americans of the impending attack minutes before Ichiki's assault. The Japanese were defeated with heavy losses. The Marines counterattacked Ichiki's surviving troops after daybreak, killing many more. About 800 of the original 917 of the Ichiki Regiment's First Element died.

The battle was the first of three separate major land offensives by the Japanese in the Guadalcanal campaign. The Japanese realized after Tenaru that Allied forces on Guadalcanal were much greater in number than originally estimated and subsequently sent larger forces to the island in their attempts to retake Henderson Field.

== Background ==
During the Pacific campaign of World War II, on 7 August 1942, U.S. forces landed on Guadalcanal, Tulagi, and Florida Islands in the Solomon Islands. The landings on the islands were meant to deny their use by the Japanese as bases for threatening the supply routes between the U.S. and Australia, and to secure the islands as starting points for a campaign with the eventual goal of isolating the major Japanese base at Rabaul while also supporting the Allied New Guinea campaign. The landings initiated the six-month-long Guadalcanal campaign.

Taking the Japanese by surprise, the Allied landing forces accomplished their initial objectives of securing Tulagi and nearby small islands, as well as an airfield then under construction at Lunga Point on Guadalcanal, by nightfall on 8 August. That night, as the transports unloaded, the Allied warships screening the transports were surprised and defeated by an Imperial fleet of seven cruisers and one destroyer, commanded by Japanese Vice Admiral Gunichi Mikawa. One Australian and three U.S. cruisers were sunk and one other U.S. cruiser and two destroyers were damaged in the Battle of Savo Island. Rear Admiral Richmond K. Turner withdrew all remaining Allied naval forces by the evening of 9 August without unloading all the heavy equipment, provisions, and troops from the transports, although most of the divisional artillery was landed, comprising thirty-two 75 mm and 105 mm howitzers. Only five days' rations were landed.

The Marines ashore on Guadalcanal initially concentrated on forming a defense perimeter around the airfield, moving the landed supplies within the perimeter, and completing construction of the airfield. Major General Alexander Vandegrift placed his 11,000 troops on Guadalcanal in a loose perimeter around the Lunga Point area. In four days of intense effort, the supplies were moved from the landing beach into dispersed dumps within the perimeter. Work began on completing the airfield immediately, mainly using captured Japanese gear. On 12 August, the airfield was named Henderson Field after Major Lofton Henderson, a Marine aviator who had been killed at the Battle of Midway. Captured Japanese stock increased the total supply of food to 14 days' worth. To conserve the limited food supplies, the Allied troops were limited to two meals per day.

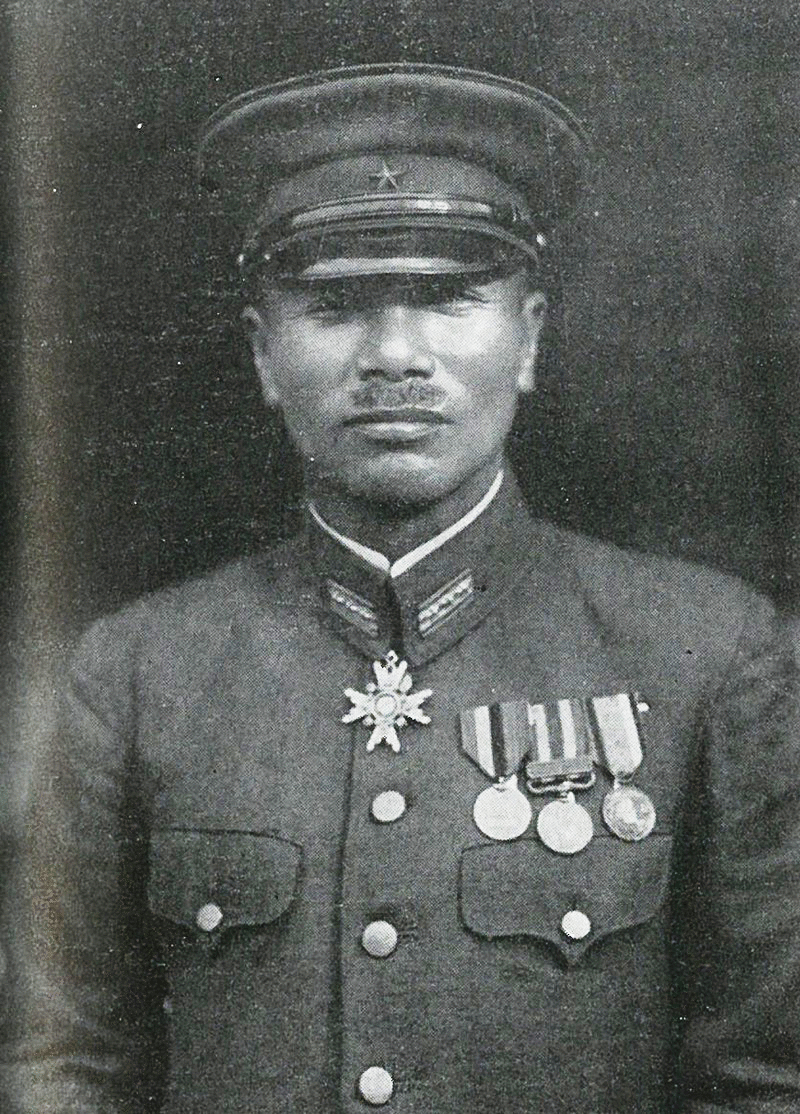
Japanese Colonel Kiyonao Ichiki, commander of the 28th Infantry Regiment

In response to the Allied landings on Guadalcanal, the Japanese Imperial General Headquarters assigned the Imperial Japanese Army's 17th Army, a corps-sized command based at Rabaul and under the command of Lieutenant-General Harukichi Hyakutake, with the task of retaking Guadalcanal from Allied forces. The 17th Army, then heavily involved with the Japanese campaign in New Guinea, had only a few units available to send to the southern Solomons area. Of these units, the 35th Infantry Brigade under Major General Kiyotake Kawaguchi was at Palau, the 4th (Aoba) Infantry Regiment under Major General Yumio Nasu was in the Philippines, and the 28th (Ichiki) Infantry Regiment, under the command of Colonel Kiyonao Ichiki, was at sea en route to Japan from Guam. The different units began to move towards Guadalcanal immediately, but Ichiki's regiment, being the closest, arrived first.

An aerial reconnaissance of the U.S. Marine positions on Guadalcanal on 12 August by one of the senior Japanese staff officers from Rabaul sighted few U.S. troops in the open and no large ships in the waters nearby, convincing Imperial Headquarters that the Allies had withdrawn the majority of their troops. In fact, none of the Allied troops had been withdrawn. Hyakutake issued orders for an advance unit of 900 troops from Ichiki's regiment to be landed on Guadalcanal by fast warship to immediately attack the Allied position and reoccupy the airfield area at Lunga Point. The remaining personnel in Ichiki's regiment would be delivered to Guadalcanal by slower transport later. At the major Japanese naval base at Truk, which was the staging point for delivery of Ichiki's regiment to Guadalcanal, Colonel Ichiki was briefed that 2,000–10,000 U.S. troops were holding the Guadalcanal beachhead and that he should "avoid frontal attacks."

Ichiki, together with 916 of his regiment's 2,300 troops, designated the "First Element" and carrying seven days' supply of food, were delivered to Taivu Point, about 35 kilometers (22 mi) east of Lunga Point, by six destroyers at 01:00 on 19 August. Ichiki was ordered to scout the American positions and wait for the remainder of his force to arrive. Known as the Ichiki Butai (Ichiki Detachment), they were an elite and battle-seasoned force but as was about to be discovered, they were heavily stricken with "victory disease" – overconfidence due to previous success. Ichiki was so confident in the superiority of his men that he decided to destroy the American defenders before the remaining majority of his force arrived, even writing in his journal "18 August, landing; 20 August, march by night and battle; 21 August, enjoyment of the fruit of victory." He concocted a brazenly simple plan: march straight down the beach and through the American defenses. Leaving about 100 personnel behind as a rear guard, Ichiki marched west with the remaining 800 men of his unit and made camp before dawn about 14 kilometers (8.7 mi) east of the Lunga perimeter. The U.S. Marines at Lunga Point received intelligence that a Japanese landing had occurred and took steps to find out exactly what was happening.

Disposition and constituents of the Ichiki detachment are as follows;

- Detachment Headquarters - 164 men
- Battalion HQ (2nd Battalion, 28th infantry) - 23 men
- 1st, 2nd, 3rd and 4th companies - 420 men (105 men each)
- Machinegun company (8 heavy machineguns) - 110 men
- Battalion Heavy Gun Platoon - 50 men, two 70mm battalion guns
- Engineer Company (1st Co., 7th Engineer Construction Regiment) - 150 men

== Prelude ==
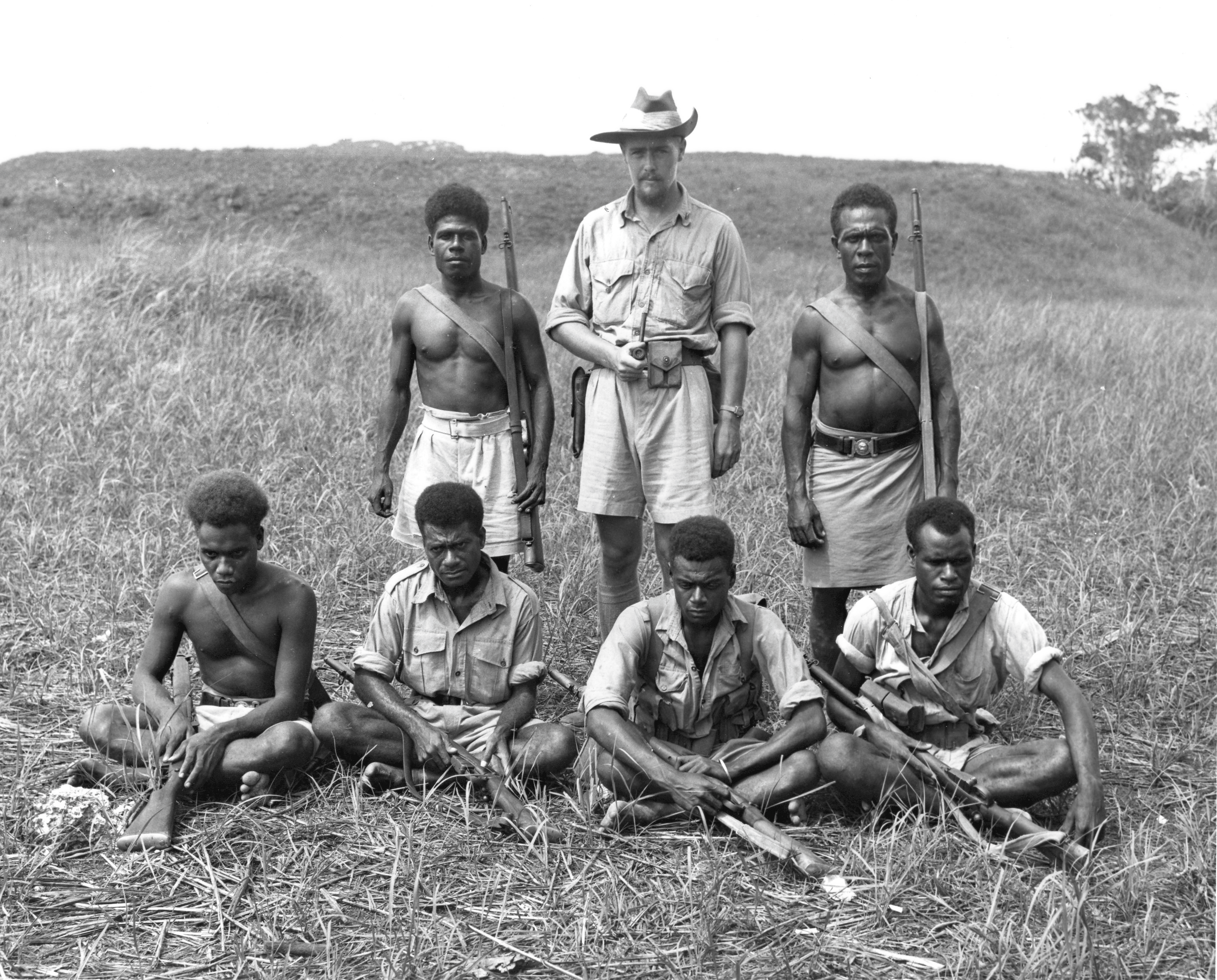
British Solomon Islands Protectorate district officer and coastwatcher Martin Clemens (center standing) with members of the British Solomon Islands Protectorate Defence Force, who served as scouts and guides for Allied forces throughout the Guadalcanal campaign.

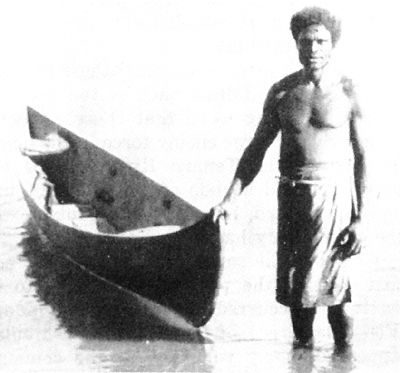
Sir Jacob Vouza was tortured and left for dead by his Japanese captors only to escape and then warn the Marines of the imminent surprise attack minutes before the Japanese assault.

Reports from patrols of Solomon Islanders, including retired Sergeant Major Jacob C. Vouza of the British Solomon Islands Protectorate Constabulary, under the direction of Martin Clemens, a coastwatcher and officer in the British Solomon Islands Protectorate Defence Force (BSIPDF), along with Allied intelligence from other sources, indicated that Japanese troops were present east of Lunga Point. To investigate further, on 19 August, a Marine patrol of 60 men and four native scouts, commanded by U.S. Marine Captain Charles H. Brush, marched east from the Lunga perimeter.

=== Shibuya's Patrol ===
At the same time, Ichiki sent forward his own patrol of 38 men, led by his communications officer, Captain Yoshimi Shibuya, to reconnoiter Allied troop dispositions and establish a forward communications base. Around 12:00 on 19 August at Koli Point, Brush's patrol sighted and ambushed the Japanese patrol, killing all but five of its members, who escaped back to Taivu. The Marines suffered three dead and three wounded. Brush, a Reservist, was considered a capable leader and was later awarded a Silver Star for his actions. Papers discovered on the bodies of some of the Japanese officers in the patrol revealed that they belonged to a much larger unit and showed detailed intelligence of U.S. Marine positions around Lunga Point. The papers did not detail exactly how large the Japanese force was or whether an attack was imminent.

Now anticipating an attack from the east, the U.S. Marine forces, under the direction of Vandegrift, prepared their defenses on the east side of the Lunga perimeter. Several official U.S. military histories identify the location of the eastern defenses of the Lunga perimeter as emplaced on the Tenaru River. The Tenaru River, however, was located further to the east. The river forming the eastern boundary of the Lunga perimeter was the Ilu River, nicknamed Alligator Creek by the Marines, a double misnomer: there are crocodiles not alligators in the Solomons, and Alligator "Creek" was a tidal lagoon separated from the ocean by a sandbar about 7 to 15 meters (23 to 49 ft) wide and 30 meters (98 ft) long.

Along the west side of Alligator Creek, Colonel Clifton B. Cates, commander of the 1st Marine Regiment, deployed his 1st (Lieutenant Colonel Leonard B. Cresswell) and 2nd Battalions (Lieutenant Colonel Edwin A. Pollock). To help further defend the Alligator Creek sandbar, Cates deployed 100 men from the 1st Special Weapons Battalion with two 37 mm anti-tank guns equipped with canister shot. Marine divisional artillery, consisting of both 75 mm and 105 mm guns, pre-targeted locations on the east side and sandbar areas of Alligator Creek, and forward artillery observers emplaced themselves in the forward Marine positions. The Marines worked all day on 20 August to prepare their defenses as much as possible before nightfall.

Learning of the annihilation of Shibuya's patrol, Ichiki quickly sent forward a company to bury the bodies and followed with the rest of his troops, marching throughout the night of 19 August and finally halting at 04:30 on 20 August within a few miles of the U.S. Marine positions on the east side of Lunga Point. At this location, he prepared his troops to attack the Allied positions that night.

== Battle ==
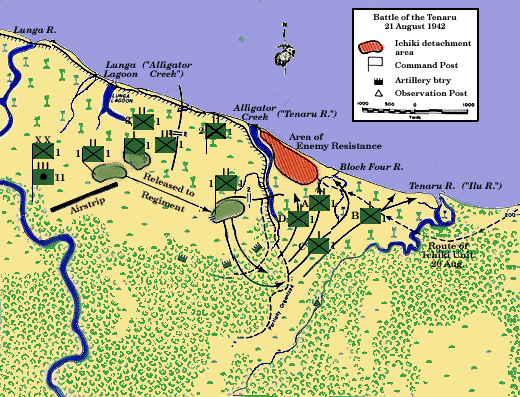
Map of the battle of 21 August

Just after midnight on 21 August, Ichiki's main body of troops arrived at the east bank of Alligator Creek and were surprised to encounter the Marine positions, not having expected to find U.S. forces so far from the airfield. Nearby U.S. Marine listening posts heard "clanking" sounds, human voices, and other noises before withdrawing to the west bank of the creek. Ichiki consulted Major Kuramoto, the Battalion commander as well as the leading company commander. Ichiki then ordered an assault across the sandbar by a detachment of men, while the other troops provided covering fire. The green flare signaling the attack was fired at 01:30 and Ichiki's force opened fire with machine guns and mortars on the Marine positions on the west bank of the creek, and a first wave of about 100 Imperial soldiers from the 2nd company charged across the sandbar towards the Marines; crossing the sandbar would become the primary objective of frequent Japanese attacks.

Marine machine gun fire and canister rounds from the 37 mm cannons killed most of the Japanese soldiers as they charged across the sandbar, though a few of the Japanese soldiers reached across, cut through the barbed wire they found on the other end and engaged in hand-to-hand combat with the defenders, and captured a few of the Marine front-line emplacements. Japanese machine gun and rifle fire from the east side of the creek killed several of the Marine machine-gunners. A company of Marines, held in reserve just behind the front line, attacked and killed most, if not all, of the remaining Japanese soldiers that had breached the front line defenses, ending Ichiki's first assault about an hour after it had begun.

At 02:30 Ichiki ordered a second assault by the 1st and 3rd companies, and 150-200 Japanese troops again made a headlong attack, charging across the sandbar, and was again almost completely wiped out. A group of bold Japanese soldiers managed to swim in the creek and set up a machine gun on an abandoned amphibious tractor, their gunfire killed most of the Marines manning the 37mm gun that had wrought havoc on the attackers, and their continuous fire suppressed the gun for most of the battle. At least one of the surviving Imperial officers from this attack advised Ichiki to withdraw his remaining forces, but Ichiki declined to do so. This was the last concentrated charge across the sandbar, which had then become strewn with bodies of dead soldiers attempting to break through the marine defensive perimeter.

As Ichiki's troops regrouped east of the creek, Japanese mortars, grenade discharges and rifle grenades bombarded the Marine lines. The Marines answered with 75 mm artillery barrages and mortar fire into the areas east of the creek. At about 05:00, another wave of Japanese troops attacked, this time attempting to flank the Marine positions by wading through the ocean surf and attacking up the beach into the west bank area of the creek bed. The Marines responded with heavy machine gun and artillery fire along the beachfront area, again causing heavy casualties among Ichiki's attacking troops and causing them to abandon their attack and withdraw back to the east bank of the creek. For the next couple of hours, the two sides exchanged rifle, machine gun, and artillery fire at close range across the sandbar and creek.

In spite of the heavy losses his force had suffered, Ichiki's troops remained in place on the east bank of the creek, either unable or unwilling to withdraw, and ranged a lot of gunfire into any targets that revealed themselves across the sandbar. At daybreak on 21 August, the commanders of the U.S. Marine units facing Ichiki's troops conferred on how best to proceed. Noting that the Japanese attacking force had sustained heavy losses in their frontal charge on the Marines's position and that the Japanese attacking element seemed to be concentrated in a fairly small area near the sandspit, they decided to counterattack. The 1st Battalion, 1st Marine Regiment, under Cresswell, crossed Alligator Creek upstream from the battle area, enveloped Ichiki's troops from the south and east, cutting off any avenue for retreat, and began to "compress" Ichiki's troops into a small area in a coconut grove on the east bank of the creek. At 09:50 Cresswell's battalion began its advance north, with C Company reaching the coast first and isolating a platoon of Japanese infantry which reacted with what was labeled as "The customary Japanese bayonet charge".

Aircraft from Henderson Field strafed Japanese soldiers who attempted to escape down the beach and, later in the afternoon, four or five Marine M3 Stuart tanks attacked across the sandbar into the coconut grove. One Nambu machine gun crew continued to give the Marines trouble, being sited in good cover on the outer lee of the sandspit, but it was promptly silenced by well directed mortar fire. The tanks swept the coconut grove with machine gun and canister cannon fire as well as rolling over the bodies, both alive and dead, of any Japanese soldiers unable or unwilling to get out of the way. Many Japanese troops died attempting desperately to meet the tanks with grenades or magnetic mines. One tank had its track broken by an explosion from a grenade prompting the rest of the tanks to surround it protectively and evacuate its crew. When the tank attack was over, Vandegrift wrote that, "the rear of the tanks looked like meat grinders." Despite combing the grove with tanks, fire from Japanese stragglers did not cease, and had even intensified when Cresswell's envelopment push started nearing the grove.

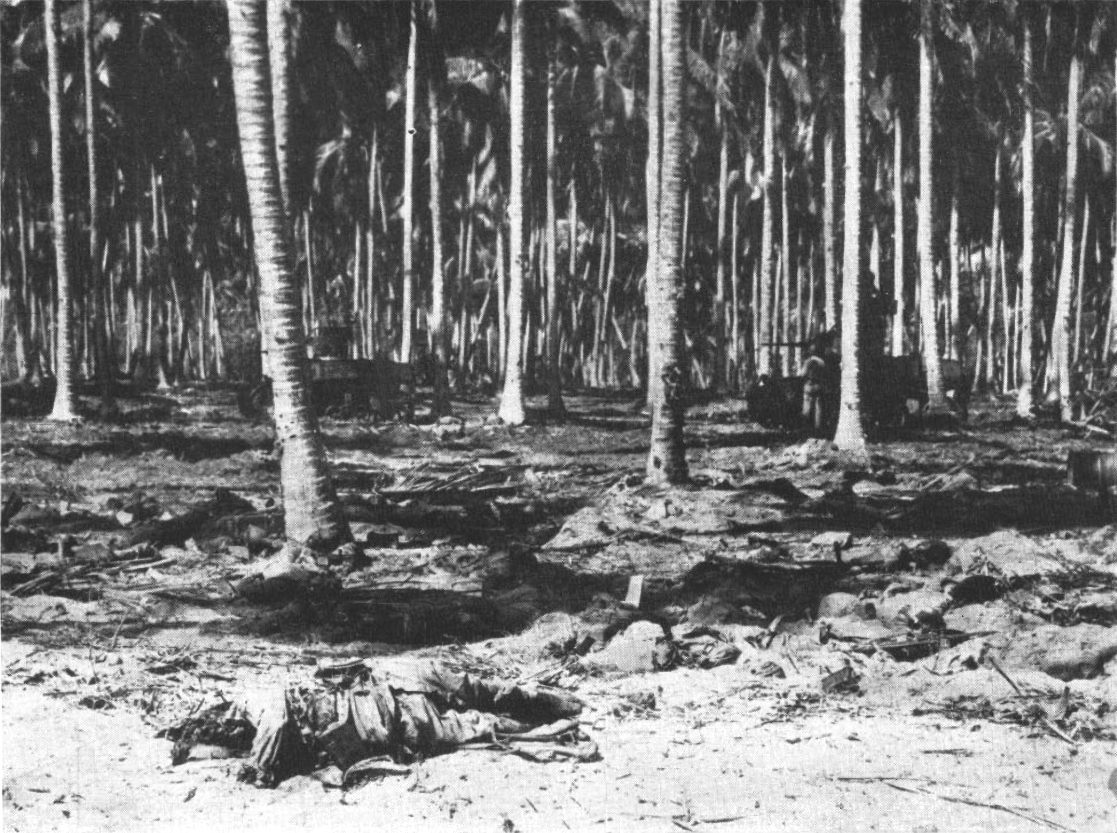
Japanese soldiers, killed while assaulting U.S. Marine Corps positions, lie dead in a coconut grove on Guadalcanal after the Battle of the Tenaru on 21 August 1942. Two U.S. Marine Corps M3 Stuart tanks of A Company, 1st Tank Battalion, participating in the battle in late afternoon are visible in the background.

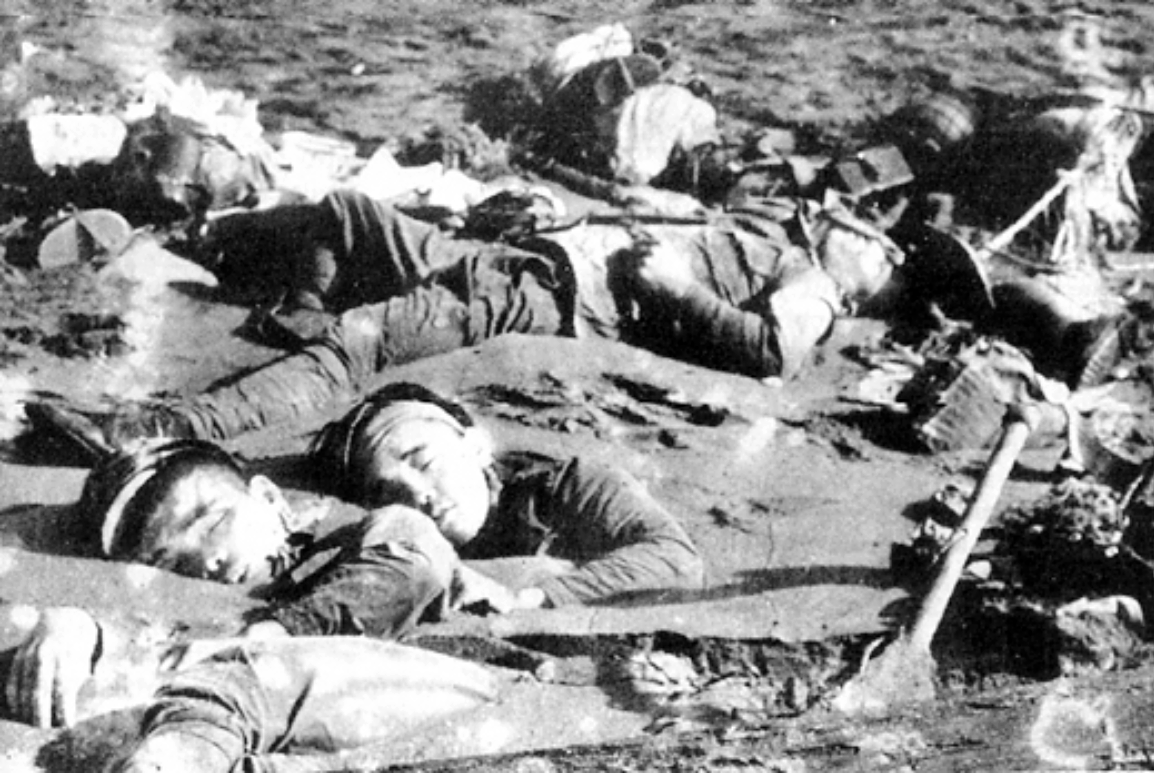
Dead soldiers from Ichiki's forces lie partially buried on the sandbar of Alligator Creek after the battle.

By 17:00 on 21 August, Japanese resistance had ended. Colonel Ichiki was either killed during the final stages of the battle or performed ritual suicide (seppuku) shortly thereafter, depending on the account. As curious Marines began to walk around looking at the battlefield, some wounded Japanese troops opened fire, killing or wounding several of them. Thereafter, Marines shot and/or bayoneted any Japanese soldier lying on the ground who moved. About fifteen injured and unconscious Japanese soldiers were taken prisoner. (Note: Frank (Guadalcanal, p. 156) states that the official Japanese Defense Agency history of the battle (Senshi Sōshō) says that Ichiki performed seppuku, but one Japanese survivor's account states that he was last seen advancing towards the U.S. lines.) About thirty of the Japanese troops escaped to rejoin their regiment's rear echelon at Taivu Point. Overall, about 800 Japanese soldiers were killed during the fighting.

== Aftermath ==
For the U.S. and its allies, the victory in the Tenaru battle was psychologically significant in that Allied soldiers, after a series of defeats by Japanese Army units throughout the Pacific and east Asia, now knew that they could defeat the Imperial Armies in a land battle. The battle set another precedent that would continue throughout the war in the Pacific, which was the reluctance of defeated Japanese soldiers to surrender and their efforts to continue killing Allied soldiers, even as the Japanese soldiers lay dying on the battlefield. On this subject Vandegrift remarked, "I have never heard or read of this kind of fighting. These people refuse to surrender. The wounded wait until men come up to examine them [...] and blow themselves and the other fellow to pieces with a hand grenade." Robert Leckie, a Guadalcanal veteran, recalls the aftermath of the battle in his book Helmet for My Pillow, "Our regiment had killed something like nine hundred of them. Most lay in clusters or heaps before the gun pits commanding sandspit as though they had not died singly but in groups. Moving among them were the souvenir hunters, picking their way delicately as though fearful of booby traps, while stripping the bodies of their possessions."

The battle was psychologically significant in that Imperial soldiers believed in their own invincibility and superior spirit. By 25 August, most of Ichiki's survivors reached Taivu Point and radioed Rabaul to tell 17th Army headquarters that Ichiki's detachment had been "almost annihilated at a point short of the airfield." Reacting with disbelief to the news, Japanese Army headquarters officers proceeded with plans to deliver additional troops to Guadalcanal to reattempt to capture Henderson Field. The next major Japanese attack on the Lunga perimeter occurred at the Battle of Edson's Ridge about three weeks later, employing a significantly larger force than had been employed at Tenaru and coming much closer to a victory.

== Depictions ==
The Battle of the Tenaru is a key part of the 1945 biographical film about Al Schmid, Pride of the Marines. The brunt of the Japanese assault was borne by Marines Corporal Lee Diamond, Private First Class John Rivers, and Private Schmid. The three were credited with 200 Japanese killed in action. Awarded the Navy Cross (America's second highest decoration) for their actions, the trio paid dearly. Rivers lost his life, while Schmid and Diamond suffered horrendous wounds. Schmid lost sight in one eye and was left with very little in the other after a grenade exploded near him. Shot in his arm early in the fight, Diamond's arms and hands were also ripped by the same grenade which blinded Schmid.

In 2010, the battle became the climax of the first episode of Steven Spielberg's and Tom Hanks' miniseries, The Pacific, as seen from the perspective of Private Robert Leckie.
