= Al Schmid =

United States Marine

Albert ("Al") Andrew Schmid
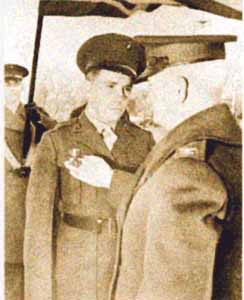
- Al Schmid receiving the Navy Cross at the Philadelphia Navy Yard on February 18, 1943 (Official Marine Corps photo)
- Born: Albert Andrew Schmid; 20 October 1920; Philadelphia, Pennsylvania, US
- Died: 1 December 1982 (aged 62); St. Petersburg, Florida, US
- Military career
- Allegiance: United States of America
- Branch: U.S. Marine Corps
- Service years: 1941–1944
- Rank: Sergeant
- Conflicts: World War II: Pacific War; Guadalcanal Campaign; Battle of Tenaru (WIA)
- Awards: Navy Cross; Purple Heart Medal

Albert Andrew Schmid (20 October 1920 – 1 December 1982) was a United States Marine awarded the Navy Cross for his heroism at the Battle of the Tenaru (Ilu River) during the Guadalcanal campaign in World War II. Credited with killing over 200 Japanese attackers during a night-long assault, he was blinded in action by a grenade blast and endured multiple surgeries and extended rehabilitation upon his return to the United States

His life story appeared in the American news magazines of the time, the book Al Schmid, Marine by Roger Butterfield, and the 1945 film Pride of the Marines, in which he was played by American actor John Garfield.

== Early life ==
Albert Andrew Schmid was born in the Burholme neighborhood of Philadelphia, the second son and third child of Adolph and Marian Schmid who both came from Germany to Philadelphia in the early 1880s. His father worked as a truck driver and baker. His mother died around 1932, and his father remarried in 1934. Albert (Al) moved out around 1938, eventually becoming an apprentice steel burner at the Dodge Steel Company in Philadelphia in 1940.

== World War II ==
Schmid enlisted in the United States Marine Corps on December 9, 1941, after hearing on the radio of the December 7 attack on Pearl Harbor. He received recruit training at Parris Island, South Carolina, and further training at New River, North Carolina, where he was assigned to the 11th Machine Gun Squad, Company H, 2nd Battalion, 1st Marine Regiment, 1st Marine Division. While on leave, he used a $60 bonus (equivalent to $1,180 in 2025) from his employer to purchase an engagement ring for his girlfriend Ruth Hartley, a salesgirl he first met in May 1941.

The 1st Marines landed on Guadalcanal on August 7, 1942, the largest Marine force ever engaged in landing operations up to that time and first American offensive against the Japanese. Schmid, a private, was assigned as an assistant gunner/loader of a three-man crew manning a M1917A1 Browning heavy machine gun (water cooled, 30 caliber) led by the crew's commander Corporal Leroy Diamond, with Private First Class Johnny Rivers as gunner. Schmid refused medical treatment for a serious foot infection in order to remain in combat with his team and fellow Marines.

On the night of August 21, an assault force of 800 Japanese crack infantry troops sent from Rabaul on August 18 under the command of Japanese Colonel Kiyonao Ichiki attempted to break through the 2nd Battalion, 1st Marines's perimeter and recapture the hotly contested Henderson Field airstrip. To reach it, Ichiki's infantry regiment had to cross the Ilu River. Cpl. Diamond's team was entrenched and posted on its west bank.

The Japanese attack began under the light of flares at 3:00 am. Part way into the assault, Pfc. Rivers was killed. Pvt. Schmid took over the gun and fired it for over four hours. As the assault progressed, Diamond was seriously wounded in the arm, and several bullets hit and shredded the Browning's water jacket. Guided by Cpl. Diamond's fire direction, Schmid kept shooting the gun by himself and loading 250-round belts of ammunition with and without help. Utilizing short bursts to avoid overheating and jamming, Schmid kept firing the machine gun even though it glowed red hot. Ultimately, a crawling Japanese soldier threw a grenade into their machine gun position, wounding Schmid in the shoulder, arm, hand, and face.

In spite of being blinded by the blast, Schmid resumed manning the gun, both firing and replacing ammunition belts in response to physical and verbal cues from Diamond as the Japanese continued to pour across the Ilu firing their weapons at the gun emplacement covered by a sniper firing from a tree across the river.

The next morning, over 200 dead Japanese were counted in front of Schmid's position. Only 15 of the original attackers survived the assault, a solitary soldier among the 800 escaping unwounded. Colonel Ichiki committed suicide.

Schmid subsequently returned stateside for treatment of his wounds at the San Diego Naval Hospital. On January 18, 1943, he arrived home in Philadelphia. On April 10, 1943, the city turned out in a massive parade to honor their hometown hero.

=== Navy Cross ===
All three Marines—Rivers, Diamond, and Schmid—were awarded the Navy Cross for extraordinary heroism, Schmid receiving his medal at the Philadelphia Navy Yard on February 18, 1943. He was also promoted to corporal (he was later promoted to sergeant).

- Service: Marine Corps
- Rank: Private
- Battalion: 2d Battalion
- Division: 1st Marine Division

Citation:

The President of the United States of America takes pleasure in presenting the Navy Cross to Private Albert Andrew Schmid (MCSN: 350951), United States Marine Corps Reserve, for extraordinary heroism and conspicuous devotion to duty while serving as a Machine Gunner of the Eleventh Machine Gun Squad, Company H, Second Battalion, First Marines, First Marine Division, in action against enemy Japanese armed forces at the Tenaru River, Guadalcanal, Solomon Islands, on 21 August 1942. Lacking the protection of riflemen, Private Schmid's machine gun squad was forced to tear down its frontal protection to meet the oncoming strong Japanese landing force. In spite of tremendous difficulties, the enemy attack was courageously met and repulsed by fierce and determined fighting during which Private Schmid was seriously wounded. His personal valor and loyal devotion to duty contributed to the defeat of the enemy.

== Post World War II ==
Schmid married Ruth Hartley on April 4, 1943. They had a son, Al Schmid, Jr., in June 1944. Schmid spoke at war bond rallies across the nation before being honorably discharged from the Marine Corps on December 9, 1944. He remained in the public's eye throughout the war largely through Roger Butterfield's book, Al Schmid, Marine and the Warner Bros.' film released in August 1945, Pride of the Marines.

In June 1946, Schmid was named Father of the Year in Pennsylvania, and the Democratic Party nominated Schmid as a candidate for the Pennsylvania Secretary of Internal Affairs, but he lost the election.

Schmid eventually recovered partial sight in one eye, but problems with his leg during the cold winters led him to retire in 1957 and move to St. Petersburg, Florida, with his wife and two sons.

Al Schmid died of bone cancer on December 1, 1982. On December 6, he was buried at Arlington National Cemetery. His wife Ruth was also buried in Arlington National Cemetery, on September 12, 2002 (died August 15, 2002).
