= John Miles (actor) =

American actor

- Born: June 12, 1923; Philadelphia, Pennsylvania, U.S.
- Died: May 17, 2006 (aged 82); Vero Beach, Florida, U.S.
- Other name: Johnny Miles
- Years active: (secured) 1944–1950

John "Johnny" Miles (June 12, 1923 – May 17, 2006) was an American actor who appeared in 19 movies between 1944 and 1950.

Miles played the lead in his last film The Tattooed Stranger (1950), a film noir shot on location in New York City. His other roles consist mainly of small supporting parts in films like Gunfighters (1947), based upon a Zane Grey novel with a screenplay by Alan Le May, and the B-picture The Fabulous Texan (1947) starring Wild Bill Elliott, John Carroll, Catherine McLeod, and Andy Devine.

== Filmography ==
- Wing and a Prayer (1944; uncredited)
- Three Is a Family (1944; uncredited)
- Roughly Speaking (1945; uncredited)
- Hotel Berlin (1945; uncredited)
- God Is My Co-Pilot (1945; uncredited)
- Pillow to Post (1945; uncredited)
- Pride of the Marines (1945; uncredited)
- Star in the Night (1945)
- Too Young to Know (1946)
- San Antonio (1946; uncredited)
- Janie Gets Married (1946; uncredited)
- Night and Day (1946; uncredited)
- Gunfighters (1947)
- The Hal Roach Comedy Carnival (1947)
- The Fabulous Joe (1947)
- The Fabulous Texan (1947)
- The Babe Ruth Story (1948; uncredited)
- Mother Is a Freshman (1949; uncredited)
- The Tattooed Stranger (1950)
