= Kiyonao Ichiki =

Japanese general (1892–1942)

- 一木 清直
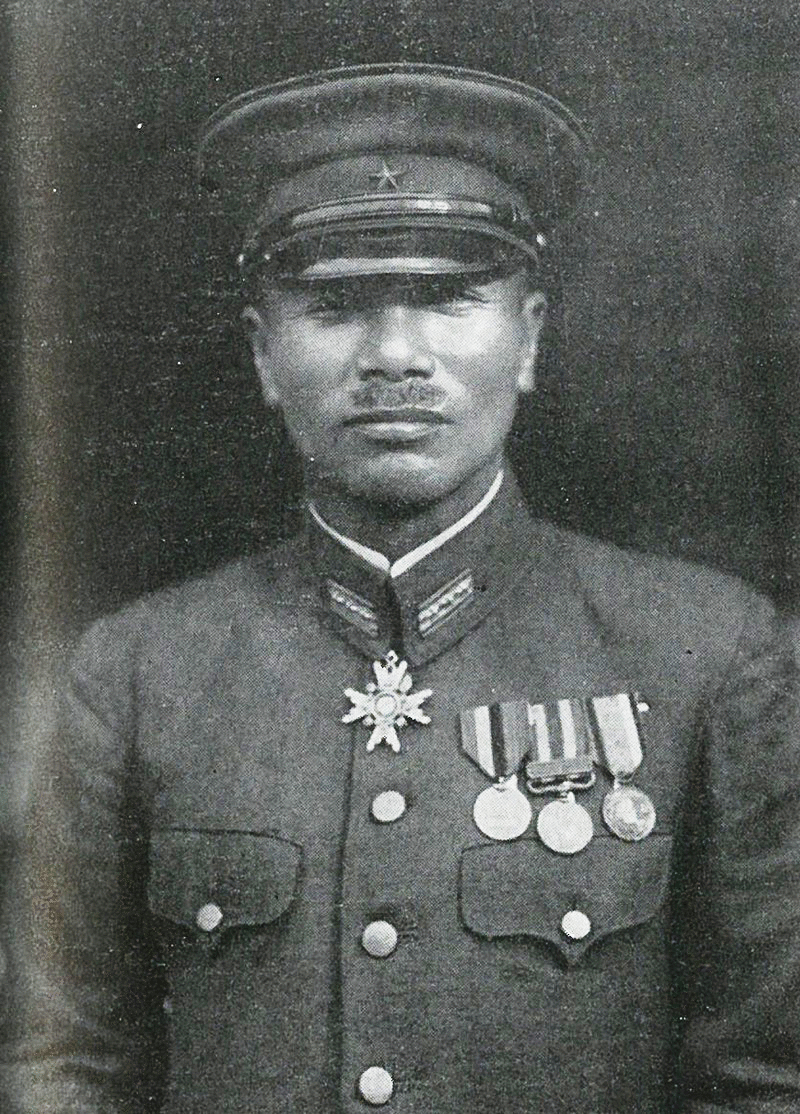
- Born: 16 October 1892; Shizuoka prefecture, Japan
- Died: 21 August 1942 (aged 49); Guadalcanal, Solomon Islands
- Military career
- Allegiance: Empire of Japan
- Branch: Imperial Japanese Army
- Service years: 1916–1942
- Rank: Major General (posthumous)
- Conflicts: Second Sino-Japanese War; Marco Polo Bridge incident; World War II; Pacific War; Guadalcanal campaign; Battle of the Tenaru †

Kiyonao Ichiki (一木 清直, Ichiki Kiyonao; 16 October 1892 – 21 August 1942) was an officer in the Imperial Japanese Army in World War II. Ichiki commanded the 28th Infantry Regiment "Ichiki detachment" in the Battle of the Tenaru. The regiment was disastrously defeated by the 1st Marine Regiment and of the 917 soldiers of Ichiki's 1st echelon, only 128 survived. Ichiki was either killed during the final stages of the battle, or performed ritual suicide (seppuku) shortly thereafter.

== Biography ==
=== Early life ===
Born in Shizuoka Prefecture, Ichiki graduated from the 28th class of the Imperial Japanese Army Academy in 1916. He subsequently served two tours as an instructor at the Imperial Army's Infantry School in Chiba.

=== War in China ===
Promoted to major in 1934, Ichiki was assigned to the China Garrison Army as a battalion commander of the 1st Infantry Regiment in 1936. On 7 July 1937, the Japanese conducted a practice night attack around the Marco Polo Bridge, firing blanks in the air. The Chinese, thinking an attack was underway, fired a few ineffectual artillery shells. A Japanese soldier failed to show up for roll call the next morning, and Ichiki, his company commander, thought that the Chinese had captured him. He ordered an immediate attack on Wanping, precipitating the first real battle of the Second Sino-Japanese War.

Recalled to Japan soon after the incident, Ichiki served as an instructor in specialized military equipment training schools from 1938 until 1940.

=== Pacific War ===
With the start of the Pacific War in 1941, Ichiki was promoted to colonel and was placed in command of the IJA 28th Infantry Regiment, from the 7th Division, which consisted of 3,000 troops, and was assigned to assault and occupy Midway island. The defeat of Japanese naval forces at the Battle of Midway in June 1942 forced a cancellation of the operation. In August 1942, Ichiki and his regiment were transferred to the IJA 17th Army in the southern front and were based at Truk in the Caroline Islands. After Allied forces landed on Guadalcanal in the Solomon Islands, as part of the Allied Guadalcanal campaign, Ichiki was assigned to take a portion of his regiment (2nd Battalion, 28th Infantry Regiment, with artillery and engineers; nicknamed the “Ichiki Detachment”) to recapture Henderson Airfield and drive the Allied forces off the island.

On 19 August, six Japanese destroyers carried Ichiki and his 916 troops from Truk and landed them at Taivu Point on Guadalcanal. Ichiki had been ordered to wait on the beachhead for the remainder of his regiment, but finding the beach deserted and the island apparently lightly defended, Ichiki grossly underestimated the strength of the American forces, left a rear guard of 125 men, and advanced to make a nighttime frontal assault against the American positions. Ichiki had previously referred to US Marines as effeminate and cowardly and so, committed the error of grossly underestimating his enemy. Unknown to Ichiki, the American Marines were aware of his landing and were entrenched in defensive positions. In the Battle of the Tenaru of 21 August 1942 Ichiki was defeated with extremely heavy losses. Recent Japanese scholarship disputes the claim that Ichiki was personally at fault, and state that the Imperial General Staff placed Ichiki in a suicidal position by ordering him to attack prepared positions, outnumbered 15 to 1, without air, naval or heavy artillery support, and with poor intelligence that vastly underestimated American strength. The additional troops from his second group would not have changed this equation. However, the General Staff needed a scapegoat, and decided to pin the failure on Ichiki. There was also speculation that the General Staff preferred to send Ichiki to battle directly from the aborted Midway operation, calculating that if the detachment returned to Japan the secret of the failure at Midway would leak.

Accounts differ as to how Ichiki died. At least one account claims that Ichiki was killed in action during the heat of battle; others state that he committed ritual suicide due to the humiliation of his defeat in the battle. Despite the failure of his attack, Ichiki was promoted posthumously to major general.

== See also ==
- Marco Polo Bridge Incident
