= The Tattooed Stranger =

1950 film by Edward Montagne

- Theatrical release poster
- Directed by: Edward Montagne
- Screenplay by: Philip H. Reisman Jr.
- Produced by: Jay Bonafield
- Starring: John Miles; Patricia Barry; Walter Kinsella; Frank Tweddell
- Cinematography: William O. Steiner
- Edited by: David Cooper
- Music by: Alan Shulman
- Production company: RKO Pictures
- Distributed by: RKO Pictures
- Release dates: February 9, 1950 (Premiere-NYC); March 11, 1950 (US)
- Running time: 64 minutes
- Country: United States
- Language: English
- Budget: $100,000

The Tattooed Stranger, originally titled Backtrail, is a 1950 American crime film noir directed by Edward Montagne and starring John Miles, Patricia Barry (billed as Patricia White), Walter Kinsella, Frank Tweddell.

== Plot ==
When a dead woman is found in the park, her face obliterated by a shotgun, the New York police investigate. The only clue to her identity is a tattoo on her arm. Lieutenant Corrigan and rookie police detective Tobin lead the investigation. Corrigan is skeptical of Tobin's book learning, but soon sees it is useful. Tobin goes to botanist Dr. Mahan to identify blades of grass in the car in which the corpse was found. Mahan, a woman, identifies the source, a plant that doesn't usually grow in New York.

Someone steals into the morgue and destroys the tattoo and is shot when discovered. The police began to track down the tattoo parlor where the tattoo was made and discover the woman's name—or one of them. It turns out she's been marrying soldiers who were shipped out and collecting their insurance when they die.

The Tobin and Mahan determine the location of the grass they have found,and Corrigan finds out that sand used in the crime comes from a maker of funeral headstones. Meanwhile, the tattooist who identified the tattoo is murdered.

Tobin finds a headstone manufacturer. He is very nervous and denies knowing anything about it. But the killer is there, and kills the owner. Tobin faces him in a final showdown in the cemetery.

== Cast ==
- John Miles as Detective Tobin
- Patricia Barry as Dr. Mary Mahan
- Walter Kinsella as Lieutenant Corrigan
- Frank Tweddell as Captain Lundquist
- Rod McLennan as Captain Gavin
- Henry Lasko as Joe Canko
- Arthur L. Jarrett as Johnny Marseille
- Jim Boles as Fisher
- William Gibberson as Aberfoyle
- Jack Lord as Det. Deke Del Vecchio

This was Miles' final film appearance and one of the first film roles for Lord, the future star of Hawaii Five-O.

== Production ==
In 1948, as a "sketch" for The Tattooed Stranger, producer Jay Bonafield and director Edward J. Montagne made a two-reel documentary short for RKO Pathe called Crime Lab, with roughly the same police-procedural plot.

The film features many New York location shots, many showing areas and structures that no longer exist, including elevated railroads, the Bowery when it was a derelict district and the dockside sections near the lower Manhattan bridges. Tobin and Mahan visit Fort Tryon Park with the George Washington Bridge visible in the background. Their investigation also leads them to Saint Raymond's Cemetery (Bronx).

== Reception ==
The New York Times wrote: "The thrills are few and far between in this manhunt but its authenticity is obvious."

Carl Macek, writing in Film Noir: An Encyclopedic Reference to the American Style, called The Tattooed Stranger "One of the seediest films ever made... populated with non-professional actors who suggest, rather than act out, the intrinsic fear and loathing found in many urban slums."
