= The Chaser (The Twilight Zone) =

- The Twilight Zone episode
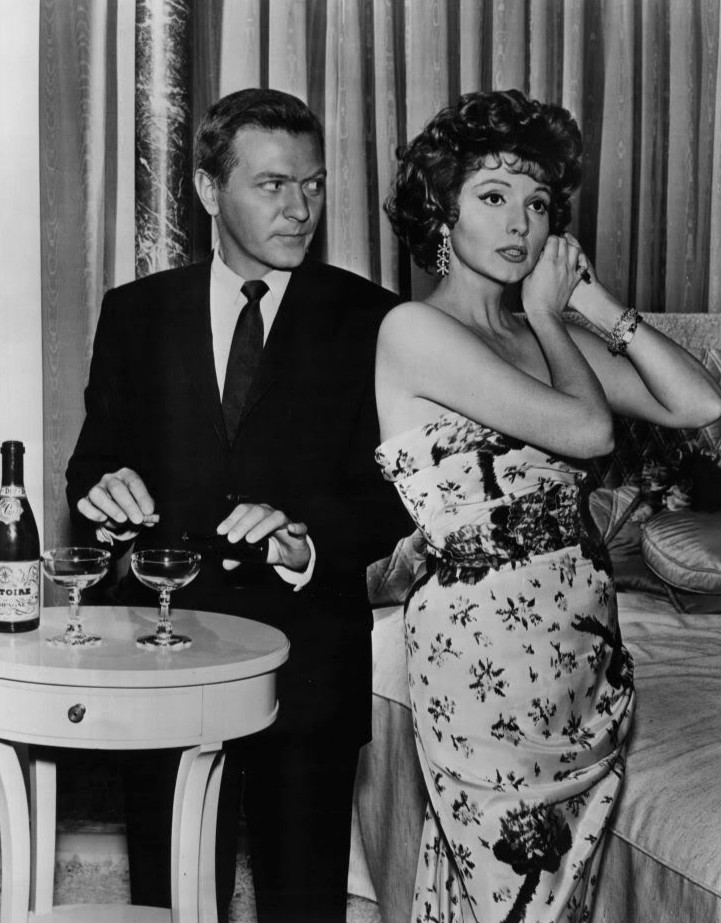
- George Grizzard and Patricia Barry.
- Episode no.: Season 1 Episode 31
- Directed by: Douglas Heyes
- Story by: John Henry Collier
- Teleplay by: Robert Presnell, Jr.
- Production code: 173-3636
- Original air date: May 13, 1960

Guest appearances
- George Grizzard as Roger Shackleforth; John McIntire as Professor A. Daemon; Patricia Barry as Leila; J. Pat O'Malley as Homburg; Marjorie Bennett as Old Woman; Barbara Perry as Blonde Woman

Episode chronology
← Previous "A Stop at Willoughby"	Next → "A Passage for Trumpet"
- The Twilight Zone (1959 TV series, season 1)

"The Chaser" is episode 31 of the American television anthology series The Twilight Zone.

== Opening narration ==
Mr. Roger Shackelforth. Age: youthful twenties. Occupation: being in love. Not just in love, but madly, passionately, illogically, miserably, all-consumingly in love - with a young woman named Leila, who has a vague recollection of his face and even less than a passing interest. In a moment, you'll see a switch, because Mr. Roger Shackelforth, the young gentleman so much in love, will take a short, but very meaningful journey into the Twilight Zone.

== Plot ==
Roger Shackleforth is desperately in love with Leila, an aloof woman who dismisses his affections. A stranger hands him the business card of an old professor named "A. Daemon", who can help with any problem. Roger visits Daemon, who after some resistance and suggestions that Roger will regret it, sells him a love potion for $1. Roger administers it in a glass of champagne; Leila falls madly in love with him and marries him, but soon her love becomes stifling.

Roger returns to the professor to buy poison for $1,000, all of Roger's savings. Daemon cautions Roger that the "glove cleaner" is odorless, tasteless, and completely undetectable, but must be used immediately and completely, or the user will lose his nerve and never again have the courage to try it. After Roger leaves, the professor muses, "First, the 'stimulant'... and then the 'chaser'."

When he gets home, Roger prepares a glass of champagne with the new potion. Just as he is about to give Leila her poisoned drink, she reveals—by showing him baby booties which she is knitting—that she is pregnant; Roger is shocked and drops both glasses. He says that he could not have gone through with it anyway, then passes out.

On Roger and Leila's terrace, Daemon relaxes with a cigar, and after puffing a smoke ring that turns into a heart, disappears.

== Closing narration ==
Mr. Roger Shackelforth, who has discovered at this late date that love can be as sticky as a vat of molasses, as unpalatable as a hunk of spoiled yeast, and as all-consuming as a six-alarm fire in a bamboo and canvas tent. Case history of a lover boy, who should never have entered the Twilight Zone.

== Production notes ==
This episode was adapted by Robert Presnell, Jr. from the short story "The Chaser" by John Collier. The script was originally written for and produced live on television on The Billy Rose Television Theatre in 1951.

In Serling: The Rise and Twilight of Television's Last Angry Man, the episode's director Douglas Heyes said, "That was one of the great things about The Twilight Zone. I had total freedom. Sometimes I would think of an idea that would make the episode more Twilight Zone-y [but] that would require some expense. I remember one episode, 'The Chaser', in which I devised a huge bookcase that must have doubled the budget, but [Serling and producer Buck Houghton] never blinked an eye. They just said, 'Okay, great!' I didn't have to argue with anybody over the money—they'd argue about the money and let me have it! I knew that they were having problems with Jim Aubrey, but they kept them away from me. My responsibility was to get the job done."

The short story also was adapted in 1951 for the Tales from the Crypt comic, where it was retitled "Loved to Death!!" This was adapted in 1991 as "Loved to Death" (no exclamation points) for the HBO adult-horror anthology series Tales from the Crypt. The episode starred Andrew McCarthy and Mariel Hemingway.

This is one of several episodes from season one with its opening title sequence plastered over with the opening for season two. This was done during the summer of 1961, so that the repeats of season-one episodes would fit in with the new look the show had taken during the following season. As originally aired, this was the final episode of the series with the original UPA "pit and summit" title sequence.

== See also ==
- List of The Twilight Zone (1959 TV series) episodes
