= Safe at Home! =

1962 film by Walter Doniger

- Directed by: Walter Doniger
- Screenplay by: Robert Dillon
- Story by: Robert Dillon; Tom Naud; Steven Ritch
- Produced by: Tom Naud
- Starring: Mickey Mantle; Roger Maris
- Cinematography: Irving Lippman
- Edited by: Frank P. Keller
- Music by: Van Alexander
- Distributed by: Columbia Pictures
- Release date: April 13, 1962
- Running time: 84 minutes
- Country: United States
- Language: English

Safe at Home! is a 1962 American comedy sports film starring Major League Baseball players Mickey Mantle and Roger Maris of the New York Yankees. The film also stars William Frawley (in his final film appearance) and Don Collier, with appearances by Yankees Whitey Ford and Ralph Houk.

The film concerns a Florida boy who lies to his Little League teammates, telling them that he knows Mantle and Maris and will bring them to their team banquet. His attempts to meet his heroes during spring training by sneaking into the stadium and the players' hotel room result in chaos. The film was shot in Fort Lauderdale and Pompano Beach, Florida.

== Plot ==
Hutch Lawton is a young boy living on a boat in Florida with his father, Ken. Ken is a single father who runs a charter fishing business, and is frequently away from Hutch and keeps missing Hutch's baseball games. As a result, Hutch has many responsibilities for a boy his age. Ken's girlfriend Jo is also a frequent presence in Hutch's life.

Hutch is a big baseball fan, and greatly admires Mickey Mantle and Roger Maris, even fantasizing about playing the outfield with them during games. While walking to school with his best friend Mike, Hutch brags to teammate Henry that his father knows Mantle and Maris. To prove he knows them, he forges their signatures on their pictures and gives them to Henry. His deception snowballs as he claims his father will get Mantle and Maris to attend the team's banquet.

Desperate to dig himself out of trouble, he stows away on Mike's father's fish truck to get to the Yankees' training camp in Fort Lauderdale. Upon disembarking from the truck and smelling of fish, he is immediately followed by a stray cat. He goes to the Yankees' training camp but Mantle and Maris are mobbed by fans, so he is unable to talk to them. He does, however, talk to their coach, Bill Turner. He takes a taxi to the Yankees' hotel and sneaks into Mantle's room. Turner discovers him by following his fishy smell, and Turner confronts him with Mantle and Maris, who nonetheless invite him to the next day's practice.

Hutch stays in the stadium overnight where he fantasizes about playing there, accidentally sets off a cannon and sprinkler, and is reunited with the stray cat. Discovered in the stadium in the morning, Turner takes him under his wing, and invites him to practice with the team. Meanwhile, Mike's mother discovers Hutch is missing and has the Coast Guard contact Ken, who immediately heads to the stadium with Jo. Hutch asks Mantle and Maris to come to the banquet, but they refuse because he lied.

Back home, he admits to his teammates that he lied. Henry's father admires Hutch's bravery in admitting his lies. Ken then announces that Hutch has new friends in Mantle and Maris, and they have invited the whole team to Fort Lauderdale to work out with the Yankees. Hutch then takes his place in left field as Mantle and Maris join him in center field and right field.

== Cast ==
- Mickey Mantle as himself
- Roger Maris as himself
- William Frawley as Bill Turner
- Patricia Barry as Johanna Price
- Don Collier as Ken Lawton
- Eugene Iglesias as Mr. Torres
- Flip Mark as Henry
- Bryan Russell as Hutch Lawton
- Scott Lane as Mike Torres
- Charles G. Martin as Henry's Father
- Ralph Houk as himself
- Whitey Ford as himself

== See also ==
- List of American films of 1962
- List of baseball films
