= Patricia Barry =

American actress (1922–2016)

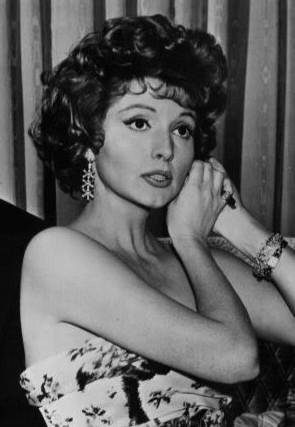
- Barry in "The Chaser", an episode of The Twilight Zone, 1960.
- Born: Patricia Allen White; November 16, 1922; Davenport, Iowa, U.S.
- Died: October 11, 2016 (aged 93); Los Angeles, California, U.S.
- Occupation: Actress
- Years active: 1945–2005
- Spouse: Philip Barry Jr. (m. 1950; died 1998)
- Children: 2

Patricia Barry (born Patricia Allen White, November 16, 1922 – October 11, 2016) was an American actress.

Although Barry has numerous credits performing in stage productions and in films, the majority of her work was in television between 1950 and 2005, when she appeared in over 100 series either in supporting roles or as a guest star.

== Early life and education ==
Barry was born in Davenport, Iowa. Her father was a physician. She attended Stephens College in Columbia, Missouri, where she received her academic and practical training in acting in the school's drama department, which was administered by the distinguished Broadway actress and teacher Maude Adams. After Barry's graduation from college, she gained some professional experience on stage in 1944 before winning a Rita Hayworth look-alike contest. The resulting publicity from that contest led to Barry being signed to a Hollywood movie contract with Warner Bros.

== Career ==
=== Stage ===
Barry's theatrical debut came in summer theater at Peterborough, New Hampshire. Her credits on Broadway include The Pink Elephant (1953) and Goodbye Again (1956). She also starred in productions in Los Angeles, California, and Flagstaff, Arizona. She joined Maudie Edwards company at the Palace Theatre in Swansea 1952

=== Film ===
Barry's performances in Hollywood productions began in 1946 with her involvement in five Warner Bros. films released that year. However, she received a screen credit–as Patricia White–in only one of those five, in The Beast with Five Fingers.

From 1947 to 1950, Barry gained additional acting experience in 16 other movies with Paramount Pictures, Columbia, RKO, and Gene Autry Productions. As before, when credited for her performances in those films, she continued to be recognized by her maiden name. However, following her marriage to producer Philip Barry Jr. in 1950, she began to use her married name professionally. She returned to film work occasionally, including The Tattooed Stranger, Safe at Home!, Send Me No Flowers, and Dear Heart.

Following those performances, she appeared in a few other theatrical releases in the coming decades, but the vast majority of her work continued to be on television. Some of her other films during that latter stage of her career include The Marriage of a Young Stockbroker (1971), The End of August, (1982), Twilight Zone: The Movie (1983), For Keeps (1989), City Rhythms (1989), and Sea of Love (1989). In 2014, just two years before her death and 25 years after her role in Sea of Love, Barry appeared in Delusional, her final film.

=== Television ===
For over 50 years, Barry was a very popular supporting character and guest star on "the small screen", appearing in scores of television series and made-for-television movies. Her first role on television was in 1950, in The Philco-Goodyear Television Playhouse presentation "The Life of Vincent Van Gogh", with Everett Sloane playing the artist. For the remainder of the 1950s and throughout the 1960s, she performed in nearly every genre of television programming, including contemporary televised plays, Westerns, situation comedies, doctor and detective series, courtroom dramas, and suspense, adventure, and science-fiction series.

Often she was cast as a high-class, avaricious femme fatale, although she also demonstrated in many series her abilities to perform a wide range of other characters. The following is only a small selection of the television series in which Barry appeared: The Alcoa Hour, Playhouse 90, The Third Man, Yancy Derringer, Sugarfoot, Maverick, The Rifleman, The Millionaire, 77 Sunset Strip, Rawhide, Gunsmoke, The Donna Reed Show, My Three Sons, Bachelor Father, Markham, Laramie, Alfred Hitchcock Presents, Tales of Wells Fargo, Going My Way, Thriller, Route 66, Perry Mason, The Twilight Zone, Harris Against the World, The Green Hornet, The Felony Squad, Judd for the Defense, CBS Playhouse, Ironside, The High Chaparral, and Mannix.

As Barry's career extended into the 1970s and beyond the 1990s, she continued her frequent guest roles on an array of top-rated weekly television series, such as Columbo; Police Woman; Charlie's Angels; Three's Company; Quincy, M.E.; Knots Landing; Dallas; and Murder, She Wrote. Barry also performed in a dozen made-for-television movies and became a recurring character on several major daily daytime dramas or soap operas playing Addie Horton on Days of Our Lives (1971–1974), Sally Gleason on Guiding Light (1985–87), Isabelle Alden on Loving (1992–1994), and Peg English on All My Children (1981–2005). Her performance on the February 28, 2005, episode of All My Children was Barry's last acting appearance broadcast on television.

During her prolific television career, Barry received three Emmy Award nominations for her performances, in 1957 for her role as a dying socialite in "Dark Victory" on Matinee Theater, in 1958 as Miss Calhoun in Startime's episode "The Wicked Scheme of Jebal Deeks", and in 1959 as Lucille in Playhouse 90's presentation "Reunion".

In 2016, a documentary film about the life of Patricia Barry "Heartland to Hollywood" was produced by Barry's daughters Miranda Barry and Stephanie Agnew.

== Activism ==
Outside of her acting career, Barry supported and served in a variety of educational foundations, charities, professional organizations, and women's advocacy groups. She was a charter member and past president of Women in Film (WIF), a Los Angeles–based organization established in 1973 to promote equal opportunities for women in the film industry and later to supporting the work of women not only in films, but also "in all other forms of global media." With regard to expanding support for female directors, producers, actors, technicians, and writers, Barry helped to promote the establishment of other WIF chapters throughout the United States and then, in the 1990s, in other countries through the creation of Women in Film and Television International. In addition to her work on behalf of WIF, Barry was the founding president of the American Film Institute Associates and served on boards and committees for Stephens College, the National Academy of Television Arts and Sciences, the Screen Actors Guild, the Academy of Motion Picture Arts and Sciences, and the John Tracy Clinic, a diagnostic and educational center that provides assistance to children coping with hearing loss.

== Personal life ==
Patricia was married for 48 years to producer and writer Philip Barry, Jr., until his death in 1998. The couple had two daughters.

== Death ==
On October 11, 2016, Patricia Barry died of natural causes at her home in Los Angeles, California, at the age of 93.
