= Wickham (surname) =

Wickham is a surname, and may refer to:

== A ==
- Alick Wickham (1886–1967), Solomon Islander swimmer and diver
- Andy Wickham (1947–2022), British producer in the American music business
- Anna Wickham (1883–1947), pseudonym of Edith Mary Harper, English poet
- Archie Wickham (1855–1935), English cricketer, Anglican clergyman and entomologist

== C ==
- Caroline Wickham-Jones (1955–2022), British archaeologist
- Charles Wickham (police officer) (1879–1971), commander of the Royal Ulster Constabulary
- Charles Preston Wickham (1836–1925), American congressman from Ohio
- Chris Wickham (1950–2026), Chichele Professor of Medieval History at Oxford
- Clennell Wickham (1895–1938), West Indian radical journalist
- Connor Wickham (born 1993), English footballer

== D ==
- David Wickham (born 1966), British pianist, conductor and music director

== E ==
- Edward Wickham (1890–1957), British Conservative politician
- Edward Wickham (priest) (1834–1910), English Anglican priest, Dean of Lincoln
- Enoch Tanner Wickham (1883–1970), American folk artist
- Evan Wickham (born 1981), American pastor and musician

== F ==
- F. D. Wickham (1873–1942), American colonel
- Florence Wickham (1880–1962), American operatic contralto

== G ==
- Geoffrey Wickham (born 1933), Australian pioneer of cardiac pacemaking
- Glynne Wickham (1922–2004), British Shakespearean and theatre scholar

== H ==
- Hadley Wickham (born 1979), New Zealand statistician
- Harry Wickham (1882–1962), Solomon Islander swimmer
- Henry Wickham (explorer) (1846–1928), British explorer
- Henry Lewis Wickham (1789–1864), Receiver General of Gibraltar and principal private secretary to Lord Althorp
- Henry T. Wickham (1849–1943), American lawyer and politician in the Virginia Senate
- Henry Wickham Wickham (1800–1876), British Conservative politician

== J ==
- Jeffry Wickham (1933–2014), English stage, film and television actor
- Jennifer Wickham, Canadian documentary filmmaker
- Joe Wickham (1890–1968), General Secretary of the Football Association of Ireland
- John Wickham (attorney) (1736–1839), American attorney
- John Wickham (urologist) (1927–2017), British urologist and surgeon
- John A. Wickham, Jr. (born 1928), US Army general
- John L. C. Wickham (1919–2018), Western Australian Supreme Court judge
- John Clements Wickham (1798–1864), Australian naval officer on Darwin's HMS Beagle and judge in Queensland
- Joseph Dresser Wickham (1797–1891), American minister

== K ==
- Keith Wickham (born 1965), British voice actor
- Ken Wickham (born 1969), American author
- Kevin Wickham (1939–2020), Australian rower
- Kevin Wickham (cricketer) (born 2003), West Indian cricketer

== L ==
- Lisa Wickham media producer and director in Trinidad and Tobago
- Louis Frédéric Wickham (1861–1913), French physician and pathologist

== M ==
- Mabel Wickham (1901–1992), British artist
- Madeleine Wickham (born 1969), British author of chick lit as Sophie Kinsella
- Merv Wickham (1914–1982), Australian rules footballer

== N ==
- Nick Wickham, British film and television director

== P ==
- Parker Wickham (1727–1785), New York Loyalist politician * Peter Wickham Barbadian political analyst and regional pollster
- Phil Wickham (born 1984), American Christian musician

== R ==
- Reginald Wickham (1871–1952), English cricketer
- Rob Wickham (born 1972), British Anglican bishop

== S ==
- Saskia Wickham (born 1967), British actress
- Sleydo' Molly Wickham (born 1986), Canadian Indigenous activist
- Stan Wickham (1877–1960), Australian rugby union footballer
- Stephen Wickham (born 1950), Australian photographer, painter and printmaker
- Steve Wickham, Irish musician
- Steven Wickham, British actor

== T ==
- Ted Wickham (1911–1994), Anglican Bishop of Middleton from 1959 to 1982
- Thomas Wickham (1810–1890), English cricketer
- Tom Wickham (born 1990), Australian field hockey player
- Tracey Wickham (born 1962), Australian swimmer

== U ==
- Una Wickham (1923–1983), New Zealand cricketer

== V ==
- Vicki Wickham (born 1939), English talent manager
- Vincent Schofield Wickham (1894–1968), American graphic artist and sculptor
- Vivian Wickham (born 12 June 1982), Solomon Islands association footballer

== W ==
- William Wickham (bishop) (1539–1595), English bishop
- William Wickham (civil servant) (1761–1840), British politician
- William Wickham (Conservative politician) (1831–1897), English Member of Parliament for Petersfield
- William Wickham (cricketer) (1825–1845), English cricketer
- William H. Wickham (1832–1893), mayor of New York (1875–76)
- Williams Carter Wickham (1820–1888), Confederate brigadier general and Virginian politician

== See also ==
- Wigham
- Whigham (disambiguation)
