= List of people on the postage stamps of the Solomon Islands =

This is a list of people on stamps of Solomon Islands.

The year given is the year of issue of the first stamp depicting that person.

Data has been entered up to the end of 2005.

== A ==
- Buzz Aldrin (1999)
- The Prince Andrew (1986)
- The Princess Anne (1973)
- Sam Aqarao (2002)
- Joseph Atkin, missionary (1971)
- John James Audubon (1985)

== B ==
- The Lord Baden-Powell (1982)
- Alexander Graham Bell (1976)
- Alvin Blum, Bahá'í missionary (2005)
- Gertrude Blum, Bahá'í missionary (2005)
- Louis Antoine de Bougainville (1972)

== C ==
- Prince William (now Prince of Wales) (2003)
- Philip Carteret (1972)
- Sir Winston Churchill (1966)
- Jean-Claude Colin (1996)
- Lord Cuthbert Collingwood (2005)
- James Cook (1979)

== D ==
- Bruni d'Entrecasteaux (1973)

== E ==
- The Duke of Edinburgh (1972)
- Elizabeth II (1953)
- Queen Elizabeth (1937)
- Bishop Epalle, missionary (1996)

== F ==
- Frank Jack Fletcher (1995)
- Joe Foss (2002)

== G ==
- Jean-François de Galaup, comte de Lapérouse (1970)
- George V (1913)
- George VI (1937)
- Robert L. Ghormley (1995)
- Helena Goldie, Methodist missionary (2002)
- J. F. Goldie, Methodist missionary (2002)

== H ==
- William Halsey, Jr. (1995)
- Sir Thomas Hardy (2005)
- Prince Harry (1985)
- Rowland Hill (1979)

== J ==
- Pope John Paul II (2004)

== K ==
- John F. Kennedy (1976)

== L ==
- Louis XVI of France (1994)

== M ==
- Guglielmo Marconi (1996)
- The Princess Margaret (1985)
- Álvaro de Mendaña de Neira (1956)
- Francisco Antonio Mourelle (1981)
- Douglas Albert Munro (2002)

== N ==
- Chūichi Nagumo (1995)
- Napoleon Bonaparte (2005)
- Admiral The Viscount Nelson (2005)

== P ==
- Mitchell Paige (2002)
- John Coleridge Patteson (1971)
- Mark Phillips (1973)

== R ==
- Ronald Reagan (2004)

== S ==
- Norman Scott (2002)
- George Augustus Selwyn (1999)
- John Shortland (1973)
- Sir William Smith (1982)
- Sulesi (1996)
- Surimahe (1996)

== T ==
- Stephen Taroaniara, missionary (1971)
- Abel Tasman (1971)

== V ==
- Alexander Vandegrift (1993)
- Queen Victoria (1970)
- Jacob C. Vouza (1992)

== W ==
- Alick Wickham, swimmer (1984)
- The Prince of Wales (1981)
- The Princess of Wales (1981)
- Charles Morris Woodford (1970)
- Orville Wright (2003)
- Wilbur Wright (2003)

== Y ==
- The Duchess of York (1986)
