= British Solomon Islands Protectorate Defence Force =

Colonial auxiliary military unit (1889–1978)

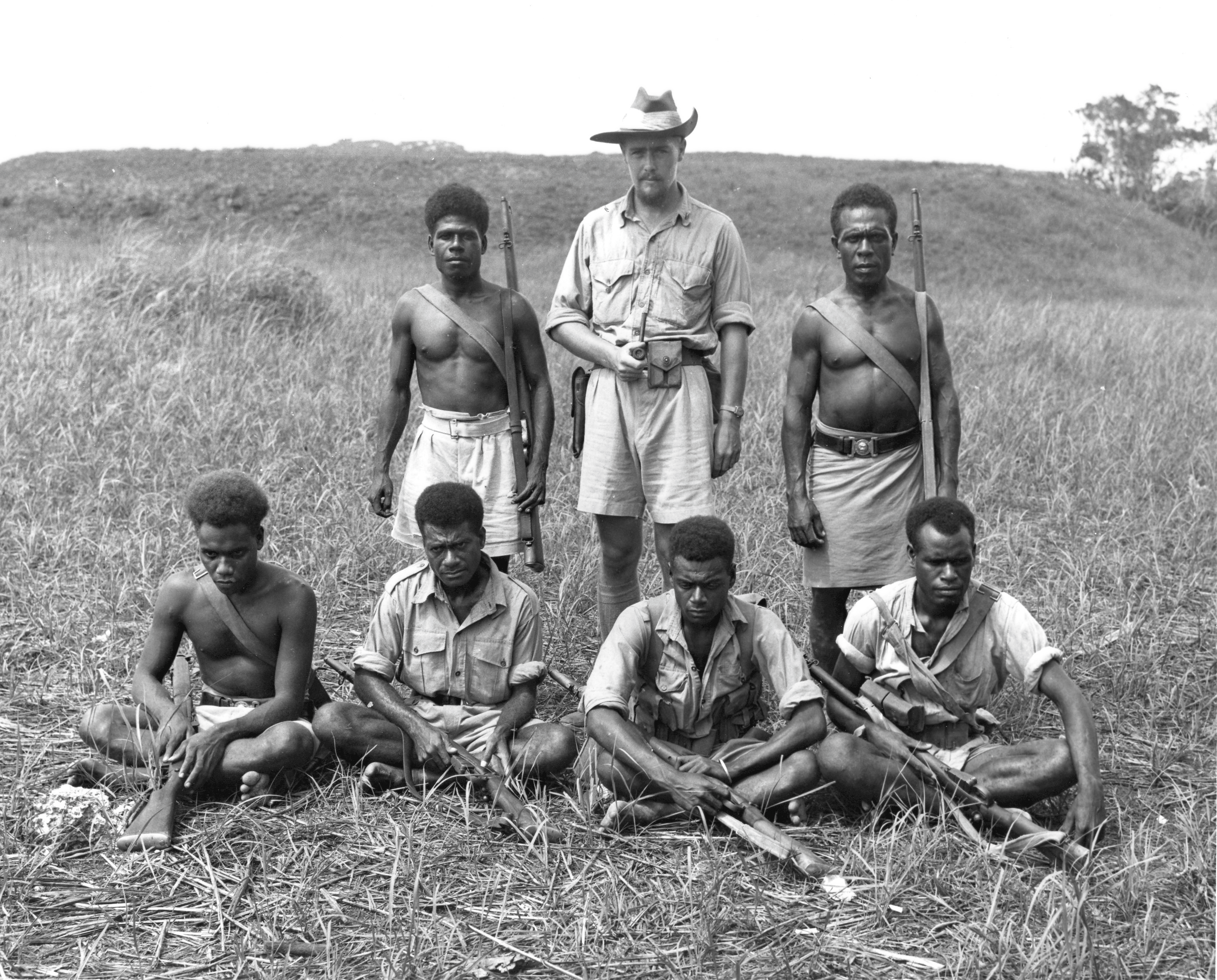
Captain Martin Clemens (centre, back) with six BSIPDF scouts, 1942

The British Solomon Islands Protectorate Defence Force (BSIPDF) was a British Colonial Auxiliary Forces unit raised in the British Solomon Islands during World War II. It was created following the outbreak of war with the Empire of Japan in 1942 and disbanded in 1946. The Solomon Islands has not maintained a military force since independence from British colonial rule in 1976, relying upon the Royal Solomon Islands Police Force for internal security.

== Role in World War II ==
Although the BSIPDF was very small, it played a significant role in the Solomon Islands campaign of World War II. The BSIPDF was commanded by the Solomon Islands' Resident Commissioner. During the Pacific War of 1942–1945 6,232 indigenous Solomon Islanders enlisted in the BSIPDF and served in battles such as the Battle of Guadalcanal, alongside Allied forces, fighting the Empire of Japan. Another 2,000 enrolled in the separate Solomon Islands Labour Corps. Allied Coastwatchers in the Solomon Islands often cooperated with or served alongside BSIPDF personnel during operations throughout the Solomon Islands campaign.

== Leadership ==
Prominent members of the BSIPDF included:

- Sir David Clive Crosbie Trench, MC, US Legion of Merit
- Martin Clemens, CBE, MC, AM
- Sir Jacob Vouza, MBE, GM, US Silver Star, US Legion of Merit
- Captain Donald Gilbert Kennedy, DSO, US Navy Cross

== Medical facilities ==
US Marine medical staff attached to the Guadalcanal landing were less familiar with local medical conditions in the southwest Pacific than they were with tropical Mesoamerica and Caribbean conditions, which they knew very well. The pre-war experience and malaria records of Dr. Edward Sayers In the Western Province of the Solomon Islands was helpful to the United States forces in reducing malaria rates during the Solomon Islands campaign.

Large numbers of sick combatants in their care were initially treated for dengue fever. They were persuaded by two factors to revise this initial diagnosis to favour malaria due to:

- Based on his pre-war medical work in the southern Solomons with the former British Colonial Administration, Lieutenant Frank Stackpool (Lieutenant, AIF Intelligence; later Lieutenant then Captain, British Solomon Island Protectorate Defence Force), an Australian guide to the US Marine landing at Tulagi, was present at Guadalcanal campaign headquarters to explain the British administration’s effective anti-malaria treatment policy and practices in the southern Solomons in the many years preceding the war.
- The Australian was also able to demonstrate that sick indigenous employees, for whom he was responsible, responded very well to malaria treatment in that tropical environment.

On seeing these successful results first-hand, US Marine medical staff very quickly adopted similar malaria treatment practices for their sick combatants in care.

The initial approach to treat for dengue fever instead of malaria is understandable given that deadly Plasmodium falciparum is the predominant malaria in the Solomon Islands but it was not so in places familiar to US Marine medical staff such as Panama, Costa Rica, El Salvador, Guatemala and Mexico, where less deadly Plasmodium vivax malaria predominated.

Both Mr Martin Clemens’ (CBE, MC, AM) book “Alone on Guadalcanal: A Coastwatcher's Story”, Annapolis Maryland, Naval Institute Press, 1998 and also Mr D.C. Horton’s book, “Fire Over the Islands”, Sydney, Reed, 1979, mentions Mr F. Stackpool as the Government Dispenser (i.e. Pharmacist/Chemist). In fact, Mr Stackpool, held this position in the former British Colonial Administration (Medical Service) from the year 1929 until 1942 at Tulagi and then 1943 to 1948 at Aola, later at Honiara in the Solomon Islands.
