= William John Read =

Australian Coast Watcher during World War II

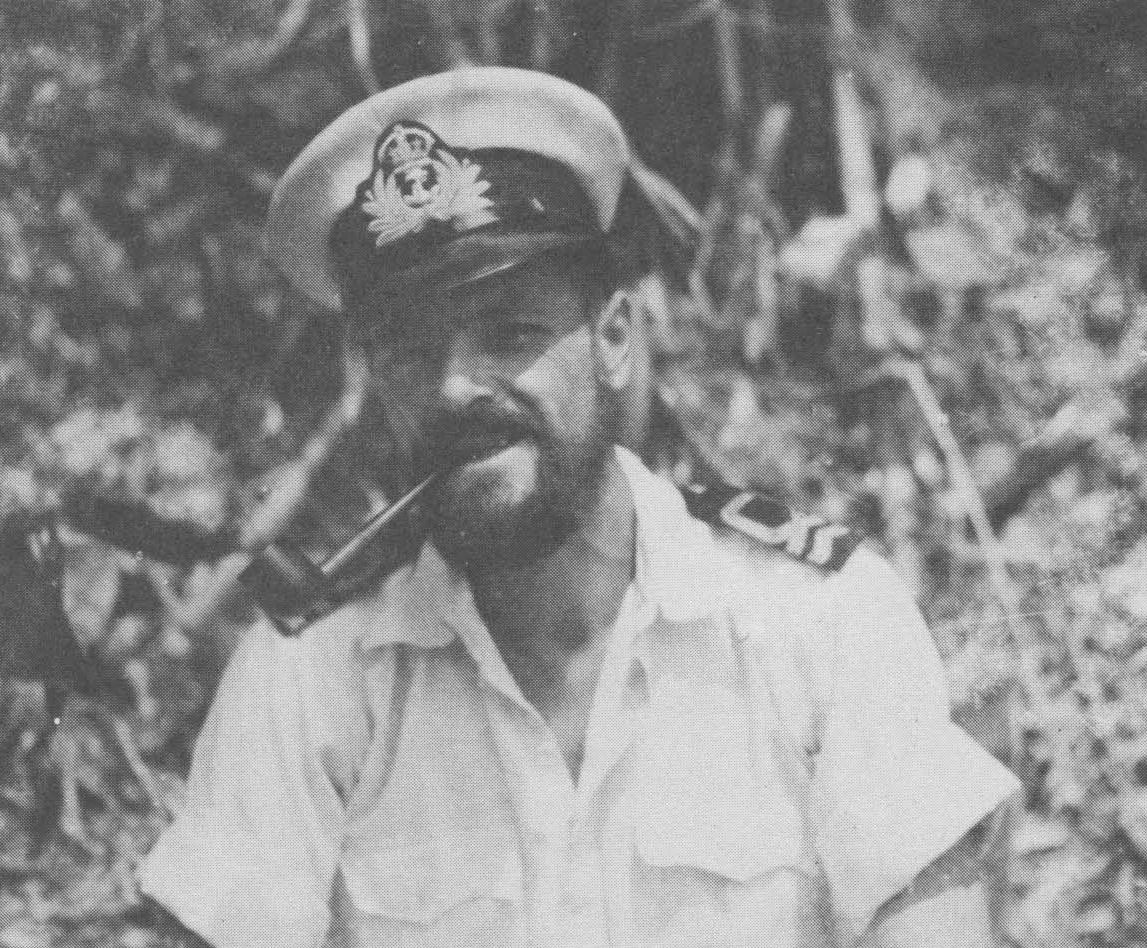
- Lieutenant Jack Read, 1943
- Born: September 18, 1905; Hobart, Tasmania (Australia)
- Died: June 29, 1992; Ballarat, Victoria (Australia)
- Occupations: Colonial official, Military officer, Civil Servant
- Years active: 1929-1963
- Known for: Coastwatcher

William John (Jack) Read (born 18 September 1905, Hobart, Tasmania, Australia; died 29 June 1992, Ballarat, Victoria (Australia)), was an Australian Coastwatcher on Bougainville Island in New Guinea during World War II. He was awarded the Distinguished Service Cross by the United States for his service during World War II in the Solomon Islands campaign and the New Guinea campaign. His experiences and reports have become an important source for historians regarding the history of the coastwatchers.

== Early life ==
Read was born on 18 September 1905 in Hobart to William George Read and Eleanor Elfridine, (née Absolom). He attended Hobart State High School and after worked as a bookkeeper. In 1929, he married Gwenneth Ballantyne before leaving for public service in the Mandated Territory of New Guinea. He and Gwen had one child together, Judith. Read served his cadetship in New Britain; in 1932 he was promoted to patrol officer and stationed in Madang. In 1936 he was promoted to assistant district officer and continued to serve in Madang, as well as Wau and Lae in the Morobe Province.

== World War II ==
Madang Province and its capital was first colonized by Germany in the late 19th century and German colonial rule lasted until the end of World War I. When World War II began in Europe, Australia began interning foreign nationals suspected of Axis sympathies. Read was involved in taking German and Italian miners into custody in preparation for their deportation and internment in Australia. He applied for release from colonial service to enter the military, but this was denied and he assigned to the Buka Passage sub-district and sent to Bougainville Island where his duties included coastwatching.

Read had risen to the rank of sergeant in the Australian New Guinea Administrative Unit; he was initially inclined to join the Second Australian Imperial Force in 1942 but was convinced by Eric Feldt, the naval intelligence officer in charge of the Coastwatcher service in New Guinea and the Solomons to remain in his post. Feldt had also been a district officer at Madang, and knew Read well from their mutual service. Shortly after this he was appointed as a lieutenant in the Royal Australian Naval Volunteer Reserve. In this position he created a coastwatching network in Bougainville to gather intelligence on Japanese movements. Due to his ideal position along the coast, his intelligence was to be especially valuable to the Allies during the initial phase of the Solomon Islands campaign. Ian W. Toll writes in The Conquering Tide: War in the Pacific Islands, 1942-1944:

For the second consecutive day, a coastwatcher had provided vital forewarning of an incoming airstrike. It was a pattern that would continue throughout the Solomons campaign. Every day, or nearly so, the Japanese sent airstrikes down from Rabaul—and every day, Jack Read or Paul Mason spotted the southbound formations overhead and relayed the warning. Read was especially well situated for this purpose because his vantage point at Porapora commanded a panoramic view of all of Buka Island to the north, the eastern sea channels leading down the “Slot” (the body of water between the double file of islands that formed the Solomons archipelago), and the skies through which Japanese aircraft must pass.

This vital information denied the Japanese the advantage of a surprise attack and gave the Allies time to prepare for the incoming Japanese airstrike, by defensively dispersing their ships, manning anti-aircraft stations, and having their fighters in the air and ready to defend the fleet and the landings against the attack.

The Japanese were aware of the intelligence-gathering activities of the coastwatches and it became a top priority to find and capture them; as spies, they would have been quickly executed if they weren't killed during their capture for their activities. Read was nearly killed on one occasion and had to change locations often. He was constantly assisted by local villagers who both helped him evade capture, assisted with his intelligence-gathering activities, and provided him with priceless knowledge of the local environment. Eventually with the Japanese closing in on him, he was evacuated by the United States in July 1943 on the submarine USS Guardfish, which also rescued other coastwatchers and Australian civilians.

One of Read's final acts before being evacuated was to coordinate and assist with the evacuation of the civilians who had assisted him. On July 24, the day he was supposed to have been evacuated he discovered that no plans had been made to evacuate the indigenous police and civilians who had served with him. Having risked their lives for him, Read stated "There was no way I was going to leave without them." The Guardfish returned on July 30 and Read, along with the indigenous peoples who had assisted him, were evacuated.

On October 7, 1942, Read was awarded the Distinguished Service Cross by the United States for "extraordinary heroism" in service to the United States for his intelligence gathering during the Solomon Islands landing. Admiral William F. Halsey, the United States Navy commander for the South Pacific, stated that the intelligence gathered by Read on Bougainville had "saved Guadalcanal and that Guadalcanal had saved the South Pacific" Read was never honored by Australia or Britain for his service, a slight he attributed to prejudice against irregulars by the Australian Navy.

Read was commissioned as a Major by the Australian Imperial Forces in September 1944 and served in the Australian New Guinea Administrative Unit as acting district officer on Bougainville.

== Post World War II ==
After the war, Read joined the administration of the Territory of Papua and New Guinea in the position of assistant district officer. He was stationed in Kavieng, New Ireland. He remained in this position until May 3, 1951, to take up a civilian appointment in Melbourne with the Department of the Navy. However, he was unsatisfied with life away from Papua New Guinea and returned in 1952 to take up a position as Native (indigenous) Land Commissioner. In this position, he researched local indigenous histories and determined the land rights of individuals or communities based on hereditary or customary rights. He retired from this position in 1975 and left for Australia when Papua New Guinea gained independence. He retained his commission with the Australian Naval Reserve, was promoted to lieutenant commander in 1950 and eventually retired from naval service in 1963.

In Australia, he would live in Melbourne with his wife pursuing his interest in photography. After over 50 years of marriage, his wife Gwen died in 1980, and he moved to Ballarat to be close to his only child, Judith. After an extended illness, he died of lung disease on 29 June 1992 at Ballarat and was cremated.

== See also ==
- Axis naval activity in Australian waters
- Fleet Radio Unit
- Fleet Radio Unit, Melbourne
- Military history of Australia during World War II
- New Guinea Air Warning Wireless
- South West Pacific theatre of World War II

Individual Coastwatchers

- Martin Clemens
- Paul Mason (coastwatcher)
- Arthur Reginald Evans
- Jacob C. Vouza
