= James McManus (Royal Australian Navy) =

Royal Australian Navy officer

- Birth name: James Cathal Boyd McManus
- Born: 11 March 1891; Echuca, Victoria
- Died: 1972; St Leonards, New South Wales
- Allegiance: Australia
- Commands: Coastwatchers
- Battles / wars: First World War; Second World War
- Awards: Officer of the Order of the British Empire

Commander James Cathal Boyd McManus OBE, RAN (a.k.a. Tom, 11 March 1891 – 1972) was an officer in the Royal Australian Navy. He commanded the Coastwatchers from 1943 until the end of World War II.

== Early life ==
Born to Margaret Helen Alexandrina Boyd and Arthur Corrigan McManus on 11 March 1891, McManus' brother Rondal Arthur was born two years later in 1893. The family lived in Echuca, Victoria in Australia.

McManus' father died suddenly in 1894. His mother Margaret took her infant children James and Rondal to live near their uncle and aunt, John Reed McManus and Caroline McManus, in Neutral Bay in New South Wales.

McManus' uncle, John, sailed with the China Navigation Company and inspired the young James McManus' lifelong love of the sea.

== Family ==
McManus married Vera Spedding in 1915. They had two children, Terence and June.

McManus was widowed in 1950 and married Louise Zimmerman in 1965.

He is a cousin to Emily MacManus.

== Service ==
McManus was an officer in the Royal Australian Navy in World War I and World War II.

During World War II he served in Naval Intelligence. The Director of Naval Intelligence was Commander R. B. M. Long. McManus was stationed at HMAS Cerberus (naval base), HMAS Yarra, HMAS Penguin, HMAS Melville (naval base), HMAS Basilisk and HMAS Moreton.

McManus took command of the Coastwatchers in 1943 after Commander Eric Feldt succumbed to illness. Feldt describes him in his book The Coast Watchers as Long's "... most experienced man ..." and as:

... a small, wiry man with very grey hair which had been jet black once. As time went on, he showed a grasp of the problems and an ability to solve them. Before long, his tact, patience and consideration won the loyalty and warm regard of ... the Islanders.

— Eric Feldt, The Coast Watchers (1946)

The change of command came at a sensitive time, only months before the MV Krait made its mission into Singapore Harbour for Operation Jaywick. However, as Walter Lord notes in his book Lonely Vigil: Coastwatchers of the Solomons, McManus was:

... a wiry Australian with long experience in both intelligence and the South Seas. It might have been a disaster – Feldt has such close ties with so many of his men – but McManus proved a skillful, tactful replacement.

— Walter Lord, Lonely Vigil: Coastwatchers of the Solomons (1977)

McManus was awarded an OBE in 1946.

His ashes were scattered from the MV Krait after his death in 1972.
