= Ephraim Jubilee =

Nominated Member of the Legislative Council
- In office 1961–1964

Personal details
- Died: 24 October 1979 (aged 54); Rabaul, Papua New Guinea

Ephraim Jubilee (died 24 October 1979) was a Papua New Guinean educator, magistrate and politician. He was a member of the Legislative Council from 1961 until 1964.

== Biography ==
A Tolai from Ratavul village, Jubilee attended Nodup school and subsequently trained to be a teacher at Kerevat Education Centre. He started work as a teacher in 1941 and remained in the profession for 27 years. He was appointed to the Legislative Council following the 1961 elections, serving until 1964. Shortly after his election, he was made a member of the Australian delegation to the United Nations Trusteeship Council.

In 1968 Jubilee was appointed a magistrate in Rabaul. Following independence, he contested the Rabaul Open seat in the 1977 elections, but finished third behind John Kaputin and Albert Burua. In January 1978 he was appointed a District Supervising Magistrate of the village courts in East Britain.

Married with seven children, he died in Rabaul in October 1979 following a long illness.
