= Martin Clemens =

British-Australian colonial administrator and military officer

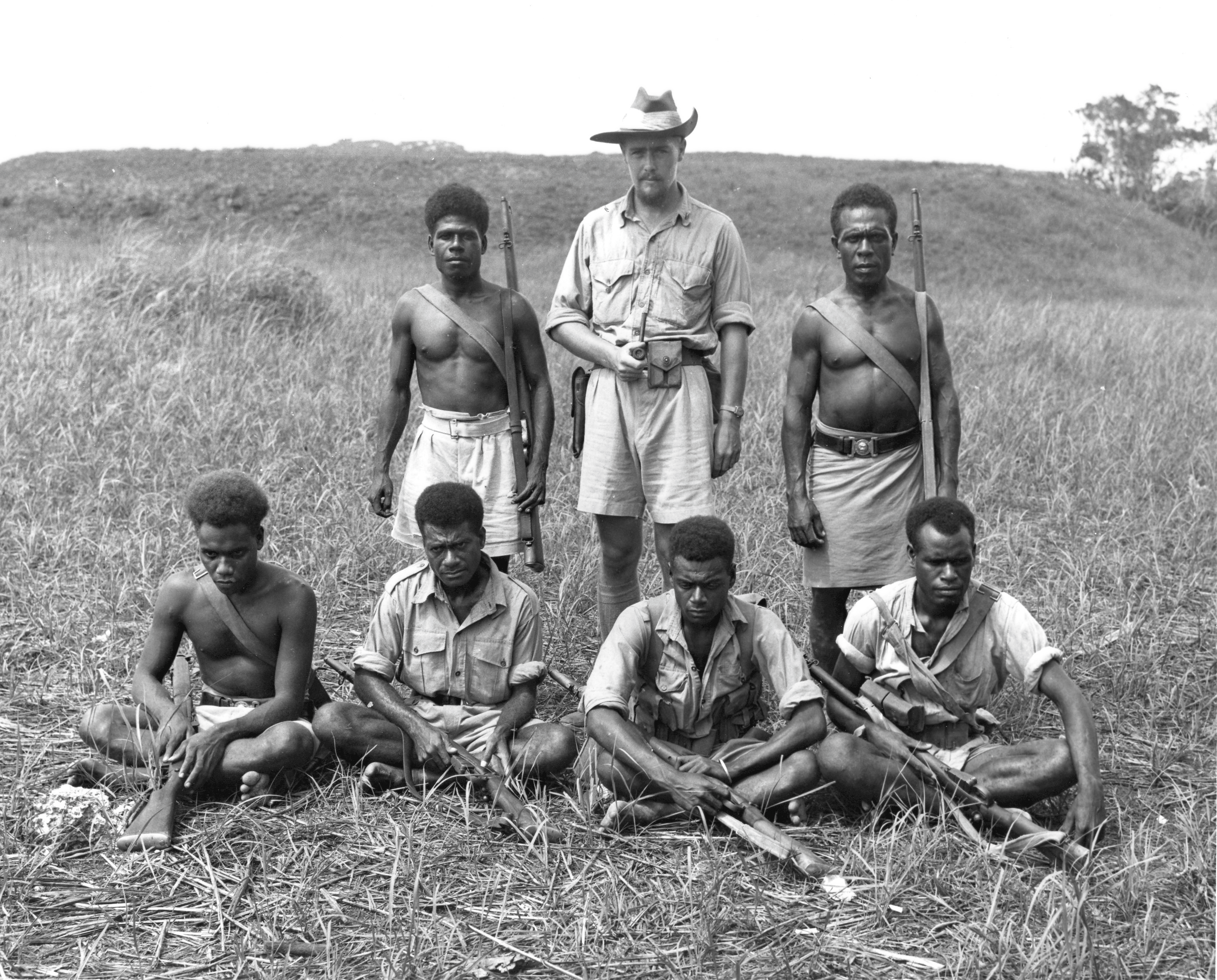
- Martin Clemens and his Solomon scouts.
- Born: 17 April 1915; Aberdeen, Scotland
- Died: 31 May 2009 (aged 94)
- Military career
- Allegiance: British Solomon Islands
- Branch: British Solomon Islands Protectorate Defence Force
- Service years: 1941–1945
- Rank: Major
- Conflicts: Second World War: Solomon Islands campaign; Guadalcanal Campaign
- Awards: Commander of the Order of the British Empire; Member of the Order of Australia; Military Cross; Legion of Merit (United States)

Major Warren Frederick Martin Clemens CBE, AM, MC (17 April 1915 – 31 May 2009) was a British-Australian colonial administrator and military officer. In late 1941 and early 1942, while serving as a District Officer in the Solomon Islands, he helped prepare the area for eventual resistance to Japanese occupation. His additional duties as a coastwatcher alerted the Allies to Japanese plans to build an airstrip on Guadalcanal. This resulted in Allied carrier raids and eventually a landing by United States forces and the beginning of the epic struggle in the Solomons. Clemens then directly served the U.S. Marines in coordinating intelligence on Japanese activities.

== Early life ==
Martin Clemens was born in Aberdeen, Scotland, son of Warren Clemens, a musician. He won scholarships to Bedford School and Christ's College, Cambridge, where he studied agriculture and natural sciences from 1933 to 1937.

== Early career ==
In 1938, Clemens joined the Colonial Service and was sent out to the British Solomon Islands Protectorate (BSIP). He served for three years as a cadet in Malaita, and became a District Officer in 1941.

With the coming of the Pacific War, he volunteered for military service in the British Solomon Islands Protectorate Defence Force and was commissioned a captain. After a short leave in Australia in late 1941, Martin Clemens returned to the Solomons on a ship sent to evacuate European and Chinese residents from Guadalcanal.

== Second World War ==
While responsible for nearly fifteen thousand citizens and various other people on Guadalcanal, District Officer Clemens additionally served as a coastwatcher. The Japanese planned to cut off the United States' communications with New Zealand and Australia by building an airstrip on Guadalcanal. When they began landing infantry, support troops and engineers to begin the airstrip, Clemens reported such to the Allies by radio.

Meanwhile, the managers of the coconut plantations had fled Guadalcanal in panic, abandoning the native workers from neighboring islands, who were left to be repatriated by Clemens. He then established his radio station and coastwatching activities. Though he was a commissioned officer, Clemens received no support from the military and had no uniform. After the Japanese occupied the island of Tulagi in early May, they initiated searches for Clemens, and the other Guadalcanal coastwatchers Donald S. Macfarlan, Kenneth D. Hay, Hugh A. Mackenzie, Leif Schroeder, and F. Ashton Rhoades. In June, the Japanese started constructing an airfield on Guadalcanal, further isolating Clemens and forcing him to conduct his activities from enclaves in the mountains. Clemens, on his jungle-shielded mountain, played a dangerous game of hide and seek with the Japanese. He and his tiny coastwatcher contingent were running low on everything they needed: food, supplies, and most critically, radio batteries. Barefoot, Clemens shared the privations of his coastwatchers. His shoes had disintegrated.

Guadalcanal became the site of the first major land offensive against the Japanese in the South Pacific. Upon the American invasion of Guadalcanal, Clemens and his scouts were ordered to join the Marines at Lunga on 13 August. Cooperation between Clemens and the U.S. Marines made him a key operative on the island. Major General Alexander Vandegrift gave Clemens "complete charge of all matters of native administration and of intelligence outside the perimeter". Clemens and his scouts provided the U.S. Marines much assistance with continuous raids on Japanese supplies and radio reports of the enemy's position.

== Post-war ==
His war service earned him the Military Cross (MC) on 15 December 1942, and in 1944 the U.S. Legion of Merit. The First Marine Division also awarded him the commemorative Faciat Georgius medal, which he helped design.

Following the war, Clemens served in Palestine in 1946–1947 and Cyprus in 1948–1949, returning to Cyprus in 1951–1957 as District Commissioner, and was Defence Secretary during 1959–1960. Offered a further colonial position variously reported as having been in Burma or Sarawak, he instead moved to Australia, which was home to his wife Anne. This later colonial career led to his appointment as Officer of the Order of the British Empire (OBE) in the 1956 Queen's Birthday Honours, and promotion to Commander in that order (CBE) in the 1960 New Year Honours.

Clemens became an Australian citizen in 1961 and was involved in numerous public service and charity efforts. According to the official Australian Government online database of honours, he was appointed Member of the Order of Australia (AM) in 1993, but obituaries report this honour as the lesser Medal of the Order of Australia (OAM).

== Personal life ==
Martin Clemens married Anne Turnbull in 1948. They had four children.

== See also ==
- William John Read
- Jacob C. Vouza
- Arthur Reginald Evans
