= Rove, Honiara =

Rove
- Suburb
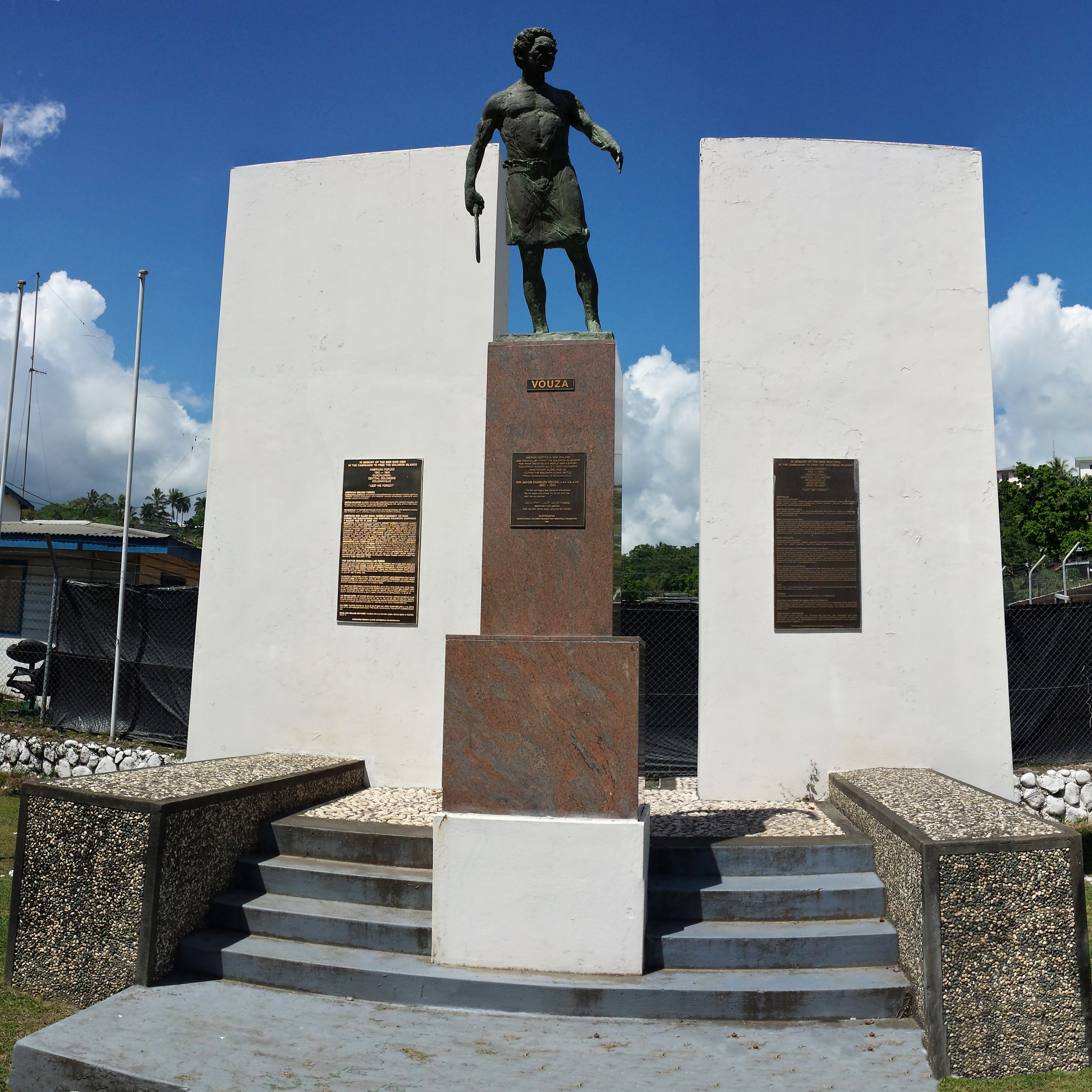
- Sir Jacob Vouza memorial at Rove, Honiara Solomon Islands

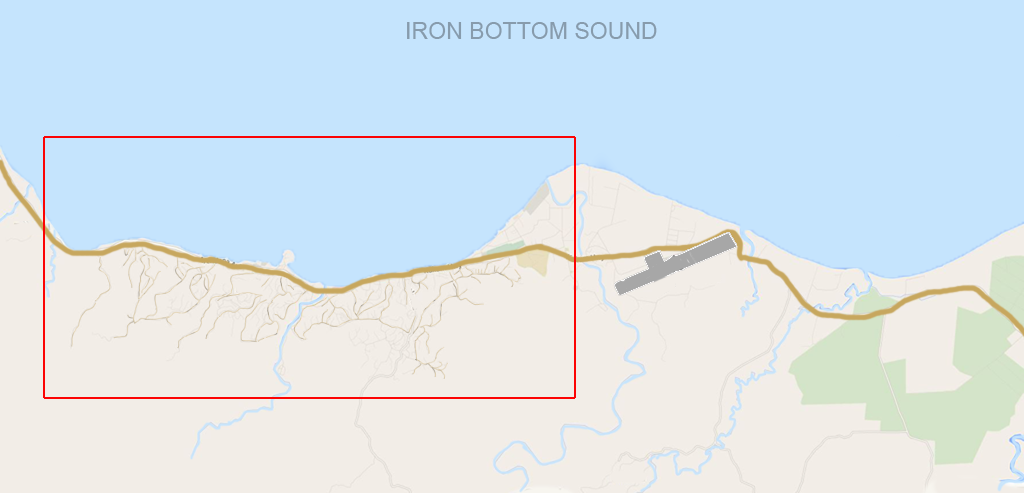
- Location in Honiara (Council boundary-red box)
- Coordinates: 9°26′S 159°56′E
- Country: Solomon Islands
- Province: Honiara Town
- Island: Guadalcanal
- Elevation: 29–100 m (95–328 ft)

Population (2009)
  - Total: 2,613
- Time zone: UTC+11 (UTC)

Rove is a suburb in Honiara, Solomon Islands, located 2 kilometres (1.2 mi) west of the main center on the Tandai Highway. Rove borders the Honiara City Council ward of Nggosi and Rove-Lengakiki.

Rove is East of Tanaghai and West of Town Ground.

== Law enforcement ==
=== Rove Solomon Islands Police Armory ===
Previous audits of the Solomon Islands Police armory in Rove were conducted by New Zealand Defence in 1997 and August and November 1999 and the results of these audits were 865, 961 and 881 weapons respectively that were stored in this facility. In 2000, as a precursor to RAMSI, the International Peace Monitoring Team (IPMT) conducted another audit with numbers ranging from 320 weapons (December 2000) to 222 weapons (May 2002).

On 5 June 2000 during the tension period the newly formed Malaita Eagle Force with the help of serving police officers, raided the Central armory at Rove and then effected a coup and removed the Prime Minister.

During the deployment of the Australian-led IPMT, 2050 weapons were collected which included 152 high powered weapons originally belonging to the Royal Solomon Islands Police. In mid-June 2002 the IPMT assisted Solomon Islands authorities dispose of weapons collected under the Townsville Peace Agreement with remains stored under a monument in Police Memorial Park. Weapons include SR-88A assault rifles and Ultimax 100 machine guns.

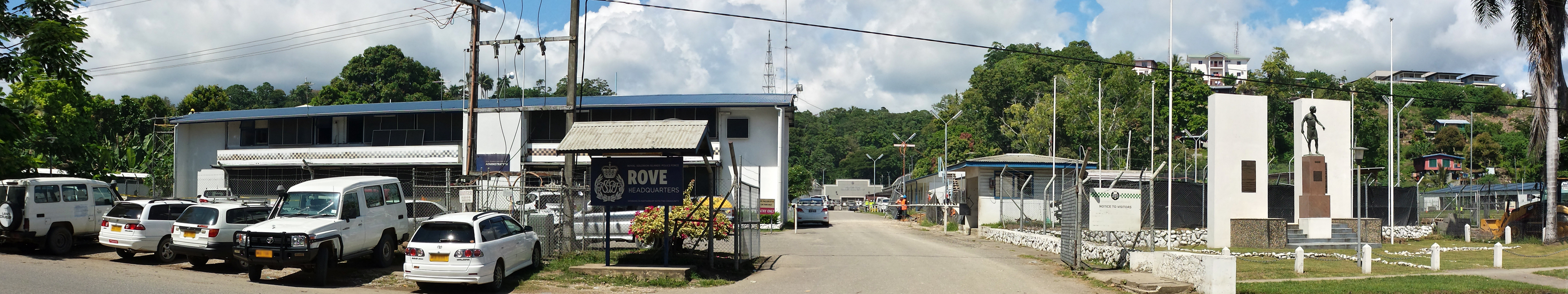
Rove Police HQ, Academy and Correctional center. Sir Jacob Vouza memorial to the right. Prison to the rear

=== Rove prison ===
On 5 October 2012 three people escaped from the Correctional Services Facility at Rove.

In March 2012, 192 prisoners were involved in a violent confrontation with the prison service over the weekend at Rove Prison. Damages to prison premises is estimated at SBD$2 million (US$272,000).

In 2012 an attachment of two members from the Correctional Service of Solomon Islands (CSSI) joined the Office of the Chief Inspector for nine days in April to see how Queensland Corrective Services inspects and reports on prison performance.

=== Rove police academy and barracks ===
In 1958 the police depot had 3 gazetted officers, 4 inspectors, 4 sub-inspectors and 201 Constables with European officers stationed at Headquarters

Renovation and refurbishment of existing Royal Solomon Islands Police Force buildings at Rove commenced in 2009.

In 2008 the New Zealand Government in partnership with RAMSI and the Solomon Islands Government constructed new houses for the police to ensuring a functional police force across the country.

== Culture ==
=== Botanical Gardens ===
The Rove Botanical Gardens is located immediately behind the Rove Prison.

=== Memorials ===
HMAS Canberra Memorial In August 1942, HMAS Canberra was wrecked by torpedoes and gunfire during the Battle of Savo Island. The original memorial to HMAS Canberra in the Solomon Islands was located in the grounds of Vilu Private Museum and was destroyed a few years ago during tensions in the country. The memorial and plaque is now located at the Police Memorial Park, Honiara. In 2008 the Overseas Privately Constructed Memorials Restoration Program provided funds to the HMAS Canberra/Shropshire Association to restore the memorial.

Jacob C. Vouza Memorial Sir Jacob C. Vouza (1900–1984) was made an honorary Sergeant Major of the United States Marine Corps in 1941 for his services assisting the Marines during the Guadalcanal campaign. The memorial is located outside the Rove police HQ site.

=== Solomon Islands Broadcasting Corporation ===
The headquarters of SIBS is located at Rove

A 2012 project to build the capacity of Solomon Islands media budgeted at US$14 300.00 aimed to strengthen the skills of media workers in all provinces of the countries in areas such as basic news writing, scripting for current affairs, or how to differentiate between news and non news.

=== Sport ===
The Rove field hosts the annual Inter-Ministry Soccer and Volleyball league consisting of 86 teams including the Royal Solomon Islands Police Force, Ministry of Police, National Security and Correctional Services.

- Lengakiki Warriors (Soccer club)

== Amenities ==
=== Rove Markets ===
Rove market is 5 kilometres (3.1 mi) from Central Market and 5 kilometres (3.1 mi) from the White River Market and subject to council closures.

=== Health clinics ===
Honiara City has 8 General Health Clinics and only Kukum and Rove are opening during weekends and public holidays.

The two clinics, Kukum and Rove, are upper clinics called "Area Health Clinics (AHC)"given more human and material resources by the government compared to other six clinics called "Urban Health Clinics (UHC)". AHC are expected to work as "gate keepers" before patients are referred to the central hospital in Honiara

=== Schools ===
- St. John's Community High School
- Rove boarding school
- Tamlan Primary School
- Bishop Epalle School

== Gallery ==
Photos of Rove
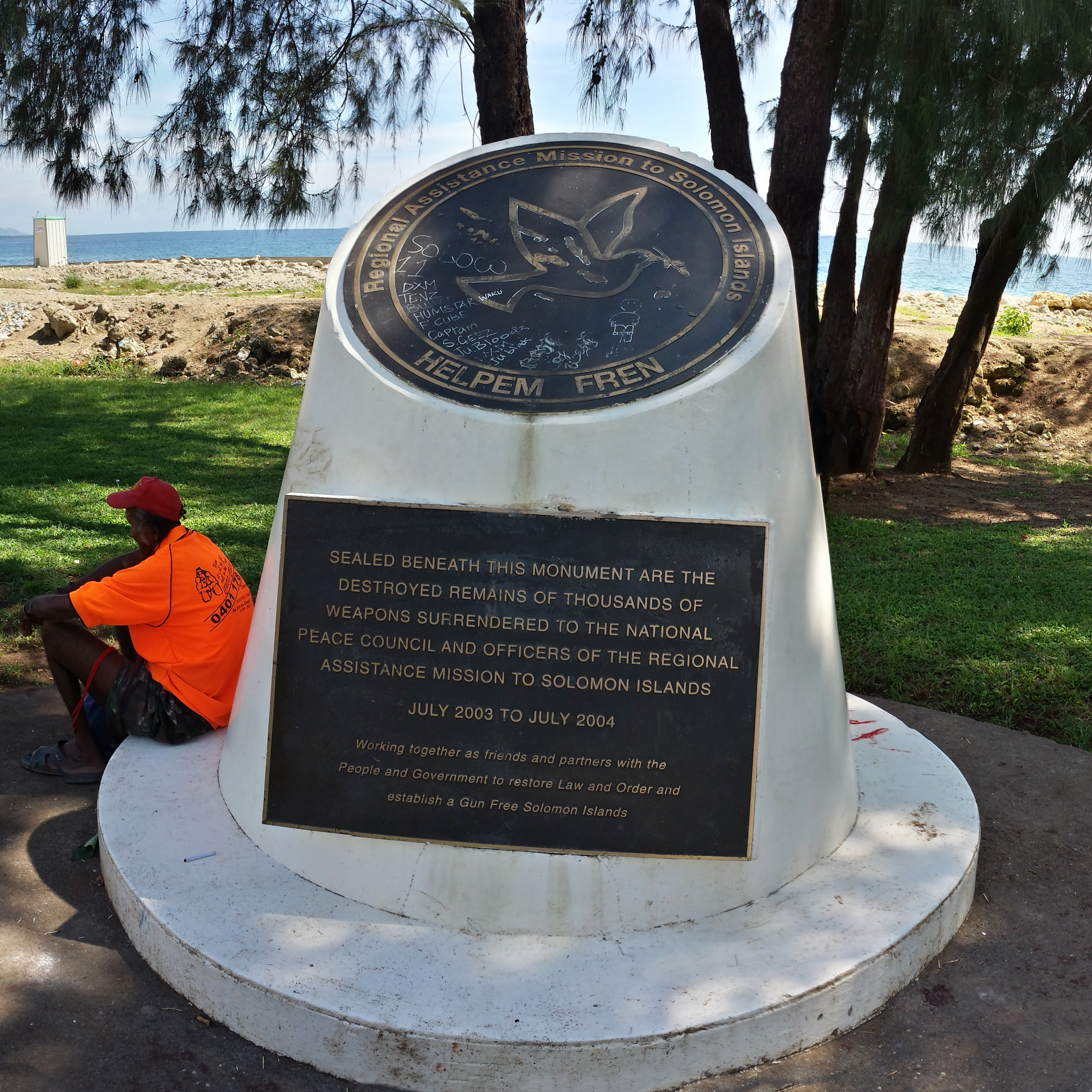
RAMSI memorial, under which are the destroyed firearms from the tensions.

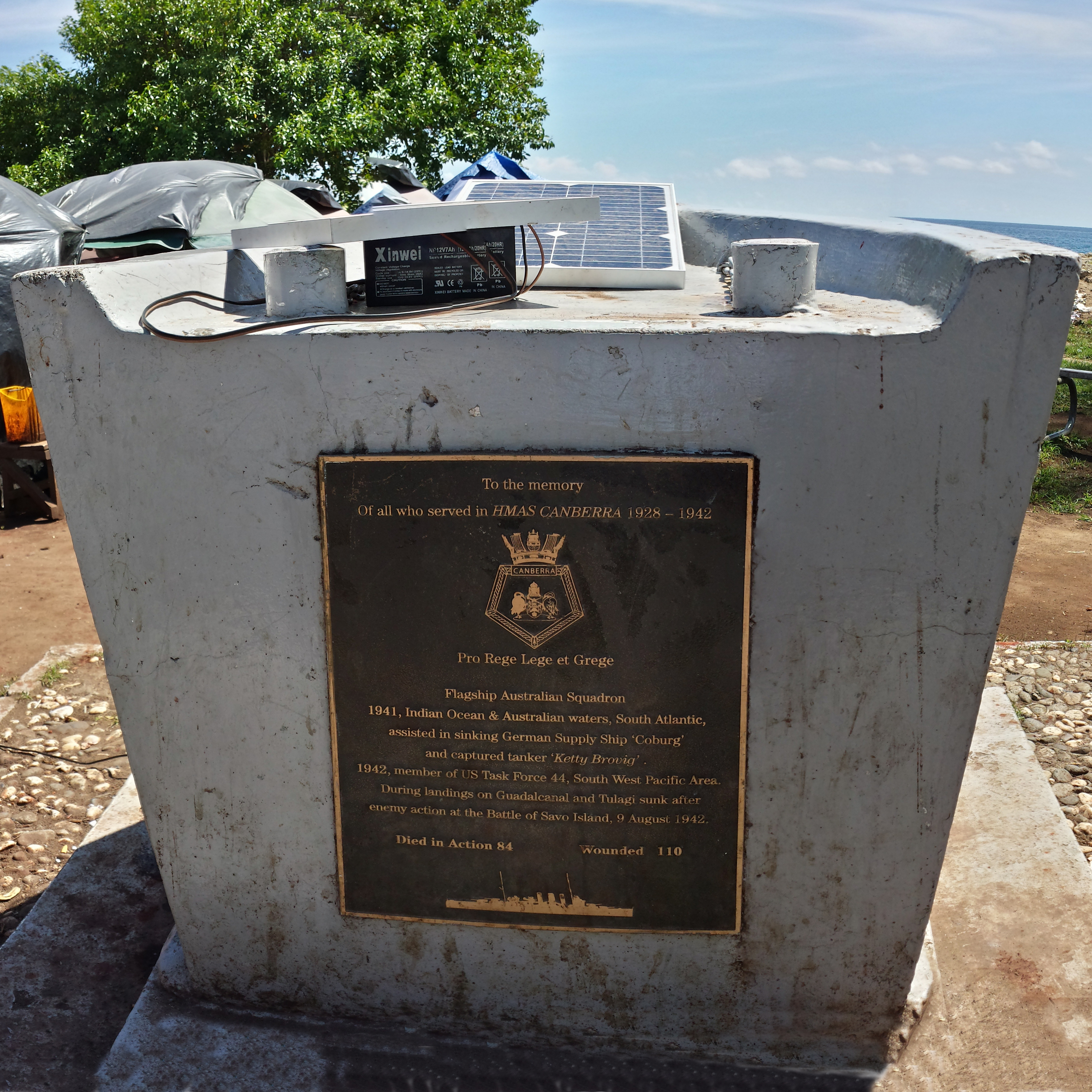
HMAS Canberra memorial.

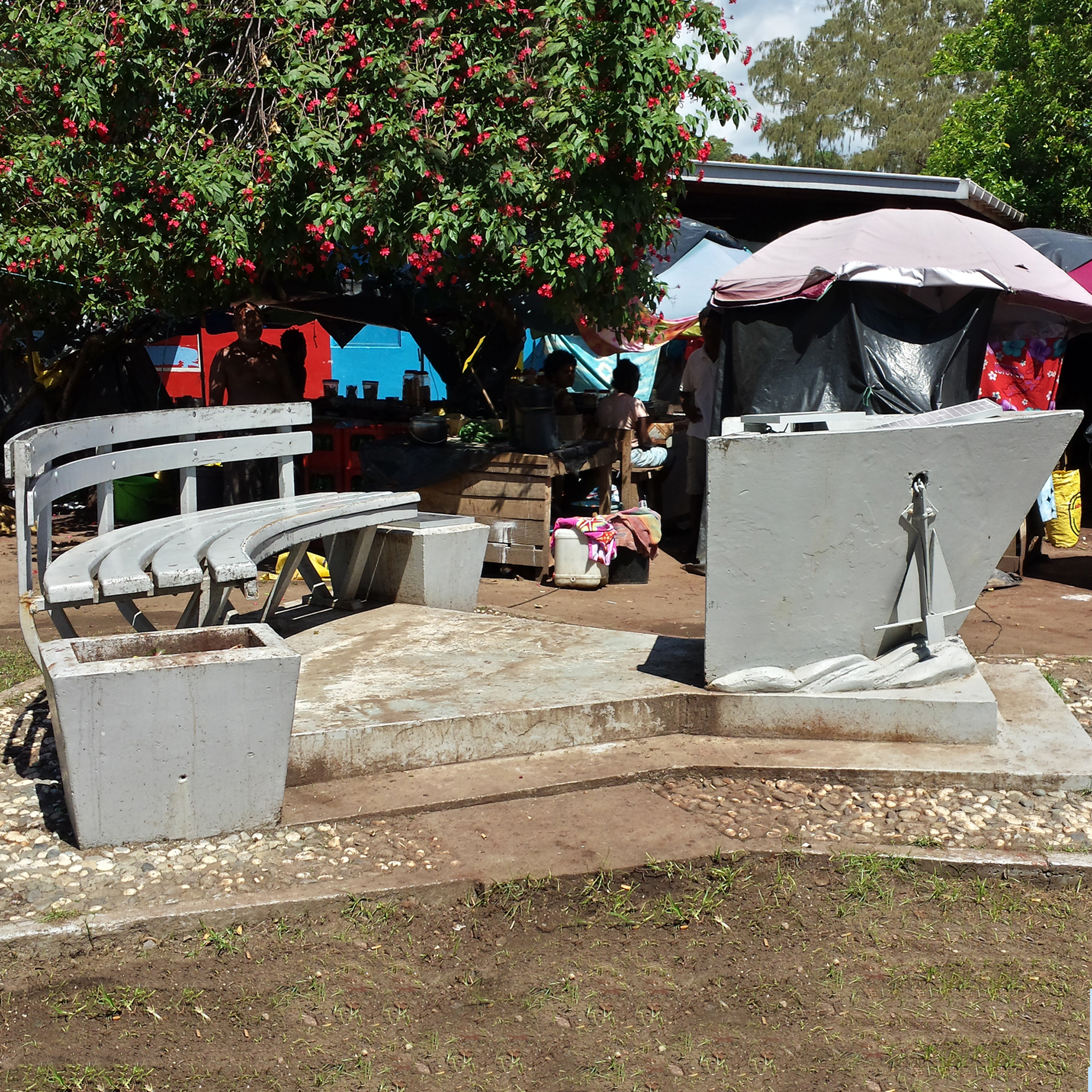
HMAS Canberra memorial.

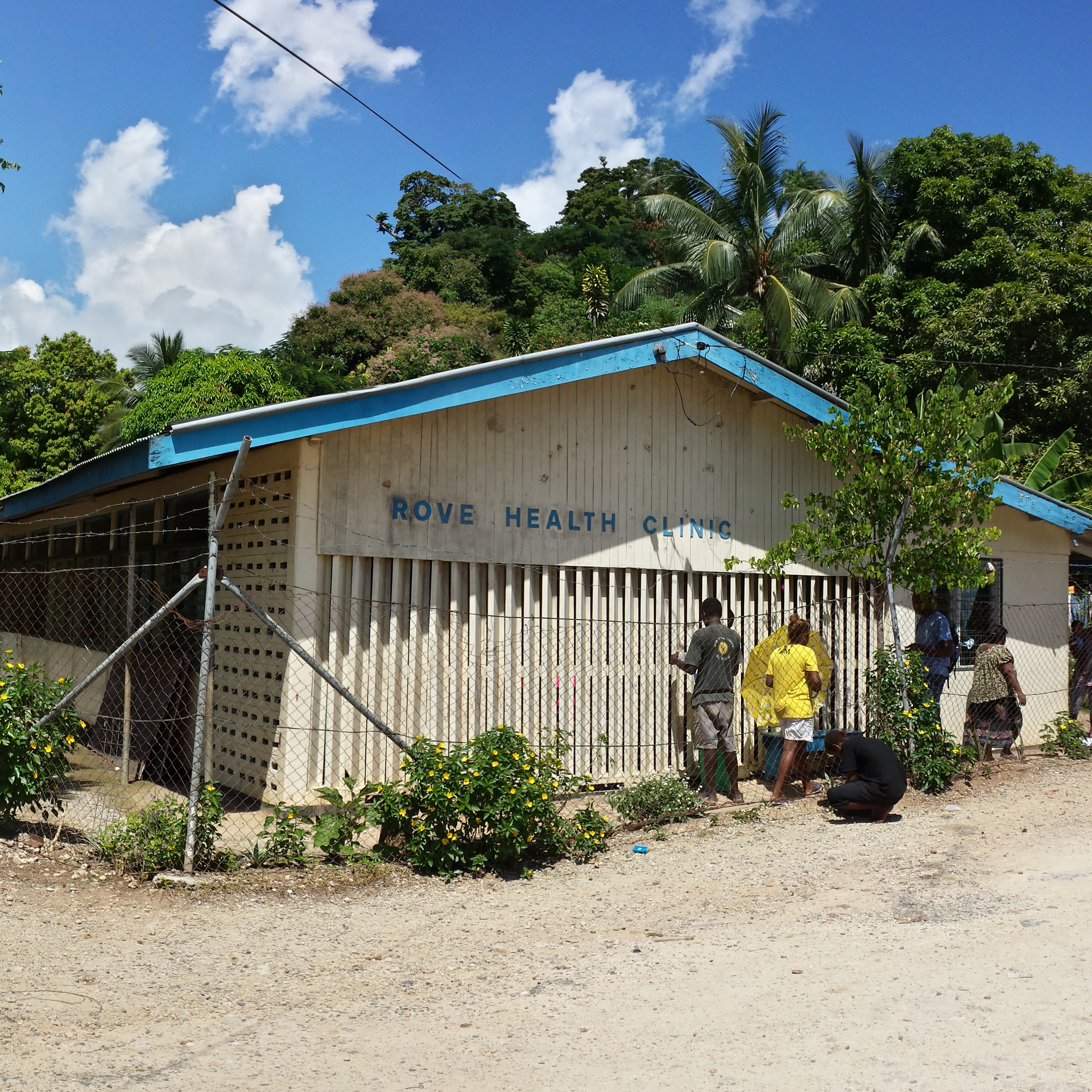
Health Clinic at Rove

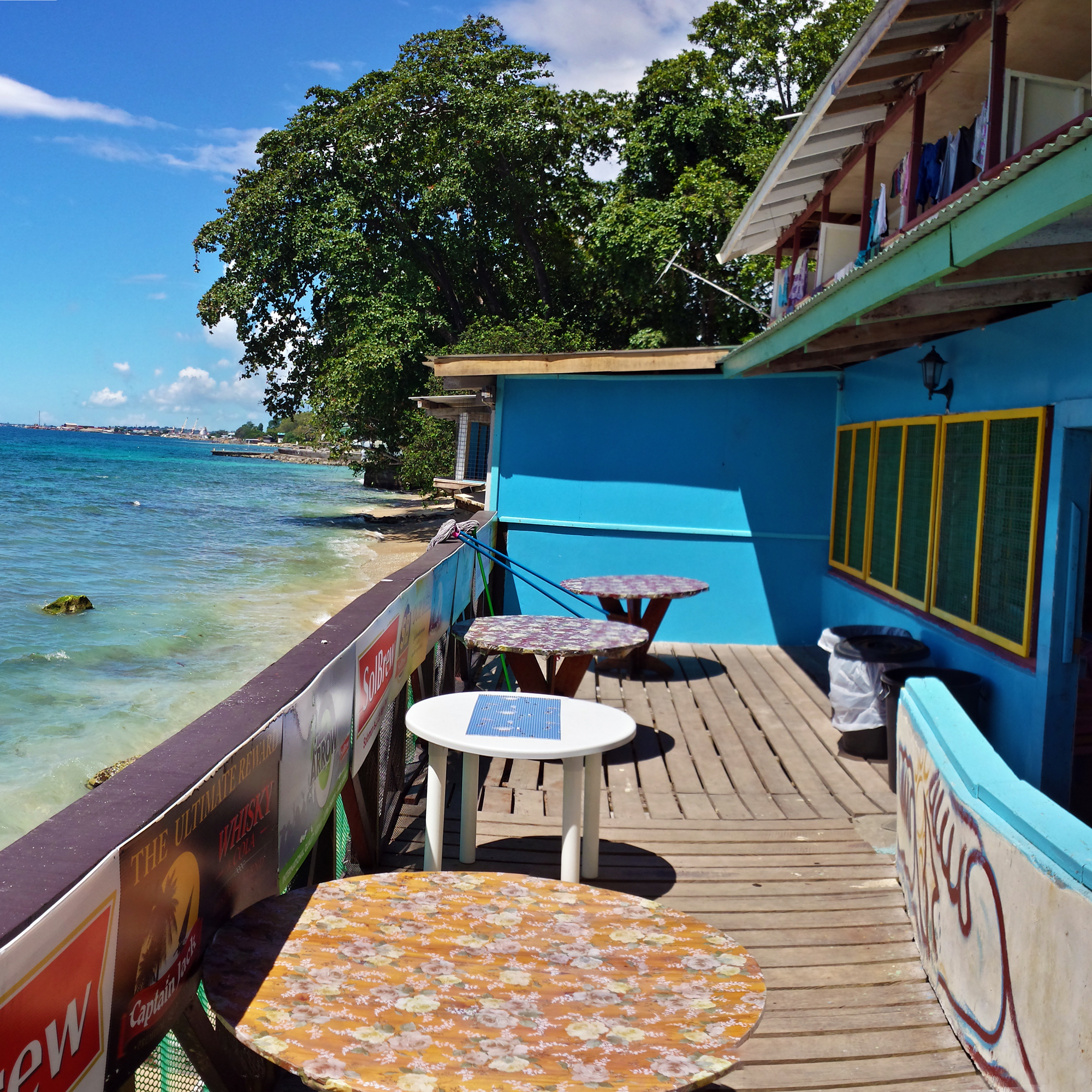
Tropicana Motel
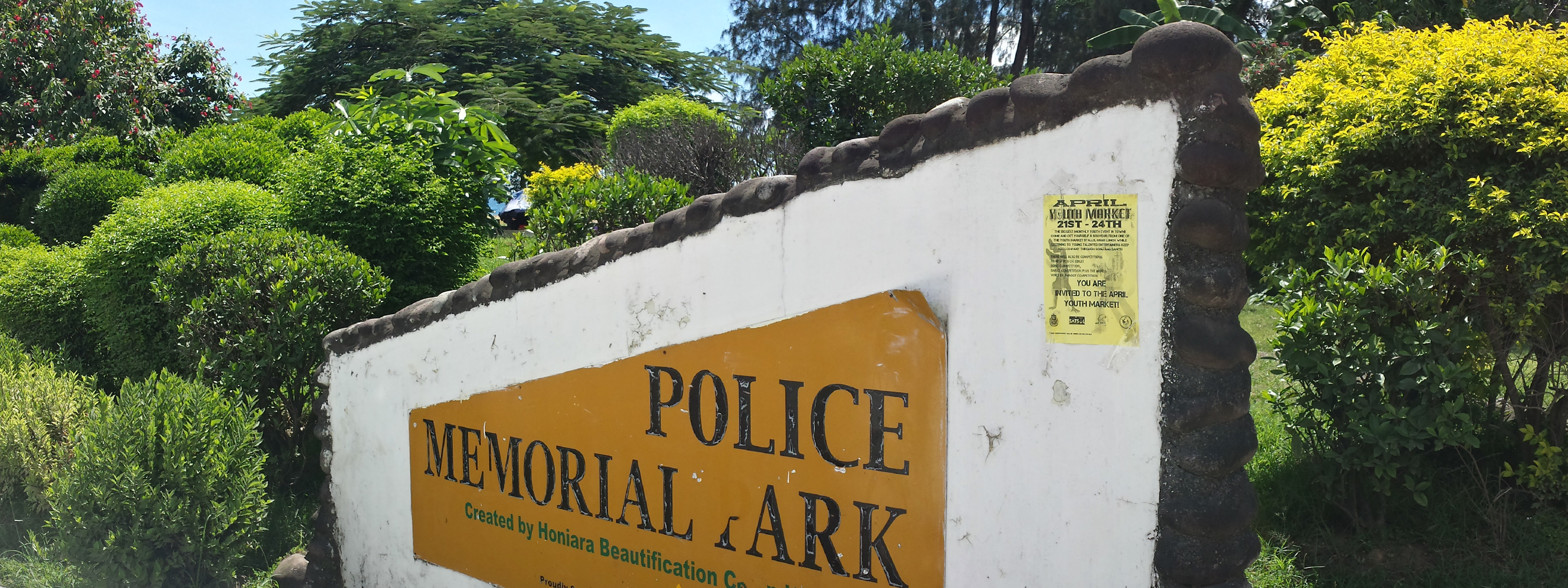
Police Memorial Park, Rove, Honiara Solomon Islands

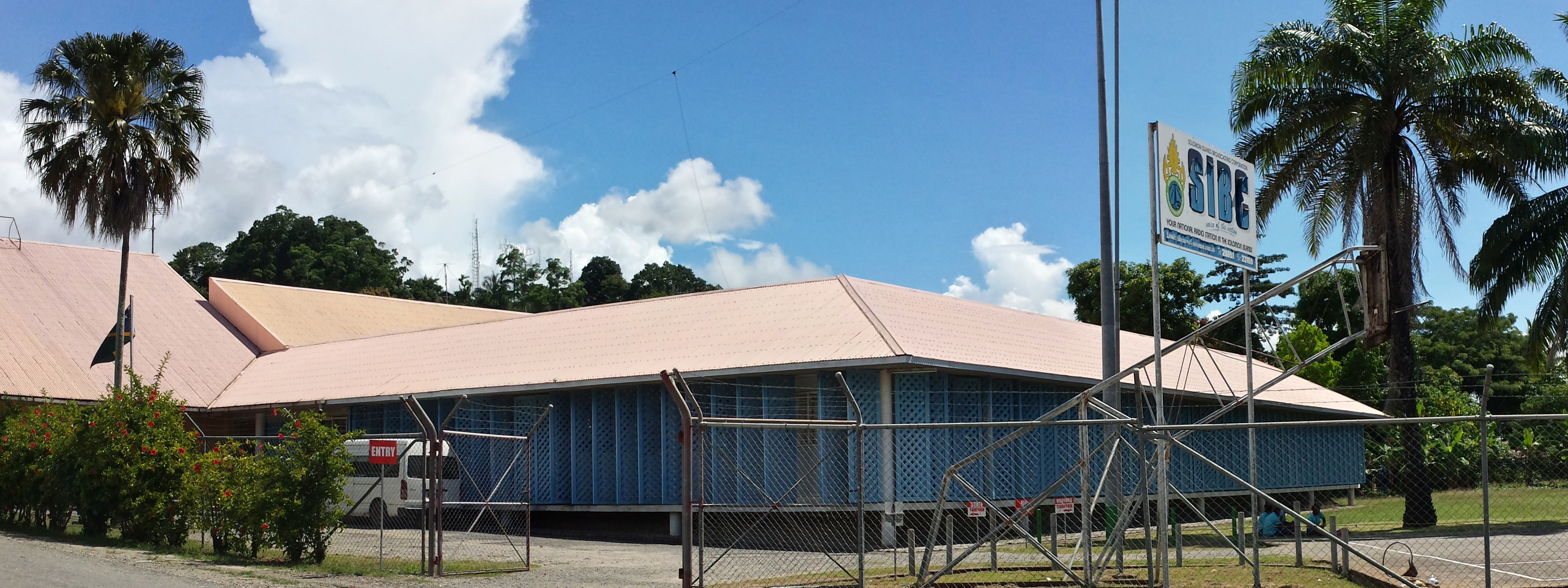
Solomon Islands Broadcasting

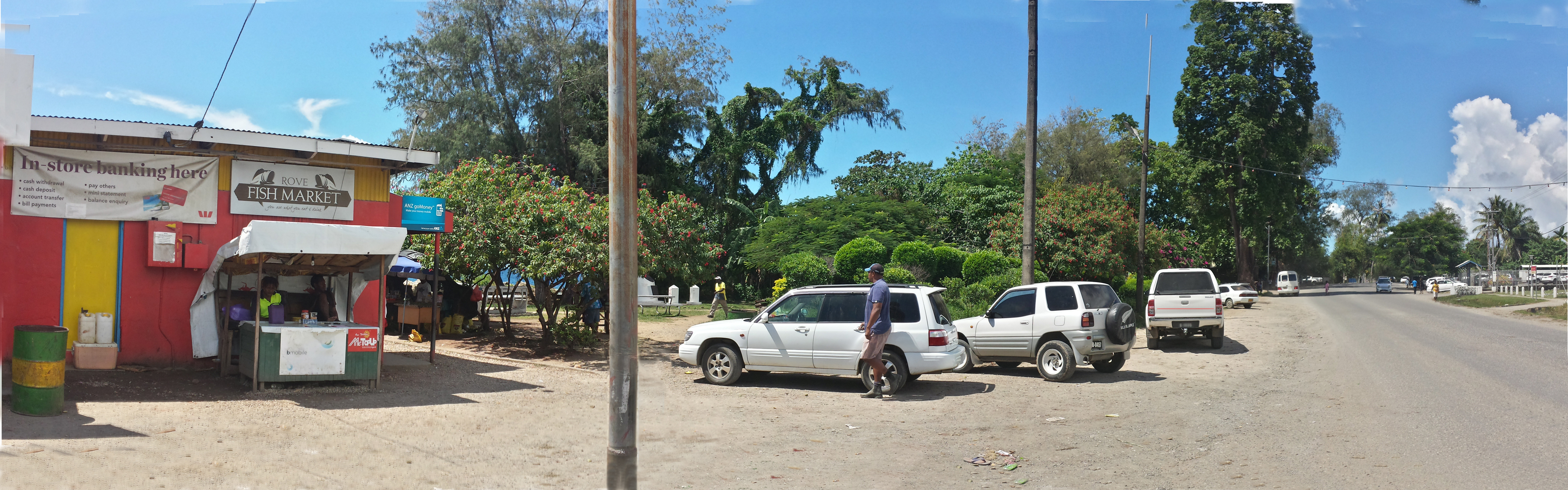
Rove markets and fish markets
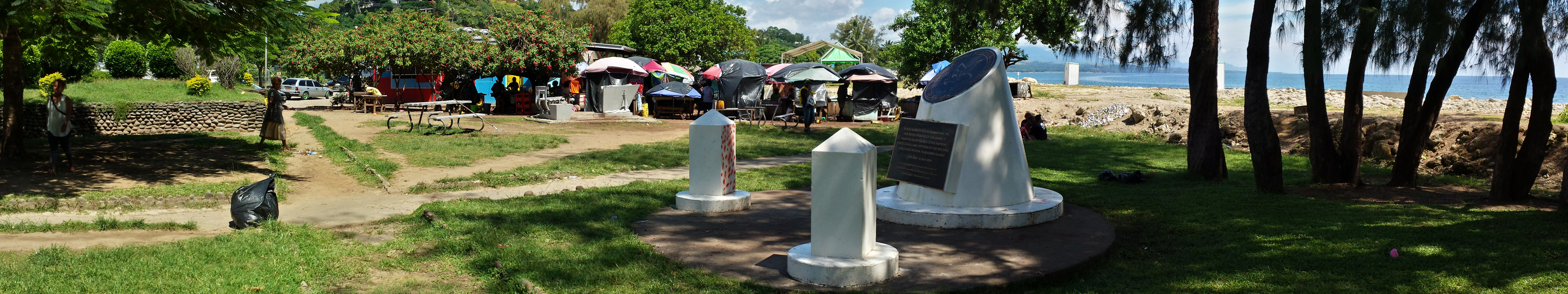
Police Memorial Park, Rove Honiara

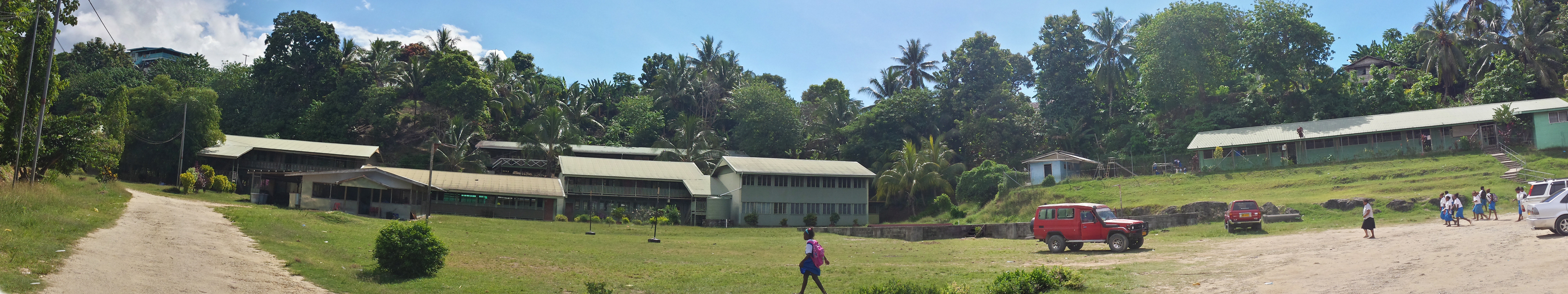
Bishop Epalle School

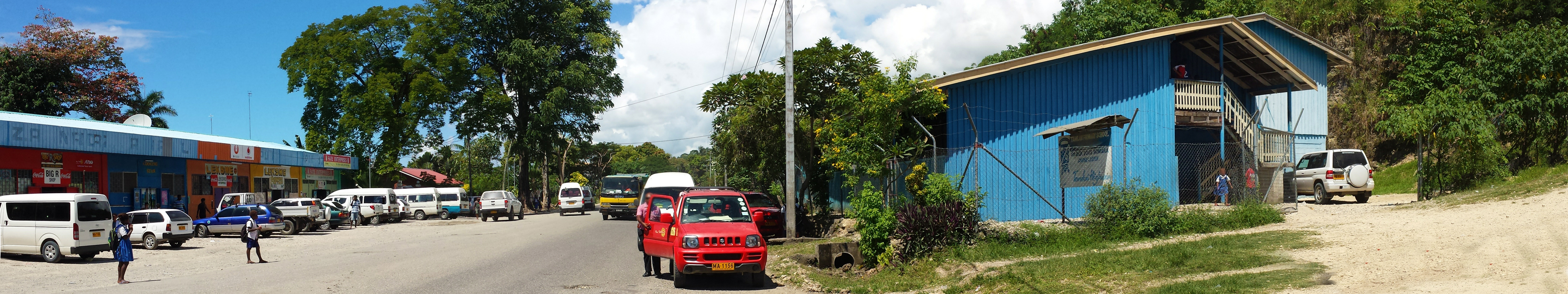
Panoramic photo of Tamlan School

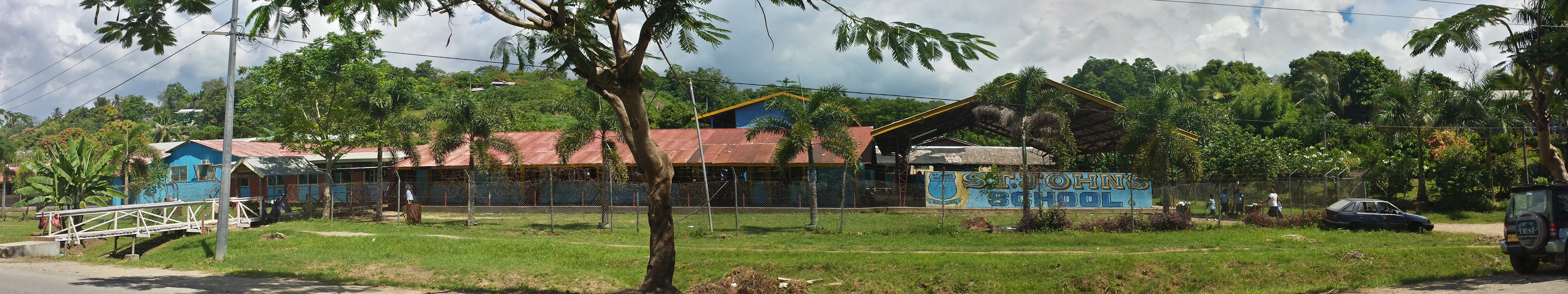
Panoramic photo of St. John School
