= Maneto Kuradal =

Nominated Member of the Legislative Council
- In office 1961–1964

Personal details
- Died: 5 June 1967; Kundiawa, Papua and New Guinea

Maneto Kuradal, also known as Maneto Tokuradal (died 5 June 1967), was a Papua New Guinean politician and trade unionist. He served as a member of the Legislative Council between 1961 and 1964.

== Biography ==
Originally from Reimber in East New Britain, Kuradal was educated in a Catholic mission. He moved to Madang in 1957. In 1960 he became the first secretary of the Madang branch of the Papua and New Guinea Workers' Association.

Kuradal was appointed to the Legislative Council as a representative of Madang by Administrator Donald Cleland following the 1961 elections. He did not contest the 1964 elections. Kuradal served as president of the Madang Workers' Association between 1963 and 1965. He worked as a local government assistant for the Department of District Administration.

He died in a road accident on the Highlands Highway near Kundiawa in June 1967.
