= Paul Mason (coastwatcher) =

Australian politician (1901–1972)

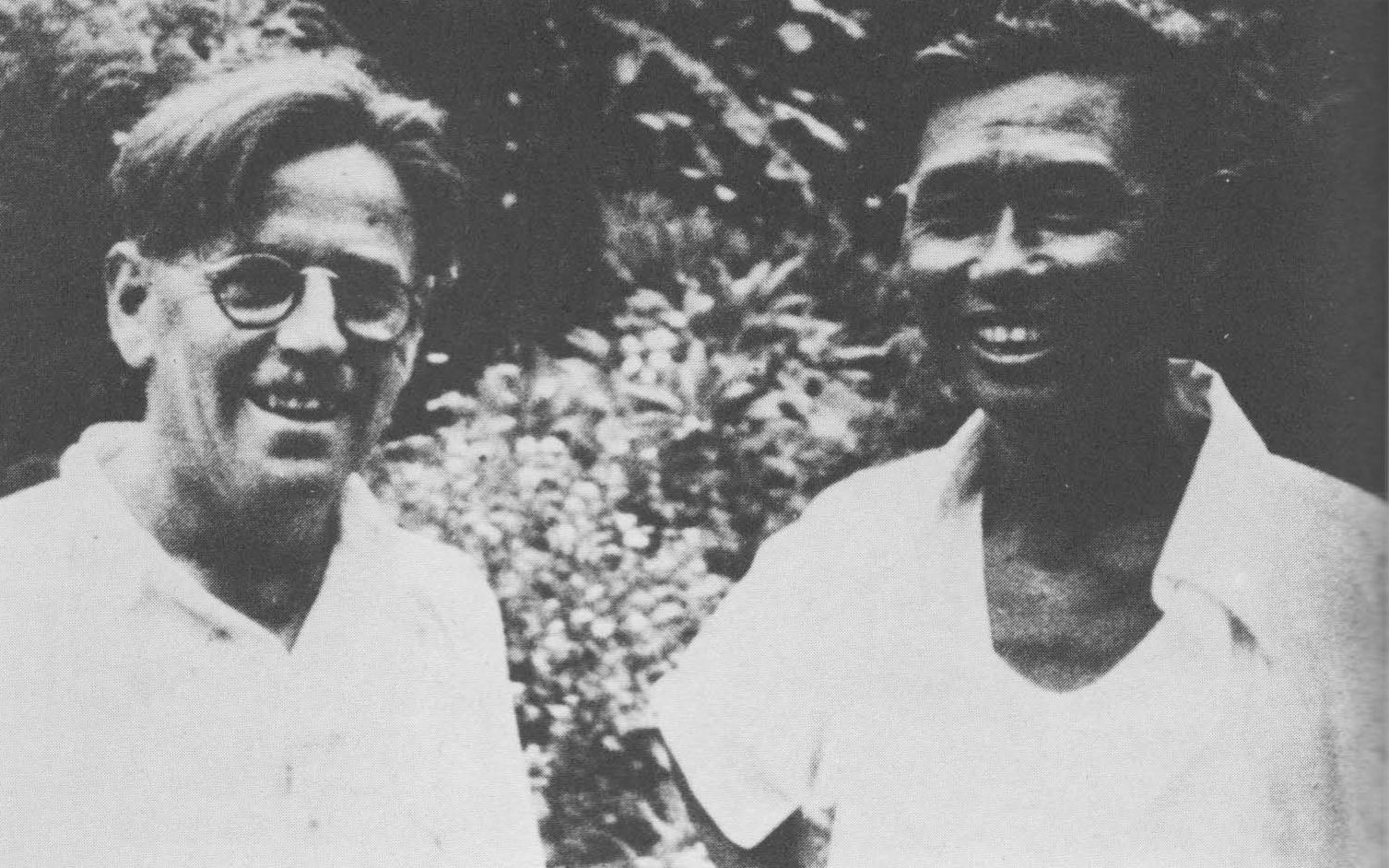
- Mason (left) with Wang You

Member of the Legislative Council
- In office 1961–1964
- Constituency: New Guinea Islands (European)

Personal details
- Born: 30 April 1901 Sydney, Australia
- Died: 31 December 1972 (aged 71) Brisbane, Australia

Paul Edward Allen Mason (30 April 1901 – 31 December 1972) was an Australian planter who spent most of his life in the Territory of Papua and New Guinea. During World War II he became a coastwatcher, playing a significant role in the Allied fightback in the Pacific Theatre by providing intelligence on Japanese operations around Bougainville. He later served as a member of the Legislative Council in the early 1960s.

== Biography ==
Mason was born in North Sydney in 1901 to Frederick Mason and Margaret Robinson; his father was a Danish-born master mariner who changed his surname from Mikkelsen. He attended Fort Street High School, but moved overseas in January 1916 at the age of 14 to work with his half-brother Tommy, becoming a plantation and trade store manager in the Shortland Islands when he was only 15. He returned to Australia in 1919, purchasing an orchard in Penrith. In 1923 he went back to the Shortland Islands to work for Associated Plantations. He subsequently transferred to Inus Plantations in Bougainville in 1925, taking over a plantation whose previous manager had been hacked to death by employees. He also briefly owned his own trading boat named Neui.

During World War II Mason was one of the few Australians to remain in the territory during the Japanese invasion of 1942, becoming part of Eric Feldt's coastwatchers team. To prevent him being harmed if captured by the Japanese, he was made a petty officer in the Royal Australian Naval Volunteer Reserve. Setting up observation camps at Kieta and later Buin, he provided vital assistance on the first day of the Guadalcanal campaign in August 1942, informing the allies that Japanese bombers were heading towards their forces, with the Americans subsequently destroying all but one of the Japanese planes. He was promoted to sub-lieutenant in November, and was awarded the American Distinguished Service Cross.

Once the Japanese realised where the information was coming from, a unit was sent to stop the Europeans on Bougainville. Mason and others fled northwards through the jungle to avoid capture, travelling shoeless, wearing just shorts and a singlet and carrying only a small rucksack and pistol. After meeting up with fellow coastwatcher Jack Read, he was asked to set up another watching station in the south of the island. Following an ambush in June 1943, he was forced to flee through the Keriaka plateau before being evacuated in July.

Although Mason returned to Bougainville in November 1943, he was forced back to Australia the following March due to contracting pneumonia during an unsuccessful mission to Treasury Island, after which the Japanese began spreading rumours they had killed him. He returned to Bougainville again in November 1944, this time organising a guerrilla force that killed nearly 2,300 Japanese soldiers. He was subsequently also awarded the British Distinguished Service Cross and promoted to lieutenant commander in the Naval Reserve (Special Branch) in December 1951. The Catalina pilots that kept him supplied while he was underground described him as representing "the upper limit of continuous bravery" and stated he was "their No 1 hero of World War II".

Following the war, Mason returned to Inus Plantations, where he was rewarded for his wartime efforts with shares. He married Noelle Taylor in November 1947 and the couple went on to open Buka Store and Chimbu Lodge. Now a celebrity figure, he also began writing for Pacific Islands Monthly. In the 1961 elections Mason contested the European New Guinea Islands seat, defeating the United Progress Party candidate W. Meehan to become a member of the Legislative Council. He did not run for re-election in 1964.

In late 1971 Mason was admitted to hospital in Bougainville. He was transferred to a hospital in Brisbane, but died in December. He was survived by his wife and two children.
