= Ken Wickham =

American author (born 1969)

Ken Wickham (born William Kenneth Wickham; July 10, 1969) is an American author of instructional non-fiction books and articles. His writings are focused on "how-to" type books within the automotive hobby.

== Early career ==
Before authoring his first book, Wickham began his apprenticeship in 1990 at an automotive shop in Austin, Texas. This shop, owned and operated by Mike Domoracki, specialized in competitive frame off restorations of 55-58 Chevrolets. This apprenticeship lasted approximately four years. Wickham commented that this training was crucial to both his writings and business. At national Chevy event, dozens of 1957s entered into competition. The question came; how to differentiate winners from losers? Wickham said, it often came down to how much detail and accuracy went into the restoration. He learned at the Stainless Shoppe that every nut and bolt is important and had to be accurately accounted for in order to win. In 1994, Wickham left this shop to form an automotive restoration business of his own. In the same year, he restored a 1954 Pontiac convertible to show standards and used it to promote his business. It was during this year, where he joined the Pontiac Oakland Club International and became the club's restoration advisor. As restoration advisor, Wickham published a series of articles in the club's publication Smoke Signals. The first set of articles were focused on his own restoration project, but the articles gradually drifted into an "ask and answer" format that resembled the Dear Abby columns that originated in the 1950s. During these years, members of the club would mail in questions with photographs and Wickham published the answers in upcoming issues of the magazine. These articles also inspired related columns, not authored by Wickham, where members shared their restoration methods and ideas. The articles ran from 1994 to 1996, and terminated for unknown reasons. Wickham later recalled that these articles inspired his first book.

== Professional writing career ==
In 1998, Krause Publications of Iola, Wisconsin, published Wickham's first book, Modern Techniques for Auto Restoration. The book focuses on how to find good classic cars and perform tasks from the basics all the way up to frame-off restorations. The author received criticism by some for using the book to attack environmentalism or environmental laws. The author explains in the foreword of the book that criticisms of environmental laws were in response to the concerns of his readers and questions he received at national car shows. Other reviews of the book were complimentary.

In 2002, Krause Publications was purchased by F+W Media, but books were still published under the Krause Publications (KP) name. Same year, Krause offered Wickham's second book, Standard Guide to Building Street Rods and Custom Cars. The book fits into the publisher's set of "Standard Guide" book themes by various authors and ranging in a wide variety of subjects. The book is longer and more detailed than his first book and covers a similar automotive theme intended to help readers with building hot rods and custom cars. In general, the book appeared to be well received by readers and the reviews were positive.

In 2004, Wickham completed restoration of a 1957 Mercedes-Benz 300SL Gullwing. This car has been verified by the Mercedes-Benz Club of America as being the last 300SL coupe ever manufactured. In this same year, the Pebble Beach Concours d'Elegance car show accepted 300SLs into the show for the first time. Before 2004, gullwings were not allowed entry, but the show changed that ruling in 2004 to celebrate the gullwing's 50th anniversary. Wickham's '57 scored third place.

In 2005, KP published Ken Wickham's third book, Building Street Rods, All You Need to Know. Although the subject matter appears to be similar to his second book, the third book clearly departs in format. This book is entirely in color (the other two are black and white) with a broader spectrum of photographs supporting the material. There are not enough book reviews to gauge how it was received by the automotive community.

== Post writing career ==
No other books are known to exist from this author after 2005. According to the publisher, he is alive and living in Texas.
