= Harry Wickham =

Solomon Islander swimmer

Personal information
- Born: 10 September 1882 Solomon Islands
- Died: 15 April 1962 (aged 79) Solomon Islands
- Education: Newington College

Sport
- Sport: Swimming

Harry Wickham (10 September 1882 – 14 October 1962) was a Solomon Islander swimmer who with his half-brother Alick Wickham is acknowledged as being an early exponent of the crawl swimming stroke in Australia before its introduction to competitive swimming.

== Biography ==
Wickham was born on the island of Hobopeka in the New Georgia region of the Solomon Islands. He was the son of Frank Wickham, an English plantation owner, and Ameriga a Melanesian woman from Buin, Papua New Guinea. He was jointly raised by his parents and the local ceremonial and war leader Chief Hingava. His only known formal European style education was at Newington College in Sydney from 1899 until 1900. A few years later Wickham was joined in Sydney by his younger half-brother Alick Wickham who gained attention with his swimming stroke in an under-10s race at Bronte Beach. Following Wickham’s return to the Solomons, he managed a copra plantation at Hobopeka in the Roviana Lagoon, and worked as an accountant for Burns Philp. He served as a lieutenant during the Japanese occupation of The Solomons during World War II. He married six times and fathered several children. He died in the Solomons and is buried there.
