= Coastwatchers =

1940s Pacific islands intelligence service

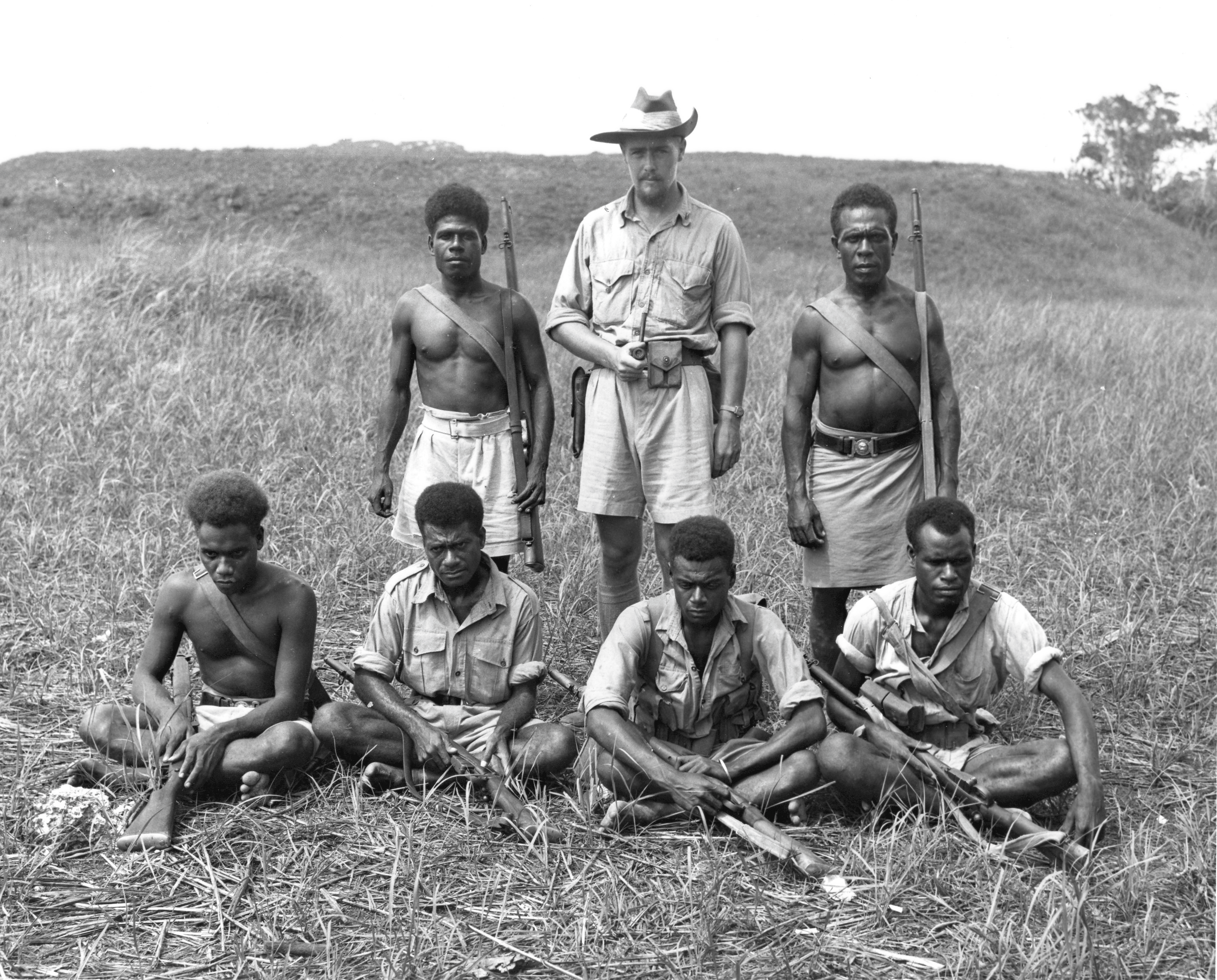
Captain Martin Clemens (rear centre), a coastwatcher on Guadalcanal, provided intelligence to Allied forces during the battle for the island (August 1942 – February 1943). The men with him were all members of the Solomon Islands police force.

The Coastwatchers, also known as the Coast Watch Organisation, Combined Field Intelligence Service, or Section C, Allied Intelligence Bureau, were Allied military intelligence operatives stationed on remote Pacific islands during World War II to observe enemy movements and rescue stranded Allied personnel. They played a significant role in the Pacific Ocean theatre and South West Pacific theatre, particularly as an early warning network during the Guadalcanal campaign.

== Overview ==
Captain Chapman James Clare, district naval officer of Western Australia, proposed a coastwatching programme in 1919. In 1922, the Australian Commonwealth Naval Board directed the Naval Intelligence Division of the Royal Australian Navy to organise a coastwatching service. In the 1920s and 1930s, Walter Brooksbank, a civil assistant to the Director of Naval Intelligence, worked to organise a skeleton service of plantation owners and managers whose properties were in strategic locations in northern Australia, the Australian controlled Territory of Papua and the British Solomon Islands.

In 1939, when war appeared imminent, he expanded the coast-watching service with additional island planters, traders, miners and missionaries. During the war the civilian coastwatchers were augmented with about 400 coastwatchers who were Australian military officers, New Zealand servicemen, Pacific Islanders, or escaped Allied prisoners of war.

Lieutenant Commander Eric Feldt, based in Townsville, Queensland, led the Australian coastwatching organisation during much of World War II. Coastwatchers became particularly important in monitoring Japanese activity in the roughly one thousand islands that make up the Solomon Islands. Commander Feldt resigned his command due to illness in March 1943. His role was taken over by James McManus of the Royal Australian Navy.

The Australian military commissioned many personnel who took part in coastwatcher operations behind enemy lines as officers of the Royal Australian Navy Volunteer Reserve (RANVR) to protect them in case of capture. The Imperial Japanese Army did not always recognise this status, and executed several such officers. Escaped Allied personnel and civilians augmented the coastwatchers' numbers. In one case, three German missionaries assisted the coastwatchers after escaping Japanese captivity, even though Nazi Germany had allied itself with the Empire of Japan during the war.

Feldt code-named his organisation "Ferdinand", taking the name from a popular children's book about a bull, The Story of Ferdinand. He said:

Ferdinand ... did not fight but sat under a tree and just smelled the flowers. It was meant as a reminder to coastwatchers that it was not their duty to fight and so draw attention to themselves, but to sit circumspectly and unobtrusively, gathering information. Of course, like their titular prototype, they could fight if they were stung.

In June 1942, "Ferdinand" became part of the Allied Intelligence Bureau, which came under the Allies' South West Pacific Area (command) (SWPA). Feldt reported both to GHQ, SWPA, in Brisbane and to the United States-Australian-British Fleet Radio Unit in Melbourne (FRUMEL), which came under the Pacific Ocean Areas command.

New Zealand developed its own coastwatching scheme in the 1930s. From the outbreak of war, the New Zealand Naval Board controlled coastwatching stations located around the New Zealand coastline and in the eastern Pacific. Stations were established in the Gilbert and Ellice Islands, Tokelau, Samoa, Fanning Island, the Cook Islands, Tonga, and Fiji.

== Significance ==
The coastwatchers saved Guadalcanal and Guadalcanal saved the South Pacific.
— U.S. Admiral William Halsey.

When the Japanese overran the Gilbert Islands in 1942, 17 New Zealand coastwatchers were captured. Imprisoned at Tarawa, they were executed by the Japanese in October 1942 following an American air raid.

In early November 1942, two coastwatchers named Jack Read and Paul Mason on Bougainville Island radioed early warnings to the United States Navy about Japanese warship and air movements (citing the numbers, type, and speed of enemy units) preparing to attack the US Forces in the Solomon Islands.

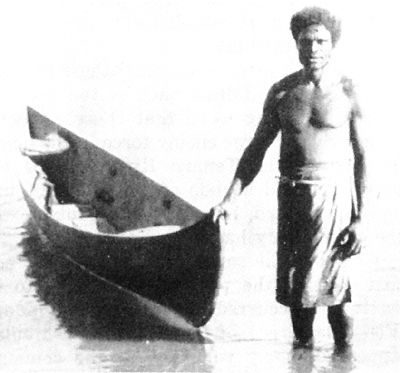
Sir Jacob Vouza in August 1942, soon after the Allied landings on Guadalcanal. Vouza escaped his Japanese captors and warned the Allies of the surprise Japanese attack at the Battle of the Tenaru.

K. H. McColl had to flee from Wuvulu Island when Japanese forces began searching the nearby island, and travelled with other coast watchers to the Sepik River. McColl and L. Pursehouse operated in 1942 and 1943 at an abandoned Lutheran mission at Sattelberg, New Guinea. The mission was situated atop a hill about 900 metres (3,000 ft) above sea level, approximately 8 kilometres (5.0 mi) inland from Finschhafen, and would later become a battle site from 17 and 25 November 1943 during the Battle of Sattelberg. McColl and Pursehouse were ambushed by Japanese forces, however they escaped. In December 1944 McColl was back in the Sepik River region.

One of the most highly decorated coastwatchers was Sergeant Major Sir Jacob C. Vouza, who retired from the local constabulary in 1941, volunteered for coastwatcher duty, and was captured and interrogated brutally. He survived and escaped to make contact with US Marines warning them of an impending Japanese attack. He recovered from his wounds and continued to scout for the Marines. He was awarded the Silver Star and Legion of Merit by the United States, and later received a knighthood as well as becoming a Member of the Order of the British Empire

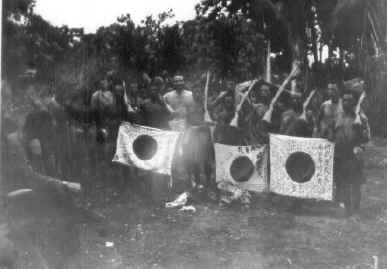
Solomon Islander scouts display Japanese weapons and flags captured during Carlson's patrol

In 1943, Lt. (j.g.) John F. Kennedy of the United States Navy—the future president—and 10 fellow crew members were shipwrecked after the sinking of their boat, the PT-109. An Australian coastwatcher, Sub-Lt Arthur Reginald Evans, observed the explosion of the PT-109 when it was rammed by a Japanese destroyer. Despite US Navy crews giving up the downed crew as a complete loss, Evans dispatched Solomon Islander scouts Biuku Gasa and Eroni Kumana in a dugout canoe to search for survivors. The two scouts found the men after searching for five days.

Lacking paper, Kennedy scratched a message on a coconut describing the plight and position of his crew. Gasa and Kumana then paddled 38 miles (61 km) through Japanese-held waters, at great personal risk, to deliver the message to Evans, who radioed the news to Kennedy's squadron commander. The future US president was rescued shortly afterward, and 20 years later welcomed Evans to the White House. Gasa did not make the trip, later claiming he received the invitation to attend but was fooled into not attending by British colonial officials. Gasa left his village and arrived in Honiara, but was not allowed to leave in time for the ceremony.

"After the rescue Kennedy said he would meet us again," Kumana says in The Search for Kennedy's PT-109. "When he became President, he invited us to visit him. But when we got to the airport, we were met by a clerk, who said we couldn't go—Biuku and I spoke no English. My feelings went for bad."

In July 2022, coastwatchers James Burrowes and Ronald George Lee were honoured in a wreath-laying ceremony by U.S. Ambassador to Australia Caroline Kennedy (the daughter of President Kennedy) and General Mark Milley, Chairman of the U.S. Joint Chiefs of Staff. Both men died within days of each other in 2024.

== In popular culture ==
There was an increase of interest in coastwatchers following the election of Kennedy to President in 1960. Coastwatcher characters appeared in films such as The Wackiest Ship in the Army and TV productions such as The Coastwatchers.

The 1964 film, Father Goose, starred Cary Grant as Walter Eckland, who is reluctantly persuaded to become a coastwatcher for the Allies on a fictional Pacific island.

== See also ==
- Home Guard (United Kingdom)
- Auxiliary Units
- Volunteer Defence Corps (Australia)
- Home Guard (New Zealand)
- Pacific Coast Militia Rangers
- Veterans Guard of Canada

== Sources ==
- Butcher, Mike (2012). ... when the long trick's over: Donald Kennedy in the Pacific. Kennington, Vic., Australia: Holland House. ISBN 9780987162700.
- Clemens, Martin (2004). Alone on Guadalcanal: A Coastwatcher's Story (reissue ed.). Bluejacket Books. ISBN 1-59114-124-9.
- Feldt, Eric Augustus (1991) [1946]. The Coastwatchers. Victoria, Australia: Penguin Books. ISBN 0-14-014926-0.
- Feuer, A. B. (1992). Coastwatching in World War II. Stackpole Military History Series. Westport, Connecticut, USA: Stackpole Books. ISBN 0-8117-3329-7.
- Horton, D. C. (1970). Fire Over the Islands. ISBN 0-589-07089-4.
- Lord, Walter (2006) [1977]. Lonely Vigil; Coastwatchers of the Solomons. New York: Naval Institute Press. ISBN 1-59114-466-3.
- Macdougal, A. (2002). Australians at War: A Pictorial History. The Five Mile Press. ISBN 1-86503-865-2.
- Rhoades, F. A. (1982). A Diary of a Coastwatcher in the Solomons. Fredericksburg, Texas, USA: Admiral Nimitz Foundation.
