= Jacob C. Vouza =

Solomon Islander military officer

Sir Jacob Charles Vouza, KBE, GM, QPM
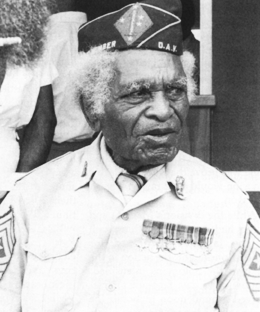
- Born: c. 1892; Tasimboko, Guadalcanal, British Solomon Islands
- Died: 15 March 1984 (aged 91–92); Honiara, Guadalcanal, Solomon Islands
- Military career
- Allegiance: Solomon Islands
- Branch: Solomon Islands Protectorate Armed Constabulary (1916–1941); Coastwatchers (1942–1945)
- Service years: 1916–1941; 1942–c.1945
- Rank: Sergeant Major (Constabulary)
- Units: 2nd Raider Battalion, USMC
- Conflicts: World War II: Guadalcanal campaign
- Awards: Knight Commander of the Order of the British Empire; George Medal; Silver Star (United States); Legion of Merit (United States)
- Other work: British Solomon Islands Protectorate Advisory Council

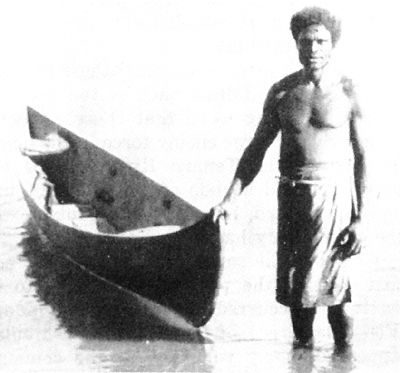
Vouza on Guadalcanal in August 1942, soon after the Allied landings.

Sir Jacob Charles Vouza, KBE, GM, QPM (c. 1892 – 15 March 1984) was a native police officer of the British Solomon Islands Protectorate, who served with the United States Marine Corps in the Guadalcanal campaign during World War II.

== Early life ==
Vouza was born in Tasimboko, Guadalcanal, British Solomon Islands, and educated at the South Seas Evangelical Mission School there. In 1916, he joined the Solomon Islands Protectorate Armed Constabulary. He retired in 1941, after 25 years of service, at the rank of sergeant major.

== World War II service ==
In mid-1942, Japanese forces invaded Guadalcanal. Vouza returned to active duty with the British forces and volunteered to work with the Coastwatchers. Major Martin Clemens, a former British Solomon Islands Protectorate district officer, was the officer in charge of Sergeant Major Vouza's brigade of native scouts. Vouza's ability as a scout had already been established when the US 1st Marine Division landed on Guadalcanal on 7 August 1942. That same day, Vouza rescued an aviator from USS Wasp who was shot down in Japanese-held territory. He guided the pilot to American lines, where he met the Marines for the first time.

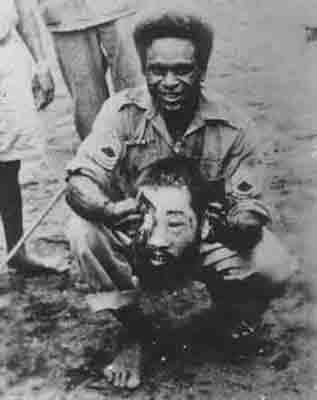
Jacob Vouza holding the severed head of a Japanese soldier in Guadalcanal, December 1942.

Vouza then volunteered to scout behind enemy lines. On 20 August, while scouting for suspected Japanese outposts, Vouza was captured by men of the Ichiki Detachment, a battalion-strength force of the Japanese 28th Infantry Regiment. Having found a small American flag in Vouza's loincloth, the Japanese tied him to a tree and tortured him for information about Allied forces. Vouza was questioned for hours, but refused to talk. He was then bayoneted in both of his arms, throat, shoulder, face, and stomach, and left to die.

After his captors departed, he freed himself by chewing through the ropes with his teeth, and made his way through the miles of jungle to American lines. Before receiving medical attention, he gasped a warning to Martin Clemens and Lieutenant Colonel Edwin A. Pollock, whose 2nd Battalion 1st Marines held the defences at the Ilu River mouth. Vouza told him that an estimated 250 to 500 Japanese soldiers were coming to attack his position in any minute. This warning gave the Marines the brief but precious time of about ten minutes to prepare their defences along the Ilu river. The subsequent Battle of the Tenaru was a clear victory for the Marines.

After spending twelve days in the hospital, Vouza returned to duty as the chief scout for the Marines. He accompanied Lieutenant Colonel Evans F. Carlson and the 2nd Raider Battalion on their 30-day raid behind enemy lines.

== Awards ==
Vouza was highly decorated for his World War II service. The Silver Star was presented to him personally by Major General Alexander A. Vandegrift, commanding general of the 1st Marine Division, for refusing to give information under Japanese torture. In 1945, he also was awarded the Legion of Merit for outstanding service with the 2nd Raider Battalion during November and December 1942, and was made an honorary sergeant major in the Marine Corps. From the British government, Vouza received the George Medal (GM) for gallant conduct and exceptional devotion to duty, and the Police Long Service and Good Conduct Medal. In the 1957 New Year Honours, he furthermore was appointed a Member of the Order of the British Empire (MBE) for public services in the British Solomon Islands Protectorate. In the 1979 Birthday Honours, he was promoted to a Knight Commander of the Order of the British Empire (KBE) for outstanding services to his country and local community, and thereby granted the title sir.

== After the war ==
After the war, Vouza continued to serve his fellow islanders. He was appointed district headman in 1949, and was president of the Guadalcanal Council from 1952 to 1958. He was a member of the British Solomon Islands Protectorate Advisory Council from 1950 to 1960.

He made many friends during his association with the Marine Corps, and Marines frequently visited him on Guadalcanal. In 1968, Vouza visited the United States as the honoured guest of the 1st Marine Division Association. He wore his Marine Corps tunic until his death on 15 March 1984, and was buried in it.

=== Memorial ===
A monument in his honour stands in front of the police headquarters building in Honiara, the capital of the Solomon Islands.

Photos of plaques on the Honiara Monument
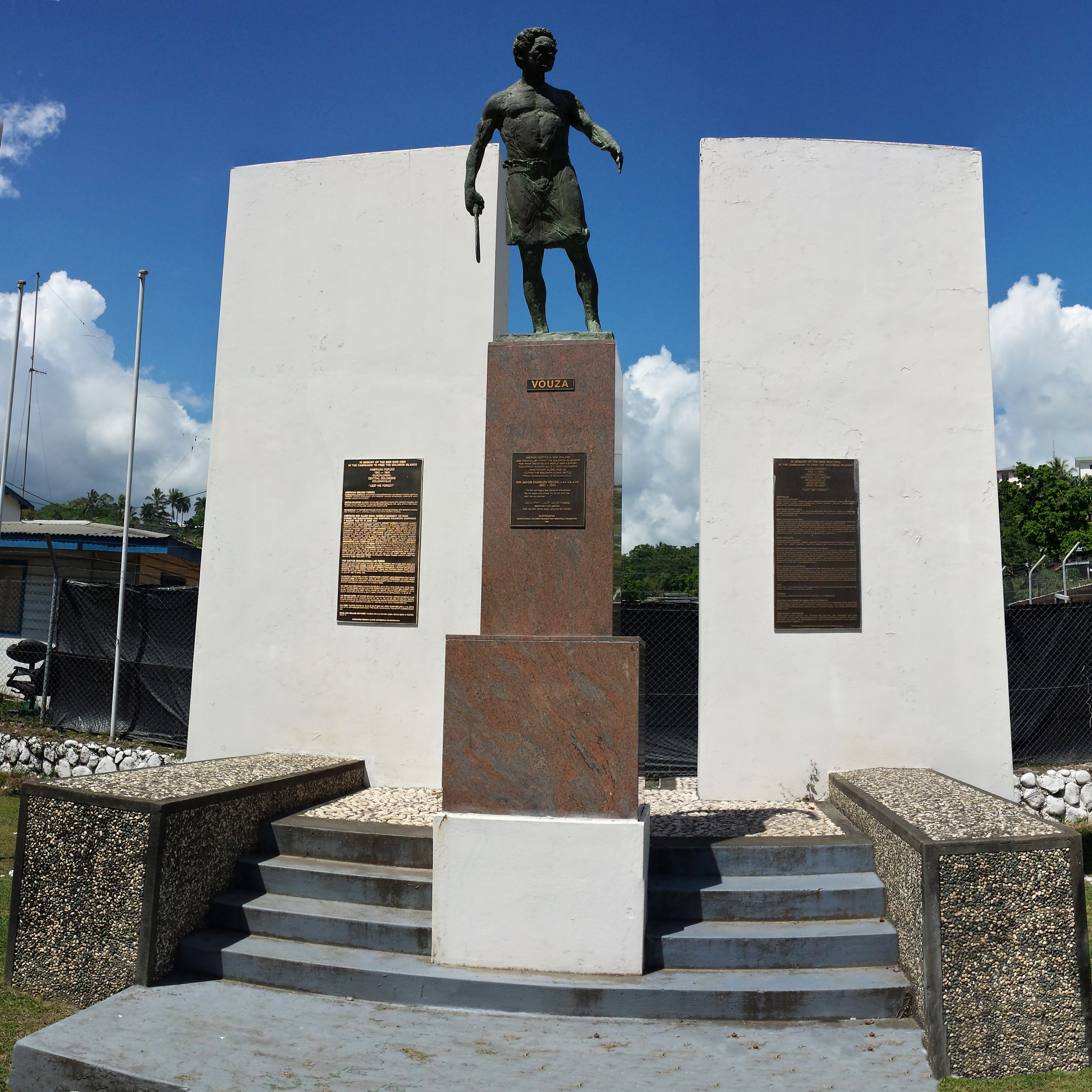
Sir Jacob Vouza memorial at Honiara, Solomon Islands.

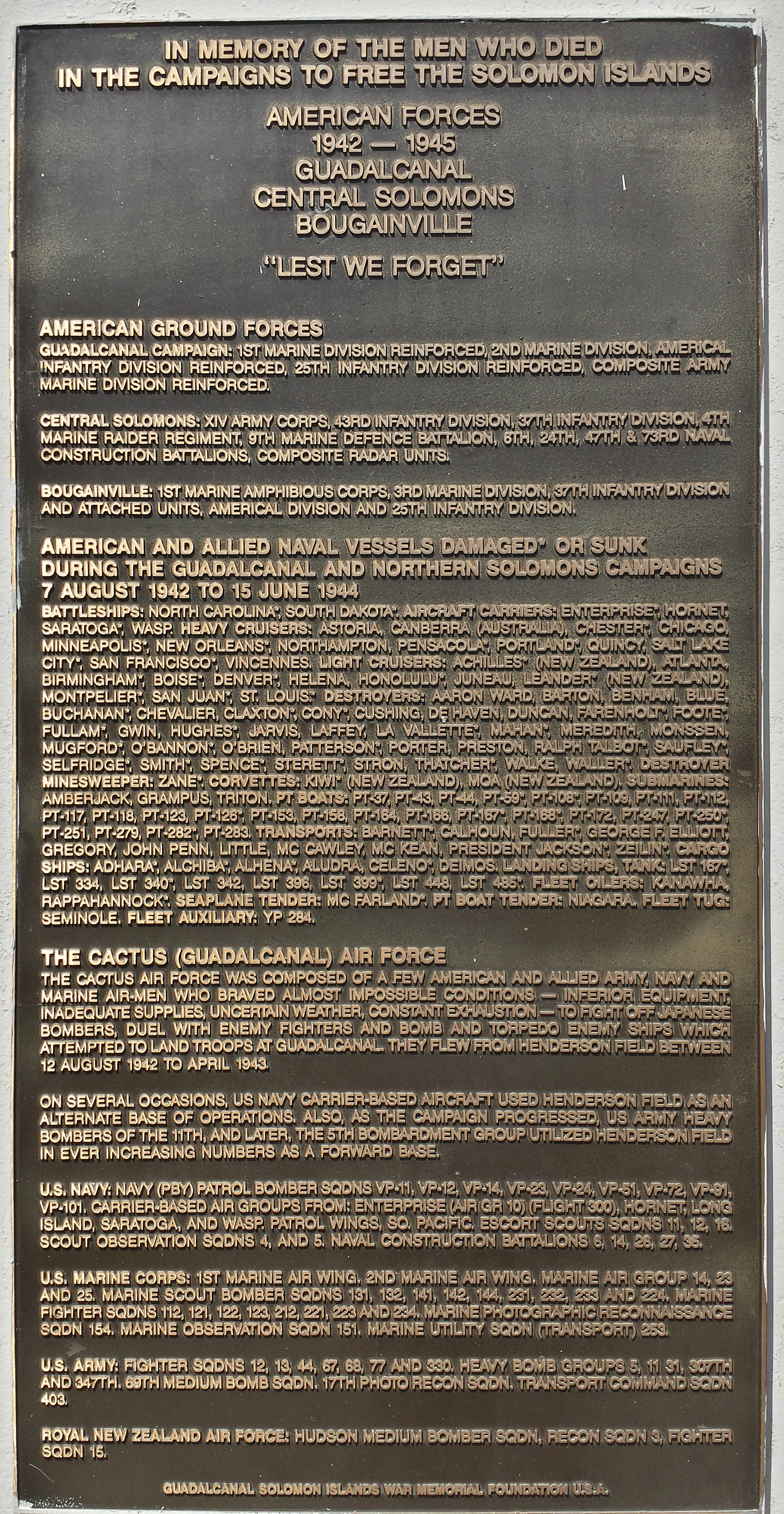
Plaque on the Sir Jacob Vouza memorial at Rove, Honiara Solomon Islands – Battle of Guadalcanal

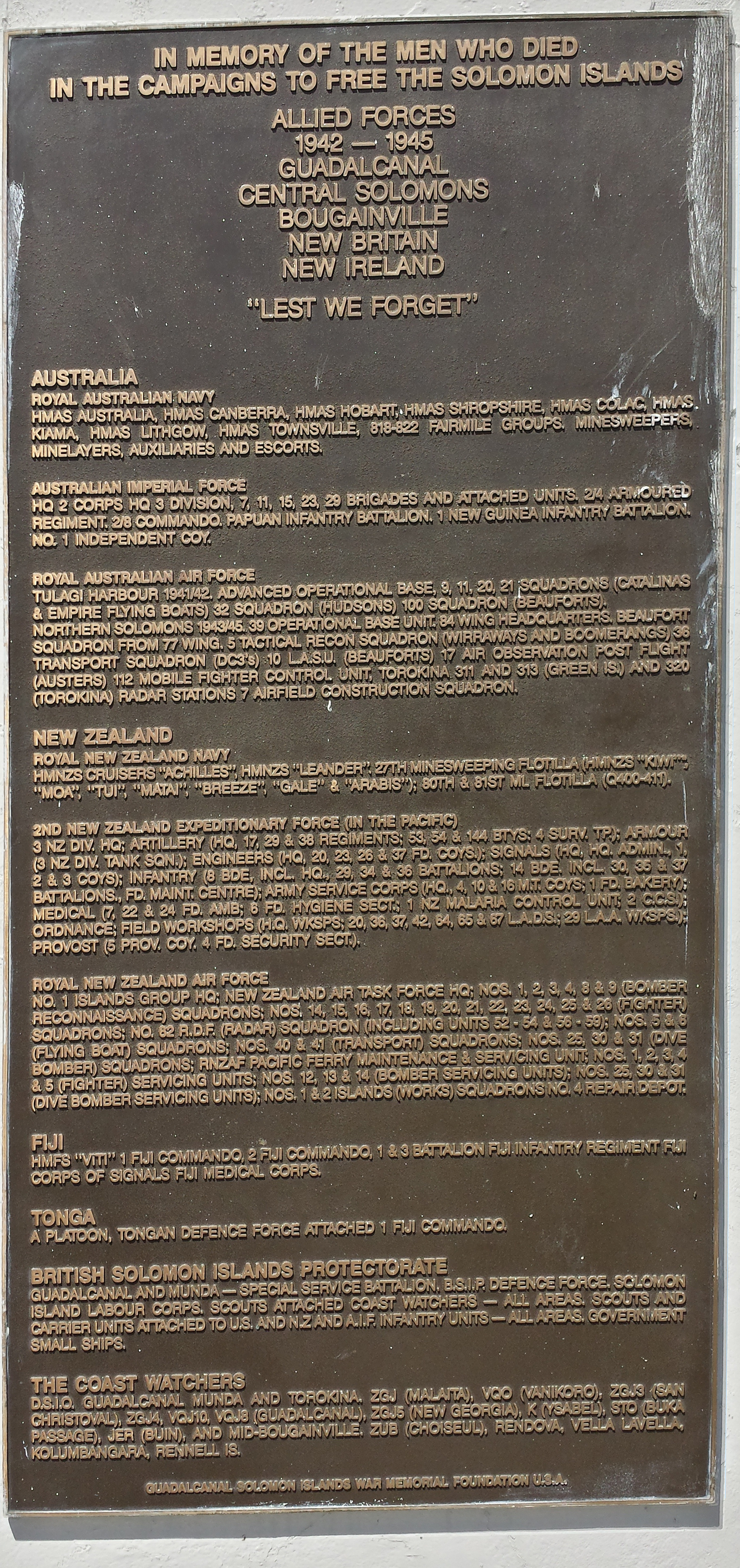
Second plaque on the Sir Jacob Vouza memorial at Rove, Honiara Solomon Islands – Battle of Guadalcanal

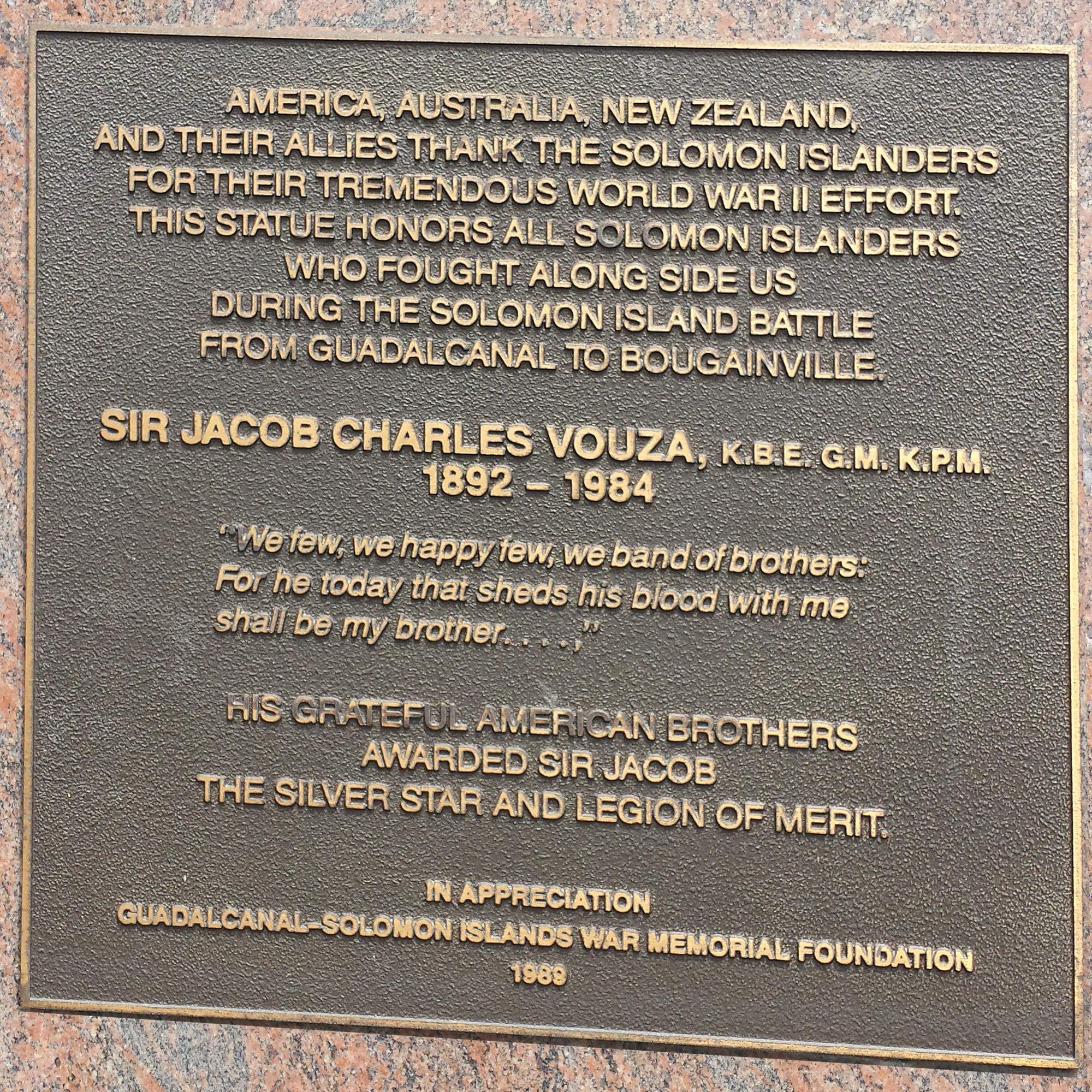
Plaque on the Sir Jacob Vouza memorial at Rove, Honiara Solomon Islands – 1989

== See also ==
- Coastwatchers
- Paul Mason (coastwatcher)
- William John Read
