= William Wickham (cricketer) =

English cricketer

Personal information
- Full name: William Fiennes Wickham
- Born: 4 October 1825; Winchester, Hampshire, England
- Died: 14 January 1845 (aged 19); Winchester, Hampshire, England
- Batting: Unknown

Domestic team information
- Years: Team
- 1844: Oxford University

Career statistics
Competition	First-class
Matches	1
Runs scored	1
Batting average	1.00
100s/50s	–/–
Top score	1*
Catches/stumpings	–/–
- Source: Cricinfo, 7 March 2020

William Fiennes Wickham (4 October 1825 – 14 January 1845) was an English first-class cricketer.

The son of William John Wickham and Lucy Trotman, he was born at Winchester in October 1825. He was educated at Winchester College, before going up to Wadham College, Oxford. While studying at Oxford, he made a single appearance in first-class cricket for Oxford University against the Marylebone Cricket Club at Oxford in 1844. Batting twice in the match, he was dismissed in the Oxford first-innings without scoring by William Hillyer, while in their second-innings he was unbeaten on a single run. Wickham died at Winchester in January 1845, following a fall from his horse.
