= Alick Wickham =

Solomon Islander swimmer and diver (1886–1967)

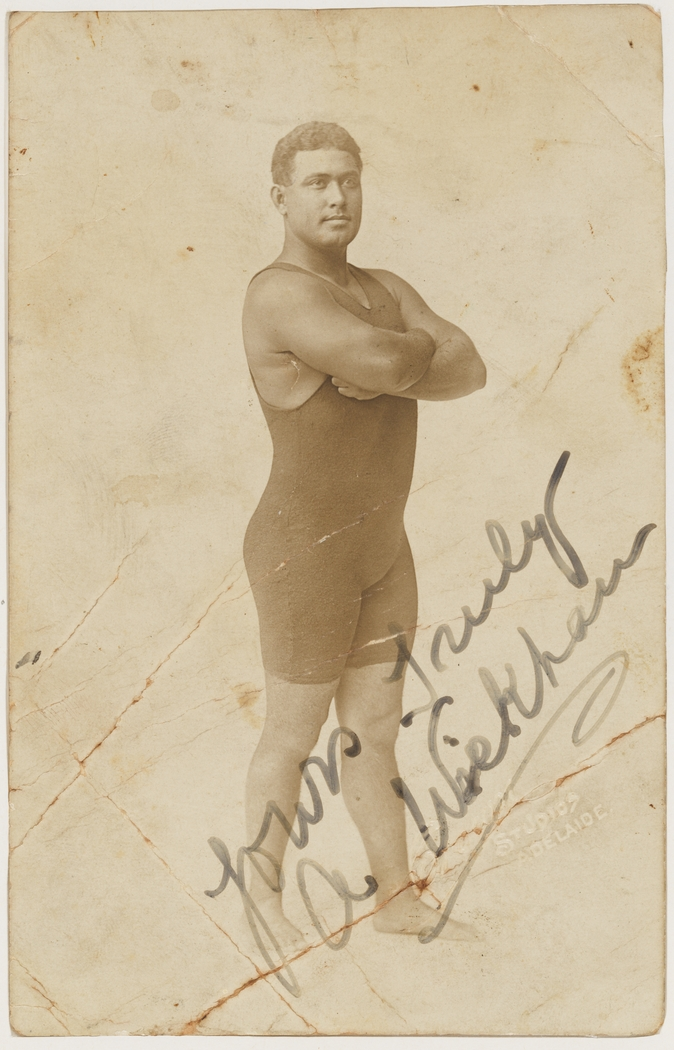
- Signed photograph

Personal information
- Born: Alick F. Wickham; 1 June 1886 Gizo, New Georgia, Roviana Lagoon, Solomon Islands
- Died: 10 August 1967 (aged 81) (Note: The date of his death is either 10 or 11 August 1967.) National Referral Hospital, Honiara, Solomon Islands
- Occupation(s): Swimmer, diver
- Weight: 12 st (168 lb; 76 kg)

Alick F. Wickham (1 June 1886 – 10 August 1967) was a Solomon Islander swimmer and diver. Wickham resided in Sydney from 1901 to 1927 where he achieved several Australian and New South Wales titles for swimming. Yet perhaps Wickham's most significant achievement is his 62-meter (205 feet, nine inches) swan dive into the Yarra River, Melbourne in 1918 in which he was credited with breaking a world diving record and attracted more than 70,000 spectators from all across Melbourne. Wickham is also widely known for being a pioneer of the modern front crawl.

== Early life ==
Wickham was born on 1 June 1886 in Gizo, New Georgia, one of the Solomon Islands. He was the son of Francis "Frank" Wickham and Pinge Naru. His father was born in Somerset, England, and arrived in the Solomons around 1875, becoming "a prosperous and influential trader and planter who owned several sailing vessels and significant tracts of land in Roviana and Marovo lagoons". He married three times and had six children in total. His half-brother was Harry Wickham.

At the age of seven, Wickham moved from the Solomon Islands to Sydney in his father's schooner. In Sydney, as a schoolboy, Wickham would work as a house boy and in his free time would swim at the sea baths in Bronte Beach where he was often observed by prominent members of the Australian sporting scene including notable Australian coach of the time, George Farmer. Farmer would observe speedy Wickham and shout, "look at that kid crawling!" From this comment the stroke label, the Australian crawl, was coined then later developed by other swimmers. Sydneysider, Arthur Freeman would watch Wickham too and claimed that, "Wickham's six-beat kick reminded me [Freeman] of an outboard motor".

== Sporting achievements ==
As an aquatic sportsman and pioneer, Wickham was the inaugural Australasian dive champion in 1904 and from 1908 to 1912 was the New South Wales state champion for both diving and swimming. Wickham is also credited as having a role to play in the development of body surfing. Wickham often performed at swimming carnivals and events where he showcased his wild stunts. He also achieved the unofficial world record for fifty-yards freestyle in 1910. Indeed, he was the inventor of the Australian crawl, later known as freestyle(11).

=== Record dive ===
In April 1918, Wickham took what was purported to be a record-breaking 62-meter swan dive into the Yarra River at Deep Rock Swimming Club. Up to 70,000 inner-city residents came to watch in awe at Wickham's eventful dive. In the early 20th century, the much cleaner Yarra River was a popular place to swim for Melburnians and saw a peak in popularity in the 1920s. Wickham's dive was partially organised by notorious businessman, John Wren to raise funds for Australian soldiers. An article titled "Alick Wickham's Sensational Dive" by W.F. Corbett published by Sydney-based newspaper The Referee on Wednesday 17 April 1918 describes Wickham's momentous 62 meter high dive. In an interview included in the article following the dive Wickham says, "I [Wickham] could not say how I reached the water or how I struck it. But I do know that I was sore and bleeding in places from the chest to the waist. My costume was torn from neck to knee. Must have hit the surface with my body you think. So do I".

== Personal life ==
At the time Wickham was known as quite an 'exotic' identity and was often billed as a foreign prince, Prince Wickyama. Wickham and Dorothy Bellisario Fraser were married on 25 July 1917 in Sydney. The couple gave birth to a daughter named Joyce (c. 1918–1996). Too old for competitive swimming, Wickham drove taxis to make ends meet and took part in a variety of other jobs. After the death of his father in the late 1920s, Wickham permanently returned to the Solomon Islands and led a life of obscurity. He then remarried three times and had at least two children. Wickham remarried to Ima Tako (c. 1880s–1969) on the island of Munda with whom he had two sons, Rex Pae (d. 2002) and Alick Gena (Kena) Wickham (d. 2001). With the exception of working as a scout in World War II, Wickham spent the last years of his life in Munda. He died in hospital in the nation's capital, Honiara of natural causes on 10 or 11 August 1967 and was buried in the Old Colonial Graveyard in Honiara.

== Legacy ==
Wickham is recognised in the International Swimming Hall of Fame in the United States and the Australian Sporting Hall of Fame for being one of the first to introduce the freestyle stroke to Australia and is featured in documentaries on television, the radio, movies and in many books and articles. While in the Solomon Islands, he is honoured in many sites including a swimming pool in Honiara carrying his namesake since 1973. He also featured in commemorative postal stamp booklets in the Solomon Islands in 1984. The site of Wickham's most recognized dive is located by the Yarra River in Yarra Bend Park, Fairfield and is marked with a placard. This site is also the former Deep Rock Swimming Club.

== See also ==
- List of members of the International Swimming Hall of Fame
