= Eric Feldt =

Royal Australian Navy officer

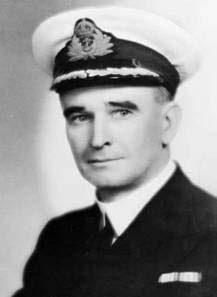
- Commander Eric Feldt c.1940s
- Born: 3 January 1899; Ingham, Queensland
- Died: 12 March 1968 (aged 69); New Farm, Queensland
- Military career
- Allegiance: Australia
- Branch: Royal Australian Navy
- Service years: 1913–1922; 1939–1945
- Rank: Commander
- Commands: Coastwatchers
- Conflicts: First World War; Second World War; New Guinea campaign; Guadalcanal campaign; Solomon Islands campaign
- Awards: Officer of the Order of the British Empire

Commander Eric Augustas Feldt OBE, RAN (3 January 1899 – 12 March 1968) was an officer in the Royal Australian Navy and the director of the Coastwatchers organisation for much of the Second World War.

== Early life ==
Feldt was born in Ingham, North Queensland, on 3 January 1899, the eighth child of Swedish immigrants, Peter Nilsson Feldt, a cane farmer, and Augusta Blixt. Feldt attended the local school before winning a scholarship to Brisbane Grammar School where he boarded for a year. He then won selection for the first intake of cadets into the Royal Naval College in 1913, being the only cadet from Queensland.

He graduated as a midshipman in 1917 and sailed to England in April 1917 where he initially served on HMS Canada. He was promoted to lieutenant in February in 1920. In 1922 he left the Navy and was placed on the retired list.

In February 1923, Feldt became a clerk in the public service of the mandated Territory of New Guinea. He rose to a patrol officer and then to district officer. In Brisbane, on 10 January 1933, he married Nancy Lynette Echlin. They had no children.

Feldt suffered a near-fatal bout of scrub typhus in 1935. Although he recovered, he felt he never regained his pre-illness level of robust health. On recovery he took up the position of Warden of Wau goldfields.

== World War II ==
In April 1939, aware of the stirrings in Europe, Feldt transferred back to the Navy's emergency list. When war came in September 1939, the Director of Naval Intelligence, Commander Rupert Long, a 1913 naval classmate, offered Feldt the task of heading a new Naval Intelligence Centre in Port Moresby. From there Feldt could vastly extend the existing, but small, Coastwatcher service in Papua New Guinea and the Solomon Islands.

Feldt accepted the position. In that same month Feldt set out to travel in New Guinea, Papua and the Solomons to personally enlist the help of every man who had a teleradio. "My travels took me all around the area by ship, motor boat, canoe, foot, bicycle and aeroplane, so I saw nearly everybody and nearly everybody saw me…… and nearly all were helpful." At this stage all Feldt's appointments were unpaid civilian volunteers. A teleradio consisted of a transmitter, a receiver and a loud speaker, which were transported in three metal boxes measuring 60 cm x 30 cm x 30 cm. They were powered by car batteries, which were charged by a petrol engine weighing 30 kg. Moving them was difficult, requiring 12–16 indigenous people to help carry them.

Feldt then conceived the necessity of the positioning of Coastwatchers so that they formed a virtual fence reaching from the Dutch border with New Guinea to the eastern side of the Solomon Islands. He proposed that teleradios be loaned to selected persons at strategic points to close any gaps in the Coastwatching chain. Where there were no suitable people Feldt requested a naval person be sent. This being done, the fence was built and the gates shut.

Feldt gave his organisation the code name of "Ferdinand", taking the name from a children's book about a bull, The Story of Ferdinand which had been popularised by a Walt Disney cartoon in 1938. It appealed to Feldt because "Ferdinand ... did not fight but sat under a tree and just smelled the flowers." It was meant as a reminder to coastwatchers that it was not their duty to fight and so draw attention to themselves, but to sit circumspectly and unobtrusively, gathering information. Of course, like their titular prototype, they could fight if they were stung.

Feldt established a team of coastwatchers, many of whom were expatriate Australians.

The Coastwatchers headquarters was moved to Townsville in May 1941. When the War in the Pacific commenced at the end of 1941, Feldt's responsibilities for his Coastwatchers increased, as the Japanese advance left the island screen as the front line. He insisted the Coastwatchers be given military standing which would provide them some income and protection for their widows via a pension, should the worst outcome occur. In April 1942 the Coastwatchers became members of the Royal Australian Naval Volunteer Reserve (RANVR). By this time many of them were behind enemy lines.

As Supervising Intelligence Officer (SIO), Feldt's duties were varied and demanding. As well as evaluation of intelligence, coding and de-coding, many other practical issues required overseeing. These included organising supplies such as food, uniforms, radio parts and parachutes to drop the latter, arranging finance for the supplies and organising submarines, PT boats and aircraft to retrieve downed airmen, sailors and coastwatchers who were ill or injured and placing new coastwatchers in their stead.

To Feldt, the needs of his coastwatchers were first and foremost. They, in turn, were extremely loyal to him. He worked for long hours throughout 1942 and into 1943. He suffered the loss of his best friend, Bill Kyle, whom he had recruited as a coastwatcher. Kyle was captured and executed by the Japanese.

The Coastwatchers made many significant contributions to the war in the Pacific but none more so than in the Battle for Guadalcanal. Messages from Read and Mason, such as "24 bombers headed yours" gave the American fighter aircraft a distinct advantage with time to be in the air as a "welcoming party" for the Japanese planes. This happened many times over and was of such significance that US Admiral of the Fleet William F. "Bull" Halsey said: "The coast watchers saved the Guadalcanal and Guadalcanal saved the South Pacific."

Besides their vital intelligence gathering, the Coastwatchers rescued 321 downed Allied airman, 280 sailors, 75 prisoners of war, 190 missionaries and civilians.

The responsibility and demands of leadership eventually took its toll on Feldt. While making a personal visit to some of his Coastwatchers in Guadalcanal in 1943, he suffered a heart attack, at the age of 44, and resigned his command. Commander J. C. McManus succeeded Feldt. While recuperating in Brisbane in 1943, Feldt commenced writing his personal account. His book The Coast Watchers was published in 1946.

== Post War ==
Feldt and Long were both present at the opening of the Coastwatchers Memorial Lighthouse at Madang in 1959. Feldt unveiled the plaque at the base of the lighthouse which held the names of the thirty-six men who had given their lives.

On a visit to Australia in 1954, Admiral Halsey expressed his thanks and recognition of the role played by Feldt and his Coastwatchers and by saying "I could get down on my knees every night and thank God for Commander Eric Feldt."

Feldt was awarded an OBE in 1944, as Australians received British honours at this time.

Eric Feldt died of a heart attack on 14 March 1968 in New Farm, Brisbane. He was cremated and his ashes scattered into the sea off the Coastwatchers Memorial Lighthouse at Madang.
