= Nathan Twining =

Nathan Twining may refer to:

- Nathan F. Twining, United States Air Force general
- Nathan Crook Twining, United States Navy admiral
