= Let George do it =

"Let George do it" is an English idiom of the 20th century, recommending that some (unspecified) person rather than oneself should perform a given task. An occasional comic variant is to let "Jack" - the supposed brother of George - do it instead.

Let George Do It can also refer to:

- Let George Do It (radio), American radio drama 1946 – 1954
- Let George Do It!, 1940 British film (American title: To Hell With Hitler)
- Let George Do It (1938 film), Australian comedy (British title: In the Nick of Time)
- Let George Do It (film series), American comedy short series of the 1920s
- Faciat Georgius (English: "Let George do it"), an informal American medal of World War II

== See also ==
- Georges d'Amboise, referent of the French idiom "Laissez faire à Georges" (English: "Let George do it")
