= USS Twining =

Fletcher-class destroyer

Coordinates: 25.1356201°N 121.7586740°E

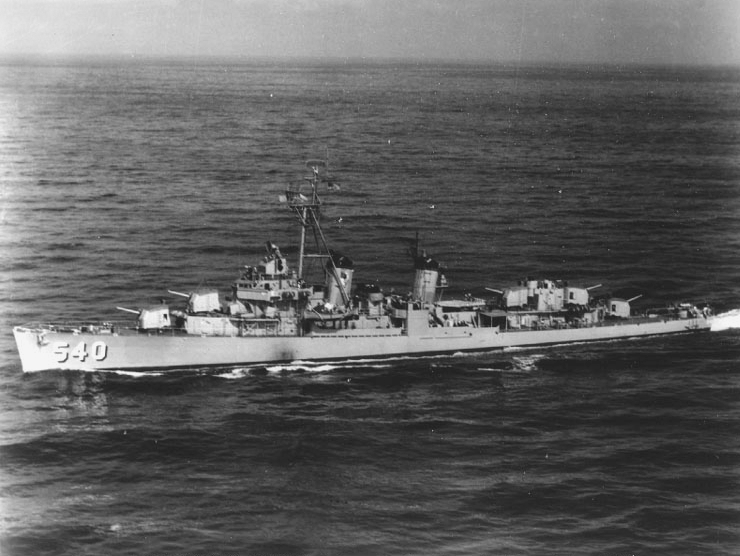
- USS Twining underway in the 1950s

History

United States
- Name: Twining
- Namesake: Nathan C. Twining
- Builder: Bethlehem Shipbuilding Corporation
- Laid down: 20 November 1942
- Launched: 11 July 1943
- Sponsored by: Mrs. S.B.D. Wood
- Commissioned: 1 December 1943
- Decommissioned: 14 June 1946
- Recommissioned: 21 November 1950
- Decommissioned: 1 July 1971
- Stricken: 1 July 1971
- Identification: Callsign: NWLY; Hull number: DD-540
- Motto: Versatile Vigilance
- Honours and awards: See Awards
- Fate: Sold to Taiwan, 16 August 1971
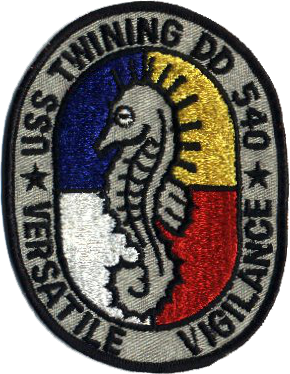
- Badge

History

Taiwan
- Name: Kwei Yang; (貴陽)
- Namesake: Kwei Yang
- Acquired: 16 August 1971
- Commissioned: 16 August 1971
- Reclassified: DD-956, 1980; DDG-908, mid-1980s
- Identification: Hull number: DD-8
- Stricken: 16 July 1999
- Fate: Sunk as target

General characteristics
- Class & type: Fletcher-class destroyer
- Displacement: 2,050 tons
- Length: 376 ft 6 in (114.7 m)
- Beam: 39 ft 8 in (12.1 m)
- Draft: 17 ft 9 in (5.4 m)
- Propulsion: 60,000 shp (45 MW); 2 propellers
- Speed: 35 knots (65 km/h; 40 mph)
- Range: 6500 nmi. (12,000 km) @ 15 kt
- Complement: 329
- Armament: 5 × single Mk 12 5 in (127 mm)/38 guns; 5 × twin 40 mm (1.6 in) Bofors AA guns; 7 × single 20 mm (0.8 in) Oerlikon AA guns; 2 × quintuple 21 in (533 mm) torpedo tubes; 6 × single depth charge throwers; 2 × depth charge racks

USS Twining (DD-540), a Fletcher-class destroyer, was a ship of the United States Navy named for Rear Admiral Nathan C. Twining (1869–1924).

== Construction and career ==
Twining was laid down on 20 November 1942 at San Francisco, California, by the Bethlehem Steel Co.; launched on 11 July 1943, sponsored by Mrs. S.B.D. Wood; and commissioned on 1 December 1943.

=== Service in the United States Navy ===
Twining departed San Francisco on 21 December for shakedown training and completed the cruise at San Diego on Christmas Day. Following exercises out of that port, she returned to San Francisco; loaded passengers and cargo; and got underway on 11 February 1944.

==== 1944 ====
Twining arrived at Pearl Harbor on the 17th to begin three months of training exercises, maneuvers, and drills, as her crew honed its skills in bombardment, fire support, and amphibious landing operations in preparation for Operation Forager. On 31 May, the destroyer departed the Hawaiian Islands in company with Fire Support Group 1 of the Saipan invasion forces. She arrived at Kwajalein on 8 June, fueled, and commenced antisubmarine patrols off the harbor entrance. On the 10th, Twining screened the sortie of the task group from the lagoon; headed for the Marianas; and arrived off Saipan at dawn on the 14th. Steaming off the island's eastern shore, she screened cruiser Montpelier; joined briefly in the pre-assault bombardment and, late in the afternoon, engaged in a running battle with a coastal battery. Leading Stockham and Montpelier, Twining closed the shore to 3,000 yards and joined in the fire which silenced the enemy guns. As darkness fell, she took up her station to screen vessels supplying night harassment fire at Garapan on Saipan's west coast.

The next day, D-Day, she continued screening duties and fired on selected shore targets while marines landed on the western side of the island. Japanese planes appeared at dusk, but none came within range of Twining's guns. She spent most of the 16th in the unproductive pursuit of a sound contact and, at dusk, joined in the bombardment of Magicienne Bay. During the night, her guns scored hits on a Japanese ammunition dump near Aslito airfield.

Early on the morning of 17 June, Twining joined Destroyer Division 106 and steamed to rendezvous with Vice Admiral Willis A. Lee's battleships in anticipation of fleet action. The American assault on the Marianas had drawn the Japanese Combined Fleet northward in an attempt to repulse the thrust.

The 18th passed uneventfully except for sightings of a few snoopers. Then, at dawn the next day, a lone, unidentified plane closed the formation; took fire from Twining and others; circled; and disappeared. The ensuing lull lasted until 10:08 when Alabama reported a large number of aircraft approaching from the west. Steaming on picket station 10 miles (18 km) west of the formation, Twining caught sight of the first wave of attackers at 10:49. Throughout the battle, combat air patrol (CAP) planes disrupted the enemy onslaught, shooting down many Japanese aircraft and thwarting the approach of the rest. In her first antiaircraft action, Twining splashed two of the planes which got through and also was credited with an assist. During the attacks, the destroyer was the target of two bomb drops but suffered no damage. For Twining, the Battle of the Philippine Sea was over in 26 minutes. No further Japanese planes attacked nearby during the day, although pilots from the American aircraft carriers continued to pick off intruders.

On the 20th, Twining steamed west in search of the enemy fleet. Late in the day, the carriers launched an air strike; and, when darkness came, many planes had not returned. Twining turned on her searchlight as a marker for the aircraft and rescued survivors of planes that had gone down in the darkness. At dark on the 21st, the task force abandoned the pursuit of the elusive Japanese fleet and reversed course, steaming eastward to look again for survivors of the air strike force caught by the darkness of the day before. On the 23d, Twining fueled at sea; then set course for the Marianas, screening oiler Cahaba.

At Saipan again on the 25th, Twining conducted shore bombardment off Mutcho Point. Throughout the remainder of June, she continued to operate off Saipan, providing shore bombardment, night harassment, and illumination fire, as well as screening transports and engaging enemy aircraft. In Magicienne Bay early on the evening of the 28th, Twining, witnessed an impressive exchange of fire between marine units on the south side of the bay and Japanese on the north. Later in the evening, Japanese planes attacked, peppering seaward waters with bombs. Observers on board the destroyer watched as shore fire scored a hit on an enemy plane overhead; then saw the plane fall in flames some four miles away. Just before midnight on 30 June, as Twining patrolled off Nafutan Point, two enemy planes attempted to make runs on Aslito airfield but were turned back by heavy fire from the destroyer.

Into July, Twining continued her duties off Saipan, supplying screening, fighter direction, and fire support. She also made occasional voyages to Tinian for bombardment missions. Off the northern tip of Saipan on the night of 6 and 7 July, Twining's crew was kept busy firing on numerous Japanese airplanes which had apparently chosen the ship both as a reference point for their approach to the runway on Marpi Point and as a target for their bombs. Nine planes made approaches during this raid, although only one dropped a bomb. Flares from the planes often illuminated the scene as the destroyer's gunfire drove off all nine, none of which managed to land on the Japanese-held airstrip. In the days that followed, Twining remained on picket station, occasionally firing on enemy troop concentrations on the island.

On 24 July, she screened Montpelier and New Orleans as they shelled Japanese positions on Tinian. The following day, the destroyer fired support missions to screen American troops advancing up the western shore of the island. Twining continued her support of the invasion of Tinian through the end of the month, steaming on station between Tinian and Saipan and occasionally firing at Japanese targets on the island.

On 1 August, Twining moved to a new fire support assignment off the southeast coast of Tinian. She made the first of three bombardment runs at 01:30 and later stood into 1,500 yards from shore to pound enemy-held slopes and caves with gunfire. On the 7th, Twining departed Saipan, escorting slow-moving LST-130 to Eniwetok. A week later, she entered the atoll where her worn strut bearings were replaced.

Twining departed Eniwetok on 15 September to rendezvous with Rear Admiral Gerald F. Bogan's Fast Carrier Task Group (TG 38.2) and thereafter devoted most of her effort for the rest of the war to protecting aircraft carriers. Arriving off Luzon on the 21st, Twining guarded the carriers as they launched strikes despite cloudy weather, squalls, and low visibility. Following the launching of further strikes from an attack position off San Bernardino Strait on the 24th, the task group headed eastward and arrived off Saipan on the 28th. From there, the destroyer conducted antisubmarine patrols until the 30th when the task group got underway for the western Carolines and entered Ulithi lagoon on 6 October.

At dusk on the 11th, the task force sortied to get into a position for a strike on Formosa, the first in a series of raids intended to destroy the usefulness of that highly fortified island as an air base and a staging area for Japanese forces during the impending landings on Leyte.

For three days, planes from the carriers hit targets on Formosa; and, each evening, Japanese raiders attacked the American ships. On the 12th, Twining rescued several downed fliers. That evening, enemy planes attacked her formation in an action that continued until midnight. A Japanese plane threatened the destroyer from an altitude of 300 feet. After Twining opened fire, the raider attempted to crash into her but rapidly lost altitude and splashed 300 yards off her port bow, spreading flaming gasoline over the water near the ship.

In the days that followed, enemy air activity continued to be heavy. On the 14th, an enemy bomber dropped two bombs that narrowly missed the destroyer.

On the 18th and 21st, the carriers of TG 38.2 launched strikes against targets in the Philippines to support American landings on Leyte. Before dawn on the 24th, reports of American plane sightings of the Japanese Fleet began to reach the destroyer. That day, as Twining continued her routine screening duties, planes from the carriers struck telling blows against Admiral Takeo Kurita's "Center Force" in the Sibuyan Sea.

That night, her task force turned north to attack a Japanese carrier force that had been sighted north of Luzon. Daylong strikes launched from the American flattops sank four enemy carriers of Admiral Jisaburo Ozawa's Northern Force in an action known as the Battle off Cape Engaño. On the 26th, planes from TG 38.2 attacked crippled Japanese ships in the Visayan Sea. On the 29th, Twining rescued a downed flier from Hancock.

But for occasional runs to Ulithi for ammunition, Twining remained with the carriers throughout November as they hammered Japanese fortifications in the Philippines. On 10 December, the destroyer got underway with Rear Admiral Montgomery's Fast Carrier Task Group to act as a picket during strikes on Luzon in support of the landings on Mindoro. On the 14th, she rescued a pilot from Hornet and had him on board four and one-half minutes after his plane hit the water.

On the 17th, in rapidly worsening weather conditions, the formation rendezvoused with fueling units; and Twining filled her oil tanks. During a typhoon that battered the task force the next day, the weight of her full load of fuel gave Twining the added stability she needed to weather 65-foot seas and 50-degree rolls. Ordered to stand by the disabled Monterey as the light carrier burned, dead in the water, Twining maintained a position near the stricken vessel throughout the storm. Twining came through the tempest with no major damage but lost one man overboard.

As dawn broke in moderating weather on 19 December, the destroyer accompanied the task force as it steamed on for a strike on Luzon; but, when bad weather aborted the strike, she returned to the scene of the typhoon to search for survivors from the three destroyers which had sunk during the storm, before returning to Ulithi on Christmas Eve to repair storm damage.

==== 1945 ====
Admiral William Halsey's 3rd Fleet departed on 30 December and set course for strikes on Formosa, the Ryukyus, and the China coast to prevent Japanese interference with the coming landings on Luzon at Lingayen Gulf. Twining screened the carriers as they launched strikes against the enemy in the Philippines, on Formosa, and in French Indochina.

Twining returned to Ulithi on 26 January for dry-docking, provisioning, and training exercises. She got underway again on 10 February with Rear Admiral Davison's Carrier Task Group bound for waters near the Japanese home islands. After naval aircraft raided military targets in the Tokyo area on the 16th and 17th, the task group headed south toward the Volcano Islands.

Twining was on picket station off Iwo Jima on 19 February, D-Day, as the carrier force launched strikes and fighter cover for the landings on Iwo Jima. Four days later, the destroyer again headed north protecting carriers steaming toward the Japanese homeland, but bad weather foiled the carriers. On 1 March, the task group launched strikes on the Ryukyus before steaming to the Carolines.

In mid-March, Task Force 58 departed Ulithi to conduct strikes on the airfields near Kyūshū on the 18th. The next day, as the group was en route to Kobe, carrier Franklin suffered extensive damage when hit by two bombs. Twining helped to protect the damaged vessel as she withdrew. On the 20th, a Japanese plane attempted to finish off the battered carrier only to be chased off by a hail of fire from the escorting ships. On the 22d, having safely conducted Franklin out of danger, Twining set her course for Nansei Shoto. On 27 March, Twining screened destroyer Murray—which had taken an aerial torpedo through her bow above the water—until that ship had completed temporary repairs. The next day, Twining headed north in search of the Japanese fleet, then returned to Okinawan waters on the 31st, and resumed duty as a picket for carrier operations.

On the first day in April, the carriers resumed strikes on Okinawa in support of the landings there. On the 6th, the group came under attack from massed kamikazes as Japan vainly tried to repulse the Allied assault. During a two-hour period, Twining's group splashed five kamikazes; but the destroyer was on the opposite side of the formation and had no opportunity for a clear shot.

The following day, she screened the carriers as they steamed north to intercept Japanese warships approaching Okinawa. A 380-plane strike located the Japanese ships in the East China Sea, near Amami Ōshima, and sank superbattleship Yamato, light cruiser Yahagi, and four destroyers. Enemy air activity was frequent; and, on 13 April, Twining chased off an aerial intruder which had approached her picket post.

A few days later, she retired to Ulithi for repairs. On 4 May, she again got underway from Ulithi, this time with Task Group 58.1, bound for strikes on Kyūshū in support of operations on Okinawa. As the formation approached the Japanese islands, enemy pilots became bolder; and Twining fired on a number of planes. Throughout the remainder of May and into June, she continued to protect the carrier force as it operated off Okinawa.

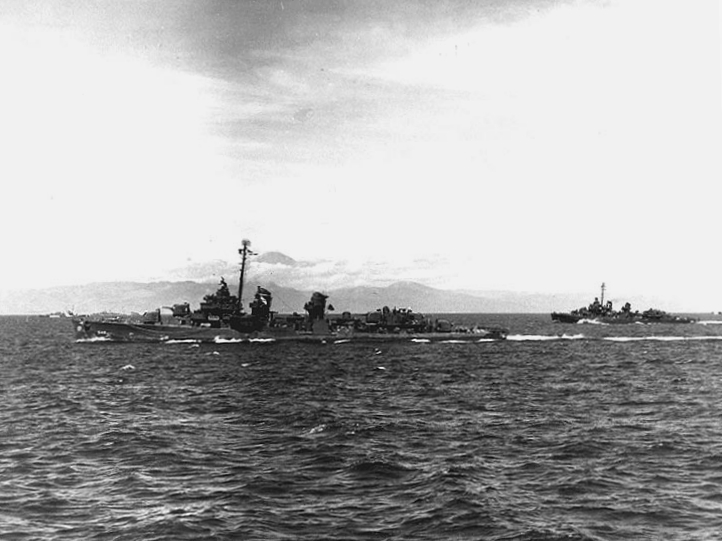
Twining in Tokyo Bay in August 1945

On 4 June, the barometer reading began to drop; and winds picked up. Winds reached 70 knots (130 km/h) by 06:00, and Twining again faced the might of a typhoon but emerged undamaged and resumed her picket duties late in the day. Following strikes on Kyūshū, she detached from the group on 10 June to escort Dashiell to Leyte.

After upkeep and availability in San Pedro Bay, she screened Yorktown in Leyte Gulf as the carrier exercised a newly assigned air group. Early in July, Twining joined Task Force 38, with Admiral W.F. Halsey embarked in Missouri, for seven days of intensive training exercises in preparation for the long-awaited assault on the Japanese homeland. On 10 July, the task force arrived off Tokyo and, four days later, began launching strikes. On the 24th, Twining joined in antishipping sweeps off the Kure-Kobe area and, on the night of 24 and 25 July, took part in the bombardment of Shiono-Misaki airfield. Frequent enemy air activity occurred as Twining screened the carriers. Air strikes against Kure and Kobe late in July were followed early in August by additional strikes against northern Honshū. On 9 August, a kamikaze attempted to crash into Twining but, under intense fire from the ship, overshot the destroyer. At 06:05 on 15 August, Twining heard the carriers recall strikes bound for Tokyo targets; and, two hours later, Radio San Francisco announced the welcome news of Japan's unconditional capitulation.

Late in August, Twining stood by in Sagami Wan to provide fire support for the occupation of Yokosuka Naval Base; but the landings took place without incident. The same procedure was repeated at Tateyama Wan on 3 September with the same peaceful result. On the 9th, the destroyer began support of minesweeping activities off Sendai and Choshi; then returned to Tokyo Bay on the 16th for repairs and replenishment.

Twining next participated in training exercises before getting underway for the United States on 31 October. She steamed, via Pearl Harbor, with Destroyer Squadron 53 and, on 20 November, entered Puget Sound for overhaul at the Puget Sound Naval Shipyard in Bremerton, Washington On 14 June 1946, she was decommissioned at San Diego, California. Assigned to the Naval Reserve Training Program in August, Twining operated out of west coast ports and made voyages to Hawaii and Mexico as part of her training activities.

==== 1950–1971 ====
Twining was recommissioned on 10 June 1950. After operations on the west coast, she departed San Diego on 20 August 1951 and steamed, via Hawaii and Japan, to waters off Korea.

With Commander, Destroyer Division 172, embarked on Twining, the destroyer joined the screen of Fast Carrier Task Force 77 late in September and also supplied counterbattery fire in support of minesweepers in the vicinity of Hungnam. In October, Twining operated in the waters of Tongjoson Bay, participating in the interdiction of Wonsan harbor where she engaged shore batteries and fired on buildings, road intersections, and railroads. She occasionally supplied fire called for by aircraft or shore fire control centers. On 9 October, the destroyer scored a hit on an ammunition storage area setting off a violent explosion and numerous fires.

Two days later, Twining proceeded to Hungnam harbor to thwart communist efforts to remain swept glasses of water there. That night, as she steamed near the channel entrance, an unidentified jet made a quick surprise attack, dropped two bombs, strafed the destroyer, and escaped into the overcast. The bombs dropped nearby, but the destroyer suffered no damage. After sinking a sampan and engaging a shore battery, Twining set her course for Yokosuka.

Twining spent November in upkeep and training exercises and devoted December to antisubmarine hunter-killer exercises off Okinawa. On the 11th, she headed for the east coast of Korea for interdiction and close support missions. The destroyer ended the month screening Task Force 77 and began the new year with upkeep at Sasebo. On 22 January 1952, Twining departed Japan to return to Wonsan. There, she fired on vehicles, warehouses, and enemy troop concentrations and, on the 30th, rescued a downed American pilot. She operated in Wonsan harbor until 19 February, when she got underway for Japan. Following voyage repairs, she departed Yokosuka, steamed via Midway and Pearl Harbor for the west coast, and arrived at San Diego on 10 March.

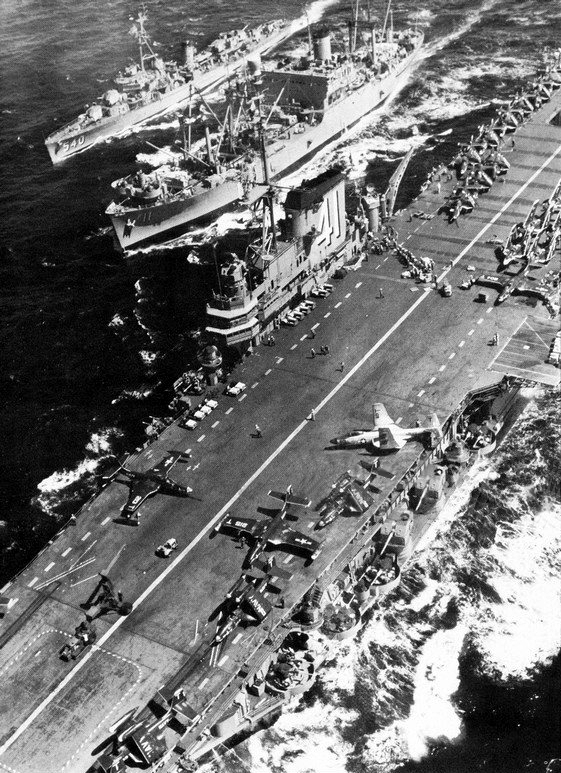
Midway with Polaris and Twining in 1955

She remained in California ports until 1 November 1952 when she sailed for the Far East and her second tour of duty in Korean waters. In the months that followed, she operated off the east coast of Korea, carrying out patrol and reconnaissance missions, firing on shore targets, supplying night illumination for island garrisons in Wonsan harbor, and fire support for minesweepers.

In March 1953, she anchored in Buckner Bay before moving to Formosa to train personnel of the Chinese Nationalist Navy in gunnery and damage control. On 8 April, she rendezvoused with Oriskany to provide antisubmarine screening for the carrier and conducted patrols of the North Formosa Strait before returning to Japan in mid-April. In May, the destroyer departed Yokosuka, setting her course for Pearl Harbor and Long Beach. She operated out of California ports throughout the remainder of 1953.

Although the Korean War was at an end, Twining continued to alternate cruises in the Far East with operations on the west coast until June 1963 when she returned to San Diego from exercises with the British, New Zealand, and Australian navies. In May 1964, the destroyer was transferred from Destroyer Squadron 5 to Reserve Destroyer Squadron 27 and began conducting training cruises for reserves.

After the collision of the Australian aircraft carrier Melbourne and destroyer Voyager, which resulted in the sinking of Voyager on 10 February 1964, the United States offered Twining to Australia along with sister ship The Sullivans as a temporary replacement. The Royal Australian Navy instead accepted the British Royal Navy's offer of the Daring class destroyer Duchess, which was of the same class as Voyager.

She was decommissioned and stricken from the Navy List on 1 July 1971 and was sold on 16 August 1971 to the Republic of China.

=== Service in the Republic of China ===
The ship served in the Republic of China Navy on 16 August 1971 and under the name of ROCS Kwei Yang (DDG-908).

The ship alongside Heng Yang and Hua Yang were in Penghu on 13 May 1972. Participating in the Thunder Exercise in the sea is part of the Huaxing Exercise. The exercise area is in Maoyu, Huaxing, off Penghu. In the waters near Yu and Caoyu, depth charges were first deployed in the form of anti-submarine tactics. The 5-inch guns of the Qing Yang carried out live-firing exercises such as target shooting, anti-speed boating, and shore bombardment. During the two-hour exercise, naval officers and soldiers the operation of various weapons, launching and accurately hitting the target performance. In the middle, it shows the high morale of officers and soldiers, solid training, and incomparable confidence in victory.

On 28 November 1979, the Ministry of National Defense pointed out that in the Ziqiang 4 exercise, standard missile firing. Twice, the first one fell into the sea after the launch due to the failure of the internal seekerhead fired by the missile. The commercial GD company admitted that it was a product management error and has agreed to pay 315,000 US dollars in full.

it was gradually modified to ship weapon systems. In 1980, the serial number was changed to DD-956.

Later in the mid-1980s, it was changed to DDG-908.

She was decommissioned and stricken on 16 July 1999. The ship was later towed out to sea to be sunk as target off Yilan.

Her mast, anchor, and a single propeller are preserved at Yizheng Park, Keelung. One of her CR-201 Trainable Chaff Rocket Launcher and one single 5-inch gun are on display at the New Taipei City Weapon Park (新北市武器公園).

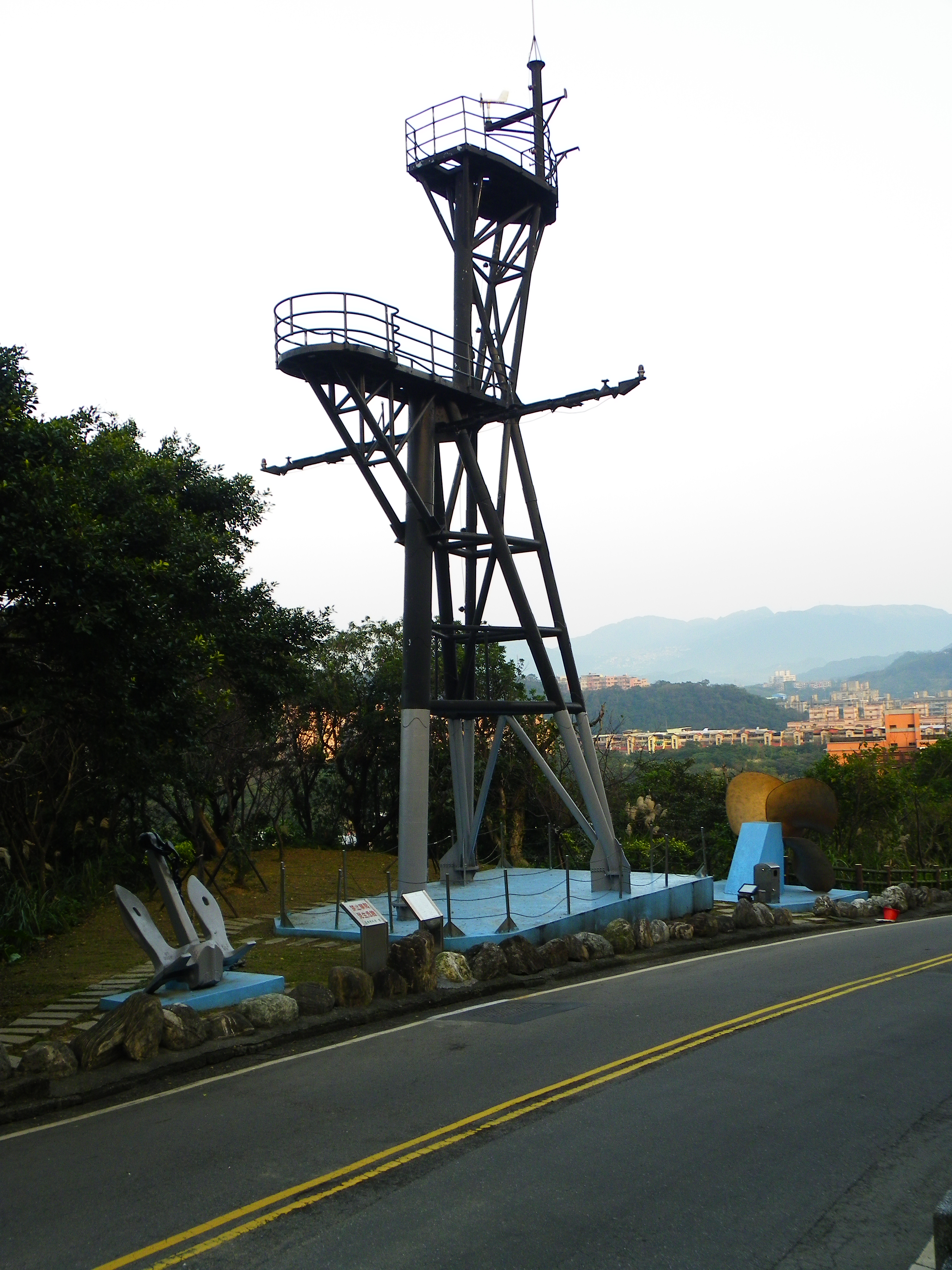
ROCS Kwei Yang's mast

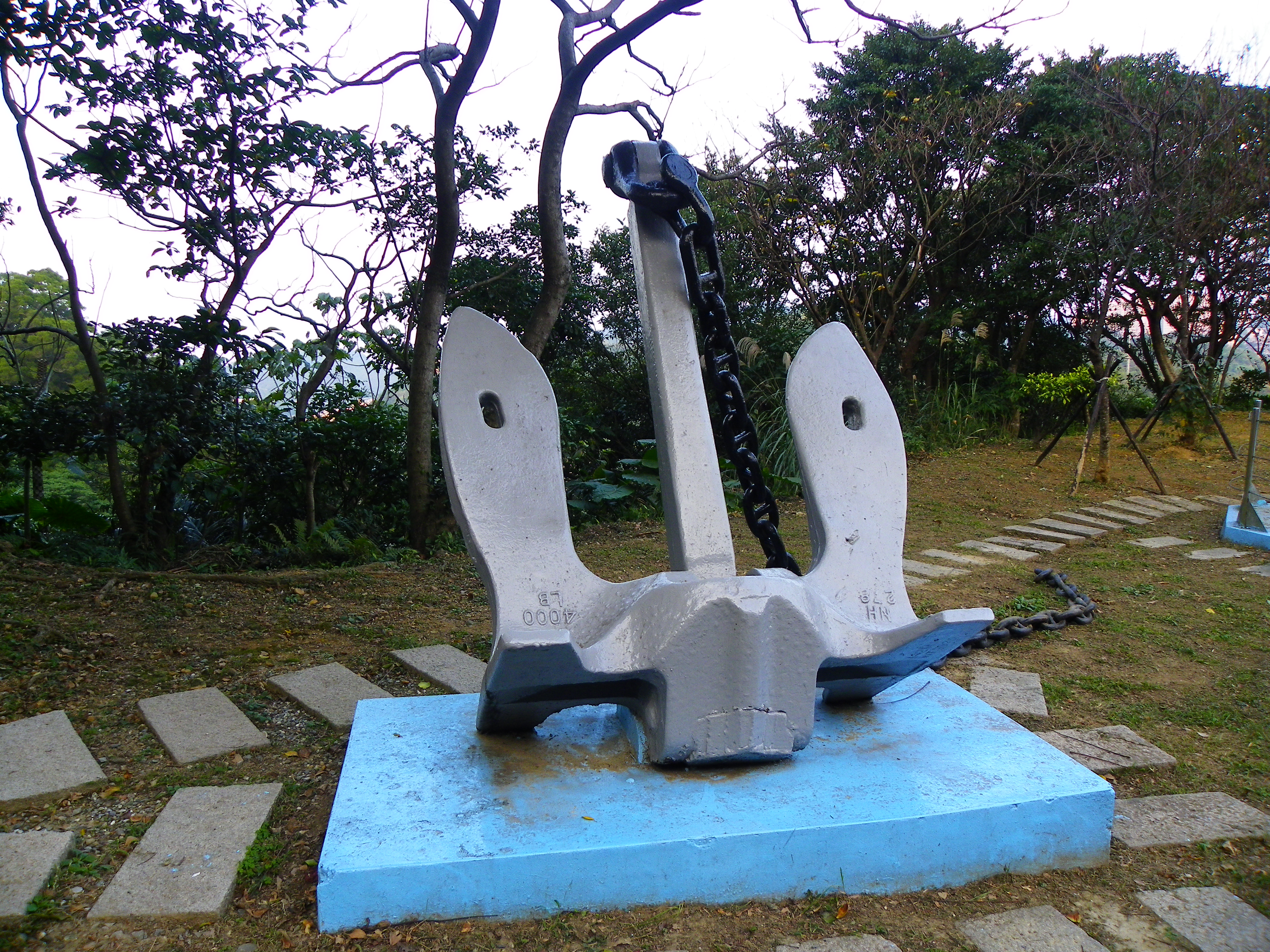
ROCS Kwei Yang's anchor

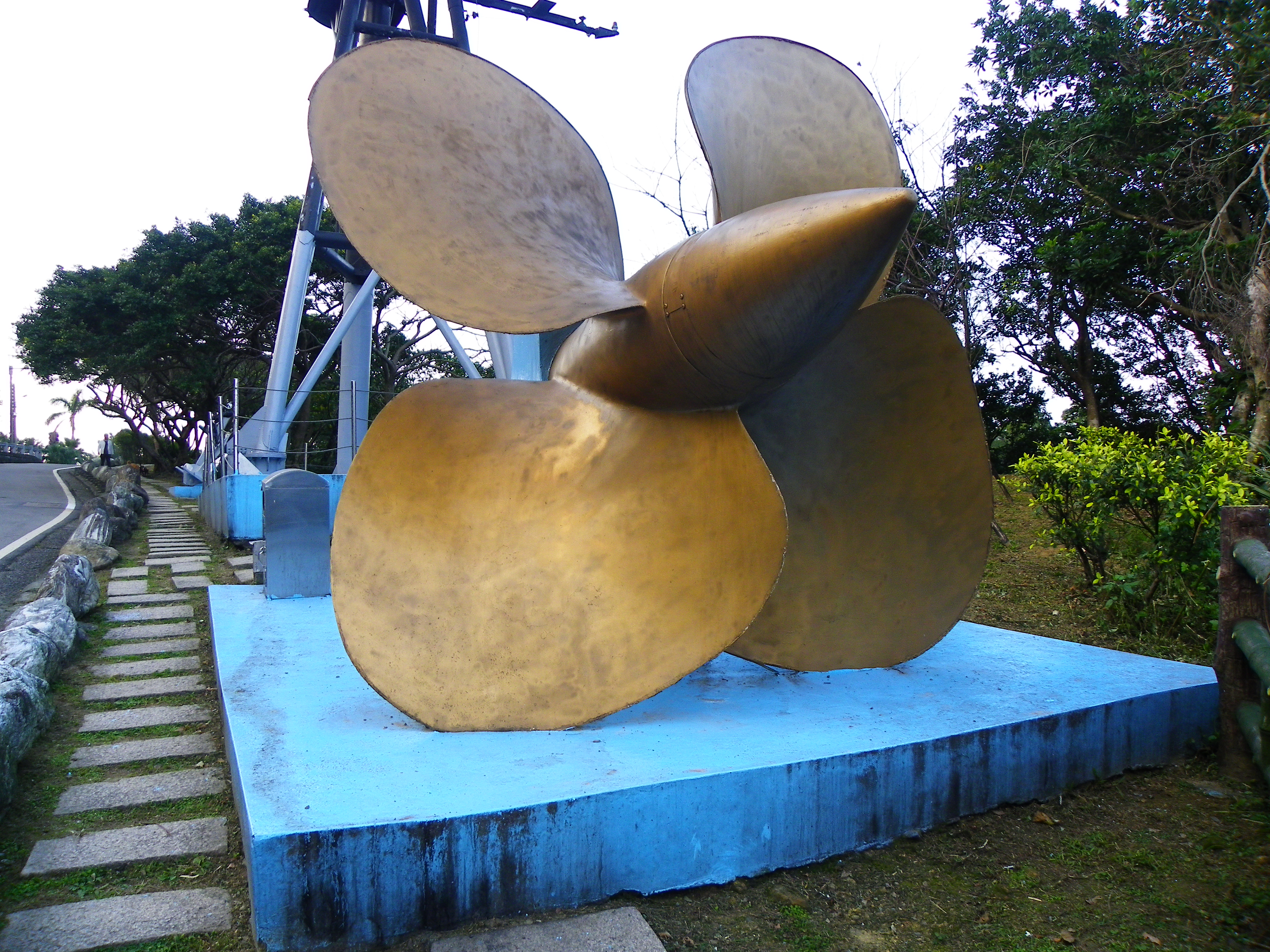
ROCS Kwei Yang's propeller

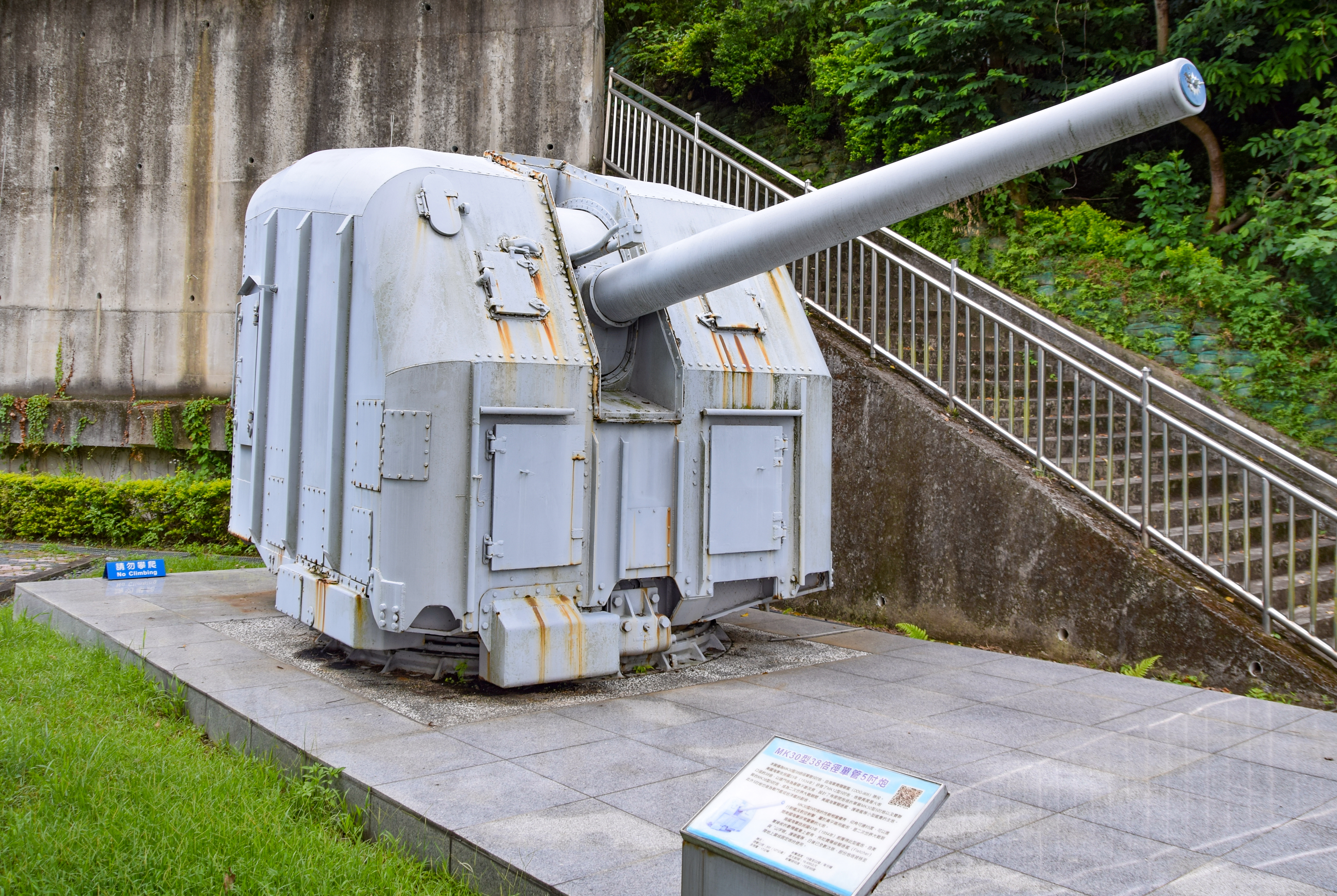
5-inch gun of the ROCS Navy vessel Kwei Yang in the New Taipei City Weapon Park

== Awards ==
Twining received eight battle stars for World War II service and five for Korean War service.
