= George F. Schulgen =

American army personnel

- Born: George Francis Schulgen; April 23, 1900; Traverse City, Michigan, US
- Died: February 16, 1955 (aged 54); Suttons Bay, Michigan
- Education: Michigan State University (B.S.)
- Military career
- Branch: United States Army (1924–1947); United States Air Force (1947–1949)
- Service years: 1924–1949
- Rank: Brigadier general
- Units: Air Materiel Command; United States Department of War; First Air Force; Philadelphia Air Defense Wing; Southeast Asia Command; Air Intelligence Requirements Division; Directorate of Public Relations
- Conflicts: World War II
- Awards: Legion of Merit; World War I Victory Medal; American Defense Service Medal; American Campaign Medal; Asiatic-Pacific Campaign Medal; European-African-Middle Eastern Campaign Medal; World War II Victory Medal; Army General Staff Identification Badge

George Francis Schulgen (April 23, 1900 - February 16, 1955) was an officer of the United States Army Air Forces during World War II.

== Early life and career ==
Schulgen was born and raised in Traverse City, Michigan. He served in the Student Army Training Corps in high school before enrolling at Michigan State University, where he graduated in 1922 with a bachelor's degree in mechanical engineering.

Schulgen enlisted into the United States Army Air Service on March 11, 1924. He graduated from the Air Service Advanced Flying School at Kelly Field, Texas before becoming commander of the 17th Pursuit Squadron stationed at Selfridge Field in Michigan. Further service followed at Clark Field in the Philippines, Langley Field in Virginia, and Wright Field in Ohio.

== World War II ==
Shortly after the United States entered World War II in December 1941, Schulgen, then a lieutenant colonel, was assigned to Washington, D.C. to serve as Assistant Secretary to the War Department General Staff. In July 1943 he was promoted to brigadier general and was given command of the Philadelphia Fighter Wing, before quickly being made Chief of Staff of the First Air Force, then commanded by Major General Ralph Royce.

In January 1944, Schulgen was transferred to the South West Pacific Area, before eventually being stationed in Kandy, Sri Lanka to serve on the staff of Royal Navy Admiral Louis Mountbatten, Commander of the South East Asia Command, serving as Director of Plans and later as a member of Mountbatten's War Planning Staff. He would eventually be transferred back to Washington in June 1945, where he would serve as Deputy Director of the Army's Civil Affairs Division under Army Chief of Staff George C. Marshall.

Following the war, Schulgen took part in Operation Blacklist Forty, the postwar American occupation of South Korea.

== UFO Investigations ==
In July 1947, Schulgen, then Chief of the Air Intelligence Requirements Division, ordered an investigation into the 1947 flying disc craze, requesting the assistance of the Federal Bureau of Investigation in "locating and questioning the individuals who first sighted the so‐called flying discs", believing that reports of sightings had been spread by communists to cause mass hysteria. In September, Army Air Force General Nathan F. Twining issued a memorandum to Schulgen that noted that unidentified flying objects spotted by military personnel warranted further investigation.

On October 28, 1947, three months following the Roswell incident, Brigadier General Schulgen issued a memorandum to General of the Army Henry H. Arnold that described the physical characteristics and capabilities of the craft recovered at the incident and discussed the possibilities of said craft being of extraterrestrial origin. Schulgen's report stated:

"This strange object, or phenomenon, may be considered, in view of certain observations, as long-range aircraft capable of a high rate of climb, high cruising speed and highly maneuverable and capable of being flown in very tight formations. For the purpose of analysis and evaluation of these so-called "flying saucers," the object sighted is being assumed to be a manned craft of unknown origin. While there remains the possibility of Russian manufacture, based on perspective thinking and actual accomplishments of the Germans, it is the considered opinion of some elements that the object may in fact represent interplanetary craft of some kind."

== Later career and death ==
Following the establishment of the United States Air Force in 1947, Brigadier General Schulgen was made Director of Plans and Policies in the Air Force's Directorate of Public Relations. He announced his retirement from the Air Force on December 31, 1948.

Schulgen died suddenly at his home in Suttons Bay, Michigan on February 16, 1955, aged 54. The cause of his death was not disclosed.
