= Merrill B. Twining =

US Marine Corps general (1902–1996)

Merrill Barber Twining
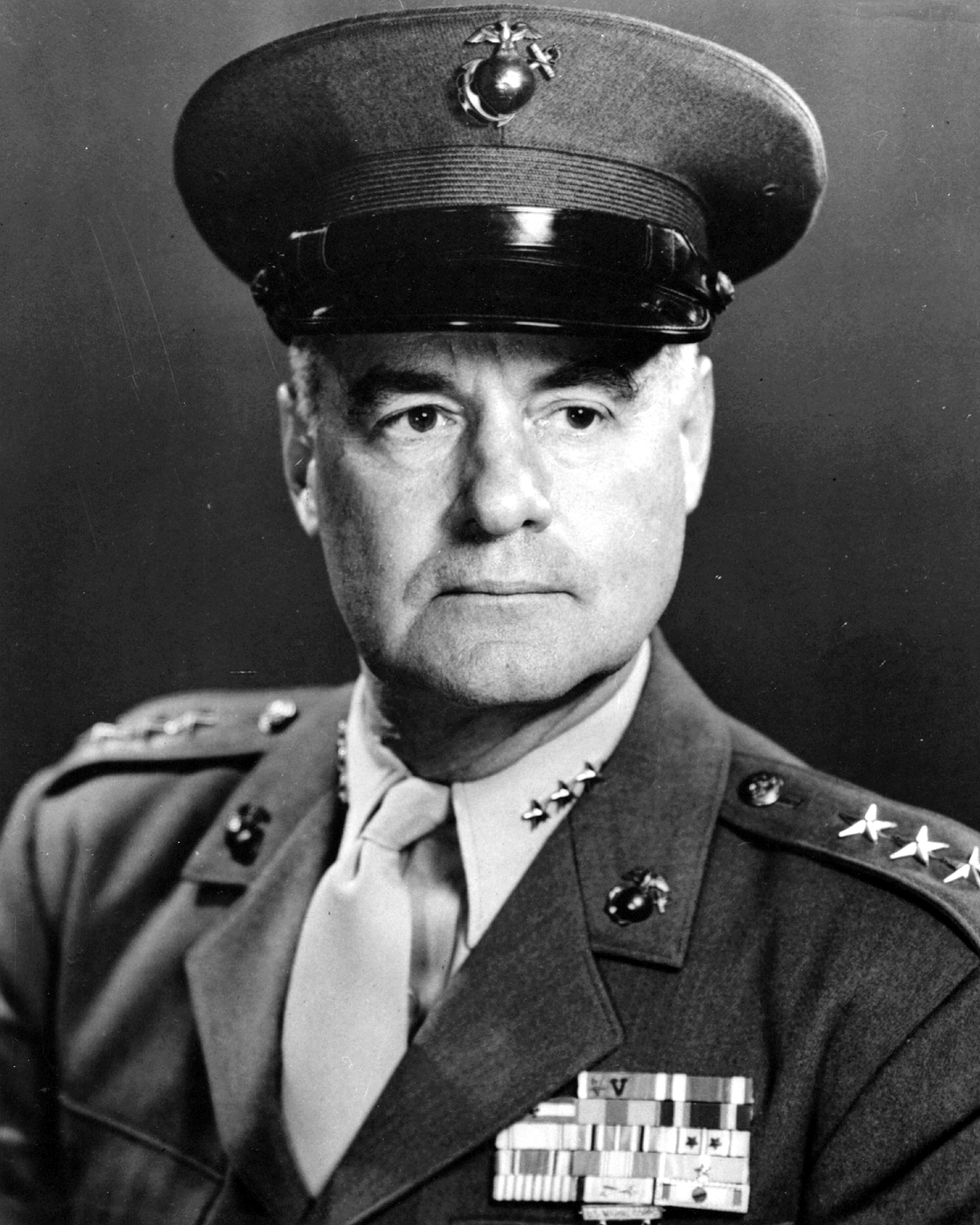
- General Merrill B. Twining
- Born: November 28, 1902; Monroe, Wisconsin, U.S.
- Died: May 11, 1996 (aged 93); Fallbrook, California, U.S.
- Relatives: Nathan F. Twining (brother); Nathan C. Twining (uncle)
- Military career
- Allegiance: United States of America
- Branch: United States Marine Corps
- Service years: 1923–1959
- Rank: General
- Commands: 3rd Marine Division; 1st Marine Division
- Conflicts: World War II; Korean War
- Awards: Legion of Merit (2); Navy Commendation Medal

General Merrill Barber Twining (November 28, 1902 – May 11, 1996) was a United States Marine Corps general who received a "tombstone promotion" to four-star general upon retirement. He was the brother of Air Force General Nathan Farragut Twining, and the nephew of Rear Admiral Nathan Crook Twining.

== Biography ==
Twining was born on November 28, 1902, at Monroe, Wisconsin, and was commissioned a Marine second lieutenant upon graduation from the United States Naval Academy in 1923. During the next two years, he completed the Marine Officers' Basic School, served at Quantico, participated in Caribbean maneuvers with the 10th Marine Regiment, and was stationed at the Marine Barracks, Pensacola, Florida.

Twining was ordered to the Marine barracks at Pearl Harbor in November 1925, and after six months in Hawaii, he sailed for China, via the Philippine Islands. In China he served with the 4th and 12th Marine Regiments at Shanghai, Taku, Hsin Ho, Tientsin, and Peking. He returned to the United States in August 1928. He was promoted to first lieutenant in December 1928 while serving as commander of the Marine barracks at the Pacific Coast Torpedo Station, Keyport, Washington. He then served briefly as editor and publisher of Leatherneck Magazine in Washington, D.C.

In September 1929, Lieutenant Twining was assigned to the Office of the Judge Advocate General of the Navy. While stationed there, he obtained his Bachelor of Laws degree from George Washington University in 1932. He reported again to the Marine barracks at Pearl Harbor in November 1932, remaining there until January 1935. In March 1935, while attached to the Marine barracks at the Naval Air Station, Sunnyvale, California, he earned the Distinguished Pistol Shot's Gold Badge in the Western Division Rifle and Pistol Matches at San Diego, California. He was promoted to captain in May 1935.

From July 1935 to August 1936, Captain Twining was a student in the Army Infantry School, Fort Benning, Georgia. During the next year he served at Philadelphia as an instructor in the Marine Officers' Basic School. Moving to Quantico in June 1937, he served as a company commander with the 5th Marines, and two years later became an instructor in the Marine Corps Schools. He also participated in Caribbean maneuvers in 1938 and 1939. He was promoted to major in July 1939.

In November 1941, Major Twining joined the 1st Marine Division at Camp Lejeune, North Carolina. He was promoted to lieutenant colonel in January 1942 and moved with the division to the Pacific area in May 1942. He earned his first Legion of Merit with Combat "V" for meritorious service from 25 June to 10 December 1942 as the division's assistant operations officer and later, assistant chief of staff, G-3. In that capacity he helped prepare and execute plans for the Guadalcanal Campaign.

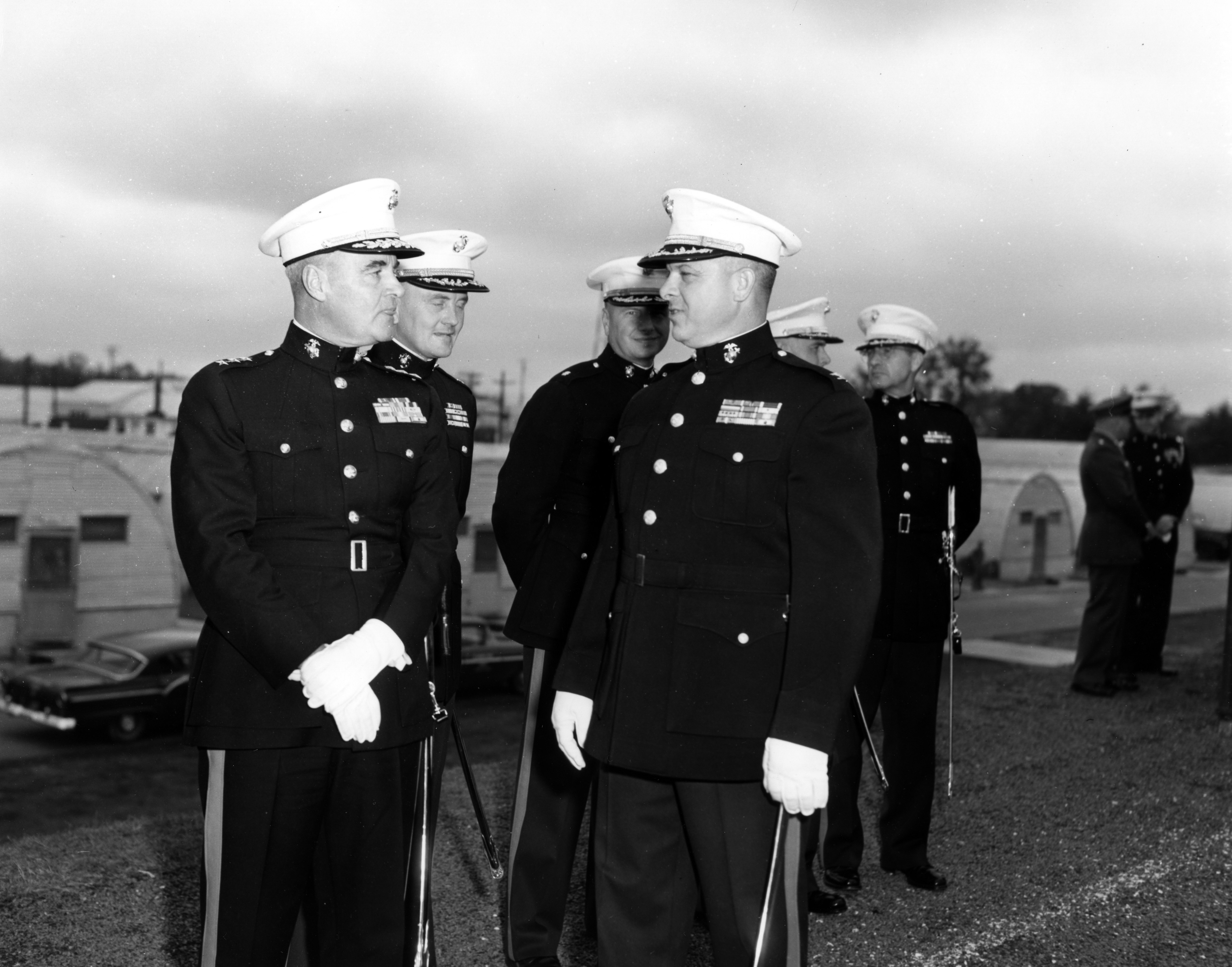
Lieutenant general Merrill B. Twining (left), Commandant, Marine Corps Schools, and Colonel Lowell E. English, Commanding officer, the Basic School, discuss the recent parade they have viewed at the Basic School.

During the planning phase, Lieutenant Colonel Twining and Major William B. McKean were flown over the then Japanese-held island on 17 July 1942, for the first sighting of Guadalcanal by U.S. Marines in World War II. Following the Guadalcanal campaign, he served as assistant chief of staff, G-3, of I Marine Amphibious Corps, then commanded by General Alexander A. Vandegrift.

Returning to the United States in November 1943, Lieutenant Colonel Twining remained until 1947 at the Marine Corps Schools, Quantico. While there, he served successively as chief of operations and training, executive officer, and as a member of the schools' administrative staff. He was promoted to colonel in February 1945.

In August 1947, Colonel Twining reported to Pearl Harbor as chief of staff, Fleet Marine Force, Pacific. The following June, he was named fleet Marine officer on the staff of the commander-in-chief, Pacific Fleet. He served in that capacity until July 1949, when he returned to the Marine Corps Schools as senior resident member of the Marine Corps Board.

In August 1950, he reported to Camp Pendleton and the following month was promoted to brigadier general. He served there as commanding general, Marine Corps Training and Replacement Command, until November 1951, and later as Commander of Fleet Marine Force Troops and commanding general, 3rd Marine Division.

Upon leaving Camp Pendleton, Twining joined the 1st Marine Division in Korea in March 1952. For outstanding service as assistant division commander from March through May 1952, he received a Gold Star in lieu of his second Legion of Merit with Combat "V." He returned to the States that June, and subsequently served in the office of the Commandant of the Marine Corps. He was promoted to major general in September 1952. In January 1954, he was named deputy chief of staff at Headquarters Marine Corps.

General Twining returned to Korea in January 1955 as commander of the 1st Marine Division. In March of that year, he accompanied the division to Camp Pendleton, where he served until August 1956. In September 1956, he was promoted to lieutenant general and assumed duties as commandant, Marine Corps Schools, Quantico, the twenty-fifth Marine officer to head the schools. He served in that capacity until his retirement. He had retired from active duty with the Marine Corps on October 31, 1959, and died May 11, 1996, in Fallbrook, California.

== Awards and decorations ==

1st Row	Legion of Merit with Gold Star & Combat "V"		Navy Commendation Medal	Navy Presidential Unit Citation with one star
2nd Row	Marine Corps Expeditionary Medal	Yangtze Service Medal	American Defense Service Medal	Asiatic-Pacific Campaign Medal with two service stars
3rd Row	American Campaign Medal	World War II Victory Medal	National Defense Service Medal	Korean Service Medal with silver service star
4th Row	Order of Orange-Nassau with Crossed Swords	Korean Presidential Unit Citation	United Nations Korea Medal	The George Medal

General Twining also received the Faciat Georgius commemorative medal for service on Guadalcanal.

== Books authored ==
- Twining, Merrill B. (1996). No Bended Knee: The Battle for Guadalcanal. Novato, CA, USA: Presidio Press. ISBN 0-89141-826-1.
