= Nathan F. Twining =

US Air Force general (1897–1982)

Nathan Farragut Twining
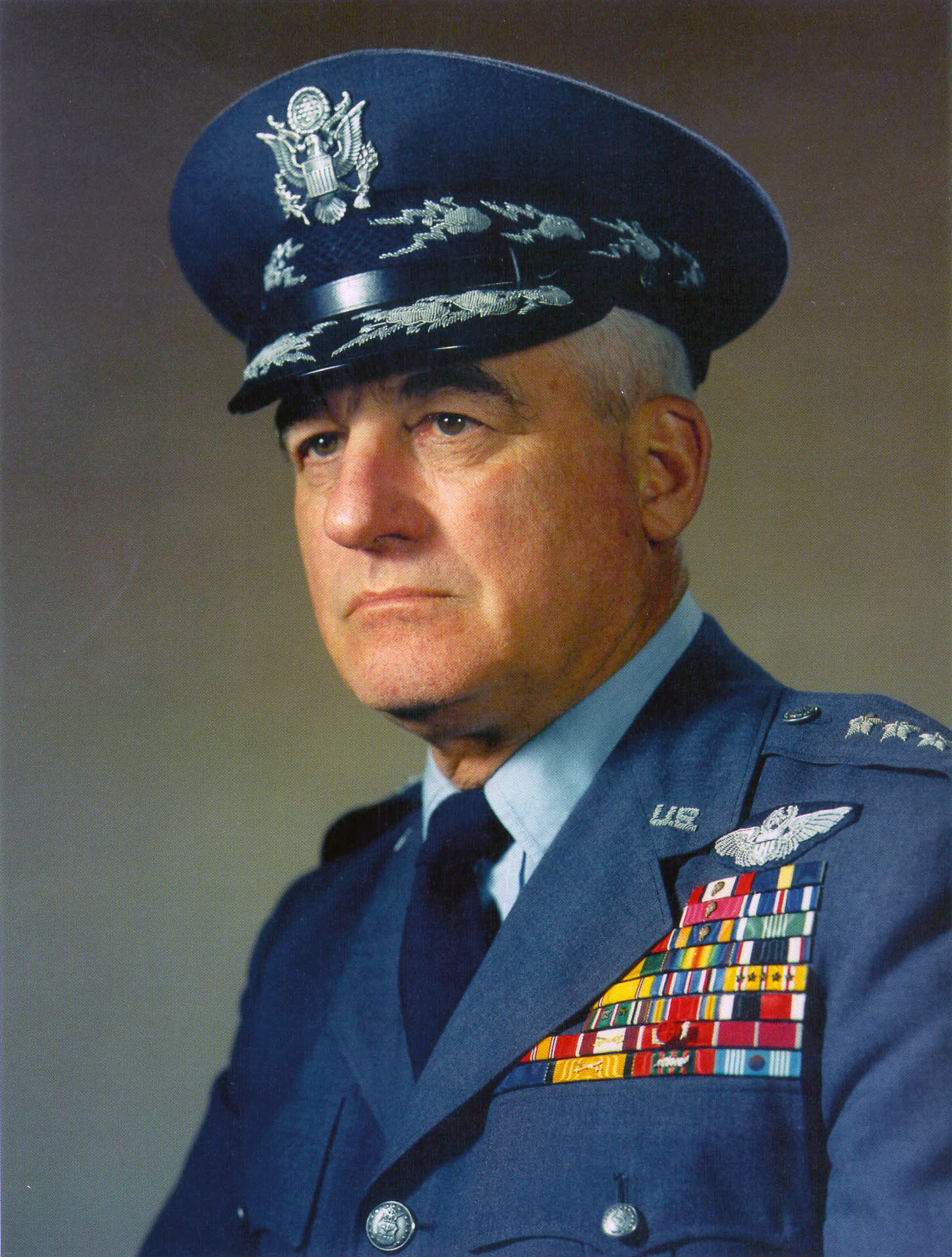
- General Nathan F. Twining, c. 1957–60
- Born: October 11, 1897; Monroe, Wisconsin, U.S.
- Died: March 29, 1982 (aged 84); Lackland Air Force Base, Texas, U.S.
- Burial place: Arlington National Cemetery
- Relatives: Merrill B. Twining (brother); Nathan C. Twining (uncle)
- Military career
- Allegiance: United States
- Branch: United States Army; United States Air Force
- Service years: 1915–1947 (Army); 1947–1960 (Air Force)
- Rank: General
- Commands: Chairman of the Joint Chiefs of Staff; Chief of Staff of the United States Air Force; Alaskan Air Command; Air Materiel Command; Twentieth Air Force; Solomons Air Command; Fifteenth Air Force; Thirteenth Air Force
- Conflicts: Border War; World War I; Occupation of the Rhineland; World War II; Guadalcanal campaign; Operation Cartwheel; Combined Bomber Offensive; Oil campaign; Korean War
- Awards: Army Distinguished Service Medal (2); Navy Distinguished Service Medal; Legion of Merit (2); Distinguished Flying Cross; Bronze Star Medal; Air Medal (2); Army Commendation Medal; Knight Commander of the Order of the British Empire (United Kingdom); Commander of the Legion of Honour (France); Commander of the National Order of Merit (France); Croix de Guerre (France); Order of the Phoenix (Greece); Order of the Partisan Star with Golden Wreath (Yugoslavia); Gold Cross of Merit with Swords (Poland); Knight Grand Cross of the Military Order of Italy; Knight Grand Cordon of the Order of the White Elephant (Thailand); Gugseon Medal of the Order of National Security Merit (South Korea); Taegeuk Cordon of the Order of Military Merit (South Korea); Aviation Cross, First Class (Peru); Medal of Merit (Egypt)

Nathan Farragut Twining (/ˈtwaɪnɪŋ/ TWY-ning; October 11, 1897 – March 29, 1982) was a United States Air Force general. He was the chief of Staff of the United States Air Force from 1953 until 1957, and the third chairman of the Joint Chiefs of Staff from 1957 to 1960. He was the first member of the Air Force to serve as Chairman. Twining was a distinguished "mustang" officer, rising from private to four-star general and appointment to the highest post in the United States Armed Forces in the course of his 45-year career.

== Early life and military career ==
Twining was the son of Clarence Walker Twining and Maize (Barber) Twining. His family had a strong military background; his brother Merrill B. Twining was a general in the United States Marine Corps, his brother Robert B. Twining attained the rank of captain in the United States Navy, and his uncle Nathan Crook Twining was a rear admiral in the Navy. Twining's stepmother, Frances Staver Twining, was the author of Bird-Watching in the West.

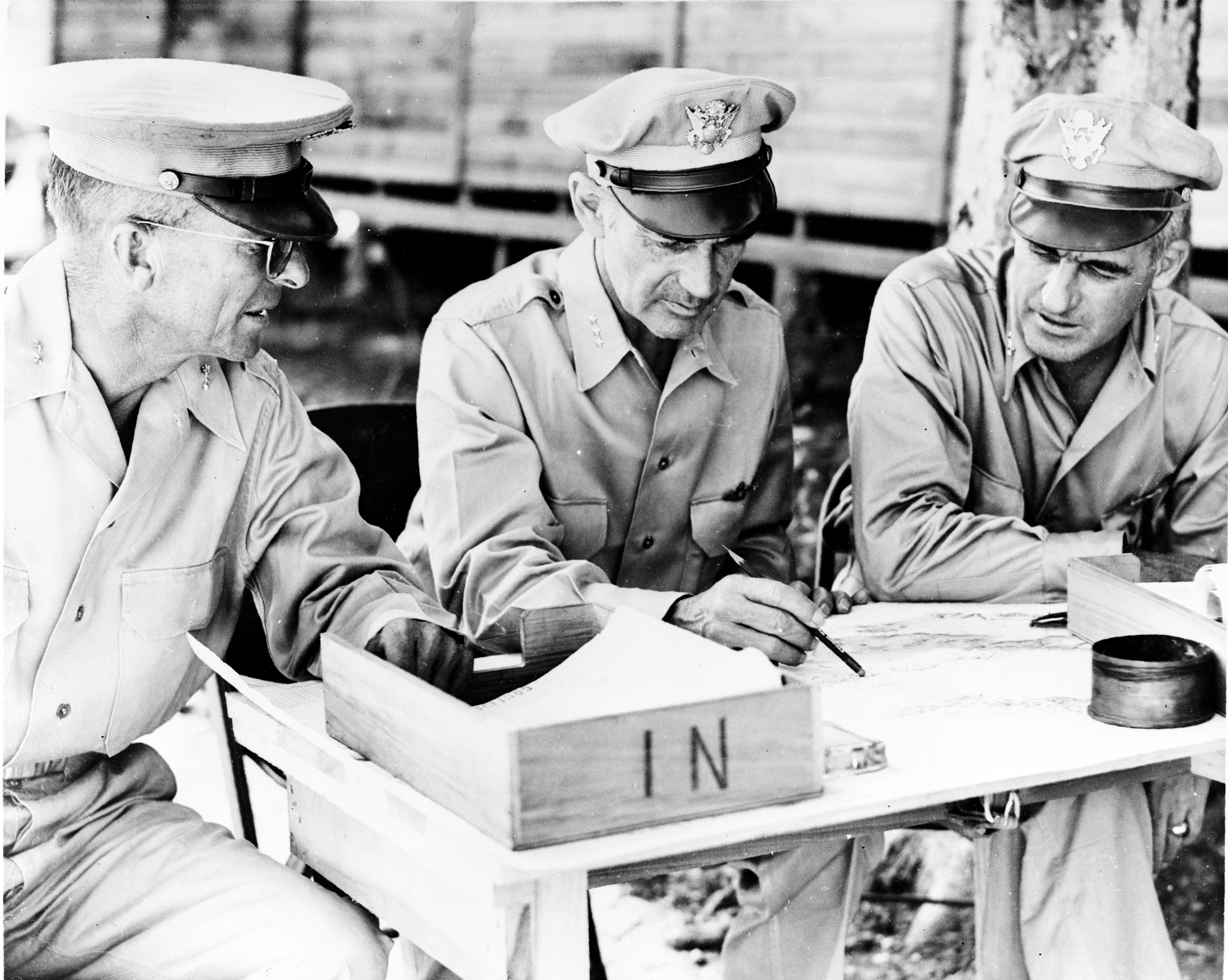
U.S. Army ground and air generals confer with their chief. From left to right: Major General Alexander Patch, Lieutenant General Millard Harmon, and Major General Nathan F. Twining, conferring over a map whilst serving in the South Pacific, February 1943.

In 1913, Twining moved with his family from Monroe, Wisconsin, to Oswego, Oregon. He was educated in Wisconsin and Oregon, and was a 1917 graduate of Portland, Oregon's Lincoln High School. He served in the Oregon National Guard from 1915 to 1917 and attained the rank of first sergeant. In 1917, he received an appointment to West Point after placing well in a competitive examination for members of the National Guard. Because the program was shortened to produce more officers for World War I, he spent only two years at the academy and graduated in 1919.

After serving in the Army infantry for three years, including post-war occupation duty in Germany, in 1922 Twining was reassigned to the Air Service. Over the next 15 years he flew fighter aircraft in Texas, Louisiana, and Hawaii, while also attending the Air Corps Tactical School and the Command and General Staff College. When World War II broke out in Europe he was assigned to the operations division on the Air Staff; then in 1942 he was sent to the South Pacific where he became chief of staff of the Allied air forces in that area.

In January 1943, he was promoted to major general and assumed command of the Thirteenth Air Force, and that same November he traveled across the world to take over the Fifteenth Air Force from Jimmy Doolittle. On February 1, 1943, the U.S. Navy rescued Maj. Gen. Twining, the 13th Air Force Commander, and 14 others near the New Hebrides. They had ditched their plane on the way from Guadalcanal to Espiritu Santo and spent six days in life rafts. After arriving in Europe, he commanded the Fifteenth Air Force as well as the Mediterranean Allied Strategic Air Force of the Mediterranean Allied Air Forces during the Combined Bomber Offensive and Oil campaign against the Axis. When Germany surrendered, Arnold sent Twining back to the Pacific to command the B-29s of the Twentieth Air Force in the last push against Japan, however he was in this command only a short time when the atomic strikes ended the war. On October 20, 1945, Twining led three B-29s in developing a new route from Guam to Washington via India and Germany. They completed the 13,167-mile-trip in 59 hours, 30 minutes. He returned to the States where he was named commander of the Air Materiel Command, and in 1947 he took over Alaskan Air Command.

On September 23, 1947, Lieutenant General Twining issued a memo to Brigadier General George F. Schulgen of the Army Air Forces. The subject line of the memo read “AMC Opinion Concerning 'Flying Discs.'” The general tone of the memo was that unidentified objects seen in the skies by military personnel were not weather, astronomical or other phenomenon but rather objects that warranted further investigation. Twining wrote “The phenomenon reported is something real and not visionary or fictitious.”

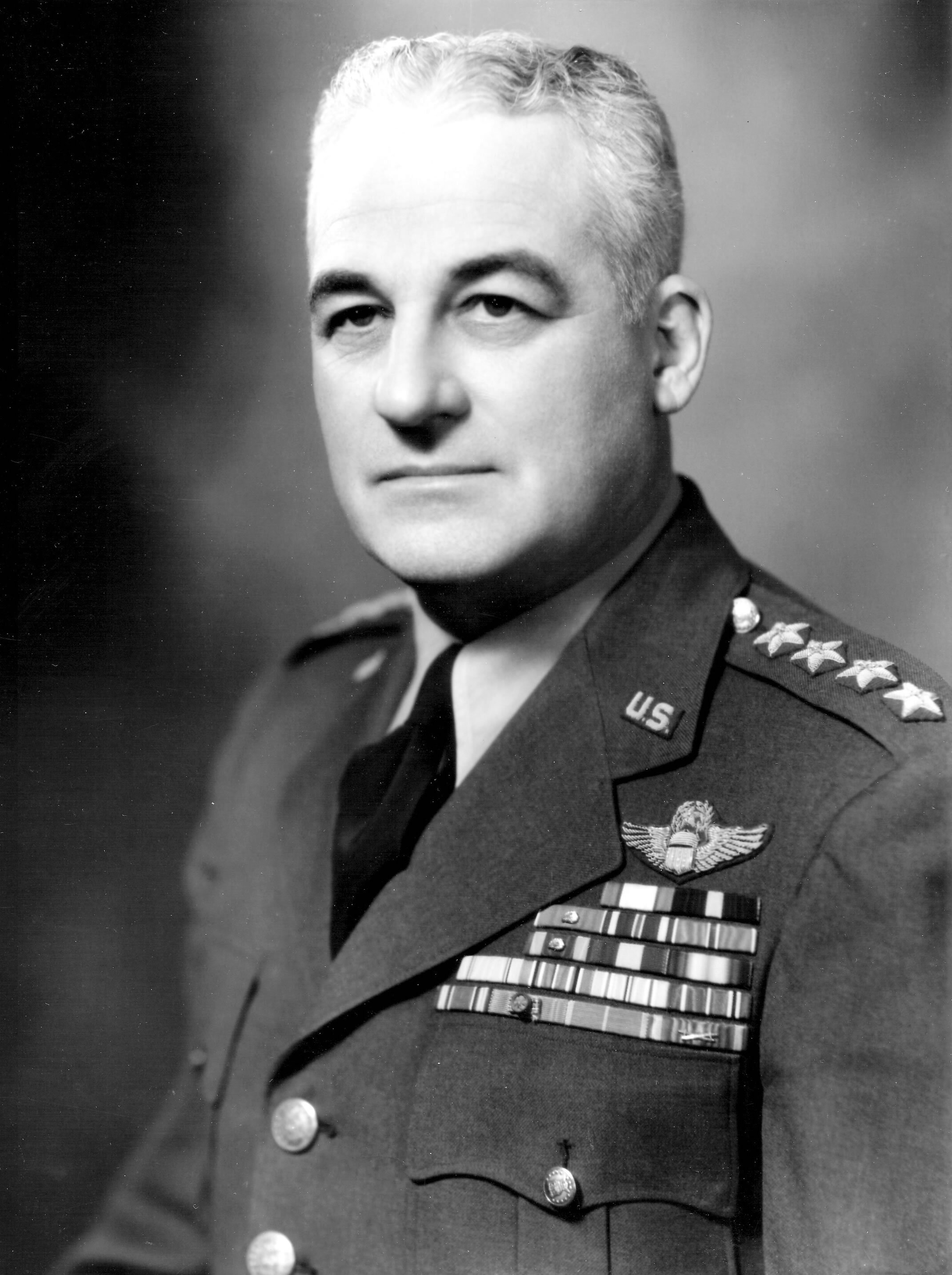
General Nathan F. Twining

After three years there Twining was set to retire as a lieutenant general, but when Muir Fairchild, the Vice Chief of Staff of the United States Air Force, died unexpectedly of a heart attack, Twining was elevated to full general and named his successor.

== United States Air Force Chief of Staff ==
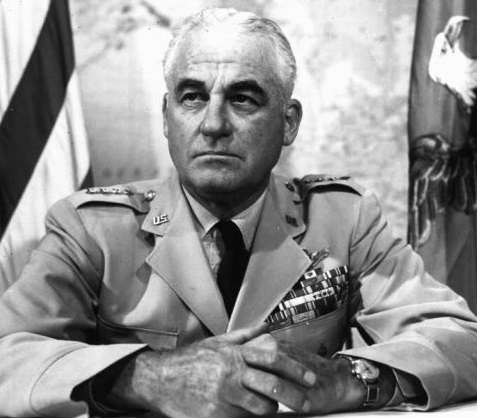
General Nathan F. Twining in 1957

When General Hoyt Vandenberg retired in mid-1953, Twining was selected as Chief of Staff of the United States Air Force; during his tenure, massive retaliation based on airpower became the national strategy. During his tenure as Air Force Chief of Staff Twining oversaw massive buildup within the United States Air Force, including the entrance of several jet-fleet aircraft within the Air Force such as the Boeing B-52 Stratofortress, Boeing KC-135 Stratotanker and F-100 Super Sabre. Twining also directed the development of missiles system within the Air Force. For his role and achievement in developing the Air Force, Twining was credited for leading the U.S. Air Force into a modern-day Air Force with far more sophisticated equipment rather than the old equipment that the Air Force used during the World War II and during the early years of the Air Force following the Air Force receiving its own autonomy in 1947.

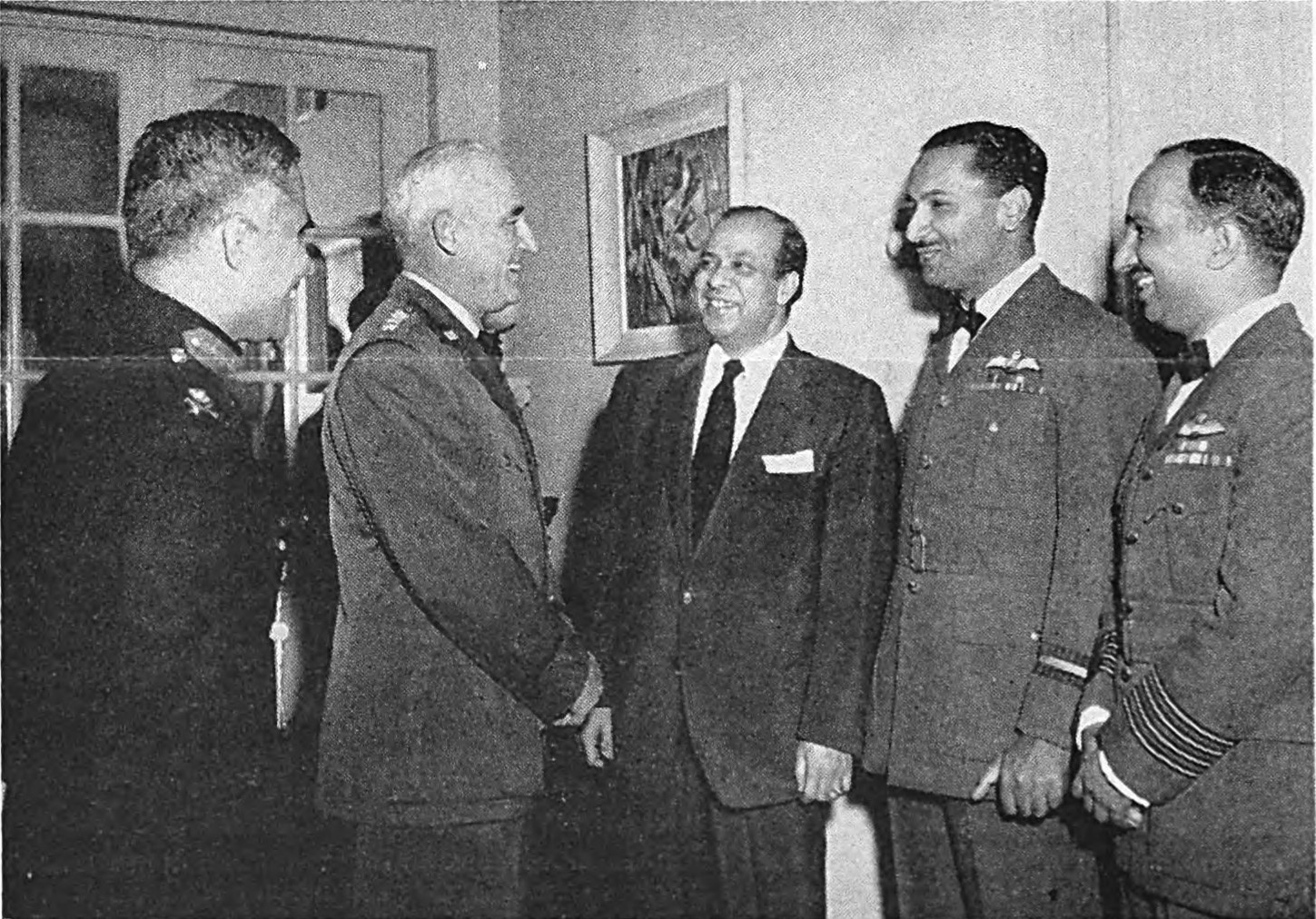
From left: Maj Gen Mian Hayaud Din, General Twining, Ambassador Bogra, Air Cdre Asghar Khan, and Gp Capt Akhtar. Pictured at a reception held in Khan's honor in Washington, D.C., after the announcement of his appointment as Chief of the Pakistan Air Force, c. Spring 1957

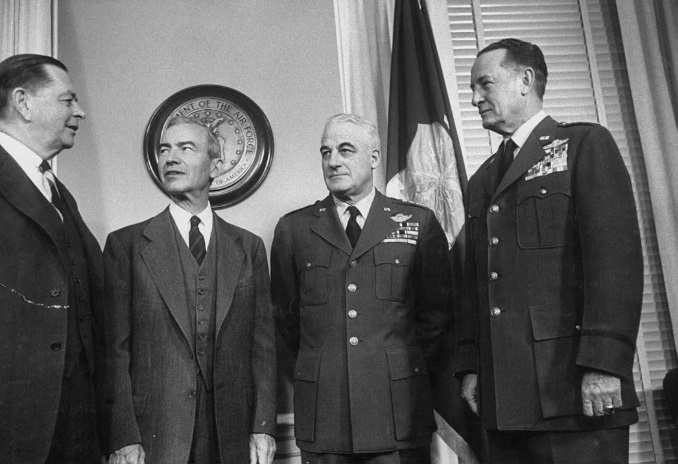
Twining with Air Force Chief of Staff General Thomas D. White, Secretary of the Air Force James H. Douglas Jr. and Deputy Secretary of Defense Donald A. Quarles at The Pentagon 1957

General Twining was also an ardent advocate of the Strategic Air Command and strongly believed that Strategic Air Command was the best deterrent to Communist military power. As a result, several of new Strategic Air Command bases including the Strategic Air Command underground command center in Strategic Air Command Headquarters was built during General Twining's tenure as Air Force Chief of Staff.

As Air Force Chief of Staff General Twining also achieved the reputation for appeasing the acrimonious controversies which characterized the interservice rivalry during the immediate postwar years and played major role in easing the interservice rivalry. The interservice rivalry had emerged following the end of World War II and the establishment of National Security Act of 1947. One of interservice rivalry major conflict was the "Revolt of the Admirals" in 1949, on which the Truman administration canceled the building of supercarrier USS United States (CVA-58) due to Truman Administration and the Department of Defense more preferred the strategic bomber aircraft Convair B-36 Peacemaker, causing several high-ranking Navy officials to protest against the Truman administration decision to canceled the supercarrier project.

In 1956, Twining was chosen by Eisenhower to head a delegation of senior officers to visit Soviet Union, the first such exchange since World War II. He was shown by Zhukov at an air force base with Badger and Bison bombers flying overhead.

== Chairman of the Joint Chiefs of Staff ==
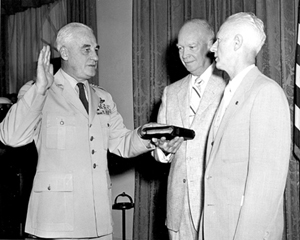
General Nathan F. Twining is sworn in as Chairman of the Joint Chiefs of Staff by Deputy Secretary of Defense Donald A. Quarles on a Bible held by President Dwight D. Eisenhower, at The White House, August 15, 1957.

In 1957, President Eisenhower appointed Twining Chairman of the Joint Chiefs of Staff. During his term as chairman, Twining oversaw the early stage of the Space Race and boost the space program due to the Soviet that launch an intercontinental ballistic missile on August 25, 1957, and less than two months later successfully launch "Sputnik" in orbit. Twining also supported President Eisenhower New Look policy that turns the military capability from conventional military capability into a modern military capability by pushing the research and development for science and technology especially on the weapons program. The policy was to deter the threat from the Soviet and their Eastern Bloc allies and eventually preventing them to win the Arms race. One of Twining's major achievement as Chairman of The Joint Chiefs of Staff was the launch of The United States first liquid-fueled Intercontinental ballistic missile (ICBM), the Titan and Atlas Missile in 1959. Twining was also credited for established the growth of The Strategic Air Command or SAC as The United States primary Nuclear deterrence against the massive retaliation, as a result Strategic Air Command's strength increased multiple times rather than when Strategic Air Command was first established in 1946. In 1958 when the Iraqi's insurgent managed to topple the Iraqi's monarchy government causing the neighboring Lebanon to be concerned that the uprising might spread within the Lebanon area. Those eventually leading General Twining to convince President Eisenhower to deploy troops to Lebanon in order to secure the government of President Camille Chamoun of Lebanon from the incoming uprising. General Twining also played major role during the Second Taiwan Strait Crisis when The People's Republic of China forces (PRC) attacked the Taiwan Territory island of Quemoy and Matsu. Worried that the island of Taiwan might lose into the PRC's communist, General Twining and the rest of the Joint Chiefs member recommended to President Eisenhower to use whatever force necessary in order to protect the Island of Taiwan from the PRC's forces. This resulted in the deployment of United States Seventh Fleet and another two carriers from the Mediterranean including USS Lexington and USS Marshall to the Formosa strait. Several of the U.S. Air Force fighter aircraft also deployed to Taiwan. Those eventually the show of force along with some political initiatives did worked and the crisis passed after the bombardment ceased. During the Berlin Crisis in November 1958 General Twining convinced President Eisenhower that the Soviet threat is imminent and eventually could caused major crisis and told the president that the armed forces have to standby in cased some major crisis erupted. Some other service chief are considering for major mobilization forces along with the Western Allies. However General Twining saw that it was not necessary for that and The Soviet finally withdrew from its deadline in May 1959.

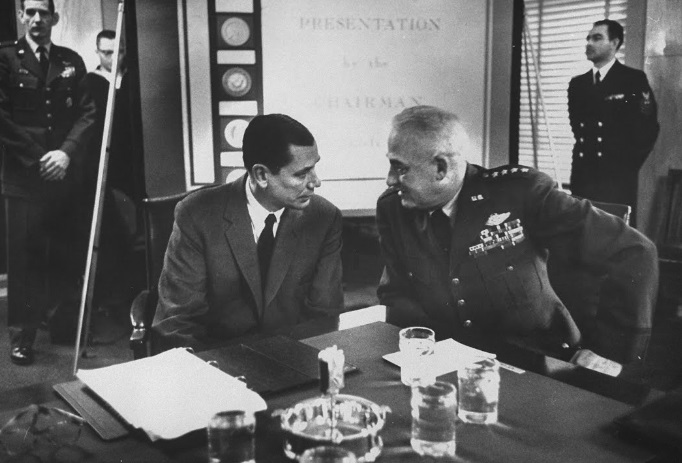
Chairman of the Joint Chiefs of Staff General Nathan F. Twining with Secretary of Defense Thomas S. Gates Jr. during Senate Armed Services Committee hearing at Capitol Hill 1960

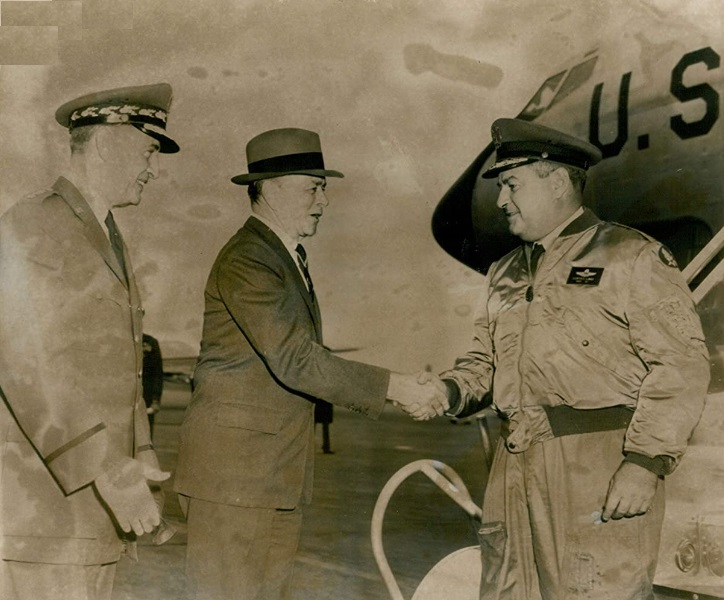
Chairman of The Joint Chiefs of Staff General Nathan F. Twining with Secretary of the Air Force James H. Douglas Jr. greet Air Force Vice Chief of Staff General Curtis LeMay at the Washington National Airport in November 1957.

During his tenure as Chairman of the Joint Chiefs of Staff, Twining also played central role in working out a new procedures to coordinate a nuclear strike plans in order to prevent the first-strike and strength the United States deterrence against the United States enemy, especially those who own Nuclear Weapons. This resulted in the development of land-based missiles and Polaris Submarines missile in order to complement the submarine-launched ballistic missiles as part of the Nuclear Triad. Together with Secretary of Defense Thomas S. Gates Jr., Twining coordinated the creation of the Joint Strategic Planning Staff and also the Single Integrated Operational Plan. These two functions plan played major role during the Cold War and eventually still play major role even after the end of the Cold War.

Twining was re-appointed as Chairman of the Joint Chiefs of Staff for the second term in 1959. However, due to his deteriorating health condition following major surgery, Twining chose to take early retirement from active-duty on September 30, 1960.

Following his retirement from active duty Twining worked as vice chairman for the publishing firm Holt, Rinehart, and Winston. In 1965, Twining was named ninth annual recipient of the General William E. Mitchell Memorial Award.

General Nathan F. Twining died on March 29, 1982, at Lackland Air Force Base in Texas and was buried in Arlington National Cemetery.

== Dates of rank ==
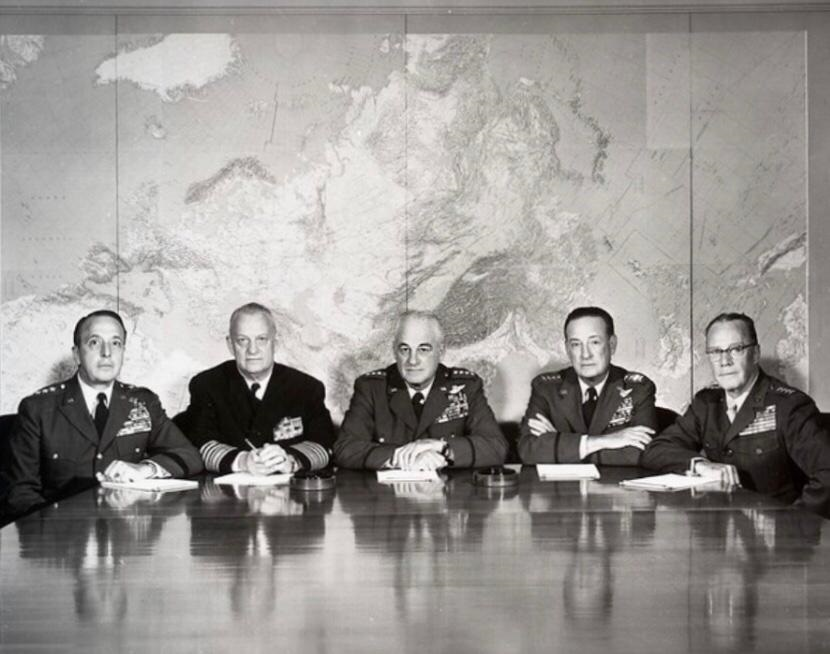
Chairman of the Joint Chiefs of Staff General Nathan F. Twining with the other members of the Joint Chiefs of Staff at The Pentagon on January 15, 1959

Insignia	Rank	Component	Date
None	Private	Oregon National Guard	1915
	Corporal	Oregon National Guard	June 19, 1916
	Sergeant	Oregon National Guard	March 25, 1917
	First sergeant	Oregon National Guard	1917
None	Cadet	United States Military Academy	June 14, 1917
No pin insignia at the time	Second lieutenant	National Army	November 1, 1918
	First lieutenant	National Army	January 1, 1920
	Second lieutenant	Regular Army	December 15, 1922
	First lieutenant	Regular Army	November 20, 1923
	First lieutenant	Regular Army (United States Army Air Service)	November 16, 1926 (transferred)
	Captain	Regular Army (United States Army Air Corps)	April 20, 1935 (temporary); August 1, 1935 (permanent)
	Major	Regular Army (United States Army Air Corps)	September 1 (accepted September 7) 1938 (temporary); July 1, 1940 (permanent)
	Lieutenant colonel	Army of the United States	September 15 (accepted September 22) 1941
	Colonel	Army of the United States	February 1, 1942
	Brigadier general	Army of the United States	June 17, 1942
	Lieutenant colonel	Regular Army (United States Army Air Forces)	July 15 (accepted July 22) 1941 (temporary); December 11, 1942 (permanent)
	Major general	Army of the United States	February 5, 1943
	Lieutenant general	Army of the United States	June 5, 1945
	Brigadier general	Regular Army (United States Army Air Forces)	July 18, 1946
	Major general	United States Air Force	February 19, 1948
	General	United States Air Force	October 10, 1950 (temporary); June 30, 1953 (permanent)

== Awards and decorations ==
General Twining held the ratings of Command Pilot and Aircraft Observer. In addition, General Twining was awarded numerous personal decorations from the U.S. military and foreign countries.

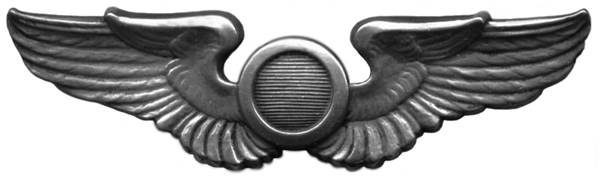
US Army Air Forces Command Pilot Badge
US Army Air Forces Aircraft Observer Badge

Army Distinguished Service Medal with bronze oak leaf cluster
Navy Distinguished Service Medal
Legion of Merit with bronze oak leaf cluster
Distinguished Flying Cross
Bronze Star Medal
Air Medal with bronze oak leaf cluster
Army Commendation Medal
Mexican Border Service Medal
World War I Victory Medal
Army of Occupation of Germany Medal
American Defense Service Medal
American Campaign Medal
Asiatic-Pacific Campaign Medal with silver and four bronze service stars
European-African-Middle Eastern Campaign Medal with silver and bronze service stars
World War II Victory Medal
Army of Occupation Medal
National Defense Service Medal
Knight Commander of the Order of the British Empire (United Kingdom)
French Legion of Honour, Commandeur
French National Order of Merit, Commandeur
French Legion of Honour, Chevalier
Greek Order of the Phoenix, Silver Cross with Swords
Yugoslav Order of the Partisan Star with Golden Wreath (I rank)
Polish Gold Cross of Merit with Swords
Military Order of Italy, Knight Grand Cross
Order of the White Elephant, Knight Grand Cordon
South Korean Order of National Security Merit, Gugseon Medal
South Korean Order of Military Merit, Taeguk Cordon
Egyptian Order of Merit, Grand Cross
French Croix de Guerre with silver palm
Aviation Cross (First Class), Republic of Peru

=== Honors ===
National Aviation Hall of Fame (1996)
A city park in Monroe, Wisconsin, Twining's birthplace, and an elementary school on the Air Force base in Grand Forks, North Dakota, are named after him.
An extensive amateur astronomy observatory facility located in rural central New Mexico is named after him.

Military offices
Preceded by Muir S. Fairchild	Vice Chief of Staff of the United States Air Force; 1950–1953	Succeeded by Thomas D. White
Preceded by Hoyt Vandenberg	Chief of Staff of the United States Air Force; 1953–1957	Succeeded by Thomas D. White
Preceded by Arthur W. Radford	Chairman of the Joint Chiefs of Staff; 1957–1960	Succeeded by Lyman Lemnitzer
