= Shiono =

Shiono (written: 塩野 lit. "salt field") is a Japanese surname. Notable people with the surname include:

- Akihisa Shiono (塩野 瑛久; born 1995), Japanese actor and model
- Anri Shiono (塩野 アンリ), Japanese former voice actress
- Etorouji Shiono (塩野干支郎次; born 1976), Japanese manga artist
- Hiroshi Shiono (塩野 宏; 1931–2026), Japanese legal scholar
- Nanami Shiono (塩野 七生; born 1937), Japanese writer
- Shizue Shiono (塩野 静枝; 1903–1962), Japanese actress
- Suehiko Shiono (塩野 季彦; 1880–1949), Japanese lawyer and politician
