= Faciat Georgius =

Faciat Georgius (Let George Do It)
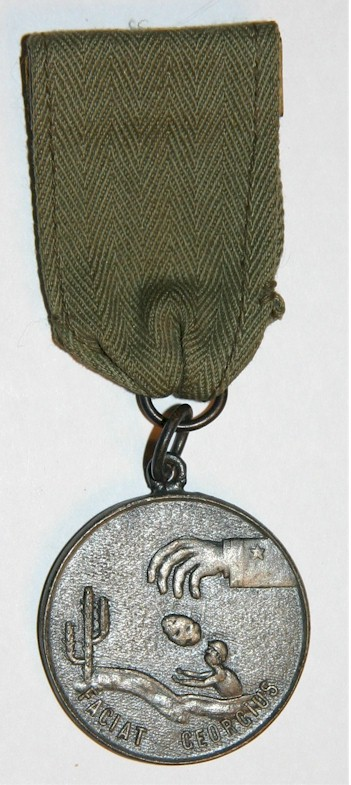
- Obverse of the Faciat Georgius
- Type: Commemorative (Unofficial) Medal
- Presented by: 1st Marine Division (United States)
- Status: Unofficial
- First award: 1943
- Final award: 1943

Highlights
- Total: About 50
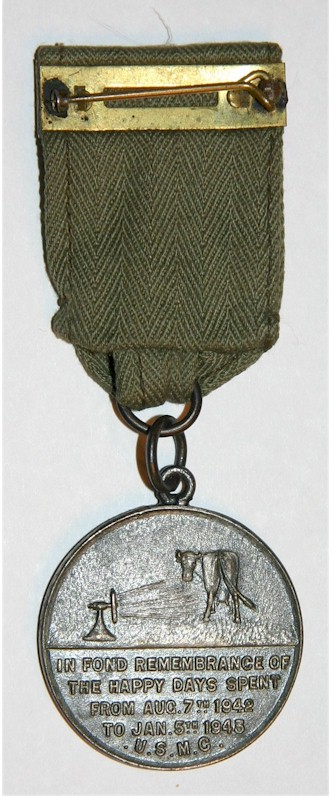
- Reverse of the Faciat Georgius

The Faciat Georgius (“Let George Do It” in English) is an unofficial medal given during World War II to United States Marine Corps (USMC) officers, senior NCOs of the 1st Marine Division and a British coastwatcher who served during the Guadalcanal campaign.

== History ==
After the initial success of the landings on Guadalcanal on 7 August 1942 by the Marines of the 1st Marine Division, the Imperial Japanese forces rallied. On D+3, Japanese naval and air forces dealt the U.S. Navy a defeat at the battle of Savo Island. On 10 August, the Navy withdrew the ships that were supporting the Marines, having unloaded only half their supplies. Several weeks would pass before the ships and supplies returned, leaving the Marines on their own, subsisting on their meager supplies and captured enemy rations.

After the campaign, as the division was resting and refitting in Melbourne, Australia, Colonel (later Major General) Merrill B. Twining suggested that a commemorative medal be struck. He suggested that the ribbon be made of worn olive drab cotton twill fabric of the USMC M1941 utility uniform and bear the inscription “Let George Do It”—the division's informal motto from its training days, when its personnel seemed to draw more than their fair share of onerous assignments. The motto was translated into Latin by British coastwatcher Captain Martin Clemens, who was also awarded the medal. The artist was Captain (later Colonel) Donald L. Dickson, who drew the designs on captured Japanese postcards using a half dollar to draw the circles. The cost to receive a medal was one Australian pound. About 45 officers and senior enlisted men signed up to receive a medal.

All that can be documented is that the medals were made in Australia, using the lost-wax casting process because creating a metal die would have been too expensive. Estimates of the number of medals cast range anywhere from 25 to several hundred; about 50 is the commonly agreed-upon number. Instead of a brooch, the medal was awarded with an oversized safety pin used for closing Navy shipboard laundry bags or other interesting device. A certificate was issued with each medal.

When the medals were ready, Lieutenant Frank Farrell, the 7th Marines' intelligence officer and former feature editor of the New York World-Telegram, was assigned to write the text and handle the printing of the certificates. Second Lieutenant John C. Schiller Jr. was charged with collecting the fee and Lt. Col. (later Col.) Edmond J. Buckley was appointed "Grand Master of the Order" and signed several of the certificates.

In recent years, fakes have been cast and can be identified by a different metal, different patina and a lack of detail, especially in the fingers on the obverse.

== Legend ==
Various accounts also state that the ribbon, to be "official", had to be made from uniform fabric washed in the Lunga River of Guadalcanal.

== Certificate and design drawing ==
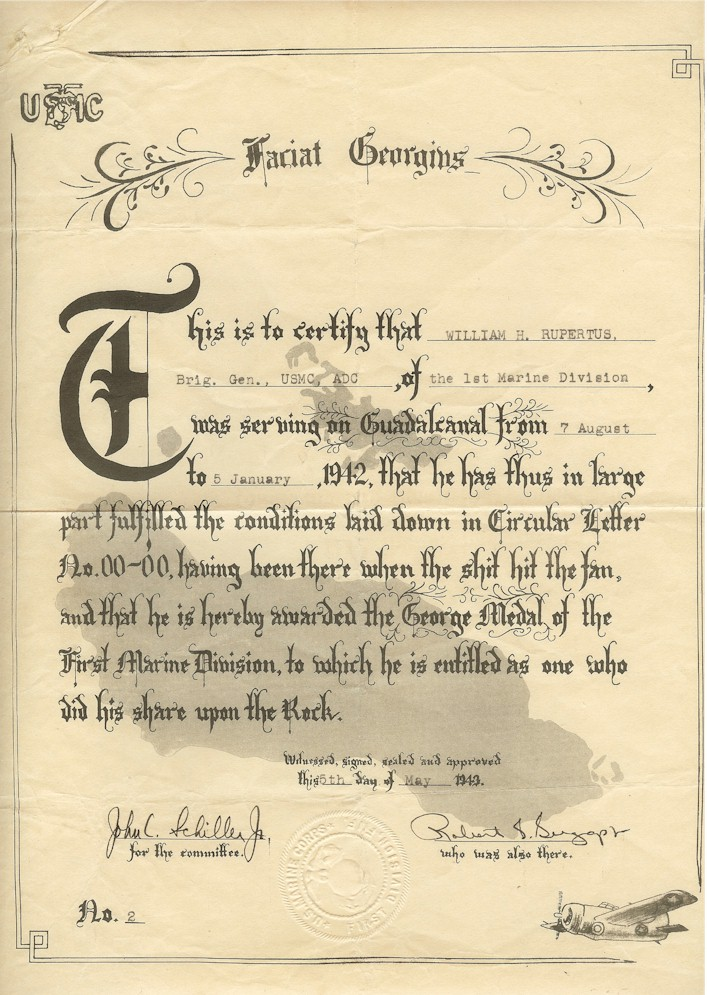
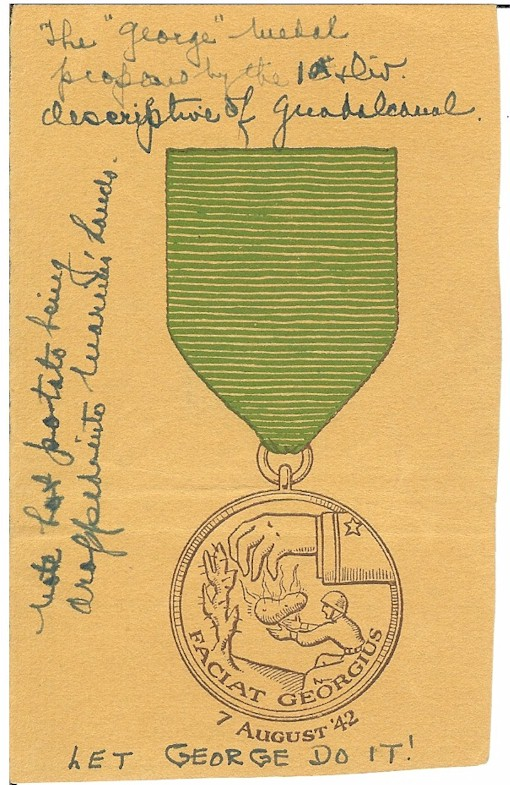

== Description and symbolism ==
Obverse

A hand extending from a U.S. Navy uniform sleeve dropping a hot potato to an entrenched Marine. A saguaro cactus symbolizes the code name of the landings ("Operation Cactus.")

The inscription at the bottom reads:

FACIAT GEORGIUS

Reverse

The rear end of a cow with an electric fan blowing across it, symbolizing the times "when the s*** hit the fan."

The inscription at the bottom reads:

IN FOND REMEMBRANCE OF

THE HAPPY DAYS SPENT

FROM AUG. 7th 1942

TO JAN. 5th 1943

U.S.M.C.

Ribbon

The ribbon is made of washed olive drab cotton twill fabric from the USMC M1941 utility uniform.

== Notable recipients ==
- Martin Clemens
- William H. Rupertus
- Merrill B. Twining
- Merritt A. Edson
