= Nathan Crook Twining =

American admiral (1869–1924)

Nathan Crook Twining Jr.
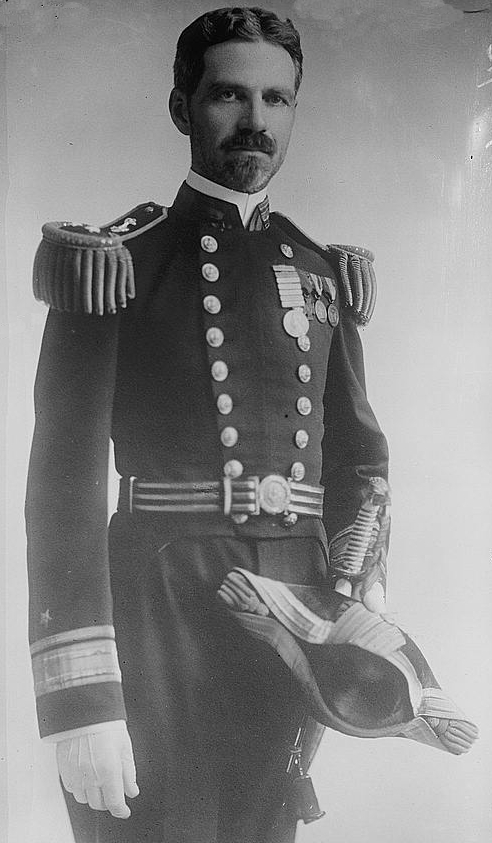
- Born: January 17, 1869; Boscobel, Wisconsin, US
- Died: July 4, 1924 (aged 55); Nantucket, Massachusetts, US
- Burial place: Arlington National Cemetery
- Relatives: Merrill B. Twining & Nathan Farragut Twining (nephews)
- Military career
- Allegiance: United States of America
- Branch: United States Navy
- Service years: 1885–1923
- Rank: Rear Admiral
- Commands: Tacoma
- Conflicts: Spanish–American War; Occupation of Veracruz; World War I

Nathan Crook Twining (17 January 1869 – 4 July 1924) was a rear admiral of the United States Navy.

== Biography ==
Twining was born in Boscobel, Wisconsin, on 17 January 1869, the son of Nathan Crook Twining Sr. (1834–1924) and his second wife, Mary Jane Rennie. He was raised, in part, by his father's third wife, Margaret E. "Maggie" Rockwell (1849–1919) of Batavia, Kane County, Illinois.

He was appointed a naval cadet in 1885 and graduated from the United States Naval Academy on 7 June 1889. During the Spanish–American War, he served in Iowa (BB-4) in Cuban waters and later was executive officer of Kearsarge (BB-5) when that ship circumnavigated the globe with the Great White Fleet.

As the capability of aircraft to bombard warships was grower ever more likely, in 1911 Twining developed the U.S. Navy's first anti-aircraft cannon. The prototype was a 1-pounder. It was not placed in production, but provided the conceptual basis for the upscale 3 inch anti-aircraft cannon mounted on most U.S. warships during World War I.

In 1911 he succeeded his father as an hereditary member of the Delaware Society of the Cincinnati.

He commanded Tacoma (C-18) during the bombardment of Veracruz, Mexico in 1914.

During World War I, he served as Chief of Staff for Admiral William Sims, Commander of Naval Forces in European waters. He was also a member of the Allied War Council.

Rear Admiral Twining retired early in 1923 due to ill health. He died on July 4, 1924, in Nantucket, Massachusetts.

== Family ==
Twining was the uncle of United States Air Force General Nathan F. Twining, and United States Marine Corps General Merrill B. Twining. Rear Adm. Twining was married to Caroline Twining. Caroline died on October 14, 1943, and is buried next to her husband at Arlington National Cemetery.

== Honors ==
In 1943, the destroyer USS Twining (DD-540) was named in his honor.

== Awards ==
- Navy Distinguished Service Medal
- Specially Meritorious Service Medal
- Sampson Medal
- Spanish Campaign Medal
- Mexican Service Medal
- Victory Medal
