= Government in exile of the Commonwealth of the Philippines =

Government-in-exile during World War II

Government of the Commonwealth of the Philippines in exile Gobierno de la Mancomunidad de Filipinas en el exilio (Spanish) Pámahalaáng Kómonwélt ng Pilipinas sa pagpapatapón (Tagalog)
- 1942–1945
- Flag of the United States War flag of the Commonwealth of the Philippines Flags (1935–1946) Coat of arms
- Anthem: "The Philippine Hymn"
- Status: Government-in-Exile of an unincorporated and organized U.S. commonwealth
- Capital-in-exile: Melbourne (1942); Washington, D.C. (1942–1944); Tacloban (1944–1945)
- Common languages: English; Spanish; Tagalog; Philippine languages
- President
  - 1942–1944: Manuel L. Quezon
  - 1944–1945: Sergio Osmeña
- High Commissioner
  - 1942–1945 (acting): Harold L. Ickes
- Vice President
  - 1942–1944: Sergio Osmeña
  - 1944–1945: Vacant
- Historical era: World War II
  - Japanese invasion: 8 December 1941
  - Japanese occupation: 3 January 1942
  - Government evacuation: 12 March 1942
  - Return to the Philippines: 20 October 1944
  - Restoration: 27 February 1945
  - Surrender of Japan: 15 August 1945

The Government of the Commonwealth of the Philippines in exile (Spanish: Gobierno de la Mancomunidad de Filipinas en el exilio; Tagalog: Pámahalaáng Kómonwélt ng Pilipinas sa pagpapatapón) was a continuation of the government of the Commonwealth of the Philippines after they had been evacuated from the country during World War II. The Commonwealth of the Philippines was self-governing, although under the ultimate control of the United States.

During the conquest of the Philippines by the Empire of Japan, the government evacuated to Australia following the prior evacuation of U.S. General Douglas MacArthur in March 1942. From Australia they traveled to the United States, where they established themselves in Washington, D.C., on 13 May 1942. While in Washington, the government, led by President Manuel L. Quezon, worked to maintain American interest in the Philippines, and issued shortwave broadcasts to the Philippines. Their legitimacy was supported by the U.S. government led by Franklin D. Roosevelt, and Quezon joined the inter-governmental Pacific War Council. While in exile, Quezon signed the Declaration by United Nations.

While the government had been granted emergency powers by the Philippine Legislature shortly after the invasion, the term of President Quezon was constitutionally limited to end in November 1943. Shortly before this date, the U.S. Congress passed a resolution extending the term until "constitutional processes and normal functions of government shall have been restored to the Philippine Islands." Quezon died in August 1944, and Vice President Sergio Osmeña was sworn in at Washington, D.C. The government returned to the Philippines later that year as part of the American liberation of the islands.

== Background ==
On the morning of December 8, 1941, the Japanese invaded the Philippines. The invasion began with landings at Batan Island, about 125 miles north of Luzon island, and followed the bombing of the U.S. base at Pearl Harbor a few hours earlier. President Manuel L. Quezon was in Baguio recuperating from a recurrence of an old illness, and immediately traveled by road the 160 miles to Manila to take charge of the Filipino resistance. In meetings following his arrival, U.S. General MacArthur informed him that he would be transferring his headquarters to Corregidor island, and requested the President to join him. President Quezon initially objected, but agreed when his Cabinet endorsed MacArthur's suggestion by unanimous decision. On December 24, the President relocated there, accompanied by his family, Vice President Osmeña, Chief Justice Santos, Major General Basilio Valdes, who had been designated Secretary of National Defense, and some members of the Executive Staff. President Quezon and Vice President Osmeña began their second term on Corregidor on Rizal Day, December 30, 1941.

As invading Japanese forces advanced, all United States Army Forces in the Far East (USAFFE) military personnel were removed from the major urban areas. Manila was officially declared an open city on December 26. By then, USAFFE forces had withdrawn to the Bataan peninsula and were under siege there. By the middle of February the lack of food on Corregidor had become acute, and it was decided that the President could be of more help by going to the unoccupied provinces to organize some plan of bringing in food for the soldiers at Bataan and Corregidor and to keep up the morale of the civilian population.

== The Emergency Powers Act ==
On December 16, 1941, President Quezon approved Commonwealth Act No. 671, which had been passed by the Philippine Legislature. This act declared a state of total emergency and invested the President with extraordinary powers in order to meet the emergency. Generally, the act authorized the President, during the existence of the emergency, to promulgate such rules and regulations as he may deem necessary to carry out the national policy. These powers included authority to transfer the seat of the Government or component parts of the government.

== Evacuation from Corregidor ==
At dusk on February 20, the American submarine USS Swordfish (SS-193) slipped through mine fields, was boarded by President Quezon and his party, and transported them to Iloilo, which had not yet been occupied by Japanese forces. The following night, they boarded the ship Princess of Negros, which transported them to Dumaguete. General MacArthur and his party, meanwhile, had been evacuated from Corregidor by PT boat to Cagayan de Oro on Mindanao (see Douglas MacArthur's escape from the Philippines).

== Evacuation from the Philippines ==
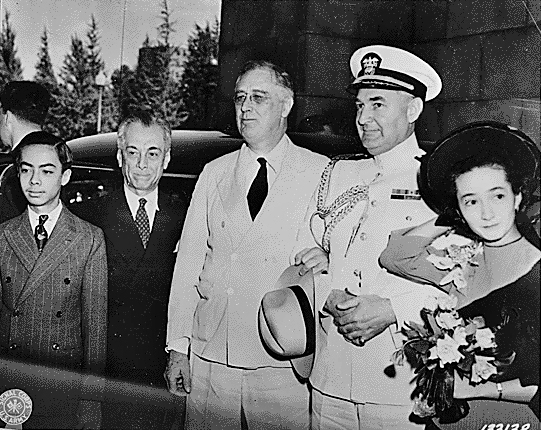
Manuel L. Quezon visiting Franklin D. Roosevelt in Washington, D.C., while in exile

MacArthur had sent some of the boats which had evacuated his party back to the southern tip of Negros Island to pick up President Quezon's party. Major Soriano, President Quezon's aide, met boat PT-41 and redirected it to Dumaguete, where it embarked President Quezon's party and transported them to Oroquieta in what was then the province of Misamis. From there, they traveled to the Del Monte plantation in Mindanao, where they remained overnight and were picked up the following day at Del Monte Airfield by two B-17 aircraft that transported them to Batchelor Airfield, 40 miles from Darwin in Northern Australia There, they transferred to Douglas DC-5 aircraft for transport to Alice Springs. There, they were reunited with the party of Vice President Osmeña that had been transported in a separate aircraft. The parties flew together to Adelaide, spent the night there, and took an overnight train to Melbourne.

President Quezon felt that he should be in Washington. The U.S. government agreed and, in the spring of 1942, the SS President Coolidge, which had been pressed into service to evacuate U.S. citizens from parts of Asia after the Japanese attacks and converted into a troopship, transported Quezon and his party to the U.S. escorted by the cruiser USS St. Louis, departing Melbourne on April 20 and arriving in San Francisco on May 8.

Quezon and party were met in San Francisco, and military aides were assigned to escort the party on a special train which had been assigned to transport them to Washington D.C. The train arrived in Washington on May 13, and was met by President Franklin D. Roosevelt along with his wife, Eleanor and members of his Cabinet. Quezon and his family were transported by motorcade to the White House. They spent the night at the White House and were guests of honor the following day at a luncheon hosted by the Roosevelts to formally welcome the exiled Philippine Government to the United States, underscoring its legitimacy.

== The government in exile ==
In the U.S., members of President Quezon's war cabinet were heavily involved in civic and social activities such as endorsing the sale of war bonds, participating in parades with heroic themes, involvement with commemoration and celebration of Philippine historic events such as Rizal Day. These activities were very successful in sustaining American interest in the Philippine Commonwealth, and had immense impact on the Japanese-occupied Philippines through shortwave news broadcasts which the Japanese were unable to stop. The government in exile also published a news magazine in the United States called Philippines. President Quezon was invited by President Roosevelt to join the Pacific War Council, and was asked to sign the United Nations Pact for the Philippines; in doing so, Quezon became a signatory of the Atlantic Charter. Representing the Philippine Government, on June 14, 1942, President Quezon signed the Declaration by United Nations of January 1, 1942, joining with the group of nations pledged as being "engaged in a common struggle against save and brutal forces seeking to subjugate the world," making the Philippines one of nine governments-in-exile to do so.

The United States government considered issues relating to the Philippines to be internal affairs due to their claim to sovereignty over the islands. Due to Japanese plans to establish an independent Philippine state, the United States considered recognizing the Philippines under the exiled Government as an independent country, including with an exchange of ambassadors. While this was decided against, Roosevelt declared that they would treat the Quezon government "as having the same status as the governments of other independent nations."

President Quezon had been elected to a six-year term as the second President of the Philippines and the first President of the Philippine Commonwealth, taking office on November 15, 1935. In 1940, The 1935 Constitution was amended by the National Assembly to change the legislature from a unicameral assembly to a bicameral congress and to change the term of office of the President from six years with no reelection to four years with a possibility of being reelected for a second term. The amended constitution contained a provision saying, "No person shall serve as President for more than eight consecutive years." Quezon's term as President, then, would end on November 15, 1943.

President Quezon sent a lengthy letter to President Roosevelt on October 17, 1943, emphasizing that, "Japanese invasion has destroyed all semblance of constitutional government and its institutions in the Philippines and it seems to me that legally I should remain in office until I am returned by the might and power of the United States to the constitutional and lawful seat of my government... The power and authority to determine who is the head of government in exile in Washington rests exclusively with the President of the United States." In light of noncompliance with Article VII Section 2 of the Commonwealth constitution, Quezon was willing to submit the question of the legality of his status as President to the U.S. Congress. Vice President Osmeña initially demurred, but later agreed and, on November 12, 1943, the U.S. Congress passed Joint Resolution 95 authorizing the Philippine President and Vice President to "continue in their respective offices until the President of the United States shall proclaim that constitutional processes and normal functions of government shall have been restored to the Philippine Islands." The resolution was signed into law by President Roosevelt, ending the issue of presidential succession in the Philippine Commonwealth.

President Quezon suffered from tuberculosis and spent his last years in hospitals or tuberculosis resorts. For a month early in 1944, he stayed at Anne Hathaway Cottage on the grounds of Grove Park Inn in Asheville, North Carolina, which was home to the government in exile at the time.

He died on August 1, 1944, in Saranac Lake, New York. Vice President Osmeña became president of the Commonwealth upon Quezon's death. He was sworn in by Associate Justice Robert Jackson in Washington, D.C. He returned to the Philippines the same year with U.S. military liberation forces.
