= PT-34 =

PT-34 may refer to:

- Motor Torpedo Boat PT-34, a U.S. Navy boat sunk in World War II
- PT-34, a Soviet mine roller based on the T-34 medium tank
