= Herbert J. Ray =

US Admiral, born 1893

Herbert James Ray
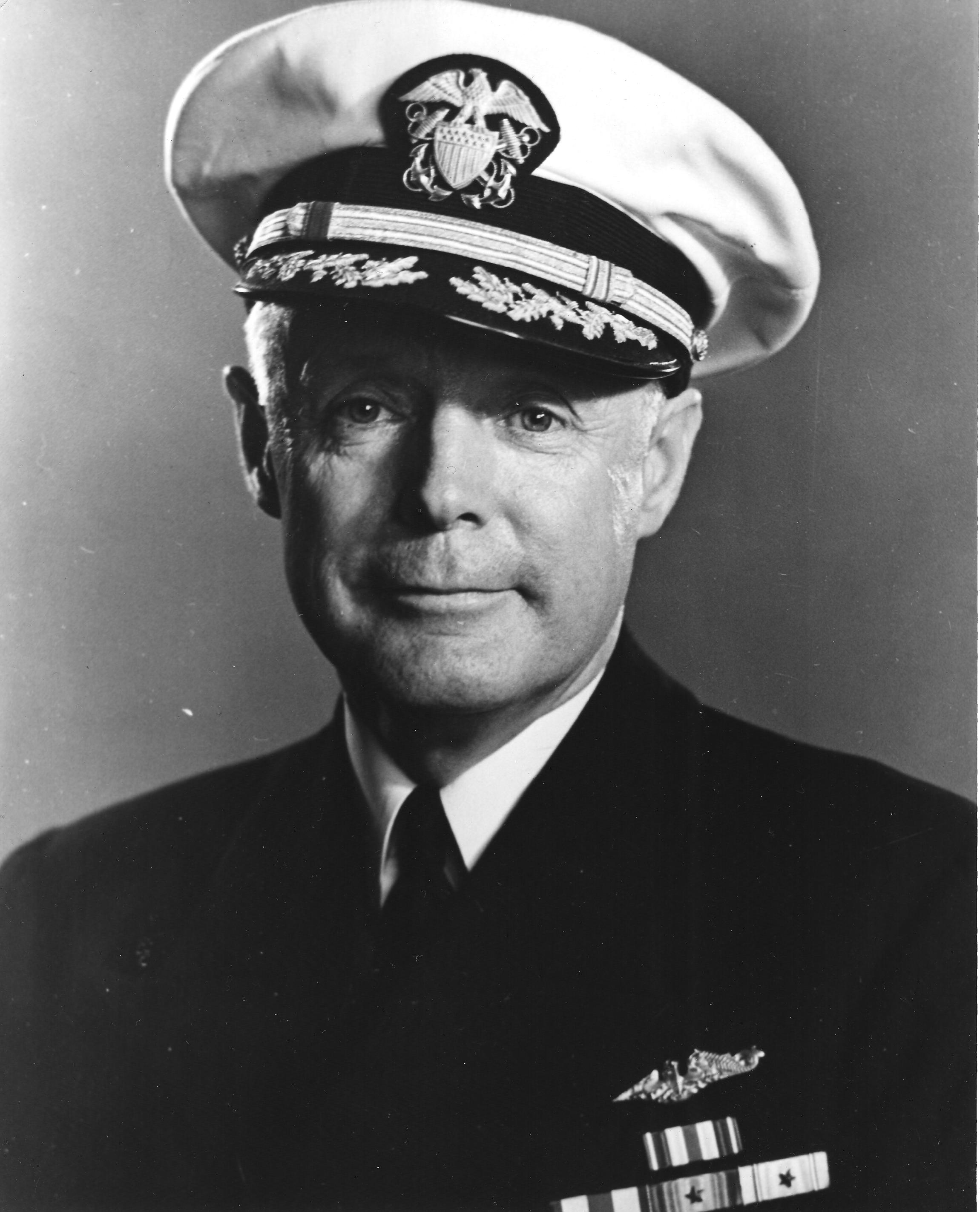
- Captain Herbert J. Ray
- Born: 1 February 1893; Milwaukee, Wisconsin, U.S.
- Died: 3 December 1970 (aged 77); Beale Air Force Base, California, U.S.
- Military career
- Allegiance: United States
- Branch: United States Navy
- Service years: 1914–1949
- Rank: Rear Admiral
- Service number: 0-8639
- Commands: USS Maryland; USS Farenholt
- Conflicts: World War I World War II: Philippines campaign (1941–1942); Battle of Tarawa; Battle of Kwajalein; Battle of Saipan; Battle of Peleliu; Battle of Leyte; Battle of Surigao Strait; Occupation of Germany
- Awards: Army Distinguished Service Medal; Legion of Merit (2); Silver Star (2); Bronze Star

Rear Admiral Herbert James Ray (1 February 1893 – 3 December 1970) was an officer in the United States Navy who served in World War I and World War II. A 1914 graduate of the Naval Academy, he served on the submarines USS H-2 and N-3 during World War I. In March 1942, as Chief of Staff and Aide to the Commandant of the Sixteenth Naval District, Rear Admiral Francis W. Rockwell, he participated in General Douglas MacArthur's escape from the Philippines. In Australia, he served with MacArthur's General Headquarters, Southwest Pacific Area staff. In September 1943, he became Captain of the battleship USS Maryland, which he commanded in the Battle of Tarawa, Battle of Kwajalein, Battle of Saipan and the Battle of Peleliu. In October 1944, he participated in the Battle of Surigao Strait, in which Maryland joined the other battleships in engaging the Japanese battleships Fusō and Yamashiro and their escorts. Ray left Maryland in December 1944, and was promoted to Commodore and appointed deputy director of the Naval Division of the US Control Group Council for Germany. After VE Day, he became the Junior United States Member of the Tripartite Naval Commission in Berlin. He retired from the Navy on 30 June 1949, and received a tombstone promotion to rear admiral due to his combat decorations.

== Early life ==
Herbert James Ray was born in Milwaukee, Wisconsin, on 1 February 1893, the son of James Herbert Ray and his wife Mary née Rosseler. He was educated at Rhea County High School. In 1910, he was appointed to the United States Naval Academy at Annapolis, from which he graduated on 6 June 1914.

On graduation, he was commissioned as an ensign, and joined the crew of the battleship USS Minnesota. In July 1915, he became an instructor for enlisted ratings in Norfolk, Virginia. He then became part of the crew that was assembled for the new battleship USS Nevada in January 1916, and served on it when it was commissioned in March 1916. After the United States declared war on Germany, he underwent submariner training on board the submarine tender USS Fulton from June to November 1917. During the war he served on the submarines USS H-2 and N-3.

== Between the wars ==
After the war, Ray was posted to the battleship USS Pennsylvania in March 1919, the submarine tender USS Savannah in July 1919, and the destroyer USS Meyer February 1920. He then became the Executive Officer of the destroyer USS Walker. In November 1920, he helped fit out the destroyer USS Young, and served on it until April 1921, when he was transferred to the crew of another new destroyer, the USS Macdonough. He helped fit it out, and then served with it until September 1921.

Ray returned to Annapolis as an instructor with the Electrical Engineering and Physics Department from September 1921 to June 1923. He then served on the transport USS Argonne until December 1924, when he became the Executive Officer of the destroyer USS Wood. In 1926, he assumed command of the destroyer USS Farenholt. In July, he became Officer in Charge of the Branch Hydrographic Office in Honolulu. He was Aide and Flag Secretary to the Commander Light Cruiser 2 from May 1928 to June 1930; Light Cruiser Divisions, Scouting Fleet from June to September 1930; and Light Cruiser 3 from September 1930 to July 1931. Ray married Helen Louise Jacobs from La Plata, Maryland in 1930. They had two daughters and two sons.

Ray was the Navy Representative on the Joint Army-Navy Selective Services Committee at the War Department in Washington, D.C., from July 1931 to September 1933. He then helped fit out the new cruiser USS New Orleans, and became first he First Lieutenant and Damage Control Officer, and then, in February 1935, he Executive Officer. Following the usual pattern of alternating duty afloat and ashore, he returned to Annapolis in July 1936 for a second two-year tour as an instructor, this time in the Department of English and History. In June 1938 he entered the Naval War College at Newport, Rhode Island. After graduating in June 1939, he became the Executive Officer of the USS Quincy.

== World War II ==
=== Southwest Pacific ===
In March 1941, Ray became Chief of Staff and Aide to the Commandant of the Sixteenth Naval District, Rear Admiral Francis W. Rockwell, at Cavite, where he was promoted to captain on 1 July 1941. He was serving in this capacity when the Pacific War began. He was awarded the Legion of Merit for his part in the fighting. His citation read:

For exceptionally meritorious conduct in the performance of outstanding services to the Government of the United States as Chief of Staff in the Sixteenth Naval District at the outbreak of World War II. Captain Ray continuously performed duties of great responsibility during and after the bombing and destruction of Cavite Navy Yard on 10 December 1941. In the direction of fire fighting at Cavite, in the evacuation of personnel and material to Corregidor, and in the administration of Mariveles Naval Section Base, a Naval Facility at Mariveles on Bataan Peninsula, he displayed courage and marked leadership. His close personal contact with the personnel of Motor Torpedo Boat Squadron Three and constant concern with their problems was an outstanding example of leadership and exceptional efficiency in his profession. During this entire period of great stress, he performed exceptionally meritorious service to the government in duties of great responsibility. Captain Ray was sent to Mariveles on 14 December to supervise the work there and Commander Francis J. Grandfield temporarily assumed the duties of Chief of Staff. On completion of a reorganization at Mariveles, Captain Ray was ordered to Queen Tunnel Corregidor and resumed his duties as Chief of Staff.

In March 1942, he participated in General Douglas MacArthur's escape from the Philippines, for which Ray was awarded the Silver Star. His citation read:

For extraordinary heroism and distinguished service in the line of his profession while serving on the Staff of Rear Admiral Francis Rockwell, Commandant, Sixteenth Naval District, during the period 11 to 13 March 1942, in the Philippine Islands during an extraordinary action a retrograde maneuver involving General Douglas MacArthur. Captain Ray made detailed plans involving exacting preparations for a movement of major strategic importance and of the most hazardous nature, then executed the mission with marked skill and coolness in the face of greatly superior enemy forces.

In Australia, Ray served with MacArthur's General Headquarters, Southwest Pacific Area. One of his sons, Lieutenant James H. Ray, was on the destroyer USS Jarvis when it was lost with all hands on 9 August 1942. When Ray was ordered back to the United States in January 1943, MacArthur awarded him the Army Distinguished Service Medal. His citation read:

For exceptionally meritorious and distinguished services to the Government of the United States, in a duty of great responsibility in the Southwest Pacific Area during the period from 18 April 1942 to 26 April 1943. Captain Ray was assigned to General Headquarters, Southwest Pacific Area, upon its establishment, 18 April 1942, serving as Naval Advisor to the Operations and Intelligence sections of the General Staff from 18 April 1942 to 9 January 1943. Upon the establishment of the Planning Section of G-3, 9 January 1943, he was assigned as Chief of that section. The accomplishment of the service for which this award is recommended has been completed. This officer has been transferred to another assignment. The entire service of Captain Ray has, since the rendering by him of the service upon which this recommendation is based, been honorable.

=== USS Maryland ===
Ray served in the office of the Commander in Chief United States Fleet, Admiral Ernest J. King from April to September 1943. He then became Captain of the battleship USS Maryland. The ship had been damaged in the Japanese attack on Pearl Harbor in December 1941 but returned to service. Maryland participated in the Battle of Tarawa in November 1943 as the flagship of Rear Admiral Harry W. Hill's V Amphibious Force and Southern Attack Force, and her guns participated in the shore bombardment. In February 1944, she joined in the Battle of Kwajalein, firing at pillboxes and blockhouses on Roi Island. Maryland's guns supported the Battle of Saipan, silencing a pair of coastal guns. On 22 June, she was torpedoed by a Mitsubishi G4M "Betty" bomber, but was repaired in time to join Rear Admiral Jesse B. Oldendorf's Western Fire Support Group in the Battle of Peleliu. Still with Oldendorff's group, but now part of the Vice Admiral Thomas C. Kinkaid's Seventh Fleet, Maryland participated in the Battle of Leyte in October. In the Battle of Surigao Strait, it joined the other battleships in engaging the Japanese battleships Fusō and Yamashiro and their escorts. Ray was awarded a second Silver Star. His citation read:

for gallantry and intrepidity in action as Commanding Officer of the USS Maryland (BB-46), which contributed materially to the annihilation of enemy surface forces, including two battleships, on 25 October 1944, in Surigao Straits, Philippine Islands. Captain Ray, by his capable direction, caused his ship to deliver prolonged and effective gunfire against the enemy's ships.

On 29 November, Maryland was attacked and severely damaged by kamikaze aircraft, and forced to return to Pearl Harbor for repairs. For his services as captain, he was awarded the Bronze Star.

=== Germany ===
Ray left Maryland in December 1944. He was appointed deputy director of the Naval Division of the US Control Group Council for Germany. After VE Day, he became the Junior United States Member of the Tripartite Naval Commission in Berlin. He was promoted to the wartime rank of commodore on 26 June 1945. He returned to the United States in April 1946. For his services in Europe, he was awarded a second Legion of Merit. His citation read:

For exceptionally meritorious conduct in the performance of outstanding services to the Government of the United States in Germany from 1 March 1945 to 20 December 1945. Commodore Ray distinguished himself by unusually meritorious accomplishments as Deputy Director of the Naval Division, U.S. Group Control Council for Germany, and later, as Deputy Naval Advisor to the Office of Military Government for Germany (U.S.), and as junior member of the Tri-Partite Naval Commission meeting in Berlin from 15 August 1945 until 8 December 1945. In this duty, he contributed in a high degree to the successful conclusion to the Tri-Partite Naval Commission. He was instrumental in coordinating the Naval work of the U.S. Group Control Council, and other divisions of the U.S. Group Control Council, and in coordinating the efforts of the four powers represented on the Naval Directorate of the Group Control Council for Germany.

== Later life ==
Ray became Commander of the San Francisco Group of the Nineteenth Fleet in June 1946. On 10 July, like many other commodores, he was reduced in rank to captain again. He served in this capacity until he retired on 30 June 1949, at which point he received a tombstone promotion to rear admiral due to his combat decorations. He died on 3 December 1970 at Beale Air Force Base Hospital in California.
