= Francis W. Rockwell =

Francis W. Rockwell may refer to:

- Francis W. Rockwell (politician)
- Francis W. Rockwell (admiral)
