= USS Thatcher (DD-162) =

Wickes-class destroyer

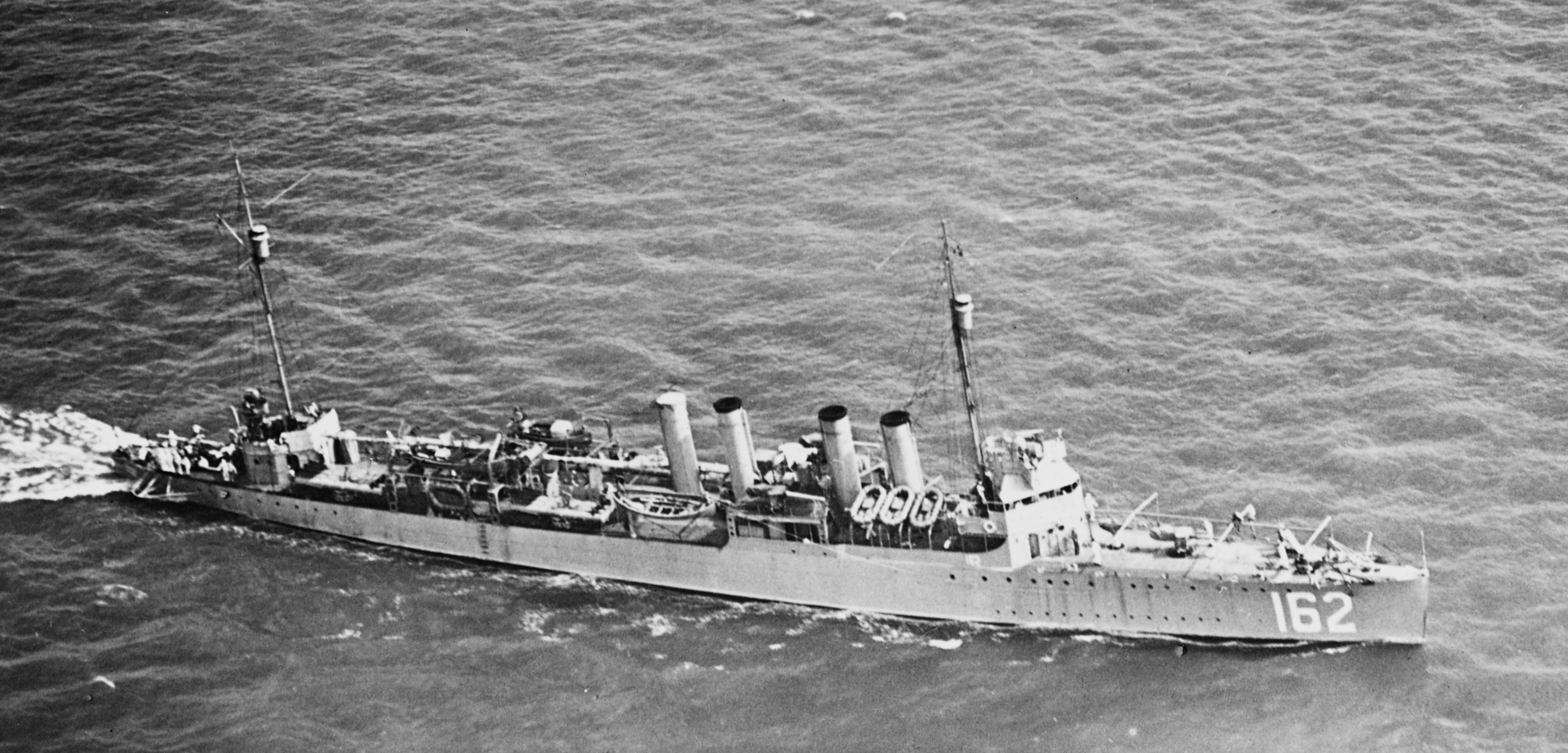
- USS Thatcher underway, circa 1920

History

United States
- Name: USS Thatcher
- Namesake: Henry K. Thatcher
- Builder: Fore River Shipyard, Quincy, Massachusetts
- Laid down: 8 June 1918
- Launched: 31 August 1918
- Commissioned: 14 January 1919
- Decommissioned: 7 June 1922
- Recommissioned: 18 December 1939
- Decommissioned: 24 September 1940
- Stricken: 8 January 1941
- Identification: DD-162
- Fate: Transferred to United Kingdom, 24 September 1940

Canada
- Name: HMCS Niagara
- Namesake: Niagara River
- Acquired: 24 September 1940
- Decommissioned: 27 May 1946
- Identification: Pennant number: I57
- Honours and awards: Atlantic 1940-44
- Fate: Scrapped 1946

General characteristics
- Class & type: Wickes-class destroyer
- Displacement: 1,191 tons
- Length: 314 ft 4 1/2 in (95.822 m)
- Beam: 30 ft 11 1/4 in (9.430 m)
- Draft: 9 ft 2 in (2.79 m)
- Speed: 35 kn (65 km/h; 40 mph)
- Complement: 122 officers and enlisted
- Armament: 4 × 4 in (102 mm)/50 guns; 2 × 3 in (76 mm)/23 guns; 12 × 21 inch (533 mm) torpedo tubes

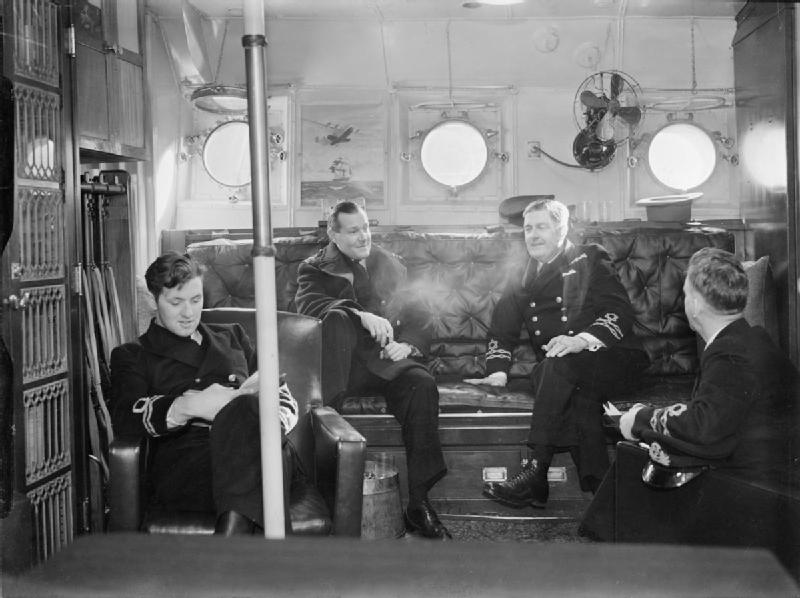
Wardroom of HMCS Niagara.

The first USS Thatcher (DD–162) was a Wickes-class destroyer in the United States Navy, later transferred to the Royal Canadian Navy as HMCS Niagara.

== Construction and career ==
=== United States Navy ===
Named for Admiral Henry K. Thatcher, she was laid down on 8 June 1918 at Quincy, Massachusetts, by the Fore River Plant of the Bethlehem Shipbuilding Corporation. The ship was launched on 31 August 1918; sponsored by Miss Doris Bentley, the grandniece of Rear Admiral Thatcher. Thatcher was commissioned on 14 January 1919. On 25 January, Lieutenant Commander Francis W. Rockwell assumed command.

Following shakedown, Thatcher operated with the Atlantic Fleet into the autumn of 1919. During the transatlantic NC-boat flights in May 1919, the destroyer operated on picket station number 9—one of 21 stations strung out from Newfoundland to the Azores—between her sister ships Walker and Crosby. Underway at sea, she provided visual and radio bearings for the flying boats as they passed overhead on their way toward Lisbon, Portugal.

Upon completion of this duty, the destroyer—reclassified as DD-162 on 17 July 1920—resumed her routine training operations off the eastern seaboard before heading west in the autumn of 1921 to join the Pacific Fleet. She operated out of San Diego, conducting exercises and training cruises off the west coast until decommissioned at San Diego on 7 June 1922.

Thatcher remained laid-up at San Diego through the summer of 1939. War broke out in Europe on 1 September 1939, when German troops invaded Poland. Thatcher was recommissioned at San Diego on 18 December 1939 and conducted shakedown and training evolutions off the west coast until transferred to the Atlantic the following spring. Transiting the Panama Canal on 1 April 1940, a month before the situation in Europe became critical when Germany began her blitzkrieg against France and the Low Countries, Thatcher subsequently conducted neutrality patrols and training cruises off the east coast and in the Gulf of Mexico through the summer of 1940.

The European situation took a drastic turn with the fall of France in June 1940. British destroyer forces in the wake of the Norwegian campaign and the evacuation of Dunkirk found themselves thinly spread—especially after Italy entered the war on Germany's side. Prime Minister Winston Churchill appealed to the United States for help.

In response, Franklin D. Roosevelt issued an executive order authorizing the transfer of 50 over-aged destroyers to the British in return for 99-year leases on strategic base sites in the Western Hemisphere. Thatcher was accordingly withdrawn from the Atlantic Squadron and her operations with Destroyer Division 69 for transfer to the Royal Canadian Navy, which had been allocated six of the "50 ships that saved the world," as these vessels came to be known.

As such, Thatcher and her five sisters arrived at Halifax, Nova Scotia, on 20 September—the third group of the "flush deckers" transferred. Decommissioned on 24 September 1940, Thatcher was struck from the Navy list on 8 January 1941.

=== Royal Canadian Navy ===
Renamed HMCS Niagara following the Canadian practice of naming destroyers after Canadian rivers (but with deference to the U.S. origin), after the Niagara River forming the border between New York and Ontario. Niagara departed Halifax on 30 November; proceeded eastward via St. John's, Newfoundland; and arrived in the British Isles on 11 December. Early in 1941, the destroyer was allocated to the 4th Escort Group, Western Approaches Command, and based at Greenock, Scotland. Subsequently transferred to the Newfoundland escort force, Niagara operated on convoy escort duties into the summer of 1941. While she was operating with this force, she took part in the capture of a German U-boat, U-570.

A Lockheed Hudson bomber, flying from Kaldaðarnes, 30 miles (48 km) southeast of Reykjavík, Iceland, located U-570 running on the surface off the Icelandic coast on 27 August 1941. The Hudson attacked the U-boat with depth charges, damaging the enemy craft so severely that she could not submerge. Soon, some of the German crew appeared on deck displaying a large white cloth — possibly a bed sheet — indicating that they had surrendered. Patently unable to capture the submarine herself, the Hudson radioed for help.

Niagara sped to the scene and arrived at 08:20 on 28 August 1941. Rough weather initially hampered the operation but eventually, by 18:00, Niagara had placed a prize crew aboard the submarine and had taken U-570 in tow. During the operation, she also took the 43-man crew of the enemy craft on board. Towed to Þorlákshöfn, Iceland, the U-boat eventually served in the Royal Navy as HMS Graph.

In January 1942, Niagara escorted the tempest-battered Danish merchantman Triton into Belfast, Northern Ireland, after the freighter had been severely mauled in a storm at sea. In March the destroyer rescued the survivors from the US merchantman SS Independence Hall, which had run aground off Sable Island, Nova Scotia, and had broken in half. The next month, she picked up two boatloads of survivors from the sunken steamer SS Rio Blanco, which had been torpedoed by U-160 on 1 April 1942, 40 nautical miles (74 km) east of Cape Hatteras, North Carolina.

The destroyer subsequently underwent boiler repairs at Pictou, Nova Scotia from May to August 1942 before resuming coastwise convoy operations between Halifax and New York and escort duty in the western Atlantic. Another refit at Pictou came in June and October 1943, before she continued her coastwise convoy escort missions through 1944.

Niagara became a torpedo-firing ship — first at Halifax and later at Saint John, New Brunswick — from the spring of 1945 until the end of World War II in mid-August 1945, training torpedomen. Decommissioned on 15 September 1945, Niagara was turned over to the War Assets Corporation on 27 May 1946 and broken up for scrap soon thereafter.
