= Patrol torpedo boat PT-34 =

Torpedo boat of the United States Navy

History

United States Navy
- Name: PT-34
- Builder: Electric Launch Company, Bayonne, New Jersey
- Laid down: 29 March 1941
- Launched: 14 June 1941
- Completed: 12 July 1941
- Fate: Sunk, 9 April 1942

General characteristics
- Class & type: Elco 77-foot PT boat
- Displacement: 40 long tons (41 t)
- Length: 77 ft (23 m)
- Beam: 19 ft 11 in (6.07 m)
- Draft: 4 ft 6 in (1.37 m)
- Propulsion: 3 × 1,500 shp (1,119 kW) Packard V12 M2500 gasoline engines, 3 shafts
- Speed: 41 knots (76 km/h; 47 mph)
- Complement: 15
- Armament: 4 × 21 in (533 mm) torpedoes; 2 × twin .50 cal. M2 Browning machine guns in Dewandre turrets; 2 × .303 cal. Lewis guns

Service record
- Part of: MTB Squadron 2 (July–August 1941); MTB Squadron 3 (August 1941 – April 1942)
- Commanders: Lt. Robert B. Kelly
- Operations: Philippines campaign (1941–1942)

Patrol torpedo boat PT-34 was a PT-20-class motor torpedo boat of the United States Navy, built by the Electric Launch Company of Bayonne, New Jersey. The boat was laid down as Motor boat submarine chaser PTC-14, but was reclassified as PT-34 prior to its launch on 14 June 1941, and was commissioned on 12 July 1941.

== Service history ==
PT-34 was placed in service with Motor Torpedo Boat Squadron Two` (PTRon 2), and was transferred to Motor Torpedo Boat Squadron Three (PTRon 3) on 12 August 1941. Under the command Lt(jg). Robert B. Kelly (also the executive officer of Motor Torpedo Boat Squadron Three), PT-34 was based in the Philippines.

On 17 December 1941, SS Corregidor, a passenger ship loaded with 1,200 passengers, struck a mine off Corregidor and sank with a large loss of life. PT-34, along with squadron mates PT-32 and PT-35 rescued some 280 survivors, who were distributed between Corregidor and French ship SS Si-Kiang.

On the night of 22 January 1942 during the Battle of the Points, Japanese troops of the 20th Infantry attempted a landing on the west coast of southern Bataan. Intercepted by PT-34, two barges were sunk, disrupting the landings.

On 12 March 1942 the boat evacuated Admiral Francis W. Rockwell, General Richard Marshall (Deputy Chief of Staff, USAFFE), Col. Charles P. Stivers (G-1 [Personnel], USFFEE), Capt. Joseph McMicking (Philippine Army, Asst. G-2 [Intelligence], USFFE) from Corregidor to Mindanao as part of the operation to evacuate General Douglas MacArthur to Australia.

On the night of 8 April 1942, off Cebu, the Kuma and the torpedo boat Kiji were attacked by PT-34 in concert with PT-41. Both PT boats reported seeing multiple torpedo hits on the Kuma from their attack, but according to Japanese Navy records examined after the war, the Kuma was hit in the bow by one of the torpedoes fired by PT-34, but it failed to detonate.

PT-34 was attacked near Kauit Island by four Japanese F1M "Pete" floatplanes from the Sanuki Maru on 9 April 1942, in the aftermath of the Kuma attack. With three feet of water in the engine room, Lt. Kelly beached the boat, and abandoned it. PT-34 was later strafed by Japanese aircraft, set on fire and destroyed. The crew suffered one KiA, one DoW, and three WiA. Kelly was later transported out of the Philippines along with three other officers of the squadron. The executive officer Iliff David Richardson remained in the Philippines with the guerrilla forces, and later an account of his experiences were published in a book (later made into a film) American Guerrilla in the Philippines.
