= Ira Wolfert =

American novelist

- Born: November 1, 1908; New York City, New York, U.S.
- Died: November 24, 1997 (aged 89); Margaretville, New York, U.S.
- Education: Columbia University Graduate School of Journalism
- Occupations: War correspondent, novelist

Ira Wolfert (November 1, 1908 – November 24, 1997) was an American Pulitzer Prize-winning war correspondent and a fiction and non-fiction writer.

== Early life and education ==
Wolfert was born in New York City, New York.

In 1930, he graduated from the Columbia University School of Journalism with a bachelor's degree.

== Career ==
Wolfert was a correspondent for the North American Newspaper Alliance from the 1930s through World War II. In 1941, he was aboard the Surcouf when it helped to liberate Saint Pierre and Miquelon. His series of articles about the November 1942 Naval Battle of Guadalcanal won him the Pulitzer Prize for Telegraphic Reporting (International).

In 1944, Wolfert co-wrote One-Man Air Force with Captain Don Gentile, a leading fighter ace. The book is an autobiography of Gentile and details his exploits as a fighter pilot flying P-51 Mustangs with the Eighth Air Force.

His first novel, Tucker's People about a vicious New York gangster, published in 1943, was well received by both critics and the general public. Wolfert co-wrote the screenplay for the film adaptation, Force of Evil, released in 1948. That same year, he had another success with the novel An Act of Love. He also wrote non-fiction, including the 1943 bestselling eyewitness account Battle for the Solomons and the 1945 American Guerrilla in the Philippines, which recounts the exploits of Navy officer Iliff David Richardson and was made into a 1950 film of the same name, starring Tyrone Power as Richardson. After the war, he continued to write, mainly articles for Reader's Digest.

The House Un-American Activities Committee considered the leftist Wolfert a communist by association.

== Personal life ==
In 1928, Wolfert married Helen Herschdorfer, a poet. They had two children, Ruth and Michael. Their marriage lasted 57 years, until Helen died in 1985.

On November 24, 1997, Wolfert died in Margaretville, New York, at the age of 89.
