= Iliff David Richardson =

American Army and Navy officer

- Born: April 9, 1918; Denver, Colorado
- Died: October 10, 2001 (aged 83); Houston, Texas
- Military career
- Allegiance: United States
- Branch: United States Navy
- Rank: Lieutenant
- Nickname: Rich
- Units: PT 34, Motor Torpedo Boat Squadron Three
- Conflicts: World War II
- Awards: Silver Star with oak leaf cluster

Iliff David "Rich" Richardson (April 9, 1918 – October 10, 2001) was simultaneously a US Navy ensign and a US Army major while fighting with the Philippine resistance against Japan during World War II. He recounted his exploits to author Ira Wolfert, who published them in the book American Guerrilla in the Philippines in 1945. A character based on Richardson was played by Tyrone Power in the 1950 film of the same name.

== Biography ==
=== Early life ===
Richardson was the only surviving child of Methodist Minister Royal Richardson, who died when Iliff was three years old. His mother Velma Weston Richardson taught Latin and music and raised Iliff in a variety of Colorado towns and her father's Nebraska ranch, located northwest of Springview, Nebraska. After his death, the Richardsons went to live in Los Angeles.

Iliff studied at Compton Junior College, then travelled through Europe, the Near and Middle East, returning to the US before the fall of France in World War II.

=== Wartime career ===
In 1940, he was commissioned an ensign in the US Navy and was posted to USS Bittern, a minesweeper in the Philippines. He later transferred to Motor Torpedo Boat Squadron Three, commanded by John D. Bulkeley. Richardson was the executive officer of PT 34, under Bob Kelly.

PT-34 and PT-41 attacked the Japanese cruiser Kuma one night and then separated, PT-34 making its way back to Cebu City, where it was strafed by Japanese planes, setting it on fire. He then helped burn the town just before the Japanese arrived. Richardson then served with the US Army, setting off demolition charges in Cebu City. When the Japanese captured General Chynoweth's headquarters, Richardson headed to Leyte, making it to Tacloban, and the headquarters of Col. Cornell. Making his way to Mindanao, he learned the Japanese had already taken Del Monte Airfield, so he returned to Leyte with 11 other Americans. With 400 pesos out of the 2000 the colonel gave him, Richardson purchased a single-masted banca and sail.

Richardson and 11 other Americans, all Air Corps but two, attempted to sail the native outrigger to Australia against the summer southwest monsoon, but the boat was sunk by a storm on 18 May after only traveling 200 miles. Richardson and Pierson swam 8 miles to shore in 19 hours, where his men and he were rescued by Filipinos from a fishing village.

The summer of 1942 was quiet for Richardson and the other Americans on Mindanao until September, when armed resistance against the Japanese started in Balingasag, Misamis Oriental. Richardson headed for Malitbog, the next year, hoping to see his girlfriend "Curly". Col. Morgan was there, working with Col. Wendell Fertig, to unify and organize the guerrillas before General MacArthur would recognize them.

Richardson eventually joined the Philippine guerrilla forces of Ruperto Kangleon, and offered to establish contact with Col. Fertig on Mindanao. Richardson was successful in meeting Col. Edward McClishs' band of guerrillas, including many Americans such as Ed Dyess. McClishish led Richardson to Fertig, in Misamis Occidental, where Richardson delivered Kangleon's letter. While there, Richardson met Chick Parsons and agreed to set up radio stations around Leyte and Samar, and provide intelligence on Japanese ship movements. Richardson rejoined Kangleon on 16 Aug., and became his chief of staff. He also quickly re-established the telegraph system for immediate communication of intelligence. Kangleon then moved his headquarters from Maasin to Don Lorenzo's Casa in Malitbog.

Richardson was a former ham radio operator. He set up a radio station on Leyte, manned by Joseph St. John and Chapman, and a radio station on Samar, manned by Truman Heminway. In November 1943, under orders from Col. Fertig, Kangleon, Richardson, and other guerrilla leaders were in Mindanao to coordinate activities, and meet the submarine USS Narwhal delivering American aid. By Christmas 1943, Richardson had a master radio set operating to communicate with Mindanao. However, by then the Japanese had made the Casa, in Malitbog, their headquarters for southern Leyte.

On February 1, 1944, Kangleon's forces went on the offensive, which included attacks on Japanese garrisons at Anahawan and Linoan, forcing the Japanese to not venture away from the coastal towns of southern Leyte. Richardson then assisted in the establishment of a weather station, manned by two submarine arrivals, including the son of Walter S. Gamertsfelder. Next, Richardson established a radio station on Samar and plotted the Surigao Strait mine field from Homonhon Island. By September 12, Richardson was operating a radio station near Balangiga, Eastern Samar.

Richardson was picked up by a US destroyer during the Battle of Leyte, and transferred to USS Nashville, where he met General MacArthur and General Kenney. For his work, Richardson was made a US Army Intelligence major by General Douglas MacArthur, holding commissions in the army and navy simultaneously. He is the only person to receive consecutive medals in both the Army and the Navy.

When attempting to get his back pay, Richardson was told by a naval pay clerk that he was dead. After receiving his pay, Richardson was incorrectly thought to be drawing pay from both the Army and Navy. Richardson was given notices of four courts-martial in as many days. After telling Admiral Ernest King and others of his experiences, all charges were dropped and King personally apologized to him.

Richardson was promoted to full lieutenant and made speeches across the United States.

=== Memoirs ===
After the liberation of the Philippines, Richardson transcribed his memoirs to Pulitzer Prize-winning war correspondent and author Ira Wolfert of the North American Newspaper Alliance. Wolfert turned it into a book, An American Guerrilla in the Philippines, which became both a Book-of-the-Month Club selection and a condensed book in the March 1945 Reader's Digest. Darryl F. Zanuck of 20th Century Fox bought the film rights and had Lamar Trotti write a screenplay by August 1945. The end of the war led Zanuck to shelve all films with a World War II theme. It was eventually made five years after the end of the war. The name of the central character was changed to "Chuck Palmer" and he was given a fictional love-interest for dramatic purposes, but based on Richardson's girlfriend "Curly".

=== Postwar career ===
Following the war, Richardson married Coma Noel and lived in Houston, Texas, where he worked as a business executive, life insurance salesman, and a consultant, as well as acting as technical advisor for several Hollywood films.

Richardson also attempted to manufacture and sell a single-shot slamfire "Philippine Guerrilla Gun" shotgun through his Richardson Industries in East Haven, Connecticut, that he set up in 1946. With a wide variety of shotguns brought back from Europe and American-manufactured weapons, it did not sell very well. Thomas F. Swearingen noted in his book World's Fighting Shotguns, "The American market would not tolerate such a primitive firearm, even as a curio."

Many years later, Richardson told a meeting of Eagle Scouts that he learned how to live as a guerrilla through his days in Los Angeles Boy Scout Troop 92.

== See also ==
- List of American guerrillas in the Philippines
- Iliff David Richardson - Obituary in Los Angeles Times, 2001-Oct-23
