= Patrol torpedo boat PT-41 =

Torpedo boat of the U.S. Navy famous for evacuating General Douglas MacArthur

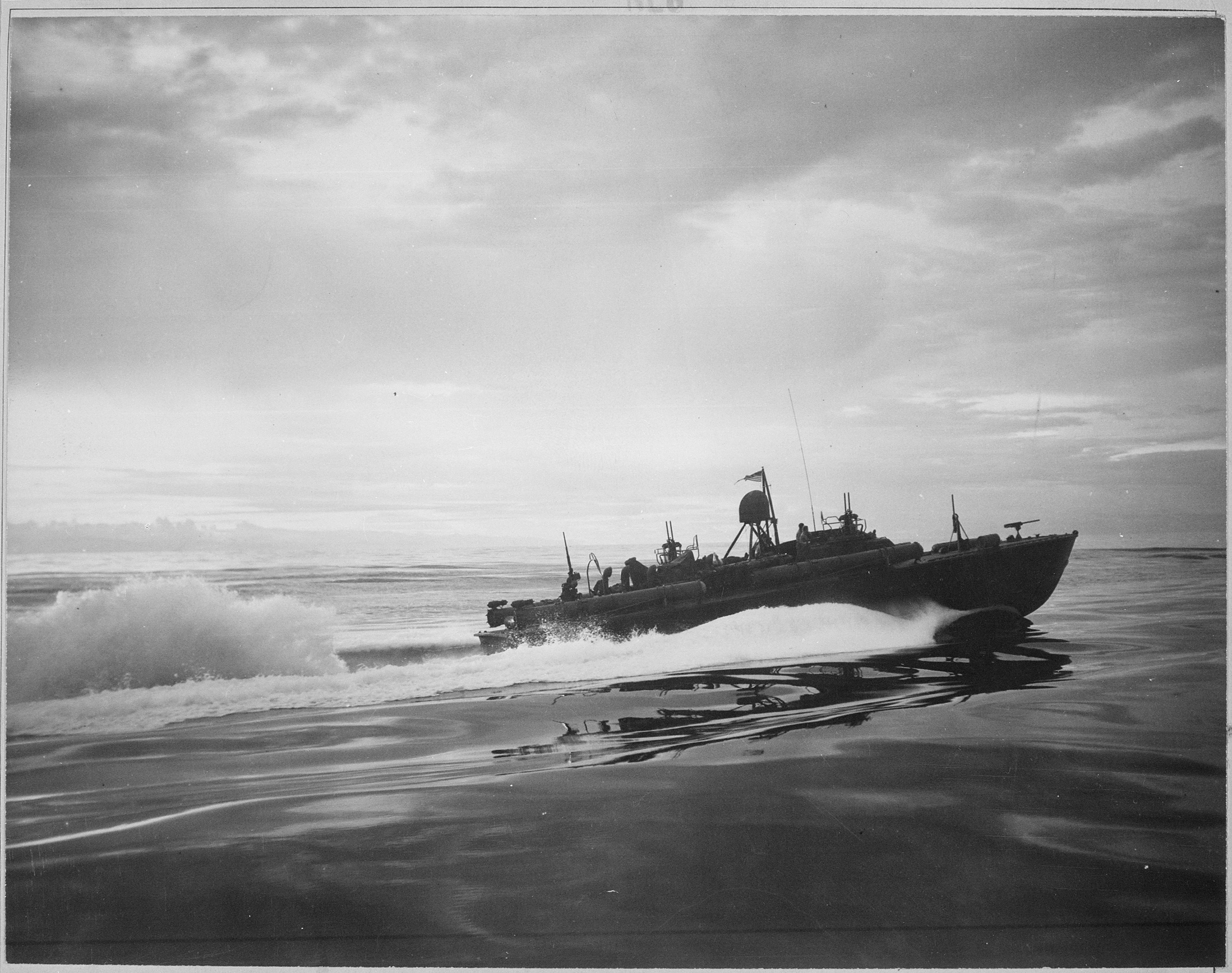
- Motor Torpedo Boat patrolling off coast of New Guinea

History

United States Navy
- Name: PT-41
- Builder: Electric Launch Company, Bayonne, New Jersey
- Laid down: 30 April 1941
- Launched: 8 July 1941
- Completed: 23 July 1941
- Fate: Destroyed to prevent capture, 15 April 1942

General characteristics
- Class & type: Elco 77-foot PT boat
- Displacement: 40 long tons (41 t)
- Length: 77 ft (23 m)
- Beam: 19 ft 11 in (6.07 m)
- Draft: 4 ft 6 in (1.37 m)
- Propulsion: 3 × 1,500 shp (1,119 kW) Packard V12 M2500 gasoline engines, 3 shafts
- Speed: 41 knots (76 km/h; 47 mph)
- Complement: 15
- Armament: 4 × 18 in (457 mm) torpedoes; 2 × twin .50 cal. M2 Browning machine guns in Dewandre turrets; 2 × .303 cal. Lewis guns

Service record
- Part of: MTB Squadron 1 (July–August 1941); MTB Squadron 3 (Flagship – August 1941 – April 1942)
- Commanders: Ensign George E. Cox Jr, USNR
- Operations: Philippines campaign (1941–1942)

Patrol torpedo boat PT-41 was a PT-20-class motor torpedo boat of the United States Navy, built by the Electric Launch Company of Bayonne, New Jersey. The boat was laid down as Motor Boat Submarine Chaser PTC-21, but was reclassified as PT-41 prior to its launch on 8 July 1941, and was completed on 23 July 1941. It was used to evacuate General Douglas MacArthur from Corregidor at the beginning of the war in the Pacific in World War II.

== Boat history ==
PT-41 served as the flagship of Motor Torpedo Boat Squadron Three, which was based in the Philippines from late 1941 to April 1942. The commander of Motor Torpedo Boats Squadron 3 was Lieutenant John D. Bulkeley, who became one of the U.S. Navy's most highly decorated officers. The commander of PT-41 was Ensign George E. Cox, Jr., USNR.

PT-41 evacuated General (later General of the Army) Douglas MacArthur, Mrs. Jean MacArthur, Arthur MacArthur IV (their four-year-old son), Ah Cheu (Arthur's amah), Major General Richard K. Sutherland (United States Army Forces in the Far East Chief of Staff), Captain Herbert J. Ray (USN), Lieutenant Colonel Sidney L. Huff (aide), and Major C.H. Morehouse (medical officer) from Corregidor to Mindanao on 12 March 1942; about the escape he made his famous declaration at Terowie, South Australia: "I came through and I shall return".

After MacArthur's party left Mindanao, PT-41, along with the two remaining PT boats of the squadron (PT-34 and PT-35), established a new base of operations at Cagayan de Oro, Mindanao, supporting the American military forces defending Mindanao and the nearby islands from the invading Japanese throughout late March and early April 1942.

After a torpedo attack in concert with PT-34 on the Kuma on 9 April 1942, PT-41 became the last remaining PT boat of the squadron (PT-34 was sunk in the aftermath of the attack and PT-35 was burned at Cebu). With no more torpedoes available for PT-41 to use, it was commandeered by the United States Army to patrol Lake Lanao, Mindanao. It was destroyed by the Army on 15 April 1942, to prevent its capture while being transported via road to Lake Lanao.

== Popular culture ==
The exploits of PT-41 are portrayed in the 1945 film They Were Expendable directed by John Ford with Robert Montgomery, John Wayne and Donna Reed.

== Awards ==
- Army Distinguished Unit Citation
- American Defense Service Medal with "FLEET" clasp
- Asiatic-Pacific Campaign Medal with one battle star
- World War II Victory Medal
- Philippine Presidential Unit Citation
- Philippine Defense Medal with star
