= American Guerrilla in the Philippines =

1950 film by Fritz Lang

- original film poster
- Directed by: Fritz Lang
- Screenplay by: Lamar Trotti
- Based on: American Guerrilla in the Philippines (book) by Ira Wolfert
- Produced by: Lamar Trotti
- Starring: Tyrone Power; Micheline Presle; Tom Ewell; Robert Patten; Tommy Cook; Juan Torena; Jack Elam; Robert Barrat
- Narrated by: Jack Elam
- Cinematography: Harry Jackson
- Edited by: Robert Simpson
- Music by: Cyril Mockridge
- Production company: 20th Century Fox
- Distributed by: 20th Century Fox
- Release date: November 7, 1950 (New York)
- Running time: 105 minutes
- Country: United States
- Language: English
- Box office: $2,275,000 (US rentals)

American Guerrilla in the Philippines (released as I Shall Return in the UK) is a 1950 American war film directed by Fritz Lang and starring Tyrone Power as a U.S. Navy ensign stranded by the Japanese occupation of the Philippines in World War II. Based on the 1945 book of the same name by Ira Wolfert, it was filmed on location.

== Plot ==
In April 1942 in the Philippines, an American motor torpedo boat is destroyed by Japanese planes. The survivors, among them ensign Chuck Palmer, reach the shore of Cebu and their commander orders them to separate. Chuck pairs with Jim Mitchell and reaches Colonel Benson on Leyte, only to be told that he has been ordered by general Douglas MacArthur to surrender his forces soon.

Chuck helps Jeanne Martinez, a Frenchwoman married to a Filipino planter, acquire medical assistance for a pregnant woman. Jeanne pleads with Chuck to stay and fight, but he buys an outrigger canoe and recruits a crew of Air Corps soldiers in a desperate but unsuccessful attempt to sail to Australia. When the boat founders, the crew is rescued by Miguel, a member of the Filipino resistance. The Americans evade capture and Chuck eventually meets Jeanne again, as well as her husband Juan, a secret supporter of the resistance movement.

Chuck is ordered to stay in the Philippines to help establish a stay-behind network to gather intelligence on the Japanese. Later, Juan is beaten to death in front of Jeanne in an attempt to reveal the location where the guerrillas are hiding. Jeanne joins the resistance and is reunited with Chuck at Christmas 1943, and they begin to fall in love.

After three years of fighting, Chuck, Jeanne, Jim and the rest of their band are trapped in a church by a Japanese patrol. Just when it looks as if they will be killed, squadrons of American planes appear overhead and explosions are heard, announcing that the liberation of the Philippines is under way. The Japanese leave to face the greater threat.

== Cast ==
- Tyrone Power as Ensign Chuck Palmer
- Micheline Presle as Jeanne Martinez (as Micheline Prelle)
- Tom Ewell as Jim Mitchell
- Robert Patten as Lovejoy (as Bob Patten)
- Tommy Cook as Miguel
- Juan Torena as Juan Martinez
- Jack Elam as The Speaker
- Robert Barrat as General Douglas MacArthur

== Production ==
The film is based on the story of U.S. Navy ensign Iliff "Rich" Richardson, the executive officer of PT 34, which was sunk by the Japanese. Richardson and a dozen fellow Americans attempted to sail a native outrigger to Australia, but the boat was sunk in a storm. He eventually joined the Philippine guerrilla forces, establishing a radio network to keep the various bands in touch with each other and Allied forces in Australia. After the liberation of the Philippines, Richardson dictated his memoirs to war correspondent Ira Wolfert, who published them in 1945 as An American Guerilla in the Philippines. The book became a Book of the Month Club selection and was published in condensed form in the March 1945 issue of Reader's Digest.

Darryl F. Zanuck of Twentieth Century-Fox bought the film rights and commissioned Lamar Trotti to write a screenplay by August 1945. The original plan was to film in Puerto Rico with Fred MacMurray and William Bendix under the direction of Henry King, and later the plan changed to involve John Payne and Linda Darnell, to be filmed on Catalina Island. The end of the war led Zanuck to shelve all films with a World War II theme.

In 1950, American Guerrilla in the Philippines became the first American film to be shot on location in the Philippines in color. Fritz Lang directed the film but later said that it was his least favorite. When the film premiered in the Philippines, protests and the threat of a proposed boycott were raised because the names of Filipino actors were omitted from the credits. In response, the studio replaced the onscreen credits of several crew members with a new Technicolor card crediting 17 Filipino actors. Zanuck, who also worked on the script and edited it, rushed the film's completion to correspond with the start of the Korean War.

== Reception ==
On the review aggregator website Rotten Tomatoes, 56% of 9 critics' reviews are positive.

In a contemporary review for The New York Times, critic Bosley Crowther noted parallels between the film's setting and the new American military offensive in Korea, writing that "there is a fitful contemporary graphicness" about the film. Crowther also wrote: "[T]here is meager authority or credibility in 'American Guerilla in the Philippines.' Indeed, the whole picture has been brought off in such a perfunctory and artificial way that it seems more a misfired fiction than a semi-documentary report. ... [I]t is hard to believe that these experiences were quite as romantically hackneyed and pat as they are made to appear in this picture or that the participants in them were so dull."

== Preservation ==
The Academy Film Archive preserved American Guerrilla in the Philippines in 2001.
