= Douglas MacArthur's escape from the Philippines =

World War II escape

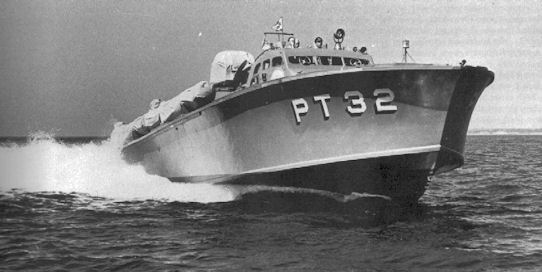
PT-32, one of the four PT-20 class motor torpedo boats involved in the first part of the journey

On 11 March 1942, during World War II, General Douglas MacArthur and members of his family and staff left the Philippine island of Corregidor, where his forces were surrounded by the Japanese. They traveled in PT boats through stormy seas patrolled by Japanese warships and reached Mindanao two days later. From there, MacArthur and his party flew to Australia in a pair of Boeing B-17 Flying Fortresses, ultimately arriving in Melbourne by train on 21 March. In Australia, he declared, "I came through and I shall return".

MacArthur was a well-known and experienced officer with a distinguished record in World War I, who had retired from the United States Army in 1937 and had become a defense advisor to the Philippine government. He was recalled to active duty with the United States Army in July 1941, a few months before the outbreak of the Pacific War between the United States and the Empire of Japan, to become commander of United States Army Forces in the Far East (USAFFE), uniting the Philippine and United States Armies under one command.

By March 1942, the Japanese invasion of the Philippines had compelled MacArthur to withdraw his forces on Luzon to Bataan, while his headquarters and his family moved to Corregidor. The doomed defense of Bataan captured the imagination of the American public. At a time when the news from all fronts was uniformly bad, MacArthur became a symbol of Allied resistance to the Japanese.

Fearing that Corregidor would soon fall, and MacArthur would be taken prisoner, President Franklin D. Roosevelt ordered MacArthur to go to Australia. A submarine was made available, but MacArthur elected to break through the Japanese blockade in PT boats under the command of Lieutenant John D. Bulkeley. The staff MacArthur brought with him became known as the "Bataan Gang". They would become the nucleus of his General Headquarters (GHQ) Southwest Pacific Area (SWPA).

== Background ==
Douglas MacArthur was a well-known and experienced officer. The son of Lieutenant General Arthur MacArthur Jr., who was awarded the Medal of Honor for his services in the American Civil War, MacArthur graduated at the top of the United States Military Academy class of 1903. He was an aide-de-camp to his father from 1905 to 1906, and to President Theodore Roosevelt from 1906 to 1907. During World War I he commanded the 84th Brigade of the 42nd (Rainbow) Division in the fighting on the Western Front. After the war he served as Superintendent of the United States Military Academy, and as Chief of Staff of the United States Army. He retired from the United States Army in 1937, and became a field marshal in the Philippine Army.

MacArthur's job was to advise the Philippine government on defense matters, and prepare the Philippine defense forces when the Philippines became fully independent, which was to be in 1946. The Philippine Army, almost entirely manned and officered by Filipinos with only a small number of American advisors, was raised by conscription, with two classes of 20,000 men being trained each year, starting in 1937. In addition, there was a regular U.S. Army garrison of about 10,000, half of whom were Filipinos serving in the U.S. Army known as Philippine Scouts. In July 1941, when MacArthur was recalled from retirement at the age of 61 to become commander of United States Army Forces in the Far East, he united the Philippine and United States armies under one command.

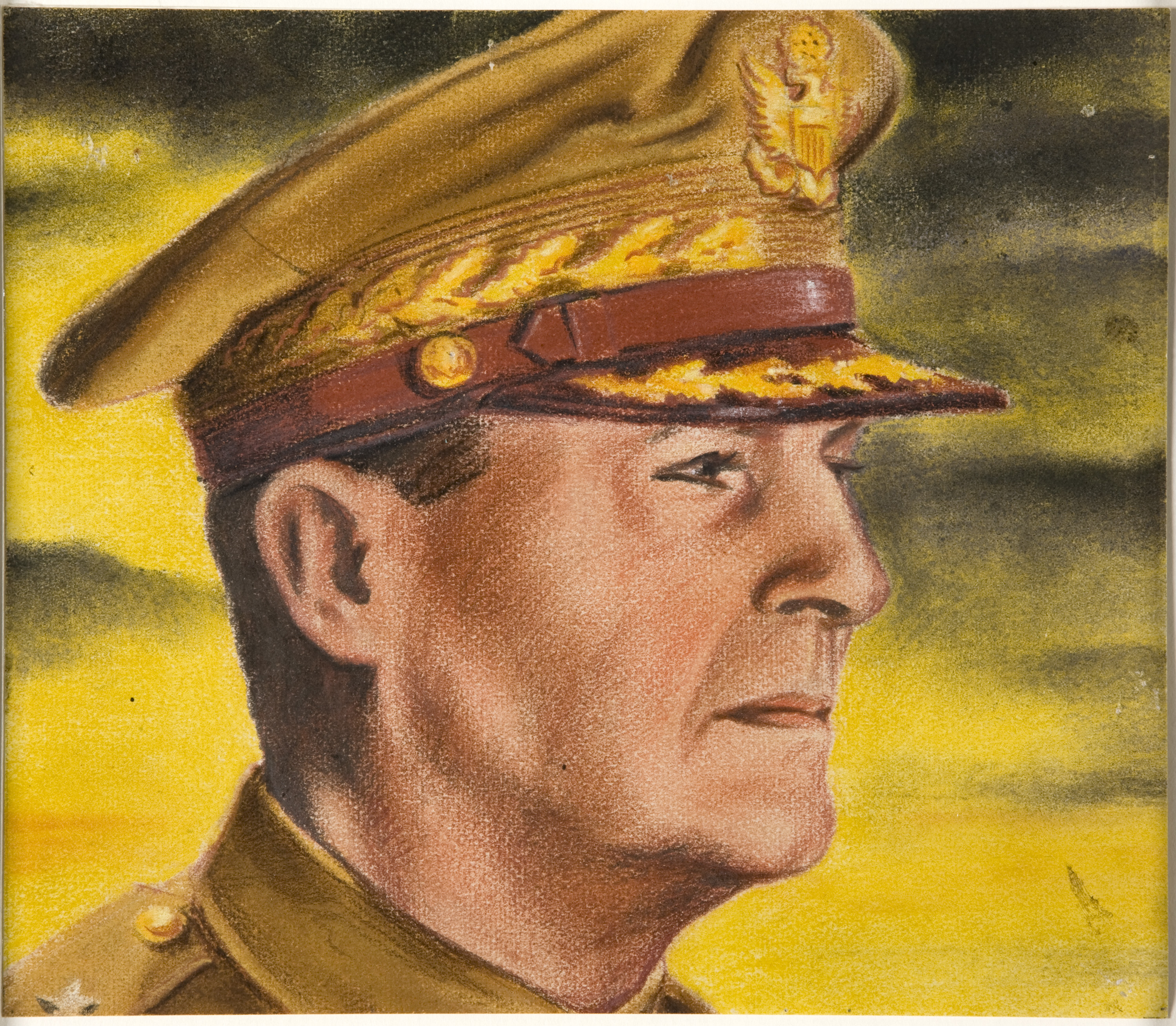
MacArthur, as the focus of U.S. war propaganda, became a symbol of Allied resistance to the Japanese

In getting the Philippine Army ready for war, MacArthur faced an enormous task. On a visit to the United States in 1937, MacArthur lobbied the Navy Department for the development of PT boats – small, fast boats armed with torpedoes – for which he believed that the geography of the Philippines, with its shallow waters and many coves, was ideally suited. The nascent Philippine Navy acquired three, known as "Q" boats, after President Manuel L. Quezon. In August 1941, the U.S. Navy created Motor Torpedo Boat Squadron Three, under the command of Lieutenant (junior grade) John D. Bulkeley. It was a half-strength squadron, with only six PT boats instead of the normal twelve, numbered 31 to 35 and 41. It arrived at Manila in September 1941. It was understood that a fleet consisting of more than PT boats would be required for a successful defense of the Philippines.

As early as 1907, U.S. naval and military planners had concluded that it would be impractical to repel an invasion of the Philippines. The best that could be hoped for was that the garrison could hold out on the Bataan peninsula until help arrived. In the 1920s it was estimated that they could do so for about 60 days. By the 1930s, in view of the increased capability of aircraft, the planners had become decidedly pessimistic that they could do so. By 1936 they were agreed that the Philippines should be written off. But in July 1941, this decision was abruptly reversed, and it became the policy of the U.S. government to defend and hold the Philippines. This was based, at least in part, in the belief that Boeing B-17 Flying Fortress bombers could deter or defeat an invading force.

Soon after the Japanese invasion of the Philippines had started in December 1941, MacArthur, in accordance with the pre-war plan, declared Manila an open city, and ordered his forces on Luzon to withdraw to Bataan. The Philippine government, the high commissioner's office and MacArthur's USAFFE headquarters moved to Corregidor Island. Although the dependants of U.S. military personnel had been sent back to the United States, MacArthur was, until his recall from retirement, a Philippine government employee, so his family had remained in the country. MacArthur's wife, Jean MacArthur, and young son, Arthur MacArthur IV, went with him to Corregidor. Arthur celebrated his fourth birthday on Corregidor, on 21 February 1942. When an aide asked about Arthur's possible fate, MacArthur replied: "He is a soldier's son."

Most of the United States Asiatic Fleet retired to the south of the Philippines. A small force was left behind under the command of Rear Admiral Francis W. Rockwell consisting of the submarine tender USS Canopus, the submarine rescue ship Pigeon, gunboats Oahu, Luzon and Mindanao, minesweepers Finch, Tanager and Quail, five tugboats, three small patrol boats, and the PT boats of Motor Torpedo Boat Squadron Three. The loss of Manila and the U.S. Naval Base Subic Bay meant that fuel and spare parts became scarce. The PT boats relied on Canopus and the floating dry dock USS Dewey for assistance with maintenance. Despite this, Motor Torpedo Boat Squadron Three continued to patrol. On 17 December, PT-32, PT-34 and PT-35 rescued 296 survivors from SS Corregidor, which had been carrying refugees to Australia when it struck a mine and sank in Manila Bay. A week later, PT-33 ran aground while patrolling south of Manila Bay, and was set on fire to prevent her being salvaged by the Japanese. PT-31 met a similar fate a month later, after its engines failed and it drifted onto a reef. The PT boats attacked enemy barges off Luzon on the night of 23 January 1942, a small Japanese warship on 1 February, and a small vessel, probably a fishing trawler, on 17 February.

== Decision to evacuate ==
In a message to President Franklin D. Roosevelt in Washington, D.C., on 11 February, MacArthur announced that he and his family intended to "share the fate of the garrison". This meant surrender at best; MacArthur knew that death from artillery fire or an air raid was also likely. Three days later, the Chief of Staff of the United States Army, General George C. Marshall, urged MacArthur to send his family away, but MacArthur ignored this part of the message. Singapore, once considered impregnable, fell on 15 February, and in Washington, the possibility that Corregidor would also fall and MacArthur would be taken prisoner was considered. MacArthur was America's most experienced general, but would be of little use in a prisoner of war camp. Moreover, he had become a living symbol of Allied resistance to the Japanese. The brave but doomed defense of Bataan had captured the imagination of the American public, who saw MacArthur as the only Allied general who knew how to fight the Japanese. Walter R. Borneman noted that:

in a fragile period of the American psyche when the general American public, still stunned by the shock of Pearl Harbor and uncertain what lay ahead in Europe, desperately needed a hero, they wholeheartedly embraced Douglas MacArthur – good press copy that he was. There simply were no other choices that came close to matching his mystique, not to mention his evocative lone-wolf stand – something that always resonated with Americans.

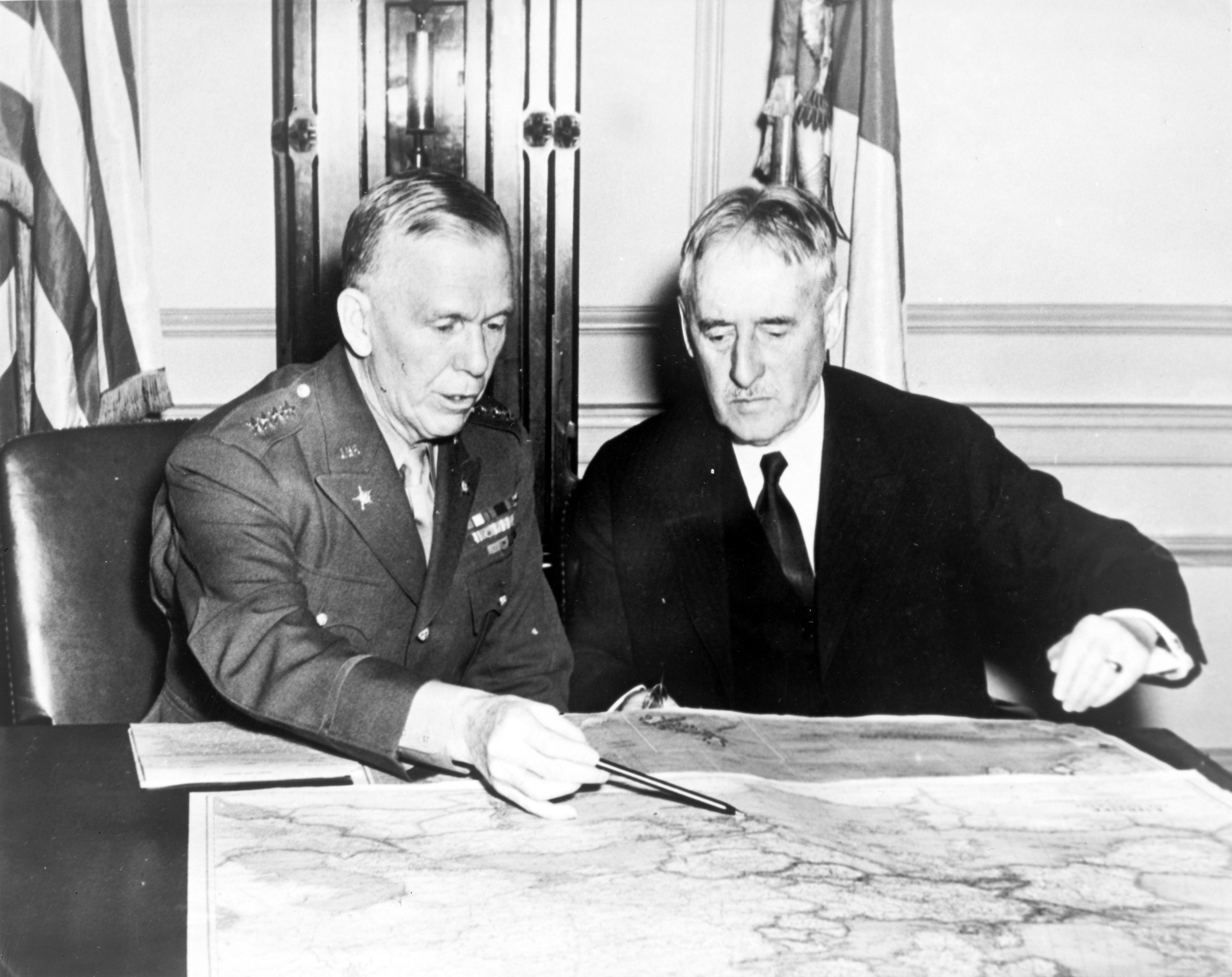
The Chief of Staff of the United States Army, General George C. Marshall (left), confers with the Secretary of War, Henry L. Stimson, in January 1942

Secretary of State Cordell Hull raised the possibility of MacArthur's evacuation. Brigadier General Dwight Eisenhower wrote in his diary:

I cannot help thinking that we are disturbed by editorials and reacting to "public opinion" rather than to military logic. "Pa" Watson is certain we must get MacArthur out, as being worth "five Army corps".

Roosevelt considered sending MacArthur to Mindanao to coordinate the defense of the Philippines from there, but another consideration arose. The fall of Singapore sealed the fate of the American-British-Dutch-Australian Command (ABDA), of which MacArthur's command was nominally a part. Discussions were held with the British about future command arrangements. A broad agreement was reached that the United States would assume responsibility for the Southwest Pacific. A senior American officer was required, and MacArthur was the obvious choice. On 23 February, MacArthur received a message that had been drafted by Roosevelt, Secretary of War Henry L. Stimson and Marshall. It read:

The President directs that you make arrangements to leave and proceed to Mindanao. You are directed to make this change as quickly as possible;... From Mindanao you will proceed to Australia where you will assume command of all United States troops;... Instructions will be given from here at your request for the movement of submarine or plane or both to enable you to carry out the foregoing instructions. You are authorized to take your chief of staff [Major] General [Richard K.] Sutherland.

MacArthur responded with a request that he might select the time of his departure. "Unless the right moment is chosen for this delicate operation", he wrote, "a sudden collapse might occur." "With regard to the actual movement", he went on, "I deem it advisable to go to Mindanao by combined use of surface craft and submarine, and thence by air, further movement by submarine being too time consuming." Marshall replied that Roosevelt would allow him to choose the time and method of his departure. ABDA was dissolved on 27 February, and MacArthur nominally came under Dutch command, but was ordered to continue communicating directly with the War Department.

MacArthur inspected the PT boat squadron on 1 March. With air cover provided by his four remaining Curtiss P-40 Warhawks, MacArthur and his wife Jean took a half-hour ride on PT-41. Although the sea was tranquil, Jean still felt queasy. Ostensibly, the purpose of MacArthur's visit was presenting Bulkeley with the Distinguished Service Cross for sinking an "unidentified 5,000-ton enemy ship with torpedoes without serious damage to his ship or casualty to his crew", but afterwards MacArthur took Bulkeley aside and asked him if it would be possible to make the 600-mile (970-kilometer) journey through uncharted waters at night in PT boats. Bulkeley told him that it would be "a piece of cake."

When some days passed without any further word on the matter, follow-up messages were sent on 6 and 9 March. By 10 March, MacArthur had decided that the Bataan front was not in danger of imminent collapse, and replied that he planned to depart on 15 March, when the submarine USS Permit was scheduled to arrive at Corregidor. Radio broadcasts in the United States calling for MacArthur to be placed in charge in Australia had been picked up by MacArthur's headquarters in Corregidor, and it had to be assumed that the Japanese had heard them too. There were ominous signs: Japanese surface patrols had been stepped up in the Subic Bay area, and there were reports of Japanese destroyers heading north from the southern Philippines. MacArthur therefore elected not to wait for the Permit, but to leave as soon as possible, by PT boat on the night of 11 March. Major General Jonathan M. Wainwright was left in command on Bataan and Corregidor. "When I get back", MacArthur told him, "if you're still on Bataan, I'll make you a lieutenant general." Wainwright replied: "I'll be on Bataan if I'm still alive."

Of the decision to depart by PT boat rather than wait for the submarine, Lieutenant Robert B. Kelly, executive officer of Motor Torpedo Boat Squadron Three, and commander of PT-34, later recalled:

Having served with Lieutenant Bulkeley as his second in command on this and a prior assignment, I was privy to much of what transpired during his conferences with General MacArthur during the decision making process. MacArthur's decision to use the PT boats for the evacuation of his party dramatically emphasized to the American public the overwhelming odds against which the United States was fighting in the Philippines. It evened an old score with the United States Navy. And since he had a tendency towards claustrophobia and did not relish making the trip on a submerged submarine with a commander whom he did not personally know, it provided an acceptable alternative which he elected to exercise.

== Escape ==
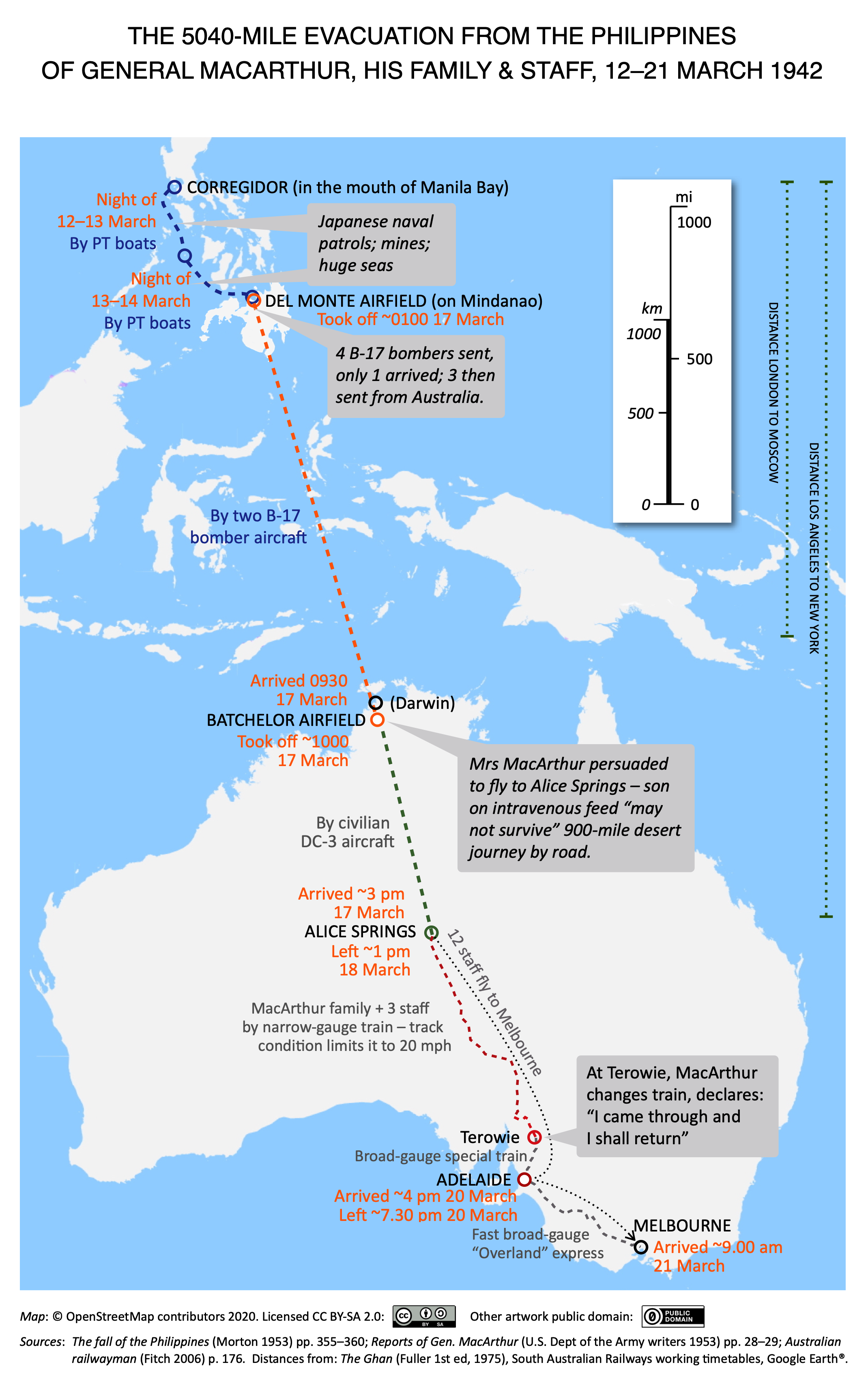
Route of the escape

=== Preparations ===
Bulkeley and his crews overhauled the PT boats for the voyage. All of the engines had performed hard war service, and had been operated for double the recommended mileage without overhaul. As a result, they were reduced to operating at half speed. Since there were no replacement parts, the gaskets, which normally would have been discarded, had to be carefully cleaned and replaced. Each PT boat would carry twenty 55-gallon drums of additional fuel on the deck. This reduced the top speed of the boats to about 30 knots (56 kilometers per hour; 35 miles per hour). To make room for the passengers, Bulkeley had to leave 32 of his men behind, who would be sent to fight as infantry on Bataan.

Sutherland, who was MacArthur's chief of staff, drew up the passenger lists. Rockwell and his chief of staff, Captain Herbert J. Ray, were ordered to accompany MacArthur. They were already under orders to return by submarine, but this was switched to accompanying MacArthur when his date of departure was brought forward. A United States Army Air Corps officer, Brigadier General Harold H. George, was included at the request of the United States Army Air Forces.

MacArthur was accompanied by his family: his wife Jean, four-year-old son Arthur, and Arthur's Cantonese amah, Loh Chui. MacArthur later defended his decision to take her instead of an American nurse. "Few people outside the Orient", he wrote, "know how completely a member of the family an amah can become, and Ah Cheu [sic] (Note: Loh Chui's name has been widely misquoted as "Ah Cheu" or "Ah Choo", an affectionate family name as used here by MacArthur.) had been with us since Arthur's birth. Because of her relationship to my family, her death would have been certain had she been left behind."

In case a doctor was needed, Major Charles H. Morhouse was summoned from Bataan to accompany the party. The remaining thirteen were members of MacArthur's staff, who were loyal and experienced; some had been with MacArthur for years. Creating a new staff in Australia would have taken time, while taking his existing one would enable him to commence work soon after arrival in Australia. They would be more valuable there than in the Philippines, where they would have been taken prisoner. Sutherland included two of his own men: his assistant, Lieutenant Colonel Francis H. Wilson, and his stenographer, Master Sergeant Paul P. Rogers. Promoted from private that day, Rogers was the only enlisted man on the list, which he typed. A number of men gave him letters to post.

Because there was no food for the passengers on the PT boats, Jean and MacArthur's aide-de-camp, Lieutenant Colonel Sidney L. Huff, packed tins of food into four duffel bags, one for each boat. Huff removed the four-star rank number plates from MacArthur's car so they could be used in Australia, and took a mattress for the MacArthurs to lie on. Stories later circulated that it was full of cash or gold. Other stories had it that furniture from MacArthur's residence in the Manila Hotel had been loaded on board the PT boats, even, in one version of the story, the piano. In fact, each passenger was limited to one piece of luggage weighing 35 pounds (16 kilograms) or less. Jean took a small suitcase with some clothes. It sported a label from the Hotel New Grand in Yokohama, where she stayed during her honeymoon. Loh Chui wrapped her possessions in a handkerchief. MacArthur took nothing.

The PT boats and passengers
Boat	Skipper	Other officers	Passengers
PT-32	Lieutenant (junior grade) Vince Schumacher	Ensign Cone Johnson	Brigadier General Spencer B. Akin, Brigadier General Hugh J. Casey, Brigadier General William F. Marquat, Brigadier General Harold H. George, Lieutenant Colonel Joe R. Sherr, Major Curtis L. Lambert
PT-34	Lieutenant Robert B. Kelly	Ensign Iliff D. Richardson	Rear Admiral Francis W. Rockwell, Brigadier General Richard J. Marshall, Colonel Charles P. Stivers, Captain Joseph McMicking
PT-35	Ensign Anthony B. Akers	Lieutenant (junior grade) Henry Brantingham, Ensign Bond Murray	Colonel Charles A. Willoughby, Lieutenant Colonel LeGrande A. Diller, Lieutenant Colonel Francis H. Wilson, Master Sergeant Paul P. Rogers
PT-41	Lieutenant John Bulkeley	Ensign George Cox	General Douglas MacArthur, Jean MacArthur, Arthur MacArthur IV, Loh Chui, Major General Richard K. Sutherland, Captain Herbert J. Ray, Lieutenant Colonel Sidney L. Huff, Major Charles H. Morhouse

=== By PT boat ===
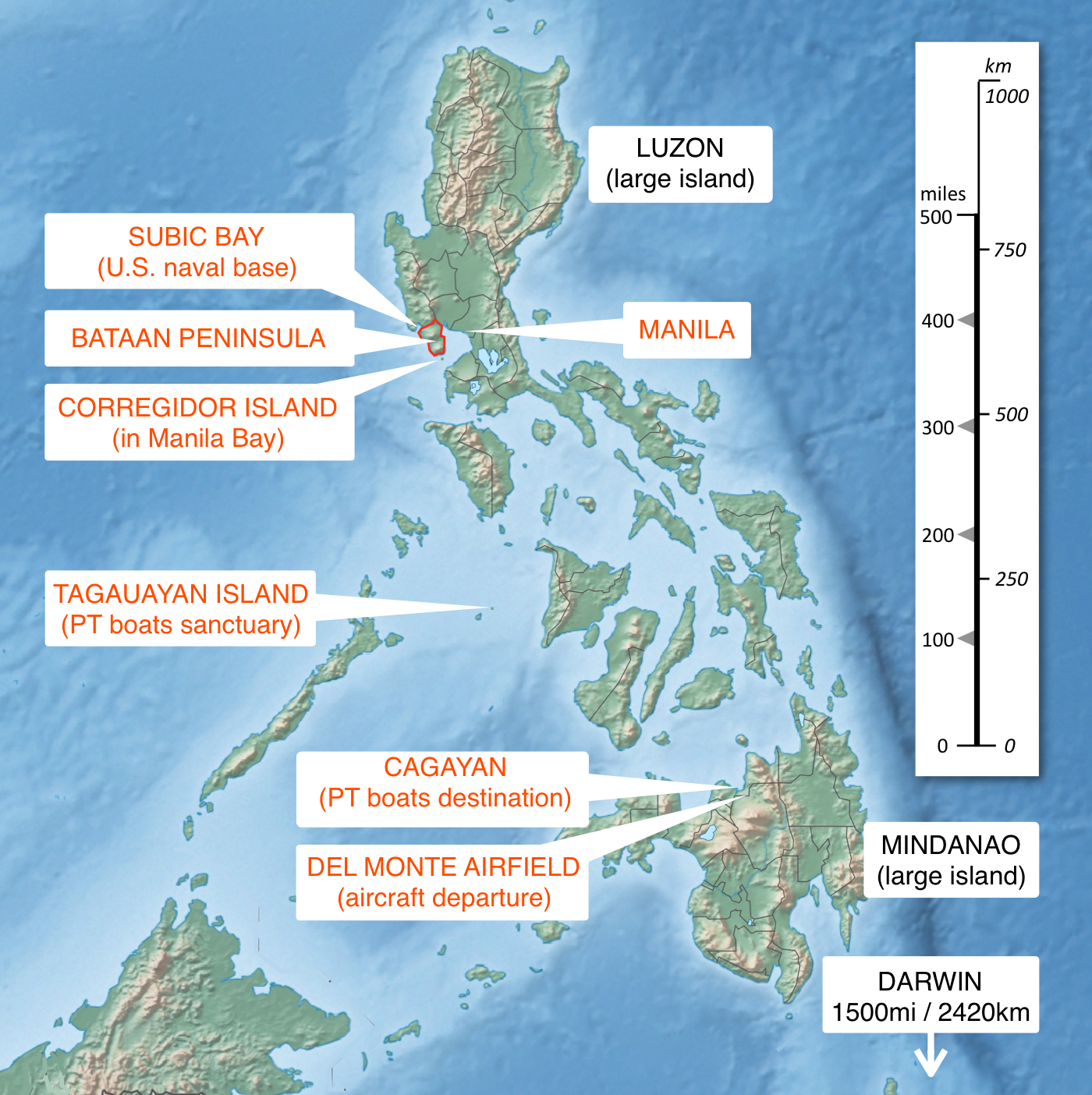
Key locations in the PT boat phase of the escape from the Philippines

Only PT-41, which carried MacArthur and his family, departed from Corregidor's North Dock. The passengers of the remaining boats were taken to Bataan in launches and boarded there. While his family boarded, MacArthur spoke to Major General George F. Moore, the commander of the Harbor Defenses of Manila and Subic Bays. "George", he told him, "keep the flag flying. I'm coming back."

PT-41 departed at 19:45 on 11 March and 15 minutes later joined the other three. A navy minelayer led the PT boats through the protective minefield in single file. The boats then assumed a diamond formation, with PT-41 in the lead and PT-34 bringing up the rear. If attacked by the Japanese, PT-41 was to flee while the other three boats engaged the enemy. The seas were moderate, but most of the passengers quickly became seasick. MacArthur later recalled:

The weather deteriorated steadily, and towering waves buffeted our tiny, war-weary, blacked-out vessels. The spray drove against our skin like stinging pellets of birdshot. We would fall into a trough, then climb up the steep water peak, only to slide down the other side. The boat would toss crazily back and forth, seeming to hang free in space as though about to breach, and would then break away and go forward with a rush. I recall describing the experience afterward as what it must be like to take a trip in a concrete mixer.

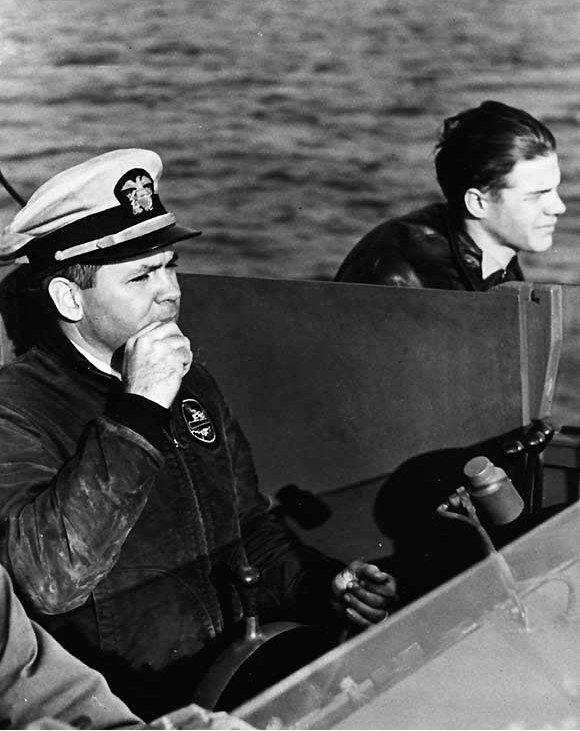
Lieutenant John D. Bulkeley (left) at the helm of a PT boat

During the night, the four boats became separated. Bulkeley spent time looking for the other three boats, but was unable to find them in the darkness. At dawn he gave up, and headed for one of the alternative hiding places. Kelly's PT-34 was the first to reach the rendezvous point, a cove on Tagauayan Island, two hours late at 09:30. There was no sign of the other boats, and Rockwell, in the same boat with Kelly, was far from convinced that Kelly had found the correct island. Some repairs were made, and the boat was refueled by hand pumps from the drums. Two men were posted atop the island's tallest hill to watch out for the Japanese and the other boats.

PT-32, which had only two good engines, had straggled behind the others. Around dawn, Schumacher spotted what appeared to be a Japanese destroyer heading towards him. He jettisoned his fuel drums so he could increase speed and run from it. He ordered his crew to man the .50-caliber machine guns and get ready to launch torpedoes. Akin prepared to toss a barracks bag filled with code books overboard. However, as the light improved, and the vessel drew closer, another look through the binoculars revealed that it was not a Japanese destroyer at all, but PT-41, carrying an angry Bulkeley. Schumacher was ordered to recover the drums he had jettisoned, but this proved to be a time-consuming task, and a dangerous one in broad daylight, and it had to be abandoned after only a few drums were recovered. Bulkeley had his gunners sink the rest. The two boats then hid for the day in a nearby cove.

In the afternoon, PT-41 and PT-32 made their way to Tagauayan, where they found PT-34. There was a discussion about whether to proceed to Mindanao, or wait for Permit. Bulkeley warned that the seas might even be higher. But, since there was no assurance that the submarine would make it, MacArthur decided to continue, departing in daylight at 18:00 so as to be sure to meet their air transport there. Since PT-32 had no fuel to make Mindanao, its passengers were divided between PT-41 and PT-34. Soon after they had departed, PT-35 belatedly arrived at the rendezvous point. Akers found the crew of PT-32 there, and discovered that the other two boats had been and gone. He therefore set out for Cagayan de Oro as well.

At 19:00, about an hour after they had left Tagauayan, PT-34 and PT-41 spotted a Japanese cruiser. Bulkeley made a sharp turn due west, and headed at top speed, about 20 knots (37 km/h; 23 mph), into the setting sun. Whether because of the high waves, the glare of the sun, or simple inattentiveness, the cruiser did not spot them. After midnight, the weather began to worsen, with heavy swells and sporadic squalls. Kelly later recalled:

Big foaming waves fifteen or twenty feet high thundering over the cockpit, drenching everybody. Our binoculars were full of water and our eyes so continuously drenched with stinging salt that we couldn't see, in addition to which it was pitch-black. We were making good speed through strange waters with islands all around us. We could see the outlines of the big ones – Negros and Mindanao – very dimly against the horizon through the storm. But there were dozens of small ones and probably hundreds of reefs.

You had to keep one hand in front of your eyes to avoid the slapping force of the water and yet you needed both to hold on.

The Admiral was pretty wrought up. "I've sailed every type of ship in the Navy except one of these MTBs", he shouted at me above the wind, "and this is the worst bridge I've ever been on. I wouldn't do duty on one of these for anything in the world – you can have them."

By dawn, the winds and swells had subsided, but the delay caused by the bad weather had slowed the two boats, and they now had to travel across the Mindanao Sea in daylight. Cagayan was sighted shortly after 06:30 on 13 March. Although PT-34 had led all the way from Tagauayan, Kelly now let Bulkeley take the lead, as he had the channel charts. PT-41 therefore pulled up at the wharf first, with MacArthur on the bow. They were met by Colonel William Morse, an officer on the staff of the Brigadier General William F. Sharp, the commander of U.S. forces on Mindanao. MacArthur told Bulkeley "I'm giving every officer and man here the Silver Star for gallantry. You've taken me out of the jaws of death, and I won't forget it."

A few hours later, PT-35 reached Cagayan. Willoughby later recalled:

We were behind schedule and reached the north coast of Mindanao in broad daylight. It was a clear, dazzling day. Fortunately, no Japanese planes cut across the blue sky, though the enemy was known to make regular mail flights from Mindanao to Luzon. We were pretty conspicuous as the hours dragged on.

USS Permit, under the command of Lieutenant Wreford G. Chapple, reached Tagauayan on 13 March, and found PT-32. With two of his three engines out of action, Schumacher felt that his boat was no longer seaworthy. He had Chapple destroy the boat with Permit's deck gun. Chapple then took the fifteen PT-32 crewmen back to Corregidor. There, eight of the crew were disembarked, while Chapple embarked forty more passengers, thirty-six of them codebreakers. Nonetheless, Chapple was ordered to conduct a regular war patrol, which he did. He finally reached Australia on 7 April. Unaware of this, Bulkeley attempted to locate PT-32. Over the next few days he flew over the area as a passenger in various aircraft, including a P-35 and a P-40, in the hope of finding it.

=== By aircraft ===
The commander of U.S. Army Forces in Australia, Lieutenant General George H. Brett, received a radiogram from General Marshall in Washington, D.C., alerting him that MacArthur would be requesting bombers to transport his party from Mindanao to Australia. A subsequent message from MacArthur requested his "most experienced pilots, and the best available planes in top condition", but the only long-range aircraft that Brett had were Boeing B-17 Flying Fortresses of the 19th Bombardment Group which had seen hard service in the Philippines and the Dutch East Indies campaigns. He therefore approached Vice Admiral Herbert F. Leary, the commander of naval forces in the Anzac Area, to ask for a loan of some of twelve newly arrived Navy B-17s. Leary, who had a reputation for refusing requests unless he could see how the Navy would benefit, turned Brett down.

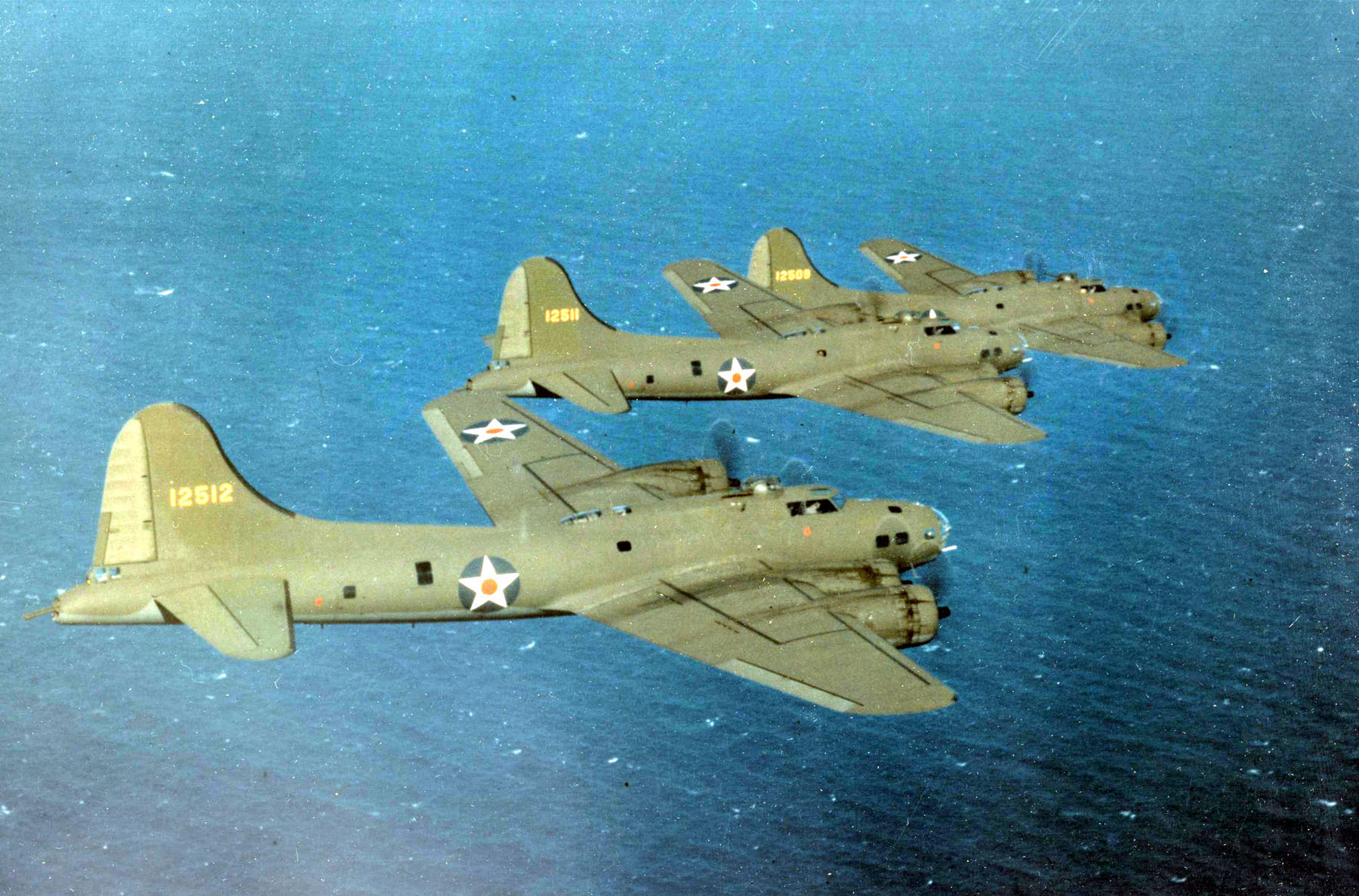
Boeing B-17E Flying Fortresses; two of them flew MacArthur and his party from Mindanao to Australia's north coast

Brett sent four of the 19th Bombardment Group's old planes. Two were forced to turn back with engine trouble. One of the others accidentally dumped 300 US gallons (1,100 litres; 250 imperial gallons) of its fuel. The pilot flew on, and nearly made it to Del Monte Field, but just a few miles from his destination, the fuel tanks ran dry and the engines stopped; the B-17 crash landed in the sea. Two of the crew were killed, but the rest reached the shore, thence to Del Monte Field. Only one B-17, piloted by Lieutenant Harl Pease, reached Del Monte, and this B-17 was in poor condition, with failed brakes and a faulty supercharger. Sharp ordered it back to Australia before MacArthur arrived. Despite the inoperative brakes, Pease made the return trip, carrying sixteen passengers.

Thus, with the arrival of PT-35, all of MacArthur's group had reached Mindanao safely, but there were no aircraft at Del Monte Field to meet them. They were taken to the Del Monte Plantation, where they were lodged in the guest houses and had breakfast in the clubhouse. MacArthur sent a couple of sharp messages to Brett in Melbourne and Marshall in Washington. On their second day there, a Filipino woman arrived who wanted to speak to MacArthur. Her son was fighting on Luzon, and she had walked 25 miles (40 kilometers) in the hope that the general would have some news about him. He did not, but the fact that she was aware of MacArthur's presence was disturbing to the party, since the Japanese were only 30 miles (48 km) away at Davao on the south coast of Mindanao.

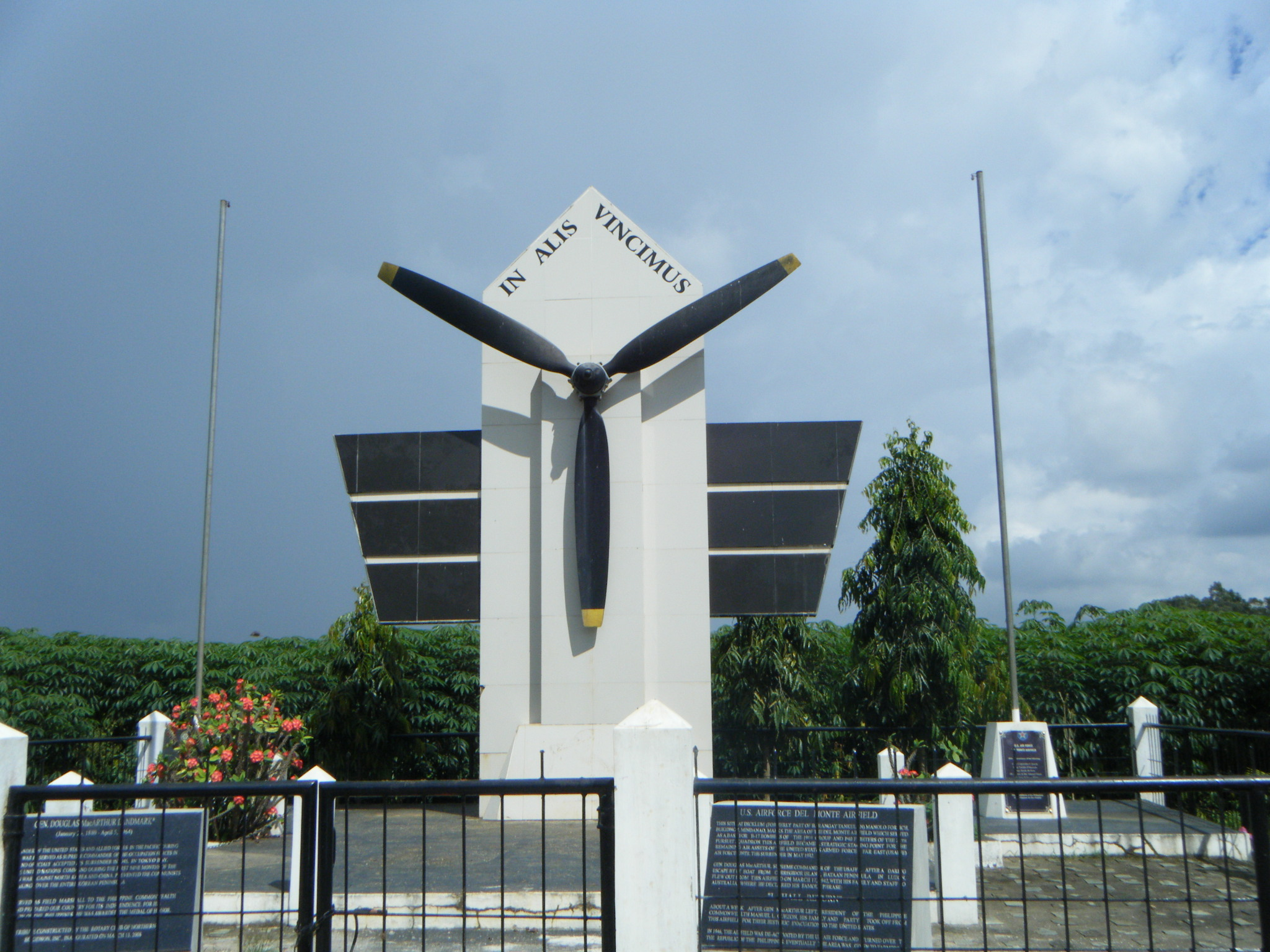
MacArthur evacuation memorial at the site of the Del Monte Field, Manolo Fortich, Bukidnon, Philippines, bearing the inscription In alis vincimus (On wings we conquer)

Brett went back to Leary, expecting to be turned down again, but this time, Leary gave Brett the aircraft he wanted. "Perhaps", Brett speculated, "Leary had heard from Washington". The newly formed 40th Reconnaissance Squadron crewed the bombers. One B-17 turned back, but two reached Del Monte Field on 16 March, landing in the dark on a runway lit by flares. Lieutenant Frank P. Bostrom, the pilot of the first plane, calculated that everyone could be carried in just two planes if they left most of their baggage behind. They split into two groups and the two bombers took off at 01:30 on 17 March. MacArthur rode in the radio operator's seat, which did not need to be manned as the aircraft were travelling under radio silence. For most of the passengers, the trip was dark and cold, with only a blanket between them and the metal skin of the aircraft.

The two B-17s flew to Batchelor Airfield, south of Darwin, where they touched down at 09:30. MacArthur awarded Silver Stars to the crews of the two bombers. Brett's chief of staff, Brigadier General Ralph Royce, was on hand to greet them; he had sent two Australian National Airways DC-3s to take them to Melbourne. However, Jean now refused to fly any further, so MacArthur asked for a motorcade to take them to the nearest railway station. Morhouse told MacArthur that since Arthur, who had suffered badly from seasickness and airsickness, was on an intravenous feed, he could not guarantee that the boy would survive the 800 miles (1,300 km) trip along an unsealed desert road to Alice Springs. MacArthur then agreed to take the planes to Alice Springs.

=== By train ===
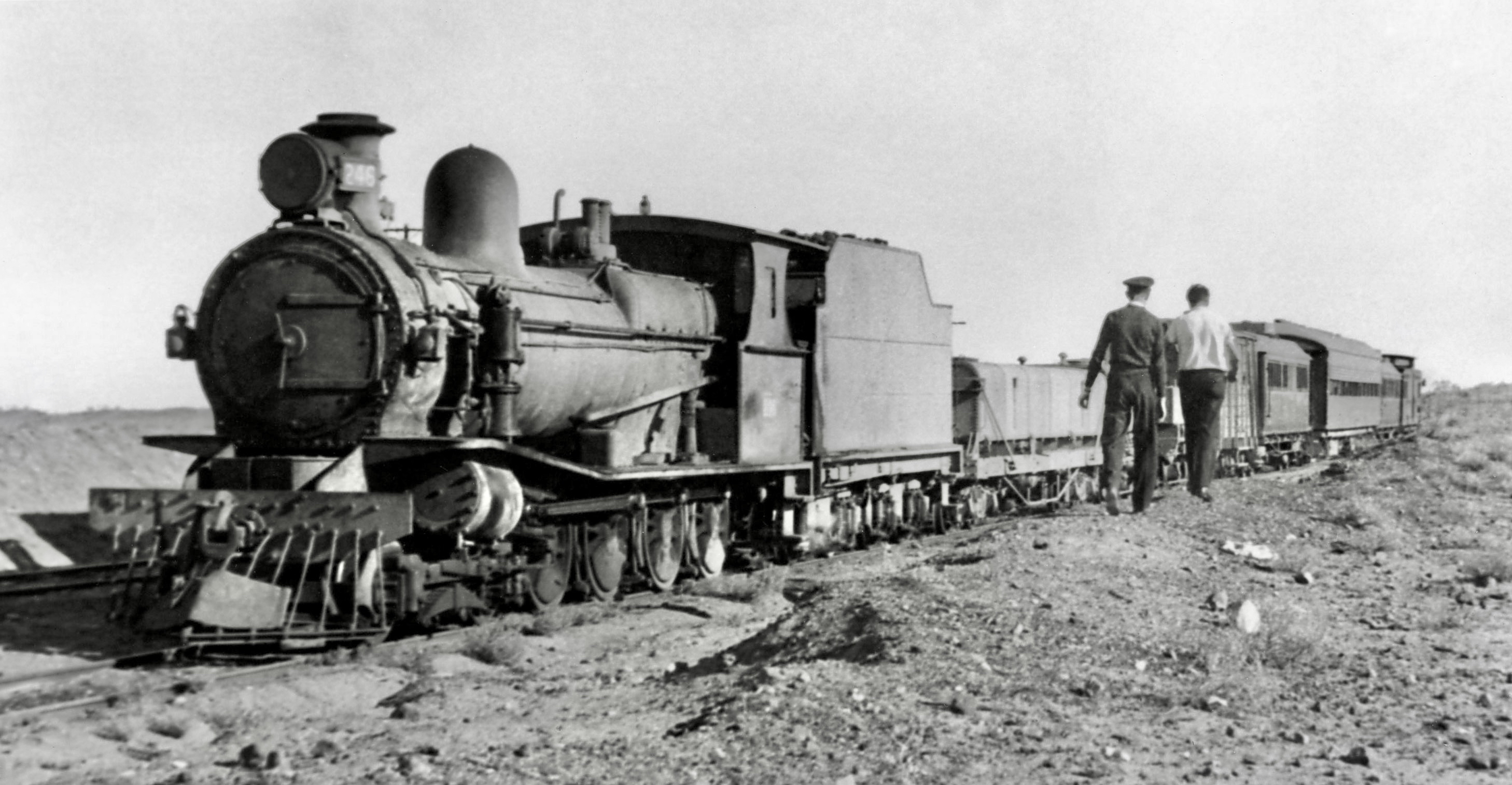
The MacArthurs' hurriedly dispatched train during a pause on the Central Australia Railway

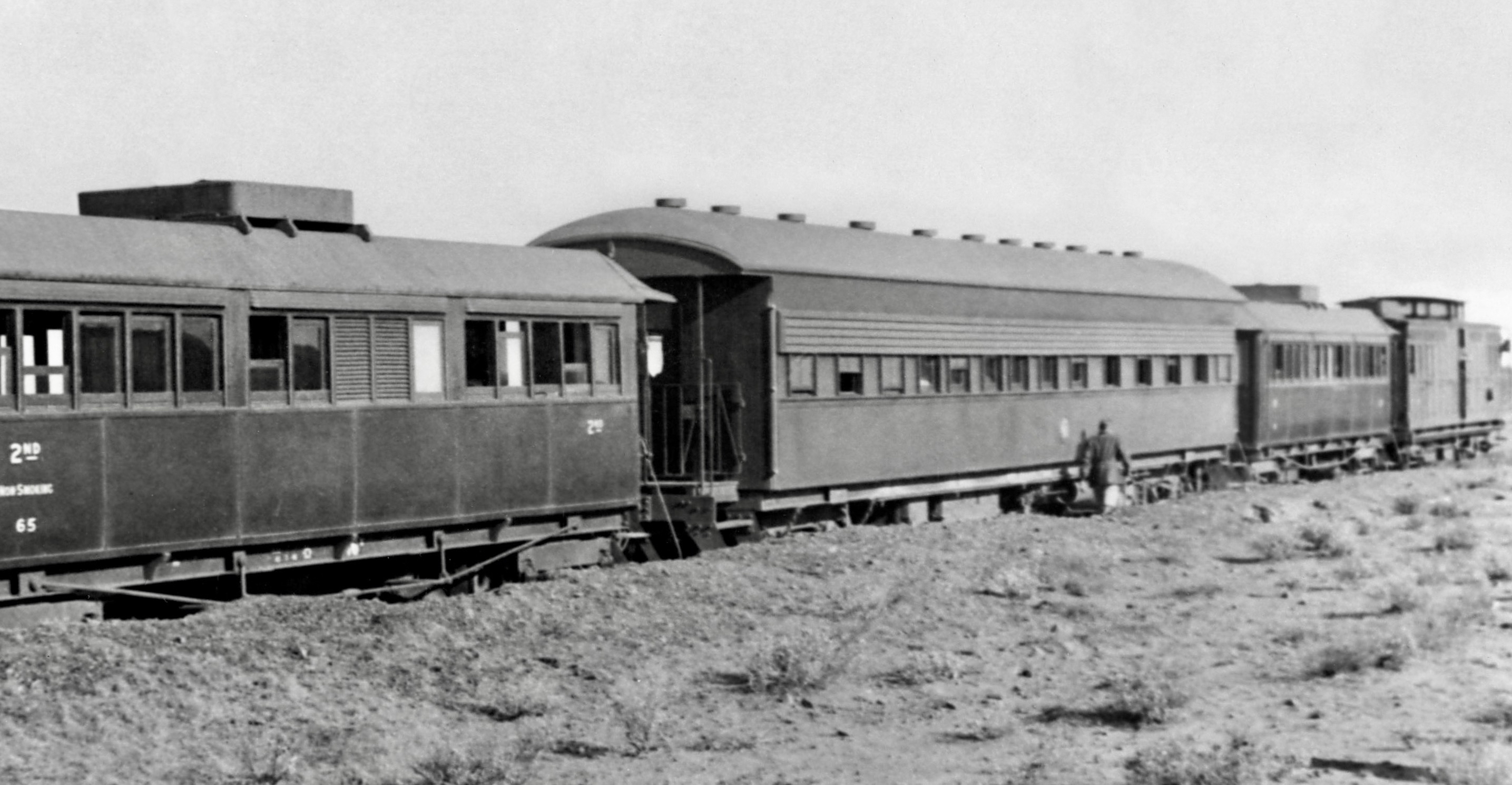
The sleeping car and other cars at the rear of the train

From Alice Springs, twelve of MacArthur’s staff flew the remaining 1,200 miles (1,900 km) to Melbourne via Adelaide in the DC-3 aircraft. The weekly passenger train having left Alice Springs the day before, railwaymen cobbled together a seven-car train (Note: The relatively large sleeping car in the middle of the train was for the MacArthurs and senior officers in their party. Two smaller passenger cars in front and behind it were used for makeshift dining and sleeping or sitting up on longitudinal seats. At the front of the train were two tank cars containing water for the locomotive, and a cattle car with an onboard Army field cooker. At the rear was a brake van (caboose with two passenger compartments).) for MacArthur, his family, Sutherland, Morhouse and Huff to take them southwards on the Central Australia Railway. A sleeping car, sent from the south, was picked up from a siding on the way. Two Australian sergeants were aboard to serve meals; an army nurse undertook the housekeeping. To reach the dining or sleeping car, passengers had to wait until the locomotive stopped, then get off and walk along the train. But there were many stops, and the train often had to lay over in crossing loops because opposing it on the single track were trains conveying supplies and men to the north. It took 48 hours of traveling at no more than 20 miles per hour (32 kilometers per hour) before the party disembarked from their "ancient conveyance", on the morning of 20 March, at Terowie where all traffic, passengers and freight alike, had to change to broad-gauge trains.

Having thought his whereabouts would have been secret, MacArthur was alarmed to find crowds, a military guard of honor and reporters waiting for his 2 pm arrival. The reporters' expectations of a briefing were unmet: he simply said that his policy during operations was to limit himself completely to the briefest publicity and to confine such statements to general releases from his headquarters. He followed briefly with the reason he was in Australia and concluded with a catchphrase that both alluded to his perilous journey and embodied his single-minded focus on liberating the Philippines that became widely publicized during the next three years: "I came through and I shall return".

MacArthur's simple declaration, "I came through and I shall return", was to be the slogan repeated many times during the following three years as he pursued his goal of regaining the Philippines. This was partly due to the efforts of the U.S. Office of War Information (OWI): soon, American submarines provided Filipino guerrillas with cartons of buttons, chewing gum, playing cards and matchboxes bearing the message, and they were widely circulated. (Note: The declaration has been widely misquoted as "I came out of Bataan and I shall return", including on the commemorative plaque at Terowie railway station.) Its originator, Filipino journalist Carlos Romulo, had proposed "We shall return", which Major General Sutherland had passed on to MacArthur. Later, after MacArthur had used the singular, the OWI proposed changing it to the plural. By then, however, Romulo was opposed to a reversion: "America has let us down and won't be trusted, but the people still have confidence in MacArthur. If he says he is coming back, he will be believed." MacArthur refused to change anyway. His critics cited it as an example of his megalomania. One history later opined that his "Caesaresque words" left "rather an ashen taste in the mouths of the men who knew they would be called on to return somewhat in advance of him."

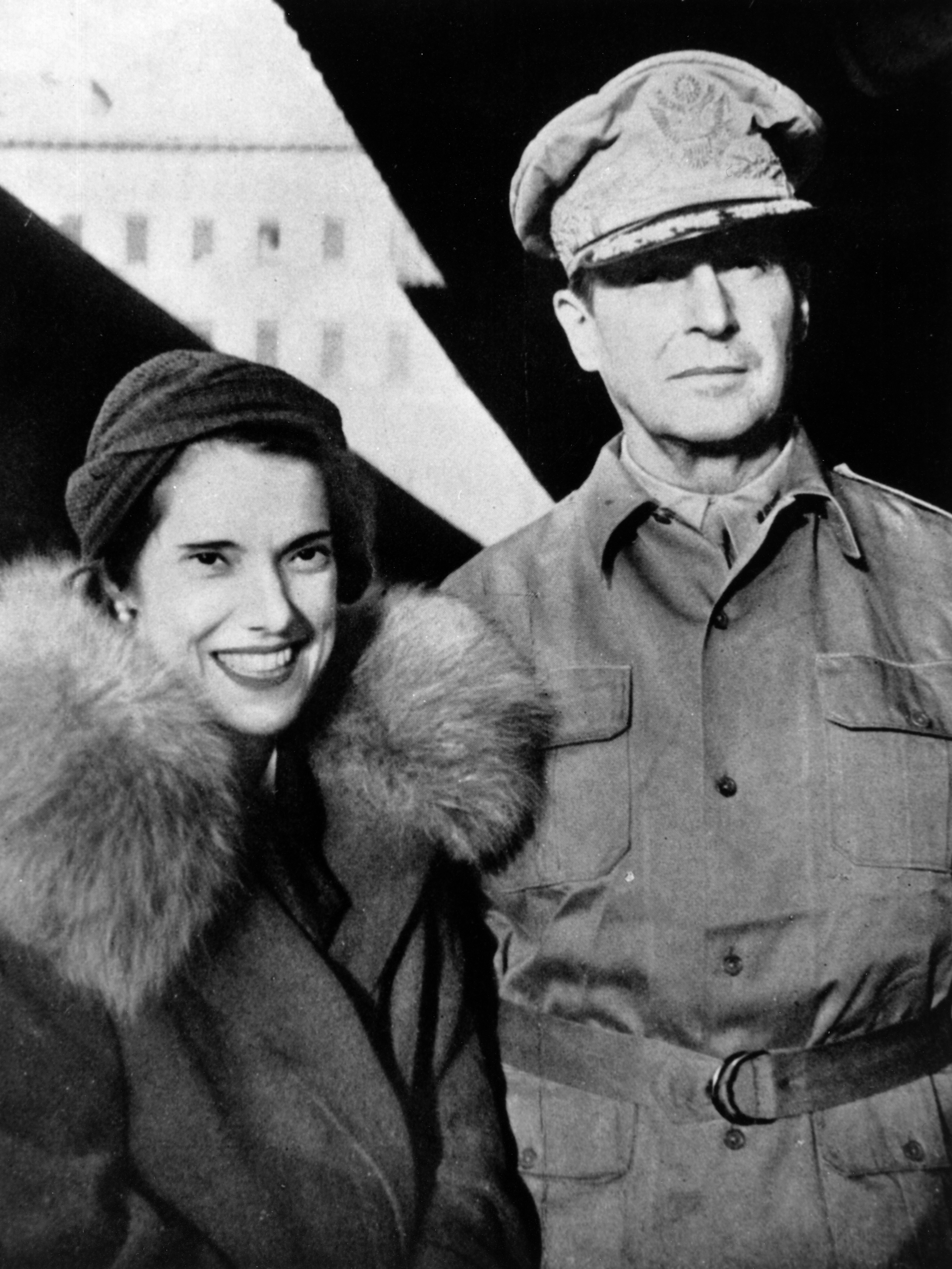
General and Mrs MacArthur at Adelaide railway station, 20 March 1942

The new train for the 150 miles (240 km) journey to Adelaide through a cooler, grassy region of South Australia was more commodious and, as a special movement, much faster. Comfort was incomparably better, since the South Australian Railways Commissioner had included his personal carriage, normally used for inspections, in the train hurriedly prepared for the party. Somewhat refreshed but still greatly fatigued, the family arrived in Adelaide in the late afternoon, to be met on the platform at the Adelaide railway station by senior U.S. and Australian army officers, diplomats and local dignitaries. The carriages, including the Commissioner's carriage at the back, departed for Melbourne at 7:30 pm attached to The Overland express.

At 9 am on 21 March, MacArthur's journey ended when his train arrived at Melbourne's Spencer Street station, where he was greeted by the Australian Minister for the Army, Frank Forde.

== Aftermath ==
Roosevelt issued a public statement on 17 March:

I know that every man and woman in the United States admires with me General MacArthur's determination to fight to the finish with his men in the Philippines. But I also know that every man and woman is in agreement that all important decisions must be made with a view toward the successful termination of the war. Knowing this, I am sure that every American, if faced individually with the question as to where General MacArthur could best serve his country, could come to only one answer.

On Bataan, the reaction to MacArthur's escape was mixed, with many American and Filipino troops feeling bitter and betrayed. When Wainwright broke the news to his generals "they were all at first depressed by the news... But I soon saw that they understood just as I understood." Some people with family members in the Philippines were dismayed. One wrote to Roosevelt that "Nothing you could have done would have broken their morale and that of their parents at home so thoroughly". Wainwright held out on Corregidor until 6 May. To Joseph Goebbels, MacArthur was a "fleeing general", while Benito Mussolini labeled him a coward. Marshall decided that the best way to counter this was to award MacArthur the Medal of Honor.

MacArthur nominated Bulkeley for the Medal of Honor, but the Commander in Chief, U.S. Fleet, Admiral Ernest King, was not going to let MacArthur award the Medal of Honor to a naval officer, so he wrote a citation for Bulkeley on behalf of the Navy. Roosevelt presented it to Bulkeley in a ceremony in the Oval Office on 4 August 1942.

The staff that MacArthur took with him from Corregidor formed the nucleus of General Headquarters Southwest Pacific Area. The "Bataan Gang", as they came to be called, remained with MacArthur for the duration, and were noted for their fanatical loyalty to him.

MacArthur eventually kept his promise, and returned to the Philippines. The Bataan Gang returned to Corregidor in March 1945 on four PT boats.

The flag flown on the PT boat that MacArthur escaped Corregidor on resides in the library of his high school alma mater, TMI Episcopal (formerly known as the Texas Military Institute).
