= Robert Kelly (naval officer) =

United States Navy officer (1913–1989)

Robert Bolling Kelly
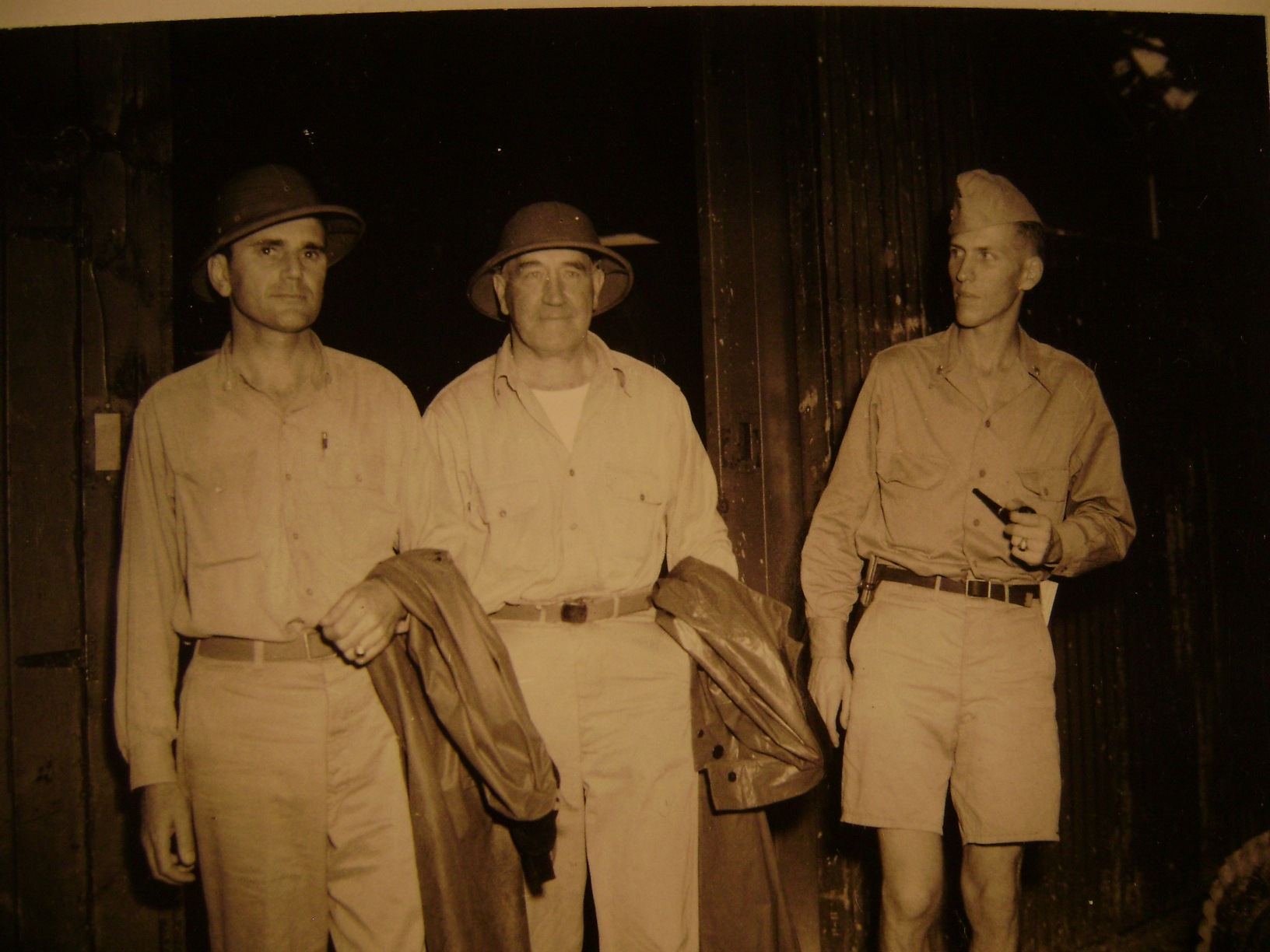
- (L-R) Cdr. W.R. Specht, Commodore Edward 'Mike' Moran, and LCdr. R.B. Kelly at Rendova, May 1944
- Born: June 9, 1913; New York City
- Died: January 23, 1989 (aged 75); Columbia, Maryland
- Military career
- Allegiance: United States
- Branch: United States Navy
- Service years: 1935–1961
- Rank: Captain
- Commands: Motor Torpedo Boat PT-34; Motor Torpedo Boat Squadron 9; USS Irwin (DD-794); USS Atka (AGB-3); USS Shenandoah (AD-26)
- Conflicts: World War II
- Awards: Navy Cross; Distinguished Service Cross; Silver Star with gold star; Legion of Merit

Captain Robert Bolling Kelly (June 9, 1913 – January 23, 1989) was an officer of the United States Navy who served during World War II.

== Biography ==
Kelly was born in New York City, and graduated from the U.S. Naval Academy at Annapolis in 1935.

=== World War II ===
In 1941–42 Lieutenant Kelly served as both Executive Officer of Motor Torpedo Boat Squadron 3 under Lieutenant John D. Bulkeley, and as commander of Motor Torpedo Boat PT-34, based in the Philippines.

Kelly took part in the operation to evacuate General Douglas MacArthur and his staff from Corregidor to Mindanao, on the night of March 12–13, 1942 and was subsequently awarded the Silver Star.

On the night of April 8–9, 1942 Bulkeley in PT-41 and Kelly in PT-34 engaged the Kuma off Cebu Island, firing several torpedoes, only one of which hit, but failed to explode. The next morning PT-34 was attacked by Japanese aircraft, forced to beach and then destroyed. Kelly, who was wounded in the action, was awarded the Navy Cross and the Distinguished Service Cross for "distinguished conduct and extraordinary courage in combat."

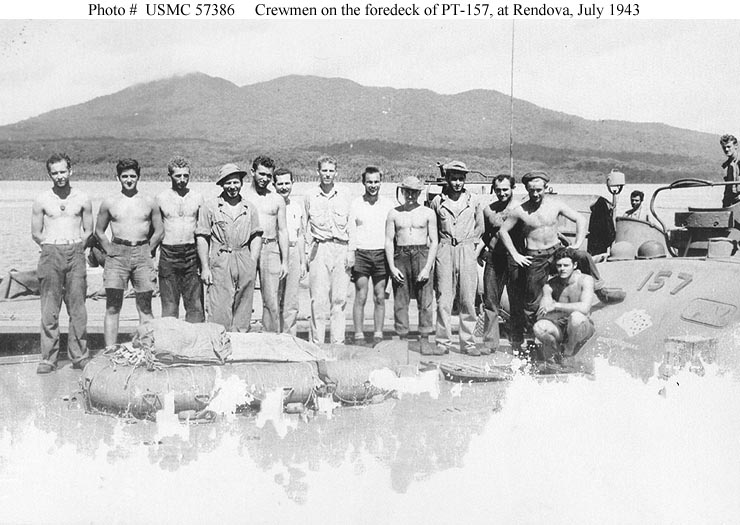
Lt. Cdr. Kelly (center) with the crew of PT-157 at Rendova, 1943

Kelly commanded Motor Torpedo Boat Squadron 9 in 1943–44, and earned another Silver Star for his actions during the New Georgia and Bougainville Campaigns.

With the rank of commander, Kelly commanded the destroyer Irwin (DD-794) from June 1945 until her decommissioning on May 31, 1946, seeing action during the battle of Okinawa, and being awarded the Legion of Merit.

=== Post-war career ===
Kelly commanded the icebreaker Atka (AGB-3) between 1950 and 1956 and the destroyer tender Shenandoah (AD-26) in 1958–59.

Kelly retired in 1961 with the rank of captain. He worked for the Aerospace Division of Martin Marietta, and later as a counselor of vocational rehabilitation for the State of Maryland.

Kelly died of pneumonia at Howard County General Hospital in Columbia, Maryland, and is buried in Arlington National Cemetery.

== In media ==
MTB Squadron 3's exploits in the Philippines in 1941–42 were portrayed in the 1942 book They Were Expendable by William L. White, and the 1945 film of the same name, in which the character of "Rusty Ryan", played by John Wayne, was based on Kelly.
