= USS Meyer =

Clemson-class destroyer

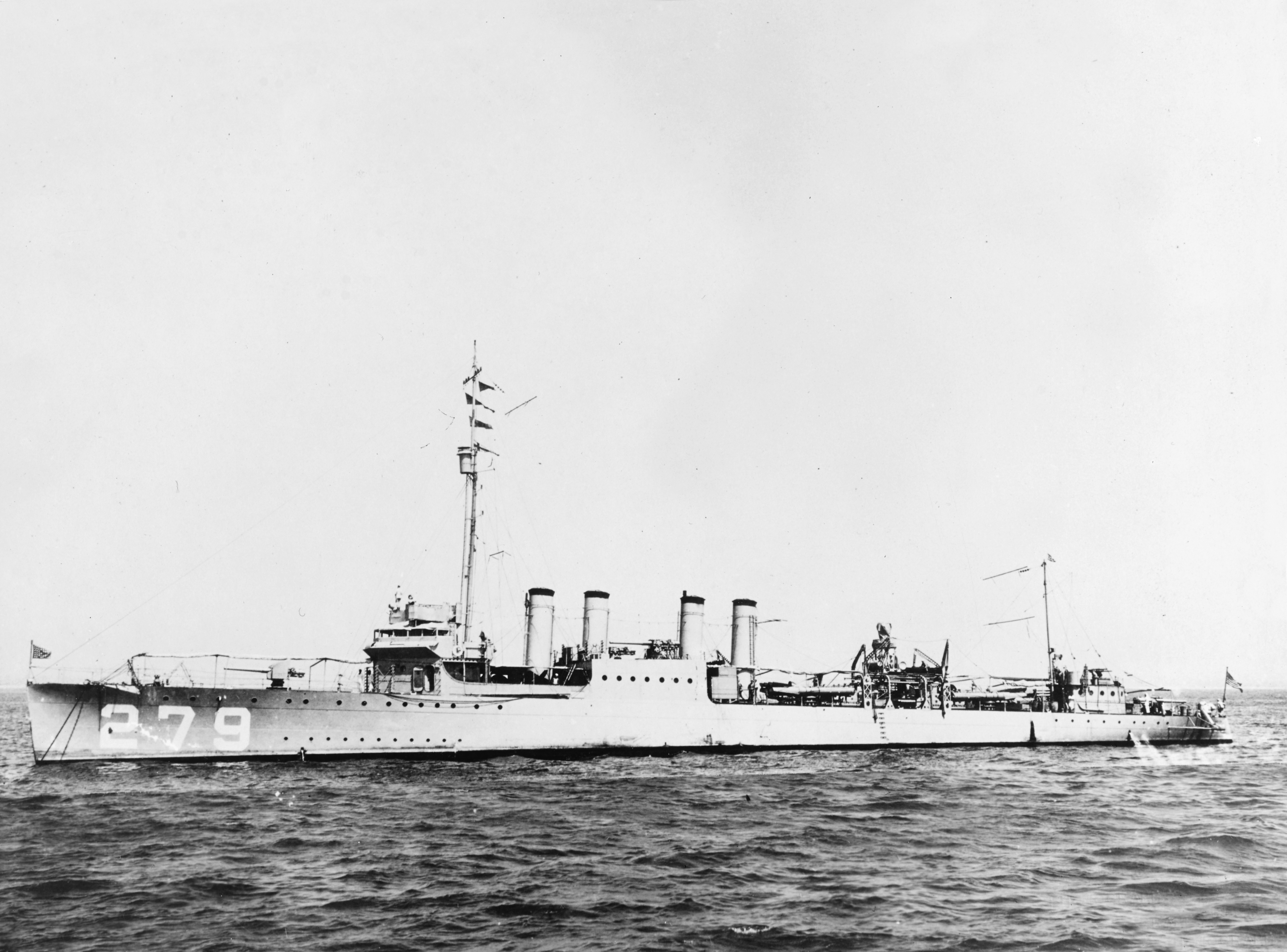

History

United States
- Namesake: George von Lengerke Meyer
- Builder: Bethlehem Shipbuilding Corporation, Squantum Victory Yard
- Laid down: 6 February 1919
- Launched: 18 July 1919
- Commissioned: 17 December 1919
- Decommissioned: 15 May 1929
- Stricken: 25 November 1930
- Fate: Sold for scrap, 25 February 1932

General characteristics
- Class & type: Clemson-class destroyer
- Displacement: 1,290 long tons (1,311 t) (standard); 1,389 long tons (1,411 t) (deep load)
- Length: 314 ft 4 in (95.8 m)
- Beam: 30 ft 11 in (9.42 m)
- Draught: 10 ft 3 in (3.1 m)
- Installed power: 27,000 shp (20,000 kW); 4 water-tube boilers
- Propulsion: 2 shafts, 2 steam turbines
- Speed: 35 knots (65 km/h; 40 mph) (design)
- Range: 2,500 nautical miles (4,600 km; 2,900 mi) at 20 knots (37 km/h; 23 mph) (design)
- Complement: 6 officers, 108 enlisted men
- Armament: 4 × single 4-inch (102 mm) guns; 2 × single 1-pounder AA guns or; 2 × single 3-inch (76 mm) guns; 4 × triple 21 inch (533 mm) torpedo tubes; 2 × depth charge rails

USS Meyer (DD-279) was a Clemson-class destroyer built for the United States Navy during World War I.

== Description ==
The Clemson class was a repeat of the preceding Wickes class although more fuel capacity was added. The ships displaced 1,290 long tons (1,311 t) at standard load and 1,389 long tons (1,411 t) at deep load. They had an overall length of 314 feet 4 inches (95.8 m), a beam of 30 feet 11 inches (9.4 m) and a draught of 10 feet 3 inches (3.1 m). They had a crew of 6 officers and 108 enlisted men.

Performance differed radically between the ships of the class, often due to poor workmanship. The Clemson class was powered by two steam turbines, each driving one propeller shaft, using steam provided by four water-tube boilers. The turbines were designed to produce a total of 27,000 shaft horsepower (20,000 kW) intended to reach a speed of 35 knots (65 km/h; 40 mph). The ships carried a maximum of 371 long tons (377 t) of fuel oil which was intended gave them a range of 2,500 nautical miles (4,600 km; 2,900 mi) at 20 knots (37 km/h; 23 mph).

The ships were armed with four 4-inch (102 mm) guns in single mounts and were fitted with two 1-pounder guns for anti-aircraft defense. In many ships a shortage of 1-pounders caused them to be replaced by 3-inch (76 mm) guns. Their primary weapon, though, was their torpedo battery of a dozen 21 inch (533 mm) torpedo tubes in four triple mounts. They also carried a pair of depth charge rails. A "Y-gun" depth charge thrower was added to many ships.

== Construction and career ==
Meyer, named for George von Lengerke Meyer, was laid down 6 February 1919 at the Bethlehem Shipbuilding Corporation, Squantum, Massachusetts; launched 18 July 1919; sponsored by Mrs. C. R. P. Rodgers, daughter of Mr. Meyer; and commissioned 17 December 1919.

After an east coast shakedown, Meyer departed Boston, Massachusetts 9 February 1920 for the west coast. She arrived San Diego, California 1 April only to depart soon afterward for a cruise to San Francisco, California and various Alaskan ports. Returning to San Diego 18 August, she continued to operate along the west coast, ranging from Alaska to Panama, with occasional voyages to Hawaii, for the next 8 and a half years. During that time her assignments were varied and in August, 1927, Meyer served as one of the ships used to assist pilots participating in the Dole Race from the mainland to Hawaii. Early in 1929 the destroyer began inactivation overhaul and on 15 May 1929 was decommissioned at San Diego. On 17 June she was towed to Mare Island for scrapping. Struck 25 November 1930, her materials were sold 25 February 1932.

As of 2019, no other ships have been named Meyer.

Meyer can be briefly seen in the movie, "Tin Pan Alley", just after the two male leads enlist in the army to serve in WW1. About 1 hour 15 mins into the film. She also appeared briefly in "Yankee Doodle Dandy" during the World War I time period.
