= Francis W. Rockwell (admiral) =

Vice admiral in the US Navy (1886–1979)

Francis Warren Rockwell
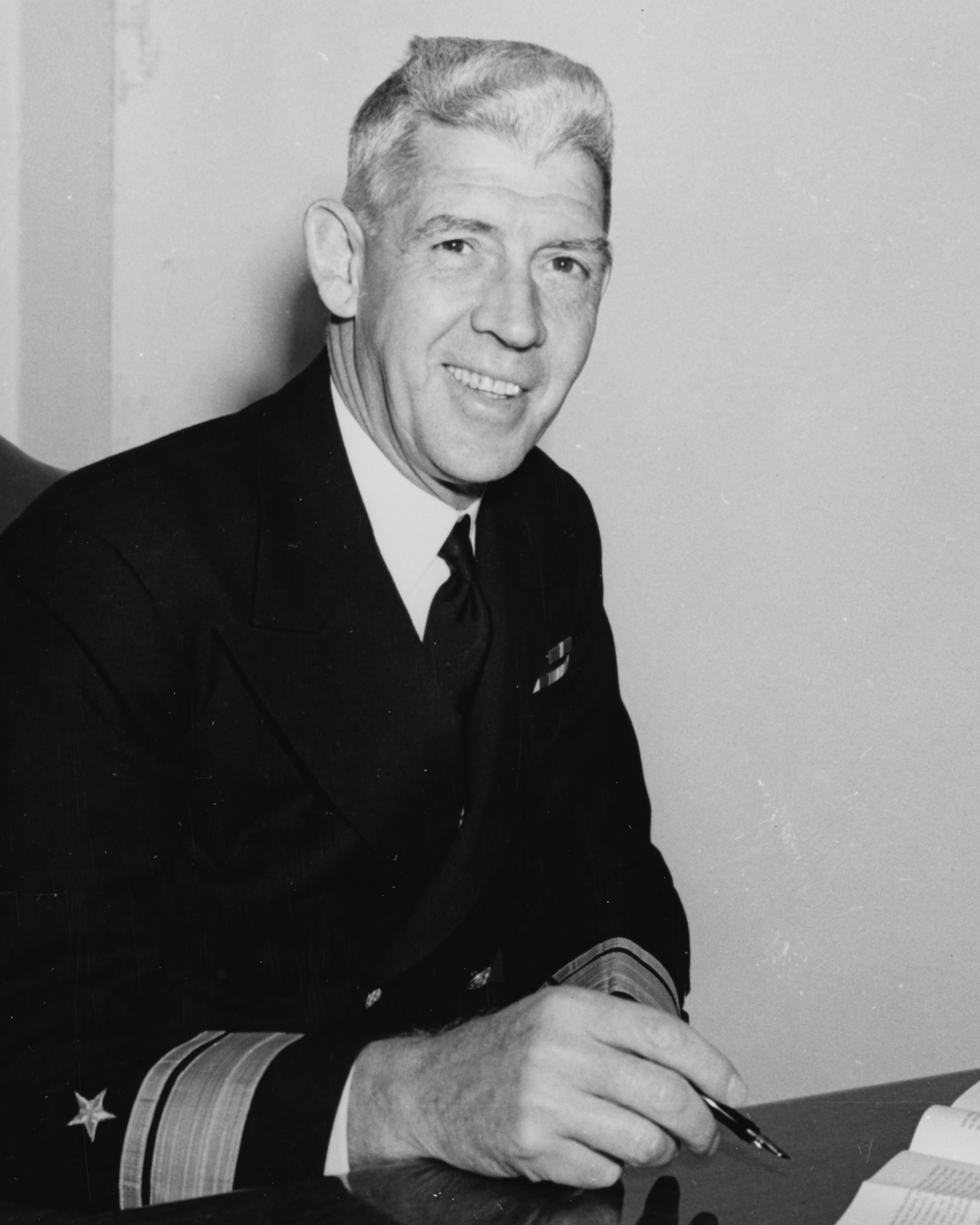
- Francis W. Rockwell in 1942
- Born: July 2, 1886; South Woodstock, Connecticut, U.S.
- Died: January 2, 1979 (aged 92); Saint Simons Island, Glynn County, Georgia, U.S.
- Military career
- Allegiance: United States of America
- Branch: United States Navy
- Service years: 1908–1948
- Rank: Vice Admiral
- Commands: USS Winslow (DD-53); USS Thatcher (DD-162); USS Robert Smith (DD-324); USS Dorsey (DD-117); USS Nevada (BB-36); 16th Naval District; Atlantic Fleet, Amphibious Training Command
- Conflicts: World War I World War II
- Awards: Navy Cross; Navy Distinguished Service Medal; Silver Star

Francis Warren Rockwell (July 2, 1886 – January 2, 1979) was a vice admiral in the United States Navy who served from 1908 to 1948.

== Early life and career ==
Rockwell was born in South Woodstock, Connecticut. He entered the Naval Academy in 1904, graduated in 1908, and was commissioned as an ensign on June 6, 1910. After various assignments before and after his commissioning, he directed the fitting out of the destroyer Jarvis (DD-38) in 1912-1914. In 1914 he joined the faculty of the Naval Academy as an instructor in electrical engineering and physics, serving there until 1917 when the United States entered World War I.

== World War I and interwar years ==
Rockwell served aboard the battleship New Jersey (BB-16) and aboard various destroyers in Queenstown, Ireland, during the war. He commanded Winslow (DD-53) in 1918 and then the new destroyer Thatcher (DD-162) in 1919. In 1920 he returned as an instructor at the Naval Academy, serving there until 1923. He was gunnery officer on Tennessee (BB-43) from 1923-1926. He returned as an instructor at the Naval Academy from 1926-1929 before commanding Robert Smith (DD-324), Dorsey (DD-117) and Medina before becoming executive officer on Mississippi (BB-41). After a stint in the Department of the Navy in Washington, D.C., he commanded Nevada (BB-36) from 1939 to 1941.

== World War II ==
On November 5, 1941, Rockwell assumed command of the 16th Naval District, consisting of the Philippine Islands. He was present in Cavite Navy Yard when it was bombed on December 10, 1941. Most of Cavite's facilities were destroyed and the submarine Sealion (SS-195) was sunk. Rockwell estimated that 500 men were killed. The next day, with fires still burning, he recommended Cavite be stripped of usable fuel and equipment and abandoned. He organized the withdrawal of remaining Allied naval forces and civilian ships from the Philippines and left in March 1942 via PT boat. Then, he planned the naval transport of the invasion force for the Battle of Attu of May 1943. He returned to the Navy Department in 1943 and commanded the Atlantic Fleet's Amphibious Training Command until the end of the war.

== Retirement ==
Rockwell retired as vice admiral in August 1948. He lived in Georgia until his death in 1979.

Rockwell's wife Mary Allison (Wilmer) Rockwell (April 12, 1887 – July 30, 1971) predeceased him and was buried at Arlington National Cemetery. He was interred beside her on January 5, 1979.

== Awards and merits ==
Silver Star, Awarded for actions during World War II

The President of the United States of America, authorized by Act of Congress, July 9, 1918, takes pleasure in presenting the Silver Star (Army Award) to Rear Admiral Francis Warren Rockwell, United States Navy, for extraordinary heroism and distinguished service in the line of his profession while serving as Commandant, SIXTEENTH Naval District, during the period 11 to 13 March 1942, in the Philippine Islands during an extraordinary action a retrograde maneuver involving General Douglas MacArthur. Admiral Rockwell made detailed plans involving exacting preparations for a movement of major strategic importance and of the most hazardous nature, then executed the mission with marked skill and coolness in the face of greatly superior enemy forces. The conduct of Admiral Rockwell throughout this action reflects great credit upon himself, and was in keeping with the highest traditions of the Military Forces of the United States. General Orders: Headquarters, U.S. Army Forces in the Far East, General Order No. 43 (March 15, 1942) - Bureau of Naval Personnel Information Bulletin No. 306 (September 1942)

Navy Distinguished Service Medal, Awarded for actions during World War II

The President of the United States of America takes pleasure in presenting the Navy Distinguished Service Medal to Rear Admiral Francis Warren Rockwell, United States Navy, for exceptionally meritorious service to the Government in a duty of great responsibility. As Commandant of the SIXTEENTH Naval District Rear Admiral Rockwell displayed outstanding qualities of efficiency, leadership and judgment under difficult, arduous and hazardous circumstances during the Japanese assaults on Cavite, Philippine Islands, in December 1941, and the subsequent defense of Bataan Peninsula and the fortified islands at the entrance of Manila Bay both by United States Military and Naval Forces. General Orders: Bureau of Naval Personnel Information Bulletin No. 304 (July 1942)

Navy Cross, Awarded for actions during World War I

The President of the United States of America takes pleasure in presenting the Navy Cross to Lieutenant Commander Francis Warren Rockwell, United States Navy, for distinguished service in the line of his profession as Commanding Officer of the U.S.S. WINSLOW, engaged in the important, exacting and hazardous duty of patrolling the waters infested with enemy submarines and mines, in escorting and protecting vitally important convoys of troops and supplies through these waters, and in offensive and defensive action, vigorously and unremittingly prosecuted against all forms of enemy naval activity during World War I.

== See also ==
- Philippines campaign (1941–1942)
- Battle of Attu
- United States Navy
