= Harry Irvine (actor) =

British stage actor and director, 1877-1951

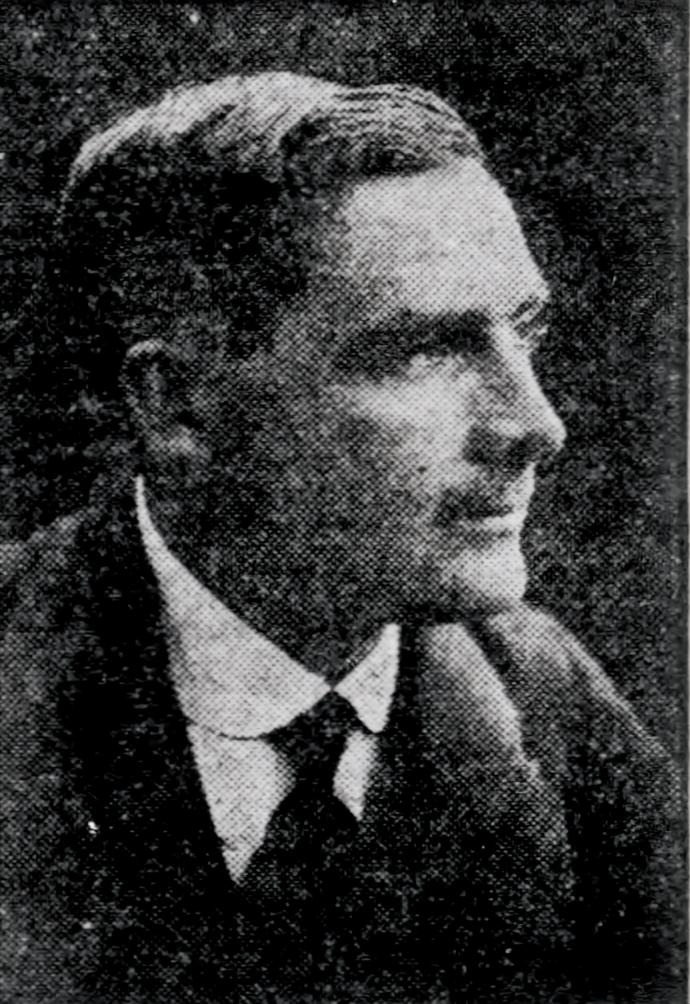
- Harry Irvine 1917
- Born: John Henry Irvine; January 30, 1877; Vellore, British India
- Died: August 7, 1951 (aged 74); Nyack, New York, U.S.
- Other names: J. Harry Irvine, John Harry Irvine, J. H. Irvine
- Education: Corpus Christi College, Oxford (BA)
- Alma mater: Inner Temple
- Occupations: Barrister; actor; stage director
- Years active: 1904 - 1950 (actor)
- Known for: Murder in the Cathedral
- Spouse: Cecily Barcham (m. 1914; died 1950)

Harry Irvine (January 30, 1877 – August 7, 1951) was a British barrister turned actor, known in America during his later career for his many roles as clergymen. He first came to America with Johnston Forbes-Robertson's tour of 1915-1916, decided to stay, and taught acting at the Brooklyn Institute. He portrayed Archbishop Thomas Beckett in the 1936 Broadway premiere of Murder in the Cathedral by T. S. Eliot, Regnault de Chartres the Archbishop of Rheims in Joan of Lorraine, and Bishop Fisher in the original Anne of the Thousand Days, both by Maxwell Anderson. He also wrote one-act plays and The Actor's Art and Job, a well-received book for potential apprentices on acting as a profession.

== Early years ==
He was born John Henry Irvine in Vellore, British India, to George Duncan Irvine, a civil servant, and Emily Gertrude Kelly, on January 30, 1877, and was baptized a month later. In 1881, Irvine and his older siblings Emily and Francis were in England, living with their aunt Margaret Irvine in Middlesex. By age 14, Irvine and Francis were boarders in Bristol, while attending Clifton College. Irvine later graduated from Corpus Christi College, Oxford, with a B.A., and spent a period of time tutoring the children of Sir Hubert Herkomer at Bushey. After failing the exam for the Indian Civil Service, Irvine read law, and was called to the Bar at the Inner Temple.

== UK stage career ==
While tutoring at Bushey, Irvine had joined the local amateur drama society. His interest in acting continued during his legal career, and in 1904 he decided to try it as a profession. He secured a walk-on part from Herbert Beerbohm Tree in Richard II at His Majesty's Theatre, and was soon promoted to a featured role. He then joined the company of Lewis Waller as a leading player. In 1907 he was chosen to produce the Chelsea Pageant, upon the recommendation of A. B. Walkley who had seen several "compressed" amateur productions Irvine devised for students at St. Mark's College in Chelsea.

The Chelsea Pageant was a community historical project that after a year-long preparation opened to public viewing for a week in June 1908. Irvine devised a structure for it of twelve episodes in the history of the area. These episodes were dramatic recreations of local historical events, from Roman Britain through 1749, several of which were written by Irvine. The pageant was held at an outdoor amphitheater on the grounds of the Royal Hospital Chelsea. It had high visibility in London newspapers, being opened by Princess Louise and the Duke of Argyll. Its success led to Irvine being identified as its producer when mentioned in the English press.

Max Reinhardt directed the premiere of The Miracle, a religious pantomime by Karl Vollmöller at the London Olympia in December 1911. Irvine started as assistant stage manager (ASM) to Reinhardt for this production, eventually working his way up to a principal role as the Minstrel.

Irvine was generally but not always credited on British stages as "J. Harry Irvine". There was an actor credited as Harry Irvine who was active in provincial towns from the 1890s through at least 1905, whose history cannot easily be reconciled with Irvine's own statements about his career.

== Early US stage career ==
Irvine joined Johnston Forbes-Robertson's final American tour, arriving in New York on October 7, 1915. The tour performed a repertory of three plays in smaller cities, finishing up in Cambridge, Massachusetts during late April 1916.

=== Brooklyn Institute ===
After Forbes-Robertson's tour ended, Irvine decided to stay in the United States. Upon the strength of his membership in the companies of Forbes-Robertson and Beerbohm Tree, and of once having worked for Max Reinhardt, Irvine was appointed director for the Institute Players. This was the performing group associated with the Department of Dramatic Arts at the Brooklyn Institute. During January 1917 he led them in presenting three one-act plays at the Academy of Music, for one of which he also performed. The following month he delivered a lecture at the same venue on The Value of Amateur Acting. For March 1917, Irvine directed the Institute Players in Kindling, a three-act drama by Charles Kenyon. Irvine then directed them in four more one-act plays, one of which, a farce titled Blood, he wrote himself, while performing in another. The final work Irvine directed them in was The Taming of the Shrew in April 1917, for which he played Petruchio.

=== Bonstelle and Selwyn ===
Irvine joined Jessie Bonstelle's company in May 1917; at the time this included Cora Witherspoon and Franklin Pangborn. In his 1942 book on the acting profession, Irvine said that Jessie Bonstelle was a "brilliant exception" among stock company directors, "who had a real genius for getting the best out of her actors". From May through September 1917, Irvine performed with her company in Detroit and Buffalo in stock productions. He then joined Selwyn & Co., under the management of Edgar Selwyn during October 1917, for a featured role in a new farce, Losing Eloise. After tryouts in Wilmington, Delaware, and Atlantic City, the production premiered on Broadway during November 1917. Through a program printing error, Irvine was billed as "S. Harry Irvine" in New York newspaper reviews, instead of his usual "J. Harry Irvine". Retitled The Naughty Wife, by the time the play reached Boston on tour in January 1918, Irvine's billing was back to the usual.

The Naughty Wife tour ended in early June 1918, and Irvine went into another Selwyn & Company production titled Double Exposure, for a tryout in Washington, D.C. This fantasy farce by Avery Hopwood had another tryout in Buffalo, but its Broadway premiere was underwhelming, and it closed after twelve days.

=== Hampden ===
Irvine next appeared on Broadway as Horatio with Walter Hampden in Hamlet, presented in a series of weekly matinees in the Elizabethan style, with a fuller text than usual. Irvine's performance "was exceptionally successful" with "admirable diction". Hamlet proved popular as a weekly matinee, and the Shakespeare Playhouse (Note: This was a production company under the direction of Frank McEntee.) did a "companion piece" for MacBeth, again with Walter Hampden, Irvine playing Banquo. This was followed by As You Like It in February 1919, which starred Elsie Mackay, and in which Irvine played Le Beau. The Hamlet of Walter Hampden having proved so successful, Irvine accompanied it on tour through April 1919. Irvine said of Hampden to an interviewer: "Mr. Hampden is an artist who never finishes with a role. He is always studying and adding to it, eager to listen to criticism and learn from it". Irvine also mentioned Hampden's generosity as leading player towards other stage actors, willingly conceding the center to minor characters.

During May 1919 Irvine rejoined Jessie Bonstelle's company for summer stock. His wife, English actress Cicely Barcham, was also a cast member that season. (Note: Cecily, her first name in English sources, was invariably spelled Cicely in America. She had previously appeared in the Broadway flop The Net by Maravene Thompson, for which IBDb mistakenly bills her as "Cicelly Barcham".) Another new member of the company was a former apprentice of the Washington Square Players named Katharine Cornell. Irvine played the title role of an elderly attorney in Grumpy, though his main function with Bonstelle this season was as stage director. For Fall 1919, Irvine again joined Hampden for touring in Hamlet, this time as Claudius, and as Mercutio in a new production of Romeo and Juliet. March 1920 marked Irvine's return to Broadway, supporting Walter Hampden in George Washington, a three-act play by Percy MacKaye. He then resumed touring with Walter Hampden, taking the role of Bassanio in The Merchant of Venice. During a February 1921 performance in Baltimore, Irvine had to assume the role of Shylock when Hampden fell sick. By April 1921, Irvine had gone from Banquo to Macduff in Hampden's touring production of MacBeth.

=== Summer work, teaching, lectures ===
In the Summer of 1921, Irvine and his wife joined the faculty of the Outdoor Players in Peterborough, New Hampshire. This was a summer school managed by Marie Ware Laughton to satisfy the dramatic aspirations of Boston society girls. It used costumes and props, but otherwise performed out of doors. Irvine directed the players and occasionally performed with them. During January 1922, Irvine started directing drama students for a school at the Lexington Theatre on Broadway. The school had its own theatre on the second floor, with a capacity for two hundred viewers. It was run by Clare Tree Major, under the direction of Walter Hampden, George Arliss, Arthur Hopkins, Rachel Crothers, and others.

It was a part-time gig; Irvine also did benefit performances for an adaptation of The Idiot, and that summer spent time with the Percival Vivian Players on the Chautauqua circuit. In August 1922, the first class of ten apprentices graduated from the Lexington Theatre drama school. Under Irvine's direction they had performed a three-act play by Rachel Crothers, The House of Lorimer, and his own translation from Spanish of the one-act Funcion di Moda. He also delivered lectures in New York City public schools on the dramatic works of James Barrie; as with other events in mid-1922, he began dropping his first initial for billing purposes.

Irvine firmly believed in Shakespeare the actor as playwright. In a lecture at the Brooklyn Institute during April 1923, he asserted that it was the acting profession that had kept Shakespeare alive through long periods of neglect by audiences and academics. The following year he publicly debated Willard Parker, then president of the Bacon Society of America, over the authorship of the plays. An audience of 800 attended their debate at The Brooklyn Institute lecture hall; no decision was given by the presiding moderator. By April 1925, Irvine had become president of the National Shakespeare Federation of America. Both Irvine and his wife performed with the Woodland Players at Winthrop and Lewiston, Maine during August 1925.

Irvine next joined the English Repertory Company headed by Florence Glossop-Harris, for a tour of Canada. Irvine was the leading man, playing Sheridan and Shakespeare, and more modern works, starting in Halifax, Nova Scotia during October 1925.

== Later US stage career ==
After an absence of ten years, Irvine returned to Broadway during December 1935 with a featured role in This Our House, a two-act historical tragedy based on Beatrice Cenci. Critic Arthur Pollack pointed out the abundance of earlier adaptations of the tale, and said of this version by Joel W. Schenker and Allan Fleming: "Their story turns out very badly on the stage. In fact, it is just so much mush", while also reporting "The acting is not enchanting". The production closed after just two performances.

=== Murder in the Cathedral ===
Despite this inauspicious return, Irvine scored a success three months later, playing Thomas Beckett in Murder in the Cathedral by T. S. Eliot. This was a limited engagement Works Progress Administration (WPA) production. Reviewer John Chapman noted "Many of last night's cast found it difficult to breathe life into the Eliot verse, but Harry Irvine gave a firm, sincere and simple performance as the Archbishop". Originally scheduled for just two weeks, the production was extended by nine days due to demand. Burns Mantle wrote "Mr. Irvine's performance as the archbishop is commanding in its dignity and impressive in its modesty. It is good so capable an actor should have found this chance, even at the end of a long career". The New York Daily News reported the WPA was confronting an unexpected problem: what to do with a hit production? Meant to provide employment for actors and stage crews during the Great Depression, the WPA generally rotated plays and casts every three weeks, but the Manhattan Theatre was sold out every night and turning away hundreds of hopeful attendees, while "Harry Irvine is considered indispensable in his present role". The play's run was extended again, and Irvine made a recording of Beckett's sermon which was broadcast over WMCA (AM) on Easter Sunday, April 12, 1936.

=== Broadway 1936-1945 ===
When Irvine was again cast as a bishop during May 1936, for another WPA production called Class of '29, a newspaper suggested typecasting. A topical play about jobless college graduates in the depression, Irvine again drew good notices as a father who misguidedly tries to buy his son a job. His next role was in a short-lived work based on Greek tragedy called Daughters of Atreus, where he again played a priest, albeit a pagan one. Reportedly cast in the new Maxwell Anderson play High Tor in late December 1936, Irvine was replaced by Lee Baker before opening night.

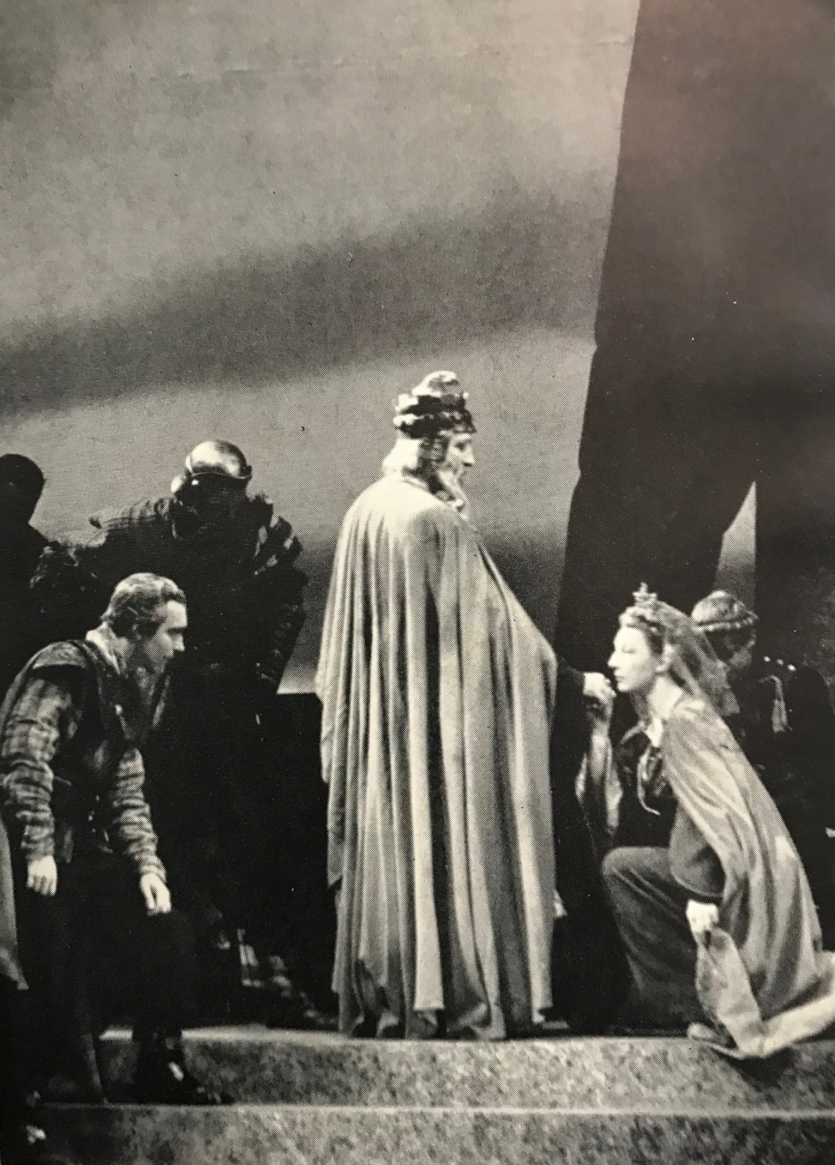
MacBeth (1941)

Returning to the WPA in June 1938, Irvine gave an "excellent supporting" performance in a George Bernard Shaw political comedy, On the Rocks. For the rest of that summer he performed with the company at the Westport Country Playhouse, and joined the Theatre Guild cast in September 1938 for a part in Dame Nature. This comedy starred Montgomery Clift as a French teenage father-to-be, with Irvine in a small part as a helpful doctor. It ran on Broadway through early November, but closed in Chicago after only two weeks. Still with the Theater Guild, Irvine performed in Jeremiah on Broadway during February and March 1939.

Irvine played a physician in Delicate Story, a comedy by Ferenc Molnár that premiered on Broadway during December 1940. The play had been written after Molnar had arrived in America as a refugee in 1940. Translated, staged and co-produced by Gilbert Miller, it starred Edna Best and John Craven, but the light romantic comedy didn't last.

For the next four years Irvine performed in Shakespeare revivals, both on Broadway and on tour, starting with MacBeth in November 1941, where he played King Duncan to Maurice Evans and Judith Anderson as Lord and Lady MacBeth. During November 1945 he was cast for a featured part in the Broadway premiere of The Mermaids Singing by John Van Druten. Irvine played an unsympathetic academic who verbally challenges the playwright protagonist. A rare Van Druten failure, the play lasted only seven weeks.

=== Joan of Lorraine ===
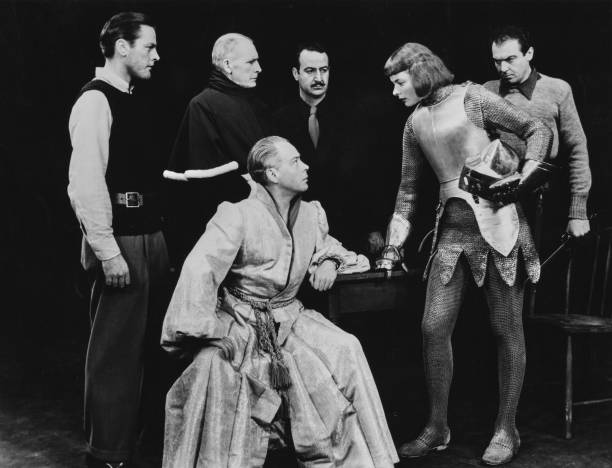
Irvine in Joan of Lorraine (standing, second from left)

Reviewer John Chapman said "Joan of Lorraine is not precisely a play-within-a-play but rather a play about a play". Written by Maxwell Anderson and produced by the Playwrights' Company, the actors portrayed both crew and cast rehearsing a play about Joan of Arc. The central problem of the drama is a dispute between actress Mary Grey (Ingrid Bergman) playing the title role, with the director Jimmy Masters (Sam Wanamaker) and the unseen playwright, over the nature of Joan's faith. Irvine played an actor named Kipner, who portrays Regnault de Chartres the Archbishop of Rheims. Brooks Atkinson thought the entire cast performed well, and said "Harry Irvine's Archbishop conveys a cunning and worldly austerity". Joan of Lorraine ran from November 18, 1946 through May 10, 1947.

Following the end of Joan, Irvine was cast as one of four principals in Dear Judas, a drama adapted by Michael Meyerberg from a 1929 long narrative poem by Robinson Jeffers. Critic Arthur Pollack said the play "has no life in it", and audiences agreed, the play closing after two weeks in October 1947. He had more success with Skipper Next to God in January 1948. This was the American premiere of a play by Jan de Hartog, directed by Lee Strasberg, and starring John Garfield in an all-male cast. The story concerned a Dutch ship's captain (Garfield) trying to find a New World port that would accept his "cargo" of 137 Jewish refugees. Produced by the Experimental Theater, it was originally intended for a week's performance. Robert Sylvester of the New York Daily News praised the entire cast, particularly Garfield, and named that of Harry Irvine among seven "exceptional performances". Irwin Shaw, writing in The New Republic, concurred: "In the second act especially are memorable performances by Richard Coogan, Eugene Stuckman, and Harry Irvine". Skipper Next to God finally closed at the end of March 1948, having been extended many times past its original one week engagement.

=== Final performances ===
During October 1948, Irvine was hired to perform in Maxwell Anderson's new play Anne of the Thousand Days. Produced by the Playwrights' Company, it starred Rex Harrison as Henry VIII and Joyce Redman as Anne Boleyn. The play premiered on December 8, 1948, with Irvine in the role of the elderly Bishop John Fisher, who along with Sir Thomas More (Russell Gaige), would be sent to the Tower and later executed by Henry VIII. The role was little more than a walk-on, but the production ran through to October 1948, one of the longer engagements of Irvine's career.

The next month, he was cast in a revival of Caesar and Cleopatra by George Bernard Shaw. The production starred Cedric Hardwicke and Lili Palmer in the title roles, while Irvine doubled up in two small parts. This was Irvine's last known performance, the production closing on April 29, 1950.

== Acting book ==
E. P. Dutton published Irvine's The Actor's Art and Job in March 1942. This 251 page volume was meant as an introduction to acting as a profession for novices, and a caution for those thinking of it. The latter tone is set by the title of the first chapter: Must You Act? Dorothy Stickney and her husband Howard Lindsay each contributed a forward. In her preface, Alice White pointed out that Irvine was one of the few actors she could think of who wrote about acting as a profession. Reviewer Charles S. Mitchell said "The author has little to say about himself but much about acting", and "your reviewer unhesitatingly recommends this book" to all who love the theater. Louise Mace in the Springfield Daily Republican noted: "The author is consoling in his admission that great beauty is not a vital requisite, but the knowledge of how to make the best of natural equipment is." Drama critic Linton Martin in The Philadelphia Inquirer highlighted the chapter on "Etiquette in the Theater", with an anecdote from Irvine's then recent performance in the jinx play, MacBeth.

== Death ==
Irvine died on August 7, 1951, at the home of friends in Nyack, New York. He had been living with them since the death of his wife a year earlier. His obituary mentioned he had been suffering from heart trouble for many years. It is the only source for his "informal" soubriquet, the Bishop of Broadway.

== Personal life ==
At age sixty, Irvine stood 6 feet 1 inch (1.85 m) and weighed 180 pounds (82 kg); he had gray hair and green eyes. Already overage by the time of the Great War, he had at some time in his younger life suffered from rheumatic fever, the aftereffects of which precluded military service. (Note: His 1918 US Draft Registration card noted other debilitating physical conditions as well as "rheumatic tendencies".) A brief 1908 profile of him mentioned he had no recreations other than golf.

On June 3, 1914, Irvine married actress Cecily Barcham at St Mary The Boltons in London. She had been born in London, England on October 15, 1885; the couple had no children.

== Works ==
=== Plays ===
- Blood! (1917) - One-act play performed by the Brooklyn Institute Players at the Academy of Music.
- The Love Lotion (1919) - One-act fantasy first performed by the East-West Players (Note: This troupe should not be confused with the much later organization of Asian-American performers.) at the Jewish Art Theatre.
- The King's Dancer (1921) - One-act allegorical play performed by the Outdoor Players at Peterborough, New Hampshire during August 1921.
- A Modern Fantasy (1924) - One-act monologue co-written with Leslie Moore, first presented in Lancaster, Pennsylvania.
- The Third Time (1925) - One-act play co-written with Frances Gostling, presented at Winthrop, Maine.

=== Essays ===
- Sir James Barrie as a Constructive Force in Modern Drama (1922) - Delivered as a public lecture.
- William Shakespeare (1923) - Delivered as a lecture at the Brooklyn Institute.
- William Shakespeare - A Human Being (1925) - Delivered as a lecture at Dalhousie University.
- Choice of a Career (1925) - Delivered as a lecture at Halifax Ladies College, on the stage as a profession.

== Stage credits ==
Plays in which Harry Irvine performed by year of his first appearance. Most performances before 1915 cannot be identified.
Year	Play	Role	Venue	Notes/Sources
1904	Richard II		His Majesty's Theatre	Irvine's first known professional stage credit.
1911	The Miracle	(ASM)/The Minstrel	Olympia London	Max Reinhardt's production of Karl Vollmöller's pantomime.
1912	The Dreamer		King's Hall Covent Garden	Religious play by Mabel Dearmer; the reviewer would not identify actors with their roles out of piety.
1913	School for Scandal	Charles Surface	Arts Centre, Mortimer Street	Produced by the Black Cat Club, composed of authors and amateurs.
1913	A Gauntlet	Alfred	Coronet Theatre	Adapted by R. Farquharson Sharp from the 1883 play En hanske by Bjørnstjerne Bjørnson.
1915	Hamlet	First Gravedigger	Touring company	Irvine later switched to the First Player for this Forbes-Robertson production.
1915	The Passing of the Third Floor Back	Harry Larkum	Touring company	1908 fantasy drama by Jerome K. Jerome from his novel.
1916	The Light That Failed	Phil Raynor	Touring company	Three-act play adapted by George S. Fleming from the 1891 novel by Rudyard Kipling.
1917	The Maker of Dreams	Pierrot/(Director)	Academy of Music	One-act play by Oliphant Down, in which Irvine both performed and directed.
1917	The Lips of La Sauterelle	Tawno Chickno/(Director)	Academy of Music	One-act play by Frances M. Gostting.
1917	The Taming of the Shrew	Petruchio/(Director)	Academy of Music	The Brooklyn reviewer blamed Irvine's direction for rushed scenes and faulty diction.
1917	Shirley Kaye		Garrick Detroit	Irvine's first role with the Bonstelle Company was this social comedy by Hulbert Footner.
1917	The Professor's Love Story	Henders	Garrick Detroit	Revival of a three-act 1891 comedy by J. M. Barrie.
1917	A Thousand Years Ago		Garrick Detroit	Anachronistic 1914 romance by Percy MacKaye has Commedia dell'arte players in Five Dynasties China.
1917	Half Hour	Dr. Brodie	Garrick Detroit	One-act three scene play by J. M. Brodie given for Stage Woman's War Relief Fund.
1917	The New Henrietta	Dr. George Wainwright	Garrick Detroit	1913 update by Winchell Smith and Victor Mapes of The Henrietta by Bronson Howard.
1917	It Pays to Advertise		Star Theater Buffalo	
1917	His Majesty, Bunker Bean	Balthazar	Star Theater Buffalo	
1917	Good Morning, Rosamond!	Village Suitor	Star Theater Buffalo	Debut of a comedy by Constance Lindsay Skinner from her own novel, about a Nova Scotia village widow.
1917	Hit-the-Trail Holliday	Rev. T. B. Holden	Star Theater Buffalo	George M. Cohan four-act comedy about an abstaining bartender.
1917	The Cinderella Man	D. Romney Evans	Star Theater Buffalo	Irvine plays an attorney in this Edward Childs Carpenter comedy.
1917	Losing Eloise	Carter	The Playhouse; Nixon's Apollo Theatre; Sam H. Harris Theatre	The tryout cities had it right, but Broadway miscredited him as "S. Harry Irvine".
1918	Double Exposure	Baba Mahrati	Touring company Bijou Theatre	Fantasy farce, in which Irvine is an Indian mystic who causes two husbands to swap physical bodies.
1918	Hamlet	Horatio	Plymouth Theatre	Presented by the Shakespeare Playhouse as Friday and Saturday matinees.
1918	MacBeth	Banquo	Plymouth Theatre	This Shakespeare Playhouse production was limited to Saturday matinees.
1919	As You Like It	Le Beau	Plymouth Theatre	Another Shakespeare Playhouse presentation as Friday and Saturday matinees.
1919	Grumpy	Andrew Bullivant	Shubert Garrick	Irvine played the title role in this 1913 comedy by Horace Hodges and Thomas Wigney Percyval.
1919	Romeo and Juliet	Mercutio	Touring company	Critic Arthur Pollock said Irvine "clowns his part" at first then "grows more genuine".
1919	The Wayfarer	Despair	Madison Square Garden	This Christian interdenominational spectacle was called "a pictorial sermon" by a reviewer.
1920	George Washington	The Presence	Lyric Theatre	Irvine had a part in the prologue to this pageant "destitute of dramatic quality".
1920	The Merchant of Venice	Bassanio	Touring company	
1920	The Taming of the Shrew	A Pedant	Touring company	
1922	The Idiot		Republic Theatre; Little Theatre	Adaptation of Dostoevsky's novel by John Cowper Powys and Reginald Pole.
1922	Clouds of the Sun	Gaston LeFevre	The Cloisters (Note: This was the studio of George Grey Barnard, located at 191st Street and Fort Washington Avenue in Manhattan.)	A poetic play by Isabel Fiske Conant with medieval music, a benefit for French war orphans.
1922	Her Own Money	Lewis Alden	Chautauqua Tent, Ottawa	Irvine plays a likeable but overly proud husband in three-act work by Mark Swan.
1922	The Admirable Crichton	Crichton	Brooklyn Academy of Music	A limited engagement revival with the Brooklyn Institute players.
1925	Mr. Pim Passes By	Mr. Pim/(Director)	Casino Theatre (Note: This was part of a summer resort near Lewiston, Maine.)	
1925	The Third Time		Theatre of the Woods (Note: This venue was located near summer resorts at Mount Pisgah in Winthrop, Maine.)	One-act play by Irvine presented on a bill with other playlets.
1925	The Swan Song	The Actor/(Director)	Casino Theatre	One-act play by Anton Checkov.
1925	The Opening of Pierrot's Eyes	Prologue/(Director)	Casino Theatre	One-act play which Irvine adapted from the Spanish and directed.
1925	A Royal Divorce	Marquis de Beaumont	Majestic Theatre (Note: This was in Halifax, Nova Scotia.)	Irvine drew high praise from the local critic in this tragic romance by W. G. Wills.
1925	Henry VIII	Henry VIII	Majestic Theatre	
1925	The Story of the Rosary	Karl La Rose	Majestic Theatre	War drama by Walter Howard had Irvine as a cashiered officer who enlists in the ranks.
1925	Milestones	John Rhead	Majestic Theatre	
1926	The Romantic Young Lady	The Apparition/(Director)	By-Way Theatre (Note: This venue was in Boothbay Harbor, Maine.)	Irvine and his wife spent another summer directing the Woodland Players.
1926	Deburau	Jean-Gaspard Deburau/(Director)	By-Way Theatre	
1935	This Our House	1st Judge	58th Street Theatre	Two-act act tragedy starred Edith Atwater and Ian Maclaren.
1936	Murder in the Cathedral	Thomas Beckett	Manhattan Theatre	Though a limited engagement revival, Irvine scored a high-profile success.
1936	Class of '29	Bishop Holden	Manhattan Theatre	Another WPA production, by Orrie Lashin and Milo Hastings.
1936	Daughters of Atreus	Kalchas the Priest	44th Street Theatre	Literate first play by Robert Turney was let down by poor casting and direction.
1938	On the Rocks	Old Hipney	Daly's 63rd Street Theatre	Irvine is a plain-speaking proletariat among the blueblood politicians.
1938	Dame Nature	Doctor Faridet	Booth Theatre	Theatre Guild production adapted by Patricia Collinge from the 1935 comedy by André Birabeau.
1939	Jeremiah	Hananiah	Guild Theatre	A drama of the prophet Jeremiah written in 1917 by Stefan Zweig.
1940	Delicate Story	Physician	Henry Miller's Theater	
1941	MacBeth	King Duncan	National Theatre	Irvine doubled up in the small role of the Doctor for this production.
1942	Bird in Hand	Thomas Greenleaf	Morosco Theatre	Revival of 1929 comedy by John Drinkwater lasted only one week.
1943	Richard III	Henry VI (Note: IBDb has confused Irvine's role with that of actor John Ireland, who played Henry Tudor, Earl of Richmond, later Henry VII, and also doubled as the First Murderer.)	Forrest Theatre	Irvine again doubled up parts, also playing the Lord Mayor of London.
1945	The Mermaids Singing	Professor James	Empire Theatre	
1946	Joan of Lorraine	Kipner	Alvin Theatre	Irvine plays an actor portraying Regnault de Chartres, the Archbishop of Rheims.
1947	Dear Judas	Lazarus	Mansfield Theatre	Adapted from a work by Robinson Jeffers.
1948	Skipper Next to God	The Clergyman	Maxine Elliott's Theatre	
1948	Anne of the Thousand Days	Bishop John Fisher	Shubert Theatre	
1949	Caesar and Cleopatra	Harpmaster / Priest	National Theatre	

== Bibliography ==
- Harry Irvine. The Actor's Art and Job. E. P. Dutton & Company, New York, 1942.
