= Albert C. Johnston =

American doctor (1900–1988)

Albert C. Johnston (August 17, 1900 – June 23, 1988) was an American doctor. Described as part-black and of multiracial parentage Johnston and his family, passed as white while living in Gorham and Keene, New Hampshire.

William Lindsay White wrote a Reader's Digest article about the Johnston family and a short book was published from it in 1948 titled, Lost Boundaries. In 1949, a film of the same name was adapted from the book, though changing the names of all involved and key elements were altered and made up. Except for supporting cast members, white actors were used for the film. In 1989 a follow-up film, Lost Boundaries Reunion was made with interviews of family members. Johnston was from Chicago and studied at Rush Medical College. He interned at Maine General Hospital. Johnston had trouble finding work but was eventually secured employment as a doctor by passing as white. He was a country doctor and radiologist in New Hampshire. He entered the Navy as a commissioned officer but the offer was rescinded; he eventually learned that the decision was due to the discovery of his ethnic background.

Johnston's son, Albert C. Johnston Jr., one of four children, composed music including songs used in the film about the family. After working in Keene until the mid-1960s, Johnston Sr. moved to Kaua'i and worked as a radiologist at Wilcox Memorial Hospital; he died at the age of 87 at Castle Medical Center after being treated for chest congestion. He was buried in Keene.

In 2013, Stanford University professor Allyson Hobbs wrote about the Johnstons and their passing in her book A Chosen Exile: A History of Racial Passing .
