= Skipper Next to God =

1951 film

- Directed by: Louis Daquin
- Written by: Louis Daquin; Jean Mercure; Jan de Hartog
- Based on: Skipper Next to God by Jan de Hartog
- Produced by: Robert Dorfmann; Pierre Lévy-Corti
- Starring: Pierre Brasseur; Loleh Bellon; Jean-Pierre Grenier
- Cinematography: Louis Page
- Edited by: Victoria Mercanton
- Music by: Jean Wiener
- Production companies: La Cooperative Générale de Cinéma Français; Silver Films
- Distributed by: Les Films Corona
- Release date: 2 March 1951
- Running time: 92 minutes
- Country: France
- Language: French

Skipper Next to God (French: Maître après Dieu) is a 1951 French drama film directed by Louis Daquin and starring Pierre Brasseur, Loleh Bellon and Jean-Pierre Grenier. It is based on the 1945 play of the same name by Jan de Hartog. It was shot at the Joinville Studios in Paris. The film's sets were designed by the art director Robert Clavel.

== Synopsis ==
Captain Joris Knaipper is a harsh, domineering figure who considers himself only just behind God in giving orders on his ship. In the late 1930s he arrives in Hamburg and reluctantly picks up a cargo of a hundred fifty passengers who he is told are legally emigrating to Egypt. In fact they are Jewish refugees escaping persecution in Nazi Germany. During the course of the journey, thanks to his newfound Christian spirit, he assists them to get to safety even at the cost of scuttling his own ship.

== Cast ==
- Pierre Brasseur as Capitaine Joris Knaipper
- Loleh Bellon as Hélène
- Jean-Pierre Grenier as Le Bosco
- Jacques François as Le docteur
- Jean Mercure as Le rabbi
- Louis Seigner as Le pasteur Lewis
- Pierre Latour as Ritter
- Yvette Etiévant as La fille
- Maurice Lagrenée as Le consul de Hollande
- Abel Jacquin as Le commandant américain
- Gérard Buhr as L'officier allemand
- Emilio Carrer as L'officier égyptien
- Albert Rémy as Le cuistot
- Manuel Gary as L'officier américain
- Guy Mairesse as Un passager juif
- Andrews Engelmann as Un passager juif
- Georges Wilson as Un passager juif
- Giani Esposito as Un passager juif
- Paul Crauchet as Un passager juif
- Yves Massard as Un passager juif

== Bibliography ==
- Brownstein, Rich. Holocaust Cinema Complete: A History and Analysis of 400 Films. McFarland, 2021.
- Goble, Alan. The Complete Index to Literary Sources in Film. Walter de Gruyter, 1999.
- Oscherwitz, Dayna & Higgins, MaryEllen. The A to Z of French Cinema. Scarecrow Press, 2009.
- Plunka, Gene A. Staging Holocaust Resistance. Springer, 2012.
- Rège, Philippe. Encyclopedia of French Film Directors, Volume 1. Scarecrow Press, 2009.
