= Danger (TV series) =

American dramatic anthology TV series

- Scene from an episode of the show
- Genre: Anthology
- Written by: Jay Presson Allen; George Bellak; Mark Hellinger; Paul Monash; Reginald Rose; Rod Serling; Gore Vidal
- Directed by: Yul Brynner; Curt Conway; Tom Donovan; John Frankenheimer; Sidney Lumet; Ted Post; Sheldon Reynolds
- Presented by: Dick Stark
- Narrated by: Dick Stark
- Composer: Tony Mottola
- Country of origin: United States
- Original language: English
- No. of seasons: 5
- No. of episodes: 242

Production
- Producers: Martin Ritt; William Dozier
- Camera setup: Single-camera
- Running time: 25 mins.

Original release
- Network: CBS Television
- Release: September 26, 1950 – May 31, 1955

Danger is a CBS television dramatic anthology series that began on September 26, 1950, and ended on May 31, 1955. Its original title was Amm-i-dent Playhouse. The show "was one of the first television dramatic series to make effective use of background music"

The show featured many actors including Leslie Nielsen, E. G. Marshall, Joseph Anthony, Edward Binns, John Cassavetes, Míriam Colón, Ben Gazzara, Grace Kelly, Richard Kiley, Walter Slezak, Hildy Parks, James Gregory, Paul Langton, Cloris Leachman, Jayne Meadows, Gregory Morton, Martin Ritt, Maria Riva, Lee Grant, Kim Stanley, Rod Steiger, Charles Tyner, Steve Allen, Anne Bancroft, Jacqueline Susann, Walter Matthau, and Leo Penn.

Singer Johnny Desmond made his TV acting debut in the April 28, 1953, episode.

== Production ==
Charles Russell was the producer of Danger. Yul Brynner was one of the directors. Other directors included Curt Conway and Sidney Lumet.

Tony Mottola composed the show's theme and background music for episodes. Richard Stark was the announcer.

Amm-i-dent sponsored the program, which was originally titled Amm-i-dent Playhouse. The title was changed effective with the September 26, 1950, episode.

== Episodes ==
Partial list of episodes of Danger
Date	Episode	Actor(s)
November 17, 1950	"Witness for the Prosecution"	Sarah Churchill
November 21, 1950	"Borderline Affair"	Iris Mann
April 17, 1951	"The Great Gilson Bequest"	Franchot Tone
September 4, 1951	"Death Among the Relics"	Joseph Walsh, Edward Binns, Tom Gorman
October 9, 1951	"Nightmare"	Maria Riva
October 7, 1952	"The Scarlet Thread"	Carmen Mathews, Bramwell Fletcher, Philip Bourneuf, Darren McGavin, John C. Becher
October 14, 1952	"Buttons"	Mildred Natwick, Don Hanmer, Virginia Vincent, Charles Welsh, John Shelley, Eda Heinemann
October 21, 1952	"The Payoff"	Richard McMurray, Fred Sciully, James Bender, Jack Warden, Sally Gracie
November 11, 1952	"The Fix"	Pat O'Malley, E. G. Marshall, John Forsythe, Lisa Howard, Val Avery, Barbara Joyce, Georgiana Johnson
December 30, 1952	"Death Pulls No Strings"	Bil Baird, Cora Baird, Chester Morris
