= Woman Doctor =

1939 American film directed by Sidney Salkow

- Theatrical poster
- Directed by: Sidney Salkow
- Screenplay by: Joseph Moncure March
- Story by: Alice Altschuler; Miriam Geiger
- Produced by: Sol C. Siegel
- Starring: Frieda Inescort; Henry Wilcoxon; Claire Dodd
- Cinematography: Ernest Miller
- Edited by: Ernie Nims; Murray Seldeen
- Music by: Cy Feuer
- Production company: Republic Pictures
- Distributed by: Republic Pictures
- Release date: February 6, 1939 (US)
- Running time: 65 minutes
- Country: United States
- Language: English

Woman Doctor is a 1939 American melodrama film directed by Sidney Salkow and starring Frieda Inescort, Henry Wilcoxon, and Claire Dodd. The screenplay was written by Joseph Moncure March, based on a story by Alice Altschuler and Miriam Geiger. The film opened on February 6, 1939.

== Cast list ==
- Frieda Inescort as Dr. Judith Randall
- Henry Wilcoxon as Allan Graeme
- Claire Dodd as Gail Patterson
- Sybil Jason as Elsa Graeme
- Cora Witherspoon as Fanny
- Frank Reicher as Dr. Mathews
- Gus Glassmire as Dr. Martin
- Dickie Jones as Johnny
- Joan Howard as Louise
- Spencer Charters as Veterinarian
- Virginia Brissac as Miss Crenshaw
- Rex as Moxie
