= The Mermaids Singing (play) =

1944 Play by John Van Druten

- Original title: Home Ground
- Original language: English
- Written by: John Van Druten
- Subject: Middle-aged temptation
- Genre: Comedy
- Setting: Any major American city outside of New York

Premiere
- Date: November 27, 1945
- Place: Empire Theatre
- Directed by: John Van Druten
- Original run: 53 performances

The Mermaids Singing is a 1944 play, originally titled Home Ground, written by John Van Druten. It is a comedy with three acts, seven scenes, four settings, and 14 speaking characters. The action of the play spans six days time. The story concerns a married middle-aged playwright, overseeing the tryout of his latest work away from home, who hears a mermaid's song in the form of a lively and admiring young woman. The title comes from the 1915 poem, The Love Song of J. Alfred Prufrock by T. S. Eliot.

Alfred de Liagre Jr produced the play, which was staged by the author with settings by Raymond Sovey. The leads were Walter Abel and Beatrice Pearson, with Frieda Inescort and Lois Wilson in support. The Mermaids Singing had tryouts in New Haven and Boston during November 1945 then made its Broadway premiere later that same month, joining two other long-running Van Druten plays, The Voice of the Turtle and I Remember Mama. Sold-out theater party sales, a feature of the times, led to it being booked weeks in advance of the premiere. However, critical reception was mixed and the production closed in January 1946 after only 53 performances.

== Characters ==
Characters are listed in order of appearance within their scope.

Leads

- Clement Waterlow, called Clem, is 45, a happily married playwright who likes an occasional adventure.
- Dee Matthews is 20, a college sophomore, very pretty and lively, overly fascinated by the middle-aged Clem.

Supporting

- Bertha Corrigan is 42 and widowed; she is a supporting actress in Clem's new play, and a fling ten years past.
- Mrs. Matthews is 42, Dee's mother; gentle, wise, and worried about her daughter's infatuation.

Featured

- George is 65, a room service waiter in the hotel, easygoing and garrulous.
- Thad Greelis is 21, a US Navy ensign; handsome, well-mannered, engaged to Dee Matthews.
- Mrs. Betty James is 40, friend to Mrs. Matthews; a gossipy sharp-tongued busybody, wife of Professor James.
- Professor James is a college English professor and Luther's uncle; he is formal, pedantic, and challenging.
- Luther Cudworth is 22, a corporal home on leave; he is obnoxious, argumentative, and an experimental writer.

Bit players

- An Elderly Gentleman
- A Waiter
- A Drunk
- A Girl
- A Man

Off stage

- Jessica Waterlow is the playwright's wife whom he speaks with twice by long-distance telephone.
- Laura Musgrave is the leading lady of Clem's new play, who calls him on the hotel room phone.
- Eugene Ballinger, called Gene, is Bertha's late actor husband, whose infidelity drove her to Clem.
- An Army Colonel, Bertha's newest romance, who visits her in the hotel one night.

== Synopsis ==
This synopsis is based on the 1946 published play. The setting throughout is said to be "any large American city, other than New York", with Boston or Philadelphia the likeliest candidates for a two-week tryout run, and what the author has in mind.

Act I Scene 1 (Living room of a suite in an excellent hotel. Monday at 11:30pm.) Clem sits in his suite after the first tryout of his new play. George brings a case of whiskey instead of a bottle; he knows theatre people have many unexpected visitors. Bertha enters and calmly accepts that her second-act lines will have to be cut. Bertha and Clem discuss adultery, the subject of his new play. He is surprised to learn he was her only liaison, and she otherwise disapproves of it. Jessica calls Clem on the phone; she is in New York with their daughters. He asks if she considers him an immoral playwright and is stunned at her affirmative reply. Clem tells Bertha about meeting a Navy ensign and his girl in the tryout audience. Clem invites them up to his room when Thad calls from the lobby. Thad and Dee are introduced to Bertha. Dee talks about her father's admiration for Bertha's acting. The four get along so well that when Laura Musgrave calls Clem, he finagles an invitation for them to go to Laura's party. (Curtain)

Act I Scene 2 (The same, 3:30am.) Dee and Clem bring the early newspaper editions back to his hotel room, after dropping Thad off at the train station. (Note: The play is suffused with the wartime domestic economic conditions of 1944-1945. Gasoline is rationed, pleasure driving is banned, and intercity public transport is severely overcrowded for everyone except servicemen, who had priority in reservations and boarding.) They read the reviews by the local drama critics: two are positive, and one decries the lack of "action". They discuss their lives and develop a rapport. Dee urges Clem to come tour a local art museum with her that afternoon, and they agree to meet for lunch at the hotel bar. As she leaves to take a taxi home, Clem impulsively kisses her. (Curtain)

Act II Scene 1 (The hotel bar, Tuesday at noon.) Bertha and the Elderly Gentleman discuss her part being reduced. He is outraged about the change, his protests heard by Clem and Dee who have just come in for lunch. Bertha takes her admirer away, but Dee and Clem are soon interrupted by Betty James. She thrusts herself upon them, inveigling free tickets from Clem, while dropping Thad's name into the conversation to let Clem know Dee has a fiancé. Betty leaves, making a veiled threat to Dee about telling Mrs. Matthews where her daughter is and with whom. Mrs. Matthews comes to the bar to ask Dee to call her Red Cross supervisor, having been alerted by Betty James. While Clem takes a phone call, Dee and Mrs. Matthews discuss the impropriety of the situation and the likelihood of Betty spreading rumors. To forestall her, Mrs. Matthews invites Clem to dinner on Friday. (Curtain)

Act II Scene 2 (Mrs. Matthews' house, Friday at 10:30pm.) Having finished dinner, Clem, Mrs. Matthews and Dee relax in the living room. Also present are Betty and Professor James, and the bibulous Luther. The Professor and Luther badger Clem about his new play and his opinions on other playwrights, while Betty makes suggestions the adultery in Clem's play reflects his own predilections, with side glances at Dee. The latter is convinced her mother arranged this fracas to put Clem off, rather than to stop Betty's rumor-mongering. Clem, however, handles the aggravation adroitly, and offers to guide the staggering Luther back to their hotel. Afterwards, Mrs. Matthews admits to Dee that he behaved much better than the other guests. When she goes to bed, Dee calls a taxi to take her to the hotel. (Curtain)

Act II Scene 3 (The hotel bar, around midnight.) Throughout this scene, two nearby tables are occupied: a Girl and a Man at one, and a Drunk at another, while a Waiter serves the customers. None of these characters has more than a few lines, and they have no effect other than as background ambience. At the center table, Bertha and Clem talk about Dee. Bertha probes Clem's intentions towards her. He denies being a cradle-snatcher, but she is unconvinced, and warns him not to trifle with her. They are startled to see Dee come into the bar. Dee confirms Clem's recounting of the dinner. Bertha gets a telephone call from her Colonel and has to leave. Dee tells Clem she is falling in love with him. He tries to bluff her out of it but fails. She candidly confesses she is not a virgin, so he shouldn't worry about that. Luther barges into the bar, having left his hotel room where Clem deposited him. He tries to hit on Dee but is chased off. Clem then fends off Dee's advances and sends her home. (Curtain)

Act III Scene 1 (Park across from hotel, early Saturday morning.) Clem encounters Dee sitting on a bench. She has been waiting, thinking he might come out to the park. He tells her about his wife and daughters. Tentatively, Dee asks if she might visit him in New York. Clem gives her a qualified yes; he isn't quite sure they understand each other. After Dee leaves, Bertha sits next to him and tells her sad story. She spent the night with the Colonel in her hotel room, only to find out in the morning he has a wife and family in Wyoming, and was now on his way there having received his discharge. (Curtain)

Act III Scene 2 (Same as Act I, that afternoon.) Clem is visited by Mrs. Matthews. Dee has told her she is thinking of going to New York. Mrs. Matthews expresses her concern to Clem that he will ruin Dee's life; she knows there can be no real future there for Dee. Clem is disingenuous at first, but admits he hasn't discouraged Dee from the notion that she might fit into his world. After she leaves, Thad comes up to the hotel room. Betty has attached herself to him, bringing books for Clem to autograph. She is pushed out, and Thad delivers his plea to Clem: don't encourage Dee to stray from home. Jessica calls Clem; their daughter Joan wants to see his new play for her 15th birthday so they will come on Monday. As Clem hangs up, Dee shyly enters his room. She has brought a sketch of Clem she drew herself. Clem now discourages her from any thought of an affair or New York. She bursts into tears, but realizes he won't fall in love with her. Dee tears the sketch in half. Bertha phones to invite Clem to lunch, as Dee slips out of the room, exchanging painful glances with Clem. As he speaks with Bertha, Clem tears the sketch into tiny pieces. (Curtain)

== Original production ==
=== Background ===
John Van Druten originally copyrighted this play as Home Ground in 1944. By August 1945, Claudia Cassidy reported the title had changed to The Mermaids Singing, and that Alfred de Liagre Jr would produce it, as he had The Voice of the Turtle. This latter play was now in its third season on Broadway, while Van Druten had just won the Donaldson Award for Best Director for the staging of his own play, I Remember Mama. Claudia Cassidy said Van Druten got the new title from The Love Song of J. Alfred Prufrock by T. S. Eliot. He had thought to rename it Siren Song, but friends persuaded him it would only evoke air raid sirens.

Screen star Walter Abel, who had not been on Broadway since 1936, was signed for the male lead by mid-September 1945. Beatrice Pearson was cast a week later for the female lead. Raymond Sovey was hired to do the scenic design, and Lois Wilson signed by early October 1945. A week later the remaining principal part was cast with Frieda Inescort, with rehearsals beginning on October 14, 1945.

=== Cast ===
Cast for the New Haven and Boston tryouts and during the Broadway run.
Role	Actor	Dates	Notes and sources
Clement Waterlow	Walter Abel	Nov 08, 1945 - Jan 12, 1946	
Dee Matthews	Beatrice Pearson	Nov 08, 1945 - Jan 12, 1946	
Bertha Corrigan	Lois Wilson	Nov 08, 1945 - Jan 12, 1946	
Mrs. Matthews	Frieda Inescort	Nov 08, 1945 - Jan 12, 1946	
George	Arthur Griffin	Nov 08, 1945 - Jan 12, 1946	
Thad Greelis	Walter Starkey	Nov 08, 1945 - Jan 12, 1946	
Mrs. James	Jane Hoffman	Nov 08, 1945 - Jan 12, 1946	Hoffman, married during the Broadway run, received a curious wedding announcement in the Daily News. (Note: "Jane Hoffman, comedy lead in The Mermaids Singing, and William Friedberg, violent pamphleteer, were married over the holiday weekend. It's a match in which neither is good enough for the other. The honeymoon will be spent at the bridegroom's ancestral home, Southern Comfort.")
Professor James	Harry Irvine	Nov 08, 1945 - Jan 12, 1946	Born in British India, Irvine was known as the Bishop of Broadway for his many clerical roles.
Luther Cudworth	Jack Manning	Nov 08, 1945 - Jan 12, 1946	
An Elderly Gentleman	Wallace Widdecombe	Nov 08, 1945 - Jan 12, 1946	
A Waiter	Leon Forbes	Nov 08, 1945 - Jan 12, 1946	
A Drunk	Frank Lyon	Nov 08, 1945 - Jan 12, 1946	
A Girl	Dina Merrill	Nov 08, 1945 - Jan 12, 1946	This was her Broadway debut.
A Man	David Van Winkle	Nov 08, 1945 - Jan 12, 1946	His first and only Broadway credit, Van Winkle was a recently discharged veteran. (Note: Eight months earlier, as a captain with a 7th Armored Division scout squadron in the last days of World War II, Van Winkle had suffered a knife wound fighting hand-to-hand in a cellar with a diehard Nazi fanatic.)
A Captain	Tom Jewert	Nov 08, 1945 - Nov 25, 1945	This role was eliminated after the Boston tryout.
A Lady	Ellen Southbrook	Nov 08, 1945 - Nov 25, 1945	This role was eliminated after the Boston tryout.

=== Tryouts ===
The Mermaids Singing had its first tryout at the Shubert Theatre in New Haven, Connecticut, on November 8, 1945. The reviewer for The Hartford Courant credited a strong cast with giving the play more weight than the writing deserved. Van Druten's characters were plausible, but their situations were inconsequential, while the dialogue was trite and lacking in wit. The reviewer also mentioned the forced pace of the play: "Mr. Van Druten's direction, which, perhaps aware of the talkiness [sic] of what he has contrived, rushes his actors along lest they bog down in words".

Following New Haven, the production opened for a two-week tryout at the Wilbur Theatre in Boston, on November 13, 1945. The opening night was a sellout, and critic Cyrus Durgin said both he and the audience enjoyed The Mermaids Singing. Durgin thought the play "witty and sophisticated and a little sentimental", and predicted Broadway success if it was revised and reduced in length. He felt Van Druten's writing had lapsed in "the second scene in the hotel bar". Durgin praised the acting of Walter Abel, Beatrice Pearson, Frieda Inescort and Lois Wilson, and singled out Jane Hoffman's "crackling blonde" and Jack Manning's "obnoxious author-in-uniform".

After the first week, the Brooklyn Eagle reported that The Mermaids Singing "seems to be a hit in Boston". Two minor characters that appeared in the tryout cast were not present in later cast lists, suggesting some revisions to the play during the Boston run. Just before the Broadway premiere of The Mermaids Singing, John Van Druten wrote a brief article for The New York Times, a retrospect of his twenty years writing plays. He concluded it on a cautionary tone: "Nature has mercifully arranged that people forget one's flops as soon as one has another hit. That is something to try and remember when the next failure arrives".

=== Broadway premiere and reception ===
The production had its Broadway premiere at the Empire Theatre on November 28, 1945. Critic Arthur Pollock suggested that John Van Druten, having two major successes still running on Broadway, had written The Mermaids Singing to please himself, and without regard for its longevity or box office potential. Pollock thought it "a sweet play and wise in a leisurely way, definitely leisurely". John Chapman also thought the play too long, though he admitted "it is written and acted with skill". Its main problem was unrealized expectations: "The girl wants to and the man wants to but nobody does". Chapman felt the best thing in the entire production was Beatrice Pearson's performance.

Lewis Nichols in The New York Times said The Mermaids Singing is "a play which seems never to get going, which is cluttered up with assorted extraneous characters and which talks itself into a state of complete lassitude". He was impressed with Beatrice Pearson's acting, saying she "offers the part far more than there seems basically to be in it", while Walter Abel was "not finding enough in the character to make it a complete figure". A more damning review came from the Associated Press drama critic, Jack O'Brian, who said The Mermaids Singing was "a mess of ridiculously out-of-date dialogue, shoddy situations and generally-bad theatrical structure", and summed it up as "Pretty bad".

An article on agents buying out entire theatre dates for charity theater parties in advance of an expected hit, mentioned that The Mermaids Singing "has booked 27 sellout theater parties a week before it came to town". These advance sales could prove lucrative, but "Trouble starts, however, when someone guesses wrong and a show proves a dud. There is then a general scrambling on everybody's part to get out from under."

=== Closing ===
The Mermaids Singing closed at the Empire Theatre on January 12, 1946, after 53 performances.

== Bibliography ==
- John Van Druten. The Mermaids Singing. Dramatists Play Service Inc, 1946.
