= Seth Arnold =

American actor (1885–1955)

Seth Arnold (1885 – January 3, 1955) was an American theater and film character actor.

== Early life ==
Arnold was born in 1885 in London, England to American parents. His father represented the American Tobacco Company in London. After his family moved back to the United States, Seth joined the Castle Square Stock Company in Boston in 1901.

== Career ==
Arnold's first role consisted of a single line in "Quo Vadis" in 1901. During World War I, he did intelligence work for the government, afterwards becoming a theatrical director. He directed productions in Boston, Chicago, St. Louis, and Jersey City but returned to acting in 1927 in the role of a physician in The Arabian Nightmare at the Cort Theatre in New York City. He played another physician in 1928's Quicksand and starred in Steel (1931), Mourning Becomes Electra (1932), Pursuit of Happiness, Tommy and Unto the Third (1933), Symphony (1935) and Ah, Wilderness! (1935), where in the road production he played Nat Miller, one of the play's key roles. He also starred in Lady Lucky in 1936 and as Doremus Jessup in 1937's It Can't Happen Here by Sinclair Lewis. In 1939, he starred with Helen Hayes in What Every Woman Knows. He was in Conquest in 1940 and in Clash By Night in 1941. He again appeared with Hayes in Harriet (about Harriet Beecher Stowe) in 1943. He also starred in Last Stop (1944), A Place of Our Own (1945), A Joy Forever (1945), I Like It Here (1946), Years Ago (1946). In 1947, he left Broadway to appear in the Hollywood version of Mourning Becomes Electra but was forced out of the cast by illness. He appeared in other films, including Lost Boundaries. He returned to Broadway in 1950's Arms and the Girl.

He belonged to Actors' Equity and the Screen Actors Guild.

== Personal life ==
Arnold was married to a fellow actor who was known professionally as Laurie McVicker. He died in his home at the Marie Antoinette Hotel in New York City on January 3, 1955.
