= Jack Manning (actor) =

American actor (1916–2009)

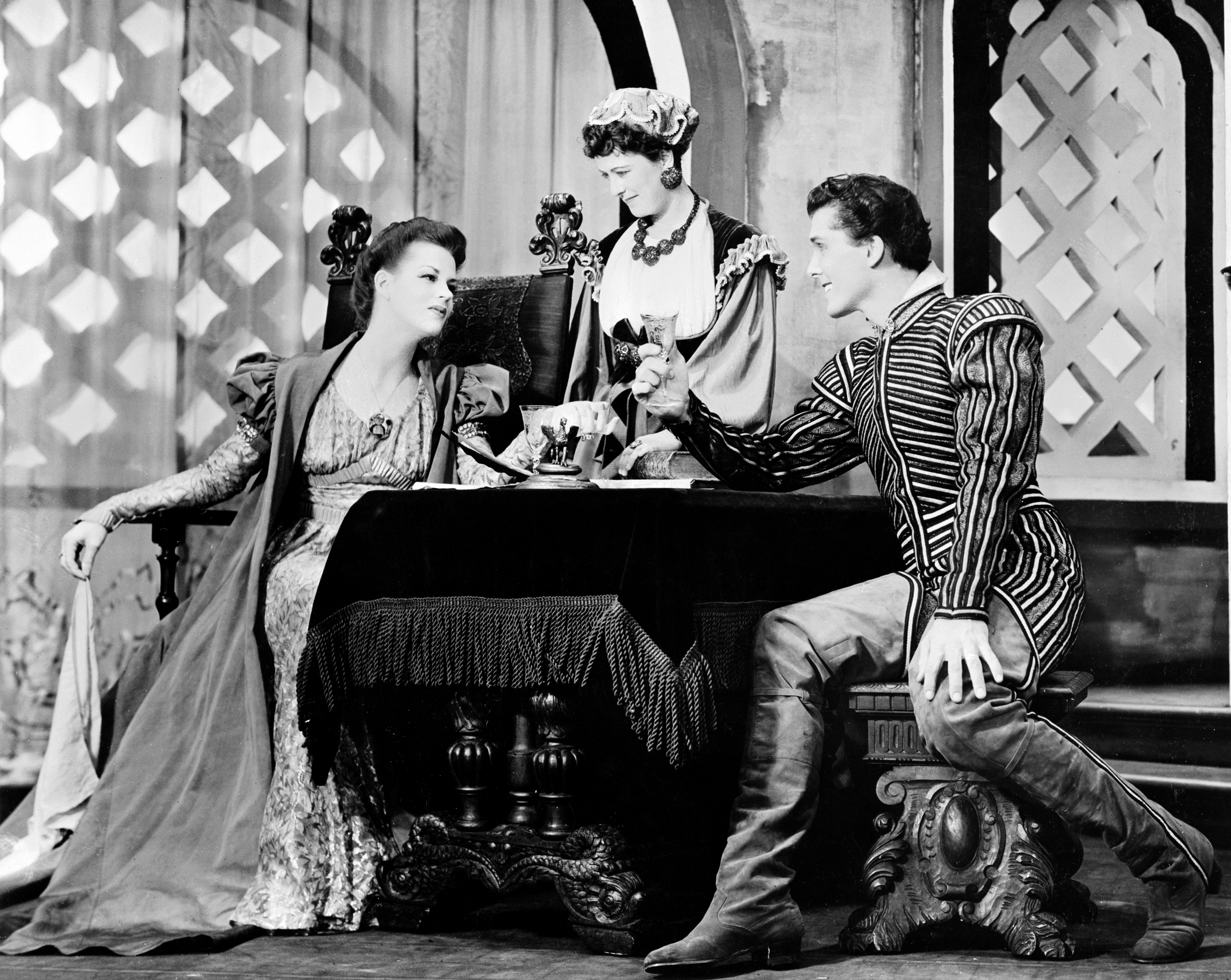
- Scene from Othello (1943) with Uta Hagen as Desdemona, Margaret Webster as Emilia, and Jack Manning as Roderigo
- Born: Jack Wilson Marks; June 3, 1916; Cincinnati, Ohio, U.S.
- Died: August 31, 2009 (aged 93); Rancho Palos Verdes, California, U.S.
- Occupations: Actor, stage director, acting teacher
- Years active: 1941-2004
- Spouses: Virginia Schuchardt, Frances "Francie" Ann Smith (m. 1967)

Jack Manning (born Jack Wilson Marks, June 3, 1916 – August 31, 2009) was an American film, television and theater character actor, teacher and stage director.

== Biography ==
=== Early years ===
Manning was born Jack Wilson Marks in Cincinnati, Ohio. He developed an interest in acting while he was a student at the University of Cincinnati, where he earned his bachelor's degree in economics in 1938. During his college years, Manning appeared in students musicals and plays, as well as on WLW radio. He changed his professional name to Jack Manning early in his acting career, after he was advised that "Jack Marks" was too short to appear on a theater marquee or sign.

=== Career ===
Following graduation, Manning moved to New York City in 1941. He soon found a job on The Aldrich Family radio show, where he played one of Henry Aldrich's friends. As a member of the NYC Theatre Guild on the Air, Manning appeared in a number radio dramas broadcast from the city. He lent his voice and talents to such classic radio serials as One Man's Family, The Goldbergs, The Green Hornet and The Shadow.

Manning made his Broadway debut in the comedy Junior Miss in 1941. Manning ultimately appeared in more than 20 separate Broadway theatre plays and musicals during his career. Notably, Manning starred as Rodrigo in Othello opposite Paul Robeson, José Ferrer and Uta Hagen, from 1943 until 1945. He also appeared in Harriet, a drama about the life of Harriet Beecher Stowe, in 1943, co-starring with Helen Hayes. He followed that with a featured role in the short-lived John Van Druten comedy, The Mermaids Singing (1945). His other Broadway credits included Man and Superman in 1947, Billy Budd in 1951, The Tender Trap in 1954, Say Darling in 1958 and Alice In Wonderland. Manning also appeared in the original Broadway cast of the musical, Do I Hear a Waltz?, as Mr. McIlhenny in 1965. Do I Hear a Waltz? was co-written Arthur Laurents, Richard Rodgers and Stephen Sondheim.

Moving to television in 1953, Manning performed a one-man show of Hamlet on the DuMont series Monodrama Theater. His show took place over the course of two weeks in 15-minute-long segments. Before the airing of the first episode Jack Gould, a television critic for the New York Times, wrote in his column, "Alas, poor Hamlet. Now he's a soap opera." After seeing the production, he changed his tune, calling it, "The acting feat of year" and he praised Manning's performance as Hamlet, calling him "inventive, versatile and, above all, natural." Gould also noted of Manning at the time that, "He knows his Shakespeare and truly catches the meaning of the lines." Manning also appeared in a number of early television shows, including Armstrong Circle Theatre, Robert Montgomery Presents and The Philco Television Playhouse.

Manning became a producer for the Helen Hayes Repertory Company, a traveling theater troupe founded in 1964 by his former Harriet co-star, Helen Hayes. Manning would direct all of the company's traveling stage productions, which starred Helen Hayes, including a tour of The Circle, which was written by W. Somerset Maugham.

Manning and his wife, Francie, who were married in 1967, moved to the South Bay, Los Angeles region in 1970. The couple resided in both Hermosa Beach and Manhattan Beach before settling in Rancho Palos Verdes in 1980.

He continued to appear in Los Angeles television, film and theater productions throughout the 1970s. He was cast in a recurring role as the character Dean Rutherford on The Paper Chase from 1978 to 1979. He was also cast in guest parts on The Mary Tyler Moore Show, Columbo, Kojak, Here's Lucy, The Waltons and Studio One. On stage, Manning appeared in productions in the Ahmanson Theatre, the Shubert Theater and the Dorothy Chandler Pavilion.

Manning's film credits included Walk East on Beacon in 1952, Where's Poppa? in 1970, The Owl and the Pussycat in 1970, The Great Northfield Minnesota Raid in 1972, and The Great Waldo Pepper in 1975.

== Later life and death ==
In addition to his acting career, Manning spent much of his later life working as an acting teacher or a stage director. He taught acting at his own studios, first in New York City and then in Los Angeles. In New York, Manning taught students at the HB Studio in the city's Greenwich Village neighborhood. He also taught at several universities nationwide.

Jack Manning died at his home in Rancho Palos Verdes home on August 31, 2009, at the age of 93. He was survived by his second wife, Frances "Francie" Ann Smith, whom he married 1967. The couple had two children together, a son, Colin, and daughter, Brook Manning. He was also survived by his daughter from his first marriage, Gale Nichols. His first marriage to Virginia Schuchardt ended in divorce.

== Filmography ==
Year	Title	Role	Notes
1970	Where's Poppa?	Lawyer for Memphis Maulers	
1970	The Owl and the Pussycat	Mr. Weyderhaus	
1972	The Biscuit Eater	Gun Club Secretary	Uncredited
1972	The Great Northfield Minnesota Raid	Heywood	
1972	Now You See Him, Now You Don't	Man in Forsythe Entourage	Uncredited
1972	Melinda	Bank Man	
1973	The Thief Who Came to Dinner	Tom Preston	
1973	Superdad	Justice of the Peace	
1974	Herbie Rides Again	Lawyer - First Team	
1974	Death Wish		Uncredited
1975	The Strongest Man in the World	Krinkle Krunch Executive	Uncredited
1975	The Great Waldo Pepper	Director, Spanish Set	
1976	Gus	Mayor	
1982	Frances	Studio Photographer	
1987	Beyond the Next Mountain	College Professor	
1997	Just Write	George	
