= Force of Evil =

1948 film by Abraham Polonsky

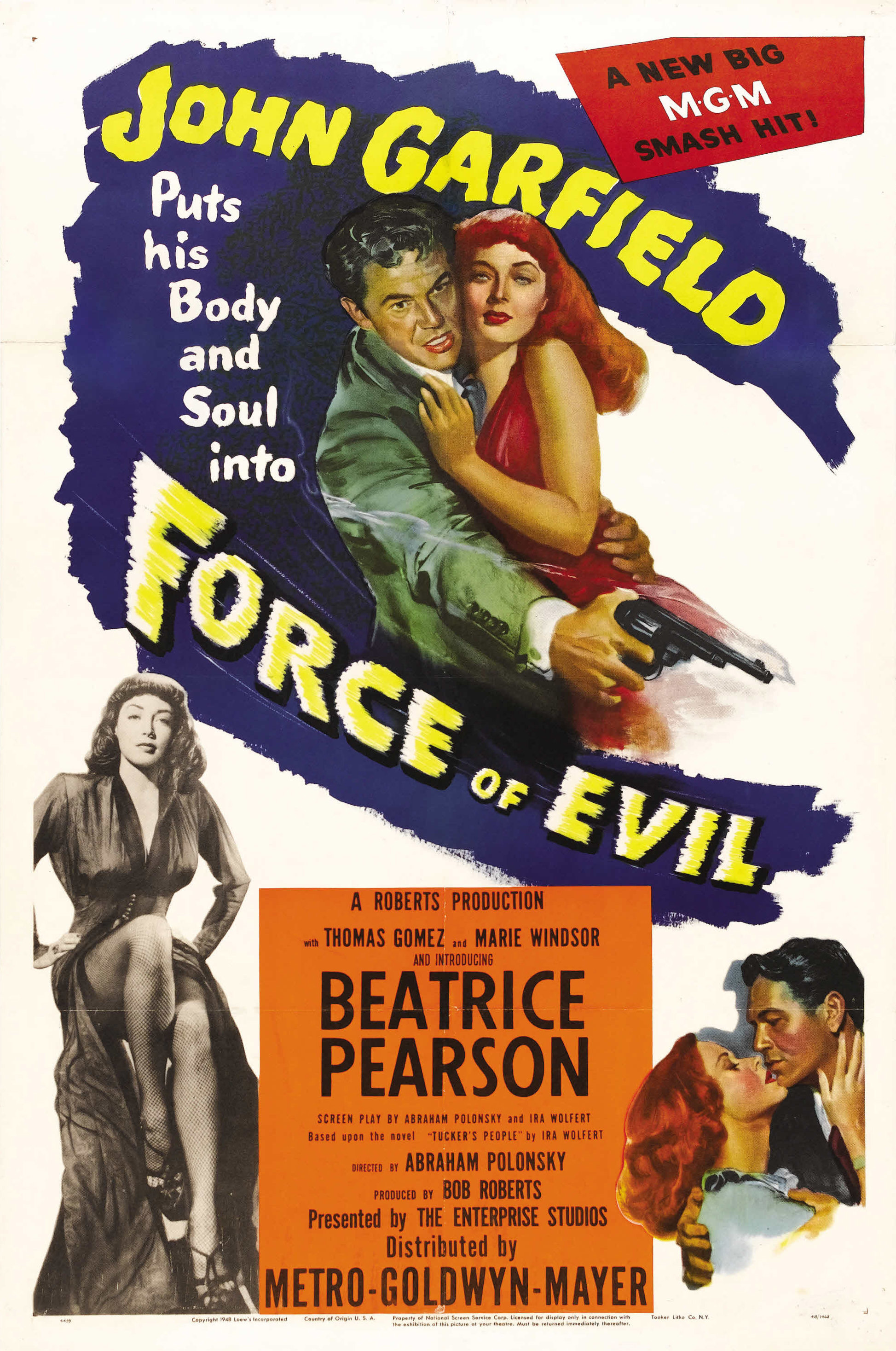
- Theatrical release poster
- Directed by: Abraham Polonsky
- Screenplay by: Abraham Polonsky; Ira Wolfert
- Based on: Tucker's People; 1943 novel by Ira Wolfert
- Produced by: Bob Roberts
- Starring: John Garfield; Thomas Gomez; Marie Windsor; Beatrice Pearson
- Cinematography: George Barnes
- Edited by: Art Seid
- Music by: David Raksin
- Production company: Enterprise Productions
- Distributed by: Metro-Goldwyn-Mayer
- Release date: December 25, 1948 (United States)
- Running time: 78 minutes
- Country: United States
- Language: English
- Budget: $1,150,000
- Box office: $1,165,000

Force of Evil is a 1948 American film noir starring John Garfield and Beatrice Pearson and directed by Abraham Polonsky. It was adapted by Polonsky and Ira Wolfert from Wolfert's novel Tucker's People. Polonsky had been a screenwriter for the boxing film Body and Soul (1947), in which Garfield had also played the male lead. The film received positive reviews from critics.

In 1994, Force of Evil was selected for preservation in the United States National Film Registry by the Library of Congress as being "culturally, historically, or aesthetically significant".

== Plot ==
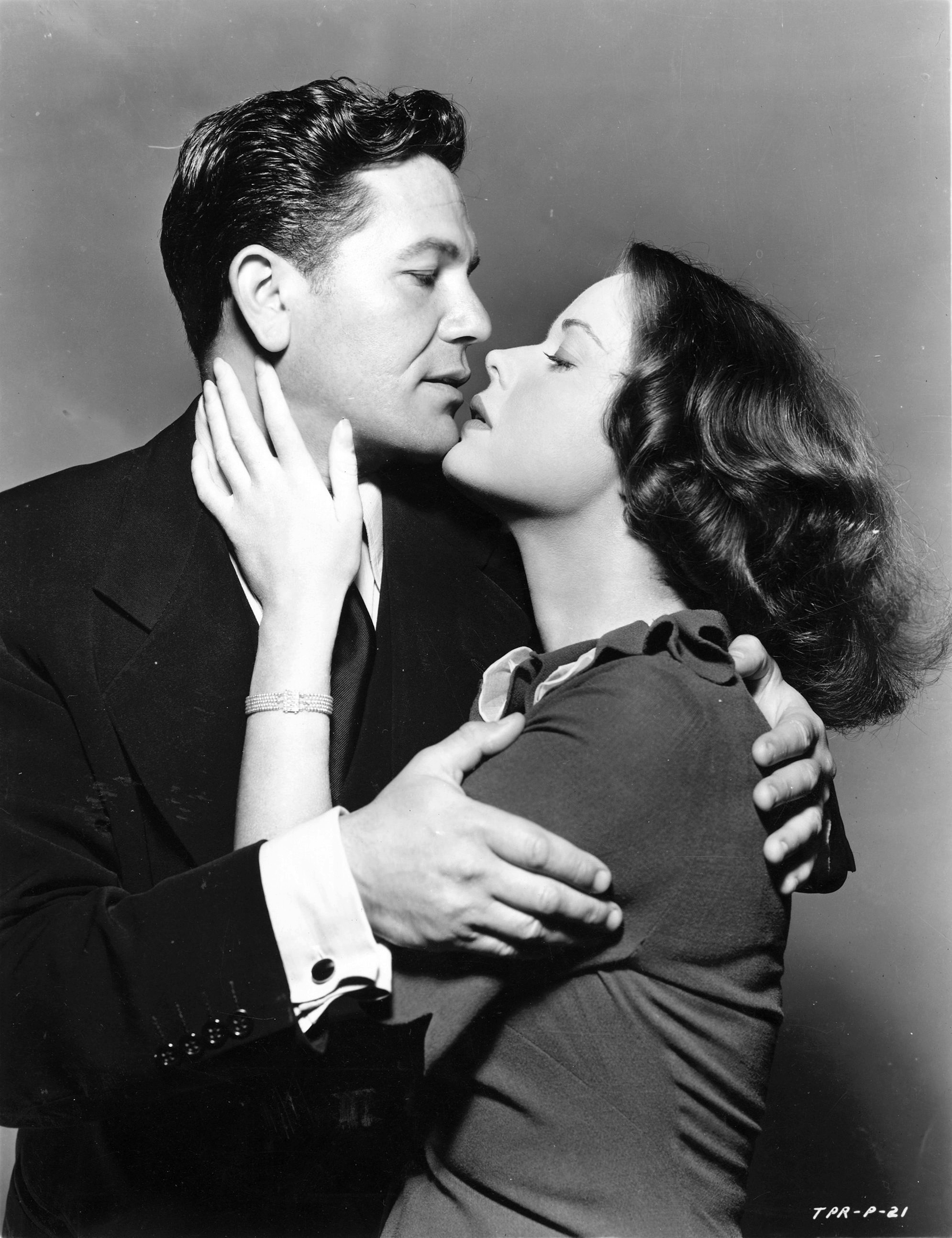
Garfield and Pearson in Force of Evil

Joe Morse is a lawyer working with powerful gangster Ben Tucker. Tucker plans to consolidate and gain control over the numbers racket in New York City. He plans to rig the winning number to 776, a number popularly played on the Fourth of July (a reference to 1776 and the Revolutionary War) - when the number hits, the ‘banks’ that run the racket will go broke, allowing Tucker to take over.

Joe visits his estranged brother Leo, who runs a small-time bank, to persuade him to partner with Tucker. Leo rejects the offer as blackmail; Joe calls the police to raid the bank, hoping to force Leo’s hand. Joe bails Leo out of jail, who asks Joe to help his secretary Doris, who he sees as a daughter, to find a new job. Joe gives Doris a ride home, where the two express a mutual attraction but disagree on the morality of their respective criminal enterprises.

Tucker's plan to rig the numbers is successful, busting the banks. Joe visits Leo and his wife Sylvia at home, proposing a plan to keep Leo out of bankruptcy, which he reluctantly agrees to. On his way out, he runs into Doris, who again declines his advances. The next day, Tucker’s men take over at Leo's bank. Bookkeeper Bauer attempts to resign, but is threatened by Joe and Tucker’s men, needing him to help facilitate the merger. Bauer calls the police, offering to become an informant to help raid and shut down the numbers racket. On his way out, he is approached by Wally, a representative of gangster Bill Ficco. Ficco is looking to get into the numbers game himself, and wants Bauer to set up a meeting with Leo to get information on Tucker’s operation.

Joe is warned by Tucker’s wife Edna, who Joe is carrying on an affair with, that Tucker’s telephone has been tapped by prosecutors. Joe later finds that his own phone is also tapped. He rejects Edna’s advances, leaving his office with Doris and taking her back to his apartment, where the two kiss. The next day, Leo’s bank is raided by police again. At the courthouse, Tucker tells Joe that the situation between him and Ficco could lead to violence. Joe demands Leo be allowed to leave the numbers business, agreeing to take over the bank himself. He also finds a furious Doris, who accuses him of forcing Leo to stay in the business.

When Joe returns to work late that night, he finds his partner Joe Wheelock in his office, revealing him as a police informant and the one who had Joe’s phone tapped. He retrieves a gun and money from his safe, planning to use it to skip town. Bauer is again approached by Wally to set up a meeting between Ficco and Joe; fearing for his life, he agrees. Leo and Bauer meet at a restaurant, where Leo is grabbed by Ficco’s men. In the commotion, Bauer is killed.

Joe goes out drinking with Doris who rejects his invitation to flee with him, encouraging him to turn himself in and telling him that she loves him. After the two receive the news about Leo and Bauer, Joe rushes to Tucker’s house, where he is meeting with Ficco. Tucker agrees to cut Ficco in on the numbers racket to end the violence, on the condition that Ficco keeps the banks running and the employees from quitting by any means necessary. When Joe arrives, he demands to see Leo, and attacks Ficco when he finds out about the deal. Ficco reveals that he has had Leo killed, dumping his body by the lighthouse. While talking to them, Joe surreptitiously lifts the tapped telephone off the receiver, allowing the prosecutor’s office to listen in on Ficco confessing to the killings of Bauer and Leo. He then breaks the light in Tucker’s office, plunging the room into darkness. Ficco accidentally kills Tucker, and is then killed himself by Joe. Joe goes with Doris to find Leo’s body, before leaving to turn himself over to the police.

== Cast ==
- John Garfield as Joe Morse
- Beatrice Pearson as Doris Lowry
- Thomas Gomez as Leo Morse
- Marie Windsor as Edna Tucker
- Howland Chamberlain as Frederick "Freddie" Bauer
- Roy Roberts as Ben Tucker
- Paul Fix as Bill Ficco
- Stanley Prager as Wally
- Barry Kelley as Det. Egan

== Reception ==
=== Critical response ===
When the film was released, the staff at Variety magazine gave the film a mixed review, praising its production values but panning its focus and "intrusively" flowery language:

Force of Evil fails to develop the excitement hinted at in the title. Makers apparently couldn't decide on the best way to present an exposé of the numbers racket, winding up with neither fish nor fowl as far as hard-hitting racketeer meller is concerned. A poetic, almost allegorical, interpretation keeps intruding on the tougher elements of the plot. This factor adds no distinction and only makes the going tougher ... Garfield, as to be expected, comes through with a performance that gets everything out of the material furnished ... On the technical side, the production fares better than story-wise. The physical mounting is expertly valued; the New York locale shots give authenticity; and lensing by George Barnes, while a bit on the arty side, displays skilled craftsmanship.

Bosley Crowther, the film critic for The New York Times, liked the film, and wrote, "But for all its unpleasant nature, it must be said that this film is a dynamic crime-and-punishment drama, brilliantly and broadly realized. Out of material and ideas that have been worked over time after time, so that they've long since become stale and hackneyed, it gathers suspense and dread, a genuine feeling of the bleakness of crime and a terrible sense of doom. And it catches in eloquent tatters of on-the-wing dialogue moving intimations of the pathos of hopeful lives gone wrong."

Film historian Andrew Sarris wrote in 1968,

Force of Evil stands up under repeated viewings as one of the great films of the modern American cinema and Garfield's taxicab scene with Beatrice Pearson takes away some of the luster Kazan's Brando-Steiger tour de force in On the Waterfront.

Eddie Muller, writing about Polonsky, pointed out that

he was one of the first Hollywood filmmakers to attempt a form of cinematic poetry, using imagery, dialogue, and narration in three-part harmony. Revelatory speeches erupt almost unconsciously from the characters. Scenes are composed with the melancholy of Edward Hopper paintings. The editing is often daringly abrupt. Despite the bleakness at the film's core, the story-telling was fueled by creative adrenaline.

In the decades since its release Force of Evil has been recognized by some as a high point of the film noir genre, powerful in its poetic images and language, by such film critics and historians such as William S. Pechter and Andrew Dickos. Its influence has been acknowledged many times by Martin Scorsese in the making of his crime dramas.

Force of Evil was featured in Jonathan Rosenbaum's alternative Top 100 American Movies, a response to the AFI Top 100.

=== Box-office ===
According to MGM records the film earned $948,000 in the US and $217,000 overseas.

=== Awards and honors ===
American Film Institute Lists

- AFI's 100 Years ... 100 Movies - Nominated
- AFI's 10 Top 10 - Nominated Gangster Film
- AFI's 100 Years ... 100 Movies (10th Anniversary Edition) - Nominated

== Preservation ==
Force of Evil was preserved and restored by the UCLA Film and Television Archive, restoration provided by the Packard Humanities Institute. The restoration premiered at the UCLA Festival of Preservation in 2022.

== See also ==
- List of cult films
