= Beatrice Pearson =

American actress

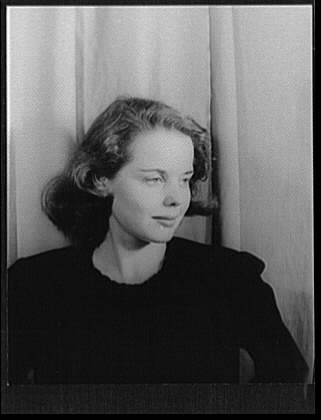
- Pearson in 1946
- Born: July 27, 1920; Denison, Texas, US
- Died: February 1, 1986 (aged 65)
- Occupation: Film actress

Beatrice Pearson (July 27, 1920 – February 1, 1986) was an American actress, probably best known for her role as co-star in the 1948 film noir Force of Evil. She won a Theatre World Award in 1946 for Outstanding Broadway Debut Performance in The Mermaids Singing by John Van Druten.

== Biography ==
Beatrice Pearson was born on July 27, 1920, in Denison, Texas.

In 1948, The New York Times published a lengthy profile of Pearson's early life and career. The "daughter of an itinerant construction engineer," she grew up on the west coast and departed for New York City at age 18 with $80 in savings. She reported living frugally: "Once I was down to eating snow off the windowsill, with a little chocolate sauce I found left in the cupboard, and I got so I could regularly stretch a ten-cent package of spaghetti and a bottle of ketchup out for a month." The Times reported a walk-on role in Liliom in 1940, and then small parts in the first Life with Father road company, doing eighteen months in Boston and Detroit. Following other smaller roles, she played a lead in Free and Equal with James Barton, leading to a contract from 20th Century Fox--"ostensibly for the lead in Song of Bernadette, although the role "had been cast even before it was offered to her." Publicity at MGM suggested appearances in Thirty Seconds over Tokyo, Song of Russia, and Kismet, though none actually came to pass, and she returned to Broadway, gaining the Jenny Lupton role in Over 21 (January–July 1944). A contract from Samuel Goldwyn followed for a planned George Cukor film, but when production was delayed she again departed for New York, taking the lead role in Voice of the Turtle. David O. Selznick, upon viewing her performance, wooed her back to Hollywood, but she "spent a year doing no more than play in the Selznick-sponsored summer theatre at La Jolla." She obtained release from her Selznick contract and began her association with Abraham Polonsky on Force of Evil.

She appeared in only one other film, playing the female lead in Lost Boundaries in 1949, and died in February 1986.

== Partial filmography ==
- Force of Evil (1948)
- Lost Boundaries (1949)

== Selected awards ==
- Theatre World Award for Outstanding Broadway Debut Performance, 1946
