= Arms and the Girl (musical) =

1950 Broadway musical

- Music: Morton Gould
- Lyrics: Dorothy Fields
- Book: Herbert Fields, Dorothy Fields, and Rouben Mamoulian
- Setting: During the American Revolution
- Basis: The Pursuit of Happiness by Lawrence Langner and Armina Marshall
- Premiere: February 2, 1950: 46th Street Theatre, New York City

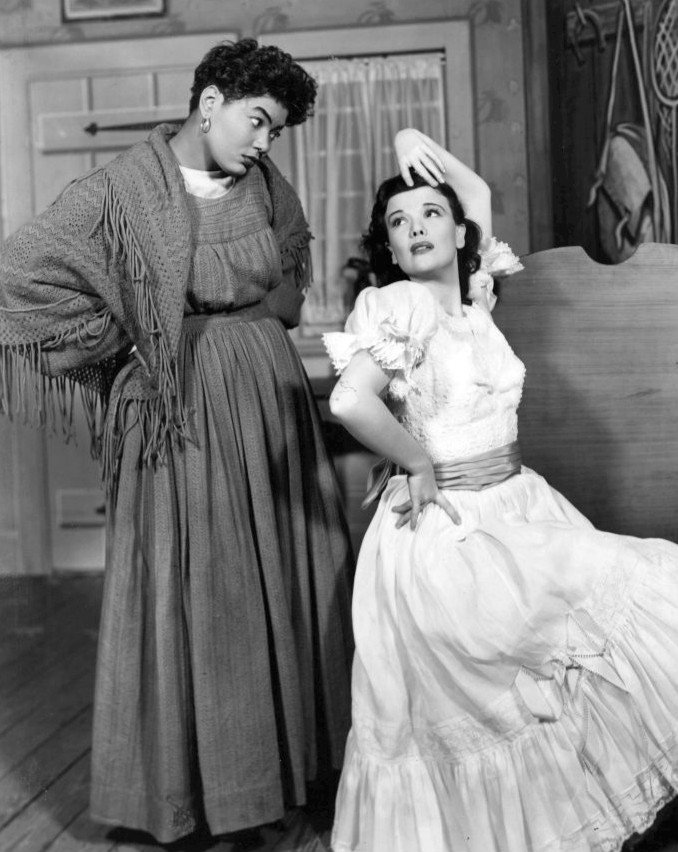
Pearl Bailey and Nanette Fabray as Connecticut and Jo

Arms and the Girl is a 1950 Broadway musical with a book by Herbert Fields, Dorothy Fields, and Rouben Mamoulian, music by Morton Gould, and lyrics by Dorothy Fields. The show is based on the play The Pursuit of Happiness by Lawrence Langner and Armina Marshall. It opened at the 46th Street Theatre on February 2, 1950, and closed on May 27 after 134 performances.

== Premise ==
During the American Revolution, an American revolutionary named Jo, who lives in Connecticut, falls in love with a Hessian soldier. Connecticut, a runaway slave who uses the name of whatever colony she is living in, is also involved.

== Songs ==
=== Act l ===
- A Girl With a Flame
- That's What I Told Him Last Night
- I Like It Here
- That's My Fella
- A Cow and a Plough and a Frau
- Nothin' for Nothing'
- He Will Tonight
- Plantation in Philadelphia
- You Kissed Me

=== Act ll ===
- Don't Talk (reprise)
- I'll Never Learn
- There Must Be Something Better Than Love
- She's Exciting
- Mister Washington! Uncle George
- A Cow and a Plough and a Frau (reprise)

== Cast ==
	1950 Broadway
Captain Aaron Kirkland	Florenz Ames
Thad Jennings	Seth Arnold
Comfort Kirkland	Lulu Belle Clarke
Colonel Mortimer Sherwood	John Conte
General Lucius Curtis	Clifford Dunstan
Jo Kirkland	Nanette Fabray
Franz	Georges Guétary
Prudence Kirkland	Eda Heinemann
General George Washington	Arthur Vinton
Abigail	Mimi Cabanne
Ben	Sterling Hall
Betsy	Joan Keenan
Connecticut	Pearl Bailey
David	Philip Rodd
John	Paul Fitzpatricks
Matthew	Joseph Caruso
Town Crier	William J. McCarthy
Militiaman	Peter Miceli
Drummer	Jerry Miller
Sergeant	Norman Weise
Sons of Liberty	Andy Aprea, Victor Young
Aides to General Curtis	Dan O'Brien, Robert Rippy

== See also ==
- List of plays and musicals about the American Revolution
