= Frieda Inescort =

Scottish actress (1901–1976)

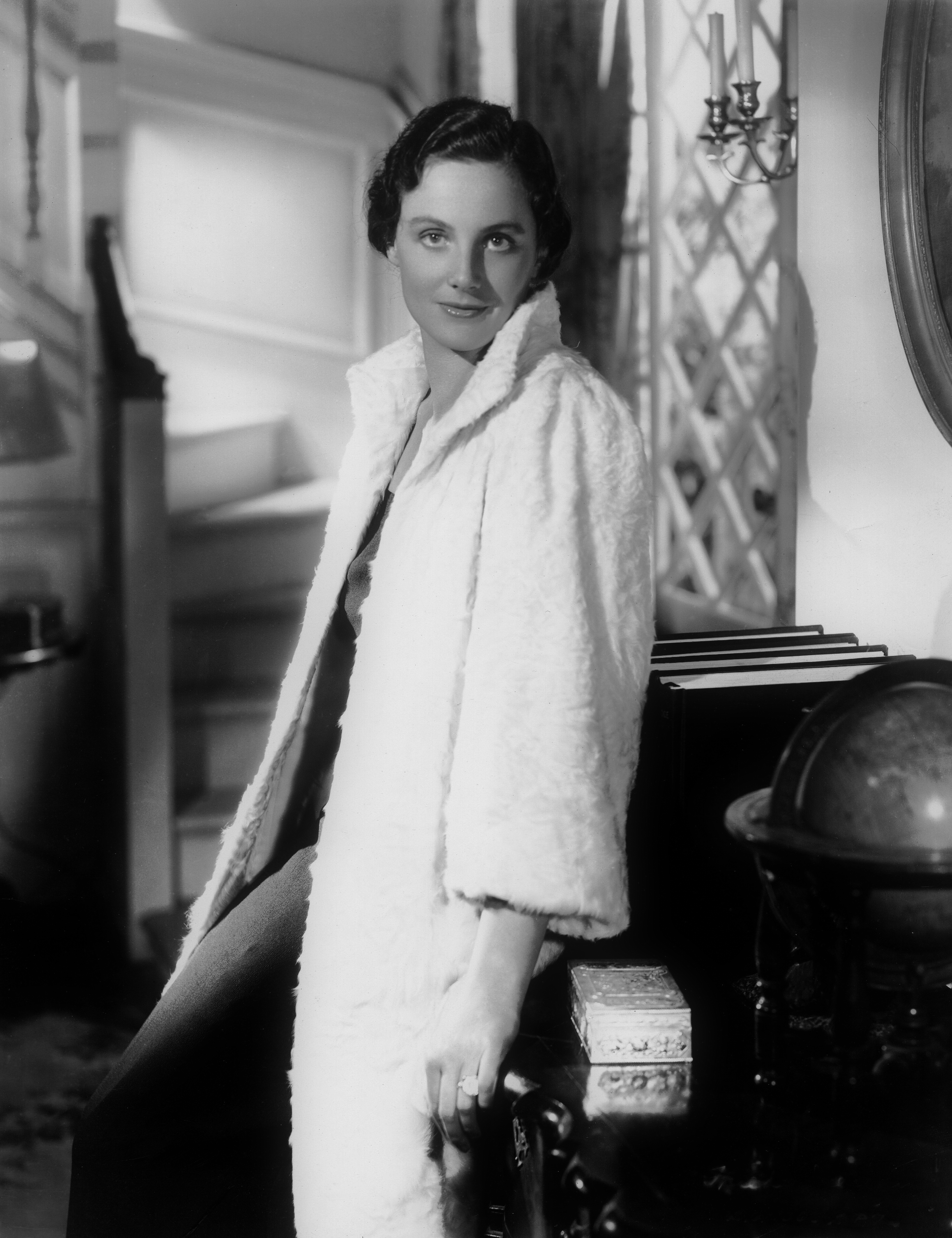
- Frieda Inescort
- Born: Frieda Wrightman; 29 June 1901; Edinburgh, Midlothian, Scotland
- Died: 26 February 1976 (aged 74); Woodland Hills, Los Angeles, California, U.S.
- Occupation: Actress
- Years active: 1935–1961
- Spouse: Ben Ray Redman (m. 1926; died 1961)

Frieda Inescort (born Frieda Wrightman, 29 June 1901 – 26 February 1976) was a Scottish actress best known for creating the role of Sorel Bliss in Noël Coward's play Hay Fever on Broadway. She also played the shingled lady in John Galsworthy's 1927 Broadway production Escape and Caroline Bingley in the 1940 film of Jane Austen's Pride and Prejudice.

== Early years ==
Born in Edinburgh, Inescort was the daughter of Scots-born journalist John "Jock" Wrightman and actress Elaine Inescourt (née Charlotte Elizabeth Ihle), who was of German and Polish descent. They married in 1896 but parted ways when their daughter was still a young child.

While she lived in Britain, Inescort wrote for a newspaper in London and worked as secretary to Lord Astor. (Another source says that she was secretary to Lady Astor.)

After going to the United States, she not only acted but also worked as associate editor of The Exporter's Encyclopedia.

== Stage ==
Inescort's acting debut came in The Truth About Blayds (1922), which was presented at the Booth Theatre on Broadway. Her other Broadway credits include You and I (1923), The Woman on the Jury (1923), Windows (1923), The Fake (1924), Ariadne (1925), Hay Fever (1925), Love in a Mist (1926), Mozart (1926), Trelawny of the "Wells" (1927), Escape (1927-1928), Napi (1931), Company's Coming (1931), Springtime for Henry (1931-1932), When Ladies Meet (1933), False Dreams, Farewell (1934), Lady Jane (1934), Soldier's Wife (1944-1945), The Mermaids Singing (1945-1946) and You Never Can Tell (1948).

== Film ==
Frieda Inescort

Frieda Wrightman adopted her mother's surname as her professional name and moved to Hollywood and made her film debut in The Dark Angel (1935). Her other films include Mary of Scotland (1936), Give Me Your Heart (1936), "Beauty for the Asking (1939), The Letter (1940), The Trial of Mary Dugan (1941), You'll Never Get Rich (1941) and A Place in the Sun (1951).

She appeared with Laurence Olivier and Greer Garson as the conniving Caroline Bingley in the 1940 film version of Pride and Prejudice. She had a leading role in Call It a Day, a 1937 film in which she appeared with Olivia de Havilland, Bonita Granville, Roland Young, and Ian Hunter. In 1955 Inescort appeared as Mrs. Lawrence in the movie Foxfire starring Jeff Chandler and Jane Russell. She appeared in one episode of Perry Mason as Hope Quentin in "The Case of the Jealous Journalist" (season 5, 1961).

== Personal life ==
On 2 August 1961, she and her husband since 1926, Ben Ray Redman, dined out. Redman had been despondent for some time. Returning home before her, he went upstairs to bed. He then called Frieda, informing her that he was depressed over the state of the world and had taken 12 sedative pills. By the time the paramedics arrived, he had died, a suicide at the age of 65. He had been working as a writer for the Saturday Review and was involved in the translation of European classics into English.

Inescort had been diagnosed with multiple sclerosis in 1932. Her disease accelerated after her husband's death, and she was using a wheelchair by the mid-1960s. On 7 July 1964, her estranged mother, British actress Elaine Inescourt, died in Brighton, England, aged 87. Frieda worked as much as possible for the funding of multiple sclerosis research. She was often seen in the Hollywood area seated in her wheelchair, collecting donations outside supermarkets and in malls.

== Death ==
Inescort died at the age of 74 at the Motion Picture Country Home at Woodland Hills, California from multiple sclerosis.

== Partial filmography ==
- The Dark Angel (1935) as Ann West
- If You Could Only Cook (1935) as Evelyn Fletcher
- The Garden Murder Case (1936) as Mrs. Fenwicke-Ralston
- The King Steps Out (1936) as Princess Helena
- Mary of Scotland (1936) as Mary Beaton
- Hollywood Boulevard (1936) as Alice Winslow
- Give Me Your Heart (1936) as Rosamond Melford
- The Great O'Malley (1937) as Mrs. Phillips
- Call It a Day (1937) as Dorothy Hilton
- Another Dawn (1937) as Grace Roark
- Portia on Trial (1937) as Portia Merriman
- Woman Doctor (1939) as Dr. Judith Randall Graeme
- Beauty for the Asking (1939) as Flora Barton-Williams
- The Zero Hour (1939) as Linda Marsh
- Tarzan Finds a Son! (1939) as Mrs. August Lancing
- A Woman Is the Judge (1939) as Mary Cabot
- Convicted Woman (1940) as Attorney Mary Ellis
- Pride and Prejudice (1940) as Miss Bingley
- The Letter (1940) as Dorothy Joyce
- Father's Son (1941) as Ruth Emory
- The Trial of Mary Dugan (1941) as Mrs. Wayne
- Shadows on the Stairs (1941) as Mrs. Stella Armitage
- Sunny (1941) as Elizabeth Warren
- You'll Never Get Rich (1941) as Mrs. Julia Cortland
- Remember the Day (1941) as Mrs. Dewey Roberts
- The Courtship of Andy Hardy (1942) as Olivia Nesbit
- Sweater Girl (1942) as Mrs. Menard
- Street of Chance (1942) as Alma Diedrich
- It Comes Up Love (1943) as Portia Winthrop
- The Amazing Mrs. Holliday (1943) as Karen Holliday
- Mission to Moscow (1943) as Madame Molotov (uncredited)
- The Return of the Vampire (1943) as Lady Jane Ainsley
- Heavenly Days (1944) as Ettie Clark
- The Judge Steps Out (1948) as Evelyn Bailey
- The Underworld Story (1950) as Mrs. Eldridge
- A Place in the Sun (1951) as Mrs. Ann Vickers
- Never Wave at a WAC (1953) as Lily Mae Gorham
- Casanova's Big Night (1954) as Signora Di Gambetta
- Foxfire (1955) as Mrs. Lawrence
- Flame of the Islands (1956) as Evelyn Hammond
- The Eddy Duchin Story (1956) as Edith Wadsworth
- The She-Creature (1956) as Mrs. Chappel
- Darby's Rangers (1958) as Lady Hollister
- Senior Prom (1958) as Mrs. Sherridan
- Juke Box Rhythm (1959) as Aunt Margaret
- The Alligator People (1959) as Mrs. Lavinia Hawthorne, Henry's Wife
- The Crowded Sky (1960) as Mrs. Mitchell

== Television ==
Perry Mason (1961) "The Case of the Jealous Journalist" S5:E1 as Hope Quentin
