= Journey for Margaret =

1942 film by W. S. Van Dyke

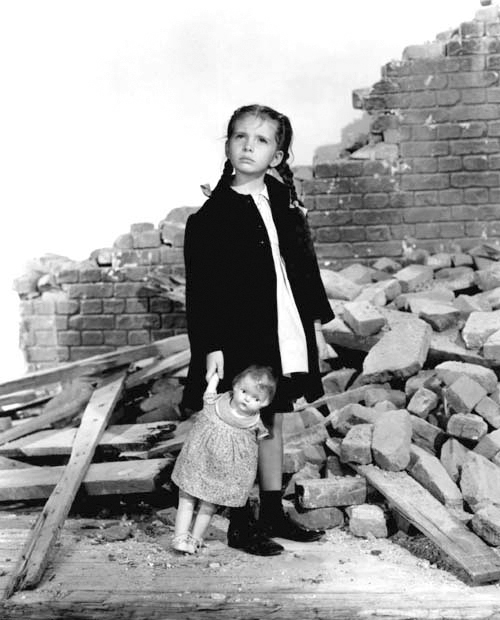
- Margaret O'Brien in Journey for Margaret
- Directed by: W. S. Van Dyke
- Screenplay by: David Hertz; William Ludwig
- Based on: Journey for Margaret; 1941 novel by William Lindsay White
- Produced by: B. P. Fineman; Dore Schary
- Starring: Robert Young; Laraine Day; Fay Bainter; Nigel Bruce; Margaret O'Brien
- Cinematography: Ray June
- Edited by: George White
- Music by: Franz Waxman
- Production company: Metro-Goldwyn-Mayer
- Distributed by: Loew's Inc.
- Release date: December 17, 1942
- Running time: 81 minutes
- Country: United States
- Language: English
- Budget: $484,000
- Box office: $1,534,000

Journey for Margaret is a 1942 American drama film set in London in World War II. It stars Robert Young and Laraine Day as a couple who have to confront the loss of their unborn child due to a bombing raid. It is an adaptation of the book of the same name in which William Lindsay White and his wife described their experiences adopting an orphan in London. This is reflected in the introduction to the film, which begins: “The Margaret of this story is real... “ This was the final film of the prolific director W. S. Van Dyke.

== Plot ==
During World War II, American war correspondent John Davis leaves France for safer London with his wife, Nora, who is pregnant. John wants her to go back home to Connecticut, but she decides to stay on by his side. John is worn down by the war, and Nora has her doubts about his conviction as a reporter.

During The Blitz, John is walking around London in the rubble, moved when discovering a desperate young boy. As he returns home, he learns that his wife has been hurt in the bombings and taken to hospital.

It turns out Nora has lost the baby and is permanently injured, meaning that she will never be able to bear another child. Nora is devastated when she hears the news about her condition.

It takes months for Nora to recover; and, when she does, John tries to put her on a flight home to the United States. She agrees; but John's colleague, Herbert V. Allison, tries to convince her to stay on and fight to get over the ill fate that has befallen her. Despite this, she goes home.

John continues his work writing about war orphans. He meets with the director of the orphanage, Trudy Strauss, and starts caring for the children. He also meets Peter, the boy he saw during The Blitz, who has been mute since he arrived at the orphanage.

John gives Peter a toy he found after The Blitz, which causes the boy to see him as a father figure. Another child, Margaret, comes to the orphanage after being in foster care. She has a bomb casing in a chain around her neck. She has to learn to cry for her dead parents.

At tea time, Peter comes around and starts communicating with the other children. Both Peter and Margaret open up to John in the evening and want him to help them. Later, when bombers fly over the orphanage, John helps calm the children.

London is bombed again during the night; and John and Allison go around looking for stories to write, when they encounter a woman carrying a dead child. John, increasingly upset, is inspired to write stories. Back at the orphanage, Peter and Margaret are to meet their prospective parents. John agrees to accompany them; but they cling to him, even though the potential adopters are very nice.

Via cable, John asks Nora if he can adopt the two children and bring them back with him. Nora's mother answers that Nora is ill but "certain will want children". Nora had a breakdown after receiving his telegram but recovers and writes to confirm she wants him and a home and children, "two, four, ten, bring them".

It turns out the flight from London to Portugal is full. John tries to negotiate with the passengers not to use their full baggage allowance, but it doesn't work. John is allowed to bring only one child and is advised to let the children perform an IQ test to determine which to bring with him. Margaret scores higher, and John must return Peter to foster care. Heartbroken, John still goes to the airport with Margaret; but, when John is about to board the plane, one of the other passengers has given up her baggage allowance to make room for Peter.

Later, after a long trip, John and the children arrive by ship to the port in New York, watching the shimmering lights of the city in the distance. Nora comes to meet them on the ship. There is an air raid alarm, but Nora tells the children that, once the war is over, they will never have to worry that the lights in the city will be turned off.

== Cast ==
- Robert Young as John Davis
- Laraine Day as Nora Davis
- Fay Bainter as Trudy Strauss
- Nigel Bruce as Herbert V. Allison
- Margaret O'Brien as Margaret White
- William Severn as Peter Humphreys
- Leyland Hodgson as Censor
- Elisabeth Risdon as Mrs. Bailey
- Doris Lloyd as Mrs. Barrie
- Halliwell Hobbes as Mr. Barrie
- Heather Thatcher as Mrs. Harris
- Jill Esmond as Susan Fleming
- G. P. Huntley Jr. as 'Rugged'
- Lisa Golm as Frau Weber

== Reception ==
The film was a surprise hit - according to MGM records it made $779,000 in the US and Canada and $755,000 elsewhere, earning a profit of $561,000.
