= William Lindsay White =

American journalist and writer (1900–1973)

William Lindsay White (June 17, 1900 – July 26, 1973) was an American journalist, foreign correspondent, and writer. He succeeded his father, William Allen White, as editor and publisher of the Emporia Gazette in 1944. Among White's most noteworthy books are They Were Expendable (1942) and Lost Boundaries (1948), which was adapted into the film Lost Boundaries in 1949.

== Early life ==
William Lindsay White was the only son of William Allen and Sallie White, born in Emporia, Kansas on June 17, 1900. He had a younger sister, Mary, who was killed in a horse-riding accident at the age of 16 in May 1921. White grew up in Emporia, and worked as a teenager as a reporter for the Gazette. He attended the nearby University of Kansas, and then transferred to and graduated from Harvard College in 1924. He participated in the theatrical activities of the Hasty Pudding Club while at Harvard, co-authoring the book and lyrics of the organization's 1924 show.

The elder White groomed his only surviving child for work in journalism, hoping for his son to succeed him as editor of the Emporia Gazette. He took his 18-year-old son to France to witness the signing of the Treaty of Versailles ending World War I. William Allen White eventually persuaded his son to return to Emporia. Shortly before his father's death in 1944, William Lindsay White took over the Emporia Gazette.

White attended Harvard and there picked up an English accent. Upon his return to Emporia, he wore a monocle and was one of the best-dressed men in the nation.

== Career ==
White served as associate publisher of the Gazette in the early 1930s. He worked for The Washington Post in 1935 and for Fortune magazine in 1937. In 1939 he became a war correspondent for the Columbia Broadcasting System and a consortium of 40 newspapers. The National Headliners Club awarded him its prize for best European broadcast of the year for his editorial "The Last Christmas Tree" from the Mannerheim Line in Finland in 1940. He reported from London in 1940 and 1941 for the North American Newspaper Association and Reader's Digest. In 1942 he became roving editor for Reader's Digest.

As editor and publisher of the Emporia Gazette beginning in 1944, White fought many battles with the city. When the old courthouse needed repairs, the city decided to build a new one instead. White led a campaign to repair the old courthouse and lost. He later angered the local chamber of commerce by opposing tax breaks for companies that relocated to Emporia. He opposed urban renewal schemes that benefited real estate interests and merchants in downtown Emporia rather than the poor in need of housing.

White was also a radio correspondent for CBS News, sometimes filling in for Edward R. Murrow. For most of his later career, William Lindsay White was Roving Editor for Reader's Digest and published numerous articles in that magazine.

White was also actively involved in politics. He served in the Kansas House of Representatives in 1931 and 1932. White also drummed up support for Dwight D. Eisenhower's run for the Presidency in 1952 and supported his friend Richard Nixon's presidential campaign. When Bob Dole first ran for the United States Senate, White threw a dinner party at the Broadview Hotel and invited most of the Eastern Kansas Republican leaders. The dinner was pivotal to the success of Dole's first campaign.

He wrote 14 books during the course of his career, beginning in 1938 with What People Said (1938), which examined the Kansas bond scandal. In 1944, the New York Times described three of his earliest titles as best-sellers: They Were Expendable, Queens Die Proudly, and Journey for Margaret. All were based on his experience as a war correspondent. Three of his books were adapted into feature Hollywood films: They Were Expendable, Journey for Margaret, and Lost Boundaries, based on the true story of Dr. Albert C. Johnston and his African-American family passing as white in New England. They Were Expendable was a Book of the Month Club selection, as well.

He served for a time as an overseer of Harvard University. He was elected to the board of the American Civil Liberties Union in 1950. He became an officer of a group formed to aid Russian refugees in 1951, the American Committee for Freedom for the Peoples of the U.S.S.R.

== Personal life ==
William and Katherine adopted Barbara White Walker, who was a World War II war orphan from a London orphanage, an experience that inspired William Lindsay White's famous 1942 book Journey for Margaret and inspired the film Journey for Margaret.

White's wife Kathrine was born in Cawker City, Kansas, and worked on the editorial staff at Time magazine before her marriage. The couple wed on April 29, 1931, in St. Thomas Church on Fifth Avenue in New York City. The couple maintained a residence in Emporia, and a brownstone in New York City in which they lived for half the year.

White died of cancer in 1973 in Newman Memorial County Hospital in Emporia. His widow and a daughter survived him. Just before his death, the Emporia city commission renamed the 1940 Civic Auditorium in his honor.

== Legacy ==
After White's death, a memorial fund was established in his name to plant more trees in Emporia. By the turn of the century, more than 300 trees had been planted with money from this fund. There is also a bronze bust and a sample of his writing in White Memorial Park at Sixth Avenue and Merchant Street in Emporia.

== Works ==
- What People Said, 1938
- Zero Hour, 1940
- Journey for Margaret, 1941
- They Were Expendable, 1942
- Queens Die Proudly, 1943
- Report on the Russians, 1945
- Report on the Germans, 1947
- Lost Boundaries, 1948
- Land of Milk and Honey, 1949
- Bernard Baruch, 1951
- Back Down the Ridge, 1953
- The Captives of Korea, 1957
- The Little Toy Dog, 1962
- Report on the Asians, 1969
