= Eda Heinemann =

American actress

- Heinemann, from the 1902 yearbook of Smith College
- Born: Ida Gertrude Heinemann; November 10, 1880; Yokohama, Japan
- Died: May 31, 1978 (aged 97); Levittown, New York, U.S.
- Other name: Eda H. Kuhn
- Occupation: Actress
- Relatives: William Heinemann (cousin)

Eda Heinemann Kuhn (November 10, 1880 – May 31, 1978), born Ida Gertrude Heinemann, was an American actress on stage and television. She appeared in almost forty Broadway productions between 1908 and 1963, including plays by A. R. Gurney, Eugene O'Neill, George Ade, Lillian Hellman, Fay Kanin, and Graham Greene.

== Early life and education ==
Heinemann was born in Yokohama, Japan, the daughter of American parents. Her father Paul Heinemann was a tea merchant born in Germany and her mother was born in Wisconsin. Publisher William Heinemann was her cousin. She graduated from Smith College in 1902, with further studies at Columbia University and the University of Wisconsin.

== Career ==
Heinemann appeared in Broadway productions of Electra (1908), Immodest Violet (1920), Chains of Dew (1922), Sylvia (1923), Jack in the Pulpit (1925), Adam Solitaire (1925), Love 'em and Leave 'em (1926), Chicago (1926), The War Song (1928), The Commodore Marries (1929), Broken Dishes (1929), A Month in the Country (1930), Stepdaughters of War (1930), The Man on Stilts (1931), Distant Drums (1932), Take My Tip (1932), Autumn Crocus (1932), Ah, Wilderness! (1933), Geraniums in My Window (1934), The County Chairman (1936), Miss Quis (1937), Madame Bovary (1937), Schoolhouse on the Lot (1938), An International Incident (1940), Boyd's Daughter (1940), My Sister Eileen (1940), Watch on the Rhine (1941), Doctors Disagree (1943), East Stop (1944), Woman Bites Dog (1946), Doctor Social (1948), Goodbye, My Fancy (1948), Arms and the Girl (1950), The Cellar and the Well (1950), Make a Wish (1951), The Potting Shed (1957), Silent Night, Lonely Night (1959–1960), Giants, Sons of Giants (1962), and My Mother, My Father, and Me (1963). In the 1940s and 1950s, she had small roles in dozens of American television programs.

Heinemann taught elocution at Wellesley College in 1908, English at a private school in Buffalo in 1910, and English part-time at Vassar College in the 1920s. The cartoonist Al Hirschfeld made a caricature of Eda Heinemann during her run in Watch on the Rhine.

== Personal life ==
Heinemann married actor and artist Charles Kuhn in 1926. She died in 1978, at the age of 97, in Levittown, New York.
