= Skipper Next to God (play) =

1945 Play by Jan de Hartog

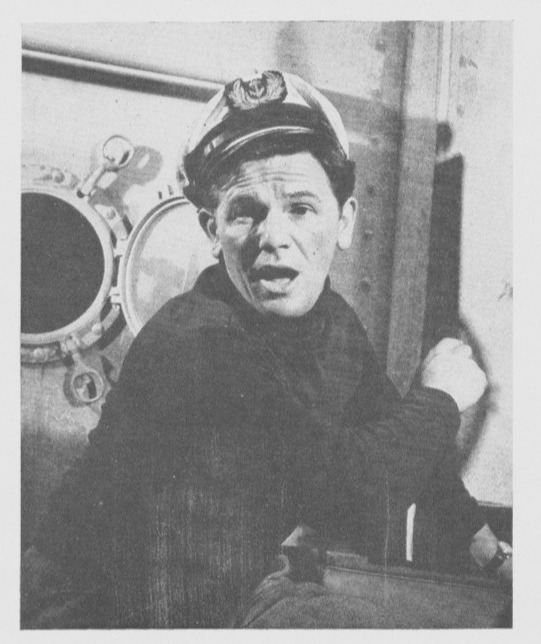
- John Garfield in Broadway production
- Original language: Dutch
- Written by: Jan de Hartog
- Subject: Ship's captain struggles to safely land refugees
- Genre: Melodrama
- Setting: Captain's cabin on The Young Nelly

Premiere
- Date: July 23, 1945 (UK); April 19, 1947 (AU); January 4, 1948 (US)
- Place: Theatre Royal, Windsor (UK); Melbourne Little Theatre (AU); Maxine Elliott's Theatre (US)
- Directed by: Jan de Hartog (UK); Irene Mitchell (AU); Lee Strasberg (US)

Skipper Next to God is a 1940s play written by Dutch author Jan de Hartog. It is a melodrama with three acts, a single setting, and fifteen characters. The action of the play spans two months time during 1938. The story concerns the captain of a Dutch merchant ship who has taken on 146 Jewish refugee passengers from Hamburg, and struggles to find a port in the New World that will accept them.

The play was first performed for underground audiences during the German occupation of the Netherlands. Its first public and English-language performance was at Windsor, England during July 1945. It was revived in London by Anthony Hawtrey during November 1945, and had its Australian premiere in Melbourne during April 1947.

Cheryl Crawford then sponsored the play in Manhattan in early January 1948 as a non-commercial production for The Experimental Theatre. The play was staged by Lee Strasberg with the single setting by Boris Aronson. The star was John Garfield, who took on the role for the same pay as the other actors. Originally meant for a one-week engagement, Skipper Next to God proved so popular with audiences that it was extended three weeks then converted to a commercial Broadway production, where it ran until the end of March 1948. Critical reception was mostly positive, with the New York Daily News including Skipper Next to God among the ten best plays of the 1947-1948 season.

== Characters ==
Characters are listed in order of appearance within their scope.

Lead

- Joris Kuiper is captain of his family's merchant ship, a repentant sinner of deep Christian faith.

Supporting

- Richters is the conscientious and overworked ship's doctor for The Young Nelly.
- Rabbi is the compassionate liaison between the passengers and the ship's officers.
- Chief Davelaar is the rough-edged, blunt-spoken first engineer of The Young Nelly.
- Bruinsma is captain of the Amsterdam, another Dutch ship in South America.
- American Officer is a US Navy officer who boards The Young Nelly off Long Island.
- Dutch Officer is a dry, bureaucratic Royal Netherlands Navy officer.
- The Clergyman is a hypocritical cynic who quotes scripture to counter the Skipper's conscience.

Featured

- Henky is a messroom boy on The Young Nelly.
- Willemse is the ship's doctor for the Amsterdam.
- Officer is a South American military police officer.
- Meyer is the first mate on The Young Nelly.
- Consul is the sympathetic but unhelpful Dutch Consul in the South American port city.
- First Jew is a passenger on The Young Nelly.
- Second Jew is another passenger on The Young Nelly.

Voice Only

- Passengers, six male and four female.

== Synopsis ==
This synopsis is compiled from contemporary newspaper and magazine reviews.

Act I (Interior of Captain Kuiper's cabin, while docked in a South American port.) Captain Kuiper has taken aboard 146 Jewish emigrants at Hamburg on a merchant ship not designed for so many passengers. Their papers are in order, but the authorities in this South American port have sent a military police officer to prevent their disembarking. Richters is concerned for the health of passengers and crew in such crowded conditions. He is being aided by Willemse, who has been sent to the Young Nelly by Bruinsma. Chief Davelaar and Meyer argue with Captain Kuiper about continuing the voyage, and trying to find a safe port for the passengers. The Dutch Consul comes aboard to advise Kuiper on how the passengers might be smuggled ashore, which Kuiper rejects, as it will leave them exposed to arrest and immediate deportation. (Curtain)

Act II (Same as Act I, but while laying offshore of Long Island, New York.) Kuiper has tried three times to enter US ports, but has been blocked by the US Navy and Coast Guard. A US Naval officer boards the Young Nelly to express admiration for Kuiper's cause, but advises him not to try grounding his ship on American soil. Kuiper appeals to his own government, but a Dutch Naval Officer quotes regulations that prohibit such help. A religious man, Kuiper next asks a minister from his own faith for advice. The clergyman matches Kuiper scriptural quote for quote in disclaiming church involvement in the refugee question. (Curtain)

Act III (Same as Act II.) With his officers and crew overwhelmed and rebellious, and the passengers themselves despairing and ready to give up, Kuiper decides on a drastic course of action. An international yacht regatta is occurring in nearby waters. Kuiper will put all his crew and passengers into lifeboats and scuttle his family's ship, forcing the yachts to pick them up. As distressed mariners, they will then automatically be given free entry to the nearest port, succor denied them as refugees. (Curtain)

== First productions ==
The play was written by Jan de Hartog while living under German occupation in the Netherlands. He also wrote Death of a Rat at that time, which would later be known in America as This Time Tomorrow. Both plays were performed for underground audiences during the occupation; on one occasion, de Hartog himself played all fifteen parts in Skipper Next to God.

Its first public and English-language production was for a week-long engagement at the Theatre Royal, Windsor, starting July 23, 1945. Jan de Hartog himself performed, along with Abraham Sofaer, Frederick Piper, Finlay Currie, Reginald Jarman, Julian Somers, and members of the Windsor Repertory Company.

Skipper Next to God was then revived by Anthony Hawtrey at the Embassy Theatre (London), starting November 27, 1945. Jan de Hartog played the title role, while Abraham Sofaer was the Rabbi; others in the cast were Frederick Piper and Michael Clarke. W. A. Darlington thought the play had a fine idea and the skipper was a potentially rewarding part, but that de Hartog lacked the skill and experience to get the most out of either. He conceded that "All the same, I have spent many less rewarding evenings in the company of better plays and better players". Though he knew Skipper Next to God concerned refugees voluntarily fleeing persecution in 1938, Ivor Brown chiefly considered the play from the viewpoint of postwar politics, particularly the settlement of Jewish displaced persons in the Palestinian Mandate. He did give grudging praise to de Hartog's biblical skipper, but thought Abraham Sofaer was excellent "in a part insufficient for his quality".

The Melbourne Little Theatre produced Skipper Next to God in Australia starting April 19, 1947. Frank Thring played Captain Kuiper and Ben Sainken the Rabbi, with Ken Burgess as Bruinsma, Max Bruch as the Dutch Naval Officer, and Lewis Tegart as Chief Davelaar. Irene Mitchell directed, with Stewart Ginn and Barry Gordon also in the cast. This production ran through May 10, 1947.

== Broadway production ==
=== Background ===
The Experimental Theatre was sponsored by the American National Theater and Academy (ANTA), with the cooperation of the Dramatists Guild and Actors' Equity Association (Equity). It produced six non-commercial works for limited engagements at Maxine Elliott's Theatre, which ANTA had leased for the 1947-1948 season. There were no single performance ticket sales; attendance was possible only by membership subscription. However, starting with this season, memberships were open for sale to the general public. All actors, including big-name stars, were paid at a uniform rate of $80 a week.

The Theatre Guild had selected This Time Tomorrow by de Hartog for its own subscription season. After some preliminary tryouts, it opened on November 3, 1947, at the Ethel Barrymore Theatre. Critic John Chapman said there was neither adaptor nor translator listed in the program, so he assumed de Hartog was responsible for the play's writing. The four-character cast (Note: Composed of Sam Jaffe, Ruth Ford, John Archer, and Tyler Carpenter, and directed by Paul Crabtree.) performed well according to Chapman, though in a play full of "frankly hokey writing". Reviewer Arthur Pollock said "Jan de Hartog is not a man of few words", and This Time Tomorrow is a "lumbering, a wordy, and a muddy play". This Time Tomorrow closed after a brief run.

The Experimental Theatre's first production of the 1947-1948 was the Broadway premiere of Bertolt Brecht's Galileo. (Note: It was directed by Joseph Losey and starred Charles Laughton in the title role, with John Carradine, Hester Sondergaard, Wesley Addy, and Joan McCracken supporting..) This play, which had been scheduled to last through December, closed after one week. Their second production of the season, Skipper Next to God, starring John Garfield with Lee Strasberg directing, had been announced during late October 1947. By December 23, 1947, the entire cast for Skipper Next to God was announced along with Boris Aronson as scenic designer.

=== Cast ===
Original cast during the Broadway run.
Role	Actor	Dates	Notes and sources
Joris Kuiper	John Garfield	Jan 04, 1948 - Mar 27, 1948	
Richters	Joseph Anthony	Jan 04, 1948 - Mar 27, 1948	
Rabbi	Wolfe Barzell	Jan 04, 1948 - Mar 27, 1948	
Chief Davelaar	John Shellie	Jan 04, 1948 - Mar 27, 1948	
Bruinsma	Jabez Gray	Jan 04, 1948 - Mar 27, 1948	
American Officer	Richard Coogan	Jan 04, 1948 - Mar 27, 1948	
Dutch Officer	Eugene Stuckmann	Jan 04, 1948 - Mar 27, 1948	
The Clergyman	Harry Irvine	Jan 04, 1948 - Mar 27, 1948	A British barrister turned stage actor, Irvine's later career was replete with roles as clergy.
Henky	Robert White	Jan 04, 1948 - Mar 27, 1948	
Willemse	Si Oakland	Jan 04, 1948 - Mar 27, 1948	Oakland was billed as 'Si' instead of 'Simon' for this production.
Officer	Carmen Costi	Jan 04, 1948 - Mar 27, 1948	
Meyer	John C. Becher	Jan 04, 1948 - Mar 27, 1948	
Consul	Wallace Acton	Jan 04, 1948 - Mar 27, 1948	
First Jew	Michael Lewin	Jan 04, 1948 - Mar 27, 1948	
Second Jew	Peter Kass	Jan 04, 1948 - Mar 27, 1948	

=== Broadway premiere and reception ===
The production had its Manhattan premiere at Maxine Elliott's Theatre (Note: Reviewers at the time labelled this theatre "off-Broadway", the term in 1948 still referencing location rather than capacity, as it does today.) on January 4, 1948, scheduled for a week-long run. One reviewer labelled the play as "strong melodrama", its "plot simple and rarely over-elaborated", as "it weighs such current problems as faith and decency with a righteous indignation".

Robert Sylvester of the New York Daily News said the Experimental Theatre had finally found a success after five previous productions in two seasons. He described it as an "exciting, tense and tragic melodrama", praising John Garfield and seven "exceptional performances" among the other players. (Note: These were Si Oakland, Wolfe Barzell, John Shellie, Jabez Gray, Richard Coogan, Eugene Stuckmann, and Harry Irvine.) Brooks Atkinson called Garfield's decision to appear in this play "quixotic" and said the Experimental Theatre "did itself considerable honor" in producing it. He pointed out that De Hartog did not show the sufferings of the Jewish passengers, only reported it, giving "his play a studious rather than human impact". The religious arguments in the play were subtle, according to Atkinson, and De Hartog complicated a simple plot by presenting them. He praised Garfield's performance and Lee Strasberg's direction, and summed up the play as not perfect but "engrossing, high-minded, and intelligent".

One dissenting view on the play came from George Currie in the Brooklyn Eagle, who decried it as trying to solve the postwar problem of displaced persons, which he felt was tiresome and already too much discussed. (Note: Phrases in his review suggest he may have misunderstood the temporal setting as 1948 rather than 1938.) Another was from Lee Newton in the Daily Worker who thought the Experimental Theatre had taken a step backwards from Galileo by producing Skipper Next to God, which he called "inept". His objections were on dramatic grounds, citing characters such as Henky and Willemse who did not advance the plot and took up stage time.

Irwin Shaw, writing in The New Republic, said This Time Tomorrow was "an unfortunate mélange", but this current play by De Hartog "demonstrates the power a grand theme has to carry us safely past clumsiness and error in the playwright's work".

=== Extended run and change of venue ===
Within a few days the box office was overwhelmed with requests for Skipper Next to God. Blevins Davis took over production chores from Cheryl Crawford once it was apparent the play would be converted to a commercial endeavor. The Experimental Theatre extended the run of Skipper Next to God at Maxine Elliott's Theatre thru the end of January. Their third production of the season, A Long Way from Home, was scheduled to open at Maxine Elliott's in early February, (Note: This was an adaptation of Maxim Gorky's The Lower Depths by Randolph Goodman and Walter Carroll. Their version transferred the story to America with an all Negro cast, directed by Sanford Meisner.) so a new commercial venue was needed. John Garfield had pledged to stay with the production as long as it ran, but he favored Blevins Davis for continuing to produce it, rejecting offers from the Theatre Guild and other commercial producers.

On January 30, 1948, Skipper Next to God moved to the Playhouse Theatre. As a commercial production, the cast including Garfield now received from $150 to $350 a week, individually negotiated. Blevins Davis pledged all net profits would be split between the Experimental Theatre and cast members equally, while he would make good any losses.

=== Closing ===
Skipper Next to God closed at the Playhouse Theatre on March 27, 1948.
