= Robert Turney =

American dramatist

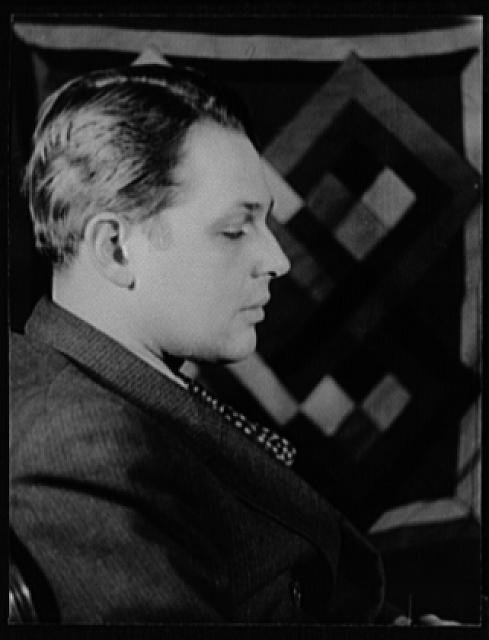
Robert Turney (1935) Photo by Carl Van Vechten

Robert Morgan Turney (1900–1972) was an American playwright who wrote two plays produced on Broadway: Daughters of Atreus and The Secret Room. He was also an actor with the New York Repertory Company.

== Early life and education ==
Robert Turney was born in 1900 to James and Rowena Turney in Nashville, Tennessee. His family later moved to Missouri and then to New Jersey. Robert Turney studied drama at Columbia University and was a member of the Philolexian Society. He won several Philolexian prizes for his short stories and poems and acted in student dramatic productions. He also studied drama at the University of Toronto, and in Paris and Salzburg, Austria. During the Great Depression, Turney was employed by the Works Progress Administration.

== Theater career ==
In 1931 he joined the New York Repertory Company and performed as a supporting actor in such plays as revivals of Henrik Ibsen's Pillars of Society and Dion Boucicault's The Poor of New York.

In 1936, Robert Turney wrote Daughters of Atreus, an interpretation of the Electra legend by ancient Greek playwrights Aeschylus and Euripides with a focus on the women of the original story. The play debuted on October 14, 1936 at the 44th Street Theatre. The script received high praise, with critic George Jean Nathan remarking, "Of the new American plays announced for production this season that I have looked at in manuscript 'Daughters of Atreus' is thus far and by all odds the best." However, due to poor management, the production received mixed reviews, and the play closed after only 13 performances. The play was performed a second time in Reno, Nevada, in 1938.

In 1945 a second play by Turney entitled The Secret Room played at the Royale Theatre. The play was a psychological thriller that revolved around the story of a refugee from Nazi occupied Europe who becomes a governess to two American children. Psychologically damaged by torture and having lost her own child, she attempts to take possession of the family's children. The play was directed by Moss Hart and the cast included the prominent actresses Frances Dee and Juanita Hall. The play received relatively good reviews during its opening in New Haven, Connecticut and subsequent performances in Boston. However, once on Broadway, it was critically panned and closed after 21 performances.

== Personal life ==
Robert Turney met Grace Juliet Chisholm in Paris, France, and they married shortly after. They lived for a time in Juliet's home town of Oakville, Ontario, but soon separated and had no children.

Turney also wrote a short story entitled 'Mahaley Mullins' which was published in the North American Review.

He died in 1972 in Los Angeles, California.
