= Action of Port Cros =

Naval battle in World War II

- Part of the Mediterranean Theater of the Second World War
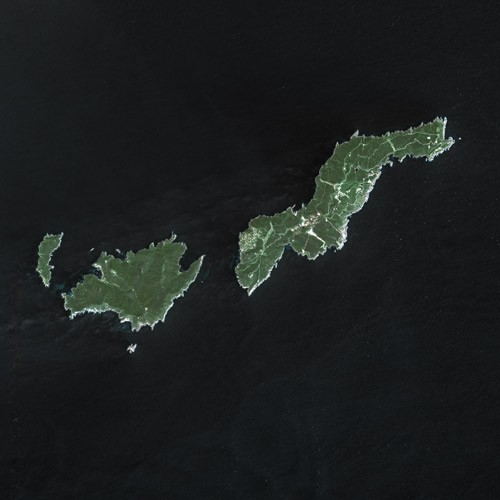
- Port Cros (left) from space and Île du Levant (right).
Date	15 August 1944
Location	Port-Cros, France, Mediterranean Sea 43.005°N 6.398611°E
Result	Allied victory

Belligerents
United States; Canada	Germany

Commanders and leaders
(United States) William C. Hughes	

Strength
Land: 1,800 infantry; Sea: USS Somers	Land: 5 forts; Sea: UJ6081; SG21

Casualties and losses
9 killed	UJ6081 and SG21 sunk; 5 forts captured
- Location within France

The Action of Port Cros (15 August 1944) took place during the Second World War off the French Riviera in the Mediterranean Sea on the island of Port-Cros. The battle began when a United States Navy warship encountered two German warships in August 1944 while supporting the Allied Operation Dragoon, the Allied invasion of the South of France. It was one of the few surface engagements fought between the US Navy and the Kriegsmarine. Later that day, the combined American and Canadian 1st Special Service Force (the Devil's Brigade) was dropped by LST 32 on the main island and captured the German-held positions.

== Background ==
=== USS Somers ===
The American Somers-class destroyer USS Somers—armed with six 5 in (127 mm) guns and eight 21 in (533 mm) torpedo tubes—was cruising in the Mediterranean on 15 August 1944.

== Kriegsmarine ==
The former Italian Gabbiano-class corvette Camoscio of 738 long tons (750 t), had been commandeered and renamed UJ6081 by the Kriegsmarine. Also involved was the former French Chamois-class sloop (Avisos dragueur de mines) Amiral Senes of 917 long tons (932 t), renamed SG21. UJ6081 was armed with a 3.9 in (100 mm) gun and two 17.7 in (450 mm) torpedo tubes. The aviso was armed with two 4.1 in (100 mm) guns. It was early morning off Port Cros, about four hours before the Allied landings of Operation Dragoon, when the Americans sighted the UJ6081. Commander Willam Hughes ordered a torpedo attack and directed his men to battle stations.

== Action ==
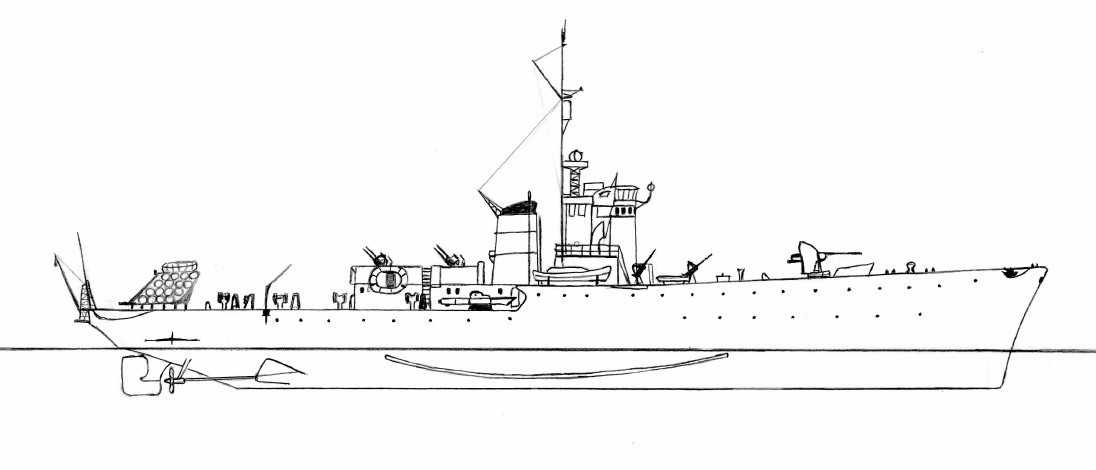
Drawing of a Gabbiano-class corvette

A salvo of torpedoes was launched and the Germans opened fire as they tried to evade the torpedoes. One torpedo hit UJ6081 and she quickly began to sink. SG21 was spotted coming to the rescue and was engaged by Somers' main gun battery. The duel lasted for a few minutes until SG21 was hit several times and began taking in water. Within a few minutes, both German ships had sunk and Somers left the area for naval gunfire support missions against targets along the French mainland. Somers expended 270 rounds and US units suffered no damage or casualties.

=== Land operations ===
Later that day, a mixed regiment of United States Army and Canadian Army infantry, the 1st Special Service Force, was dropped onto Port Cros and captured the five forts after a day-long battle with their German garrisons. The Allies assaulted two or three forts and seized the remaining without resistance. Nine paratroopers were killed in the land battle.

== Aftermath ==
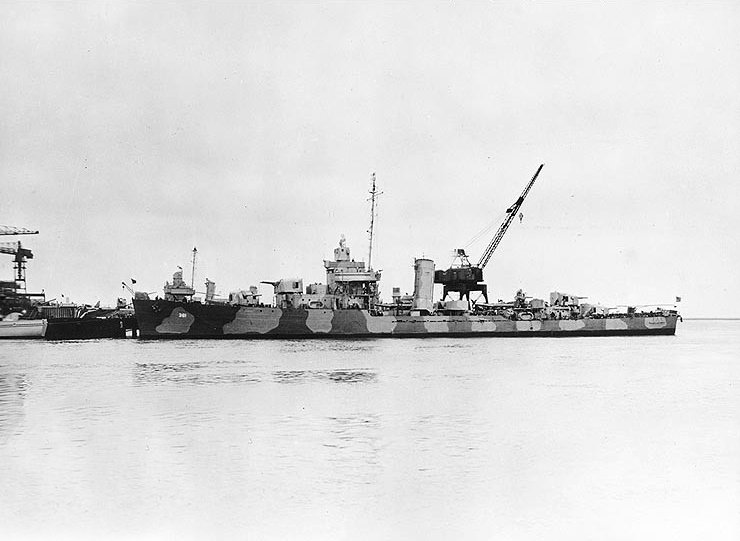
USS Somers in 1942.

After the engagement, the US Army occupied Île du Levant, another island nearby. (Note: Commander Hughes was recognised for his victory and eventually rose to the rank of rear admiral partly due to his involvement in this action.) Two days later, on 17 August 1944, the former Italian corvette Antilope, renamed UJ6082, and the former Egyptian armed yacht Nimet Allah were sunk by USS Endicott with help from two British gunboats at the Battle of La Ciotat.

== Allied order of battle ==
Special Operations Group
Name	Flag	Type	Notes
Western Diversionary Unit (Captain H. C. Johnson)
USS Endicott	United States Navy	Gleaves-class destroyer	Commander John D. Bulkeley
Motor Launch	Royal Navy	Fairmile Motor Launch	4 boats
MTBRon-29	United States Navy	PT boat	8 boats, Commander Stephen Daunis
Air Sea Rescue Craft	—	—	12 boats
Eastern Diversionary Unit (Lieutenant Commander Douglas Fairbanks Jr.)
HMS Aphis	Royal Navy	Insect-class gunboat	ex-Western Desert Inshore Squadron
HMS Scarab	Royal Navy	Insect-class gunboat	ex-Western Desert Inshore Squadron
HMS Stuart Prince	Royal Navy	Fighter Director Ship	Marker ship for troop carriers
HMS Antwerp	Royal Navy	Air Sea Rescue Ship	Marker ship for troop carriers
Motor Launch	Royal Navy	Fairmile Motor Launch	3 boats
MTBRon-22	United States Navy	PT boat	4 boats, Lieutenant Paul T. Rennell

== Bibliography ==
- Gibbons, Tony (2001). The Encyclopaedia of Ships. London: Amber Books. ISBN 978-1-905704-43-9.
- Groner, Eric (1990). German Warships 1815–1945: Major Surface Vessels. Vol. I. Annapolis, MD: Naval Institute Press. ISBN 0-87021-790-9.
- Jane's Fighting Ships of World War II. London: Random House. 2001. ISBN 0-517-67963-9 – via Archive Foundation.
- Jackson, William (2004) [1987]. The Mediterranean and Middle East: Victory in the Mediterranean Part II − June to October 1944. History of the Second World War, United Kingdom Military Series. Vol. VI (pbk. facs. repr. The Naval and Military Press, Uckfield ed.). London: HMSO. ISBN 978-1-84-574071-9.
- Morison, Samuel Eliot (1975). The Invasion of France and Germany 1944−1945. History of United States naval operations in World War II. Vol. XI. Boston: Little, Brown. OCLC 873868430 – via Archive Foundation.
- O'Hara, Vincent (2009). Struggle for the Middle Sea: The Great Navies at War in the Mediterranean Theater, 1940–1945. Annapolis, Maryland: Naval Institute Press. ISBN 978-1-61251-408-6.
- Roskill, Stephen (2004). The War at Sea: The Offensive: 1st June 1944 – 14th August 1945 (Part II). Vol. III (pbk, facs, repr, Naval & Military Press, Uckfield ed.). London: HMSO. ISBN 978-1-84342-806-0.
