= Action off La Ciotat =

Naval engagement part of Operation Dragoon

- Part of the Battle of the Mediterranean of World War II
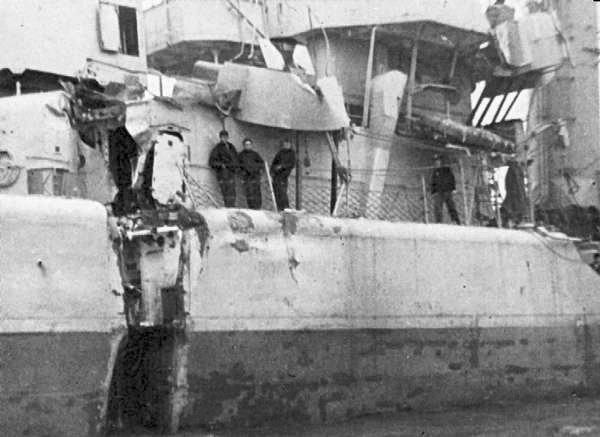
- American sailors examining battle damage to USS Endicott after the action off La Ciotat
| Date | 17 August 1944 |
| Location | off La Ciotat, France, Mediterranean Sea 43°10′37″N 05°36′31″E |
| Result | Allied victory |

Belligerents
| United States; United Kingdom | Germany |

Commanders and leaders
| (United States) John D. Bulkeley | (Nazi Germany) Hermann Polenz |

Strength
| 1 destroyer; 2 gunboats; 17 PT boats | 1 corvette; 1 naval yacht |

Casualties and losses
| USN: 1 man wounded; 1 destroyer damaged | 211 captured; 1 corvette sunk; 1 naval yacht sunk; 1 freighter sunk |

The Action off La Ciotat was a naval engagement on 17 August 1944 during the Second World War and was part of Operation Dragoon. Allied forces, engaged at the main landings in Vichy France, ordered a small flotilla of American and British warships to make a feint against the port city of La Ciotat. The Allies hoped to draw German forces away from the main landing zones at Cavalaire-sur-Mer, Saint-Tropez and Saint Raphaël. During the operation, two German warships attacked the Allied flotilla.

== Background ==
Before dawn on 15 August, a deception operation was undertaken by the Special Operations Group (Task Group 80.4, Captain Henry C Johnson) preparatory to the landings of Operation Dragoon. The Western and Eastern Diversionary units, two groups of ships and smaller vessels simulated landings on the flanks of the true invasion beaches in the area of Nice and Cannes and in the Bay of La Ciotat. The boats towed captive balloons with radar reflectors to make the force appear to be convoys twelve miles long and eight miles wide on those German radars that remained operational.

Aircraft above dropped window; another force feinted towards Genoa. USS Endicott led vessels towards La Ciotat (about half-way between Marseille and Toulon) as the British Insect-class gunboats HMS Aphis and Scarab bombarded shore targets near Antibes. The stratagem at La Ciotat included a decoy landing by 216 Squadron RAF that sent five Dakotas to drop window and use Mandrel jammers against German Freya and Würzburg radars, to appear to be a larger force, then dropped dummy paratroops and pyrotechnics to sound like small-arms fire.

== Prelude ==
=== Allied bombardment ===
On 17 August 1944, Captain John D. Bulkeley proceeded to La Ciotat with a force comprising the destroyer, Endicott, 17 PT boats and the British gunboats Scarab and Aphis. (Note: John Bulkeley rose to the rank of vice admiral in the United States Navy, retiring from service in 1988.) The force was to perform another ruse to convince the Germans that the Allies were going to make a supporting landing along the Bay of La Ciotat. At 6:20 a.m., the ships began to bombard the coast and PT boats simulated a large Allied naval force manoeuvring offshore.

=== Kriegsmarine ===
The former Italian Gabbiano-class corvette Antilope, renamed UJ6082 and the former Egyptian armed yacht Nimet Allah. UJ6082 was armed with one 3.9 in (99 mm) gun, seven 20 mm cannon and two torpedo tubes. Her sister ship UJ6081 had been sunk two days earlier at the Battle of Port Cros. Nimet Allah mounted only a German 88 mm (3.46 in) anti-aircraft gun.

== Action ==
In the early morning of 17 August, at about 4:30 a.m. the weather was good with a slight swell and a 1/3 moon. The two British gunboats engaged the Germans with their 6-inch and 12-pounder guns but the enemy fire was so accurate that they were forced to withdraw. Endicott; the breech blocks on the other three guns had overheated and jammed, leaving one 5-inch gun serviceable. Endicott opened fire on UJ6073 with the gun that was still operational but slower than usual at one shell per minute as the rammer had broken, leaving the crew to load by hand and close the breach with sledge hammers. The third and fourth shells from Endicott hit UJ6073 in the engine room and left it drifting. UJ6073 sank at 7:09 a.m. Endicott suffering one German shell hit that caused minor flooding.

At 6:48 a.m. UJ6082 fired two torpedoes at Endicott that took evasive action, then replied with two torpedoes. As UJ6082 evaded the American torpedoes the US destroyer closed to within 1,500 yd (1,400 m) of UJ6082 and swept its decks with its 40 mm anti-aircraft guns. Endicott closed the range to 800 yd (730 m) as UJ6082 returned fire until another hit by a 5-inch shell near the funnel and bridge. and the crew of UJ6082 began to abandon the ship at 7:17 a.m., UJ6082 capsizing at 8:30 a.m.

== Aftermath ==
=== Casualties ===
The Allied ships rescued 211 German survivors.

=== Subsequent operations ===
On the same day, American aircraft, just north of La Ciotat, dropped around 300 dummy paratroopers and explosive devices that simulated rifle fire.

== Allied order of battle ==
Special Operations Group
| Name | Flag | Type | Notes |
Western Diversionary Unit (Captain H. C. Johnson)
| USS Endicott | United States Navy | Gleaves-class destroyer | Commander John D. Bulkeley |
| Motor Launch | Royal Navy | Fairmile Motor Launch | 4 boats |
| MTBRon-29 | United States Navy | PT boat | 8 boats, Commander Stephen Daunis |
| Air Sea Rescue Craft | — | — | 12 boats |
Eastern Diversionary Unit (Lieutenant Commander Douglas Fairbanks Jr.)
| HMS Aphis | Royal Navy | Insect-class gunboat | ex-Western Desert Inshore Squadron |
| HMS Scarab | Royal Navy | Insect-class gunboat | ex-Western Desert Inshore Squadron |
| HMS Stuart Prince | Royal Navy | Fighter Director Ship | Marker ship for troop carriers |
| HMS Antwerp | Royal Navy | Air Sea Rescue Ship | Marker ship for troop carriers |
| Motor Launch | Royal Navy | Fairmile Motor Launch | 3 boats |
| MTBRon-22 | United States Navy | PT boat | 4 boats, Lieutenant Paul T. Rennell |

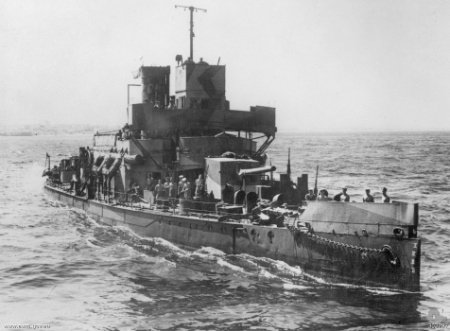
HMS Aphis during World War II

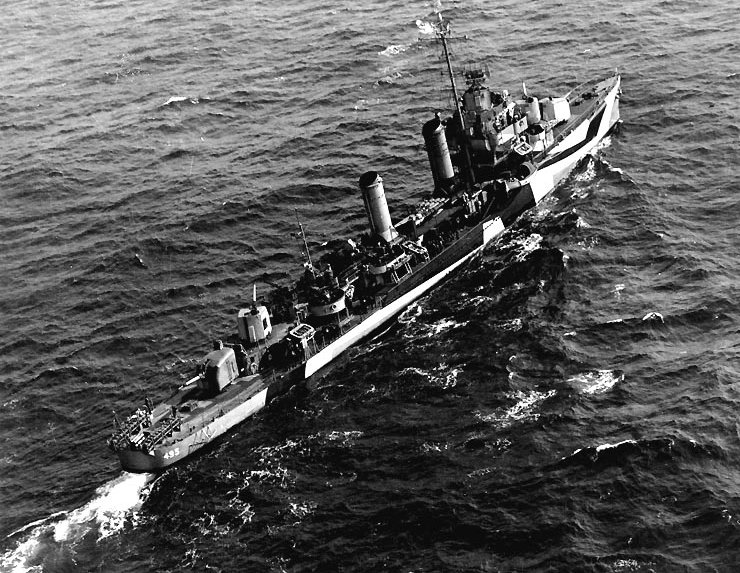
USS Endicott in 1944

== Bibliography ==
- Breuer, William (1987). Operation Dragoon: The Allied Invasion of the South of France. Novato, CA: Presidio. ISBN 0-89141-307-3.
- Fraccaroli, Aldo (1974) [1968]. Italian Warships of World War II. London: Ian Allan. OCLC 464456943.
- Jackson, William (2004) [1987]. The Mediterranean and Middle East: Victory in the Mediterranean Part II − June to October 1944. History of the Second World War, United Kingdom Military Series. Vol. VI (pbk. facs. repr. The Naval and Military Press, Uckfield ed.). London: HMSO. ISBN 978-1-84-574071-9.
- Morison, Samuel Eliot (1975). The Invasion of France and Germany 1944−1945. History of United States naval operations in World War II. Vol. XI. Boston: Little, Brown. OCLC 873868430 – via Archive Foundation.
- O'Hara, Vincent (2009). Struggle for the Middle Sea: The Great Navies at War in the Mediterranean Theater, 1940–1945. Annapolis, Maryland: Naval Institute Press. ISBN 978-1-61251-408-6.
- Rohwer, Jürgen; Hümmelchen, Gerhard (2005) [1972]. Chronology of the War at Sea, 1939–1945: The Naval History of World War Two (3rd rev. ed.). London: Chatham. ISBN 978-1-86176-257-3.
- Roskill, Stephen (2004) [1961]. The War at Sea; The Offensive Part II 1st June 1944 − 14th August 1945. History of the Second World War, Military Series (pbk. facs. repr. The naval and Military Press, Uckfield ed.). London: HMSO. ISBN 978-1-84-342806-0.
- Zaloga, Stephen J. (2009). Operation Dragoon 1944: France's other D-Day. Campaign (No. 210). Oxford: Osprey. ISBN 978-1-84603-898-3.
