= Motor Torpedo Boat Squadrons =

US Navy squadrons during WWII

Motor Torpedo Boat Squadron
- Melville Motor Torpedo Boat Squadrons Training Center sign in 1942
- Active: 1940 to 1943
- Branch: United States Navy
- Equipment: PT boats
- Engagements: Pacific War; North African campaign Italian campaign D-day

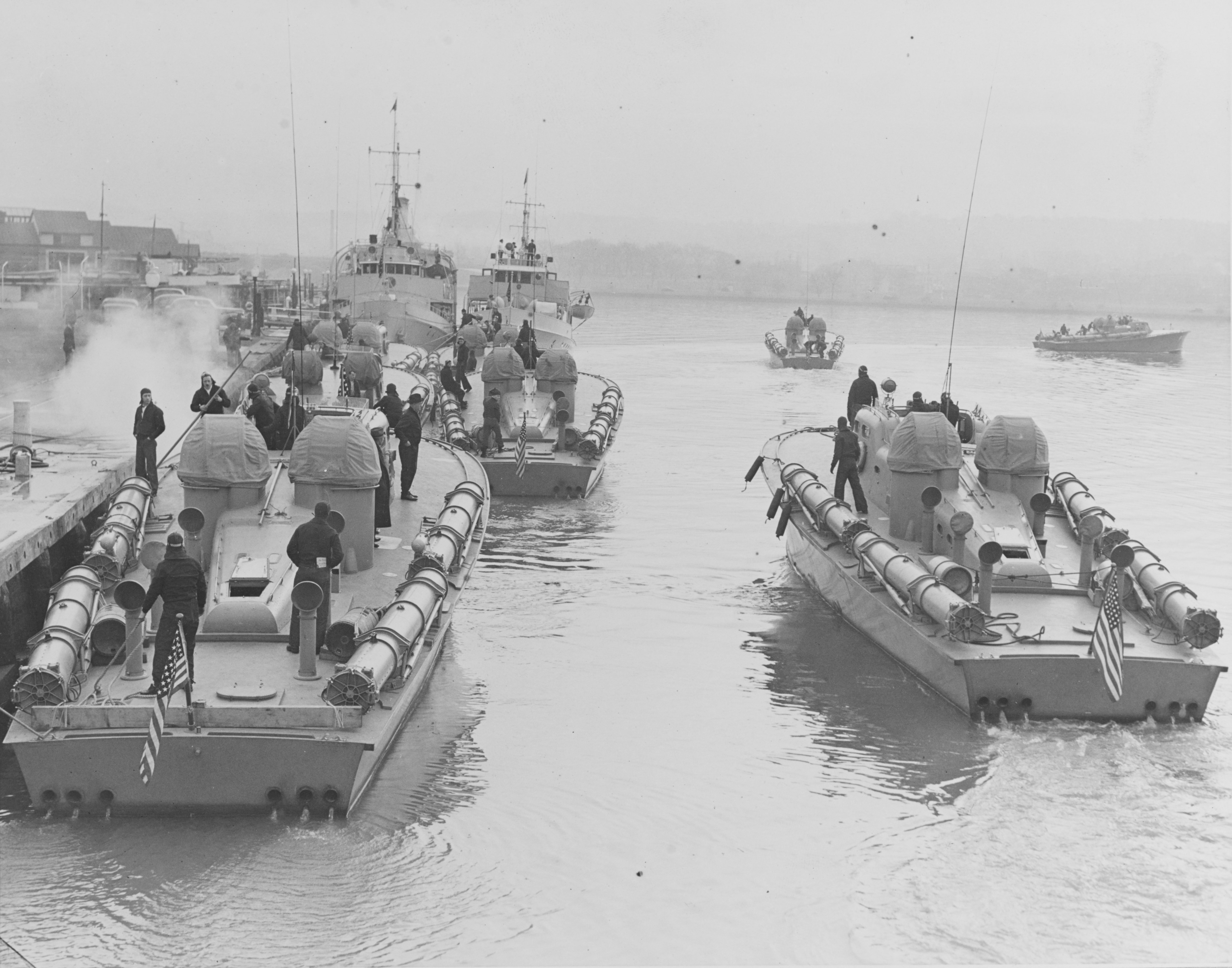
Navy PT Boats of Motor Torpedo Boat Squadron Two, Washington Navy Yard DC December 1940

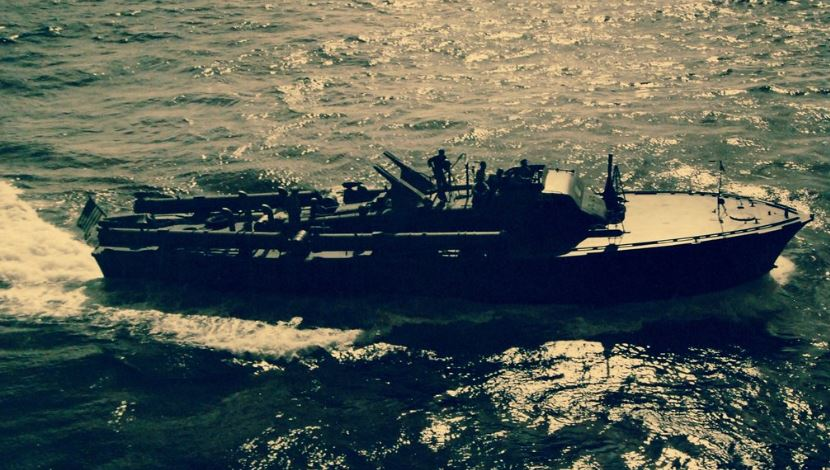
Patrol torpedo boat PT-30

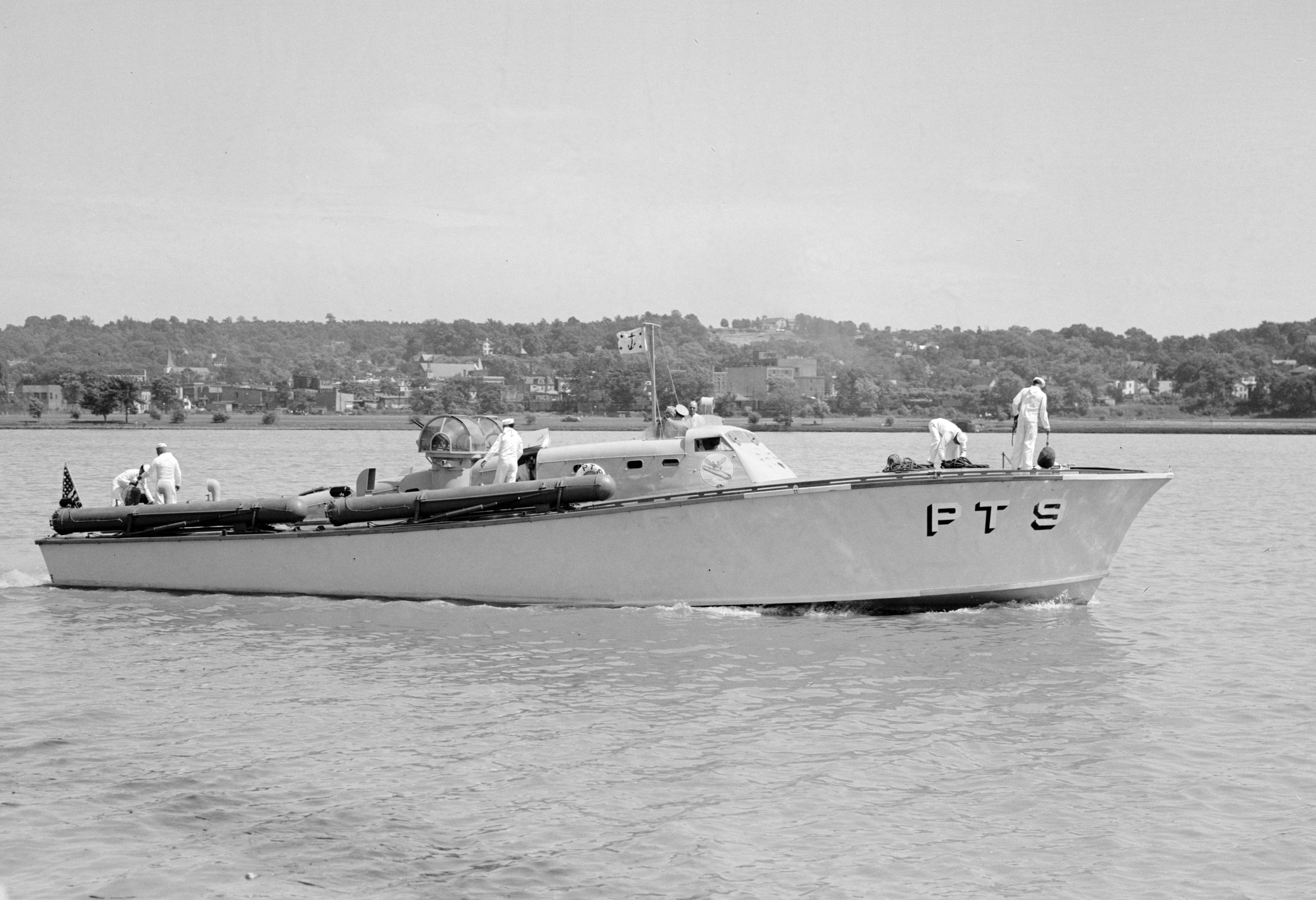
PT-9 torpedo boat in Washington DC in 1940

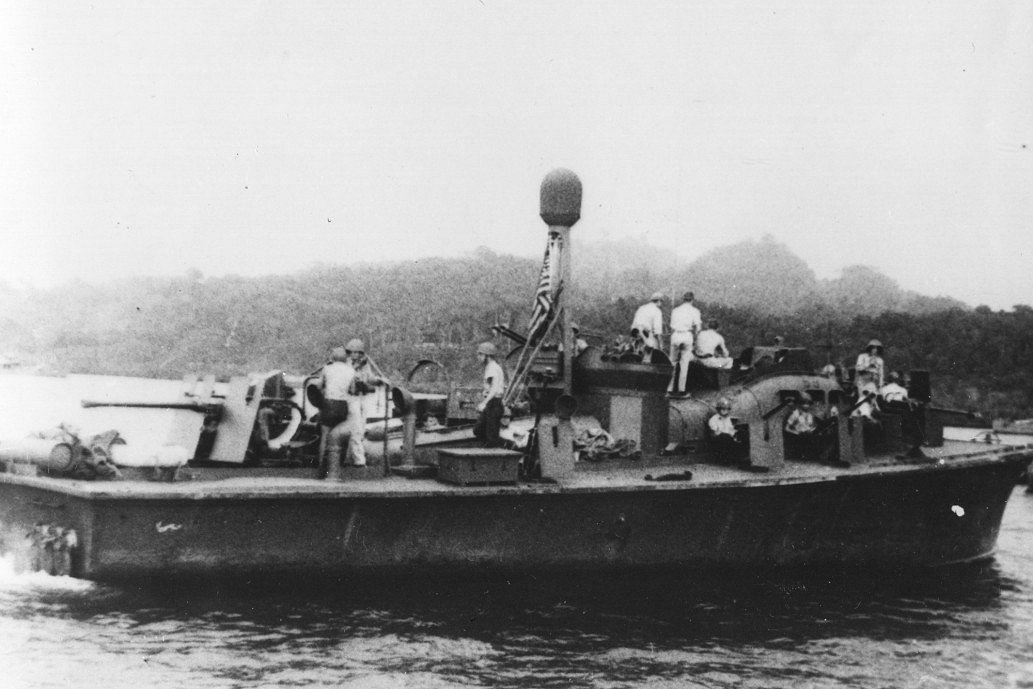
Patrol torpedo boat PT-59 afrer gunboat conversion Solomon Islands

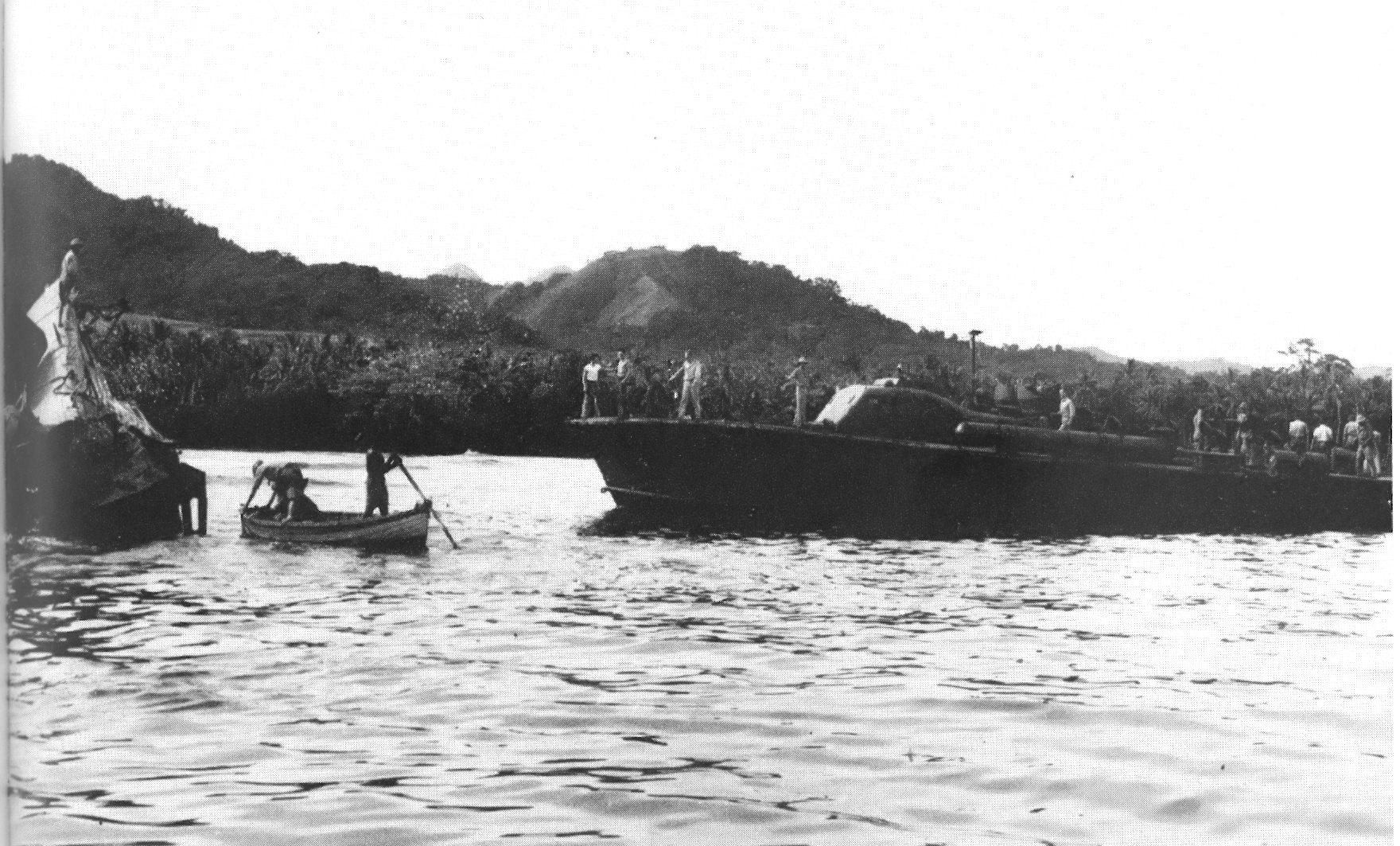
The crew of PT 59 inspects the wreckage of the Japanese submarine I-1, sunk on 29 January 1943 at Kamimbo on Guadalcanal by HMNZS Kiwi and Moa after Operation Ke

Motor Torpedo Boat Squadrons were United States Navy Patrol, Torpedo, (PT boat) squadrons commissioned for operation during World War II. During the war 44 Motor Torpedo Boat Squadrons were commissioned. At the end of the war all 44 Squadrons were decommissioned. In April 1940 the US Navy designed the idea of PT boat squadrons. PT boat squadrons would have 12 boats each with its own commanding officer. The PT boat captains, called officers-in-charge and the boat's crew in the squadron could move from boat to boat within their squadron, depending on availability of boats and crews. Boats could also be transferred from squadron to squadron on an as needed based or to replace losses. A total of 690 PT boats were built between 7 December 1941 and 1 October 1945.

== History ==
In 1938 the US Navy put out proposal requests for a boats that would be fast, strong and heavily armed, a PT Boat design competition was held. From the designs, different shipyards were give contracts for the construction of boats. The Prototype PT boats were evaluated and tested, one test was the Plywood Derby. From these test Elco Naval Division and Higgins Industries were picked. The Test were done by the first two Motor Torpedo Boat Squadrons one and two. With the new boats a new base was built, to train the new Squadrons at Melville, Rhode Island on Narragansett Bay, the Melville Motor Torpedo Boat Squadrons Training Center. Motor Torpedo Boat Squadron 4 was based at the Training Center to train the new Squadrons. The Squadron Training Center's nickname was Spect Tech, after its first commander, Lieutenant commander William C. Specht. Squadrons were send to the Pacific War, which saw the most action; the Pearl Harbor PT Boat Base, the Aleutian campaign; Panama Sea Frontier, based at the PT Boat Base Taboga Island; North African campaign, the Mediterranean Sea, English Channel; and the Mediterranean Sea, working with English troops. Of the many PT boats in Motor Torpedo Boat Squadrons few survived. At the end of the war PT boats were not needed and they used vast amount of high-octane fuel in their large three Packard 4M-2500 engines, so almost all were scrapped at the end of the war. Only about 16 PT Boats have survived from being scrapped. The 16 PT boats vary from running restored boats to just hulls.

== Squadrons ==
Motor Torpedo Boat Squadrons formed during World War II:

=== MTBRon-1 ===
- Commissioned 24 July 1940 − Decommissioned 9 February 1945
- Boats assigned PT-1, 3, 4, 5, 6, 7, 8, 9 PT-20–31, 33, 35, 37, 39, 41−43
- Assigned to Philippines (did not go), fought at Pearl Harbor, Midway and in the Aleutians.
  - Squadron commanders:
- Lt. Earl S. Caldwell: July 24, 1940 – February 1941 − Testing of PT boats
- Lt. William C. Specht: February 1941 – February 19, 1942 − Attack on Pearl Harbor
- Lt. Clinton Mckellar Jr.: February 19 – 24, 1942
- Lt. John Harllee: February 24 – March 12, 1942
- Lt. Comdr. Clinton Mckellar Jr.: March 12, 1942 – May 1943
- Lt. Herbert J. Sherertz, USNR: May–October 1943, Battle of Midway (4–7 June 1942)
- Lt. Edward M. Erikson, USNR: October 1943 – February 9, 1945, Aleutian campaign

=== MTBRon-2 ===
- Commissioned 8 November 1940 – Decommissioned 11 November 1943
- Boats assigned PT-20–26, 28, 30, 32, 34, 36−40, 42−48, 59–6, operated the 70' Scott-Paines until transferred to Great Britain April–July 1941. Assigned to the Panama Sea Frontier in December 1941, six Elcos to South Pacific late in 1942. MTBRon 2(2) constituted with PT 71, 72, 199 for Special operations missions in the English Channel, carried out 20 between May and October 1944.
  - Squadron commanders:
- Lt. Comdr. Earl S. Caldwell — November 8, 1942 to 1940 – May 1942
- Lt. Hugh M. Robinson — May–June 1942
- Lt. Comdr. Alan R. Montgomery — June–July 1942
- Lt. George A. Brackett, USNR — July–September 1942
- Lt. Rollin E. Westholm — September–December 1942
- Lt. Allen H. Harris, USNR — December 1942–April 1943
- Lt. Alvin P. Cluster – April 1943–November 11, 1943
  - Squadron Commanders of MTBRon 2(2): (English Channel)
- Commissioned March 23, 1944 – decommissioned September 21, 1945
- Comdr. John D. Bulkeley – March 23–July 15, 1944
- Lt. Robert R. Read, USNR — July 15, 1944 – February 2, 1945
- Lt. Joseph R. Ellicott, USNR — February 2–September 21, 1945

=== MTBRon-3 ===
- Commissioned August 12, 1941 – All boats expended by April 15, 1942.
- Boats assigned PT-31, 32, 33, 34, 35, 41
- Naval Base Cavite, Philippines, All boats expended by 15 April 1942
  - Squadron Commanders:
- Lt. Comdr. Alan R. Montgomery — July 27 – October 1942
- Lt. Hugh M. Robinson — October 1942 – January 1943
- Lt. John M. Searles, USNR — January–August 1943
- Lt. Richard E. Johnson — August – November 1943
- Lt. Alvin P. Cluster — November 1943 – February 1, 1944
- Lt. Comdr. George A. Brackett, USNR — February 1 – July 22, 1944
- Lt. (Jg.) Jay J. Reynolds Jr., USNR — July 22 – August 7, 1944
- MTBRon-3 and MTBRon-2
- Commissioned 27 July 1942 – Decommissioned 7 August 1944
- Boats assigned PT-21, 23, 25, 26, 36, 39, 40, 45–48, 59, 60, 61
- Philippines (the "expendables") first to arrive at Guadalcanal.

=== MTBRon-4 ===
- Commissioned 13 January 1942 – Decommissioned 15 April 1946
- Boats assigned PT-59–68, 71, 72, 95–102, 139–141, 199, 200, 295, 296, 314–317, 450–452, PT-486, 487, 505, 545, 557−559, 564, 613, 616, 619, 620
- Was the training squadron at Melville Motor Torpedo Boat Squadrons Training Center. In April 1946 MTBRon-4 consisted of PT-613, 616 and PT 619, 620 was transferred to the Operational Development Force.
  - Squadron Commanders:
- Lt. Rollin E. Westholm — January 13 – February 2, 1942
- Lt. Comdr. Alan R. Montgomery — February 2 – May 25, 1942
- Lt. Comdr. William C. Specht — May 25, 1942 – February 20, 1943
- Lt. Comdr. S. Stephen Daunis — February 20 − September 11, 1943
- Lt. Comdr. Francis D. Tappaan, USNR — September 11, 1943 – March 1, 1944
- Lt. Charles E. Tilden, USNR— March 1 − July 15, 1944 * Comdr. James B. Denny — July 15 − September 27, 1944
- Lt. Arthur H. Berndtson — September 27 – October 31, 1944
- Lt. Comdr. Jack E. Gibson — October 31, 1944 – June 15, 1945
- Lt. Comdr. Glenn R. Van Ness, USNR — June 15 – September 17, 1945
- Lt. Comdr. John K. Williams, USNR — September 17, 1945 – April 15, 1946

=== MTBRon-5 ===
- Commissioned 16 June 1942 – Decommissioned 15 February 1945
- Boats assigned PT-62–65, 103–114, 314–319
- In Panama and then from spring of 1943 then to South Pacific, Solomon Islands campaign
  - Squadron Commanders:
- Comdr. Henry Farrow—June 17, 1942 – January 24, 1944
- Lt. Henry, J. Brantingham—January 24 – August 5, 1944
- Lt. John W. Ewell, USNR—August 5, 1944 – February 15, 1945

=== MTBRon-6 ===
- Commissioned 4 August 1942 – Decommissioned 29 May 1944
- Boats assigned PT-115–126, 187–189
- Formed in the South Pacific, Tokyo Express at Guadalcanal campaign
  - Squadron Commanders:
- Lt. Comdr. Clifton B. Maddox — August 4, 1942 − February 1943
- Lt. Clark W. Faulkner, USNR — February–May 1943
- Lt. Craig C. Smith, USNR — May–October 1943
- Lt. Comdr. Richard E. Johnson — October 1943 – May 29, 1944

=== MTBRon-7 ===
- Commissioned 4 September 1943 − Decommissioned 15 February 1945
- Boats assigned PT-127–138
- In the Southwest Pacific, New Guinea: Tufi, Morobe, Kiriwina, Dreger Harbor, and Aitape, and in Philippine .
  - Squadron Commanders:
- Lt. Rollin E. Westholm — September 1942
- Lt. Comdr. John D. Bulkeley — October 1942 – October 1943
- Lt. Edward W. Roberts, USNR — October 1943 – February 15, 1944
- Lt. Comdr. Robert Leeson, USNR — February Is – November 26, 1944
- Lt. Roger H. Hallowell, USNR — November 26, 1944 – February 15, 1945

=== MTBRon-8 ===
- Commissioned 10 October 1942 – Decommissioned 28 October 1945
- Boats assigned PT-66–68, 110–114, 120–122, 129–130, 142−150, 188
- In Southwest Pacific, New Guinea campaign
  - Squadron Commanders:
- Lt. Comdr. Barry K. Atkins — October 10, 1942 − November 1943
- Lt. Robert L. Childs, USNR — November 1943 – February 29, 1944
- Lt. Edward I. Farley, USNR — February 29 – August 22, 1944
- Lt. Robert A. Williamson, USNR — August 22, 1944 – May 16, 1945
- Lt. William C. Godfrey — May 16 – October 28, 1945

=== MTBRon-9 ===
- Commissioned 10 November 1942 – Decommissioned 24 November 1945
- Boats assigned PT-126, 151–162, 187, 318, 319
- In Southwest Pacific: Rendova, Treasury, Mios Woendi, Dutch New Guinea; Morotai, in the Halmaheras; and at Zamboanga and Tawi Tawi
  - Squadron Commanders:
- Lt. Comdr. Robert B. Kelly—November 10, 1942 – January 12, 1944
- Lt. Michael R. Pessolano—January 12 – August 1, 1944
- Lt. Hamilton H. Wood, USNR—August 1, 1944 – March 1, 1945
- Lt. Richard M. Monahon, USNR—March 1 – October 18, 1945
- Lt. Edward R. Burns, USNR—October 18 – November 24, 1945

=== MTBRon-10 ===
- Commissioned 9 December 1942 − Decommissioned 11 November 1945
- Boats assigned PT-108, 116, 124, 125, 163−174
- South Pacific: Rendova, Vella Lavella, Treasury, Bougainvill. New Guinea; Morotai, in the Halmaheras; and at Balikpapan, Borneo.
  - Squadron Commanders:
- Lt. Comdr. Thomas G. Warfield — December 9, 1942 – February 7, 1944
- Lt. Comdr. Jack E. Gibson — February 7 − August 16, 1944
- Lt. Christopher B. Armat, USNR — August 16, 1944 – February 26, 1945
- Lt. Comdr. Francis H. Mcadoo Jr., USNR — February 26 –October 14, 1945
- Lt. Frederick N. Goehner, USNR — October 14 – November 11, 1945

=== MTBRon-11 ===
- Commissioned 20 January 1943 − Decommissioned 11 November 1945
- Boats assigned PT-175–186
- South Pacific: Rendova, Vella Lavella, Bougainville, and Emirau, Halmaheras. Mios Woendi, Dutch New Guinea.
  - Squadron Commanders:
- Lt. Comdr. Leroy T. Taylor — January 20, 1943 – January 22, 1944
- Lt. Leonard R. Hardy, USNR — January 22 – August 1944
- Lt. William S. Humphrey Jr. — August 1944 – January 29, 1945
- Lt. John W. Ewell, USNR — January 29 – July 1, 1945
- Lt. Wendell E. Carroll, USNR — July 1 – October 18, 1945
- Lt. Robert L. Wessel, USNR — October 18 – November 11, 1945

=== MTBRon-12 ===
- Commissioned 18 February 1943 – Decommissioned 26 October 1945
- Boats assigned PT-127, 145, 146, 150−152, 187−196
- In Southwest Pacific, first to have torpedo launching racks instead on tubes. New Guinea at Morobe, Dreger Harbor, Hollandia, and Mios Woendi, and in the Philippines at San Pedro Bay and Ormoc. Kana Kopa, New Guinea
  - Squadron Commanders:
- Lt. Comdr. John Harllee — February 18, 1943 – April 13, 1944
- Lt. Comdr. Robert J. Bulkley Jr., USNR — April 13 – August 4, 1944
- Lt. Weston C. Pullen Jr., USNR — August 4, 1944 – March 7, 1945
- Lt. John J. Mcglynn, USNR — March 7 – October 26, 1945

=== MTBRon-13 ===
- Commissioned 18 September 1942 − Decommissioned 23 November 1945
- Boats assigned PT-73–84
- In Aleutian campaign March 43 – May 44, then Southwest Pacific:Mios Woendi, Dutch New Guinea; Mindoro, and Brunei Bay, Borneo. Dreger Harbor, New Guinea, and San Pedro Bay
  - Squadron Commanders:
- Comdr. James B. Denny — September 18, 1942 – June 8, 1944
- Lt. Comdr. Alvin W. Fargo Jr., USNR — June 8, 1944 – October 15, 1945
- Lt. Comdr. John A. Matzinger, USNR — October 15 – November 23, 1945

=== MTBRon-14 ===
- Commissioned 17 February 1943 − Decommissioned 16 September 1944
- Boats assigned PT-98–102
- Assigned to Panama Sea Frontier, no enemy action
  - Squadron Commander:
- Lt. Richard E. Johnson — February 17 − June 1943
- Lt. Richard C. Morse Jr., USNR — June 1943 − April 4, 1944
- Lt. Henry S. Taylor, USNR — April 4, 1944 – September 16, 1944

=== MTBRon 15 ===
- Commissioned 20 January 1943
- Decommissioned 17 October 1944 − Boats assigned PT-201–218
- First MTBRon sent to Mediterranean, operated western Mediterranean from Bizerte, Palermo Sicily; Salerno; Maddalena Sardinia; St. Topez France.
  - Squadron Commander:
- Comdr. Stanley M. Barnes — January 20, 1943 – October 17, 1944

=== MTBRon-16 ===
- Commissioned 26 February 1943 − Decommissioned 26 November 1945
- Boats assigned PT-71, 72, 213−224, 235, 241, 242, 295−301
- In the Aleutians and Southwest Pacific: Mios Woendi, Dutch New Guinea; Mindoro, and Brunei Bay, Borneo. Dreger Harbor, New Guinea, and San Pedro Bay
  - Squadron Commanders:
- Lt. Comdr. Russell H. Smith — February 26, 1943 − April 1943
- Lt. Comdr. Almer P. Colvin — April 1943 – December 18, 1944
- Lt. John H. Stillman, USNR — December 18, 1944 – February 1, 1945
- Lt. Robert J. Wehrli, USNR — February 1–12, 1945
- Lt. Philip A. Swart, USNR — February 12–22, 1945
- Lt. Roger H. Hallowell, USNR — February 22 – October 14, 1945
- Lt. John V. Mcelroy, USNR — October 14 – November 26, 1945

=== MTBRon-17 ===
- Commissioned 29 March 1943 – Decommissioned 19 November 1945
- Boats assigned PT-225–234
- In Hawaii, the Majuro Atoll, Marshalls and then Southwest Pacific
  - Squadron Commanders:
- Lt. Comdr. Russell B. Allen — March 29, 1943 – May 1, 1944
- Lt. James M. Carnes, USNR — May 1 – June 22, 1944
- Lt. Raymond R. Harrison, USNR — June 22, 1944 – August 13, 1945
- Lt. Julian H. Minson, USNR — August 13 – October 15, 1945
- Lt. James F. Hill, USNR — October 15 – November 19, 1945

=== MTBRon-18 ===
- Commissioned 27 March 1943 – Decommissioned 1 November 1945
- Boats assigned PT-103–105, 147, 148, 362–371
- Southwest Pacific, had action at Dreger Harbor, Aitape, Hollandia, Wakde, and Mios Woendi, in New Guinea; at Manus in the Admiralties; and at Morotai in the Halmahera. New Guinea, and in San Pedro Bay in the Philippines
  - Squadron Commanders:
- Lt. Comdr. Henry M. S. Swift, USNR — March 27, 1943 − December 1944
- Lt. Edward Macauley 3d, USNR — December 1944 – June 17, 1945
- Lt. Comdr. Richard C. Morse Jr., USNR — June 17 − October 14, 1945
- Lt. Raymond S. Patton, USNR — October 14 – November 1, 1945

=== MTBRon-19 ===
- Commissioned 22 April 1943 − Decommissioned 15 May 1944
- Boats assigned PT-235–244
- In South Pacific, was broken up in May 1944, remaining boats to MTBRon 20 and MTBRon 23. Vella Lavella, Treasury, and Green Is.
  - Squadron Commanders:
- Lt. Comdr. Russell H. Smith — April 22, 1943 – February 14, 1944
- Lt. Comdr. Glenn R. Van Ness, USNR — February 14 − May 15, 1944

=== MTBRon-20 ===
- Commissioned 3 June 1943 − Decommissioned 24 November 1945
- Boats assigned PT-235–254
- In South and Southwest Pacific, Treasury and Bougainville, Palawan, Dreger Harbor, Aitape, and Mios Woendi, New Guinea, at San Pedro Bay and Mindoro.
  - Squadron Commanders:
- Lt. Comdr. Glenn R. Van Ness, USNR — June 3, 1943 – January 26, 1944
- Lt. Arthur H. Berndtson — January 26 – July 29, 1944
- Lt. Charles R. Gilman, USNR — July 29, 1944 – January 9, 1945
- Lt. Robert C. Harris, USNR — January 9 – July 5, 1945
- Lt. William W. Stewart, USNR — July 5 – October 15, 1945
- Lt. Edward A. Green Jr., USNR — October 15 – November 24, 1945

=== MTBRon-21 ===
- Commissioned 8 April 1943 – Decommissioned 10 November 1945
- Boats assigned PT-128, 131, 132, 320–331
- Southwest Pacific, Morobe, Dreger Harbor, and Mios Woendi in New Guinea; at Manus in the Admiralties; and at San Pedro Bay and Subic Bay. Kana Kopa, New Guinea, and at Samar and Basilan Island
  - Squadron Commanders:
- Comdr. Selman S. Bowling — April 8, 1943 – January 30, 1944
- Lt. Paul T. Rennell, USNR — January 30 – October 1, 1944
- Lt. Carl T. Gleason — October 1, 1944 – March 3, 1945
- Lt. Comdr. Edward W. Roberts, USNR — March 3 – October 19, 1945
- Lt. Harry R. Hunt, USNR — October 19 – November 10, 1945

=== MTBRon-22 ===
- Commissioned 10 November 1943 – Decommissioned 15 November 1945
- Boats assigned PT-302–313
- Assigned to Mediterranean; Bastia, Corsica, and St. Tropez, France, and northwest coast of Italy and southern coast of France, operating under the British Coastal Forces
  - Squadron Commanders:
- Comdr. Selman S. Bowling — April 8, 1943 – January 30, 1944
- Lt. Paul T. Rennell, USNR — January 30 − October 1, 1944
- Lt. Carl T. Gleason — October 1, 1944 – March 3, 1945
- Lt. Comdr. Edward W. Roberts, USNR — March 3 – October 19, 1945
- Lt. Harry R. Hunt, USNR — October 19 – November 10, 1945

=== MTBRon-23 ===
- Commissioned 28 June 1943 – Decommissioned 26 November 1945
- Boats assigned PT-241–44, 277–288
- South and December 1944 Southwest Pacific; Bougainville and Green Is. Palawan, Mios Woendi, New Guinea, and Mindoro
  - Squadron Commanders:
- Lt. Comdr. Ronald K. Irving — June 28, 1943 − May 1944
- Lt. Alan W. Ferron, USNR — May 1944 – January 5, 1945
- Lt. James H. Van Sicklen, USNR — January 5 – June 20, 1945
- Lt. William E. Stedman, USNR — June 20 – October 1, 1945
- Lt. Donald F. Galloway, USNR — October 14 – November 26, 1945

=== MTBRon-24 ===
- Commissioned 10 May 1943 – Decommissioned 6 November 1945
- Boats assigned PT-106, 332–343
- Southwest Pacific; Dreger Harbor, Saidor, and Amsterdam Island in New Guinea; Mindoro, Zamboanga, Polloc Harbor, Sarangani Bay, and Davao Gulf in the Philippines; Kana Kopa and Mios Woendi, New Guinea, and at San Pedro Bay and Basilan Island
  - Squadron Commanders:
- Lt. Comdr. N. Burt Davis — May 10, 1943 – November 14, 1944
- Lt. Stanley C. Thomas, USNR — November 14, 1944 – January 25, 1945
- Lt. Comdr. Edgar D. Hogland, USNR — January 25 − October 14, 1945
- Lt. Joseph K. Roberts, USNR — October 14 – November 6, 1945

=== MTBRon-25 ===
- Commissioned 17 June 1943 Decommissioned 9 November 1945
- Boats assigned PT-115, 134, 344–355
- Southwest Pacific: Dreger Harbor, Mios Woendi, and Amsterdam Island in New Guinea; Rein Bay and Talasea in New Britain; Mindoro and Ormoc in the Philippines; and Morotai in the Halmaheras. Kana Kopa, New Guinea, and San Pedro Bay
  - Squadron Commanders:
- Lt. Daniel S. Bauchman Jr. — June 17 – November 25, 1943
- Lt. James R. Thompson, USNR — November 25, 1943 – June 8, 1944
- Lt. Comdr. Richard E. Johnson — June 8 – August 23, 1944
- Lt. Wendell E. Carroll, USNR — August 23 – December 7, 1944
- Lt. Comdr. Theodore R. Stansbury, USNR — December 7, 1944 – October 16, 1945
- Lt. Frederick A. Stevens Jr., USNR — December 7, 1944 – October 16, 1945

=== MTBRon-26 ===
- Commissioned 3 March 1943 − Decommissioned 3 December 1945
- Boats assigned PT-255−264 78' Huckins
- Assigned Hawaiian Sea Frontier, No enemy action
  - Squadron Commanders:
- Lt. Robert Leeson, USNR — March 3 − May 1, 1943
- Lt. Anthony B. Akers, USNR — May 1 – December 23, 1943
- Lt. Comdr. Lester H. Gamble — December 23, 1943 – December 3, 1945

=== MTBRon-27 ===
- Commissioned 23 July 1943 – Decommissioned 19 October 1945
- Boats assigned PT-356–361, 372–377
- South and Southwest Pacific: Treasury and Green with Third Fleet, Palau, in the Marianas, San Pedro Bay and Subic Bay in the Philippines, and Balikpapan in Borneo
  - Squadron Commanders:
- Comdr. Clinton Mckellar Jr. — July 23, 1943 – June 28, 1944
- Lt. Comdr. John S. Bonte, USNR — June 28 – November 23, 1944
- Lt. Comdr. Henry S. Taylor, USNR — November 23, 1944 – October 19, 1945

=== MTBRon-28 ===
- Commissioned 30 August 1943 – Decommissioned 21 October 1945
- Boats assigned PT-546–551, 378–383
- Southwest Pacific: Treasury and Green, Lingayen Gulf in the Philippines, Mios Woendi in New Guinea and at San Pedro Bay in the Philippines
  - Squadron Commanders:
- Lt. Comdr. George A. Matteson Jr., USNR — August 30, 1943 – May 25, 1945
- Lt. Donald M. Craig, USNR — May 25 – October 21, 1945.

=== MTBRon-29 ===
- Commissioned 22 October 1943 – Decommissioned 23 November 1944
- Boats assigned PT-552–563
- Assigned to Mediterranean, based at Calvi, Corsica and Leghorn, Italy.
  - Squadron Commanders:
- Comdr. S. Stephen Daunis — October 22, 1943 − November 23. 1944

=== MTBRon-30 ===
- Commissioned 15 February 1944 – Decommissioned 15 November 1945
- Boats assigned PT-450–461
- Assigned to English Channel area, during June 1944 till June 1945, reassigned to states for reconditioning and assigned to Pacific. War ended before shipment to Pacific. MTBRon stayed in New York.
  - Squadron Commanders:
- Lt. Comdr. Robert L. Searles, USNR — February 15, 1944 − October 1945
- Lt. Comdr Lawrence F. Jones, USNR — October–November 15, 1945

=== MTBRon-31 ===
- Commissioned 5 April 1944 − Decommissioned 17 December 1945
- Boats assigned PT-453–455, 462–473
- Served Pacific: Treasury Island Solomons, Palau Marianas, Okinawa June to August 1945, San Pedro Bay
  - Squadron Commanders:
- Lt. John M. Searles, USNR — April 5, 1944 – October 1945
- Lt. Comdr. Frank B. Gass, USNR — October–December 17, 1945

=== MTBRon-32 ===
- Commissioned 10 June 1944 – Decommissioned 18 December 1945
- Boats assigned PT-474–485
- Pacific Fleet Treasury Island Solomons, Espiritu Santo New Hebrides, Okinawa

** Squadron Commanders:

- Lt. Comdr. Robert C. Wark, USNR — June 10, 1944 – October 13, 1945
- Lt. James E. Coleman, USNR — October 13 – December 18, 1945

=== MTBRon-33 ===
- Commissioned 2 December 1943 – Decommissioned 24 October 1945
- Boats assigned PT-137, 138, 488–497
- Southwest Pacific: Aitape, New Guinea; Morotai in the Halmaheras; and San Pedro Bay and Panay in the Philippines. Dreger Harbor and Mios Woendi, New Guinea.
  - Squadron Commanders:
- Lt. A. Murray Preston, USNR — December 2, 1943 – May 5, 1945
- Lt. Comdr. Edwin A. Dubose, USNR — May 5 − October 24, 1945

=== MTBRon-34 ===
- Commissioned 31 December 1943 − Decommissioned 9 March 1945
- Boats assigned PT-498–509
- Action in English Channel area June 1944 to October 1944, prepare boats for shipment to USSR in December 1944.
  - Squadron Commanders:
- Lt. Allen H. Harris, USNR — December 31, 1943 – July 16, 1944
- Lt. Herbert J. Sherertz, USNR — July 16, 1944 – March 9, 1945

=== MTBRon-35 ===
- Commissioned 15 February 1944 – Decommissioned 10 April 1945
- Boats assigned PT-510–521
- Action in English Channel from June 44 to November 44, all boats shipped to USSR.
  - Squadron Commanders:
- Lt. Comdr. Richard Davis Jr. — February 15 – June 11, 1944
- Lt. Comdr. Arthur N. Barnes, USNR — June 11, 1944 – April 10, 1945

=== MTBRon-36 ===
- Commissioned 3 April 1944 – Decommissioned 29 October 1945
- Boats assigned PT-522–532
- Southwest Pacific, Mios Woendi, New Guinea; at San Pedro Bay, Lingayen Gulf and Tawi Tawi in the Philippines and at Tarakan, Borneo
  - Squadron Commanders:
- Lt. Comdr. Francis D. Tappaan, USNR — April 3 – December 1944
- Lt. John W. Morrison Jr., USNR — December 1944 – August 15, 1945
- Lt. Ralph O. Amsden Jr., USNR — August 15 – October 29, 1945

=== MTBRon-37 ===
- Commissioned 5 June 1944 – Decommissioned 7 December 1945
- Boats assigned PT-533–544
- Assigned Pacific Fleet, Treasury Island Solomons, Espiritu Santo New Hebrides, Okinawa.
  - Squadron Commanders:
- Lt. Comdr. Clark W. Faulkner, USNR — June 5, 1944 – October 1945
- Lt. James J. Cross Jr., USNR — October–December 7, 1945

=== MTBRon-38 ===
- Commissioned 20 December 1944 – Decommissioned 24 October 1945
- Boats assigned PT-565–576
- Southwest Pacific: Samar, Basilan Island and Borneo
  - Squadron Commanders:
- Lt. Comdr. Charles A. Mills Jr., USNR — December 20, 1944 – October 24, 1945

=== MTBRon-39 ===
- Commissioned 6 March 1945 – Decommissioned 24 December 1945
- Boats assigned PT-575–588
- Arrived at Samar, in Philippines in July 1945
  - Squadron Commanders:
- Lt. Russell E. Hamachek, USNR — March 6 – September 1945
- Lt. Charles A. Bernier Jr., USNR — September–December 24, 1945

=== MTBRon-40 ===
- Commissioned 26 April 1945 – Decommissioned 21 December 1945
- Boats assigned PT-589–600
- Arrived in Samar in summer of 1945, saw no action.
  - Squadron Commander:
- Lt. Comdr. George E. Cox Jr., USNR — April 26 – December 21, 1945.

=== MTBRon-41 ===
- Commissioned 21 June 1945 – Decommissioned 6 February 1945
- Boats assigned PT-600–612
- Shaking down at Miami when war ended
  - Squadron Commander:
- Lt. Comdr. George E. Cox Jr., USNR — April 26 – December 21, 1945.

=== MTBRon-42 ===
- Commissioned 17 September 1945 – Decommissioned 8 February 1946
- Boats assigned PT-613–624
- Only squadron commissioned after the war; was assigned to Pacific area but never shipped.
  - Squadron Commander:
- Lt. Comdr. James A. Danver, USNR — September 17, 1945 – February 8, 1946

=== MTBRon-43 ===
- Commissioned 12 December 1945 – Decommissioned 16 March
- Boats assigned PT-635–636
- Squadron for testing and shipping boats; boats were set to transfer to USSR under Lend-Lease in April 1945 transfer was canceled due to end of war.
  - Squadron Commander:
- Lt. Richard C. Morse Jr., USNR — December 12, 1944 – March 16, 1945

=== MTBRon-44 ===
Squadron 44 was never commissioned. PT–637–648, 78' Higgins boats were assigned to Squadron 44. The boats were not placed in service. In April 1945 these boats were reassigned. The PT boats were loaded on boat for transfer under lend-lease to USSR, but boat was stopped en route. PT–761–772, 80' Elco were then assigned to Squadron 44, but the contract for their construction was cancelled on August 27, 1945.

=== MTBRon-45 ===
PT-649–660, 78' Higgins boats originally were assigned to Squadron 45. In April 1945, these boats were reassigned, before any had been placed in service, for transfer under lend-lease to USSR. PT–773–784, 80' Elcom were then assigned to Squadron 45, but the contract for their construction was canceled on August 27, 1945. Squadron 45 was never commissioned.

== Gallery ==
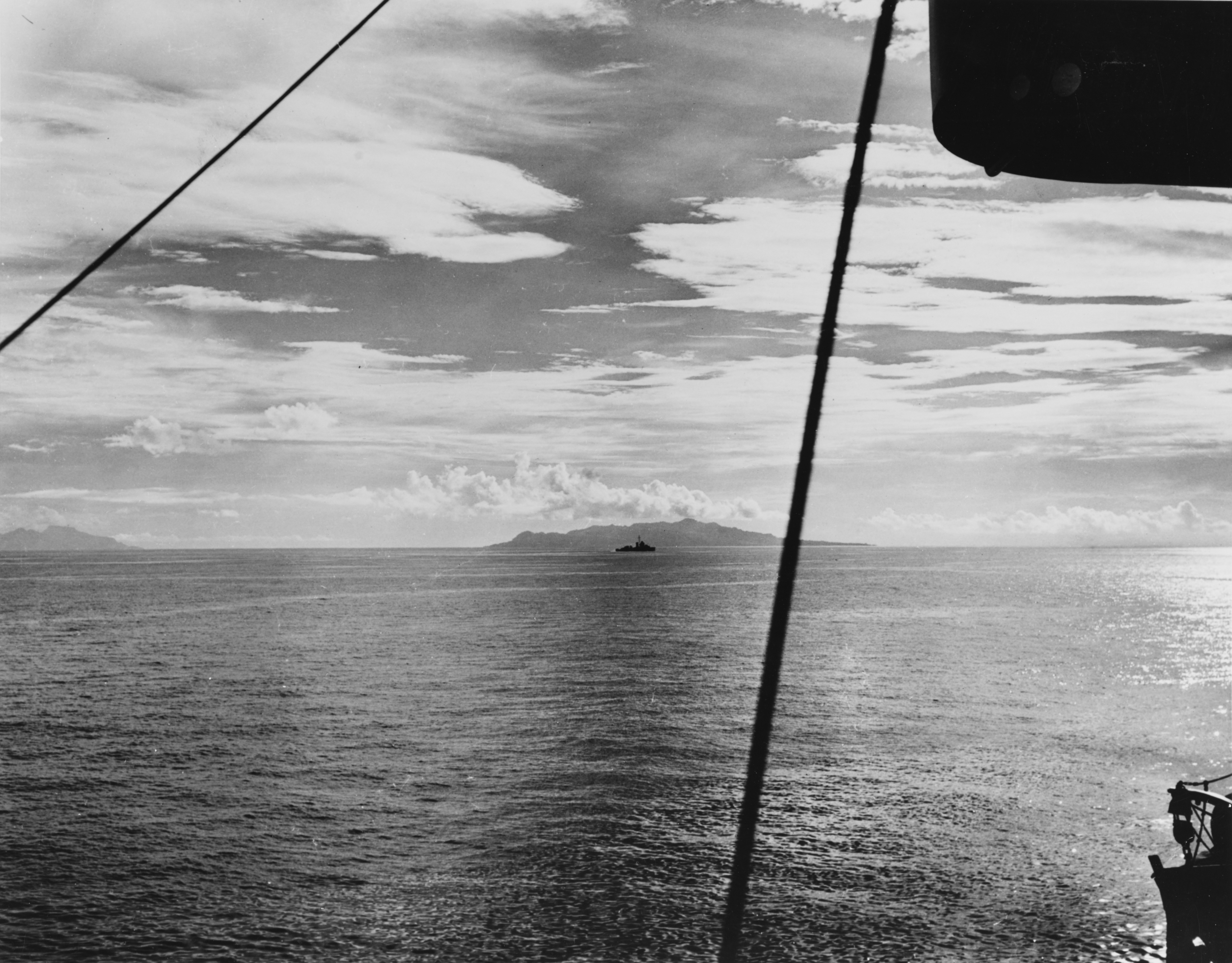
Ironbottom Sound, Savo Island (center), and Guadalcanal (left) on 7 August 1942, the day Allied forces landed on Guadalcanal and Tulagi

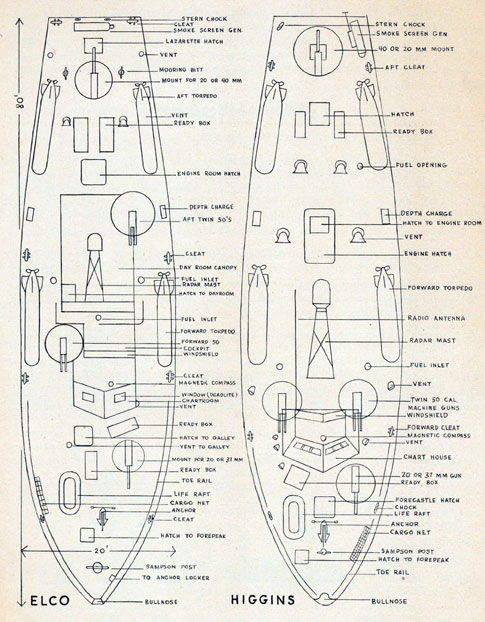
ELCO and Higgins PT boats, Know Your PT Boat US Navy July 1945

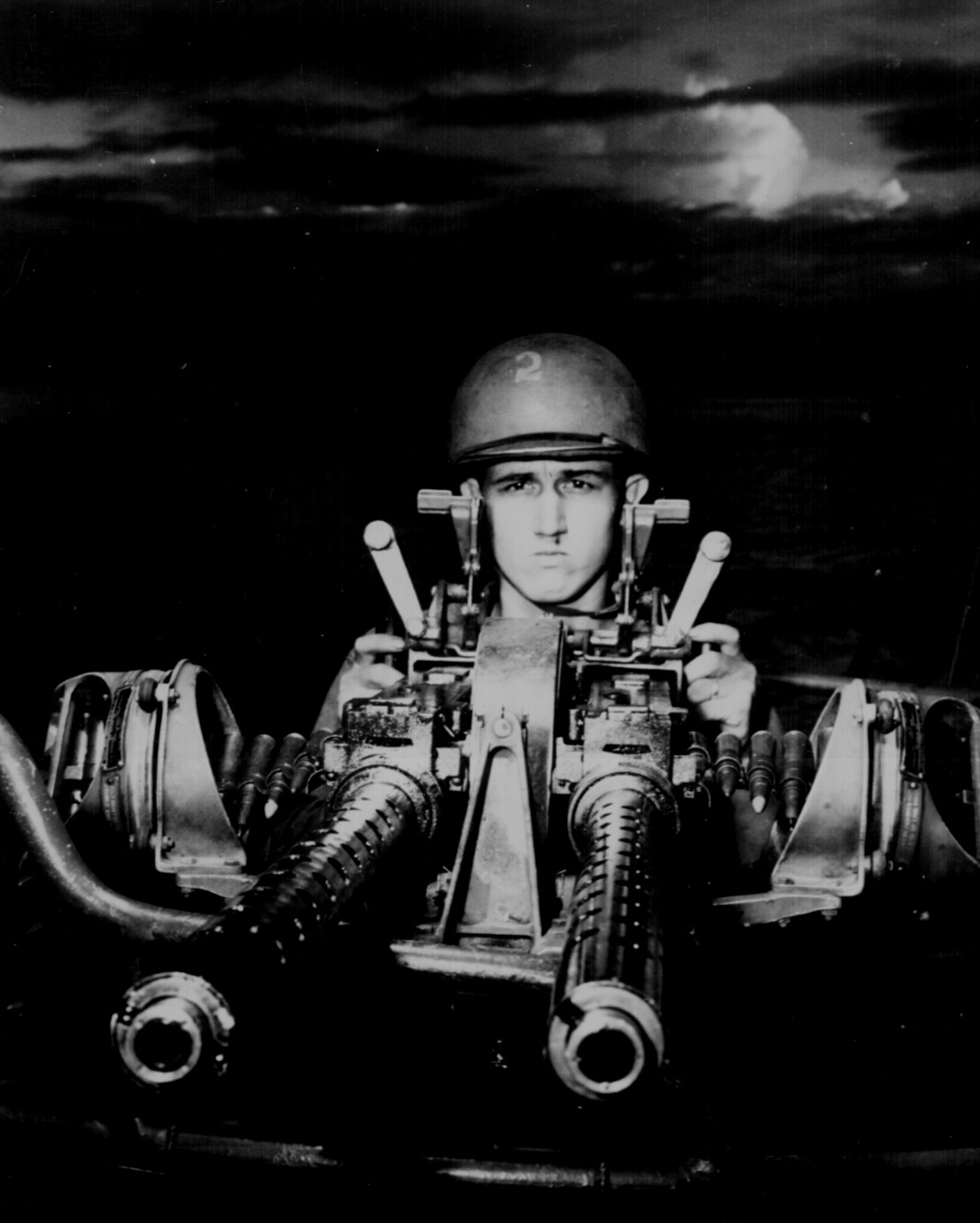
PT Boat 50 cal. gun M2 Browning

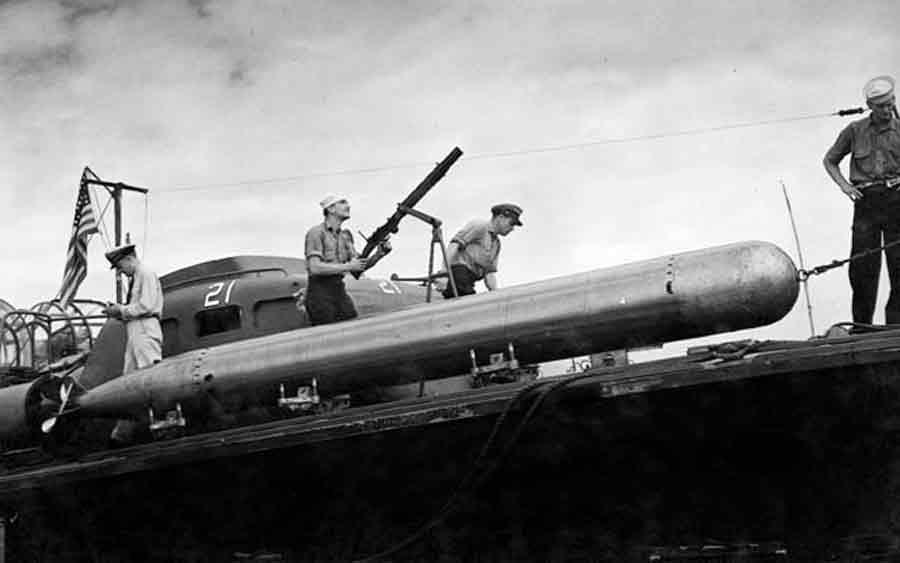
PT Mark 8 torpedo

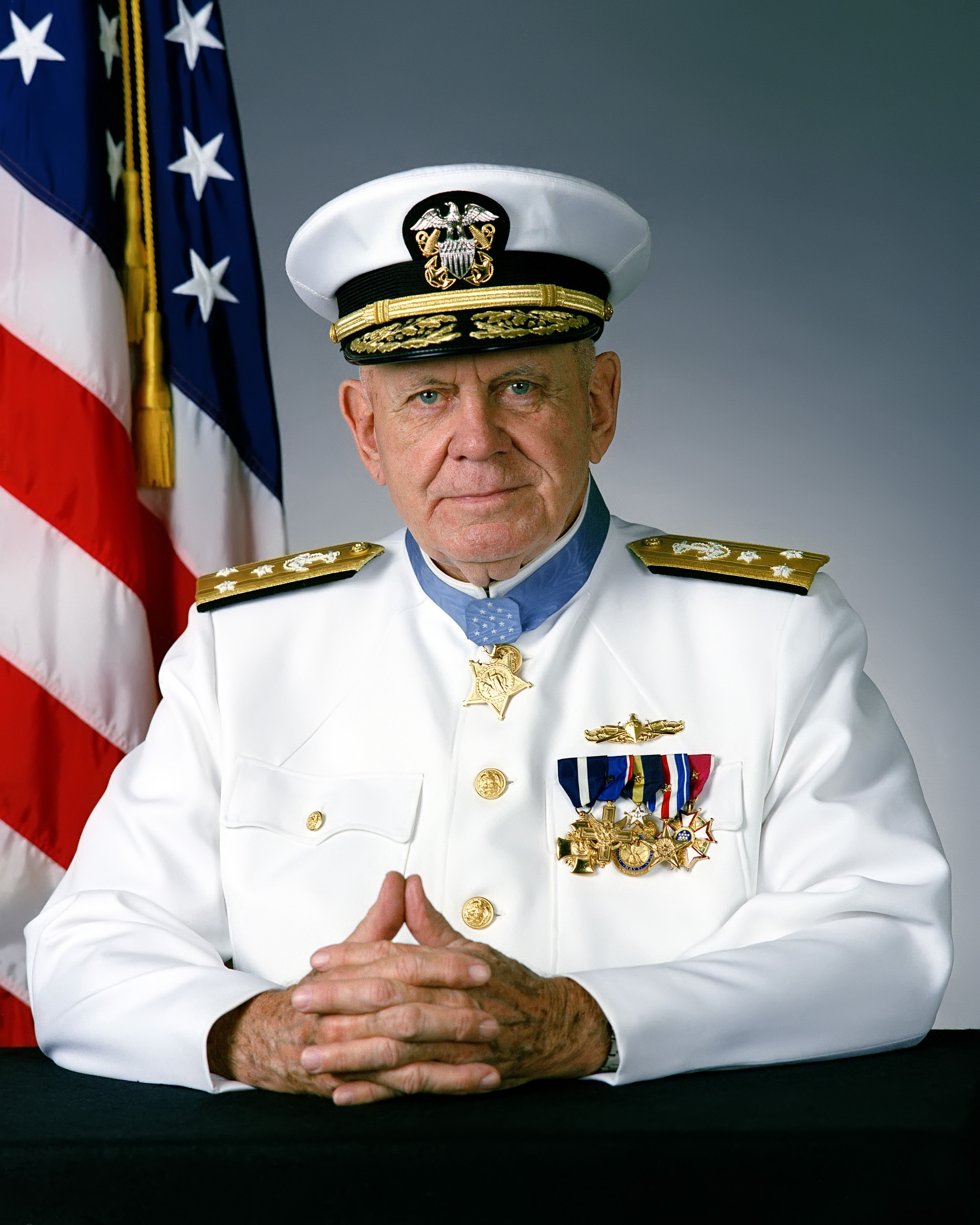
John D. Bulkeley

== See also ==
- New Guinea campaign
- New Britain campaign
- Gilbert and Marshall Islands campaign
- Operation Vengeance
- AirSols
- Battle of the Coral Sea
- Battle of the Treasury Islands

== Bibliography ==
- White, William L. (1942). They Were Expendable. London: H. Hamilton. LCCN 43008243.
- Bulkeley, Robert J. Jr. (2012). "The Fleet Withdraws". At Close Quarters: PT Boats in the United States Navy. Historical Studies. ISBN 9781622800049.
- War Thunder Naval video
