= USS Somers (DD-381) =

Somers-class destroyer

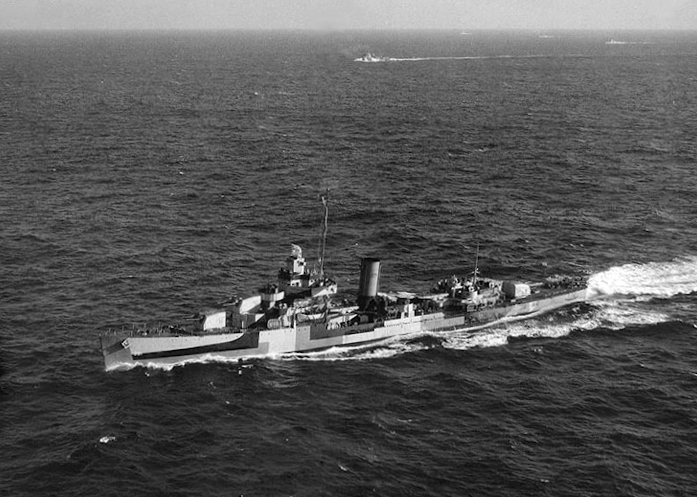
- Somers circa 1944, with mid-war armament modifications including removal of No. 3 5-inch mount and one of the three torpedo tube mounts in favor of 40mm and 20mm guns.

History

United States
- Namesake: Richard Somers
- Builder: Federal Shipbuilding and Drydock Company
- Laid down: 27 June 1935
- Launched: 13 March 1937
- Commissioned: 1 December 1937
- Decommissioned: 28 October 1945
- Stricken: 28 January 1947
- Fate: Sold to Boston Metals, Baltimore

General characteristics
- Class & type: Somers-class destroyer
- Displacement: 1850 tons (2905 tons full)
- Length: 381 feet
- Beam: 36 feet 11 inches
- Draft: 14 feet
- Propulsion: 52,000 shp; geared turbines, 2 screws
- Speed: 39 knots (72 km/h)
- Range: 6500 nm (12038 km) @ 12 knots (22 km/h)
- Complement: 294
- Armament: As Built: 8 × 5-inch/38 caliber guns (127 mm) single purpose (4 × 2); 8 × 1.1-inch/75 caliber guns (28 mm) (2 × 4); 2 × .50 caliber machine guns (12.7 mm); 12 × 21-inch (533 mm) torpedo tubes (3 × 4), 12 torpedoes; 2 × depth charge stern racks; 1944: 6 × 5-inch/38 caliber guns (127 mm) single purpose (3 × 2); 2 × 40 mm Bofors guns (1 × 2); 6 × 20 mm Oerlikon cannons; 8 × 21-inch (533 mm) torpedo tubes (2 × 4), 8 torpedoes; 2 × depth charge stern racks

USS Somers (DD-381) was a destroyer commissioned in the United States Navy from 1937 to 1945. She was the lead ship of the Somers-class destroyer of destroyer leaders and was named for Richard Somers. During World War II, Somers was active in the South Atlantic, the North Atlantic, and the Mediterranean Theater of Operations.

== History ==
Somers was laid down on 27 June 1935 at Federal, Kearny, New Jersey launched on 13 March 1937; co-sponsored by Miss Marie Somers and Miss Suzanne Somers; and commissioned at the New York Navy Yard on 1 December 1937.

In 1938 she transported a consignment of gold from the Bank of England to New York. On 6 November 1941, she and the cruiser USS Omaha captured the German freighter Odenwald which was carrying 3800 tons of scarce rubber while disguised as the American merchantman Willmoto.

Odenwald was taken to Puerto Rico. An admiralty court ruled that since the ship was illegally claiming American registration, there were sufficient grounds for confiscation. A legal case was started claiming that the crews of the two American ships had salvage rights because the Odenwald crew's attempt to scuttle the ship was the equivalent of abandoning her. The court case, settled in 1947 ruled the members of the boarding party and the prize crew were entitled to $3,000 apiece while all the other crewmen in Omaha and Somers were entitled to two months' pay and allowances. This was the last prize money awarded by the US Navy.

In November 1942 Somers, with USS Milwaukee (CL-5) and USS Cincinnati (CL-6), intercepted another German blockade runner, the Anneliese Essberger, near Brazil.

In January 1943 Somers and USS Memphis (CL-13) moved to Bathurst, Gambia in West Africa to support the Casablanca Conference between President Franklin D. Roosevelt, Prime Minister Winston Churchill, and the Free French. At the end of the month Somers relocated to Dakar, Senegal and assisted in escorting the Free French warships Richelieu and Montcalm to the United States. By March Somers was based in Trinidad on patrols to Brazil as before. On 3 January 1944 Somers intercepted the German blockade runner Westerland, which scuttled itself. In May Somers escorted a convoy to England as part of the buildup for the Normandy invasion.

Somers next participated in the invasion of Normandy as a convoy escort and, in August, the Southern France invasion, providing naval gunfire support as well as serving in the anti-submarine screen. On 15 August 1944, four hours before H-Hour, D-Day, along the French Riviera, Somers encountered and sank the German corvette UJ6081 and the sloop SG21 at the Battle of Port Cros. Following this action, she moved inshore to give gunfire support to the invasion. For two days she bombarded enemy strongpoints off the coast near Toulon with 5 inch (127 mm) shells and then exchanged fire with enemy shore batteries east of Marseille. Somers sustained some damage during this action.

For the next month, the destroyer operated in the Mediterranean Sea, visiting ports on the southern coast of France, Ajaccio, Corsica, and Oran, Algeria. She steamed out of Oran on 28 September and arrived in New York on 8 October. Somers was overhauled at the Brooklyn Navy Yard until 8 November, then moved to Casco Bay, Maine, for training. On 23 November, she joined the screen of a Britain bound convoy for the first of four transatlantic voyages which closed Somers' combat service. She returned to the United States on 12 May 1945 at the end of her last voyage to the United Kingdom. For the remainder of the war, Somers operated along the eastern seaboard and, in July, made one summer cruise to the Caribbean to train midshipmen.

== Fate ==
On 4 August 1945, she put into Charleston, South Carolina, for overhaul and remained until 11 September. Instead of returning to active duty, Somers reported to the Commandant, 6th Naval District, for decommissioning and disposal. She decommissioned at Charleston on 28 October 1945 and was retained there until removed by her purchaser, Boston Metals of Baltimore, Md., on 16 May 1947. Somers was struck from the Navy list on 28 January 1947.

== Honors ==
Somers earned two battle stars during World War II.

== See also ==
- List of destroyers of the United States Navy
