= John D. Bulkeley =

United States Navy admiral and Medal of Honor recipient (1911–1996)

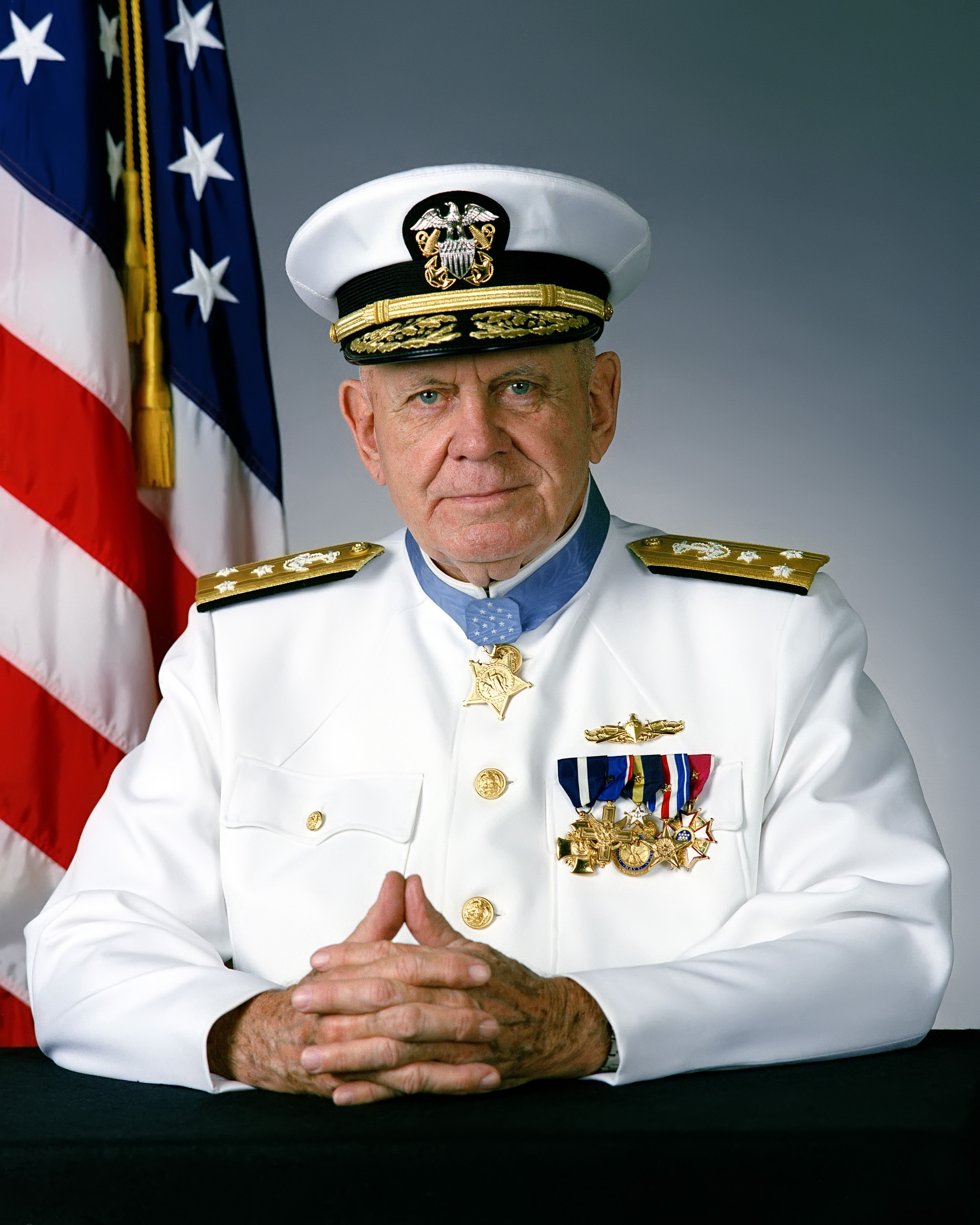
- Vice Admiral John D. Bulkeley
- Born: 19 August 1911; New York City, US
- Died: 6 April 1996 (aged 84); Silver Spring, Maryland, US
- Burial place: Arlington National Cemetery
- Military career
- Allegiance: United States
- Branch: United States Navy
- Service years: 1933–1988
- Rank: Vice Admiral
- Nickname: "Sea Wolf"
- Service number: 0-72460
- Commands: Motor Torpedo Boat Subchaser Squadron One; Motor Torpedo Boat Squadron Three; Motor Torpedo Boat Squadron Seven; Motor Torpedo Boat Squadron Two; Motor Torpedo Boat Squadrons-Europe; USS Endicott; USS Stribling; Destroyer Division 132; USS Tolovana; Destroyer Squadron Twelve; Clarksville Nuclear Modification Center; Cruiser-Destroyer Flotilla Eight; Guantanamo Bay Naval Base
- Conflicts: World War II; Battle of the Philippines; Douglas MacArthur's escape from the Philippines; Operation Overlord; Battle of La Ciotat; Korean War
- Awards: Medal of Honor; Navy Cross; Distinguished Service Cross (2); Navy Distinguished Service Medal (3); Silver Star (2); Legion of Merit (2); Purple Heart (2); Croix de Guerre (France); Distinguished Conduct Star (Philippines)

John Duncan Bulkeley (19 August 1911 – 6 April 1996) was a vice admiral in the United States Navy and was one of its most decorated officers. Bulkeley received the Medal of Honor for actions in the Pacific Theater during World War II. He was also the PT boat skipper who evacuated General Douglas MacArthur from Corregidor in the Philippines and commanded at the Battle of La Ciotat.

Bulkeley's PT-boat heroics in defending the Philippines from Japanese invasion in 1941-1942 were the subject of the 1942 novel "They Were Expendable" by William Lindsay White. White's book was turned into the 1945 big screen epic They Were Expendable, by director John Ford, starring John Wayne, with Robert Montgomery playing a somewhat fictionalized Bulkeley role.

The United States Navy named an Arleigh Burke-class guided missile destroyer after him: USS Bulkeley (DDG-84), commissioned in 2001.

== Early life and career ==
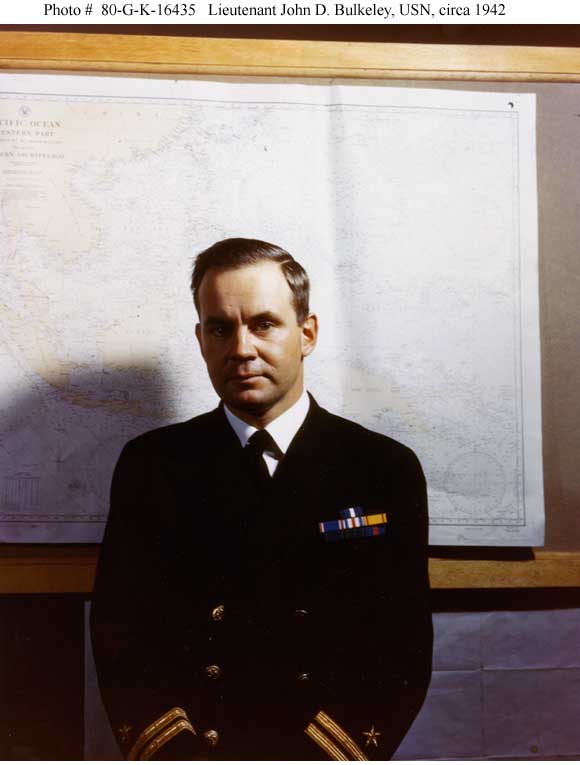
Bulkeley as a lieutenant in the Navy

Bulkeley was born in New York City and grew up on a farm in Mansfield Township, Warren County, New Jersey, and graduated in 1928 from Hackettstown High School. He was a 1933 graduate of the United States Naval Academy.

== Military career ==
In December 1936, he was assigned to the United States Asiatic Fleet where he was appointed as engineering officer onboard USS Sacramento in China and witnessed the Japanese invasions of the Chinese cities of Shantou and Shanghai, and the USS Panay incident during the Second Sino-Japanese War.

=== World War II ===
At the dawn of World War II, Bulkeley was a lieutenant in command of Motor Torpedo Boat Squadron Three, a Philippines-based detachment of six motor torpedo boats. He hit his stride as a daring, resourceful and courageous leader. On 11 March 1942, he picked up General Douglas MacArthur, his family, and his immediate staff, who had been ordered to flee the Philippines, and took them aboard PT-41 and other 77-foot (23 m) motor torpedo boats through over 600 nautical miles (1,000 km) of open ocean. On arriving at Mindanao, MacArthur said, "You have taken me out of the jaws of death. I shall never forget it." Bulkeley earned many of his array of decorations while in command of that squadron and a subsequent one. He was evacuated to Australia by a B-17 aircraft in the final days of the campaign.

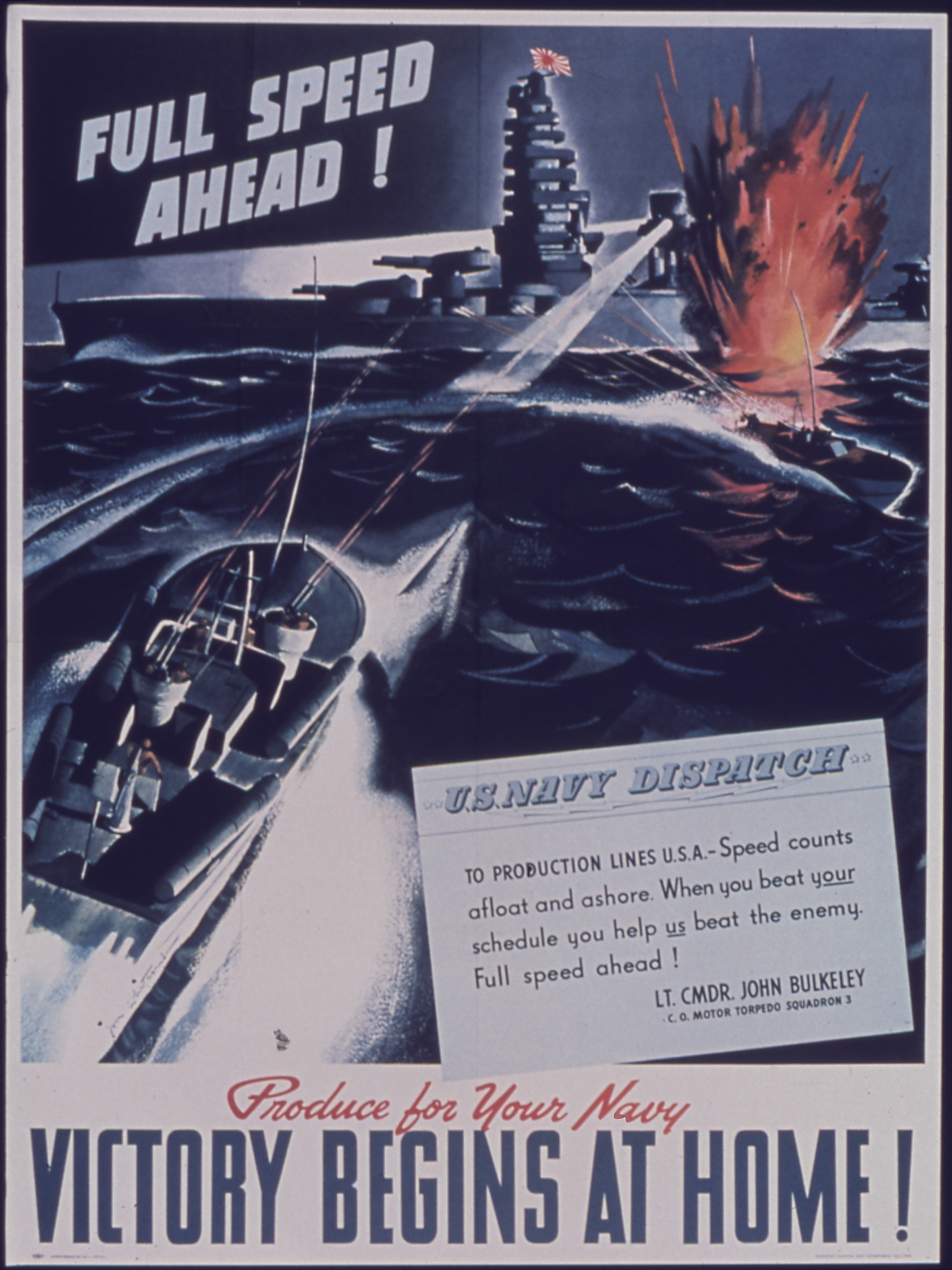
WWII poster with quote from John D. Bulkeley

In September 1942, while back in the United States helping to raise War Bonds as a lieutenant commander, he met former Ambassador to Britain Joseph Kennedy at New York's Plaza Hotel, and shortly after was instrumental in recruiting Lieutenant John F. Kennedy into the Navy's Motor Torpedo Boat Training Center (MTBTC) at Mellville, Rhode Island. Kennedy's command of PT-109 would help to launch his first campaign for the United States Congress.

In 1944, he took part in the Normandy invasion. Bulkeley led torpedo boats and minesweepers in clearing the lanes to Utah Beach, keeping German E-boats from attacking the landing ships along the Mason Line, and picking up wounded sailors from the sinking minesweeper USS Tide, destroyer escort USS Rich, and destroyer USS Corry. As invasion operations wound down, he received command of his first large ship, the destroyer USS Endicott. In August 1944, Bulkeley was appointed to take charge of a diversion raid against the port of La Ciotat, an action that led to the Battle of La Ciotat. The two British gunboats under his command came under accurate fire from a German corvette and armed yacht. Charging in with only one gun working, he engaged both enemy vessels at point-blank range, sinking both. Afterwards, Bulkeley rescued the British sailors in the water and then rescued many of the German sailors as well. Later, he said, "What else could I do? You engage, you fight, you win. That is the reputation of our Navy, then and in the future."

== Cold War ==
During the Korean War in 1952, Bulkeley commanded Destroyer Division 132. After the war, he was Chief of Staff for Cruiser Division Five.

In the early 1960s, Bulkeley commanded Clarksville Base, Tennessee, then a tri-service command under the aegis of the Defense Atomic Support Agency. Having lost none of his wartime daring, Bulkeley was known to test the alertness of the Marines guarding the base by donning a ninja suit, blackening his face and endeavoring to penetrate the classified area after dark without detection. This was a dangerous endeavor, as the Marines carried loaded weapons. Ever popular with his men, who both respected and admired him, Bulkeley could be seen driving around the base in his fire-engine red Triumph TR3 sports car with a large silver PT boat as a hood ornament.

Promoted to rear admiral by President John F. Kennedy, who commanded PT-109 during World War II, Bulkeley was dispatched to command the Guantanamo Bay Naval Base in Cuba, where he met Cuba's threat to sever water supplies in response to the Bay of Pigs invasion and other assaults by ordering the installation of desalinization equipment to make the base self-sufficient.

== Retirement and return to duty ==
Bulkeley retired from active duty in 1975. However, he was recalled to active duty in a retired-retained status in order to serve as the commander of the Navy's Board of Inspection and Survey (INSURV) which conducts inspections and surveys of U.S. naval vessels before their commissioning and deployment. In 1986, Bulkeley conducted an inspection of the battleship USS Iowa, finding numerous deficiencies and recommending it be taken out of service immediately. His advice was not heeded, and three years later, it suffered a turret explosion, killing 47 crewmen. Later promoted to vice admiral, Bulkeley retired from the Navy in 1988, after 55 years of service.

== Personal life ==
On 6 April 1996, Bulkeley died at his home in Silver Spring, Maryland, at age 84. He was buried at Arlington National Cemetery, in Arlington, Virginia.

== Awards and decorations ==
Bulkeley's awards and decorations include:

Surface Warfare Officer Insignia
Medal of Honor
Navy Cross	Distinguished Service Cross w/ one bronze oak leaf cluster	Navy Distinguished Service Medal w/ two 5/16" Gold Stars
Silver Star w/ one 5/16" Gold Star	Legion of Merit w/ Combat "V" and one 5/16" Gold Star	Purple Heart w/ one 5/16" Gold Star
Joint Service Commendation Medal	Combat Action Ribbon w/ two 5/16" Gold Stars	Navy Presidential Unit Citation
Army Presidential Unit Citation w/ one bronze oak leaf cluster	China Service Medal	American Defense Service Medal w/ Fleet Clasp (3/16" Bronze Star)
American Campaign Medal	Asiatic–Pacific Campaign Medal w/ three 3/16" Bronze Stars	European–African–Middle Eastern Campaign Medal w/ two 3/16" Bronze Stars
World War II Victory Medal	National Defense Service Medal w/ one 3/16" Bronze Star	Korean Service Medal
Navy and Marine Corps Overseas Service Ribbon	Distinguished Conduct Star with Silver Star (Philippines)	Croix de Guerre with Palm (France)
Republic of Korea Presidential Unit Citation	Philippine Defense Medal	United Nations Korea Medal
Republic of Korea War Service Medal	Navy Expert Rifleman Medal	Navy Expert Pistol Shot Medal

=== Medal of Honor citation ===
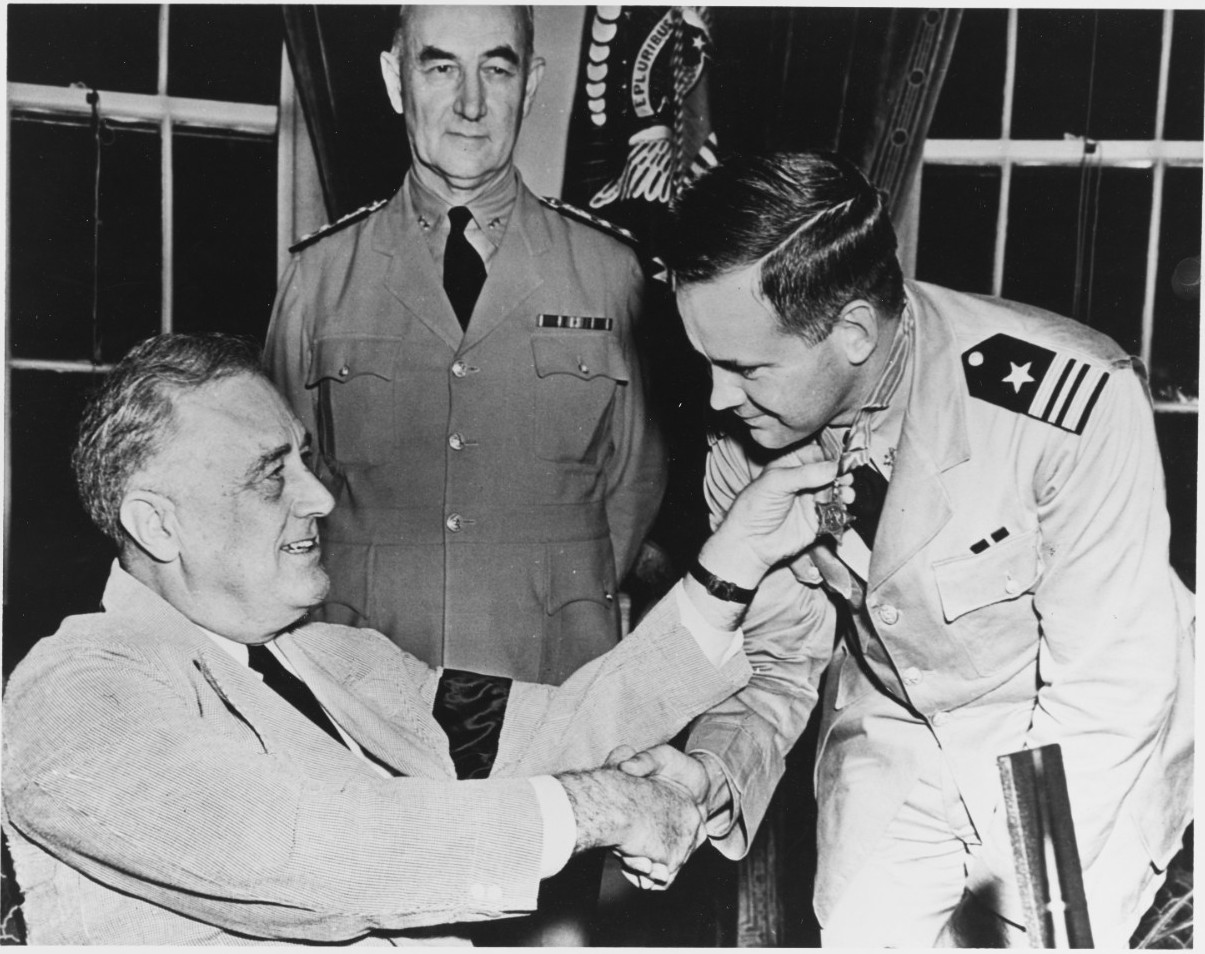
Lieutenant Commander Bulkeley being awarded the Medal of Honor by President Franklin D. Roosevelt

Bulkeley's Medal of Honor citation reads:

For extraordinary heroism, distinguished service, and conspicuous gallantry above and beyond the call of duty as commander of Motor Torpedo Boat Squadron 3, in Philippine waters during the period 7 December 1941 to 10 April 1942. The remarkable achievement of LCDR Bulkeley's command in damaging or destroying a notable number of Japanese enemy planes, surface combatant and merchant ships, and in dispersing landing parties and land-based enemy forces during the 4 months and 8 days of operation without benefit of repairs, overhaul, or maintenance facilities for his squadron, is believed to be without precedent in this type of warfare. His dynamic forcefulness and daring in offensive action, his brilliantly planned and skillfully executed attacks, supplemented by a unique resourcefulness and ingenuity, characterize him as an outstanding leader of men and a gallant and intrepid seaman. These qualities coupled with a complete disregard for his own personal safety reflect great credit upon him and the Naval Service.

== Legacy ==
The US Navy destroyer USS Bulkeley (DDG-84), commissioned in 2001, is named after him.

Route 57 in Mansfield Township, Warren County, New Jersey, is named the "Admiral John D. Bulkeley Memorial Highway" in his honor.

The headquarters building of Naval Station Guantanamo Bay is named Bulkeley Hall. A quartering area for sailors at the naval station is named Camp Bulkeley.

== In the media ==
Bulkeley's version of PT boat heroics in defending the Philippines from Japanese invasion in 1941–1942 was the subject of the laudatory fictionalized novel "They Were Expendable" by William Lindsay White in 1942. Three years later John Ford directed a film version of the book, They Were Expendable, starring John Wayne and Robert Montgomery, who portrayed motor torpedo boat squadron commander LT Brickley, based on Bulkeley's early experiences commanding Motor Torpedo Boat Squadron Three (MTBRON3) in the Philippines. Montgomery, a veteran PT-boat commander, assisted Ford in the direction. Donna Reed and Ward Bond were also featured.

Bulkeley was depicted in the 1977 movie MacArthur by William Wellman Jr. during the evacuation of General MacArthur and his family from Corregidor.

== See also ==
- List of Medal of Honor recipients
- List of Medal of Honor recipients for World War II
