= HMS Aphis =

Insect-class gunboat of the Royal Navy

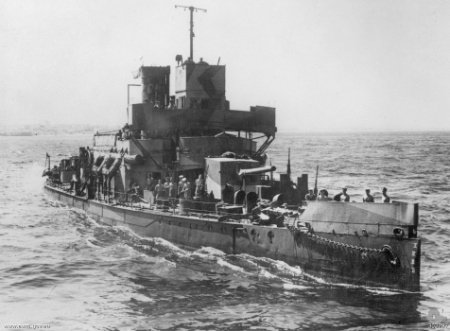
- HMS Aphis

History

United Kingdom
- Name: HMS Aphis
- Namesake: Aphis
- Builder: Ailsa Shipbuilding Company
- Launched: 15 September 1915
- Motto: Hostibus hostis; ("A Foe to our Foes")
- Honours and awards: Mediterranean (1940-45); Libya (1940-42); Sicily (1943); Adriatic (1944); Southern France (1944)
- Fate: Scrapped 1947
- Badge: On a Field Gold, an Aphis green

General characteristics
- Class & type: Insect-class gunboat
- Displacement: 625 long tons (635 t)
- Length: 237 ft 6 in (72.39 m)
- Beam: 36 ft (11 m)
- Draught: 4 ft (1.2 m)
- Propulsion: 2 × vertical triple expansion engines, 2,000 ihp (1,500 kW), 2 shafts
- Speed: 14 knots (26 km/h; 16 mph)
- Complement: 55
- Armament: 2 × BL 6-inch Mk VII guns; 2 × 12-pounder guns; 6 × .303-inch Maxim machine guns

HMS Aphis was a Royal Navy Insect-class gunboat. She was built by Ailsa Shipbuilding Company, launched on 15 September 1915 and completed in November 1915. She was based in Port Said at the beginning of World War I, served in Romania and then the China Station until 1940. All of her fighting service was in the Mediterranean, taking part in the invasion of Pantelleria and landings in the south of France, returning briefly to the Pacific in 1945. She was scrapped at Singapore in 1947. Her class was intended for shallow, fast flowing rivers and they also proved suitable for inshore operations when her relatively heavy weaponry could be used to support Army operations.

In February 1942 after a successful Warship Week National Savings campaign, Aphis was adopted by the civil communities of Warminster and Westbury in Wiltshire.

== Service ==
During 1917 Aphis was operated on the Danube, in support of military operations, based at Bucharest. She remained there until 1919.

In 1927 she transferred to the China Squadron for service in the Yangtze Flotilla to support British shipping and nationals in China. The situation in China remained volatile and Aphis remained with the Yangtze Flotilla until June 1940 when she was transferred to the Mediterranean Fleet at Alexandria.

For the next three years, Aphis provided artillery support for the Army. For example, in early December 1940, she bombarded Italian positions at Tobruk in company with her sister ships Ladybird and Gnat and the monitor Terror, and later that month, she bombarded harbour installations at Tobruk (three merchant ships were sunk). This continued into February 1941, when she was joined by three Australian destroyers (Stuart, Vampire and Voyager). Army support operations continued into April when Aphis bombarded enemy positions at Bomba and Gazala during the Eighth Army's withdrawal.

Aphis remained based at Alexandria until Malta became available for use as a naval base in March 1943. Based at Malta, nearer to the landings on the Italian islands and mainland Europe, she provided artillery support for Operation Corkscrew the attack on Pantelleria in June (with the headquarters ship Largs and the destroyers Petard and Paladin. Her planned deployment in support of the Operation Husky, the invasion of Sicily, was cancelled in view of the class' vulnerability to air attack. Instead, after a period at Malta, Aphis supported British landings in Calabria in early September. She was deployed with her sister Scarab and monitors Erebus, Roberts and Abercrombie, to bombard Axis positions on the coast between Reggio Calabria and Pessaro before the Operation Baytown landings by the British XIII Corps.

After another period at Malta, she participated in the support of the Operation Dragoon the landings in the south of France, this time under the command of Lt Commander Douglas Fairbanks Jr. USN. She joined the Western Task Force in June 1944, attached to the Special Operations Group at Ajaccio. The group was to mis-direct German resources by simulating large Allied landings and in mid-August they carried out bombardments between Antibes and the Var river. The operation was a complete success. A second diversionary operation took place off La Ciotat; Aphis and Scarab and the US destroyer Endicott bombarded the area. During the action, the Allied ships fought the Battle of La Ciotat when they were engaged by two German corvette UJ6082 and armed yacht UJ6083; both German ships were sunk.

In mid-August 1944, Aphis resumed duty with the Mediterranean Fleet and in September she was deployed in the Adriatic to support of Army operations, based at Ancona. She returned to Malta in January 1945. In July 1945, she left the Mediterranean to join the British Pacific Fleet at their forward base at Manus Island in the Admiralty Islands. By the time she arrived, Japan had surrendered and she did not join the fleet until after VJ Day. She was paid-off on arrival at Singapore and placed on the disposal list in 1946. She was sold for scrapping in May.

== Sources ==
- Lenton H.T, & Colledge, J.J., Warships of World War II, Ian Allan Publishing
