= They Were Expendable =

1945 film directed by John Ford

- Theatrical release insert poster
- Directed by: John Ford
- Screenplay by: Frank Wead; Jan Lustig (uncredited)
- Based on: They Were Expendable; 1942 book by William Lindsay White
- Produced by: John Ford
- Starring: Robert Montgomery; John Wayne; Donna Reed; Jack Holt; Ward Bond
- Cinematography: Joseph H. August
- Edited by: Douglass Biggs; Frank E. Hull
- Music by: Herbert Stothart
- Production company: Metro-Goldwyn-Mayer
- Distributed by: Loew's Inc.
- Release date: December 19, 1945
- Running time: 135 minutes
- Country: United States
- Language: English
- Budget: $2,933,000
- Box office: $4,347,000 (worldwide rentals)

They Were Expendable is a 1945 American war film directed by John Ford, starring Robert Montgomery and John Wayne, and featuring Donna Reed. The film is based on the 1942 novel of the same name by William Lindsay White, relating the story of the exploits of Motor Torpedo Boat Squadron Three, a United States PT boat unit defending the Philippines against Japanese invasion during the Battle of the Philippines (1941–42) in World War II.

While a work of fiction, the book was based on actual events and people. The characters John Brickley (Montgomery) and Rusty Ryan (Wayne) are fictionalizations of PT-Boat Squadron Three Commander John D. Bulkeley, a Medal of Honor recipient, and his executive officer Robert Kelly, respectively. Both the film and the book, which was a best-seller and excerpted in Reader's Digest and LIFE, depict certain combat-related events that were believed to have occurred during the war, alongside those which did not; (Note: Including claims known by Cmdr. Buckeley to have been false when he made them, as well as those subsequently disproven or shown to have been highly exaggerated, again most notably by Buckeley, in promoting the PT-boat as an effective naval weapon to both the Navy and potential PT flotilla recruits.) nonetheless, the film is noted for its relatively accurate and detailed depiction of naval combat for the era in which it was made.

== Plot ==
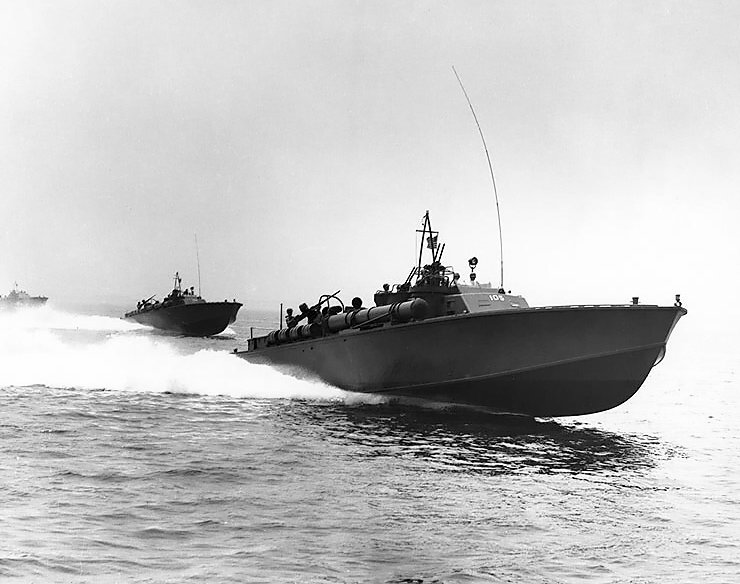
PT boats at speed

In December 1941, Lieutenant John "Brick" Brickley commands a squadron of unproven U.S. Navy PT boats based at Cavite in the Philippines. He puts on a demonstration of their maneuverability and seakeeping capabilities for the senior area commander, Admiral Blackwell, who remains unimpressed by their diminutive size and lightweight construction. Lieutenant (j.g.) "Rusty" Ryan, Brick's immature executive officer (XO), is eager to see combat. Disgusted by the admiral's close-minded dismissal, he's drafting a transfer request when news of the Japanese attack on Pearl Harbor arrives by radio.

Japanese forces also attack the Philippines but Brick's squadron is kept out of combat, consigned to menial mail and messenger duty. After their base is bombed the squadron receives orders to attack a Japanese cruiser shelling U.S. troop emplacements ashore. Rusty is chosen to command the second boat on the sortie, but Brick discovers that his XO has blood poisoning from a previous combat wound and orders him to sick bay, selecting another boat and crew to take his place. An unhappy Rusty accuses his commanding officer of glory hogging and resists evacuation to a hospital on Corregidor, but reluctantly admits the severity of his life-threatening condition. After another patient, "Ohio" (Louis Jean Heydt), persuades him to tone down his anger, Rusty begins a romance with strong-willed Army nurse Sandy Davyss.

Brick's attack sinks the cruiser and Rusty returns to duty. The squadron deploys on numerous sorties with increasing success, at high cost in both boats and men. Sandy attends a dinner in her honor at the PT base. The squadron is marooned on Corregidor after the Japanese attack on Bataan. The boats are ordered to evacuate the commanding general of the Pacific Theatre, Douglas MacArthur, his entourage, and Admiral Blackwell to the southern-most Philippine island of Mindanao, where they will be flown south to Australia. Rusty makes a last phone call to Sandy, now on Bataan, to explain he has been ordered away. Before they can say goodbye, the connection is cut off.

The small three-boat PT flotilla successfully carries the commanders to their rendezvous then resumes its attacks against the Japanese, who gradually whittle the squadron down until it is too small to function effectively. Crews without boats are lent to the Army to fight as infantry. After Rusty's boat is damaged, the last two PTs pull into a small shipyard run by crusty "Dad" Knowland for repairs. The boats escape just ahead of the Japanese, but Dad refuses to flee, bidding farewell with a rifle in his arms and a whiskey jug tucked securely at his feet.

During an attack that sinks another Japanese cruiser Rusty's boat is sunk. Brick's boat is turned over to the US Army, once again reduced to messenger duty. Brick, Ryan, and two ensigns are ordered out on the last available plane to return stateside to train PT crews. The small, inexpensive, wood-hulled boats have proved their worth in combat. Rusty encounters Ohio while waiting to depart. Neither knows what happened to Sandy, trapped behind on Bataan, and hope she escaped into the hills. When the ensigns arrive late, Rusty bolts for the aircraft's exit, but is brought to heel by Brickley, who reminds him his duty comes first. Ohio is forced to give up his seat on the plane and is left behind to face certain death or capture.

The surviving enlisted men, led by Chief Mulcahey, shoulder rifles and march off to continue the resistance with the remnants of the U.S. Army and Filipino guerrillas, as expendable in the fight as their PT boats had been before them.

== Cast ==
- Robert Montgomery as Lieutenant John Brickley (as Robert Montgomery Commander U.S.N.R.)
- John Wayne as Lieutenant (junior grade) "Rusty" Ryan
- Donna Reed as Second Lieutenant Sandy Davyss
- Jack Holt as Brigadier General Martin
- Ward Bond as BMC "Boats" Mulcahey
- Marshall Thompson as Ensign "Snake" Gardner
- Paul Langton as Ensign "Andy" Andrews
- Leon Ames as Major James Morton
- Arthur Walsh as Seaman Jones
- Donald Curtis as Lieutenant (J.G.) "Shorty" Long/Radio Announcer
- Cameron Mitchell as Ensign George Cross
- Jeff York as Ensign Tony Aiken
- Murray Alper as TM1c "Slug" Mahan
- Harry Tenbrook as SC2c "Squarehead" Larsen
- Jack Pennick as "Doc"
- Alex Havier as ST3c "Benny" Lecoco
- Charles Trowbridge as Rear Admiral Blackwell
- Robert Barrat as General of the Army Douglas MacArthur
- Bruce Kellogg as Elder Tompkins MoMM2c
- Tim Murdock as Ensign Brant
- Louis Jean Heydt as "Ohio"
- Russell Simpson as "Dad" Knowland
- Vernon Steele as Army Doctor

== Production ==
Following the acquisition of the film rights to White's novel They Were Expendable, MGM asked Ford to direct a film based on the book; Ford repeatedly refused due to his conflicting service in the Navy Field Photographic Unit. While he was serving in the photographic unit, Ford met Lieutenant John D. Bulkeley during the preparation of the Normandy Invasion, and later signed Bulkeley's D-Day executive officer Robert Montgomery

According to Turner Classic Movies host Ben Mankiewicz, Ford, a notoriously tough taskmaster who had received a commission as a commander in the U.S. Navy Reserve in his late 40s during WWII, was especially hard on Wayne, who had a 3-A — family deferment — draft rating. During production, Ford fell from scaffolding and broke his leg. He turned to Montgomery, who had actually commanded a PT boat, to temporarily take over for him as director. Montgomery did so well that within a few years, he made the transition from actor to directing films.

The film, which received extensive support from the Navy Department, was shot in Key Biscayne, Florida, and the Florida Keys. This region of sandy islands and palm trees around 25° North latitude sufficiently approximated the Philippines between roughly 10 and 15° North, where the film's action took place in the Southwest Pacific of the Pacific theatre of World War II. Two U.S. Navy 80-foot Elco PT boats (hull numbers PT-139 and 141), and four 78-foot Higgins PT boats, (hull numbers PT-98, 100, 101, 102), were used throughout filming, given hull numbers in use in late 1941 and early 1942 for the film. Additional U.S. aircraft from nearby naval air stations in Miami, Fort Lauderdale, and Key West were temporarily re-marked and used to simulate Japanese aircraft in the film.

Ford's onscreen directing credit reads, "Directed by John Ford, Captain U.S.N.R."; Frank Wead's onscreen credit reads: "Screenplay by Frank Wead, Comdr. U.S.N., Ret."; Montgomery's onscreen credit reads: "Robert Montgomery, Comdr. U.S.N.R."

=== Depiction of PT boats' effectiveness ===
The movie likely exaggerated the actual effectiveness of the PT boats in the war, and in at least one instance loosely referenced Commander Bulkeley's own exaggerated statements. Lt. Brickley, the character most closely based on the real Commander John Bulkeley, declares at one point in the movie that PT boats had "sunk two converted cruisers, an auxiliary aircraft carrier, a 10,000-ton tanker, a large freighter, a flock of barges, and numerous sons of Nippon!" This statement is very similar to a claim made by the real Commander Bulkeley himself during the war that "Our little half squadron sank one Jap cruiser, one plane tender, and one loaded transport, badly damaged another cruiser, set a tanker on fire, and shot down four planes". According to William Doyle, the author of PT 109: An American Epic of War, Survival, and the Destiny of John F. Kennedy, "after the war, when Japanese naval loss records were examined by U. S. Naval Intelligence experts, it was learned that these claims were inaccurate and exaggerated". Contemporary historians of President John F. Kennedy, William Doyle, and Fredrik Logevall noted that some of the primary problems of the PT boats were the accuracy and relatively slow speed of their Mark 8 torpedoes. Added to the problem of inaccuracy at reaching target, as many as 50% failed to explode on contact with enemy ships due to faulty calibration by the Navy in the early years of the war.

=== Reception ===
In The Nation in 1946, critic James Agee wrote, " ... the picture is showing nothing much newer, with no particular depth of feeling, much less idea; but, again, the whole thing is so beautifully directed and photographed, in such an abundance of vigorous open air and good raw sunlight, that I thoroughly enjoyed and admired it ... Another man who evidently learned a tremendous amount through the war is Robert Montgomery, whose sober, light, sure performance is, so far as I can remember, the one perfection to turn up in movies during the year."

In his 2005 Movie and Video Guide, film critic and historian Leonard Maltin awarded They Were Expendable four stars, describing it as a "moving, exquisitely detailed production" that is "one of the finest (and most underrated) of all WW2 films."

The movie was popular, earning $3,109,000 domestically and $1,238,000 foreign, but because of its high cost, recorded a loss of $101,000.

== Awards and honors ==
Douglas Shearer was nominated for the Oscar for Best Sound Recording, while A. Arnold Gillespie, Donald Jahraus, R. A. MacDonald, and Michael Steinore were nominated for Best Effects. It was also named in the "10 Best Films of 1945" list by The New York Times.

== See also ==
- Battle of Corregidor
- Bataan Death March – the fate of many captured by the Japanese on Bataan
- Patrol torpedo boat PT-109
- Philippines campaign (1944–1945)
- Japanese invasion of Lingayen Gulf – background
