= USS Endicott =

American Gleaves-class destroyer

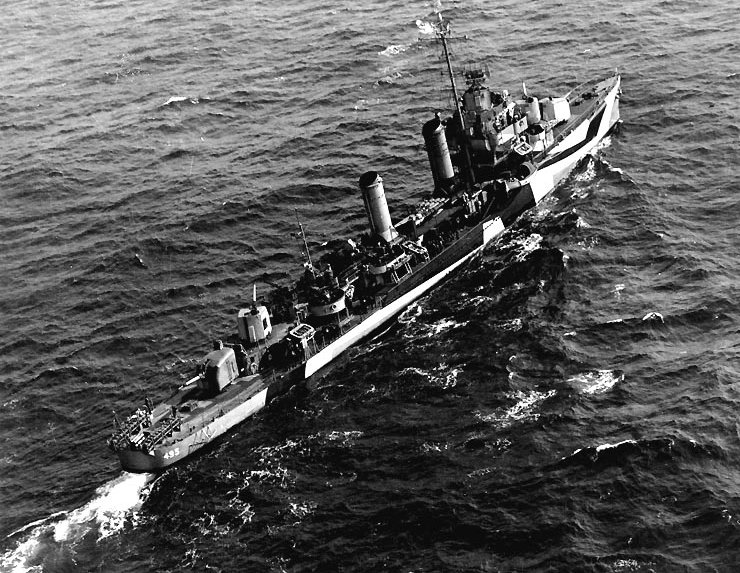
- USS Endicott (DD-495)

History

United States
- Name: Endicott
- Namesake: Samuel Endicott
- Builder: Seattle-Tacoma Shipbuilding Corporation
- Laid down: 1 May 1941
- Launched: 5 April 1942
- Commissioned: 25 February 1943
- Identification: DD-495
- Reclassified: DMS-35, 30 May 1945
- Decommissioned: 17 August 1955
- Stricken: 1 November 1969
- Fate: Sold 6 October 1970 and; broken up for scrap

General characteristics
- Class & type: Gleaves-class destroyer
- Displacement: 1,630 tons
- Length: 348 ft 3 in (106.15 m)
- Beam: 36 ft 1 in (11.00 m)
- Draft: 11 ft 10 in (3.61 m)
- Propulsion: 50,000 shp (37,000 kW); 4 boilers; 2 propellers
- Speed: 37.4 knots (69 km/h)
- Range: 6,500 nmi (12,000 km; 7,500 mi) at 12 kn (22 km/h; 14 mph)
- Complement: 16 officers, 260 enlisted
- Armament: 4 × 5 in (127 mm) DP guns, 2 x Bofors 40 mm gun mounts, 7 × 20 mm AA guns, 5 × 21 in (533 mm) torpedo tubes, 2 × depth charge tracks, 6 x K-Gun racks

USS Endicott (DD-495), was a Gleaves-class destroyer of the United States Navy.

== Namesake ==
Samuel Endicott served as a quarter gunner on board Enterprise in the Barbary Wars. He volunteered to participate in the expedition under Lieutenant Stephen Decatur, Jr., which destroyed the former U.S. frigate Philadelphia.

== Construction and commissioning ==
Endicott was launched by the Seattle-Tacoma Shipbuilding Corp., Seattle, Washington, on 5 April 1942; sponsored by Miss Bettie L. Rankin. The ship was commissioned on 25 February 1943. She was reclassified DMS-35 on 30 May 1945.

== History ==
=== Initial operations ===
The destroyer underwent shakedown off San Diego, was ordered to the U.S. Atlantic Fleet and in her first year escorted two convoys to Africa and one to Ireland, Panama, and Trinidad.

In preparation for the European invasion Endicott served as escort for merchantmen and transports until 24 May 1944 when she collided with the freighter SS Exhibitor and was forced to undergo repairs at Cardiff, South Wales.

=== European theater ===
Endicott rejoined the fleet on 12 July and escorted LSTs and LCIs into the Mediterranean for the buildup preparatory to the attack on southern France (Operation Dragoon). The destroyer, together with British gunboats Scarab, Aphis, and 17 motor torpedo boats, was scheduled to make a diversionary attack against the coast at La Ciotat. The feint successfully deceived the enemy and Endicott sank a German merchantman during the bombardment. She then hastened to rescue the British gunboats in their uneven match against two German warships, Nimet Allah and Capriola, and though battle weary she destroyed both. In the action she was hit by one shell; although a dud, it still tore a large hole in the ship and wounded a man. She continued to support coastal operations off southern France by escorting a convoy to Corsica, and HMS Eastway to Salerno.

Endicott underwent overhaul and refresher training from October through the end of 1944. In January 1945 she sailed via Bermuda on the scouting line, then proceeded to rendezvous with Task Group 21.5 (TG 21.5) to escort the cruiser Quincy — on which President Franklin D. Roosevelt was embarked — to Malta and back to New York.

=== Pacific theater ===
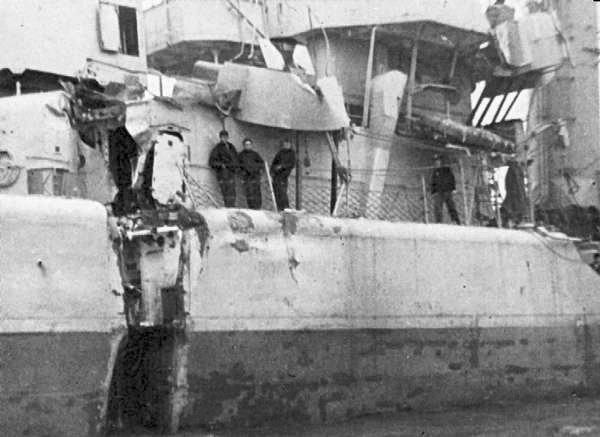
Sailors examine the damage to the Endicott following the Battle of La Ciotat.

She escorted a convoy to Oran in mid-April and then entered the Charleston Navy Yard for conversion to a high-speed minesweeper. Dispatched to the Pacific, she arrived in San Diego three days after the Japanese surrender.

Endicott reported to Task Force 52 at Okinawa on 23 September 1945 to begin the huge task of ridding the Yellow Sea of mines. Designated flagship of the sweeping group, she conducted similar operations in the Inland Sea and Kure area as well.

After a period of overhaul in May 1946, she operated out of San Diego in peacetime patrols and local exercises until the outbreak of the Korean War.

=== Korean War ===
In June 1950 she weighed anchor for the coast of Korea where she screened aircraft carriers Badoeng Strait and Sicily. Steaming to Chinhae Wan in August, she lent direct fire support to the United Nations troops and on 15 September escorted a Korean LST in a feint attack against Chang Sa Dong. When the LST broached, Endicott stood guard until help arrived.

She continued her harassment of the enemy following the Inchon landings, cruising along the east coast of Korea and supporting the minesweeping force. For the remainder of the year she afforded sweeping assistance at Wonsan and then at Hungnam prior to the evacuation of troops forced by the penetration of the Chinese Communists. She participated in the action of 12 October 1950, an engagement in which two American minesweepers were sunk.

In January 1951 she rescued the crew of the grounded Siamese frigate Prase and stood guard until the latter had to be destroyed. Early in February she led a mine-sweeping force in bombarding the port of Wonsan and sweeping to the northward.

An overhaul in San Diego was succeeded by Endicott's second tour in Korean waters. She reported to Commander Naval Forces in October and returned to shore bombardment and patrol. During the first half of 1952 she cruised on the Songjin Patrol and devoted the last four months of the year to overhaul at Long Beach Naval Shipyard. Early in 1953 she again sailed for the Far East to patrol and provide gun support for minesweepers operating in the Korean area. Endicott received repairs at Long Beach in August and thereafter conducted individual and fleet exercises in local waters. On 17 August 1954 she was decommissioned and placed in reserve at San Diego. Endicott was reclassified DD-495 on 15 July 1955.
