= 1935 in literature =

This article contains information about the literary events and publications of 1935.

== Events ==
- January – The first published portions of Yasunari Kawabata's novel Snow Country (雪国, Yukiguni) appear as standalone stories in Japan.
- January 6 – Clifford Odets becomes the first Method-trained playwright with his first produced play, the one-act Waiting for Lefty at the former Civic Repertory Theatre in New York City. This is followed by the equally political Awake and Sing! premiered on February 19 at the city's Belasco Theatre; Till the Day I Die on March 26 at the Longacre Theatre; and Paradise Lost opening on December 9 at the same location.
- March 20 – The London publisher Boriswood pleads guilty and is fined in Manchester's Assize Court for publishing an "obscene" book, a 1934 cheap edition of James Hanley's 1931 novel Boy.
- May 13 – T. E. Lawrence, having left the British Royal Air Force in March, has an accident with his Brough Superior motorcycle while returning to his cottage at Clouds Hill, England, after posting books to a friend, A. E. "Jock" Chambers, and sending a telegram inviting the novelist Henry Williamson to lunch. He dies six days later. On July 29 his Seven Pillars of Wisdom is first published in an edition for general circulation.
- June 15
  - British poet W. H. Auden contracts a marriage of convenience with exiled German anti-Nazi actress and writer Erika Mann, homosexual like him.
  - T. S. Eliot's verse drama Murder in the Cathedral is premièred at Canterbury Cathedral, the setting for the action of the play.
- July 30 – Allen Lane founds Penguin Books, as the first mass-market paperbacks in Britain.
- August – Open-air reading room established by New York Public Library in Bryant Park.
- August 27 – The Federal Theatre Project is established in the United States.
- September 5 – Michael Joseph is founded as a publisher in London.
- November 2 – The Scottish-born thriller writer John Buchan, 1st Baron Tweedsmuir, is sworn in as Governor General of Canada.
- November 7 – The British and Foreign Blind Association introduces a library of talking books for the visually impaired.
- November 26 – Scrooge, the first feature-length talking film version of Dickens' A Christmas Carol (1843) is released in Britain. Sir Seymour Hicks reprises the title rôle, which he has performed for decades on stage.
- unknown dates
  - The library journal Die Bucherei in Nazi Germany publishes guidelines for books to be removed from library shelves and destroyed: all those by Jewish authors, Marxist and pacifist literature, and anything critical of the state.
  - The first published edition of the Marquis de Sade's The 120 Days of Sodom (Les 120 journées de Sodome), written in 1785, in a scholarly edition as a literary text, is completed.
  - Fredric Warburg and Roger Senhouse retrieve the London publishers Martin Secker from receivership, as Secker & Warburg.

== New books ==
=== Fiction ===
- Nelson Algren – Somebody in Boots
- Mulk Raj Anand – Untouchable
- Enid Bagnold – National Velvet
- Ion Biberi – Proces (Trial)
- Jorge Luis Borges – A Universal History of Infamy (Historia universal de la infamia, collected short stories)
- Elizabeth Bowen – The House in Paris
- Pearl S. Buck – A House Divided
- John Bude – The Lake District Murder
- Edgar Rice Burroughs – Tarzan and the Leopard Men
- Dino Buzzati – Il segreto del Bosco Vecchio
- Erskine Caldwell – Journeyman
- Morley Callaghan – They Shall Inherit the Earth
- Elias Canetti – Die Blendung
- John Dickson Carr
  - Death-Watch
  - The Hollow Man (also The Three Coffins)
  - The Red Widow Murders (as Carter Dickson)
  - The Unicorn Murders (as Carter Dickson)
- Agatha Christie
  - Three Act Tragedy
  - Death in the Clouds
- Solomon Cleaver – Jean Val Jean
- Robert P. Tristram Coffin – Red Sky in the Morning
- J.J. Connington – In Whose Dim Shadow
- Jack Conroy – A World to Win
- Freeman Wills Crofts – Crime at Guildford
- A. J. Cronin
  - Country Doctor (novella)
  - The Stars Look Down
- H. L. Davis – Honey in the Horn
- Cecil Day-Lewis – A Question of Proof
- Franklin W. Dixon – The Hidden Harbor Mystery
- Lawrence Durrell – Pied Piper of Lovers
- E. R. Eddison – Mistress of Mistresses
- Susan Ertz
  - Now We Set Out
  - Woman Alive, But Now Dead
- James T. Farrell – Studs Lonigan – A Trilogy
- Rachel Field – Time Out of Mind
- Charles G. Finney – The Circus of Dr. Lao
- F. Scott Fitzgerald – Taps at Reveille
- Anthony Gilbert – The Man Who Was Too Clever
- Graham Greene – England Made Me
- George Wylie Henderson – Ollie Miss
- Harold Heslop – Last Cage Down
- Georgette Heyer
  - Death in the Stocks
  - Regency Buck
- George L. Howe – Slaves Cottage
- Christopher Isherwood – Mr Norris Changes Trains
- Pamela Hansford Johnson – This Bed Thy Centre
- Anna Kavan (writing as Helen Ferguson) – A Stranger Still
- Sinclair Lewis – It Can't Happen Here
- E. C. R. Lorac
  - Death of an Author
  - The Organ Speaks
- August Mälk – Õitsev Meri (The Flowering Sea)
- André Malraux – Le Temps du mépris
- Ngaio Marsh
  - Enter a Murderer
  - The Nursing Home Murder
- Horace McCoy - They Shoot Horses, Don't They?
- Gladys Mitchell – The Devil at Saxon Wall
- Naomi Mitchison – We Have Been Warned
- Alberto Moravia – Le ambizioni sbagliate
- R. K. Narayan – Swami and Friends
- John O'Hara
  - BUtterfield 8
  - The Doctor's Son and Other Stories
- George Orwell – A Clergyman's Daughter
- N. Porsenna – Se-aprind făcliile (They're Lighting Torches)
- Ellery Queen
  - The Spanish Cape Mystery
  - The Lamp of God
- Charles Ferdinand Ramuz – When the Mountain Fell
- Marjorie Kinnan Rawlings – Golden Apples
- Ernest Raymond – We, The Accused
- Herbert Read – The Green Child
- George Santayana – The Last Puritan
- Dorothy L. Sayers – Gaudy Night
- Monica Shannon – Dobry
- Howard Spring – Rachel Rosing
- Eleanor Smith – Tzigane
- John Steinbeck – Tortilla Flat
- Rex Stout – The League of Frightened Men
- Cecil Street
  - The Corpse in the Car
  - Hendon's First Case
  - Mystery at Olympia
- Alan Sullivan – The Great Divide
- Phoebe Atwood Taylor
  - Deathblow Hill
  - The Tinkling Symbol
- A. A. Thomson – The Exquisite Burden
- B. Traven – The Treasure of the Sierra Madre
- Violet Trefusis – Broderie Anglaise
- S. S. Van Dine – The Garden Murder Case
- I. C. Vissarion – Învietorul de morți (Raiser of the Dead)
- Henry Wade – Heir Presumptive
- Stanley G. Weinbaum – The Lotus Eaters
- Dennis Wheatley – The Eunuch of Stamboul
- Ethel Lina White – Wax
- P. G. Wodehouse – Blandings Castle and Elsewhere
- Xiao Hong (蕭紅) – The Field of Life and Death (生死场, Shēng sǐ chǎng)
- Eiji Yoshikawa (吉川 英治) – Musashi (宮本武蔵, Miyamoto Musashi)
- Francis Brett Young – White Ladies
- Yumeno Kyūsaku (夢野 久作) – Dogra Magra (ドグラマグラ)

=== Children and young people ===
- Enid Bagnold – National Velvet
- Louise Andrews Kent – He went with Marco Polo: A Story of Venice and Cathay (first of seven in "He went with" series)
- John Masefield – The Box of Delights
- Constantin S. Nicolăescu-Plopșor – Ceaùr. Povești oltenești (Woozy. Oltenian Stories)
- Kate Seredy – The Good Master
- Laura Ingalls Wilder – Little House on the Prairie

=== Drama ===
- J. R. Ackerley – The Prisoners of War
- Maxwell Anderson – Winterset
- Albert Bein – Let Freedom Ring
- T. S. Eliot – Murder in the Cathedral
- Federico García Lorca – Doña Rosita the Spinster (Doña Rosita la soltera)
- Norman Ginsbury – Viceroy Sarah
- Jean Giraudoux – The Trojan War Will Not Take Place (La Guerre de Troie n'aura pas lieu)
- Walter Hackett – Espionage
- N. C. Hunter – All Rights Reserved
- Ronald Jeans – The Composite Man
- Anthony Kimmins – Chase the Ace
- Archibald MacLeish – Panic
- Bernard Merivale – The Unguarded Hour
- Clifford Odets
  - Waiting for Lefty
  - Awake and Sing!
- Lawrence Riley – Personal Appearance
- Dodie Smith – Call It a Day
- John Van Druten – Most of the Game
- Emlyn Williams – Night Must Fall

=== Poetry ===
- See 1935 in poetry

=== Non-fiction ===
- Julian Bell, ed. – We Did Not Fight: 1914–18 Experiences of War Resisters
- M. C. Bradbrook – Themes and Conventions of Elizabethan Tragedy
- William Henry Chamberlin – Russia's Iron Age
- Manuel Chaves Nogales – Juan Belmonte, matador de toros: su vida y sus hazañas (translated as Juan Belmonte, killer of bulls)
- George Dangerfield – The Strange Death of Liberal England
- Clarence Day – Life with Father
- Dion Fortune – The Mystical Qabalah
- Ernest Hemingway – Green Hills of Africa
- Jack Hilton – Caliban Shrieks
- Anne Morrow Lindbergh – North to the Orient
- Merkantilt biografisk leksikon
- Polish Biographical Dictionary (Polski słownik biograficzny)
- Iris Origo – Allegra (biography of Byron's daughter)
- Caroline Spurgeon – Shakespeare's Imagery, and what it tells us
- Nigel Tranter – The Fortalices and Early Mansions of Southern Scotland 1400–1650
- J. Dover Wilson – What Happens in Hamlet
- Thomas Wright – The Life of Charles Dickens

== Births ==
- January 2 – David McKee, English children's writer and illustrator (died 2022)
- January 8 – Lewis H. Lapham, American publisher, founder of Lapham's Quarterly (died 2024)
- January 14 – Labhshankar Thakar, Indian Gujarati language poet, playwright and story writer (died 2016)
- January 15 – Robert Silverberg, American Science fiction writer
- January 18 – Jon Stallworthy, English poet and literary critic (died 2014)
- January 27 – D. M. Thomas, English novelist, poet and translator (died 2023)
- January 28
  - David Lodge, English novelist and academic (died 2025)
  - Hermann Peter Piwitt, German writer (died 2026)
- January 30 – Richard Brautigan, American writer and poet (died 1984)
- January 31 – Kenzaburō Ōe (大江 健三郎), Japanese novelist and essayist (died 2023)
- February 18 – Janette Oke, Canadian author
- February 22 – Danilo Kiš, Serbian novelist (died 1989)
- February 23 – Tom Murphy, Irish playwright (died 2018)
- March 4 – Stanisław Moskal, Polish scientist and writer (died 2019)
- March 13
  - Kofi Awoonor, Ghanaian poet and writer (killed 2013)
  - David Nobbs, English comedy writer (died 2015)
- March 23 – Barry Cryer, English comedy writer and performer (died 2022)
- March 27 – Abelardo Castillo, Argentinian writer (died 2017)
- March 31 – Judith Rossner, American novelist (died 2005)
- April 4
  - Trevor Griffiths, English playwright and screenwriter (died 2024)
  - Michael Horovitz, German-born English poet and translator (died 2021)
- April 6 – John Pepper Clark, Nigerian poet and playwright (died 2020)
- April 14 – Erich von Däniken, Swiss writer on paranormal (died 2026)
- April 15 – Alan Plater, English playwright and screenwriter (died 2010)
- April 25 – Li Ao, Chinese-Taiwanese writer, social commentator, historian and independent politician (died 2018)
- April 26 – Patricia Reilly Giff, American author and educator
- May 1 – Julian Mitchell, English playwright and screenwriter
- May 2 – Lynda Lee-Potter, English columnist (died 2004)
- May 9 – Roger Hargreaves, English children's author and illustrator (died 1988)
- May 29 – André Brink, South African novelist (died 2015)
- June 2 – Carol Shields, American-born writer (died 2003)
- June 4 – Shiao Yi, Taiwanese-American wuxia novelist (d. 2018)
- June 7 – Harry Crews, American author and playwright (died 2012)
- June 24 – Pete Hamill, American journalist and author (died 2020)
- June 25
  - Corinne Chevallier, Algerian historian and novelist
  - Larry Kramer, American playwright, author, film producer and LGBT activist (died 2020).
  - Fran Ross, African-American satirist (died 1985)
- June 30 – Peter Achinstein, American philosopher
- July 11 – Günther von Lojewski, German journalist, television presenter and author (died 2023)
- July 13 – Earl Lovelace, Trinidadian novelist and playwright
- August 1 – Mohinder Pratap Chand, Urdu poet, writer and language advocate (died 2020)
- August 15 – Régine Deforges, French dramatist, novelist and publisher (died 2014)
- August 21 – Yuri Entin, Soviet and Russian poet, lyricist and playwright
- August 22 – E. Annie Proulx, American novelist
- September 5 – Ward Just, American novelist (died 2019)
- September 10 – Mary Oliver, American poet (died 2019)
- September 16 – Esther Vilar, German-Argentinian writer
- September 17 – Ken Kesey, American novelist (died 2001)
- October 7 – Thomas Keneally, Australian novelist and non-fiction writer
- November 1 – Edward Said, Palestinian-American literary critic (died 2003)
- November 7
  - Elvira Quintana, Spanish-Mexican actress, singer, and poet (died 1968)
  - Willibrordus S. Rendra, Indonesian dramatist, poet, activist, performer, actor and director (died 2009)
- November 9 – Jerry Hopkins, American journalist and biographer (died 2018)
- November 18
  - Sam Abrams, American poet
  - Rodney Hall, Australian author and poet
- November 22 – Hugh C. Rae (Jessica Stirling, etc.), Scottish novelist (died 2014)
- December 5 – Yevgeny Titarenko, Soviet writer (died 2018)
- December 10 – Shūji Terayama (寺山 修司), Japanese avant-garde writer, film director and photographer (died 1983)
- December 13
  - Eyvindur P. Eiríksson, Icelandic poet and novelist
  - Adélia Prado, Brazilian writer and poet
- unknown date – Bahaa Taher, Egyptian writer

== Deaths ==
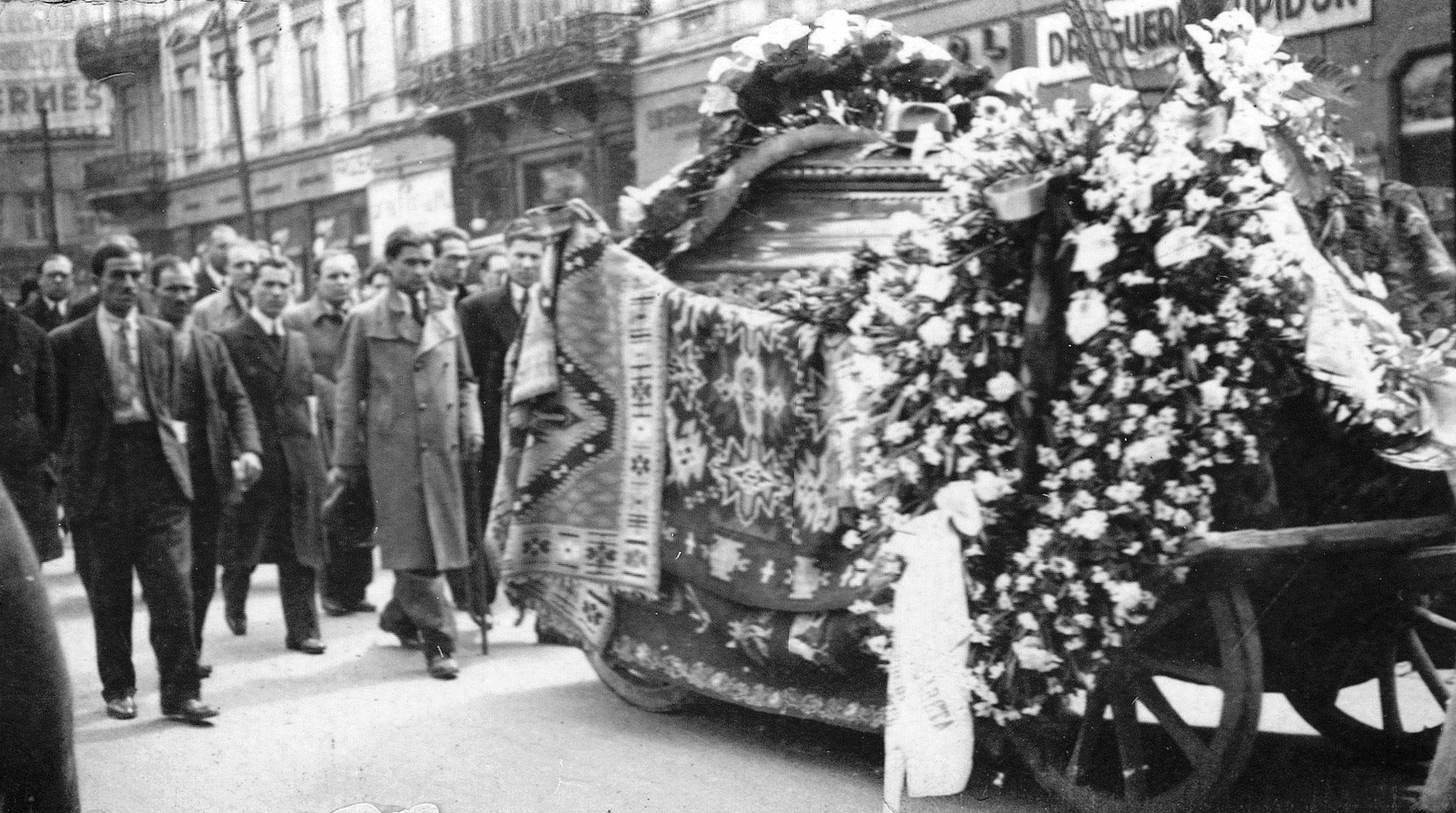
Funeral cortege for Panait Istrati. Bucharest, April 1935

- February 7 – Lewis Grassic Gibbon, Scottish novelist (peritonitis, born 1901)
- February 13
  - Ioan Bianu, Romanian librarian, bibliographer and linguist (uremia, born 1856 or 1857)
  - Vernon Lee, born Violet Paget, expatriate English writer (born 1856)
- February 28 – Tsubouchi Shōyō (坪内 逍遥), Japanese writer (born 1859)
- April 6 – Edwin Arlington Robinson, American poet (born 1869)
- April 11 – Anna Katharine Green, American crime writer (born 1846)
- April 16 – Panait Istrati, Romanian novelist, short story writer and political essayist (tuberculosis, born 1884)
- May 19 – T. E. Lawrence (Lawrence of Arabia), English historian and memoirist (motorcycle accident, born 1888)
- June 29 – Hayashi Fubo, Japanese novelist (born 1900)
- July 17 – George William Russell, Irish nationalist, poet and artist (born 1867)
- August 11 – Sir William Watson, English poet (born 1858)
- August 17 – Charlotte Perkins Gilman, American novelist (born 1860)
- August 30 – Henri Barbusse, French novelist and journalist (pneumonia, born 1873)
- September 26 – Iván Persa, Hungarian Slovene writer and priest (born 1861)
- September 29 – Winifred Holtby, English novelist (Bright's disease, born 1898)
- October 11 – Steele Rudd, Australian short story writer (born 1868)
- November 4 – Ella Loraine Dorsey, American author, journalist and translator (born 1853)
- November 28

- Mary R. Platt Hatch, American author (born 1848)
- Louise Manning Hodgkins, American educator, author, editor (born 1846)

- November 29 – Mary G. Charlton Edholm, American journalist and temperance reformer (born 1854)
- November 30 – Fernando Pessoa, Portuguese poet, philosopher and critic (cirrhosis, born 1888)
- December 14 – Stanley G. Weinbaum, American science-fiction author (born 1902)
- December 17 – Lizette Woodworth Reese, American poet (born 1856)
- December 21 – Kurt Tucholsky, German journalist and satirist (drug overdose, born 1890)
- December 28 – Clarence Day, American writer (born 1874)

== Awards ==
- James Tait Black Memorial Prize for fiction: L. H. Myers, The Root and the Flower
- James Tait Black Memorial Prize for biography: R. W. Chambers, Thomas More
- Newbery Medal for children's literature: Monica Shannon, Dobry
- Nobel Prize in Literature: not awarded
- Pulitzer Prize for Drama: Zoë Akins, The Old Maid
- Pulitzer Prize for Poetry: Audrey Wurdemann, Bright Ambush
- Pulitzer Prize for the Novel: Josephine Winslow Johnson, Now in November
