= List of United States Navy people =

This article contains a list of notable people (officers and sailors) of the United States Navy.

== Officers ==
- Andrew Baldwin – doctor and the bachelor for Season 10 of The Bachelor
- Commodore John Barry – "Father of the American Navy"
- W.W. Behrens, Jr. – earth-sciences futurist
- Hale Boggs – member of the U.S. House of Representatives from New Orleans and House majority leader
- Jeremy Michael Boorda – admiral, former Chief of Naval Operations
- Henry L. Brandon – naval aviator and oil executive
- Bill Branon – captain and naval medical officer, novelist
- Bruce Bromley – associate judge of the New York Court of Appeals, prominent trial lawyer at Cravath, Swaine & Moore
- Don Brown – former U.S. Navy JAG officer, author of the Navy Justice Series
- John D. Bulkeley – Vice admiral and one of the most decorated officers of the U.S. Navy. Recipient of the Medal of Honor for his actions in the Pacific Theater during World War II. He was also the PT boat skipper who evacuated General Douglas MacArthur from Corregidor in the Philippines and commanded at the Battle of La Ciotat. Bulkeley's PT-boat heroics in defending the Philippines from Japanese invasion in 1941-1942 was the subject of the novel They Were Expendable by William Lindsay White in 1942, which was turned into the big screen epic They Were Expendable three years later by director John Ford, starring John Wayne, with Robert Montgomery playing a somewhat fictionalized Bulkeley role.
- Arleigh Burke – destroyer captain
- George H.W. Bush – naval aviator, former U.S. President; former director of the Central Intelligence Agency
- Richard Evelyn Byrd – polar explorer
- James F. Cahill – one of the first scuba divers and first Navy SEALs
- Joe Cardona - 2 time Super Bowl champion with the New England Patriots and current long snapper for the Los Angeles Rams
- Jimmy Carter – USNA class ‘47, former U.S. President; Cold War submariner and Peace Prize laureate
- Vern Clark – former Chief of Naval Operations
- Laura M. Cobb – navy nurse, lieutenant commander in World War II and prisoner of war held by the Japanese from 1942 to 1945, in which she served as chief nurse for the eleven other imprisoned Navy nurses—known as the "Twelve Anchors"
- Donnie Cochran – first African-American aviator assigned to the U.S. Navy Flight Demonstration Squadron (Blue Angels)
- William Cooper – After the navy, he worked for Naval Intelligence. After the Kennedy assassination, he became a "conspiracy theorists" and wrote the book "Behold the Pale Horse".
- William J. Crowe – USNA class ‘47, Four-star admiral, 12th Commander of United States Pacific Command, 11th Chairman of the Joint Chiefs of Staff, 5th Chair of the Intelligence Oversight Board, 10th Chair of the President’s Intelligence Advisory Board, Ambassador to the United Kingdom, Presidential Medal of Freedom recipient.
- Duke Cunningham – naval aviator, former member of the US House of Representatives
- Dorothy Still Danner – navy nurse and lieutenant junior grade in World War II and prisoner of war held by the Japanese from 1942 to 1945, one of the "Twelve Anchors"
- Glenn Robert Davis – former member of the U.S. House of Representatives
- Stephen Decatur – hero of Tripoli
- Terry Deitz – naval aviator, TV presenter and former Survivor contestant
- Robert Dennison – retired admiral, presidential aide
- Jeremiah Denton – American politician and naval aviator who while being held captive in a North Vietnamese POW camp participated in a 1966 televised propaganda interview in which he blinked his eyes in Morse code, spelling the word "torture" and confirming for the first time to U.S. Naval Intelligence that American POWs were being tortured.
- P.T. Deutermann – author, former United States Navy captain
- George Dewey – hero of the Battle of Manila Bay in Spanish–American War; first and only Admiral of the Navy
- Hunter Ellis – naval aviator, TV presenter and former Survivor contestant
- David Farragut – American Civil War admiral, first officer to become an admiral
- Lillian E. Fishburne – first African-American female to hold the rank of rear admiral
- Wilson Flagg – retired admiral, killed in the September 11 attack
- Eugene B. Fluckey – rear admiral who received the Medal of Honor and four Navy Crosses during his service as a submarine commander in World War II
- Gerald Ford – former U.S. President; served aboard carrier during World War II
- Edmund Giambastiani – 7th Vice Chairman of the Joint Chiefs of Staff
- Leroy Gilbert – former officer in the United States Navy and Chaplain of the United States Coast Guard.
- Samuel L. Gravely, Jr. – first African-American to be promoted to flag rank
- William Halsey, Jr. – Third Fleet commander, won battles off Guadalcanal and the Solomons; Fleet Admiral (5 stars)
- Andy Harris – U.S. representative and physician
- Gary Hart – U.S. Senator and presidential candidate
- Owen P. Honors, Jr. – captain, former CO of USS Enterprise (CVN-65)
- Esek Hopkins – first Commander in Chief of the Navy during the Revolutionary War
- Grace Hopper – futurist, early computing pioneer, rear admiral in the Navy Reserve
- George Howard, Jr. – first African-American federal judge in Arkansas history; served in World War II.
- Isaac Hull – captain of USS Constitution
- Lyndon B. Johnson – former U.S. President; worked as a bomb observer with the Army during World War II
- John Paul Jones – commander during the American Revolutionary War, considered to be the founder of the American naval tradition
- Charles Keating – naval aviator, real estate developer and banker
- Robert Kelly – Executive Officer of Motor Torpedo Boat Squadron 3 under Lieutenant John D. Bulkeley, and as commander of Motor Torpedo Boat PT-34, based in the Philippines. Kelly took part in the operation to evacuate General Douglas MacArthur and his staff from Corregidor to Mindanao, on the night of March 12–13, 1942 and was subsequently awarded the Silver Star.
- John F. Kennedy – former U.S. President; decorated PT Boat commander in World War II
- Joseph P. Kennedy Jr. – naval aviator, elder brother of future President John F. Kennedy, killed in World War II.
- Robert Kerrey – former U.S. Senator; Navy SEAL commander during the Vietnam War and first SEAL officer to win the Medal of Honor for classified raid in which he lost his lower leg by a Viet Cong grenade.
- John Kerry – former U.S. Secretary of State and U.S. Senator from Massachusetts, was the Democratic nominee for President of the United States in the 2004 election against President George W. Bush; Navy SWCC officer who, while commanding a Swift boat during the Vietnam War, sustained three wounds in combat with the Viet Cong, for which he earned three Purple Heart medals. Was also awarded the Silver Star and the Bronze Star Medal for valorous conduct in separate military engagements.
- Ernest King – fleet admiral; former Chief of Naval Operations
- Nile Kinnick – naval aviator, Heisman Trophy winner
- William D. Leahy – first fleet admiral; first head of the Chiefs of Staff (before the post was renamed Chairman of the Joint Chiefs of Staff); former Chief of Naval Operations; former Governor of Puerto Rico; former U.S. ambassador to France
- Merle Macbain – public information officer whom Mount Macbain is named after
- Alfred Thayer Mahan – military strategist
- Richard Marcinko – author, founder and commander of SEAL Team Six
- J.W. Marriott, Jr. – chairman and CEO of Marriott International
- John McCain – senior U.S. Senator from Arizona and Republican presidential candidate in 2008; former naval aviator and POW
- Thomas McClelland – captain; served as commander, Amphibious Squadron FIVE, conducting advance force operations with the 13th Marine Expeditionary Unit against the Iraqi Army during Desert Storm
- Homer A. McCrerey – earth sciences futurist, Fleet Meteorologist and oceanographer
- Harvey Milk – first openly gay San Francisco supervisor. Assassinated November 27, 1978. Subject of the Academy Award-winning and National Film Registry documentary film The Times of Harvey Milk, as well as the bestselling book The Mayor of Castro Street: The Life and Times of Harvey Milk
- John Mitchell – the 67th attorney general of the United States under President Richard Nixon who was convicted of multiple crimes for his involvement in the Watergate scandal
- Michael Mullen – 28th Chief of Naval Operations; 17th Chairman of the Joint Chiefs of Staff
- Chester Nimitz – fleet admiral; former Chief of Naval Operations; signed for the U.S. when Japan formally surrendered on board USS Missouri (BB-63); class of carriers named after him
- Richard Nixon – U.S. President who resigned after the Watergate scandal; supply officer in World War II
- Rear Admiral William S. "Deak" Parsons, USN, assistant chief of the Bureau of Ordnance, known for assembling (in flight) the triggering mechanism of the atomic bomb "Little Boy" aboard the Enola Gay.
- Ross Perot – business magnate, billionaire, politician, philanthropist
- Matthew Perry – commodore who forced the opening of Japan
- Oliver Hazard Perry – commanded the Battle of Lake Erie
- John Poindexter – served as National Security Advisor
- John D. Price – admiral who, early in his career, set many records as a naval aviator
- Eli Thomas Reich – vice admiral, only submariner to sink a Japanese battleship unaided during WW2
- Jamila Reinhardt – naval aviator, current player on the USA Rugby women's national team
- Hyman G. Rickover – admiral, "Father of the Nuclear Navy"
- David Robinson – former NBA star (San Antonio Spurs), commonly nicknamed "The Admiral"
- George Lincoln Rockwell – U.S. Navy commander and founder of the American Nazi Party
- Theodore Roosevelt IV – Special Warfare, great grandson of President Theodore Roosevelt and a prominent conservationist and environmentalist
- Donald Rumsfeld – naval aviator, served two times as Secretary of Defense
- Larry Seaquist – current Democratic member in the Washington House of Representatives; former captain of the Battleship USS Iowa (BB-61)
- Tim Sheehy – U.S. Senator from Montana and former Navy SEAL
- Rodger W. Simpson – distinguished himself during World War II, recipient of 2 Navy Crosses
- Charlie Siragusa – lifelong special investigator, undercover operative, spymaster and federal agent for the Federal Bureau of Narcotics, a precursor to the modern DEA
- John Philip Sousa – composer and conductor of the late Romantic era known primarily for American military marches including "The Stars and Stripes Forever" and "Semper Fidelis" (official march of the Marine Corps)
- Paul Spangler – naval surgeon, senior long-distance runner
- Raymond A. Spruance – commander at the Battle of Midway, led the Fifth Fleet in the Central Pacific and Okinawa. Rebuilt the Naval War College after World War II
- Jackson T. Stephens – investment banker
- James Stockdale – USNA class of 47, Vice Admiral, one of the most highly decorated officers in the history of the navy, Vice Presidential Candidate (1992), highest ranking officer to be held captive for 7 years in Vietnam, Presidential Medal of Freedom recipient,
- Stansfield Turner – USNA Class of 47, Four star Admiral, Commander of U.S. Second Fleet, Supreme Allied Commander NATO Southern Europe, 12th Director of the CIA (Carter administration), President of the Naval War College, first member of a military academy to be awarded the Rhodes Scholarship.
- Blake Wayne Van Leer, commander and captain in the U.S. Navy. Lead SeaBee program and managed the nuclear research and power unit at McMurdo Station during Operation Deep Freeze.
- Don Walsh – captain, submarine officer, navy diver, oceanographer and marine policy specialist. While aboard the bathyscaphe Trieste, he and Jacques Piccard made a record maximum descent in the Challenger Deep on January 23, 1960, to 35,813 feet (10,916 m). Later and more accurate measurements have measured it at 35,798 feet (10,911 m).
- Patrick M. Walsh – admiral, Vice Chief of Naval Operations
- Helen Turner Watson – one of the first African American women to receive a Navy commission, as ensign in 1945.
- Robert F. Willard – admiral, former Vice Chief of Naval Operations
- Jocko Willink – lieutenant commander, author, podcaster, retired Navy SEAL and former member of SEAL Team 3
- John Wooden – famous college basketball coach

== Astronauts ==
- Neil Armstrong – naval aviator (Korean War), X-15 pilot, astronaut Gemini 8 and Apollo 11, first man on the Moon
- Alan Bean – naval aviator and astronaut (Apollo 12 and Skylab 3)
- David M. Brown – captain, flight surgeon and astronaut killed in the Columbia Space Shuttle disaster (STS-107)
- Scott Carpenter – naval aviator, astronaut, Mercury 7
- Christopher Cassidy – Navy SEAL, astronaut STS-127, Soyuz TMA-08M (Expedition 35/36), Soyuz MS-16 (Expedition 62/63)
- Gene Cernan – naval aviator, astronaut (Gemini 9), Lunar Module Pilot (Apollo 10), Commander of Apollo 17 (last man on moon)
- Roger Chaffee – naval aviator and astronaut who perished in the Apollo 1 fire
- Laurel Clark – captain, flight surgeon and astronaut killed in the Columbia Space Shuttle disaster (STS-107)
- Pete Conrad – naval aviator, astronaut (Gemini 5 and 11, Apollo 12 and Skylab 2)
- Robert Crippen – naval aviator, astronaut (STS-1, STS-7, STS-41-C and STS-41-G)
- Walter Cunningham – naval aviator and astronaut (Apollo 7)
- Ronald Evans – naval aviator, astronaut (Apollo 17)
- Owen Garriott – astronaut (Skylab 3)
- Robert L. Gibson – naval aviator and astronaut (STS-41-B, STS-61-C, STS-27, STS-47, STS-71)
- John Glenn – naval aviator, astronaut, U.S. Senator from Ohio, and first American to orbit the Earth (Mercury-Atlas 6)
- Victor Glover – naval aviator, test pilot, astronaut and first black man to fly to the moon (Artemis II, SpaceX Crew-1)
- Richard F. Gordon, Jr. – naval aviator, astronaut (Gemini 11 and Apollo 12)
- Mark Kelly – naval aviator, astronaut (STS-108, STS-121, STS-124, STS-134)
- Scott Kelly – naval aviator, astronaut (STS-103, STS-118)
- Joseph Kerwin – astronaut (Skylab 2)
- Susan Kilrain – astronaut (STS-83 and STS-94)
- Wendy Lawrence – naval aviator, astronaut (STS-67, STS-86, STS-91, STS-114)
- Jim Lovell – naval aviator, astronaut (Gemini 7 and 12, Apollo 8 and 13)
- Ken Mattingly – naval aviator, astronaut (Apollo 16)
- Bruce McCandless II – naval aviator, astronaut who completed the first untethered spacewalk by using the Manned Maneuvering Unit (STS-41-B, STS-31)
- William C. McCool – naval aviator, astronaut, pilot of Columbia mission STS-107
- Edgar Mitchell – naval aviator and astronaut (Apollo 14)
- Lisa Nowak – naval aviator and astronaut (STS-121)
- Alan G. Poindexter – naval aviator, son of John Poindexter and astronaut (STS-122, STS-131)
- Wally Schirra – naval aviator, astronaut (Mercury 8, Gemini 6A and Apollo 7)
- Alan Shepard – naval aviator and flag officer (Rear Admiral), first American in space (Mercury-Redstone 3) and Apollo 14 commander
- William Shepherd – Navy SEAL, astronaut (STS-27, STS-41, STS-52)
- Thomas P. Stafford – aviator and astronaut (Gemini 6A, Gemini 9A, Apollo 10)
- Heidemarie Stefanyshyn-Piper – astronaut (STS-115, STS-126)
- Richard Truly – naval aviator and flag officer (Vice Admiral), Manned Orbiting Laboratory and Space Shuttle astronaut, serving as pilot for both Space Shuttle Enterprise landing tests and on second orbital test flight (STS-2). Later became first astronaut to serve as NASA Administrator under President George H.W. Bush.
- Paul J. Weitz – astronaut (Skylab 2)
- Reid Wiseman – naval aviator, test pilot, astronaut and oldest person to fly to the moon (Artemis II, Soyuz TMA-13M)
- John Young – naval aviator, astronaut (Gemini 3 and 10, Apollo 10 and 16, Shuttle flight STS-1 and STS-9)

== Others ==
- Frank Abagnale – security consultant, author and convicted felon who became notorious for impersonating a pilot, a doctor and a lawyer; his life was dramatized in the 2002 Oscar-nominated film Catch Me If You Can
- John Agar – actor (Sands of Iwo Jima, Fort Apache)
- Ralph Ahn – actor and brother of fellow sailor Susan Ahn Cuddy (The Golden Girls, New Girl)
- Susan Ahn – first female gunnery officer and Asian-American woman to join the U.S. Navy, sister of actor and fellow sailor Ralph Ahn
- Eddie Albert – Oscar-nominated actor (Roman Holiday)
- Arthur Leigh Allen – prime suspect in the Zodiac Killer case
- Kirk Alyn – first actor to play Superman in live-action (Superman)
- Bobby Anderson – child actor and television producer (It's a Wonderful Life)
- Ernie Anderson – radio and television personality, horror host and announcer (Hard Eight)
- Jake Angeli – activist and conspiracy theorist who was convicted for his participation in the 2021 U.S. Capitol riots, also known as the "QAnon Shaman"
- Arthur Arling – Oscar-winning cinematographer (The Yearling)
- John Eric Armstrong – American serial killer
- Robert Arthur – actor (Ace in the Hole, Twelve O'Clock High)
- Red Auerbach – professional basketball coach, executive and head coach of the Boston Celtics
- James Avery – actor (The Fresh Prince of Bel-Air)
- Hoyt Axton – singer-songwriter, guitarist and actor (The Black Stallion, Gremlins)
- David Ayer – director and screenwriter (Fury, End of Watch, Training Day)
- Lloyd Bacon – actor and film director (42nd Street)
- Russell Baker – Pulitzer Prize-winning journalist, satirical writer, author (Growing Up)
- Bob Barker – naval aviator, Emmy Award-winning host of The Price is Right
- John Drew Barrymore – actor, enlisted in the Navy during WWII at age 13 (The Big Night, Rawhide)
- Hall Bartlett – Oscar-nominated filmmaker and actor (Navajo, Zero Hour!, Jonathan Livingston Seagull)
- Ed Begley, Sr. – Oscar-winning actor (12 Angry Men)
- Harry Belafonte – Emmy, Grammy and Tony Award-winning singer and actor (BlacKkKlansman)
- April D. Beldo – retired Fleet Master Chief for Manpower, Personnel, Training and Education (MPT&E)
- Bob Bell – actor and announcer famous for his alter-ego, Bozo the Clown
- Nathaniel Benchley – author (The Off-Islanders)
- Nick Benedict – Emmy-nominated actor (Days of Our Lives, All My Children)
- Tex Beneke – saxophonist, singer and bandleader
- Bruce Bennett – Olympic athlete and actor (The Treasure of the Sierra Madre)
- Jack Benny – Emmy and Golden Globe Award-winning actor (The Jack Benny Program)
- Shelley Berman – Emmy-nominated and Grammy Award-winning actor (Curb Your Enthusiasm)
- Yogi Berra – baseball Hall of Famer, catcher for the New York Yankees
- Charles Bickford – Oscar-nominated actor (A Star Is Born)
- Hunter Biden – attorney, hedge fund investor and son of U.S. President Joe Biden
- Charles Alden Black – businessman known for his work in aquaculture and oceanography, husband of child star Shirley Temple
- Larry J. Blake – actor (Earth vs. the Flying Saucers, The Werewolf)
- John Boehner – 53rd Speaker of the United States House of Representatives, served 8 weeks in the Navy before being medically discharged
- Rudy Boesch – Navy SEAL, competitor on Survivor
- Humphrey Bogart – Oscar-winning actor (Casablanca)
- Tommy Bond – actor (Superman)
- Richard Boone – actor (The Shootist)
- Ernest Borgnine – Oscar-winning actor (Marty)
- Tom Bosley – Emmy Award-nominated and Tony Award-winning actor (Happy Days)
- Peter Boyle – Emmy Award-winning actor (Young Frankenstein)
- Christopher "Big Black" Boykin – Star of MTV's Rob & Big television series
- Ben Bradlee – managing editor of The Washington Post known for his role in exposing the Watergate scandal
- John Bradley – navy hospital corpsman known for raising the first U.S. flag during the Battle of Iwo Jima
- Scott Brady – actor (The China Syndrome, Gremlins)
- Carl Brashear – first African American master diver
- Henry Breault – the first submariner and so far only enlisted submariner to be awarded the Medal of Honor for actions aboard a United States submarine
- Peter Breck – actor (Maverick, Benji)
- Richard L. Breen – Oscar-winning screenwriter (Titanic, Captain Newman, M.D.)
- James Broderick – Emmy-nominated actor (Family)
- Dean Brooks – actor and physician (One Flew Over the Cuckoo's Nest)
- Bruce Brown – Oscar-nominated documentary filmmaker and early pioneer of the surf film (The Endless Summer, On Any Sunday)
- Paul Brown – American football coach and executive in the AAFC and NFL
- Lenny Bruce – stand-up comedian, social critic and satirist
- Eugene Burdick – political scientist, novelist (Fail-Safe, The Ugly American)
- Raymond Burr – Emmy Award-winning and Golden Globe-nominated actor (Rear Window, Perry Mason, Ironside)
- Leo Buscaglia – author, motivational speaker and professor, also known as "Dr. Love"
- Daws Butler – voice actor (Yogi Bear, Huckleberry Hound)
- Pete Buttigieg – United States Secretary of Transportation and 32nd mayor of South Bend, Indiana
- Adolph Caesar – Oscar-nominated actor (A Soldier's Story, The Color Purple)
- Joseph Campanella – Emmy and Tony Award-nominated actor (Mannix, The Bold and the Beautiful)
- Archie Campbell – actor and comedian (Hee Haw)
- Vincent Canby – film critic for The New York Times
- Harry Carey Jr. – actor (The Searchers)
- Carleton Carpenter – actor (Father of the Bride, Take the High Ground!)
- Johnny Carson – Emmy and Peabody Award-winning and Golden Globe-nominated host of The Tonight Show
- William J. Casey – Director of Central Intelligence from 1981 to 1987
- Seymour Cassel – Oscar-nominated actor (Faces)
- Cesar Chavez – civil rights activist who co-founded the National Farm Workers Association, which later became the United Farm Workers
- Tom Cherones – Emmy Award-winning television director and producer known for his work on Seinfeld
- James H. Clark – American entrepreneur, founder of Netscape
- Richard Clayton – actor and talent agent (High Sierra)
- Lee Van Cleef – actor (The Good, the Bad and the Ugly)
- Preston Cloud – American scientist
- Jerry Clower – country comedian
- Junior Coghlan – actor, career naval officer (Our Gang comedies, Men of Boys Town)
- Nicholas Colasanto – Emmy Award-nominated actor (Cheers)
- John Coltrane – Grammy and Pulitzer Prize-winning jazz musician
- O'Neal Compton – actor (Seinfeld)
- Jackie Cooper – Oscar-nominated actor who retired as a captain (Skippy, The Champ)
- James Fenimore Cooper – author (The Last of the Mohicans)
- Glenn Corbett – actor (Route 66)
- Jeff Corey – actor (Butch Cassidy and the Sundance Kid)
- Roger Corman – film director, producer, actor, trailblazer in independent film (House of Usher)
- Bill Cosby – Emmy and Golden Globe Award-winning actor, comedian, educational philanthropist (The Cosby Show)
- Paul Crawford – jazz musician, music arranger and music historian who specialized in Dixieland jazz
- Tim Credeur – mixed martial artist and cast member of The Ultimate Fighter 7
- Dan Crenshaw – American politician and former Navy SEAL officer
- Tony Curtis – Oscar-nominated actor (Some Like It Hot)
- James Daly – Emmy-winning actor (Planet of the Apes)
- Jack Davis – cartoonist, illustrator and a founding cartoonist of MAD Magazine
- Dennis Day – actor, comedian and singer (The Jack Benny Program)
- Richard Denning – actor (Creature from the Black Lagoon)
- Ron DeSantis – 46th governor of Florida
- Billy De Wolfe – actor (The World's Greatest Athlete)
- Bill Dickey – baseball Hall of Famer, manager and catcher for the New York Yankees
- Matt Dillahunty – former host of the televised webcast The Atheist Experience
- Bradford Dillman – Emmy and Golden Globe Award-winning actor (The Way We Were, Compulsion)
- Larry Doby – second black player to break baseball's color barrier and first black player in the American League
- Lou Donaldson – jazz alto saxophonist
- Richard Donner – Emmy-nominated director and producer (Superman)
- Paul Dooley – Emmy-nominated actor and comedian (Breaking Away)
- Kirk Douglas – Oscar-nominated actor and producer (Spartacus)
- Mike Douglas – Emmy Award-winning host of The Mike Douglas Show, "Big Band" era singer and actor
- Rex Downing – child actor (Our Gang, Wuthering Heights)
- William Duell – actor and singer (One Flew Over the Cuckoo's Nest)
- George Duning – musician and film composer (From Here to Eternity, 3:10 to Yuma)
- Fred Durst – rapper, frontman and lyricist of Limp Bizkit, and director (The Fanatic)
- Louis Edmonds – Emmy-nominated actor (Dark Shadows, All My Children)
- Anthony Eisley – actor and TV writer (Hawaiian Eye)
- Jack Elam – actor (The Cannonball Run)
- Dana Elcar – actor (The Sting)
- Josip Elic – actor (One Flew Over the Cuckoo's Nest)
- Leif Erickson – actor (On the Waterfront)
- Tom Ewell – Emmy-nominated, Tony Award-winning and Golden Globe Award-winning actor and producer (The Seven Year Itch)
- Douglas Fairbanks, Jr. – Hollywood Golden Age actor (Little Caesar)
- Gordy Falk – legendary pumpkin carver, nicknamed the "Pumpkin Man", and former naval intelligence officer
- Bob Feller – baseball Hall of Famer, pitcher for the Cleveland Indians
- John Fiedler – actor and voice actor (12 Angry Men, voice of Piglet in the Winnie the Pooh franchise)
- Antwone Fisher – author and film producer, subject of 2002 feature film Antwone Fisher
- Paul Fix – actor (To Kill a Mockingbird, The Rifleman)
- Eric Fleming – actor (Rawhide)
- A.D. Flowers – Oscar-winning visual effects artist (The Poseidon Adventure, The Godfather)
- Larry Flynt – publisher of Hustler
- Henry Fonda – Oscar-winning actor and producer (The Grapes of Wrath, 12 Angry Men)
- Glenn Ford – Golden Globe-winning actor (Blackboard Jungle)
- Henry Ford II – former CEO of Ford Motor Company, grandson of Henry Ford
- John Ford – Rear Admiral, Oscar-winning director (The Searchers)
- John Foreman – Oscar-nominated producer (Butch Cassidy and the Sundance Kid, Prizzi's Honor)
- Jack Fortner – member of the Arkansas House of Representatives
- Bob Fosse – Oscar-winning director (Cabaret)
- Douglas Fowley – actor (Singin' in the Rain)
- William A. Fraker – Oscar-nominated cinematographer (Bullitt, Rosemary's Baby)
- Warren Frost – actor (Twin Peaks, Seinfeld)
- Verne Gagne – professional wrestler, football player and actor (The Wrestler)
- Chris Gardner – self-made millionaire, philanthropist who previously struggled with homelessness, subject of feature film The Pursuit of Happyness
- Tay Garnett – director and screenwriter (The Postman Always Rings Twice)
- Dave Garroway – Emmy-nominated television and radio personality (NBC's Today)
- Dick Gautier – actor, comedian and singer (Get Smart)
- John Gavin – Golden Globe-winning actor (Psycho)
- Arthur Hill Gilbert – impressionist painter
- Art Gilmore – actor and TV and radio announcer (Yankee Doodle Dandy, The Nutty Professor)
- Russ Goetz – professional baseball umpire
- Don Gordon – Emmy Award-nominated actor (Bullitt)
- Freeman Gosden – radio comedian, actor and sitcom pioneer (Amos 'n' Andy)
- Calvin Graham – At age 12, Graham became the youngest U.S. serviceman to serve and fight in WWII. Graham later served in the U.S. Marine Corps during the Korean War.
- Farley Granger – Emmy Award-nominated actor (Strangers on a Train)
- Bud Grant – NFL and CFL football player and coach (Minnesota Vikings)
- Lawrence Gray – actor (Children of Pleasure)
- Walter Greaza – actor (Call Northside 777)
- Shecky Greene – actor and comedian (History of the World, Part I, Splash)
- Benji Gregory – child actor (ALF)
- James Gregory – actor (The Manchurian Candidate)
- Elliadria "Persuasian" Griffin – reality TV star (Bad Girls Club: Season 16)
- Raymond Griffith – silent film actor and comedian (All Quiet on the Western Front)
- Alfred Grossman – writer and novelist
- Harry Guardino – actor (Dirty Harry)
- Robert Gunner – Film and TV actor (Planet of the Apes)
- Fred Gwynne – actor (The Munsters, Pet Sematary, My Cousin Vinny)
- Hard Boiled Haggerty – professional wrestler, football player and actor (Foxy Brown, Earthquake)
- David Hahn – American nuclear radiation enthusiast who attempted to build a homemade nuclear reactor at the age of seventeen (aka the "Radioactive Boy Scout" and the "Nuclear Boy Scout")
- Fred Haines – Oscar-nominated screenwriter and director (Ulysses)
- H.R. Haldeman – White House Chief of Staff known for his involvement in the Watergate scandal
- Brett Halsey – Golden Globe-winning actor (Return to Peyton Place, Return of the Fly, The Godfather Part III)
- Pete Hamill – journalist, novelist, essayist and editor (New York Post)
- MC Hammer – Grammy Award-winning rap artist
- Ron Harper – actor (Planet of the Apes, 87th Precinct)
- Richard Benjamin Harrison – businessman, reality television personality (Pawn Stars)
- Gary Hart – former U.S. Senator from Colorado
- Herk Harvey – director, screenwriter, actor, film producer (Carnival of Souls)
- Byron Haskin – Oscar-nominated director, special effects artist and cinematographer (The War of the Worlds)
- Bill Hayes – actor and recording artist who also served in the U.S. Marine Corps (The Cardinal, "The Ballad of Davy Crockett")
- Lloyd Haynes – Emmy Award-nominated actor (Room 222, Ice Station Zebra)
- David Hedison – actor (The Fly, The Enemy Below, Live and Let Die)
- Thomas Heggen – Tony Award-winning author and playwright (Mister Roberts)
- Robert A. Heinlein – science fiction author (Starship Troopers)
- Lance Henriksen – actor (Aliens)
- Frank Herbert – science fiction author (Dune)
- James Leo Herlihy – actor, playwright and novelist (All Fall Down, Midnight Cowboy)
- Don Hewitt – television news producer, executive and creator of 60 Minutes on CBS
- Chuck Hicks – actor and stuntman (Raging Bull)
- Steven Hill – Emmy Award-nominated actor (Law & Order)
- Barron Hilton – heir and co-chairman of Hilton Hotels
- Pat Hingle – actor (Splendor in the Grass, Norma Rae)
- Winton C. Hoch – Oscar-winning cinematographer (The Searchers, The Quiet Man)
- Earl Holliman – Golden Globe-winning actor, singer and animal-rights activist (Giant)
- William Hopper – Navy UDT, son of Hedda Hopper, Emmy Award-nominated actor (The Bad Seed, Perry Mason)
- George L. Howe – Christopher Award-winning author, architect and OSS officer in World War II whose experiences were the basis of his novel Call It Treason adapted as the 1951 Oscar-nominated film Decision Before Dawn
- L. Ron Hubbard – science fiction author and founder of the Church of Scientology
- Rock Hudson – Oscar-nominated actor (Giant)
- William Bradford Huie – author (The Americanization of Emily)
- Howard Hunt – intelligence officer and author known for his involvement in the Watergate scandal
- Evan Hunter – author (The Blackboard Jungle, Last Summer, King's Ransom)
- Jeffrey Hunter – actor (The Searchers)
- Rick James – Grammy Award-winning musician, singer-songwriter and record producer
- Dean Jones – Grammy Award-winning and Golden Globe-nominated actor (The Love Bug, The Million Dollar Duck)
- L.Q. Jones – actor, director and screenwriter (A Boy and His Dog, The Wild Bunch)
- Buck Kartalian – actor and professional wrestler (Cool Hand Luke, Planet of the Apes)
- Bill Kaysing – founder of the Moon landing conspiracy movement
- Ray Kellogg – special effects artist and film director (The Green Berets)
- Gene Kelly – Oscar-nominated actor, filmmaker, dancer, singer (Singin' in the Rain)
- Robert F. Kennedy – lawyer and politician, 64th United States Attorney General, U.S. Senator from New York, brother of fellow sailor President John F. Kennedy
- Jack Kerouac – novelist, poet and pioneer of the Beat Generation (On the Road)
- Hank Ketcham – cartoonist who created the Dennis the Menace comic strip
- Richard Kiley – Emmy and Golden Globe-winning actor (Blackboard Jungle)
- Carl Kimmons – first person to rise through the ranks from mess attendant to commissioned officer
- Ralph Kiner – baseball Hall of Famer, outfielder for the Pittsburgh Pirates
- Durward Kirby – television host and announcer (The Garry Moore Show, Candid Camera)
- Richard H. Kline – Oscar-nominated cinematographer (Soylent Green, King Kong)
- Fletcher Knebel – author (Seven Days in May)
- Fred J. Koenekamp – Oscar-winning cinematographer (Patton, Papillon)
- Harvey Korman – Emmy and Golden Globe Award-winning actor and comedian (Blazing Saddles)
- Nancy Kulp – Emmy and Grammy Award-nominated actress (The Beverly Hillbillies)
- Bill Kurtis – television journalist and narrator (Cold Case Files, American Justice)
- Chris Kyle – Navy SEAL sniper and author of American Sniper
- Bert Lahr – actor (The Wizard of Oz)
- Archie Lang – actor (Blow Out)
- Robert LaSardo – actor (Nip/Tuck)
- Sydney Lassick – actor (One Flew Over the Cuckoo's Nest, Carrie)
- Paul Le Mat – Golden Globe-winning actor (American Graffiti)
- Jack Lemmon – Oscar-winning actor, director and musician (The Apartment)
- C.W. Lemoine – author, fighter pilot and YouTuber who also served as an aviator in the U.S. Air Force
- Elmore Leonard – Edgar Award-winning novelist and screenwriter (Get Shorty, Jackie Brown, Out of Sight, 3:10 to Yuma, Hombre)
- Raymond Lisle – attorney, officer in the United States Foreign Service and Dean of Brooklyn Law School
- John Lodge – actor and 79th governor of Connecticut (Little Women)
- Marcus Luttrell – Navy SEAL, Navy Cross and Purple Heart for Operation Red Wings, author of Lone Survivor
- Tyler MacDuff – actor (Gunsmoke, Maverick)
- Richard Machowicz – Navy SEAL and host of Future Weapons
- Guy Madison – Golden Globe-winning actor (The Adventures of Wild Bill Hickok)
- Daniel P. Mannix – author (The Fox and the Hound, Those About to Die)
- James Margolis – Olympic fencer
- Jennifer Marshall – actress (Stranger Things)
- Dewey Martin – naval aviator held as a prisoner of war until Japan's surrender, actor (The Thing from Another World, Battleground)
- Strother Martin – Golden Globe-nominated actor (Cool Hand Luke)
- Tony Martin – Emmy Award-nominated singer and actor (The Big Store)
- Al Martino – actor and singer (The Godfather)
- Robert K. Massie – Pulitzer Prize-winning author, journalist and historian (Nicholas and Alexandra)
- Armistead Maupin – author and gay rights activist
- Donald May – actor (Colt .45, The Edge of Night)
- Napoleon McCallum – NFL running back (Los Angeles Raiders)
- Country Joe McDonald – musician and lead singer of the 1960s psychedelic rock group Country Joe and the Fish
- Bill McKinney – actor (The Outlaw Josey Wales)
- Ralph Meeker – actor (Kiss Me Deadly)
- Herman Melville – novelist, short story writer and poet of the American Renaissance period (Moby-Dick)
- Jan Merlin – actor, television writer and author (Take the Money and Run, Them!)
- James Michener – Pulitzer Prize-winning novelist (Tales of the South Pacific)
- Dick Miller – actor (Gremlins)
- Doris Miller – attack on Pearl Harbor hero, first Black recipient of the Navy Cross
- J.P. Miller – playwright, novelist and screenwriter (Days of Wine and Roses)
- Guy Mitchell – pop singer and actor (Whispering Smith)
- Ray Montgomery – actor (White Heat, Johnny Belinda)
- Robert Montgomery – WWII Lt Commander on USS Barton (DD-722), Oscar-nominated actor (Here Comes Mr. Jordan)
- Ronald D. Moore – Peabody and Emmy Award-winning screenwriter and television producer (Star Trek: The Next Generation, Battlestar Galactica)
- Glenn Morris – Olympic athlete and actor (Tarzan's Revenge)
- Wayne Morris – naval aviator and actor (Paths of Glory)
- Vic Morrow – Emmy Award-nominated actor (The Bad News Bears)
- Robert Morse – Emmy and Tony Award-winning actor (How to Succeed in Business Without Really Trying)
- George Moscone – 37th mayor of San Francisco who, along with fellow sailor Harvey Milk, was assassinated by Dan White
- Richard Mulligan – Emmy and Golden Globe Award-winning actor (Empty Nest)
- Robert Mulligan – Oscar-nominated filmmaker (To Kill a Mockingbird)
- Charlie Murphy – entertainer and brother of comedian Eddie Murphy (Chappelle's Show)
- George Nader – Golden Globe Award-winning actor and writer (Robot Monster)
- Ed Nelson – actor (Airport 1975, Runaway Jury)
- Paul Newman – Oscar-winning actor, filmmaker, producer and race car driver (The Hustler, Cool Hand Luke, The Sting)
- Tommy Noonan – actor, screenwriter, producer (Gentlemen Prefer Blondes, Swingin' Along)
- Jay North – actor best known for playing the titular role in the 1959 television series Dennis the Menace
- George O'Brien – silent era actor (Sunrise: A Song of Two Humans)
- Pat O'Brien – Emmy Award-winning actor (Knute Rockne, All American)
- Frank O'Hara – writer, poet and art critic
- Robert J. O'Neill – Navy SEAL, participated in Operation Neptune Spear
- Jerry Paris – Emmy Award-winning actor (The Dick Van Dyke Show)
- Fess Parker – Emmy-nominated film and TV actor (Old Yeller, Davy Crockett)
- Robert Parrish – Oscar-winning film editor and director (Body and Soul, Casino Royale)
- Vincent Pastore – actor (The Sopranos)
- Dennis Patrick – actor (Joe, House of Dark Shadows, Major Dundee)
- Dick Peabody – actor (Combat!, Support Your Local Sheriff!)
- D.A. Pennebaker – documentary filmmaker (Primary, Monterey Pop)
- Jack Pennick – actor (Mister Roberts, The Searchers)
- Tom Peters – bestselling author (In Search of Excellence)
- Oscar V. Peterson – chief petty officer who received the Medal of Honor posthumously in WWII for his actions during the Battle of the Coral Sea
- Regis Philbin – Emmy Award-winning talk show host (Regis and Kelly)
- John Pickard – actor (True Grit)
- Jack Pickford – actor (Tom Sawyer)
- Bella Poarch – social media personality, singer and songwriter
- Darryl Ponicsan – Golden Globe-nominated screenwriter and novelist (The Last Detail, Cinderella Liberty)
- Gordon Prange – author and historian (Tora! Tora! Tora!)
- Tito Puente – Grammy Award-winning musician, songwriter, record producer and bandleader (The Simpsons: Who Shot Mr. Burns?)
- Denver Pyle – actor (The Dukes of Hazzard)
- Ernie Pyle – Pulitzer Prize–winning American journalist and war correspondent best known for his stories about ordinary American soldiers during World War II
- Thomas Pynchon – writer and novelist (Inherent Vice)
- Paul Raci – Oscar-nominated actor and sign-language interpreter for the California court system (Sound of Metal)
- John Bennett Ramsey – businessman, author and father of murder victim JonBenét Ramsey
- Aldo Ray – actor (Pat and Mike)
- Bert Remsen – actor and casting director (Nashville, Maverick)
- Gene Reynolds – Emmy Award-winning television producer, writer, director and actor (Boys Town, M*A*S*H)
- Sonny Rhodes – blues singer and lap steel guitar player known for composing the main title theme for the TV series Firefly
- Jeff Richards – Golden Globe-winning actor and baseball player (Seven Brides for Seven Brothers)
- Don Rickles – Emmy Award-winning stand-up comedian, actor and author (Kelly's Heroes)
- Bobby Riggs – pro tennis champion
- Phil Rizzuto – baseball Hall of Famer and shortstop for the New York Yankees
- Jason Robards – Oscar-winning actor (All the President's Men)
- Harold Robbins – author of popular novels (The Carpetbaggers)
- Marty Robbins – Grammy-winning musician, singer, songwriter, actor and NASCAR driver (Honkytonk Man)
- Edward G. Robinson – Hollywood Golden Age actor and Honorary Oscar recipient (Double Indemnity)
- Frank M. Robinson – speechwriter for politician Harvey Milk, author (The Glass Inferno adapted into the 1974 film The Towering Inferno)
- Norman Rockwell – American painter and illustrator
- Charles "Buddy" Rogers – naval aviator, actor and musician (Wings)
- Wayne Rogers – Golden Globe-nominated actor (M*A*S*H, House Calls)
- Ronnie Rondell Jr. – actor and stuntman (Speed, They Live)
- Theodore Isaac Rubin – psychiatrist and author (David and Lisa)
- Joe Ruby – animator, writer, television producer, music editor (Scooby-Doo)
- Mitchell Ryan – actor (Lethal Weapon)
- Gene Saks – Tony Award-winning director and actor (The Odd Couple, Cactus Flower)
- Soupy Sales – comedian (The Soupy Sales Show)
- Franklin J. Schaffner – Oscar-winning director (Planet of the Apes, Patton)
- Budd Schulberg – Oscar-winning screenwriter, television producer, novelist and sports writer (On the Waterfront, A Face in the Crowd)
- Arnold Schulman – Academy-Award nominated screenwriter, producer, playwright, novelist (Love with the Proper Stranger)
- Rick Scott – U.S. senator and 45th governor of Florida
- Willard Scott – Emmy Award-winning weather presenter, actor, clown, creator and original portrayer of Ronald McDonald
- Vin Scully – American sportscaster
- Kabir Sehgal – Multi-Grammy and Emmy winning artist and NYT bestselling author
- Bill Sharman – member of the Basketball Hall of Fame (Boston Celtics)
- Sammy Shore – actor, comedian and co-founder of The Comedy Store
- Frank Silvera – Tony Award-nominated actor (Viva Zapata!)
- Mickey Simpson – actor (Giant)
- Dick Sisler – baseball player (St. Louis Cardinals)
- Hugh Sloan – Republican former treasurer of the Committee to Re-elect the President for Richard Nixon's 1972 campaign committee during the Watergate scandal
- Jay R. Smith – actor (Specks in Our Gang)
- Sam Snead – professional golfer
- Ken Spears – animator, writer, TV producer, sound editor (Scooby-Doo)
- Robert Stack – host of Unsolved Mysteries and Oscar-nominated actor (Airplane!)
- Harry Dean Stanton – actor, musician and singer (Alien)
- Ray Stark – Oscar-nominated producer (Funny Girl, The Goodbye Girl)
- Roger Staubach – Vietnam veteran, football Hall of Famer (Dallas Cowboys)
- Rod Steiger – Oscar-winning actor (On the Waterfront, In the Heat of the Night)
- Adlai Stevenson II – 31st Governor of Illinois and two-time Presidential nominee
- McLean Stevenson – Emmy Award-nominated and Golden Globe-winning actor, writer and comedian (M*A*S*H)
- Donald Ogden Stewart – Oscar-winning screenwriter and author (The Philadelphia Story)
- Leonard Stone – Tony Award-winning actor (Willy Wonka & the Chocolate Factory)
- Larry Storch – Emmy Award-nominated actor and comedian (The Great Race)
- Dirk Wayne Summers – actor, producer, screenwriter, director (Kojak)
- David Susskind – film and TV producer, talk show host (A Raisin in the Sun)
- John Sutton – British actor (My Cousin Rachel, Return of the Fly)
- William Sylvester – actor (2001: A Space Odyssey)
- Buck Taylor – actor and artist (Gunsmoke)
- Robert Taylor – naval aviator and Hollywood Golden Age actor (Quo Vadis)
- Walter Tevis – novelist (The Hustler, The Color of Money, The Man Who Fell to Earth, The Queen’s Gambit)
- Russell Thacher – author and film producer (Soylent Green, Once Bitten)
- Bill Thompson – voice actor (Fibber McGee and Molly)
- Claude Thornhill – pianist, arranger, composer and bandleader
- Charles Tilly – sociologist, political scientist and historian
- Gregg Toland – Oscar-winning cinematographer (Citizen Kane, The Grapes of Wrath)
- James Tolkan – actor (Back to the Future, Serpico)
- Spencer Tracy – Oscar-winning actor (Judgment at Nuremberg)
- Tom Tryon – Golden Globe-nominated actor (The Cardinal) and novelist (The Other)
- Jerry Tucker – child actor (Our Gang short subjects)
- Tom Tully – Oscar-nominated actor (The Caine Mutiny)
- Lawrence Turman – Oscar-nominated producer (The Graduate)
- Rudy Vallée – singer, musician, actor and radio host (The Palm Beach Story)
- Norm Van Brocklin – NFL quarterback for the Los Angeles Rams and the Philadelphia Eagles
- Craig Venter – biologist instrumental in mapping the human genome
- Jesse Ventura – former Navy UDT, professional wrestler, 38th Governor of Minnesota and actor (Predator)
- Richard Venture – actor (Scent of a Woman)
- Mickey Vernon – baseball player, first baseman for the Cleveland Indians and Boston Red Sox
- Mike Wallace – Emmy and Golden Globe Award-winning journalist, game show host and media personality (60 Minutes)
- Edward Lewis Wallant – author of the 1961 novel The Pawnbroker which was adapted into the 1964 Oscar-nominated film of the same name
- Jack Warden – Oscar-nominated actor (12 Angry Men, Shampoo)
- John Warner – former Republican U.S. Senator from Virginia and U.S. Secretary of the Navy who later served as an officer in the U.S. Marine Corps; former husband of movie star Elizabeth Taylor
- Dennis Weaver – naval aviator and Emmy Award-winning actor (Touch of Evil)
- Paul Francis Webster – Oscar-winning lyricist (Rio Bravo, Mutiny on the Bounty)
- George Westinghouse – entrepreneur, engineer who created the railway air brake, and pioneer of the electrical industry
- Charles F. Wheeler – Oscar-nominated cinematographer (Tora! Tora! Tora!, Freaky Friday)
- Robb White – naval aviator, screenwriter and novelist (House on Haunted Hill)
- Ron White – Grammy Award-nominated comedian and actor (Horrible Bosses)
- George P. Wilbur – actor and stuntman (Halloween 4: The Return of Michael Myers)
- Charles Williams – author of crime fiction (Dead Calm, Hell Hath No Fury)
- Montel Williams – Emmy Award-winning talk show host (The Montel Williams Show)
- Roger Williams – popular music pianist (Swingin' Along)
- Sunita Williams – naval aviator and astronaut
- Ted Williams – naval aviator and baseball Hall of Famer for the Boston Red Sox, also served in the U.S. Marine Corps
- Butch Wilmore – navy test pilot and astronaut
- Walter Winchell – newspaper gossip columnist and radio news commentator
- Bill Withers – Grammy Award-winning singer-songwriter and musician
- Bob Woodward – Pulitzer Prize-winning investigative journalist, uncovered the Watergate scandal with Carl Bernstein
- Chuck Woolery – Daytime Emmy Award-nominated game show host (Wheel of Fortune, Greed)
- Jeremiah Wright – senior pastor, Trinity United Church of Christ; cardiopulmonary technician (surgery on President Lyndon B. Johnson, also ex-Navy)
- Delmer J. Yoakum – artist, motion picture studio scenic artist
- Bud Yorkin – Emmy-winning director (Divorce American Style, Come Blow Your Horn)
- Robert M. Young – Indie Spirit Award-nominated film director, cinematographer, screenwriter, producer (The Ballad of Gregorio Cortez, Alambrista!, American Me)
- Skip Young – actor (The Adventures of Ozzie and Harriet)
- Howard Zieff – film director (Private Benjamin, My Girl)
- Bill Zuckert – actor (Blazing Saddles, Tora! Tora! Tora!)

== Groups ==
- Golden Thirteen – the thirteen African-American enlisted men who became the first African-American commissioned officers in the United States Navy.
- The Port Chicago 50 – group of 50 African-American Sailors who refused to return to work until changes were made at the U.S. Navy's Port Chicago near San Francisco.
