= The Great Barrier (film) =

- Opening titles
- Directed by: Milton Rosmer; Geoffrey Barkas
- Written by: Michael Barringer; Ralph Spence; Emeric Pressburger; Milton Rosmer
- Based on: novel The Great Divide by Alan Sullivan
- Produced by: Günther Stapenhorst
- Starring: Richard Arlen; Antoinette Cellier; Barry MacKay; Lilli Palmer
- Cinematography: Sepp Allgeier; Glen MacWilliams; Robert Martin; Arthur Crabtree
- Edited by: Charles Frend; Ben Hipkins
- Music by: Hubert Bath; Jack Beaver; Louis Levy
- Production company: Gaumont British
- Distributed by: Gaumont British Distributors
- Release date: February 1937
- Running time: 83 minutes
- Country: United Kingdom
- Language: English
- Budget: £250,000

The Great Barrier is a 1937 British historical drama film directed by Milton Rosmer and Geoffrey Barkas and starring Richard Arlen, Lilli Palmer and Antoinette Cellier. The film depicts the construction of the Canadian Pacific Railway. It was based on the 1935 novel The Great Divide by Alan Sullivan. It was made at the Lime Grove Studios in Shepherd's Bush. The film's sets were designed by Walter Murton.

== Cast ==
- Richard Arlen as Hickey
- Lilli Palmer as Lou
- Antoinette Cellier as Mary Moody
- Barry MacKay as Steve
- Roy Emerton as Moody
- J. Farrell MacDonald as Major Rogers
- Ben Welden as Joe
- Jock MacKay as Bates
- Ernest Sefton as Magistrate
- Henry Victor as Bulldog Kelly
- Reginald Barlow as James Hill
- Arthur Loft as William Van Horne
- Frank McGlynn Sr. as Sir John MacDonald

== Production ==
It was one of a series of British Empire-related movies made by Gaumont around this time, others including Rhodes of Africa, The Flying Doctor and Soldiers Three.

The film involved 16 weeks location shooting in Canada.

Barbara Greene was borrowed from Fox. Location filming finished in June 1936.

On 19 May Variety reported production "has been postponed for awhile. Geoffrey Barkis, who was directing, has been replaced by Milton Rosmer, with reason given that Barkis is suffering from a nervous breakdown."

== Reception ==
Variety called it "One of the best pictures ever made by a British company, and ranks with the best made anywhere."

Writing for The Spectator in 1937, Graham Greene gives the film a generally good review, describing it as "a thoroughly worthy picture", "well acted, well produced [and] a little less than well written". Greene praised the saloon shindy and horseback race scenes, and commended Palmer's acting, however his primary criticism was that "it shrinks into significance, with its conventional love-story and the impression it leaves that the building of a railway depends on the heroic efforts of one or three men and a girl".

== Bibliography ==
- Cook, Pam. Gainsborough Pictures. Cassell, 1997.
