= Dobry =

1934 children's book by Monica Shannon

- Author: Monica Shannon
- Illustrator: Atanas Katchamakoff
- Language: English
- Genre: Children's novel
- Publisher: The Viking Press
- Publication date: 1934
- Publication place: United States
- Media type: Print (Hardback & Paperback)
- Pages: 176
- ISBN: 9780140363340

Dobry is a book by Monica Shannon first published in 1934 that won the Newbery Medal for most distinguished contribution to American literature for children in 1935. Bulgarian-born sculptor Atanas Katchamakoff illustrated the book.

== Plot summary ==
Dobry is a young boy who lives in a small farming village in Bulgaria with his widowed mother and grandfather. Both of them are dedicated farmers, and Dobry spends much of his early life helping them in the fields. The majority of his free time is spent with his best friend, Neda, the daughter of the village shoemaker.

While still young, Dobry discovers a found love for art, in which he displays an unusually high amount of natural talent. In order to pay for the art supplies he needs to practice, he takes on the job as the village cow herder, and spends the next several years honing his artistic skills. While Neda and Dobry's grandfather are impressed and supportive of his dedication to his craft, his mother becomes increasingly worried and agitated. She had always assumed that Dobry would take over the family farm as an adult, and sees the time that Dobry spends with his art as wasted time that he could be using to help with the work. However, Dobry's grandfather is slowly able to convince her that talent like his should be allowed to develop. When Dobry creates a beautiful snow sculpture of the nativity that the whole town praises, his mother finally realizes how skilled her son truly is.

At the following New Year celebration, Dobry's mother presents him with a surprise gift: money that she has saved up in order for him to enroll in an art academy. While Dobry excitedly begins to prepare for his new life, Neda worries that he will be leaving the village forever. However, he assures her that once he has completed his education, he will return to the village and marry her.

== Characters ==
Dobry - The protagonist of the novel, who first appears as a young farm boy. As he grows up throughout the story, he develops an increasingly impressive love and skill in art. He displays talent both in drawing and sculpting.

Neda - The daughter of the village shoe maker, and Dobry's lifelong best friend. They spend much of their free time together, and many of Dobry's artistic creations were made as gifts to her. Their friendship begins to blossom into romantic interest for one another as they grow older, and Dobry leaves the village with the promise that he will one day marry her.

Roda - Dobry's mother, whose husband died when Dobry was still a young child. Although other village men have been known to show interest in her, she insists that she will never remarry. She is completely dedicated to the family farm. Although she is a devoted mother, she is initially upset when Dobry begins to show more interest in art than taking over the fields. Eventually, she comes around, and gives Dobry the money needed to attend an art school.

Grandfather - Dobry's grandfather, who lives and works with them on the farm. He is renowned as a great story teller throughout the region, and often entertains others with his tales. Not only does he know a great number of Bulgarian folk tales, he displays a talent at inventing his own stories as well. It is largely due to this creative streak that he immediately supports Dobry in his artistic endeavors, and helps to convince Dobry's mother to let him explore his talents.

== Critical reception ==
Kirkus Reviews said of Dobry, "There's the real feel of the land in the story". Children's literature expert May Hill Arbuthnot calls it "One of the greatest children's books about people of other countries". She suggests that adults "Read it aloud, discuss and savor the colorful episodes." Twentieth-Century Children's Writers says the book is "inspiring", and that "the major characters in Dobry are strong and well-delineated". Dobry won the 1935 Newbery Medal.

Awards
Preceded by Invincible Louisa	Newbery Medal recipient 1935	Succeeded by Caddie Woodlawn
