= Atanas Katchamakoff =

Bulgarian-American sculptor and illustrator (1898-1988)

- Born: 18 January 1898; Lyaskovets, Bulgaria
- Died: December 22, 1988 (aged 90); Southern California, U.S.
- Education: National Art Academy, Sofia; postgraduate study in Rome
- Occupation: Sculptor · Woodcarver · Illustrator · Art educator
- Years active: 1920s–1980s
- Organizations: Palm Springs Art School (founder/teacher); El Paseo Art Gallery; Hollywood art studios
- Known for: Portrait sculpture, architectural reliefs, children’s book illustration; founder of Palm Springs Art School
- Notable work: Illustrated *Dobry* (1934 Newbery Medal‑winning book); sculptures for films Ben‑Hur, The King of Kings; Indian Woman with Papoose (prize‑winning marble)
- Spouse: Alexandra (Sasha) Katchamakoff

Atanas Katchamakoff (January 18, 1898 – December 22, 1988) was a Bulgarian-American sculptor, woodcarver, illustrator, and art educator. He founded the Palm Springs Art School, worked on Hollywood film productions, and illustrated Monica Shannon’s Dobry.

== Early life and education ==
Katchamakoff was born on January 18, 1898, in Lyaskovets, Bulgaria, He studied law and practiced briefly before enrolling at the National Art Academy in Sofia. He completed the five-year program in three years. His statue "Grief" won first prize at the International Sculpture Exhibition in Berlin, his first major success.

== Career ==
Early in his career, Katchamakoff won prizes at exhibitions in Vienna, Venice, and Rome, and later received commissions for an architectural sculpture in Germany. A permanent gallery of his works was established in Sofia, Bulgaria.

Katchamakoff moved to the United States in 1924 and worked as a production designer on Hollywood films including The King of Kings, Ben Hur, Helen of Troy, and Noah's Ark. He later returned to sculpture and portraiture.

In the late 1920s, Katchamakoff settled in Palm Springs, California, where he opened the El Paseo Art Gallery and founded the Palm Springs Art School in 1930. A 1931 Art Digest profile described the Palm Springs landscape as influencing Katchamakoff’s increasingly simplified sculptural forms. He created works such as "Prayer" and "Indian Woman with Papoose," the latter of which won first prize in a national competition conducted by the Art Alliance of America. During this time period he exhibited his art throughout the United States, including major exhibitions in San Francisco, New York, and Los Angeles.

In 1934, Katchamakoff illustrated Monica Shannon’s Dobry, which received the Newbery Medal. The novel concerns a Bulgarian boy who wants to become an artist. Scholars have noted parallels between episodes in the book and Katchamakoff’s childhood in Bulgaria.

== Artistic style ==
Critics sometimes connected Katchamakoff’s sculpture with his Bulgarian background. In a 1931 profile, Arthur Millier described aspects of his work in terms of monumental form and rural Bulgarian life. His career included exhibitions and accolades, such as prizes at the Sofia exhibitions in 1919 and 1920, Berlin in 1920, Venice in 1921, and the California State Fair in 1929. He also held solo exhibitions at the Stendahl Galleries in Los Angeles in 1931, the Delphic Studio in New York City in 1935, and the Carl Fischer Gallery in 1936.

During the years 1945-1958 Katchamakoff was inactive as a professional artist, focusing more on teaching. He continued to receive attention for his sculpture late in life, with contemporary sources discussing his portrait busts and figurative work.

== Personal life and death ==
Katchamakoff was married for many years to Alexandra (Sasha) Katchamakoff, a ceramic artist. He died on December 22, 1988.
