= Slaves Cottage =

Novel by George L. Howe

- Author: George L. Howe
- Language: English
- Genre: Family drama
- Publisher: Coward-McCann
- Publication date: 1935
- Media type: Print
- Pages: 345

Slaves Cottage is a 1935 novel by the American writer George L. Howe. It was the debut novel of Howe, and takes place in contemporary New England. Howe later went on to serve in the OSS and enjoyed great success with his novel Call It Treason in 1949.

== Synopsis ==
On the coast of New England the Vandeleur family are living in the cramped surroundings of the cottage once used to house slaves. They are descended from a noted eighteenth century slave trader but now shorts of funds are waiting for a large inheritance that they believe will change their fortunes. They retain a stand-offish attitude with the local villagers.

== Bibliography ==
- Johnson, Cynthia Mestad. James DeWolf and the Rhode Island Slave Trade. History Press, 2014.
- Purse, Lisa & Wölfel, Ute (ed.) Mediating War and Identity: Figures of Transgression in 20th- and 21st-century War Representation. Edinburgh University Press, 2020.
- Warfel, Harry Redcay. American Novelists of Today. American Book Company, 1951.
