= Owen Honors =

US Navy officer (born 1961)

Owen P. Honors Jr.
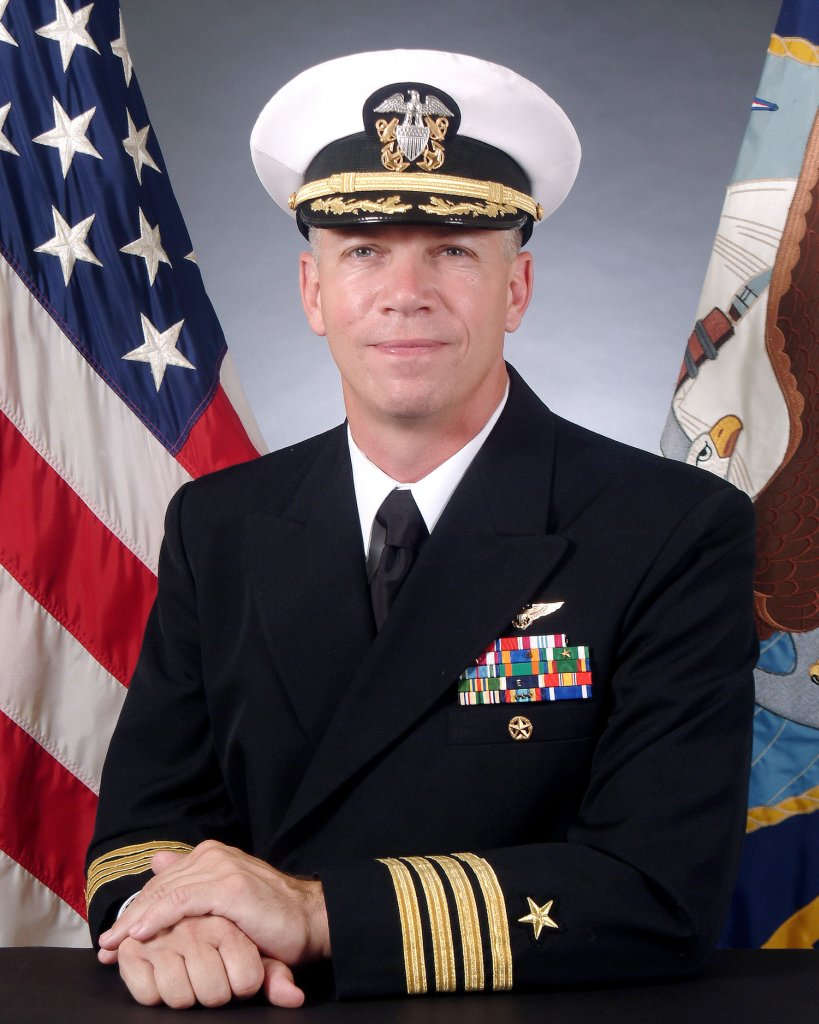
- Owen Paul Honors Jr., United States Navy
- Born: 1961 (age 64–65); Clay, New York
- Military career
- Allegiance: United States of America
- Branch: United States Navy
- Service years: 1983 – April 1, 2012
- Rank: Captain
- Commands: VF-211; USS Mount Whitney (LCC/JCC 20); USS Enterprise (CVN-65)
- Conflicts: Former Republic of Yugoslavia and Iraq (w/ VFA-41) Operation Enduring Freedom (w/ VF-211) Operation Assured Delivery (w/ LCC/JCC 20
- Awards: Legion of Merit; Bronze Star; Defense Meritorious Service Medal; Air Medal; Meritorious Service Medal

Owen Paul Honors Jr. (born 1961) is a retired United States Navy captain who served as commanding officer of the nuclear-powered aircraft carrier USS Enterprise before being relieved of his command due to videos he had made and shown aboard the same vessel while he was serving as executive officer.

== Early life and education ==
Honors, the son of Owen Paul Honors Sr., was born and raised in Clay, New York. He graduated from Cicero High School in 1979. In 1983, Honors graduated with a B.S. degree in Aerospace Engineering from the U.S. Naval Academy. He then went on to obtain a master of arts degree in national security and strategic studies from the Naval War College in Newport, Rhode Island.

== Military career ==
Designated a naval aviator in September 1985, Honors completed initial F-14 training with the "Grim Reapers" of VF-101. Honors was then assigned to the "Be-Devilers" of VF-74, and deployed aboard USS Saratoga (CV-60) to the Mediterranean Sea. During this tour, he attended U.S. Naval Fighter Weapons School (Top Gun) and was selected to attend U.S. Naval Test Pilot School, graduating in 1990. His tour was completed at the Strike Aircraft Test Directorate in Patuxent River, Maryland, in the carrier suitability department.

On 4 June 1992, Owens suffered minor injuries when his T-45A Goshawk training jet skidded off the runway. He delayed ejecting until he could prevent a collision with a nearby occupied van.

In April 1993, Honors joined the "Black Aces" of VF-41 for his department head tour deploying on board USS Theodore Roosevelt. While attached to VF-41, he served as both Operations and Maintenance Officer conducting combat operations in the former Republic of Yugoslavia and Iraq.

Following his master's degree from Naval War College in September 1996, he reported to U.S. Atlantic Command for joint duty as the Joint Reconnaissance Center Branch Head. During this tour, Honors was selected for aviation command.

In October 1999, Honors reported to the "Fighting Checkmates" of VF-211, deploying on board USS John C. Stennis. Honors assumed command of the "Checkmates" in February 2001. While attached to the "Checkmates," he deployed twice to the Western Pacific/Persian Gulf. His second deployment was on short notice in support of Operation Enduring Freedom soon after the events of 9/11.

Honors reported to the Bureau of Personnel (BUPERS) as the head junior officer detailer in May 2002. He was selected for carrier executive officer in October 2002 and departed BUPERS in October 2003 to begin Aviation Nuclear Officer training. He reported as Executive Officer of USS Enterprise in July 2005, deploying twice prior to departing in September 2007.

In January 2008, Honors assumed command of the U.S. Sixth Fleet Command Ship, USS Mount Whitney homeported in Gaeta, Italy. In September 2008 Honors commanded USS Mount Whitney during Operation Assured Delivery as the ship supported humanitarian assistance missions in the Republic of Georgia during its armed conflict with Russia. Honors was quoted as saying that the mission was, "...not a show of force—it's a show of solidarity."

He has 3,400 flight hours in 31 types of aircraft with more than 700 landings on 15 carriers. He has flown 85 combat missions in three different theaters.

On 6 May 2010, Honors was appointed the 21st commander of USS Enterprise. Replacing Capt. Ron Horton, he was scheduled to be the last commanding officer of the ship before it is decommissioned. On 4 January 2011, he was relieved of this command.

=== Controversial videos ===
On 3 January 2011, Honors was under investigation for videos he produced, one set entitled "XO Movie Night", filmed on USS Enterprise, and aired via closed circuit television on select Saturday evenings, while he was Executive Officer of Enterprise. Three complete videos, produced for distribution over the ship's closed circuit video system, have been released by The Virginian-Pilot. One video shows two male Navy sailors standing in a shower stall pretending to wash each other, and two female sailors pretending to shower together to conserve water; sailors parading in drag; and homophobic slurs. There are scenes of simulated masturbation and a simulated rectal exam.

The videos were shown on board in 2006 and 2007.

The Navy's official statement is that when officers higher in the chain of command became aware of Honors' videos in 2007, he was instructed to cease their production but no further action was taken. Honors disputes this, claiming that his superiors actively or tacitly approved of the videos and never instructed him to stop.

On 4 January 2011, as related in the New York Times:

Adm. John C. Harvey Jr., the commander of U.S. Fleet Forces Command in Norfolk, said in a statement released Tuesday afternoon that Captain Honors was removed for demonstrating poor judgment. "The responsibility of the commanding officer for his or her command is absolute," Admiral Harvey said in the statement. " While Captain Honors' performance as commanding officer of U.S.S. Enterprise has been without incident, his profound lack of good judgment and professionalism while previously serving as executive officer on Enterprise calls into question his character and completely undermines his credibility to continue to serve effectively in command."

Admiral Harvey also said in the statement that after viewing the videos, he had lost confidence in Captain Honors' ability to lead effectively.

Honors was reassigned to an administrative role. The admiral said the Navy continued to investigate the case of the videos from 2006 and 2007 and would look into what other officers aboard USS Enterprise knew about them.

In a written statement obtained and published by Military Times on January 28, Honors stated that his superior officers were aware of the videos and did not instruct him to stop their production. Honors' superiors included Larry Rice, Ron Horton (both now rear admirals), Rear Admiral Raymond Spicer (since retired), Rear Admiral Richard O'Hanlon, and Vice Admiral Daniel Holloway.

The Navy's investigation was completed on 4 February 2011. Harvey recommended that letters of censure be issued to Honors, Captain John Dixon, who was XO of Enterprise from September 2007 to June 2009, Rice, and Horton. Non-punitive letters of caution were issued to Spicer and Holloway. Rear Admirals Gregory Nosal and Clifford Sharpe were counseled. Thirty-two other sailors and officers also received non-punitive letters of caution. Horton was removed as commander of the Navy's logistics group in Singapore.

On 18 March 2011, it was announced that Secretary of the Navy Ray Mabus followed Harvey's recommendations and issued the letters of censure to Honors, Dixon, Rice and Horton. It was widely agreed that the letter effectively ended Honors' career, as further promotion was effectively impossible.

On 24 August 2011, a three-admiral board of inquiry formally reprimanded Honors over the videos, stating that Honors "committed misconduct, failed to demonstrate acceptable qualities of leadership required of an officer in his grade and failed to conform to prescribed standards of military deportment." The board, however, voted 3-0 to retain Honors in the Navy.

On April 1, 2012, Honors retired from the U.S. Navy. He now works for Check Six Inc. out of Baltimore, Maryland, providing "leadership and safety training for the oil industry focusing on high reliability operations in hazardous environments around the globe."

== Awards and honors ==
Honors is the recipient of the following awards:

- Legion of Merit
- Bronze Star
- Defense Meritorious Service Medal
- Multiple Air Medals
- Meritorious Service Medal
- Various campaign/unit awards
