= Decision Before Dawn =

1951 film by Anatole Litvak

- Theatrical release poster
- Directed by: Anatole Litvak
- Screenplay by: Peter Viertel
- Based on: Call It Treason; 1949 novel by George Howe
- Produced by: Anatole Litvak; Frank McCarthy
- Starring: Richard Basehart; Gary Merrill; Oskar Werner; Hildegard Knef
- Narrated by: Richard Basehart
- Cinematography: Franz Planer
- Edited by: Dorothy Spencer
- Music by: Franz Waxman
- Distributed by: 20th Century-Fox
- Release dates: August 30, 1951 (London); November 1, 1951 (U.S.); December 21, 1951 (New York/Los Angeles)
- Running time: 119 minutes
- Country: United States
- Language: English
- Box office: $1.55 million (US rentals)

Decision Before Dawn is a 1951 American spy war film directed by Anatole Litvak and starring Richard Basehart, Oskar Werner and Hans Christian Blech. It tells the story of the U.S. Army using potentially unreliable German prisoners of war to gather intelligence as clandestine "line-crossers" in the closing days of World War II. The film was adapted by Peter Viertel and Jack Rollens (uncredited) from the novel Call It Treason by George L. Howe. Decision Before Dawn was a critical success and was nominated for the Academy Award for Best Picture.

== Plot ==
By late 1944, as the Allies march toward the Rhine, it is obvious that Germany will lose the war. American Colonel Devlin leads a military intelligence unit that enlists German POWs to cross into German territory and spy on their former comrades. The recruits include "Tiger", a cynical mercenary, and "Happy", a young, idealistic medical student. Monique, a former resistance operative, trains Happy and others in espionage techniques.

Devlin learns that a Wehrmacht general wants to negotiate the surrender of his entire command, and a mission is organized. Devlin selects Lieutenant Rennick to lead it, who Rennick hates turncoats on both sides of the war. Both Tiger and Happy are chosen for the mission: Tiger knows the area well, and Happy is tasked with locating the XI Panzer Corps, which might oppose any mass surrender. The three men parachute into Germany and then separate.

During his search for the XI Panzer, Happy encounters Germans with differing attitudes about the war. On buses and trains, in guest houses and taverns, he meets those who are still defiant, such as SS courier Scholtz, and those who are now resigned to defeat, such as Hilde, a war widow turned prostitute. Eventually, Happy locates the XI Panzer, posing as a medic. He is selected to treat its ailing commander, Oberst von Ecker, at his castle headquarters. Happy narrowly escapes capture by the Gestapo. He finds a safe house in the ruins of heavily bombed Mannheim, where Rennick and Tiger hide as well. They have learned that the German commander whom they were to contact has been injured and hospitalized under SS guard. Without him, the other German officers cannot and will not surrender to the Allies.

Happy, Tiger and Rennick reach the banks of the Rhine, where they plan to swim across to American lines. At the last moment, Tiger loses his nerve and flees, forcing Rennick to kill him to preserve the mission. As Rennick and Happy are about to swim for the opposite shore, they are spotted. Facing torture and execution if caught, Happy draws the Germans' attention away from Rennick by surrendering. His sacrifice enables the lieutenant to reach safety. Rennick survives, with a changed attitude about some Germans.

== Cast ==
- Oskar Werner as Corporal Karl Maurer ("Happy")
- Richard Basehart as Lieutenant Dick Rennick
- Hans Christian Blech as Sergeant Rudolf Barth ("Tiger")
- Gary Merrill as Colonel Devlin
- Hildegard Knef as Hilde
- Wilfried Seyferth as Heinz Scholtz
- Dominique Blanchar as Monique
- O.E. Hasse as Oberst (Colonel) von Ecker
- Helene Thimig as Paula Schneider

== Production ==
The film was adapted from the novel Call It Treason, which was based on the wartime experiences of author George L. Howe, who served with the Office of Strategic Services unit attached to the Seventh Army during World War II.

The citizens of Würzburg, Nuremberg and Mannheim, where some of the picture's battle scenes were shot, were forewarned of the filming by newspaper and radio announcements. Some were under the control by the American military, as Germany was still under military occupation at the time when the film was shot.

== Release ==
Decision Before Dawn premiered at the Odeon Marble Arch in London on August 30, 1951. It opened in select American markets on November 1, 1951.

A press preview of the film was held at the Fox Ritz Theatre in Los Angeles on December 19, 1951, with many Hollywood stars in attendance. The film began its general release in the area two days later.

== Reception ==
In a contemporary review for The New York Times, critic Bosley Crowther called the film "as stirring a drama as any you'll want to see, as well as a fair approximation of a nation's moral collapse" and wrote:

Within the inflexible framework of a straight undercover spy film, which in this case goes by the title of "Decision Before Dawn," Twentieth Century-Fox and Anatole Litvak have packed not only lots of thrills but a clear and cold look at Western Germany in the last year of World War II. They have also worked into this thriller ... a persuasive amount of compassion for . a German soldier who turns traitor on his own. ... True, there's nothing morally elaborate or conclusive about "Decision Before Dawn." But it packs some impulsive excitement and it plants a seed of understanding in the mind."

Critic Philip K. Scheuer of the Los Angeles Times wrote:

Although it is unconscionably long—two hours—the picture, once it begins to make any kind of sustained narrative sense, tightens its hold steadily on the spectator and adds up at last to tiptop melodrama. The most impressive thing about it is the way Litvak seems to have got what he wanted in divided Germany. He has practically restaged the mass bombings and relighted the ruins. It is as a possible social document that "Decision Before Dawn" falls down. "Why does a spy risk his life—for what possible reason?" the narrator asks portentously at the beginning. He never answers it; Litvak and his actors don't either, except superficially.

Upon viewing the film, Five star American general Douglas MacArthur said: "This is the finest picture I have seen this year, and I nominate it for an Academy Award."

== Recognition ==
The picture received two nominations at the 24th Academy Awards: for Best Picture, and Best Film Editing (for the work of Dorothy Spencer).
