= Yevgeny Titarenko =

Russian writer (1935–2018)

- Born: 5 December 1935; West Siberian Krai, Russian SSR, Soviet Union
- Died: 28 April 2018 (aged 82); Voronezh, Russia
- Writing career
- Genre: children's literature

Yevgeny Maximovich Titarenko (Russian: Евгений Максимович Титаренко; December 5, 1935 – April 28, 2018) was a Russian writer and the brother of Raisa Gorbacheva.

== Biography ==
Titarenko was born on December 5, 1935, in the village of Yar Funny West Siberian Krai (now the Rubtsovsk district of the Altai Territory) into the family of Maxim Andreyevich and Alexandra Petrovna. He was the brother of Mikhail Gorbachev's wife Raisa Titarenko (Raisa Gorbacheva).

After a seven-year course he graduated from the Leningrad Naval Preparatory School, then he studied at the Leningrad Higher Naval School of Engineers of weapons but did not graduate. Demoted to the rank of sailor he served in the North, in the Arctic. Then he moved to the Donbas, where he worked in the mines.

He graduated from the Maxim Gorky Literature Institute. According to the distribution in 1965, he arrived in Voronezh.

He worked as an editor of fiction in the Central Black Earth publishing house. He first offered to publish the novel Landslide which was, according to the potential publishers, weak and thus did not see the light of day. Instead Titarenko had published an adventure story for teenagers, Discoveries, Wars, Wanderings of the Admiral-Generalissimo and his Сhief of Staff on Water, on Earth and under Earth. He immediately drew the attention of readers and critics to the young author. His other novels Four to the Мarket Рlace, Miner, Nikodimov Lake, On a Small Рiece of The Universe were published in Moscow and Voronezh and achieved mass circulation.

He was married to the Ossetian poet Zoya Gaboeva and together they have a daughter, Irina. After their divorce, Titarenko thought to create a new family, but all his attempts ended in failure. According to one version, none of the women he pursued could accept the way of life of the writer. On the other hand, the security services deliberately guided of all the ladies away from his Gorbacheva's brother.

Titarenko suffered from chronic alcoholism. Every year, his condition only worsened. Around 1989 Titarenko finally moved to the hospital. The official diagnosis was organic brain damage, Alzheimer's disease. Initially, the writer settled into very good conditions in a private room with a refrigerator. He was visited by comrades from his literary workshop, but he gradually ceased to receive visitors in the hospital. Gorbacheva herself as her husband was high up in the national government, never visited him there. However, she related in her memoirs... My brother was a gifted, talented person. But his talents did not come true. His talent has appeared unclaimed and ruined. Brother and drink for many months spent in the hospital. His fate a drama of mother and father. It is my constant pain that I carry in my heart for more than 30 years. I worry about his bitter tragedy, especially as a child we were very close, has always been between us a special emotional connection and attachment... is hard and painful. Titarenko spent more than thirty years in a psychiatric hospital near the village of Orlovka (Voronezh Oblast).

== Death ==
Yevgeny Titarenko died on 28 April 2018 at the age of 82, following a long illness.

== Bibliography ==
- Miner (Voronezh, 1968)
- Nikodimov Lake (Moscow, 1973)
- Nikodimov Lake (Voronezh, 1974)
- Inventing Тenderness (Voronezh, 1977)
- The Сritical Тemperature (Voronezh, 1978)
- On a Small Рiece of The Universe (Moscow, 1982)
- Four to the Мarket Рlace (Voronezh, 1983)
- On a Small Рiece of The Universe (Voronezh, 1985)
