= Monica Shannon =

American writer

- Born: March 7, 1893; Belleville, Ontario, Canada
- Died: August 13, 1965 (aged 72); Los Angeles, California
- Education: BS Library Science
- Occupations: Writer, librarian
- Spouse: Elbert Wing (m. 1925)
- Writing career
- Period: 1925–1960
- Genre: Children's literature
- Notable work: Dobry
- Notable awards: Newbery Medal; 1935

Monica G. Shannon Wing (March 7, 1893 – August 13, 1965) was a Canadian-born American children's author. Her book Dobry, published in 1934, received the Newbery Medal in 1935.

== Biography ==
Shannon was born in Canada to Irish immigrants Patrick and Eliza Keena Shannon, but moved to the United States before her first birthday. They lived in Seattle first before settling in Montana's Bitter Root Valley, where she grew up on the ranches her father supervised. The stories told by her father's Bulgarian ranch-hands influenced her writing, as did her love for nature. Even as a child Shannon's writing reflected her love for nature and the shepherds on her family's ranch. For one elementary school assignment to write about her favorite Bible character, Shannon chose Joseph of the Old Testament, who was a shepherd as a young boy. The story so impressed her teacher that Shannon won a special award for it.

Shannon moved to California and worked at the Los Angeles Public Library from 1915 to 1925, and later lived at Three Rivers, California. While working at the Los Angeles Public Library she was in charge of publicity for three successful library bond campaigns, in 1921, 1923, and 1925.

Shannon's first book, California Fairy Tales, was published by Doubleday in 1926. It includes stories from the US, Spain, and Ireland, as well as California plants and animals. Dobry was published in 1934. It tells the story of a young peasant boy who longs to be a sculptor. Dobry's father is dead, and his mother wants him to work the land. His grandfather, however, supports his dream and encourages him to follow his dreams. Some of Dobry's experiences come from the life of Atanas Katchamakoff, the Bulgarian-born sculptor who illustrated the book.

Monica Shannon, who married Elbert Wing in Santa Barbara in 1925, died August 13, 1965.

== Awards ==
Dobry won the 1935 Newbery Medal for the "most distinguished contribution to American literature for children".

== Works ==
- California in Print (Los Angeles Public Library, 1919)
- California Fairy Tales (Doubleday, 1926), illustrated by C. E. Millard
- Eyes for the Dark (Doubleday, 1928), illus. Millard, reissued as More Stories from California (1935)
- Goose Grass Rhymes (Doubleday, 1930), illus. Neva Kanaga Brown
- Tawnymore (Doubleday, 1931), illus. Jean Charlot
- Dobry (Viking, 1934), illus. Atanas Katchamakoff
