= The Great Divide (novel) =

1935 novel by Alan Sullivan

- Author: Alan Sullivan
- Language: English
- Genre: Historical
- Publication date: 1935
- Publication place: Canada
- Media type: Print

The Great Divide is a historical novel by the Canadian writer Alan Sullivan, which was first published in 1935. It was a breakthrough work for Sullivan and was very well received by critics. It depicts the construction of the Canadian Pacific Railway in the nineteenth century.

== Film adaptation ==
In 1937 the novel was adapted into a British film The Great Barrier, directed by Milton Rosmer and Geoffrey Barkas at the Lime Grove Studios in London. A number of changes were made from the novel.

== Bibliography ==
- McLeod, Gordon Duncan. Essentially Canadian: The Life and Fiction of Alan Sullivan, 1868-1947. Wilfrid Laurier University Press, 1982.
