= George L. Howe =

American architect

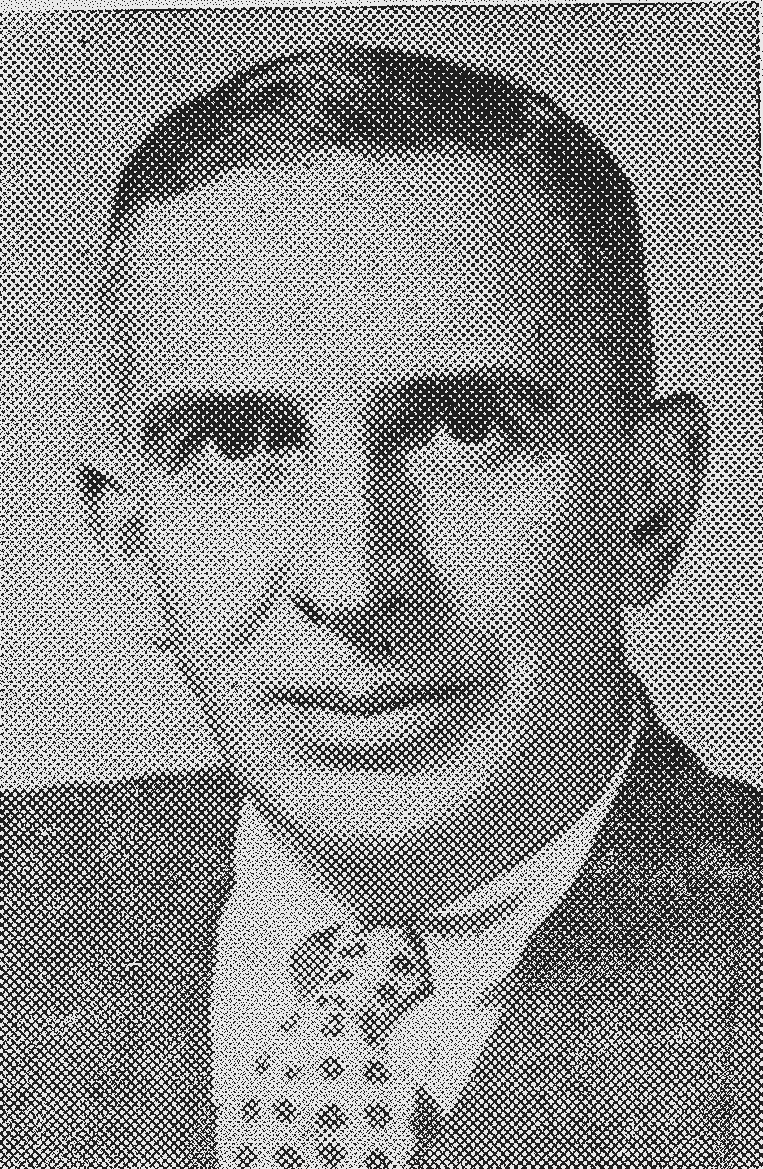
Howe in the early 1950s

George Locke Howe (April 19, 1898 – June 19, 1977) was an author, architect, and Office of Strategic Services officer in World War II. His experiences in the OSS were the basis of his novel Call It Treason, which was adapted as the 1951 Oscar-nominated film Decision Before Dawn, which received a nomination for Best Picture.

== Early life and education ==
Howe was born in Bristol, Rhode Island, the son of Mary Locke and Wallis Eastburn Howe, a prominent architect. He was a member of a Boston literary family that included Mark A. DeWolfe, Helen Howe and Quincy Howe. Howe graduated from Harvard College in 1918 and then graduated in 1925 from Harvard Architectural School with a Master's Degree in Architecture.

He served with the U.S. Navy during World War I, enlisting as a Hospital Apprentice in 1917 and serving in Queenstown, Ireland and on the USS Plattsburg. He was discharged in 1919 and rose to the rank of Yeoman Second Class.

== Career ==
=== Architecture ===
Howe earned a master's in architecture in 1925 and practiced with his father in Providence, Rhode Island.

He moved to Washington, D.C., in the 1930s where he worked with the Public Buildings Administration. He entered private practice with a series of partners from 1940 to the early 1960s, becoming a prominent architect in the capital. During his architectural career, he supervised the design and construction of more than 600 buildings.

=== Office of Strategic Services ===
During the war, Howe served with the Office of Strategic Services (O.S.S.), the precursor of the Central Intelligence Agency. He served with an O.S.S. detachment of G-2, military intelligence, in the U.S. Seventh Army in Algeria, France and Germany. He held the rank of lieutenant colonel.

Howe provided documents and cover stories for German soldier POWs recruited to re-enter the Reich in the last months of the war to collect intelligence. According to writer Joseph E. Persico, the "handsome and urbane architect of middle age ... seemed to take a childlike delight in this late-blooming career in professional deception." There was nothing childlike in the missions the German soldier-recruits undertook, however. They "confronted German land mines and machine-gun nests on the way out and American defenses on the way back." They also faced detection and execution in Germany.

In recognition of his wartime service, Howe was awarded the Medal of Freedom by President Harry S. Truman. The War Department announced in June 1946 that Howe was bestowed the award for "extraordinary service" with the armed forces as a civilian between March 1944 and May 1945.

=== Literary career and Call It Treason ===
Howe authored articles that appeared in American Heritage, and poems and translations that appeared in The New Yorker, Atlantic Monthly and Harper's.

In 1935 he wrote his first novel Slaves Cottage, published by Coward-McCann. The book is set in the fictional New England seacost village of Hope, focusing on its most prominent family, which made its fortune in the slave trade. The New York Times review said that Howe writes with a "romanticism that recalls Hawthorne." but that his restrained prose "lacks adequate sympathy for the emotions described." The Los Angeles Times called it "an earnest but dull story."

His 1949 novel Call It Treason, published by Viking Press, focuses on three German soldiers who agree to work for the U.S. Army against their country. They are known in Army parlance as "agents," "Joes" and "bodies." One, code-named "Tiger," is a Communist who is greedy for power and wealth, the second, code-named "Paluka," is an adventure-seeking daredevil, and the third is an idealistic young medical student from Berlin, code-named "Happy." They are recruited by intelligence officers of the Seventh Army to be dropped behind the lines to gather intelligence.

The novel traces their journey to return, with Happy as the primary focus of the novel. Happy is ordered to locate two German divisions for Army cartographers. The article explores the motives that brings these three men to commit treason, with Happy's journey through Ulm and Heidelberg to the Rhine at Mannheim is the principal narrative thread of the book. A New York Times reviewer called the book "not primarily a novel at all," that "the plot is necessarily set and stereotyped," and that its principal interest was its description of life in Germany during the war.

The novel was based on Howe's experiences as an OSS officer. The book won a $15,000 first prize award in a contest by the Christophers, "an organization devoted to bringing Christian principles into everyday life."

Howe dedicated the book "To Happy 1925-45." In a foreword to the novel, the author reprinted a sorrowful 1947 letter he had received from Happy's father seeking information about his son's fate. At the book's end, the author recounts that he had responded to the original letter from Happy's father, telling him what had happened to his son. The novel ends with a second letter from the father, noting that both he and his wife were grateful to Howe "for having seen as deep into our boy's heart as only we had seen."

Howe wrote the novel while spending six months in the hospital recovering from serious injuries in a car accident. He was in traction and had to dictate the text of the novel into a machine.

The novel was translated into seven languages and was published in eight countries. It was adapted into a 1951 film, Decision Before Dawn, starring Oskar Werner as Happy and featuring Richard Basehart and Gary Merrill as U.S. intelligence officers.

Howe was also author of the 1953 novel The Heart Alone and the 1959 novel Mt. Hope; A New England Chronicle, published by Viking Press. The book is a historical novel set in Bristol, Rhode Island, and is largely a chronicle of members of the Howe family. A New York Times review called it a "tongue-in-cheek record of buccaneering skullduggery."

== Personal life and death ==
In his Boston Globe obituary, Howe was described as a "tall, lean, dark-eyed, patrician-looking man."

Howe was married to Elisabeth W. Parker. They had a son and three daughters. He retired in 1968 and lived at a farm in Culpeper, Virginia, where he raised and boarded thoroughbred horses. He died at 79 on June 19, 1977, after surgery at a Veterans Administration Hospital in Salem, Virginia.
