= Call It Treason =

Novel by George L. Howe

Call it Treason
- Author: George L. Howe
- Language: English
- Genre: Thriller
- Publisher: Viking Press
- Publication date: 1949
- Media type: Print

Call it Treason is a 1949 war thriller novel by the American writer George L. Howe. The author had been active in the Office of Strategic Services during World War II and the novel is a fictionalized account of his work on an operation of sending German prisoners of war back into the Third Reich to spy for the Allies. Howe was awarded the Christopher Prize for the novel, worth $15,000. In 1951 the novel was adapted into the 20th Century Fox film Decision Before Dawn directed by Anatole Litvak and starring Oskar Werner and Hildegard Knef. The title is a reference to the famous rhyming observation by the English Elizabethan era poet John Harington that "treason never prospers". In 1953 it was translated into German.

== Bibliography ==
- Goble, Alan. The Complete Index to Literary Sources in Film. Walter de Gruyter, 1999.
- Purse, Lisa & Wölfel, Ute (ed.) Mediating War and Identity: Figures of Transgression in 20th- and 21st-century War Representation. Edinburgh University Press, 2020.
