= Alan Sullivan =

Canadian poet and author (1868–1947)

Edward Alan Sullivan
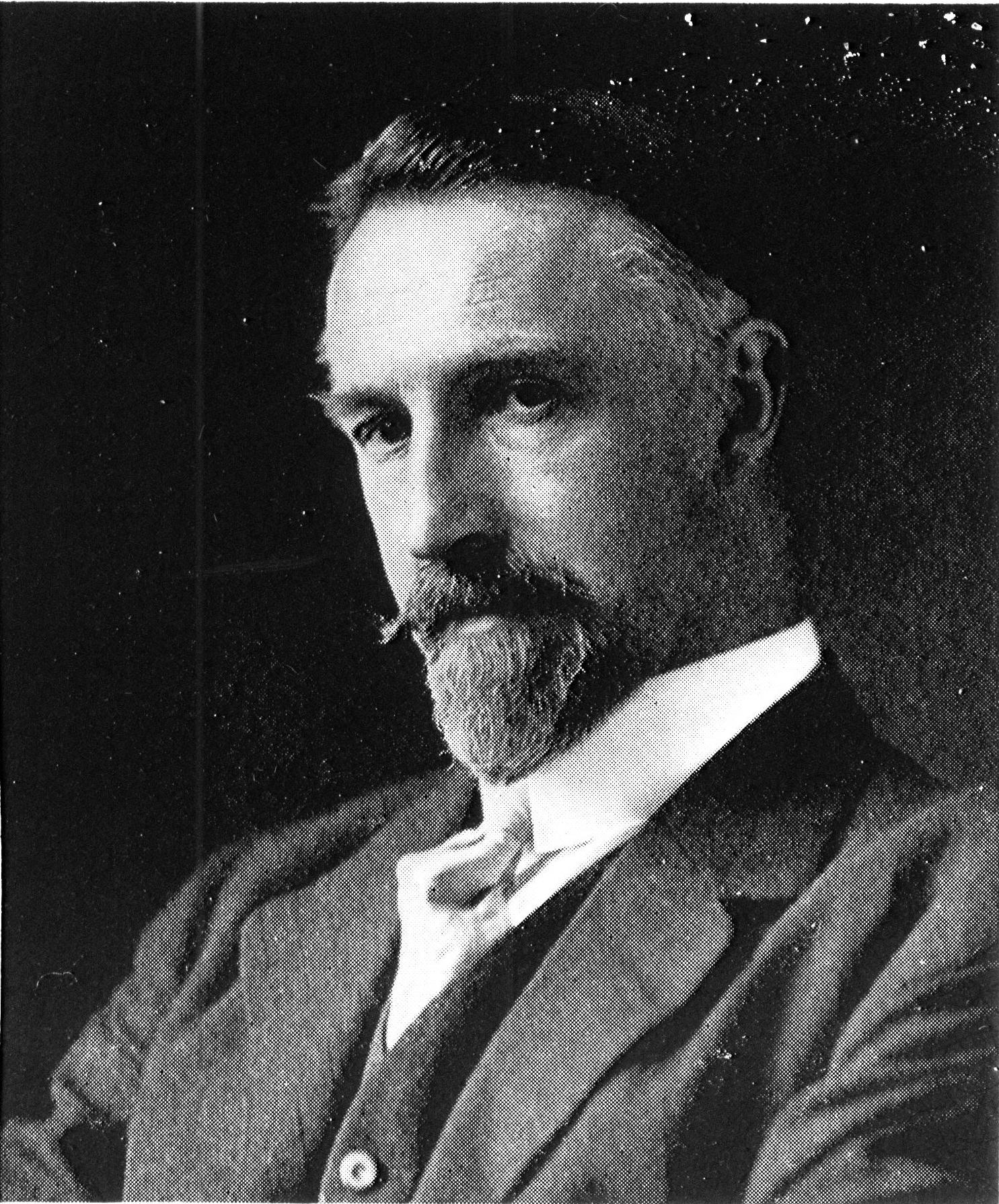
- Born: November 29, 1868; St. George's Rectory, Montreal, Canada
- Died: August 6, 1947 (aged 78)
- Occupations: Poet, Writer
- Writing career
- Notable works: The Great Divide, Three Came to Ville Marie

Edward Alan Sullivan (November 29, 1868 — August 6, 1947) was a Canadian poet and author of short stories. He is noted for his 1935 historical adventure novel The Great Divide, which depicts the construction of the Canadian Pacific Railway.

== History ==
Born in St. George's Rectory, Montreal, he was the oldest son of Edward Sullivan and Frances Mary Renaud. In 1869, his father became rector of Trinity Church, Chicago. The family lived to the city in 1871, and thus witnessed the Great Chicago Fire. When he was 15, he began attending Loretto in Musselburgh, Scotland, a famous school for boys.

On his return to Canada, he attended the School of Practical Science, Toronto. After this he did railway exploration work in the West, and later worked in mining. He was assistant engineer in the Clergue enterprises at Sault Ste. Marie, Ontario for a year and a half, before the organization of the Consolidated Lake Superior Company. Subsequently, he spent several years as a mining engineer in the Lake of the Woods district during the period of its gold exploitation.

== Writing ==
He gained recognition in the United States through his poems, short stories and comprehensive articles on various themes. These frequently appeared in Harper's Magazine, the Atlantic Monthly, and other leading American periodicals. In 1941 he won the Governor General's Award for English-language fiction for the novel Three Came to Ville Marie. Wonder Stories reviewed his lost race novel In the Beginning favorably, saying its depiction of an encounter between modern men and Pleistocene-era tribesmen was a "most tremendous drama of inter-racial conflict".

== Selected bibliography ==
- The Passing of Oul-i-but (1913)
- Blantyre — Alien (1914)
- The Inner Door (1917)
- Aviation in Canada, 1917-18 (1919)
- The Rapids (1920)
- The Crucible (1925)
- The Jade God (1925)
- Human Clay (1926; as Sinclair Murray)
- In the Beginning (1926; as Sinclair Murray)
- The Splendid Silence (1927)
- Whispering Lodge (1927)
- Under the Northern Lights (1928) Short Story collection:
  - Trade
  - The Eyes of Sebastien
  - The Spirit of the North
  - The Circuit of the Wild Swan
  - The Blindness of Pituluk
  - Motherhood
  - The Magic of Kahdoosh
  - The Reward of Kwasind
  - The Loyalty of Peeguk
  - The Passing of Chantie, the Curlew
  - The Affair of Kalauk, the Skilful Hunter
  - The Salving of Pyack
- A Little Way Ahead (1930; as Sinclair Murray)
- The Magic Makers (1930)
- The Golden Foundling (1931)
- The Great Divide (1935)
- With Love from Rachel (1938)
- Three Came to Ville Marie (1941)
- Cariboo Road (1946)
