= Monterey History and Art Association =

Nonprofit in Monterey, California

- Current properties Former properties Other historic sites preserved or supported by MHAA
- Formation: 1930
- Established: January 13, 1931
- Founded at: Cademartori's Restaurant, Spaghetti Hill
- Type: Nonprofit organization
- Headquarters: Old Downtown Monterey, Monterey, California

The Monterey History and Art Association (MHA) is a nonprofit organization established in 1931 in Monterey, California dedicated to historical preservation and the arts in the Monterey Peninsula. MHA owns and operates several history museums, including the Stanton Center, Casa Serrano, and the Mayo Hayes O'Donnell Library. It is the oldest nonprofit organization in Monterey. Through the years, it has worked with the City of Monterey, California State Parks, the National Trust for Historic Preservation, and other regional organizations to rescue, salvage, and dedicate dozens of sites in the area. MHA is also directly responsible for implementing Monterey's "path of history."

== History ==
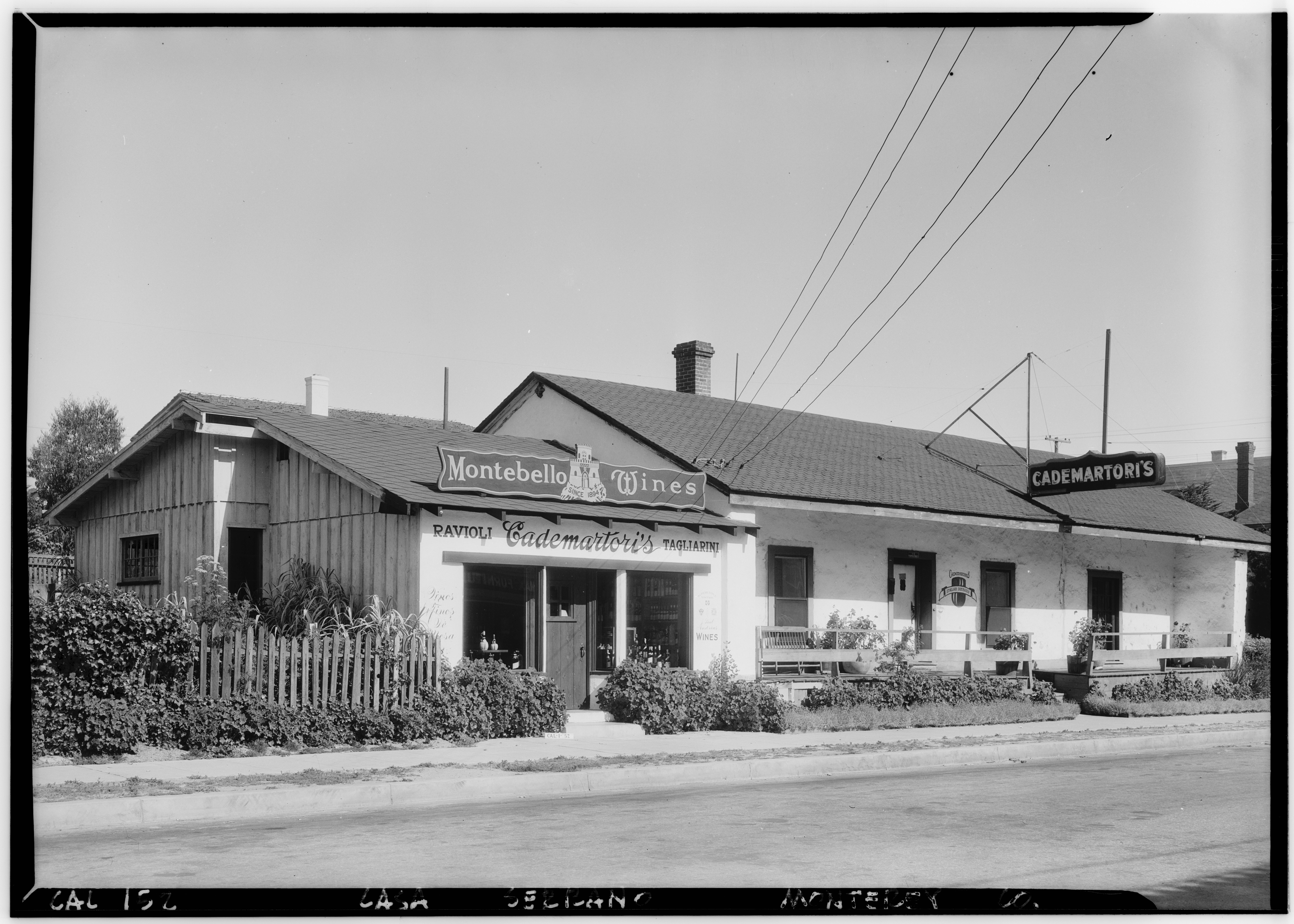
MHA was created over dinner at Cademartori's Restaurant in Spaghetti Hill.

In 1930, a small group of Monterey Peninsulans gathered at Cademartori's Restaurant (Casa Serrano). Here, this group planned the foundations of the organization that became the Monterey History and Art Association (MHA). The group was officially incorporated on January 13, 1931 under California law, with the stated purpose: "...to preserve the significant reminders of California, and particularly the artifacts of Monterey's historic and colorful past." The first President of MHA was Roger S. Fitch (former Rough Rider), Vice-President was Carmel Martin (former Mayor of Monterey), and the Secretary was Eastern R. Gibson. Among the members of the founding directors were E. Charlton Fortune and Gouverneur Morris.

By the end of their first year of operation, the MHA rescued the First Theater in cooperation with the California Department of Parks and Recreation.

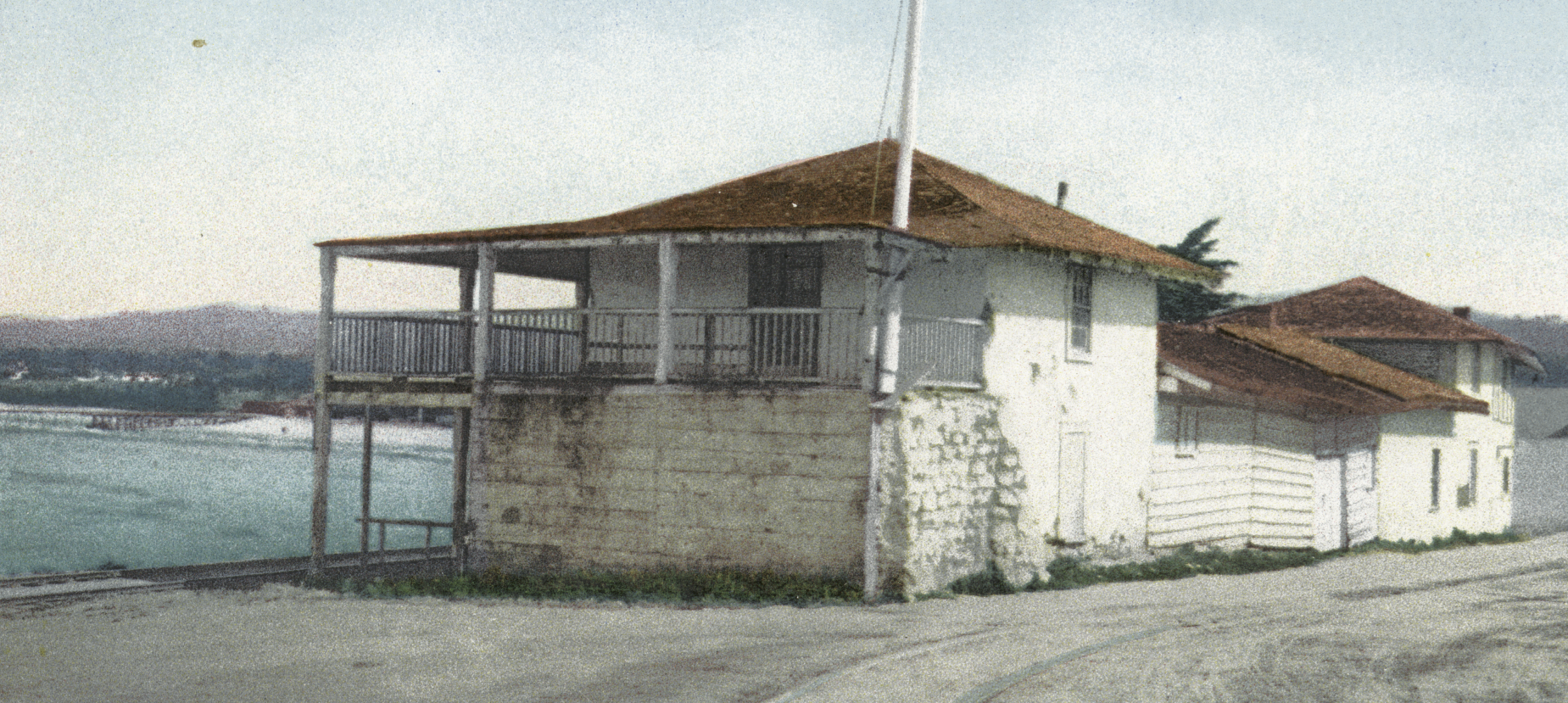
The Old Custom House was the first building "saved" by the MHA from demolition.

In 1938, the government of the United States declared that the Old Custom House was government surplus. This building, the first-ever government building in the state, and where the United States had raised its flag over California for the first time, was important to the members of MHA. When a local restaurateur offered to turn it into a restaurant, Allen Griffin ran a series of editorials in his newspaper, the Monterey Peninsula Herald, lambasting the notion. Griffin and several other members of the MHA volunteered their war bonuses to save the building. Frank E. Booth, owner of the F. E. Booth Cannery, donated a blank check. Through their efforts, the building was donated to the State of California to preserve the state's founding legacy.

Warren J. Clear, while walking along the beach, discovered a potential copy of a land claim made by Francis Drake to California in 1579 as a message in a bottle. Myron Oliver, a local antiques dealer and member of MHA, attempted to unfurl the document to verify its authenticity in 1949. He could not, and neither could the British Museum, stating that it would have been impossible to unroll it. Nevertheless, Allen Griffin offered Clear a substantial amount of money for the scroll, but Clear refused to part with it. Later, Clear claimed that the document had been stolen.

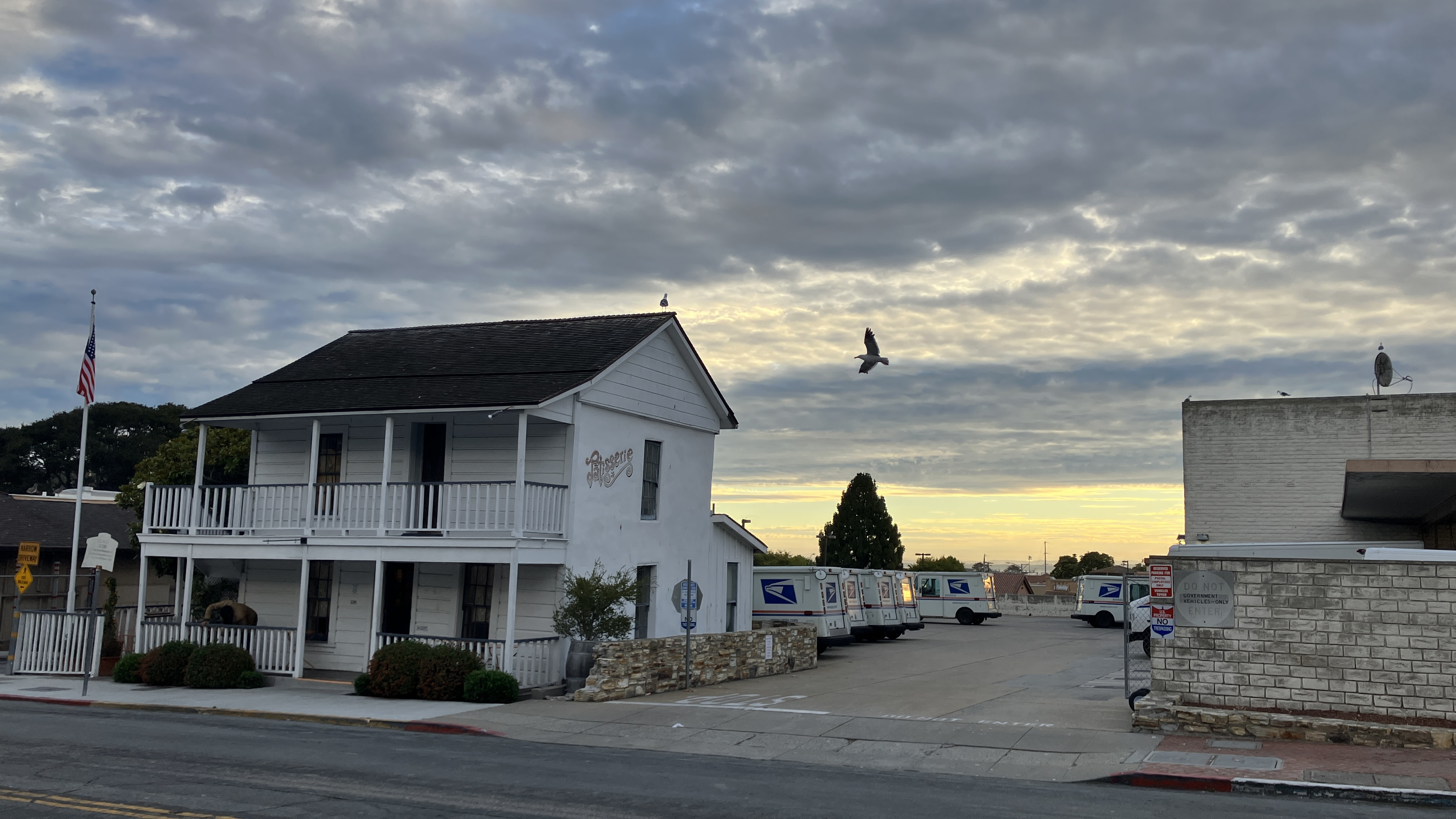
Fremont Headquarters is seen on the left, next to the Post Office parking lot. Today, it is occupied by a bakery.

In 1961, MHA learned that Fremont Headquarters (today a bakery) was scheduled to be demolished in order to expand the Monterey Post Office. Griffin worked with the federal government, the City, and the Monterey Foundation to halt the development. In September 1961, MHA President Allen Griffin announced that the $9,500 price was met, and the MHA now owned their second-ever historic building, after Casa Serrano. For many years, Fremont Headquarters acted as the offices of MHA.

== Stanton Center ==
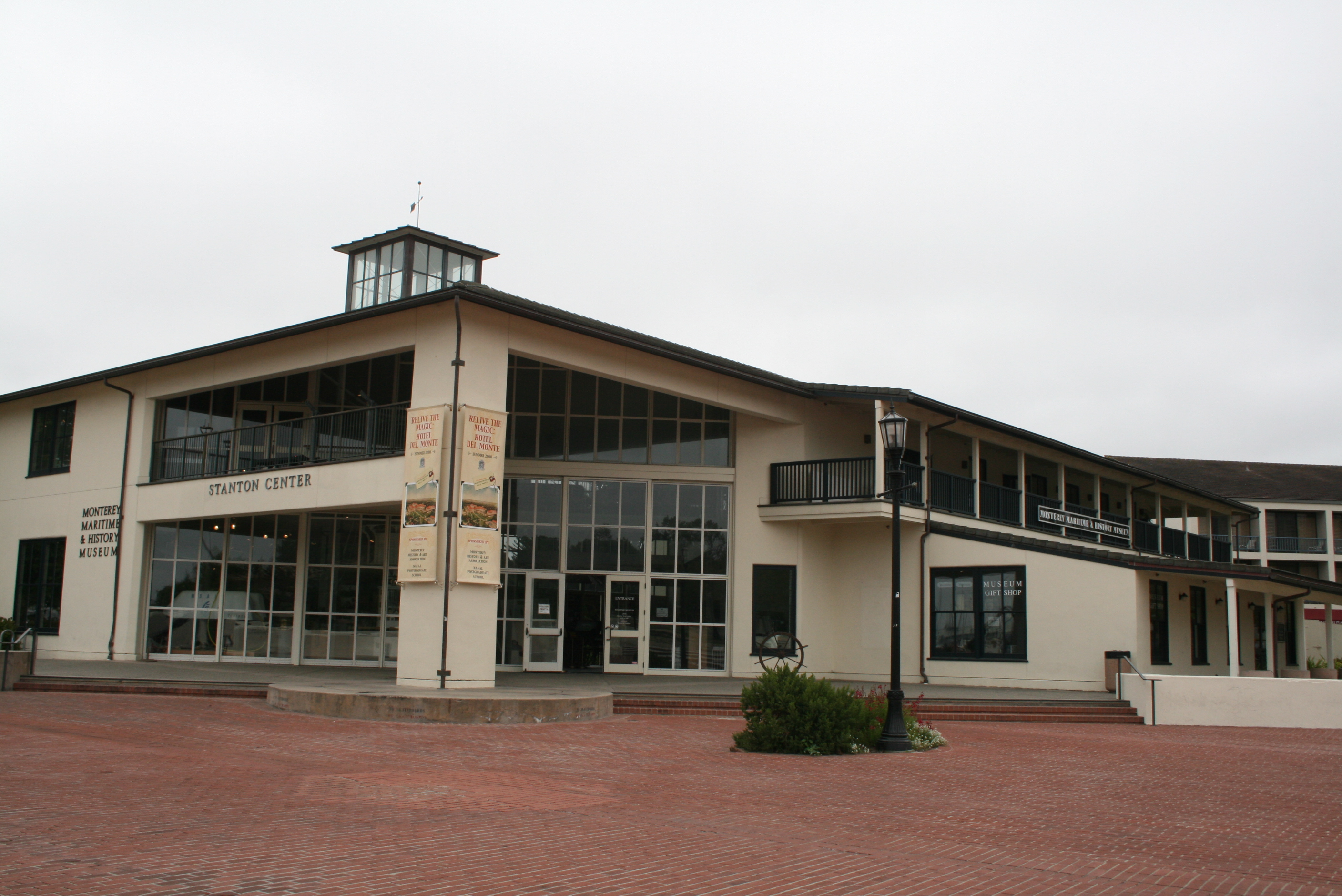
Stanton Center, flagship museum of the MHA, was originally established as the Monterey Maritime Museum.

The flagship museum of the MHA is presently the Stanton Center at Custom House Plaza. This museum is paid entry. It was founded as a maritime museum, but today operates as a more generalized history and art museum. From 2016 to 2022, it operated as the Salvador Dalí Museum, Dalí17, the only permanent Dalí on the West Coast. After the COVID-19 pandemic, Dalí17 was unable to recover financially, and the Board voted to change its mission to focus more generally on local history and art.

== Casa Serrano ==
Casa Serrano, seen here in 2026.

Another museum, free entry but only open one day a week, is Casa Serrano, housing many of the pieces of Jo Mora and other artists. Casa Serrano is where MHA was conceived on the back of a cocktail napkin, back when it used to be an Italian restaurant in the Monterey neighborhood of Spaghetti Hill. In addition to Jo Mora, Casa Serrano also features the works of Armin Hansen, E. Charlton Fortune, Charles Rollo Peters, M. Evelyn McCormick, and Myron Oliver.

== Mayo Hayes O'Donnell Library ==
Mayo Hayes O'Donnell Library.

The Mayo Hayes O'Donnell Library, sitting on the hill overlooking Serra's Landing – the spot where Junípero Serra first landed in Monterey – presently houses the archives of the MHA, and is a dedicated non-circulating research library with two permanent curators. It is in a building that was formerly the Episcopal Church. MHA acquired the building in 1969 from the Urban Renewal Agency, and they physically moved it from its former location to where it sits today, next to another property they owned called the Doud House.

The research collection includes rare books, original letters, photographs and media. These are all available to researchers and members of the public upon request. The papers of Roger S. Fitch, Mayo Hayes O'Donnell, Amelie Elkinton, Minnie Coyle, and Monte Hellam are included in the collection, as are some of the letters of Thomas O. Larkin, and the Hubert Howe Bancroft history books.

== Publications ==
- Noticias del Puerto de Monterey was the quarterly newsletter of the MHA from 1957 to 2009.
