= Monterey History and Art Museum =

Museum in Monterey, California

Stanton Center
- Monterey History and Art Museum at Stanton Center (2026)
- Former name: Allen Knight Maritime Museum; Maritime Museum of Monterey and History Center; Museum of Monterey; Salvador Dalí Museum; Dalí17; Dalí Expo
- Established: October 31, 1992
- Location: 5 Custom House Plaza; Monterey, California, US
- Coordinates: 36.602593°N 121.892859°W
- Type: History museum
- Architect: Robert Stanton
- Owners: Monterey History and Art Association
- Website: https://montereyhistory.org/stanton-center

Stanton Center, which houses the Monterey History and Art Museum, is a fine arts and history museum operated and managed by the Monterey History and Art Association (MHA), located on the Custom House Plaza, adjacent to the Old Customhouse Museum and the Pacific House Museum in Monterey, California. It sits directly on top of the eastern end of the Lighthouse Tunnel. From 1992 to 2016, it functioned as the Maritime Museum of Monterey, and from 2016 to 2022 it was the Salvador Dali Museum. Those expositions have been removed, but some of their works remain. Current permanent exhibits feature works by renowned local artists Jo Mora, Ferdinand Burgdorff, E. Charlton Fortune, Paul Whitman, and Carmel Art Institute cofounder and Carmel Art Association president Armin Hansen. Other exhibits explore facets of local history, i.e. the Rumsen people, the fishing industry and author John Steinbeck.

== Origins at the Museum of Art ==
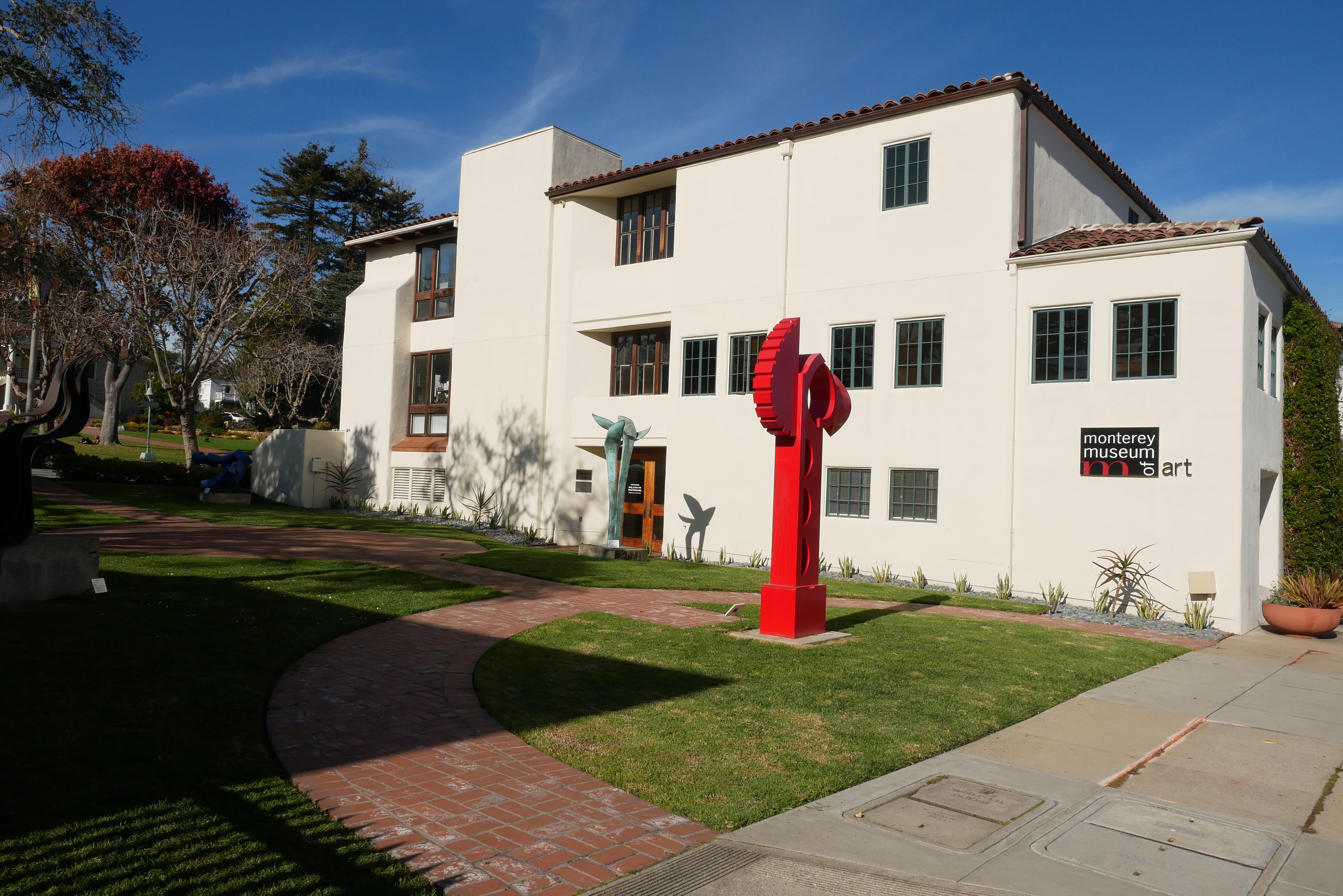
From 1971 to 1999, the original Maritime Museum was on the basement floor of the Monterey Museum of Art, across town from where the Stanton Center sits today.

=== Allen Knight Maritime Museum (1971–1992) ===
The first plans for a maritime museum in Monterey were drawn-up in 1931 by Amelie Elkinton, curator of the Old Customhouse Museum. In 1966, the Monterey History and Art Association (MHA) began planning for the establishment of a maritime museum.

In 1970, Adele Knight, the widow of Allen Knight donated his maritime history collection to MHA, known as the Allen Knight Collection. Allen Knight had been a sailor in 1916, around the time of World War I, and throughout his life collected artifacts and memorabilia related to maritime activities. In order to accommodate this expansive collection, the MHA board accelerated their timeframe, and in 1971, opened the Allen Knight Maritime Museum in the basement floor of the Monterey Museum of Art.

This arrangement in the basement of the art museum on Calle Principal was meant to be temporary, but it took two decades until a permanent maritime museum could be established.

== Maritime Museum of Monterey and History Center (1992–2016) ==
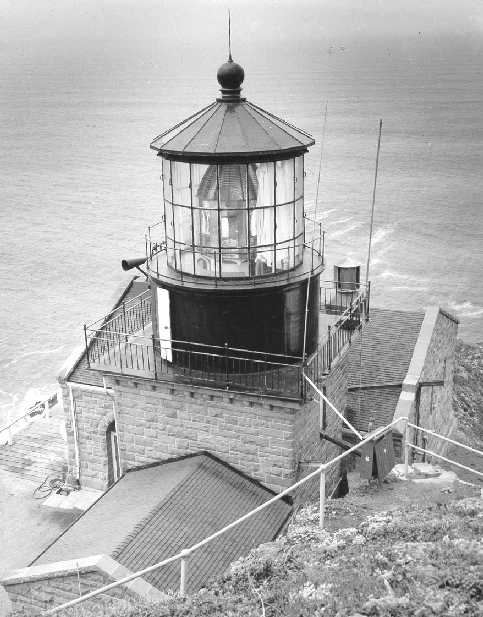
The Fresnel lens from the Point Sur Lighthouse was on display at the Maritime Museum of Monterey for many years.

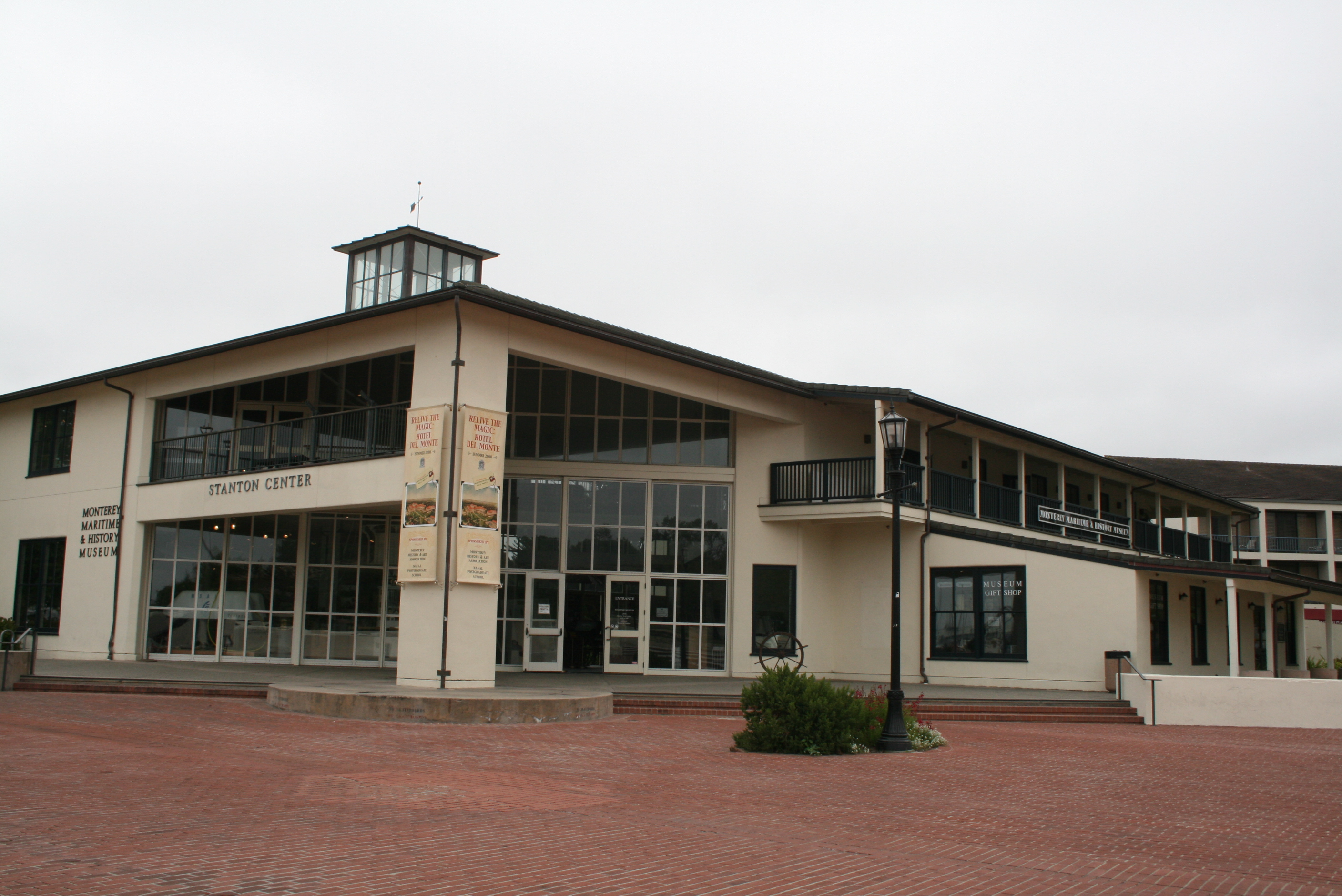
Exterior of the Maritime Museum in 2008.

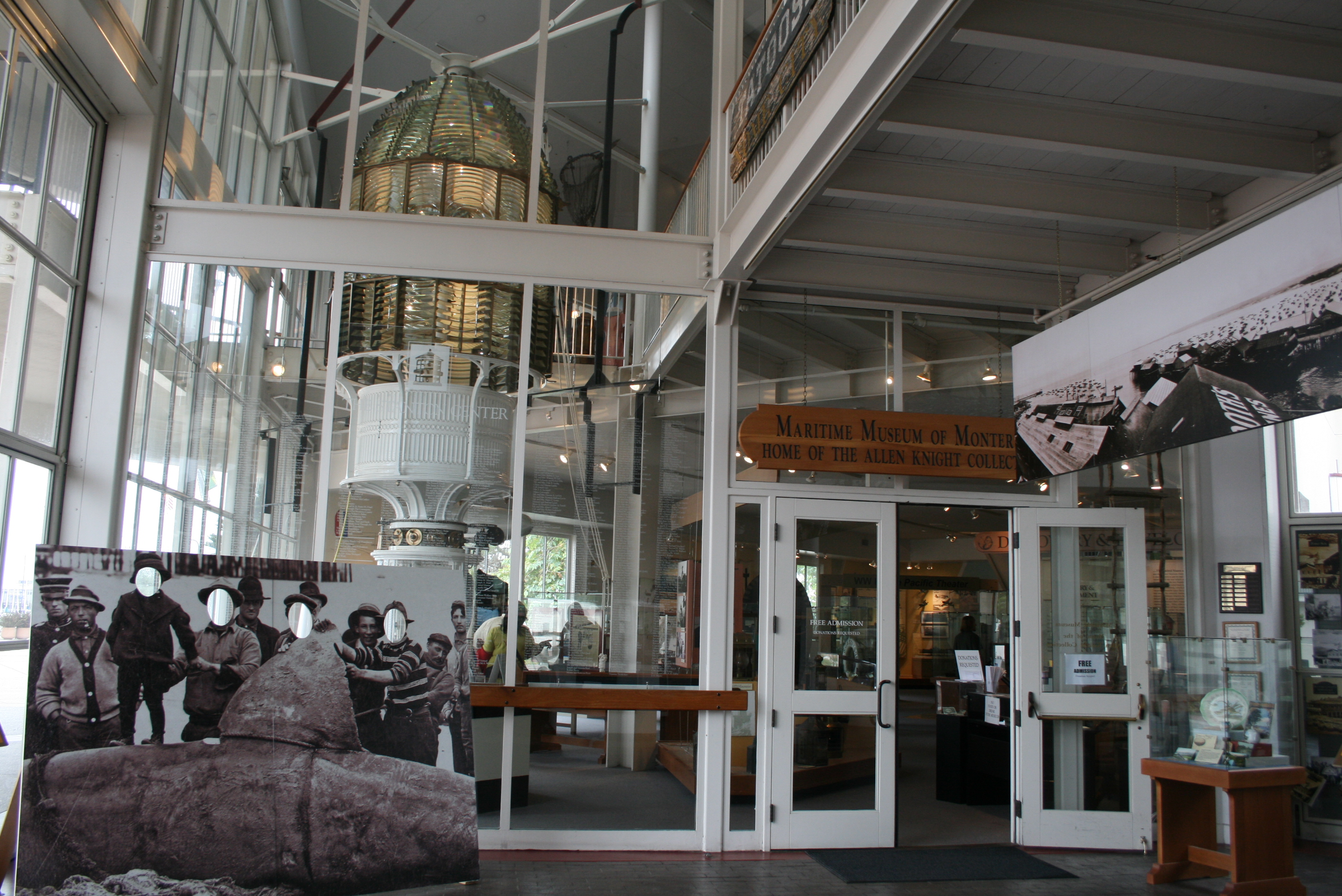
Interior view of the Maritime Museum in 2008. The Fresnel lens is on the left.

The proposal for a new museum was approved in 1982, but funding was not fully acquired until 1991. Virginia Stanton donated a $1 million gift to the new construction. On July 15, 1991, construction began on the new Maritime Museum on Custom House Plaza. The principal designer and architect was Robert Stanton. The new museum opened on October 31, 1992.

By 2008, the Maritime Museum held almost 6000 artifacts, over 50,000 photographs, and papers. There were seven exhibits sorted by historical era, including; Rumsien/Ohlone era, Spanish exploration era, artifacts from the USS Macon and the Pacific War, and the sarding fishing and canning era of Cannery Row and Monterey.

For many years, one of the maritime museum's main attractions was the Fresnel lens that had formerly been installed in the Point Sur Lighthouse, reconstructed at the entrance of the museum.

In 2014, the Internal Revenue Service launched an official audit of MHA. They announced that MHA was losing $8,000 a month, and that MHA were given until the first of January, 2015, to find a sub-leaseholder for all or part of the Stanton Center. The President of MHA at the time, Eric Sand, said that their financial difficulties began during California's economic crisis in 2003, when the state pulled its funding of MHA's venture. In 2015, the museum was still not a profitable venture, as MHA had acquired $200,000 in debt over the course of several years. Their original endowment of $3 million was not gaining any revenue, and had been "bleeding" cash from the Stanton Center's establishment in 1992. In the Fall of 2015, MHA stated that they were open to a third-party vendor renting-out their exhibition spaces.

In 2016, the San Francisco Maritime National Park Association acquired the Allen Knight Collection.

== Salvador Dalí Museum (2016–2022) ==
=== Dalí17 (2017–2018) ===
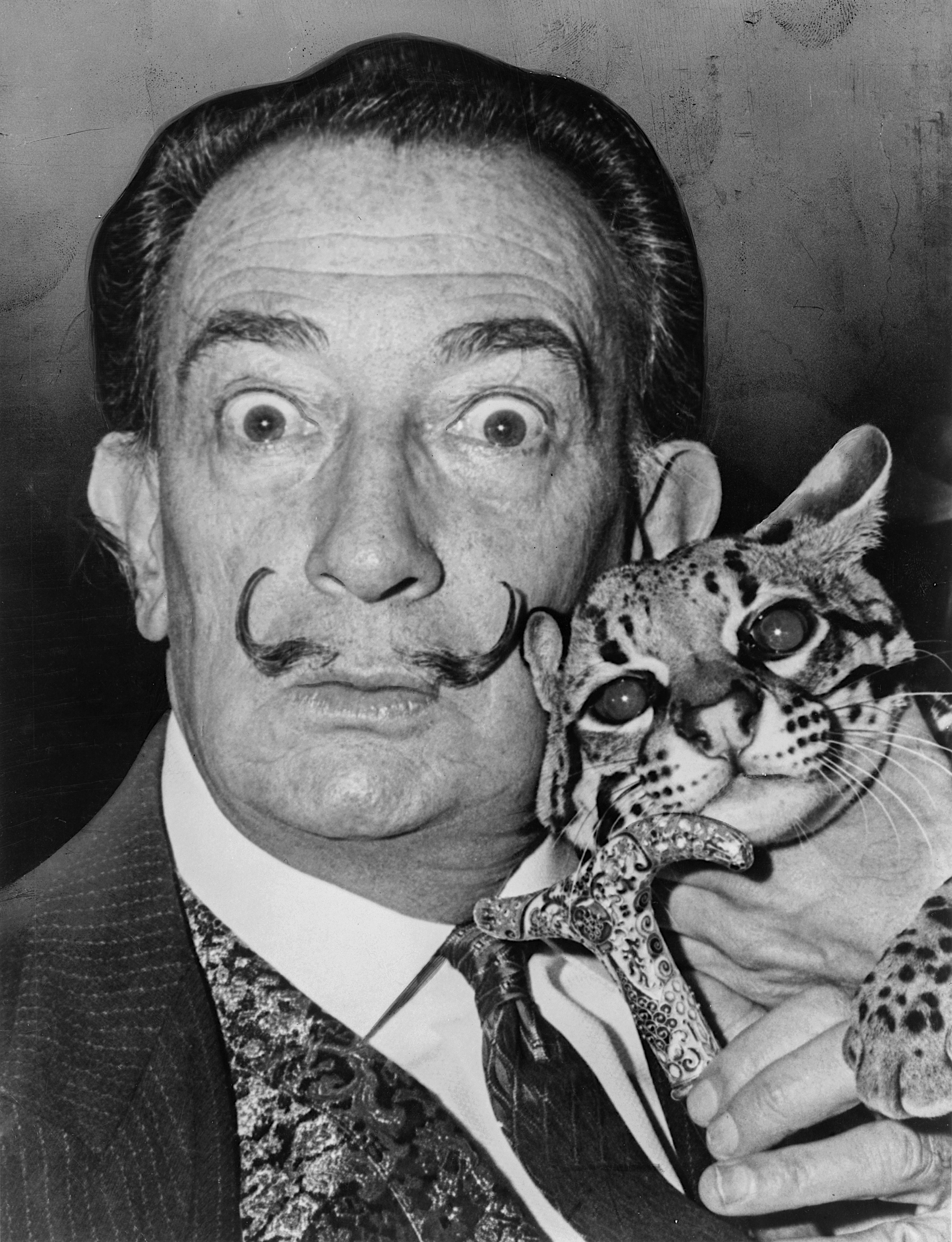
Stanton Center became the first-ever permanent exhibition space for Salvador Dalí on the West Coast, but the Dalí Museum did not bring in enough customers to pay the museum's overhead.

In August 2015, MHA President Larry Chavez announced that four groups had submitted proposals to rent-out the exhibition space. On February 16, 2016, wealthy Ukrainian investor Dmitry Piterman was voted onto the board of MHA. Almost minutes later, his publicist called local newspapers to announce that the Stanton Center would soon become the first-ever permanent exhibition dedicated to the works of the world-famous surrealist artist Salvador Dalí on the entire West Coast of the United States.

Interior view of Dalí17.

Salvador Dalí himself had lived and worked in the Monterey Peninsula during and after World War II. His connection to the Hotel Del Monte, and to many of the founders of the MHA itself, including Samuel Finley Brown Morse, allowed the nonprofit to display his work as a "local" without breaking their contract with the city. Dalí and Gala, his wife, lived in Monterey from 1940 to 1948. Dalí and his wife Gala took refuge from war-torn Europe in Monterey, where they lived at the Hotel Del Monte.

Piterman, who at the time owned a Dalí collection of over 500 pieces, donated over half of his collection to MHA, promising to donate the remainder at a later date. Piterman and the rest of the MHA board envisioned that the Stanton Center would become a well known institution built off of this collection, and would draw-in tourism from around the world to Monterey. They also envisioned that the Stanton Center would become the second-largest attraction in the town, competing for visitors with the Monterey Bay Aquarium.

Interior view of Dalí17 in 2017, shortly after their establishment of a virtual reality tour.

The Dalí Museum held its ribbon-cutting ceremony on Thursday, July 7, 2016. Later that night they held a private reception for 200 guests.

The company Piterman created to manage the collection was named Dalí17, which became another name for the museum. At around the same time, the Monterey County Assessor declared: "Last year the dynamics of the operation seem to have changed." The Assessor at the time, Steve Vagnini, stated that Stanton Center would need to increase its tax payments to the government from $370 a year to $70,000 a year. Piterman and Dalí 17 then got into a legal battle with the county government. By the end of this legal battle, Piterman lost interest in managing the Dalí Collection, leaving daily operations to others and stepping away from the museum.

Dalí17 established a virtual reality tour, surrealist cinema showings in the theatre space, a visiting speaker series, and painting workshops.

In 2018, the Salvador Dalí Foundation, the foundation created by the artist himself, based in Figueres, sued Dalí17 for copyright infringement, filing in federal court that Dalí17 had “misappropriated his name and likeness to advertise and promote their museum.” The foundation claimed to have been granted the sole copyright authority over Dalí by the King of Spain. Piterman noted that Dalí himself had been a member of the Carmel Art Association, and often showed his own paintings in Monterey of his own accord.

=== Dalí Expo (2018–2022) ===
Exterior view of the Dalí Expo in 2021.

In December 2018, after the lawsuits, Dalí17 rebranded to become the Dalí Expo.

In the summer of 2019, the Dalí Expo was forced to close due to the COVID-19 pandemic in the United States. In May 2021, the magic company PREpresents from Lake Tahoe entered into a joint-venture with Dalí 17 to use the Stanton Center's 100-seat theatre as a permanent magic show exhibition space, where stage magicians would perform. Their plan was to begin shows on Memorial Day. The Stanton Center did not reopen its doors until May 28, 2021.

The Dalí Expo was not as profitable as the MHA board had hoped it would be, and did not draw as many customers as it needed to break even. Meanwhile, the ongoing tax battle with the Monterey County Assessor's office meant that if the museum wanted to keep displaying the Dalí Expo and charging customers to see it, they would need to pay the Assessor's office tens of thousands of dollars or risk having the building taken from the MHA and repossessed by the City of Monterey.

== Monterey History and Art Museum (2022–Present) ==
To meet the ultimatum of the County Assessor's office, a poll was sent out in Fall 2021 to their general membership by MHA President Gary Spradlin, explaining the situation. Afterwards, MHA's Board of Directors decided to drastically shift the focus of the museum's displays to remove the Dalí Expo and display more local art. Where Dali had been the key feature of the art exhibits for some time, MHA sent most of their Dali pieces into storage.

Local artist Jo Mora today maintains a large presence at the Stanton Center, but MHA also displays even more of his works at Casa Serrano, one of their other museums in Monterey.

Around the same time in 2021, the entire remaining archived works of the artist Jo Mora were sold by the Jo Mora Trust to MHA, which already possessed many of his works. The Jo Mora Collection became the new centerpiece for the museum, being one of the more famous artists of the area.

The magic company left in 2022.

Gift shop at the Stanton Center, seen here in September 2026, selling many replicas of the work of Jo Mora.

Many of the windows that had been covered for the Dalí Expo were uncovered in 2022 and 2023, letting in natural light. An exhibition dedicated to Virginia Stanton and Robert Stanton was installed on the first floor.

In 2023, the Italian Heritage Society of the Monterey Peninsula signed a two-year contract to display the Italian Heritage Exhibit on the first floor of the museum.

In 2023, MHA entirely removed the exterior signage for the Dalí Expo, replacing them with temporary banners displaying present exhibits. They hired the artist Robert Wecker of the Wecker Group to design new permanent signage for the exterior of the museum, and hired the company Monterey Signs to install them once they were completed.

To celebrate the 150th birthday anniversary of the artist Jo Mora, MHA announced in September 2026 that they would display an exhibition of photographs by Lewis Josselyn of Jo Mora called Jo Mora and Family. This exhibit will run from October through December 2026.
