= Serra's Landing =

Site where Monterey was established

Coordinates: 36°36′16″N 121°53′43″W

Serra's Landing is a small public park and historical landmark in Monterey, California, on the border between Spaghetti Hill and New Monterey, beneath the Lower Presidio of the Presidio of Monterey. It sits just next to the northern entrance of the Lighthouse Tunnel. It is California Historical Landmark number 128. Although the park today is more commonly known as Serra's Landing – it is the site of both Serra's Landing (1770), and to the north about 20 yards, Vizcaíno's Landing (1602). It was at this site where the Spanish settlement of Monterey was first established by Gaspar de Portolá. When the railroad was built to Cannery Row, several hundred feet of shoreline was extended as backfill, to provide a firmer ground for the trains to sit on.

== Vizcaíno's Landing (1602) ==
This carved stone cross, outside the entrance to the Lower Presidio of Monterey, marks the original site of the Vizcaíno-Serra Oak, where the first Catholic Mass north of San Diego was celebrated.

On December 16, 1602, Sebastián Vizcaíno entered the refuge of a large bay and anchored in place for the evening. His fleet comprised the San Diego, the Santo Tomás, and the Tres Reyes. The sailors named the waters Monterey Bay, in honor of Gaspar de Zúñiga, 5th Count of Monterrey. Most of the sailors on the expedition were suffering from scurvy by this point in the journey, and 16 had already died.

On the morning of December 17, Vizcaíno took a landing force and landed on the beach. Vizcaíno declared California in the name of the king of Spain. The first Catholic mass north of San Diego was celebrated by Father Andrés de la Asunción, and two other Carmelite Friars. A large carved stone cross indicates the site where a large oak tree once stood, where the mass took place.

That tree eventually became known as the Vizcaíno-Serra Oak.

The expedition encamped here until January 3, 1603, celebrating Christmas Mass in the area as well, under the same oak tree. As the legend goes, this was the first Christmas tree in all of California. A cutting of this tree was later in the possession of the Catholic Church at the Mission San Carlos Borromeo de Carmelo.

Several dozen Rumsen people watched this expedition from a distance, observing them take mass.

== Serra's Landing (1770) ==
This stone marker identifies the location of Serra's Landing and the foundation of the Presidio of Monterey.

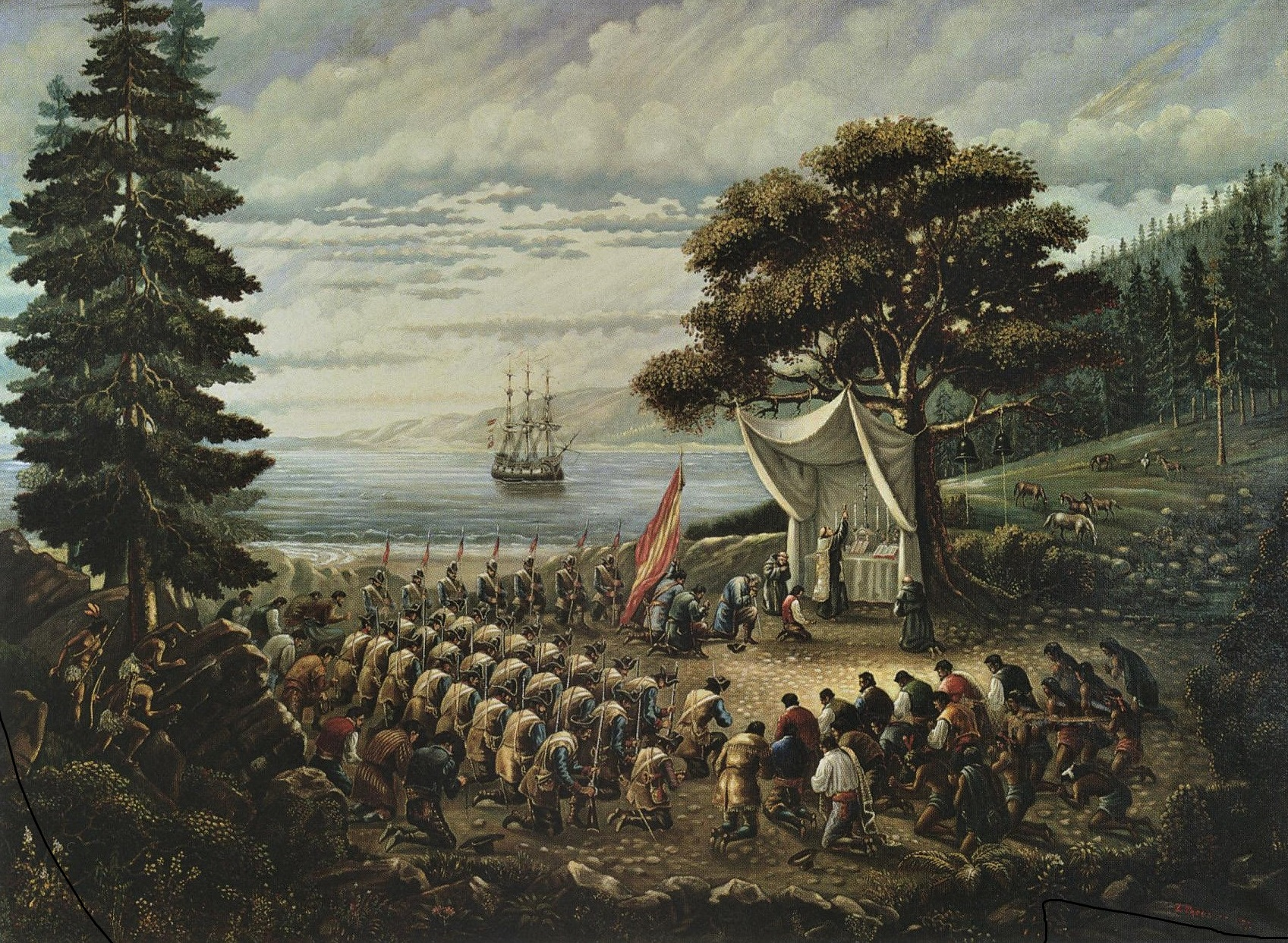
A depiction of Junípero Serra celebrating Mass under the Vizcaíno-Serra Oak on 3 June 1770.

On June 3, 1770, Junípero Serra landed here in a dinghy launched from the San Antonio. He walked inland from this spot to join Gaspar de Portolá and Juan Crespí. The three of them then created the Mission San Carlos and the Presidio of Monterey. Portolá and Crespi had arrived overland from San Diego the week before.

Later that day, Serra celebrated mass under the same old oak tree that Father Andrés de la Asunción had celebrated mass over a century earlier.
