= Phoenix buttons =

Phoenix buttons were designed to be used on Haitian military uniforms during the 1811-1820 reign of Henry Christophe (King Henry I of Haiti, 1811-1820). These buttons carry the image of a phoenix bird, included regimental numbers and were, "made of a good grade brass". By the time the buttons had been ordered, manufactured in England, and received in Haiti, Christophe was dead. What happened to these buttons after Christophe's death is unknown until 1832 when they were purchased by Nathaniel Wyeth. Wyeth purchased the buttons to be included in his inventory of goods for sale in the Columbia River Region (now the border between Oregon and Washington States) where Wyeth hoped his business would successfully compete with the Hudson's Bay Company. It is still not fully documented how and when phoenix buttons ended up in California. There have been several historical and archeological research studies that have put together a likely chronology of events.

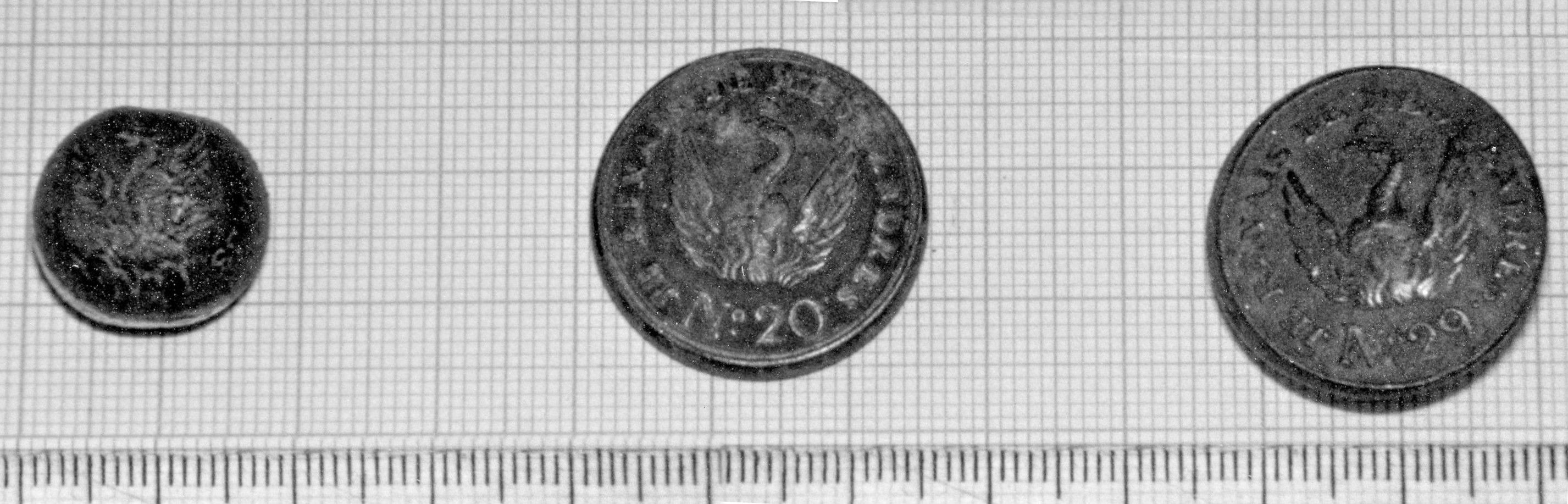
Phoenix buttons from CA-SCR-217 HT, Lost Adobe Excavations 1981-1984

== Phoenix buttons arrival on the Columbia River ==
Emory Strong’s 1975 definitive article "The Enigma of the Phoenix Button" developed his previous work on phoenix buttons. Strong created the definitive analytic types of phoenix buttons still used in research, that categorizes them into three types and two sizes. When Strong's 1975 article was written, the great majority of phoenix button were found along the Columbia River.

In the late 1990s, Roderic Sprague mapped a wider distribution of phoenix buttons noting two areas of phoenix button occurrence, along the Columbia River and throughout Alta California. Sprague noted that the Columbia River Phoenix buttons seem to originate with Wyeth's efforts to compete with the well-established Hudson Bay Company in that area. Wyeth's ship, which was carrying much of his trading goods was "delayed due to misadventures in the Pacific" and did not arrive to the Columbia River until the Fall of 1834 and so it is unlikely that phoenix buttons could have arrived in that area before that date. Wyeth withdrew from the Columbia in late 1836 and at that time sold his entire operations west of the Rockies to the Hudson's Bay Company.

== Phoenix buttons in California ==
Phoenix buttons have been found in archaeological excavations in California at several sites (see the Santa Cruz Mission Lost Adobe for one example). The buttons have been found as far south as the original 1769 site of Mission San Diego de Alcalá by San Diego Bay at Old Town. Finding the buttons this far south may indicate that Wyeth's ship may have stopped in San Diego Bay to trade with the Mission and Mission Indians before heading north.

How the phoenix buttons got to California is still undocumented. Given that Wyeth sold his inventory to the Hudson Bay Company in 1836, it is possible that some of the phoenix buttons were part of the Hudson Bay Company trade to California.

One possible trade route was via the trapper companies fur trade with the California indigenous peoples. The Hudson Bay Company had groups of fur trappers in Northern and Central California all through the 1830s, and into the early 1840s, led for many years by a Frenchman, Michel Laframoise. Their southernmost camp, known as French Camp, was near present day Stockton. However, if the Hudson Bay Company had issued the buttons to the trappers to barter with the indigenous peoples of Northern California's Sacramento Valley, there should have been buttons found at indigenous sites in that area. None have been found. Also unexplained, is how the trade buttons would have ended up as far south as San Diego if they had been distributed by the Hudson Bay Company.

Another possible route is that the buttons were part of Hudson Bay Company's shipping trade with the San Francisco/Monterey Bay area and then on to other places in the Mexican Republic zone. John McLoughlin (HBC chief factor) suggested that the Hudson Bay Company engaged Don Diego Forbes (James Alexander Forbes) as a sales agent for California in 1834. Forbes worked for Hudson Bay from 1836-1841. The Hudson Bay Company inventory of phoenix buttons would have likely been distributed by Forbes.

Sprague’s 1990s maps cataloged where phoenix buttons had been found in California. He noted that buttons have been recovered at all Mission and Pueblo sites and some ranchos. That phoenix buttons were found at these sites suggests that phoenix buttons were distributed through the Mexican Republic zone of California via internal trade systems. Phoenix buttons were also found at Fort Ross, Bodega Bay and at Sutter’s Fort. These communities traded extensively with the Bay Area Missions.

Buttons were also found in the San Joaquin Valley at indigenous village sites. Some scholars have suggested phoenix buttons may have been used for "decorating Men's clothing",” and were items "associated with social displays of high status" among indigenous peoples. Many people in these villages were captured by the Spanish Missionaries. When they could escape, these people often returned to their home sites, often bringing with them goods from the missions, perhaps even these phoenix buttons.

== Probable 1837 date for phoenix buttons arrival in California ==
Examining the Hudson Bay Company cargo ships arriving and departing from the San Francisco Bay area after 1836 (the date of Wyeth's sale of his inventory to the Hudson Bay Company) there are three possible arrival date for phoenix buttons: January 1837 on the brig Lama; October 1837 on the schooner Cadboro); and August 1838, again on the Cadboro. Allowing time for bureaucratic inventory procedures by the Hudson Bay Company, the most likely of these arrivals is the 1837 run of the schooner, Cadboro, which left the Columbia River in September 1837 and arrived first in San Francisco and then in Monterey, in October 1837. Forbes was the commercial agent for the Hudson Bay Company from 1836 to 1841, and assuming he utilized his connections with the Missions, the earliest date the buttons were likely to arrive at various Mission establishments in the San Francisco Bay area would be the winter of 1837–38. The likelihood of this date is supported by a find of a phoenix buttons at the Petaluma Adobe in a buried trench for what appears to be the "hasty disposal of possibly contaminated possessions" infected by smallpox during the Miramontes epidemic of 1837-1839. It is likely that the buttons arrived in the Bay area of California no earlier than 1837 and no later than 1839.
