= Vizcaíno-Serra Oak =

Landmark Quercus agrifolia in Monterey, California

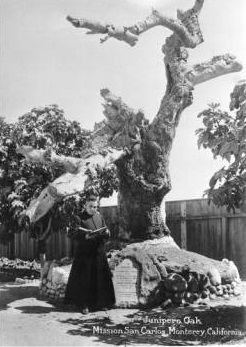
The preserved trunk and lower branches of the Vizcaíno-Serra Oak erected on the grounds of the Cathedral of San Carlos Borromeo in 1905

The Vizcaíno-Serra Oak (also known as the Junípero Oak) was a large California live oak tree closely associated with Junípero Serra and the early history of Monterey, California. First described in 1602 by the explorer Sebastián Vizcaíno, it stood in Serra's Landing, next to a creek in what is now Monterey State Historic Park. The tree was declared dead in 1904 and cut down in 1905. The preserved trunk and lower branches were erected in the grounds of the Cathedral of San Carlos Borromeo where they remained for most of the 20th century. Although the remains of the tree have since been removed, pieces of it are on display in local museums.

== History ==
The tree once stood in a ravine whose creek flowed into the southern end of Monterey Bay. It was there that the Sebastián Vizcaíno expedition drew fresh water after entering the bay on December 3, 1602. On December 17, 1602 the Carmelite friars of the Vizcaíno expedition held a mass under the tree and Vizcaíno claimed Monterey for Spain. Vizcaíno also noted the tree in his descriptions of the bay for future expeditions. In 1769 Gaspar de Portolà led an expedition to find the bay and establish Monterey as a Spanish settlement. After initially failing to find it, he was successful in May 1770 after following Junípero Serra's suggestion to look for the large oak tree described by Vizcaíno. On June 3, 1770 bells were hung from the tree. Serra said a Mass in an arbor constructed under the tree and the military officers of the Portolà expedition unfurled the Spanish flag.

Although damaged by lightning in 1840, the tree continued to stand as a landmark until 1905. In 1903 workmen repairing a culvert near the tree had caused what later proved to be irreversible sea-water damage to its roots. William Randolph Hearst bought the plot of land on which the tree stood with the intention of asking Congress to cede further land to construct a memorial park around the tree and preserve it from future intrusions. However, in July 1904 the tree was declared dead, and a year later it was cut down and thrown into Monterey Bay.

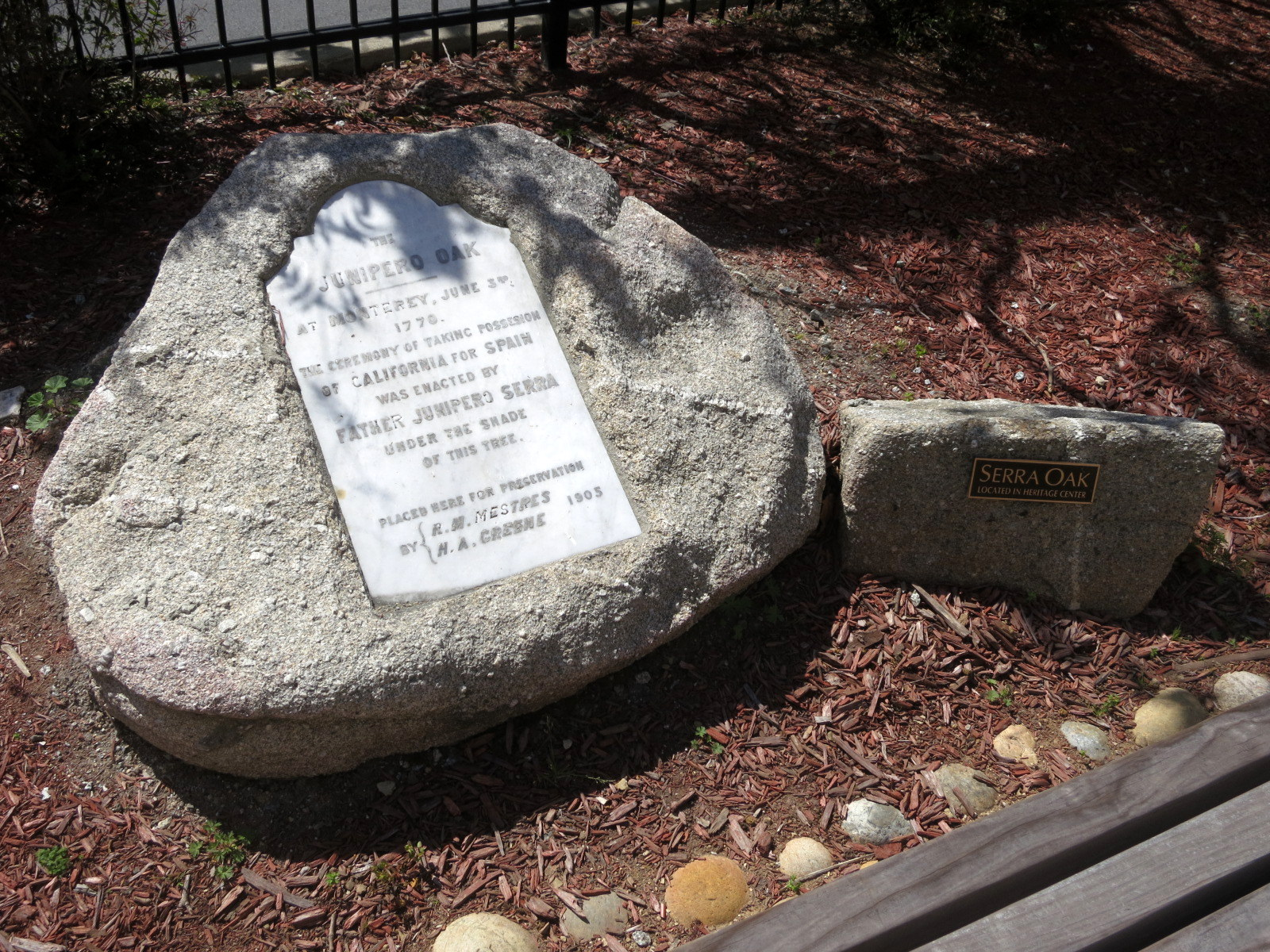
The 1905 plaque in the grounds of the Cathedral of San Carlos Borromeo marking the site where the preserved remains of the tree once stood

When Ramón Mestres, the pastor of the Cathedral of San Carlos Borromeo, discovered what had happened, he had the tree hauled out of the bay by local fishermen and brought to the grounds of the cathedral. With financial help from Harry Ashland Greene, the trunk and some of its lower branches was preserved with crude oil and creosote and the parts which had been eaten away were filled with concrete. The remains of the tree were then erected on a pedestal in the gardens at the rear of the cathedral. A commemorative plaque was placed at its foot. The dedication reads:

The Junipero Oak. At Monterey, June 3rd, 1770 the ceremony of taking possession of California for Spain was enacted by Father Junipero Serra under the shade of this tree, placed here for preservation by R.M. Mestres, H.A. Greene, 1905

Greene also commissioned local craftsmen to make chairs out of some of its branches, two of which he donated to the Native Sons of the Golden West. One of the chairs, owned by California State Parks, was exhibited at the Panama Pacific International Exposition and was on display at the Pacific Grove Museum of Natural History in 2015 and 2016.

In 1908, a granite Celtic cross with a bas-relief portrait of Serra sculpted by Douglas Tilden was erected near the original site of the tree by the art collector James A. Murray and is now a California Historical Landmark. Murray, who had made his fortune in the Montana mining industry, settled in Monterey in 1904. He took a keen interest in Monterey's history and owned one of the three paintings by Léon Trousset depicting Serra's first Mass beneath the oak tree. Murray's wife commissioned "The Passing of an Oak", a poem by Mary Sullivan Spence commemorating the tree. It was published in a limited edition in 1909.

The preserved tree eventually decayed beyond repair and was removed from the cathedral grounds, leaving only the plaque which had been placed beneath it in 1905. However pieces of the tree are on display at the San Carlos Cathedral Heritage Center and at the Carmel Mission museum.

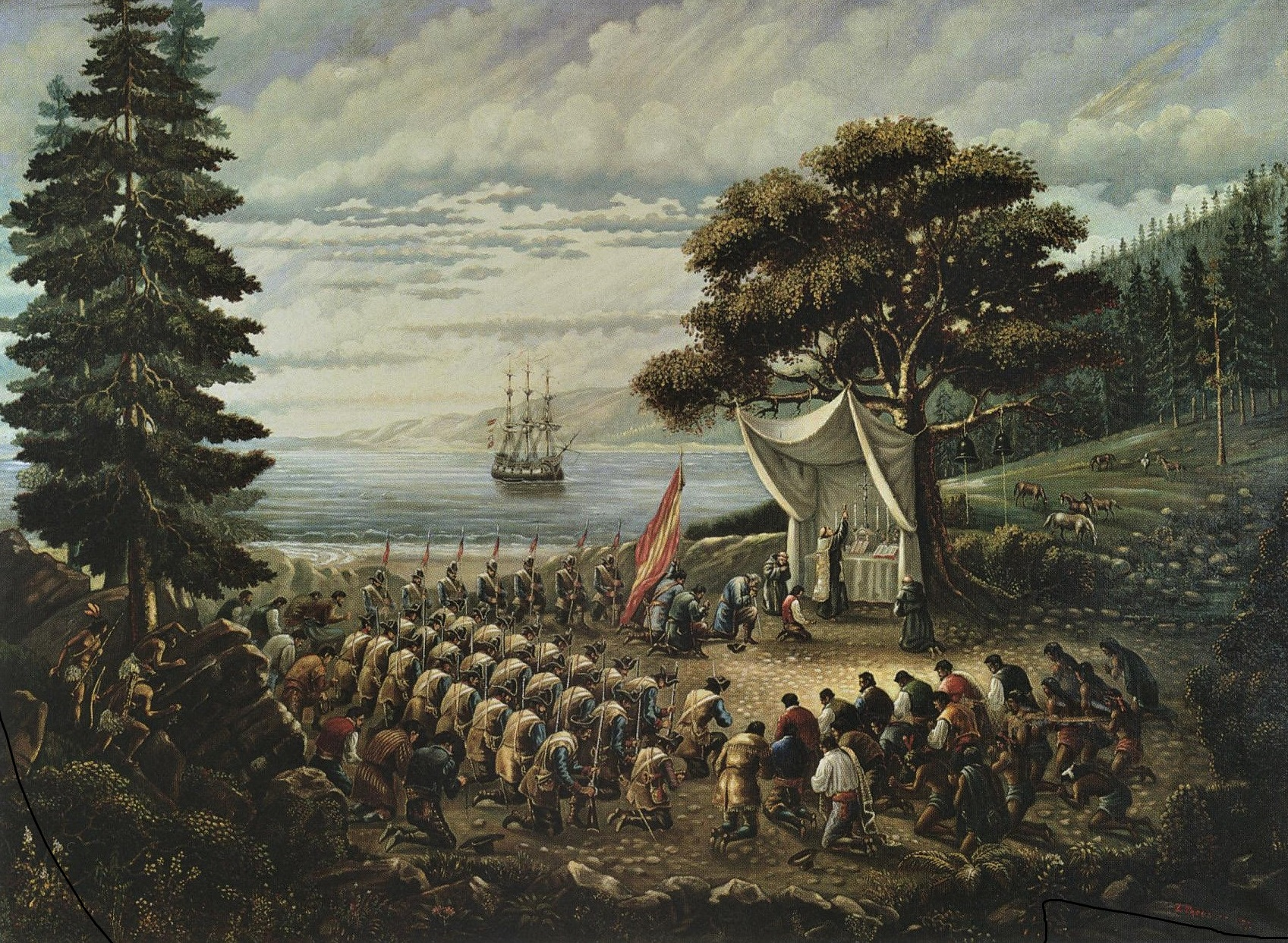
Father Serra Celebrates Mass at Monterey by Léon Trousset, 1877

== In art ==
In 2015 a mural, commissioned by the city of Monterey and depicting what the tree might have looked like to Sebastián Vizcaíno in 1602, was erected along the Monterey Bay Coastal Recreation Trail. The 12-foot by 5-foot work is attached to a wall opposite Fisherman's Wharf. Its artist, scientific illustrator Stephanie Rozzo, based the painting on late 19th-century photographs of the tree and an 1876 drawing by Jules Tavernier.

Two other European artists who frequented Tavernier's art colony also painted the Vizcaíno-Serra Oak—Carl von Perbandt and Léon Trousset. In the 1870s Trousset created three romanticized depictions (two in oil and one in watercolor) of Junipero Serra celebrating Mass beneath the tree on June 3, 1770. Trousset's large-scale 1877 version, Father Serra Celebrates Mass at Monterey, is on display in the Carmel Mission museum. Another version is held by the California Historical Society.

== See also ==
- List of individual trees

Media related to Vizcaíno-Serra Oak at Wikimedia Commons
