= Steve Hauk =

American journalist, writer

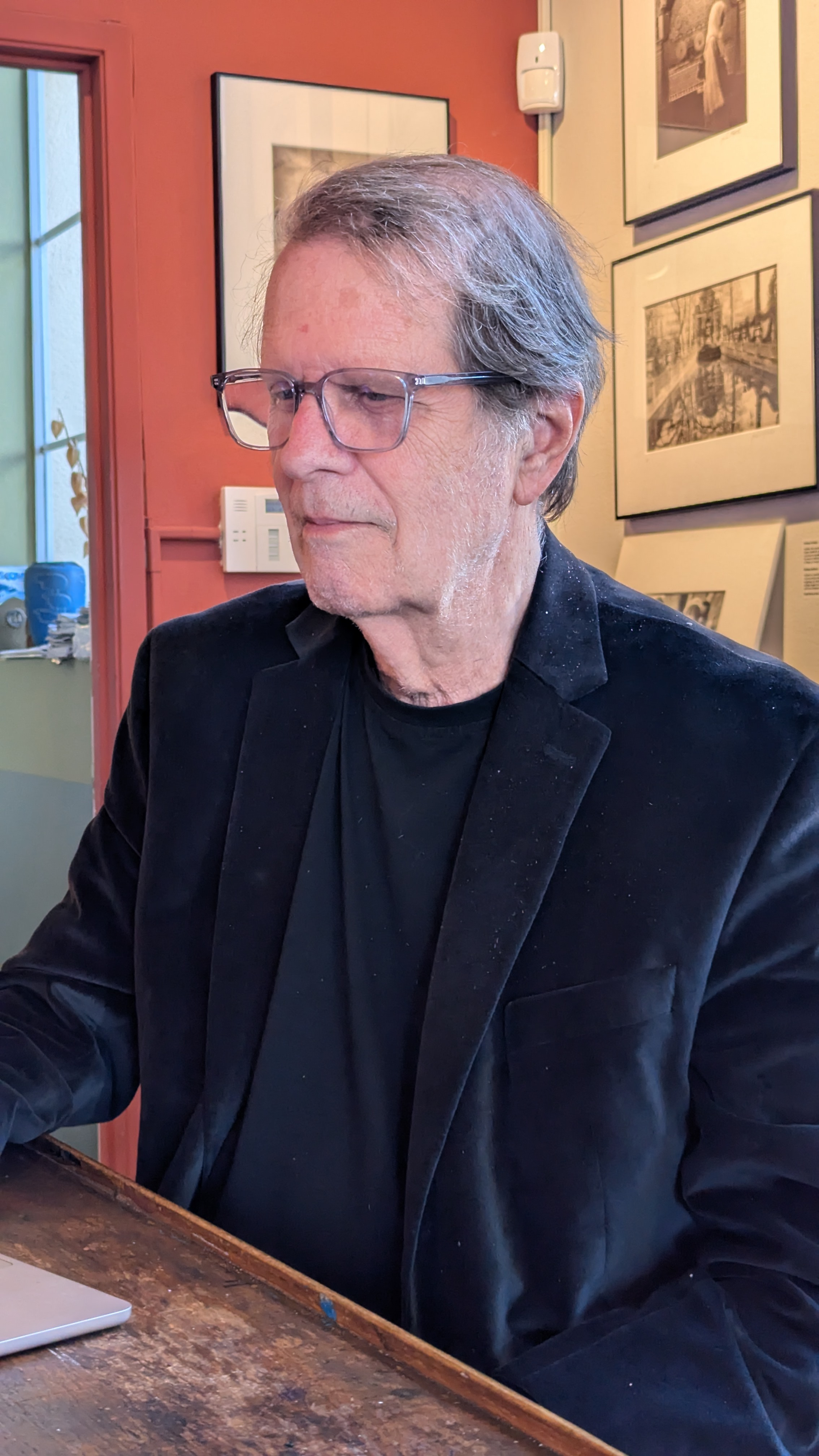
- Steve Hauk in 2024
- Born: Stephen L. Hauk
- Occupations: Journalist; Playwright; Gallery Owner
- Spouse: Nancy Hauk (deceased)
- Children: Amy Hauk, Anne Hauk
- Writing career
- Genres: Playwriting; Non-fiction

Steve Hauk is an American journalist, writer, playwright, and gallery owner, known for his diverse contributions to the arts and literature. Hauk is particularly noted for his exploration of early California art, John Steinbeck's life, and history of Monterey Bay.

Hauk is a former reporter and documentary filmmaker. He co-curated the inaugural art exhibition at the National Steinbeck Center and authored the play Fortune's Way, or Notes on Art for Catholics (and Others), based on the life of impressionist painter E. Charlton Fortune. The play, was first presented at the Carmel Mission. His gallery in Pacific Grove showcases both contemporary and early California art, featuring works by artists such as Armin Hansen and Belle Yang. Hauk's wrote "Steinbeck: The Untold Stories" and has produced two CINE Golden Eagle award-winning PBS telecast documentaries. He wrote "Eden Armed: A Play in Four Scenes" which is a theatrical work exploring the emotional and physical challenges faced by author John Steinbeck after his writings gave voice to agricultural workers. The play, a fictional narrative rooted in factual events, follows Steinbeck's experiences of vilification and threats, particularly after the publication of "Of Mice and Men" in 1937." Steve Hauk was married to Nancy Hauk, whose works were exhibited at the Pacific Grove Public Library, where the gallery is named in her honor. They had two daughters, Amy and Anne.
