= USNS Mission Santa Cruz =

History

United States
- Name: SS Mission Santa Cruz
- Namesake: Mission Santa Cruz
- Builder: Marine Ship Corporation, Sausalito, California
- Laid down: 26 June 1943
- Launched: 8 September 1943
- Sponsored by: Mrs. Frank C. Sewell
- Acquired: 24 October 1947
- In service: 24 October 1947
- Reclassified: AO-133, October 1947; T-AO133, October 1949
- Fate: Scrapped June 1971

General characteristics
- Displacement: 21,880 tons full; 5,532 tons light
- Length: 524 ft (160 m)
- Beam: 68 ft (21 m)
- Draft: 30 ft (9.1 m)
- Propulsion: Turbo-electric, single screw, 6,000 hp (4,500 kW)
- Speed: 16.5 knots (31 km/h; 19 mph)
- Complement: 52 mariners

SS Mission Santa Cruz was a Type T2-SE-A2 tanker built for the United States Maritime Commission during World War II. After the war she was acquired by the United States Navy as USS Mission Santa Cruz (AO-133). Later she transferred to the Military Sea Transportation Service as USNS Mission Santa Cruz (T-AO-133). She was a member of the Mission Buenaventura class and was named for Mission Santa Cruz in Santa Cruz, California.

== Career ==
Mission Santa Cruz was laid downon 26 June 1943 under a Maritime Commission contract by Marine Ship Corporation, Sausalito, California; launched on 8 September 1943; sponsored by Mrs. Frank C. Sewell; and delivered on 31 December 1943. Chartered to Deconhill Shipping Corporation for operations, she spent the remainder of the War carrying fuel to American forces fighting in the Pacific, receiving the National Defense Service Medal. She remained in this capacity until 3 June 1946 when she was returned to the Maritime Commission and laid up in the Maritime Reserve Fleet at Mobile, Alabama.

Acquired by the Navy 24 October 1947, she was placed in service with the Naval Transportation Service as Mission Santa Cruz (AO-133). Placed under the operational control of the new Military Sea Transportation Service on 1 October 1949 she was redesignated USNS Mission Santa Cruz (T-AO-133). She served with MSTS until 23 November 1954 when she was transferred to the Maritime Administration and laid up in the Maritime Reserve Fleet at Beaumont, Texas.

Reacquired by the Navy 10 July 1956 she was placed in service with MSTS and served until 4 December 1959 when she was transferred to the Maritime Administration and laid up in the Maritime Reserve Fleet at Mobile. Reacquired by the Navy 31 May 1960 Mission Santa Cruz was placed in service with MSTS once again and as of 1969 she was still serving MSTS.

The ship was scrapped in Baltimore in June 1971.
