= Mission Santa Cruz =

18th-century Spanish Catholic mission in California, US

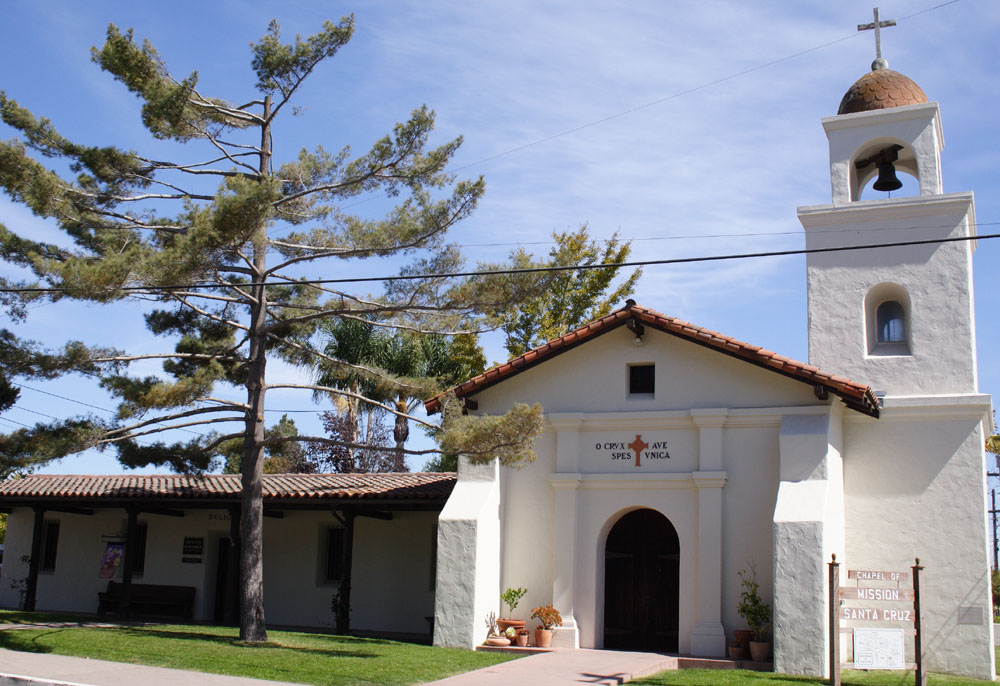
- The Mission Santa Cruz chapel replica
- Location: 130 Emmett Street; Santa Cruz, California, U.S.
- Coordinates: 36°58′41″N 122°1′46″W
- Name as founded: La Misión de la Exaltación de la Santa Cruz
- English translation: The Mission of the Exaltation of the Holy Cross
- Patron: The Exaltation of the Cross
- Nickname: "The Hard-luck Mission"
- Founded: August 28, 1791
- Founded by: Father Fermín Francisco de Lasuén
- Founding Order: Twelfth
- Military district: Fourth
- Native tribe: Awaswas, Mutsun, Yokuts; Costeño
- Native place name: Aulintak
- Baptisms: 2,765
- Marriages: 860
- Burials: 2,120
- Secularized: 1834
- Returned to the Church: 1859
- Governing body: California Department of Parks and Recreation; Diocese of Monterey
- Current use: Santa Cruz Mission Adobe museum; Parish chapel

U.S. National Register of Historic Places
- Reference no.: #75000484

California Historical Landmark
- Reference no.: #342

Website
- www.parks.ca.gov?page_id=548
- Mission Hill Area Historic District
- U.S. National Register of Historic Places
- U.S. Historic district
- Location within California
- Location: Mission Street
- Coordinates: 36°58′39″N 122°1′43″W
- Area: 38 acres (15 ha)
- Architectural style: Spanish Colonial, Stick-Eastlake-Queen Anne—Victorian
- NRHP reference No.: 76000530
- Added to NRHP: May 17, 1976

Mission Santa Cruz (Spanish: La Misión de la Exaltación de la Santa Cruz, lit. The Mission of the Exaltation of the Holy Cross) is a replica Spanish Californian mission in Santa Cruz, California. Located on the San Lorenzo River floodplain below what would later be named Mission Hill, the mission was founded on August 28, 1791, by Father Fermín Francisco de Lasuén, the successor to Father Junipero Serra. The mission was dedicated that same year but, in the winter rainy season, the river overflowed its banks and flooded the mission compound. The mission was then relocated to the top of Mission Hill.

After earthquake damage and years of neglect, this second mission fell into disrepair, and much of it, though not all, was removed to accommodate the construction of the Holy Cross Church in 1889. A scaled-down replica was constructed in the 1930s, which today functions as a historical monument and chapel for the parish.

Near the replica chapel stands the one surviving Mission Santa Cruz Mission building, an adobe structure built between 1822 and 1824. This adobe building served as housing for Indigenous families who, after being converted to Catholicism, lived and worked at the Mission. It is the oldest surviving structure in Santa Cruz County and the best preserved Native American residence at any of the Alta California missions. It is now part of Santa Cruz Mission State Historic Park.

== History ==
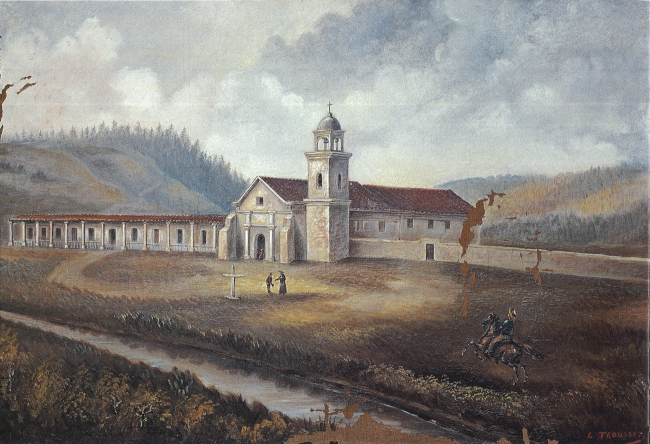
Mission Santa Cruz, 1876

The outpost was originally established near the Uypi village of Aulintak, located near the mouth of the San Lorenzo River, on August 28, 1791. There the Franciscan brothers erected a tent for worship to bring Christianity to the Awaswas people. The settlement was named for the feast of the Exaltation of the Cross, adopting the name given to a nearby creek by the missionary priest Juan Crespi, who accompanied the explorer Gaspar de Portolá when he camped on the San Lorenzo River on October 17, 1769.

The original mission was a small structure dedicated on September 25, 1791. It was located on the bottom of what would become Mission Hill, near what is today the intersection of River and North Pacific Streets, on the San Lorenzo River's flood plains. The mission was flooded as the river swelled with the rains that winter. Over the next three years until 1793, the padres rebuilt the mission on the hill overlooking the river.

As with the other California missions, Mission Santa Cruz served as a site for ecclesiastical conversion of natives, first the Amah Mutsun people, the original inhabitants of the region (called Costeño by the Spaniards, and later known as the "Ohlone"). Later, Yokuts people were brought from the east. The settlement was the site of the first autopsy in Alta California.

It was one of the smaller missions, in the fourth military district under protection of the Presidio of San Francisco.

In 1797, the secular pueblo (town) of Branciforte was founded across the San Lorenzo River to the east of Mission Santa Cruz. The mission padres did not welcome the location of the pueblo so close to the mission, and accused the Branciforte settlers of gambling, smuggling and tempting the native acolytes to desert the mission.

On October 12, 1812, Father Andrés Quintana was strangled to death by mission neophytes, angry over his use of a metal-tipped whip in the punishment of laborers, Native Americans, and Native children.

In 1818, the Mission received advance warning of an attack by the Argentine corsair (simply a pirate, from the Spanish point of view) Hipólito Bouchard and was evacuated. The citizens of Branciforte, several of whom were retired soldiers, were asked to protect the Mission's valuables; instead, they were later accused (by the priests) of stealing. The people from the mission then decided to flee the mission, and they later arrived in a new mission.

One of the only surviving first-person descriptions by a native Californian of life in a mission was given in an interview by Lorenzo Asisara in 1877. Asisara was born at Mission Santa Cruz in 1819. His father was one of the neophytes involved in the Quintana killing, and Asisara repeated the story his father had told him about those events.

== Decline ==
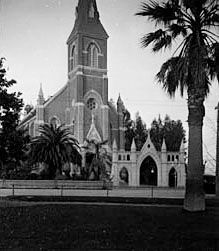
Holy Cross Church (c. 1900)

The front wall of the adobe mission, built in 1794, was destroyed by the 1857 Fort Tejon earthquake. A wooden facade was added and the structure converted to other uses. A new wooden church was built next door in 1858. In 1889, the current Gothic Revival-style Holy Cross Church was built over (in the same orientation) part of the original sanctuary and cemetery. The cemetery wall was defined in 1993 and developed as a memorial and native plant garden.

The current Holy Cross Church was built on the site of the original mission church in 1889, and it remains an active parish of the Diocese of Monterey. A section of stone foundation wall from one of the mission buildings and a few old headstones from the mission cemetery can be found directly behind the present Holy Cross Church. A reduced-scale "replica" chapel was built near the mission site in the 1930s and functions as a chapel of Holy Cross Church. Today's Plaza Park occupies the same location as the original plaza, at the center of the former mission complex. The complex at one time included as many as 32 buildings. The only surviving mission building, a dormitory for native acolytes, has been restored to its original appearance and functions as a museum of the Santa Cruz Mission State Historic Park.

At the same time, the mission cemetery was excavated and the remains moved to a mass grave at Old Holy Cross Cemetery, a few miles to the east. In recent years, a group of local volunteers worked to restore the old cemetery, and to identify the mission gravesite and those whose remains were moved there. A memorial was dedicated in 2016.

The only original Mission building left is a long multi-room building which at one time housed local Yokuts and Ohlone Native American families. The original building is located at 144 School Street and can be toured during operating hours. There is also a protected remnant of the mission church foundation wall behind the current Holy Cross Church. The parish address is 126 High Street. The road leading to the mission from the west is called Mission Street, which is also part of California State Route 1.

In 1931, Gladys Sullivan Doyle proposed to construct a reduced-size replica of the original chapel. She contributed all of the construction costs, on the condition that she be allowed to be buried inside. Her grave can be viewed in a small side room. Since there were no surviving photographs or drawings of the original structure, design of the replica chapel was adapted from an 1876 (19 years after the collapse of the building's front half) painting by the French painter Léon Trousset. The original painting hangs in the nave of the chapel.

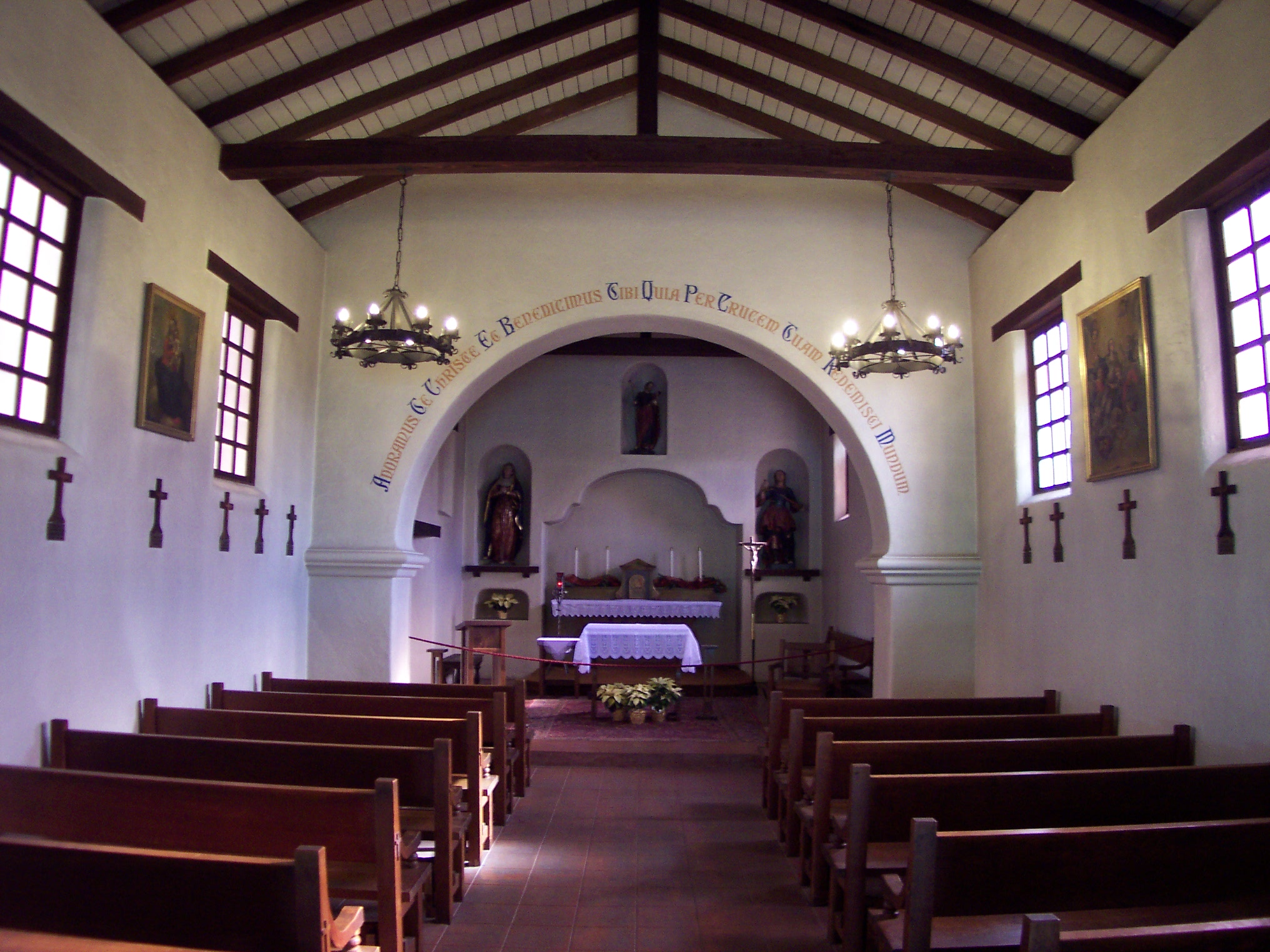
Inside the mission chapel replica

The concrete construction was done by parishioner Tranquilino Costella, an Italian immigrant, whose contractor stamp is still seen in the sidewalk in front of the mission. The small replica chapel is mainly used for private services, daily Masses (M-F), and Morning Prayer on Saturday. An adjoining room functions as a gift shop. A stone fountain from the original mission complex stands in the garden behind the gift shop.

== Santa Cruz Mission Historic Park and District ==
The only surviving original adobe mission building, a dormitory for Native American residents, has been restored as part of the Santa Cruz Mission State Historic Park as the Neary-Rodriguez Adobe. The Santa Cruz Mission is designated California Historical Landmark number 342. The Neary-Rodriguez Adobe was added to the National Register of Historic Places listings in Santa Cruz County, California as site number 75000484 on February 24, 1975, and the Mission Hill Area as a United States Historic District as site number 76000530 on May 17, 1976.

== Unidentified adobe foundations ==
The stone foundations of an unidentified adobe on the east edge of Mission Hill in Santa Cruz was first discovered in 1978. Prior to any excavations an extensive archival research program was carried out. After no mention was found in the written record, the foundations were given the name the "Lost Adobe". Archaeological excavations (from 1981 to 1984) indicated the presence of 18+ rooms structural foundations extending west toward the original church and cemetery. Artifacts found were a diverse collection of Spanish Mission Era/ Mexican Republic materials including glass beads, Majolica ceramic fragments and phoenix buttons. These findings suggest that the structure was used to house the neophyte community of Yokuts and Ohlone families living at the Mission in the 1820s and 1830s. The Lost Adobe collapsed during the 19th century and no remnants remain. The area is on private property and visitors are not allowed.

== Mission Hill train tunnel ==
Mission Santa Cruz has a hidden single track gated railroad tunnel running under it. Railroad train service used to connect Oakland to Santa Cruz with a train going down the middle of Pacific Avenue on the way to the wharf. In 1876 South Pacific Coast Railroad built a railroad tunnel under Mission Santa Cruz to reroute train traffic out of the busy downtown corridor. The entrance can be found at the end of Amat Street with the tunnel going under the church's parking lot and Emmett Street, and emerging at Chestnut Street. This is still an active rail line for Santa Cruz, Big Trees and Pacific Railway connecting Santa Cruz with Felton.

== See also ==
- Spanish missions in California
- List of Spanish missions in California
- USNS Mission Santa Cruz (AO-133) – a Mission Buenaventura-class transport oiler built during World War II
