= Cathedral of San Carlos Borromeo (Monterey, California) =

Historic church in California, United States

- Royal Presidio Chapel
- U.S. National Register of Historic Places
- U.S. National Historic Landmark
- California Historical Landmark
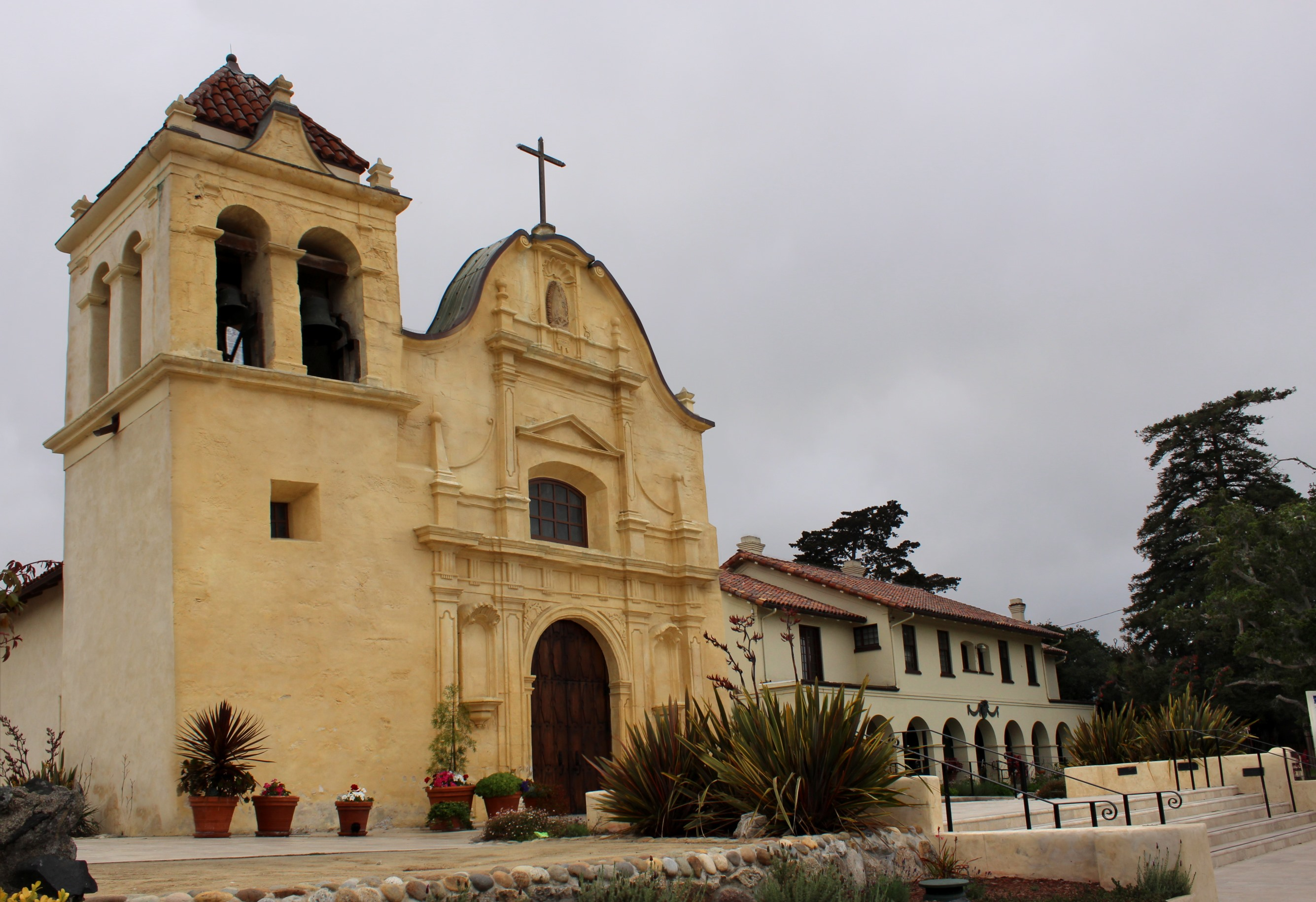
- The Cathedral of San Carlos Borromeo from the northeast

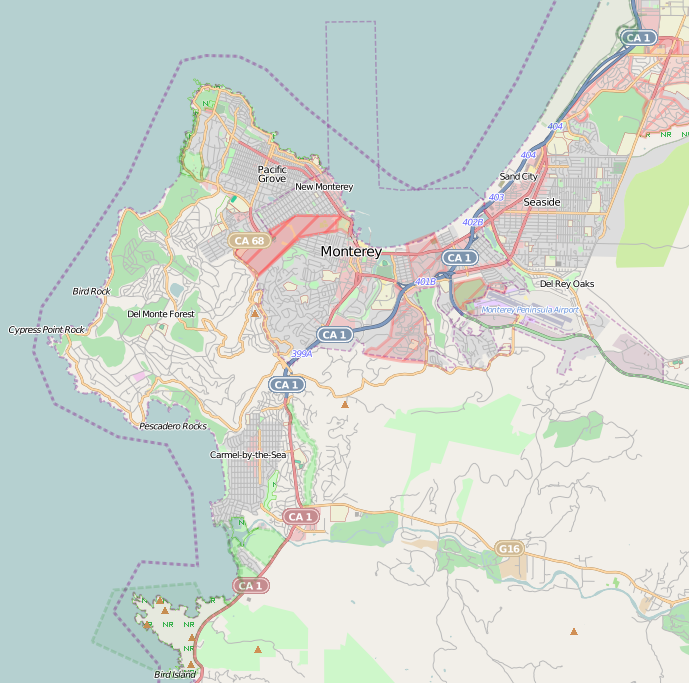
- Location within Monterey Peninsula
- Location: 550 Church Street, Monterey, California
- Coordinates: 36°35′44″N 121°53′25.5″W
- Area: 0.5 acres (0.20 ha)
- Built: 1791-1794
- Architectural style: Spanish Colonial
- NRHP reference No.: 66000216
- CHISL No.: 105

Significant dates
- Added to NRHP: October 15, 1966
- Designated NHL: October 9, 1960
- Designated CHISL: 1933

The Cathedral of San Carlos Borromeo (Spanish: Catedral de San Carlos Borromeo), also known as the Royal Presidio Chapel, is a Catholic cathedral located in Monterey, California, United States. The cathedral is the oldest continuously operating parish and the oldest stone building in California. It was built in 1791-94 making it the oldest (and smallest) serving cathedral in the United States, along with St. Louis Cathedral in New Orleans, Louisiana. It is the only existing presidio chapel in California and the only existing building in the original Monterey Presidio.

== Early history ==
The church was founded by the Franciscan Saint Junípero Serra as the chapel of Mission San Carlos Borromeo de Carmelo on June 3, 1770. Father Serra first established the original mission in Monterey at this location on June 3, 1770, near the native village of Tamo. However, Father Serra became engaged in a heated power struggle with Military Governor Pedro Fages, who was headquartered at the Presidio of Monterey and served as governor of Alta California between 1770 and 1774. Serra decided to move the mission away from the Presidio, and in May, 1771, the Spanish viceroy approved Serra's petition to relocate the mission to its current location near the mouth of the Carmel River and the present-day town of Carmel-by-the-Sea, California.

When the mission was moved, the existing wood and adobe building became the San Jose Chapel for the Presidio of Monterey. Monterey became the capital of the Province of Californias in 1777 and the chapel was renamed the Royal Presidio Chapel. The original 1770-71 church along with other buildings in the presido were destroyed by fire caused by a salute gun in 1789 and was replaced by the present sandstone structure built between 1791 and 1795. It was completed in 1794 by master mason Manuel Ruiz of Spain and Indian labor. In 1840, the chapel was rededicated to the patronage of Saint Charles Borromeo.

In 1849, the chapel was selected to be the Pro-Cathedral of the Diocese of Monterey by Bishop Joseph Alemany. After Alemany became Archbishop of San Francisco, his successor Thaddeus Amat y Brusi moved the cathedral to Mission Santa Barbara, to be closer to the population in Los Angeles.

== Hoover marriage ==
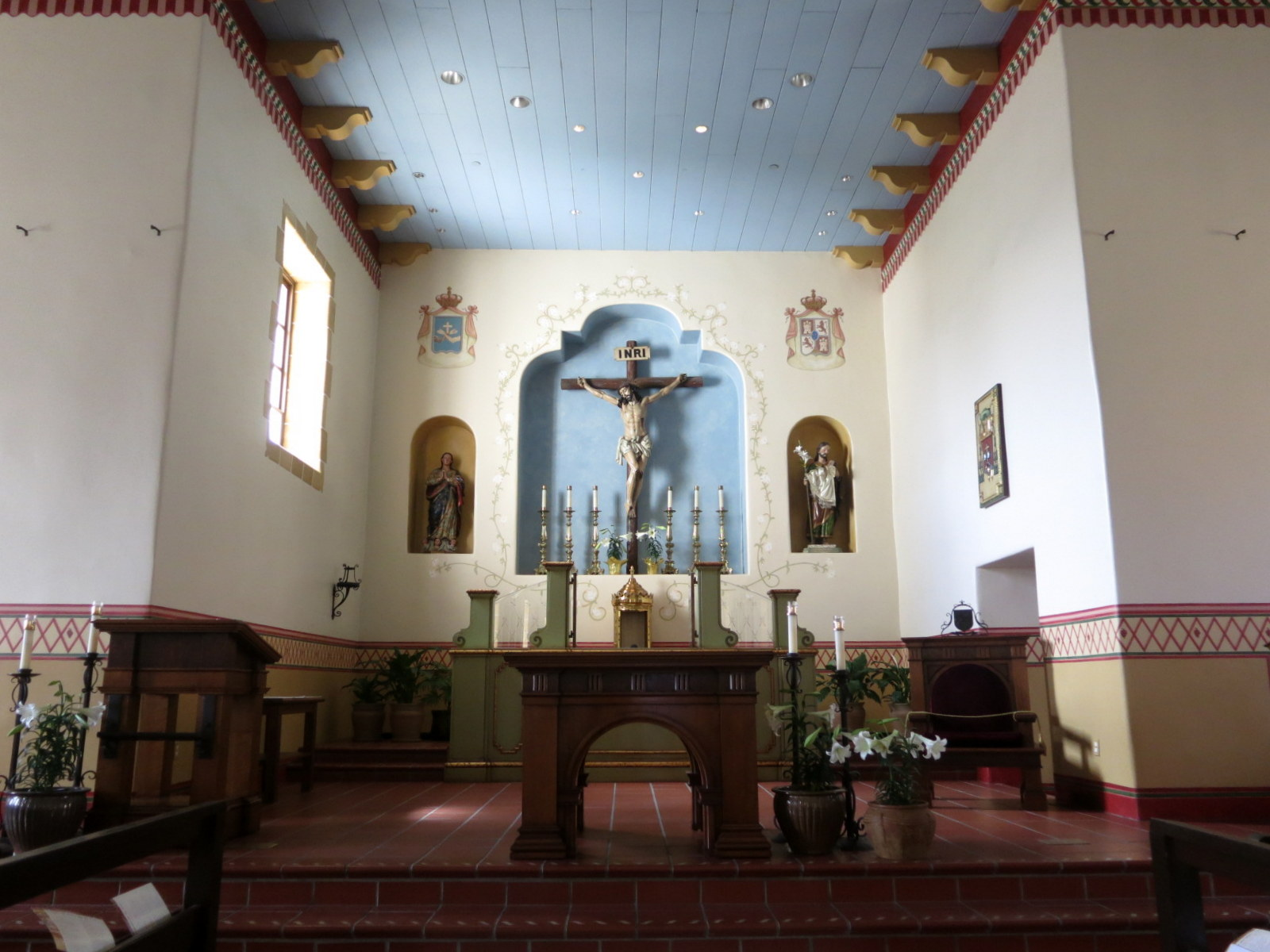
The cathedral sanctuary as seen on Holy Saturday in 2013.

Future President of the United States Herbert Hoover and Lou Henry were married February 10, 1899 by Father Ramon Mestres who was serving at the chapel; Hoover was the first President to be married by a Catholic priest. The wedding took place not at the chapel, but in the Henry home. Father Mestres had received special dispensation from the bishop to perform the civil ceremony because there was no Protestant minister in town at the time.

== Architecture ==
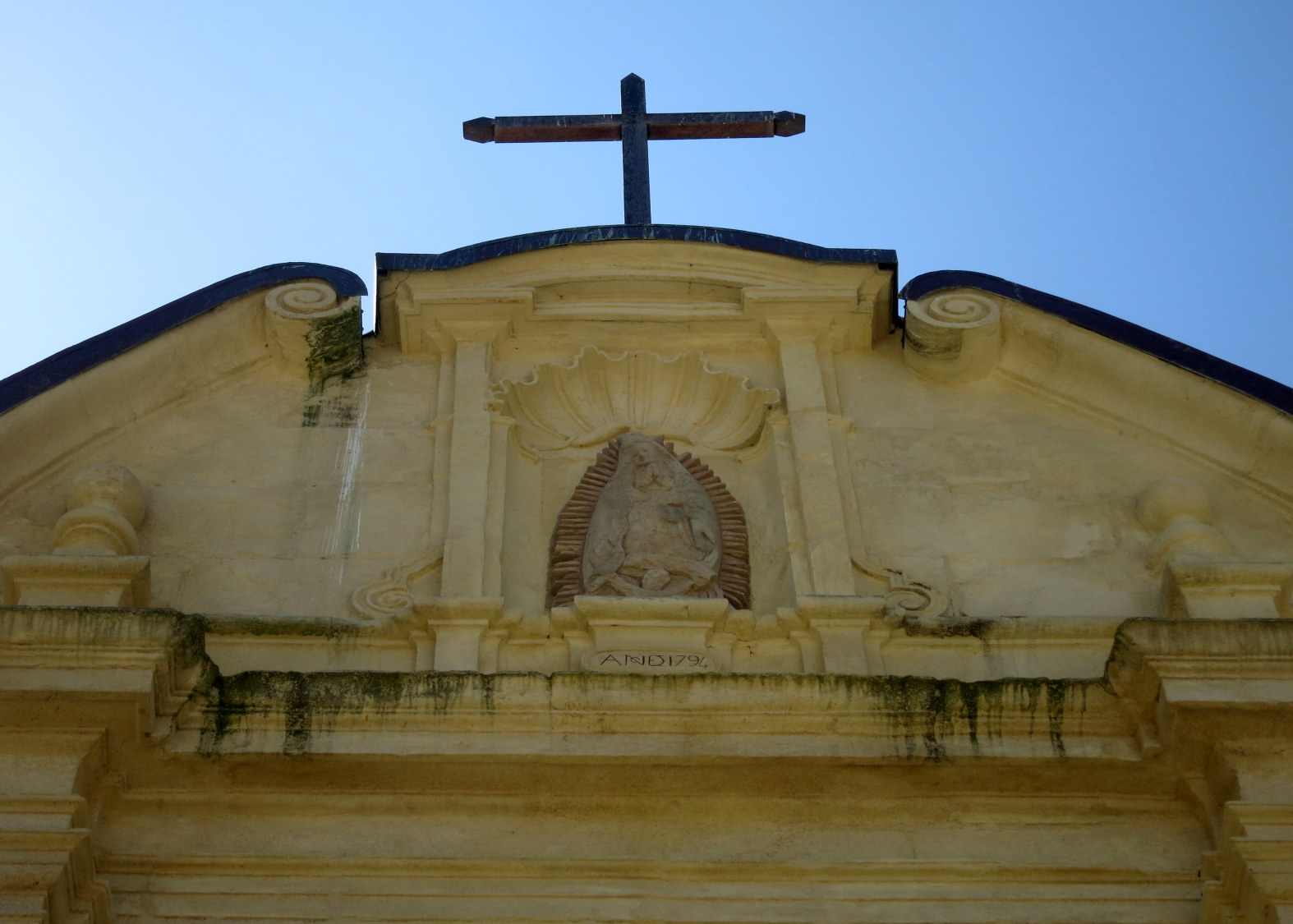
Statue of Our Lady of Guadalupe atop the cathedral façade.

The Royal Presidio Chapel is the first stone building in California and reflects the exquisite Spanish Colonial style of the late 18th century. The Moorish architecture influence is also evident in the fine architecture. The ornamental arches and portals carved in sandstone make the church unique and arguably the most beautiful of all the Missions. A garden surrounds the gated Mission, with a path leading all the way round and to both San Carlos School and the Rectory of San Carlos Cathedral. To the right of the Cathedral lies a statue of the Virgin Mary with an arch beneath. At the rear of the building is the Junipero Oak, a California landmark. There is a bell tower to announce Mass and in the niche at the very top of the façade there is a statue of Our Lady of Guadalupe, the oldest non-indigenous sculpture in the state.

== Associated landmarks and buildings ==
- The Vizcaíno-Serra Oak. The preserved remains of the tree which is closely associated with the early history of Monterey once stood in the grounds of the cathedral.
- San Carlos School. The school is located on the grounds of the cathedral and was established in 1898 by the Sisters of Saint Joseph of Carondolet. It was later run by the Franciscan Sisters of the Immaculate Conception. Since 2001, it has been run as a ministry of San Carlos Cathedral with a lay principal and faculty.

== Historic designations ==
In 1960, the chapel was listed on the National Register of Historic Places #NPS-66000216 as a National Historic Landmark by the National Park Service. The chapel again became the cathedral of the Diocese of Monterey when the Diocese of Monterey-Fresno was split in 1967 to form the Monterey and Fresno dioceses. The cathedral is the smallest in the contiguous United States, and one of the two oldest buildings serving as a cathedral in the United States (St. Louis Cathedral in New Orleans, Louisiana was also completed in 1794).

- California Historical Landmark #105 — Royal Presidio Chapel
- California Historical Landmark #128 — Landing Place of Sebastian Vizcaíno and Fray Junípero Serra

== Restoration ==
A Historic Structure Report was completed in 1999. It documented the history, current condition and action needed to conserve the chapel.

Funding for restoration was provided by The Getty Foundation, The California Missions Foundation, The Walker Foundation, the Community Foundation of Monterey County, and private donations.

In May 2007 a concrete apron that had prevented evaporation of moisture within the exterior walls was removed. To divert water away from the sandstone walls, a French drain was constructed around the entire perimeter of the building. The roof was removed to repair termite damage and to install the attic portion of the engineering retrofit.

Workers removed the plaster covering the original stone walls. They found that the nave walls, built in 1794, were in much better condition than the transepts and apse which were added in 1858. About 80% of the southern-facing rear walls of the church were replaced with 100 tons of new stone and lime mortar.

Seismic retrofit included tying the interior and exterior walls together. The exterior walls were reinforced by drilling vertical holes in the walls and inserting steel bars.

Restorers also discovered that the interior of the church had been decorated much more richly than previously believed.

== See also ==
- List of Catholic cathedrals in the United States
- List of cathedrals in the United States
- Former California State Capitol sites
