= Lost Adobe =

Location at Mission Santa Cruz

The Lost Adobe is a location at Mission Santa Cruz in Santa Cruz, California. The stone foundations of an unidentified adobe on the east edge of Mission Hill in Santa Cruz was first discovered in 1978. Prior to any excavations an extensive archival research program was carried out. After no mention was found in the written record, the foundations were given the name the Lost Adobe. Archaeological excavations (from 1981 to 1984) indicated the presence of 18+ rooms' structural foundations extending west toward the original church and cemetery. Artifacts found were a diverse collection of Spanish Mission Era/ Mexican Republic materials including glass beads, Majolica ceramic fragments and phoenix buttons. These findings suggest that the structure was used to house the neophyte community of Yokuts and Ohlone families living at the Santa Cruz Mission in the 1820s and 1830s. The "Lost Adobe" collapsed during the 19th century, and no remnants remain. The area is on private property and visitors are not allowed.

== Discovery ==
The stone foundations were first found on Adobe Court. The foundations turned out to be of a structure composed of a long series of adobe rooms, similar to and roughly parallel to the Santa Cruz Mission State Historic Park Adobe: an adobe that was built for the use of the neophytes of the church. The unidentified foundations on Adobe Court angled more toward the original Mission Church site under the present day Holy Cross Church and graveyard.

Ruby Tefertiller, the next-door neighbor to the west of the site, and her son Casey, had earlier found an area where Mission Era roof tiles were located on their property. Concerned about the "loss" of historic data Ruby and Jim Tefertiller invited the Cabrillo College Archaeological Program (directed by Rob Edwards) to investigate what was on their property, from 1981 to 1984.

== Excavation ==
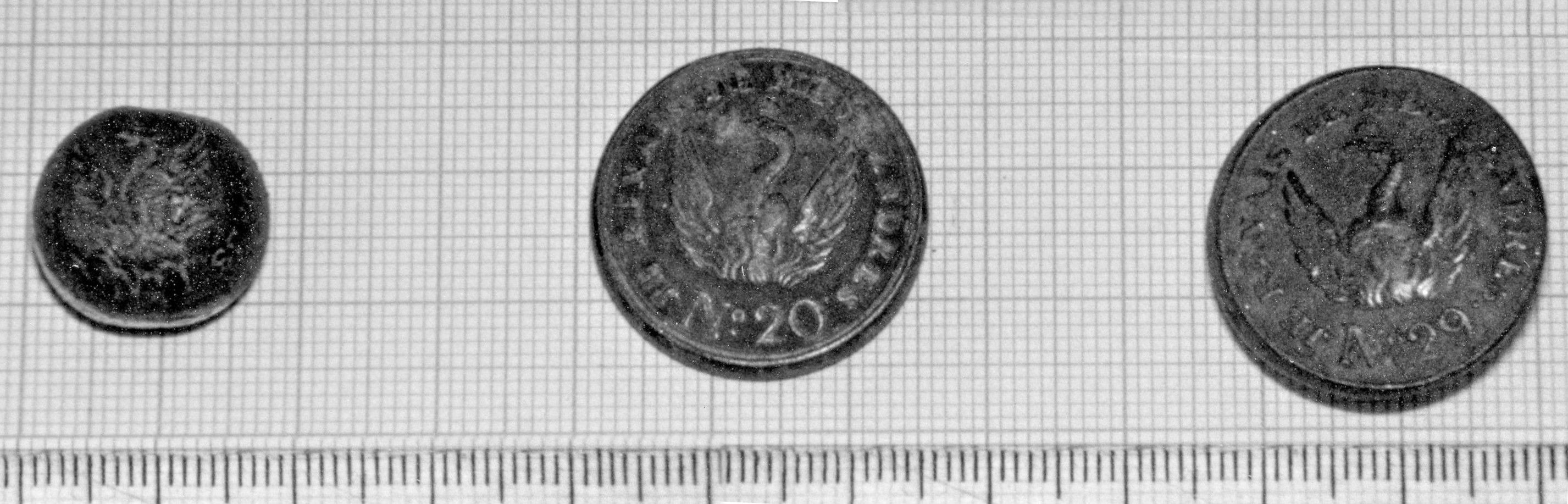
Phoenix Buttons from Santa Cruz Mission Lost Adobe (1985).

During the excavations, artifacts found within the adobe rooms were a diverse collection of Spanish Mission and Mexican Republic periods. The artifacts included native style lithic artifacts (of obsidian and chert) including "side notch" arrow points, scrapers and ground stone tools. Adobe construction materials were plentiful, including fired roof tiles, unfired floor tile and adobe wall bricks. Many small glass beads, Majolica ceramic fragments, copper artifacts, a roughly made unfired clay "doll’ and a number of phoenix buttons were also found. These findings suggest that the structure was used to house the neophyte community of Yokuts and Ohlone living at Mission Santa Cruz.

== Possible identification and purpose ==
The results of the Field Excavations indicated the presence of long series of foundations, composed of at least eighteen rooms (similar to the Standing Adobe on School Street) but extending potentially beyond the Tefertiller property onto Church property to the west with enough room for possibly 10 or 11 rooms additionally.

Torchiana in "Story of the Mission Santa Cruz" mentions (without a source) "between the two rows of adobe houses ran a diverted stream". The 1835 Secularization Inventory mentions a 17-room adobe consistent with what is believed to be the School Street Adobe dimensions (now Santa Cruz Mission Historic State Park). The 1835 Secularization Inventory also has a mention (but not a location) of a structure of 29 rooms said to be just under 600 feet. While these historical descriptions are consistent with the 29-room structure of the "Lost Adobe" it cannot be said with certainly that the "Lost Adobe" has been found.
