= Minnie Coyle =

First female mayor of Monterey, California

Mayor of Monterey
- In office 1965–1969
- Preceded by: Shedo "Buck" S. Russo
- Succeeded by: Al J. Madden

Personal details
- Born: December 12, 1915 Chicago, Illinois
- Died: June 20, 1976 (aged 60) Monterey, California

Minnie Denah Coyle was the first female mayor of the city of Monterey, California, serving from 1965 to 1969. As of September 2026, no other female has been elected to that office. She was mayor of Monterey during the construction of Lighthouse Tunnel, the only road tunnel in the Monterey Peninsula, and locals nicknamed it "Minnie's Ditch." Because she was mayor of the city during the era of urban renewal, much of the landscape of the peninsula was forever altered. To some historians, no other mayor of Monterey has done more to change the shape of the city. On the night of February 5, 1966, an effigy of Coyle was hanged from a telephone pole in front of a house that had been demolished. She also served as mayor during the Monterey International Pop Festival, which ran headliners like Jimi Hendrix, and led a series of campaigns against the return of the festival for a second year.
