= Lighthouse Tunnel =

Cut-and-cover road tunnel in Monterey, California

- North entrance, underneath the offices of the National Oceanic and Atmospheric Administration South entrance, underneath the Stanton Center

Overview
- Other name: Custom House Tunnel
- Location: Monterey, California
- Route: Lighthouse Avenue
- Start: 36.6046°N 121.8948°W
- End: 36.6022°N 121.8933°W

Operation
- Constructed: January 10, 1967
- Opened: April 5, 1968

Technical
- No. of lanes: 4

Lighthouse Tunnel, also known as Lighthouse Avenue Tunnel, or Custom House Tunnel, is the only vehicular road tunnel in the Monterey Peninsula. It was constructed as a cut-and-cover tunnel, and displaced over 100 downtown businesses and homes during its construction. It runs along Lighthouse Avenue, directly underneath the Stanton Center and Custom House Plaza, which is bounded by Old Custom House and the Pacific House Museum, and it exits near the National Oceanic and Atmospheric Administration offices. The mayor of Monterey at the time of its construction was Minnie Coyle, and locals called the tunnel at the time Minnie's Ditch, upset at the era of urban renewal. This tunnel is part of the main thoroughfare from Seaside to New Monterey. People moving to the area or visiting are often confused why drivers honk in the tunnel, which has been a tradition since its construction. The federal government allocated $11 million (equivalent to 81 million in 2024) for the project in 1966. Mayor Coyle dedicated the tunnel on April 5, 1968. The tunnel is part of the route of the Monterey Bay Half Marathon, one of the only parts of the year where pedestirans are allowed to enter.
