= Léon Trousset =

French artist (1838–1917)

Léon Trousset (c. 1838 – 29 December 1917) was a French artist who began as an itinerant painter in Northern California where he produced landscapes and architectural and historical scenes. He later lived and worked in Texas, New Mexico, and Northern Mexico where he eventually settled. Among the museums holding his works are the El Paso Museum of Art, the Smithsonian American Art Museum, and the Amon Carter Museum of American Art.
