= Spaghetti Hill =

Neighborhood of Monterey, California

- Neighborhood
- Old Town
- Looking westward up Franklin Street from Pierce Street.
- Boundaries of Spaghetti Hill (Old Town)
- Official neighborhood boundaries of Monterey adopted in 2021.

Government
  - Body: Old Town Neighborhood Association
- Postal code: 93940

Spaghetti Hill, officially known as Old Town, is a neighborhood of Monterey, California, that was affectionately named after the abundance of Italian Americans who lived in the area, and the spaghetti found in several of the restaurants that used to be in the area. The neighborhood is also occasionally known as The Presidents, after the fact that so many roads in the neighborhood are named after dead presidents; Jefferson, Van Buren, and others. This neighborhood has lost many of its original Italian families, and the residential portion has shrunk in size, but the boundaries remain roughly the same. Part of the neighborhood is now occupied by the Monterey Institute of International Studies.

== Hunukul ==
The original inhabitants of Monterey Peninsula, the Rumsen Ohlone, called the hill Hunukul, meaning either "hill with a fort," or "fort on a hill."

== Spaghetti Hill ==
According to local tradition, the first group of Italian immigrants to the Monterey area arrived as professional working fishermen and canners in 1875, joining a community of Chinese fishermen at the waterfront who had been in the area since 1855. The fish they caught at the water would then be shipped throughout California via the Salinas Valley Railroad. However, census data from the time shows that this might not have been possible; in the 1880 Monterey census, there were only two families of Italians in Monterey, and they identified as Swiss Italian, and they weren't fishermen. Within a short time, however, there were pockets of Genoans and Sicilians working and fishing the docks, the first major group of Sicilians arriving between 1890 and 1915. The Italian fishermen on the waterfront were especially stratified along ethnic lines, with the Sicilians sitting at the top of the social hierarchy. The Genoan communities there were not afforded some of the basic rights of a community, such as the right to march in the Santa Rosalia parade to bless fish.

Different areas of Italy and Sicily had different foods, languages, music, and culture, and when Italians moved to Monterey, the spheres of Italian districts in the area were centralized around the cities they had originated from back home.

The movement into Spaghetti Hill, which at that time was "virgin" land, was made by the Sicilians sometime at end of the 19th or into the beginning of the 20th Century. The hierarchy of stratification was made physical; the "higher" someone was on the social ladder, the higher in elevation their home was on the hill, as the smell of rotting fish was worse the closer you were to the water.
