= E. Charlton Fortune =

American painter (1885–1969)

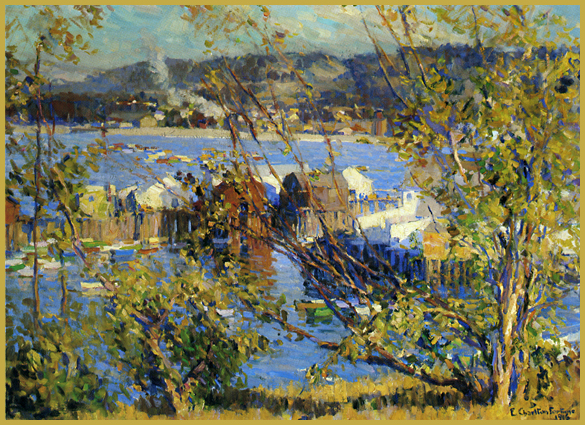
- Monterey Bay, 1916, 30 x 40 inches, Oakland Museum of California
- Born: Euphemia Charlton Fortune; January 15, 1885; Sausalito, California
- Died: May 15, 1969; Carmel, California
- Known for: oil painting
- Movement: American Impressionism

Euphemia Charlton Fortune (January 15, 1885 – May 15, 1969) was an American Impressionist artist from California. She was trained in Europe, New York and San Francisco. She painted many portraits as well as landscape views of California and European sites. In midlife she turned to liturgical design. She signed her paintings "E. Charlton Fortune," which helped conceal her gender.

== Early life and education ==
Fortune was born in Sausalito, Marin County, California, on January 15, 1885. Her father was a Scot, William Ranken Fortune, and her mother was a native of San Francisco, Helen Herzberg. Helen Herzberg, was the daughter of Mary Charlton and Julius Herzberg. Mary Ann Charlton was born in Nova Scotia, while Julius Herzberg was a German Jewish immigrant from Hamburg. After meeting Mary Ann Charlton in Nova Scotia, Julius immigrated with her to San Francisco in the 1850s, where the family became part of the city’s thriving early immigrant community. She eschewed her given name Euphemia, and was known to friends as Effie. Having a cleft palate, as did her father, Effie resolved to never marry, lest the trait be passed on. She came from a wealthy family and was able to travel widely throughout her life.

Her father developed lung disease by 1890, prompting the family to move to Southern California in 1891. The father died in 1894. In 1898 an aunt visited from Scotland and took Effie back with her, where she enrolled in St. Margaret's Convent in Edinburgh. She graduated in 1904 and went to London, where she studied at St John's Wood School of Art.

In 1905, she returned to San Francisco, where she studied at the Mark Hopkins Institute of Art, then directed by Arthur Frank Mathews.

The 1906 San Francisco earthquake destroyed the Fortune family's home, virtually all of Effie's paintings, and the Mark Hopkins Institute of Art. The following year the family relocated to New York City, where she studied at the Art Students League until 1910. Frank Vincent DuMond was a favorite teacher from whom she learned the importance of expressing her own individuality and the importance of light effects. From the South American F. Luis Mora she learned the skills of an illustrator. Fortune often painted at Lake George with DuMond. As she sought out further outdoor venues, she was invited by Spencer Trask to paint at Woodstock in the Catskill Mountains. She was elected women's vice president of the Art Student's League and contributed some illustrations to Harpers Magazine. She also studied with William Merritt Chase in her last year at the Art Students League.

During 1910, she traveled to Scotland, England and France. Upon visiting her alma mater in Edinburgh, she was commissioned to paint three panels of the life of Christ for St. Margaret's Convent. She also received her first professional exhibition at the Royal Scottish Academy in Edinburgh, exhibiting 27 paintings there in 1911.

== Early career in California ==
In 1910, after a trip to Paris where she was exposed to modern French art, Fortune re-emerged in San Francisco. Through the help of Luis Mora, she gained a position as an illustrator for Sunset Magazine. From 1913 through 1920, she and her mother spent summers in Monterey. In 1914 William Merritt Chase taught a summer painting class in nearby Carmel; Fortune took credit for having invited him, although the collected documentary evidence shows that the artist Jennie V. Cannon and co-founder of Carmel Frank Devendorf were responsible for inviting Chase. Between 1916 and 1920 she taught private art lessons and organized outdoor painting workshops. She was also active in the San Francisco art community: She exhibited ten portraits at Vickery, Atkins and Torrey in 1913 and had solo shows at Schussler Galleries in 1914 and Helgesen Galleries in 1918. In 1915 she received silver medals at both the Panama Pacific International Exposition and the Panama–California Exposition. In 1920 she was nominated to the National Academy of Design, sponsored by Luis Mora and William Ritschel, but she was not elected to the academy.

== Europe and then back to Monterey ==
Fortune, continuing to travel with her mother, visited Europe from 1921 to 1927. They lived in St Ives, Cornwall from 1922 to 1923, then spent time in St. Tropez and Italy. She exhibited in various European and American museums and galleries during these years, and in 1924 one of her paintings of Saint Ives Harbor received a silver medal at the Paris Salon. She was elected a member of the Society of Scottish Artists in 1922.

Upon returning to California in 1927 she settled in Monterey and joined the newly formed Carmel Art Association. She had a solo exhibition at the Galerie des Beaux Arts in San Francisco in October 1927, which received very negative reviews from two of the most prominent art critics in the Bay Area, Junius Cravens of The Argonaut and Jehanne Salinger of The Argus. However, at other venues, such as the Oakland Art Gallery, Los Angeles Art Museum and Carmel Art Association, her European paintings, which reflected a new Post-Impressionist approach, received rave reviews in the San Francisco Chronicle, Oakland Tribune, and Los Angeles Times.

== Religious art ==
About this time Fortune decided to focus on religious art, and in 1928 she co-established the firm of Fortune and Ryland for the purpose of making liturgical arts to adorn Roman Catholic Churches. Shortly thereafter she adopted the name Monterey Guild and accepted numerous commissions for ecclesiastical furnishings. She served as artist-in-residence at Portsmouth Priory (now Portsmouth Abbey School) in Portsmouth, Rhode Island, in 1947–48 and designed the tabernacle that now resides in the Abbey's Church of St. Gregory the Great. In 1955, she received the papal award Pro ecclesia et Pontiface for outstanding achievement in the field of liturgical art.

== Legacy ==
A play about Fortune, "Fortune's Way, or Notes on Art for Catholics (and Others)", by Steve Hauk, premiered in California in staged readings in 2010 at the Carmel Mission. The play featured Teresa Del Piero in the title role and John Brady as the Bishop. Performances followed at the Carl Cherry Center for the Arts, Carmel; the Monterey Museum of Art, the Pacific Grove Public Library and in the summer of 2011 it was performed at The Carmel Art Association. This performance is thought to be a first in the association's 84-year history. The play is set after the artist has turned to liturgical work and as she looks back at her life while giving a lecture. The full text of the play with photographs is on the Traditional Fine Arts Organization, Inc. website. Steve Hauk speaks about the life and art of artist E. Charlton Fortune. on a video for the Museum of Monterey's 100 Story Project.

Numerous Fortune paintings have sold in recent years in the five and seven digit ranges, including "Late Afternoon, Monterey" which sold for >$1,800,000, "The Señora's Garden" which sold for >$720,000, "Wash Day at St. Tropez" which sold for >$605,000, "Hall of Flowers" which sold for >$360,000. "Wharf, Monterey" which sold for >$725,000, "Untitled (Monterey)" which sold for >$785,000.

== Permanent collections ==
- Crocker Art Museum, Sacramento
- Fine Arts Museums of San Francisco
- Irvine Museum
- Monterey Museum of Art
- Oakland Museum of California
- Saint Mary's College Museum of Art

== Gallery ==
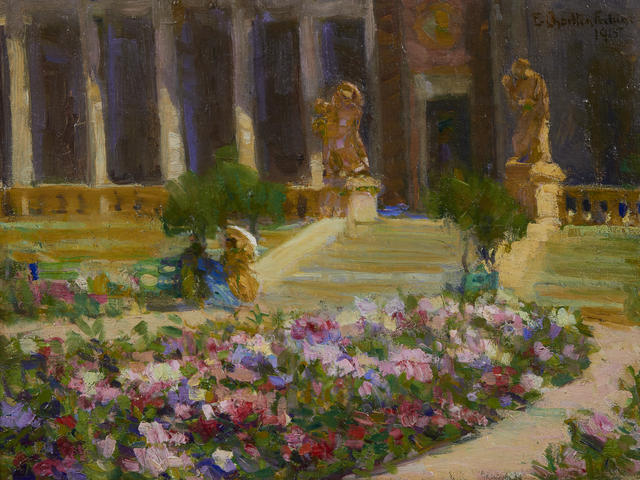
Hall of Flowers, Panama Pacific International Exposition, 1915, oil on canvas, 12 x 16 inches (Bonhams auction April 2014)

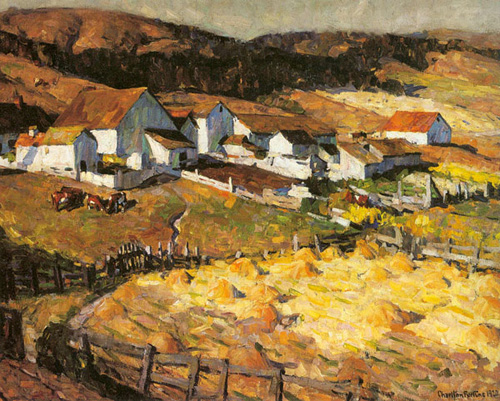
Hatton Ranch, 1920, oil on canvas, 38 x 48 inches (Monterey Museum of Art)

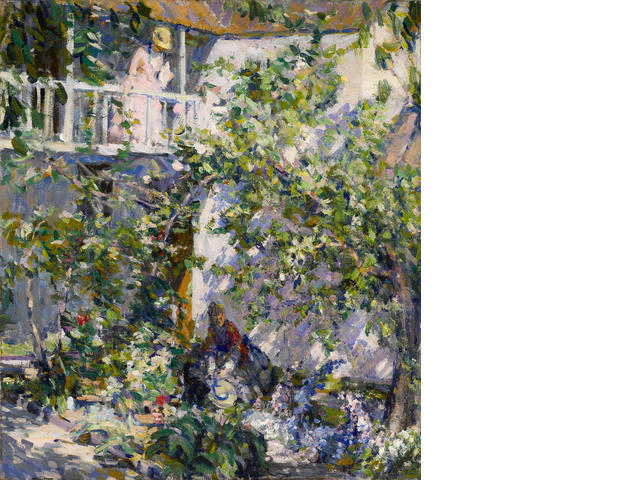
The Señora's Garden, ca. 1918, oil on canvas, 30 x 26 inches (Bonhams auction June 2011)
