= Allen Griffin =

Founder of the Monterey Herald (1893–1981)

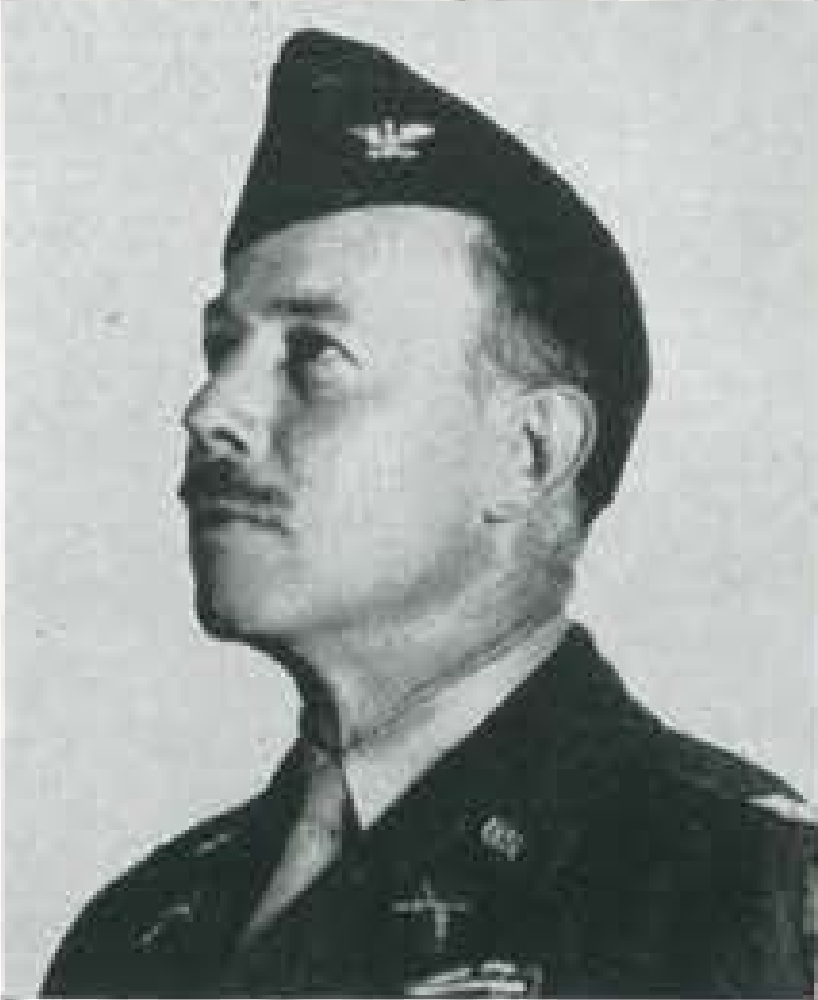

Special Representative of the Far East for the Economic Cooperation Administration and Mutual Security Agency
- In office 1951–1952
- Appointed by: Harry Truman

Director of the Economic Cooperation Administration Far East Program Division
- In office 1950–1951
- Appointed by: Harry Truman
- Preceded by: Harlan Cleveland

Chief of State Department Economic Mission to Southeast Asia
- In office 1950
- Appointed by: Harry Truman

Deputy Chief of Economic Cooperation Administration Mission to China
- In office 1949
- Appointed by: Harry Truman

1st Secretary to the Polish Minister to the United States
- In office 1919–1920
- Appointed by: Herbert Hoover

Personal details
- Born: September 27, 1893 Kansas City, Missouri, United States
- Died: July 19, 1981 (aged 87) Pebble Beach, California, United States
- Resting place: San Carlos Cemetery
- Party: Republican
- Spouses: Phyllis Hayes (m. 1917; div. 1935); Hester Hyde (m. 1935)
- Education: Stanford University; Occidental College
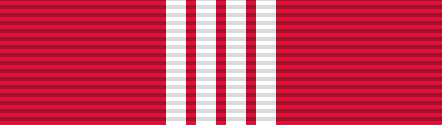
- Awards

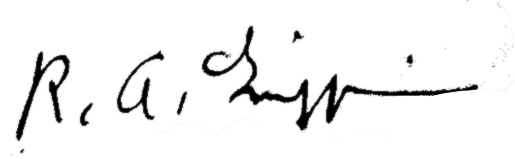
- Signature

Military service
- Branch/service: United States Army
- Rank: Colonel
- Commands: Company F, (364th Infantry Regiment, 91st Infantry Division); 13th Infantry Regiment
- Battles/wars: World War I; Meuse-Argonne Campaign; World War II; Normandy; Battle for Brest; Belgium; Cold War

Robert Allen Griffin was the creator and owner of the Monterey Peninsula Herald. His first wife also became a co-owner of the newspaper. Griffin purchased and owned the Carmel Pine Cone. He created KDON-FM. He was one of the founders of the Monterey History and Art Association, and served as one of its 15 directors. During World War I, he commanded Company F of the 364th Infantry Regiment. During World War II, he commanded the 13th Infantry Regiment in Europe. During the Cold War, he was appointed by Harry S. Truman to serve the president at the Economic Cooperation Administration for several years in Asia. He was involved in the creation of the Monterey Peninsula College, the first civilian postsecondary institution in the area. He was one of the 32 founders of the Community Foundation for Monterey County. He served as president, and later executive director, of the International Press Institute. He served on the board of the Monterey Community Hospital. He was an Episcopalian, and a member of Monterey's St. John's Episcopal Church.

== Early life and high school journalism ==
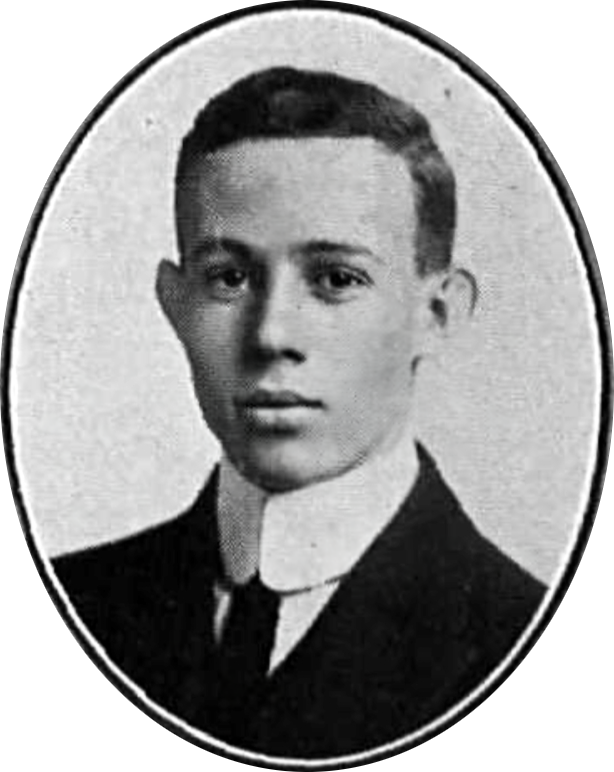
Allen Griffin in 1912, during his tenure as Managing editor of the Luminary.

Robert Allen Griffin was born in Kansas City, Missouri in 1893. His father was William Black, and his mother was Francesca Black. His father owned a hardware store and a wholesale plumbing supply company.

His experience in journalism began as a student at Central High School (CHS), where he was a student journalist for the school's student newspaper, the Luminary. In his junior year, he was Luminary's business manager, and also president of the Central Writers' Club (CWC). In his senior year, he was the newspaper's Managing editor, managing a newspaper staff of thirteen students. In the senior ballot published in the yearbook of his graduating class, his fellow students wrote that he was: "...going to Princeton, and [he] doesn't care who knows it."

When Griffin's father retired, the family moved to Edenvale, California.

=== Journalism at Stanford University ===
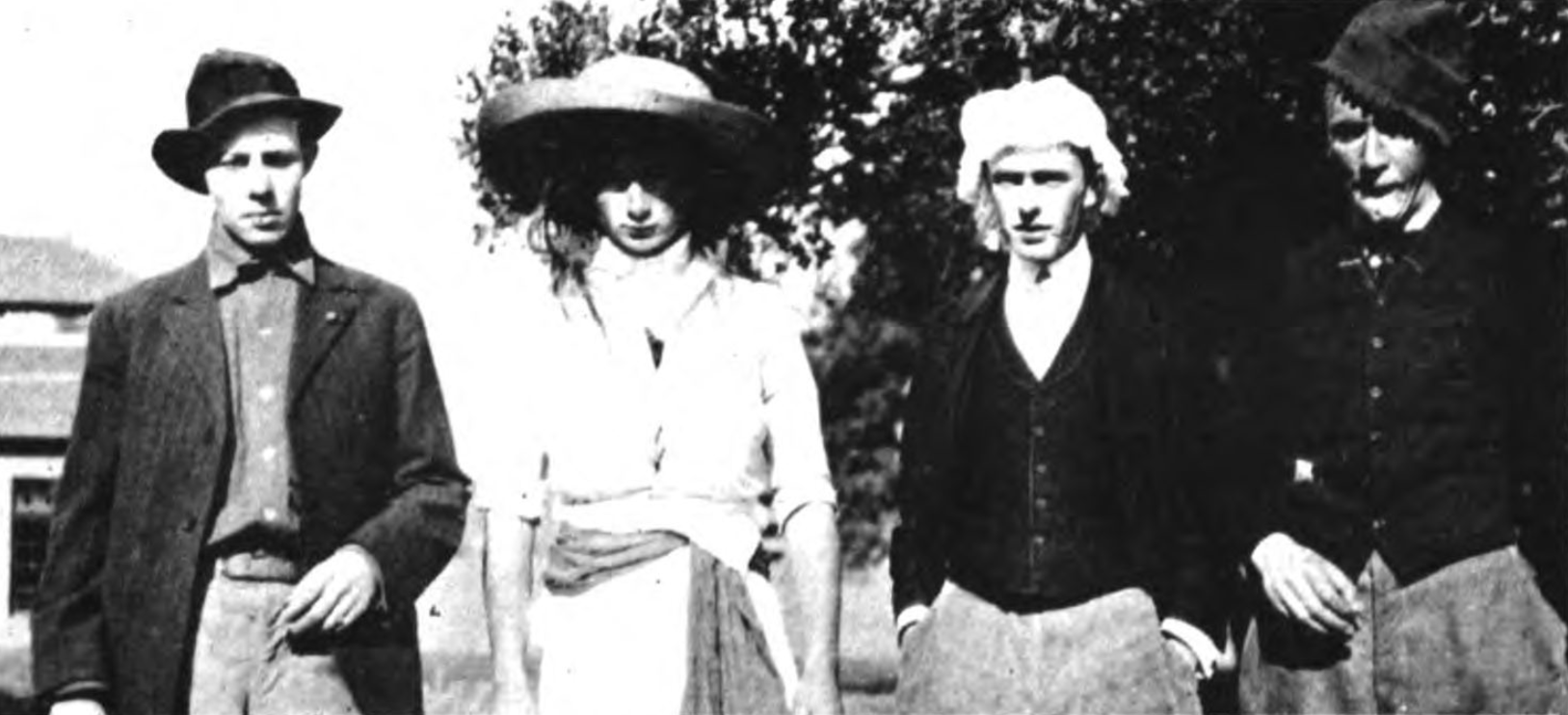
Stanford Press Club's Collection of 1917. From left to right: Allen Griffen, Frank Jacques Leard, Joseph Cameron Cross, L. W. McDermott.

In 1913, Griffin arrived at Stanford University, where he continued his student journalism career. He worked on the staff of the Sequoia, Stanford's literary magazine, where he had been contributing to the magazine for nearly two years by the time of his election to that position. In 1914, he wrote for the Sketch Book, one of Sequoia's sections. In 1915, he wrote the leading feature of the winter edition of Sequoia; a fictional story entitled Metamorphosis.

He also worked as an Associate Editor at The Chaparral, Stanford's humor magazine, for several years.

On January 5, 1915, Griffin was one of the 5 founding members of the Stanford chapter of Sigma Delta Chi, alongside Edwin Ford, Milton James Bennet, Harold Levy, and Glenn Hughes.

On January 26, 1915, he was elected Senior editor of The Stanford Quad, the campus yearbook. The Quad was only allowed to be staffed by juniors, and it called itself a "junior publication." His staff manager was H. L. Hews. His election to the position was called one of the closest races ever run for the Quad. Griffin received 102 votes, while his competitor, Collins, received just two votes less.

On November 9, 1915, Griffin was one of four members of The Collection, which were that year's initiates into the Stanford Press Club. The Stanford Press Club, founded in 1894, was an upperclassman honor society which initiated students at the end of their junior year, who had shown prior excellence in student journalism at Stanford. This club was designed to provide student journalists with networking opportunities in the industry.

==== Founding the Stanford Illustrated Review ====
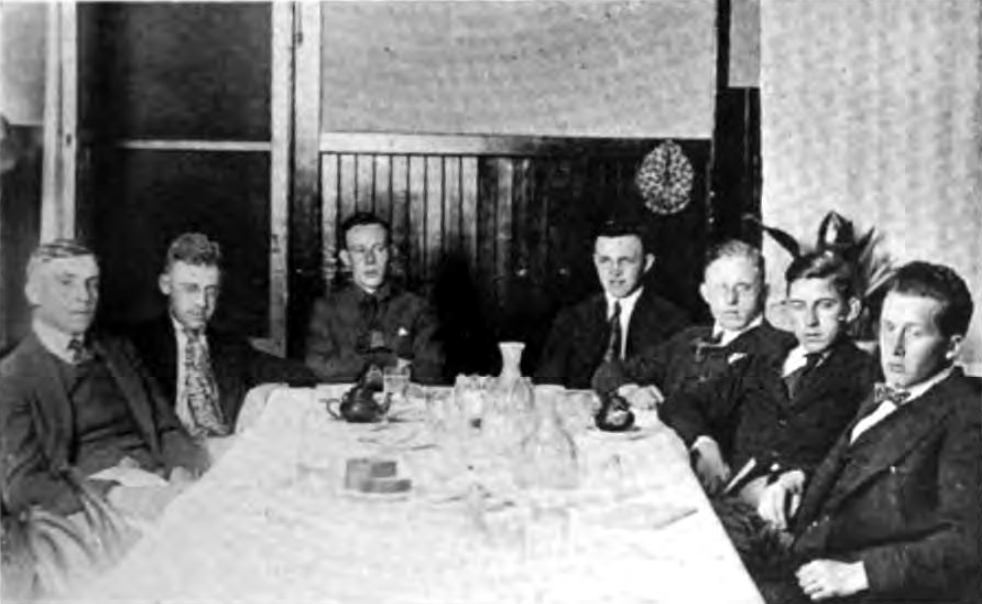
A weekly meeting of the Stanford Illustrated Review. Griffin is seated at the head of the table, on the left.

In his junior year, Griffin also created and served as the founding president of the Stanford Illustrated Review, the first-ever student sports magazine published at Stanford University. He served again in that position in his senior year. The Stanford Quad wrote of Griffin's sports journalism contributions that:

"Griffin's editorials have been, for the most part, clear, thoughtful and well expressed, though at times he has been vague and hard to follow. He has ventured into questions of national importance as well as topics of campus life, and has shown in these treatises a mind well stocked with information and able to think clearly and arrive at sane conclusions."

Griffin graduated Stanford in 1917. He had been a member of Phi Delta Theta, Sigma Delta Chi, the Stanford Press Club, and the Hammer and Coffin. His name as a reporter for most of these student publications was written as "R. A. Griffin," but at The Chaparral, he was known as "Al Griffin."

In 1917, the Illustrated Review transformed from an independent publication, the Stanford Press Club took over management. The year after Griffin's graduation, as more and more students from campus were being called to fight in World War I, the Stanford Press Club was temporarily dissolved, and the Illustrated Review was taken-over by the Stanford Alumni, awaiting the return of all the student journalists who interrupted their studies to fight.

The Stanford Press Club permanently dissolved in 1923, when it merged into Sigma Delta Chi.

== World War I ==
=== Creator of military training and ROTC at Stanford ===
While he was still at Stanford, as World War I kept raging in Europe, Griffin was one of only two Stanford men, alongside Frank C. McCulloch, who were directly responsible for the creation of Stanford's first military training programs to prepare soldiers to fight in an eventual war in Europe. On March 28, 1916, with Griffin taking some sort of organizational role, Brigadier General Franklin Bell and retired captain Samuel A. Purviance spoke at the men's assembly of the Stanford Union. They were there to discuss whether Stanford would or should establish a military training program, simply called the "Drill." The president of Stanford, Ray Lyman Wilbur, heard from the men on whether they would be for or against the program.

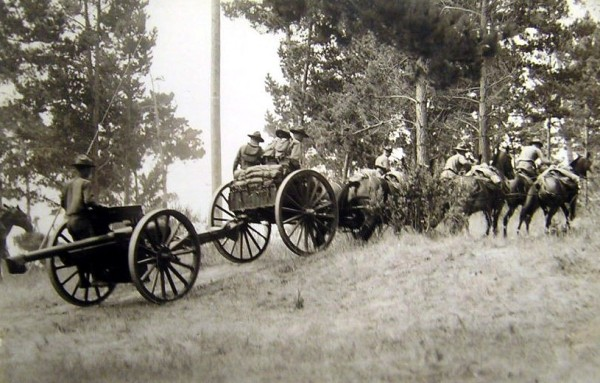
Griffin was responsible for Stanford's participation in the Citizens' Military Training Camp, which occurred in the woods somewhere in the Monterey Peninsula.

In July 1916, thanks largely to Griffin's efforts, Stanford joined its first Citizens' Military Training Camp in either Pacific Grove or Monterey, on an extension of land belonging to the Presidio of Monterey. George C. Marshall was on the cadre of one of these camps in Monterey, at the Hotel Del Monte.

On July 14, 1917, Griffin married Phyllis Hayes, the daughter of Congressman Everis Hayes.

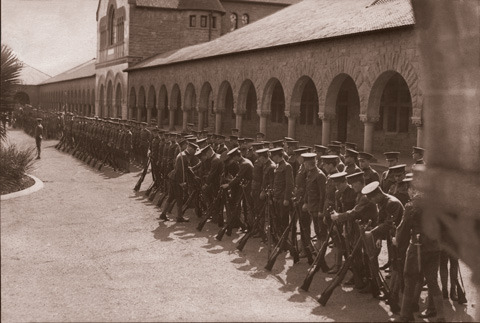
Griffin served as the first Battalion Cadet Major in the history of the Stanford University Reserve Officers' Training Corps. Stanford ROTC existed from 1916, well into the 1970's.

In the fall of 1916, Griffin's campaign to establish a military training program at Stanford proved successful. Jens Bugge was sent to Stanford to organize the Stanford University Reserve Officers' Training Corps (Stanford ROTC). Bugge took up the Stanford title of "Professor of Military Science and Tactics." Bugge's initial cadre were all non-commissioned officers, until Bugge selected a core group of qualified student leaders.

On October 9, 1916, Bugge appointed Griffin to serve as a Cadet Captain of Stanford ROTC, and the companies were organized the following day. As Cadet Captain, Griffin commanded Company B, which on October 31, 1916, won the Competitive Drill and Ceremonies competition. Due to the fact that Stanford ROTC had not yet received any permanent uniforms or rifles to issue new cadets, the "dress and equipment" category was not graded heavily.

On November 3, 1916, at the Sigma Chi house, Griffin and J. H. Eastman recruited for the French section of the American ambulance service. They were seeking men between the ages of 21 and 35, and in sympathy with the Allied cause.

On December 8, 1916, Major Bugge promoted Griffin to cadet major of the battalion. As Cadet Major, he was in command of the entire Stanford ROTC, meaning that all student cadets at the school were under his supervision. At the 25th Founders' Day anniversary celebrations, celebrating 25 years since the university's founding, Cadet Major Griffin led his battalion to escort the colors onto the field at 9:30 am.

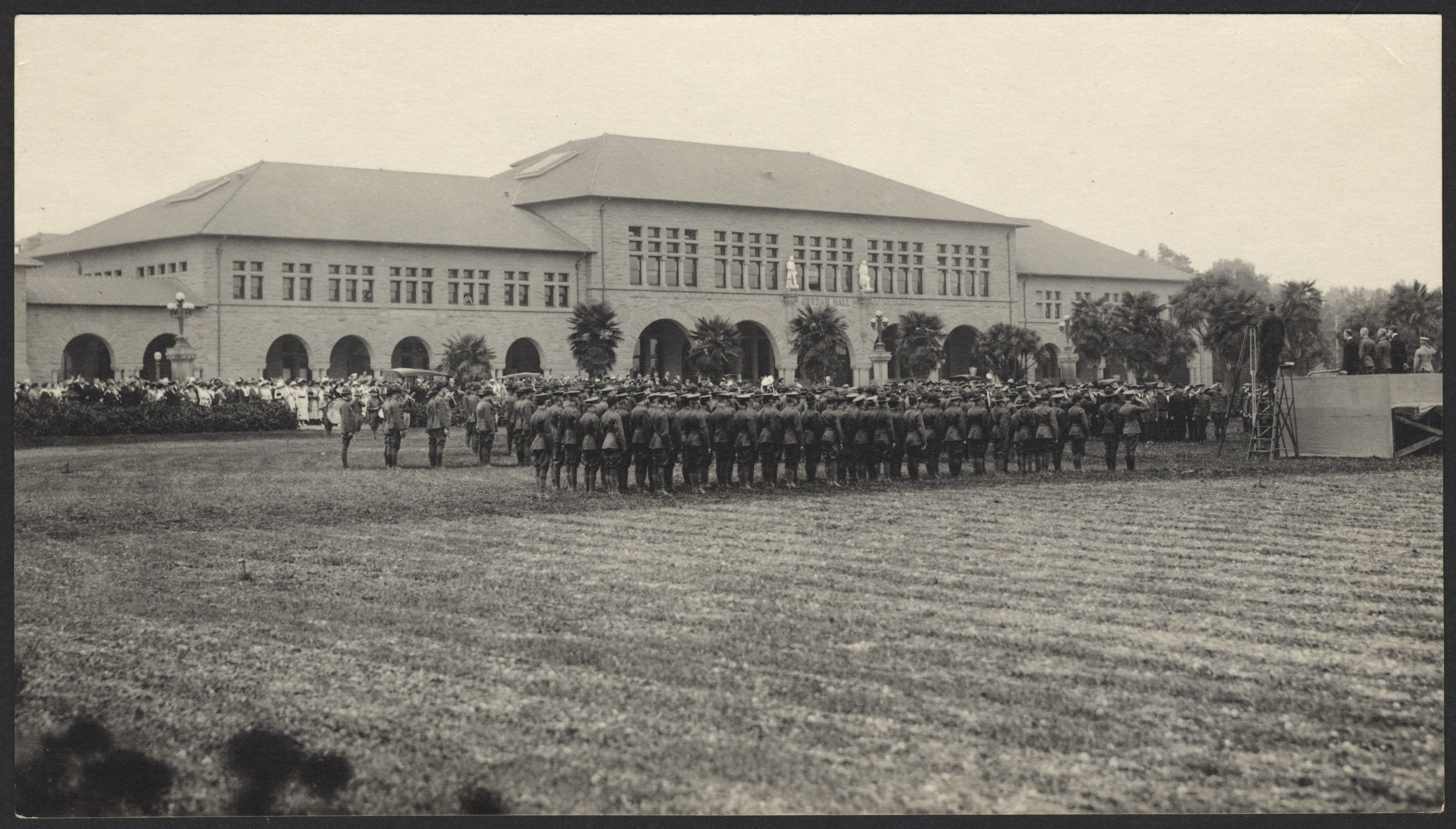
Stanford ROTC, seen here in 1917 or 1918.

On the night of March 14, 1917, Major Bugge, Cadet Major Griffin, and his company commanders, performed an inspection of the troops for the first time, and they did not perform well. Bugge and Griffin issued criticisms and marks of demerit for over half the men. When Major William David Davis and Major Bugge expected the battalion on April 24, 1917, Davis said that the battalion had made a "remarkable showing," and was pleased with Griffin's command.

In the spring of 1917, Stanford ROTC was reorganized, and "Griffin's Battalion," now called the Second Battalion, was placed under the roster of a regiment. The First Battalion was commanded by a member of the NCO cadre, Sergeant Bates. They experienced their first field training exercise on a hike into the hills around Stanford in April, 1917, where "moving pictures" were captured of Griffin's battalion.

Prior to Griffin's graduation, he was expected to join the rest of his fellow Stanford men in the service of the Stanford Unit of the American Ambulance Service, which had been organized by J. H. Eastman and a group of San Francisco businessmen.

Major Bugge later went on to become the Superintendent of West Point.

=== Military commission and deployment ===
When Griffin graduated in 1917, he was commissioned as an officer into the Infantry Branch of the United States Army. He was given a direct commission as captain, and sent to the European theatre of World War I. He commanded Company F of the 364th Infantry Regiment, 91st Infantry Division.

On September 26 or 27, 1918, during the Meuse–Argonne offensive, F Company was trapped in a cloud of smoke and fog. Under heavy artillery fire, Griffin led the company to take cover in a trench. As he was getting into the trench himself, he was knocked to the ground by a shell burst. When the enemy artillery barrage stopped, Griffin and his men went back toward the enemy.

The next day, Griffin led eleven soldiers to charge an enemy machine-gun nest. Later, during the continued attack on Épinonville, Griffin carried wounded soldiers off of the battlefield while under continued and heavy enemy machine-gun fire.

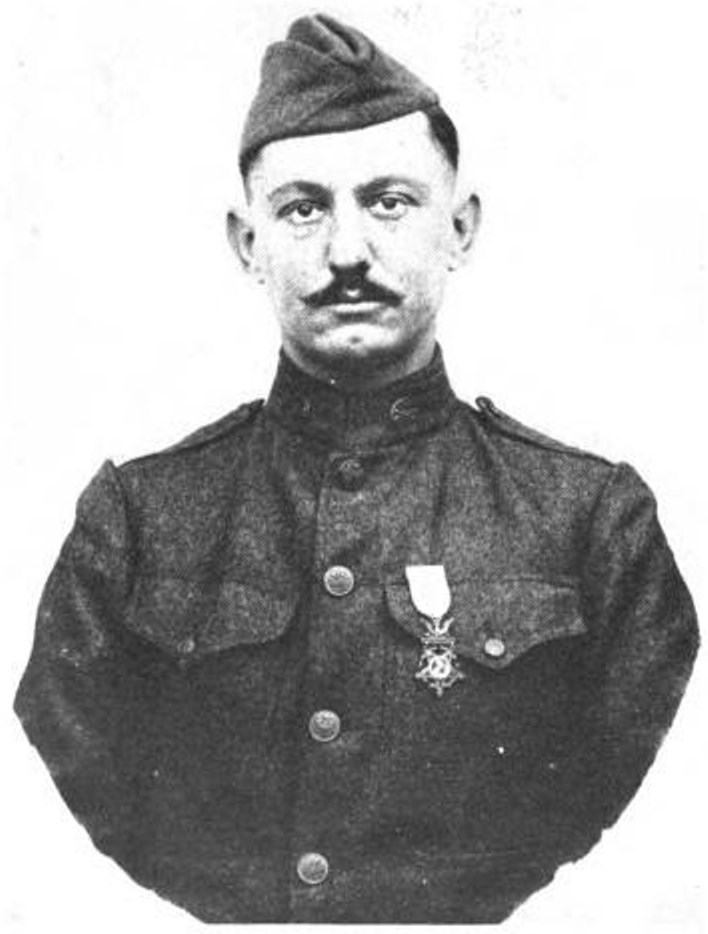
Lloyd Seibert earned the Medal of Honor while serving under Griffin's command.

On September 29, Griffin was severely wounded while on a patrol. He continued working, wounded, and under heavy machine-gun and artillery fire, and accomplished his assigned mission.

On July 9, 1918, President Woodrow Wilson awarded Griffin the Distinguished Service Cross "for extraordinary heroism in action."

In 1918, the CMTC camp where Griffin originally trained was named Camp John P. Pryor, in honor of John P. Pryor, the son of the mayor of Pacific Grove, who had just died in battle.

On January 1919, one of Griffin's Sergeants, Lloyd Seibert, was awarded the Medal of Honor.

== Involvement in Polish-American relations ==
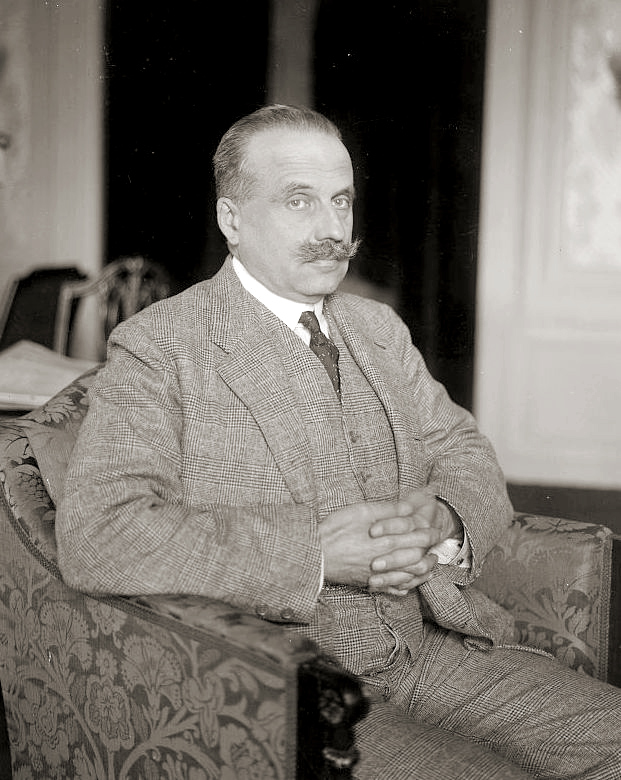
Griffin worked for Prince Kazimierz Lubomirski, the first Polish Minister to the United States.

In 1919, Griffin left the Army. He decommissioned while he was in Upton, New York, hoping to get a job in journalism somewhere in New York. He applied for more journalism jobs in Philadelphia, Chicago, Denver, and San Francisco. For a brief time, he served as a newspaper reporter in Portland, Oregon. While in Portland, he worked for two competing newspapers, the Portland Oregonian and the Portland Journal.

Later in 1919, as the Second Polish Republic had recently been established as a world state, Griffin was ordered to appear in Washington, D. C., where he was made Secretary to the first-serving Polish Minister to the United States, Kazimierz Lubomirski.

From 1920 to 1921, Griffin served as the director of the Polish Information Bureau.

=== Creation of the American-Polish Chamber of Commerce and Industry in the United States ===
While Griffin was working for Lubomirski, a group of members of the recently-established Polish-American Society wrote a letter to Lubomirski advocating the establishment of the American-Polish Chamber of Commerce and Industry (APCCI) in the United States. One of the primary objectives of this would be to encourage the United States to fund Poland's reconstruction effort after the war. Lubomirski replied to the group that they would get "...far-reaching help and assistance."

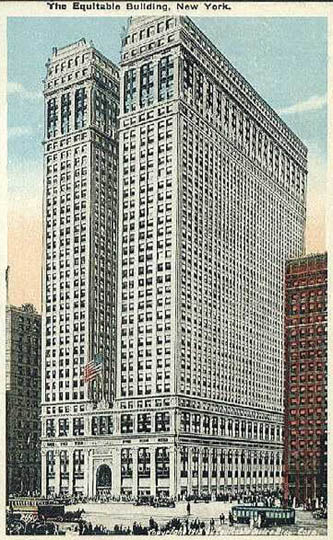
The APCCI was inaugurated at the Bankers' Club on Broadway, in the Equitable Building.

Lubomirski nominated Griffin to the position of Secretary of APPCI. A meeting of APCCI's organizers was held on February 25, 1920, but it wasn't formally registered until April 6, 1920, after paperwork was filed. The APCCI's inauguration ceremony was on May 27, 1920, with 129 people in attendance at the Bankers' Club on Broadway. Five days later, the first official meeting of the APCCI took place. The first president of APCCI was François de St. Phalle. Philip Bird was treasurer. At the end of may, APCCI published the first issue of their journal, the Journal of the American-Polish Chamber of Commerce and Industry.

Toward the end of 1920, St. Phalle and Griffin got into a series of disagreements. Griffin was concerned that St. Phalle, as Vice President of Baldwin Locomotive Works, was using his position to "monopolize the Chamber." Griffin suggested that John Smulski be brought into the board of directors to "balance this tendency."

In October 1920, APCCI distributed the first issue of the Information Service Weekly News Letter.

In the middle of 1921, the Polish government withdrew its funding of APCCI, and Griffin predicted that the Chamber would rapidly collapse without the funding. He sent letters to Hopolit Gliwic to that effect, urging the Polish government to reconsider. On August 16, 1921, Gliwic and St. Phalle reached an agreement to create a category of "sustaining members" who would each pay a $1,000 membership fee.

In mid-September, 1921, Griffin was replaced as Secretary of APCCI by Conrad C. Lesley.

== Founding the Monterey Herald ==
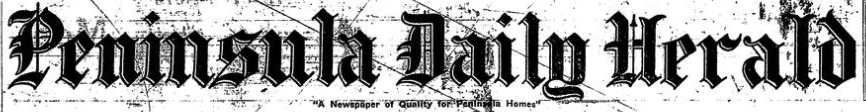
Logo of the Peninsula Daily Herald from 1922 to 1929.

In late 1921, Griffin returned to the Monterey Peninsula on vacation. While he was here, the local business community convinced him to start his own newspaper in the area, known in the industry at the time as the "graveyard of newspapers." He did not return to New York. Griffin moved into the Old Whaling Station, formerly owned by Lincoln Ellsworth.

On June 15, 1922, the first issue of Griffin's paper, the Peninsula Daily Herald, was printed in Monterey. He wrote a column in the paper every edition called News Comments. Griffin, for Monterey, desired that the city have a city manager. He also pushed reform at the Monterey Chamber of Commerce.

At the top of the front page on the issue of June 21 were the words "Greetings Monterey Peninsula." In the upper right corner, an arrow pointed at the newspaper's logo, next to the words "To a Greater Monterey Peninsula, straight ahead."

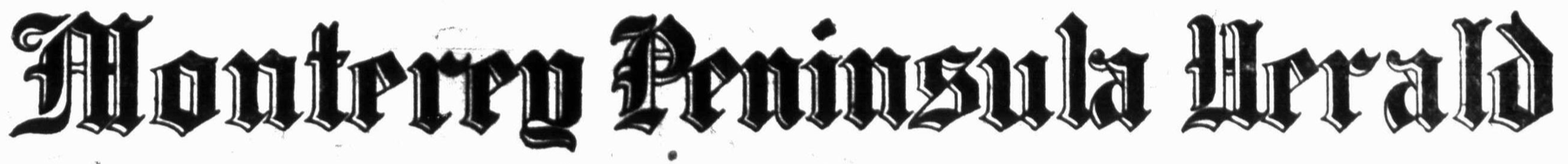
Logo of the Monterey Peninsula Herald from 1929 to 1986.

In 1922, Griffin partnered with David Alberto to create the Monterey Philharmonic Society. Their first concert was held on October 24, 1922. In February 1923, Griffin purchased the Monterey Cypress-American and consolidated it with the Herald. From 1929, the paper became known as the Monterey Peninsula Herald.

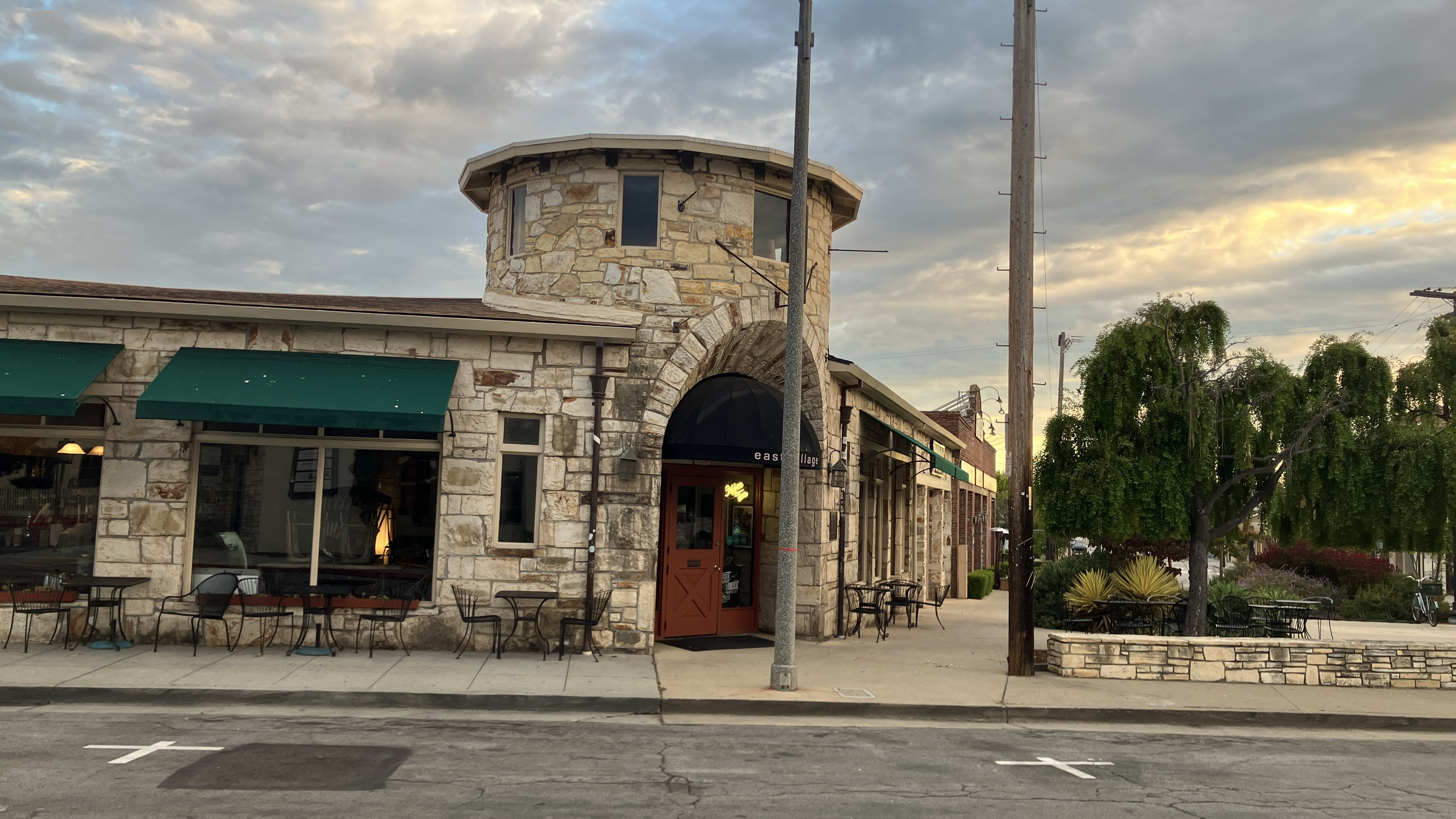
Building where the Herald was printed from 1927 to 1953, next to Griffin Plaza, in Monterey.

In 1927, the Herald moved into the newly built Carmel stone chalk rock building at the corner of Washington Street and Pearl Street. The building had been designed by A. Nostovich and built by A. C. Anthony. Originally, the building had a mission tile roof. Today, the building is known as the J. C. Anthony Building. In 2023, the words The Herald were still carved into the arched panel above the main door.

== Carmel Pine Cone and KDON ==
In July 1926, Griffin purchased one half of the Carmel Pine Cone from J. A. Easton, becoming a co-owner of the paper with Easton. Easton, meanwhile, earned a half-share of interest in the Herald. Griffin became dissatisfied with the relationship, and in November, purchased Easton's shares. He approached Perry Newberry to take over the second half of the Pine Cone. Newberry was initially hesitant, but Griffin convinced him. Newberry wrote his first issue on December 3, 1926.

Griffin was co-publisher of the Pine Cone until 1930. He sold his share of the Pine Cone to Hal Garrott, a playwright from New York who had moved to Carmel from Minneapolis.

In 1935, Griffin created KDON, 1210, and entered into radio journalism, as part of Don Lee Mutual. Griffin's executive station manager, commercial manager, and program director was listed as Howard V. Walters. R. F. Lewis, Jr. was the chief engineer. KDON was headquartered at 498 Washington Street, Monterey, and Griffin's business was registered as the Monterey Peninsula Broadcasting Company. In 1938, Cecil Lynch was listed as program manager. By 1940, KDON was listed as "Mutual's voice in the Monterey Bay Area." Meanwhile, KHUB from Watsonville, also claimed to be "The voice of the Monterey Bay Area." In 1940, it had moved its headquarters to 275 Pearl Street, with a transmitter on the Municipal Wharf. Their second studio in Santa Cruz was at the Casa del Rey Hotel.

In World War II, Griffen recommissioned in the Army – at 47 years old, where he again won more medals in combat. By 1948, he was still listed as a 50% owner of KDON, sharing co-ownership with Salinas Newspapers, Inc. On April 9, 1948, Griffin sold Monterey Peninsula Broadcasting to Salinas Newspapers, Inc.

== Founding the Monterey History & Art Association ==
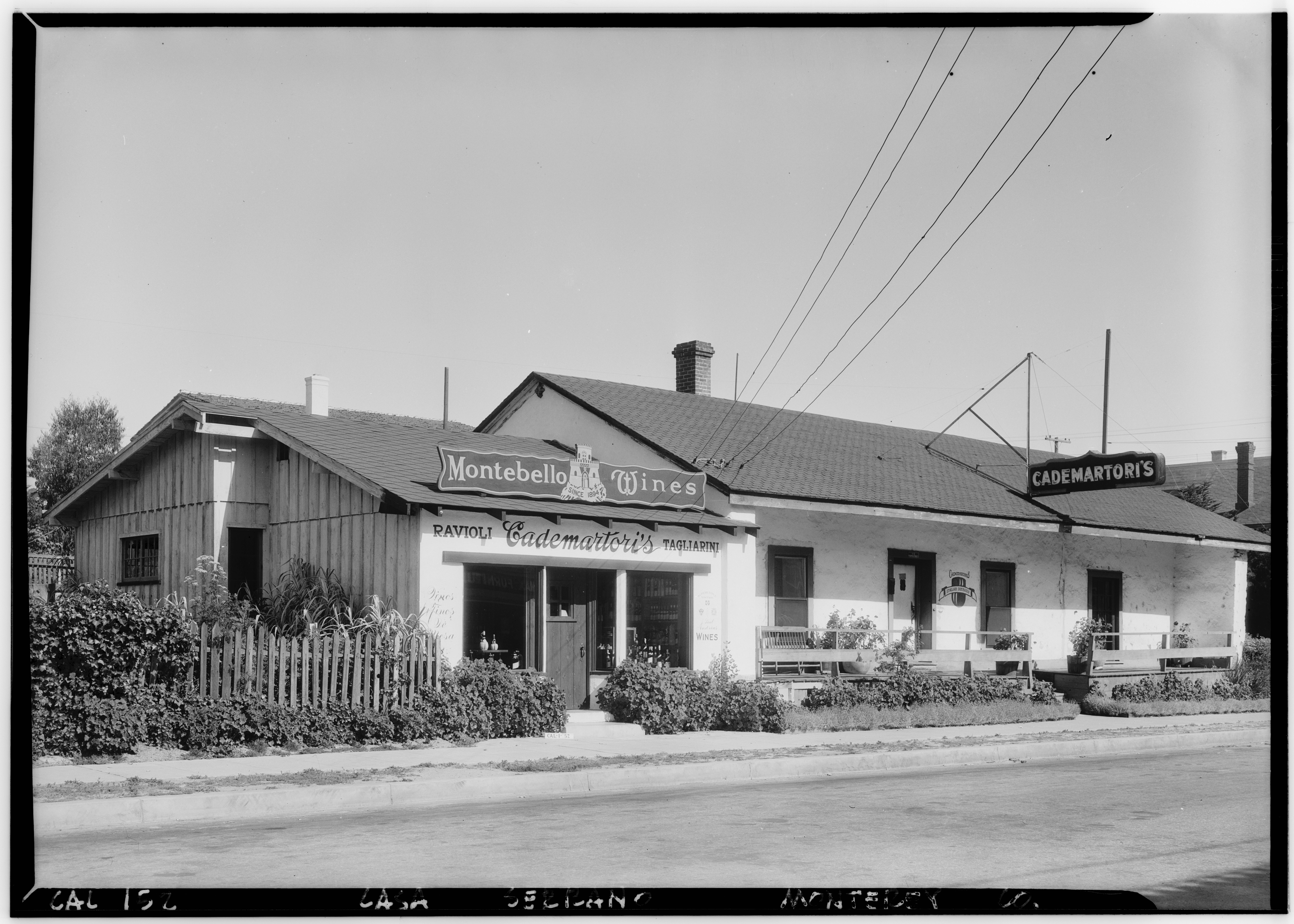
Cademartori's Restaurant (Casa Serrano) as seen in 1936.

In 1930, Griffin joined a meeting of a small group of Monterey Peninsulans at Cademartori's Restaurant (Casa Serrano). Here, this group planned the foundations of the organization that became the Monterey History and Art Association (MHAA). Griffin used his position and his column at the Herald to advance MHAA's goals, advocating for historical preservation in the area and its natural aesthetic. He fought against billboards and overhanging signs in the county.

== World War II ==
=== Pre-mobilization ===
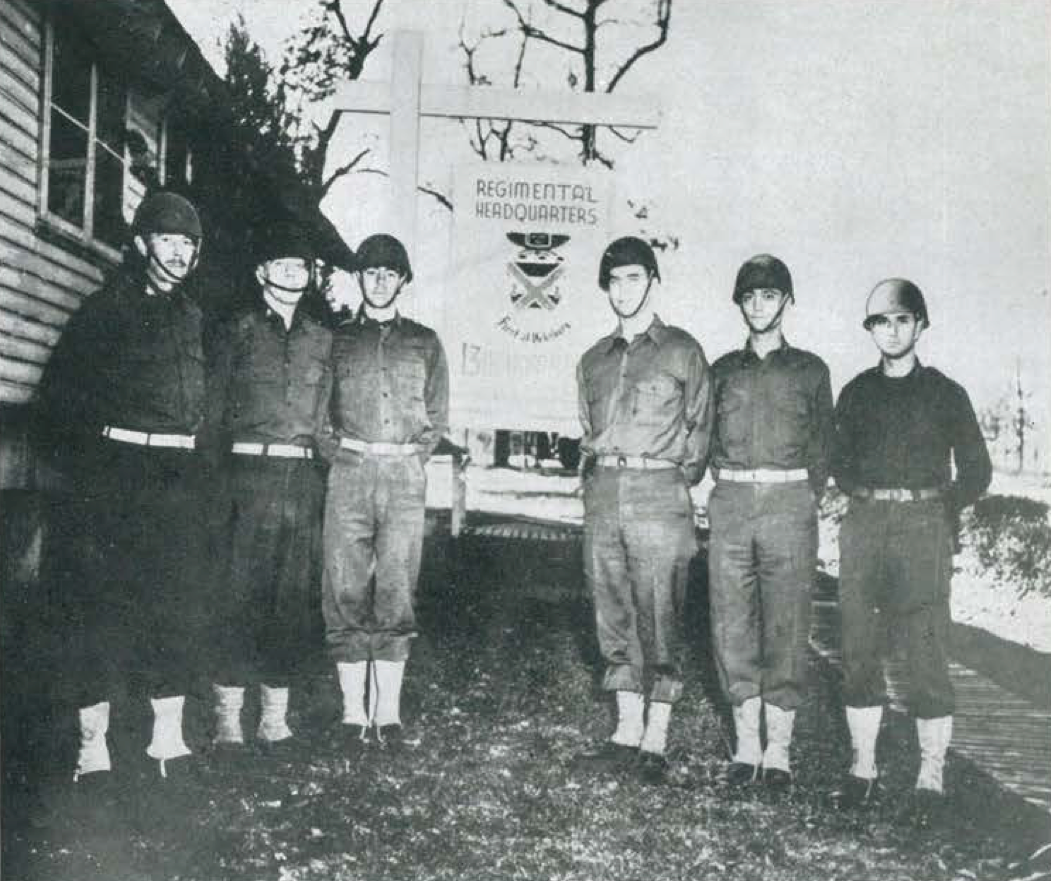
Griffin (left) with the leadership of the 13th Infantry Regiment in 1943 at Camp Forrest.

In 1941, at age of 47, Griffin – now independently wealthy and beyond standard service age – applied for service in the Army. He passed the United States Army Physical Fitness Test, but was denied service in the Army because he was too old. In Spring 1941, he eventually was able to recommission. He was appointed as the Public Relations Officer to General Ben Lear. Griffin said of Lear that: "He was the only General I ever knew that didn't give a damn what the public thought of him." He appointed William M. O'Donnell as managing publisher and editor of the Herald while he was away.

Because of his age, General Lear had difficulties placing him into a legitimate command. In 1941, General Lear petitioned the Army, several times, to promote Griffin to Colonel. On December 24, General Marshall replied that he was approving a promotion study for Griffin and similar cases.

In 1942, still as Lieutenant Colonel, Griffin edited an official adaptation of the Second Army's training guide entitled School of the Citizen Soldier. On the writing team were his assistant editor Ronald Shaw and General Lear. In its introduction, he wrote that: "We don't intend to give you any pep talks. The purpose of this program is to assist you to attain a better and clearer understanding of the world affairs at stake in this world war that traverses all the seas and has placed its heavy hand upon all the continents."

==== Commander of 13th Regiment ====
On March 15, 1943, as Colonel, Griffin assumed command of the 13th Infantry Regiment of the 8th Division, at Fort Leonard Wood, taking over from Lt. Colonel James C. Welch, who had been in temporary command for five days after the transfer of former commander Colonel Carter Collins. On March 18, while there was still snow on the ground in the Ozarks, the regiment moved to the Desert Training Center at Camp Laguna, Arizona. While the 13th was at Camp Laguna, the 8th Division was reorganized from a motorized division to an infantry division. On August 22, the regiment moved again to Camp Forrest, Tennessee. On November 22, the regiment moved to Camp Kilmer, New Jersey.

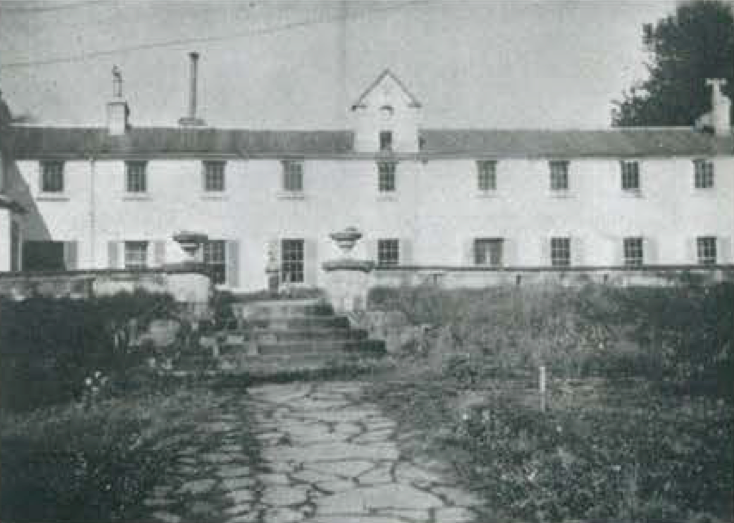
Griffin lived at Ely Lodge, Enniskillen, for six months in 1944.

On December 5, 1943, the regiment was loaded onto the troop transport ship SS Athos II at the New York Port of Embarkation, and at noon, set sail. The ship stalled, and they had to wait an extra day to fix the engine. The next day, they officially set sail, and arrived in Belfast Harbour on December 16. They trained in Northern Ireland for six months, six miles west of Enniskillen on Lough Erne. Griffin's Regimental Headquarters here were at Ely Lodge, on Ely Island. Training occurred at Drumcose Camp.

=== European Theatre of Operations (ETO) ===
On June 29, 1944, the regiment loaded onto the Liberty ship class SS Sea Porpoise and set sail. During the war, as a fan of Don Quixote, he named every jeep he drove Rocinante. Griffin, while technically the regiment's commander, found almost every opportunity to lead combat patrols.

On Independence Day, 1944, Griffin landed at Utah Beach eight days after the first landings. The regiment saw its first battle 5 days later. Until July 15, the regiment was engaged in battle near La Haye-du-Puits. From July 15 to July 30, the regiment was on the Ay River.

At 2am on July 30, the regiment moved to Mesnilaubert, and then advanced on Ducey-Les Chéris. They were attacked in an air-raid by 25 enemy Focke-Wulf Fw 190 and Messerschmitt Bf 109 on the night of August 1, with no casualties reported. On August 4, they moved into Rennes.

At Messac, Ille-et-Vilaine, near Rennes, Griffin was wounded in battle. He hid the wound from his soldiers, and led them into more combat operations, where he earned the Silver Star.

That month, Griffin was informed that his stepson Arthur Hately had been wounded serving in the United States Marine Corps in the Pacific War. He also learned that his father died. Another stepson, Jonathan Hately was killed in action.

On August 13, they were moved to an assembly area near Dinan. On August 17, they moved to Plouvien, where they cleared enemy defenses north of Brest, France. During the Battle of Brest, Griffin commanded Combat Team 13 and attacked Brest on the night of August 24 or early August 25, engaging in combat with the 2nd Parachute Division. During that portion of the Battle of Brest, 209 soldiers under Griffin's command were killed, and an additional 630 were wounded.

On September 9 and 10, the regiment was relieved by the 9th Infantry Regiment, and moved to the Crozon Peninsula, and its northern Quelern Peninsula. On September 19th, Griffin accompanied General Charles D. W. Canham and Lt. Colonel Earle L. Lerette to accept the surrender of General Herman Ramcke, ending the Battle of Brest.

In September 1944, Griffin, while still in Europe, wrote a column for News Comments, asking the community of Monterey to send his unit coffee, tabasco sauce, and tea. His editor noted in the same paper that shipments were already on the way.

After the Battle of Brest, Griffin's regiment and Combat Team 13 moved to the Siegfried Line. On November 14, they moved into the Hürtgen Forest and held an area of 2700 yards near Schmidt. The regiment had problems with a breakout of trench foot here.

On November 24 or 25, 1944, Griffin suffered a mysterious pain in his elbow that he could not identify, and had to be evacuated from the line, and temporary command was assumed by Lt. Colonel Earle L. Lerette. He was sent to Paris, and then to Walter Reed Army Medical Center. At Walter Reed, they found a 9mm bullet from a German MP 40 lodged in his elbow. He didn't know that he'd been shot.

General Lear asked him if he wanted to go home to Monterey, or to go back to the war. Griffin replied that he wanted to go back to the war "to finish the damn thing." When he left the Army, he was serving as a staff officer under General Lear.

== Return to Monterey ==
In August 1945, Griffin returned to the Herald. At his office, he hung a drawing of a knight tilting at windmills.

Around this time, Margaret Bates worked with Allen Griffin to convince Samuel Finley Brown Morse to sell his property near Fremont Street for the establishment of a permanent campus for Monterey Peninsula College.

In November 1947, Griffin and Carmel Martin were appointed to an advisory committee for Point Lobos State Park by Duncan McDuffie, president of the Save the Redwoods League.

== Missions to Asia ==
In 1948, he was sent to China for the Economic Cooperation Administration (ECA), where he served as the Deputy Chief for Roger Lapham, who was just ending his term as Mayor of San Francisco. Griffin and Lapham distributed aid to the government of Chiang Kai-shek.

Preston Goodfellow, the former owner of the Brooklyn Eagle, had already left Korea by that point. However, Griffin once admitted that when other officers of the CIA approached him for funding requests from the Marshall Plan fund for the Far East, he said: "We'd look the other way and give them a little help... Tell them to stick their hand in our pocket."

Around the time that Griffin was in Taiwan, Livingston T. Merchant also visited the island for the first time on his own mission. Griffin advocated that "drastic mean" should be taken to prevent the island from being controlled by either the Nationalists or the Communists. Griffin and Merchant discussed this at length.

When the United States Congress reduced that aid, Griffin returned to the United States.

On January 25, 1950, Griffin earned a Doctorate of Law from Occidental College. After this, he occasionally would be referred to as "The Honorable," or "Dr. Griffin."

=== Griffin Mission ===
In 1950, Griffin went on the Griffin Mission.

=== Far East Program Division ===
On October 16, the United States Information Agency announced that the United States had formed an agreement of economic cooperation with the newly established Republic of Indonesia, based on Griffin's earlier recommendations. The United States allocated $11.5 million in aid for public health, agriculture, fisheries, industry, and education.

On October 21, 1950, Griffin took over as the director of the ECA's Far East Program Division from the outgoing Harlan Cleveland. There, he became a member of the Southeast Asia Aid Policy Committee (SEAC).

In November, Griffin went on another tour of Southeast Asia with William Chapman Foster, stopping first in the Philippines.

By January 1951, Griffin was back in Washington, where he engaged in conferences with ECA and State Department officials about reorienting the program as a result of his experiences on the "front line."

== Later career at the Herald ==
On February 14, 1952, he returned to Monterey. He supported the presidential campaign of Dwight Eisenhower.

On October 24, 1952, Griffin was made a member of the Executive Committee of the National Committee for a Free Asia.

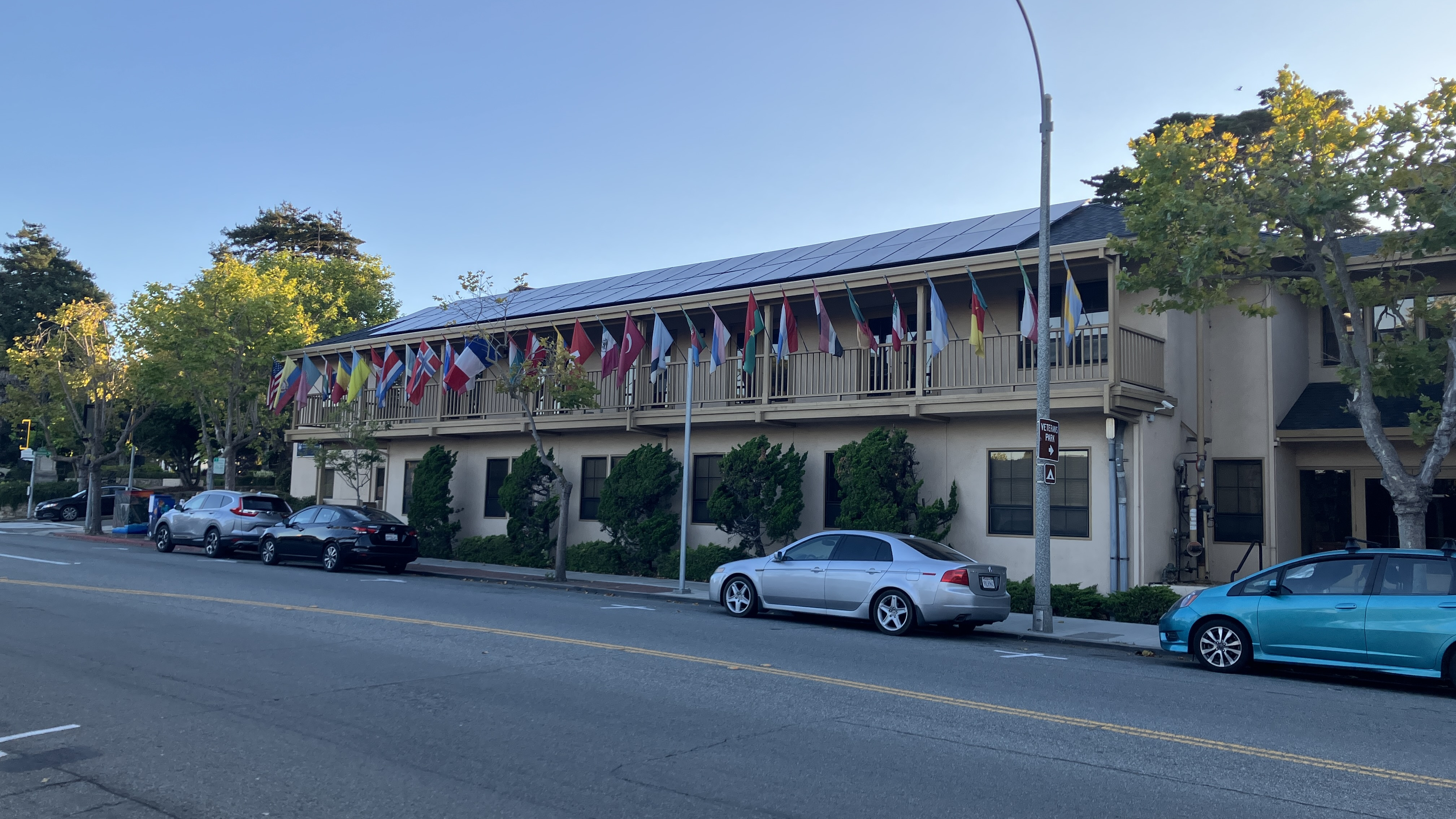
In 1953, the Herald moved to an office on Pacific Street. Today that location is part of the Middlebury Institute of International Studies at Monterey.

In 1953, The Herald moved into its new headquarters building at the corner Pacific Street and Jefferson Street, in the old Monterey neighborhood of Spaghetti Hill. That building is now on the campus of the Middlebury Institute of International Studies at Monterey. It was remodeled in the Bay Area Style, associated with William Wurster.

In 1963, Griffin started a successful class action lawsuit to redistrict Monterey County, gaining an additional County Supervisor, rebalancing Monterey Peninsula's balance of power against Salinas Valley in County affairs.

In December 1964, Fort Ord's basic training program was closed due to meningitis. In his newspaper, Griffin urged the Army to resume their activities. He bankrolled a delegation to travel to the Pentagon and argue the case there. Fort Ord resumed its program in Spring 1965.

When the Humble Oil Company considered the construction of an oil refinery in Moss Landing – to protect Monterey's "Clean Airshed," Griffen used the Herald to block it, forcing Humble to build the Benicia Refinery instead. In the 1970's, Griffin protested, marching on the street, against air pollution from the Moss Landing Power Plant and PG&E.

Griffin actively opposed the construction of a freeway through Monterey. When the California Division of Highways went ahead with the plan, he was successful in convincing them to modify their plans and create a freeway with a smaller impact on the region.

In 1963, he became President of the International Press Institute (IPI). Later, he became executive director. For IPI, he travelled to Nairobi, New Delhi, and Hong Kong.

== Continued activities at MHAA ==
Even while Griffin was abroad in Asia, he maintained an interest in Monterey, especially when Warren J. Clear discovered a potential copy of a land claim made by Francis Drake to California in 1579 as a message in a bottle. Myron Oliver, a local antiques dealer and member of MHAA, attempted to unfurl the document to verify its authenticity in 1949. He could not, and neither could the British Museum, stating that it would have been impossible to unroll it. Nevertheless, Griffin offered Clear a substantial amount of money for the scroll, but Clear refused to part with it.

From 1961 to 1963, Griffin served as President of the MHAA, taking over leadership from Allen Knight. His successor was Henry Jones.

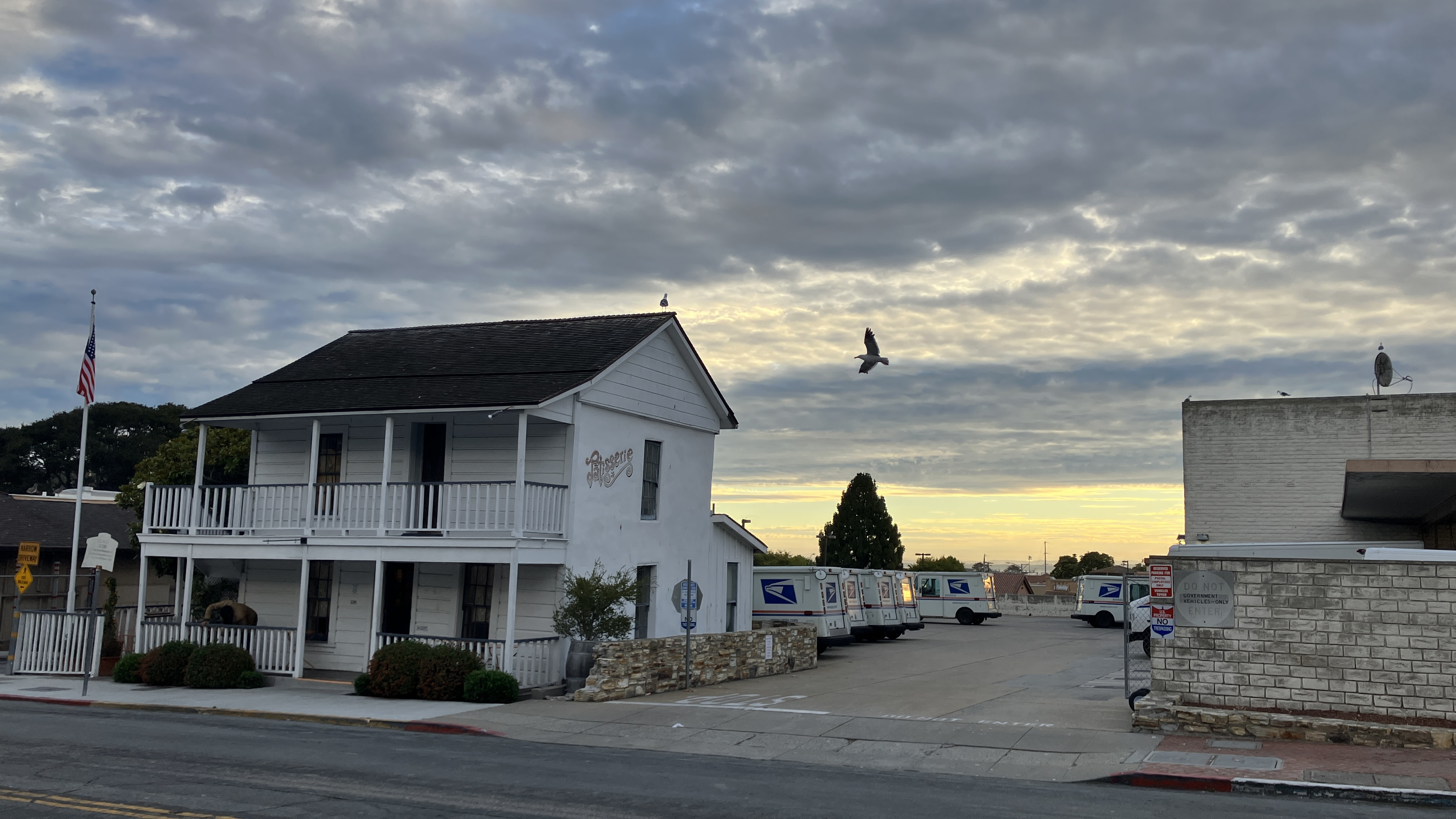
Freemont Headquarters is seen on the left, next to the Post Office parking lot. Today, it is occupied by a bakery.

In 1961, during his tenure as president, MHAA learned that Fremont Headquarters (today a bakery) was scheduled to be demolished in order to expand the Monterey Post Office. Griffin worked with the federal government, the City, and the Monterey Foundation to halt the development. In September 1961, Griffin announced that the $9,500 price was met, and the MHAA now owned their second-ever historic building, after Casa Serrano.

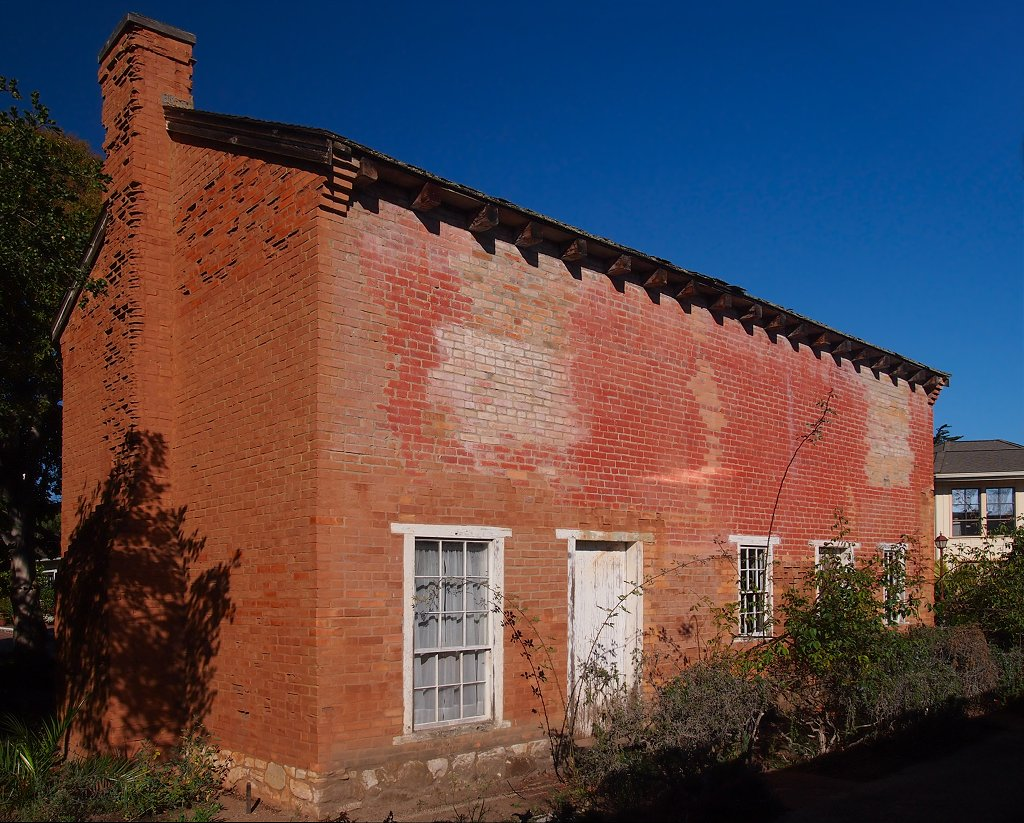
The First Brick House is the first brick house ever built in California.

Initially a supporter of the Urban Renewal Agency of Monterey, he became a sharp critic of the program. At a meeting of the MHAA board of directors in August 1963, Griffin suggested that if Urban Renewal purchased the Old Whaling Station or the First Brick House, it could be catastrophic for the environment. At the meeting, he said: "Those historical properties could become enclosed and used as an office or some such use if incorporated in the development of a motel." To stop that from happening, he proposed a resolution to support private ownership of the buildings in order to protect them, or for the MHAA to buy them if it needed to, which passed unanimously.

After many years as a director of the Monterey Peninsula Chamber of Commerce, in January 1964, they named him their first "Outstanding Citizen of the Year."

In 1965, Griffin shared the inaugural Laura Bride Powers Award with Myron Oliver and Mayo Hayes O'Donnell.

== Retirement and later life ==
In 1967, Griffin sold his share of The Herald to the Toledo Blade Co., but continued as the managing editor.

On April 7, 1967, Griffin was given an honor by Major General Robert G. Fergusson, the commander of Fort Ord. General Fergusson said that Griffin: “forcefully and accurately presented to the public a favorable Army image.”

In 1967, Robert Finch appointed him as a voting member of the California Bicentennial Commission.

On August 31, 1970, Griffin officially retired from The Herald.

On October 4, 1970, Griffin was awarded the Meritorious Civilian Service Award at a ceremony on Fort Ord, where 4,000 soldiers presented for his review. Major General Phillip B. Davidson also gave him a small statue of an infantryman. 500 people attended the afterparty at the Memory Garden, behind the Pacific House Museum.

On May 17, 1974, the General Joseph W. Stilwell Chapter of the Association of the United States Army honored Griffin with as Most Distinguished Citizen.

On July 19, 1891, he died in his home in Pebble Beach, California.

== Legacy ==
In 1986, Griffin was posthumously inducted into the California Newspaper Hall of Fame.

To this day, there are still no billboards in Monterey.

=== Colonel Allen Griffin Memorial Amphitheater ===
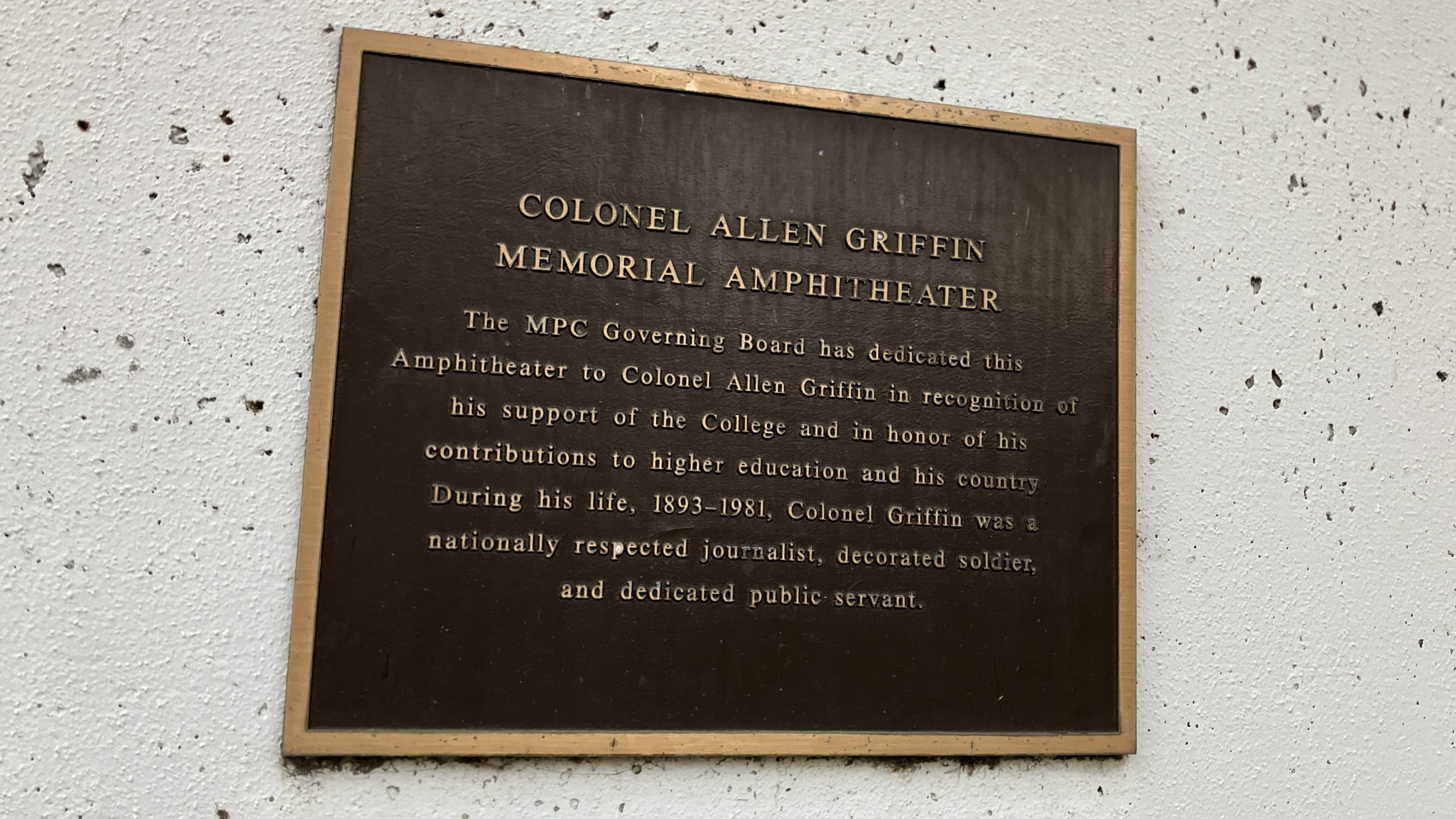
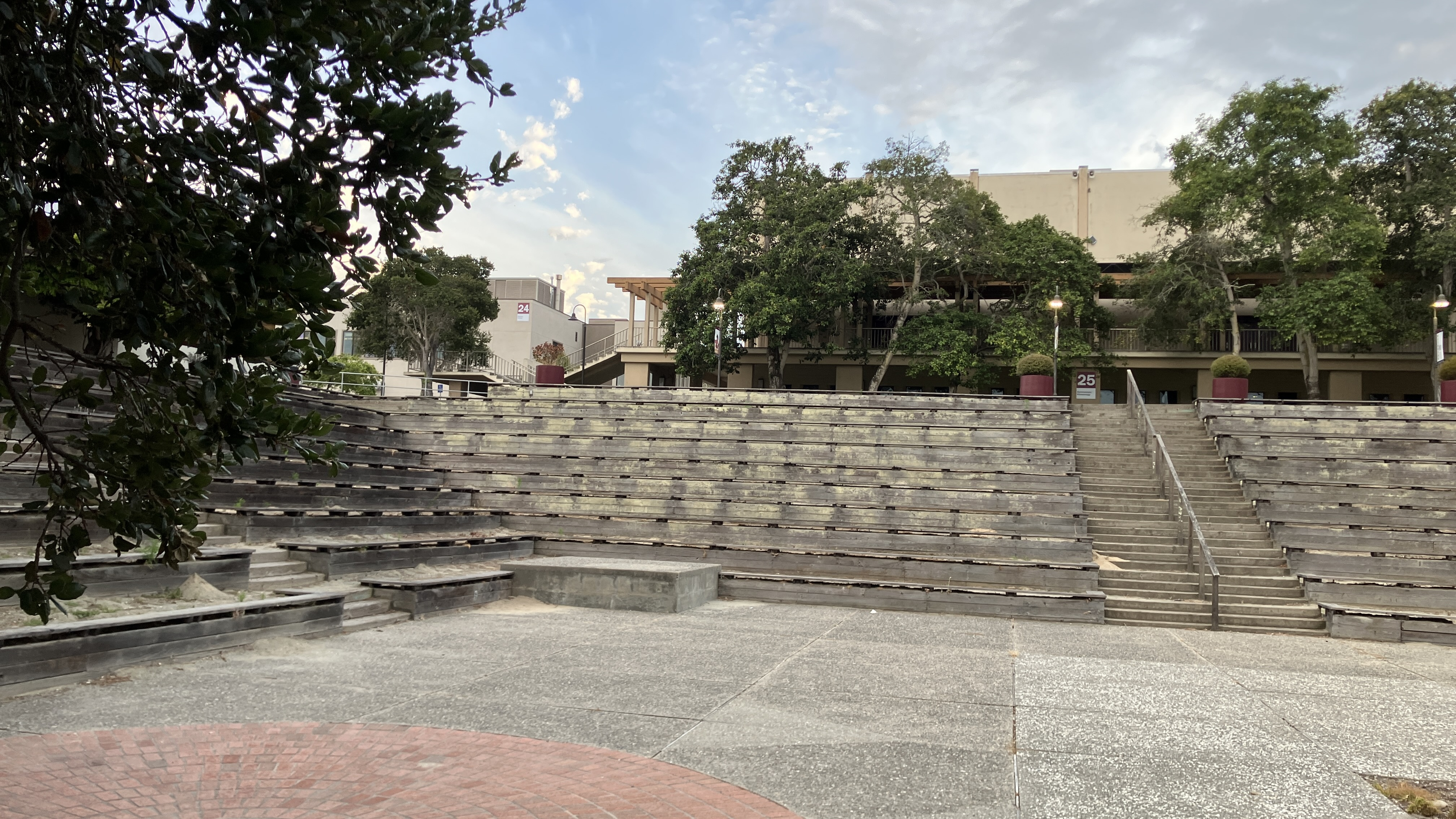
Colonel Allen Griffin Memorial Amphitheater, at Monterey Peninsula College

=== Griffin Plaza ===
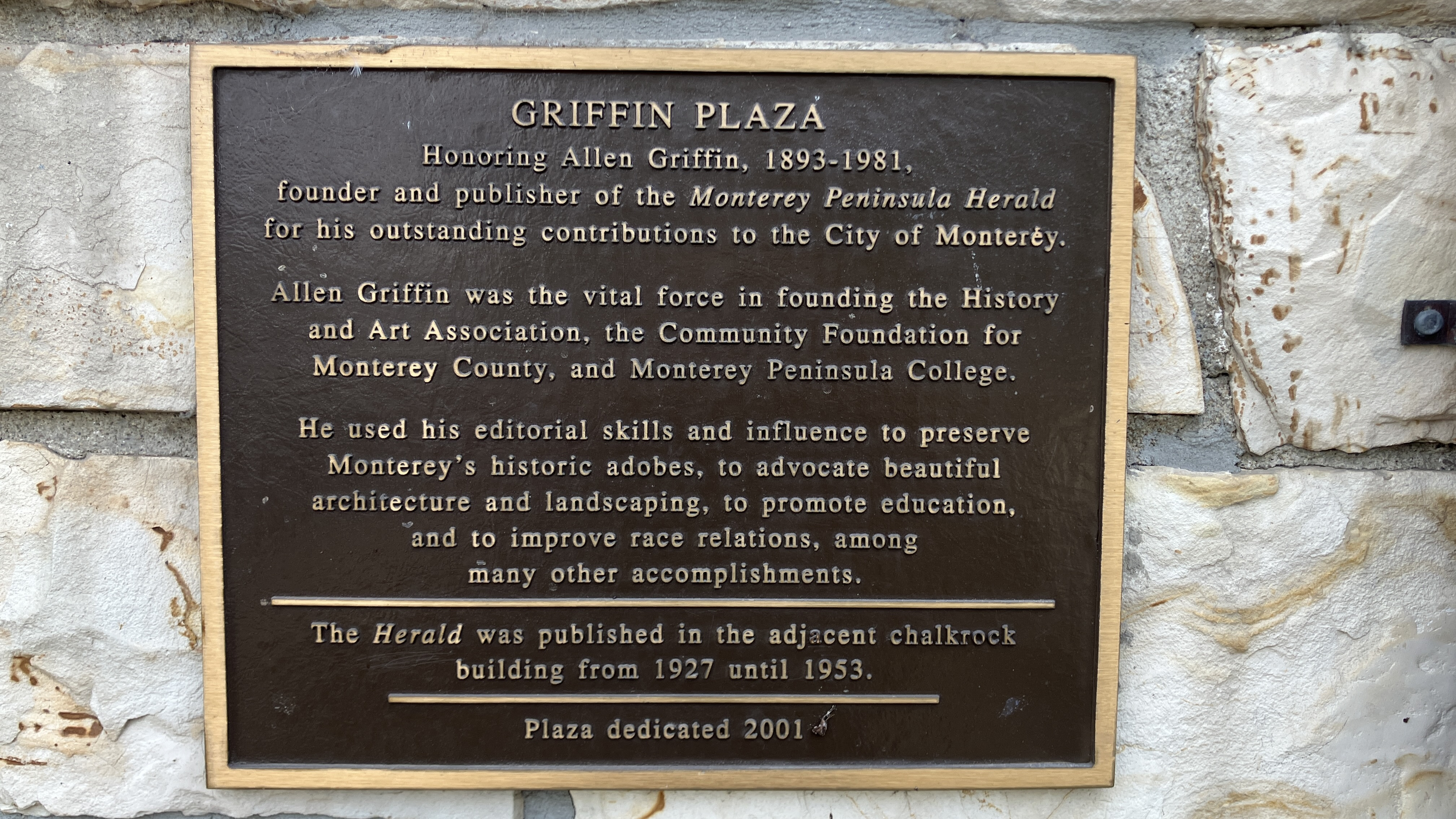
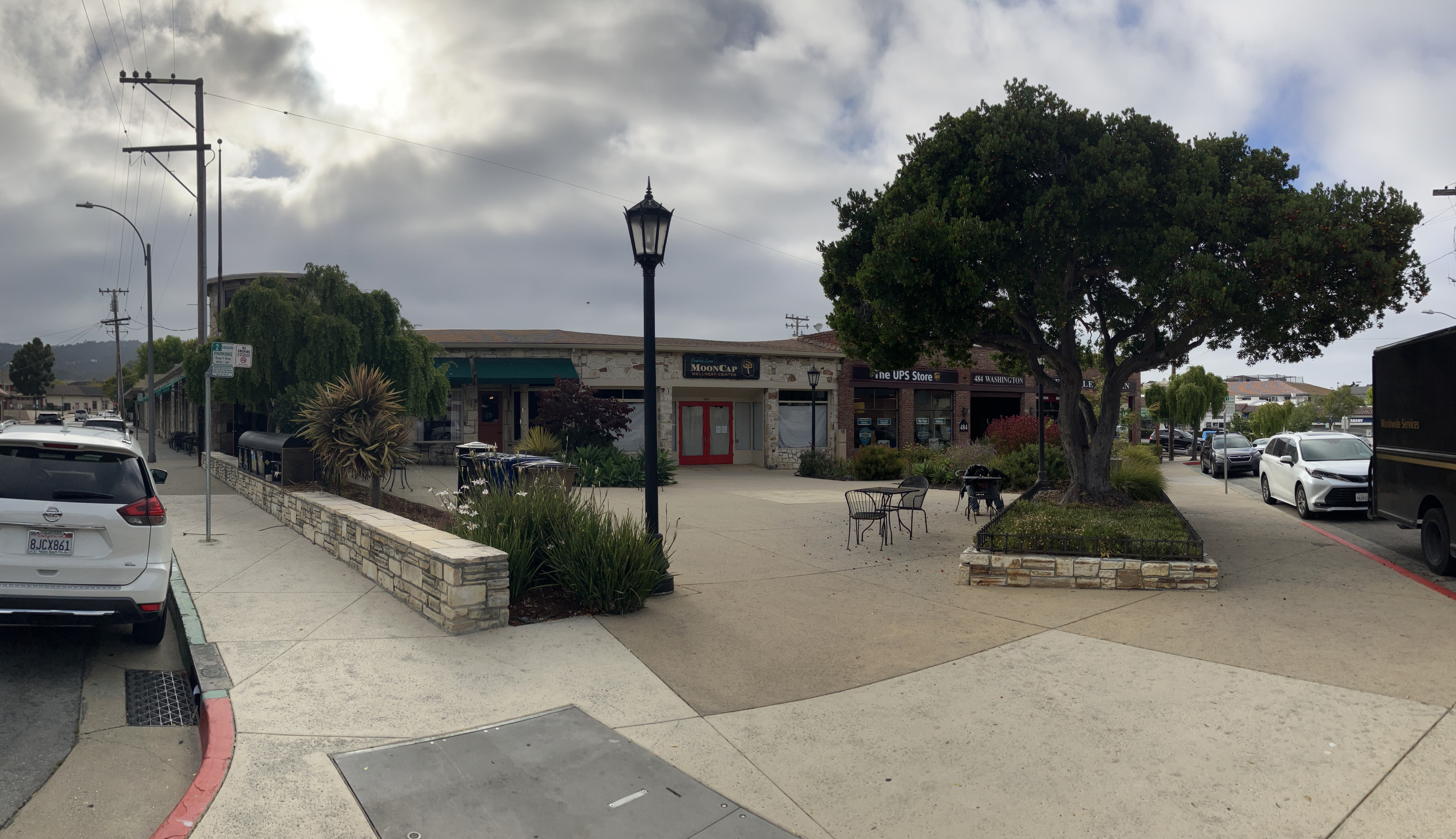
Griffin Plaza, in downtown Monterey, at the site where the Monterey Herald was printed from 1927–1953.

=== Allen Griffin Award for Excellence in Teaching ===
The Allen Griffin Award for Excellence in Teaching is awarded by the board of directors of Monterey Peninsula College (MPC) to teachers, often at institutions outside of MPC, for outstanding performance as educators in their community.
