= SS Athos II =

SS Athos II is the name of the following ships:

- SS Athos II (1925), scrapped in 1959
- SS Athos II (1939), ran agound off of Hairsis Island, Turkey, on 16 March 1962

== See also ==
- Athos (disambiguation)
- SS Athos
