= Griffin Mission =

The Griffin Mission was a mission of the Point Four Program to the Indochina peninsula led by Allen Griffin in 1950.

== History ==
Five months after the collapse of Nationalist China, in February, 1950, Allen Griffin was despatched to the Indochina peninsula on a "special mission," to study the implementation of the Point Four Program, called the Griffin Mission. The mission also went to Burma, Indonesia, Thailand, and British Malaya. The purpose of the Griffin Mission was to: "...ascertain most urgently if there are justifiable projects suitable possible Sec 303 financing which will have immed. polit. significance and demonstrate US interest in area such as projects for rice demonstration and extension work and anti-malaria campaign now prepared for submission Secy." Griffin was given Ministerial rank for the trip.

He was joined by his wife, and by Samuel Hayes, William McAfee, Henry Tarring, Jr., Elinor Koontz, and Mary Randolph.

Two military members of the Griffin Mission were US Army Colonel E. A. Duff and US Navy Captain W. Warder. These two men were responsible for handling the military aspects of the Griffin Mission, regarding official liaisons with French and other military officials in the area.

On March 10, 1950, a group of people that the local police department stated were "Communist terrorists" threw a grenade from a taxi at the front of the hotel where the ECA mission were staying in Saigon. None of the three men on Griffin's team were injured, but ten French soldiers were killed.

On March 17, the Griffin Mission arrived in Singapore, and Griffin went to Bukit Serene to meet with the Commissioner General, Malcolm MacDonald, and his staff. The final meeting between the Griffin Mission and MacDonald occurred on March 22.

From March 23 to April 4, the Griffin Mission toured Burma. Here, they recommended roughly $12 million in economic aid.

From April 4 to April 12, 1950, the Griffin Mission toured Thailand. At the end of this tour, they recommended $11,420,00 in economic and technical aid to the country. They expressed the primary concern that the Communist Chinese government would attempt to subvert Thailand using local ethnic Chinese citizens.

Later in April, 1950, the Griffin Mission toured Indonesia, where they also recommended economic aid.

=== Griffin Report and consequences for Vietnam ===
Map of controlled territories of Indochina in 1950.

Griffin is one of several men noted as being responsible, whether directly or indirectly, for the military buildup in Vietnam during the First Indochina War, which would eventually lead to the Vietnam War. Ultimately, because of his recommendations for the area, the military did increase its presence and financial power. Academic scholars, the US military, and the Chinese government have all stated that Griffin wanted to stop Communism from extending outward from China.

On March 15, the Griffin Mission submitted the Griffin Report to the government detailing their recommendations. They recommended a rural rehabilitation program, provision of commodities and industrial equipment, and a technical assistance program. Griffin also recommended a: "...psychological stock of ships with military aid material in the immediate future..." He intended this to be a statement of US commitment to the area.

Griffin recommended that overall, the United States should invest $60 million in aid to the region of Southeast Asia. Griffin also proposed that in the area of Vietnam, aid be given to the government of Bảo Đại, because he didn't consider the State of Vietnam to be secure enough to handle the aid properly. Griffin, in a letter to Secretary Dean Acheson, wrote: "Time is of the essence in the Vietnam situation. Bao Dai and his Government cannot maintain a status quo... If Bao Dai once starts slipping, it will be impossible to restore him."

The Griffin Mission wrote:

"The aims of economic assistance to Southeast Asia . . . are to reinforce the non-Communist national governments in that region by quickly strengthening and expanding the economic life of the area, improve the conditions under which its people live, and demonstrate concretely the genuine interest of the United States in the welfare of the people of Southeast Asia."

In March 1950, the aircraft carrier USS Boxer deployed 42 aircraft over Vietnam. The naval destroyers USS Stickelland USS Anderson moved into Saigon. As a show of force, Ho Chi Minh and his army launched a wave of attacks in the area. 700,000 Chinese soldiers were reported to be stationed in Kwangsi. Bảo Đại was reported to have 300,000 soldiers under his command.

Map of controlled areas in 1954, several years after Griffin left the region.

In May 1950, President Truman and Secretary Dean Acheson implemented Griffin's recommendations, and also established an economic aid mission to the Associated States in Vietnam.

On May 6, 1950, The Straits Times wrote that: "The Griffin Mission... was composed of capable men, but not one member had previous experience in Indo-China... The United States is grouping towards a policy in Indo-China with pitfalls on every side."

On June 3, 1950, Secretary Acheson wrote a letter to "The Honorable Robert Allen Griffin" at his home in Pebble Beach congratulating him "...upon the successful conclusion of the Special Economic Mission to Southeast Asia which you led and extend to you and those on your staff my warmest personal thanks..."

On June 27, 1950, with the commencement of the Korean War, President Truman announced that further aid would be provided to France and the Associated States. He also approved the creation of the Military Assistance Advisory Groupto be sent to the area. The Office of the Joint Chiefs of Staff (JCS) attributes Griffin's report, and that of Philip Jessupwho was also in the region on his own mission, as being a primary motivation for their major military buildup in the region.

The JCS writes that:

"[Griffin and Jessup] were convinced that only through Indochina could Southeast Asia be saved from communism, and they believed that small amounts of money properly spent would go far toward achieving this result.... the program, as originally conceived, was based upon the Bangkok conference conclusions and upon the Griffin and Jessup recommendations."

Griffin, himself, wrote:

"The people of Asia do not want to become the economic wards of the United States."
