= Lloyd Seibert =

United States Army Medal of Honor recipient (1889–1972)

Lloyd M. Seibert
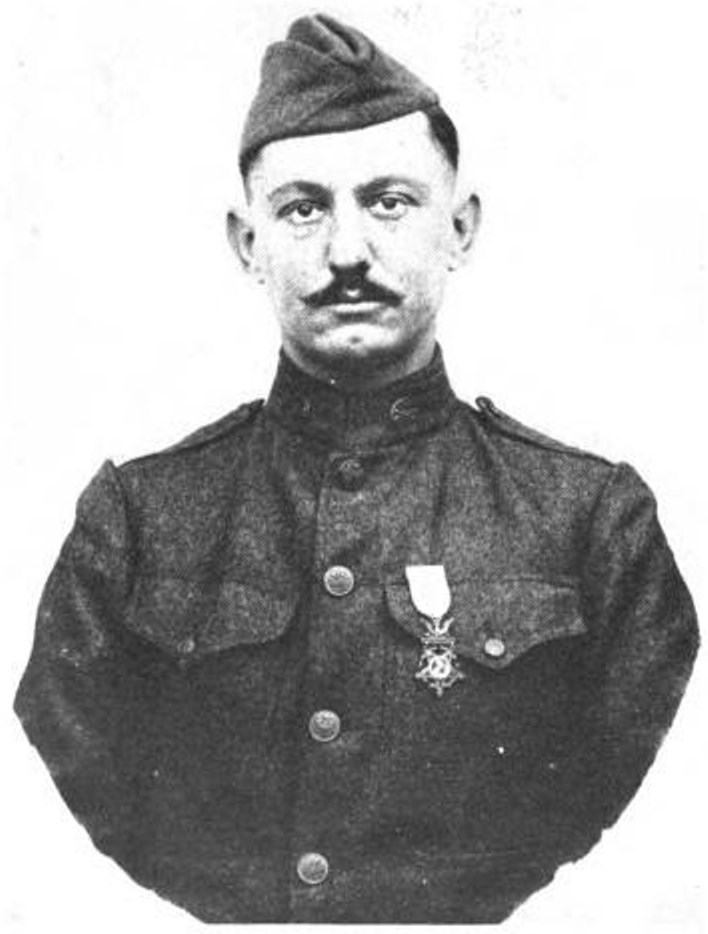
- Medal of Honor recipient
- Born: May 23, 1889; Caledonia, Michigan, US
- Died: October 15, 1972 (aged 83)
- Burial place: San Francisco National Cemetery
- Military career
- Allegiance: United States
- Branch: United States Army
- Rank: Sergeant and later Chief Warrant Officer
- Units: Company F, 364th Infantry, 91st Division
- Conflicts: World War I
- Awards: Medal of Honor; Silver Star; Purple Heart

Lloyd Martin Seibert (May 23, 1889–October 15, 1972) was a Medal of Honor recipient who was awarded the decoration for his valor in the United States Army during World War I.

== Biography ==
Seibert first enlisted in the California National Guard's 7th Infantry in January 1906. After World War I, he continued to serve on active duty in the U.S. Army. On 26 August 1937, Master Sergeant Seibert was appointed to the rank of Warrant Officer while assigned to the 1st Cavalry (Mechanized) at Fort Knox, Kentucky. He would later rise to the rank of Chief Warrant Officer - the rank he held upon retirement from the U.S. Army on 30 June 1944.

Seibert died in 1972 and is buried at San Francisco National Cemetery.

== Medal of Honor Citation ==
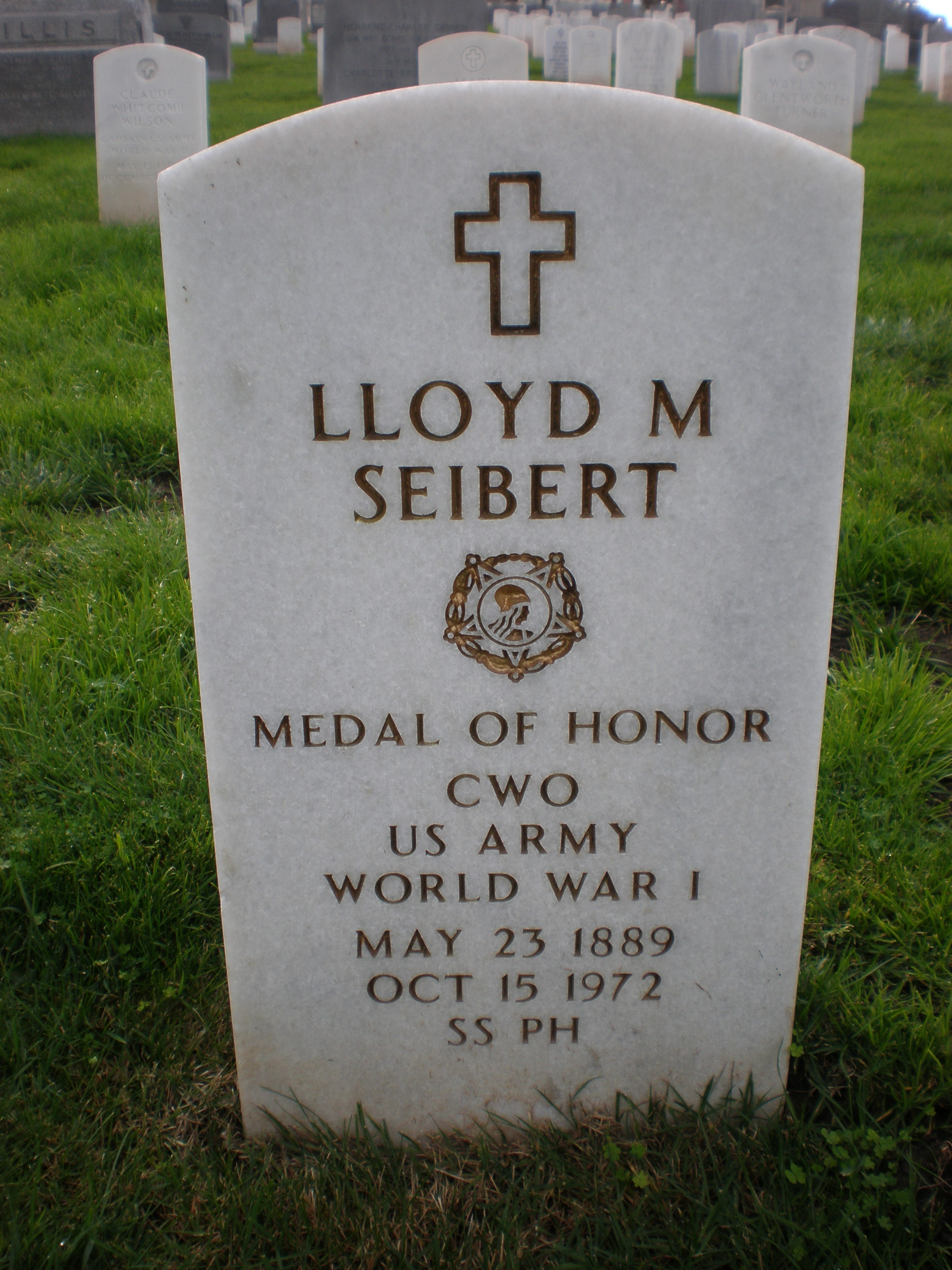
Seibert's headstone at San Francisco National Cemetery.

Rank and organization: Sergeant, U.S. Army, Company F, 364th Infantry, 91st Division. Place and date: At Epinonville, France; September 26, 1918. Entered service at: Salinas, California. Birth: May 23, 1889; Caledonia, Michigan. General Orders: War Department, General Orders No. 445 (1919).

Citation:

Suffering from illness, Sergeant Seibert remained with his platoon and led his men with the highest courage and leadership under heavy shell and machinegun fire. With two other soldiers he charged a machinegun emplacement in advance of their company, he himself killing one of the enemy with a shotgun and capturing two others. In this encounter he was wounded, but he nevertheless continued in action, and when a withdrawal was ordered he returned with the last unit, assisting a wounded comrade. Later in the evening he volunteered and carried in wounded until he fainted from exhaustion..

== Military Awards ==
Seibert's military decorations and awards include:

1st row	Medal of Honor		Silver Star
2nd row	Purple Heart	World War I Victory Medal w/three bronze service stars to denote credit for the Ypres-Lys, St. Mihiel and Meuse-Argonne battle clasps.	American Defense Service Medal
3rd row	American Campaign Medal	World War II Victory Medal	Médaille militaire (French Republic)
4th row	Croix de guerre 1914–1918 w/bronze palm (French Republic)	Croce al Merito di Guerra (Italy)	Medal for Military Bravery (Kingdom of Montenegro)

== See also ==
- List of Medal of Honor recipients for World War I
