= SS Athos II (1925) =

History

France
- Name: Athos II
- Owner: Compagnie des Messageries Maritimes
- Builder: Aktien-Gesellschaft „Weser", Bremen
- Launched: 12 November 1925
- Completed: January 1927
- Maiden voyage: 25 March 1927
- In service: 25 March 1927
- Out of service: July 1959
- Fate: Scrapped 3 August 1959

General characteristics
- Tonnage: 15,276 GRT 10,222 DWT
- Length: 543 ft 9 in (165.7 m); 566 ft (172.5 m) length between perpendiculars (as modified)
- Beam: 66 ft 2 in (20.2 m)
- Depth: 41 ft 4 in (12.6 m)
- Decks: 4
- Propulsion: 2 DR geared steam turbines4
- Speed: 17 knots (19.6 mph; 31.5 km/h); 19 knots (21.9 mph; 35.2 km/h) after 1937 boiler refit

Athos II was a passenger and cargo liner for Compagnie des Messageries Maritimes making her maiden voyage from Marseilles 25 March 1927 starting on the line's Far East service serving Marseilles, Malaya, Indo-China, Hong Kong, Shanghai, Kobe and Yokohama. The ship, laid down in 1923 and launched 12 November 1925, had been completed by Aktien-Gesellschaft „Weser", Bremen and delivered to the French as part of World War I reparations. After a 1937 refit, including boilers increasing speed to 19 knots (21.9 mph; 35.2 km/h), Athos II resumed Far East service.

The ship started World War II in French national service until captured by the Allies in North Africa and then being turned over to the United States War Shipping Administration by Free French authorities at Casablanca for operation as a troop transport allocated to the United States Army until returned to the French government in March 1946.

Athos II transported French troops to French Indochina, Korea, during the Suez intervention and lastly Algeria in the postwar years as well as a period carrying North African pilgrims to Jeddah.

== World War II ==
=== French national service ===
At the outbreak of World War II Athos II was still on the Far Eastern route but on 1 February 1940 at Colombo, Celyon joined the Australian/New Zealand convoy, designated US1 for secrecy and transporting about 13,500 troops to North Africa, under an escort then led by HMS Ramillies. After passage through the Suez Canal and return to France Athos II began Marseilles, Egypt and Syria service until the 22 June 1940 German-French armistice when the ship was laid up at Alexandria, Egypt along with other French ships seized in the Suez Canal and Egyptian waters. In addition to the merchant ships was a French naval force, Force X, under Admiral René-Émile Godfroy that had been operating with the British fleet out of Alexandria. After the fall of France with German controlled Vichy France controlling French ports the French were faced with the options of continuing with the Allies under General de Gaulle, demilitarizing or being sunk by the British. The British action against the French fleet at Oran stalled demilitarization but that resumed after further negotiations with the result reduction of French fleet's manpower, some 4,000 men, to one-third was required. Two thousand French sailors had already left Alexandria when Athos II was allowed to sail on 13 July 1940 with the 1,000 remaining personnel of Force X and some merchant crew members to France. In September 1940 repatriated French troops from Syria and then became the guard ship at Algiers until captured by the Allies in November 1942 during Operation Torch.

=== Allied service with United States War Shipping Administration ===
On 8 March 1943 Athos II was turned over to United States War Shipping Administration (WSA) control by French Authorities at Casablanca and on 1 April 1943 began operation as a WSA transport allocated to the United States Army and operated by French Lines, Inc. as agent. (Note: Though never bareboat chartered to or operated by the Army the association was such that the ship is sometimes seen as USAT Athos II.)

Athos II underwent conversion May—November 1943 for WSA troop service by Turbine Engineering Corporation of New York. In December the ship made a voyage to the United Kingdom, returning in January, 1944. On 21 January 1944 the ship left New York for the Southwest Pacific but engine trouble forced a return to Panama from the Galápagos Islands before again getting underway on 8 March. In continuing the round-the-world trip Athos II then called at Bora Bora, Fremantle, Bombay, Cape Town, departing 8 May but again having to undergo repairs until 9 June, crossing the Atlantic to Recife to arrive 1 July 1944 in New York. Subsequent operations were between New York and Naples, Le Havre, Southampton and Plymouth. After two round trips to Naples the ship underwent extensive repairs in New York before resuming operations in February 1945. On a return from a Le Havre and Southampton voyage the ship again suffered engine problems and had to put into Horta, Azores in December 1945 where troops were transferred to USS Enterprise. Athos II returned to New York after repairs and was released from troop transport service January 1946 to be returned to French authorities by WSA.

== Return to French service ==
On 23 March 1946 Athos II was turned over to the French Shipping Mission at New York.

== Bibliography ==
- Association French Lines. "Liner Athos II". Association French Lines.
- Charles, Roland W. (1947). Troopships of World War II (PDF). Washington: The Army Transportation Association. p. 284. LCCN 47004779. Archived from the original (PDF) on April 2, 2015.
- Gill, G. Hermon (1957). Royal Australian Navy 1939-1942. Australia in the War of 1939–1945. Series 2 – Navy. Vol. 1. Canberra: Australian War Memorial. LCCN 58037940.
- "Lloyd's Register 1945–46" (PDF). Lloyd's Register (through PlimsollShipData).
- Maritime Administration. "Athos II". Ship History Database Vessel Status Card. U.S. Department of Transportation, Maritime Administration. Archived from the original on April 2, 2015.
- "Reparations Ship Launched" (PDF). The New York Evening Post. November 17, 1925.
- Smith, Eugene W. (1947). Trans-Atlantic Passenger Ships Past and Present. Boston: George H. Dean Company. LCCN 89894866.
- Swiggum, S.; Kohli, M. (July 1, 2012). "SHIP DESCRIPTIONS - A". The Ships List.
- Titterton, G. A.; Brown, David (2002). The Royal Navy and the Mediterranean: September 1939 – October 1940. The Royal Navy and the Mediterranean (Republication of Naval Staff History of the Second World War). Vol. 1. London: Whitehall History Pub. ISBN 0-7146-5179-6. LCCN 2001047640.
