= San Juan Bautista State Historic Park =

- San Juan Bautista Plaza Historic District
- U.S. National Register of Historic Places
- U.S. National Historic Landmark District
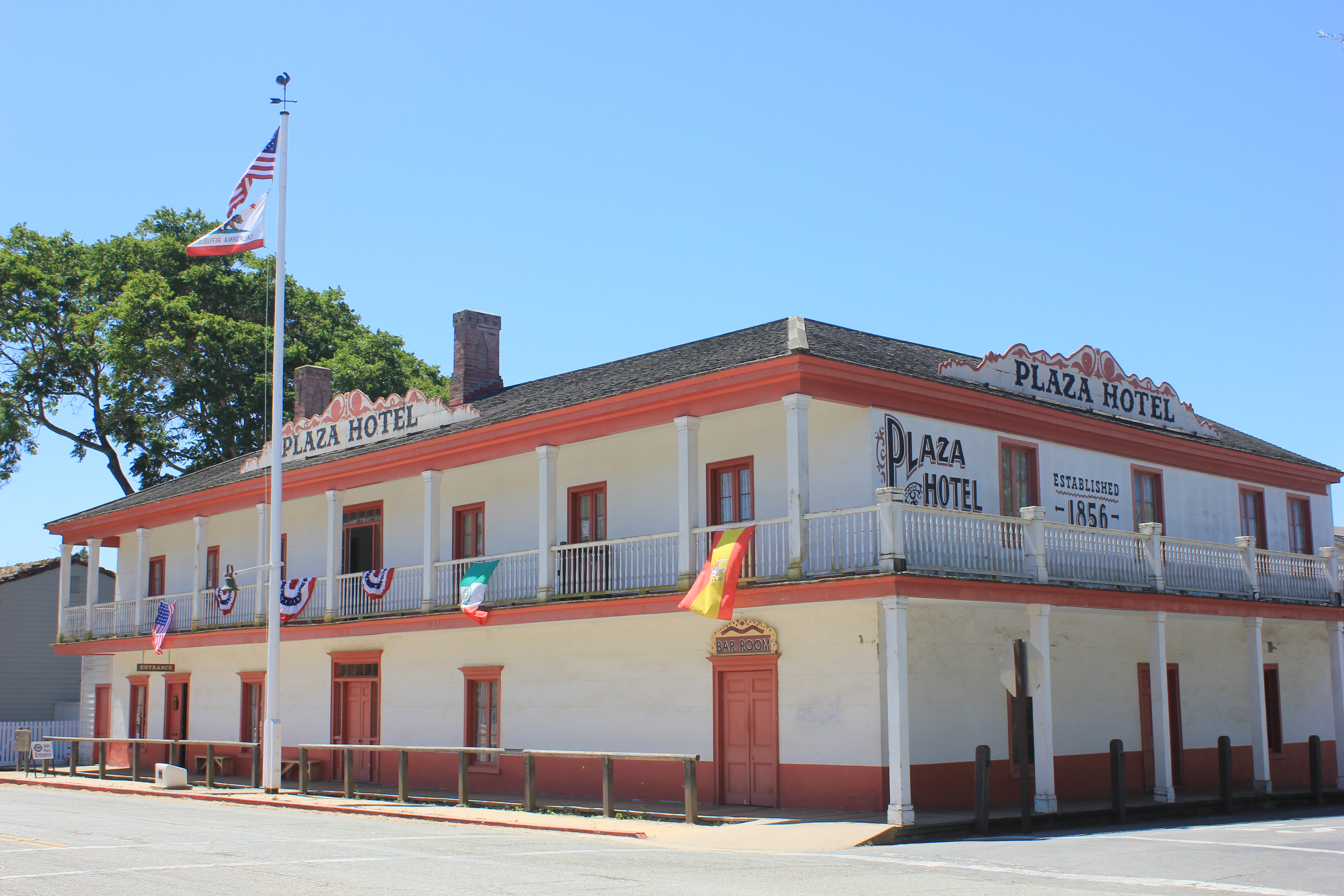
- The Plaza Hotel houses the state park's entrance and a museum

- Location within California Location within the United States
- Location: 2211 Garden Road, San Juan Bautista, California
- Coordinates: 36°50′44.02″N 121°32′4.4″W
- Area: 6 acres (2.4 ha)
- Built: 1797
- Architectural style: Colonial
- NRHP reference No.: 69000038

Significant dates
- Added to NRHP: December 8, 1969
- Designated NHLD: April 15, 1970

San Juan Bautista State Historic Park is a California state park encompassing the historic center of San Juan Bautista, California, United States. It preserves a significant concentration of buildings dating to California's period of Spanish and Mexican control. It includes the Plaza Hotel, the José Castro House, and several other buildings facing the historic plaza. It became a state park in 1933.

The park is part of the San Juan Bautista Plaza Historic District, along with the adjacent Mission San Juan Bautista and the Juan de Anza House southeast of the park. The district was declared a National Historic Landmark in 1970. It is also a site on the Juan Bautista de Anza National Historic Trail.

== History and features ==
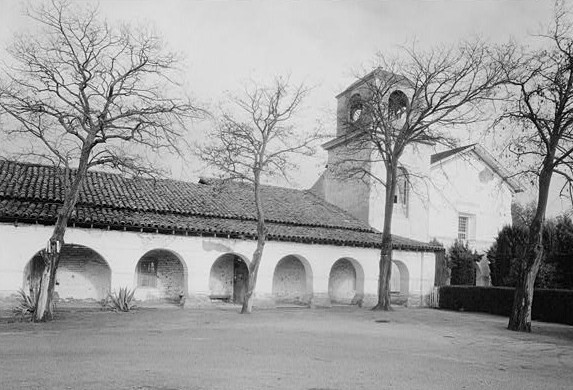
Mission San Juan Bautista in 1934

Mission San Juan Bautista was founded in 1797, as the 15th Spanish mission in what is now California. It was well sited for its intended purpose, the conversion of area Native Americans to Roman Catholicism, and was highly successful. The present mission church, still an active Catholic parish, was built in 1803–12, and is one of the largest of California's mission churches. The mission is not part of the state park but is adjacent to the plaza which is part of the state park.

Across the plaza from the mission is the Plaza Hotel, which was originally built in 1814 as a barracks for Spanish soldiers. Its second story was added in 1858, giving it a Monterey Colonial flavor. The hotel now houses a museum and the state park's entrance.

Following the independence of Mexico, the Spanish missions were secularized in 1833, and the village around the mission became a pueblo. On the southwest side of the plaza stands the adobe of interim Governor José Antonio Castro, one of the most important figures in California's Mexican period between 1835 and 1846. Built 1839–41, it is an architecturally important example of the Monterey Colonial style, and now functions as a museum within the state park.

One block southeast of the park is the Juan de Anza House, an adobe whose construction predates the rise of the Monterey Colonial style.

== See also ==
- List of California state parks
- List of National Historic Landmarks in California
- National Register of Historic Places listings in San Benito County, California
- California Historical Landmarks in San Benito County
