= Rozas House =

Historic house in California, United States

- U.S. National Register of Historic Places
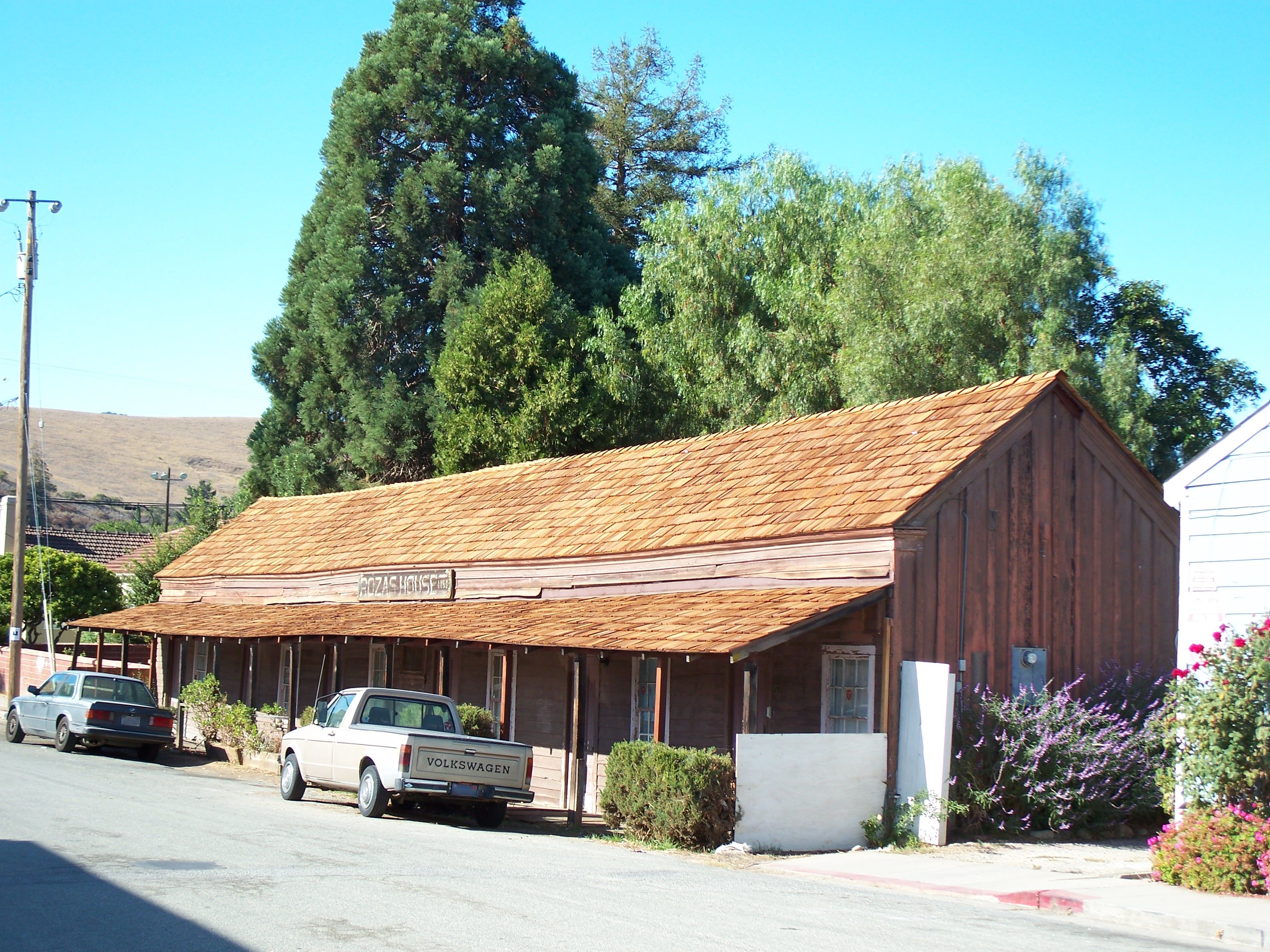

- Location within California Location within the United States
- Location: 31 Polk St., San Juan Bautista, California
- Coordinates: 36°50′41″N 121°32′17″W
- Area: less than one acre
- Built: 1856
- Architect: B. Sammit
- NRHP reference No.: 82002243
- Added to NRHP: April 12, 1982

The Rozas House is a historic house located at 31 Polk St. in San Juan Bautista, California, United States. The house, which was built in 1856, is long and narrow and consists of a series of rooms opening to the outside and an interior courtyard, an unusual style for wood-frame houses. Ambrozio Rozas Sr., purchased the house soon after its construction; his son, Ambrozio Rozas Jr., and his family occupied the house. Rozas Jr., lived in San Juan Bautista for the rest of his life; after his death, his wife Emelda Lugo Rozas occupied the house until 1950.

The Rozas House was added to the National Register of Historic Places in 1982.

== See also ==
- California Historical Landmarks in San Benito County
- Plaza Hotel
- José Castro House
