= Juan de Anza House =

Historic house in California, United States

- U.S. National Register of Historic Places
- U.S. National Historic Landmark
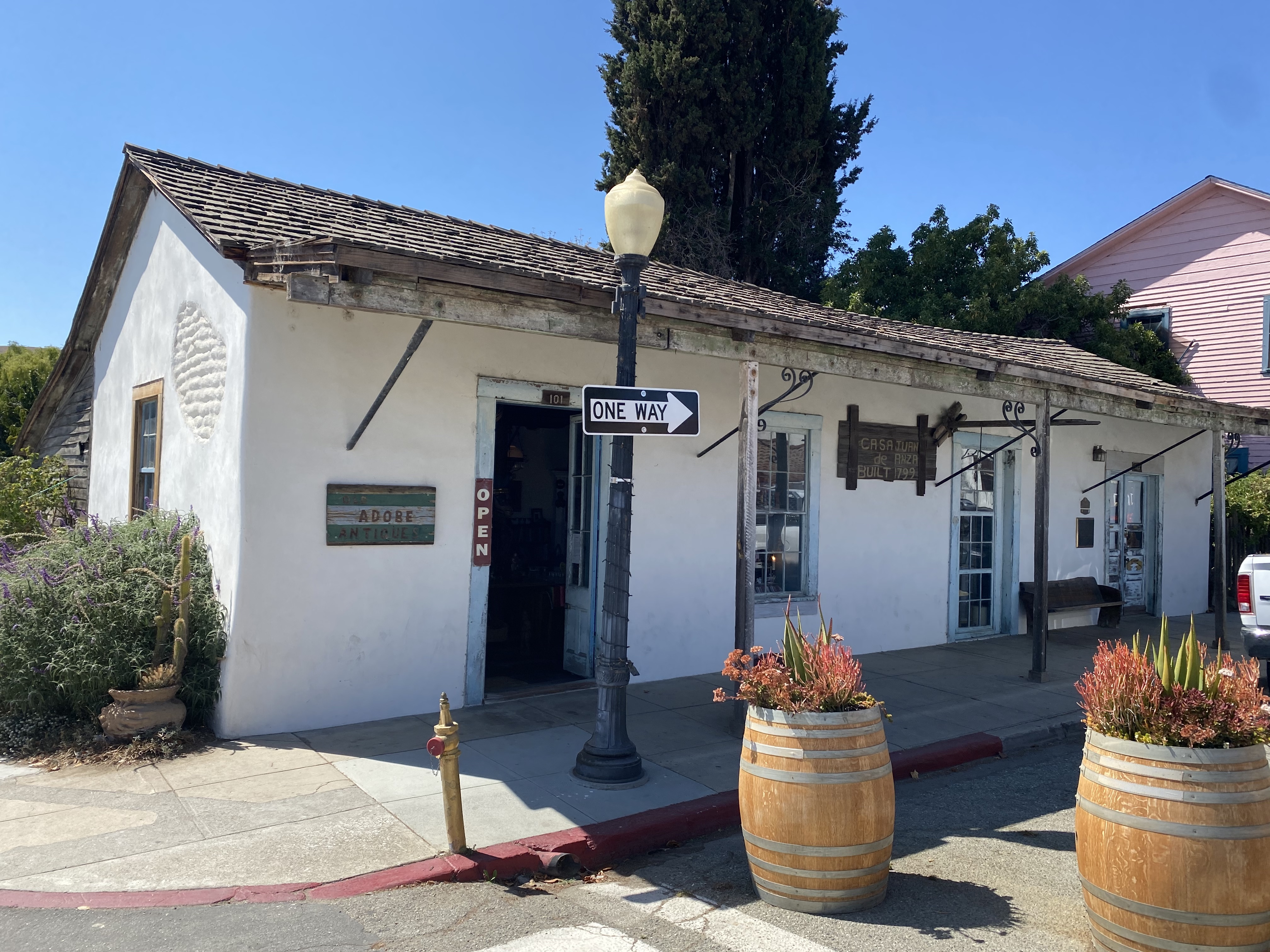

- Location within California Location within the United States
- Location: Franklin and 3rd streets, San Juan Bautista, California
- Coordinates: 36°50′37.04″N 121°32′8.10″W
- Area: 0.25 acres (0.10 ha)
- Built: c. 1830
- Architect: Juan de Anza
- NRHP reference No.: 70000140

Significant dates
- Added to NRHP: April 15, 1970
- Designated NHL: April 15, 1970

The Juan de Anza House (Spanish: Casa Juan de Anza), also known as the Casa de Anza (English: Anza House), is a historic adobe house in San Juan Bautista, California. Built around 1830, Casa de Anza is a well-preserved example of residential construction from the period of Mexican California. It was declared a National Historic Landmark in 1970.

== History ==
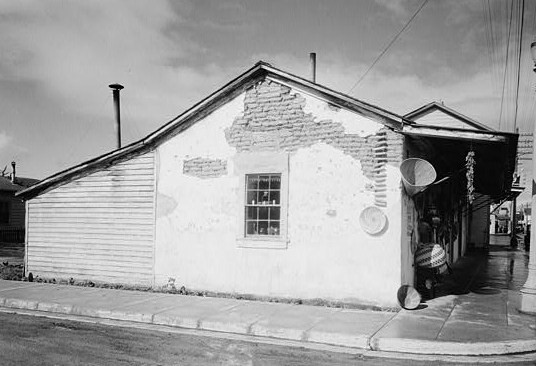
Casa de Anza in 1932.

The house was probably built about 1835, during the period when California was part of Mexico, and after the Mission San Juan Bautista was secularized. Its construction methods clearly predate developments in the late 1830s, when American methods of frame construction began to be merged into the Mexican vernacular adobe style.

In the 1870s Francisco Bravo adapted the building for commercial use as a cantina, and it has generally been used for commercial purposes since then.

== Description ==
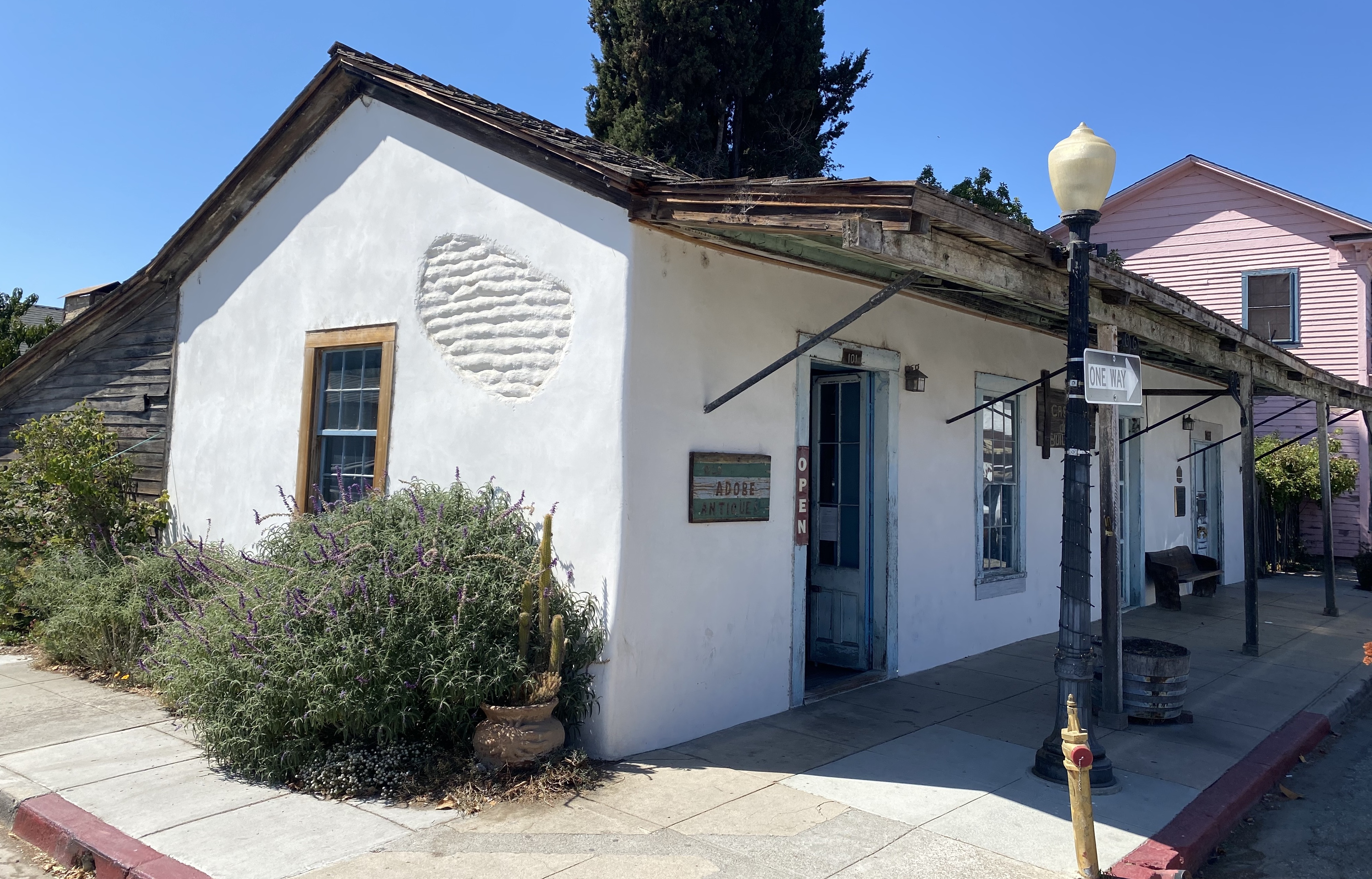
Casa de Anza in 2021.

Casa Juan de Anza is located in the downtown area of San Juan Bautista, at the southwest corner of Franklin and Third streets. It is a single-story adobe structure, built out of vertically placed wooden poles and mud bricks, with exterior and interior finishes of lime plaster.

It is covered by a low-pitch gabled roof with redwood shingles, which extends across an open veranda extending the width of the building, supported by simple square wooden posts. It has four bays on the front, three of which are occupied by doors or full-height windows. A wood-frame addition extends across the full width of the rear, covered by a shed roof. The interior has five rooms, some of which have 19th-century redwood floors.

== See also ==
- National Register of Historic Places listings in San Benito County, California
- Plaza Hotel
- California Historical Landmarks in San Benito County
