= National Register of Historic Places listings in San Benito County, California =

Location of San Benito County in California

This is a list of the National Register of Historic Places listings in San Benito County, California.

This is intended to be a complete list of the properties and districts on the National Register of Historic Places in San Benito County, California, United States. Latitude and longitude coordinates are provided for many National Register properties and districts; these locations may be seen together in an online map.

There are 15 properties and districts listed on the National Register in the county, including 3 National Historic Landmarks.

This National Park Service list is complete through NPS recent listings posted September 4, 2026.

== Current listings ==
| | Name on the Register | Image | Date listed | Location | City or town | Description |
|---|---|---|---|---|---|---|
| 1 | Anza House | Anza House | April 15, 1970 (#70000140) | 3rd and Franklin Sts. 36°50′37″N 121°32′08″W | San Juan Bautista | Also known as Juan de Anza House |
| 2 | Bear Valley School | Bear Valley School | June 2, 2014 (#14000267) | East side of Highway 25, 1 mile (1.6 km) north of junction with Highway 146; 36°32′03″N 121°08′49″W | Paicines | |
| 3 | Jose Castro House | Jose Castro House | April 15, 1970 (#70000141) | S side of the Plaza; 36°50′41″N 121°32′05″W | San Juan Bautista | |
| 4 | Chalone Creek Archeological Sites | | August 31, 1978 (#78000365) | Address Restricted | Soledad | |
| 5 | Downtown Hollister Historic District | Downtown Hollister Historic District | August 14, 1992 (#92000974) | Roughly bounded by Fourth, East, South and Monterey Sts. 36°51′00″N 121°24′03″W | Hollister | |
| 6 | Joel and Rena Hawkins House | Joel and Rena Hawkins House | July 28, 1993 (#93000669) | 801 South St. 36°50′54″N 121°24′32″W | Hollister | |
| 7 | Hollister Carnegie Library | Hollister Carnegie Library | March 26, 1992 (#92000269) | 375 Fifth St. 36°51′04″N 121°24′08″W | Hollister | |
| 8 | Harrison Lyons Homestead Historic District | | August 15, 2016 (#16000521) | Address Restricted | Paicines | |
| 9 | Marentis House | Marentis House | September 13, 1984 (#84000951) | 45 Monterey St. 36°50′47″N 121°32′29″W | San Juan Bautista | |
| 10 | Roy D. McCallum House | Roy D. McCallum House | November 24, 1997 (#97001445) | 1401 San Benito St. 36°50′25″N 121°24′03″W | Hollister | |
| 11 | Monterey Street Historic District | Monterey Street Historic District | January 7, 1993 (#92001740) | Monterey St. and intersecting streets between 5th and B Sts. 36°50′50″N 121°24′12″W | Hollister | |
| 12 | Rozas House | Rozas House | April 12, 1982 (#82002243) | 31 Polk St. 36°50′42″N 121°32′17″W | San Juan Bautista | |
| 13 | San Juan Bautista Plaza Historic District | San Juan Bautista Plaza Historic District | December 8, 1969 (#69000038) | Buildings surrounding plaza at Washington, Mariposa, and 2nd Sts. 36°50′44″N 121°32′04″W | San Juan Bautista | |
| 14 | San Juan Bautista Third Street Historic District | San Juan Bautista Third Street Historic District | January 9, 2009 (#08001277) | 3rd St. between 406 3rd St. and Franklin St. 36°50′40″N 121°32′12″W | San Juan Bautista | |
| 15 | Benjamin Wilcox House | Benjamin Wilcox House | February 19, 1982 (#82002244) | 315 The Alameda; 36°50′25″N 121°32′01″W | San Juan Bautista | Gothic Revival house from 1858, on the El Camino Real. |

== See also ==
- List of National Historic Landmarks in California
- National Register of Historic Places listings in California
- California Historical Landmarks in San Benito County, California
