= San Juan Bautista, California =

City in California, United States

- City
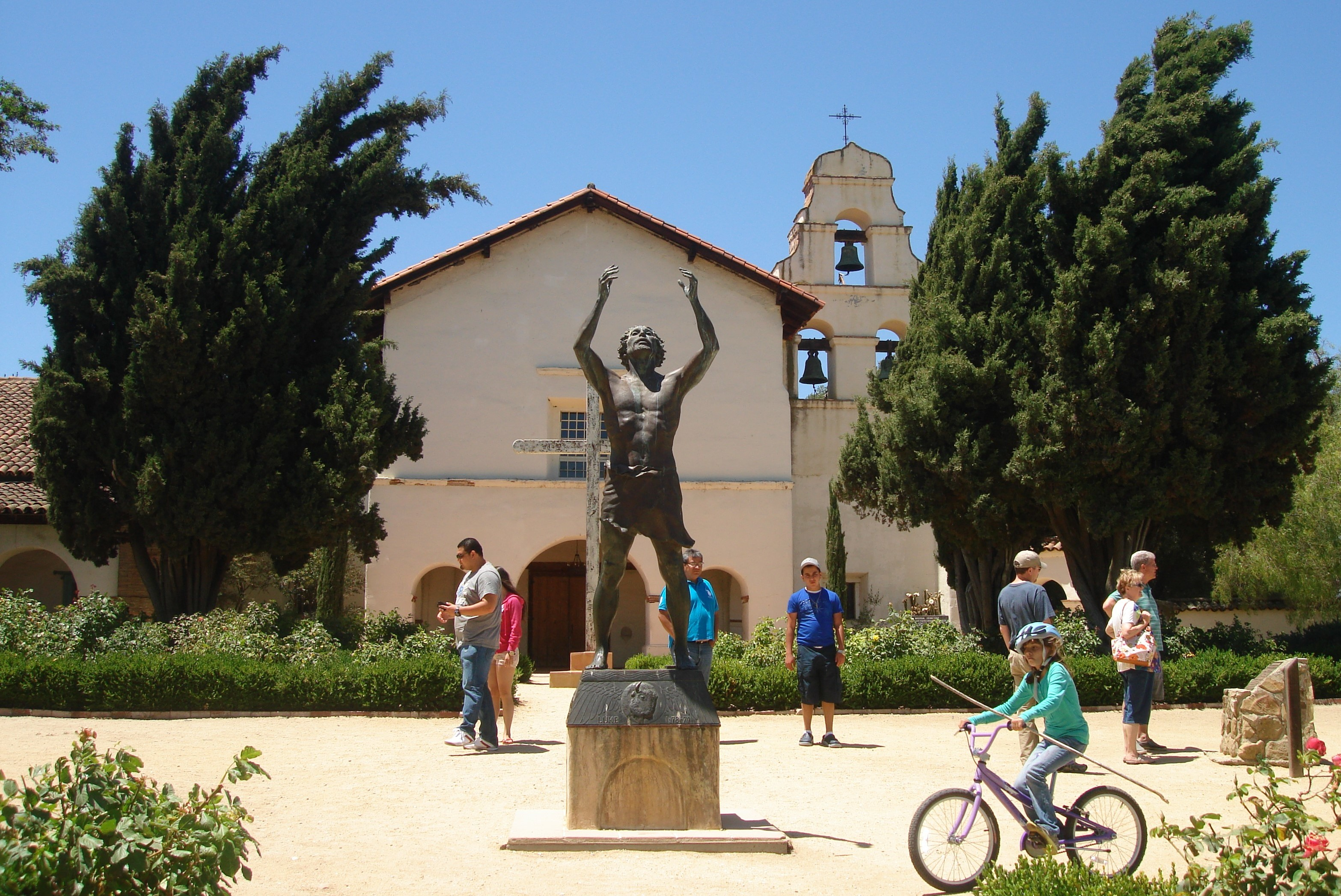
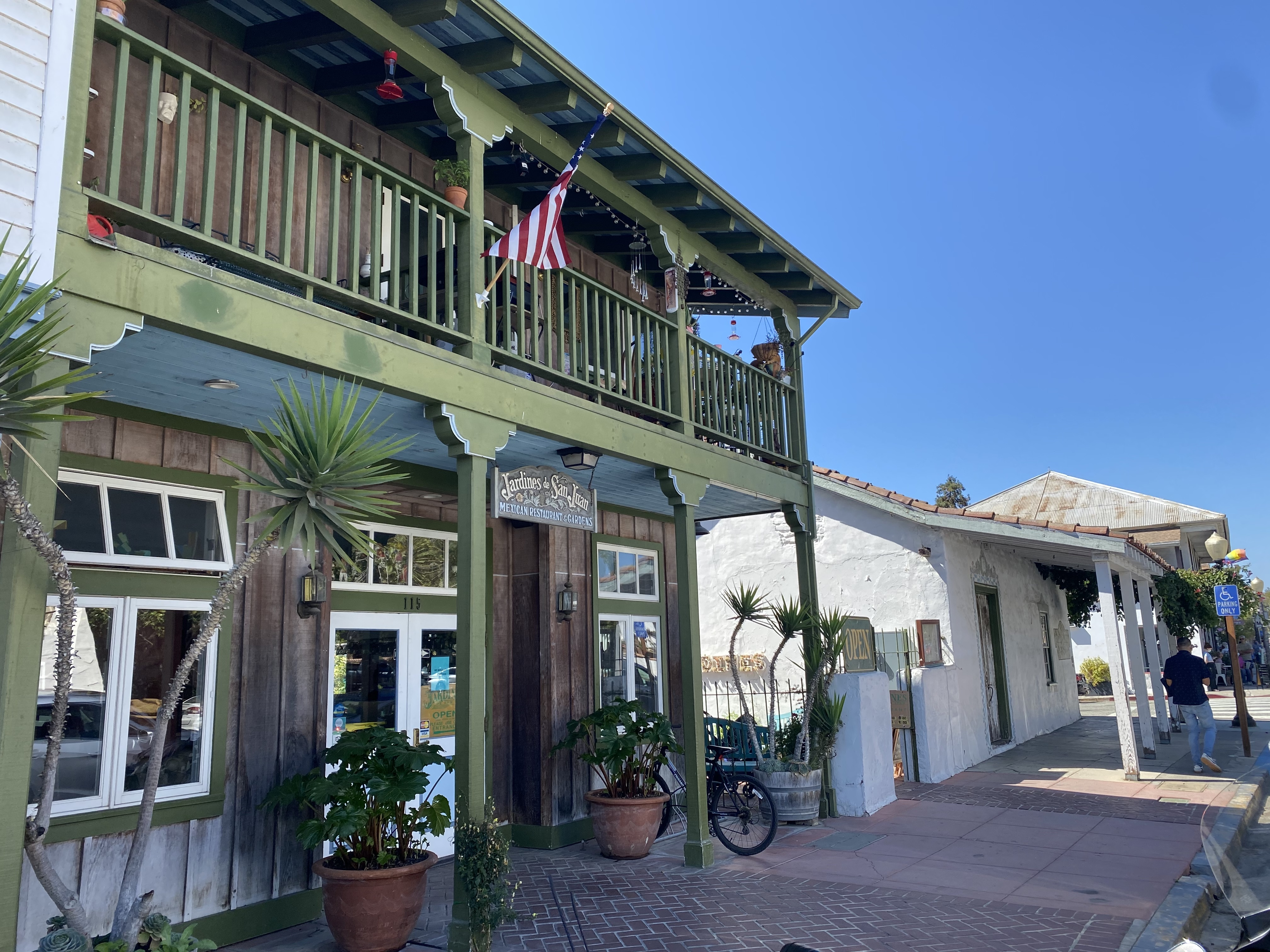
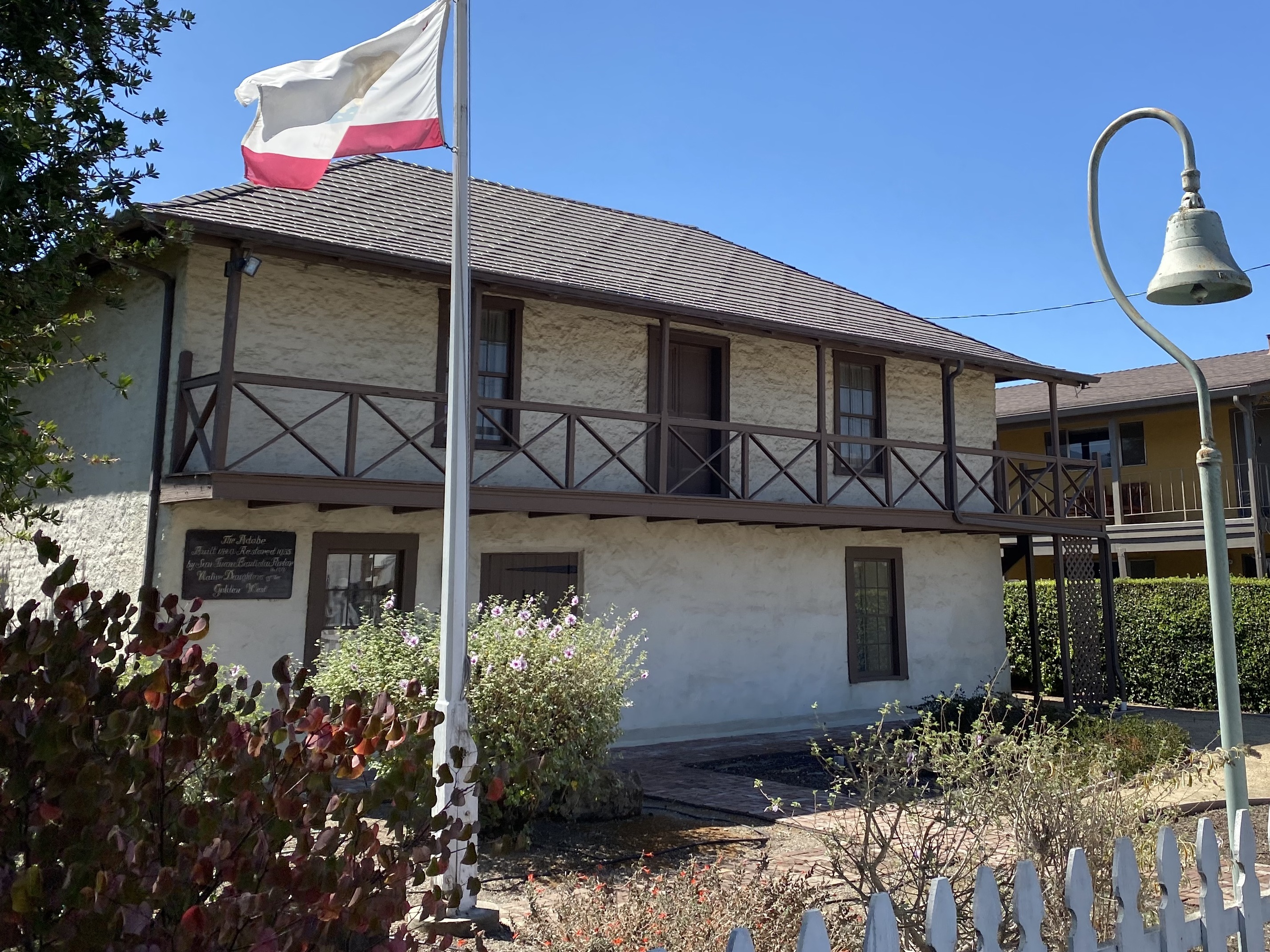
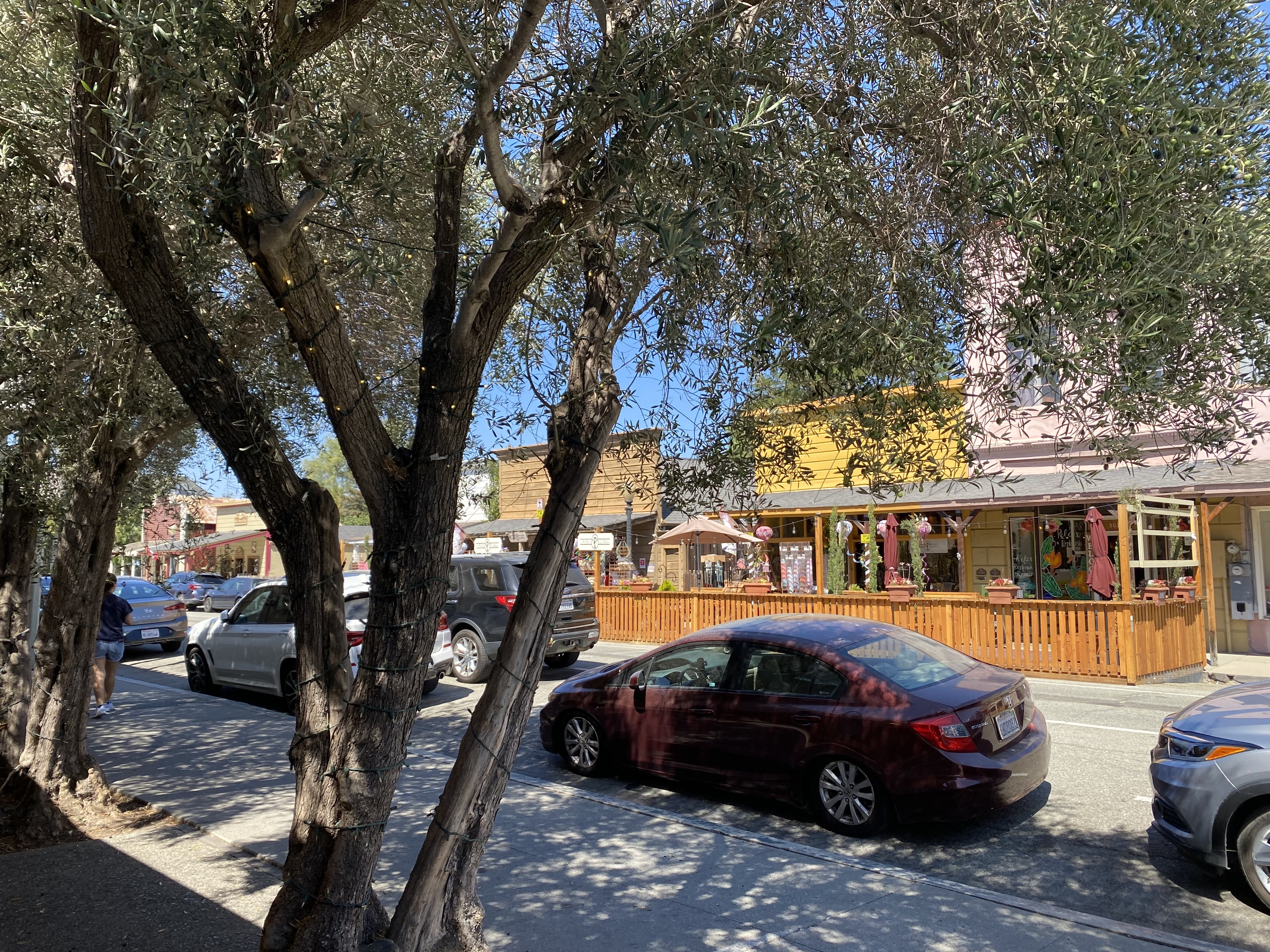
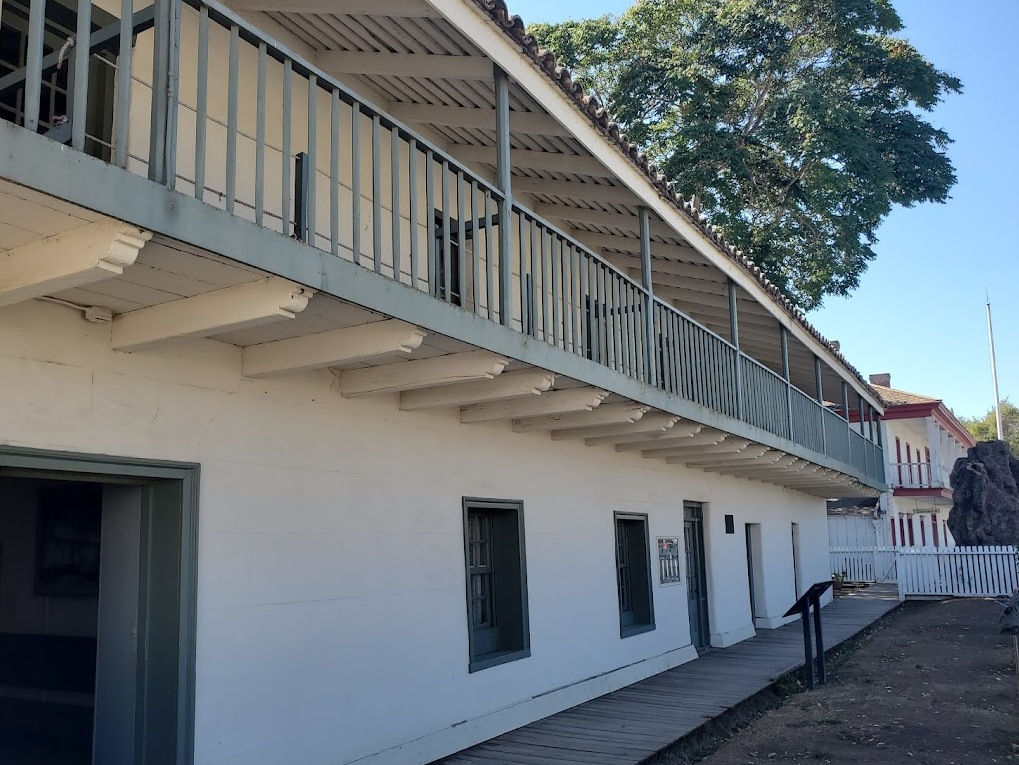
- Clockwise: Mission San Juan Bautista; the Pico-Boronda Adobe; José Castro House; Downtown San Juan Bautista; Jardines de San Juan.

- Seal
- Motto: City of History
- Interactive map of San Juan Bautista, California
- Location in the United States
- Coordinates: 36°50′39″N 121°32′14″W
- Country: United States
- State: California
- County: San Benito
- Incorporated: May 4, 1869
- Named for: Saint John the Baptist

Government
  - Mayor: Leslie Q. Jordan
  - City Manager: Ashley Collick

Area
  - Total: 0.78 sq mi (2.03 km^{2})
  - Land: 0.78 sq mi (2.03 km^{2})
  - Water: 0 sq mi (0.00 km^{2}) 0%
- Elevation: 217 ft (66 m)

Population (2020)
  - Total: 2,089
  - Density: 2,681.4/sq mi (1,035.29/km^{2})
- Time zone: UTC-8 (Pacific)
  - Summer (DST): UTC-7 (PDT)
- ZIP code: 95045
- Area code: 831
- FIPS code: 06-68014
- GNIS feature IDs: 1659581, 2411792
- Website: www.san-juan-bautista.ca.us

San Juan Bautista (Spanish for "Saint John the Baptist") is a city in San Benito County, California, United States. The population was 2,089 as of the 2020 census. San Juan Bautista was founded in 1797 by the Spanish under Fermín de Lasuén, with the establishment of Mission San Juan Bautista. Following the Mexican secularization of 1833, the town was briefly known as San Juan de Castro and eventually incorporated in 1896. Today, San Juan is a tourist destination, as the home of the San Juan Bautista State Historic Park and other historic sites, as well as cultural institutions like El Teatro Campesino.

== History ==
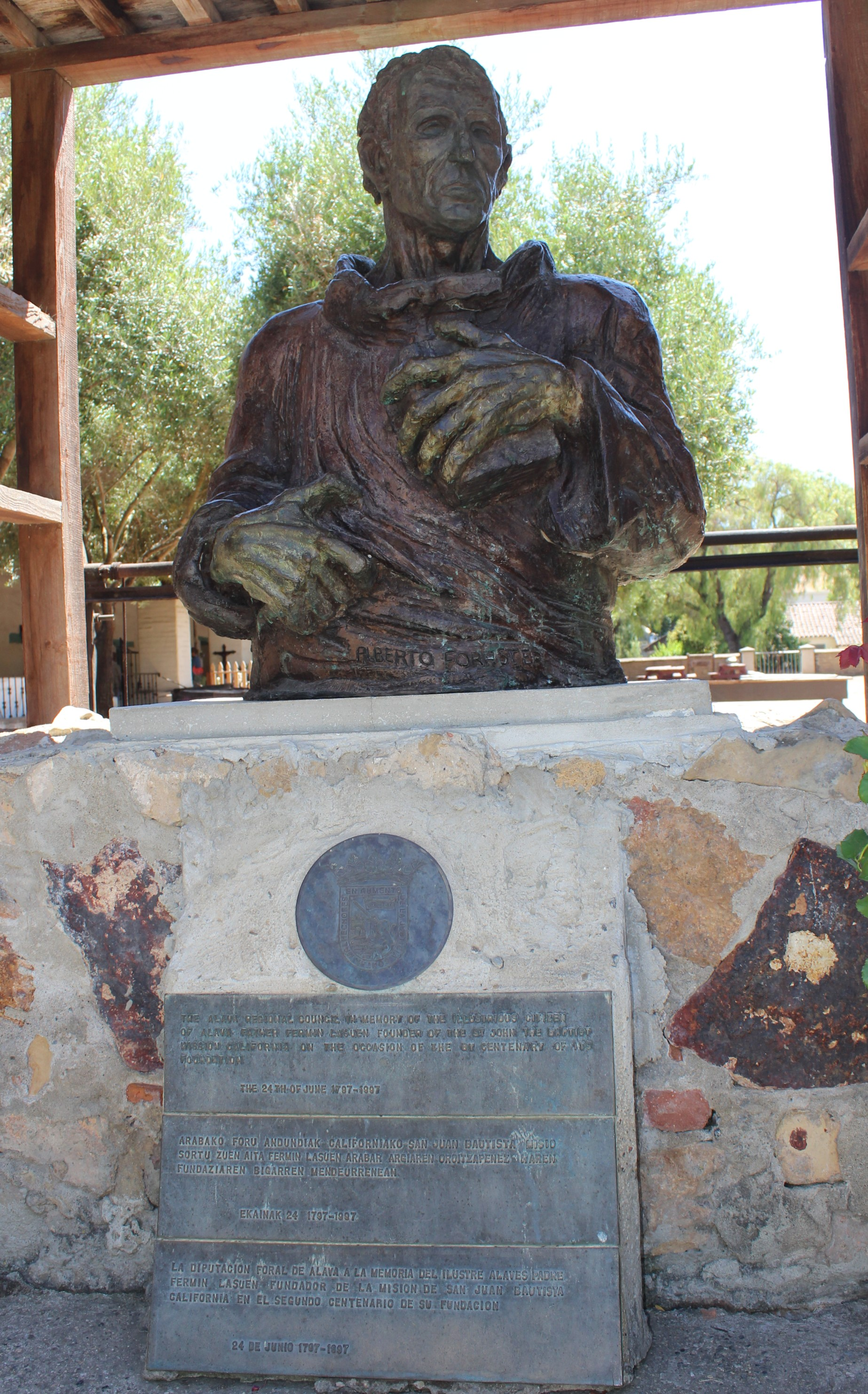
Statue of Fermín de Lasuén, founder of San Juan Bautista.

Prior to the arrival of Europeans, the area around San Juan Bautista was populated by the Mutsun, a tribe of the Ohlone Nation of Indigenous Californians. The Mutsuns lived in villages in the area around San Juan Bautista, in settlements composed of thatched huts made of willow and native grasses.

=== Spanish period ===
In 1797, the Spanish Franciscan priest fray Fermín de Lasuén founded Mission San Juan Bautista to facilitate the conversion of the native people to Catholicism; in the process, he claimed the land for the Spanish Empire. Lasuén chose the site because of the area's fertile cropland, steady water supply, and sizable Indian population.

Construction of the current mission church began in 1803, and it has served the community continuously since 1812. The mission was located on the Camino Real, a "royal highway" which connected the California missions and which remained well-used until the 19th century.

=== Mexican period ===
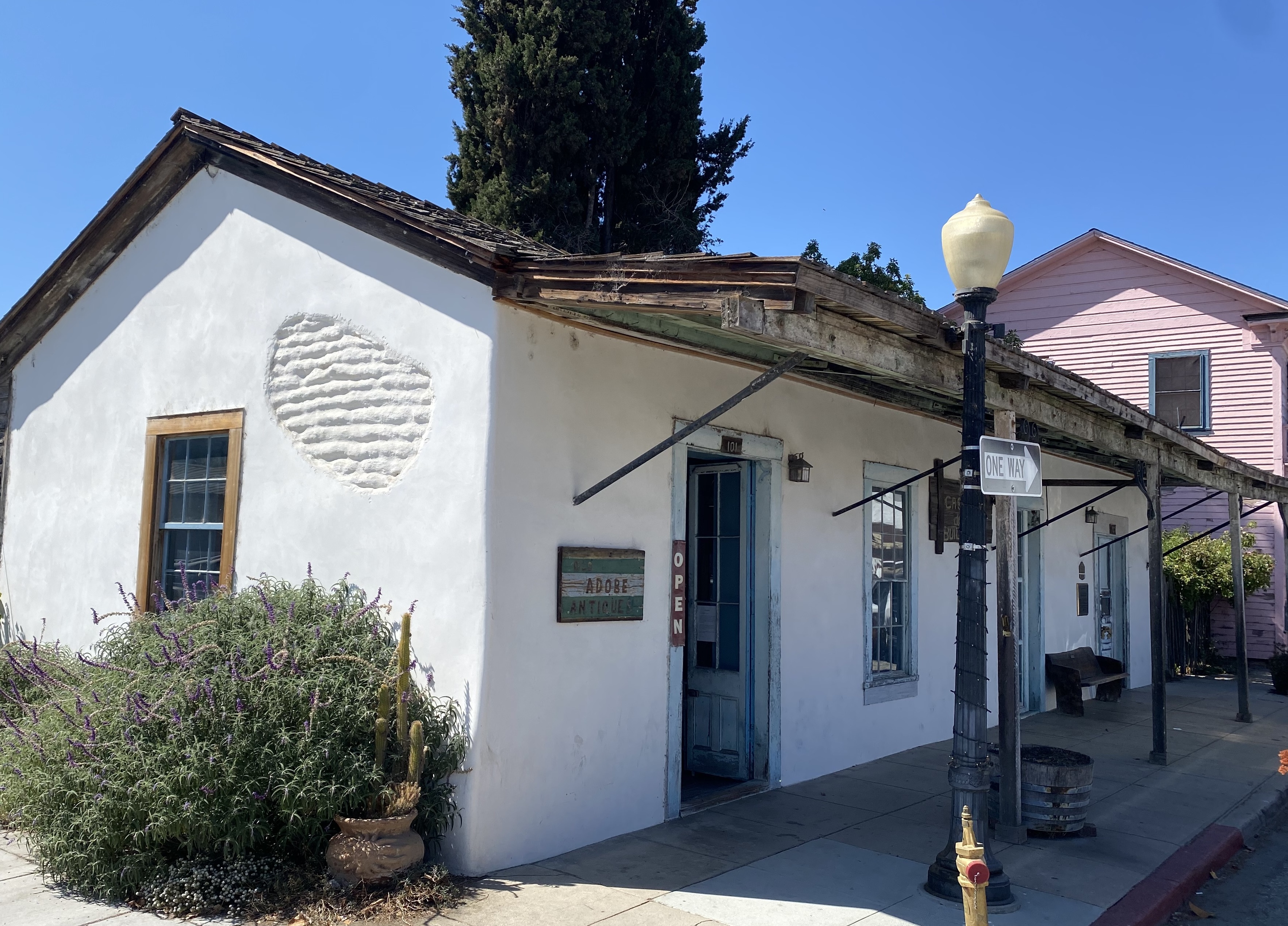
Casa Juan de Anza, built in 1830, is the oldest residence in San Juan.

In 1821, Mexico revolted against Spain, winning independence for itself, and making California a province of the newly independent Mexico. By 1834, a town known as San Juan de Castro had sprouted around the mission. It drew its name from the town's prominent alcalde José Tiburcio Castro. In 1834 the mission was secularized, and Castro appointed executor of the property. Accordingly, he divided and auctioned off the former mission properties. His son, José Castro, built the Castro Adobe on the south side of the Plaza de San Juan in 1840; however, Castro's frequent involvement in government kept him from spending much time there. Castro was a key member of the overthrow of governors Nicolás Gutiérrez in 1836 and Manuel Micheltorena in 1844.

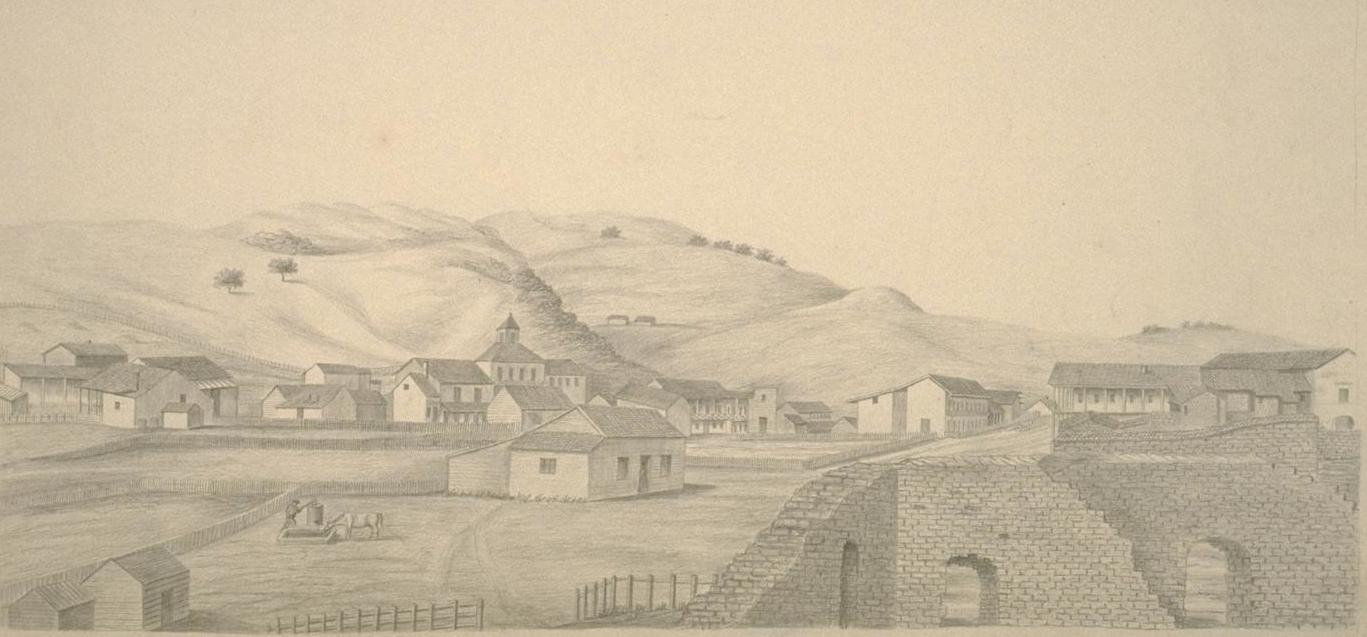
View of San Juan Bautista in 1856.

After defeating Micheltorena and his ill-equipped army, José Antonio Castro was appointed Comandante General of California, in charge of the Mexican Army's operations in California. From San Juan Bautista, Castro ordered the army against potential foreign incursions. He kept especially close watch over the movements of John C. Frémont, an American military officer who had been let into California to conduct a survey of the interior. Though given explicit instructions to stay away from coastal settlements, Frémont soon broke the agreement by taking his team to Monterey, a potential military target. When Castro told Frémont he would have to leave the country, the situation came close to war when he obstinately refused to leave and instead set up a base on Gavilán Peak, overlooking the town of San Juan. However, fighting was avoided and Frémont, grudgingly, withdrew.

=== American period ===
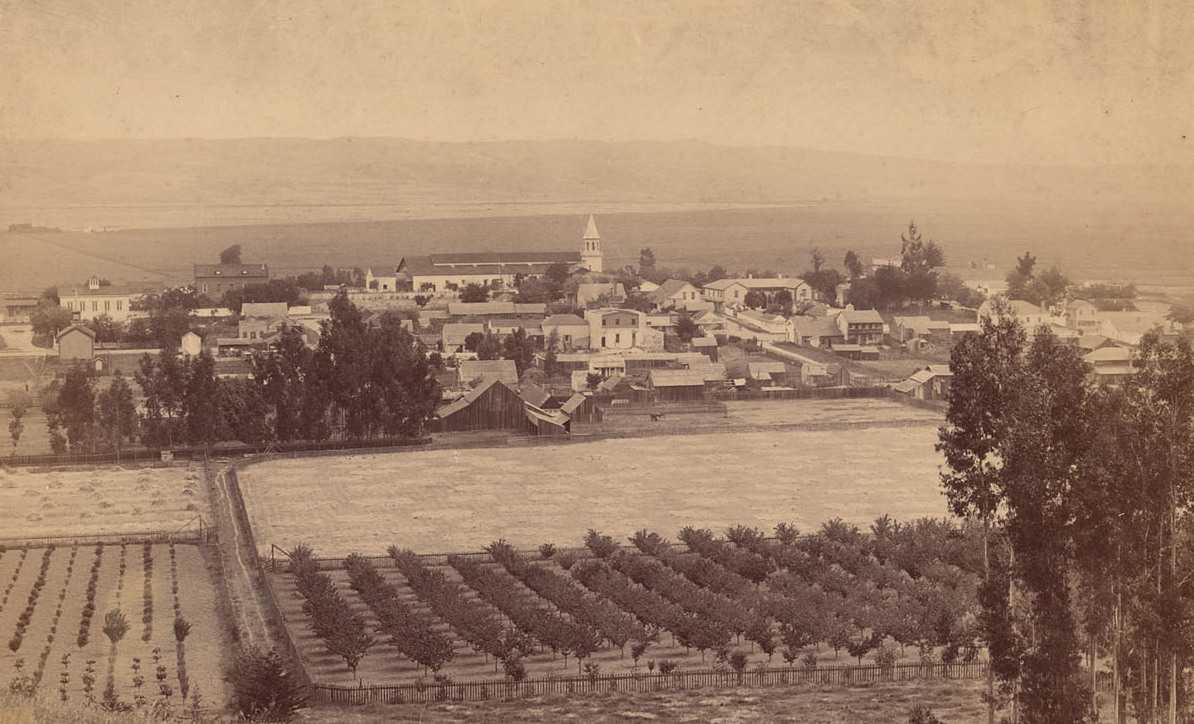
View of San Juan Bautista in 1905.

San Juan Bautista incorporated as a city on May 4, 1896.

In June 1904, early aviation pioneer John J. Montgomery made a series of successful test flights using his tandem-wing glider in San Juan. This was a prototype to his 1905 gliders that were the first in the world to make successful high-altitude flights in heavier-than-air flying machines.

In 1930, the last native speaker of Mutsun, Ascención Solórzano de Cervantes, died, rendering the Mutsun language extinct.

In 1971, Luis Valdez moved El Teatro Campesino, one of the most important cultural institutions of the Chicano Movement, to San Juan Bautista. Initially, they only had use of La Calavera Theatre, but eventually also built out a larger theatre, simply known as El Teatro Campesino.

Recently, using old photographs and eyewitness accounts, researchers were able to estimate the location of the hypocenter of the 1906 San Francisco earthquake as offshore from San Francisco, or near the city of San Juan Bautista, confirming previous estimates.

== Geography ==
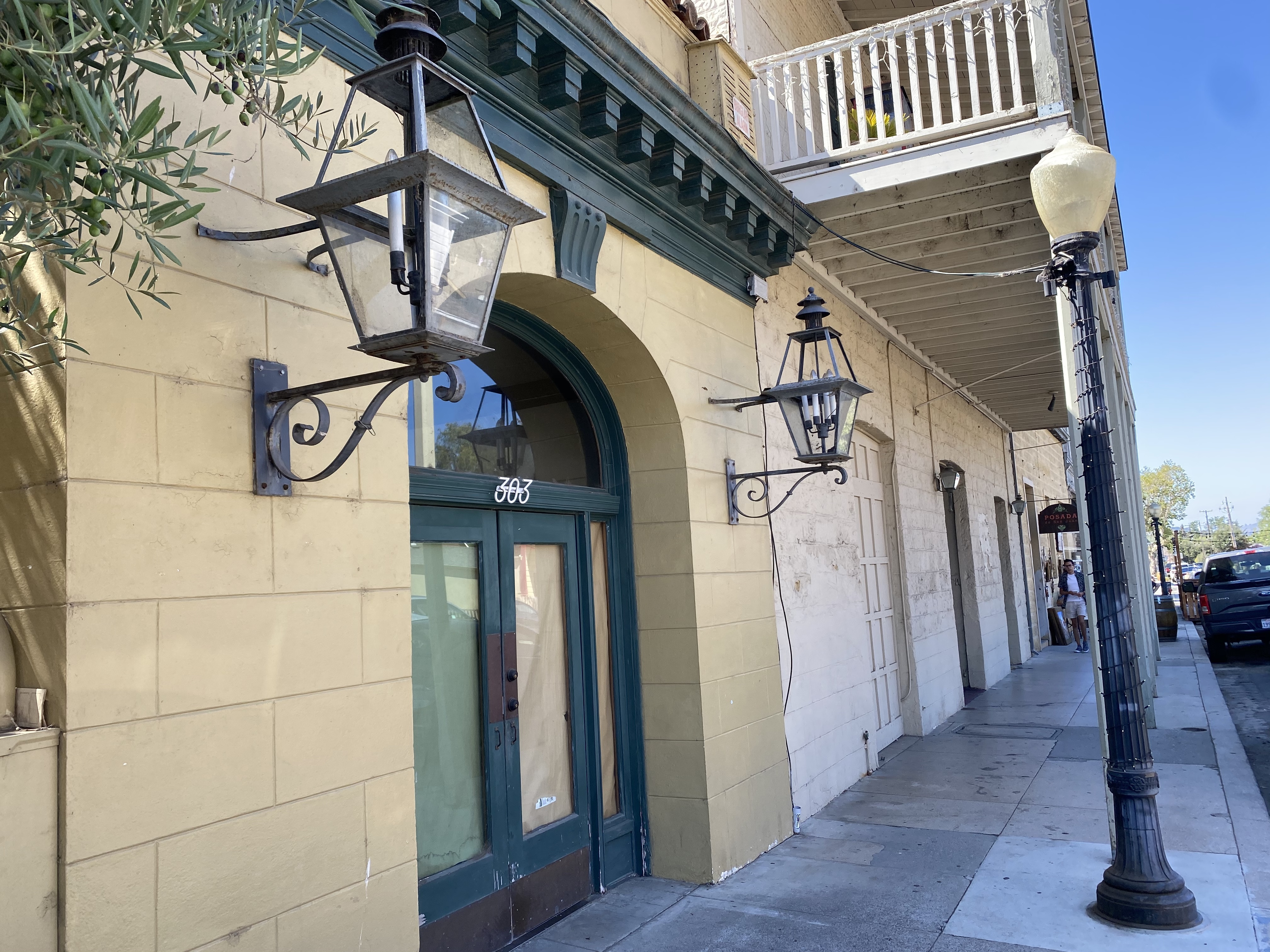
Downtown San Juan Bautista

According to the United States Census Bureau, the city has a total area of 0.8 square miles (2.1 km^{2}), all land.

The Gabilán Range is to the south of San Juan Bautista. The San Andreas Fault runs through San Juan Bautista. The summit of Fremont Peak, overlooking the town of San Juan, is open to the public as Fremont Peak State Park.

=== Climate ===
This region experiences warm (but not hot) and dry summers, with no average monthly temperatures above 71.6 °F (22.0 °C). According to the Köppen Climate Classification system, San Juan Bautista has a warm-summer Mediterranean climate, abbreviated "Csb" on climate maps.

== Demographics ==
Historical population
Census	Pop.	Note	%±
1880	484		—
1890	463		−4.3%
1900	449		−3.0%
1910	326		−27.4%
1920	501		53.7%
1930	772		54.1%
1940	678		−12.2%
1950	1,031		52.1%
1960	1,046		1.5%
1970	1,164		11.3%
1980	1,276		9.6%
1990	1,570		23.0%
2000	1,549		−1.3%
2010	1,862		20.2%
2020	2,089		12.2%
U.S. Decennial Census; 1860–1870 1880-1890; 1900 1910 1920; 1930 1940 1950; 1960 1970 1980; 1990 2000 2010; 2020

=== 2020 census ===
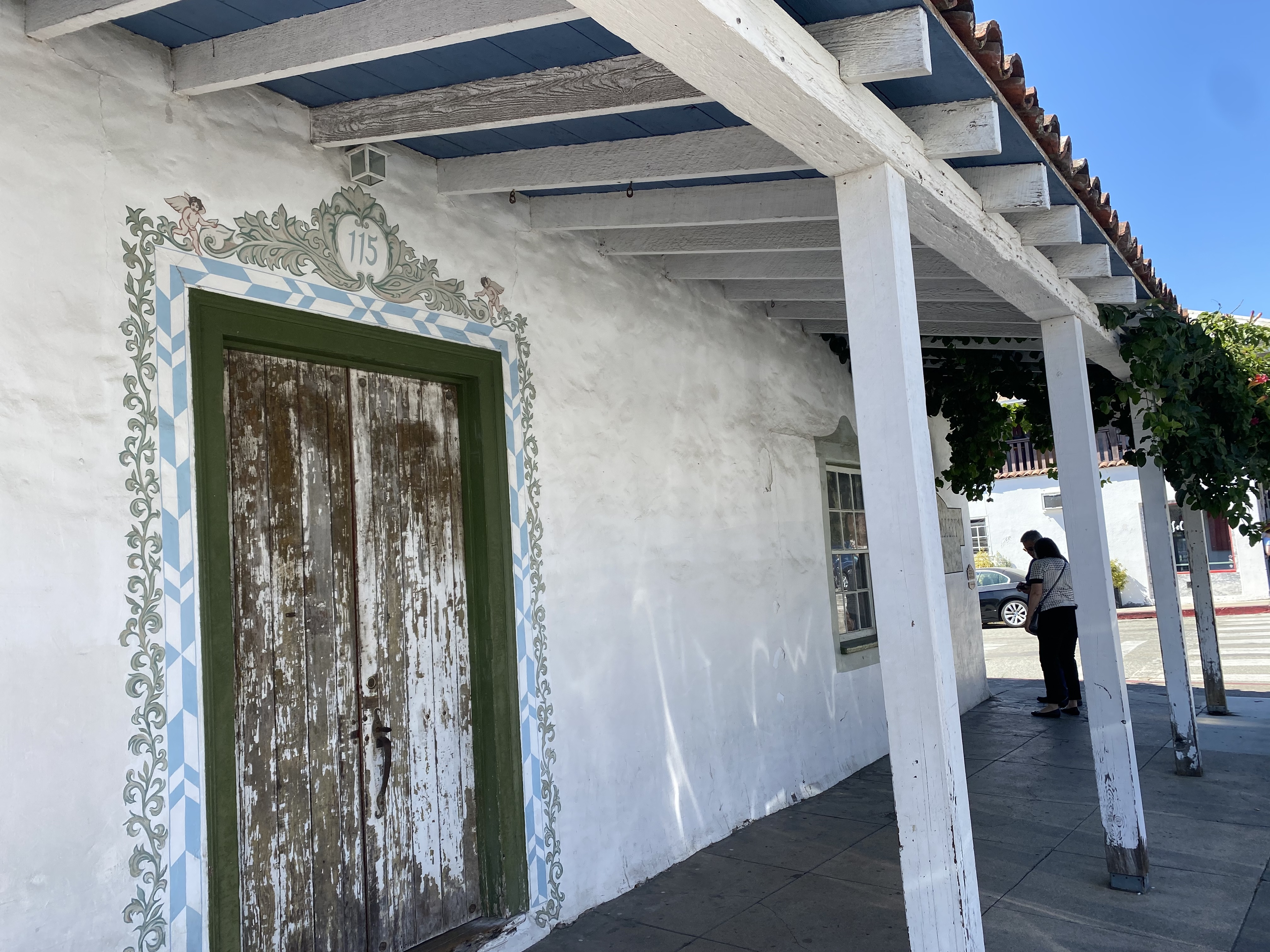
The Vache Adobe, built in 1856, now hosts the Santana Gallery.

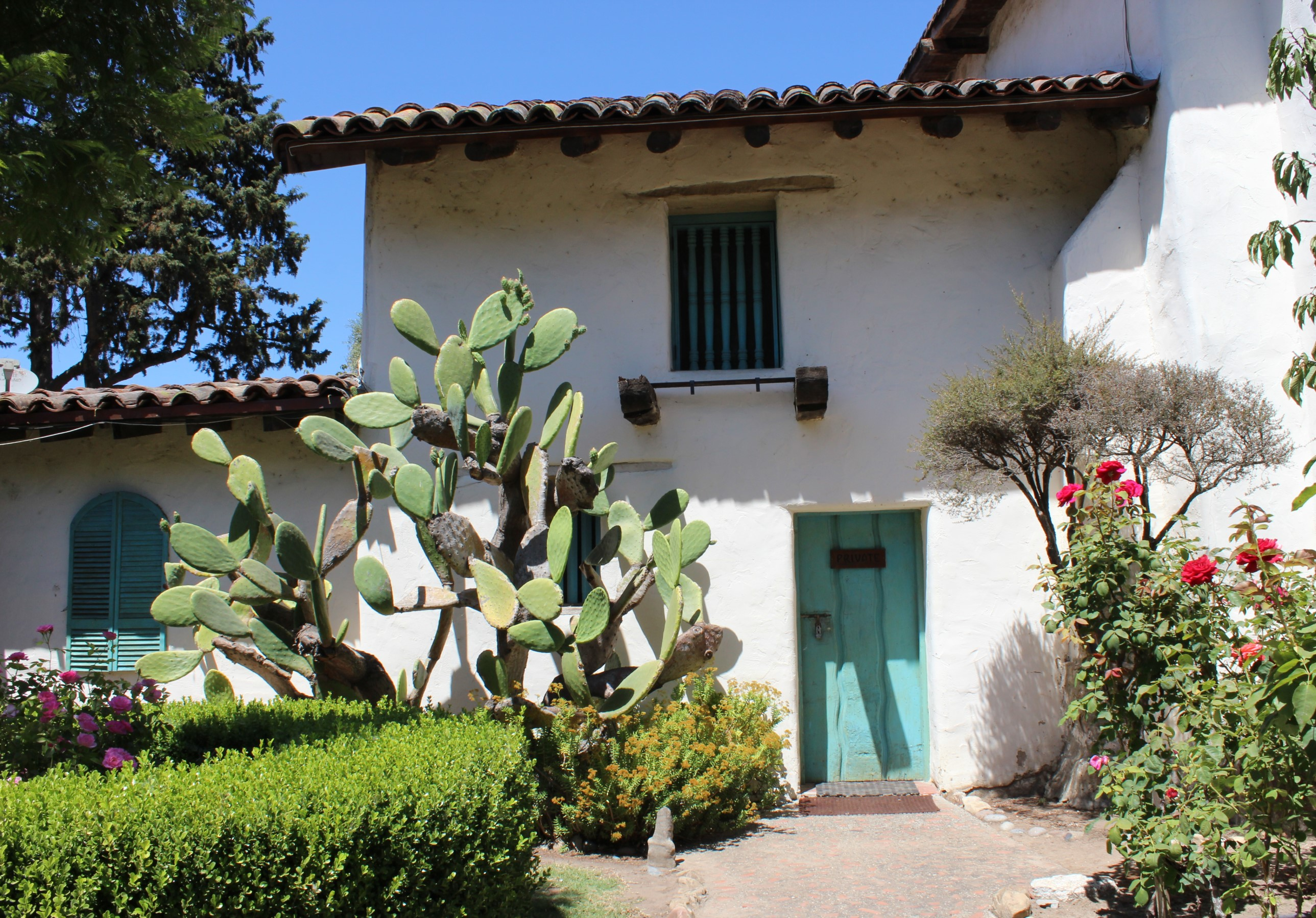
The former padre's residence at Mission San Juan Bautista

As of the 2020 census, San Juan Bautista had a population of 2,089, and the population density was 2,661.1 inhabitants per square mile (1,027.5/km^{2}). 100.0% lived in rural areas.

Racial composition as of the 2020 census
Race	Number	Percent
White	930	44.5%
Black or African American	22	1.1%
American Indian and Alaska Native	95	4.5%
Asian	89	4.3%
Native Hawaiian and Other Pacific Islander	4	0.2%
Some other race	582	27.9%
Two or more races	367	17.6%
Hispanic or Latino (of any race)	1,151	55.1%

The census reported that 99.6% of the population lived in households, 0.4% lived in non-institutionalized group quarters, and no one was institutionalized.

There were 795 households in San Juan Bautista, of which 35.6% had children under the age of 18 living in them. Of all households, 48.2% were married-couple households, 10.2% were cohabiting-couple households, 19.2% were households with a male householder and no spouse or partner present, and 22.4% were households with a female householder and no spouse or partner present. About 18.9% of all households were made up of individuals and 7.1% had someone living alone who was 65 years of age or older. The average household size was 2.62. There were 558 families (70.2% of all households).

The age distribution was 19.6% under the age of 18, 8.2% aged 18 to 24, 29.6% aged 25 to 44, 24.6% aged 45 to 64, and 18.0% who were 65 years of age or older. The median age was 40.2 years. For every 100 females, there were 101.8 males, and for every 100 females age 18 and over there were 101.1 males age 18 and over.

There were 903 housing units at an average density of 1,150.3 units per square mile (444.1 units/km^{2}), of which 795 (88.0%) were occupied. Of these, 52.2% were owner-occupied, and 47.8% were occupied by renters. Of all housing units, 12.0% were vacant. The homeowner vacancy rate was 5.2% and the rental vacancy rate was 5.9%.

=== Income and poverty ===
In 2023, the US Census Bureau estimated that the median household income was $108,750, and the per capita income was $49,421. About 5.0% of families and 8.8% of the population were below the poverty line.

=== 2010 census ===
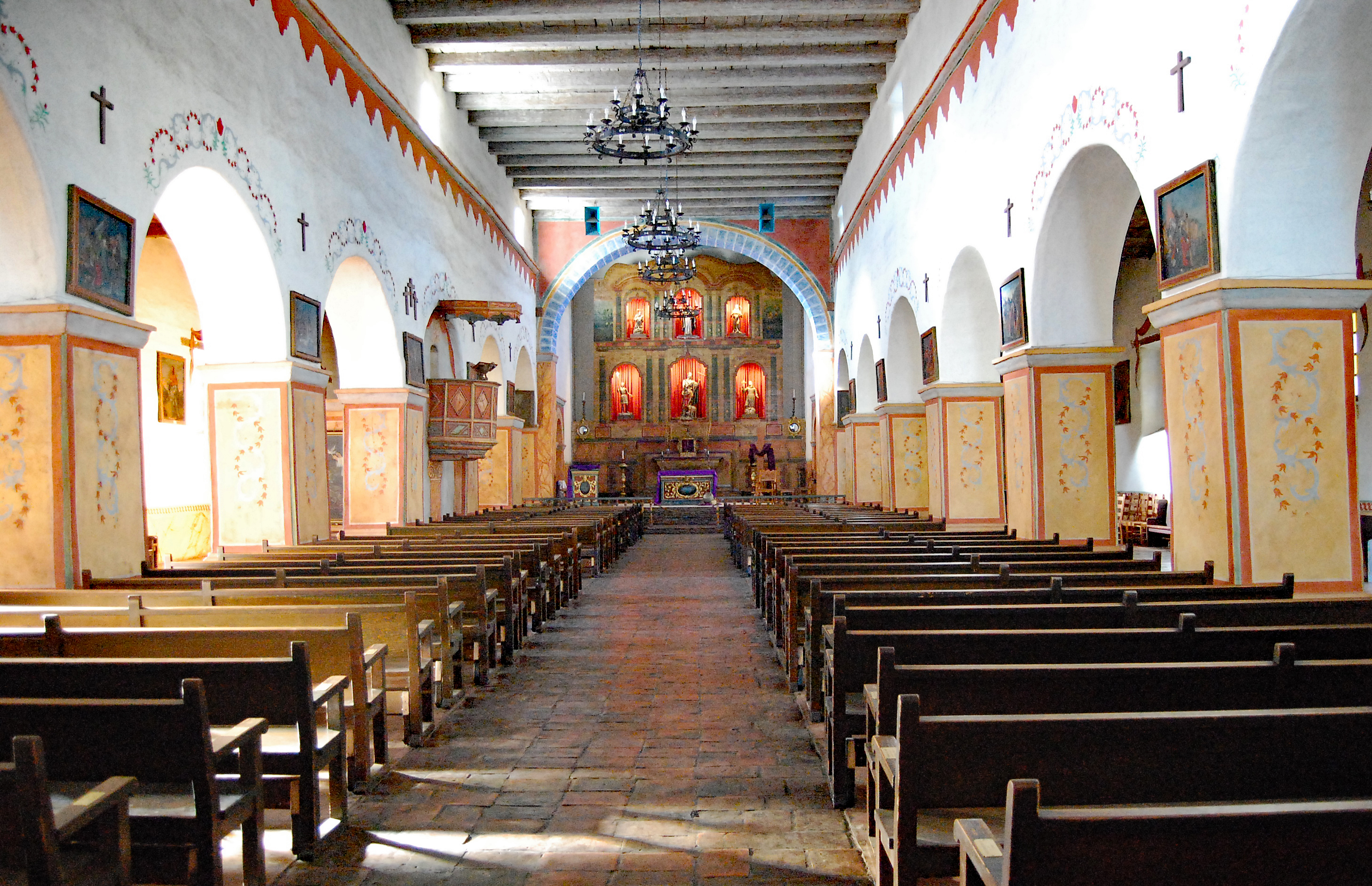
Interior of the Roman Catholic church of Mission San Juan Bautista

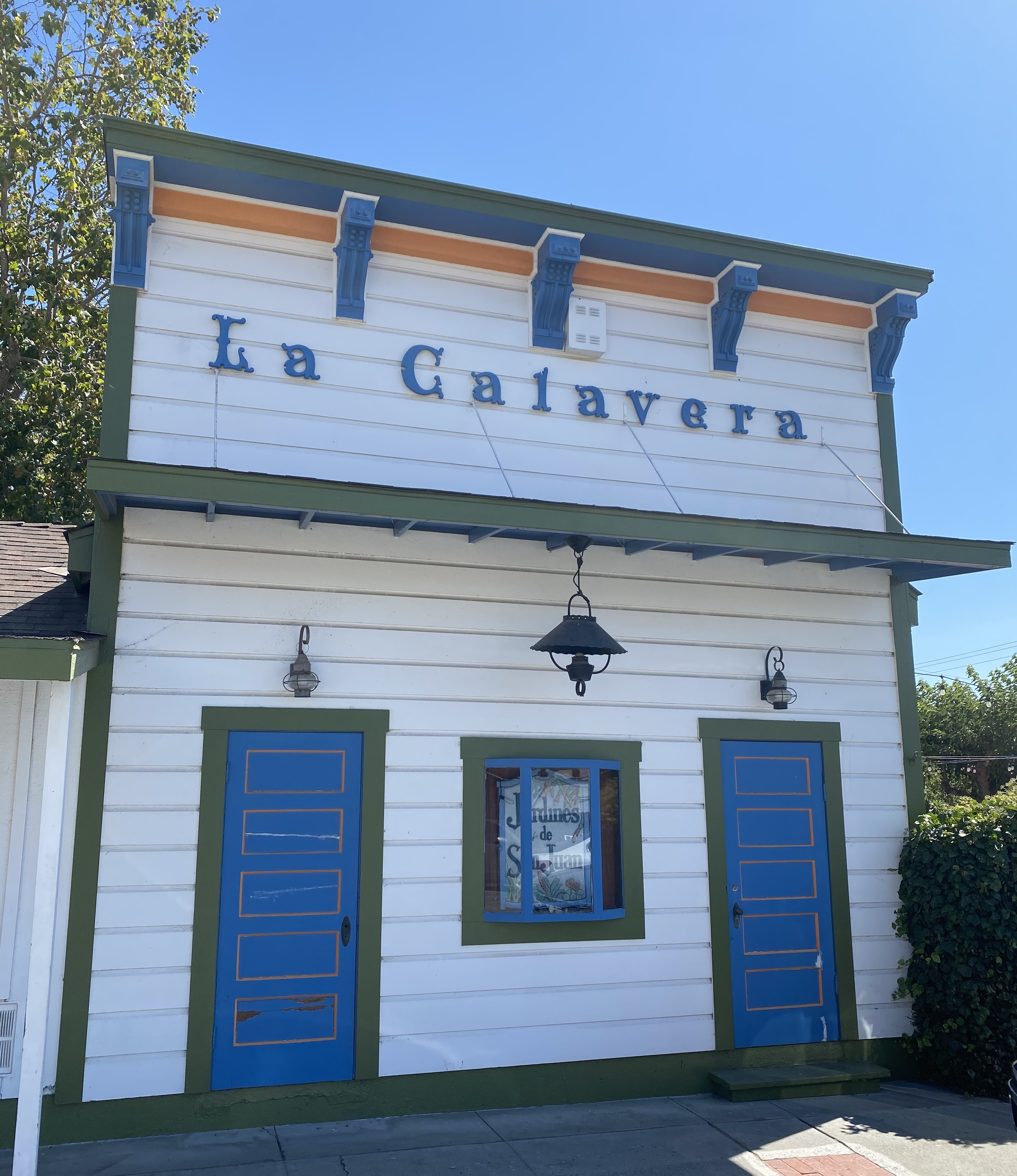
La Calavera Theatre

At the 2010 census San Juan Bautista had a population of 1,862. The population density was 2,616.4 inhabitants per square mile (1,010.2/km^{2}). The racial makeup of San Juan Bautista was 1,125 (60.4%) White, 12 (0.6%) African American, 58 (3.1%) Native American, 52 (2.8%) Asian, 2 (0.1%) Pacific Islander, 494 (26.5%) from other races, and 119 (6.4%) from two or more races. There were 907 Hispanic or Latino residents, of any race (48.7%).

The mission had 1,248 Mutsun Native Americans. The census reported that 1,857 people (99.7% of the population) lived in households, 5 (0.3%) lived in non-institutionalized group quarters, and no one was institutionalized.

There were 681 households, 229 (33.6%) had children under the age of 18 living in them, 345 (50.7%) were opposite-sex married couples living together, 86 (12.6%) had a female householder with no husband present, 48 (7.0%) had a male householder with no wife present. There were 42 (6.2%) unmarried opposite-sex partnerships, and 8 (1.2%) same-sex married couples or partnerships. 157 households (23.1%) were one person and 48 (7.0%) had someone living alone who was 65 or older. The average household size was 2.73. There were 479 families (70.3% of households); the average family size was 3.21.

The age distribution was 431 people (23.1%) under the age of 18, 178 people (9.6%) aged 18 to 24, 476 people (25.6%) aged 25 to 44, 556 people (29.9%) aged 45 to 64, and 221 people (11.9%) who were 65 or older. The median age was 38.7 years. For every 100 females, there were 92.4 males. For every 100 females aged 18 and over, there were 92.3 males.

There were 745 housing units at an average density of 1,046.9 per square mile, of the occupied units 345 (50.7%) were owner-occupied and 336 (49.3%) were rented. The homeowner vacancy rate was 3.6%; the rental vacancy rate was 5.1%. 898 people (48.2%) residing in the city. The population density was 2,187.0 inhabitants per square mile (844.4/km^{2}). There were 615 housing units at an average density of 0.0 per square mile (334.4/km^{2}). The racial makeup of the city in 2010 was 43.9% non-Hispanic White, 0.6% non-Hispanic African American, 1.6% Native American, 2.5% Asian, 0.1% Pacific Islander, 0.2% from other races, and 2.5% from two or more races. Hispanic or Latino of any race were 48.7% of the population.

== Economy ==
San Juan is largely an agricultural community, though the town has a strong tourist industry, owing to its historic and cultural sites.

Earthbound Farm, based in San Juan, is the largest producer of organic salads in the United States.

The Fremont Peak Observatory, located atop Fremont Peak in the Gabilán Range, is a non-profit astronomical institution serving the local community.

== Government ==
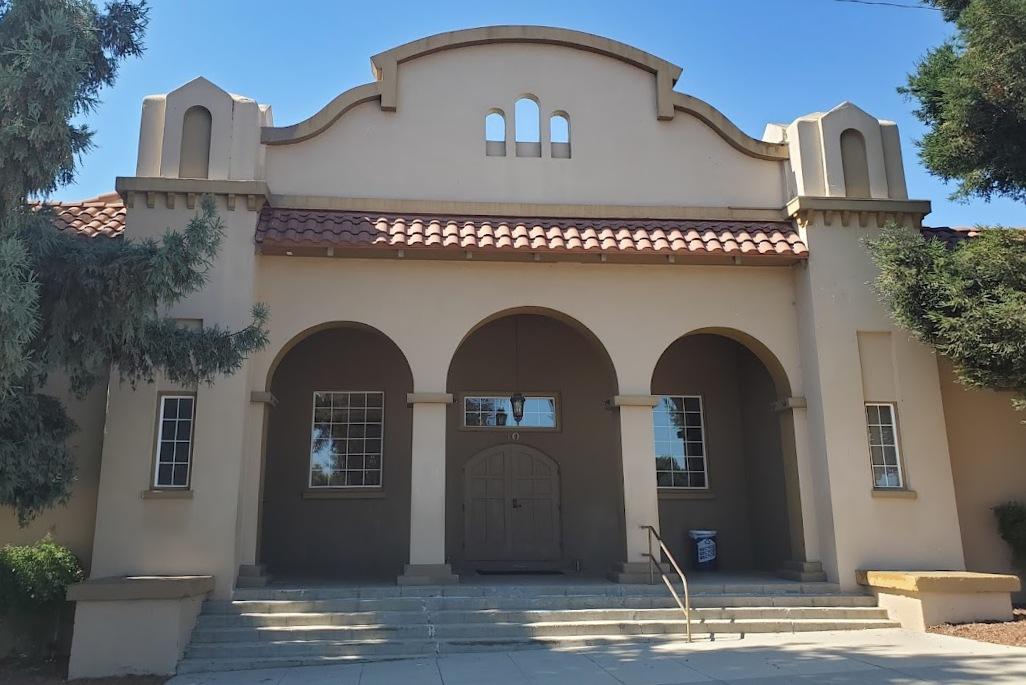
San Juan Community Hall, built in the 1920s in a Mission Revival style

In the California State Legislature, San Juan Bautista is in the 17th senatorial district, represented by Democrat John Laird, and in the 29th Assembly district, represented by Democrat Robert Rivas.

In the United States House of Representatives, San Juan Bautista is in California's 18th congressional district, represented by Democrat Zoe Lofgren.

== Media ==
CMAP TV – Community Media Access Partnership operates Channels 17, 18, 19 & 20 on Charter/Spectrum Cable as well as streaming online, offering public access and educational programming to Gilroy, California and San Benito County as well as covering live civic meetings, including the City of San Juan Bautista.

== Popular culture ==
The location was used for scenes in the Alfred Hitchcock film Vertigo, though the church tower, which had been demolished years earlier by fire, was added by special effects.

== Notable people ==
- Amalia Mesa-Bains, Chicana feminist author and artist
- Ed Walker, last surviving member of the Alaskan Scouts
- George H. Moore, member of Los Angeles City Council
- Jaime Cortez, artist and LGBT rights activist
- Luis Valdez, father of Chicano film and founder of El Teatro Campesino
- Robert J. Mazzuca, 11th CEO of the Boy Scouts of America
- Rowena Meeks Abdy, modernist painter
- Salomón Pico, a Californio "Robin Hood"
- Xochiquetzal Candelaria, poet

== Historical Landmarks ==
- San Juan Bautista State Historic Park
- Mission San Juan Bautista 1797
- Plaza Hotel 1813
- José Castro House 1838
- Juan de Anza House 1830
- Marentis House 1873
- Rozas House 1856
- Benjamin Wilcox House 1858
- San Juan Jail 1870
- Juan Bautista de Anza National Historic Trail

== See also ==
- California Historical Landmarks in San Benito County
- National Register of Historic Places listings in San Benito County, California
