= California Historical Landmarks in San Benito County =

List table of the properties and districts — listed on the California Historical Landmarks — within San Benito County, Northern California.

- Note: Click the "Map of all coordinates" link to the right to view a Google map of all properties and districts with latitude and longitude coordinates in the table below.

== Listings ==
Image		Landmark name	Location	City or town	Summary
Fremont Peak	181	Fremont Peak	Fremont Peak State Park; 36°45′26″N 121°30′15″W	San Juan Bautista	
Jose Castro House	179	Jose Castro House	San Juan Bautista State Historic Park; 36°50′41″N 121°32′09″W	San Juan Bautista	
Mission San Juan Bautista	195	Mission San Juan Bautista	2nd and Mariposa Sts. 36°50′42″N 121°32′09″W	San Juan Bautista	
New Idria Mine	324	New Idria Mine	36°25′01″N 120°40′24″W	New Idria	
Plaza Hotel	180	Plaza Hotel	San Juan Bautista State Historic Park; 36°50′42″N 121°32′10″W	San Juan Bautista	

== See also ==
- List of California Historical Landmarks
- National Register of Historic Places listings in San Benito County, California
