= José Castro House =

Historic house in California, United States

- U.S. National Register of Historic Places
- U.S. National Historic Landmark
- U.S. National Historic Landmark District – Contributing property
- California Historical Landmark
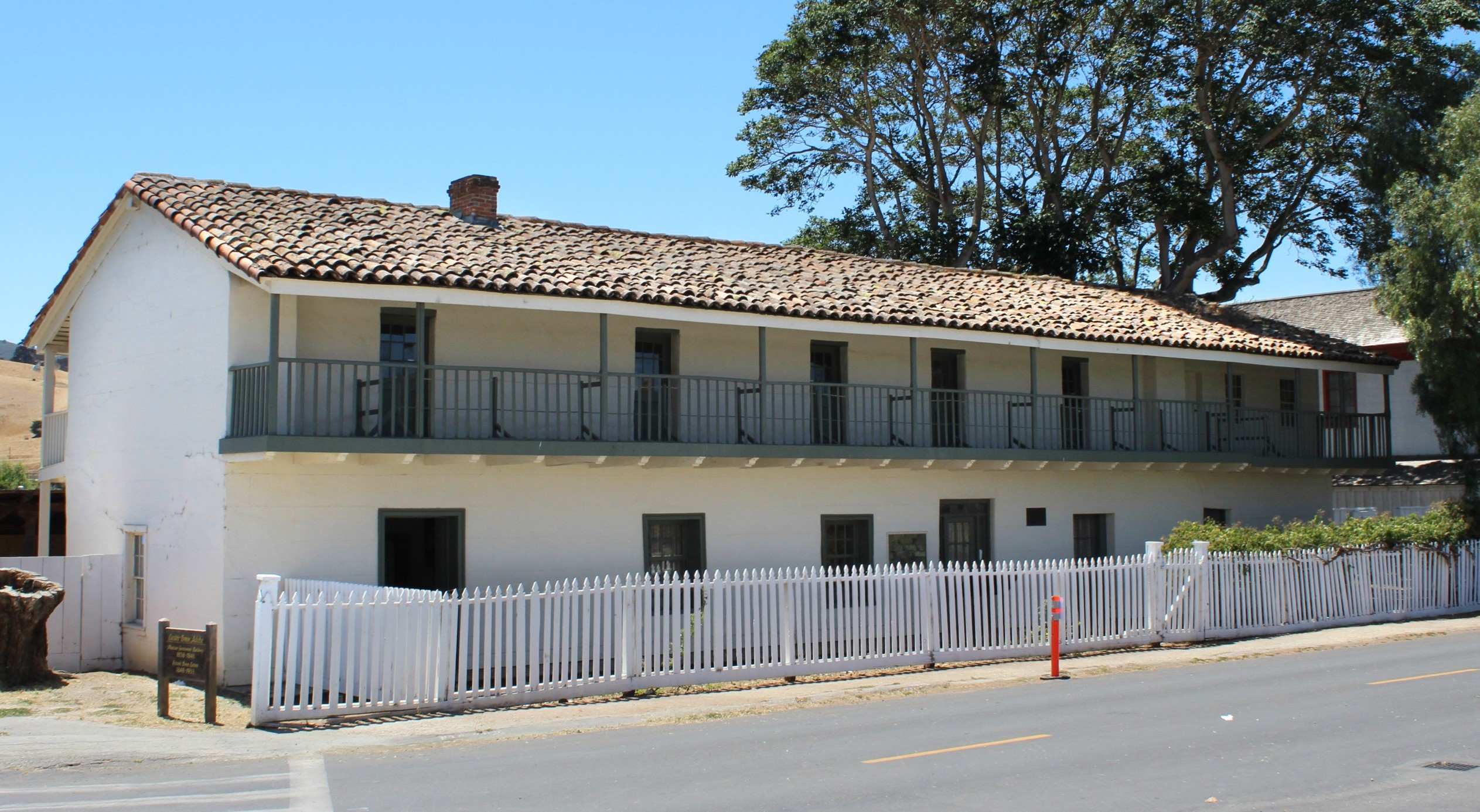
- The Plaza de San Juan façade of the house

- Location within California Location within the United States
- Location: S side of the Plaza, San Juan Bautista, California
- Coordinates: 36°50′40.78″N 121°32′4.86″W
- Area: 1 acre (0.40 ha)
- Built: 1838
- Architect: José Antonio Castro
- Architectural style: Monterey Colonial
- Part of: San Juan Bautista Plaza Historic District (ID69000038)
- NRHP reference No.: 70000141
- CHISL No.: 179

Significant dates
- Added to NRHP: April 15, 1970
- Designated NHL: May 15, 1970
- Designated NHLDCP: April 15, 1970
- Designated CHISL: March 6, 1935

The José Castro House (Spanish: Casa José Castro), sometimes known as the Castro-Breen Adobe, is a historic adobe home in San Juan Bautista, California, facing the Plaza de San Juan. The Monterey Colonial style house was built 1838-41 by General José Antonio Castro, a former Governor of Alta California. It was later sold to the Breen family, who lived there until 1933, when the house became a museum as part of San Juan Bautista State Historic Park.

== History ==
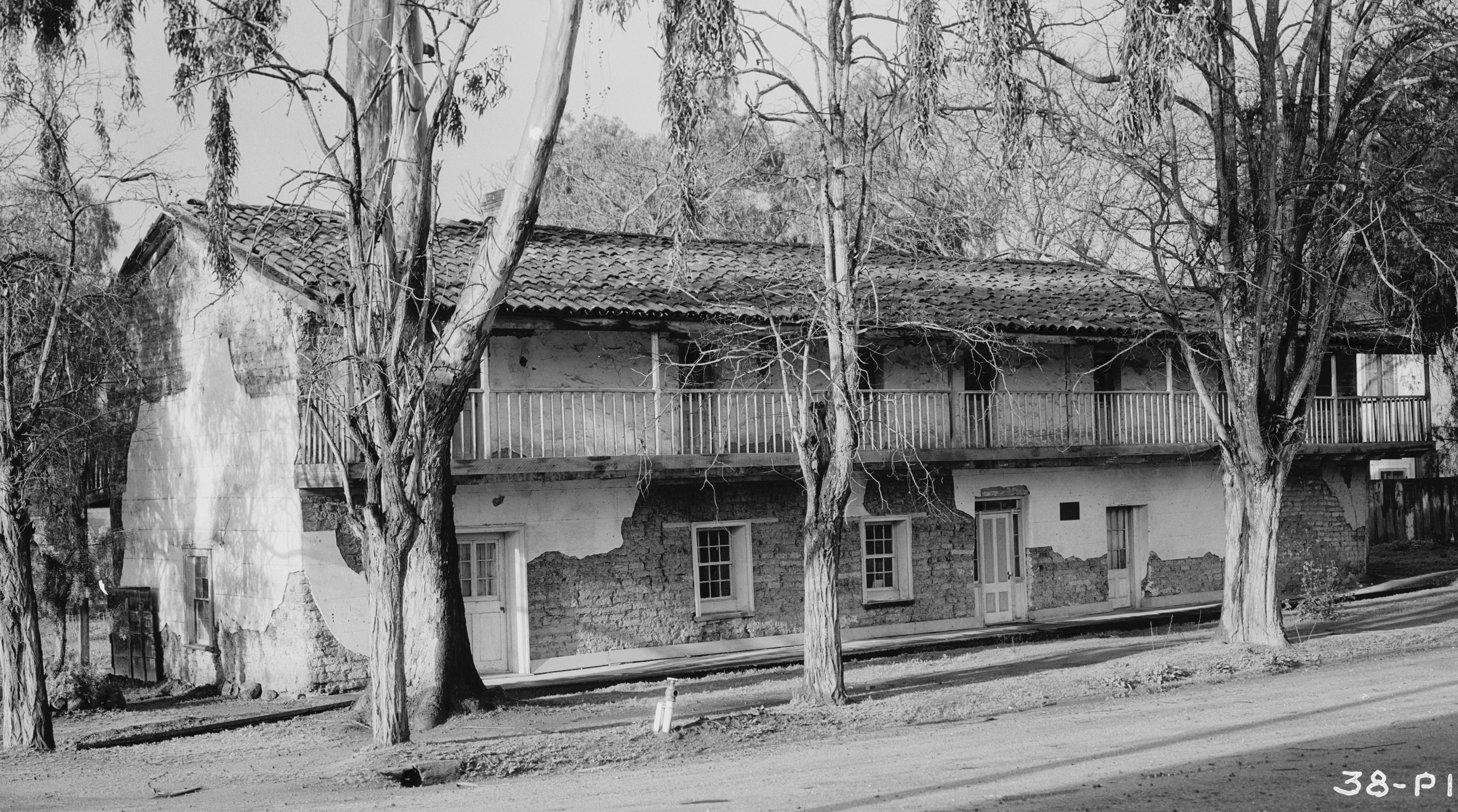
José Castro House in 1934.

José Antonio Castro's father José Tiburcio Castro was a soldier, member of the Diputación (the legislature of Alta California), administrator of Mission San Juan Bautista after it was secularized, and grantee of Rancho Sausal.

The elder Castro used his position to obtain land grants for relatives and friends. His son was granted land facing the Plaza de San Juan, where he built an adobe house in 1841. José Antonio Castro used the house as an administrative base for his military operations (soldiers' barracks were next door) and let his secretary use it as a residence.

In 1848, José Antonio Castro sold the home to Patrick Breen, a survivor of the Donner Party. His family occupied the home until 1933, when it was declared a California Historical Landmark and purchased by California State Parks, which incorporated it into the San Juan Bautista State Historic Park.

Currently, the park uses the José Castro House as a fully furnished house museum, displaying a snapshot of how domestic life was in mid-19th century California. The house was made a National Historic Landmark in 1970.

== Architecture ==
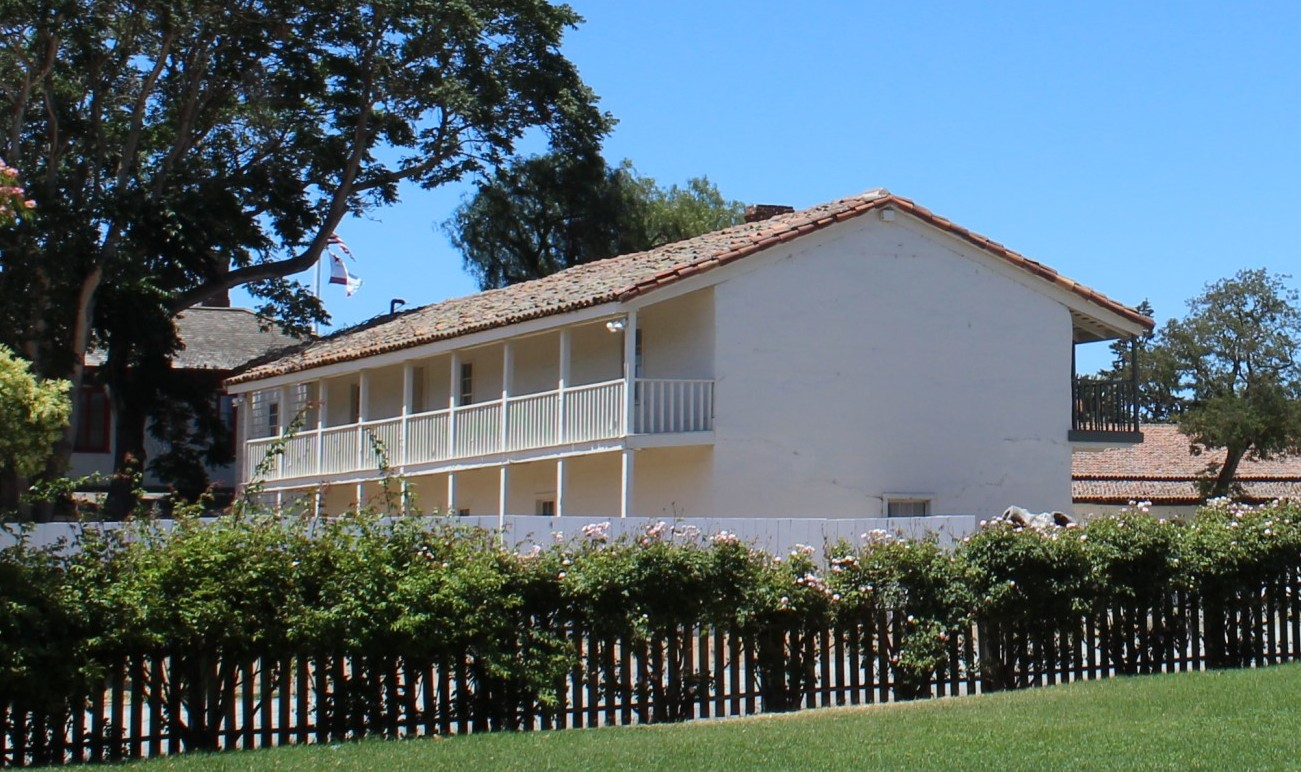
The garden façade of the house.

José Castro House is a two-story adobe home, completed in a Monterey Colonial style. The home is clad in stucco and includes a second-story full-length covered porches on both long sides, characteristic of Monterey Colonial architecture.

The pane glass windows beside the front door of the José Castro House are not typical of Monterey architecture and reflect the influence of Greek Revival architecture, which was also popular in the mid-19th century.

Nowadays, the José Castro House property includes a half-acre orchard and garden, open to the public as part of the state historic park.

== See also ==
- Plaza Hotel
- California Historical Landmarks in San Benito County
