= Mission San Juan Bautista =

18th-century Spanish mission in California

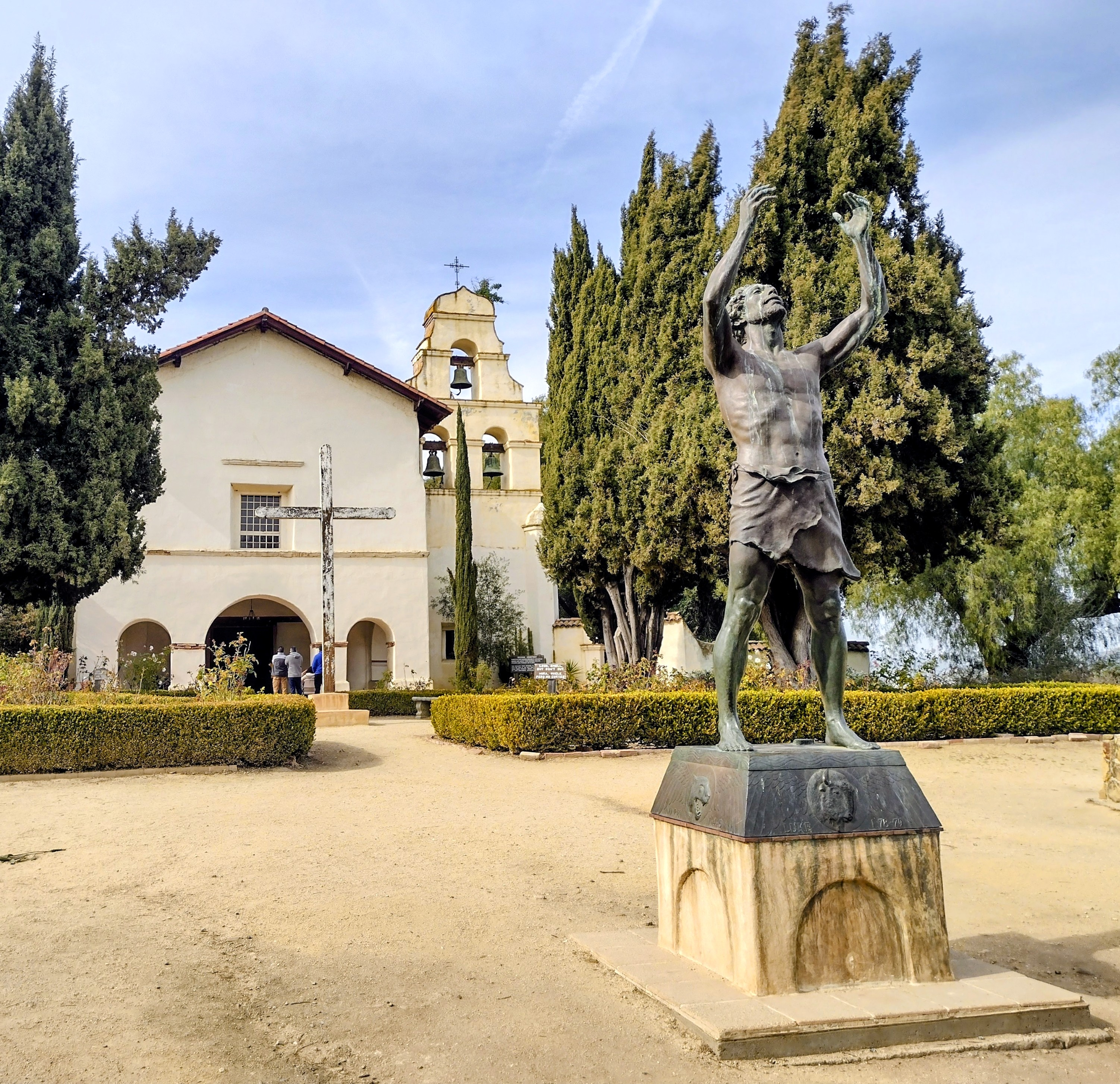
- A view of the Mission San Juan Bautista and its three-bell campanario ("bell wall") and statue of Saint John the Baptist. Two of the bells were salvaged by Father Nick Senf in 2009 from the original chime, which was destroyed in the 1906 San Francisco earthquake.

- Location within California
- Location: 406 2nd Street; San Juan Bautista, California 95045
- Coordinates: 36.845083°N 121.535889°W
- Name as founded: La Misión del Glorios Precursor de Jesu Cristo, Nuestro Señor San Juan Bautista
- English translation: The Mission of the Glorious Precursor of Jesus Christ, Our Lord, Saint John the Baptist
- Patron: Saint John the Baptist
- Nickname: "Mission of Music"
- Founded: June 24, 1797
- Founded by: Father Fermín Lasuén
- Founding Order: Fifteenth
- Military district: Third
- Native tribe(s) Spanish name(s): Mutsun, Yokuts; Costeño
- Native place name: Popeloutchom
- Baptisms: 4,106
- Marriages: 1,003
- Burials: 2,854
- Secularized: 1835
- Returned to the Church: 1859
- Governing body: Diocese of Monterey
- Current use: Parish Church

California Historical Landmark
- Reference no.: 1. 195

Website
- http://www.oldmissionsjb.org/

Mission San Juan Bautista is a Spanish mission in San Juan Bautista, San Benito County, California. Founded on June 24, 1797, by Fermín de Lasuén of the Franciscan order, the mission was the fifteenth of the Spanish missions established in present-day California. Named for Saint John the Baptist, the mission is the namesake of the city of San Juan Bautista.

Barracks for the soldiers, a nunnery, the Jose Castro House, the Plaza Hotel and other buildings were constructed around a large grassy plaza in front of the church and can be seen today in their original form. The Ohlone, the original residents of the valley, were brought to live at the mission and baptized, followed by Yokuts from the Central Valley. Many of the natives were abused, used as slaves, and prevented form leaving by the padres. Mission San Juan Bautista has served mass daily since 1797, and today functions as a parish church of the Diocese of Monterey.

== History ==
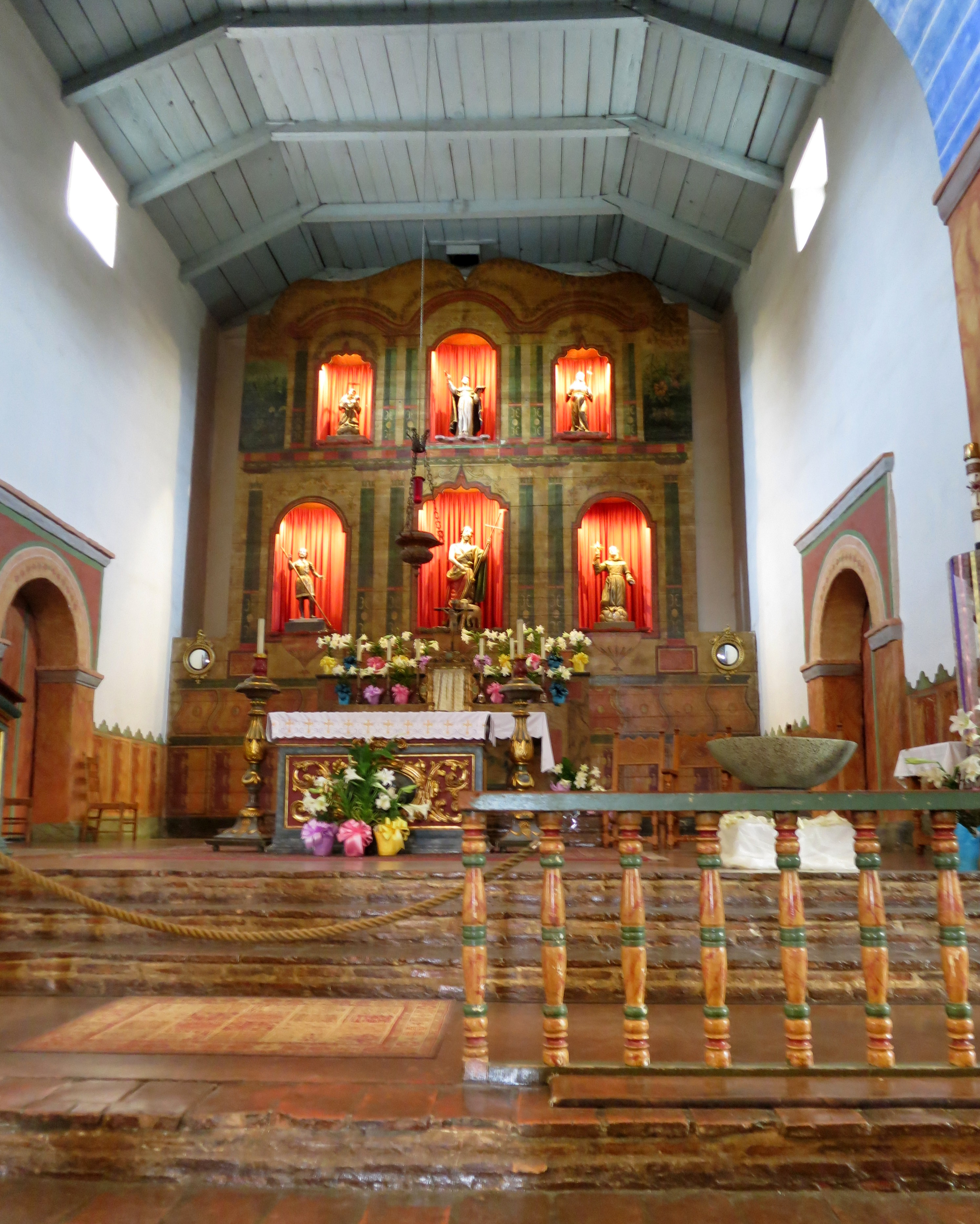
The church chancel with Easter decoration

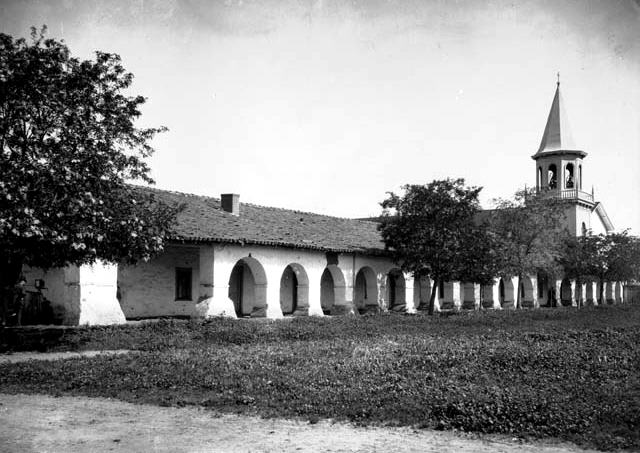
A photograph of Mission San Juan Bautista taken between 1880 and 1910. The steeple (far right), constructed after the mission was secularized, was subsequently destroyed in a fire.

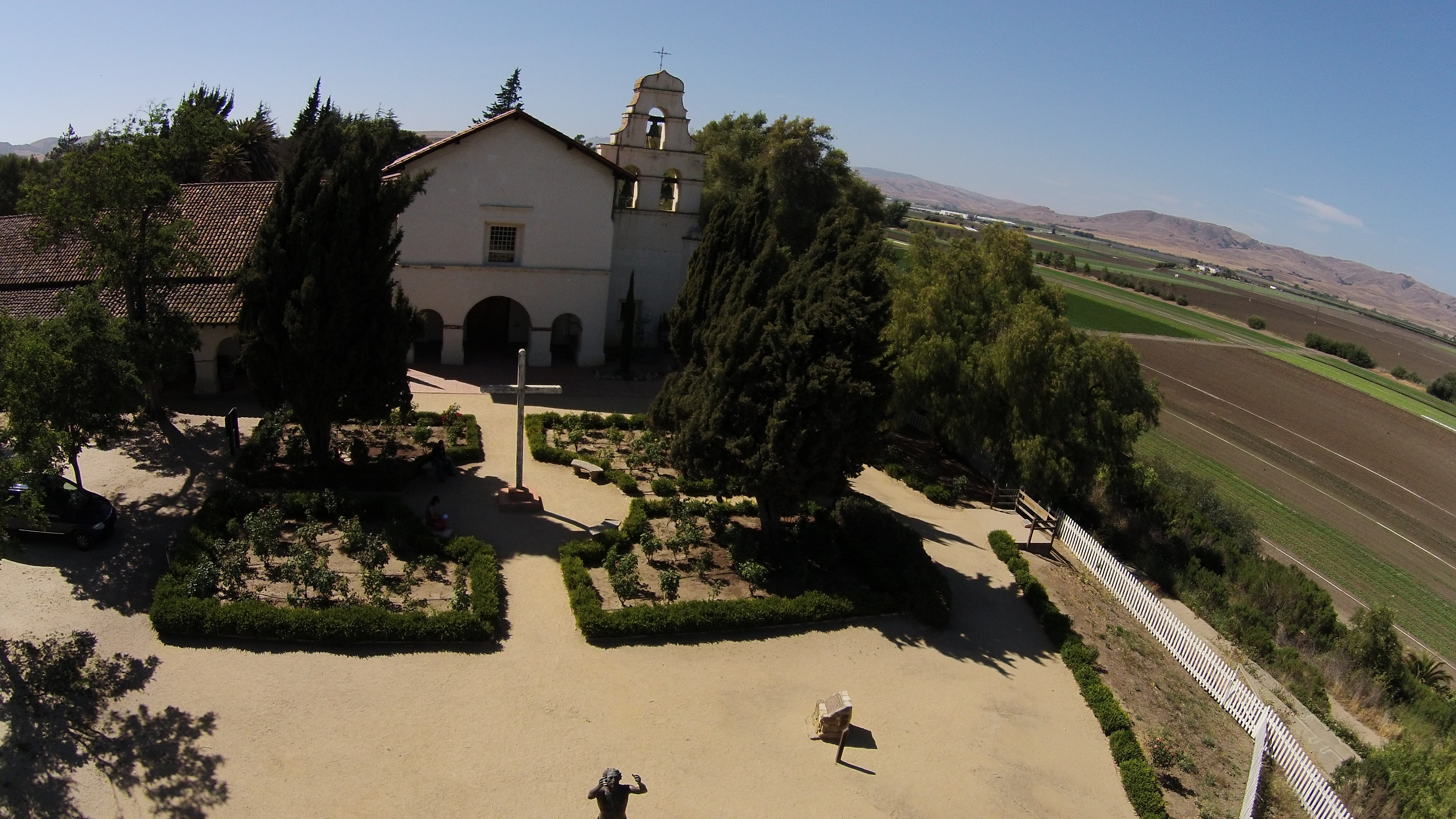
Aerial view of Mission San Juan Bautista

Following its creation in 1797, San Juan's population grew quickly. By 1803, there were 1,036 Native Americans living at the mission, many living in conditions of slaves. Ranching and farming activity had moved apace, with 1,036 cattle, 4,600 sheep, 22 swine, 540 horses and 8 mules counted that year. At the same time, the harvest of wheat, barley and corn was estimated at 2,018 fanegas, each of about 220 pounds.

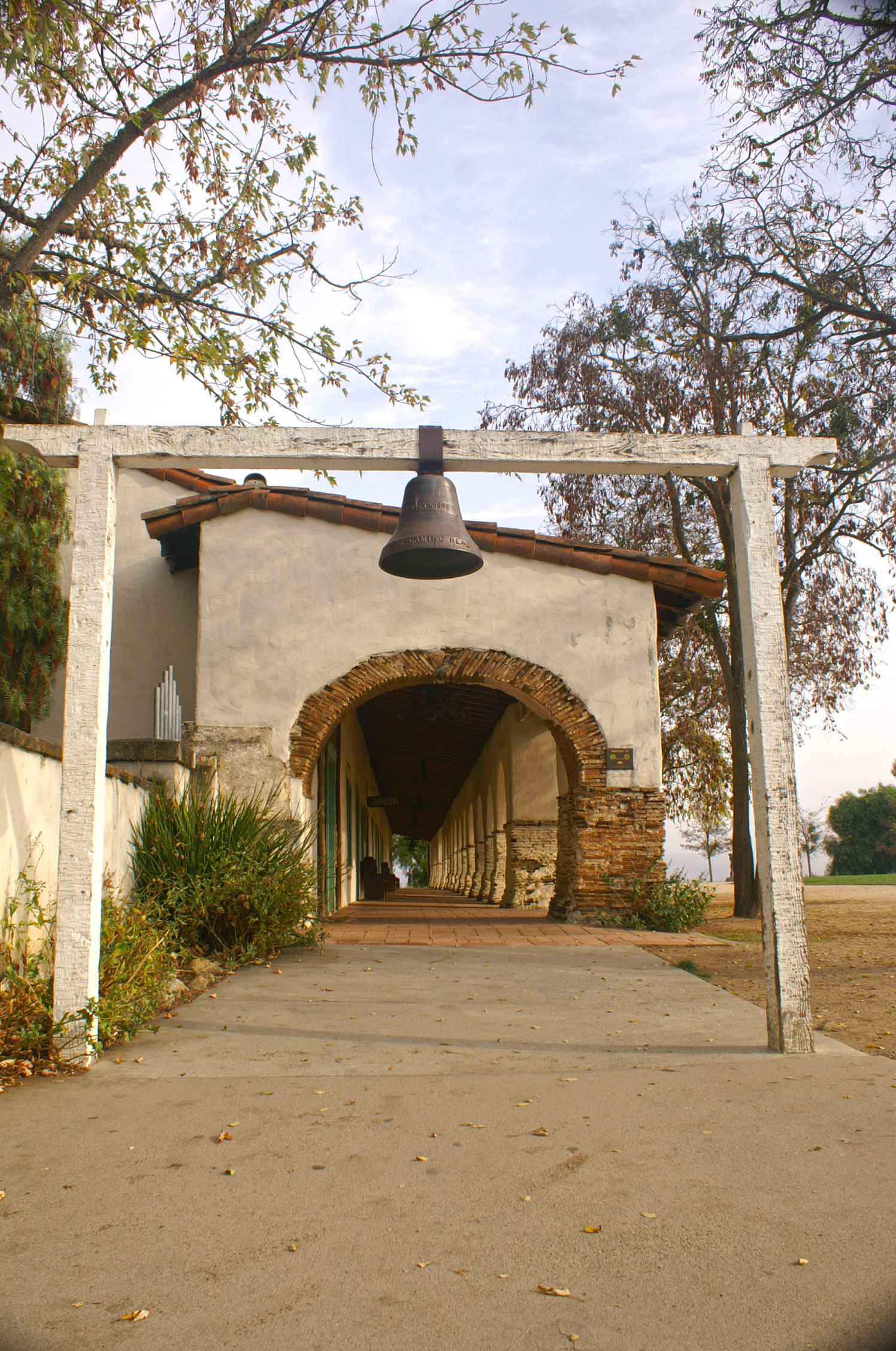
Entrance Bell

Father Pedro Estévan Tápis (who had a special talent for music) joined Father Felipe Arroyo de la Cuesta, at Mission San Juan Bautista in 1815 to teach singing to the Native Americans. He employed a system of notation developed in Spain that uses varied colors or textures for polyphonic music, usually (from bottom to top) solid black, solid red, black outline (sometimes solid yellow) and red outline (or black outline when yellow was used). His choir of Native American boys performed for many visitors, earning the San Juan Bautista Mission the nickname "the Mission of Music." Two of his handwritten choir books are preserved at the San Juan Bautista Museum. When Father Tapis died in 1825 he was buried on the mission grounds. The town of San Juan Bautista, which grew up around the mission, expanded rapidly during the California Gold Rush and continues to be a thriving community today.

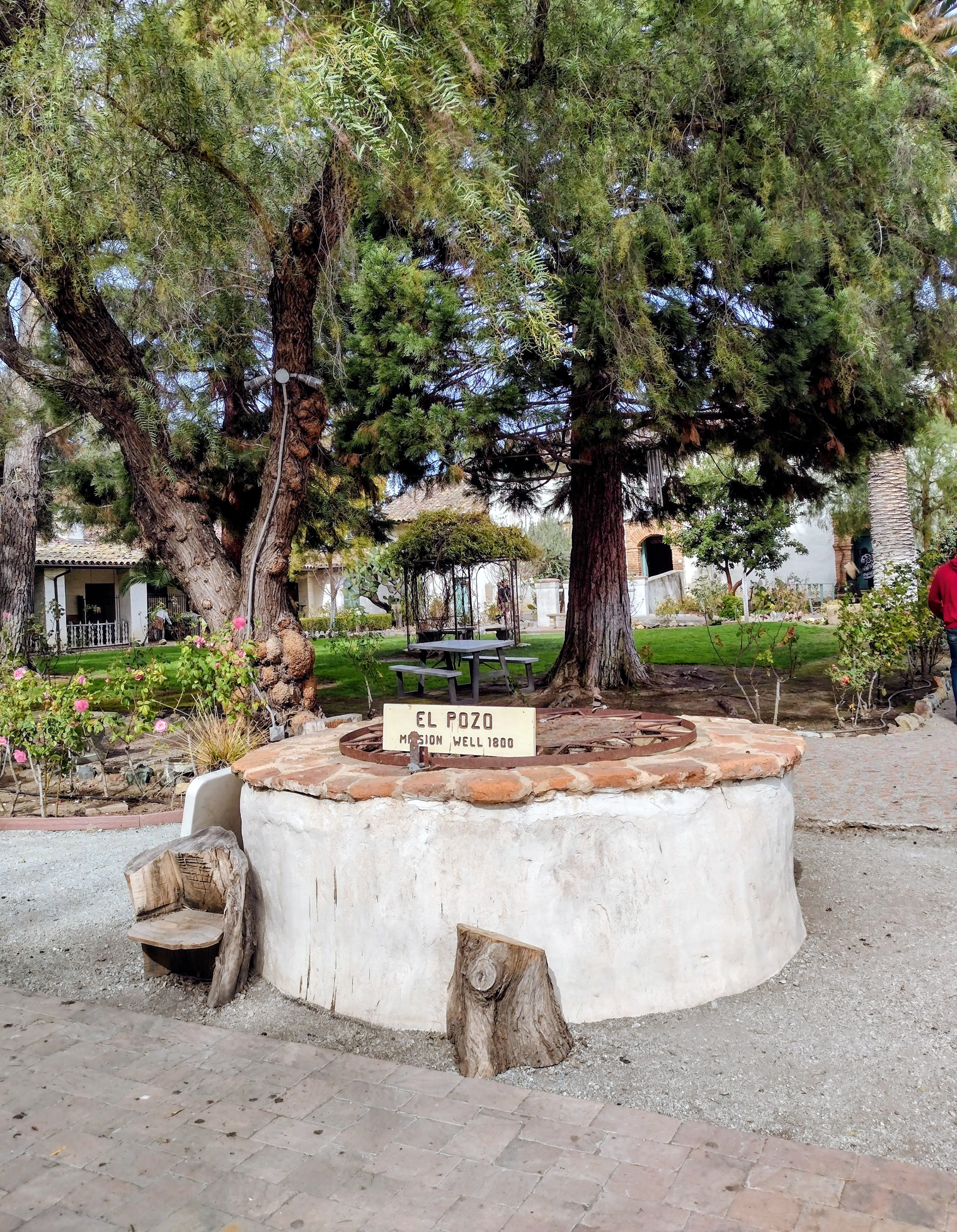
Water well in mission grounds

The mission is situated adjacent to the San Andreas Fault, and has suffered damage from numerous earthquakes, such as those of 1800 and 1906. However, the mission was never entirely destroyed at once. It was restored initially in 1884, and then again in 1949 with funding from the Hearst Foundation. The three-bell campanario, or "bell wall," located by the church entrance, was fully restored in 2010. An unpaved stretch of the original El Camino Real, just east of the mission, lies on a fault scarp.

Although initially secularized in 1835, the church was reconsecrated by the Catholic Church in 1859, and continues to serve as a parish of the Diocese of Monterey. The mission includes a cemetery, with the remains of over 4,000 Native American converts and Europeans buried there.

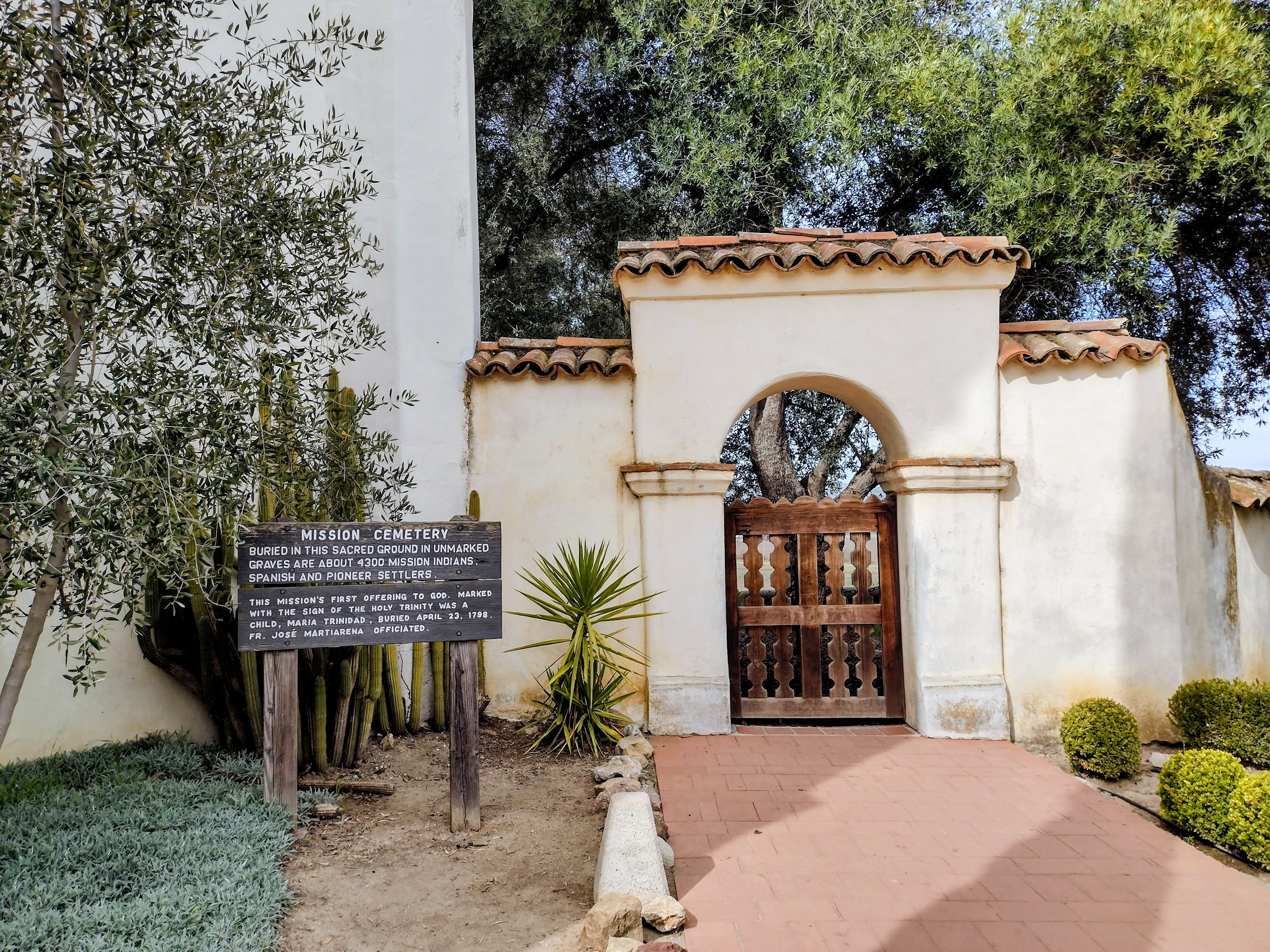
Cemetery gate

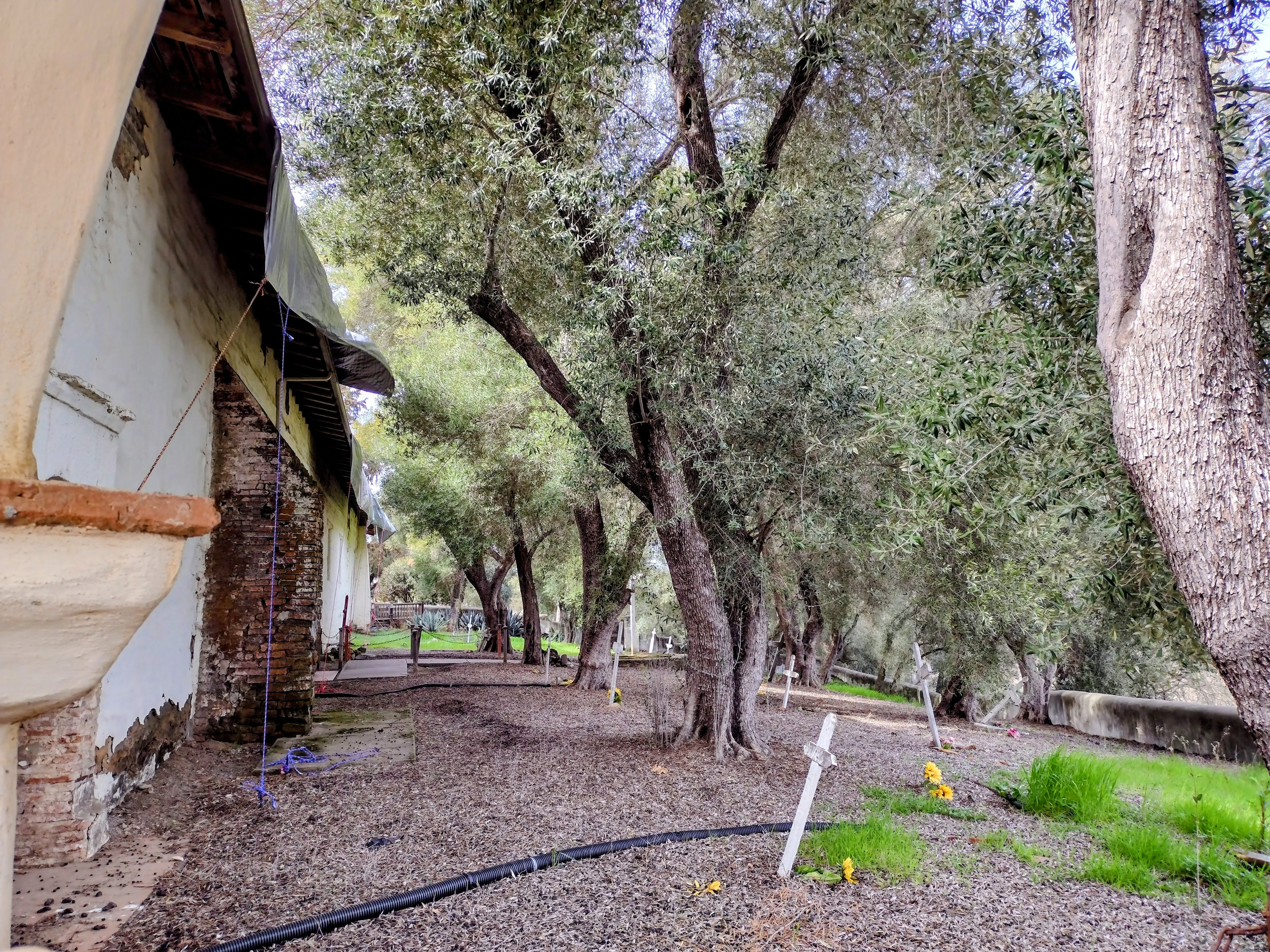
Cemetery grounds

The mission and its grounds were featured prominently in the 1958 Alfred Hitchcock film Vertigo. Associate producer Herbert Coleman's daughter Judy Lanini suggested the mission to Hitchcock as a filming location. A steeple, added sometime after the mission's original construction and secularization, had been demolished following a fire, so Hitchcock added a bell tower using scale models, matte paintings, and trick photography at the Paramount studio in Los Angeles. The tower does not resemble the original steeple. The tower's staircase was assembled inside a studio.

== Gallery ==
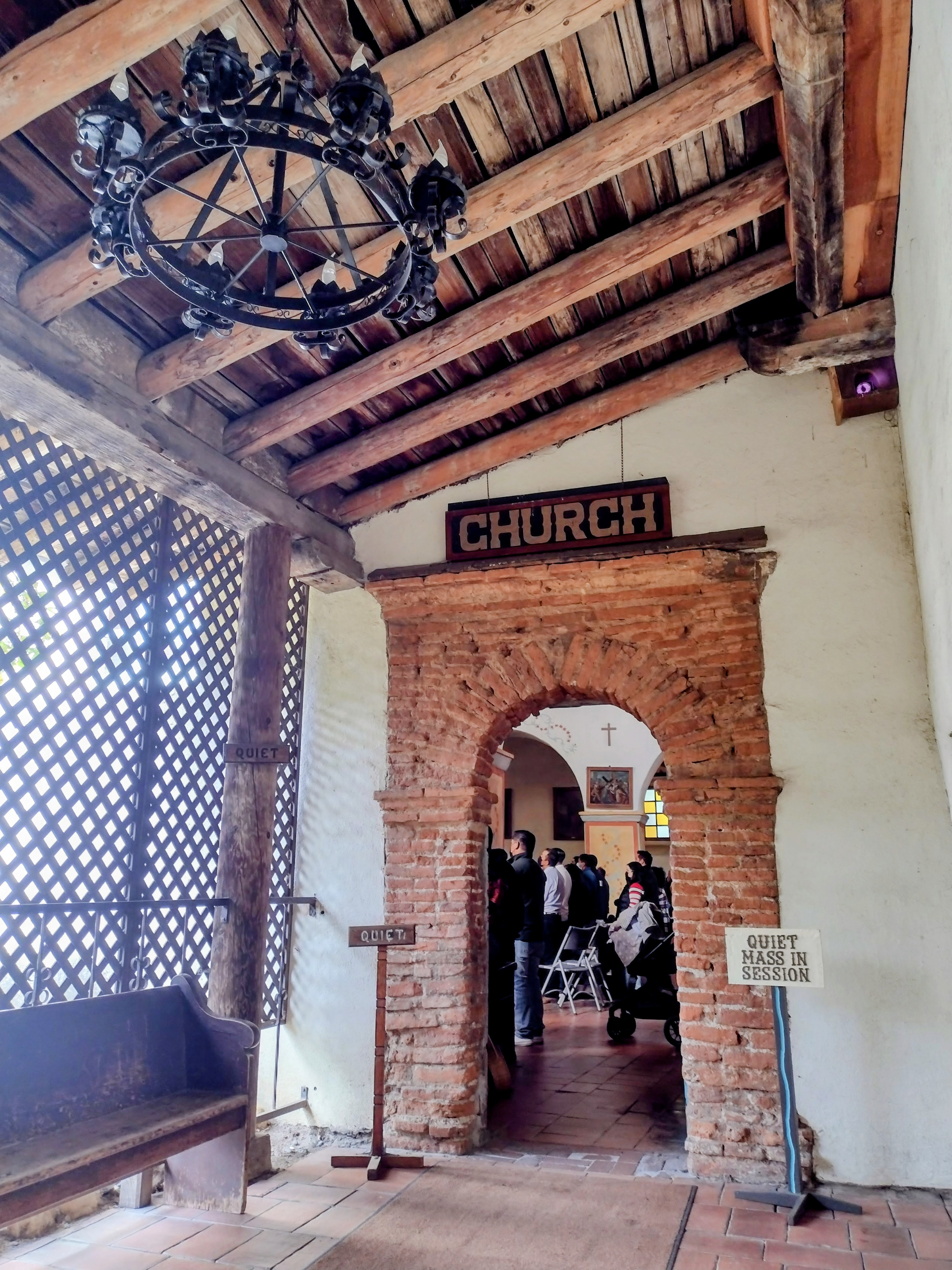
Entrance to church

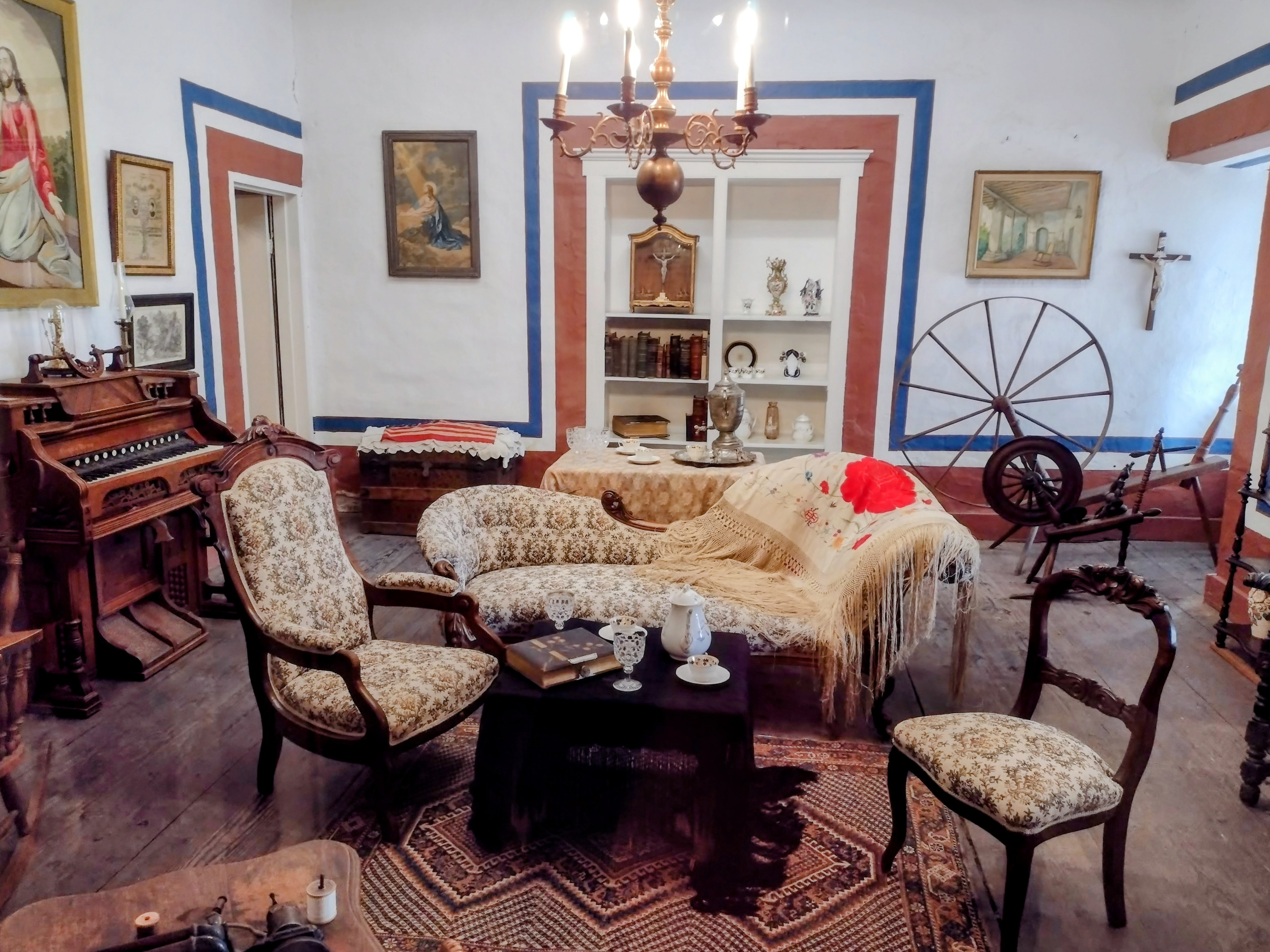
Lounge

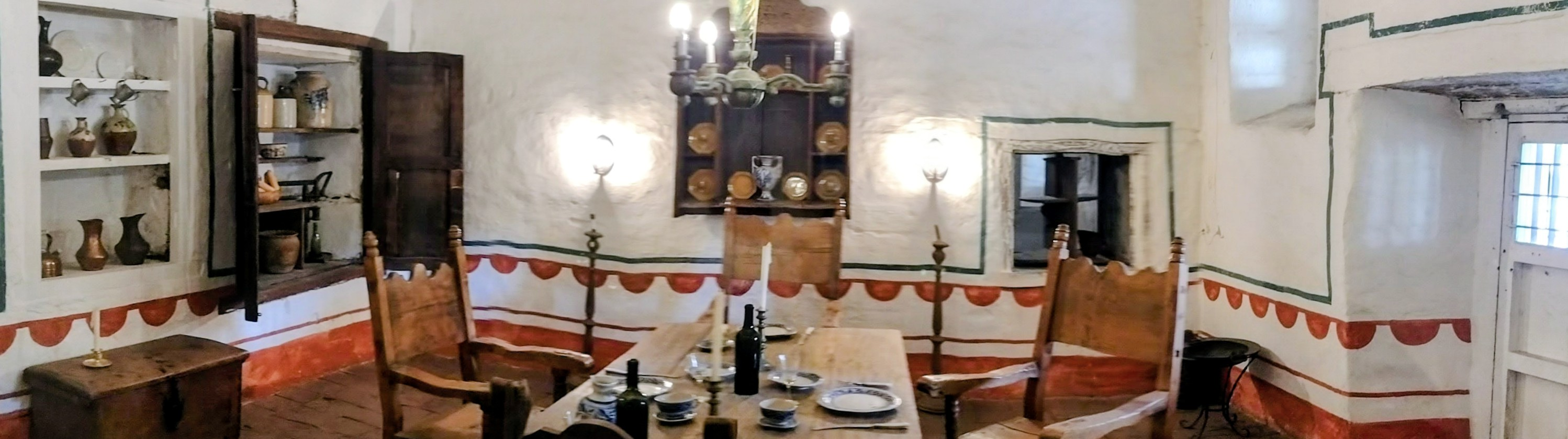
Dining hall

== See also ==
- Spanish missions in California
- List of Spanish missions in California
- Rancho San Justo
- Teatro Campesino
- USNS Mission San Juan (AO-126) – a Buenaventura Class fleet oiler built during World War II.

== Sources ==
- Bennett, John E. (February 1897b). "Should the California Missions Be Preserved? – Part II". Overland Monthly. XXIX (170): 150–161.
- Forbes, Alexander (1839). California: A History of Upper and Lower California. Cornhill, London: Smith, Elder and Co.
- Jones, Terry L.; Kathryn A. Klar, eds. (2007). California Prehistory: Colonization, Culture, and Complexity. Landham, MD: Altimira Press. ISBN 978-0759108721.
- Krell, Dorothy, ed. (1979). The California Missions: A Pictorial History. Menlo Park, CA: Sunset Publishing Corporation. ISBN 0376051728.
- Leffingwell, Randy (2005). California Missions and Presidios: The History & Beauty of the Spanish Missions. Stillwater, MN: Voyageur Press, Inc. ISBN 0896584925.
- Levy, Richard. (1978). William C. Sturtevant, and Robert F. Heizer (ed.). Handbook of North American Indians. Vol. 8 (California). Washington, DC: Smithsonian Institution. p. 486. ISBN 0160045789.
- Milliken, Randall (1995). A Time of Little Choice: The Disintegration of Tribal Culture in the San Francisco Bay Area 1769–1910. Menlo Park, CA: Ballena Press Publication. ISBN 0879191325.
- Paddison, Joshua, ed. (1999). A World Transformed: Firsthand Accounts of California Before the Gold Rush. Berkeley, CA: Heyday Books. ISBN 1890771139.
- Ruscin, Terry (1999). Mission Memoirs. San Diego, CA: Sunbelt Publications. ISBN 0932653308.
- Yenne, Bill (2004). The Missions of California. San Diego, CA: Thunder Bay Press. ISBN 1592233198.
