= Plaza Hotel (San Juan Bautista, California) =

Historical Landmark in San Juan Bautista, California, United States

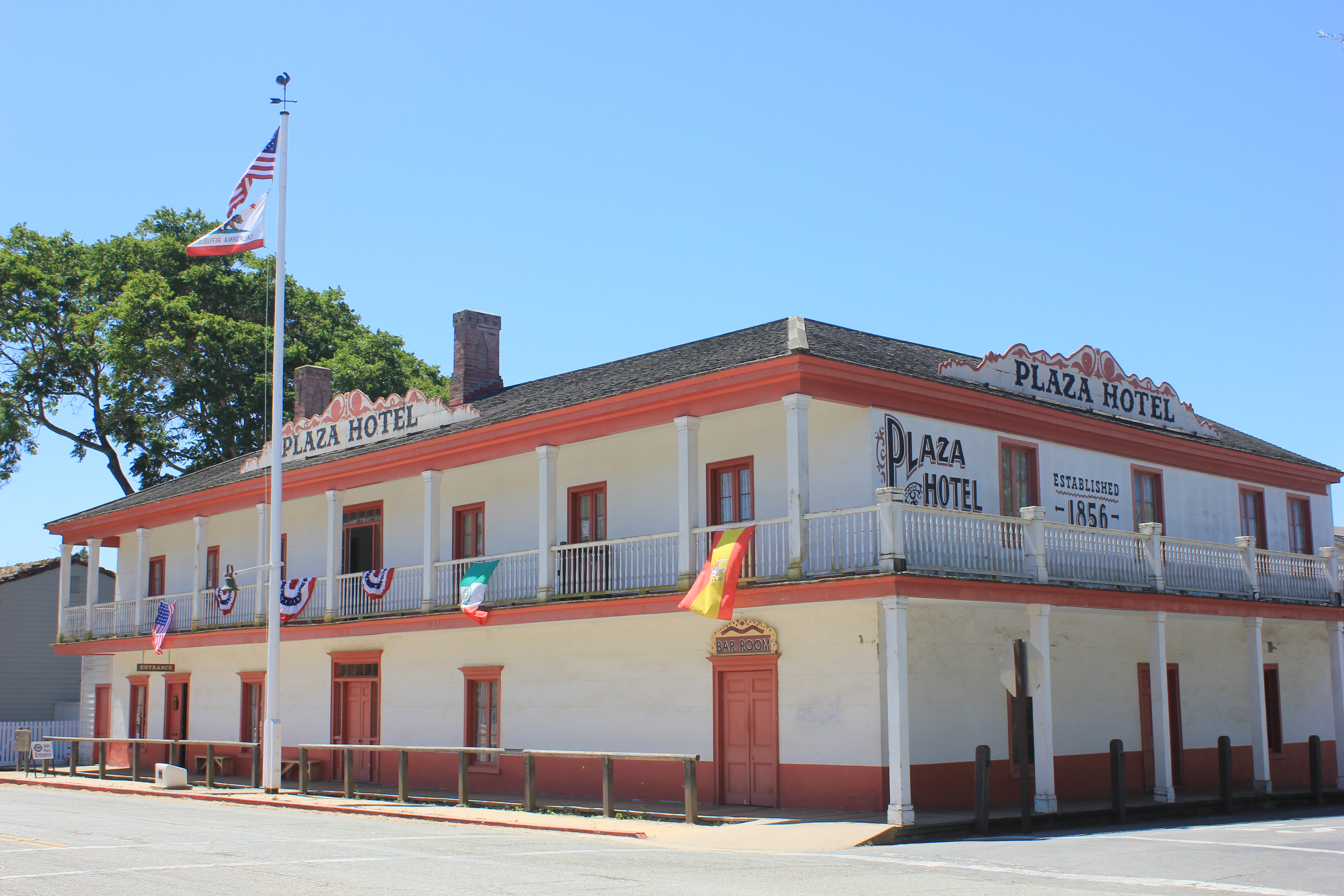
- Plaza Hotel in San Juan Bautista, California

- Location within California Location within the United States
- 36.84492°N 121.53613°W
- Location: S side of the Plaza, San Juan Bautista, California

History
- Built: 1813

Site notes
- Architect: Franciscans - Monterey Colonial
- Architectural style: Adobe

California Historical Landmark
- Designated: March 6, 1935
- Reference no.: 180

Plaza Hotel in San Juan Bautista, California in San Benito County, is a California Historical Landmark No. 654 listed on March 6, 1935. The Plaza Hotel was built in 1813 as an adobe soldiers barracks by New Spain. The Spanish soldiers were stationed at the barracks to guard the Mission San Juan Bautista founded on June 24, 1797, by Fermín Lasuén. across the street. The Plaza Hotel building was built as a one-story building and later in the 1850s a second floor was added.

== History ==
Mission San Juan Bautista, called San Juan by locals of the mission days, was the fifteenth Spanish missions in California. Mexico won its independence from Spain in 1821 and passed the Mexican secularization act of 1833. The Mexican secularization act took most of the mission's lands and buildings way and gave them to connected people. As such the Plaza Hotel building was given to the Anzar family, which used it has a general store and their private residence. Angelo Zanetta, an Italian immigrant rented the building and he added the wooden second floor in the 1850s. With the second floor Zanetta opened the Plaza Hotel and restaurant in January 1859. San Juan Bautista is 93 miles south San Francisco and 33 miles north of Monterey. Thus San Juan Bautista was a popular stopping stop on the El Camino Real road to Monterey. Monterey was the Capitol of California from 1776 to 1849.

In 1861, stagecoach service came to San Juan, and the Plaza Stables were built to house and care for the many stagecoach horses. The Plaza Hotel became popular and well known in this time. At its peak, seven stage lines routes passed and stopped in San Juan, with 11 stagecoaches departing daily. There were stagecoach lines that were heading to San Francisco, Los Angeles, Monterey, Watsonville and Santa Cruz and Salinas. The Plaza Stables' blacksmith shop was also kept busy. The stagecoach service from Juan Bautista and Salinas traveled on what is now the Juan Bautista de Anza National Historic Trail. The Overland Stage Company had an office on the ground floor of the Plaza Hotel. Plaza Hotel also supported travelers to the New Idria Mercury Mine southeast of the town, opened in 1854 and closed in 1972.

The Plaza Hotel is at the only remaining Spanish plaza in California. The other mission plaza sites were built up into towns, or in the case of Mission San Antonio de Padua no town or plaza was built.

== See also ==
- California Historical Landmarks in San Benito County
- National Register of Historic Places listings in San Benito County, California
- Rancho San Justo
