= Benjamin Wilcox House =

- U.S. National Register of Historic Places
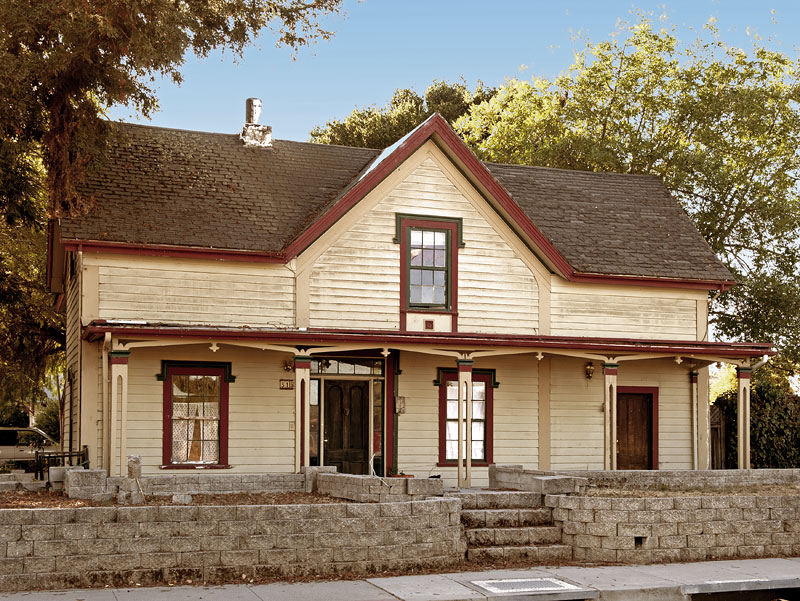

- Location within California
- Location: 315 The Alameda, San Juan Bautista, California
- Coordinates: 36.840388°N 121.533625°W
- Area: less than one acre
- Built: 1858
- Built by: George Chalmers
- Architect: George Chalmers
- Architectural style: Gothic Revival
- NRHP reference No.: 82002244
- Added to NRHP: February 19, 1982

The Benjamin Wilcox House, at 315 The Alameda in San Juan Bautista, California, was built in 1858. It was listed on the National Register of Historic Places in 1982.

It was designed by local builder George Chalmers in Gothic Revival style. It is a clapboarded balloon-frame L-shaped house built with redwood floor joists and sawn redwood studs. It has split pillars with Tuscan-order capitals, somehow involving fleur-de-lis.

== See also ==
- California Historical Landmarks in San Benito County
- Marentis House
