= Marentis House =

- U.S. National Register of Historic Places
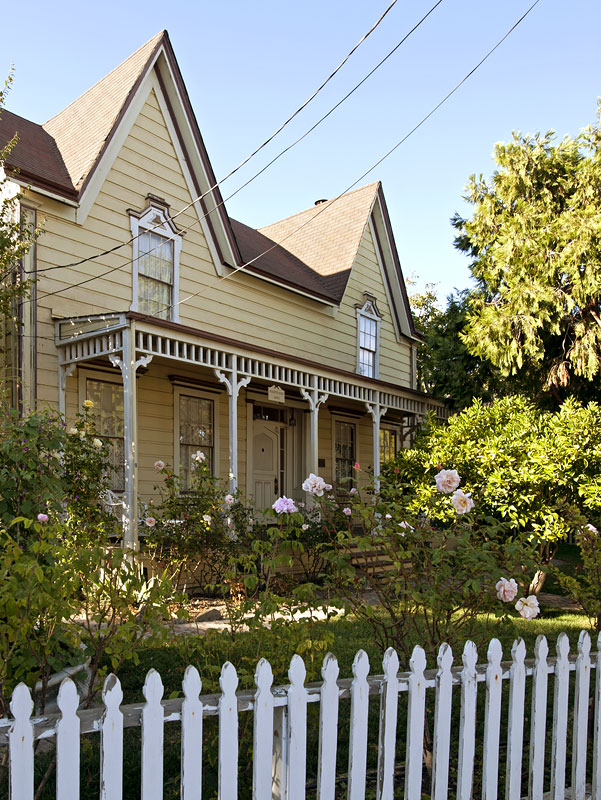

- Location within California
- Location: 45 Monterey Street, San Juan Bautista, California
- Coordinates: 36°50′47″N 121°32′29″W
- Area: 0.23 acres (0.093 ha)
- Built: 1873
- Built by: Thomas W. Bermingham
- Architect: George Chalmers
- Architectural style: Gothic Revival
- NRHP reference No.: 84000951
- Added to NRHP: September 13, 1984

The Marentis House, at 45 Monterey Street in San Juan Bautista, California, was built in 1873. It was listed on the National Register of Historic Places in 1984.

It was designed in Gothic Revival style by George Chalmers, a local builder/architect who was from New England and was believed to have been influenced by Alexander Jackson Davis, an architect who authored/illustrated pattern books. The house was built by Thomas W. Bermingham, another local builder.

It has twin gables facing to the front, from a steeply pitched roof, which was originally shingled with redwood shingles. Two upper front windows have Eastlake window hoods and much of the original glass remains in its windows. The house's floors and ceilings are made of redwood tongue-and-groove boards.

It received limited earthquake retrofitting in the 1990s along with a mahogany gothic library and rebuilt fireplaces and chimney. The original Eastlake front door was replaced with a gothic style Dutch door.

== See also ==
- Benjamin Wilcox House, also designed and/or built by George Chalmers, in San Juan Bautista, and NRHP-listed
- California Historical Landmarks in San Benito County
